= The Eras Tour =

2023–2024 concert tour by Taylor Swift

- Tour by Taylor Swift
- Promotional poster
- Location: Asia; Australia; Europe; North America; South America
- Associated albums: All of Swift's studio albums (Note: All albums supported by the tour: Taylor Swift; Fearless (Taylor's Version); Speak Now (Taylor's Version) (Note: Speak Now (Taylor's Version), 1989 (Taylor's Version) and The Tortured Poets Department were released after the tour began.); Red (Taylor's Version); 1989 (Taylor's Version); Reputation; Lover; Folklore; Evermore; Midnights; The Tortured Poets Department)
- Start date: March 17, 2023
- End date: December 8, 2024
- No. of shows: 149
- Supporting acts: Paramore; Gayle; Beabadoobee; Muna; Gracie Abrams; Phoebe Bridgers; Owenn; Girl in Red; Haim; Sabrina Carpenter; Louta; Mette; Griff; Benson Boone; Sofia Isella; Holly Humberstone; Suki Waterhouse; Maisie Peters; Raye
- Attendance: 10.1 million
- Box office: $2.077 billion
- Website: tstheerastour.taylorswift.com

Taylor Swift concert chronology
- Reputation Stadium Tour (2018); The Eras Tour (2023–2024)

The Eras Tour was the sixth concert tour by the American singer-songwriter Taylor Swift. Considered a landmark of her career, the tour began in Glendale, Arizona, United States, on March 17, 2023, and concluded in Vancouver, British Columbia, Canada, on December 8, 2024. It spanned 149 shows in 51 cities across 21 countries and five continents, generating immense cultural and socioeconomic impact, and became the highest-grossing tour of all time—the first to earn over $1 billion and $2 billion in revenue.

Announced after the release of her tenth studio album Midnights (2022), Swift designed the tour as a retrospective tribute to all of her albums and their corresponding musical "eras". Running over 3.5 hours, the set list consisted of over 40 songs grouped into 10 acts that portrayed each album's mood and aesthetic. The show was revamped in May 2024 to incorporate her eleventh studio album, The Tortured Poets Department (2024). Critics praised the Eras Tour for its concept, production, and immersive ambience, as well as Swift's vocals, stage presence, and versatile showmanship.

The tour recorded unprecedented public demand, ticket sales and attendances, bolstering economies, businesses, and tourism worldwide, dominating social media and news cycles, and garnering tributes from governments and organizations. This also gave rise to multifarious issues: ticketing crashes that inspired a string of anti-scalping laws and price regulation policies; scrutiny of Ticketmaster for monopoly by US authorities; diplomatic tensions in Southeast Asia due to Singapore's exclusivity grant; poor venue management in Rio de Janeiro resulting in a death; a failed ISIS plot to attack the tour in Vienna; and a political scandal in the UK.

Swift disclosed and released various works throughout the tour: the re-recorded albums Speak Now (Taylor's Version) and 1989 (Taylor's Version) in 2023; editions of Midnights and The Tortured Poets Department; the music videos of "Karma", "I Can See You", and "I Can Do It with a Broken Heart"; and "Cruel Summer" as a single. An accompanying concert film, documenting the Los Angeles shows, was released to theaters worldwide on October 13, 2023, in an uncommon distribution deal circumventing major film studios. Met with critical acclaim, the film became the highest-grossing concert film in history. A photo book of the tour, The Eras Tour Book, was released on November 29, 2024. A behind-the-scenes series, The End of an Era, and a second concert film based on the Vancouver shows, The Final Show, were released on December 12, 2025, on Disney+. The tour's accolades include an iHeartRadio Music Award for Tour of the Century and six Guinness World Records. Swift's life as an entertainer during the tour inspired her twelfth studio album, The Life of a Showgirl (2025).

== Background ==
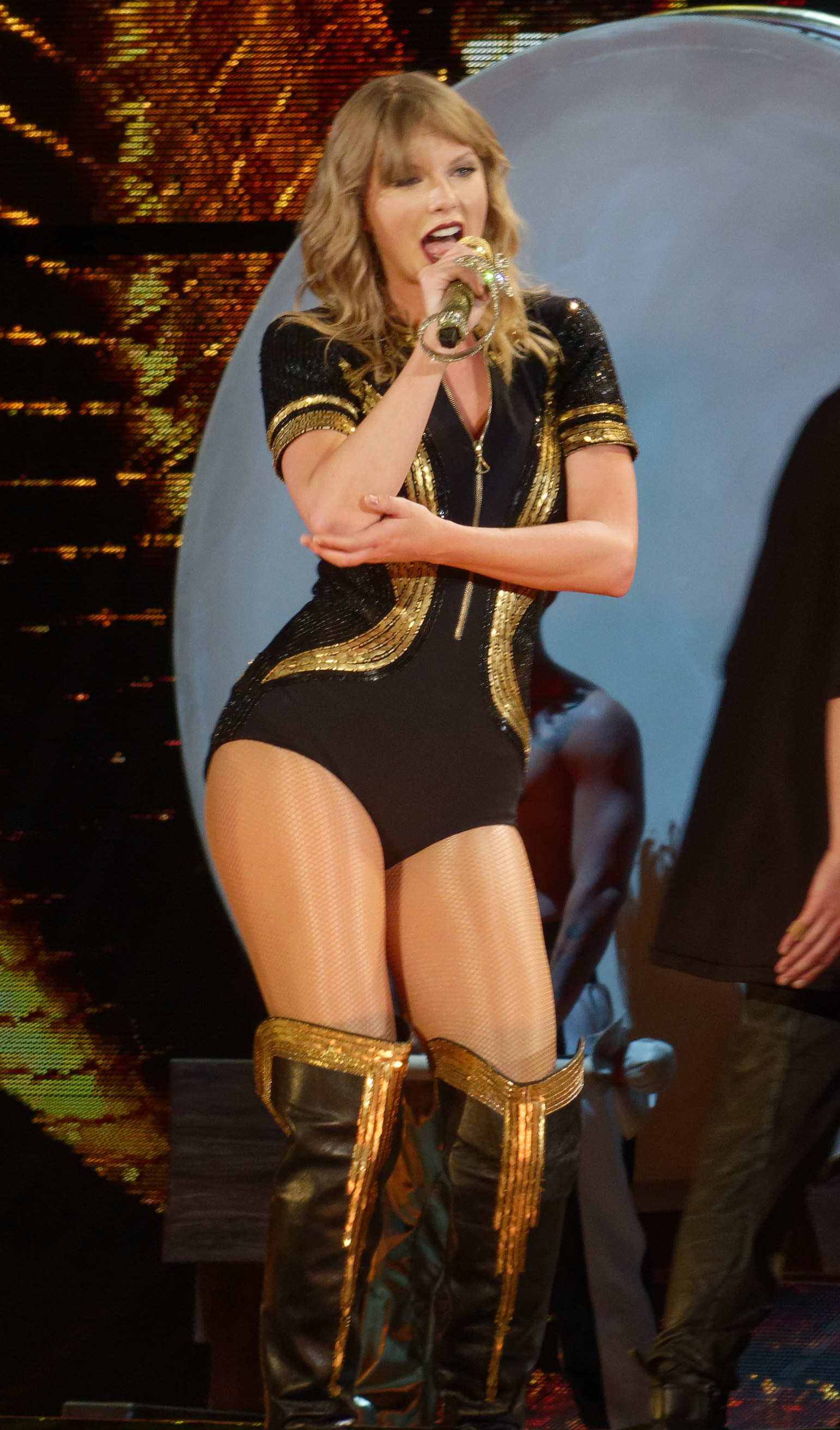
Taylor Swift on the Reputation Stadium Tour (2018), the highest-grossing North American concert tour before the Eras Tour

Taylor Swift's last concert tour, the Reputation Stadium Tour (2018), broke the record for the highest-grossing US tour in history. She cancelled a planned concert tour in support of her seventh studio album Lover (2019), due to the outbreak of the COVID-19 pandemic in 2020, and subsequently released three new studio albums: Folklore (2020), Evermore (2020), and Midnights (2022). As part of her re-recording project to claim ownership over the masters of her past albums, she released two re-recorded albums, Fearless (Taylor's Version) and Red (Taylor's Version), in 2021.

During promotion for Midnights, on November 1, 2022, she announced the Eras Tour, which she described as "a journey through the musical eras of [her] career", on Good Morning America and through her social media accounts. Messina Touring Group, an Anschutz Entertainment Group (AEG) partner, was the tour's promoter. She first announced 27 US shows from March to August 2023, beginning in Glendale, Arizona, and ending in Inglewood, California. The opening acts were Paramore, Haim, Phoebe Bridgers, Beabadoobee, Girl in Red, Muna, Gayle, Gracie Abrams, and Owenn, each two of whom shared a tour date. Popular demand led Swift to announce eight additional US shows on November 4, and 17 the following week. A second US leg was announced on August 4, 2023, with Abrams as the opener. Billboard thought that the huge demand contributed to "the most chaos-inducing tour announcement of the decade".

On June 2, 2023, Swift announced the Latin American shows of the Eras Tour, with Sabrina Carpenter as the opening act. A third show in Buenos Aires was announced on June 6, two hours after the public sale commenced, due to high demand. Louta was announced as an additional opening act. Additional shows in Mexico City, Rio de Janeiro, and São Paulo were announced on June 12. Shows in Asia, Australia, and Europe were announced on June 20. From June to November 2023, new shows were added to the tour. In Asia-Pacific, six extra shows were added to Singapore, and two to Australia. In Europe, eight shows were added initially, followed by fourteen more, then two in London; Paramore was announced as the leg's opening act. Nine shows were also announced in Canada (Toronto and Vancouver), with Abrams as the opening act. In February 2024, a second show was added in Madrid after the venue's football club, Real Madrid, asked La Liga to reschedule their match to cover the "extraordinary demand".

Several politicians and government officials demanded the tour be brought to their country or city. Places such as Canada and Chile were expected to be part of the tour but were absent in Swift's announcement on June 20, drawing dismay and demands from fans and officials. Across Southeast Asia, fans decried the lack of shows in countries like the Philippines, Malaysia, Indonesia, Thailand and Hong Kong and demanded the tour be brought to there. In particular, her return to the Philippines had been highly anticipated. Some journalists and fans opined that unlike venues in Japan and Singapore—the only Asian countries that are a part of the Eras Tour—those in Hong Kong, the Philippines, Indonesia, and Thailand might not have the proper infrastructure that is required to host the tour. In addition, Hong Kong and mainland China reopened to foreigners much later than most other places following the COVID-19 pandemic lockdowns, which may have affected touring plans, as per South China Morning Post. In Malaysia, legal opposition to LGBT rights, Singapore exclusive agreement, and the ban on pop concerts during Ramadan were cited as potential reasons.

== Ticket sales ==
Ticket sales for the Eras Tour were handled by various ticketing agencies around the world, such as Ticketmaster, over several dates. Met with unprecedented, record-setting demand, tickets at every venue sold out in hours. Sales faced technical malfunctions in many countries; bulk purchases of tickets by scalpers and bots were reported at numerous venues, resulting in tickets being listed on resale platforms for exorbitant prices. StubHub noted that the Eras Tour ticket sales were "tracking to be the best-selling of any artist [they've] seen". Jay Marciano, CEO of AEG, stated that Swift outright refused to impose dynamic pricing on the tickets in the purview of her fans.

=== US and Canada ===
The first US leg was set to go on sale to the general public on November 18, 2022. Due to Swift's multi-year partnership with Capital One, their cardholders had presale access, which was set to begin on November 15. Fans registered for the Ticketmaster Verified Fan program from November 1 through 9 to receive a presale code that granted exclusive access to the TaylorSwiftTix Presale on November 15; those who purchased merchandise from Swift's website received "boosts", and previous Lover Fest ticket holders also received preferred access to the presale if they registered using the same Ticketmaster account. Swift confirmed ticket prices in advance, abandoning the "platinum ticket" model; they ranged from US$49 to $449, while VIP packages ranged from $199 to $899. According to Ticketmaster, the TaylorSwiftTix Presale provided "the best opportunity to get more tickets into the hands of fans who want to attend the show" by evading bots and scalpers. It also noted that if demand from the program "exceeds supply", it is possible that "verified fans may be selected at random to participate in the presale." It later reported that it received a record 3.5 million verified fan registrations for the Eras Tour. Ahead of the second leg's presale on August 11, Ticketmaster estimated that 14 million users were vying for roughly 625,000 tickets.

Ticketmaster handled the Canadian sales as well, using the Verified Fan program. Members of the Royal Bank of Canada's Avion Rewards program received exclusive access to a separate presale. An estimated 31 million people registered for the Toronto Verified Fan presale, equal to over 77 percent of Canada's population.

=== Latin America ===
Latin American tickets went on sale in early June 2023. Presale access was granted to Banco Patagonia clients in Argentina on June 5; around one million customers were reported to have queued for the 24,000 available presale tickets for the Buenos Aires shows, and over three million during the general sale. DF Entertainment served as Swift's tour promotion partner in Argentina; CEO Diego Finkelstein called the demand "unprecedented", based on which Perfil opined that Swift could fill the stadium 36 times if she wanted to. On the day of the show, more than 1 million users tried to get last-minute seats.

In Mexico, ticket presale was handled by Ticketmaster's Verified Fan program; registrations ran from June 2 through June 7, followed by a general public on-sale. In Brazil, previous Lover Fest ticket holders and C6 Bank Mastercard holders gained access to presales on June 6 and 10, respectively. Instantly after the announcement of the shows on June 2, people camped outside Allianz Parque to purchase physical tickets to the São Paulo shows that would not go on sale to the general public until June 12. The Mastercard presale tickets sold out in 30 minutes, with over one million customers queueing. On June 12, over two million users queued for the general sale online.

=== Asia-Pacific ===
Tickets in Japan were sold by Lawson under their Loppi ticket system. Unlike other countries, all Japanese tickets were only sold as lottery tickets. The pre-sale for American Express card holders began from June 23 to 26, 2023, and pre-sale for Lawson began from June 27 to July 10. Due to the high demand, Lawson announced the second lottery pre-sale, which began from July 28 to August 3. The additional general sale took place on August 22, 2023, and immediately sold out.

In Australia, tickets were only available via Ticketek. Guardian Australia reported that the Australian leg was met with unprecedented demand as well. Within 12 hours, over one million people signed up for presale codes. American Express cardholders purchased VIP packages from June 26 to 28; the website crashed within half an hour, and all packages sold out on June 26. Following the scalping highlighted by Australian consumer organization Choice, the Victoria State Government declared the Eras Tour in Melbourne a "major event", a legal provision penalizing scalping and misleading advertisement in Victoria. Because reselling a ticket for more than 10% above the original price had already been illegal in New South Wales, the government investigated the ticket resale platform Viagogo after the scalping reports. On June 28, those registered with Frontier Touring Company gained access to a presale for which over four million users queued, setting a national record; tickets sold out within three hours. Ticketek stated it neutralized over 500 million bot purchase attempts during the presale. The public on-sale began on June 30, with tickets selling out that day. A second sale on November 10 sold out within two hours for Sydney and under one hour for Melbourne. A third sale for a limited number of tickets, including restricted view seats, occurred on February 13, 2024.

For the Singaporean shows, United Overseas Bank (UOB) cardholders in Singapore, Malaysia, Thailand, Indonesia and Vietnam had presale access on July 5, 2023, with over one million users in the virtual queue. The Straits Times reported that Swift's fans in Singapore and other eligible Southeast Asian countries began "scrambling" to sign up for UOB cards. Around 22 million users registered for access to the 330,000 available tickets during the July 7 general sale, which happened both virtually and via Singapore Post offices; tickets sold out immediately despite website crashes. Klook, an official experience partner for the Singapore leg, sold travel packages along with tickets, which were purchased by dozens of Filipino fans and instantly sold out. Marina Bay Sands sold tickets coupled with hotel stays and other experiences.

=== Europe ===
The Lisbon shows went on sale on July 12 and 27, 2023, via See Tickets, with transferrable access codes mailed to registered users, who were limited to four tickets per code. Standard tickets for both shows sold out within 2.5 hours. Following popular demand for an additional show in Madrid, Spain, La Liga approved football club Real Madrid's request to move their match from May 26 to 25, 2024, to make way for a second Eras Tour show at the Santiago Bernabéu Stadium on May 29.

Swift performs "Cruel Summer" in Warsaw, Poland

Three million people queued for tickets in Germany, and 600,000 registered for the Warsaw shows. All 170,000 tickets for the three Vienna shows sold out within a few hours, marking the largest and fastest ticket sale ever in Austria. All 95,000 Zurich tickets sold out within 30 minutes. In Italy, two million people tried to access tickets for the two shows in Milan, per Italian organizers D'Alessandro & Galli.

In France, TF1 reported the highest demand ever for a presale. Angelo Gopee, head of Live Nation France, stated, "the demand is such that many have found themselves in a virtual queue just to subscribe to the mailing list which, potentially, will open access to the ticket office. From memory, we had never seen that in France". The Paris presale opened on July 11, 2023, to over one million queued users. Ticketmaster suspended both Paris and Lyon presales within an hour after reports of login glitches; they were rescheduled to July 17 to 21. Over 250,000 tickets were sold for the six French dates, with AEG France executive Arnaud Meersseman estimating Swift could have done twelve shows due to the overwhelming demand. According to RMC, the capacity for the four shows at Paris La Défense Arena was also increased from 41,500 to 45,000, meaning Swift will perform for 180,000 attendees in Paris alone.

Ticketmaster and AXS handled the United Kingdom sale. Those who had previously pre-ordered Midnights were able to access presales from July 10 to 12. London's Wembley Stadium officials described the demand for tickets as "unprecedented" and noted that waiting times were "longer than usual". Cardiff's Principality Stadium tickets were pre-sold on July 14. In addition to website malfunctions, Forbes reported widespread scalping of the tour's UK tickets, with immediate re-listing on sites like StubHub and Viagogo for extortionate prices. Viagogo responded that the demand of the tour's European leg is something the company had not seen "since the Beatles". The UK general sale took place from July 17 to 19. In Scotland, the City of Edinburgh Council granted organizers permission to increase Murrayfield Stadium's capacity from 67,130 to 72,990 for Swift's three shows. In Ireland, around 500,000 people registered for the Dublin shows. On account of the website crashes during the UK sale, Ticketmaster announced staggered on-sale times for Dublin on July 20, 2023; tickets sold out in minutes. The Irish Times highlighted that, unlike the UK, "the practice of reselling tickets above face value has been illegal in Ireland since 2021", so no scalping was reported.

== Production ==
The Eras Tour was produced by Swift's in-house tour production company, Taylor Swift Touring. The company hired around 90 trucks to haul staging, costumes and other equipment for the shows. Canadian production designer Ethan Tobman served as the tour's creative director. The Wall Street Journal stated the tour was one of the most expensive and "technically ambitious" productions of the 21st century. Interior design magazine Architectural Digest named the tour Swift's "most ambitious" set design and praised its worldbuilding.

=== Stage and lighting ===
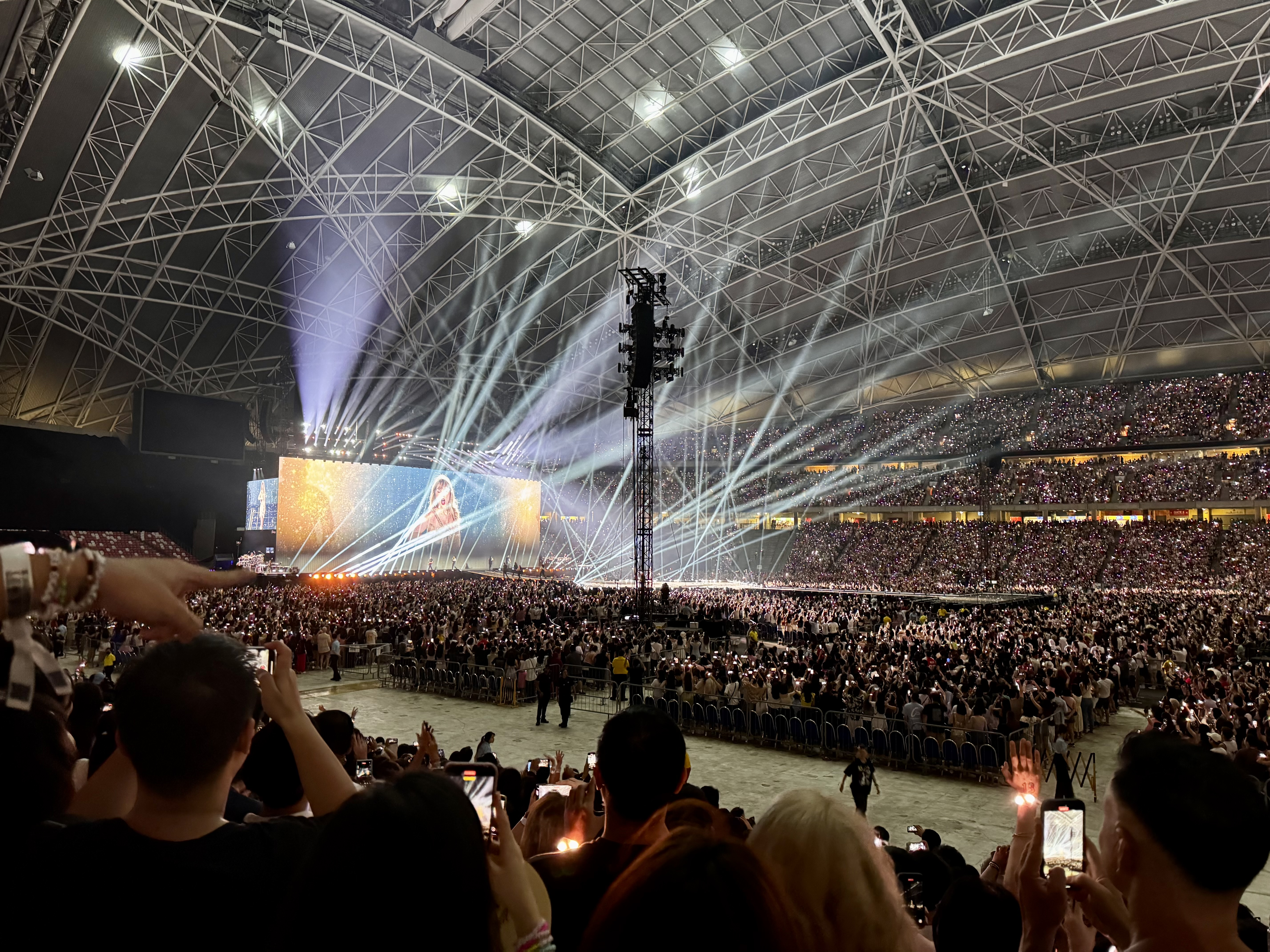
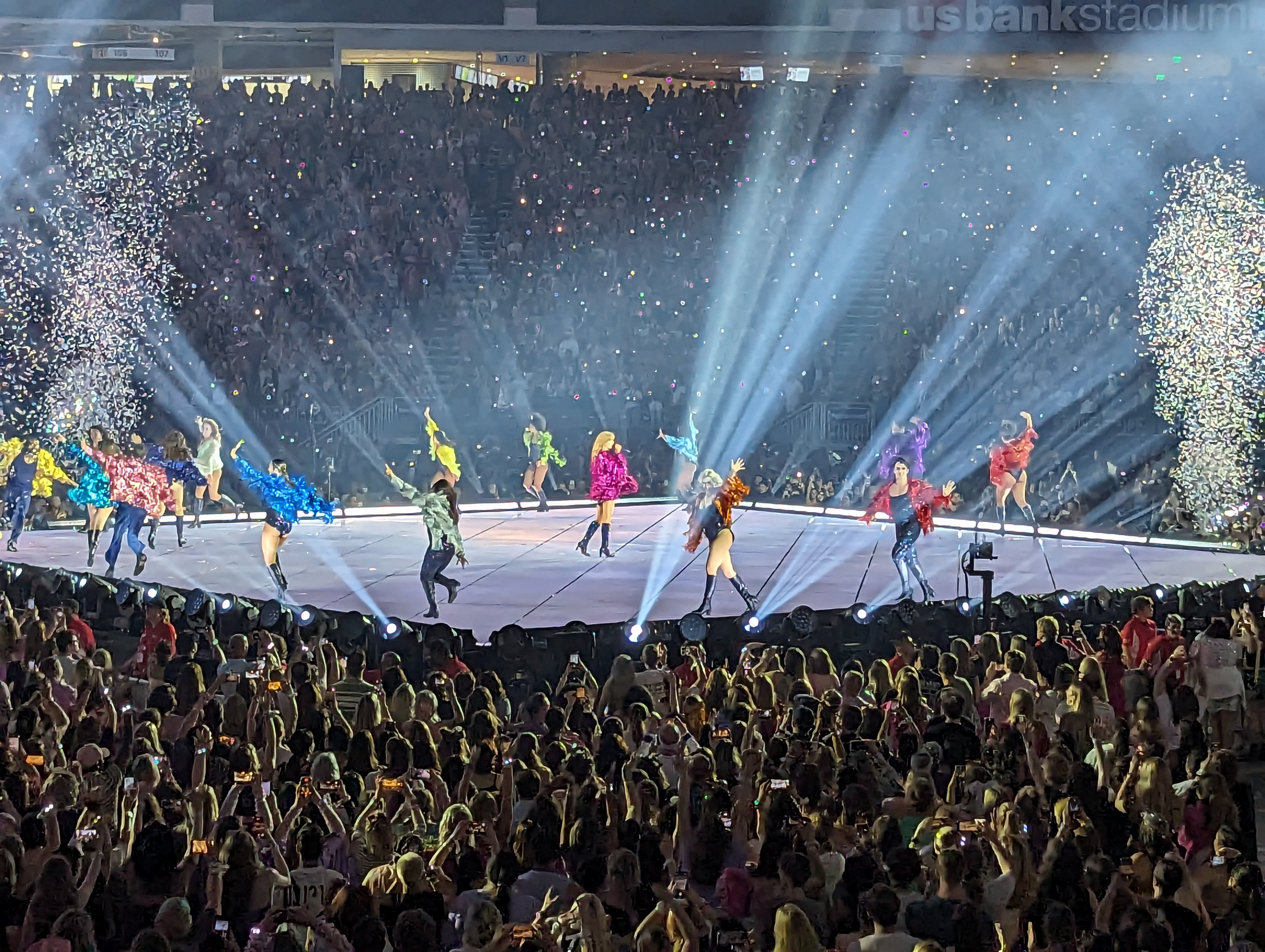
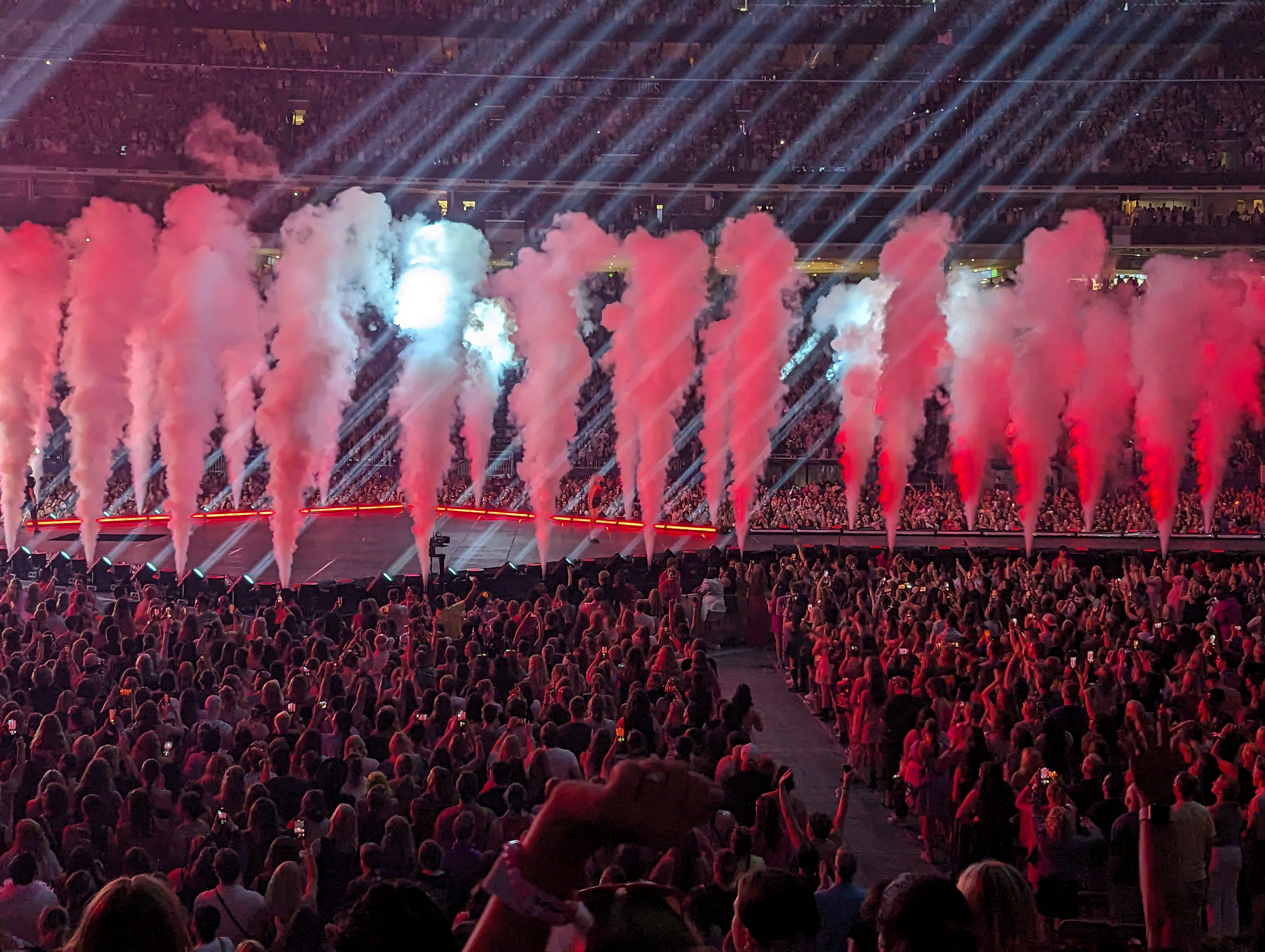
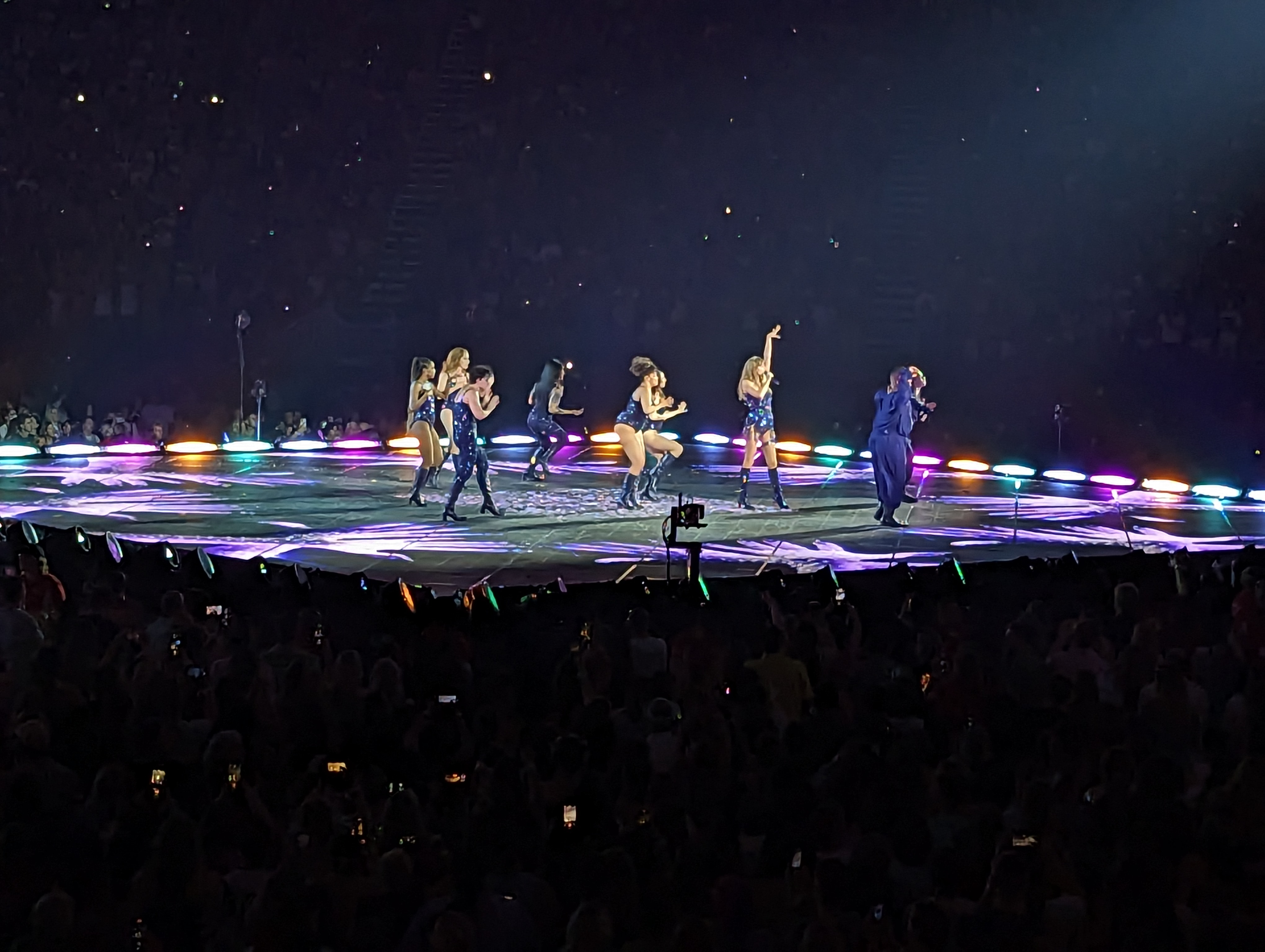
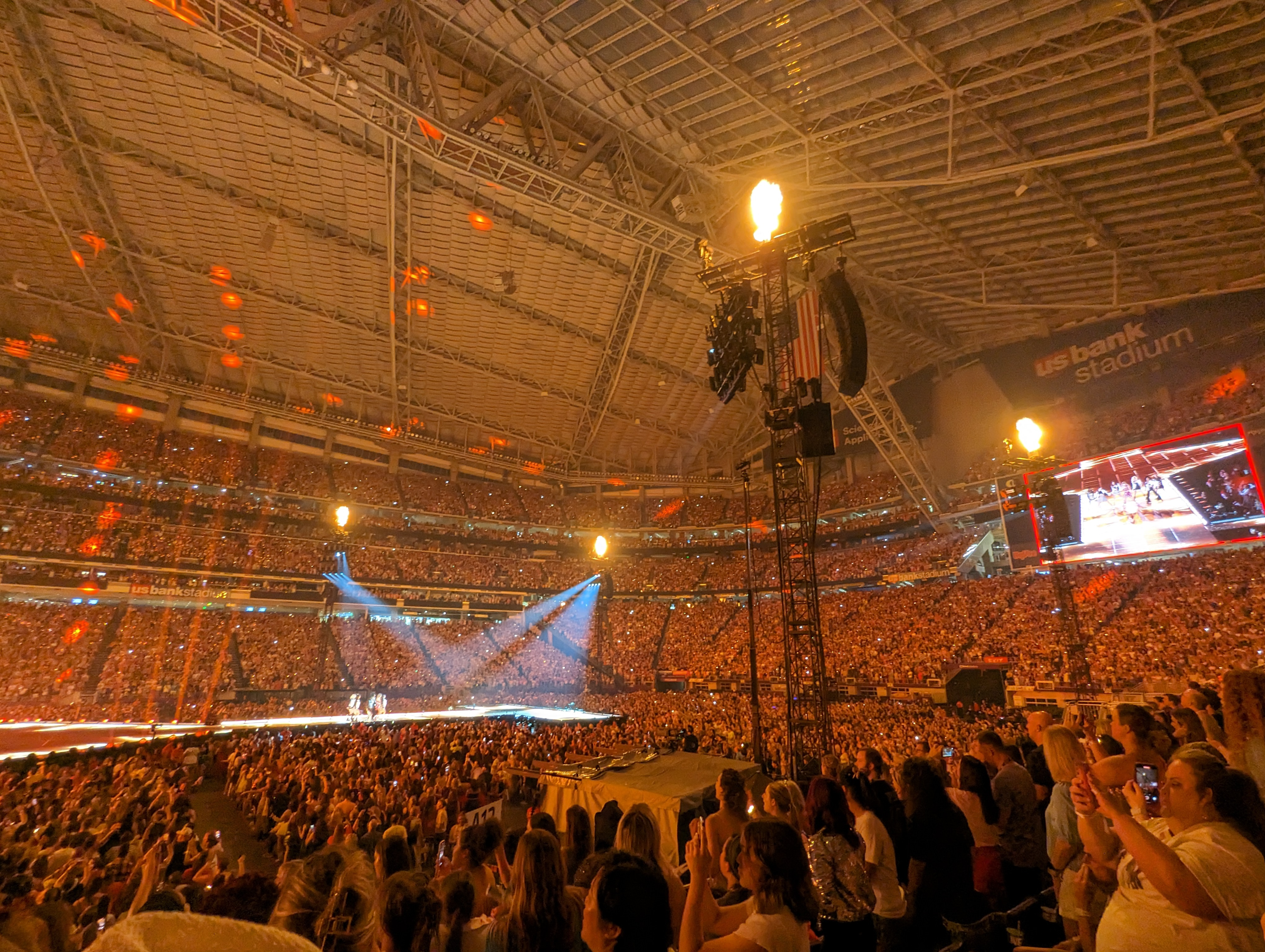
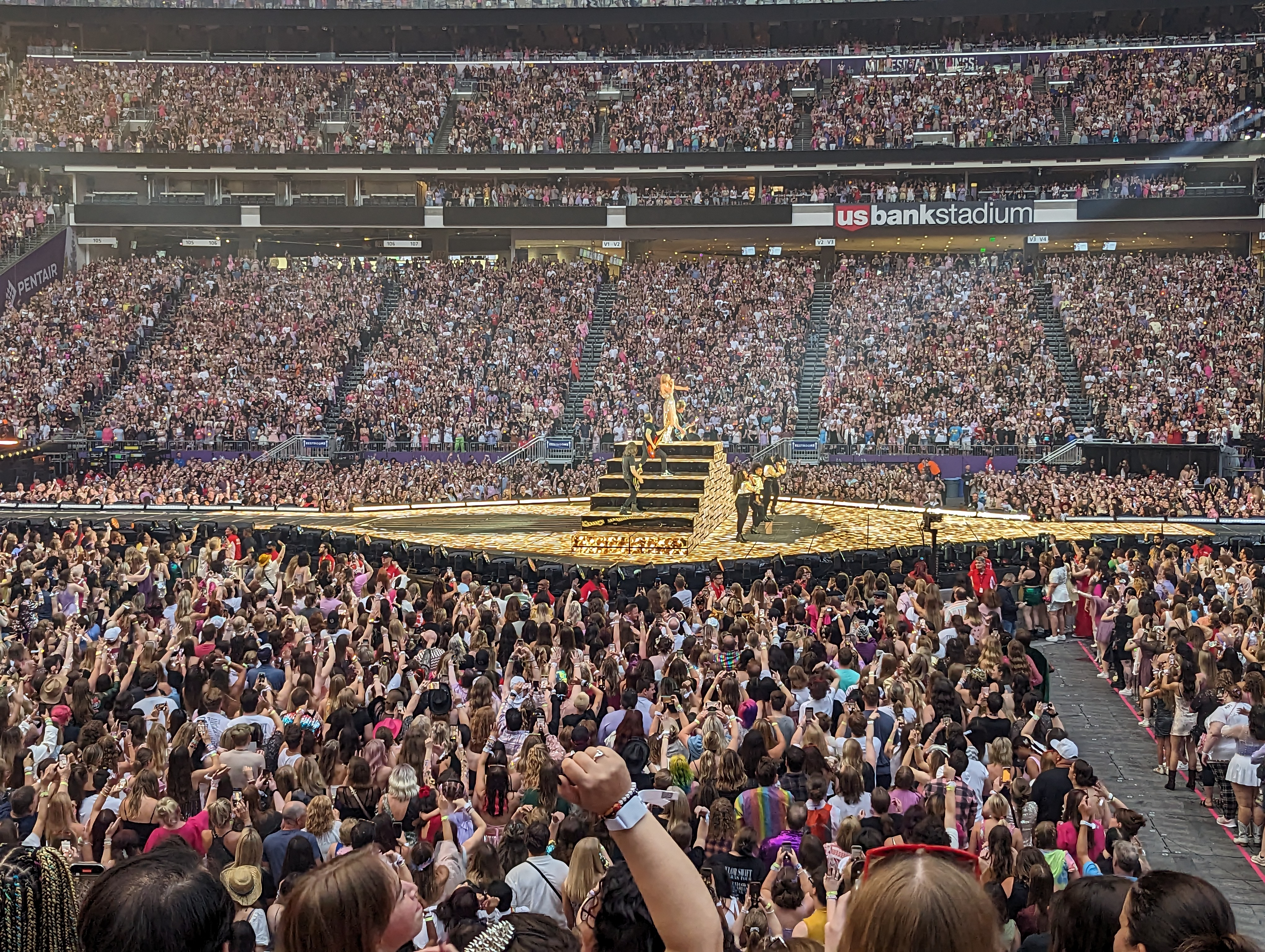
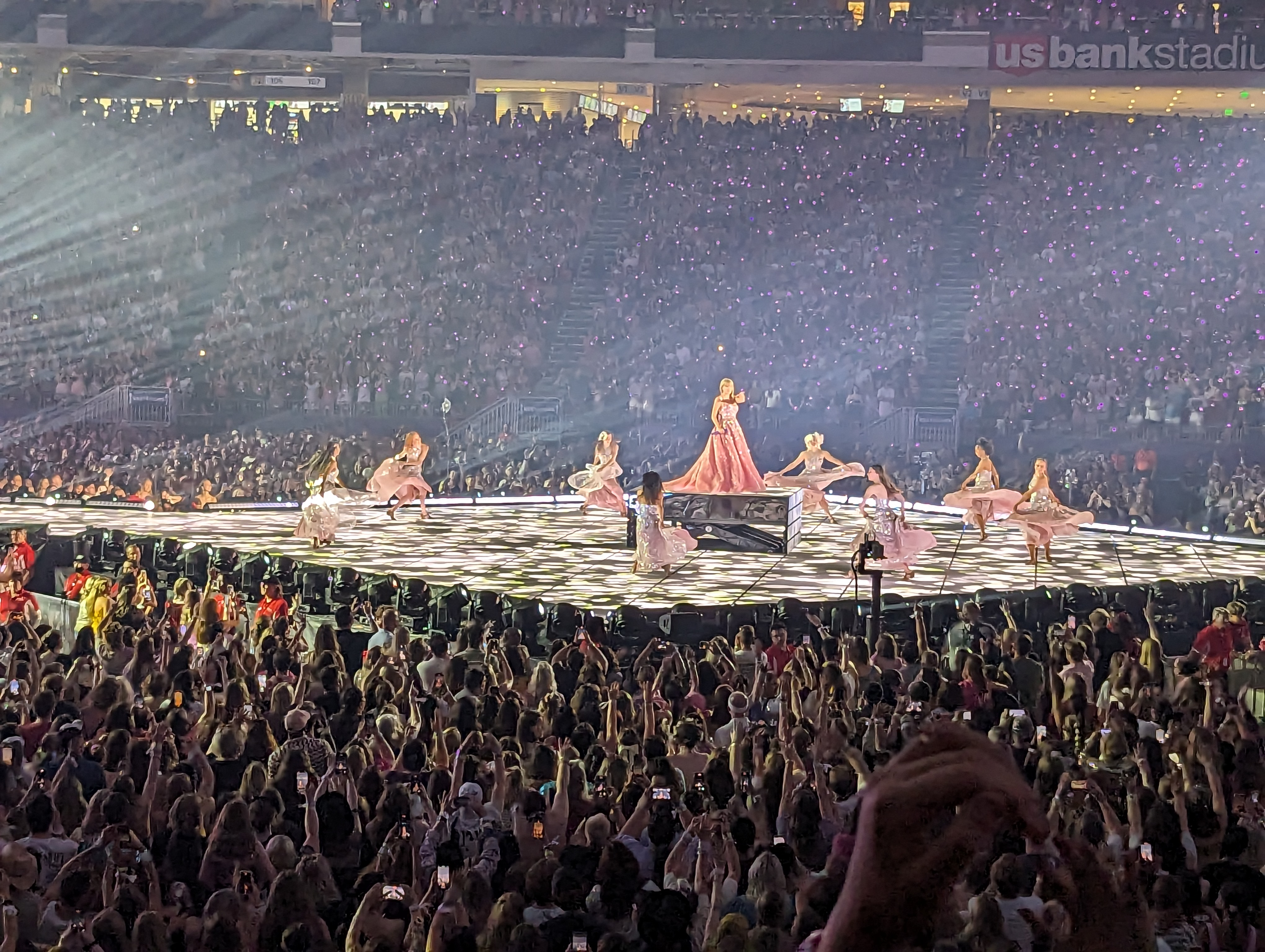
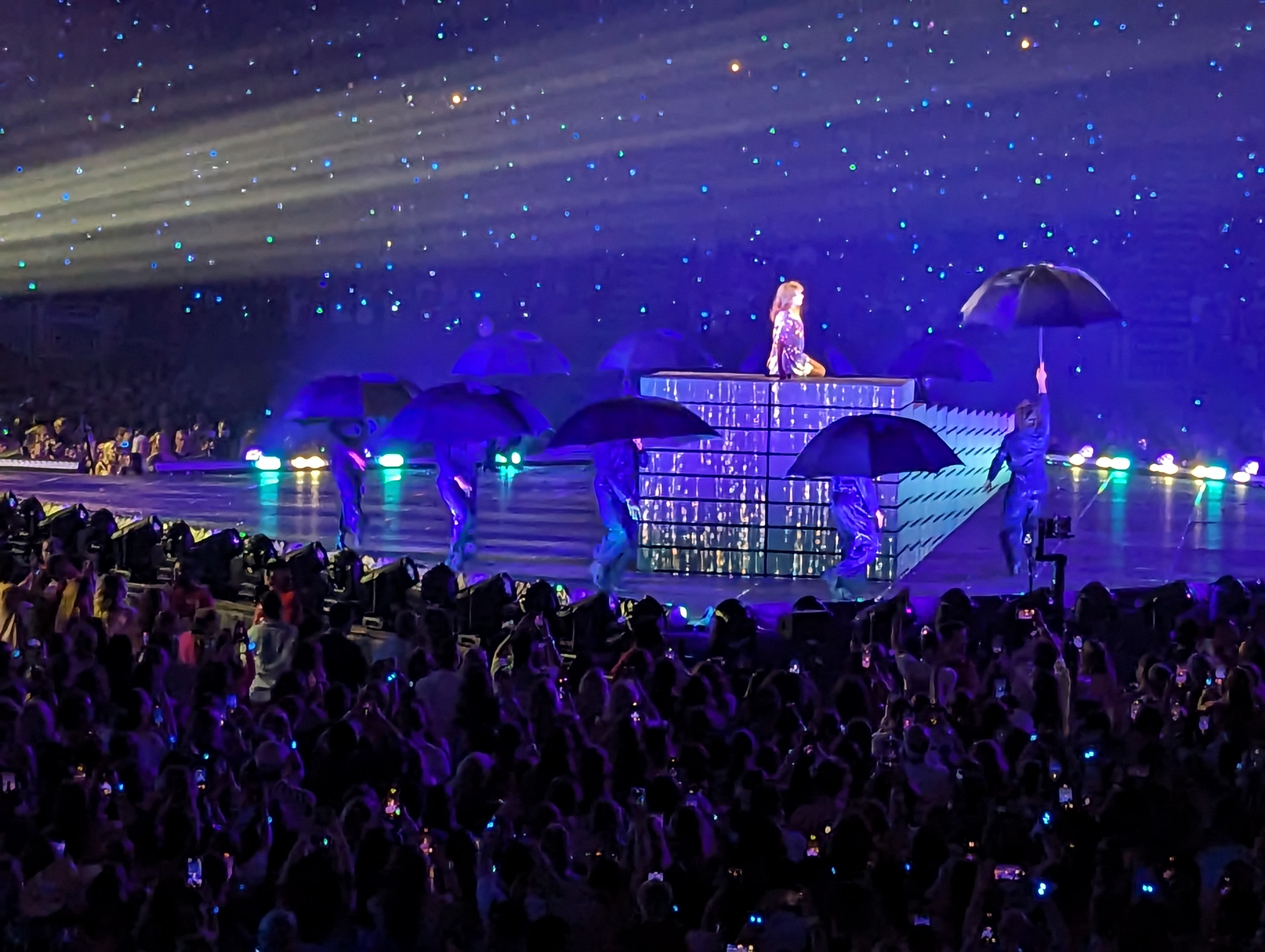
The production consists of light beams, smoke machines, confetti shooters, coordinated serial lights, pyrotechnics, and hydraulic platforms. The middle stage has mobile blocks that form different shapes of elevated platform throughout the show.

The Eras Tour staging was expansive, made of digital displays. It consisted of three separate stages connected by a broad ramp: a main stage with a giant, curved widescreen, a rhombic middle stage, and a rectangular stage that along with the ramp forms a T-shape at the middle of the floor. The stages featured various visuals and effects throughout the show. The tour's concept centered on worldbuilding, featuring a diverse set of props and performing styles to convey the varying moods and aesthetics of Swift's albums.

The staging was equipped with an in-built "hyperactive" hydraulic platform, with the main and middle stages having mobile blocks that manually rose from the center to form platforms of different shapes, and another car-like platform that was moved on the middle stage, driven by an operator seated within the platform but concealed from the audience. The tour's "massive" production is heavily inspired by Broadway theatre. It was described as a 4D cognitive experience, featuring pyrotechnics, laser lights, smoke machines, fire cannons, indoor fireworks, PixMob LED bracelets, and image projection technology, such as projection mapping.

=== Music and performance ===
Designed as a tribute to Swift's discography across her career since 2006, the Eras Tour covered all of the styles of music seen in her 11 studio albums, including The Tortured Poets Department, which was added in the European leg of the tour after the album's release. The styles ranged from country and pop to folk and alternative rock genres. Some media outlets dubbed the Eras Tour the "greatest hits" tour of an artist still in her commercial prime. The set list placed a somewhat greater focus on albums Swift had not previously toured, including first-ever live performances of several tracks. According to the music journalist Alexis Petridis, the Eras Tour was a musically eclectic production, consisting of "dubstep-inspired, dark-hued pop; tweedy folk; monster-chorus-sporting anthems and acoustic guitar-driven songs that show her Nashville grounding".

The concert ensemble included 15 backup dancers, choreographed by Mandy Moore, and Swift's live band of six instrumentalists who have been touring with her since 2007 and four female backing vocalists. Moore was recommended by Swift's friend, American actress Emma Stone, who had worked with Moore on the musical film La La Land (2016). To prepare for the tour physically, Swift trained using a custom workout routine designed by personal trainer Kirk Myers; Swift sang the entire set list daily while running on a treadmill, trained in dance for three months leading up to the first show, and forwent the consumption of alcohol.

=== Fashion ===
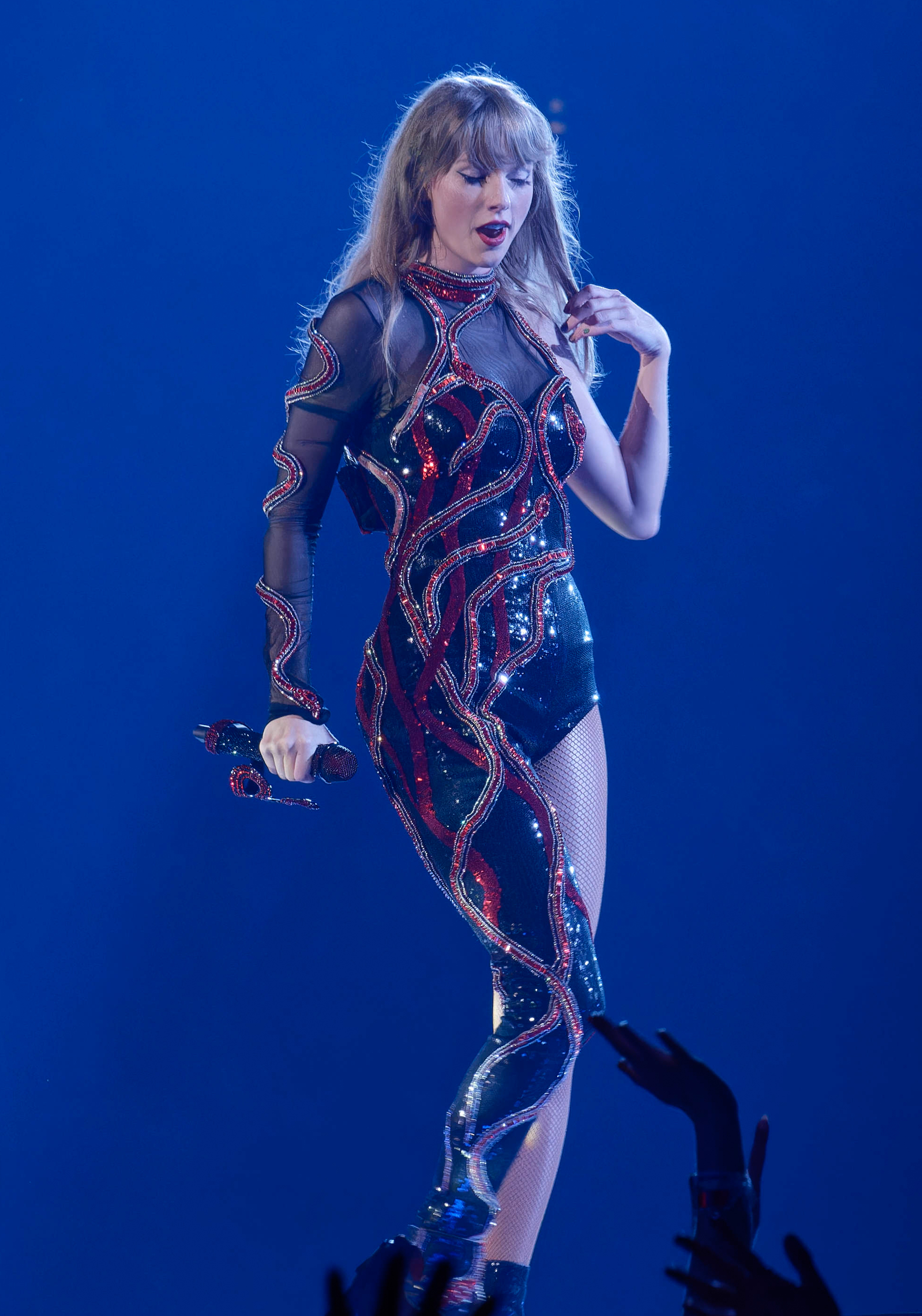
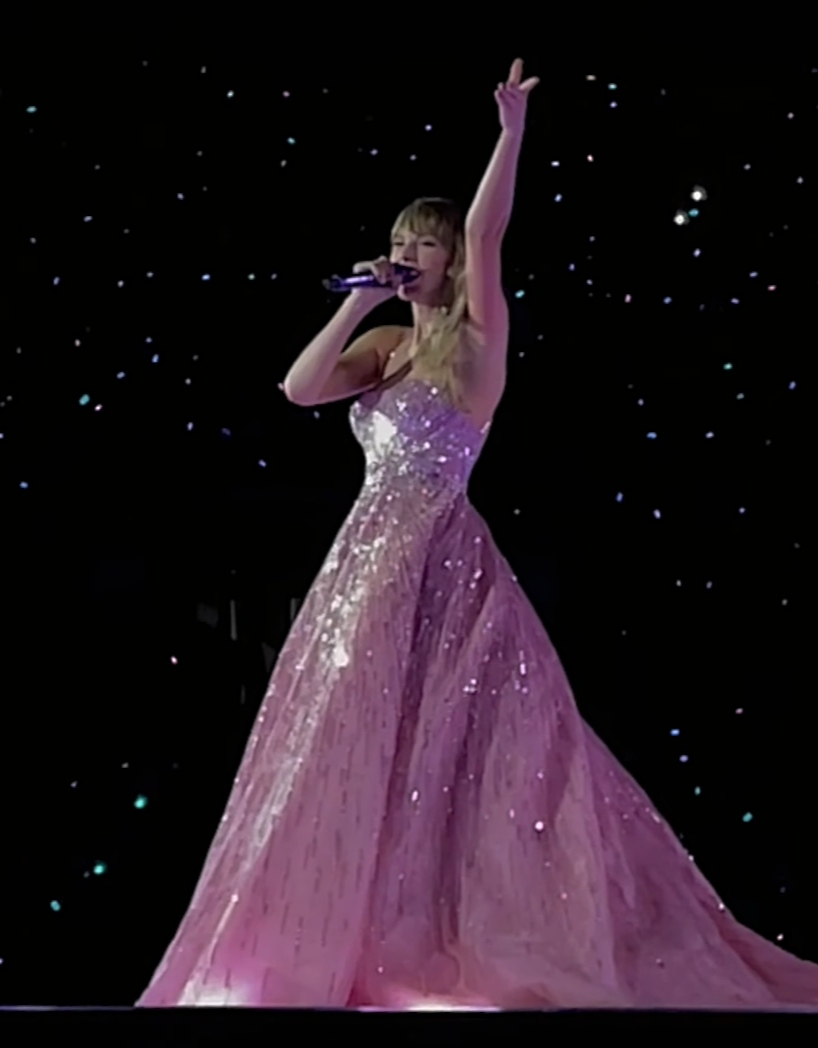
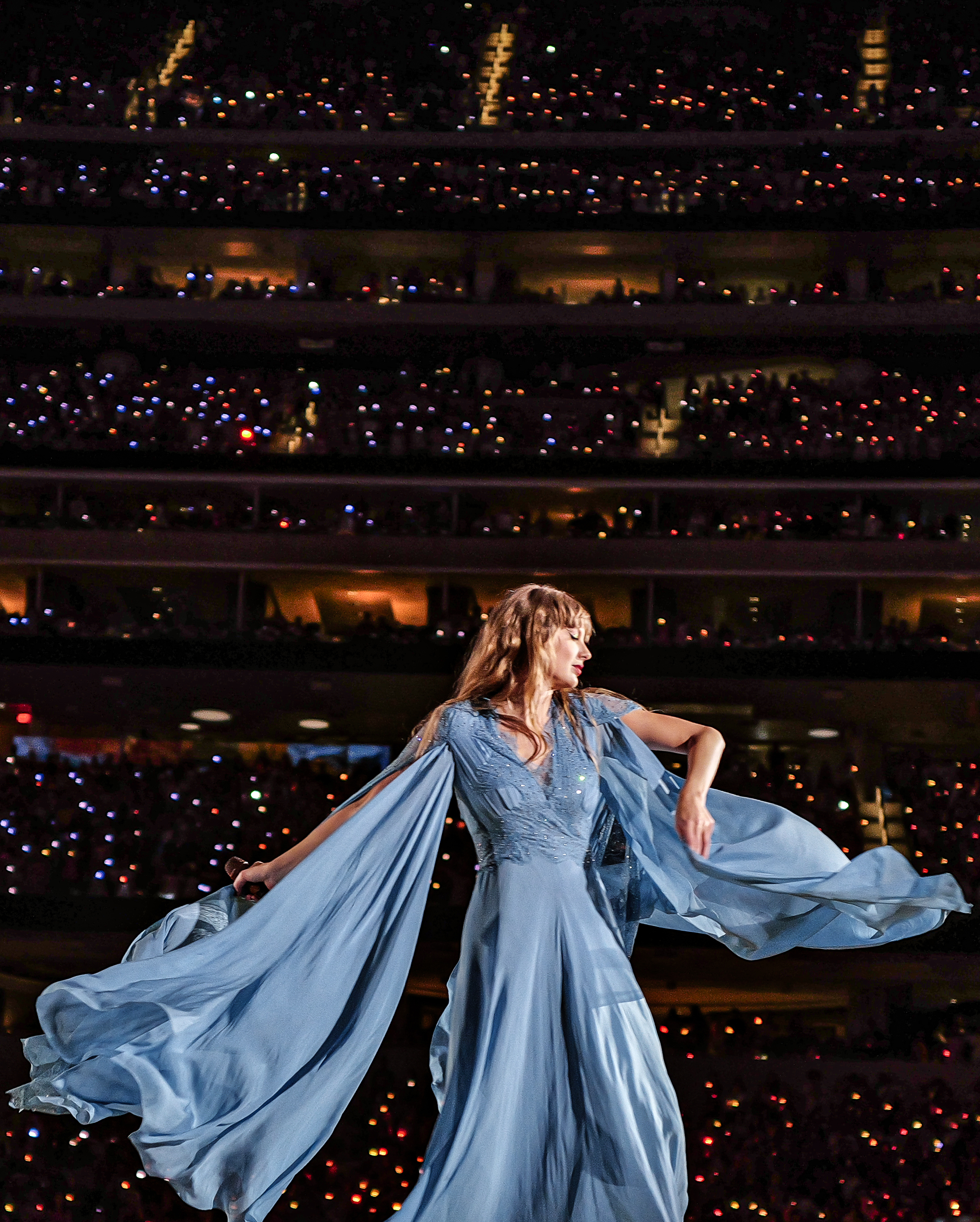
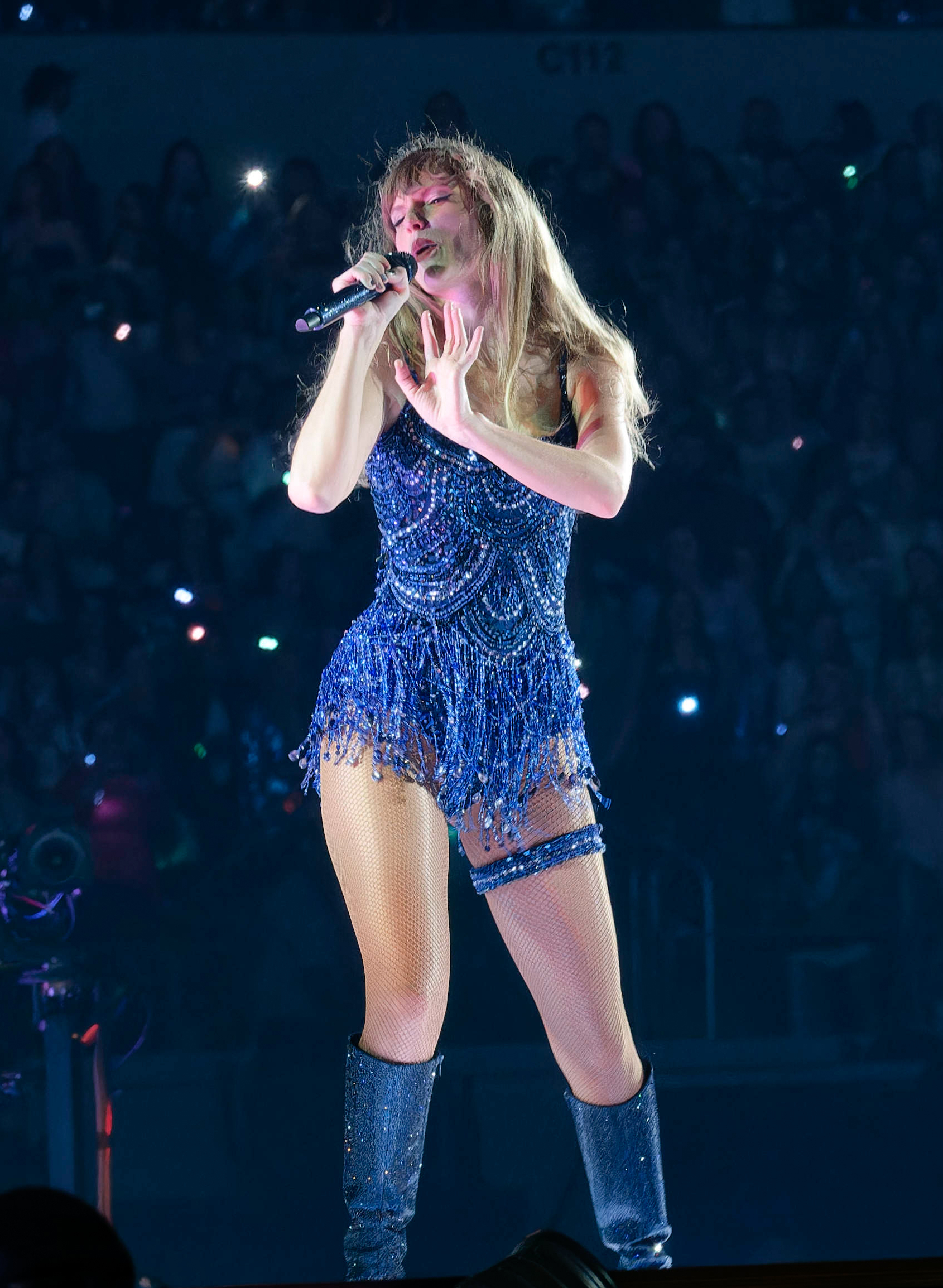
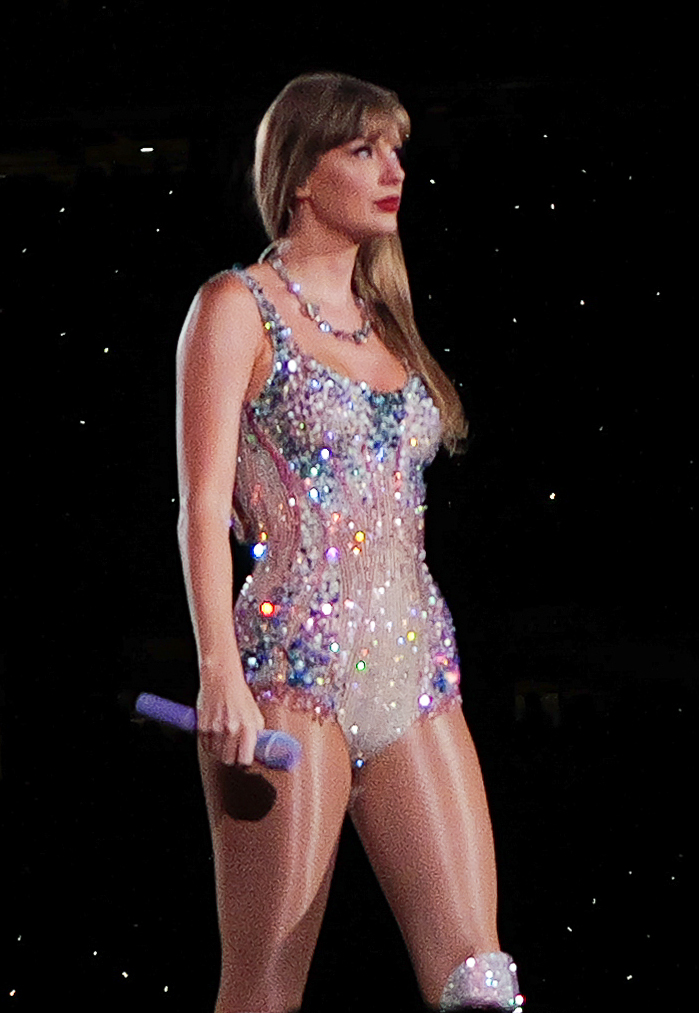
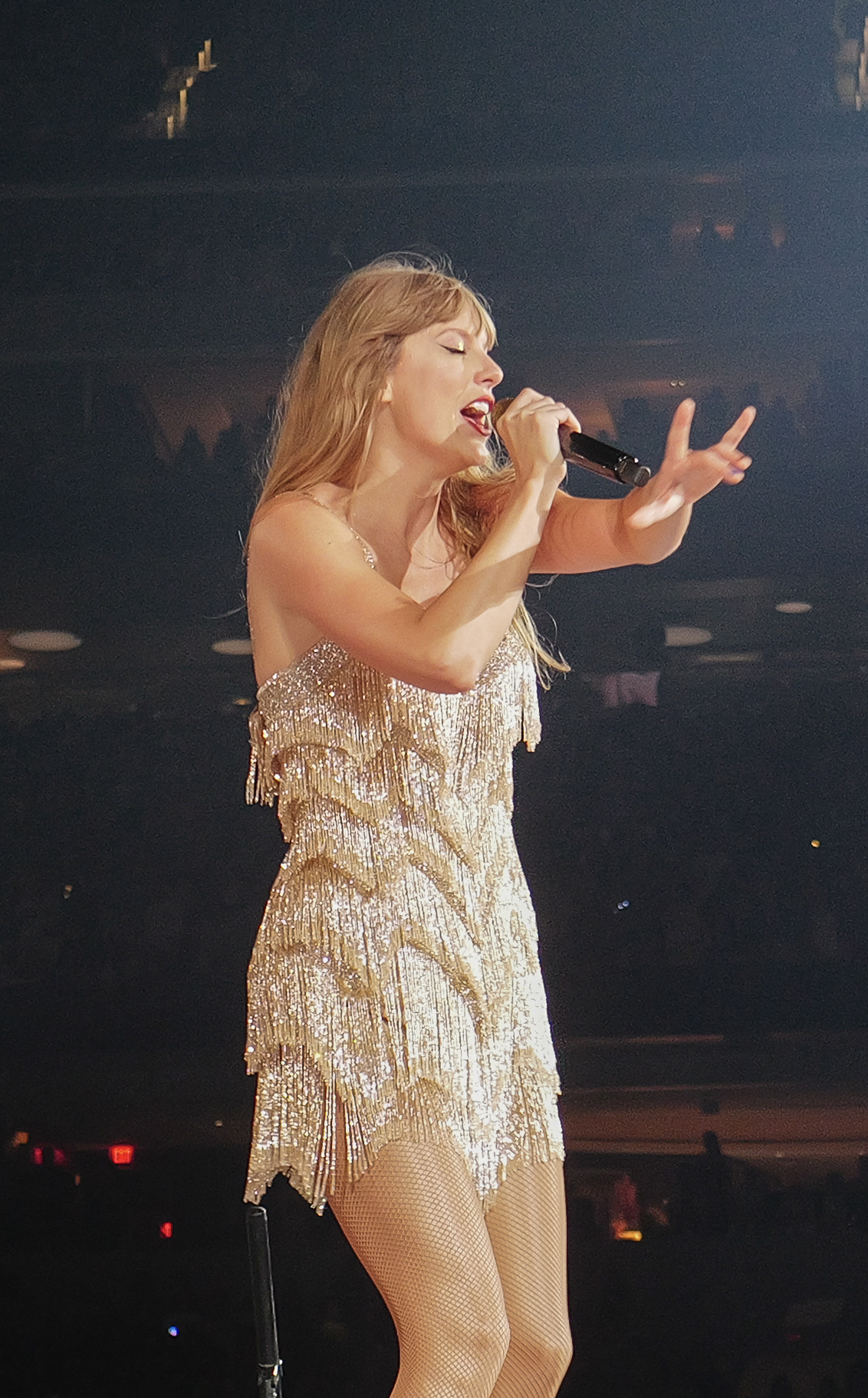
Designers such as Roberto Cavalli, Zuhair Murad and Oscar de la Renta custom-made Swift's outfits for the tour to complement each album's aesthetic.

Swift's wardrobe at the Eras Tour was a subject of widespread media coverage. Her costumes and those of her accompanying dancers, as well as her microphones and guitars, paid homage to her 10 albums. They were inspired by previous performances, music videos, and public appearances, intended to align with the overarching themes and palette of the era Swift referenced in an act, showcasing the various sonic and visual aesthetics she had adopted in her career. However, crystals were a unifying fashion choice; costumes of every act were adorned with them.

Attire and accessories were mostly custom-made by fashion houses Swift had worked with before, such as Atelier Versace, Roberto Cavalli, Etro, Nicole + Felicia Couture, Zuhair Murad, Elie Saab, Ashish, Alberta Ferretti, Jessica Jones, and Oscar de la Renta. Swift wore variations of some costumes at different shows, usually paired with Christian Louboutin shoes. Swift's black fedora from "22" was designed by Gladys Tamez. Fausto Puglisi, a designer for Roberto Cavalli, stated that he took an "artisanal approach to craftsmanship" while customizing the outfits, claiming "everything must be eye-catching" when designing for concerts. He incorporated Swarovski crystals in the costumes Swift wore during the Fearless, 1989, and Reputation acts, which required over 170 hours of meticulous "hand-craftsmanship by skilled artisans" to make. The sequined tulle ball gown that Murad designed for the Speak Now act required "over 350 hours of atelier handwork". Ferretti used chiffon and micro-beading for the Folklore era dresses, while the Midnights Oscar de la Renta fringed bodysuit was hand-adorned with more than 5,300 beads and crystals.

StyleCaster regarded the Eras Tour wardrobe as Swift's best fashion collection for a tour. The New York Times' chief fashion critic Vanessa Friedman considered the Eras Tour a fashion show beyond merely live music and praised Swift's "fabulous" but purposeful wardrobe choices for setting the bar high for future concerts by other artists.

== Concert synopsis ==
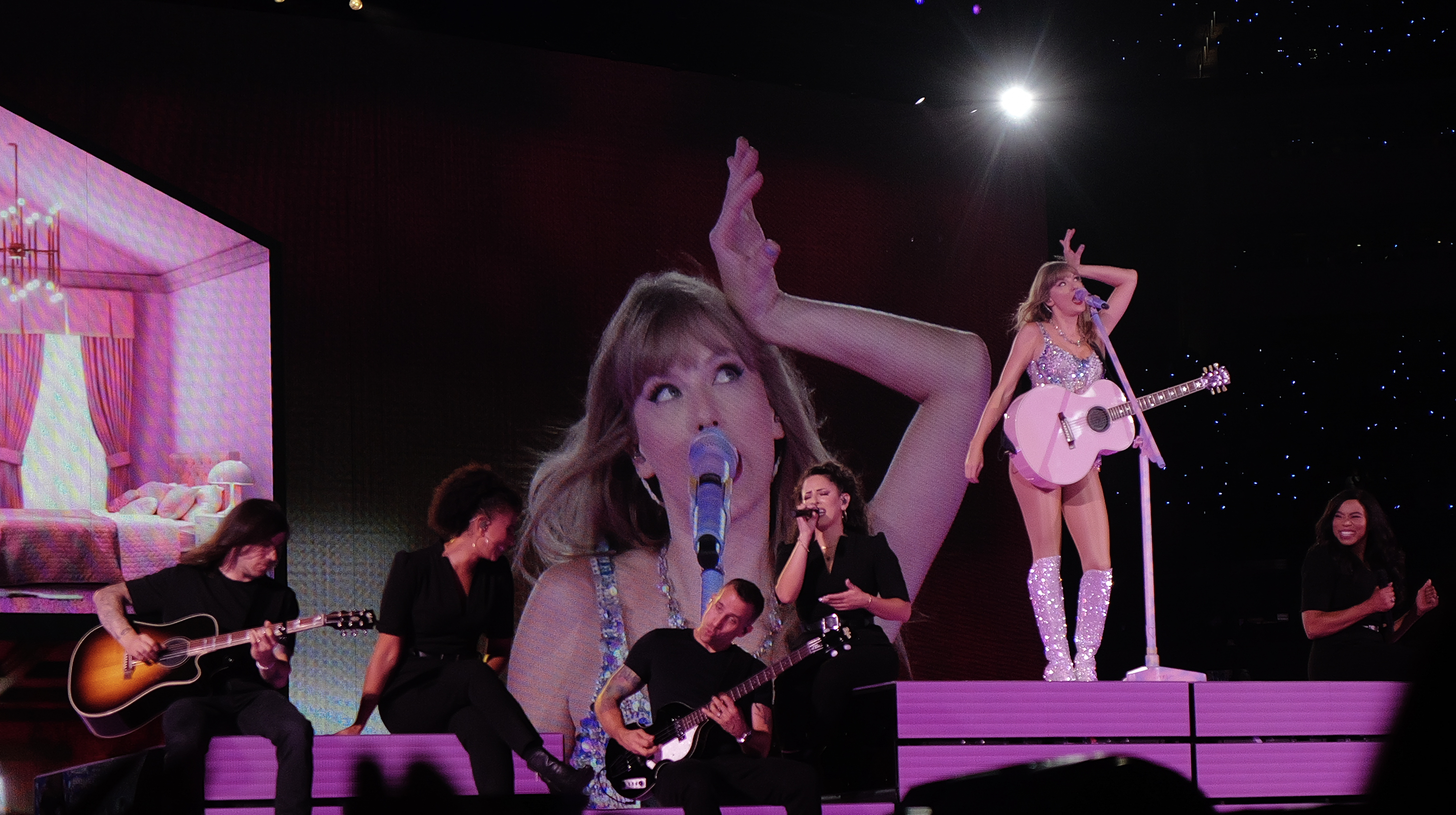
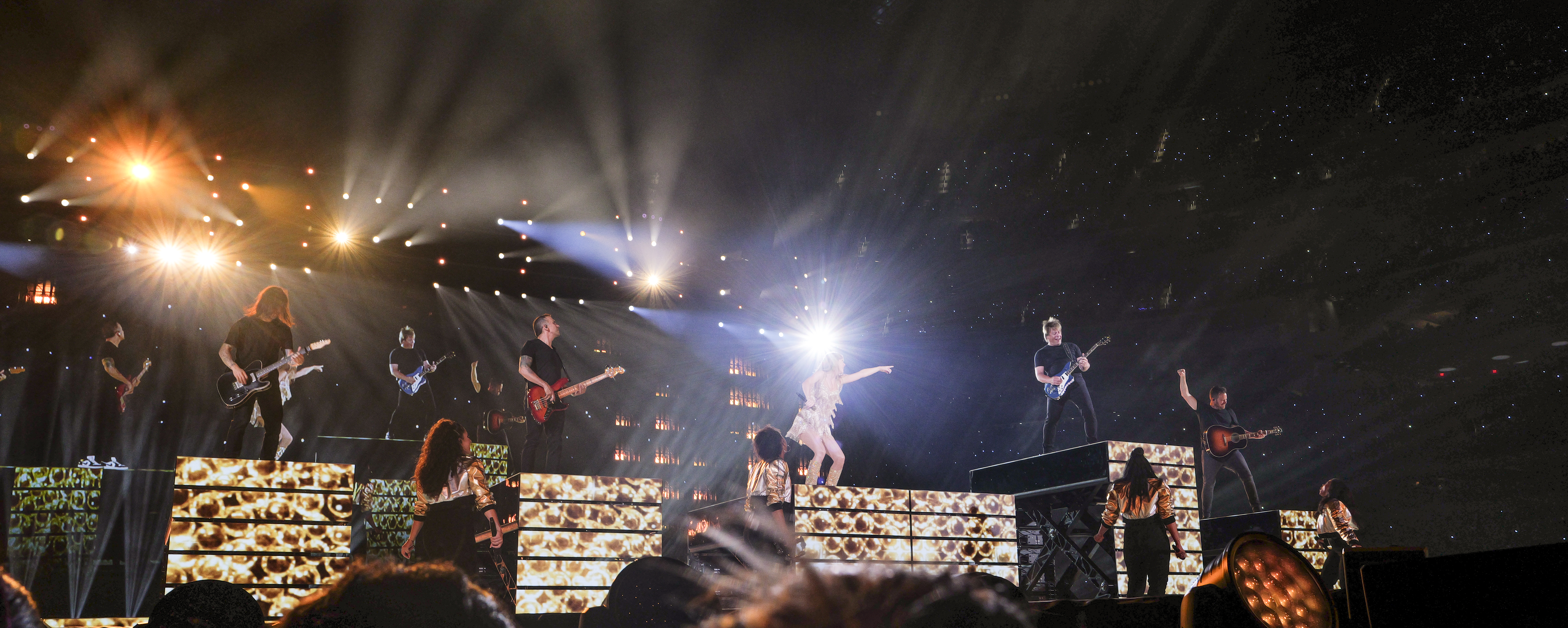
Swift performing with her band during the first two acts: Lover (top) and Fearless (bottom)

A typical show of the Eras Tour lasted 3 hours and 15 minutes. It consisted of between 44 and 46 songs, grouped into 10 acts, representing each "musical era" of her discography. Each act was characterized by a specific color scheme, costume, and stage design, and transitions between acts were facilitated by on-screen interlude visuals and marked by costume changes with negligible intermissions.

=== March 2023 to March 2024 ===
The show commenced with the Lover act. A clock on-screen counted down to show time as Lesley Gore's "You Don't Own Me" (1964) played. Surrounded by dancers in pastel-colored, fan-like tapestry, Swift emerged from the platform at mid-stage in a bodysuit and boots. She opened the show with the chorus of "Miss Americana & the Heartbreak Prince" leading into "Cruel Summer". Accompanied by dancers, Swift performed "The Man" and "You Need to Calm Down" in a sequined blazer, through a set emulating office cubicles. She then delivered the welcome note with the dollhouse from the "Lover" music video on-screen, depicting her various album eras. She played an acoustic version of "Lover" on the guitar with her band, backup singers, and dancers, followed by a stripped-down rendition of "The Archer" alone on the ramp. The second act, Fearless, began with the screen showing gold electric sparks raining down. Swift reappeared in a metallic fringed dress and country boots. She performed "Fearless" on the main stage, "You Belong with Me" at mid-stage, and "Love Story" on the T-stage, all alongside her band while her backup singers wore metallic gold and silver jackets and black jumpsuits.

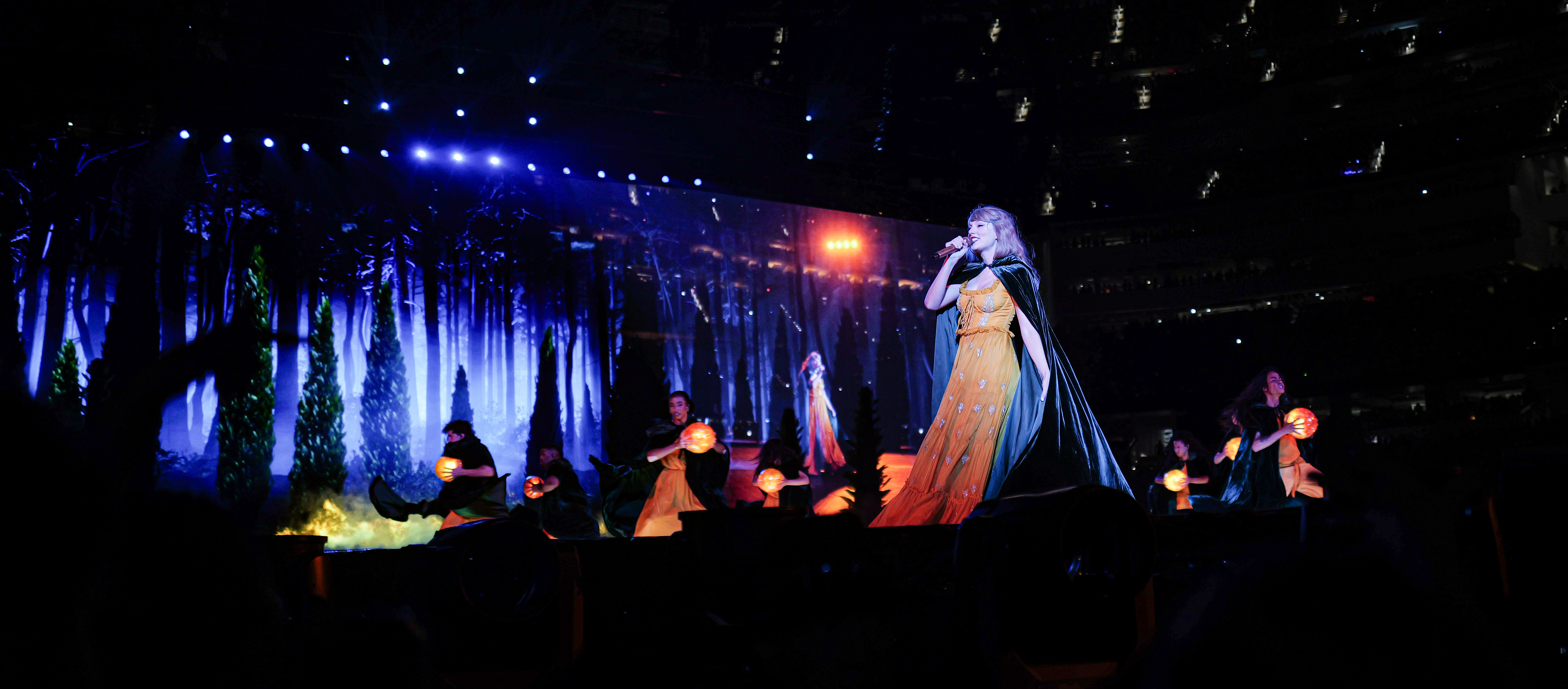
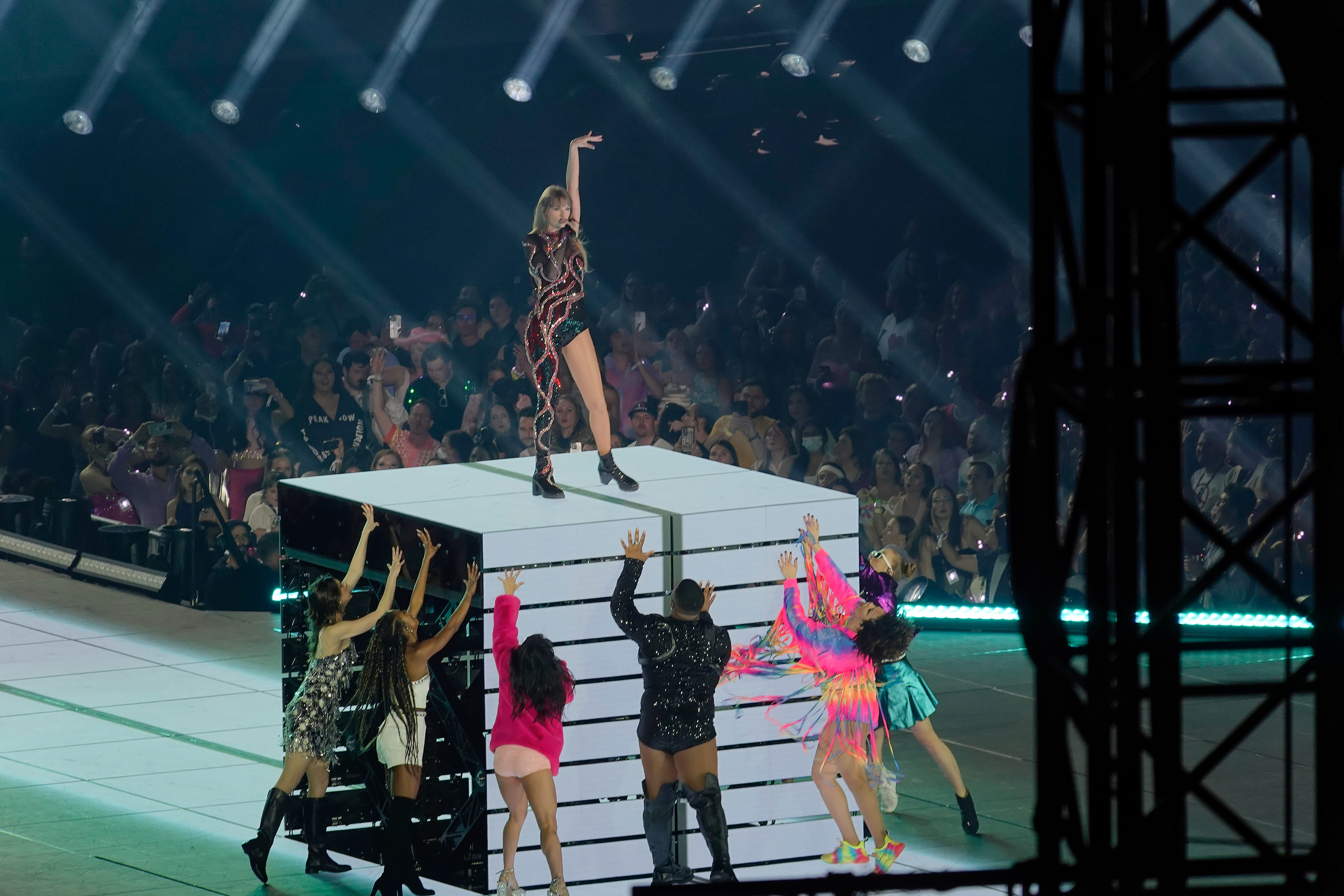
Swift performing "Willow" and "Look What You Made Me Do" as part of the Evermore (top) and Reputation (bottom) acts

The third act, Evermore, adopted a forest aesthetic. Swift began singing "'Tis the Damn Season" in a long gown, followed by a dark theme that leads to "Willow" in a "witchy" séance; she wore a cape and performed with dancers holding luminescent orange orbs. She continued with "Marjorie", then "Champagne Problems" on a moss-covered piano beneath an oak tree, concluding the act with Swift introducing her pianist Karina DePiano followed by "Tolerate It" with a male dancer at a dinner table reminiscent of Citizen Kane (1941). Snakes visuals and dimming lights started the Reputation act. Swift reemerged in a black asymmetrical catsuit with snake motifs. She delivered a high-energy performance of "...Ready for It?" with female dancers wearing black-dark red gothic leotards, "Delicate", and "Don't Blame Me" featured light beams and Swift on an elevated platform. She transitioned to "Look What You Made Me Do", which featured on-screen visuals of Swift from all of her eras trapped in glass boxes and dancers dressed in some of Swift's older looks. The act concluded with a snake and elephant slithering away on-screen.

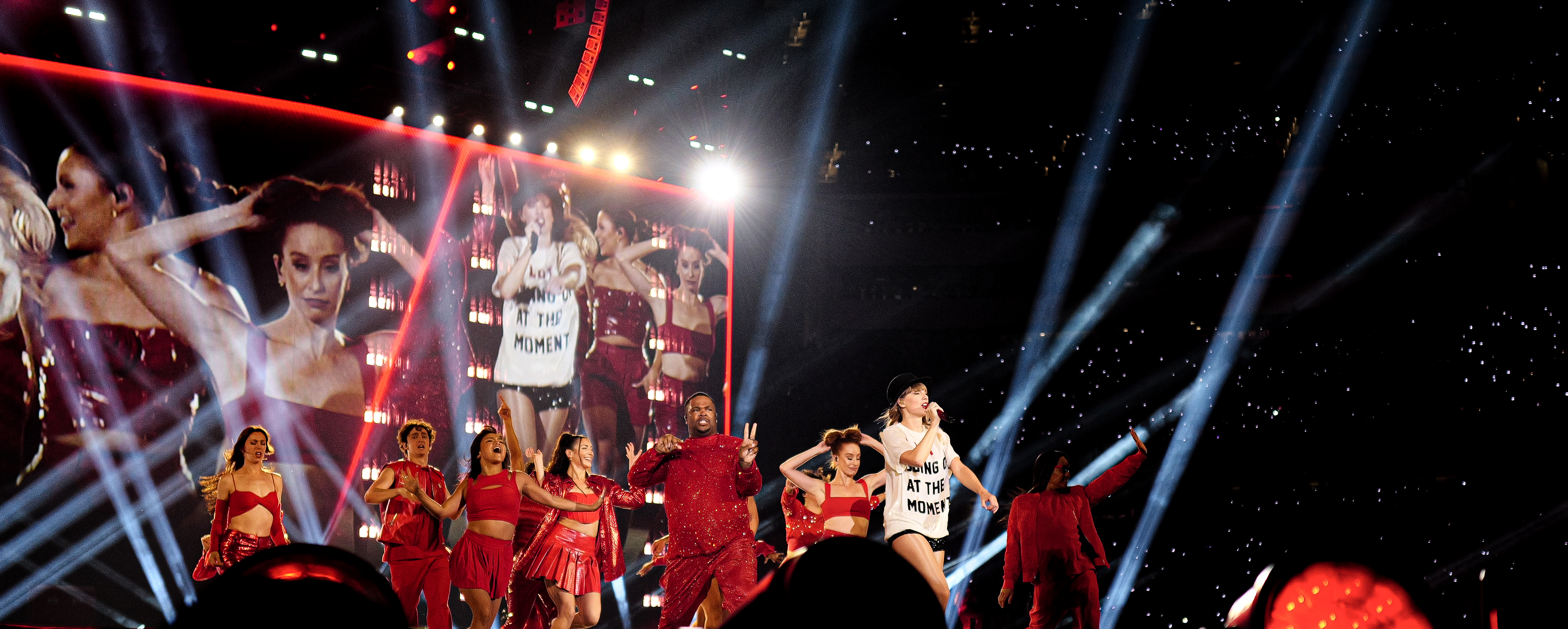
For the Red act, Swift wore a custom Gladys Tamez black fedora hat that she presented to a fan from the audience while performing "22".

The fifth act, Speak Now, began with an abstract mosaic of purple lights on the stage. Swift, in a ball gown, walked in from the screen and performed "Enchanted" with female dancers; since July 7, 2023, she also performed "Long Live" with her band. The color scheme changed to match the next act, Red; a female dancer opened a box that plays snippets of "Red", "Everything Has Changed" or "Holy Ground", and "State of Grace". Red balloons emerged, and Swift performed "22" wearing a version of the white T-shirt and black hat from the song's music video. Near the end of the song, she greeted a fan pre-selected from the audience, giving them the hat. Swift sang "We Are Never Ever Getting Back Together" and "I Knew You Were Trouble" with male dancers next, dressed in a red-black romper. She donned a red-black ombre coat next, and performed "All Too Well (10 Minute Version)" on a guitar, backed by the band. The act concluded with artificial snow falling.

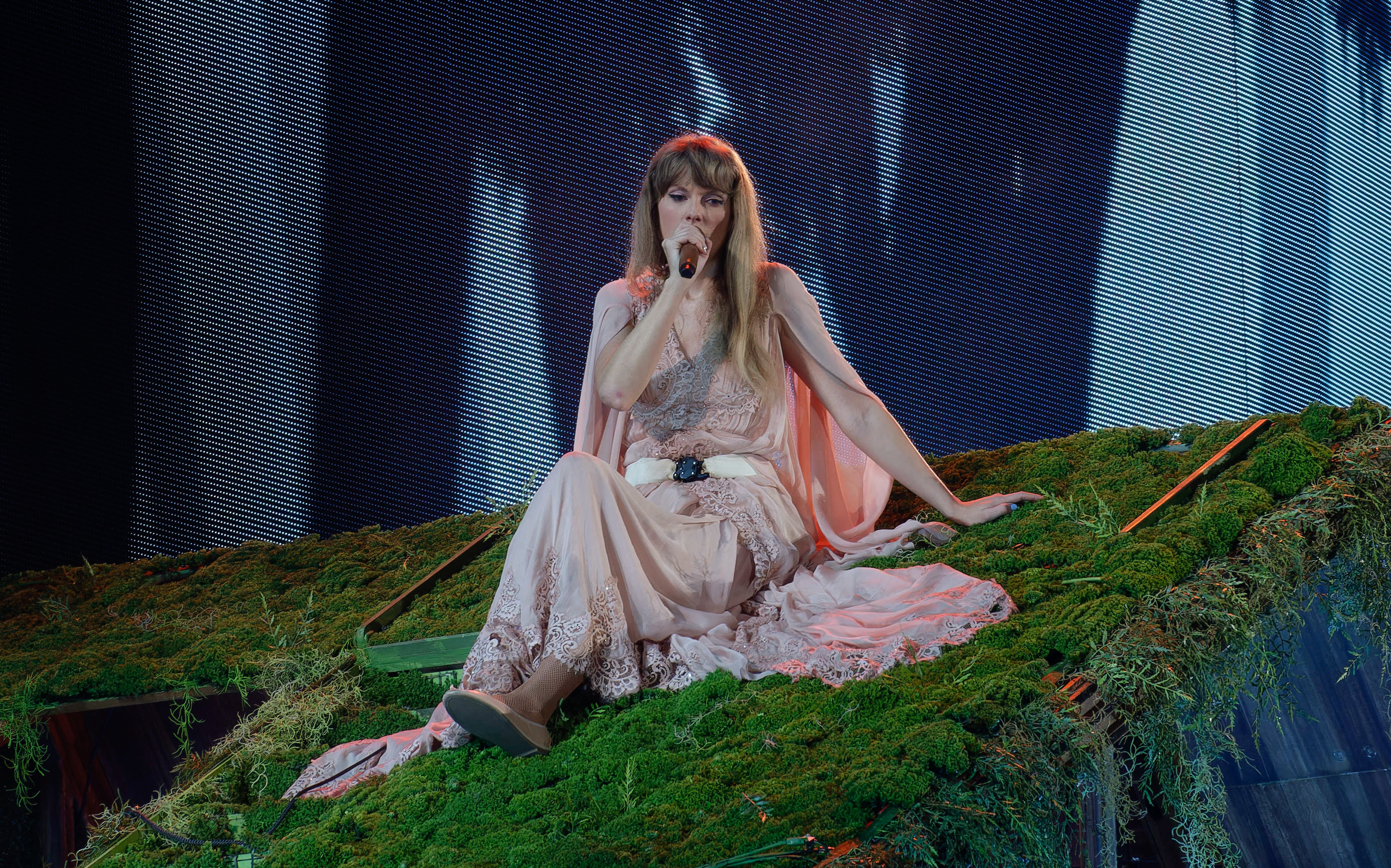
Swift in a frilly Alberta Ferretti gown for the Folklore act, complementing the album's cottagecore aesthetic

Cottagecore dominated the seventh act, Folklore, introduced with a spoken-word interlude of "Seven". Onstage is a bucolic, A-frame cabin setup, similar to the one from Swift's performance at the 63rd Annual Grammy Awards (2021), on an elevated platform with a staircase. Swift performed "Invisible String" or "The 1" on the cabin's roof, "Betty" with her band, and "The Last Great American Dynasty" with dancers dressed in period clothing. She then sang "August", which transitioned to the bridge of a rock-tinged "Illicit Affairs", followed by "My Tears Ricochet" with female dancers wearing sparkly black long sleeved dresses and choreography resembling a funeral procession. Swift returned to the cabin to perform "Cardigan", ending the act with fireflies as the cabin retreated.

1989, the eighth act, commenced with the screen showing a neon-lit city skyline. Swift, wearing a crop top and skirt, sang "Style" with dancers dressed in black-and-white outfits. Moving to mid-stage, female dancers rode neon bicycles for "Blank Space" and used blue golf clubs to smash an animated Shelby Cobra car. She followed with "Shake It Off", performed as a robust dance party; "Wildest Dreams", backed with backup singers and clips of a couple in bed; and "Bad Blood", with female dancers and accentuated by intense pyrotechnics. It was followed by the acoustic set, where Swift performed two surprise songs on guitar and piano. In an optical illusion, a body of water developed around the piano and enveloped the stage; Swift then dove into the stage and appeared to swim underwater, along the ramp and toward the main stage.

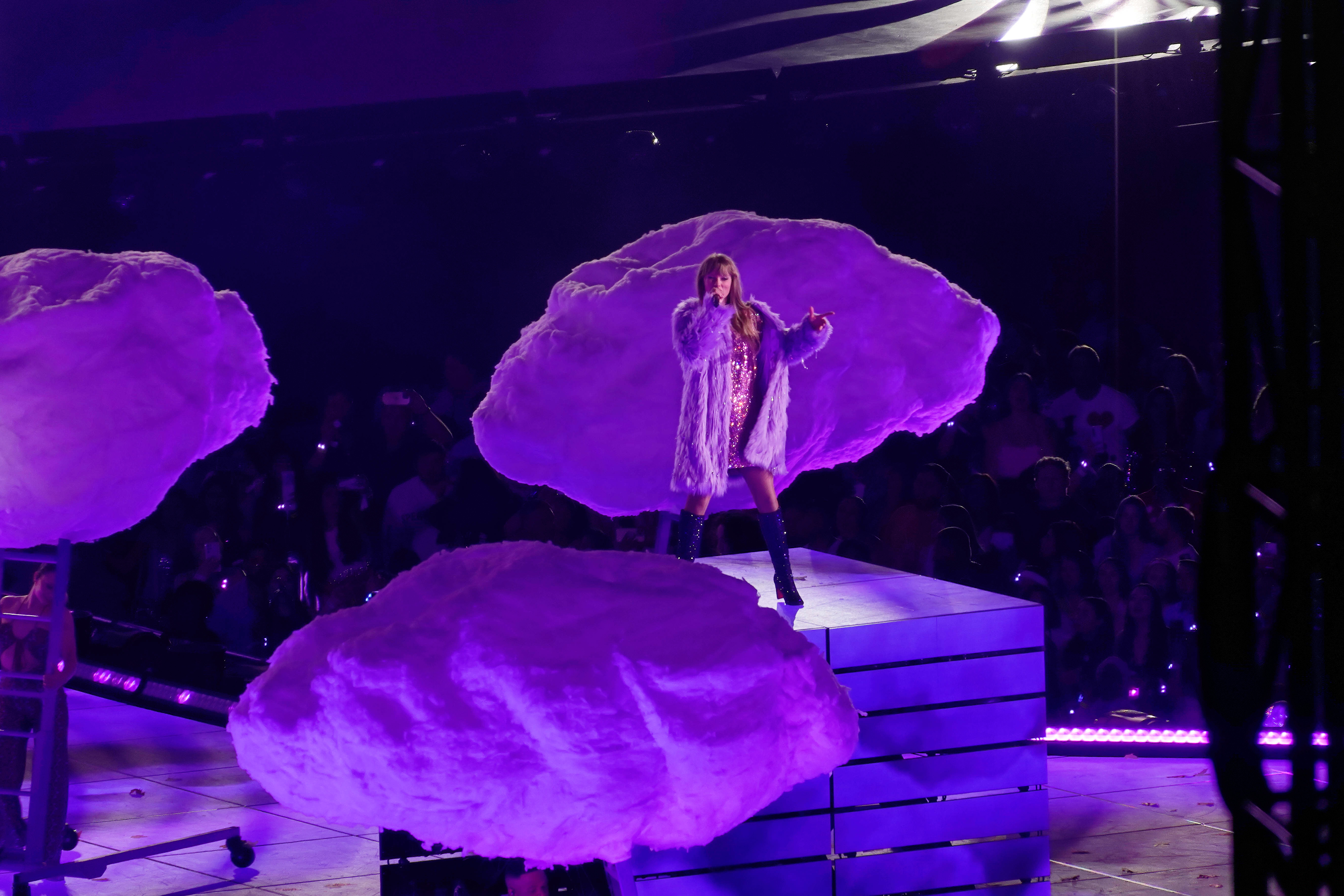
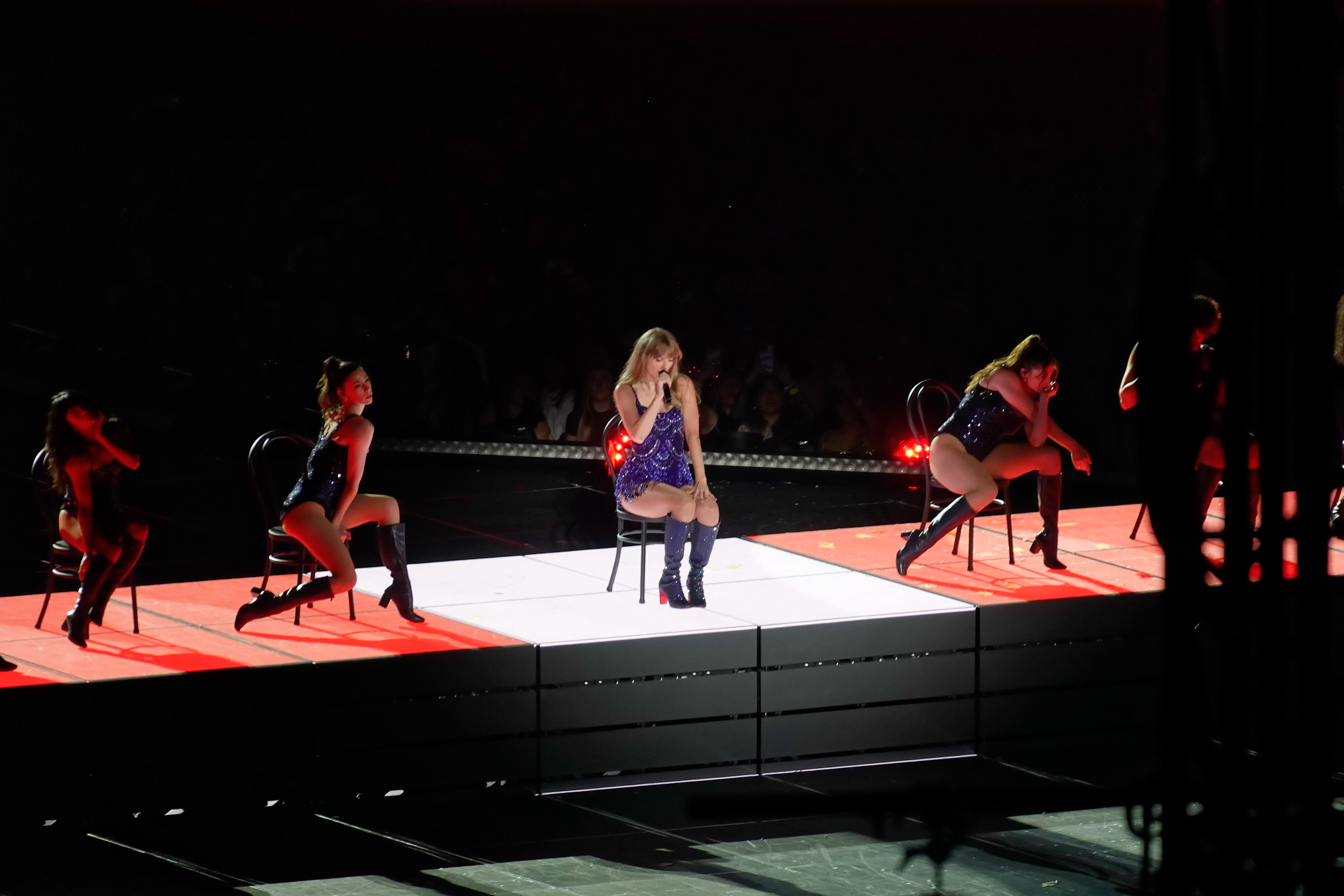
Swift performing "Lavender Haze" and "Vigilante Shit" during the Midnights act

The final act, Midnights, began with a wave from the illusion crashing against the screen; Swift woke up from a bed and climbed a ladder into a cloud. The lower screen split, and dancers carried out clouds as Swift reemerged in a purple faux fur coat, a glittery oversized shirt, and dark blue boots to sing "Lavender Haze". She removed the coat and performed "Anti-Hero" alongside a video of herself as a creature terrorizing a city. Dancers performed with umbrellas as Swift sang "Midnight Rain" and changed costumes, reappeared in a rhinestone-adorned midnight blue bodysuit. She then performed a "chair dance" choreographed for "Vigilante Shit", influenced by "sultry" burlesque and the 1975 musical Chicago. Swift followed with "Bejeweled", featuring moves inspired by the song's viral TikTok dance, and "Mastermind" with the entire dance crew wearing black robes. "Karma" was performed last, with Swift, backup singers, and dancers in tinsel-fringed jackets, closing the show with fireworks, colorful visuals, and confetti.

=== May to December 2024 ===
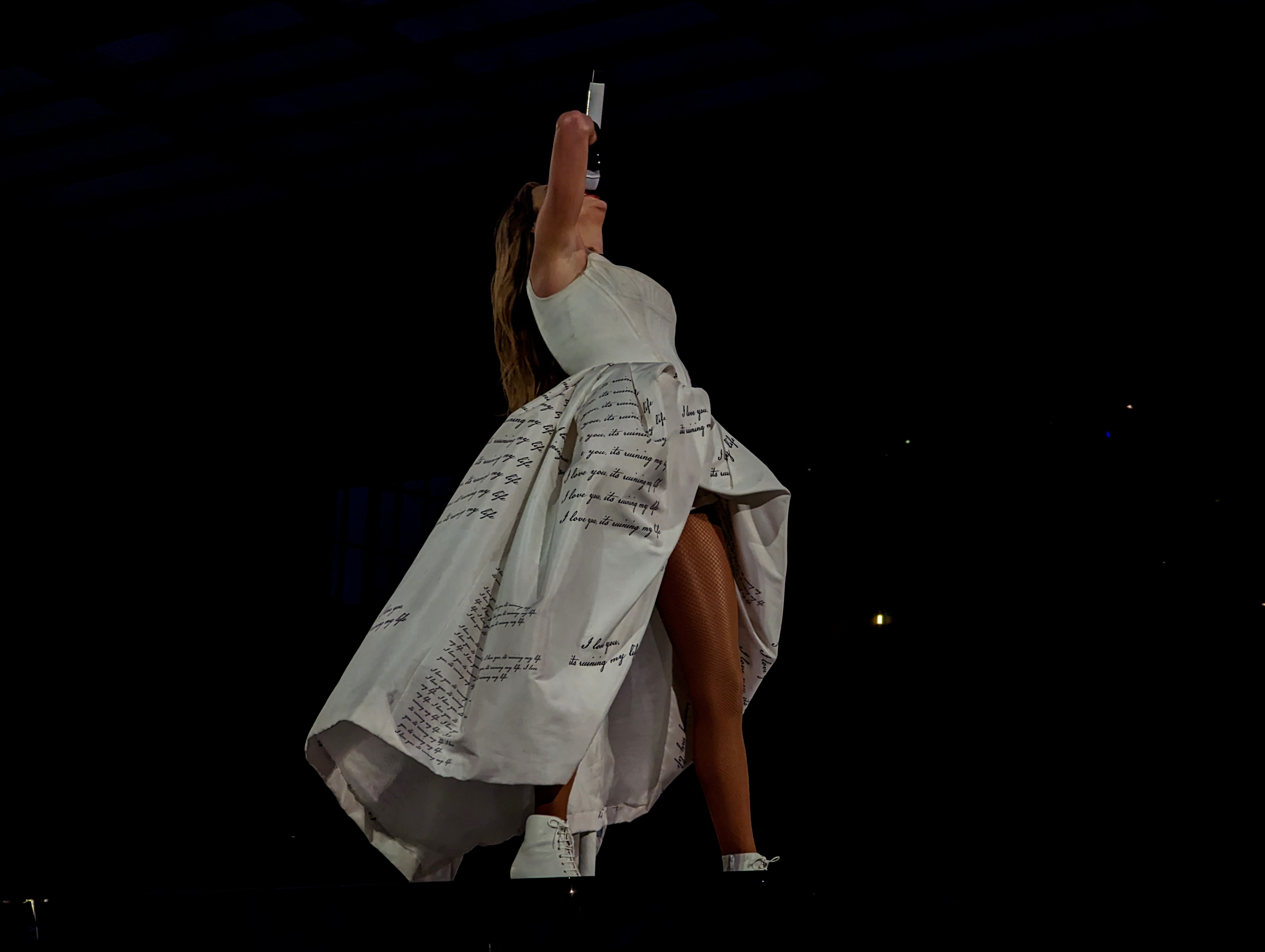

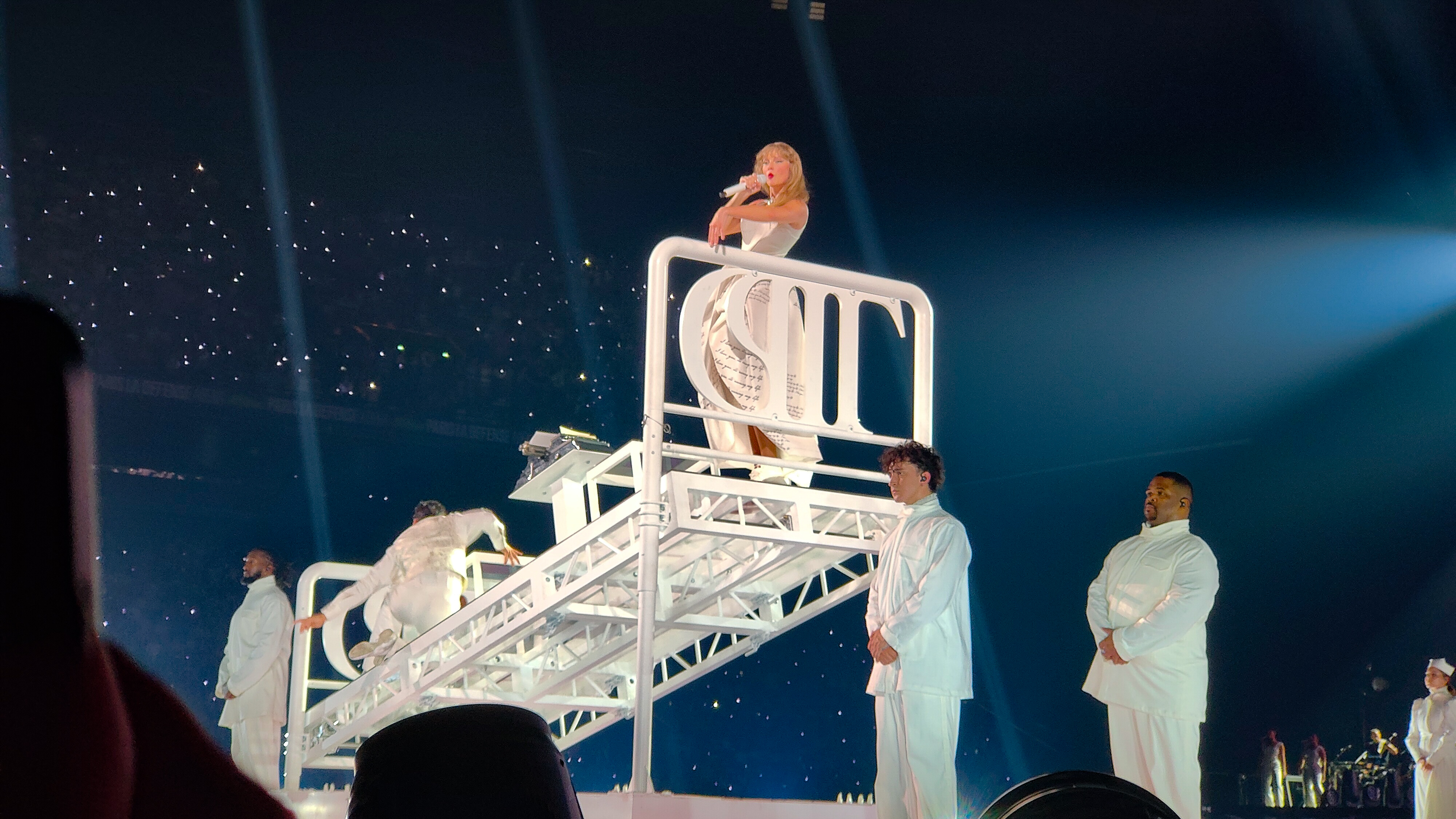
Swift performing "Who's Afraid of Little Old Me?" on a moving glass-plated block (top) and "Fortnight" on a bed emblazoned with the album's logo (bottom) for The Tortured Poets Department act

Starting from May 2024, Swift revamped the set list to include a new act with songs from her eleventh studio album, The Tortured Poets Department, released on April 19, 2024. "The Archer", "Long Live", "The 1", "The Last Great American Dynasty", "'Tis the Damn Season", and "Tolerate It" were removed from their respective acts to accommodate the album. The Speak Now and Red acts were brought forward as the fourth and third acts, while the acts for Folklore and Evermore, which are considered "sister albums", merged into one. The Tortured Poets Department act was placed between the 1989 act and acoustic set.

The Tortured Poets Department act featured predominantly black-and-white graphics, drawing from dark academia. It began with the screen showing pieces of furniture descending from the sky alongside paper pieces, which then transform into a deserted road and the furniture crash down. Swift appeared onstage in a white corset dress with handwritten lyrics and sings "But Daddy I Love Him" and parts of "So High School", alongside dancers dressed in white. She performed "Who's Afraid of Little Old Me?" on a moving glass-plated block and appeared to levitate in an illusion, which ended with the screen depicting an evil-possessed Swift. A UFO then appeared on screen and attempted to abduct Swift, who started singing "Down Bad" on the moving block that hovered over a digital galaxy. Transitioning to "Fortnight", the stage featured a "TTPD"-emblazoned bed and two female dancers dressed as nurses. Swift sang the song as she sat on a typewriter, across from a male dancer. She proceeded with "The Smallest Man Who Ever Lived", for which she put on a white marching band jacket as dancers marched beside her with drums. The act ended with a silent skit with two male dancers accompanied by enthusiastic jazz music, where Swift removed her dress to reveal a two-piece bodysuit, leading up to "I Can Do It with a Broken Heart".

At the end of the last shows of the tour, Swift exited the stage in the direction of a bright orange door on the screen. (Note: This is an Easter egg, hinting at Swift's next studio album, The Life of a Showgirl (2025), which was conceived by Swift during the European leg of the tour.)

== Critical reception ==
It's easy to compare one of Swift's stadium shows to something you'd see on Broadway—never has that been more true than for The Eras Tour. The setlist is cut up into acts, grouped by eras for each of Swift's ten studio albums. For each era/act, Swift went full-send into that album's look, feel, costume, color blocking, and more. [...] The Eras Tour is a feat. It’s live music at its highest spectacle and greatest excess. And for most, without the catalog and showmanship of Swift, it’d be too much. But 17 years into her career, maybe we ought to stop being surprised when she finds a way to top her own efforts year after year.

— David Waiss Aramesh, "Taylor Swift's The Eras Tour Is a 3-Hour Career-Spanning Victory Lap", Rolling Stone

The tour received "overwhelmingly positive" reviews from music and entertainment critics, who praised both the high-end spectacle and "polished artistry" of the tour. Billboard described the Eras Tour as "the must-see blockbuster of the year". Neil McCormick of The Daily Telegraph, Keiran Southern of The Times, Adrian Horton of The Guardian, Kelsey Barnes of The Independent, Ilana Kaplan of the i, and Erica Campbell of NME gave the Eras Tour total five-star ratings. McCormick called the show "one of the most ambitious, spectacular, and charming stadium pop shows ever seen", lauding Swift's musicianship, vocals, and energy. Southern declared the Eras Tour "a pop genius at the top of her game". Horton praised the "rapturous" music selection, concept, "extravagant" staging, and Swift's stamina and vocals. Barnes noted the tour as "a career-defining spectacle" with acts marking the shifts in Swift's artistry, while Kaplan commended the "unparalleled" showmanship, "spicier" choreography, camp styles, and "seamless" transitions between acts. Campbell praised the storytelling aspect of the show that ties all the 10 acts together, enhanced by staging, cinematic ambience and fashion. Australian Financial Review's James Thomson opined, "Swift works the massive stage like a master, cycling through countless costume changes and several elaborate sets, all while belting out 44 songs over three-and-a-half hours."

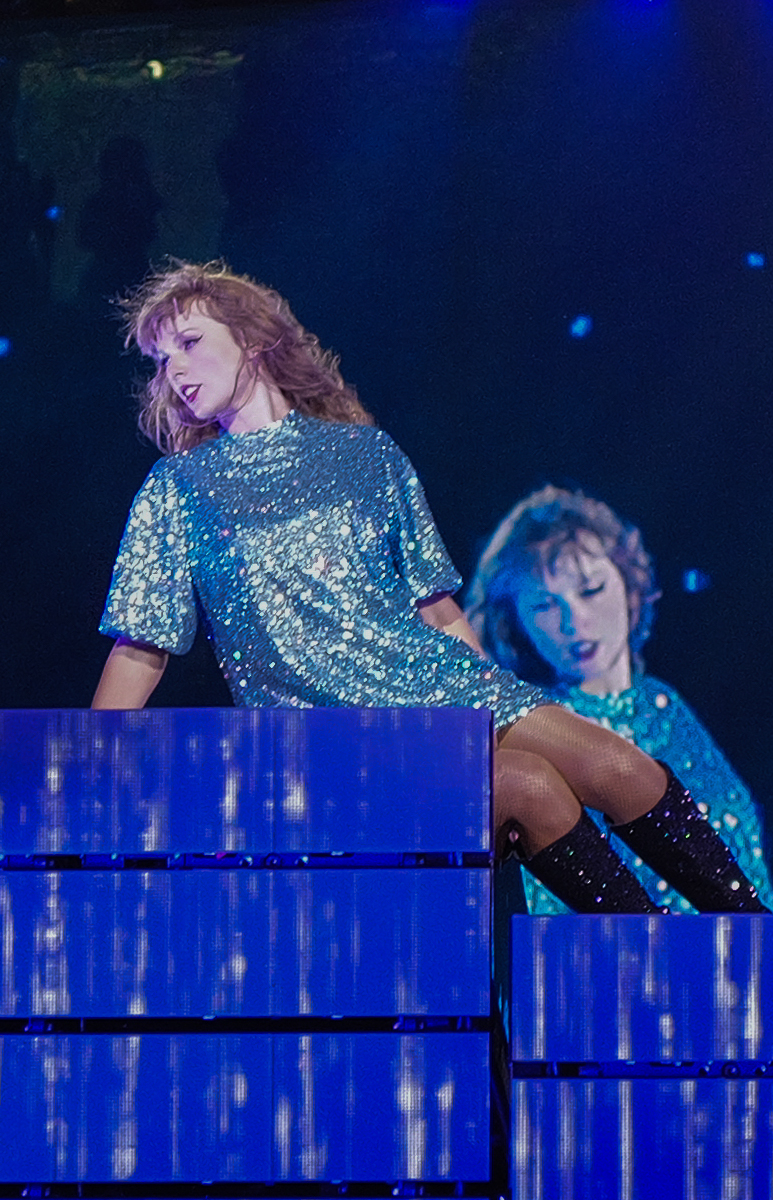
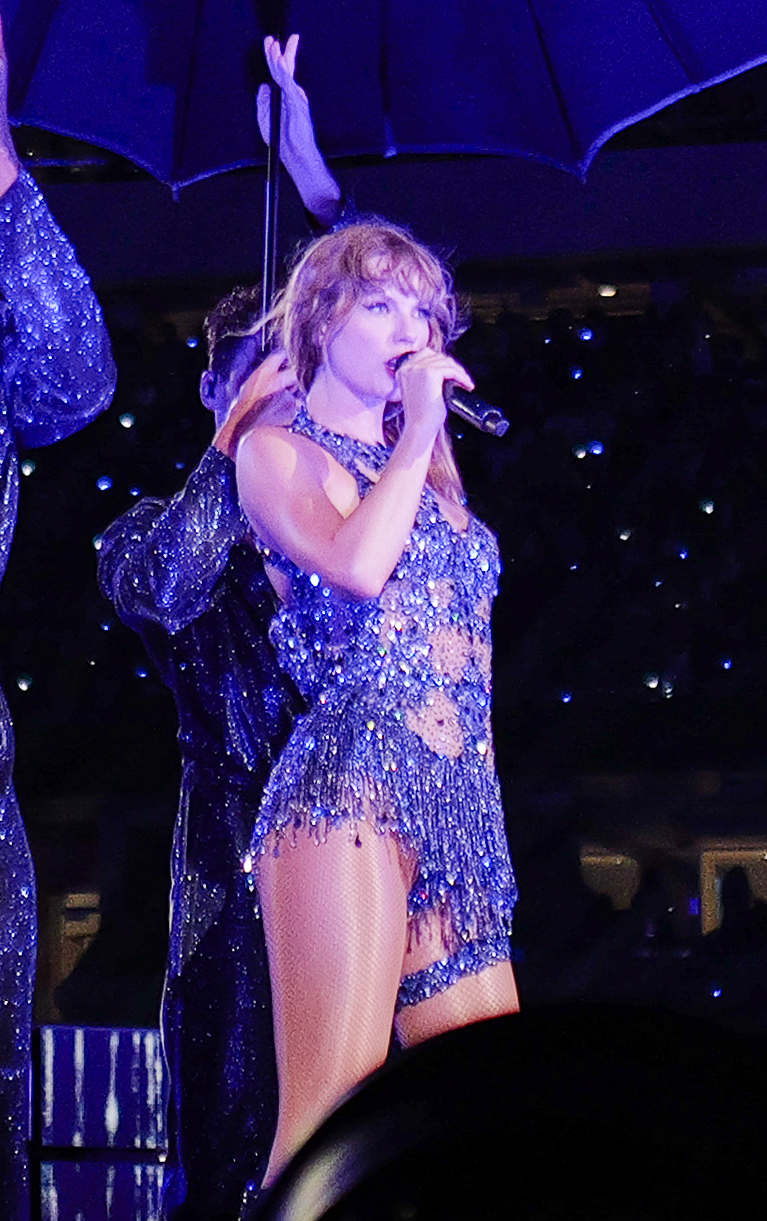
The show's performance styles, fashion and transitions were subjects of critical praise. Pictured is Swift's costume change from a glittery oversized shirt to a rhinestone-adorned bodysuit while singing "Midnight Rain".

The versatility of the show's music, visuals, and performance art was often a point of praise in its reviews. Journalists Rebecca Lewis and Carson Mlnarik of Hello! and MTV, respectively, commended Swift's stage presence and commitment to her artistry; Lewis described Swift's alter egos during the tour as shifting from "country ingénue to pop princess and folklore witch", whereas Mlnarik affirmed that the on-screen visuals stayed true to every album's aesthetic. The Week and Dallas Observer critics agreed, highlighting the "jaw-dropping" visuals and "bedazzled" fashion. Billboard editor Jason Lipshutz underscored Swift's "powerhouse" vocals, engaging artistic personas, and skill set. Jon Caramanica of The New York Times highlighted the tour's scale, ambition, and portrayal of all the musical pivots of Swift's career, whereas The Atlantic's Spencer Kornhaber complimented the show's art direction, suspense, and the sequencing of the acts. Mikael Wood of Los Angeles Times described the show as a "masterclass in pop ambition", showcasing Swift's range. According to The New Yorker senior editor Tyler Foggatt, the Eras Tour is a product of Swift's understanding of herself, building a tour "solely devoted to the idea of a trajectory—that of a career, of a musical identity, of a life—that can be traced cleanly from one era to the next."

Critics also appreciated the tour's production value and artistic direction. Philip Cosores of Uproxx dubbed it the "most impressive stadium show ever conceived". Spin critic Jonathan Cohen admired the rich stage design, usage of "state-of-the-art" technology, and immersive experience into Swift's "increasingly accomplished musical world-building". Variety journalist Chris Willman felt that the "epic" show demonstrated that "the person who has come up with the single greatest body of pop songwriting in the 21st century is also its most popular performer". Pollstar's Christina Fuoco and Andy Gensler praised the production as "stunning and tastefully rendered" and "live music at its highest spectacle". Rolling Stone's Waiss David Aramesh opined that it is "a production spectacle of the highest echelon". Melinda Sheckels of Consequence praised the tour's "nuanced and interpretive" approach in depicting Swift's albums and the "sheer magnitude, artistry, and technical prowess" of the production.

The revamped tour, following the release of The Tortured Poets Department, continued to receive rave reviews. Annabel Nugent of The Independent and Fiona Sheperd of The Scotsman praised the tour's choreography, state-of-the-art production, song selection, and Swift's consistent energy. McCormick declared, "there's no doubt that Taylor Swift is the best in the world right now." Critics Mark Sutherland and Anna Leszkiewicz opined that the tour's scale and performances continued to impress despite crossing 100 shows and being available as a film on streaming; Leszkiewicz, in New Statesman, described Swift as "a talented actress" with a "high camp" stage presence—"whether flashing faux-coy smiles, luxuriating in overdramatic eyerolls, or throwing herself into theatrical Wicked Witch of the West arm movements." Petridis described the tour in The Guardian as "an astonishing, risk-taking, strangely intimate extravaganza", adding it is pointless to review the tour anymore as "every conceivable detail has already been dissected and discussed in depth." Reviews published in the Berliner Zeitung and Süddeutsche Zeitung praised Swift for what they considered as a commanding stage presence and charisma that is rare in her peers.

== Commercial performance ==
=== Box score ===
The Eras Tour broke a string of ticket sales records worldwide. In the first day of the US presale alone, the tour sold over 2.4 million tickets, the most sold by an artist in a single day, surpassing Robbie Williams, who had sold 1.6 million tickets for his Close Encounters Tour in 2005. Billboard reported on December 15 that the Eras Tour had already grossed an estimated US$554 million, and projected the US leg to finish with $591 million, surpassing the former all-time female record set by Madonna's Sticky & Sweet Tour ($407 million) in 2008–2009. Following the tour's launch, Swift rose to number one on Pollstar's Artist Power Index chart. MetLife Stadium named her their "No. 1 best-selling artist" of all time after the tour's third East Rutherford show, which was the 100th concert in the stadium's history.

In June 2023, The Wall Street Journal reported that the Eras Tour "on track to become the biggest in concert history, with the potential to gross over $1 billion"; Pollstar estimates projected a $1.4 billion gross. Bloomberg News reported that the average gross per show on the US leg was $13 million. According to Forbes, the Eras Tour has grossed $780 million from 56 shows as of August 2023, making it the highest-grossing tour by a woman in history based on its first North American leg alone, surpassing Beyoncé's Renaissance World Tour. In November 2023, Billboard estimated a gross of over $900 million from the tour thus far and that the total could nearly double after the 2024 shows. Swift's team stated they do not intend to announce the box score, but Pollstar reported in December 2023 an estimated gross of $1,039,263,762 from 60 shows that year, making the Eras Tour the highest-grossing concert tour ever and the first to reach the $1 billion mark. In June 2024, the BBC News estimated 11 million tickets sold across the entire tour. In October 2024, Forbes reported that the tour had grossed an additional $1.15 billion from 65 shows in 2024, bringing the tour's estimated gross up to $1.93 billion.

After the tour concluded in December 2024, The New York Times published the first gross reported by Taylor Swift Touring, Swift's production company. The publication revealed that the tour grossed $2.07 billion with an attendance of 10.1 million. Pollstar's final estimate was $2.2 billion from 10.055 million tickets, making Swift the first solo act in history to sell over 10 million tickets on a single tour. With an average of 67,487 tickets, she broke U2 360° Tour's record for highest attendance per show. Inc. opined that Swift could have made an additional $1.5 billion if she had adopted traditional ticketing strategies like other artists.

=== Venue records ===
†	Indicates a former venue record

	Dates	Venue	Region	Description	Ref.
2023	March 17–18	State Farm Stadium	United States	First act to perform two shows on a single tour	
2023	March 24–25	Allegiant Stadium	United States	First female act to perform one and two shows on a single tour	
2023	March 31 – April 2	AT&T Stadium	United States	First act to perform three shows on a single tour	
2023	March 31 – April 2	AT&T Stadium	United States	Biggest three-day attendance (210,607)	
2023	April 13–15	Raymond James Stadium	United States	First act to perform two and three shows on a single tour	
2023	April 21–23	NRG Stadium	United States	First act to perform three shows on a single tour	
2023	April 28–30	Mercedes-Benz Stadium	United States	First act to perform three shows on a single tour	
2023	May 5–7	Nissan Stadium	United States	First act to perform three shows on a single tour	
2023	May 7	Nissan Stadium	United States	Biggest single-day attendance (71,000) † (Note: This record was broken by Ed Sheeran's +–=÷× Tour concert on July 22, 2023.)	
2023	May 12–14	Lincoln Financial Field	United States	First female act to perform three shows on a single tour	
2023	May 26–28	MetLife Stadium	United States	Biggest three-day attendance (217,635)	
2023	June 2–4	Soldier Field	United States	First female act to perform three shows on a single tour	
2023	June 9–10	Ford Field	United States	First female act to perform two shows on a single tour	
2023	June 16–17	Acrisure Stadium	United States	First act to perform two shows on a single tour	
2023	June 17	Acrisure Stadium	United States	Biggest single-day attendance (73,117)	
2023	June 30 – July 1	Paycor Stadium	United States	First female act to perform one and two shows on a single tour	
2023	July 7–8	Arrowhead Stadium	United States	First act to perform two shows on a single tour	
2023	July 14–15	Empower Field at Mile High	United States	First act to perform two shows on a single tour	
2023	July 22 and 23	Lumen Field	United States	First act to perform two shows on a single tour	
2023	July 22	Lumen Field	United States	Biggest single-day attendance (72,171)	
2023	August 3–9	SoFi Stadium	United States	First act to perform five and six shows on a single tour	
2023	August 24–27	Foro Sol	Mexico	First female act to perform four shows on a single tour	
2023	November 17–20	Estádio Olímpico Nilton Santos	Brazil	First female act to perform three shows on a single tour	
2023	November 24–26	Allianz Parque	Brazil	Biggest three-day attendance	
2023	November 26	Allianz Parque	Brazil	Biggest single-day attendance	
2024	February 7–10	Tokyo Dome	Japan	First international female act to perform four consecutive days	
2024	February 16–18	Melbourne Cricket Ground	Australia	Biggest three-day attendance (288,000)	
2024	February 23–26	Accor Stadium	Australia	First act to perform four shows on a single tour	
2024	March 2–4 and 7–9	Singapore National Stadium	Singapore	First solo act to perform three to six shows on a single tour	
2024	March 9	Singapore National Stadium	Singapore	Biggest single-day attendance (63,000)	
2024	May 19	Friends Arena	Sweden	Biggest single-day attendance (60,243)	
2024	May 17–19	Friends Arena	Sweden	Biggest three-day attendance (178,679)	
2024	May 24–25	Estádio da Luz	Portugal	First female act to perform one and two shows at the stadium	
2024	June 3	Groupama Stadium	France	Biggest single-day attendance for a female act (61,000)	
2024	June 9	Murrayfield Stadium	United Kingdom	Biggest single-day concert attendance in Scottish history (73,000)	
2024	June 13	Anfield	United Kingdom	Biggest single-day attendance (62,000)	
2024	June 21–23; August 15–17 and 19–20	Wembley Stadium	United Kingdom	First solo act to perform four to eight shows on a single tour	
2024	June 28–30	Aviva Stadium	Ireland	First act to perform three shows on a single tour	
2024	August 1–3	PGE Narodowy	Poland	First act to perform three shows on a single tour	
2024	August 8–10	Ernst-Happel-Stadion	Austria	First act to schedule three shows on a single tour	
2024	October 18–20	Hard Rock Stadium	United States	First act to perform three shows on a single tour	
2024	October 25–27	Caesars Superdome	United States	First act to perform two and three shows on a single tour	
2024	November 1–3	Lucas Oil Stadium	United States	First act to perform two and three shows on a single tour	
2024	November 1–3	Lucas Oil Stadium	United States	Biggest single-day attendance (69,000)	
2024	November 14–16 and 21–23	Rogers Centre	Canada	First act to perform six shows on a single tour	
2024	December 6–8	BC Place	Canada	First act to perform three shows on a single tour	

== Spin-off media ==
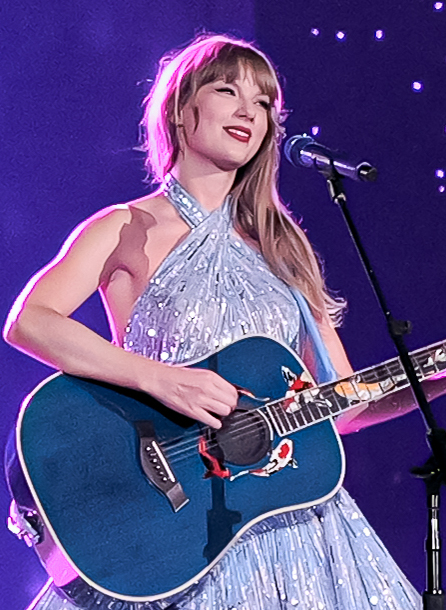
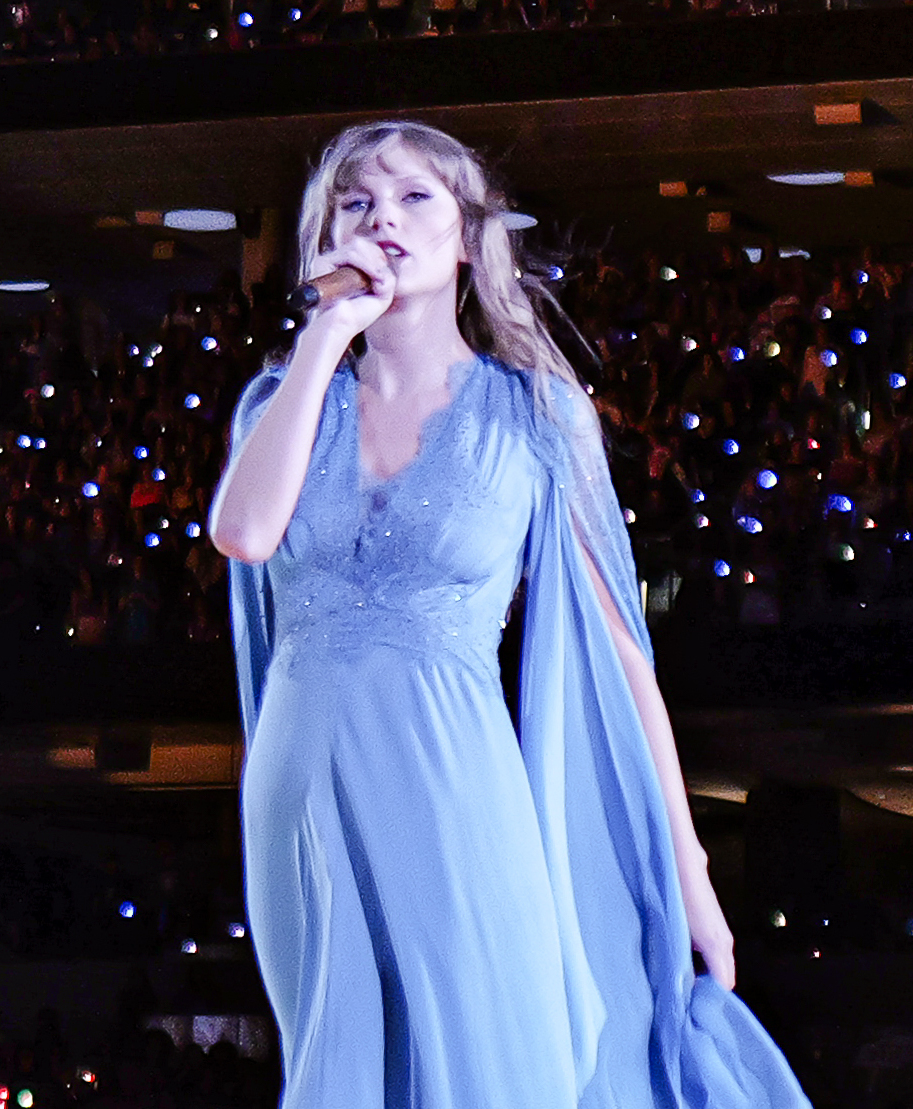
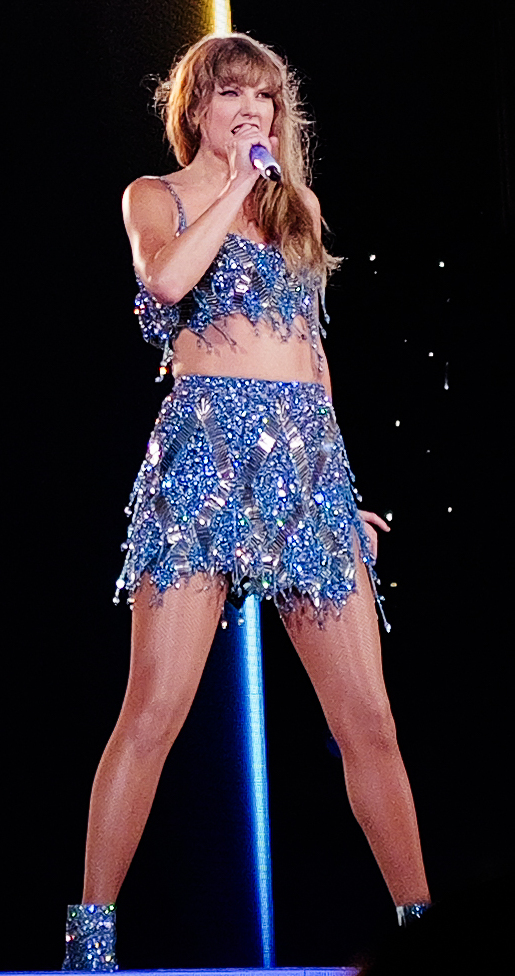
Swift wore blue variants of her outfits for the Speak Now, Folklore, and 1989 acts to tease 1989 (Taylor's Version), her fourth re-recorded album, at the final show in Los Angeles's SoFi Stadium on August 9, 2023.

Swift unveiled various musical works during the tour. On the day of the opening show, she released four songs to celebrate the tour's launch: the re-recordings of "Eyes Open" and "Safe & Sound", both originally from the 2012 soundtrack The Hunger Games: Songs from District 12 and Beyond; a re-recording of "If This Was a Movie", one of the deluxe tracks from Speak Now (2010); and "All of the Girls You Loved Before", a previously unreleased outtake of Lover.

A special CD edition of Midnights, subtitled The Late Night Edition, was released during the Eras Tour. It was only purchasable in-person at merchandise stands at certain shows, beginning in East Rutherford, New Jersey, on May 26, 2023. It exclusively contained the bonus track "You're Losing Me", which became a "ravenously anticipated" song; Variety reported that "fans were so eager to get their hands" on the CD, causing queues at the stadium the day before the merchandise store opened.

On May 5, 2023, at the first Nashville show of the tour, Swift announced her third re-recorded album, Speak Now (Taylor's Version), and its release date as July 7. A digital deluxe version of Speak Now (Taylor's Version) contained two live recordings from the tour as bonus tracks. She also premiered two music videos, both of which she wrote and directed, during the tour. She premiered the videos for "Karma" featuring American rapper Ice Spice and "I Can See You" before the acoustic set at the first East Rutherford show and first Kansas City show, respectively. On August 9, at the final Los Angeles show, Swift announced 1989 (Taylor's Version) as her fourth re-recorded album, which was released on October 27, exactly nine years after the release of the original 1989 album. On November 3, Hits reported that a live album of the tour was discussed.

On October 13, 2023, Swift released the self-produced concert film, Taylor Swift: The Eras Tour, directed by Sam Wrench, to theaters worldwide. It was produced from the footage recorded at the tour's Los Angeles shows. The film, in an unprecedented move, had Swift partnering directly with the theaters to both distribute and exhibit the film instead of a major film studio. It received critical acclaim for capturing the spectacle and energy of the show and became the highest-grossing concert film of all time.

On February 16, 2024, at the first Melbourne show, Swift announced a second variant of The Tortured Poets Department, with a bonus track titled "The Bolter". She announced another variant of the album, with the bonus track "The Albatross" on February 23, at the first Sydney show. The fourth variant of the album, containing the bonus track "The Black Dog", was announced on March 3, at the second Singapore show of the tour. On August 20, Swift premiered the music video for "I Can Do It with a Broken Heart", a song inspired by the tour after leaving the stage at the end of the eighth show in London. The video features footage of tour performances, rehearsals, audiences, and backstage moments. Throughout the tour Swift released limited-time digital deluxe versions of The Tortured Poets Department, each with a different live recording of songs from the album.

On October 15, 2024, Swift announced her first-ever book, The Eras Tour Book. Dubbed "the official retrospective" of the tour, it is a 256-page photo book with over 500 on-stage and behind-the-scenes images, as well as Swift's personal reflections and notes. Concurrently, Swift launched her in-house publishing imprint, Taylor Swift Publications. The book was released exclusively in Target stores on a Black Friday—November 29, 2024. Selling over a million copies in its first week in the US alone, the book became the best-selling book of 2024. On January 16, 2025, Swift released three limited-time digital versions of Lover (Live from Paris), each with a live recording of a song from Lover performed on the tour.

A documentary series, The End of an Era, premiered through Disney+ on December 12, 2025, released over the course of a three-week period, concluding on December 23. Directed by Don Argott and produced by Object & Animal, the six-episode series features an "intimate look" at Swift's life while on tour. Additionally, a second concert film documenting the tour was released on December 12. Directed by Glenn Weiss and filmed at the tour's final show in Vancouver in December 2024, The Eras Tour: The Final Show includes The Tortured Poets Department act, which was absent from the first concert film.

== Accolades ==
Accolades
Award/Organization	Year	Category	Result	Ref.
MTV Video Music Awards	2023	Show of the Summer	Won	
Guinness World Records	2023	Highest-Grossing Music Tour	Won	
Guinness World Records	2023	Highest-Grossing Music Tour by a Female Artist	Won	
Guinness World Records	2023	Highest-Grossing Music Tour in a Single Year	Won	
Guinness World Records	2023	Highest-Grossing Music Tour by a Female Artist (2023)	Won	
Guinness World Records	2023	Highest-Grossing Music Tour by a Solo Artist	Won	
Guinness World Records	2023	Highest-Grossing Music Tour Per Concert by a Female Artist	Won	
MTV Europe Music Awards	2023	Best Live Act	Won	
People's Choice Awards	2024	The Concert Tour of the Year	Won	
Pollstar Awards	2024	Major Tour of the Year	Won	
Pollstar Awards	2024	Brand Partnership/Live Campaign of the Year (AMC Theatres)	Won	
Pollstar Awards	2024	Pop Tour of the Year	Nominated	
Pollstar Awards	2024	Support/Special Guest of the Year (Phoebe Bridgers)	Nominated	
Pollstar Awards	2025	Major Tour of the Year	Won	
Pollstar Awards	2025	Pop Tour of the Year	Nominated	
Pollstar Awards	2025	Support/Special Guest of the Year (Gracie Abrams)	Nominated	
iHeartRadio Music Awards	2024	Favorite Tour Style of the Year	Won	
iHeartRadio Music Awards	2024	Tour of the Year	Won	
iHeartRadio Music Awards	2025	Favorite Tour Style of the Year	Won	
iHeartRadio Music Awards	2025	Favourite Tour Tradition (Surprise song)	Won	
iHeartRadio Music Awards	2025	Favourite Surprise Guest (Travis Kelce)	Won	
iHeartRadio Music Awards	2025	Tour of the Century	Won	
iHeartRadio Music Awards	2025	Favourite Tour Tradition (22 hat)	Nominated	
iHeartRadio Music Awards	2026	Favorite Tour Style	Won	
Nickelodeon Kids' Choice Awards	2024	Favorite Ticket of the Year	Won	
MTV MIAW Awards	2024	Event of the Year	Nominated	

== Impact ==
Taylor Swift keeps building the legend of her Eras Tour, week after week, city by city, making every night so much longer, wilder, louder, more jubilant than it has to be. There's nothing in history to compare. This is her best tour ever, by an absurd margin. It's a journey through her past, starring all the different Taylors she's ever been, which means all the Taylors that you've ever been.

— Rob Sheffield, Rolling Stone

The Eras Tour had a significant impact on the music industry, entertainment and beyond. It was described as one of the most prominent cultural phenomena of the 21st century, generating a level of attention similar to the 1960s' Beatlemania. The tour revitalized local businesses and tourism, attracted large crowds of spectators outside stadiums, dominated news cycles and social media, and inspired tributes from governments and organizations. Critics often described the Eras Tour as a monocultural event demonstrating Swift's impact on popular culture. The tour fueled an increase in public consumption of her discography as well. Swift's net worth, which was $740 million before the tour began, was updated to $1.1 billion after the first 57 shows of the tour, making Swift the first billionaire in history with music as the main source of income. Sportico reported that the NFL stadiums Swift performed at garnered substantial revenue from concessions and merchandise sales, and parking permits. A carbon footprint analysis by the climate consultancy Greenly estimated the tour's emissions, noting that merchandise was a notable contributor. By its calculations, if 25,000 attendees at each show bought a single T-shirt, the resulting emissions would amount to roughly 19,370 tonnes of CO2.

== Controversies ==
=== US ticket sales crash ===
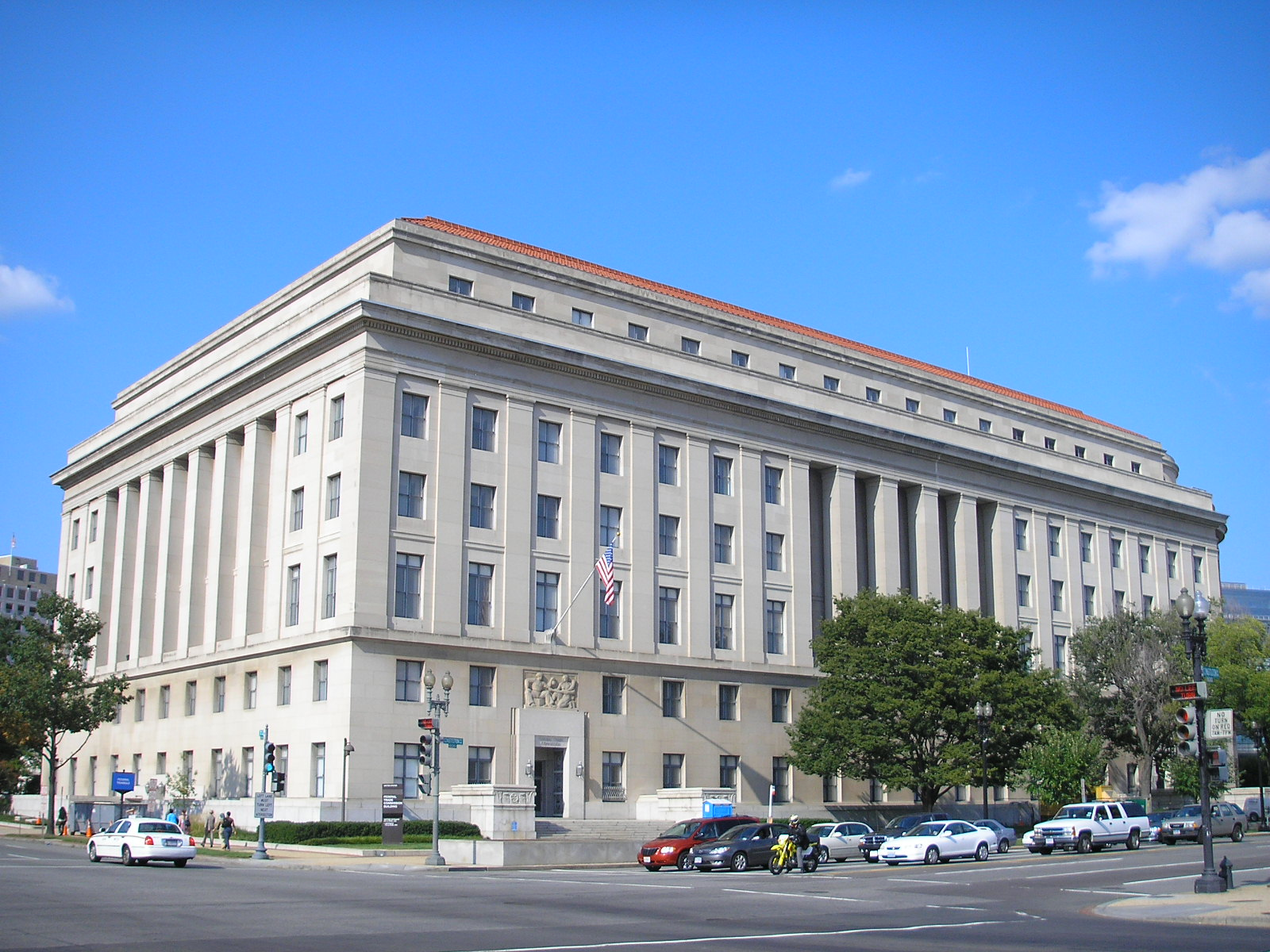
The US Federal Trade Commission proposed to outlaw junk fees in the country following the controversy.

On November 15, the day of the first US presale, Ticketmaster's website crashed following what Variety called "historically unprecedented demand". Live Nation, the parent company of Ticketmaster, said they prepared for 1.5 million verified fans, but 14 million turned up; published a statement saying they had been "unprepared" to accommodate them; and cancelled any further sales, citing inability to meet demand. The fiasco was the subject of public criticism and political scrutiny. Customers and fans criticized Ticketmaster for its allegedly flawed systems and inefficient technical resolutions. US lawmakers, including attorneys general and members of Congress, took notice of the issue, which became the focus of multiple state, federal and congressional inquiries, and an antitrust lawsuit.

=== Venue management in Brazil ===
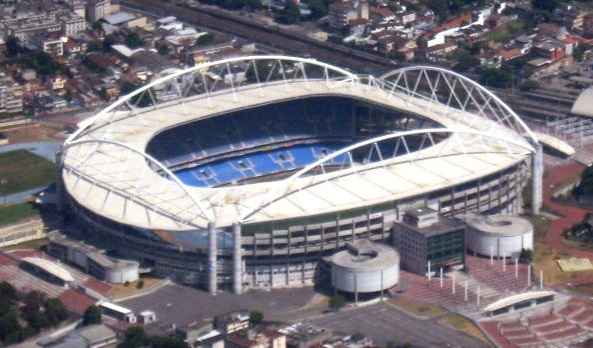
Estádio Olímpico Nilton Santos, where the incident took place

Unrest was reported on June 11, 2023, outside the Brazilian venues' box offices, as scalpers attempted to cut in line, including some armed scalpers who threatened violence, until the police intervened. The agency responsible for the tour in Brazil, T4F – Time For Fun (T4F), was reported over 100 times to authorities for their inaction. On June 20, federal lawmakers in Brazil filed the "Taylor Swift Law", which would penalize scalpers with up to four years in prison and a fine of up to 100 times the value of the ticket.

On November 17, 2023, before the start of the first Rio de Janeiro show, T4F reportedly prohibited concertgoers from bringing their own water bottles inside the venue. It was one of the hottest days in the city, with a heat index of 59.3 °C (138.74 °F), as part of a heat wave in the country. Videos posted to social media by fans showed thousands of queued concertgoers waiting for hours in the sun before entry into the stadium; Swift and her team arranged and distributed water bottles to the crowd. A concert attendee, Ana Clara Benevides, died while being taken to a hospital after she fainted during the first few minutes of the show. T4F attracted widespread criticism from fans and politicians. Several claimed that stadium organizers "refused" to provide concertgoers water; a criminal investigation was opened. Benevides' cause of death was forensically determined to be cardiac arrest caused by heat exhaustion. Swift grieved Benevides' death on social media. She postponed the show that had been scheduled for November 18 to 20, citing "extreme temperatures".

=== Diplomacy in Asia ===
Srettha Thavisin, then Prime Minister of Thailand, claimed that the government of Singapore offered subsidies of $2 million–$3 million per show of the Eras Tour in exchange for making Singapore the exclusive venue in Southeast Asia. He criticized Singapore for excluding other member countries of the ASEAN from witnessing Swift. The Singapore Tourism Board responded that they did provide a "grant" to bring the Eras Tour to Singapore, and that the Ministry of Culture, Community and Youth worked with the tour's promoter, Anschutz Entertainment Group (AEG), but did not reveal the size of the grant or attached conditions due to "business confidentiality". Minister Edwin Tong commented, the alleged sum of the grant was "nowhere as high as what is being speculated". Joey Salceda, member of the House of Representatives of the Philippines, criticized Singapore and demanded that the Philippine Department of Foreign Affairs seek an explanation from the Embassy of Singapore in Manila. Sandiaga Uno, Indonesian minister of Tourism and Creative Economy, also expressed his disappointment, stating "Indonesia was eager to replicate the success of Swiftonomics". Subsequently, Lee Hsien Loong, Prime Minister of Singapore since 2004, assured that the exclusivity grant did not have an hostile intention.

Swift included neither the People's Republic of China nor the Republic of China (Taiwan) in the Eras Tour. The tour skipping Taiwan was a topic of political debate during the campaigns preceding the 2024 Taiwanese presidential and legislative body elections. Jaw Shaw-kong, vice-presidential candidate of the opposition (Kuomintang party), claimed he invited Swift to perform at the Taipei Dome and that she initially agreed to perform but later declined due to "geopolitical risks" of the sensitive cross-strait relations. The Taiwanese Ministry of Culture commented on the issue but neither denied nor confirmed Jaw's claims. Kaohsiung mayor Chen Chi-mai described Jaw's claims about Swift as an attempt at manipulating the voters.

=== Security in Europe ===
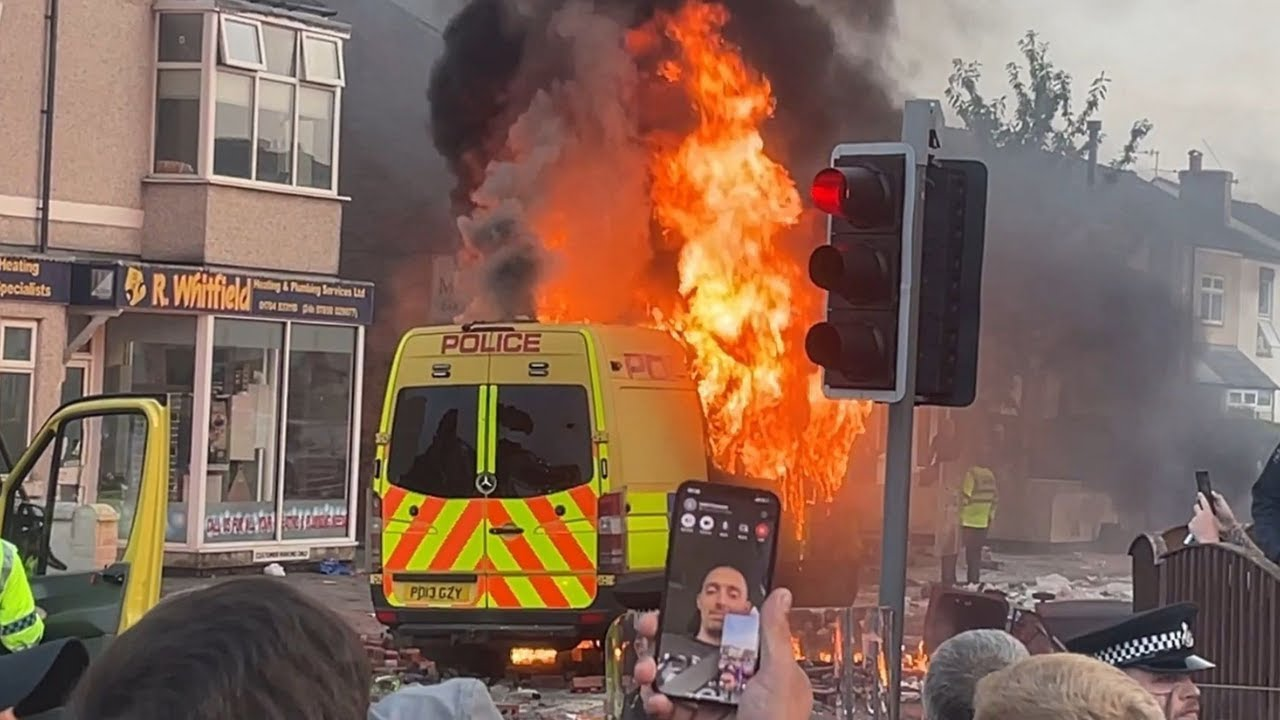
A police vehicle set afire by rioters following a fatal stabbing attack on children in a Swiftie workshop in Southport, United Kingdom

On July 18, 2024, a suspected stalker of Swift, who was accused of threatening her and her boyfriend, American football player Travis Kelce, on social media was detained and arrested as he attempted to enter the second of Swift's shows in Gelsenkirchen. The same month, three children were killed at a mass stabbing attack at a Swiftie workshop in Southport, Merseyside, UK. The incident caused public unrest in Southport, and over the next few days, escalated into nationwide protests and riots. A week later, authorities thwarted an Islamic State (ISIS) plot to attack Swift's three shows in Vienna. Police arrested three teenagers who were "radicalized on the Internet" and plotted to kill "tens of thousands" at the concerts. Initially, Austrian public security director Franz Ruf stated that the shows would take place as scheduled, with additional security measures in place. However, event organizer Barracuda Music announced that all three shows would be cancelled with tickets refunded, after confirmation from the Government of Austria of an elaborate terrorist plan. With Swift's permission, the Austrian public broadcaster ORF aired the tour's accompanying concert film on August 10 on ORF 1 television for free. The tour's next stop, London, increased its security for the shows.

In October 2024, controversy ensued in the UK when it was reported that politicians of the ruling Labour Party were gifted with over £20,000 in free tickets to the Eras Tour after Swift's demands for the highest level of security were denied, with the politicians allegedly pressuring the Metropolitan Police to give in to the demands. In advance of the London dates, Swift's team had reportedly demanded additional "VVIP" security from the Metropolitan Police's Special Escort Group and threatened to cancel the London shows if not provided. The police initially turned down the request, claiming their intelligence did not detect any threat to Swift's London shows and hence she did not require the top-level "taxpayer-funded" security reserved for heads of state. However, the police subsequently reversed its decision and provided Swift with the requested protection. Various politicians of the opposition Conservative Party, such as Susan Hall, Robert Jenrick, Gavin Williamson and Andrew Murrison, criticized the Labour government, accusing it of abuse of power. Both the police and the government denied the allegations of bribery; Starmer's spokesperson described it as a conflict of interest.

== Philanthropy ==
Swift donated to food bank units at every stop of the Eras Tour, as reported by the respective organizations, and exclusively employed various local businesses to fulfill her crew's daily requirements. At the conclusion of the first US leg, Swift gave "unprecedented" bonus payments totaling over $55 million to her entire touring crew, including $100,000 to each of the 50 truck drivers involved in transporting the stage setup and production equipment. By the end of the tour, Swift distributed $197 million in bonus payments to her crew. A spokesperson for Swift said she purchased more than double the carbon credits needed to offset emissions generated by her travel throughout the tour. In October 2023, Swift donated Eras Tour tickets to the Rare Impact Fund, a charity and mental health awareness initiative by the American singer Selena Gomez's cosmetic company, Rare Beauty. The auctioned tickets sold for $15,000 and were the "biggest ticket item of the event". On April 27, 2024, four Eras Tour tickets raised $80,000 at auction in a gala benefiting the 15 and The Mahomies Foundation, a charity by the American football player Patrick Mahomes.

== Standard set list ==
=== March 2023 to March 2024 ===
This set list was taken from the show in Glendale on March 17, 2023. It does not represent all shows throughout the tour.

Act I – Lover

1. "Miss Americana & the Heartbreak Prince"
2. "Cruel Summer"
3. "The Man"
4. "You Need to Calm Down"
5. "Lover"
6. "The Archer"

Act II – Fearless

7. "Fearless"
8. "You Belong with Me"
9. "Love Story"

Act III – Evermore

10. "'Tis the Damn Season"
11. "Willow"
12. "Marjorie"
13. "Champagne Problems"
14. "Tolerate It"

Act IV – Reputation

15. "...Ready for It?"
16. "Delicate"
17. "Don't Blame Me"
18. "Look What You Made Me Do"

Act V – Speak Now

19. "Enchanted"

Act VI – Red

20. "22"
21. "We Are Never Ever Getting Back Together"
22. "I Knew You Were Trouble"
23. "All Too Well (10 Minute Version)"

Act VII – Folklore

24. "Seven" (spoken interlude) / "Invisible String"
25. "Betty"
26. "The Last Great American Dynasty"
27. "August"
28. "Illicit Affairs"
29. "My Tears Ricochet"
30. "Cardigan"

Act VIII – 1989

31. "Style"
32. "Blank Space"
33. "Shake It Off"
34. "Wildest Dreams"
35. "Bad Blood"

Act IX – Acoustic set

36. Guitar surprise song
37. Piano surprise song

Act X – Midnights

38. "Lavender Haze"
39. "Anti-Hero"
40. "Midnight Rain"
41. "Vigilante Shit"
42. "Bejeweled"
43. "Mastermind"
44. "Karma"

==== Alterations ====
- "The 1" replaced "Invisible String" starting from the Arlington shows, except at the second Nashville show, where Swift performed "Invisible String" in honor of the bench at Centennial Park dedicated to her.
- "Nothing New" was added before "All Too Well (10 Minute Version)" at shows opened by Phoebe Bridgers, who performed the song with Swift.
- At the three East Rutherford shows, Swift performed the remix of "Karma" with Ice Spice.
- "Long Live" was added after "Enchanted" as part of the Speak Now act after the release of Speak Now (Taylor's Version), until May 2024.
- "No Body, No Crime" replaced "'Tis the Damn Season" at shows opened by Haim, who performed the song with Swift.

=== May to December 2024 ===
This set list was taken from the show in Nanterre on May 9, 2024. It does not represent all shows throughout the tour.

Act I – Lover

1. "Miss Americana & the Heartbreak Prince"
2. "Cruel Summer"
3. "The Man"
4. "You Need to Calm Down"
5. "Lover"

Act II – Fearless

6. "Fearless"
7. "You Belong with Me"
8. "Love Story"

Act III – Red

9. "22"
10. "We Are Never Ever Getting Back Together"
11. "I Knew You Were Trouble"
12. "All Too Well (10 Minute Version)"

Act IV – Speak Now

13. "Enchanted"

Act V – Reputation

14. "...Ready for It?"
15. "Delicate"
16. "Don't Blame Me"
17. "Look What You Made Me Do"

Act VI – Folklore & Evermore

18. "Cardigan"
19. "Betty"
20. "Champagne Problems"
21. "August"
22. "Illicit Affairs"
23. "My Tears Ricochet"
24. "Marjorie"
25. "Willow"

Act VII – 1989

26. "Style"
27. "Blank Space"
28. "Shake It Off"
29. "Wildest Dreams"
30. "Bad Blood"

Act VIII – The Tortured Poets Department

31. "But Daddy I Love Him" / "So High School"
32. "Who's Afraid of Little Old Me?"
33. "Down Bad"
34. "Fortnight"
35. "The Smallest Man Who Ever Lived"
36. "I Can Do It with a Broken Heart"

Act IX – Acoustic set

37. Guitar surprise song
38. Piano surprise song

Act X – Midnights

39. "Lavender Haze"
40. "Anti-Hero"
41. "Midnight Rain"
42. "Vigilante Shit"
43. "Bejeweled"
44. "Mastermind"
45. "Karma"

==== Alterations ====
- At the last London show and the three Miami shows, Swift performed "Florida!!!" with Florence Welch of Florence and the Machine before "Who's Afraid of Little Old Me?"

== Surprise songs ==
Swift performed two numbers from her discography, as either a standalone song or a mashup, at each show as "surprise songs" in the ninth act—the first on acoustic guitar and the second on piano. Over the course of the tour, Swift played every song in her discography, with the exception of "That's When", "Bye Bye Baby", "Girl at Home", "Ronan", "Forever Winter" and "Soon You'll Get Better".

=== 2023 ===
Date (2023)	City	Guitar surprise song	Piano surprise song
March 17	Glendale	"Mirrorball"	"Tim McGraw"
March 18	Glendale	"This Is Me Trying"	"State of Grace"
March 24	Las Vegas	"Our Song"	"Snow on the Beach"
March 25	Las Vegas	"Cowboy like Me" (with Marcus Mumford)	"White Horse"
March 31	Arlington	"Sad Beautiful Tragic"	"Ours"
April 1	Arlington	"Death by a Thousand Cuts"	"Clean"
April 2	Arlington	"Jump then Fall"	"The Lucky One"
April 13	Tampa	"Speak Now"	"Treacherous"
April 14	Tampa	"The Great War" (with Aaron Dessner)	"You're on Your Own, Kid"
April 15	Tampa	"Mean"	"Mad Woman" (with Aaron Dessner)
April 21	Houston	"Wonderland"	"You're Not Sorry"
April 22	Houston	"A Place in This World"	"Today Was a Fairytale"
April 23	Houston	"Begin Again"	"Cold as You"
April 28	Atlanta	"The Other Side of the Door"	"Coney Island"
April 29	Atlanta	"High Infidelity"	"Gorgeous"
April 30	Atlanta	"I Bet You Think About Me"	"How You Get the Girl"
May 5	Nashville	"Sparks Fly"	"Teardrops on My Guitar"
May 6	Nashville	"Out of the Woods"	"Fifteen"
May 7	Nashville	"Would've, Could've, Should've" (with Aaron Dessner)	"Mine"
May 12	Philadelphia	"Gold Rush"	"Come Back... Be Here"
May 13	Philadelphia	"Forever & Always"	"This Love"
May 14	Philadelphia	"Hey Stephen"	"The Best Day"
May 19	Foxborough	"Should've Said No"	"Better Man"
May 20	Foxborough	"Question...?"	"Invisible"
May 21	Foxborough	"I Think He Knows" and "Red"	—N/a (Note: Due to rain the night before, Swift's piano was broken. As a result, she performed both surprise songs on the guitar.)
May 26	East Rutherford	"Getaway Car" (with Jack Antonoff)	"Maroon"
May 27	East Rutherford	"Holy Ground"	"False God"
May 28	East Rutherford	"Welcome to New York"	"Clean"
June 2	Chicago	"I Wish You Would"	"The Lakes"
June 3	Chicago	"You All Over Me" (with Maren Morris)	"I Don't Wanna Live Forever"
June 4	Chicago	"Hits Different"	"The Moment I Knew"
June 9	Detroit	"Haunted"	"I Almost Do"
June 10	Detroit	"All You Had to Do Was Stay"	"Breathe"
June 16	Pittsburgh	"Mr. Perfectly Fine"	"The Last Time"
June 17	Pittsburgh	"The Story of Us"	"Seven" (with Aaron Dessner)
June 23	Minneapolis	"Paper Rings"	"If This Was a Movie"
June 24	Minneapolis	"Dear John"	"Daylight"
June 30	Cincinnati	"I'm Only Me When I'm with You"	"Evermore"
July 1	Cincinnati	"Ivy" (with Aaron Dessner)	"Call It What You Want"
July 7	Kansas City	"Never Grow Up"	"When Emma Falls in Love"
July 8	Kansas City	"Last Kiss"	"Dorothea"
July 14	Denver	"Picture to Burn"	"Timeless"
July 15	Denver	"Starlight"	"Back to December"
July 22	Seattle	"This Is Why We Can't Have Nice Things"	"Everything Has Changed"
July 23	Seattle	"Message in a Bottle"	"Tied Together with a Smile"
July 28	Santa Clara	"Right Where You Left Me" (with Aaron Dessner)	"Castles Crumbling"
July 29	Santa Clara	"Stay Stay Stay"	"All of the Girls You Loved Before"
August 3	Los Angeles	"I Can See You"	"Maroon"
August 4	Los Angeles	"Our Song"	"You Are in Love"
August 5	Los Angeles	"Death by a Thousand Cuts"	"You're on Your Own, Kid"
August 7	Los Angeles	"Dress"	"Exile"
August 8	Los Angeles	"I Know Places"	"King of My Heart"
August 9	Los Angeles	"New Romantics"	"New Year's Day"
August 24	Mexico City	"I Forgot That You Existed"	"Sweet Nothing"
August 25	Mexico City	"Tell Me Why"	"Snow on the Beach"
August 26	Mexico City	"Cornelia Street"	"You're on Your Own, Kid"
August 27	Mexico City	"Afterglow"	"Maroon"
November 9	Buenos Aires	"The Very First Night"	"Labyrinth"
November 11	Buenos Aires	"Is It Over Now?" / "Out of the Woods"	"End Game"
November 12	Buenos Aires	"Better than Revenge"	"'Slut!'"
November 17	Rio de Janeiro	"Stay Beautiful"	"Suburban Legends"
November 19	Rio de Janeiro	"Dancing With Our Hands Tied"	"Bigger Than the Whole Sky"
November 20	Rio de Janeiro	"Me!"	"So It Goes..."
November 24	São Paulo	"Now That We Don't Talk"	"Innocent"
November 25	São Paulo	"Safe & Sound"	"Untouchable"
November 26	São Paulo	"Say Don't Go"	"It's Time to Go"

=== 2024 ===
Date (2024)	City	Guitar surprise song	Piano surprise song
February 7	Tokyo	"Dear Reader"	"Holy Ground"
February 8	Tokyo	"Eyes Open"	"Electric Touch"
February 9	Tokyo	"Superman"	"The Outside"
February 10	Tokyo	"Come in with the Rain"	"You're on Your Own, Kid"
February 16	Melbourne	"Red"	"You're Losing Me"
February 17	Melbourne	"Getaway Car" / "August" / "The Other Side of the Door"	"This Is Me Trying"
February 18	Melbourne	"Come Back... Be Here" / "Daylight"	"Teardrops on My Guitar"
February 23	Sydney	"How You Get the Girl"	"White Horse" / "Coney Island" (with Sabrina Carpenter)
February 24	Sydney	"Should've Said No" / "You're Not Sorry"	"New Year's Day" / "Peace"
February 25	Sydney	"Is It Over Now?" / "I Wish You Would"	"Haunted" / "Exile"
February 26	Sydney	"Would've, Could've, Should've" / "Ivy"	"Forever & Always" / "Maroon"
March 2	Singapore	"Mine" / "Starlight"	"I Don't Wanna Live Forever" / "Dress"
March 3	Singapore	"Long Story Short" / "The Story of Us"	"Clean" / "Evermore"
March 4	Singapore	"Foolish One" / "Tell Me Why"	"This Love" / "Call It What You Want"
March 7	Singapore	"Death by a Thousand Cuts" / "Babe"	"Fifteen" / "You're on Your Own, Kid"
March 8	Singapore	"Sparks Fly" / "Gold Rush"	"False God" / "'Slut!'"
March 9	Singapore	"Tim McGraw" / "Cowboy like Me"	"Mirrorball" / "Epiphany"
May 9	Paris	"Paris"	"Loml"
May 10	Paris	"Is It Over Now?" / "Out of the Woods"	"My Boy Only Breaks His Favorite Toys"
May 11	Paris	"Hey Stephen"	"Maroon"
May 12	Paris	"The Alchemy" / "Treacherous"	"Begin Again" / "Paris"
May 17	Stockholm	"I Think He Knows" / "Gorgeous"	"Peter"
May 18	Stockholm	"Guilty as Sin?"	"Say Don't Go" / "Welcome to New York" / "Clean"
May 19	Stockholm	"Message in a Bottle" / "How You Get the Girl" / "New Romantics"	"How Did It End?"
May 24	Lisbon	"Come Back... Be Here" / "The Way I Loved You" / "The Other Side of the Door"	"Fresh Out the Slammer" / "High Infidelity"
May 25	Lisbon	"The Tortured Poets Department" / "Now That We Don't Talk"	"You're on Your Own, Kid" / "Long Live"
May 29	Madrid	"Sparks Fly" / "I Can Fix Him (No Really I Can)"	"I Look in People's Windows" / "Snow on the Beach"
May 30	Madrid	"Our Song" / "Jump then Fall"	"King of My Heart"
June 2	Lyon	"The Prophecy" / "Long Story Short"	"Fifteen" / "You're on Your Own, Kid"
June 3	Lyon	"Glitch" / "Everything Has Changed"	"Chloe or Sam or Sophia or Marcus"
June 7	Edinburgh	"Would've, Could've, Should've" / "I Know Places"	"'Tis the Damn Season" / "Daylight"
June 8	Edinburgh	"The Bolter" / "Getaway Car"	"All of the Girls You Loved Before" / "Crazier"
June 9	Edinburgh	"It's Nice to Have a Friend" / "Dorothea"	"Haunted" / "Exile"
June 13	Liverpool	"I Can See You" / "Mine"	"Cornelia Street" / "Maroon"
June 14	Liverpool	"This Is What You Came For" / "Gold Rush"	"The Great War" / "You're Losing Me"
June 15	Liverpool	"Carolina" / "No Body, No Crime"	"The Manuscript" / "Red"
June 18	Cardiff	"I Forgot That You Existed" / "This Is Why We Can't Have Nice Things"	"I Hate It Here" / "The Lakes"
June 21	London	"Hits Different" / "Death by a Thousand Cuts"	"The Black Dog" / "Come Back... Be Here" / "Maroon"
June 22	London	"Thank You Aimee" / "Mean"	"Castles Crumbling" (with Hayley Williams)
June 23	London	"Us" (with Gracie Abrams)	"Out of the Woods" / "Is It Over Now?" / "Clean"
June 28	Dublin	"State of Grace" / "You're on Your Own, Kid"	"Sweet Nothing" / "Hoax"
June 29	Dublin	"The Albatross" / "Dancing With Our Hands Tied"	"This Love" / "Ours"
June 30	Dublin	"Clara Bow" / "The Lucky One"	"You're on Your Own, Kid"
July 4	Amsterdam	"Guilty as Sin?" / "Untouchable"	"The Archer" / "Question...?"
July 5	Amsterdam	"Imgonnagetyouback" / "Dress"	"You Are in Love" / "Cowboy like Me"
July 6	Amsterdam	"Sweeter than Fiction" / "Holy Ground"	"Mary's Song (Oh My My My)" / "So High School" / "Everything Has Changed"
July 9	Zürich	"Right Where You Left Me" / "All You Had to Do Was Stay"	"Last Kiss" / "Sad Beautiful Tragic"
July 10	Zürich	"Closure" / "A Perfectly Good Heart"	"Robin" / "Never Grow Up"
July 13	Milan	"The 1" / "Wonderland"	"I Almost Do" / "The Moment I Knew"
July 14	Milan	"Mr. Perfectly Fine" / "Red"	"Getaway Car" / "Out of the Woods"
July 17	Gelsenkirchen	"Superstar" / "Invisible String"	"'Slut!'" / "False God"
July 18	Gelsenkirchen	"Speak Now" / "Hey Stephen"	"This Is Me Trying" / "Labyrinth"
July 19	Gelsenkirchen	"Paper Rings" / "Stay Stay Stay"	"It's Time to Go" / "Better Man"
July 23	Hamburg	"Teardrops on My Guitar" / "The Last Time"	"We Were Happy" / "Happiness"
July 24	Hamburg	"The Last Great American Dynasty" / "Run"	"Nothing New" / "Dear Reader"
July 27	Munich	"Fresh Out the Slammer" / "You Are in Love"	"Ivy" / "Call It What You Want"
July 28	Munich	"I Don't Wanna Live Forever" / "Imgonnagetyouback"	"Loml" / "Don't You"
August 1	Warsaw	"Mirrorball" / "Clara Bow"	"Suburban Legends" / "New Year's Day"
August 2	Warsaw	"I Can Fix Him (No Really I Can)" / "I Can See You"	"Red" / "Maroon"
August 3	Warsaw	"Today Was a Fairytale" / "I Think He Knows"	"The Black Dog" / "Exile"
August 15	London	"Everything Has Changed" / "End Game" / "Thinking Out Loud" (with Ed Sheeran)	"King of My Heart" / "The Alchemy"
August 16	London	"London Boy"	"Dear John" / "Sad Beautiful Tragic"
August 17	London	"I Did Something Bad"	"My Boy Only Breaks His Favorite Toys" / "Coney Island"
August 19	London	"Long Live" / "Change"	"The Archer" / "You're on Your Own, Kid"
August 20	London	"Death by a Thousand Cuts" / "Getaway Car" (with Jack Antonoff)	"So Long, London"
October 18	Miami	"Tim McGraw" / "Timeless"	"This Is Me Trying" / "Daylight"
October 19	Miami	"Should've Said No" / "I Did Something Bad"	"Loml" / "White Horse"
October 20	Miami	"Out of the Woods" / "All You Had to Do Was Stay"	"Mirrorball" / "Guilty as Sin?"
October 25	New Orleans	"Our Song" / "Call It What You Want"	"The Black Dog" / "Haunted"
October 26	New Orleans	"Espresso" / "Is It Over Now?" / "Please Please Please" (with Sabrina Carpenter)	"Hits Different" / "Welcome to New York"
October 27	New Orleans	"Afterglow" / "Dress"	"How You Get the Girl" / "Clean"
November 1	Indianapolis	"The Albatross" / "Holy Ground"	"Cold as You" / "Exile"
November 2	Indianapolis	"The Prophecy" / "This Love"	"Maroon" / "Cowboy like Me"
November 3	Indianapolis	"Cornelia Street" / "The Bolter"	"Death by a Thousand Cuts" / "The Great War"
November 14	Toronto	"My Boy Only Breaks His Favorite Toys" / "This Is Why We Can't Have Nice Things"	"False God" / "'Tis the Damn Season"
November 15	Toronto	"I Don't Wanna Live Forever" / "Mine"	"Evermore" / "Peter"
November 16	Toronto	"Us" / "Out of the Woods" (with Gracie Abrams)	"You're on Your Own, Kid" / "Long Story Short"
November 21	Toronto	"Mr. Perfectly Fine" / "Better than Revenge"	"State of Grace" / "Labyrinth"
November 22	Toronto	"Ours" / "The Last Great American Dynasty"	"Cassandra" / "Mad Woman" / "I Did Something Bad"
November 23	Toronto	"Sparks Fly" / "Message in a Bottle"	"You're Losing Me" / "How Did It End?"
December 6	Vancouver	"Haunted" / "Wonderland"	"Never Grow Up" / "The Best Day"
December 7	Vancouver	"I Love You, I'm Sorry" / "Last Kiss" (with Gracie Abrams)	"The Tortured Poets Department" / "Maroon"
December 8	Vancouver	"A Place in This World" / "New Romantics"	"Long Live" / "New Year's Day" / "The Manuscript"

=== Notes ===
- At the third Tampa show and the second Pittsburgh show, Swift reversed the order of the instruments she used to perform the surprise songs, playing the first on piano with Aaron Dessner and the second on acoustic guitar.
- At the third Foxborough show, Swift performed both surprise songs on acoustic guitar due to technical difficulties with the piano caused by the previous night's rain.
- At the second Cincinnati show, Swift performed "I Miss You, I'm Sorry" on acoustic guitar with Gracie Abrams on piano between the first and second surprise songs.

== Tour dates ==
2023 shows
Date (2023)	City	Country	Venue	Opening act(s)	Attendance
March 17	Glendale	United States	State Farm Stadium	Paramore; Gayle	140,000 / 140,000
March 18	Glendale	United States	State Farm Stadium	Paramore; Gayle	140,000 / 140,000
March 24	Paradise (Note: Labeled as Las Vegas in promotional material)	United States	Allegiant Stadium	Beabadoobee; Gayle	—N/a
March 25	Paradise	United States	Allegiant Stadium	Beabadoobee; Gayle	—N/a
March 31	Arlington	United States	AT&T Stadium	Muna; Gayle	210,607 / 210,607
April 1	Arlington	United States	AT&T Stadium	Beabadoobee; Gracie Abrams	210,607 / 210,607
April 2	Arlington	United States	AT&T Stadium	Beabadoobee; Gracie Abrams	210,607 / 210,607
April 13	Tampa	United States	Raymond James Stadium	Beabadoobee; Gayle	206,459 / 206,459
April 14	Tampa	United States	Raymond James Stadium	Beabadoobee; Gracie Abrams	206,459 / 206,459
April 15	Tampa	United States	Raymond James Stadium	Beabadoobee; Gracie Abrams	206,459 / 206,459
April 21	Houston	United States	NRG Stadium	Beabadoobee; Gracie Abrams	216,660 / 216,660
April 22	Houston	United States	NRG Stadium	Beabadoobee; Gracie Abrams	216,660 / 216,660
April 23	Houston	United States	NRG Stadium	Beabadoobee; Gracie Abrams	216,660 / 216,660
April 28	Atlanta	United States	Mercedes-Benz Stadium	Beabadoobee; Gracie Abrams	210,000 / 210,000
April 29	Atlanta	United States	Mercedes-Benz Stadium	Beabadoobee; Gracie Abrams	210,000 / 210,000
April 30	Atlanta	United States	Mercedes-Benz Stadium	Muna; Gayle	210,000 / 210,000
May 5	Nashville	United States	Nissan Stadium	Phoebe Bridgers; Gracie Abrams	213,000 / 213,000 (Note: Rough estimate based on the third night's record attendance.)
May 6	Nashville	United States	Nissan Stadium	Phoebe Bridgers; Gayle	213,000 / 213,000
May 7	Nashville	United States	Nissan Stadium	—N/a (Note: The scheduled opening acts were Phoebe Bridgers and Gracie Abrams; however, due to delays caused by heavy thunderstorms, both sets were cancelled.)	213,000 / 213,000
May 12	Philadelphia	United States	Lincoln Financial Field	Phoebe Bridgers; Gayle	202,700 / 202,700
May 13	Philadelphia	United States	Lincoln Financial Field	Phoebe Bridgers; Gayle	202,700 / 202,700
May 14	Philadelphia	United States	Lincoln Financial Field	Phoebe Bridgers; Gracie Abrams	202,700 / 202,700
May 19	Foxborough	United States	Gillette Stadium	Phoebe Bridgers; Gayle	200,000 / 200,000
May 20	Foxborough	United States	Gillette Stadium	Phoebe Bridgers; Gayle	200,000 / 200,000
May 21	Foxborough	United States	Gillette Stadium	Phoebe Bridgers; Gracie Abrams	200,000 / 200,000
May 26	East Rutherford	United States	MetLife Stadium	Phoebe Bridgers; Gayle	217,635 / 217,635
May 27	East Rutherford	United States	MetLife Stadium	Phoebe Bridgers; Gracie Abrams	217,635 / 217,635
May 28	East Rutherford	United States	MetLife Stadium	Phoebe Bridgers; Owenn	217,635 / 217,635
June 2	Chicago	United States	Soldier Field	Girl in Red; Owenn	150,000 / 150,000 (Note: Rough estimate based on the first night's attendance.)
June 3	Chicago	United States	Soldier Field	Girl in Red; Owenn	150,000 / 150,000
June 4	Chicago	United States	Soldier Field	Muna; Gracie Abrams	150,000 / 150,000
June 9	Detroit	United States	Ford Field	Girl in Red; Gracie Abrams	118,661 / 118,661
June 10	Detroit	United States	Ford Field	Girl in Red; Owenn	118,661 / 118,661
June 16	Pittsburgh	United States	Acrisure Stadium	Girl in Red; Gracie Abrams	146,234 / 146,234 (Note: Rough estimate based on the second night's record attendance.)
June 17	Pittsburgh	United States	Acrisure Stadium	Girl in Red; Owenn	146,234 / 146,234
June 23	Minneapolis	United States	U.S. Bank Stadium	Girl in Red; Gracie Abrams	128,906 / 128,906
June 24	Minneapolis	United States	U.S. Bank Stadium	Girl in Red; Owenn	128,906 / 128,906
June 30	Cincinnati	United States	Paycor Stadium	Muna; Gracie Abrams	130,000 / 130,000
July 1	Cincinnati	United States	Paycor Stadium	Muna (Note: The scheduled opening acts were Muna and Gracie Abrams; however, due to forecasts of heavy thunderstorms, Abrams' set was cancelled.)	130,000 / 130,000
July 7	Kansas City	United States	GEHA Field at Arrowhead Stadium	Muna; Gracie Abrams	110,000 / 110,000
July 8	Kansas City	United States	GEHA Field at Arrowhead Stadium	Muna; Gracie Abrams	110,000 / 110,000
July 14	Denver	United States	Empower Field at Mile High	Muna; Gracie Abrams	150,000 / 150,000
July 15	Denver	United States	Empower Field at Mile High	Muna; Gracie Abrams	150,000 / 150,000
July 22	Seattle	United States	Lumen Field	Haim; Gracie Abrams	144,342 / 144,342 (Note: Rough estimate based on the first night's record attendance.)
July 23	Seattle	United States	Lumen Field	Haim; Gracie Abrams	144,342 / 144,342
July 28	Santa Clara	United States	Levi's Stadium	Haim; Gracie Abrams	140,000 / 140,000
July 29	Santa Clara	United States	Levi's Stadium	Haim; Gracie Abrams	140,000 / 140,000
August 3	Inglewood (Note: Labeled as Los Angeles in promotional material)	United States	SoFi Stadium	Haim; Gracie Abrams	420,000 / 420,000
August 4	Inglewood	United States	SoFi Stadium	Haim; Owenn	420,000 / 420,000
August 5	Inglewood	United States	SoFi Stadium	Haim; Gayle	420,000 / 420,000
August 7	Inglewood	United States	SoFi Stadium	Haim; Gracie Abrams	420,000 / 420,000
August 8	Inglewood	United States	SoFi Stadium	Haim; Gracie Abrams	420,000 / 420,000
August 9	Inglewood	United States	SoFi Stadium	Haim; Gayle	420,000 / 420,000
August 24	Mexico City	Mexico	Foro Sol	Sabrina Carpenter	180,000 / 180,000
August 25	Mexico City	Mexico	Foro Sol	Sabrina Carpenter	180,000 / 180,000
August 26	Mexico City	Mexico	Foro Sol	Sabrina Carpenter	180,000 / 180,000
August 27	Mexico City	Mexico	Foro Sol	Sabrina Carpenter	180,000 / 180,000
November 9	Buenos Aires	Argentina	Estadio River Plate	Sabrina Carpenter; Louta	220,000 / 220,000
November 11	Buenos Aires	Argentina	Estadio River Plate	Sabrina Carpenter; Louta	220,000 / 220,000
November 12 (Note: The show on November 12, 2023, in Buenos Aires was originally scheduled for November 10, but was postponed due to heavy thunderstorms.)	Buenos Aires	Argentina	Estadio River Plate	Sabrina Carpenter; Louta	220,000 / 220,000
November 17	Rio de Janeiro	Brazil	Estádio Olímpico Nilton Santos	Sabrina Carpenter	180,000 / 180,000 (Note: Rough estimate based on the first night's record attendance.)
November 19	Rio de Janeiro	Brazil	Estádio Olímpico Nilton Santos	Sabrina Carpenter	180,000 / 180,000
November 20 (Note: The show on November 20, 2023, in Rio de Janeiro was originally scheduled for November 18, but was postponed due to extreme heat and the death of Ana Clara Benevides.)	Rio de Janeiro	Brazil	Estádio Olímpico Nilton Santos	Sabrina Carpenter	180,000 / 180,000
November 24	São Paulo	Brazil	Allianz Parque	Sabrina Carpenter	150,000 / 150,000
November 25	São Paulo	Brazil	Allianz Parque	Sabrina Carpenter	150,000 / 150,000
November 26	São Paulo	Brazil	Allianz Parque	Sabrina Carpenter	150,000 / 150,000

2024 shows
Date (2024)	City	Country	Venue	Opening act(s)	Attendance
February 7	Tokyo	Japan	Tokyo Dome	—N/a	220,000 / 220,000
February 8	Tokyo	Japan	Tokyo Dome	—N/a	220,000 / 220,000
February 9	Tokyo	Japan	Tokyo Dome	—N/a	220,000 / 220,000
February 10	Tokyo	Japan	Tokyo Dome	—N/a	220,000 / 220,000
February 16	Melbourne	Australia	Melbourne Cricket Ground	Sabrina Carpenter	288,000 / 288,000
February 17	Melbourne	Australia	Melbourne Cricket Ground	Sabrina Carpenter	288,000 / 288,000
February 18	Melbourne	Australia	Melbourne Cricket Ground	Sabrina Carpenter	288,000 / 288,000
February 23	Sydney	Australia	Accor Stadium	—N/a (Note: The scheduled opening act was Sabrina Carpenter; however, due to delays caused by thunderstorms, the set was cancelled, but she later came on during the surprise songs to perform with Taylor.)	320,000 / 320,000 (Note: Rough estimate based on the fourth night's record attendance.)
February 24	Sydney	Australia	Accor Stadium	Sabrina Carpenter	320,000 / 320,000
February 25	Sydney	Australia	Accor Stadium	Sabrina Carpenter	320,000 / 320,000
February 26	Sydney	Australia	Accor Stadium	Sabrina Carpenter	320,000 / 320,000
March 2	Singapore		Singapore National Stadium	Sabrina Carpenter	378,000 / 378,000 (Note: Rough estimate based on the sixth night's record attendance.)
March 3	Singapore		Singapore National Stadium	Sabrina Carpenter	378,000 / 378,000
March 4	Singapore		Singapore National Stadium	Sabrina Carpenter	378,000 / 378,000
March 7	Singapore		Singapore National Stadium	Sabrina Carpenter	378,000 / 378,000
March 8	Singapore		Singapore National Stadium	Sabrina Carpenter	378,000 / 378,000
March 9	Singapore		Singapore National Stadium	Sabrina Carpenter	378,000 / 378,000
May 9	Nanterre	France	Paris La Défense Arena	Paramore	180,000 / 180,000
May 10	Nanterre	France	Paris La Défense Arena	Paramore	180,000 / 180,000
May 11	Nanterre	France	Paris La Défense Arena	Paramore	180,000 / 180,000
May 12	Nanterre	France	Paris La Défense Arena	Paramore	180,000 / 180,000
May 17	Stockholm	Sweden	Friends Arena	Paramore	178,679 / 178,679
May 18	Stockholm	Sweden	Friends Arena	Paramore	178,679 / 178,679
May 19	Stockholm	Sweden	Friends Arena	Paramore	178,679 / 178,679
May 24	Lisbon	Portugal	Estádio da Luz	Paramore	120,000 / 120,000
May 25	Lisbon	Portugal	Estádio da Luz	Paramore	120,000 / 120,000
May 29	Madrid	Spain	Estadio Santiago Bernabéu	Paramore	130,000 / 130,000
May 30	Madrid	Spain	Estadio Santiago Bernabéu	Paramore	130,000 / 130,000
June 2	Décines-Charpieu (Note: Labeled as Lyon in promotional material)	France	Groupama Stadium	Paramore	122,000 / 122,000 (Note: Rough estimate based on the second night's record attendance.)
June 3	Décines-Charpieu	France	Groupama Stadium	Paramore	122,000 / 122,000
June 7	Edinburgh	Scotland	Murrayfield Stadium	Paramore	219,000 / 219,000
June 8	Edinburgh	Scotland	Murrayfield Stadium	Paramore	219,000 / 219,000
June 9	Edinburgh	Scotland	Murrayfield Stadium	Paramore	219,000 / 219,000
June 13	Liverpool	England	Anfield	Paramore	186,000 / 186,000 (Note: Rough estimate based on the first night's record attendance.)
June 14	Liverpool	England	Anfield	Paramore	186,000 / 186,000
June 15	Liverpool	England	Anfield	Paramore	186,000 / 186,000
June 18	Cardiff	Wales	Principality Stadium	Paramore	70,000 / 70,000
June 21	London	England	Wembley Stadium	Paramore; Mette	753,112 / 753,112 (Note: Attendance from the eight nights combined.)
June 22	London	England	Wembley Stadium	Paramore; Griff	753,112 / 753,112
June 23	London	England	Wembley Stadium	Paramore; Benson Boone	753,112 / 753,112
June 28	Dublin	Ireland	Aviva Stadium	Paramore	150,000 / 150,000
June 29	Dublin	Ireland	Aviva Stadium	Paramore	150,000 / 150,000
June 30	Dublin	Ireland	Aviva Stadium	Paramore	150,000 / 150,000
July 4	Amsterdam	Netherlands	Johan Cruyff Arena	Paramore	165,000 / 165,000
July 5	Amsterdam	Netherlands	Johan Cruyff Arena	Paramore	165,000 / 165,000
July 6	Amsterdam	Netherlands	Johan Cruyff Arena	Paramore	165,000 / 165,000
July 9	Zurich	Switzerland	Letzigrund	Paramore	95,000 / 95,000
July 10	Zurich	Switzerland	Letzigrund	Paramore	95,000 / 95,000
July 13	Milan	Italy	San Siro	Paramore	160,000 / 160,000
July 14	Milan	Italy	San Siro	Paramore	160,000 / 160,000
July 17	Gelsenkirchen	Germany	Veltins-Arena	Paramore	180,000 / 180,000
July 18	Gelsenkirchen	Germany	Veltins-Arena	Paramore	180,000 / 180,000
July 19	Gelsenkirchen	Germany	Veltins-Arena	Paramore	180,000 / 180,000
July 23	Hamburg	Germany	Volksparkstadion	Paramore	100,000 / 100,000
July 24	Hamburg	Germany	Volksparkstadion	Paramore	100,000 / 100,000
July 27	Munich	Germany	Olympiastadion	Paramore	148,000 / 148,000
July 28	Munich	Germany	Olympiastadion	Paramore	148,000 / 148,000
August 1	Warsaw	Poland	PGE Narodowy	Paramore	195,000 / 195,000 (Note: Rough estimate based on the first night's attendance.)
August 2	Warsaw	Poland	PGE Narodowy	Paramore	195,000 / 195,000
August 3	Warsaw	Poland	PGE Narodowy	Paramore	195,000 / 195,000
August 15	London	England	Wembley Stadium	Paramore; Sofia Isella	753,112 / 753,112
August 16	London	England	Wembley Stadium	Paramore; Holly Humberstone	753,112 / 753,112
August 17	London	England	Wembley Stadium	Paramore; Suki Waterhouse	753,112 / 753,112
August 19	London	England	Wembley Stadium	Paramore; Maisie Peters	753,112 / 753,112
August 20	London	England	Wembley Stadium	Paramore; Raye	753,112 / 753,112
October 18	Miami Gardens (Note: Labeled as Miami in promotional material)	United States	Hard Rock Stadium	Gracie Abrams	183,000 / 183,000
October 19	Miami Gardens	United States	Hard Rock Stadium	Gracie Abrams	183,000 / 183,000
October 20	Miami Gardens	United States	Hard Rock Stadium	Gracie Abrams	183,000 / 183,000
October 25	New Orleans	United States	Caesars Superdome	Gracie Abrams	195,000 / 195,000
October 26	New Orleans	United States	Caesars Superdome	Gracie Abrams	195,000 / 195,000
October 27	New Orleans	United States	Caesars Superdome	Gracie Abrams	195,000 / 195,000
November 1	Indianapolis	United States	Lucas Oil Stadium	Gracie Abrams	207,000 / 207,000
November 2	Indianapolis	United States	Lucas Oil Stadium	Gracie Abrams	207,000 / 207,000
November 3	Indianapolis	United States	Lucas Oil Stadium	Gracie Abrams	207,000 / 207,000
November 14	Toronto	Canada	Rogers Centre	Gracie Abrams	—N/a
November 15	Toronto	Canada	Rogers Centre	Gracie Abrams	—N/a
November 16	Toronto	Canada	Rogers Centre	Gracie Abrams	—N/a
November 21	Toronto	Canada	Rogers Centre	Gracie Abrams	—N/a
November 22	Toronto	Canada	Rogers Centre	Gracie Abrams	—N/a
November 23	Toronto	Canada	Rogers Centre	Gracie Abrams	—N/a
December 6	Vancouver	Canada	BC Place	Gracie Abrams	160,000 / 160,000
December 7	Vancouver	Canada	BC Place	Gracie Abrams	160,000 / 160,000
December 8	Vancouver	Canada	BC Place	Gracie Abrams	160,000 / 160,000
Total					10,168,008 / 10,168,008 (100%)

=== Cancelled shows ===
List of cancelled concerts
Date (2024)	City	Country	Venue	Reason	Ref.
August 8	Vienna	Austria	Ernst-Happel-Stadion	Terrorism plot	
August 9	Vienna	Austria	Ernst-Happel-Stadion	Terrorism plot	
August 10	Vienna	Austria	Ernst-Happel-Stadion	Terrorism plot	

== Personnel ==
Adapted from the credits of Taylor Swift: The Eras Tour concert film.

- Taylor Swift – lead vocals, guitar, piano

Band & Vocalists

- Mike Meadows – co-band leader, guitar, keyboards, cello, harmonica, mandolin, background vocals
- Max Bernstein – co-band leader, guitar, keyboards, pedal steel
- Paul Sidoti – guitar
- Amos Heller – bass, keyboard bass
- Matthew Billingslea – drums
- Karina DePiano – keyboards
- Melanie Nyema – background vocalist section leader
- Kamilah Marshall – background vocalist dance captain
- Jeslyn Gorman – background vocals (except shows in Seattle, Latin America, Tokyo, and Melbourne due to breast cancer diagnosis)
- Eliotte Woodford – background vocals (except shows in Hamburg, Munich, Warsaw, London nights 4-8, Miami, New Orleans, Indianapolis, and Toronto night 1)

Dancers

- Amanda Balen – dance captain
- Tori Evans
- Audrey Douglass
- Jan Ravnik
- Taylor Banks
- Megan Mead
- Sydney Moss
- Natalie Lecznar
- Whyley Yoshimura
- Raphael Thomas
- Kevin Scheitzbach
- Kameron Saunders
- Natalie Peterson
- Tamiya Lewis
- Cailyn Mahaffey
- Sam McWilliams
- Karen Chuang

== See also ==
- Impact of the COVID-19 pandemic on the music industry
- List of highest-grossing concert tours by women
- List of most-attended concert tours
- List of most-attended concert series at a single venue

== Footnotes ==
Cities

Others
