= Midnight Rain =

2022 song by Taylor Swift

Song by Taylor Swift

from the album Midnights
- Released: October 21, 2022
- Studio: Rough Customer (Brooklyn); Electric Lady (New York)
- Genre: Electropop
- Length: 2:54
- Label: Republic
- Songwriters: Taylor Swift; Jack Antonoff
- Producers: Taylor Swift; Jack Antonoff

Lyric video
- "Midnight Rain" on YouTube

"Midnight Rain" is a song by the American singer-songwriter Taylor Swift from her tenth studio album, Midnights (2022). She wrote and produced the track with Jack Antonoff. An electropop track, "Midnight Rain" features elements of R&B, hip-hop, and indietronica. Its production incorporates a drone generated by a Moog synthesizer, programmed hi-hats and synths, a deep bass, and a pitched-down vocal hook. In the lyrics, Swift's narrator contemplates on a lost love back in her hometown: although the ex-lover wanted a comfortable domestic life, she chose to pursue her career and fame.

Several critics who picked "Midnight Rain" as a highlight on Midnights deemed its production and vocal manipulation interesting and captivating. A few reviews found the vocal production otherwise off-putting or derivative. "Midnight Rain" peaked at number five on both the Billboard Hot 100 and Global 200, and it reached the top 10 on charts in Australia, Canada, India, Malaysia, the Philippines, Portugal, Singapore, and Vietnam. The song received platinum certifications in Australia, Brazil, Canada, and New Zealand. Swift included the song on the set list of the Eras Tour (2023–2024).

== Background and release ==
Taylor Swift conceived her tenth studio album, Midnights, as a collection of songs about inspired by her sleepless nights, detailing emotions like regret, lust, nostalgia, and self-loathing. She produced the album's standard edition with Jack Antonoff. Its track listing was revealed via a thirteen-episode video series called Midnights Mayhem with Me on the platform TikTok, where each video contained the title of one track at a time. The title of "Midnight Rain" was revealed in the episode posted on September 28, 2022. Republic Records released Midnights on October 21, 2022; "Midnight Rain" is sixth on the standard album's track listing.

"Midnight Rain" debuted and peaked at number five on the Billboard Global 200; the track and four other Midnights songs made Swift the first artist to chart the entire top five the same week. In the United States, the track debuted and peaked at number five on the Billboard Hot 100. It was one of the Midnights tracks that made Swift the first artist to occupy the top 10 of the Hot 100 the same week and the woman with the most top 10 entries (40), exceeding Madonna (38). It reached the top five of charts in Australia, Canada, the Philippines, Malaysia, and Singapore; top 10 Vietnam and Portugal; and the 20 in South Africa and in Iceland. The track was certified gold in Spain and the United Kingdom, platinum in Brazil and Canada, and double platinum in Australia.

== Lyrics and interpretations ==
In the lyrics, Swift's narrator contemplates on a lost love back in her hometown and how she chose her career and fame over a domestic life. It does not follow linear storytelling and instead recalls the past through fragments of memories. In the verses, the narrator reflects on how her hometown was a "wasteland" full of pretentious people and ruminates on the possibilities of the domestic life she "gave away". The refrain goes: "He wanted it comfortable/ I wanted that pain/ He wanted a bride/ I was making my own name." She reflects how the ex-boyfriend "stays the same" and she was "chasing that fame": "All of me changed like midnight rain." Towards the conclusion, the narrator reflects on this past with regret, "I guess sometimes we all get some kind of haunted/ And I never think of him except on midnights like this." Some critics consider "Midnight Rain" the album's emotional centerpiece. (Note: Attributed to Ryan, Pitchfork's Quinn Moreland, Variety's Chris Willman, and Parade's Samuel R. Murrian) Elise Ryan of the Associated Press deemed it the thesis statement of the "13 sleepless nights" that Swift designated for Midnights.

There were interpretations that related "Midnight Rain" to Swift's previous songs. According to The A.V. Club's Saloni Gajjar and Vox's Rebecca Jennings, the theme of leaving a small-town lover behind resembles many of the tracks of Swift's 2020 album Evermore, such as "Champagne Problems", "'Tis the Damn Season", and "Dorothea". Maura Johnston, in her review for The Boston Globe, argued that while the track employs a "diaristic" songwriting that had been familiar in Swift's works, it also hints at some elements that are not necessarily so, particularly in the refrain that sees Swift exploring her past and its murky memories.

Some analyses factored in the influence of Swift's fame. For Esquire's Alan Light, her songwriting embodies the narrative-based approach that she used in her 2020 albums Evermore and Folklore. He wrote that the track demonstrates her mature perspective on her own career path, "the determination, ambition, and sacrifices that got her to such rarefied altitude". In The New York Times, Lindsay Zoladz contended that the track represented Swift's shifted attitude towards romance: whereas her 2008 single "Love Story" depicted marriage as the ideal romantic ending with starry-eyed fairy tale imagery, "Midnight Rain" expresses ambivalence towards not only marriage but also the societal expectations and "traditional timelines of adulthood". Writing for the Alternative Press, Ilana Kaplan considered "Midnight Rain" one of the album tracks where Swift grappled with the "good-girl" image that she had constrained herself to, a notion that she had explained in the 2019 documentary Miss Americana.

== Production and music ==
"Midnight Rain"
Driven by a Moog synthesizer, "Midnight Rain" features trap, house, and R&B influences in its beats and production. This sample displays Swift's pitched-down vocals in the final refrain.

At 2 minutes and 54 seconds long, "Midnight Rain" has a sparse production. The track begins with Swift's vocals that are manipulated to an octave lower, resulting in a masculine-sounding pitch; this vocal part constitutes the song's hook. To achieve this sound, Antonoff modulated her singing voice using synth plugins including Soundtoys and iZotope Vocalsynth; he said that it was the first time he used such devices in music production.

Set over a tempo of 70 beats per minute, the track incorporates a programming of hi-hats that alternate between triplets and sixteenth notes, and bright tones of a Juno-6 synthesizer in contrast with the drone created by a distorted Moog synthesizer. The arrangement is occasionally accentuated with reversed sounds. Critics described the atmosphere and pacing of "Midnight Rain" as slow-burning and "woozy". The overall sound is electropop with elements of R&B, electronica, hip-hop, and electro-hip-hop. The bass displays influences of dubstep, and its beats feature elements of house, trap, and indie pop.

Music critics discussed the significance of the vocal manipulation. Mackenzie Wadsworth of the Tallahassee Democrat considered it a "mature sister" to the styles of Swift's 2017 album Reputation, bringing forth an alternative pop feel. According to the musicologist Phoebe E. Hughes, the vocal shifts between masculine- and feminine-sounding act as a narrative technique, representing the subject's perspective and the narrator's accounts. This idea was shared by Billboard's Jason Lipshutz, who described the shift between Swift's pitched-down voice and normal singing as a call and response.

Several reviews compared the production, particularly the vocal parts, to Antonoff's work on Lorde's 2017 album Melodrama. (Note: Attributed to the Associated Press' Elise Ryan, Universal Music NZ's Chantal Dalebroux, and Spin's Bobby Olivier) According to Ellen Johnson of Paste, the vocal effect aligns "Midnight Rain" with the subgenre indietronica, and the beats evoke the styles of Strfkr. Rob Sheffield of Rolling Stone said that the "butch/femme duet" where Swift experiments with her singing was akin to the styles of Prince, while Jon Caramanica of The New York Times wrote that the "overcast mood" of the production and vocals was influenced by Drake and the Weeknd.

== Critical reception ==
Several critics who picked "Midnight Rain" as a highlight on Midnights considered its production experimental, interesting, and captivating. Spencer Kornhaber of The Atlantic appreciated how the "oozing and panning noises" evoke a "feeling of suspended time". Wadsworth considered the sound an amalgamation of Swift's past styles, and Craig Jenkins from Vulture deemed it one of the R&B-tinged album tracks that showcased her abilities to create "a mannered genre reset constantly threatening to cut in an alluring new direction". Commenting on the vocal modulation, Spin's Bobby Olivier regarded it as "well executed, [...] landing an uncharacteristically soulful smolder". Lipshutz ranked "Midnight Rain" fifth on his ranking of all 13 Midnights tracks; he described the shifted-vocal hook as "rock-solid", giving Swift's real singing voice more clarity and power in the final refrain. Some critics were also fond of the storytelling lyrics. The Times' Will Hodgkinson regarded "Midnight Rain" as an album track that summarized Swift's midnight paranoia to "extreme heights", and Ryan particularly highlighted the refrain for displaying Swift's talents of writing lyrics that evoke universal emotions.

There were not as welcoming comments regarding the vocal effects. Spin's Al Shipley said that they sounded "like an embarrassing relic of 2010s SoundCloud production trends". Paul Attard from Slant Magazine felt that they were burdened by excessive reverb and turned out redundant, and Mary Siroky from Consequence said that they were overwhelming and distracting. NPR's Ann Powers appreciated how the shifts between Swift's modulated and real vocals symbolized the storytelling perspectives of the subject and the narrator, but she contended that this production style somewhat diminished the impact of Swift's songwriting. Mark Richardson of The Wall Street Journal deemed "Midnight Rain" a solid song that displayed a high level of songcraft, but he commented that it was "unexceptional" and not groundbreaking.

== Live performances ==
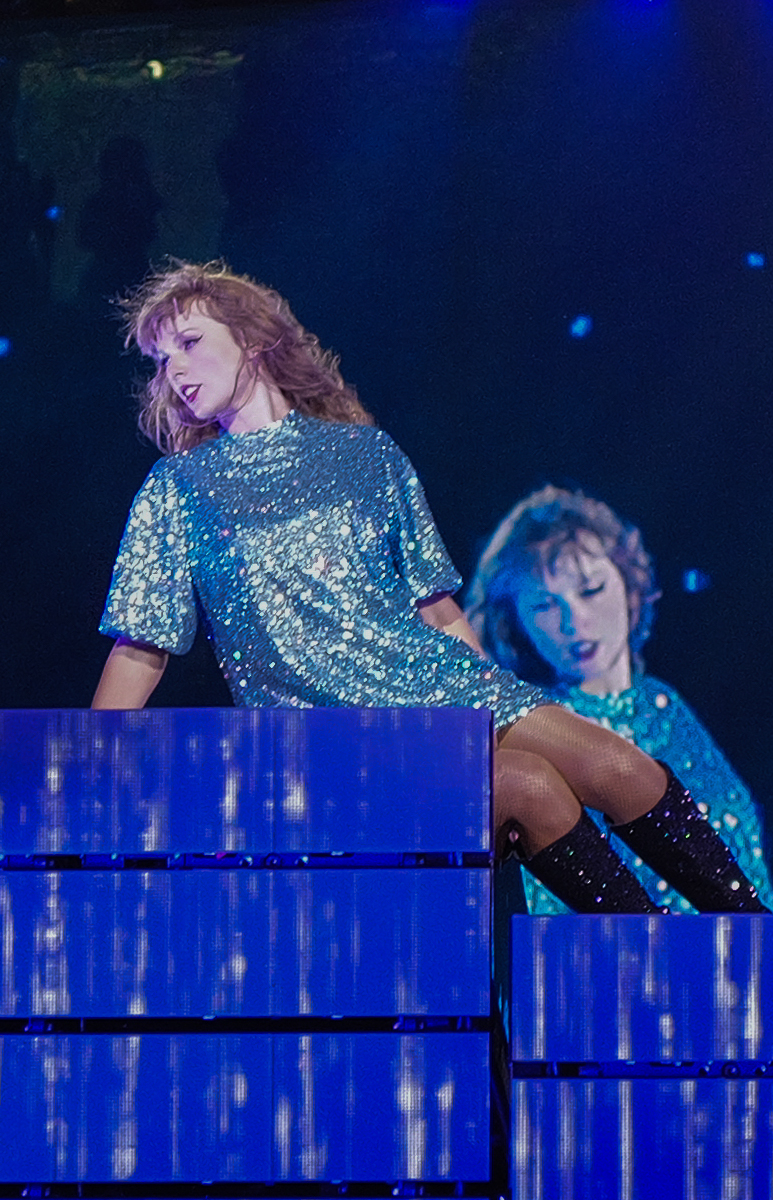
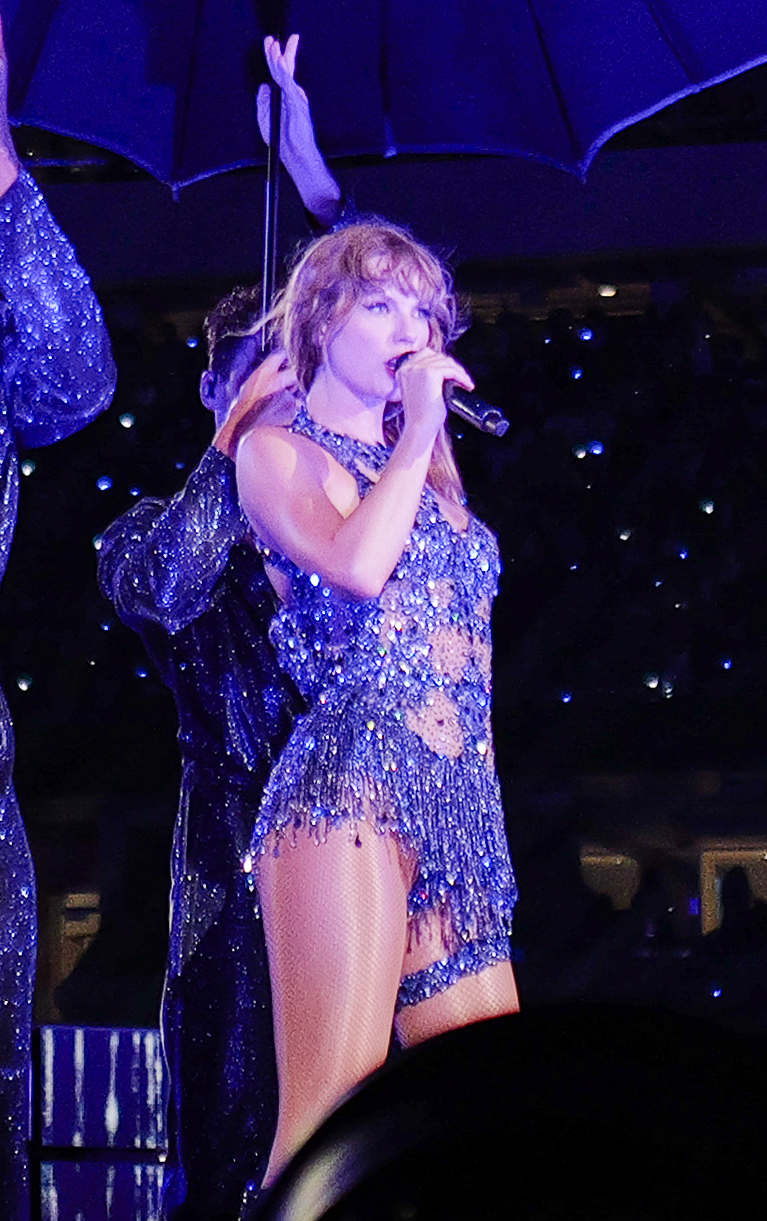
During the performance of "Midnight Rain" on the Eras Tour, Swift changed her costume from an oversize silver shirt (left) to a rhinestone bodysuit (right).

Swift performed "Midnight Rain" as part of the Midnights act on her sixth concert tour, the Eras Tour (2023–2024). The number started with the synth vocal hook. Dressed in an oversize silver shirt, Swift walked up a lifted platform while the stage lighting and visuals mimicked rain. The dancers performed a choreography using umbrellas and twirling movements that resembled a ballet, spinning on one foot with a low extended leg.

After the first verse, Swift fell from the platform and was carried by one of the dancers, as the other dancers covered them in umbrellas for her to change her costume. While Swift was changing, one dancer performed pirouettes. She then appeared in a rhinestone bodysuit and performed the rest of the song. Hughes described the performance as captivating and wrote that it made the audience feel like "we're underwater or in a heavy downpour", although she contended that it did not fully portray the song's intense soundscape.

== Credits and personnel ==
Credits are adapted from the liner notes of Midnights.

Studios

- Recorded at Rough Customer Studio, Brooklyn; and Electric Lady Studios, New York City
- Mixed by Serban Ghenea at MixStar Studios, Virginia Beach, Virginia
- Mastered by Randy Merrill at Sterling Sound, Edgewater, New Jersey

Personnel

- Taylor Swift – vocals, songwriter, producer
- Jack Antonoff – songwriter, producer, modular synths, Juno 6, Moog, Prophet 5, drums, programming, percussion, recording
- Laura Sisk – recording
- Megan Searl – assistant engineer
- Jon Sher – assistant engineer
- John Rooney – assistant engineer
- Randy Merrill – mastering engineer
- Serban Ghenea – mixing engineer
- Bryce Bordone – assistant mix engineer

== Charts ==
Chart performance for "Midnight Rain"
Chart (2022–2023)	Peak position
Argentina Hot 100 (Billboard)	94
Australia (ARIA)	5
Austria (Ö3 Austria Top 40)	52
Canada Hot 100 (Billboard)	5
Czech Republic Singles Digital (ČNS IFPI)	22
Denmark (Tracklisten)	33
France (SNEP)	111
Germany (GfK)	92
Global 200 (Billboard)	5
Greece International (IFPI)	8
Hungary (Stream Top 40)	37
Iceland (Tónlistinn)	14
India International Singles (IMI)	10
Ireland (IRMA)	44
Italy (FIMI)	84
Lithuania (AGATA)	22
Luxembourg (Billboard)	19
Malaysia International (RIM)	4
Norway (VG-lista)	35
Philippines (Billboard)	2
Portugal (AFP)	10
Singapore (RIAS)	3
Slovakia Singles Digital (ČNS IFPI)	28
South Africa (RISA)	13
Spain (Promusicae)	50
Sweden (Sverigetopplistan)	28
Swiss Streaming (Schweizer Hitparade)	26
UK Audio Streaming (Official Charts)	7
US Billboard Hot 100	5
Vietnam Hot 100 (Billboard)	6

== Certifications ==
Certifications for "Midnight Rain"
Region	Certification	Certified units/sales
Australia (ARIA)	2× Platinum	140,000^{‡}
Brazil (Pro-Música Brasil)	Platinum	40,000^{‡}
Canada (Music Canada)	Platinum	80,000^{‡}
New Zealand (RMNZ)	Platinum	30,000^{‡}
Spain (Promusicae)	Gold	30,000^{‡}
United Kingdom (BPI)	Gold	400,000^{‡}
^{‡} Sales+streaming figures based on certification alone.
