= 'Tis the Damn Season =

2020 song by Taylor Swift

Song by Taylor Swift

from the album Evermore
- Written: September 2020
- Released: December 11, 2020
- Studio: Kitty Committee (Beverly Hills)
- Genre: Folk
- Length: 3:49
- Label: Republic
- Songwriters: Taylor Swift; Aaron Dessner
- Producer: Aaron Dessner

Lyric video
- "'Tis the Damn Season" on YouTube

"'Tis the Damn Season" is a song by the American singer-songwriter Taylor Swift from her ninth studio album, Evermore (2020). She wrote the song with Aaron Dessner, who produced it using an instrumental track he had written prior. "'Tis the Damn Season" is a folk song instrumented by a finger-picked electric guitar and programmed drums. Narrated from the perspective of a female character named Dorothea, the lyrics detail her returning to her hometown during the holiday season and engaging in a quickly-faded rekindled relationship.

Music critics considered "'Tis the Damn Season" a twist on traditional upbeat holiday music. They lauded Swift's songwriting and the production for creating nostalgia-inducing lyrics and music, and some picked the song as an album highlight. The track peaked at number 23 on the Billboard Global 200 and entered on the charts of Australia, Canada, Portugal, and the United States. It was certified platinum in Australia, gold in Brazil, and silver in the United Kingdom. "'Tis the Damn Season" was included in the set list of Swift's sixth headlining concert tour, the Eras Tour (2023–2024) through the sixth Singapore show.

== Background and release ==
Amidst the COVID-19 lockdowns, Taylor Swift wrote songs and produced her eighth studio album, Folklore, with Aaron Dessner and Jack Antonoff. Surprise-released on July 24, 2020. Folklore incorporated styles of indie folk, which was new for Swift and garnered widespread critical acclaim.

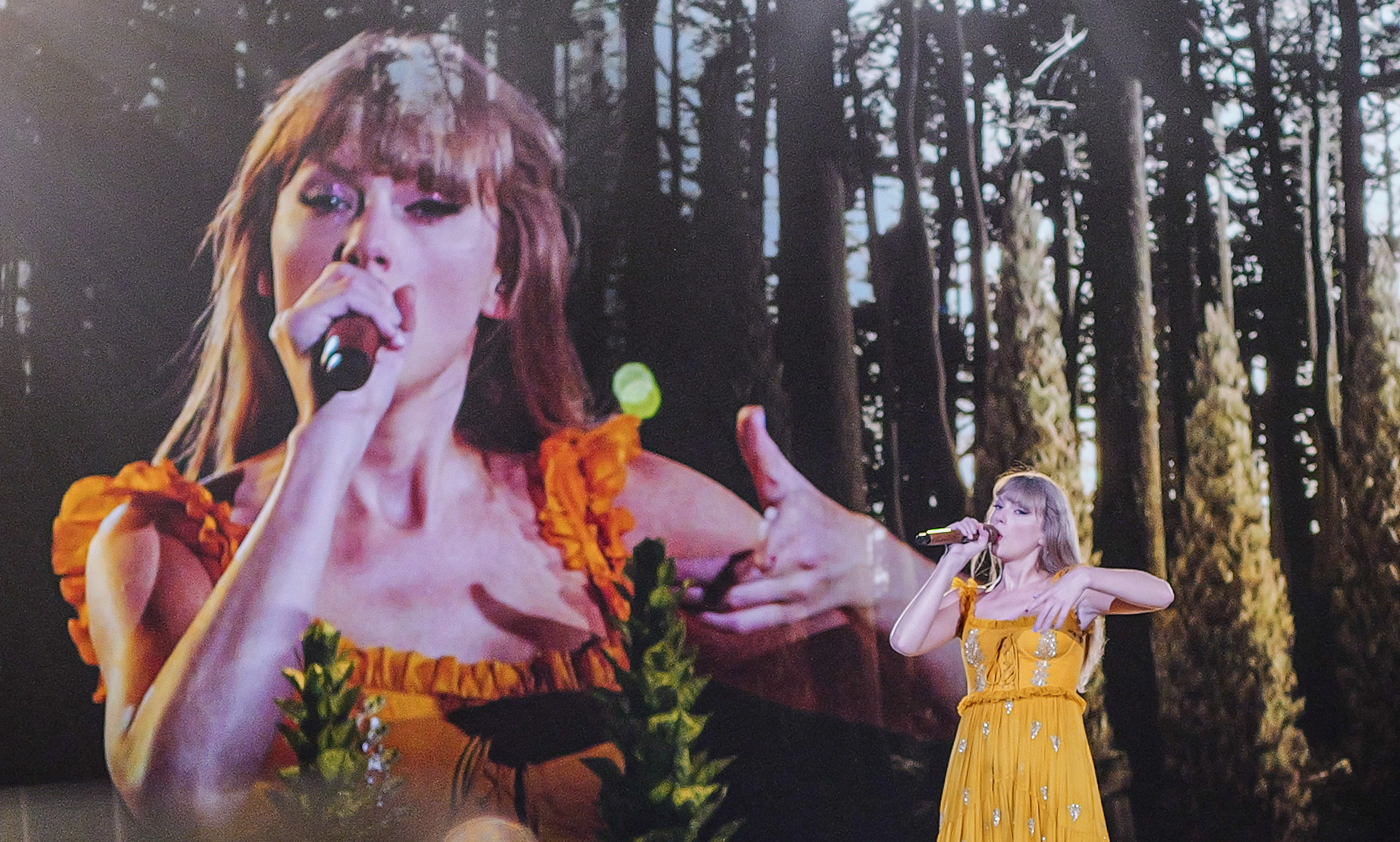
Swift performed "'Tis the Damn Season" during the 2023 shows of the Eras Tour.

In September 2020, Swift, Antonoff, and Dessner assembled at Long Pond Studio in Hudson Valley to film Folklore: The Long Pond Studio Sessions, a concert film consisting of stripped-down renditions of tracks from Folklore and recounting the creative process behind the album. After filming, the three celebrated Folklore by drinking and unexpectedly continued writing songs while staying at Long Pond. Swift wrote "'Tis the Damn Season" while drunk on the first day of rehearsal and sang it to Dessner the next day. Dessner told Billboard that it was a "surreal" moment when "[his] brain exploded". Dessner had written an instrumental track "a long time ago" and described it as one of his favorite works. He recounted that the song could have remained as it was but said "[Swift's] incredible storytelling ability and musical ability" took the track to "something much greater".

The final result, "'Tis the Damn Season", was included as an album track on Swift's ninth studio album, Evermore, a continuation of the folk styles on Folklore. Evermore was surprise-released on December 11, 2020, five months after Folklore. "'Tis the Damn Season" is track number four on the track listing. Before the release, Swift teased the track title via an Instagram story on December 9. The song was included on the set list of the Eras Tour (2023–24), Swift's sixth headlining concert tour, as part of the show's Evermore set. The song was replaced by "No Body, No Crime" at the shows where the pop rock band Haim was as an opening act. It was removed from the tour's set list on May 9, 2024, but was performed as a mashup with "Daylight" (2019) on the tour's Edinburgh stop on June 7.

== Composition and lyrics ==
"'Tis the Damn Season"
"'Tis the Damn Season" is driven by sparse programmed drums and a finger-picked electric guitar line that critics found wintry and nostalgia-inducing.

"'Tis the Damn Season" was recorded at Kitty Committee Studio in Beverly Hills, California. It is a folk song driven by a finger-picked electric guitar line and drum programming by Dessner, who contended that the guitar evoked a wintry atmosphere and the drums were minimalistic. Rolling Stone journalist Claire Shaffer wrote that the guitar line was "icy" and evoked the music by Dessner's band the National, Rob Sheffield described it as "U2-style" and reminiscent of Swift's 2012 song "State of Grace", and Entertainment Weekly critic Maura Johnston said that it "[swirls] like Hallmark-movie snowflakes". According to Dessner, the musical instruments that he played brought forth a nostalgic feel, a sentiment that was also acknowledged by Rolling Stone critic Brittany Spanos and NPR critic Stephen Thompson. Some critics described the song as a twist on traditional upbeat Christmas and holiday music. Other instruments played by Dessner include acoustic guitar, bass, and piano; other musicians played cello (Clarice Jensen), harmonium and lap steel guitar (Josh Kaufman), Hammond B3 (Nick Lloyd), keyboards and synthesizers (Thomas Bartlett), trombone (Benjamin Lanz), and violin (Yuki Numata Resnick).

"'Tis the Damn Season" has lyrics that complement the nostalgic sentiment of its production. The track is narrated from the perspective of a woman named Dorothea, a Hollywood actress who returns to her hometown of Tupelo, Mississippi to visit her family during the Christmas and holiday season. While at her hometown, Dorothea encounters a former lover from her high-school days and rekindles the relationship with this person. She finds comfort in her hometown romance but realizes she does not fit in well anymore and has to return to Los Angeles. This short-lived rekindled relationship ultimately ends, which Dorothea reluctantly accepts. In the bridge, Dorothea admits that the rekindled relationship had an emotional impact on her. She pleads to the former lover that she might stay at her hometown if he asked her to. As Dorothea finally leaves, she painfully reminisces her luxurious lifestyle and acting career there and appreciates the comfort of her hometown and the unnamed addressee; before going back to Los Angeles and her "so-called friends", she confesses that the lover is "the only soul who can tell which smiles [she's] fakin'". "Dorothea", another Evermore track, is from the unnamed former lover's perspective and addressed to Dorothea.

Chris Willman from Variety summed up the narrative as a "fairly unsentimental ode to hometown ex sex during the holidays". Jason Lipshutz of Billboard considered "'Tis the Damn Season" a more uplifting track "offering hope and levity" compared to other album tracks of "long-brewing hurt and soured unions". Brodie Lancaster of The Sydney Morning Herald thought that the track contained "references to suburban nostalgia", while Madeline Crone of American Songwriter characterized the storyline as "the all-too-familiar night before Thanksgiving narrative". Katherine Rodgers of The Quietus thought that Swift's delivery was "breathless" and "hopelessly romantic" with a "momentum" that gathered as she "[punctuated]" the lyrics "Write this down", "Hear me out". Several critics commented that the corresponding storylines of "'Tis the Damn Season" and "Dorothea" were similar to that of the Folklore tracks "Cardigan", "August", and "Betty", which depicted a love triangle between three fictitious characters from their respective viewpoints.

== Critical reception ==
"'Tis the Damn Season" received critical acclaim for its storytelling lyrics. Johnston, Annie Zaleski of The A.V. Club, Jonathan Keefe of Slant Magazine, and Mary Siroky from Consequence praised the emotional engagement of the song and picked it as album highlight. Alexis Petridis from The Guardian selected it as one of Evermore's tracks that best employed character studies in Swift's songwriting. Patrick Ryan of USA Today identified the track as a hallmark of Evermore's "escapist fantasy" that slips between various narratives and perspectives. Shaffer similarly deemed it representative of the album's "story songs" with fictitious characters and narratives, and Spanos described the song as a "nostalgic gut-punch" with nostalgia-inducing "lyrical flourishes" that constituted a less idealistic narrative than traditional Christmas songs. Carl Wilson lauded it as Swift's "great Christmas song", saying that it was the first track on Evermore that captured his attention. Lancaster remarked that the sentiment evoked by the song's lyricism was "powerful".

Other critics praised the production and commented on how it complemented the lyrics. Lipshutz ranked the song 7th out of the 17 Evermore tracks, applauding how "each lyrical detail sparkles" and "Dessner's electric guitar clangs on like a memory Swift can't escape"; he opined that the production would fit in Swift's past albums Speak Now (2010) and Red (2012) but her "voice [was] wiser". Petridis described it as a "neat and rather moving" twist on Christmas music. Sam Sodomsky of Pitchfork complimented how Swift "treats Dessner's electric guitar framework as an empty diary page" to conjecture the lyrical details. Rodgers said the song was written in "classic Swiftian mode" but also built on Folklore's strengths. Konstantinos Pappis of Our Culture Mag wrote that "Dessner's swirling guitars and intricate percussion elevate Swift's evocative lyrics". Sheffield complimented the production as "an astoundingly great stadium-quaker" after it was featured on the Eras Tour concerts. Thompson and Alan Light of Esquire picked "'Tis the Damn Season" as an album highlight and a potential career best for Swift. The former lauded the guitar line as "absolutely devastating" and the songwriting as a "master class" displaying Swift's talents. Steven Hyden of Uproxx, while deeming "'Tis the Damn Season" a standout on Evermore, said that it failed to match the best tracks on Folklore.

== Commercial performance ==
"'Tis the Damn Season" debuted and peaked at 39 on the Billboard Hot 100 chart dated December 26, 2020. The song debuted at number 6 on Hot Rock & Alternative Songs, a genre-specific Billboard chart, where it spent seven weeks. It debuted at 13 on the Rolling Stone Top 100, with 134,000 units sold and 16.2 million streams in its first week. The track peaked at number 23 on the Billboard Global 200 and appeared on singles charts in Canada (number 13), Australia (number 24), and Portugal (number 101). In the United Kingdom, "'Tis the Damn Season" peaked at number 52 on the Official Audio Streaming Chart and was certified silver by the British Phonographic Industry (BPI).

== Credits and personnel ==
- Taylor Swift – vocals, songwriting
- Aaron Dessner – songwriting, production, recording, acoustic guitar, bass, drum machine, electric guitar, piano, synthesizer
- Clarice Jensen – cello
- Nick Lloyd – Hammond B3
- Josh Kaufman – harmonium, lap steel guitar
- Benjamin Lanz – horn arranger, trombone
- Thomas Bartlett – keyboards, synthesizer
- Greg Calbi – mastering
- Steve Fallone – mastering
- Jonathan Low – mixing, recording, vocal engineering
- Yuki Numata Resnick – violin

== Charts ==
=== Weekly charts ===
Weekly chart performance for "'Tis the Damn Season"
Chart (2020–2021)	Peak position
Australia (ARIA)	24
Canada Hot 100 (Billboard)	13
Global 200 (Billboard)	23
Portugal (AFP)	101
UK Audio Streaming (Official Charts)	52
US Billboard Hot 100	39
US Hot Rock & Alternative Songs (Billboard)	6
US Rolling Stone Top 100	13

=== Year-end charts ===
Year-end chart performance for 'Tis the Damn Season"
Chart (2021)	Position
US Hot Rock & Alternative Songs (Billboard)	43

== Certifications ==
Certifications for "'Tis the Damn Season"
Region	Certification	Certified units/sales
Australia (ARIA)	Platinum	70,000^{‡}
Brazil (Pro-Música Brasil)	Gold	20,000^{‡}
New Zealand (RMNZ)	Gold	15,000^{‡}
United Kingdom (BPI)	Silver	200,000^{‡}
^{‡} Sales+streaming figures based on certification alone.
