= How Long Do You Think It's Gonna Last? =

Studio album by Big Red Machine
- Released: August 27, 2021
- Studios: Long Pond (Hudson Valley, New York); Kitty Committee (Los Angeles, California); April Base (Eau Claire, Wisconsin)
- Genre: Pop
- Length: 64:38
- Labels: 37d03d; Jagjaguwar
- Producer: Aaron Dessner

Big Red Machine chronology
Big Red Machine (2018)	How Long Do You Think It's Gonna Last? (2021)

Singles from How Long Do You Think It's Gonna Last?
- 1. "Latter Days" Released: June 29, 2021; 2. "The Ghost of Cincinnati" Released: June 30, 2021; 3. "Renegade" Released: July 2, 2021; 4. "Phoenix" Released: August 2, 2021; 5. "Mimi" Released: August 5, 2021

How Long Do You Think It's Gonna Last? is the second studio album by American indie duo Big Red Machine, which consists of musicians Aaron Dessner and Justin Vernon. It was released on August 27, 2021, via 37d03d and Jagjaguwar record labels. Dessner stated the album is built around themes of childhood, familial dynamics, and mental health. He cited The Last Waltz, the 1978 live album by the Band, as an inspiration for the record.

The album is a collaborative effort featuring guest vocals from an array of artists–Anaïs Mitchell, Taylor Swift, Fleet Foxes, Ilsey, Naeem, Sharon Van Etten, Lisa Hannigan, Shara Nova, La Force, Ben Howard and This Is the Kit. Musically, the record is a mostly slow-paced pop album, consisting of midtempo songs led by soft pianos and guitars, as well as drawing from the indie rock and electronic styles of Dessner and Vernon, respectively. The subject matter covered in the album includes a variety of sombre themes, such as love, loss, grief, nostalgia, reconciliation, and the odyssey of life. Five singles preceded the album: "Latter Days" featuring Mitchell, "The Ghost of Cincinnati", "Renegade" featuring Swift, "Phoenix" featuring Mitchell and Fleet Foxes, and "Mimi" featuring Ilsey. Upon release, How Long Do You Think It's Gonna Last? was met with generally positive comments from music critics, who mostly complimented its melancholic lyrics, stylistic sound, and guest contributions, but cited its frequently monotonous instrumentation as a drawback.

== Background ==
Big Red Machine is an American supergroup formed by musicians Aaron Dessner and Justin Vernon in 2008. Dessner is best known as the guitarist of the American indie rock band the National, whereas Vernon the vocalist of American indie folk band Bon Iver. Big Red Machine released their self-titled debut studio album on August 31, 2018, to positive reviews. Since Big Red Machine, Dessner and Vernon have worked with R.E.M.'s Michael Stipe on the track "No Time for Love Like Now" (2019), covered Aimee Mann's "Wise Up" (2020), and more. In August 2020, Bon Iver released a song called "AUATC" featuring Bruce Springsteen, Jenny Lewis, and Jenn Wasner.

Development for their second studio album began in spring 2019. In December 2020, Dessner revealed that American singer-songwriter Taylor Swift, who he had worked with on her eighth studio album Folklore, had written two songs, "Closure" and "Dorothea", for Big Red Machine's forthcoming project. However, the songs landed on her ninth studio album, Evermore, instead.

== Writing and recording ==
This is all music I initially generated and feel emotionally connected to, but it has been very interesting to hear how different people relate to it and how different voices collide with it. That's what makes it special. With everyone that's on this record, there's an openness, a creative generosity and an emotional quality that connects it all together.

— Dessner on the album's nature, Uproxx

Dessner described the album as a collaborative project. The collaborations are with the artists who Dessner and Vernon had been working with in 2020. Unlike its predecessor Big Red Machine, which leaned heavily on Vernon's voice, How Long Do You Think It's Gonna Last? features an array of guest vocalists, such as Anaïs Mitchell, Taylor Swift, American indie-folk band Fleet Foxes, American singer-songwriter Ilsey, American rapper Naeem (popularly known as Spank Rock), American singer-songwriter Sharon Van Etten, Irish musician Lisa Hannigan, American musician Shara Nova (of band My Brightest Diamond), La Force (solo project of Canadian indie pop singer Ariel Engle), English singer-songwriter Ben Howard, and British folk rock musician This Is The Kit; Notably, Mitchell is featured on three tracks, while Swift is on two.

Dessner provided lead vocals for the first time in his career, on three tracks; they are "Magnolia", "Brycie" and "The Ghost of Cincinnati". Mitchell stated Dessner was nervous about having his own lead vocals on the songs and that she encouraged him to "absolutely" record his own, especially after his work with Swift on Folklore and Evermore, Mitchel felt that it is "nice to have people get a look behind that curtain, to get to know the person who's behind a bunch of this stuff." "The Ghost of Cincinnati" was a song that Dessner had meant for Swift's project, but she convinced him it fit Big Red Machine's record more. It was inspired by a screenplay called Dandelion by filmmaker Nicole Riegel, who also co-wrote the lyrics. Dessner said the song is about "someone who feels like a ghost, stalking the streets of their hometown, interrogating the past and contemplating their fate". "Brycie" is one of the first songs Dessner wrote for the album. He wrote it to express gratitude to his twin brother and National bandmate, Bryce Dessner, who "saw him through bouts of depression".

Much of the album was recorded at Dessner's Long Pond Studio in Hudson Valley, New York, "Renegade" was recorded at Swift's Los Angeles in-home studio, Kitty Committee, in the same week both her and Dessner had won the Album of the Year for Folklore at the 63rd Annual Grammy Awards. Dessner stated that Swift was "very helpful and engaged" with the band throughout the recording process. Many of the album's tracks were tested on-road at Big Red Machine concerts around the world, including "Easy To Sabotage" and "Reese". Dessner stated he was using the project "to really try different things, and find the connection between my different impulses".

"Phoenix" was one of the last songs written for the album. Vernon first conceived the melody of the song's chorus while driving, and Dessner forwarded its sketch to American singer-songwriter Robin Pecknold, the vocalist of Fleet Foxes, whom Dessner had been "dreaming" to collaborate on the album. Nico Lang and Pecknold wrote the song's verses and pre-chorus in form of a dialogue with Vernon, recalling a conversation Pecknold and Vernon once had backstage in Phoenix, Arizona. Mitchell penned the lyrics to the chorus, with drums by JT Bates. "Mimi" was written by Dessner, Vernon, and Ilsey in isolation, inspired by the former's gratitude towards his children. James Krivchenia provided the drums in the song.

Dessner said that he viewed How Long Do You Think It's Gonna Last? as a version of The Last Waltz, the 1978 album by Canadian rock band the Band. For its instrumentation, he took cues the Band, and American rock band Grateful Dead as well. The orchestrations of How Long Do You Think It's Gonna Last? were composed by Bryce Dessner.

== Promotion and release ==
A promotional collage posted by Big Red Machine, depicting all of the vocalists in How Long Do You Think It's Gonna Last?

On June 27, 2021, a cryptic video teaser was posted to Big Red Machine's social media accounts. It featured layered, multi-colored visuals, depicting Vernon and Dessner, and shots of Swift's handwriting. Two days later, the band announced their second studio album, titled How Long Do You Think It's Gonna Last?, would be released on August 27, 2021, by the band's own record label 37D03D and American independent label Jagjaguwar. The band also revealed the cover artwork and the track listing. The digital, CD, vinyl and cassette versions of the album were made available for pre-order. On August 9, 2021, Dessner was interviewed by Elton John on Apple Music 1 about How Long Do You Think It's Gonna Last? On August 10, 2021, Big Red Machine, Mitchell, and Pecknold performed "Phoenix", and debuted the track "New Auburn" live on The Late Show with Stephen Colbert. An interview of Dessner by music journalist Jon Pareles was published on The New York Times on August 19, 2021, in which Dessner explained the album's making.

=== Singles ===
"Latter Days" featuring American singer-songwriter Anaïs Mitchell was launched as the first single from the album, a song Vernon had debuted live in October 2020 during a Visit With Vernon live session. Dessner stated, "It was clear to Anaïs that the early sketch Justin and I made of 'Latter Days' was about childhood, or loss of innocence and nostalgia for a time before you've grown into adulthood — before you've hurt people or lost people and made mistakes. She defined the whole record when she sang that, as these same themes kept appearing again and again." "The Ghost of Cincinnati" was released as the next single on June 30, 2021.

"Renegade", featuring Swift, was released on July 2, 2021, as the third single from the album. It was serviced to U.S. adult album alternative radio the same day, and the adult contemporary radio on July 12, 2021. "Renegade" marked Big Red Machine's first entry on various record charts around the globe. In the United States, the song arrived at number 73 on the Billboard Hot 100, number seven on the Billboard Alternative Songs chart, and topped the Alternative Digital Songs Sales chart. "Phoenix", featuring Mitchell and Fleet Foxes, impacted U.S. adult album alternative radio on August 2, 2021, as the fourth single. "Mimi", featuring Ilsey, was released on August 5, 2021, as the next single.

== Title and artwork ==
Swift suggested the lyric written by Mitchell, "How long do you think it's gonna last?", in the track "Latter Days", as the title for the album. The promotional photos for the album were shot and edited by photographer Graham Tolbert. The cover artwork is an edited "preschool-era" photograph of Aaron and Bryce Dessner, and their sister Jessica from their visit to their grandmother Stella's nursing home in 1980. Aaron Dessner explained that his grandmother was the first person the siblings had lost to death, and that "somehow it felt fitting" to put her and themselves in the album cover.

== Music and lyrics ==
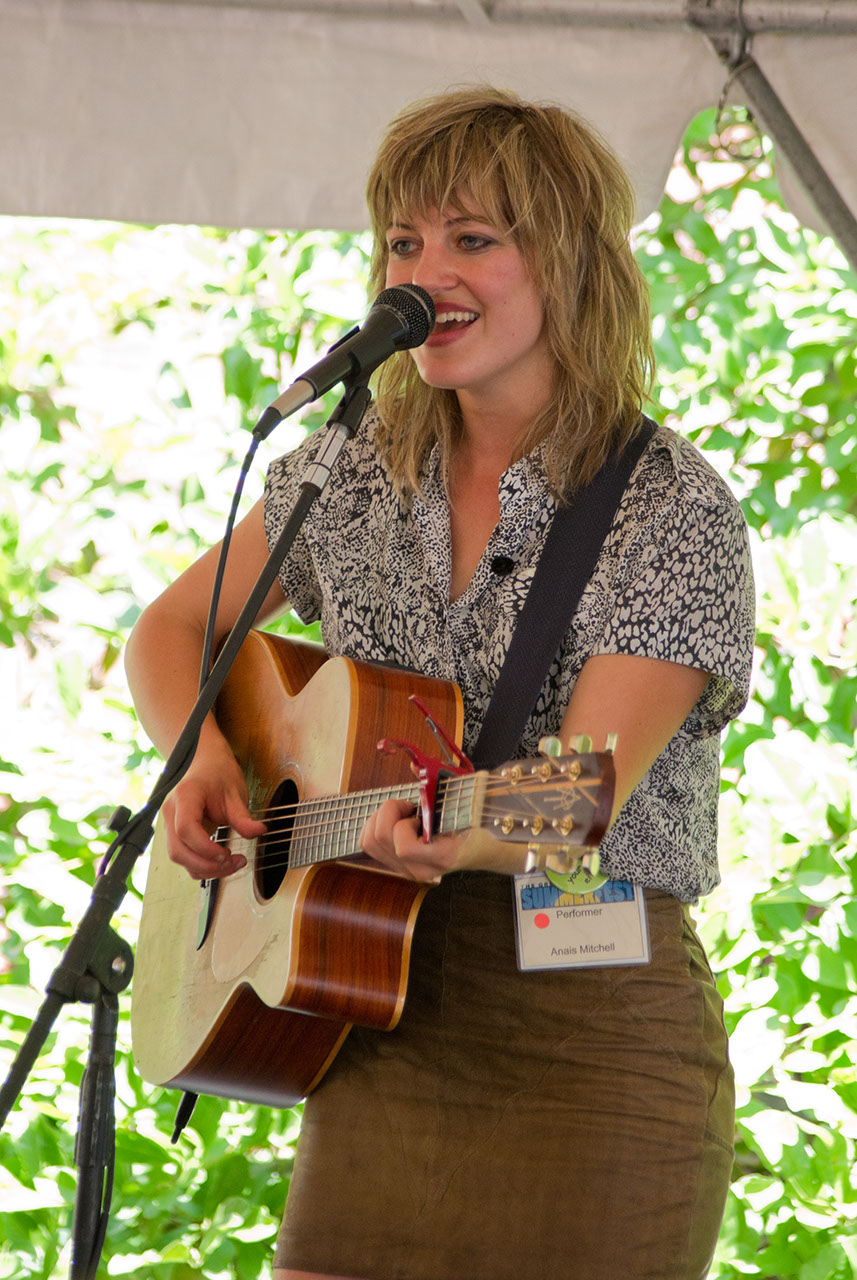
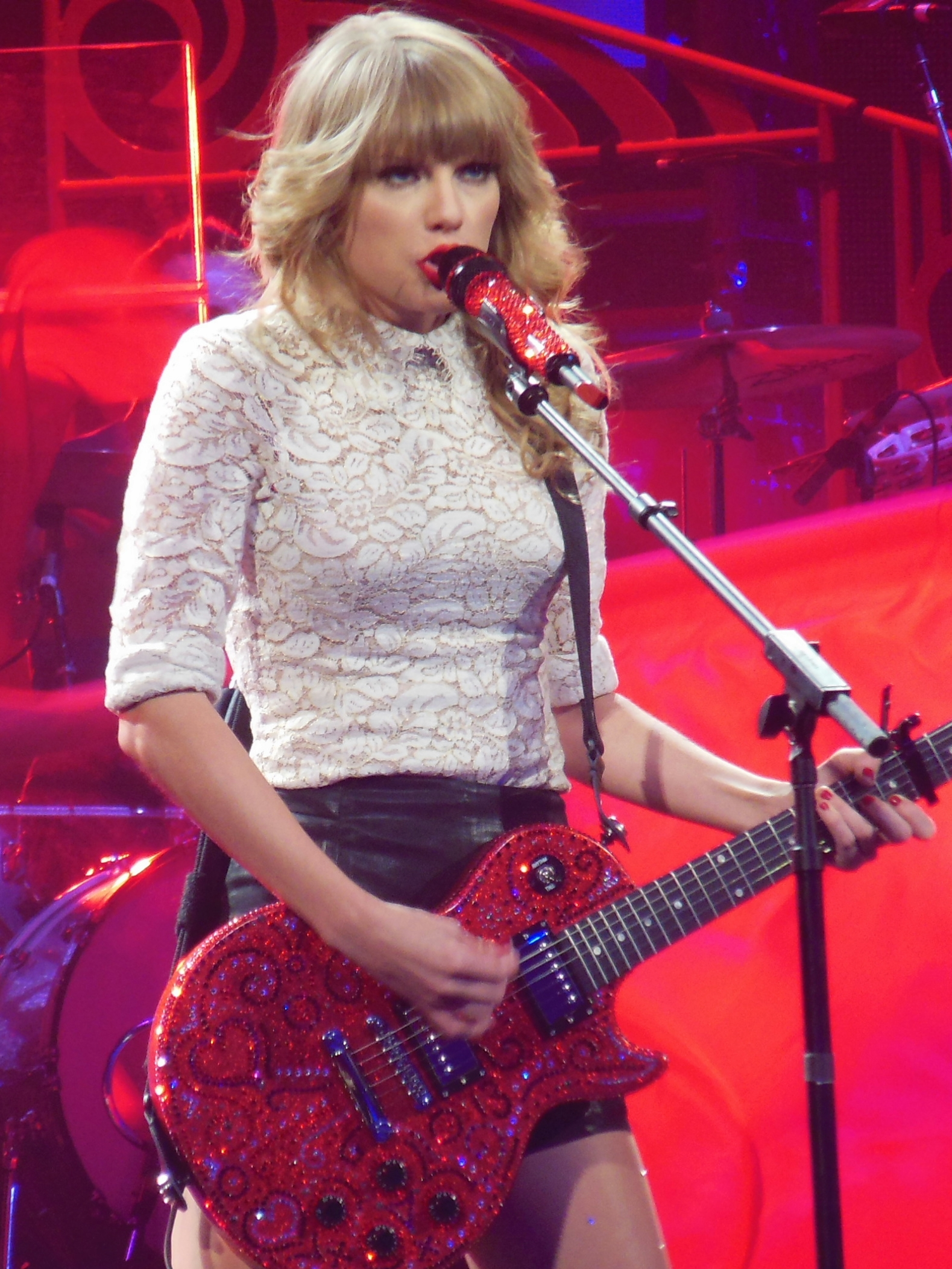
Anaïs Mitchell (left) and Taylor Swift (right) are featured on multiple tracks.

How Long Do You Think It's Gonna Last? centers on themes of childhood, family dynamics, mental health, friends, love, break-ups, reconciliation, grief, wistful nostalgia, regret, among others. Musically, the album is a pop record, consisting of songs generally set to slower tempos. It incorporates indie rock styles and glitchy electronic elements. Driven by soft pianos and guitars, its tracks are characterized by their traditional song structures and fully "fleshed-out" arrangements.

It consists of 15 tracks, nine of which feature vocals from guest acts. "Latter Days" is a piano ballad with an atmospheric texture, in which Mitchell's voice melds with Vernon's falsetto. "Reese" is a piano-led, folk rock tune. "Birch" is a "jazzy" duet between Swift and Vernon. It is a stripped-back song driven by a piano. "Renegade" features Swift's lead vocals, and discusses the role of fear and anxiety in love. "Phoenix" is a country rock song, titled after Phoenix, Arizona. "The Ghost of Cincinnati" is an acoustic tune, completely sung by Dessner. It is about introspection and contemplation of past while taking a stroll through hometown like ghost haunting the streets. "Mimi" is titled after Dessner's youngest daughter. "Easy to Sabotage" incorporates recordings of its live performances at two different shows in New York, and makes use of auto-tune. It features improvised "semi-raps" from Vernon and Naeem over rough drums. "Hutch", featuring "haunting" harmonies by Van Etten, Hannigan and Nova, is a tribute to late Frightened Rabbit frontman Scott Hutchison, a close friend of Aaron Dessner. "June's a River" is a folk love song, blending vocals from Howard and This Is The Kit in "lush harmony". A tribute to Bryce Dessner, "Brycie" begins with folk guitars and grows into a patchwork of organic and synthetic sounds behind Aaron Dessner's gentle vocals. The closing track, "New Auburn", is set in Wisconsin, having its narrator reminisce over childhood road trips.

== Critical reception ==
Professional ratings
Aggregate scores
Source	Rating
AnyDecentMusic?	7.2/10
Metacritic	76/100
Review scores
Source	Rating
AllMusic	3.5/5 stars
Evening Standard	4/5 stars
Exclaim!	7/10
The Guardian	3/5 stars
NME	4/5 stars
Pitchfork	7.0/10
Rolling Stone	3.5/5 stars
Slant Magazine	3.5/5 stars
Sputnikmusic	4.4/5
Uncut	9/10

How Long Do You Think It's Gonna Last? received positive reviews upon release. At Metacritic, the album received a score of 76 out of 100 based on fifteen reviews, indicating "generally favorable reviews".

Ian Gormely of Exclaim! dubbed the album a "masterclass" in production, and an "austere collection" of songs successfully blending Vernon's fondness for electronic music with Dessner's guitar and piano compositions. NME critic Elizabeth Audrey wrote the album's lyrics encompass "the full range of human emotion", while its music takes a braver direction than Big Red Machine's debut record. AllMusic's Marcy Donelson described How Long Do You Think It's Gonna Last? as a mellow, poignant, and immersive collection of songs adhering to "a dreamy, wistful, midtempo universe", seeing guest vocalists "float in and out of duets." Sputnikmusic said How Long Do You Think It's Gonna Last? is an experiment that could have failed, "drowned under the weight of its expectations and indie-sphere clout before it had a chance to breathe", but the sheer flair of Vernon-Dessner collaboration "makes it soar instead."

Sean Kerwick of DIY commented "there's a terrific bounty to be enjoyed in the centre of the Vernon-Dessner Venn diagram", appreciating their chemistry and guest singers' contributions. Jeremy Winograd of Slant stated the album is a "somber affair" like much of Dessner's works, but the guest vocalists and songwriting collaborators help the record reach "a much broader musical palette." Pitchfork critic Hannah Jocelyn dubbed it a solid record with a pleasant tone, but not a very innovative one for the band's discography, highlighting the presence of Dessner's "repetitive" piano chords in nearly all of its tracks. Music journalist Alexis Petridis expressed a slightly mixed opinion in his review on The Guardian. He admired Dessner's voice and called it the "most striking" amongst all of the featured vocalists, but stated the album feels longer than it is, due to its static tone, and some tracks more sentimental than they need to be.

== Track listing ==
Adapted from Spotify and YouTube.

How Long Do You Think It's Gonna Last? track listing
No.	Title	Writer(s)	Producer(s)	Length
1.	"Latter Days" (featuring Anaïs Mitchell)	Aaron Dessner; Mitchell; Justin Vernon	Dessner; Jonathan Low^{[a]}; Vernon^{[a]}; Brad Cook^{[a]}	3:38
2.	"Reese"	Dessner; Vernon	Dessner; Low^{[a]}; Vernon^{[a]}; Cook^{[a]}	5:13
3.	"Phoenix" (featuring Fleet Foxes and Anaïs Mitchell)	Dessner; Nico Lang; Robin Pecknold; Vernon; Mitchell	Dessner; Vernon^{[a]}; Low^{[a]}; Pecknold^{[a]}	4:16
4.	"Birch" (featuring Taylor Swift)	Dessner; Bryan Devendorf; Vernon	Dessner; Low^{[a]}; Vernon^{[a]}; Cook^{[a]}	5:30
5.	"Renegade" (featuring Taylor Swift)	Dessner; Swift	Dessner; Vernon^{[a]}; Low^{[a]}	4:14
6.	"The Ghost of Cincinnati"	Dessner; Nicole Riegel	Dessner; Low^{[a]}	3:37
7.	"Hoping Then"	Dessner; Vernon	Dessner	3:57
8.	"Mimi" (featuring Ilsey)	Ilsey Juber; Dessner; Vernon	Dessner; Vernon^{[a]}; Low^{[a]}	3:00
9.	"Easy to Sabotage" (featuring Naeem)	Dessner; Vernon; Naeem Juwan	Dessner	5:51
10.	"Hutch" (featuring Sharon Van Etten, Lisa Hannigan and Shara Nova)	Dessner; Vernon	Dessner	3:56
11.	"8:22AM" (featuring La Force)	Dessner; Ariel Engle; Devendorf; Vernon; Ragnar Kjartansson	Dessner	4:25
12.	"Magnolia"	Dessner	Dessner	3:56
13.	"June's a River" (featuring Ben Howard and This Is the Kit)	Dessner; Devendorf; Ben Howard	Dessner	4:27
14.	"Brycie"	Dessner; Jessica Reese Dessner	Dessner	5:14
15.	"New Auburn" (featuring Anaïs Mitchell)	Dessner; Mitchell; Vernon	Dessner	3:24
Total length:				64:38

Japanese edition bonus track
No.	Title	Length
16.	"No More Knees On" (featuring Isaiah Robinson and La Force)	4:38
Total length:		69:17

=== Note ===
- ^{^[a]}signifies an additional producer

== Personnel ==
Adapted from YouTube description and Genius credits.

- Aaron Dessner – bass guitar (tracks 1–5, 8–14), drum machine programming (tracks 1–5, 7, 8, 10–12, 14), piano (tracks 2–5, 7, 9, 11–15), acoustic guitar (tracks 2–8, 12), OP-1 (tracks 1–5, 8), electric guitar (tracks 2, 3, 5, 9–11), shaker (tracks 2, 3, 7, 12–14), synth (tracks 2, 4, 9, 10, 12, 14), high strung guitar (tracks 3, 8, 9, 12, 14), vocals (tracks 6–8, 12, 14), upright piano (tracks 1, 8, 10), rubber bridge guitar (tracks 3, 5), synthesizer (tracks 4, 13), other guitar (tracks 7, 12), synth bass (track 2), bass drum (track 4), clack (track 4), Prophet X (track 5), Mellotron (track 5), sequencer (track 7), snare (track 9), tambourine (track 10), kick drum (track 10), cymbal (track 13)
- Justin Vernon – vocals (tracks 1–5, 7–12, 14, 15), electric guitar (tracks 2, 5, 8, 10, 11), Mellotron (tracks 11, 15), whistling (track 1), synth (track 11), Messina (track 10)
- Bryce Dessner – orchestration (tracks 4, 7, 12, 14), electric guitar (tracks 2, 8, 13), acoustic guitar (track 14)
- James Krivchenia – drums (tracks 1, 4, 8–10, 14)
- JT Bates – drums (tracks 2–4, 9, 11, 15)
- Brad Cook – Mellotron (tracks 1, 10, 15), bass guitar (tracks 2, 9, 15), ebow bass (track 1), synth (track 10)
- Anaïs Mitchell – vocals (tracks 1, 3, 15)
- Michael Lewis – saxophone (tracks 2, 4, 11)
- Lisa Hannigan – vocals (tracks 2, 7, 10)
- Yuki Numata Resnick – violin (tracks 4, 7, 12), viola (track 4)
- Jason Treuting – drums (tracks 5, 9, 12)
- Dave Nelson – trombone (tracks 1, 10), trumpet (tracks 1, 10)
- Taylor Swift – vocals (tracks 4, 5), songwriting (track 5)
- Thomas Bartlett – piano (track 8), Prophet X (track 8), ELZ_1 Synthesizer (track 8), synthesizer (track 9), synth (track 9), Mellotron (track 9)
- Benjamin Lanz – modular synthesizer (track 8), synthesizer (track 14)
- Bryan Devendorf – drum machine programming (tracks 12, 13)
- Andrew Broder – synthesizer (track 1)
- Robin Pecknold – vocals (track 3), Mellotron (track 3), piano (track 3)
- Andy Clausen – trombone (track 3)
- Willem de Koch – trombone (track 3)
- Riley Mulherkar – trombone (track 3)
- Chloe Rowlands – trombone (track 3)
- Ryan Olson – Allovers Hi-Hat Generator (track 4)
- Kyle Resnick – flugelhorn (track 4)
- S. Carey – Prophet X (track 4)
- Ilsey Juber – vocals (track 8)
- Naeem – vocals (track 9)
- Sharon Van Etten – vocals (track 10)
- Shara Nova – vocals (track 10)
- Ariel Engle – vocals (track 11)
- This Is the Kit – vocals (track 13)
- Ben Howard – vocals (track 13)
- James McAlister – electronic drums (track 14)

== Charts ==
Chart performance for How Long Do You Think It's Gonna Last?
Chart (2021)	Peak position
Australian Albums (ARIA)	51
Belgian Albums (Ultratop Flanders)	9
Belgian Albums (Ultratop Wallonia)	179
Dutch Albums (Album Top 100)	17
German Albums (Offizielle Top 100)	18
Irish Albums (IRMA)	66
Scottish Albums (Official Charts)	15
Swiss Albums (Schweizer Hitparade)	88
UK Albums (Official Charts)	45
UK Independent Albums (Official Charts)	4
US Billboard 200	82
US Independent Albums (Billboard)	11
US Top Alternative Albums (Billboard)	12
US Top Rock Albums (Billboard)	12
