= Birch (song) =

2021 song by Big Red Machine featuring Taylor Swift

Song by Big Red Machine featuring Taylor Swift

from the album How Long Do You Think It's Gonna Last?
- Released: August 27, 2021
- Studio: Eaux Claires Hiver (Eau Claire, Wisconsin); Kitty Committee (Beverly Hills, California); Long Pond (Hudson Valley); Sonic Ranch (Tornillo, Texas)
- Length: 5:30
- Label: 37d03d; Jagjaguwar
- Songwriters: Aaron Dessner; Bryan Devendorf; Justin Vernon
- Producer: Aaron Dessner

Lyric video
- "Birch" on YouTube

"Birch" is a song by American indie music band Big Red Machine, which comprises Aaron Dessner and Justin Vernon. Featuring American singer-songwriter Taylor Swift, it was released as part of the duo's second studio album, How Long Do You Think It's Gonna Last? (2021). Dessner and Bryan Devendorf contributed to the music, where Vernon wrote over the lyrics and vocal melody. A stripped-back ballad sung by Vernon and Swift, "Birch" is led by electronic percussion, grand piano, and spacious strings. The lyrics depict one's search for peace and use imagery of trees and forests to portray their uncertainty of a situation they are facing.

There were comments about the song from critics, several of whom also discussed certain elements of it, including Swift's and Vernon's vocal performances. Commercially, "Birch" peaked at number 17 on both the Alternative Digital Song Sales and Rock Digital Song Sales charts in the United States.

== Background and release ==
In spring 2019, Big Red Machine's sole members, Aaron Dessner and Justin Vernon, started work on their second studio album, How Long Do You Think It's Gonna Last? During its development, Dessner collaborated with Taylor Swift on her 2020 albums Folklore and Evermore alongside Vernon and on her 2021 re-recorded album Fearless (Taylor's Version). According to Dessner, the Big Red Machine album consists of his music where multiple musicians incorporate their own style into it. Among those is Swift, featured on the tracks "Birch" and "Renegade".

Big Red Machine announced How Long Do You Think It's Gonna Last on June 29, 2021, as well as the tracklist that revealed the Swift-featured songs. Three days later, Dessner teased "Birch" during an interview with Zane Lowe on Apple Music by sharing more details of it. The song is placed as the fourth track on the album, which was released on August 27, through 37d03d and Jagjaguwar. In the United States, "Birch" was the second chart entry on Alternative Digital Song Sales and the first on Rock Digital Song Sales for Big Red Machine, debuting and peaking at number 17 on both.

== Development and recording ==
Development for the song began with Bryan Devendorf, who had a beat that Dessner worked with to create the music. As with all Big Red Machine tracks, "Birch" had the same writing process. Dessner first composed its music, which was in fall 2019 when he stopped working on the Big Red Machine album due to passing time and touring with his band the National at that period. Even so, "Birch" was a critical point in the album's development that motivated Dessner to return working on it. After finishing the music, he sent the resulting instrumental track to Vernon to write the lyrics and vocal melody, doing so immediately following its reception. "Birch" underwent multiple iterations brought by other musicians: Dessner's brother, Bryce, (Note: For consistency and clarity, this article will continue addressing Aaron Dessner as "Dessner".) orchestrated the track, and Swift included her vocals; she did her part when both Dessner and Vernon played the song for her during the finalization of Folklore's development and became fond of it.

Based on the description of its official lyric video on YouTube, "Birch" was recorded in several locations. Dessner and Jonathan Low did so in four studios, including Long Pond Studio in Hudson Valley. The other three were also where Low recorded vocals: he did as such with Vernon's at Sonic Ranch in Tornillo, Texas and Eaux Claires Hiver in Eau Claire, Wisconsin, and with Swift's at Kitty Committee Studio in Beverly Hills, California. Additional recordings were conducted by Kyle Resnick in Buffalo, New York, and Ryan Olson in Minneapolis. The song is five and a half minutes in length.

== Music and lyrics ==
"Birch" is a stripped-back ballad, led by electronic percussion, grand piano, and spacious strings. Beginning with a drum machine pattern, it incorporates a beat described by critics as "jarring", "propulsive", and "skittering", which Dessner shared as well. This is contrasted by a somewhat irregular rhythm played on piano, which precedes the drum machine. Basslines and guitar melodies are also included in this arrangement, which was fed through an Artificial Intelligence software from Olson that resequenced its audio into randomized patterns, a number of which were selected and featured on the track.

"Birch"
Vernon and Swift sing on top of one another in the chorus with lyrics about one's uncertainty of a situation (sampled), accompanied by electronic percussion, grand piano, and spacious strings.

Dessner described "Birch" as a duet between Vernon and Swift. Some critics share this view as well, while the majority of them relegate Swift's vocal contributions to only backing or harmony vocals. (Note: The opinion on backing vocals is attributed to Billboard's critics, Beats Per Minute's Tim Sentz, Rolling Stone's Rob Sheffield, Spin's Grant Sharples, The Wall Street Journal's Mark Richardson, and Uproxx's Derrick Rossignol, while the opinion on harmony vocals is attributed to AllMusic's Marcy Donelson.) Vernon's singing is somewhat guttural and performed in his falsetto, while that of Swift is soft. According to Dessner, the addition of the latter's vocals allowed the song to bring it quite "further into some heavenly place".

The lyrics of "Birch" describe one's exploration for peace. The song details their uncertainty of a situation they are confronting by employing imagery of trees and forests. They eventually acquire understanding during the track that changes their reality, starting with the way they woke up; Screen Rant's Molly Brizzell opined that Swift appears to assist them throughout.

== Critical reception ==
Many critics commented on "Birch" as a whole; they labeled the track as "flickering", "jazzy", "restless", and "wispily haunting". Tim Sentz of Beats Per Minute called it a "beautiful piano-led ballad", and NME's Elizabeth Aubrey said that the song was "lush" and that it and "Renegade" "feel close" to Swift's 2020 albums. A number of them discussed its elements as well. Also from NME, Ellie Robinson wrote that it was "cerebral" and affecting and compared certain parts to that of "Renegade": the former is "more relaxed and lowkey in its pacing", while the latter "wields a much more lively, pop-leaning energy". During an interview with Dessner on the podcast Switched On Pop, musicologist and host Nate Sloan picked "Birch" as a "great example" of how his music frequently surprises him when listening to it, noting the different styles combined on the track. Writing for DIY, Sean Kerwick found some moments on the song as well as on "Renegade" slightly "middle-of-the-road", attributing them to how the "ghosts" of Swift's and Dessner's partnership hovered too near to one another.

There were also comments on the song's vocal performances. In reviews of the Big Red Machine album, Vernon's performance received praise. AllMusic's Marcy Donelson believed that "Birch" was a high point for him, while Jeremy Winograd of Slant Magazine thought it was among the several album tracks where he laid an "indelible mark" on. Mark Richardson from The Wall Street Journal remarked that his falsetto was "piercing". Most opinions on Swift's performance were featured on certain worst-to-best rankings of her catalog that included the song. In his 2025 ranking of her 286 songs where "Birch" was listed at 225th, Rolling Stone's Rob Sheffield said that it was a continuation of her past duets with Vernon, offering "celestial harmonies" on the track. For the Billboard critics, who placed the song at 24th in a 2024 listicle of her 32 collaborations, it was one of her "most experimental", pinpointing that her vocals provide "a sweet calm amidst the storm". In an Uproxx article about "Birch", Derrick Rossignol said that she "wonderfully" accompanies Vernon's vocals on the track.

== Personnel ==
Adapted from the song's official lyric video on YouTube

- Justin Vernon – vocals, songwriting, additional production
- Taylor Swift – vocals
- Aaron Dessner – songwriting, production, acoustic guitar, bass guitar, bass drum, clack, drum machine programming, OP1, piano, synthesizer
- Bryan Devendorf – songwriting
- Bryce Dessner – orchestration
- James Krivchenia – drums
- JT Bates – drums
- Kyle Resnick – flugelhorn
- Michael Lewis – saxophone
- Ryan Olson – Allovers Hi-Hat Generator
- Sean Carey – Prophet X
- Yuki Numata Resnick – violins, violas
- Brad Cook – additional production
- Jonathan Low – additional production, recording

== Charts ==
Chart performance
Chart (2021)	Peak position
US Alternative Digital Song Sales (Billboard)	17
US Rock Digital Song Sales (Billboard)	17
