= Renegade (Big Red Machine song) =

2021 single by Big Red Machine featuring Taylor Swift

Single by Big Red Machine featuring Taylor Swift

from the album How Long Do You Think It's Gonna Last?
- Released: July 2, 2021
- Recorded: c. March 2021
- Studio: Kitty Committee (Los Angeles); Long Pond (Hudson Valley, New York); April Base (Eau Claire, Wisconsin)
- Genre: Folk-pop; indie folk; indie pop
- Length: 4:14
- Label: 37d03d; Jagjaguwar
- Songwriters: Aaron Dessner; Taylor Swift
- Producer: Aaron Dessner

Big Red Machine singles chronology
"The Ghost of Cincinnati" (2021)	"Renegade" (2021)	"Phoenix" (2021)

Taylor Swift singles chronology
"Gasoline" (2021)	"Renegade" (2021)	"I Bet You Think About Me" (2021)

Music video
- "Renegade" on YouTube

"Renegade" is a song recorded by American indie folk band Big Red Machine featuring American singer-songwriter Taylor Swift, released on July 2, 2021, by 37d03d and Jagjaguwar. It was serviced to US triple-A radio on the same day as the third single from the band's second studio album, How Long Do You Think It's Gonna Last? (2021).

Written by Swift and producer Aaron Dessner, "Renegade" is an upbeat tune that blends folk and indie pop styles, driven by guitar, drums and strings. Swift performs the lead vocals, complemented by Justin Vernon's backing vocals. Its subject matter discusses the toxic effects one's fears and mental health issues can have on their personal relationships, and the resulting confusion and indecision. It depicts the narrator's frustration with their emotionally fortified partner, and the former's efforts to confront and help the latter. Music critics acclaimed the song, with emphasis on its sharp lyrics and instrumentation.

Marking Big Red Machine's first entry in all of the record charts it appeared on, "Renegade" charted in Australia, Canada, Ireland, New Zealand, the United Kingdom and the United States. The song reached the top 10 of the UK Independent Singles and the US Hot Rock & Alternative Songs charts.

== Background and release ==
This song was something we wrote after we finished evermore and it dawned on us that this was a BRM [Big Red Machine] song. Taylor's words hit me so hard when I heard her first voice memo and still do, every time. Justin lifted the song further into the heavens, and my brother's (Bryce Dessner) strings and drummer Jason Treuting add so much. The feeling and sound of this song feel very much at the heart of How Long Do You Think It's Gonna Last?; I'm so grateful to Taylor for continuing to share her incredible talent with me and that we are still finding excuses to make music together.

— Aaron Dessner on "Renegade" to Zane Lowe, Pitchfork

American singer-songwriter Taylor Swift collaborated with Aaron Dessner, the guitarist of American indie rock band the National, and Justin Vernon, the vocalist of Bon Iver, on her eighth and ninth studio albums released in 2020, Folklore and Evermore, respectively. In a December 2020 interview for Rolling Stone, Dessner said that Swift had been writing songs for the upcoming project of Big Red Machine, a band consisting of Dessner and Vernon; two of those songs, "Dorothea" and "Closure", ended up appearing on the track-listing of Evermore instead. Dessner further produced two tracks on Swift's 2021 re-recording, Fearless (Taylor's Version). "Renegade" was recorded by him and Swift for Big Red Machine at her Los Angeles home studio, Kitty Committee, in the week ending March 19, 2021, the same week they had won Album of the Year for Folklore at the 63rd Annual Grammy Awards. Vernon recorded additional vocals at his studio, April Base.

On April 13, 2021, Vernon previewed new music on his Instagram account, in which he shared a brief clip of a forthcoming collaboration with Swift, saying "that's the awesome Taylor one. I think this should be the single". On June 27, 2021, a cryptic teaser was posted to Big Red Machine's social media. It depicted videos of Vernon and Dessner, and shots of Swift's penning lyrics. On June 29, 2021, the band revealed their second studio album, How Long Do You Think It's Gonna Last?, its release date, cover artwork and track listing; "Birch"—another Swift collaboration on the album—and "Renegade" placed fourth and fifth in the list, respectively, featuring Swift's vocals on both. "Latter Days" featuring Anaïs Mitchell was released as the lead single on the same day, followed by "The Ghost of Cincinnati" on the next day. "Renegade" was released as the next single on July 2, 2021, impacting U.S. adult album alternative radio on the same day. Another teaser was posted to the band's social media on July 1, 2021, a 14-second long snippet with Swift's vocals, captioned with a link to a YouTube video that premiered at midnight EDT, the lyric video of "Renegade" directed by Michael Brown. "Renegade" was serviced to the U.S. adult contemporary radio as well, on July 12, 2021. On August 17, a pop version of the song was released.

== Composition and lyrics ==
"Renegade"
A sample of the first chorus, which shows Swift's quick delivery of couplets over syncopated drums, guitar plucks, and Vernon's backing vocals.

A renegade is someone who has rejected lawful or conventional behavior. Addressed in second person, "Renegade" has the narrator describe how the subject's anxiety and fear are obstacles for the narrator's love for the subject. The song ends with the question "Is it insensitive for me to say, get your shit together so I can love you?", with the outcome remaining uncertain. "Renegade" is set in a C major key. Swift's vocals range between E_{3} and G_{4}. It has a fast tempo of 168 beats per minute.

"Renegade" is performed by Swift as the lead vocalist, backed by Vernon's additional vocals. The song was written by Dessner and Swift. Dessner stated he was emotionally struck the first time he heard Swift talk about "how anxiety and fear get in the way of loving someone or create an inability for someone to love". A retrospective examination of the song's lyrics possibly connects to Swift's relationship with then boyfriend Joe Alwyn. "Renegade" sums up that emotion with a "fairly experimental" sound. It is an upbeat alternative-indie, folk-pop, indie folk, and indie pop song with strings by Dessner and drums by So Percussion's Jason Treuting. Swift's vocal delivery is wordy, punctuated by brief plucks of gentle acoustic guitar and "rolling" synthesizers. The song ends with a polyphony of layered harmonies of Swift and Vernon.

== Critical reception ==
Spin critic Josh Chesler called "Renegade" an indie pop "banger", Lauren Huff of Entertainment Weekly dubbed it an earworm, and Variety's Jonathan Cohen said the song continued "the more musically adventurous vein" of Swift's latest work with Dessner, using emotionally stirring couplets. Robin Murray, wiring for Clash, dubbed the song "love-struck melodrama" with "piercing" lyrics. Nina Corcoran of Consequence wrote that "Renegade" is a "folk-pop earworm" with Swift's "future classic" lyrics. Mary Siroky of the same publication said that the song focuses on "someone refusing to let love in" and asks "how many times someone can be turned away while waiting patiently for the subject of their affection to realize it's ok to ask for help, and, sometimes, for forgiveness". Siroky also praised the diction and honesty of Swift's songwriting.

NPR's Stephen Thompson stated that Swift, in the song, "stares down a relationship that's become more toxic and labor-intensive than she'd been led to expect". He highlighted the lyric "Is it insensitive for me to say, 'Get your shit together so I can love you'?" and concluded "Renegade" sounds like a Swift song featuring Big Red Machine than the band featuring her. Devon Ivie of Vulture appreciated the song's "memorable" couplets. Pitchfork's rock critic Quinn Moreland said "Renegade" combines Swift's "thoughtful" 2020 songwriting with the "exploratory landscape" of Dessner and Vernon, and found the relationship described in the song as "claustrophobic and tangled in anxiety to the point of mutual destruction", filled with "frustration and indecision", juxtaposed against a "bright and warm" composition. Moreland added that Vernon and Swift's "dueling" harmonies spiral together into "a cocoon of confusion".

Savannah Roberts of Capital FM wrote "Renegade" depicts the effects mental health issues can have on "budding" relationships, and compared its lyrical style to Swift's older songs, such as "Call It What You Want" (2017) and "The Archer" (2019). Tatiana Tenreyro, reviewing for The A.V. Club admired the indie direction of Swift's recent works, and remarked that "Renegade" does not contain the "hyper-specific details" of her 2020 albums, but "a more relatable track, one that rings true to anyone who's been with an inadequate partner." Tenreyro added that Swift "undercuts the power of the person she's addressing—the one leading her on without being able to commit—by turning the tables and forcing them to confront their shit via her lyrical zingers." Jon Pareles of The New York Times commended Swift's "melodic sense and personality", her abrupt and "symmetrical" phrases, and Dessner's production details, such as "multilayered drones, tendrils of electric and acoustic guitar", and Vernon's "distant" backing vocals. Billboard writer Jason Lipshutz said the sonic texture of "Renegade" derives from the works by the National, with its "all skittering beats and emotional warfare for adults", but Swift's imprint in that musical territory "remains thrilling, even after many months and multiple Bon Iver duets". He concluded that the song is as "satisfying" as "Exile" (2020), Swift's first duet with Vernon.

== Commercial performance ==
"Renegade" marked Big Red Machine's first ever entry on various charts across the globe. In the United States, the song landed at number 7 on the Billboard Hot Alternative Songs chart dated July 17, 2021, introducing Big Red Machine on the chart for the first time, and the 18th entry of Swift's career. Additionally, it debuted at number one on the Billboard Alternative Digital Songs Sales chart, marking Swift's fourth number-one song on the chart. Furthermore, the song charted at number nine on the Billboard Hot Rock & Alternative Songs chart, number 12 on Alternative Streaming Songs, and number 73 on the all-genre Hot 100. Bolstered by its three tracking days of radio airplay, the song appeared at number 34 on the Billboard Adult Pop Songs chart. On the Rolling Stone Top 100, it entered at number 90, earning 38,300 units, including 3.7 million on-demand streams.

In the United Kingdom, "Renegade" opened at number 73 on the UK Singles Chart, scoring the band's first entry on the chart. Additionally, the song landed at number 9 on the UK Independent Singles Chart. In Canada, "Renegade" landed at number 11 on the Hot Canadian Digital Song Sales chart, and number 53 on the all-genre Canadian Hot 100. Elsewhere, it debuted at number 70 on Australia's ARIA Singles Chart, number 53 on the Irish Singles Chart, and number 3 on the New Zealand Hot Singles chart. "Renegade" arrived at number 96 on the Billboard Global 200 chart.

== Track listing ==
- Digital download and streaming
1. "Renegade" (featuring Taylor Swift) – 4:14
- Spotify
1. "Renegade" (featuring Taylor Swift) – 4:14
2. "Ghost of Cincinnati" – 3:37
3. "Latter Days" (featuring Anaïs Mitchell) – 3:58
- Digital download and streaming – pop version
1. Renegade (pop version) – 3:51

== Personnel ==
- Taylor Swift – vocals, songwriter
- Aaron Dessner – producer, songwriter, recording engineer, drum machine, Prophet X, Mellotron, piano, bass guitar, acoustic guitar, rubber bridge guitar, OP1, synth bass, electric guitar
- Justin Vernon – vocals, electric guitar, additional producer
- Bryce Dessner – orchestration
- Jason Treuting – drums
- Jonathan Low – recording engineer, additional producer

== Charts ==
=== Weekly charts ===
Weekly chart performance for "Renegade"
Chart (2021)	Peak position
Australia (ARIA)	70
Canada Hot 100 (Billboard)	58
Canada Hot AC (Billboard)	49
Global 200 (Billboard)	96
Ireland (IRMA)	53
New Zealand Hot Singles (RMNZ)	3
UK Singles (Official Charts)	73
UK Indie (Official Charts)	9
US Billboard Hot 100	73
US Adult Contemporary (Billboard)	20
US Adult Pop Airplay (Billboard)	14
US Hot Rock & Alternative Songs (Billboard)	9
US Rolling Stone Top 100	90

=== Year-end charts ===
Year-end chart performance for "Renegade"
Chart (2021)	Position
US Hot Rock & Alternative Songs (Billboard)	64

== Certifications ==
Certifications
Region	Certification	Certified units/sales
New Zealand (RMNZ)	Gold	15,000^{‡}
United States (RIAA)	Gold	500,000^{‡}
^{‡} Sales+streaming figures based on certification alone.

== Release history ==
Release dates and formats for "Renegade"
Region	Date	Format(s)	Version	Label	Ref.
Various	July 2, 2021	Digital download; streaming	Standard	37D03D; Jagjaguwar	
Italy	July 2, 2021	Radio airplay	Standard	Goodfellas	
United States	July 2, 2021	Triple A radio	Standard	37D03D; Jagjaguwar	
United States	July 12, 2021	Adult contemporary radio	Standard	Secretly Group; Jagjaguwar; 37D03D	
United States	July 13, 2021	Contemporary hit radio	Standard	Secretly Group; Jagjaguwar; 37D03D	
Various	August 17, 2021	Digital download; streaming	Pop	37D03D; Jagjaguwar	
