= Betty (Taylor Swift song) =

2020 single by Taylor Swift

- Live version cover artwork

Single by Taylor Swift

from the album Folklore
- Released: August 17, 2020
- Studio: Kitty Committee (Los Angeles); Long Pond (Hudson Valley)
- Genre: Country; folk rock; guitar pop
- Length: 4:54
- Label: Republic
- Songwriters: Taylor Swift; William Bowery (Note: In the liner notes of Folklore, Alwyn is credited as William Bowery (writer) and is uncredited as producer.)
- Producers: Taylor Swift; Jack Antonoff; Aaron Dessner

Taylor Swift singles chronology
"Exile" (2020)	"Betty" (2020)	"Willow" (2020)

Lyric video
- "Betty" on YouTube

"Betty" is a song by the American singer-songwriter Taylor Swift from her eighth studio album, Folklore (2020). It was written by Swift and Joe Alwyn (under the pseudonym William Bowery), and the former produced the track with Aaron Dessner and Jack Antonoff. MCA Nashville and Republic Records released the song to US country radio on August 17, 2020. "Betty" is an Americana-inspired song combining country, folk rock, and guitar pop. Its production consists of a harmonica, a pedal steel, guitars, and a key change after the bridge.

The lyrics are about a relationship between two fictitious characters named James and Betty. Some media publications initially interpreted the song in a queer context due to the lyrics not mentioning James's gender, but Swift stated that James is a 17-year-old boy. Narrated from his perspective, "Betty" is about his apology to Betty after having cheated on her. They are two of the three characters involved in a love triangle depicted in three Folklore tracks, the other two being "Cardigan" (from Betty's perspective) and "August" (from the remaining unnamed character's perspective).

Music critics viewed "Betty" as a throwback to Swift's early country-music songs. Many praised its engaging storytelling and commended how her songwriting matured over the course of her career. "Betty" peaked at number six on Hot Country Songs and number 42 on the Billboard Hot 100. It peaked within the top 40 on singles charts in Australia, Canada, and Singapore. The single was certified gold by Music Canada (MC) and the British Phonographic Industry (BPI). Swift performed "Betty" live at the 55th Academy of Country Music Awards on September 16, 2020. The performance was recorded, and released on digital music platforms two days later. The song was included on the set list of the Eras Tour (2023–2024).

== Background and release ==
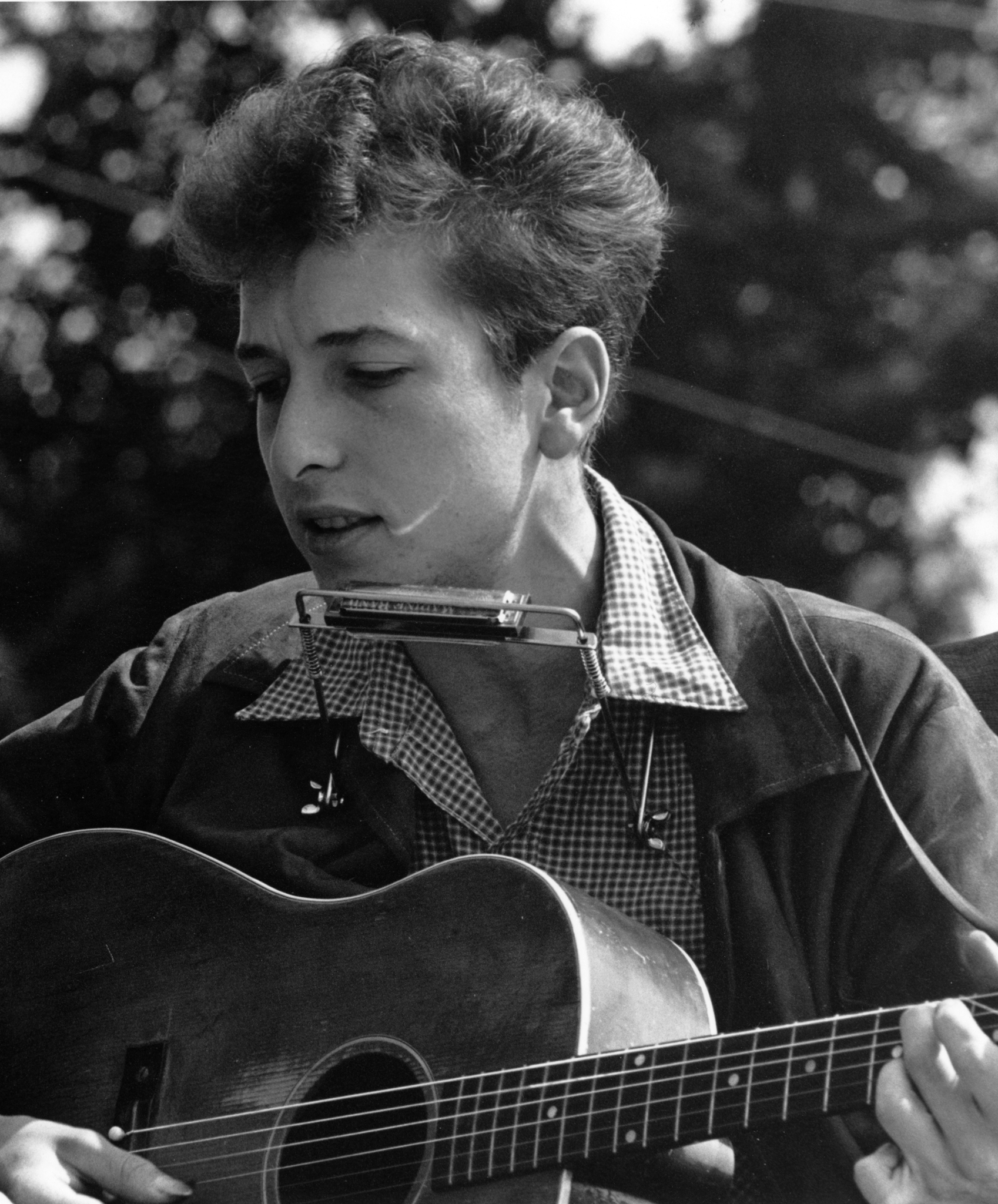
The production of "Betty" was inspired by two of Bob Dylan's 1960s albums.

The American singer-songwriter Taylor Swift conceived her eighth studio album, Folklore, while quarantining amidst the COVID-19 pandemic, with the producers Jack Antonoff and Aaron Dessner of the National. "Betty" is the only song on Folklore produced by both Antonoff and Dessner. For the song's sound, Swift used Bob Dylan's albums The Freewheelin' Bob Dylan (1963) and John Wesley Harding (1967) as reference points. The song features a co-writing credit from Swift's partner at the time, the English actor Joe Alwyn, who was initially credited under the pseudonym William Bowery. She stated that, one day, she heard Alwyn "singing the entire, fully formed chorus... from another room" and asked if they could write a song together while in quarantine, which eventually became "Betty". Swift cited Patty Griffin's "Top of the World" (2004) as her inspiration to write from a male perspective.

Antonoff, Dessner, alongside the engineers Jonathan Low and Laura Sisk, recorded "Betty" at Kitty Committee Studio (Swift's home studio in Los Angeles) and Long Pond Studio (Dessner's studio in Hudson Valley, New York). The instruments were recorded at Hook & Fade Studios in East Williamsburg, New York, Pleasure Hill Recording in Portland, Maine, and Rough Customer Studio in Brooklyn. Serban Ghenea mixed the track at MixStar Studios in Virginia Beach, Virginia. Swift surprise-released Folklore on July 24, 2020. In the primer that preceded the release, Swift teased imageries of various tracks, with "Betty" being about "a seventeen-year-old standing on a porch, learning to apologize". On August 17, 2020, Republic Records and MCA Nashville released the track to US country radio as a single.

== Composition and lyrics ==
"Betty"
"Betty" combines country, folk rock, and guitar pop, with a production propelled by guitars, a pedal steel, and an interlacing harmonica. A fictional narrative involving imagined characters, the song sees James apologizing to Betty for his unfaithfulness.

"Betty" runs for four minutes and 54 seconds. An Americana-influenced song, it features a production that critics described as reminiscent of Swift's early country-music albums. They pointed to the use of guitars, a pedal steel, and an interlacing harmonica. (Note: As described by Time's Raisa Bruner, the Los Angeles Times' Mikael Wood, Pitchfork's Vrinda Jagota, and The New York Times' Jon Caramanica) Hannah Mylrea of NME commented the track combines country with folk rock, the genre that Taila Lee from the Recording Academy also associated "Betty" with. Other reviewers described the genre as guitar pop, and 1990s alternative pop. The song incorporates a key change after the bridge. Critics likened "Betty" to the songs of other musicians. Vulture's Justin Curto said it harkens back to the guitar-pop sound of the alternative rock band Sixpence None the Richer in the 1990s, whereas Rob Sheffield of Rolling Stone compared the harmonica solo to that in Bruce Springsteen's 1975 song "Thunder Road".

As with other Folklore tracks, "Betty" features vivid storytelling. It is one of the three tracks that depict a fictitious "teenage love triangle", the other two being "Cardigan" and "August". They narrate the story line from the perspectives of each of the characters involved, at different times in their lives. "Betty" is narrated from the perspective of James, who cheated on the titular character Betty, as he involves himself in a "summer fling" with the unnamed female narrator of "August". Therefore, James "show[s] up" at Betty's party to reconcile with her. He apologizes about his past mistakes but does not fully own up to them, citing his disdain of crowds and Betty's "wandering eye" as excuses. Swift explained that James "has lost the love of his life basically and doesn't understand how to get it back".

The lyrical structure of "Betty" is characterized by a dramatic shift from the conditional ("If I just showed up at your party/Would you have me?") to the present ("I showed up at your party/Will you have me?"). Inez is an additional character named in the song, who is portrayed as a gossip. James confesses that, even though Betty does not usually believe Inez because her gossips are mostly false, Inez is right this time about him. The characters—James, Betty and Inez—are named after the daughters of the actors Ryan Reynolds and Blake Lively. References to a porch and a cardigan at the end of "Betty" echo the imagery in "Cardigan". Although Swift explicitly stated that James is a 17-year-old boy, due to the lack of mention of James's gender anywhere in the album, some audience interpreted "Betty" in a queer context. When Dessner was asked about the song's potential queerness, he replied: "I can't speak to what it's about. I have my own ideas. I also know where Taylor's heart is, and I think that's great anytime a song takes on greater meaning for anyone."

== Critical reception ==
Music critics gave "Betty" positive reviews. Many complimented Swift's songwriting as intricate and vivid (Note: Attributed to Pitchfork's Jillian Mapes, The Atlantic's Spencer Kornharber, Entertainment Weekly's Allaire Nuss, and Billboard's Jason Lipshutz) and noted how it matured since her early teenage works. (Note: Attributed to Jagota, Country Universe's Kephart Zachary, and Slant Magazine's Eric Mason) For Variety's Chris Willman and Esquire's Dave Holmes, the song exemplifies Folklore's fictional narratives departing from Swift's previously known autobiographical songwriting; the latter deemed it the album's centerpiece. Rob Sheffield of Rolling Stone said that "Betty", alongside the two other tracks also addressing the fictional love triangle narrative, constituted Folklore's three best songs. The Atlantic's critic Spencer Kornhaber lauded how the "suspenseful" storytelling made him "stand up and put [his] hands on [his] head while waiting for it to end". Finn McRedmond of The Irish Times praised the narrative of "Betty" as captivating as a feature film and wrote that by the end of the track, "only then do you realise how catchy the melody is". Rob Harvilla of The Ringer thought "Betty" "will remind you how sensitive and sly a songwriter she is and has always been".

Ellen Johnson of Paste named the track as one of the best country songs of 2020, stating that it proves Swift's empathy "truly knows no bounds", being written from the point of view of a "regretful" teenage boy. In The New York Times's individual critics' lists of the best 2020 songs, "Betty" was included on such lists by Jon Caramanica and Lindsay Zoladz. The Tampa Bay Times featured the track on their list of the 30 best songs of 2020. At the 2021 BMI London Awards, "Betty" won an award for "Most Performed Songs of the Year", marking Alwyn's first BMI win.

== Commercial performance ==
After Folklore was released, on the Billboard charts dated August 8, 2020, "Betty" debuted at number six on Hot Country Songs and number 42 on the Billboard Hot 100. It is Swift's 22nd to reach the top ten on Hot Country Songs and marked the highest debut for a woman since Bebe Rexha's "Meant to Be" (2017). The song debuted at number 60 on the Country Airplay chart, marking Swift's 36th entry. On country-music charts, "Betty" opened at number one on Country Streaming Songs and number 15 on Country Digital Song Sales. After its country-radio single release on August 17, 2020, it was the most added track of the week on Mediabase-monitored country radio stations.

Elsewhere, "Betty" peaked on singles charts of Australia (22), Canada (32), Singapore (22), Scotland (58), and Ireland (88). In the United Kingdom, "Betty" reached the OCC's Singles Downloads Chart (92), and Audio Streaming Chart (46), and was certified gold by the British Phonographic Industry. The single was additionally certified gold by Music Canada (MC). Following the inauguration of the Billboard Global 200 chart, "Betty" appeared at number 180 on the chart dated September 19, 2020.

== Live performances ==
Swift performed "Betty" live at the 55th Academy of Country Music Awards at the Grand Ole Opry House on September 16, 2020, marking Swift's first performance at a country-music show in seven years. Seated in front of a glowing stage light, she performed the clean version on a black Gibson acoustic guitar and was accompanied by one harmonica player. Sheffield said the live version was "an arena-rock blast". Swift wore a burgundy sequined turtleneck and khaki pants. The live version was released onto music streaming and digital platforms on September 18, 2020. Swift auctioned off the Gibson guitar, which she autographed, at Christie's auction house, as part of Academy of Country Music's COVID-19 relief fund. On her sixth headlining tour, the Eras Tour (2023–2024), Swift added "Betty" to the regular set list. In the 2024 leg of the tour, the second verse was omitted.

== Credits and personnel ==
Credits are adapted from the album liner note.

- Taylor Swift – vocals, songwriter, producer
- Joe Alwyn – songwriter
- Aaron Dessner – producer, recording engineer, percussion, piano, bass, high string guitar, electric guitar
- Jack Antonoff – producer, recording engineer, drums, percussion, bass, electric guitar, acoustic guitar, organ, Mellotron
- Josh Kaufman – recording engineer, harmonica, electric guitar, lap steel
- Laura Sisk – recording engineer
- Jonathan Low – recording engineer
- Serban Ghenea – mixer
- John Hanes – engineer
- John Rooney – assistant engineer
- Randy Merrill – mastering engineer
- Mikey Freedom Hart – Mellotron, pedal steel, Wurlitzer, harpsichord, vibraphone, electric guitar
- Evan Smith – saxophones, clarinet

== Charts ==
=== Weekly charts ===
Weekly chart performance for "Betty"
Chart (2020)	Peak position
Australia (ARIA)	22
Canada Hot 100 (Billboard)	32
Global 200 (Billboard)	180
Ireland (IRMA)	88
Portugal (AFP)	150
Scottish Singles Sales (Official Charts)	58
Singapore (RIAS)	22
UK Singles Downloads (Official Charts)	92
UK Audio Streaming (Official Charts)	46
US Billboard Hot 100	42
US Country Airplay (Billboard)	32
US Hot Country Songs (Billboard)	6
US Rolling Stone Top 100	19

=== Year-end charts ===
Year-end chart performance for "Betty"
Chart (2020)	Position
US Hot Country Songs (Billboard)	76

== Certifications ==
Certifications for "Betty"
Region	Certification	Certified units/sales
Australia (ARIA)	Platinum	70,000^{‡}
Brazil (Pro-Música Brasil)	Platinum	40,000^{‡}
Canada (Music Canada)	Gold	40,000^{‡}
New Zealand (RMNZ)	Platinum	30,000^{‡}
United Kingdom (BPI)	Gold	400,000^{‡}
^{‡} Sales+streaming figures based on certification alone.

== Release history ==
Release dates and formats for "Betty"
Region	Date	Format(s)	Version	Label(s)	Ref.
United States	August 17, 2020	Country radio	Original	Republic; MCA Nashville	
Various	September 18, 2020	Digital download; streaming	Live from 2020 ACM	Republic	
