= August (song) =

2020 song by Taylor Swift

Song by Taylor Swift

from the album Folklore
- Released: July 24, 2020
- Studio: Kitty Committee (Los Angeles); Rough Customer (Brooklyn) (Note: The song was recorded at Kitty Committee and Rough Customer studios; mixed at Long Pond studio in Hudson Valley, New York; and mastered at Sterling Sound studio in New York City. Instruments were recorded at Rough Customer, Long Pond, Pleasure Hill Recording in Portland, Maine, and Sound House Recording in Lakeland, Florida.)
- Genre: Dream pop; guitar pop; soft rock
- Length: 4:21
- Label: Republic
- Songwriters: Taylor Swift; Jack Antonoff
- Producers: Taylor Swift; Jack Antonoff; Joe Alwyn (Note: In the liner notes of Folklore, only Swift and Antonoff are credited as producers. The Recording Academy recognized Alwyn as the track's co-producer after Folklore won Album of the Year at the 63rd Annual Grammy Awards.)

Lyric video
- "August" on YouTube

"August" is a song by the American singer-songwriter Taylor Swift from her eighth studio album, Folklore (2020). Swift and Jack Antonoff wrote the song, and the two produced it with Joe Alwyn.

"August" is a ballad that combines dream pop, guitar pop, and soft rock. It features a dense reverb and an orchestration of strings and keyboards. The lyrics are told from the perspective of a female character (Augustine) who yearns for the 17-year-old boy James; he abandons her after a brief summer romance and reconciles with his former lover Betty. The narrative of "August" forms a love triangle depicted in three Folklore tracks, the other two being "Cardigan" (from Betty's perspective) and "Betty" (from James's perspective).

Music critics lauded the cinematic production and storytelling of "August", with some deeming it a highlight of Folklore and Swift's discography. A seasonal success that resurges in popularity around August each year, the track peaked at number 46 on the Billboard Global 200 and in the top 40 of the charts in Australia, Canada, Ireland, Malaysia, and Singapore, and the United States. Swift performed "August" live at the 63rd Annual Grammy Awards in 2021 and on her sixth concert tour, the Eras Tour, in 2023–2024.

== Background and production ==
Taylor Swift and the producer Jack Antonoff had written and produced songs for Swift's previous studio albums 1989 (2014), Reputation (2017), and Lover (2019). They collaborated again on Folklore, which Swift surprise-released amid the COVID-19 pandemic in 2020. Folklore was released on July 24, 2020, through Republic Records. Swift wrote or co-wrote all songs on the album, and Swift and Antonoff produced six, including "August". For the song, Antonoff produced the instrumental first, and sent it to Swift who wrote the lyrics "on the spot; it just was an intuitive thing". As with other tracks of Folklore, Swift created "August" based on a fictional narrative with imagined story arcs and characters.

== Lyrics and composition ==
Swift wrote "August" as part of three Folklore songs (together with "Cardigan" and "Betty") that explore a love triangle between James, Betty, and the unnamed female narrator of "August". It was the first song of the three that Swift wrote. According to Swift, she wanted to explore the idea of a girl in an undefined relationship: the lyrics are in the viewpoint of "August", who falls in love with James, who is already in a relationship with someone else. The song was inspired by what Swift described as the image of "the sun drenched month of August, sipped away like a bottle of wine". Throughout the song, imagery of late summer is prevalent: "Your back beneath the sun / Wishing I could write my name on it." Set in a suburban area with "salt air", "August" captures feelings of a teenage girl who goes through an unrequited love in the summer. She naively believes that she is in love, pondering on her summer romance: "August sipped away like a bottle of wine / Because you were never mine."

"August"
A dream pop song, "August" is accompanied by vocal reverberation, guitars, minimal synthesizers, and lush strings. In the lyrics, an unnamed teenage protagonist grieves a summer romance with a love interest whom "wasn't [hers] to lose".

While the narrators of "Cardigan" and "Betty" are explicitly named, the narrator of "August" is never mentioned by name, which Vulture's Nate Jones considered a highlight of her "relative unimportance in her lover's life". Swift said that she did not determine a name for the protagonist of "August", calling her "Augusta" or "Augustine" inside her head. As the summer romance progresses, the narrator is portrayed as unassertive and inexperienced, recalling the times when she "canceled my plans just in case you'd call". Though she knows she and James will never become a couple, she tells herself that it was enough "to live for the hope of it all". She attempts to run away with James: "Remember when I pulled up and said 'Get in the car' / And then canceled my plans just in case you'd call?" Finally, when the summer ends, so does the romance, and the narrator is left with a revelation: "You weren't mine to lose." Swift explained that after this summer romance, James and Betty later return to each other, while the "August" protagonist mourns the summer fling which she considered love.

Compared to the overarching folk sound of Folklore, "August" displays a more pop-oriented production. Aaron Dessner, a producer on Folklore, characterized it as the album's "closest thing to a pop song. It gets loud. It has this shimmering summer haze to it." Musically, "August" is a gloomy dream pop, guitar pop, and soft rock ballad incorporating 1990s-influenced guitars and vocal reverberation. Its guitar arrangements are soft rock oriented. In The A.V. Club, Annie Zaleski noted the song features "shivering" string instruments, keyboards, and minimal synthesizers, and "subtle splotchy grooves". Writing for The Guardian, Laura Snapes wrote: "Her vocal trademarks remain in the yo-yoing vocal yelps." The outro of "August" is a "full orchestra major chord climax" according to Lucy Harbron of Clash.

== Commercial performance ==
Upon the release of Folklore, "August" debuted on various singles charts worldwide. In the United States, the song entered at number 23 on the Billboard Hot 100 chart dated August 8, 2020. It charted on the Hot 100 for two consecutive weeks. The song simultaneously debuted and peaked at number five on the Billboard Hot Rock & Alternative Songs, where it stayed for 20 weeks on the chart. "August" experienced a 39 percent gain in streams in the US in August 2021. In 2022, the song resurged once again the same month, with its daily streams increasing 277 percent. Billboard called it Swift's "seasonal streaming perennial" similar to Mariah Carey's "All I Want for Christmas Is You" (1994).

"August" peaked within the top 20 on singles charts of Malaysia (11), Singapore (12), Australia (13), and Canada (16), upon release. Since its release, the song has experienced resurgence in streams and on charts during August and inspired internet memes. In 2022, it appeared on singles charts of the Philippines (number seven), Indonesia (number 17), and Vietnam (number 85), and reached new peaks in Ireland (number 38) and the United Kingdom (number 78). The following year, the track appeared on the Billboard Malaysian chart and reached a new peak at number 46 on the Billboard Global 200.

== Live performances ==
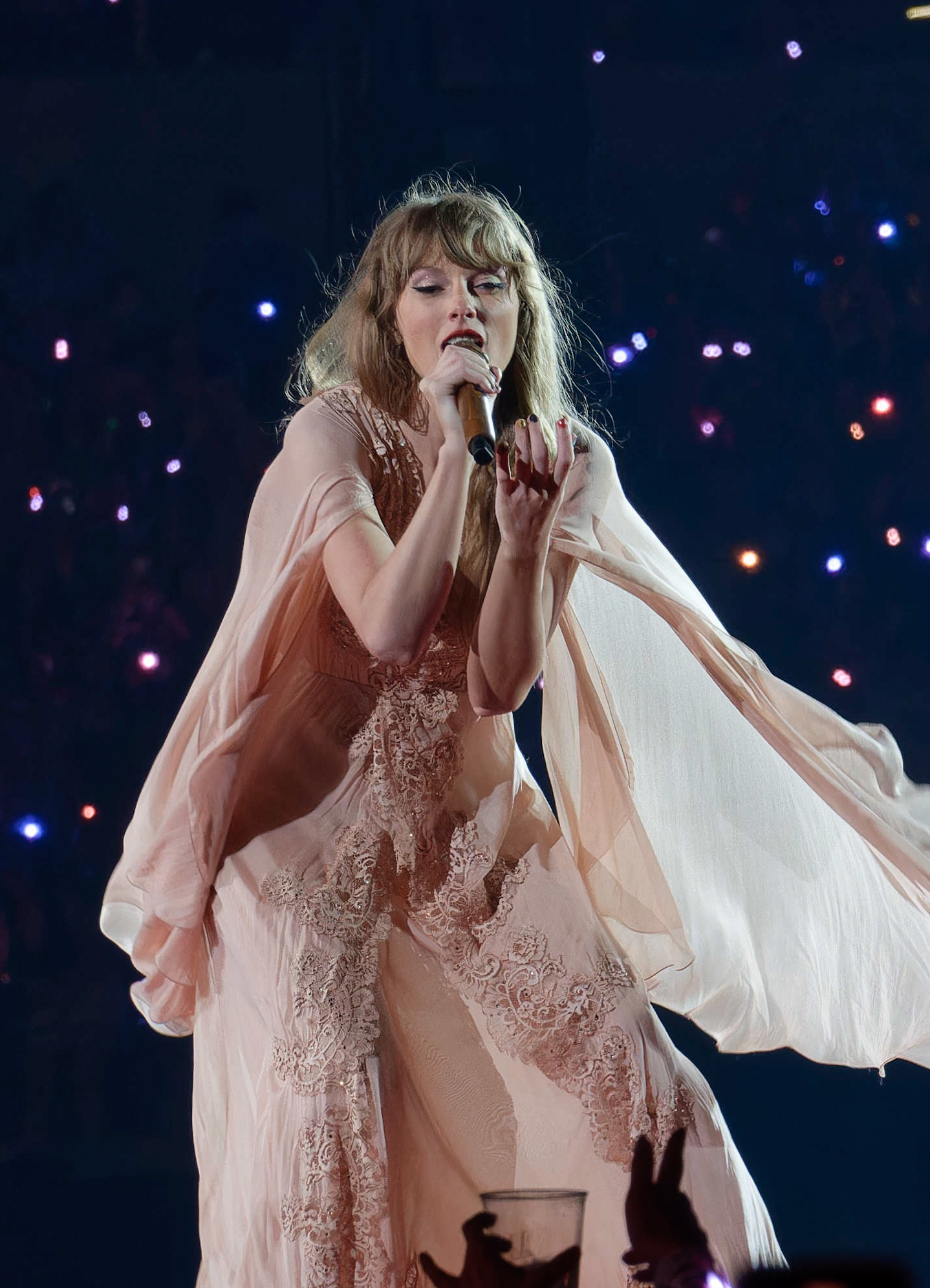
Swift performing "August" during the Eras Tour in 2023

At the 63rd Annual Grammy Awards on March 14, 2021, Swift performed "August" as part of a medley with "Cardigan" and "Willow", the latter was taken from her album Evermore (2020). The performance was accompanied by the Folklore producers Jack Antonoff and Aaron Dessner, marking the first time the three performed together. She began with "Cardigan", singing while laying atop a cottage, before performing "August" on a guitar inside the cottage, accompanied by instruments from Antonoff and Dessner. The trio then stepped outside the cottage to perform the last song, "Willow". The music journalist Rob Sheffield ranked Swift's performance first on his list of the "10 Reasons We Loved the 2021 Grammys." Rolling Stone critic Rob Sheffield also listed it as one of the five "classic" Grammy performances of all time.

"August" was included as part of the Folklore act on the set list for the Eras Tour (2023–2024). During the concerts, she sang the song and other Folklore tracks while dressing in a frilly gown that complements the album's cottagecore aesthetic. In 2026, she performed the song as part of a piano medley with "I Knew It, I Knew You" (2026) and "All Too Well (10 Minute Version)" (2021) at the Grammy Museum in Los Angeles.

== Critical reception ==
Critics praised the song's production and Swift's songwriting, and opined that the perspective of its lyrics—a departure from Swift's trademark confessional narratives inspired by her personal life—showcased her maturity as a songwriter. Valerie Magan from Clash remarked that the lyrics feel "vouyeristic, as we lean in to hear all the stories that 'innocent-era' Swift would've kept secret". The same magazine's Lucy Harbron lauded Swift's ability to portray "niche" emotions and her storytelling prowess.

Music journalist Jody Rosen, in a review for the Los Angeles Times, appreciated the shift from "pure first-person subjectivity" to fictional narratives. Sheffield picked "August" as one of the album's highlights, calling the song "the album's most plainly beautiful ballad". He placed it fifth on his 2021 ranking of all the 199 songs of Swift's discography. Ellen Johnson from Paste labeled the track one of the best in Swift's discography as well.

The A.V. Club's Annie Zaleski and Under the Radar's Caleb Campbell both selected the song as one of Folklore's best and compared the production to the music by the Scottish dream pop band Cocteau Twins. The latter commented that the track serves as a testament to Swift's abilities of "writing the undeniably catchy hooks that make for a great pop song". While acknowledging Swift's indie reinvention on Folklore, Pitchfork's Jillian Mapes opined that "August", along with other songs produced by Antonoff, are not really radical transformations, however still display signs of maturity. On behalf of Consequence of Sound, Katie Moulton was somewhat disappointed that the song's theme is not far from Swift's trademark "pop-culture tropes", but found certain lyrics original enough to "refresh the clichés". The Observer's Kitty Empire was more reserved in her praise and said "August", although a solid song, did not expand beyond Swift's comfort zone.

"August" featured on lists of the best songs of 2020 by publications including Rolling Stone (No. 5), the Chicago Tribune (unranked), and Yahoo! (unranked). Complex's Edwin Ortiz ranked it second on his year-end list. In Vulture's list ranking all songs in Swift's discography, Jones wrote about "August": "Even in fiction, Swift's ability to capture the wistful ache of nostalgia remains unmatched." Sheffield picked it among the best five songs of Swift's discography: " 'August' feels like such a simple tune, yet it's one of the craftiest creations in the Swiftian Multiverse." Insider's Callie Ahlgrim named "August" as The Best Song of 2020.

== Credits and personnel ==
- Taylor Swift – vocals, songwriter, producer
- Jack Antonoff – producer, songwriter, recording, live drums, percussion programming, electric guitar, acoustic guitar
- Joe Alwyn – producer
- Evan Smith – saxophones, flute, electric guitar, keyboards
- Bobby Hawk – strings
- Laura Sisk – recording
- Mike Williams – string recording
- Jon Gautier – string recording
- Jonathan Low – mixing, synth bass, synth bass recording
- Randy Merrill – mastering

== Charts ==
=== Weekly charts ===
2020–2021 chart performance for "August"
Chart (2020–2021)	Peak position
Australia (ARIA)	13
Canada Hot 100 (Billboard)	19
Malaysia (RIM)	11
Portugal (AFP)	94
Singapore (RIAS)	12
Swedish Heatseekers (Sverigetopplistan)	9
US Billboard Hot 100	23
US Hot Rock & Alternative Songs (Billboard)	5
US Rolling Stone Top 100	8

2022–2024 chart performance for "August"
Chart (2022–2024)	Peak position
Global 200 (Billboard)	46
Greece International (IFPI)	76
Indonesia (Billboard)	17
Ireland (IRMA)	38
Malaysia (Billboard)	14
Philippines (Billboard)	7
Philippines (Philippines Hot 100)	20
Portugal (AFP)	171
UK Singles (Official Charts)	78
US Digital Song Sales (Billboard)	48
US Streaming Songs (Billboard)	47
Vietnam Hot 100 (Billboard)	85

=== Year-end charts ===
Year-end chart performance for "August"
Chart (2020)	Position
US Hot Rock & Alternative Songs (Billboard)	24

== Certifications ==
Certifications for "August"
Region	Certification	Certified units/sales
Australia (ARIA)	4× Platinum	280,000^{‡}
Brazil (Pro-Música Brasil)	2× Platinum	80,000^{‡}
Denmark (IFPI Danmark)	Gold	45,000^{‡}
France (SNEP)	Gold	100,000^{‡}
Italy (FIMI)	Gold	50,000^{‡}
New Zealand (RMNZ)	3× Platinum	90,000^{‡}
Poland (ZPAV)	Platinum	50,000^{‡}
Portugal (AFP)	Platinum	25,000^{‡}
Spain (Promusicae)	Platinum	60,000^{‡}
United Kingdom (BPI)	2× Platinum	1,200,000^{‡}
Streaming
Greece (IFPI Greece)	Gold	1,000,000^{†}
^{‡} Sales+streaming figures based on certification alone.^{†} Streaming-only figures based on certification alone.
