= Big Red Machine (album) =

Studio album by Big Red Machine
- Released: August 31, 2018
- Studios: Long Pond, Hudson Valley, New York
- Length: 46:51
- Label: Jagjaguwar
- Producers: Aaron Dessner; Justin Vernon; Brad Cook

Big Red Machine chronology
Big Red Machine (2018)	How Long Do You Think It's Gonna Last? (2021)

Big Red Machine is the debut studio album by American musicians Aaron Dessner and Justin Vernon as Big Red Machine. Dessner is most famous for being a founding member, instrumentalist, songwriter, and producer for The National, and Vernon for being the founding member and frontman of Bon Iver. The majority of the album was recorded in Dessner's shed studio in the Hudson Valley.

Professional ratings
Aggregate scores
Source	Rating
Metacritic	73/100
Review scores
Source	Rating
AllMusic	3.5/5 stars
Paste Magazine	8.8/10

== Track listing ==
No.	Title	Length
1.	"Deep Green"	4:01
2.	"Gratitude"	5:56
3.	"Lyla"	5:10
4.	"Air Stryp"	2:03
5.	"Hymnostic"	3:02
6.	"Forest Green"	5:49
7.	"OMDB"	7:42
8.	"People Lullaby"	5:23
9.	"I Won't Run from It"	3:38
10.	"Melt"	4:07

== Personnel ==
=== Musicians ===
- Aaron Dessner - drum machine, synthesizer, acoustic guitar, electric guitar, piano, mellotron, bass, songwriting, production
- Justin Vernon - vocals, electric guitar, bass, synthesizer, baritone guitar, songwriting, production
- Brad Cook - production, bass, omnichord, synthesizer

=== Additional musicians ===
- Jonathan Low - engineering
- JT Bates - drums (all tracks)
- Bryce Dessner - orchestration (6–8), electric guitar (7)
- Bryan Devendorf - drum machine (2–3, 6–7)
- Phoebe Bridgers - additional vocals (3)
- Kate Stables - additional vocals (5, 8–9)
- Richard Reed Parry - additional vocals (2, 5, 9)
- Lisa Hannigan - additional vocals (1, 3, 5, 8–10)
- Andrew Broder - additional vocals (3)
- Camilla Staveley-Taylor - additional vocals (3, 6)
- Emily Staveley-Taylor - additional vocals (3, 5, 8–10)
- Jessica Staveley-Taylor - additional vocals (3, 5, 8–10)
- Zoe Randell - additional vocals (8–10)
- Steve Hassett - additional vocals (8–10)

== Charts ==
Chart (2018)	Peak position
Belgian Albums (Ultratop Flanders)	16
Dutch Albums (Album Top 100)	80
Scottish Albums (Official Charts)	40
Swiss Albums (Schweizer Hitparade)	86
UK Albums (Official Charts)	96
UK Album Downloads (Official Charts)	44
UK Independent Albums (Official Charts)	18
US Heatseekers Albums (Billboard)	1
US Independent Albums (Billboard)	8
US Top Album Sales (Billboard)	34
US Top Alternative Albums (Billboard)	18
US Top Rock Albums (Billboard)	40
US Vinyl Albums (Billboard)	6
