= Dorothea (song) =

2020 song by Taylor Swift

Song by Taylor Swift

from the album Evermore
- Released: December 11, 2020
- Recorded: 2020
- Studio: Long Pond (Hudson Valley); Kitty Committee (Los Angeles)
- Genre: Americana; folk; country folk
- Length: 3:45
- Label: Republic
- Songwriters: Taylor Swift; Aaron Dessner
- Producer: Aaron Dessner

Lyric video
- "Dorothea" on YouTube

"Dorothea" is a song by the American singer-songwriter Taylor Swift from her ninth studio album, Evermore (2020). Swift wrote the song with its producer, Aaron Dessner. Musically, "Dorothea" combines Americana, folk, and country folk. Its production is driven by a honky-tonk piano, tambourine percussion, and guitars. In the lyrics, the narrator reminisces about an old friendship with Dorothea, who left their small hometown to pursue a Hollywood career when they were in their adolescence.

Music critics praised "Dorothea" for its soothing composition and lyrical imagery. Commercially, it peaked at number 47 on the Billboard Global 200 and reached the national charts of Australia, Canada, Portugal, and the United States. "Dorothea" received certifications in Australia, New Zealand, and the United Kingdom. Swift performed the track live twice on her sixth concert tour, the Eras Tour (2023–2024).

== Background and release ==
Following the critical and commercial success of her eighth studio album, Folklore (2020), Taylor Swift and the album's collaborators, including Aaron Dessner, assembled at Long Pond Studio in the Hudson Valley to film the documentary Folklore: The Long Pond Studio Sessions (2020). After filming, they celebrated Folklore's success and unexpectedly continued writing songs while staying at Long Pond. The result was Swift's ninth studio album, Evermore, which she described as a "sister record" to Folklore. "Dorothea" was one of two tracks that were initially written for Big Red Machine, a band consisting of Dessner and Justin Vernon; Dessner felt it was a continuation of the themes of Folklore, and it was eventually included on Evermore. "Dorothea" is the eighth track on the album, which was surprise-released on December 11, 2020. Swift played "Dorothea" for the first time on piano at the second show of the Eras Tour in Kansas City, Missouri, on July 8, 2023. She performed it on acoustic guitar as part of a mashup with her 2019 song "It's Nice to Have a Friend" at the third Edinburgh show of the tour on June 9, 2024.

== Production and composition ==
Swift wrote "Dorothea" with Dessner, who produced the track and recorded it at Long Pond with the mixer Jonathan Low. Greg Calbi and Steve Fallone mastered it at Sterling Sound Studios in Edgewater, New Jersey, and Laura Sisk recorded Swift's vocals at Kitty Committee Studio in Los Angeles. Dessner played bass guitar, electric guitar, acoustic guitar, piano, and tambourine. Other musicians who played instruments include JT Bates (drum kit, percussion), Thomas Bartlett (piano, keyboards, synthesizers), Josh Kaufman (electric guitar, acoustic guitar), and Benjamin Lanz (modular synth).

"Dorothea"
A sample of the refrain of "Dorothea", featuring a honky-tonk piano, Swift's lower vocal register, and lyrics about reflecting on a past friendship

"Dorothea" is three minutes and forty-five seconds long. Music journalists identified it as an Americana, folk, and country folk song, instrumented by a honky-tonk piano, tambourine percussion, guitars, and a "whirling" acoustic arrangement. Swift sings with her lower vocal register during the refrain. NME's Hannah Mylrea thought that the vocal melodies were reminiscent of her debut studio album, Taylor Swift (2006).

Lyrically, "Dorothea" and the fellow album track "'Tis the Damn Season" revolve around a fictional story set in Tupelo, Mississippi. The narrative of "Dorothea" consists of two characters, Dorothea and the narrator, who were childhood friends until Dorothea moved to Los Angeles to pursue a Hollywood career. The narrator expresses her happiness for Dorothea's success and that she will always support her ("You're a queen, selling dreams/ Selling make up and magazines/ From you I'd buy anything"). She reminisces about her memories with her, such as a skipped prom and feelings of separation. In the refrain, the narrator convinces herself that Dorothea was happier in the small town and she might return one day ("It's never too late to come back to my side/ The stars in your eyes shined brighter in Tupelo/ And if you're ever tired of being known for who you know/ You know, you'll always know me").

== Critical reception ==
Music critics praised "Dorothea" for its soothing composition and lyrical imagery. Brodie Lancaster of The Sydney Morning Herald dubbed it a "masterwork of a character study", and Deborah Krieger of PopMatters considered it the highlight of Evermore and an "immediate classic". The latter lauded the soothing nature of the song, and Paste's Ellen Johnson similarly praised the soft electronic composition and the "carefully crafted" lyrical imagery. The Guardian's Alexis Petridis commended the melody as "luminous" and believed that "Dorothea" succeeded in reversing the "old country cliché" of a celebrity saying that their life of fame pales in comparison to the coziness of their small hometown. Rolling Stone's Rob Sheffield considered it a "hidden sequel" to Swift's 2020 song "The Lakes" and picked "The stars in your eyes shined brighter in Tupelo" as his favorite lyric from the track. "Dorothea" appeared in rankings of Swift's discography by Vulture's Nate Jones (89 out of 245) and Sheffield (166 out of 286).

== Commercial performance ==
"Dorothea" debuted at number 47 on the Billboard Global 200 chart dated December 26, 2020. In the United States, it reached number 13 on the Billboard Hot Rock & Alternative Songs chart, number 40 on the Rolling Stone Top 100 chart, and number 67 on the Billboard Hot 100 chart. "Dorothea" peaked at number 34 in Canada, number 47 in Australia, and number 173 in Portugal. In the United Kingdom, the track reached number 74 on the Audio Streaming chart. "Dorothea" was certified gold in Australia and New Zealand, and silver in the United Kingdom.

== Personnel ==
Credits are adapted from the liner notes of Evermore.

- Taylor Swift – vocals, songwriter
- Aaron Dessner – producer, songwriter, recording engineer, bass guitar, electric guitar, acoustic guitar, piano, tambourine
- Jonathan Low – recording engineer, mixer
- Laura Sisk – vocal recording engineer
- Greg Calbi – mastering engineer
- Steve Fallone – mastering engineer
- JT Bates – drum kit, percussion
- Thomas Bartlett – piano, keyboards, synthesizers
- Josh Kaufman – electric guitar, acoustic guitar
- Benjamin Lanz – modular synth

== Charts ==
Weekly chart performance of "Dorothea"
Chart (2020)	Peak position
Australia (ARIA)	47
Canada Hot 100 (Billboard)	34
Global 200 (Billboard)	47
Portugal (AFP)	173
UK Audio Streaming (Official Charts)	74
US Billboard Hot 100	67
US Hot Rock & Alternative Songs (Billboard)	13
US Rolling Stone Top 100	40

== Certifications ==
Certifications for "Dorothea"
Region	Certification	Certified units/sales
Australia (ARIA)	Gold	35,000^{‡}
New Zealand (RMNZ)	Gold	15,000^{‡}
United Kingdom (BPI)	Silver	200,000^{‡}
^{‡} Sales+streaming figures based on certification alone.
