= Big Red Machine (band) =

American indie music band

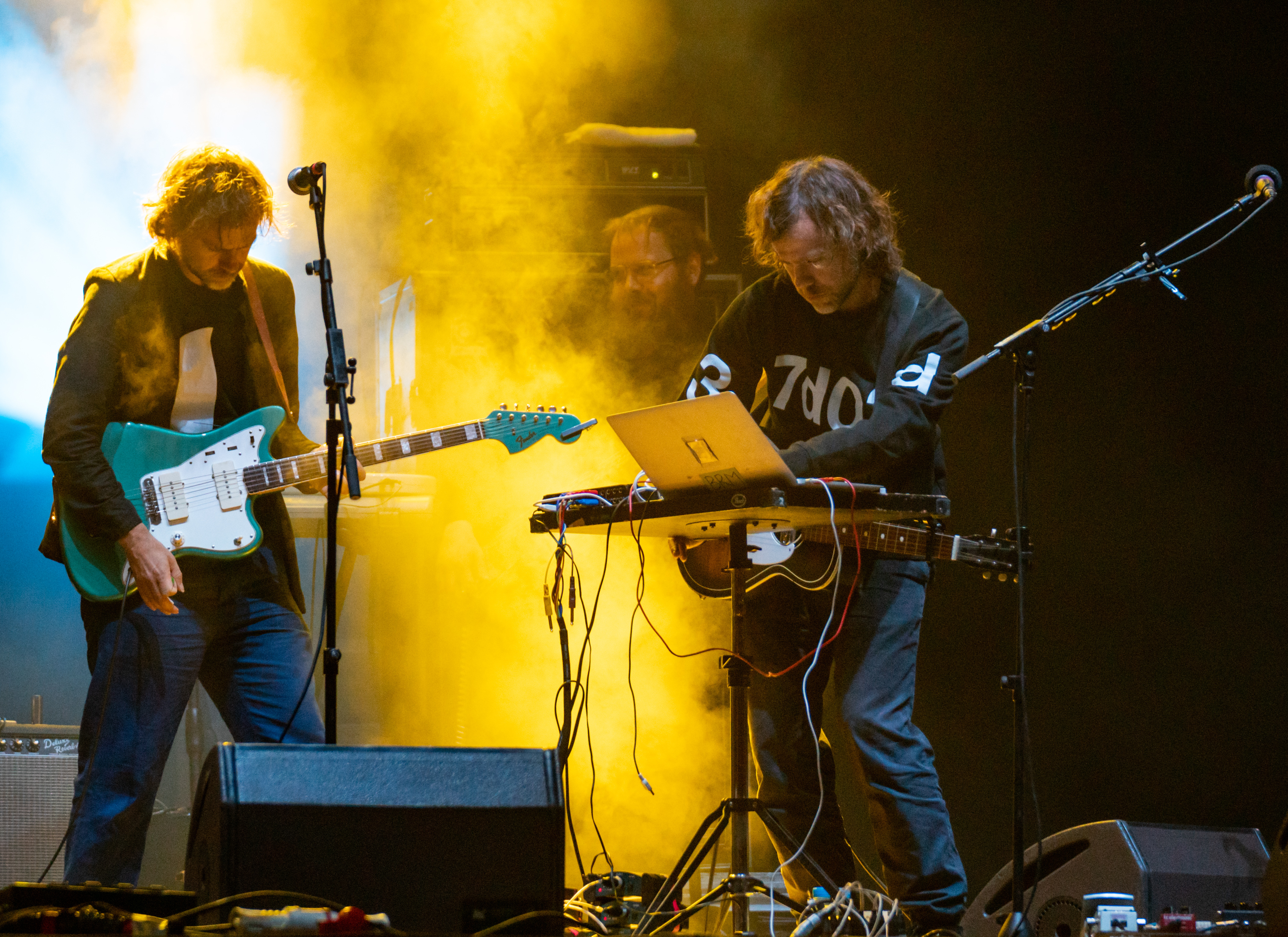
- Big Red Machine performing in 2019

Background information
- Origin: Eau Claire, Wisconsin, US
- Genres: Indie folk; alternative rock; folktronica
- Years active: 2018–present
- Labels: Jagjaguwar
- Members: Aaron Dessner; Justin Vernon
- Website: bigredmachine.bandcamp.com

Big Red Machine is an American indie folk band that began as a collaboration between musicians Aaron Dessner and Justin Vernon. The band is named after the nickname for the dominant 1970s Cincinnati Reds baseball team, which won the 1976 World Series in Dessner's birth year.

== History ==
=== 2008–2016: Formation and beginnings ===
Big Red Machine began as a musical collaboration in 2008, when Aaron Dessner messaged Justin Vernon on MySpace, without any prior personal meeting. Dessner sent Vernon an instrumental idea for a compilation album named Dark Was the Night, benefiting the Red Hot Organization, which he wanted Vernon to write a song for. The sketch was titled "Big Red Machine", and Vernon created a completed song using the track. The album was celebrated with a show at Radio City Music Hall, where the two met and began further collaborating. Since then, they have worked on a number of projects together, including PEOPLE Collective, Eaux Claires Music & Arts Festival, and Day of the Dead. Dessner is most famous for being a founding member, songwriter, and producer for The National, and Vernon for being the leader of Bon Iver.

In 2016, Vernon, Dessner, and Dessner's twin brother Bryce Dessner founded an artist collective named PEOPLE. The PEOPLE website states that the concept aims to "establish an independent and nurturing space in which to make work (generally around music) that is collaborative, spontaneous and expressive in nature and where all unnecessary distractions or obstacles that get in the way are removed." They first gathered for a festival at Funkhaus Berlin in 2016. The second festival took place in 2018, again at Funkhaus. Since 2016, Big Red Machine has played festival sets at Eaux Claires, Haven, and Sounds From a Safe Harbour.

Dessner has stated that the original sketch that he sent to Vernon in 2008, named "Big Red Machine", uses the nickname of the 1970s Cincinnati Reds teams that won the World Series back to back in 1975 and 1976. The team received the nickname "The Big Red Machine" throughout this successful period. Aaron Dessner grew up in Cincinnati, and he and his twin brother were born in 1976, during the Reds' run.

=== 2018–2019: Big Red Machine ===
Big Red Machine released their debut album Big Red Machine on August 31, 2018, via PEOPLE and Jagjaguwar. Prior to this, the outfit released four tracks from the full-length album: "Gratitude", "Lyla", "Hymnostic", and "Forest Green". The 10-track self-titled album was co-produced by Dessner, Vernon, and Brad Cook, while Jonathan Low mixed the recording. The album features approximately 40 collaborators, including Bryce Dessner, Bryan Devendorf, Richard Parry, Phoebe Bridgers, Lisa Hannigan, JT Bates, and Kate Stables, among others. The majority of the album was recorded in Dessner's shed studio in the Hudson Valley, where Dessner also recorded the 2017 The National album Sleep Well Beast.

=== 2020–present: Taylor Swift collaborations and How Long Do You Think It's Gonna Last? ===
In 2020, it was announced that Dessner and Vernon had begun work on new Big Red Machine material. Early in the year, during the COVID-19 pandemic, Michael Stipe appeared on several late-night shows, premiering a new song called "No Time for Love Like Now". The song was revealed to be a Big Red Machine song, and the single, featuring Stipe on vocals, was released in June. Dessner also performed several unreleased Big Red Machine songs during an Instagram Live session. In April—December 2020, Dessner co-produced and co-wrote many tracks on Folklore and Evermore, the 2020 albums by American singer-songwriter Taylor Swift; Vernon also contributed vocals and instrumentation on some of the tracks. Dessner and Swift won Album of the Year for Folklore at the 63rd Annual Grammy Awards.

In August 2020, Dessner confirmed that Big Red Machine were finalizing and arranging new music for an upcoming album. Later that year, the band released two covers of Aimee Mann's "Wise Up" and collaborated with Sharon Van Etten on the reissue of her album Epic. Additionally, Vernon, in his "Visit with Vernon" web series, performed an unreleased Big Red Machine song called "Latter Days", that had previously also been performed by Dessner during his Instagram Live concert. "Latter Days" was co-written by Hadestown writer Anaïs Mitchell. In April 2021, Vernon teased a potential collaboration with Swift.

In June 2021, the band announced the upcoming release of their second album, How Long Do You Think It's Gonna Last?. In the week of the announcement, they released the singles "Latter Days" (featuring Mitchell), "The Ghost of Cincinnati", and "Renegade" (featuring Swift). The record came out on August 27, 2021.

== Discography ==
=== Studio albums ===
Title	Album details	Peak chart positions									
Title	Album details	US	AUS	BEL (FL)	BEL (WA)	GER	IRE	NL	SCO	SWI	UK
Big Red Machine	Released: August 31, 2018; Label: Jagjaguwar; Formats: Cassette, CD, LP, digital download, streaming	— (Note: Big Red Machine did not enter the Billboard 200, but did peak at number one on the US Heatseekers Albums chart.)	— (Note: Big Red Machine did not enter the Australian ARIA Albums Chart but peaked at number nine on the ARIA Hitseekers Chart.)	16	—	—	—	80	40	86	96
How Long Do You Think It's Gonna Last?	Released: August 27, 2021; Label: 37DO3D, Jagjaguwar; Formats: Cassette, CD, LP, digital download, streaming	82	51	9	179	18	66	17	15	88	45
"—" denotes a recording that did not chart or was not released in that territory.

=== Singles ===
Title	Year	Peak chart positions										Album
Title	Year	US	US Adult	US Rock	AUS	CAN	IRE	NZ Hot	UK	UK Indie	WW	Album
"No Time for Love Like Now" (featuring Michael Stipe)	2020	—	—	—	—	—	—	—	—	—	—	Non-album single
"Latter Days" (featuring Anaïs Mitchell)	2021	—	—	—	—	—	—	—	—	—	—	How Long Do You Think It's Gonna Last?
"The Ghost of Cincinnati"	2021	—	—	—	—	—	—	—	—	—	—	How Long Do You Think It's Gonna Last?
"Renegade" (featuring Taylor Swift)	2021	73	14	9	70	58	53	3	73	9	96	How Long Do You Think It's Gonna Last?
"Phoenix" (featuring Fleet Foxes and Anaïs Mitchell)	2021	—	—	— (Note: "Phoenix" did not enter the Hot Rock & Alternative Songs chart but did peak at number 33 on the US Triple A Airplay chart.)	—	—	—	—	—	—	—	How Long Do You Think It's Gonna Last?
"Mimi" (featuring Ilsey)	2021	—	—	—	—	—	—	—	—	—	—	How Long Do You Think It's Gonna Last?
"—" denotes a recording that did not chart or was not released in that territory.

=== Other charting songs ===
Title	Year	Peak chart positions			Album
Title	Year	US Alt. DL	US Rock DL	BEL (FL) Tip	Album
"I Won't Run from It"	2018	—	—	15	Big Red Machine
"Birch" (featuring Taylor Swift)	2021	17	17	—	How Long Do You Think It's Gonna Last?
"—" denotes a recording that did not chart or was not released in that territory.
