= Samuel Goldwyn Estate =

Detached house in Beverly Hills, Los Angeles

- Location within the Los Angeles metropolitan area

General information
- Type: House
- Architectural style: Georgian Revival
- Location: 1200 Laurel Lane, Beverly Hills, California, U.S.
- Coordinates: 34°5′16.4″N 118°24′52.4″W
- Construction started: 1934
- Owner: Taylor Swift

Technical details
- Floor area: 11,000 sq ft (1,000 m^{2})

Design and construction
- Architect: Douglas Honnold

The Samuel Goldwyn Estate is a house at 1200 Laurel Lane in Beverly Hills, California. It was designed by the American architects Douglas Honnold and George Vernon Russell for the Polish-American film producer Samuel Goldwyn and the American actress Frances Howard, finishing construction in 1934. The property was owned by the Goldwyn family until 2015, when it was purchased and subsequently renovated and restored by the American singer-songwriter Taylor Swift.

Goldwyn and Howard held several social gatherings at the house, with guests including Charlie Chaplin, Clark Gable, Frank Capra, Katharine Hepburn, Irving Berlin, Marlene Dietrich, Buster Keaton, Ginger Rogers, Jock Whitney, Lucille Ball, Eleanor Roosevelt, Norma Shearer, and Harpo Marx. The house was made a National Historic Landmark in 2017 and hosts Swift's recording studio, Kitty Committee Studio, set up in April 2020.

== Design ==
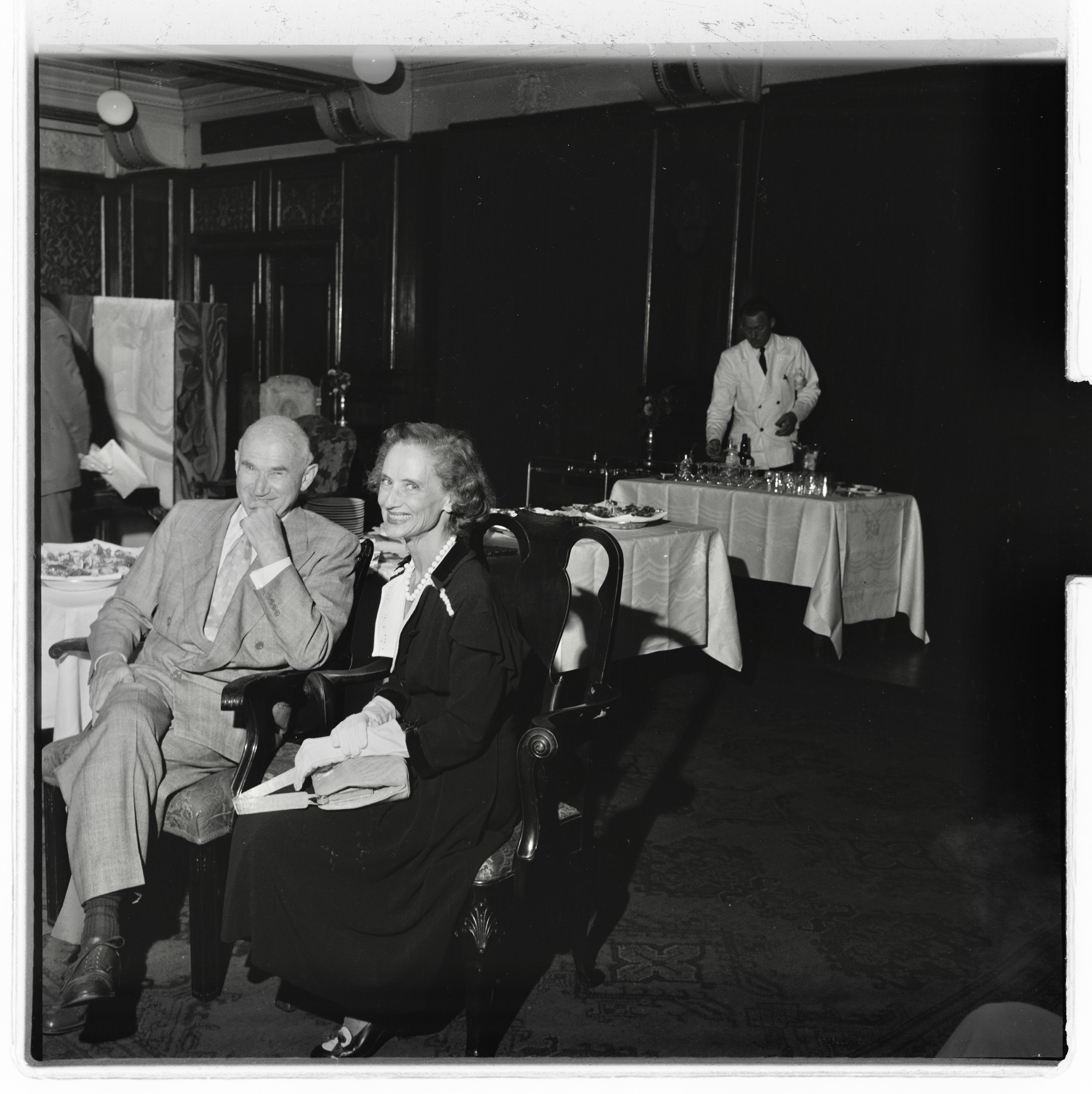
Goldwyn and Howard, original owners of the estate, in 1935

The house was designed by Douglas Honnold and George Vernon Russell in the Georgian Revival style. It was Honnold and Russell's first commission. The pair subsequently designed the Dolores del Río House for the actress Dolores Del Rio and her husband Cedric Gibbons in Pacific Palisades. The house is set over 11,000 sq ft (1,000 m^{2}) on two stories made of brick and rendered in stucco. A large foyer leads to the ground floor public rooms. The dining room had a table that could seat 20 guests.

The main lounge featured "heavy green drapery" and led to a small card room. The house has four bedrooms on the first floor, with the master bedroom suite on the second floor. A guest suite is situated above the garage. The paneled library was also used as a screening room, with the outer doors of the library leading to the large patio. The grounds of the house are set over terraces and include a swimming pool with accompanying cabana, a tool shed, and a tennis court.

Goldwyn's biographer A. Scott Berg describes the property as a "gleaming white house with black trim, its two wings forming a welcoming obtuse angle". Howard was given a free rein over the design and planning of the house from Goldwyn, with his only stipulation that the house be white. Another Goldwyn biographer, Carol Easton, felt that the design of the house with its strict formality and understated conservatism reflected Howard's understanding of Goldwyn's desire for status and respectability which he had sought since his arrival in the United States as an illiterate immigrant.

== History ==
=== Goldwyn family ===
The estate is one of three lots on Laurel Lane in Beverly Hills. Berg describes Laurel Lane as a "knoll off Coldwater Canyon". The first lot was occupied by film director Wesley Ruggles, and the second would remain unoccupied for several decades. The actress Frances Howard, Goldwyn's wife, noticed the available third lot of 2.5 acres (1.0 ha) and persuaded her husband to purchase it. Among the reasons that prompted the Goldwyns to move was the desirability and social cachet of the Beverly Hills address and the lack of a projector room in their West Hollywood house.

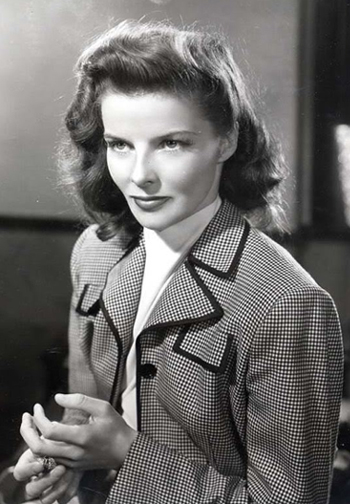
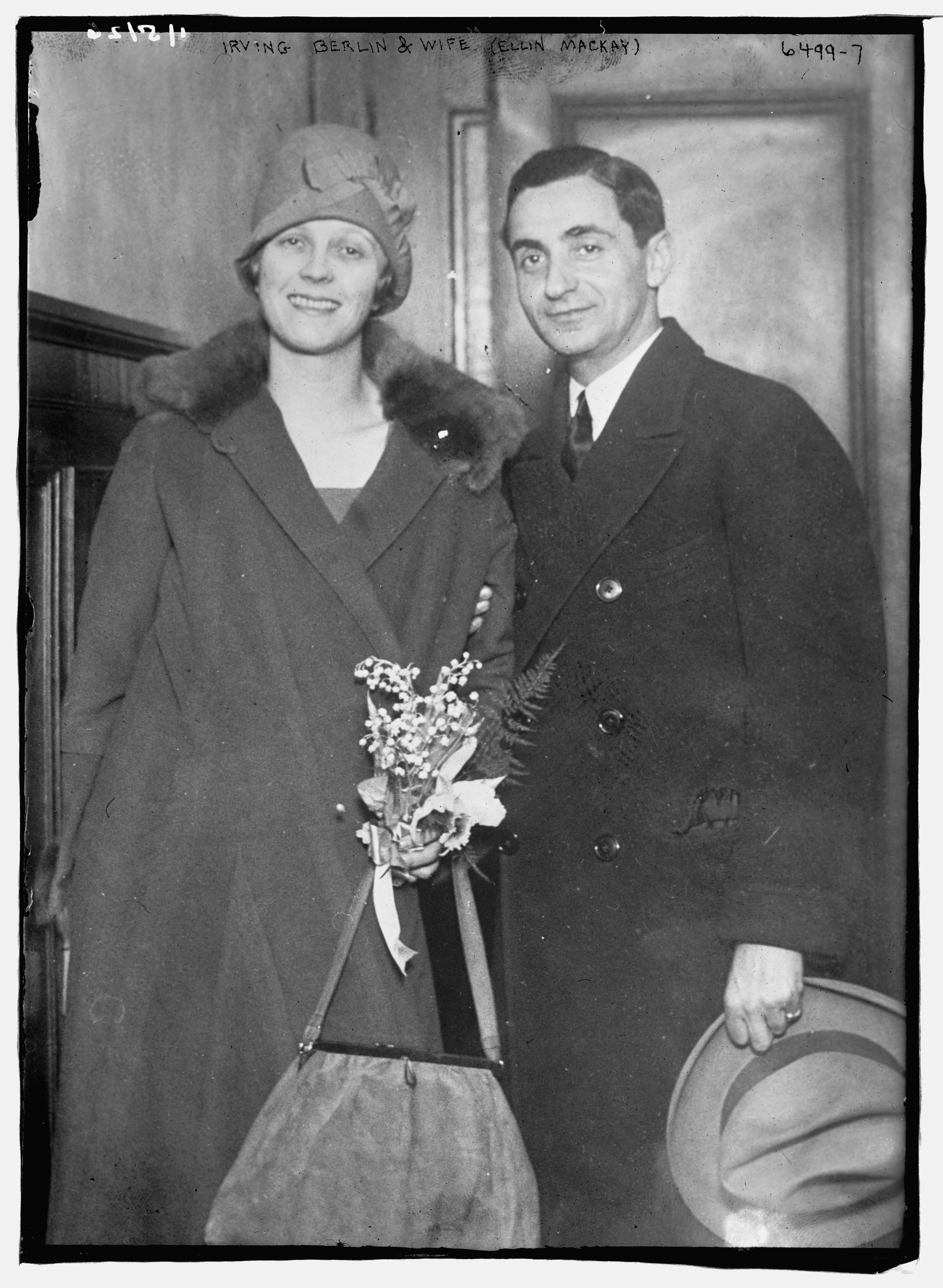
Actress Katharine Hepburn and composer Irving Berlin, alongside his wife, were frequent guests at Goldwyn's renowned dinner parties.

The house was built over two years by Richard Day and Alexander Gollitzen, with the interiors constructed by labourers from the Metro-Goldwyn-Mayer film studio. It was completed in November 1934. Goldwyn would frequently use the house as collateral to finance the production of his films. Goldwyn would walk the three miles from the house to work in Hollywood every day, down Laurel Lane and Sunset Boulevard to the border of Beverly Hills and West Hollywood, with his chauffeur following behind him. He would then be driven through Hollywood to the studio, with the journey being done in reverse at the end of the day. Goldwyn claimed that the steep walk up and down the hill every day kept him fit, exclaiming to associates that "You can just feel that oxygen going into your system!".

Howard would become noted for her social gatherings at the house, frequently hosting large parties honoring other notable spouses such as Irving Berlin and Ellin Mackay or Averell and Marie Norton Harriman. Attendance at Howard's dinner parties for twelve guests was described by George Cukor as the "hardest ticket in town", with Katharine Hepburn remarking, "You always knew where your career stood by your position at the Goldwyn table". Biographer Berg notes the Goldwyns' ability to draw entertainment personalities with their hosting of a dinner on New Year's Eve of 1935 for Cole Porter, Lady Mendl, and Gary Cooper and his wife, followed by a "champagne supper served at midnight" that was attended by Harold Arlen, Jack Benny, Charles Boyer, Frank Capra, Marlene Dietrich, Clark Gable, Howard Hawks, James Hilton, Sidney Howard, Myrna Loy, Ginger Rogers, David O. Selznick, Walter Wanger, Jock Whitney, Loretta Young, and an additional fifty guests. Lucille Ball ate her first artichoke at a dinner party and was mystified how to eat it until Harpo Marx showed her. Eleanor Roosevelt attended a small dinner party at the house prior to the premiere of Wuthering Heights with Norma Shearer and Merle Oberon.

Howard created a croquet pitch for Goldwyn's birthday in 1956, and he became an enthusiastic player, often inviting Mike Romanoff and others over for games. Goldwyn was presented with the Presidential Medal of Freedom by President Richard Nixon at the house in March 1971. As Nixon leaned in to put the medal around Goldwyn's neck, Goldwyn pulled Nixon's lapel and said to him, "You'll have to do better than that if you want to carry California", in reference to the forthcoming presidential election. Goldwyn died at home in 1974 aged 94. Goldwyn's son, Samuel Goldwyn Jr., moved into the house in 1976 and lived there until his death in 2015.

=== Taylor Swift ===
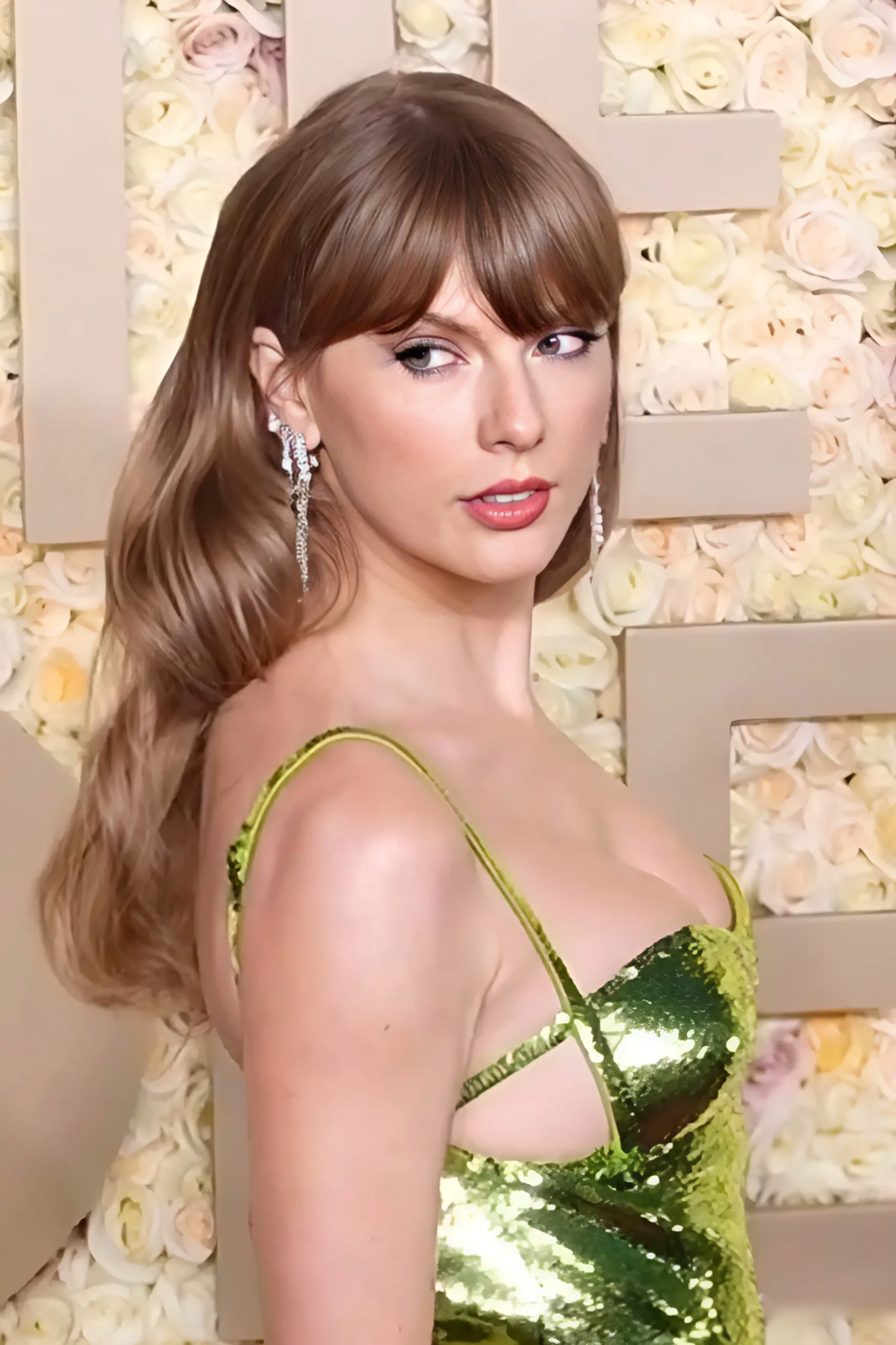
Taylor Swift, the estate's current owner

Having been on the market during various periods since 2008, the house was put up for sale for $39 million in 2015 following the death of Samuel Goldwyn, Jr. in January of that year. The house was sold in September 2015 for $25 million to the singer-songwriter Taylor Swift. Since her purchase of the house, Swift has worked to restore it to its original condition under the architect Monique Schenk, who said they had preserved and maintained the original fabric of the house and replicated deteriorated elements. Work undertaken by Swift includes window restoration, the reconstruction of columns at the swimming pool cabana, the preservation of the Wisteria foliage partially adorning the house's facade, and restoring wooden decorative elements such as lattice panels and wooden finials.

Swift has sought its recognition as a local landmark by the Beverly Hills Cultural Heritage Commission and the Beverly Hills City Council. Noah Furie, the vice chair of the Beverly Hills Cultural Heritage Commission said in a meeting that the house was "one of the great estates in this city" and that it was "very important to the history of the city". Furie said that they were "thrilled" that the present owner would "keep this house and spend the money to restore it because it's no small thing to do". Mayor of Beverly Hills Lili Bosse said, "I think this is a true community gem and [am] really so thrilled that this will be landmarked and preserved." In 2017 the house was made a National Historic Landmark, a status granted to buildings of historical significance in the U.S. Swift's 2020 studio albums Folklore and Evermore were partially recorded in a studio built on the estate, named Kitty Committee Studios, as a result of the COVID-19 pandemic. In the same week Folklore won the Grammy Award for Album of the Year, Swift returned to the studio to record vocals for Big Red Machine tracks "Renegade" and "Birch" from the 2021 album How Long Do You Think It's Gonna Last?.

== See also ==
- High Watch, another estate owned by Swift.

== Sources ==
- Berg, A. Scott (2013). Goldwyn: A Biography. New York City: Simon and Schuster. ISBN 978-1-4711-3006-9.
- Easton, Carol (2014). The Search for Sam Goldwyn. Mississippi: University Press of Mississippi. ISBN 978-1-62674-132-4.
