= Folklore: The Long Pond Studio Sessions =

2020 American documentary concert film and live album

- Official release poster
- Directed by: Taylor Swift
- Based on: Folklore by Taylor Swift
- Produced by: Taylor Swift; Robert Allen; Bart Peters
- Starring: Taylor Swift; Jack Antonoff; Aaron Dessner; Justin Vernon
- Cinematography: Ethan Palmer
- Edited by: Laura Randolph
- Production companies: Taylor Swift Productions; Big Branch Productions
- Distributed by: Disney+
- Release date: November 25, 2020
- Running time: 106 minutes
- Country: United States
- Language: English

Folklore: The Long Pond Studio Sessions (stylized in all lowercase) is a 2020 American documentary concert film directed and produced by the American singer-songwriter Taylor Swift, released on Disney+ on November 25, 2020. The documentary is set at Long Pond Studio, an isolated recording studio in a forested area in the Hudson Valley, New York; Swift performs all of the 17 tracks of her eighth studio album, Folklore (2020), whilst discussing the creative process behind the songs with her collaborators Aaron Dessner and Jack Antonoff. Swift made her debut as a film director with the documentary, which is her fourth film to be released on a streaming service, following the releases of The 1989 World Tour Live (2015), Taylor Swift: Reputation Stadium Tour (2018), and Miss Americana (2020).

Receiving widespread critical acclaim, Folklore: The Long Pond Studio Sessions was praised for its music, intimacy, visuals, and insight provided on Folklore, with many critics labeling the film an admirable supplement to the album. It received an approval rating of 100% on the review aggregator website Rotten Tomatoes. Imbued by the sessions, Swift wrote and recorded several new songs off-screen while shooting the documentary. These songs came to be a major portion of Swift's ninth studio album, Evermore (2020), which was released fifteen days after the documentary. The film received the Gracie Grand Award for Outstanding Special or Variety. Accompanying the film's premiere, a live album soundtrack, entitled Folklore: The Long Pond Studio Sessions (From the Disney+ Special), consisting of the recordings of the live performances featured in the film, was released to music streaming and digital platforms.

== Synopsis ==
In September 2020, Swift and her co-producers for her eighth studio album, Dessner, and Antonoff, assembled at Long Pond Studio—a secluded, rustic cabin in the Hudson Valley, New York—to play the complete album for the first time in the same room after writing, recording, and producing it in isolation due to the COVID-19 pandemic. The result was the concert documentary, Folklore: The Long Pond Studio Sessions, where the three performed stripped-down, acoustic renditions of all 17 tracks in order, while revealing the creative process, stories, and inspirations behind the songs through discussions.

The film's premise on Disney+ reads: "Taylor Swift performs every song from her best-selling album, "Folklore", in a truly intimate concert experience. Accompanied by her co-producers, Aaron Dessner (of The National) and Jack Antonoff (of Bleachers), along with a guest appearance by Justin Vernon (of Bon Iver), Taylor filmed the event at the historic Long Pond Studios in upstate New York, a setting that evokes the nostalgic, wistful nature of the album. In between live performances, she and her collaborators discuss the creation and meaning behind each song, and also share the challenges and joys of remotely producing this acclaimed and record-setting collection.

== Cast ==
- Taylor Swift, vocalist and instrumentalist
- Aaron Dessner, instrumentalist
- Jack Antonoff, instrumentalist
- Justin Vernon, vocalist

== Production ==
A still from the film in which Taylor Swift (middle) sings into a microphone while Jack Antonoff (left) plays a guitar and Aaron Dessner (right) is at the piano

Folklore: The Long Pond Studio Sessions is a hybrid between a documentary and a concert film. It marked the first time Swift, Dessner and Antonoff had assembled together in person after several months of COVID-19 quarantining. Due to the pandemic, they were filmed not by a film crew, but instead by six Panasonic Lumix S1H mirrorless cameras with Leica lenses embedded in the studio, along with one Arri Alexa LF with an Angénieux 24–290 lens on an Agito Trax modular dolly system with more than 30 feet of curved track that occasionally scans the recording session from the background. A drone camera was also used to capture aerial shots of the studio and the surrounding forested estate. Justin Vernon appeared via video stream from Eau Claire, Wisconsin, to perform "Exile" with Swift.

The film is characterized by a casual, small-scale production and a softly lit, cottagecore aesthetic. Apart from a few videos of Swift at her home studio, the film was entirely recorded at Long Pond Studios in New York's Hudson Valley—one of the places where Folklore was engineered. The studio, which is located near Dessner's residence and was originally a barn, had been converted into a wooden cabin situated in a waterfront estate beside an elongated pond and surrounded by chairs, string lights, and fire pits. The studio is an open room with a church-high ceiling, tall windows, and a woodland view, set up with a variety of Dessner's musical instruments. The ambience outside the studio consists of sounds of birds, insects, frogs, or the trees swaying in the wind. In the film, Swift performed seated on a couch in an oversized plaid shirt-dress, singing directly into a microphone, with Antonoff and Dessner playing instruments and an engineer in the back of the room. The instruments used in the film include a variety of guitars, keyboards, a Fender bass, a piano, a drum machine, and a snare.

== Release ==
Like the release of Folklore, Folklore: The Long Pond Studio Sessions was a surprise release, announced hours before its launch at midnight. It was released on Disney+ on November 25, 2020 and on Hotstar in India and Indonesia on November 26, 2020.

== Reception ==
=== Critical response ===
Folklore: The Long Pond Studio Sessions received positive reviews from film and music critics. On review aggregator website Rotten Tomatoes, the film has an approval rating of 100% based on 13 reviews, with an average rating of 7.4/10. On Metacritic, it has a weighted average score of 76 out of 100, based on 7 critics, indicating "generally favorable" reviews. Andrew Barker of Variety praised the film's picturesque setting, performances, and ability to recreate Folklore's "sparse yet carefully textured soundscapes" with fewer instruments, and dubbed Swift's vocals as the film's "most striking element". NME writer Will Richards named it a perfect "early Christmas present" and praised its editing, especially when Swift and Dessner have a "genuinely touching" discussion on the meaning behind the song "Peace", followed by a performance of the song that "hits right in the gut".

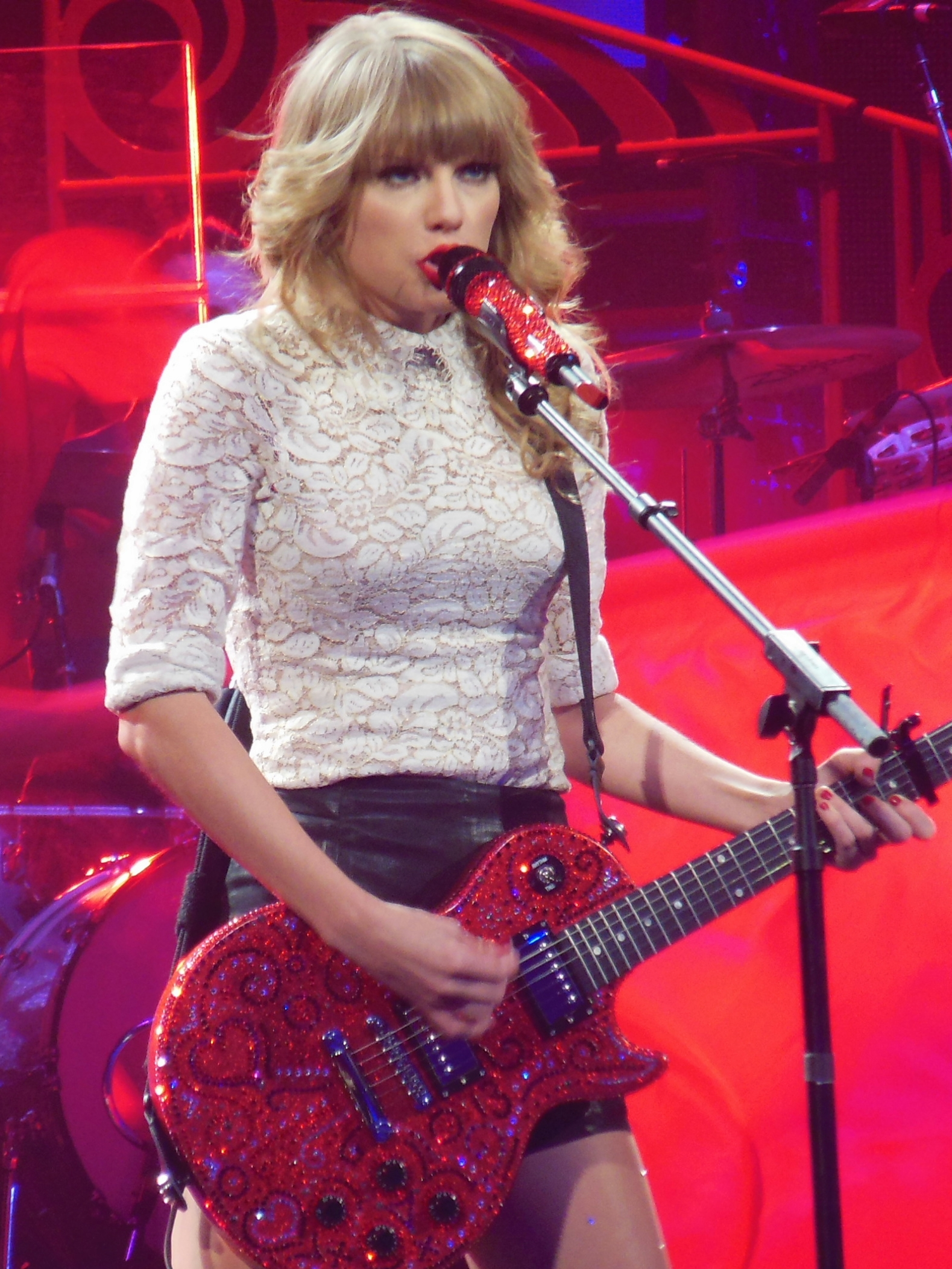
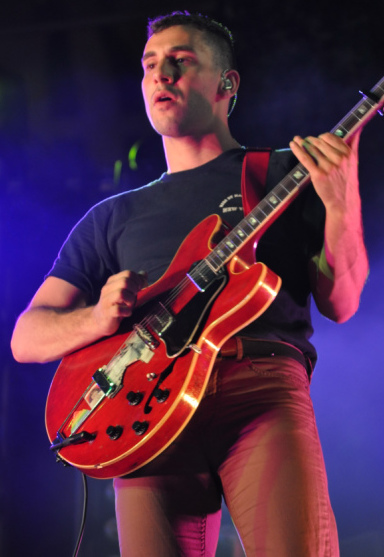
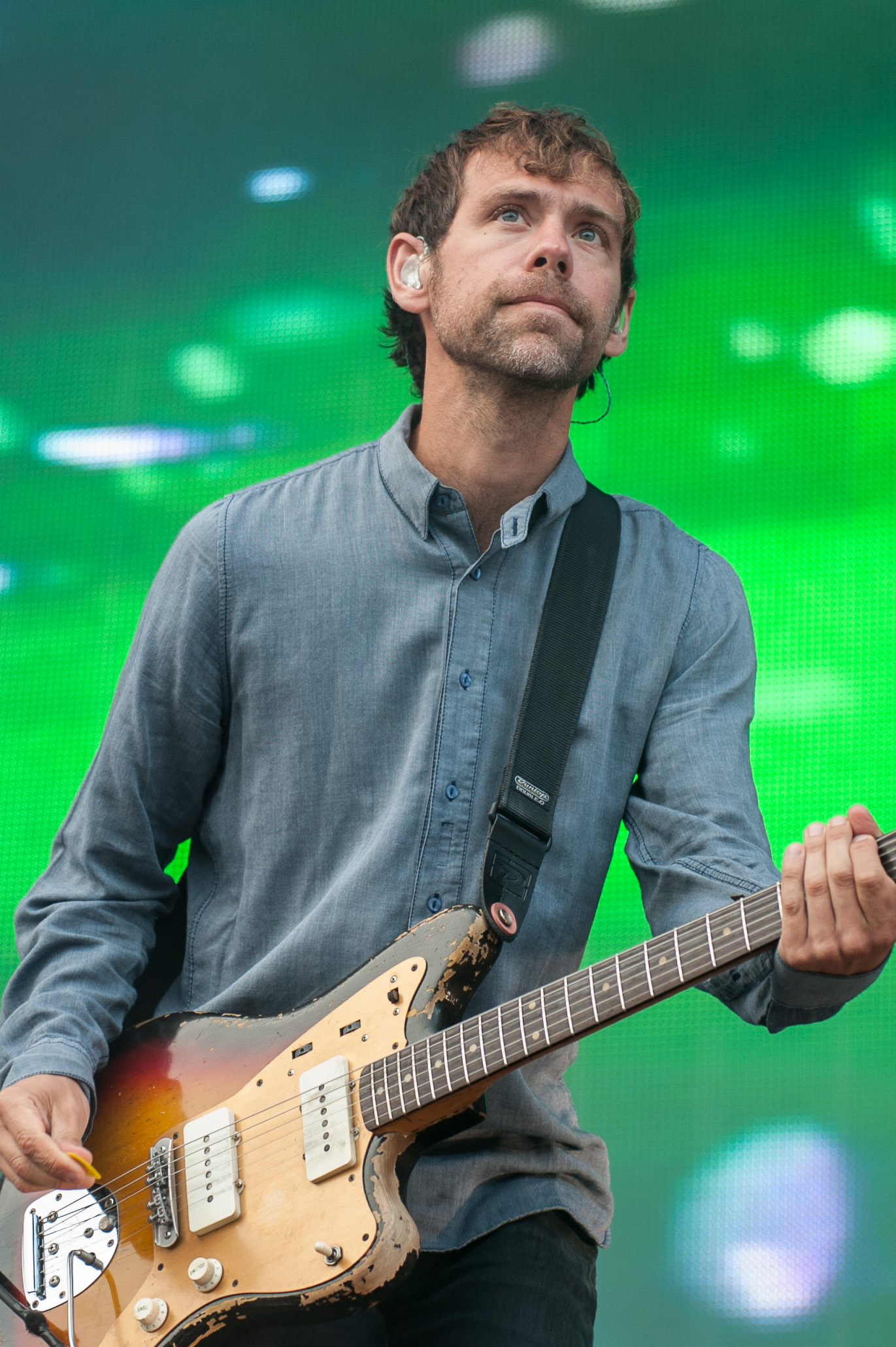
Critics praised the conversational and musical chemistry between (from left to right) Swift, Antonoff, and Dessner.

Writing for The New York Times, Jon Pareles dubbed the film a "musical experience" that heightens the album's "sense of pristine contemplation" using a small-scale, casual-looking production. i newspaper's Sarah Carson defined the film as "artfully crafted, aesthetically gorgeous, cosy cottagecore escapism" with diverse conversations, such as light-hearted "giggly" discussions around the campfire to formal introspection on stiff chairs. Carson opined that it sheds "genuine light" on Swift's work, seeing her at peace with her life, laughing, "publicly relaxed for the first time in a decade". Decider critic Johnny Loftus found it refreshing to see and hear Swift in the "dressed-down setting" of Long Pond Studio Sessions, calling the film "a balm for the soul as we wind down an extremely not cool year" and an intimate portrait of artists at work, in contrast to the pop persona that dominated Swift's career.

Little White Lies critic Sydney Urbanek lauded the film as a "triumphant debut" for Swift as a film director, as well as the cast's on-screen presence: Swift's and Antonoff's "captivating" one-on-one chats and Dessner's studio focus. Alex Hudson of Exclaim! described the film as "an oasis of tranquility in a chaotic time", in which "even the biggest pop star on Earth holed up and got cozy and insular". He admired Swift's rapport with Antonoff—their "laugh-out-loud" jokes—and the discussions that yielded "interesting insights and factoids" about the songwriting of Folklore. Junkee's Richard He complimented Swift's vocals, emotion, the film's visuals and intimacy, and the cast's instrumental skills; he described the film as a "masterclass" in songcraft and "a rare glimpse inside a genius songwriter's mind". In He's words, "Great popstars embody our times; great songwriters address them. Taylor Swift is doing both".

Rob Sheffield of Rolling Stone praised the cast's chemistry and asserted that The Long Pond Studio Sessions is not a mere footnote to the album but rather a "stunning musical statement in its own right, full of stripped-down acoustic warmth". He underlined how Swift moves past vague anecdotes about the tracks by explaining why she felt the need to write such music in the first place. Branding it a "very beautifully done" film, The Daily Telegraph's Kate Solomon called it a "very warm two hours of music that gives the songs a new lease of life", and observed the parallels between the "luscious, remote surroundings" of the studio and how they reflect the "lusciousness and isolation" of the songs. Stuff critic James Croot compared the special's atmosphere to that of MTV Unplugged, and added that the film's production is slick despite the intimate appeal, similar to Swift's 2020 Netflix documentary, Miss Americana.

Drew Taylor of Collider labeled the film "a winning examination and celebration" of Folklore, and "a look at one of the world's biggest pop stars at her most vulnerable and artistically ambitious". He picked Antonoff as the more active personality, while Dessner is "terse", except at the point where he opens up about his depression—"a moment that is both incredibly vulnerable and also powerful". Ryan Lattanzio of IndieWire described the film as "a window into the introspective songwriting" of Folklore that "isn't going to blow your head off" but is a "fine supplement to one of the year's most beloved albums". The Guardian's Elle Hunt wrote that the film shows Swift at ease, but also at the "peak of her power" with little to prove, while her song-by-song commentary depicts the "shifting emotional tenor" she felt in quarantine. However, Hunt felt that Swift not name-dropping her detractors "seems coy" as it limits the film's personal reflection.

=== Accolades ===
Awards and nominations
Organization	Year	Award	Result	Ref.
Shorty Awards	2021	Best Use of Emojis	Nominated	
Gracie Awards	2021	Grand Award for Special or Variety	Won	

== Impact ==
American comedian Jimmy Fallon released a parody of the documentary on YouTube, titled Fallonlore: The 30 Rock Sessions, featuring American hip-hop band the Roots. In the skit, Fallon wrote an album in quarantine, enlisting Questlove and Black Thought to help him finish it remotely. Months later, the trio gathered at 30 Rockefeller Center to perform their tracks together for the first time. The setlist included songs titled "Peed My Pants in an Applebee's", "Song About Milk", "Sourdough Heart", and "Fuzzy Wuzzy" featuring Chris Martin of Coldplay.

Most of the songs on Evermore—Swift's ninth studio album and Folklore's sister album—were recorded while filming The Long Pond Studio Sessions.

A still from the film was featured in a 2021 television advertisement by The New York Times, titled "The Truth Is Essential: Life Right Now", showcasing a variety of articles from the publication.

The Department of English of the Queen's University at Kingston, a public research university in Ontario, Canada, offers a fall semester course titled "Taylor Swift's Literary Legacy (Taylor's Version)", with a syllabus requiring students to watch and analyze many of Swift's works, including Folklore: The Long Pond Studio Sessions; the course objective is to examine Swift's music, its literary references, and her sociopolitical impact on contemporary culture.

After the release of Folklore, Folklore: The Long Pond Studio Sessions, and Evermore, artists such as Maya Hawke, Gracie Abrams, Ed Sheeran, King Princess, and Girl in Red desired to collaborate with Dessner and record songs at his Long Pond Studio. Dessner stated, "After Taylor, it was a bit crazy how many people reached out. And getting to meet and write songs with people you wouldn't have had access to... I'm so grateful for it." He described the studio as a "creative oasis" for artists.

== Live album ==
Folklore: The Long Pond Studio Sessions

Live album / soundtrack by Taylor Swift
- Released: November 25, 2020
- Recorded: September 2020
- Studios: Long Pond Studio, Hudson Valley
- Length: 2:14:43
- Label: Republic
- Producers: Taylor Swift; Aaron Dessner; Jack Antonoff; Joe Alwyn

Taylor Swift chronology
Folklore (2020)	Folklore: The Long Pond Studio Sessions (2020)	Evermore (2020)

Professional ratings
Review scores
Source	Rating
AllMusic	3/5 stars
Sputnikmusic	3.5/5

Folklore: The Long Pond Studio Sessions (From the Disney+ Special) (stylized in all lowercase except "Disney+") is the accompanying soundtrack album to the film, consisting of the acoustic renditions that Swift performed. It was released to streaming and digital platforms on November 25, 2020, alongside the film.

On April 22, 2023, to commemorate Record Store Day, a limited-edition vinyl LP of the album was released exclusively via independent record shops participating in the event. All of the 75,000 vinyl LPs available in the US sold out within one week, and the album debuted at number three on the US Billboard 200. With Midnights (2022) charting at number four and Lover (2019) at number ten that week, Swift became the first artist since Prince in 2016 to concurrently chart three albums in the top ten.

Folklore: The Long Pond Studio Sessions also marked the first RSD-exclusive album in history to land in the Billboard 200's top 10. A total of 115,000 copies were available for purchase worldwide, all of which sold out within the first few days. Elsewhere, the live album peaked at number three in the Netherlands, number four in the United Kingdom, and number five in Hungary.

=== Track listing ===
Folklore: The Long Pond Studio Sessions track listing
No.	Title	Writer(s)	Length
1.	"The 1"	Taylor Swift; Aaron Dessner	3:40
2.	"Cardigan"	Swift; Dessner	3:51
3.	"The Last Great American Dynasty"	Swift; Dessner	3:52
4.	"Exile" (featuring Bon Iver)	Swift; William Bowery; Justin Vernon	4:40
5.	"My Tears Ricochet"	Swift	4:55
6.	"Mirrorball"	Swift; Jack Antonoff	3:57
7.	"Seven"	Swift; Dessner	3:29
8.	"August"	Swift; Antonoff	4:20
9.	"This Is Me Trying"	Swift; Antonoff	3:29
10.	"Illicit Affairs"	Swift; Antonoff	3:04
11.	"Invisible String"	Swift; Dessner	4:17
12.	"Mad Woman"	Swift; Dessner	3:58
13.	"Epiphany"	Swift; Dessner	4:35
14.	"Betty"	Swift; Bowery	4:50
15.	"Peace"	Swift; Dessner	3:34
16.	"Hoax"	Swift; Dessner	3:42
17.	"The Lakes"	Swift; Antonoff	3:20
Total length:			67:25

Notes

- All track titles are stylized in all lowercase, noted as "The Long Pond Studio Sessions", and produced by Swift.
- In the deluxe edition, Disc 1 mirrors the track listing of the deluxe edition of Folklore (2020) with the live tracks on Disc 2.

=== Charts ===
Chart performance
Chart (2023)	Peak position
Australian Albums (ARIA)	24
Belgian Albums (Ultratop Flanders)	126
Danish Albums (Hitlisten)	12
Dutch Albums (Album Top 100)	3
Hungarian Albums (MAHASZ)	5
Irish Albums (Official Charts)	6
New Zealand Albums (RMNZ)	24
Scottish Albums (Official Charts)	1
Swedish Physical Albums (Sverigetopplistan)	5
UK Albums (Official Charts)	4
US Billboard 200	3
US Soundtrack Albums (Billboard)	1
US Top Alternative Albums (Billboard)	1
US Top Rock & Alternative Albums (Billboard)	1
US Indie Store Album Sales (Billboard)	1

=== Release history ===
Release dates and formats
Region	Date	Format(s)	Label	Ref.
Various	November 25, 2020	Digital download; streaming	Republic	
Various	April 22, 2023	Vinyl LP	Republic	

== See also ==
- List of Disney+ original films
