= The 1 =

2020 song by Taylor Swift

Promotional single by Taylor Swift

from the album Folklore
- Written: c. July 2020
- Released: October 9, 2020
- Studio: Long Pond (Hudson Valley)
- Genre: Folk; soft rock
- Length: 3:30
- Label: Republic
- Songwriters: Taylor Swift; Aaron Dessner
- Producer: Aaron Dessner

Lyric video
- "The 1" on YouTube

"The 1" is a song by the American singer-songwriter Taylor Swift and the opening track of her eighth studio album, Folklore (2020). She wrote the song with its producer, Aaron Dessner. A folk and soft rock tune with elements of indie folk, "The 1" sets Swift's conversational vocals over a production consisting of piano and percussion. In its lyrics, the narrator fondly introspects a failed romance and details the time when she found "the one" who never came to be. Republic Records released the song for download in Germany on October 9, 2020.

"The 1" received generally positive reviews from critics, who discussed the song's significance as the album's opening track and praised the songwriting and production. Commercially, the song debuted and peaked at number four on the US Billboard Hot 100 and was certified platinum by the Recording Industry Association of America. It charted within the top 10 and received certifications in several countries. Swift included "The 1" as part of the concert documentary Folklore: The Long Pond Studio Sessions (2020) and the set list of her Eras Tour (2023–2024). It has been covered by Coldplay, Counting Crows, Maggie Rogers, and Tate McRae.

== Development and release ==
The American singer-songwriter Taylor Swift began work on her eighth studio album, Folklore, during the COVID-19 lockdowns in early 2020. She conceived the record as figments of mythopoeic visuals in her mind, as a result of her imagination "running wild" while isolating herself during lockdown. For the album's sound, Swift recruited the first-time collaborator, Aaron Dessner, as a producer on Folklore. "The 1" was one of the tracks written by both Swift and Dessner, who produced the song. Due to the lockdown, they were separated and had to send them via digital files to create the album.

Although much of the songs they worked on started from Dessner's instrumental tracks, "The 1" was written first and then produced. It was one of the last two songs written for Folklore, the other being "Hoax"; Dessner thought the album was finished before Swift sent a voice memo with lyrics of "The 1" days prior to the album's release. Dessner subsequently worked on some of its production and tracked Swift's vocals, and then his brother Bryce Dessner added orchestration to the song. Aaron Dessner described the song's development as "one of the very last things [they] did" for Folklore. "The 1" was included as the opening track on Folklore, which was released on July 24, 2020. Republic Records issued it for download in Germany on October 9.

== Music and lyrics ==
"The 1"
A sample of "The 1", which presents the slightly echoing piano, percussion instruments, and Swift's conversational delivery.

"The 1" is three minutes and thirty seconds long. It was recorded by Aaron Dessner and Jonathan Low at Long Pond in Hudson Valley. The vocals were recorded by Laura Sisk at Kitty Committee Studio in Los Angeles. Aaron Dessner provided drum programming and instruments for the track, including acoustic guitar, electric guitar, Mellotron, OP1, piano, and synth bass. Other musicians on the song are Jason Treuting (percussion), Thomas Bartlett (OP1, synthesizer), and Yuki Numata Resnick (viola, violin). It was mixed by Low at Long Pond and mastered by Randy Merrill at Sterling Sound in New York City.

"The 1" is a folk and soft rock tune, with elements of indie folk. The production begins with a piano that has a bit reverb to it, labeled by critics as "optimistic" and "soft". The only piano chords used throughout the song are C and F. It incorporates a number of percussion instruments, including sparse and crisp programmed drums, slapped guitar strums, and finger-snaps; these bring what critics deemed a lively beat to the track, which is set at a tempo of 70 beats per minute. Combined with the piano, this resulted in an instrumentation they thought was "bouncy", "breezy", "brooding", and one of the most upbeat on Folklore. It also includes vocal harmonies. Some critics commented that aspects of the production were influenced by the music of Aaron Dessner and his bands the National and Big Red Machine. (Note: Aaron Dessner's influence on "The 1" is attributed to Jason Lipshutz of Billboard, Hannah Mylrea of NME, Ellen Johnson of Paste, and Allegra Frank of Vox. Mylrea and Johnson also cited the National and Big Red Machine, respectively.)

The lyrics of "The 1" has a theme of introspection. The song describes the narrator positively reminiscing on a past relationship during her "roaring 20s". It explores on how she found "the one" at the time and wishes they could have been together: "It would have been fun, if you would've been the one". The lyrics also addresses the narrator's languid contemplation for an ideal romance: "You know, the greatest loves of all time are over now". Swift's conversational singing on the track contains elliptical wording and humorous one-liners juxtaposed against the sadness. Her voice is also "enigmatic" and clear, according to MusicOMH's Chloe Johnson, who believed it allowed her to highlight the song's narrative and imagery. Allegra Frank of Vox thought the song was less a "kiss-off [but] more a solitary, gray-skied stroll through her day-to-day". Rolling Stone's writer Rob Sheffield connected it to the fellow album track "Peace", opining that they "tell both sides" of the same narrative.

== Critical reception ==
"The 1" received generally positive reviews from critics. They discussed the song regarding its placement on the album as the opening track, the majority of whom found its style for Folklore to deviate from her previous works (Note: Attributed to Katie Atkinson of Billboard, Courteney Lacrossa of Business Insider, and both Allaire Nuss and Maura Johnston of Entertainment Weekly) and to set the album's tone. (Note: Attributed to Chloe Johnson of MusicOMH, Michael Sumsion of PopMatters, and Channing Freeman of Sputnikmusic) Allegra Frank of Vox found the production danceable like her other album openers but "markedly slowed down" in comparison. Business Insider's critics Callie Ahlgrim and Courtney Lacrossa believed the song was Swift's best opening track since "State of Grace" from her 2012 album Red. John Wohlmacher from Beats Per Minute found the track had a vocal melody and song structure similar to "I Forgot That You Existed"—the opener of her 2019 album Lover—but thought their aesthetics were quite distinct from each other. Channing Freeman of Sputnikmusic wrote that the song's placement was a little detrimental as the rest of Folklore employs its style and believed this made the song somewhat less engaging.

Critics mainly praised the song's production and songwriting. Ahlgrim included the song on her mid-year list of the best songs of 2020 and lauded it as one of Swift's "most relatable and stirring" tracks. Lacrossa believed the track was "incredibly solid" and her delivery had "a breezy attention to rhythm" that complements the narrative. Frank thought it was "wistful, introspective, and impressionistic" that does not neglect Swift's signature "melodic pop" and one of the defining tracks of Folklore. Wohlmacher was impressed by how "poignant and mature" the lyrics were. Johnson believed it was thoroughly written and produced. The New Yorker writer Amanda Petrusich thought Swift's rumination on the track was "heartening" and "serene" in a comical manner. The Telegraph critic Neil McCormick said that the song was full of narrative details and opined that its theme of "defeated love" may "suggest Swift's social isolation has been a lonely one". Caleb Campbell from Under the Radar deemed the song's lyrics about a crumbling romance one of her most mature takes on the subject to date.

Ellen Johnson of Paste described the lyrics as "bright, vivid and occasionally funny" but in a more sophisticated way compared to Swift's previous songs. Katie Moulton from Consequence thought the track was one of the first songs she did not write for radio formats and highlighted the "self-awareness and willingness to both hold herself responsible and forgive" that makes it distinguishable from other album tracks. Anna Leszkiewicz of the New Statesman found the lyrics "[w]istful but refreshingly lacking in regret" and believed the song blended her skill of "romantic nostalgia with a novel ease and acceptance". Eloise Bulmer from The Line of Best Fit said Swift embodied an "unlucky-in-love" character on the track and thought it showcased her wit. In contrast, Roisin O'Connor of The Independent favored the song's smaller details more than the one-liners. Hannah Mylrea from NME wrote that the instrumentation accompanies Swift's vocals and the hook very well. Slant Magazine's Jonathan Keefe stated that the song's use of repetitions succeeded, along with "Invisible String".

A few reviewers were more reserved in their praise. Spencer Kornhaber from The Atlantic said the track was reminiscent of the English singer-songwriter Ed Sheeran and felt that its "solemnity [was] forced". Jason Lipshutz of Billboard listed the song at number eleventh on his ranking of the tracks from Folklore and said that it stays "unadorned" for the majority of its length. The Los Angeles Times' Mikael Wood placed the song as the weakest track on his ranking of the album and believed it was "less emotionally daring" than the rest of the tracks.

== Commercial performance ==
"The 1" debuted and peaked within the top 10 at number four on the US Billboard Hot 100, alongside the fellow album tracks "Cardigan" and "Exile" at numbers one and six, respectively. This made Swift the first artist to debut two songs in the top four and three songs in the top six at the same time. It also debuted and peaked on the Rolling Stone Top 100 chart at number two behind "Cardigan". The song received a platinum certification from the Recording Industry Association of America. On the Billboard Global 200, "The 1" debuted and peaked at number 114.

Elsewhere, "The 1" reached the top 10 in the countries of Malaysia (5), Singapore (5), Canada (7), Ireland (7), and New Zealand (7). In Australia, the song debuted on the ARIA Singles Chart alongside the rest of Folklore—peaking at number four—and helped made Swift have the most debuts in one week with 16 entries. It was certified triple platinum by the Australian Recording Industry Association. In the United Kingdom, the song peaked at number 10 on the OCC's UK Singles Chart and increased Swift's top-10 entries to 16. It received a platinum certification from the British Phonographic Industry. The song has been certified in other countries, receiving double platinum in Brazil, platinum in New Zealand, and gold in Denmark and Spain.

== Live performances and covers ==
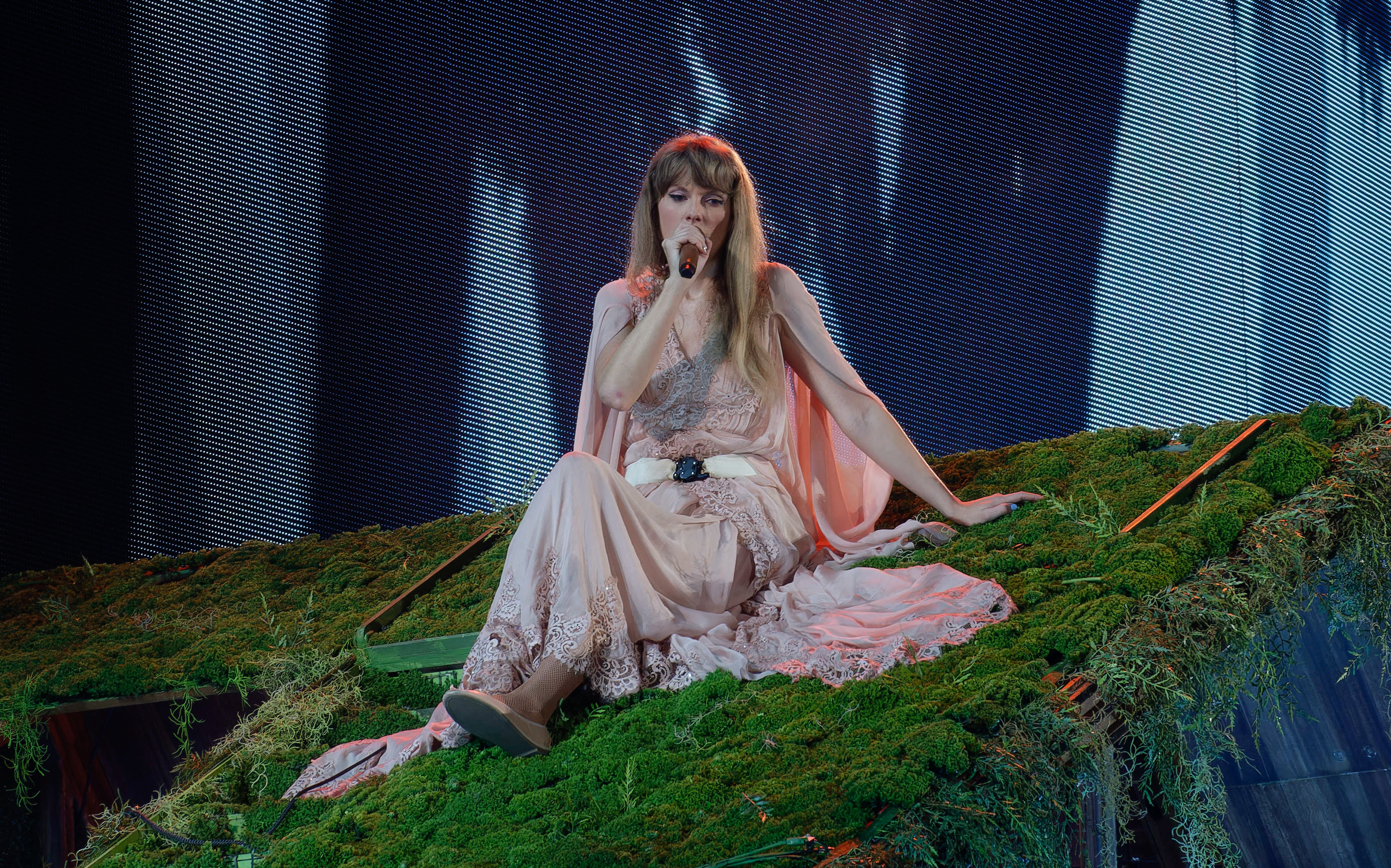
Swift performing "The 1" on the Eras Tour (2023–2024)

Swift recorded a stripped-down rendition of "The 1" for the Disney+ concert documentary Folklore: The Long Pond Studio Sessions and its live album, both of which were released on November 25, 2020. The song replaced "Invisible String" in the set list of her Eras Tour starting from the Arlington, Texas stop on March 31, 2023, and was removed from it starting on the Paris stop on May 9, 2024. On July 13, Swift sang it as part of a mashup with her song "Wonderland" (2014) during an Eras Tour show in Milan.

Some musicians and bands have covered "The 1" during their concerts. Counting Crows performed the track two times; they first did so at a show in Las Vegas on September 2, 2023, and again at Boston on June 26, 2025. During a show at Vienna's Ernst-Happel-Stadion as part of Coldplay's Music of the Spheres World Tour on August 15, 2024, the band and Maggie Rogers dedicated a performance of "The 1" as a tribute to the cancelled shows of the Eras Tour following the uncovering of a terror plot at the same venue earlier that month. On May 23, 2025, Tate McRae did an acoustic guitar rendition of the song during a Stuttgart show as part of her Miss Possessive Tour.

== Personnel ==
Credits are adapted from Pitchfork.

- Taylor Swift – vocals, songwriting
- Aaron Dessner – songwriting, production, drum programming, acoustic guitar, electric guitar, Mellotron, OP1, piano, synth bass, synthesizer, recording
- Bryce Dessner – orchestration
- Jason Treuting – percussion, recording
- Thomas Bartlett – OP1, synthesizer, recording
- Yuki Numata Resnick – viola, violin
- Kyle Resnick – recording
- Laura Sisk – vocal recording
- Jonathan Low – mixing, recording
- Randy Merrill – mastering

== Charts ==
Chart performance for "The 1"
Chart (2020)	Peak position
Australia (ARIA)	4
Canada Hot 100 (Billboard)	7
Estonia (Eesti Tipp-40)	36
Global 200 (Billboard)	114
Ireland (IRMA)	7
Malaysia (RIM)	5
Netherlands (Single Top 100)	99
New Zealand (Recorded Music NZ)	7
Portugal (AFP)	56
Scottish Singles Sales (Official Charts)	36
Singapore (RIAS)	5
Switzerland (Schweizer Hitparade)	92
UK Singles (Official Charts)	10
US Billboard Hot 100	4
US Rolling Stone Top 100	2

== Certifications ==
Certifications for "The 1"
Region	Certification	Certified units/sales
Australia (ARIA)	3× Platinum	210,000^{‡}
Brazil (Pro-Música Brasil)	2× Platinum	80,000^{‡}
Denmark (IFPI Danmark)	Gold	45,000^{‡}
New Zealand (RMNZ)	Platinum	30,000^{‡}
Spain (Promusicae)	Gold	30,000^{‡}
United Kingdom (BPI)	Platinum	600,000^{‡}
United States (RIAA)	Platinum	1,000,000^{‡}
^{‡} Sales+streaming figures based on certification alone.

== Release history ==
Release dates and formats for "The 1"
Region	Date	Format	Label	Ref.
Germany	October 9, 2020	Digital download	Universal	

== See also ==
- List of Billboard Hot 100 top-ten singles in 2020
- List of top 10 singles in 2020 (Australia)
- List of top 10 singles in 2020 (Ireland)
- List of UK top-ten singles in 2020
