= Peace (Taylor Swift song) =

2020 song by Taylor Swift

Song by Taylor Swift

from the album Folklore
- Released: July 24, 2020
- Studio: Long Pond (Hudson Valley); Kitty Committee (Los Angeles)
- Length: 3:54
- Label: Republic
- Songwriters: Taylor Swift; Aaron Dessner
- Producer: Aaron Dessner

Lyric video
- "Peace" on YouTube

"Peace" is a song by the American singer-songwriter Taylor Swift from her eighth studio album, Folklore (2020). She wrote the track with its producer, Aaron Dessner. It has an R&B-influenced minimalist production and lo-fi instrumentation that features soft piano notes, harmonized basslines, subtle synthesizers, and an electric pulse. In the lyrics, Swift's narrator pledges her commitment to her lover while acknowledging the downsides of media scrutiny she might bring to their relationship.

Music critics generally praised "Peace" for its emotional lyrics and stripped-down production, as well as Swift's vocal performance. Commercially, the track reached the national charts of Australia, Canada, and the United States. It received gold certifications in Australia, Brazil, and New Zealand, and a silver certification in the United Kingdom. Swift recorded an acoustic rendition of "Peace" as part of the documentary film Folklore: The Long Pond Studio Sessions and its live album in 2020, and performed it once on piano at the Eras Tour in 2024.

== Production and release ==
Taylor Swift began working on her eighth studio album, Folklore, during the COVID-19 lockdowns in early 2020. She wrote nine songs on the album with Aaron Dessner, who produced all of them, including "Peace". It was the third track the duo wrote for Folklore, following "Cardigan" and "Seven". The instrumental track of "Peace" consisted of harmonized basslines, a drone, and a pulse—the lattermost was provided by Justin Vernon. Upon hearing the song's composition, Swift believed that it conveyed an "immediate sense of serenity" that roused the feeling of being peaceful, but felt it would be too straightforward to sing about finding peace; she instead wrote about complex "conflicted" feelings that contrast the track's soothing melody. Laura Sisk recorded Swift's vocals in one take at Kitty Committee Studio in Los Angeles. Dessner recorded "Peace" with its mixing engineer, Jonathan Low, at Long Pond Studio in the Hudson Valley, and Randy Merrill mastered the track at Sterling Sound Studios in New York City. Dessner additionally provided field recording and played piano, drone, bass guitar, synthesizer, and Mellotron.

"Peace" is the fifteenth and penultimate track on the standard edition of Folklore, surprise-released on July 24, 2020. Swift recorded an acoustic rendition of the track in September 2020 for the documentary film Folklore: The Long Pond Studio Sessions and its live album. On February 23, 2024, she performed "Peace" on piano in a mashup with "New Year's Day" (2017) at the second Sydney show of the Eras Tour (2023–2024).

== Music and lyrics ==
"Peace"
A sample of "Peace", featuring soft piano notes, subtle synthesizers, silky basslines, and lo-fi instrumentation

"Peace" is three minutes and fifty-four seconds long. It is an R&B-influenced love ballad that features a sparse downbeat arrangement, a minimalist production, lo-fi instrumentation, and a funk bassline. (Note: Attributed to Vulture's Nate Jones, Variety's Chris Willman, The Guardian's Laura Snapes, Pitchfork's Julian Mapes, Paste's Grace Byron, and the Los Angeles Times' Mikael Wood.) The composition consists of three lushly harmonized electric guitars juxtaposed over a ticking pulse, as well as subtle synthesizers and soft piano notes. Grace Byron of Paste described the track as a "blistering hymnal", and Sarah Carson of the i believed that it featured the "storybook poetry hallmarks" of Swift's previous country songs. Mikael Wood of the Los Angeles Times thought that the R&B-leaning composition evoked the music of Prince.

After witnessing the dissection of her personal life by the press throughout her career, Swift kept her six-year relationship with Joe Alwyn away from the public eye. Lyrically, "Peace" addresses the balance Swift struck between her private and public lives and is rooted in her personal life, unlike much of the fictional material on Folklore. In the refrain, the song's narrator demonstrates her commitment to the happiness of her lover in the face of life challenges ("But I'm a fire, and I'll keep your brittle heart warm/ If your cascade ocean wave blues come"). She ultimately admits that although she "would die for you in secret", their relationship will always be scrutinized ("But the rain is always gonna come if you're standing with me").

According to Wood, the song structure of "Peace" is an ode reminiscent of a prayer. Variety's Chris Willman deemed the song's title "deceptive", as the track sees Swift acknowledging that "tranquility is the only thing she can't promise" to her lover. Some publications opined that the lyric "But there's robbers to the east, clowns to the West" is a reference to Swift's publicized feuds, which Business Insider's Callie Ahlgrim thought underscored "her inability to escape the trappings of public life"; they viewed "robbers" as a reference to Scott Borchetta, who sold the masters of Swift's first six albums to Scooter Braun, while the "clowns to the West" refers to Kanye West and Kim Kardashian and their feuds with Swift.

== Critical reception ==
Music critics generally praised "Peace" for its vulnerable lyricism and Swift's vocal performance. Carson deemed it the "most romantic song she has written", and Wilman considered it a suitable addition that contrasts Folklore's overarching sadness: "[It's] a bit of candor renders all the compensatory vows of fidelity and courage all the more credible and deeply lovely." The A.V. Club's Saloni Gajjar and Mary Kate Carr praised the stripped-down production and Swift's "punctuated" vocals. Business Insider's Courteney Larocca similarly lauded the song's "gut-wrenchingly vulnerable" lyrics, "stunning" guitar riffs, and Swift's "crisp" vocal performance. She and Ahlgrim both considered it the third-best track on Folklore. In a less enthusiastic review, Consequence's Kathryn Flynn felt the song's slow pace and muted R&B sound do not fit the album's overall texture. "Peace" appeared in rankings of Swift's discography by NME's Hannah Mylrea (57 out of 161), Vulture's Nate Jones (77 out of 245), and Rolling Stone's Rob Sheffield (163 out of 286).

== Commercial performance ==
In the United States, "Peace" reached number 25 on the Rolling Stone Top 100 chart and number 58 on the Billboard Hot 100 chart. It additionally entered at number 12 on the Billboard Hot Rock & Alternative chart, where it stayed for 10 weeks and appeared at number 53 on the chart's 2020 year-end. The track reached the national charts of Australia (33) and Canada (46), and peaked at number 53 on the Audio Streaming chart in the United Kingdom. "Peace" was certified gold in Australia, Brazil, and New Zealand, and silver in the United Kingdom.

== Personnel ==
Credits are adapted from the liner notes of Folklore.

- Taylor Swift – songwriter
- Aaron Dessner – songwriter, producer, recording engineer, field recording, bass guitar, synthesizer, Mellotron, drone, piano
- Jonathan Low – recording engineer, mixing engineer
- Laura Sisk – vocal recording engineer
- Randy Merrill – mastering engineer
- Justin Vernon – pulse

== Charts ==
=== Weekly charts ===
Weekly chart performance of "Peace"
Chart (2020)	Peak position
Australia (ARIA)	33
Canada Hot 100 (Billboard)	46
UK Audio Streaming (Official Charts)	62
US Billboard Hot 100	58
US Hot Rock & Alternative Songs (Billboard)	12
US Rolling Stone Top 100	25

=== Year-end chart ===
Year-end chart performance of "Peace"
Chart (2020)	Position
US Hot Rock & Alternative Songs (Billboard)	53

== Certifications ==
Certification for "Peace"
Region	Certification	Certified units/sales
Australia (ARIA)	Gold	35,000^{‡}
Brazil (Pro-Música Brasil)	Gold	20,000^{‡}
New Zealand (RMNZ)	Gold	15,000^{‡}
United Kingdom (BPI)	Silver	200,000^{‡}
^{‡} Sales+streaming figures based on certification alone.
