= Seven (Taylor Swift song) =

2020 song by Taylor Swift

Song by Taylor Swift

from the album Folklore
- Released: July 24, 2020
- Recorded: 2020
- Studio: Long Pond (New York)
- Genre: Folk
- Length: 3:28
- Label: Republic
- Songwriters: Taylor Swift; Aaron Dessner
- Producer: Aaron Dessner

Lyric video
- "Seven" on YouTube

"Seven" is a song by the American singer-songwriter Taylor Swift from her eighth studio album, Folklore (2020). Swift co-wrote the song with its producer, Aaron Dessner. "Seven" is a folk song with nostalgic lyricism. It blends present and past perspectives: 30-year-old Swift reflecting on her childhood in Pennsylvania while recalling the purity of her relationship with an old friend and the then 7-year-old narrator incapable of understanding the domestic violence her friend had experienced but realizing it years later. The song is led by Swift's upper register over a swirling piano line, complemented by acoustic guitars, drums, and strings.

The song garnered positive reviews from music critics, many of whom chose it as a standout on Folklore as it dealt with a sensitive topic like child abuse. They also highlighted the experimental composition and Swift's upper-register vocals. Following the release of Folklore, "Seven" debuted at number 35 on the Billboard Hot 100, number 11 on the Rolling Stone Top 100, and number 7 on the US Hot Rock & Alternative Songs. It also reached the top 30 in Australia, Canada, Malaysia, and Singapore.

== Background and release ==
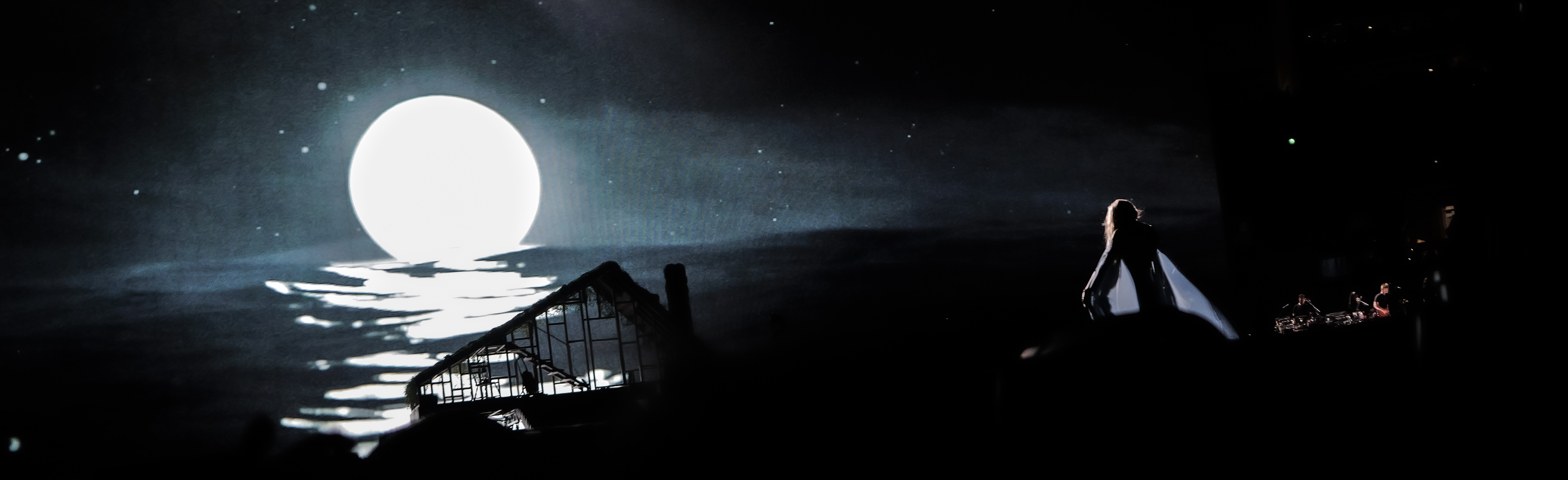
Swift included a spoken interlude of "Seven" on the Eras Tour (2023–24) as an introduction to the Folklore act from March 2023 until March 2024.

Swift conceived all the tracks of her eight studio album, Folklore, as imageries and visuals from her deep subconscious, a result of her imagination "running wild" while isolating herself during the COVID-19 pandemic. "Seven" was the second song that Swift and her co-writer and producer, Aaron Dessner, wrote for the album, following "Cardigan". Dessner recalled that "Cardigan" and "Seven" laid out the roadmap for writing the rest of the album. He classified the song as "wistful and nostalgic". Describing the writing process as "looking back at childhood and those childhood feelings, recounting memories and memorializing them," he identified the lyric "And just like a folk song, our love will be passed on" as a defining moment of Folklore, commemorating friendship and nostalgia.

Folklore was released on July 24, 2020. It featured "Seven" as the seventh song in the track-list. In the primer that preceded the release, Swift teased various tracks, with "Seven" being about "the tree swing in the woods of my childhood. Hushed tones of 'let's run away' and never doing it." Lyric videos of each song on the album were released to Swift's YouTube channel; "Seven" has since garnered over 21 million views as of August 2024. The song was also included in Folklore: The Escapism Chapter and Folklore: The Saltbox House Chapter, streaming compilations by Swift released on August 21 and August 27, 2020, respectively. Commercially, "Seven" debuted at number 35 on the Billboard Hot 100 chart alongside the album's 15 other songs and at number 11 on the Rolling Stone Top 100. Additionally, the song debuted at number seven on the Billboard Hot Rock & Alternative Songs chart. The song reached the top 20 in Australia, Malaysia, and Singapore.

"Seven" is played during the closing credits of the 2022 coming-of-age drama film Summering. The song is played in the final episode of the second season of the British coming-of-age television series Heartstopper. From March 2023 until March 2024, snippets of "Seven" were included on The Eras Tour (2023–2024) as a spoken interlude before the Folklore set. At the tour's second show in Pittsburgh, she performed a full version of the song with Aaron Dessner on piano as one of the show's two surprise songs, which are songs that are not part of the set-list that Swift decides to perform during the acoustic set of the show. Swift dedicated the performance to her dad in honor of Father's Day, saying "This song has to do with really fond memories of childhood and growing up in Pennsylvania."

== Composition and lyrics ==
"Seven" is a nostalgic and "wistful" folk song presenting "the pureness of childhood friendship" from the perspective of a seven-year-old Swift, who is unable to comprehend the emotional and physical abuse of her friend from their parents. The song also describes young Swift's naive efforts to help her friend's escape from the abusive household, and run away to India. The song switches between the use of past and present tense. The song hints at her witness of the abuse and her inability to stop it in lyrics such as: "And I've been meaning to tell you / I think your house is haunted / Your dad is always mad and that must be why / And I think you should come live with me / And we can be pirates".

"Seven"
A sample of the opening chorus, in which Swift starts off with asking the listeners to imagine the song's setting; her seven-year-old self-playing on a swing in a picturesque countryside.

Several lines also see Swift "pay tribute" to the innocence of her infancy as per The Independent's Roisin O'Connor, reminiscing the purity of her relationship with her friend, whom she cannot fully remember. Rebecca Karpen of PopMatters compared the themes of childhood nostalgia and the inevitability of growing up to her songs "Stay Beautiful" and "Mary's Song (Oh My My My)" from her self-titled debut album (2006), "The Best Day" from Fearless (2008), "Never Grow Up" from Speak Now (2010), and her 2012 charity single "Ronan". Eric Mason of Slate highlighted the song's summer imagery, comparing it to that of "August" and "Betty". The lyric "Or hide in the closet" also possibly alludes to her friend's potential homosexuality, according to the critics from Insider and The Advocate.

Musically, the song is set in the key of E major with a tempo of 95 beats per minute. Swift uses her upper register, and her vocals span from E_{3} to B_{4}. The song is instrumented by a prominent piano composition in conjunction with acoustic guitar, drums, cello, viola, and violin. Its melody mimics the movement of a pendulum, elongating at its high point before rushing down and rising up again.

== Critical reception ==
Rebecca Karpen of PopMatters described the song as "heartbreaking" and found its narrative "horrifying", stating that it made her "cry in the middle of 4th Avenue in broad daylight." Jon Caramanica of The New York Times described the song as "intriguing" with the "ethereally lustrous" vocals and experimentation with tone variation. Rob Sheffield's Rolling Stone review approved of Swift's turn from her traditional autobiographical storytelling, instead favoring "let[ting] these characters tell their own stories." Sheffield ranked it as her 19th best song in Swift's catalogue back catalog (until Folklore), praising the "mystery that gets more confusing she [sic] tries to live with it." Katherine Rodgers of The Quietus said that "Swift's reedy voice jostled for dominance over several, fussy layers of intricate melody".

New Statesman critic Anna Leszkiewicz defined the song as "a deft elegy to the lost unselfconsciousness of childhood". In a review published in The Guardian, Laura Snapes described the loss of innocence depicted in "Seven" and the self-interrogation it reflects as "devastating." Music journalist Robert Christgau preferred the youth-tinged themes of "Seven" to the more mature songs on the album. Max Heilman of Riff Magazine praised Swift's indie folk approach to the narrative and her vocal dynamic in "Seven". Others praised the lyric "Then you won't have to cry / Or hide in the closet" for its purported allusions to her friend's queerness. Slate's Carl Wilson opined that "writing of child abuse with this lightness of touch is a feat".

Several critics pointed to the song as a highlight on Folklore. Roison O'Connor chose it as the "most moving song on the album." While acknowledging Swift's turn from her previous pop music, Jody Rosen of the Los Angeles Times described "Seven" as a staple nostalgic track, comparing it to her earlier work narrating childhood friendship. Rosen chose it as "possibly the album's prettiest moment" and highlighted the feminist themes in the lyric "Before I learned civility / I used to scream ferociously / Anytime I wanted." In an NPR critics roundtable, Ann Powers chose "Seven" as a standout on Folklore, arguing it defined Folklore's underlying web of memory. Similar to Rosen, she praised Swift's twist on childhood nostalgia, a common theme in her work.

Mikael Wood of the Los Angeles Times ranked it as the 5th best song on the album, praising the "narrative experimentation", while Jason Lipshutz of Billboard placed it at 3rd, praising the production, instrumentals, and the imagery "steeped in authenticity". Eric Mason of Slate Magazine ranked it second (behind "Exile"), describing it as "one of Folklore's most chilling moments" and praising its maturity compared to her earlier works reflecting childhood friendship and unstable family relationships. Callie Ahlgrim and Courteney Larocca of Insider listed "Seven" among the seven best tracks on the album and referred to its nostalgic lyrics as "pure whimsical magic," comparing the chorus to "a shot of espresso." Ryan Leas of Stereogum wrote that it "leveled [him] each listen" and ranked it as his 4th favorite song of 2020. On the other hand, Jillian Mapes' review of Folklore published in Pitchfork argued that while the track is not a "wild misstep", it is disposable compared to the rest of the songs on the album.

== Credits and personnel ==
Credits adapted from Folklore's album booklet.

- Taylor Swift – vocals, songwriting
- Aaron Dessner – songwriting, production, recording, acoustic guitar, bass, drum programming, percussion, piano, synthesizer
- JT Bates – drums, recording
- Bryce Dessner – orchestration
- Bryan Devendorf – drum programming, recording
- Clarice Jensen – cello, recording
- Jonathan Low – mixing, recording
- Randy Merrill – mastering
- Kyle Resnick – engineering, recording
- Yuki Numata Resnick – viola, violin

== Charts ==
=== Weekly charts ===
Weekly chart performance for "Seven"
Chart (2020)	Peak position
Australia (ARIA)	16
Canada Hot 100 (Billboard)	26
Malaysia (RIM)	20
Portugal (AFP)	112
Singapore (RIAS)	17
Swedish Heatseeker (Sverigetopplistan)	13
UK Audio Streaming (Official Charts)	32
US Billboard Hot 100	35
US Hot Rock & Alternative Songs (Billboard)	7
US Rolling Stone Top 100	11

=== Year-end charts ===
Year-end chart performance for "Seven"
Chart (2020)	Position
US Hot Rock & Alternative Songs (Billboard)	37

== Certifications ==
Certifications for "Seven"
Region	Certification	Certified units/sales
Australia (ARIA)	Platinum	70,000^{‡}
Brazil (Pro-Música Brasil)	Platinum	40,000^{‡}
New Zealand (RMNZ)	Platinum	30,000^{‡}
United Kingdom (BPI)	Gold	400,000^{‡}
^{‡} Sales+streaming figures based on certification alone.
