= Invisible String =

2020 song by Taylor Swift

Song by Taylor Swift

from the album Folklore
- Released: July 24, 2020
- Studio: Long Pond (Hudson Valley); Gaite Lyrique (Paris)
- Genre: Folk
- Length: 4:12
- Label: Republic
- Songwriters: Taylor Swift; Aaron Dessner
- Producer: Aaron Dessner

Lyric video
- "Invisible String" on YouTube

"Invisible String" is a song by the American singer-songwriter Taylor Swift from her eighth studio album, Folklore (2020). She wrote the song with its producer, Aaron Dessner. The lyrics are about how fate brings two soulmates together and refer to specific moments from their lives, containing references to the literature classics Jane Eyre and The Sun Also Rises. Musically, "Invisible String" is a folk tune with elements of blues, pop, and country. Its spare acoustic arrangement is driven by acoustic guitar strums on a rubber bridge and vocal backbeats.

Music critics lauded "Invisible String" for showcasing what they deemed masterful songcraft with endearing sound and lyrics; some picked it as an album highlight. NPR named it one of the best songs of 2020. Commercially, "Invisible String" peaked at number 36 on the US Billboard Hot 100 and on charts of Australia, Canada, Portugal, Singapore, and the United Kingdom, where it received a silver certification. Swift performed "Invisible String" on the first four shows of her sixth headlining concert tour, the Eras Tour, in 2023, and as a surprise song in a mashup with "Superstar" from Fearless on the first Gelsenkirchen show.

== Background and release ==
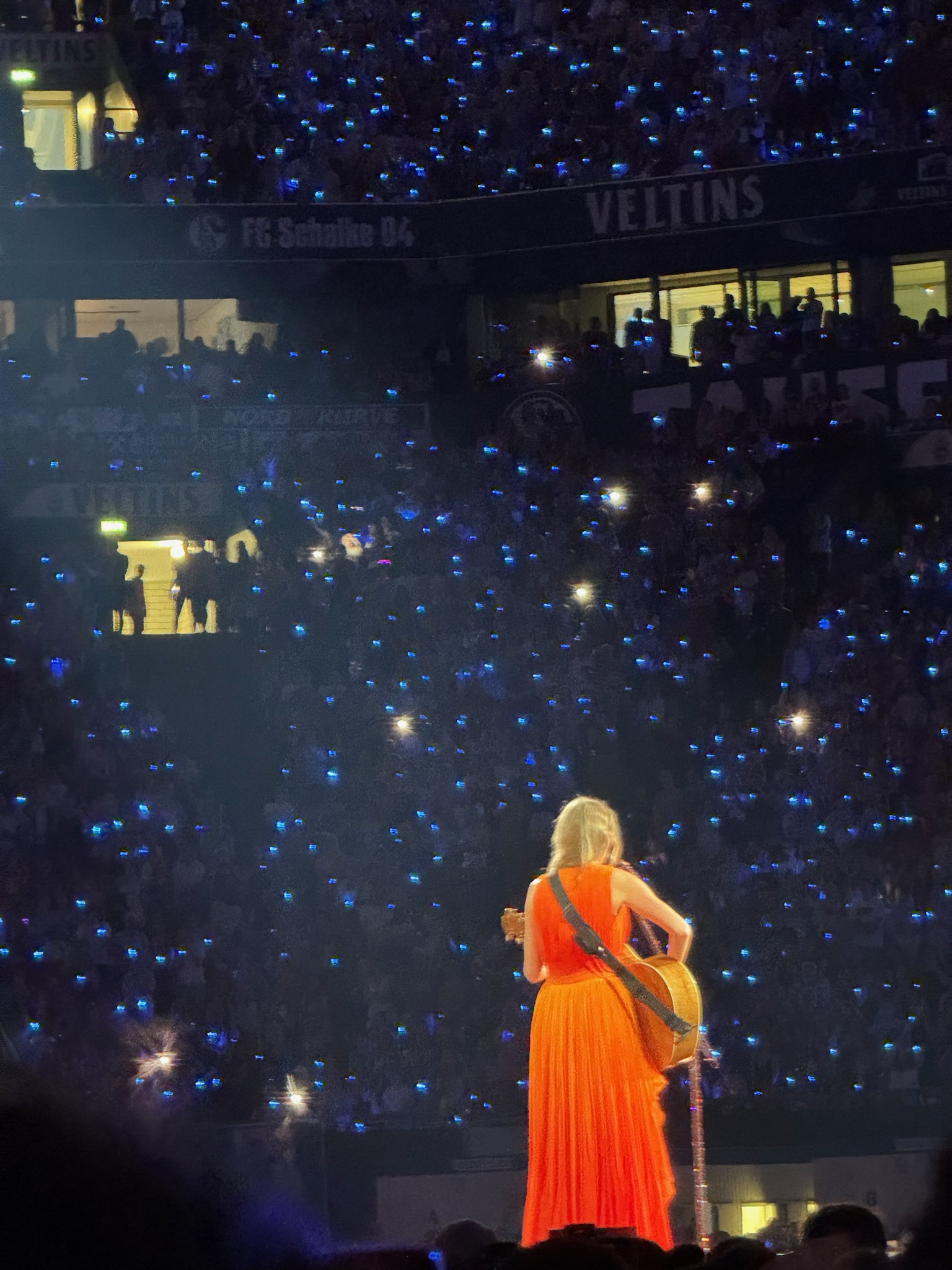
Swift performing "Invisible String" as a "surprise song" on the Eras Tour

The American singer-songwriter Taylor Swift conceived her eighth studio album, Folklore, while quarantining amidst the COVID-19 pandemic, with the producers Jack Antonoff and Aaron Dessner of the National. Swift developed songs from figments of mythopoeic visuals in her mind, a result of her imagination "running wild" while isolating herself. In a premise for Folklore that Swift posted on her social media, one such imagery was of "a single thread that, for better or for worse, ties you to your fate". Republic Records released Folklore on July 24, 2020, with no prior promotion; "Invisible String" is number 11 on the standard track listing.

"Invisible String" charted in Australia (19), Singapore (19), Canada (29), and Portugal (134). In the United States, the track peaked at number 37 on the Billboard Hot 100 and number 12 on the Rolling Stone Top 100. In the United Kingdom, it peaked at number 43 on the OCC's Audio Streaming Chart and received a silver certification from the British Phonographic Industry (BPI). In March 2023, Swift performed "Invisible String" as the opening song for the Folklore act at the first four concerts of her sixth headlining tour, the Eras Tour.

Starting from the March 31, 2023 show in Arlington, Texas, she replaced it with "The 1". In May 2023, in celebration of the Eras Tour's Nashville shows, Mayor John Cooper issued a proclamation recognizing "Taylor Swift homecoming" as Nashville was the city where Swift started her music career. The city installed a bench at Centennial Park with a plaque reading, "For Taylor Swift. A bench for you to read on at Centennial Park. Welcome home, Nashville;" it is a nod to the song's lyrics referencing the said park. To honor this, Swift performed "Invisible String" instead of "The 1" at the second show in Nashville. She performed it as a "surprise song" in a mashup with "Superstar" at the first show in Gelsenkirchen, on July 17, 2024.

== Production ==
"Invisible String"
A sample of "Invisible String" demonstrating the finger-picked strums and vocal backbeats

Swift wrote "Invisible String" with Dessner, who produced the song. Dessner composed "Invisible String" using finger-picked strums created by putting a rubber bridge on a guitar. He said that the rubber bridge "deadens the strings so that it sounds old" that created his vision of a folk song at its core. Dessner added a beat that resulted in what he called a "sneaky pop song"; Annie Zaleski from The A.V. Club characterized "Invisible String" as a folk song with "heart thump-steady vocal backbeats", while musicOMH's Chloe Johnson dubbed it a "chaotic clash" of folk, pop, and blues, with a song structure rooted in country music.

Several critics commented that the arrangement was spare but melodious and left room for Swift's conversational sing-speaking style. Jon Caramanica of The New York Times found the production "airy and earthy". Recorded at Dessner's Long Pond Studio in the Hudson Valley and La Gaîté Lyrique in Paris, France, "Invisible String" was mixed by Jonathan Low. According to Folklore's liner notes, Dessner played acoustic guitar, bass, electric guitar, Mellotron, percussion, piano, and synthesizer, and he programmed the drums with James McAlister. Dessner's brother Bryce was the orchestrator for cello (played by Clarice Jensen), viola and violin (Yuki Numata Resnick).

== Lyrics ==
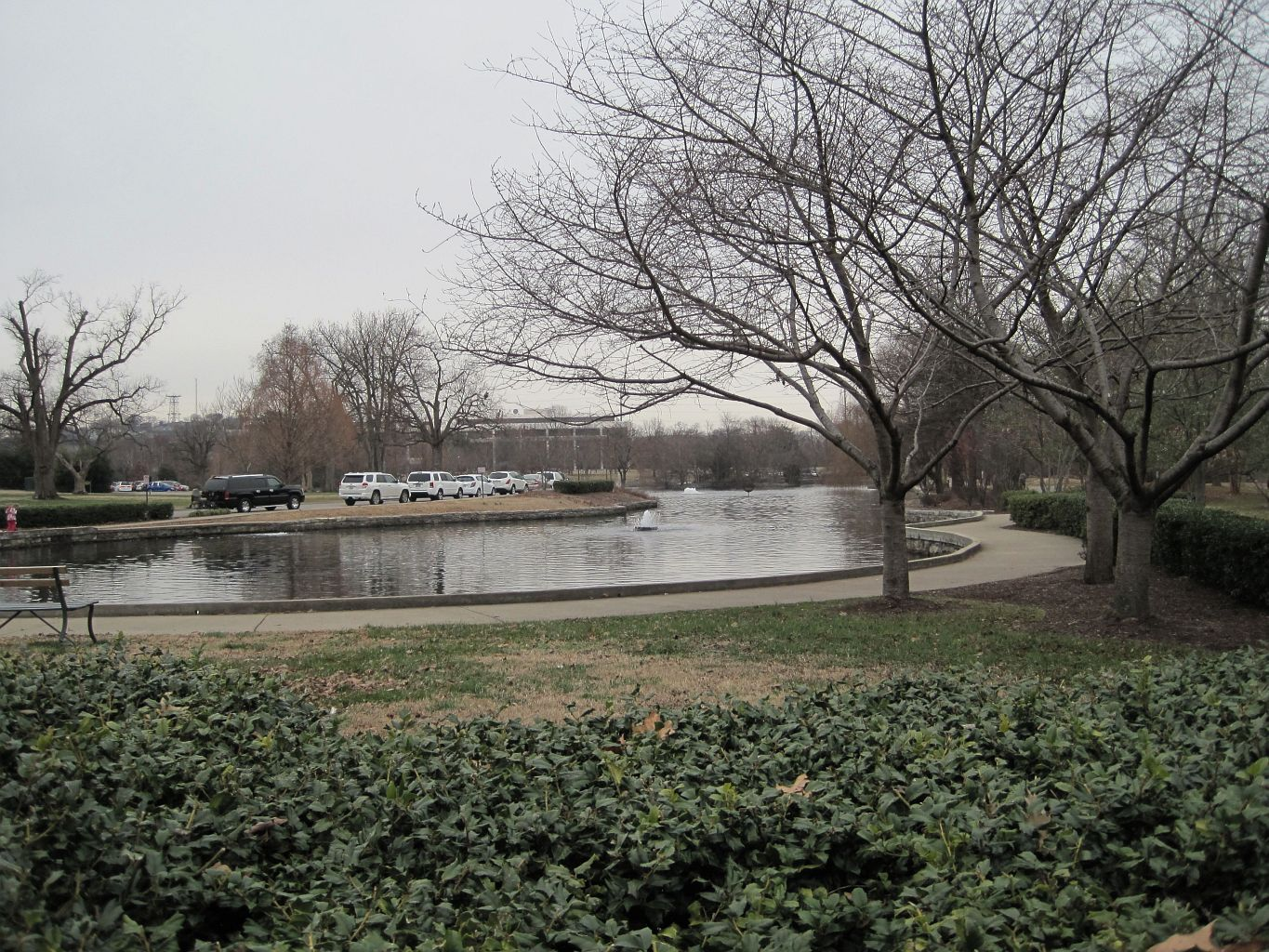
In "Invisible String", Swift mentions various personal details including her habit of reading at Centennial Park (pictured) in Nashville.

Although many Folklore songs explore fictitious narratives and characters, "Invisible String" employs autobiographical songwriting that alludes to Swift's personal life; some critics pointed out probable references to her romance with the English actor Joe Alwyn. In the lyrics, Swift's character describes how fate brings her to her soulmate after they each spent their separate lives throughout the years. Some critics considered "Invisible String" one of a few straightforward love songs on Folklore. Callie Ahlgrim from Insider thought that the title alluded to the East Asian mythology of the Red Thread of Fate.

The first verse recalls their lives before they met; the female narrator was a girl who used to read at Nashville's Centennial Park and dreamt of a romance there ("Green was the color of the grass where I used to read at Centennial Park"), and the male partner once wore a teal shirt and worked at a yoghurt shop as a young man. The second verse details how the two's lives intertwined without them knowing; Swift also alludes to her song "Bad Blood" and her publicized dispute with the singer Katy Perry: "Bad was the blood of the song in the cab/ On your first trip to LA/ You ate at my favorite spot for dinner." The next lines mention her trip to the Lake District in England ("Bold was the waitress on our three-year trip/ Getting lunch down by the Lakes/ She said I looked like an American singer"), a detail that is also on the Folklore bonus track "The Lakes".

The final verse references Swift's reputation and past relationships: "Cold was the steel of my ax to grind/ For the boys who broke my heart/ Now I send their babies presents." The chorus uses "invisible string" as a metaphor for love guided by happenstance: "And isn't it just so pretty to think/ All along there was some invisible string/ Tying you to me." The English literary professor Jonathan Bate said these lyrics referenced two literature classics: The Sun Also Rises (1926) by Ernest Hemingway ("Isn't it pretty to think so?") and Jane Eyre (1847) by Charlotte Brontë ("it is as if I had a string somewhere under my left ribs, tightly and inextricably knotted to a similar string situated in the corresponding quarter of your little frame"). Swift elaborates on this "invisible string" in the bridge, "A string that pulled me/ Out of all the wrong arms, right into that dive bar", referencing the "dive bar" mentioned in her 2018 single "Delicate".

== Critical reception ==
Music critics acclaimed the lyrics and theme of "Invisible String". Chris Willman of Variety commented that its theme added a "sweetness" to Folklore, whose other tracks mostly explored the dark and bittersweet feelings from unfulfilled romance. Caramanica said it was the only "truly hopeful-sounding song" on the album and contained some of Swift's most vivid lyrics. According to the New Statesman's critic Anna Leszkiewicz, "Invisible String" showcased a more intimate theme than other album tracks and was Folklore's "romantic high-point". In Slant Magazine, Jonathan Keefe lauded how the track employed "protracted metaphors" to convey Swift's "new peak in her command of language". Katie Moulton, writing for Consequence of Sound, picked "Invisible String" as an album essential and complimented that it demonstrated Swift's mature perspective with "piercing" lyricism. Jason Lipshutz of Billboard regarded it as the best Folklore track because it contained the "sumptuous intricacies" of Swift's songwriting and delivered an "emotional knockout" that had the potential to endure "within and outside" Swift's discography.

The song's production received similarly positive comments. Caramanica and Leszkiewicz found it to be restrained and nuanced, and Keefe lauded it as a masterful construct of song structure. PopMatters's Michael Sumsion described the guitar as "sky-bound plinking" that "bursts into an acoustic charge of pastoral loveliness". Pitchfork's Julian Mapes praised "Invisible String" as one of the "loveliest" songs on Folklore for its "delightfully plucky" instrumentals. Zaleski was impressed by Dessner's "ornate" arrangement that created a "sonic intimacy" highlighting Swift's vocals. In a similar vein, Lyndsey McKenna from NPR said Swift's vocals and the instrumentals, which resembled the music of the Nationals, were a "natural marriage". Lipshutz described Dessner's guitar and beats as "unfussy" that complemented the lyrics. Mikael Wood of the Los Angeles Times placed the song second on his ranking of all Folklore tracks; he deemed its lyricism "very cleverly phrased" and Swift's vocals "whimsical and luscious".

The editorial staff of Billboard collectively ranked "Invisible String" fourth in a 2022 list of Swift's select 100 tracks. The editor Becky Kaminsky wrote that the track showcased Swift's contentment in her personal life after the "trials and tribulations" of stardom, which was emotionally resonant for her audiences, both "those who have found their special someone" and "those still searching". Hannah Mylrea of NME placed the song at number 31 on a ranking of Swift's discography. NPR placed "Invisible String" at number 22 on their ranking of 100 best songs of 2020, for "all the beautiful detail, all the muscular melody and immaculately placed acoustic production details".

== Credits and personnel ==
Credits are adapted from the liner notes of Folklore.

- Taylor Swift – vocals, songwriter
- Aaron Dessner – producer, songwriter, recording engineer, acoustic guitar, bass, drum programming, Mellotron, electric guitar, percussion, piano, synthesizer
- Yuki Numata Resnick – viola, violin
- Clarice Jensen – cello
- James McAllister – drum programming
- Jonathan Low – mixing, recording engineer
- Randy Merrill – mastering engineer
- Kyle Resnick – engineer

== Charts ==
Chart performance for "Invisible String"
Chart (2020)	Peak position
Australia (ARIA)	19
Canada Hot 100 (Billboard)	29
Portugal (AFP)	134
Singapore (RIAS)	19
UK Audio Streaming (Official Charts)	43
US Billboard Hot 100	37
US Rolling Stone Top 100	12

== Certifications ==
Certifications for "Invisible String"
Region	Certification	Certified units/sales
Australia (ARIA)	Platinum	70,000^{‡}
Brazil (Pro-Música Brasil)	Platinum	40,000^{‡}
New Zealand (RMNZ)	Platinum	30,000^{‡}
United Kingdom (BPI)	Gold	400,000^{‡}
^{‡} Sales+streaming figures based on certification alone.
