= Exile (song) =

2020 single by Taylor Swift featuring Bon Iver

Single by Taylor Swift featuring Bon Iver

from the album Folklore
- Released: August 3, 2020
- Studio: Kitty Committee Studio (Los Angeles); April Base (Fall Creek)
- Genre: Indie folk
- Length: 4:45
- Label: Republic
- Songwriters: Taylor Swift; Joe Alwyn; Justin Vernon
- Producers: Aaron Dessner; Joe Alwyn

Taylor Swift singles chronology
"Cardigan" (2020)	"Exile" (2020)	"Betty" (2020)

Bon Iver singles chronology
"PDLIF" (2020)	"Exile" (2020)	"AUATC" (2020)

Lyric video
- "Exile" on YouTube

"Exile" is a song by the American singer-songwriter Taylor Swift featuring the American band Bon Iver. It is from Swift's eighth studio album, Folklore (2020). "Exile" was written by Swift, Joe Alwyn (under the pseudonym William Bowery), and Bon Iver's frontman Justin Vernon, with production by Aaron Dessner and Alwyn. Republic Records released the song to US alternative radio on August 3, 2020.

Depicting an imaginary narrative of two estranged lovers having an unspoken dialogue, "Exile" is a minimal, but cinematic, indie-folk ballad with gospel, orchestral and chamber pop elements, combining Swift's honeyed vocals and Vernon's deep baritone into a melancholic duet propelled by a plodding piano, swirling strings, and soaring harmonies. Upon release, "Exile" garnered widespread critical acclaim, with emphasis on the duo's vocal chemistry, the agonizing lyricism, rich instrumentals and bleak atmosphere. Music critics picked it as a standout on Folklore and named it one of Swift's best collaborations to date, comparing it to her 2011 track "Safe & Sound". Several publications listed "Exile" as one of the best songs of 2020.

Commercially, "Exile" reached top-tier chart positions in various countries. It debuted at number six on the Billboard Hot 100, giving Swift her 28th top ten entry and eighteenth top ten debut in the United States. Elsewhere, it landed inside the top five in Australia, Ireland and New Zealand; top ten in Canada, Malaysia, Singapore and the United Kingdom; top 20 in Estonia, Israel and Scotland; and top 40 in Belgium, Portugal and Sweden. The song also became Bon Iver's highest-charting song and first top-ten song in all of the countries in which it charted. "Exile" was nominated for Best Pop Duo/Group Performance at the 63rd Annual Grammy Awards.

== Background and release ==
All tracks on Folklore, the eighth studio album by the American singer-songwriter Taylor Swift, were conceived as imageries and visuals from Swift's deep subconscious, a result of her imagination "running wild" while isolating herself during the COVID-19 pandemic; "Exile" rose out of one such imagery— an exiled man, who is "walking the bluffs of a land that isn't his own, wondering how it all went so terribly, terribly wrong".

Upon release, the song featured a songwriting credit from William Bowery, who had no online presence, and thus, was presumed to be a pseudonym. Swift later revealed that Bowery was actually a pseudonym for her then boyfriend, the English actor Joe Alwyn, who wrote the song's piano melody and Bon Iver's first verse. "Exile" was then developed into a rough demo of a duet in which Swift was singing both the male and female parts, and she sent it to the American musician Aaron Dessner—one of two producers Swift picked for Folklore. Dessner developed a piano template of the song with Swift's rerecorded vocals. Swift and Dessner went through several candidates for the male partner on the duet, and Swift favored the voice of Bon Iver's frontman Justin Vernon, who is also, along with Dessner, a part of the American indie band Big Red Machine. Dessner forwarded the song to Vernon, who enjoyed the song, contributed his own lyrics and recorded his part.

The album was released on July 24, 2020. "Exile" impacted US Adult Alternative radio as a single on August 3. A clip of the song’s performance from Folklore: The Long Pond Studio Sessions was released on YouTube on November 25. The song was also included in Swift's streaming compilations Folklore: The Escapism Chapter and Folklore: The Sleepless Nights Chapter, released on August 20 and August 23, 2020, respectively.

== Composition and lyrics ==
"Exile"
A sample of the third chorus in "Exile", where Swift's tender vocals blend with Vernon's deep baritone, surrounded by a dense arrangement of stomping piano gongs and dramatic strings.

"Exile" is a minimal, indie-folk ballad, with gospel, orchestral pop and chamber pop influences. Lyrically, it discusses two estranged lovers discussing their former relationship, in which one has not moved on (sung by Vernon), while the other one (Swift) has. Vernon delivers a "growling" vocal performance while "bemoaning a betrayed love", as Swift portrays the lover over "honeyed yet crisp" vocals. The duo's vocal range in the song spans between B_{1} to E♭_{5}.The song is written in the key of G♭ major and has a slow tempo of 76 beats per minute. The soaring instrumentals contain stirring strings and a plodding piano.

The song is a melancholic duet that fuses Swift's soft vocals with Vernon's low-register baritone, serving as an unarticulated conversation between two former lovers, setting forth their lack of communication. This thematic aspect reflects in the melody and lyrics of "Exile" as well: Melodically, the song is characterized by two voices in counterpoint—alternating while remaining as separate melodies. Similarly, the lyricism is structured after a call-and-response format, seeing Swift and Vernon singing over each other rather than fully listening and responding to each other, giving the song an argumentative tone with no fruitful end. The looped piano starts off "Exile", which then grows into a climax of chorused vocals, "glorious" harmonies and synths, mimicking the rising heat in the estranged lovers' conversation. "Exile" drew comparisons to Swift's older songs: "The Last Time" (2013) from her fourth studio album, Red, and "Safe & Sound" (2011) from The Hunger Games: Songs from District 12 and Beyond. Like the majority of Folklore, "Exile" also infuses a cinematic quality to its lyrics evoking visuals that allude to films, such as in the lines "I think I've seen this film before / and I didn't like the ending". The song starts with the male lover looking out at the female in a ballroom, where she is in the company of another man ("I can see you standing, honey/ With your arms around his body") as he ruminates on her leaving him alone with his feelings. In the verse following the first chorus, we see that the female lover is aware of his presence in the room, but has no feelings for him. The song crescendos into the lovers arguing about how the female offered so many cues as to how the male could do better, but he never noticed it. The song ultimately ends on a sad note, and both lovers decide that their relationship was one-sided, and the song concludes.

== Critical reception ==
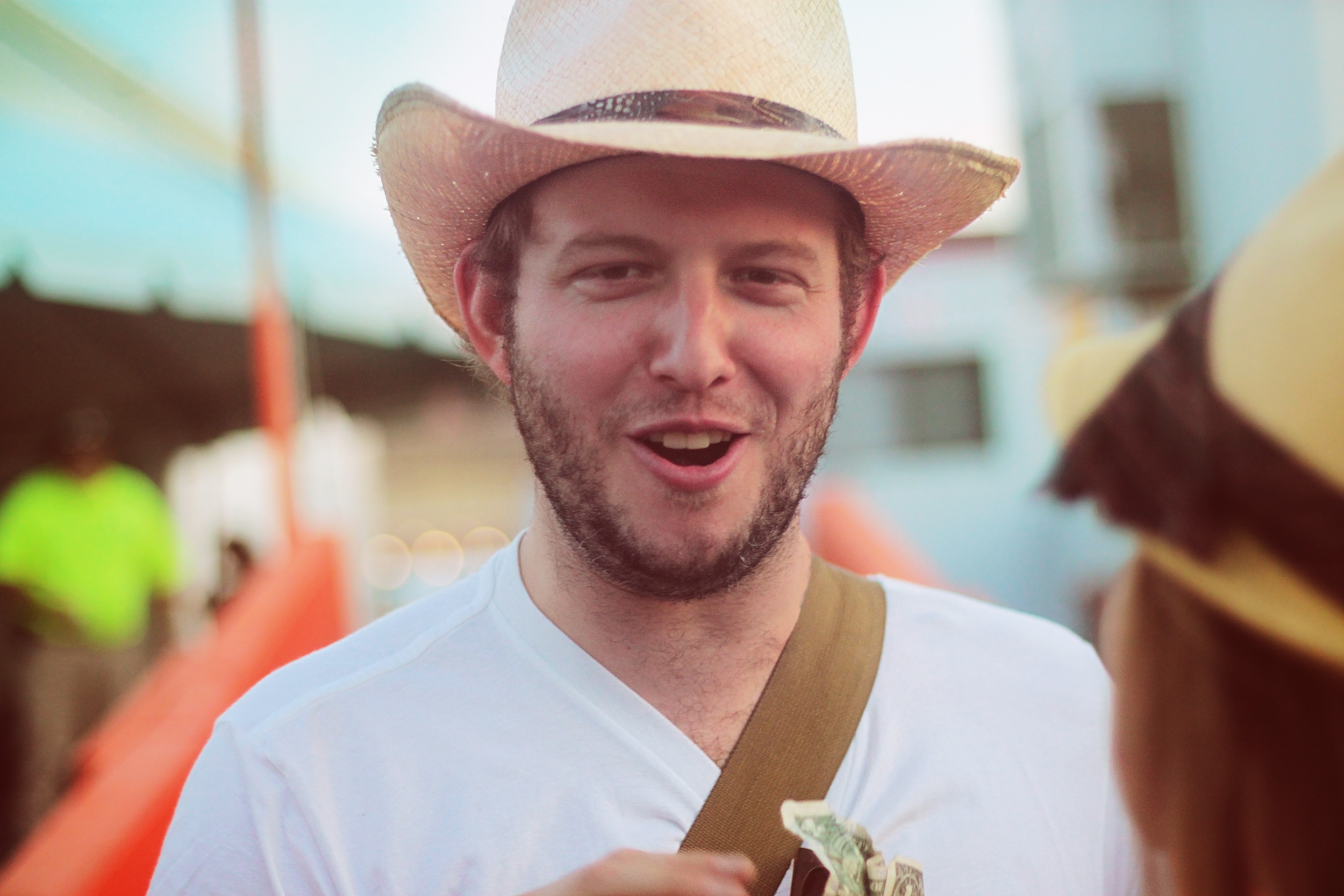
"Exile" was met with rave reviews from music critics, who admired the unexpected pairing of Swift with Justin Vernon (pictured), the lead singer of Bon Iver.

The song received widespread critical acclaim upon release. E! Online's Billy Nilles described "Exile" as a "devastating dream" that "hits like a punch to the gut". Praising the song's passion and conversational lyricism, Clash writer Valerie Magan called the song a "scintillating" duet and "a wintry, tortured monster of a song" that best showcases the "sonic beauty" of Folklore. Writing for Consequence of Sound, Matt Melis named "Exile" the Song of the Week upon the album's release, and called the duo's pairing a "minor miracle in 2020". Reviewing for the same publication, Katie Moulton stated that "Exile" portrays a "dissolving" romance with two voices in counterpoint, and remarked the lyrics as "clever but restrained" with maturity, observing the song's emotions to be "not only high-pitched" but possessing "complex, shifting depths".

Christopher Roberts of Under the Radar included it in his list of the nine best songs of Folklore's release week; he noted that Swift and Vernon's voices "mesh together well" and the latter sounds like Peter Gabriel on the track. Jon Caramanica of The New York Times dubbed "Exile" a "lovely, anguished duet" that acts a "stark and unsettling back and forth of recriminations", with lyrics channeling distance and skepticism. He complimented the song's climax especially, where Swift and Vernon sing over each other in a style of "hard-whiskey country, desperate R&B and black-box-theater dialogue", making the listeners feel "the full emotional corrosion". Caramanica described the piano in the song as stern and fatalistic, gonging like grandfather clocks.

Michael Sumsion of PopMatters proclaimed "Exile" an "obvious standout" on Folklore, defining it as a mournful examination of dissolution that juxtaposes Vernon's low bass register with Swift's "mid-range, conversational cadences and sharp-eyed observation to thrilling effect". He noted that the song begins as a "plaintive hush", growing into "a gleaming swarm of orchestral-gospel-flavored testifying that suggests the physical space of a cathedral", all whilst radiating a rich swell. Sumsion commented that "Exile" could easily fit on I, I, Bon Iver's fourth studio album. Los Angeles Times's Jody Rosen deemed the song a "stormy duet" and "a tortured call-and-response between estranged lovers", adding that the song hits hard because of its essence of reality. Justin Curto of Vulture opined that Swift has been productive in the pandemic, creating her most contemplative album yet, with "Exile" as a prime result.

Terming it "a rich, textured track" of two "unlikely" voices together in "glorious" harmony, Giselle Au-Nhien Nguyen of The Sydney Morning Herald found the song's mythology mesmerising, building "a whole world in under five minutes", and wrote that the effect erects a climax that dies down again, resulting in "a spectrum of sound and emotion" that resonates across Folklore. Uproxx writer Philip Cosores regarded Vernon sounding "like himself" a flex, as he avoids his characteristic falsetto present in Bon Iver's music. Bobby Olivier of Spin picked the track as "the grandest highlight" of Folklore, complimenting the production as a "sweeping, cinematic panorama". He further named it one of Swift's "most arresting" collaborations to date and a "worthy successor" to her 2011 collaboration, "Safe & Sound". NPR's Kim Ruehl thought that the song creates a "windswept sonic landscape", conveying "overlapping" sadness and sagacity, atypical of Swift's most radio hits. The Independent critic Ed Power lauded "Exile" as a Folklore highlight, boosted by "Swift and Vernon's stormy chemistry"; He underscored the former's "steely earnestness" and the latter's "enigmatic presence", and regarded the song the "millennial equivalent" of "Islands in the Stream" (1983) by Dolly Parton and Kenny Rogers.

=== Best-of lists ===
Elle named the song as the second-best of 2020, while Men's Health included it in its ranking of best 25 songs of 2020. NME writer Hannah Mylrea placed the song at number 20 on her list ranking all 161 songs by Swift, praising it as one of Swift's most impressive collaborations. Laura Paterson, editor at Vogue, listed "Exile" as one of the 29 best songs of 2020, and called it "the melancholic duo that 2020 deserved", merging "an angsty, sing-your-guts-out Taylor anthem" with "mid-2000s nostalgia for the folksy sounds of Bon Iver". Surprised by a Swift-Vernon duet, NBHAP named the song the eleventh best of 2020, and welcomed Vernon's return to his "pure and deep voice". Slant named "Exile" as the fourth-best song of 2020. Complex critic Aia Adriano placed "Exile" at number 4 on her list ranking the best songs of 2020. In August 2022, Billboard ranked all of Swift's 29 collaborations with other artists, placing "Exile" first.

== Commercial performance ==
The song reached high positions in many countries worldwide. In the United States, "Exile" debuted at number six on the Billboard Hot 100, giving Swift her twenty-eighth top-ten hit and Bon Iver its first. The song is one of Swift's record-extending eighteen top-ten debuts on the chart. Marking both Swift's and Bon Iver's first appearance on Billboard Adult Alternative Songs airplay chart, "Exile" debuted at number 37 on the chart dated August 15, 2020. It debuted at number two on Billboard Hot Rock & Alternative Songs chart and placed number five in its second week—the smallest drop of any of Swift's songs on the chart; Billboard opined that "the budding airplay could bode well for "Exile" in terms of chart longevity". The song was one of three Billboard Hot 100 top-ten hits from Folklore and its third-highest peaking track on the chart, behind "Cardigan" (number one) and "The 1" (number four). "Exile" also debuted at number five on the Billboard Digital Song Sales chart. It reached number 10 on Billboard Adult Alternative Songs, giving Swift her first top-ten entry on the chart.

The song reached number three in Australia's ARIA Singles, Irish Singles, Malaysia's RIM Singles, and Singapore Top 30 Digital Streaming charts; number five in New Zealand Top 40 Singles chart; number six on Canadian Hot 100; number eight on UK Singles; 17 on Israel's Media Forest and Scottish Singles; 32 on Denmark's Hitlisten; 37 on Belgium's Ultratop 50; 38 on Sweden's Sverigetopplistan charts; and number 40 on Portugal's AFP Top 200 Singles chart. In Australia and Malaysia, "Exile" was one of five tracks from Folklore to land in the top ten. In Ireland, it was one of three songs from Folklore to chart in the top ten, increasing Swift's total of Irish top-ten hits to 15. In the UK, "Exile" debuted in the top ten alongside "Cardigan" and "The 1", making Swift the sixth artist in the UK history to chart three songs in the top ten simultaneously and the first to debut three in the region; this extended Swift's UK top-ten hits total to 16.

Seven weeks after the release of Folklore, the Billboard Global 200 chart was inaugurated, on which "Exile" appeared at number 133 on the week of September 19, 2020.

== Accolades ==
"Exile" was nominated for Best Pop Duo/Group Performance at the 63rd Annual Grammy Awards, becoming Swift's third nomination in the category, after "Breathe" featuring Colbie Caillat (2008) and "Bad Blood" featuring Kendrick Lamar (2015).

Awards and nominations for "Exile"
Ceremony	Year	Award	Result	Ref.
AMFT Awards	2020	Best Folk Performance	Won	
Grammy Awards	2021	Best Pop Duo/Group Performance	Nominated	
GAFFA Awards	2021	International Hit of the Year	Shortlisted	
BMI London Awards	2022	Most Performed Songs of the Year	Won	

== Live performances and usage ==
Vernon brought out Swift at his Bon Iver concert at OVO Arena Wembley, London, on October 26, 2022. He surprised the crowd with Swift as a guest act, and they performed "Exile" for the first time in front of an audience. Dessner was also onstage during the performance. Swift performed "Exile" as a "surprise song" at SoFi Stadium on August 7, 2023, during her sixth headlining concert tour, the Eras Tour. In 2024, she sang the track two times as part of a mashup with her song "Haunted" (2010) on the Sydney and Edinburgh stops of the Eras Tour. She also sang the song in a mashup with her song "The Black Dog" (2024) at PGE Narodowy, Warsaw, on August 3, 2024, and in a mashup with her song "Cold as You" (2006) at Lucas Oil Stadium, Indianapolis, on November 1, 2024.

The English singer-songwriters Griff and Maisie Peters covered "Exile" for a YouTube special in December 2020. "Exile" is featured in the twelfth episode of the fourth season of the American medical drama series The Resident, and the final (tenth) episode of the third season of the American psychological thriller series You, where it soundtracks the end of Joe Goldberg and Love Quinn's marital life. The song eventually topped the Billboard Top TV Songs chart. The English indie pop band Bastille covered "Exile" on SiriusXM. "Exile" is featured in the season finale of season two of The Summer I Turned Pretty.

== Credits and personnel ==
Credits adapted from Tidal

- Taylor Swift – vocals, songwriter
- Justin Vernon – featured vocals, songwriter, vocal engineer
- Joe Alwyn (alias William Bowery) – songwriter, producer
- Aaron Dessner – producer, recording engineer, drum programmer, electric guitar, piano, percussion, synthesizer
- Rob Moose – violin, viola
- Laura Sisk – vocal engineer
- Jonathan Low – recording engineer, mixer
- Randy Merrill – mastering engineer

== Charts ==
=== Weekly charts ===
Chart (2020)	Peak position
Australia (ARIA)	3
Austria (Ö3 Austria Top 40)	56
Belgium (Ultratop 50 Flanders)	37
Canada Hot 100 (Billboard)	6
Czech Republic Singles Digital (ČNS IFPI)	68
Denmark (Tracklisten)	32
Estonia (Eesti Tipp-40)	19
France (SNEP Sales Chart)	69
Global 200 (Billboard)	133
Greece (IFPI)	59
Hong Kong (HKRIA)	8
Ireland (IRMA)	3
Israel (Media Forest)	18
Malaysia (RIM)	3
Netherlands (Single Top 100)	84
New Zealand (Recorded Music NZ)	5
Portugal (AFP)	40
Scottish Singles Sales (Official Charts)	17
Spain (PROMUSICAE)	83
Singapore (RIAS)	3
Sweden (Sverigetopplistan)	38
Switzerland (Schweizer Hitparade)	48
UK Singles (Official Charts)	8
US Billboard Hot 100	6
US Adult Alternative Airplay (Billboard)	9
US Hot Rock & Alternative Songs (Billboard)	2
US Rolling Stone Top 100	3

=== Monthly charts ===
Chart (2021)	Peak position
US Top TV Songs (Billboard)	1

=== Year-end charts ===
Chart (2020)	Position
US Hot Rock & Alternative Songs (Billboard)	13
Chart (2021)	Position
US Hot Rock & Alternative Songs (Billboard)	51

== Certifications ==
Certifications for "Exile"
Region	Certification	Certified units/sales
Australia (ARIA)	4× Platinum	280,000^{‡}
Brazil (Pro-Música Brasil)	2× Platinum	80,000^{‡}
Canada (Music Canada)	2× Platinum	160,000^{‡}
Denmark (IFPI Danmark)	Platinum	90,000^{‡}
France (SNEP)	Gold	100,000^{‡}
Italy (FIMI)	Gold	50,000^{‡}
New Zealand (RMNZ)	2× Platinum	60,000^{‡}
Norway (IFPI Norway)	Gold	30,000^{‡}
Poland (ZPAV)	Gold	25,000^{‡}
Spain (Promusicae)	Platinum	60,000^{‡}
United Kingdom (BPI)	Platinum	600,000^{‡}
United States (RIAA)	Platinum	1,000,000^{‡}
^{‡} Sales+streaming figures based on certification alone.

== Release history ==
Release date and format
Region	Date	Format	Label	Ref.
United States	August 3, 2020	Triple A radio	Republic	

== See also ==
- List of Billboard Hot 100 top-ten singles in 2020
- List of UK top-ten singles in 2020
- List of top 10 singles in 2020 (Australia)
- List of top 10 singles in 2020 (Ireland)
