= The Lakes (song) =

2020 song by Taylor Swift

Promotional single by Taylor Swift

from the album Folklore (Deluxe Edition)
- Released: July 24, 2021
- Recorded: 2020
- Studio: Kitty Committee (Los Angeles); Rough Customer (New York City)
- Genre: Folk
- Length: 3:31
- Label: Republic
- Songwriters: Taylor Swift; Jack Antonoff
- Producers: Taylor Swift; Jack Antonoff

Lyric video
- "The Lakes" on YouTube

"The Lakes" (stylized in all lowercase) is a song by the American singer-songwriter Taylor Swift, taken from the deluxe edition of her eighth studio album, Folklore (2020). Written and produced by Swift and Jack Antonoff, "The Lakes" is a midtempo indie ballad, set to acoustic guitar and strings, with themes of introspection and escapism that reflect on Swift's semi-retirement in Windermere, in the English Lake District.

An orchestral version of "The Lakes", which is the original demo, was released as a promotional single by Republic Records on July 24, 2021, to commemorate the first anniversary of Folklore. 7-inch singles of "The Lakes" were exclusively sold in independent record shops on April 23, 2022, as part of the 2022 Record Store Day limited-edition vinyl releases.

Upon release, "The Lakes" received universal acclaim from music critics, with compliments on its sophisticated, poetic lyrics, and melancholic instrumentals; many named it a highlight on Folklore and one of the best songs of Swift's discography. The song debuted in the top 10 of the Canadian Digital Song Sales and US Digital Song Sales charts; elsewhere, it peaked at number 21 in Scotland and on the UK Singles Downloads Chart and at number 27 in Hungary.

== Background and composition ==
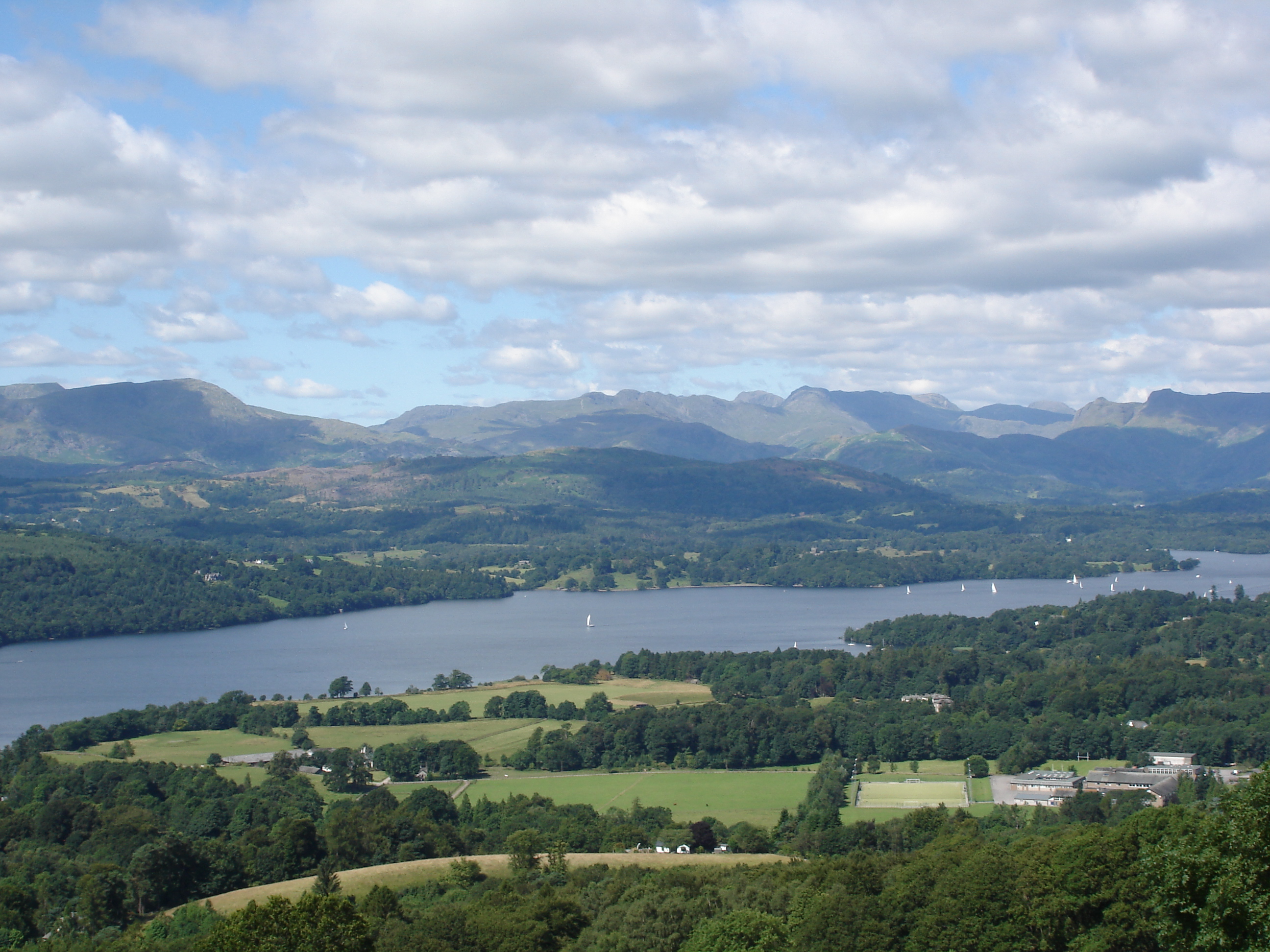
An aerial view of Windermere, one of "The Lakes" Swift sings about in the song

Taylor Swift began work on her eighth studio album, Folklore, during the COVID-19 lockdowns in early 2020. She enlisted Jack Antonoff, who had worked on her three previous studio albums, as a producer on the album. Swift wrote and produced five songs with Antonoff, including "The Lakes." Due to the lockdown, they were separated and therefore created Folklore by exchanging digital files. Antonoff initially envisioned "The Lakes" as a "big orchestral" song, but was asked to scale the production down by Swift. The song is a melodramatic, midtempo indie ballad driven by acoustic guitar, with lush orchestration heavily laden with strings and a "euphoric" crescendo of violins. Swift's vocal range in the song spans between D_{3} to F♯_{4}. The song is written in the key of D major and has a tempo of 90 beats per minute.

The poetic lyrics see Swift introspecting on her semi-retirement near Windermere, located in England's Lake District. Swift fantasizes about a red rose growing out of tundra "with no one around to tweet it", indicating her idea of a utopia free of social media, feuds, and urban settings, getting away from society, her critics and detractors, and finding solace with her lover in the wilderness, like the Lake Poets. The songwriting exudes a depressive tone coupled with escapism, with references to Wisteria, a genus of flowering plants, and William Wordsworth, the 19th-century English poet who is recognized for his Romantic works. Aaron Dessner, Swift's collaborator on Folklore, stated the song uses hints of tragic Greek poetry, and feels like getting "lost in a beautiful garden." Mainstream media has surmised the song's subject, whom Swift refers to as "muse" and "beloved", to be her then boyfriend and British actor Joe Alwyn. The lyric "I've come too far to watch some namedropping sleaze" is interpreted as a subtle hint at her publicized disputes with Kanye West and Scooter Braun.

== Release and promotion ==
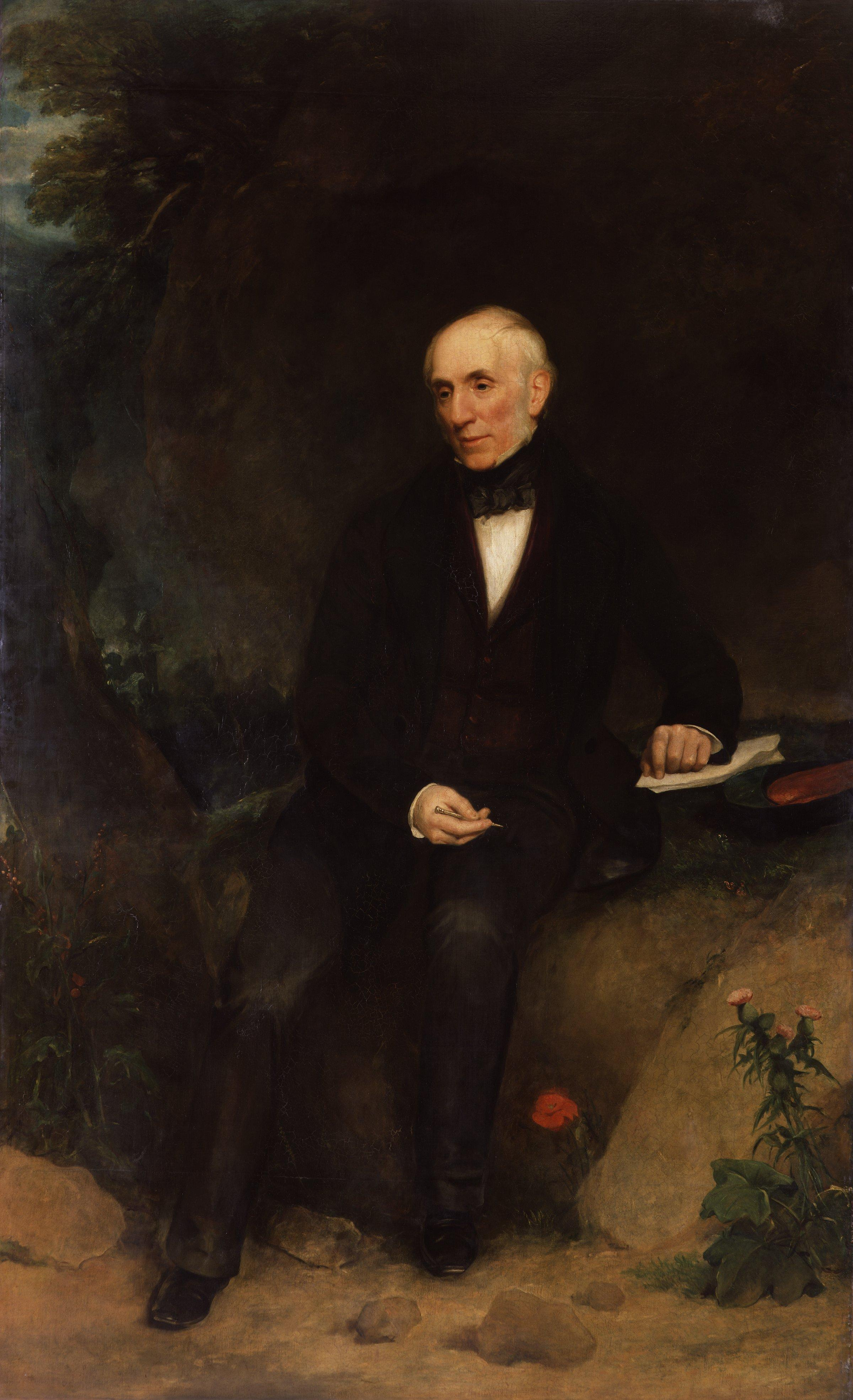
William Wordsworth, the 19th-century English poet known for his Romantic works, is referenced in the lyric "tell me what are my words worth"—a pun on his name.

"The Lakes" was originally released as an exclusive to the deluxe editions of Folklore, which were issued on August 7, 2020. On August 18, it was made available on digital and streaming platforms on August 18, 2020, along with a lyric video published to Swift's YouTube channel. An orchestral version was released to all music platforms on July 24, 2021, the first anniversary of Folklore. It is a few seconds longer than the album version of "The Lakes"; Swift tweeted: "It's been 1 year since we escaped the real world together and imagined ourselves someplace simpler. With tall trees & salt air. Where you can wear lace nightgowns that make you look like a Victorian ghost & no one will side eye you cause no one is around. To say thank you for all you have done to make this album what it was, I wanted to give you the original version of "The Lakes". Happy 1 year anniversary to Rebekah, (Note: American philanthropist Rebekah Harkness is the subject of the third track on Folklore, "The Last Great American Dynasty".) Betty, Inez, James, Augustine (Note: Betty, Inez, James, and Augustine are the fictional characters described in the love triangle storyline narrated in the Folklore tracks "Cardigan", "August", and "Betty"; the first three characters are named after the daughters of the American actress Blake Lively and the Canadian actor Ryan Reynolds. Augustine is the narrator of "August". Her name is not mentioned in the song or anywhere in the album, but Swift stated she began to call her so.) and the stories we all created around them. Happy Anniversary, Folklore."

On April 23, 2022, for the Record Store Day, 10,000 limited-edition vinyl records of songs by various artists were exclusively sold in independent record shops; these included a 7-inch copy of "The Lakes", containing both the album version (on the A-side) and the original demo (B-side). On June 2, 2023, Swift performed "The Lakes" in Chicago during the surprise song segment of the Eras Tour. Subsequently, she sang the track on June 18, 2024 as part of a mashup with her song, "I Hate It Here" in Cardiff.

== Commercial performance ==
After the release of the deluxe edition of Folklore, "The Lakes" debuted at number five on the Billboard Digital Song Sales chart and at number 18 on Billboard Bubbling Under the Hot 100 chart with three days of tracking. It also reached the top 20 on the New Zealand Top 40 Singles and Canadian Digital Song Sales charts, and the top 30 on Hungarian Singles, Scottish Singles and the UK Singles Downloads Chart charts. Following its vinyl release in April 2022, "The Lakes" debuted at number 88 in the United Kingdom and number 52 in Ireland.

== Critical reception ==
The song received universal critical acclaim. NME critic Hannah Mylrea opined that "The Lakes" is more poetic and romantic than any song on the standard edition of Folklore, and praised the song as "allusive". Rolling Stone's Brittany Spanos wrote that the song channels Romantic-era poetry, by depicting unconditional love "within a controversial life and painful experiences". In agreement, Wren Graves, writing for Consequence of Sound, also found the song to be Romantic, inspired by "one of the great periods in English literature". Tom Breihan, writing for Stereogum, called it a "soft, small-scale" love song about avoiding the public eye and "finding escape in some secluded enclave".

"The Lakes"
A sample of the orchestral intro in the album version of "The Lakes". The song prominently incorporates string instruments, which critics described as "lushly produced" and "serenading".

Billboard writer Gil Kaufman found "The Lakes" delightful, and complimented the sparse instrumentals, while Josiah Hughes of Exclaim! commended its "lush and elaborately produced" indie sound. Sarah Carson, reviewing for i, lauded Swift's "smart" wordplay and "dazzlingly novel" vocals, which she described as "soft, distinct, imperfect, and never so assured". Idolator's Mike Wass labelled it a "dreamy anthem." Complimenting Swift's vulnerability and honesty, Sputnikmusic praised "The Lakes" as "an ideal product of its time", naming it one of the best songs Swift has ever written, and asserted it as the perfect closing track to Folklore. Gary Dinges of USA Today deemed the song a "serenade," mimicking a bittersweet version of Swift's 2017 song "Call It What You Want". Also comparing to "Call It What You Want", Glamour commentator Emily Tannenbaum defined the song as a melancholic love letter, and highlighted its macabre nature.

== Credits and personnel ==
Credits adapted from the album's liner notes.

- Taylor Swift – vocals, songwriter, producer
- Jack Antonoff – producer, songwriter, recording engineer, live drums, live percussion, drum programming, electric guitar, keyboards, piano, background vocals
- Evan Smith – saxophone, clarinet, flute, keyboards, bass
- Bobby Hawk – strings
- Mike Williams – recording engineer
- John Gautier – recording engineer
- Jonathan Low – mixing engineer
- Laura Sisk – vocal engineer
- Randy Merrill – mastering engineer

== Charts ==
Weekly chart performance for "The Lakes"
Chart (2020–2022)	Peak position
Australia Digital Song Sales (Billboard)	7
Canadian Digital Song Sales (Billboard)	9
France (SNEP Sales Chart)	55
Hungary (Single Top 40)	27
Ireland (IRMA)	52
New Zealand Hot Singles (RMNZ)	13
Scottish Singles Sales (Official Charts)	21
UK Singles (Official Charts)	88
US Bubbling Under Hot 100 (Billboard)	18
US Digital Song Sales (Billboard)	5

== Certifications ==
Certification for "The Lakes"
Region	Certification	Certified units/sales
Australia (ARIA)	Platinum	70,000^{‡}
Brazil (Pro-Música Brasil)	Gold	20,000^{‡}
New Zealand (RMNZ)	Gold	15,000^{‡}
United Kingdom (BPI)	Silver	200,000^{‡}
^{‡} Sales+streaming figures based on certification alone.

== Release history ==
Release dates and formats for "The Lakes"
Region	Date	Format(s)	Version(s)	Label	Ref.
Various	July 24, 2021	Digital download; streaming	Original (Note: The official version of "The Lakes" is a bonus track on the deluxe edition of Folklore, which was released to digital music platforms on August 18, 2020. A demo version of "The Lakes", dubbed the "original version", which is longer and highly emphasized on its orchestral elements, was released on July 24, 2021, to commemorate the first anniversary of Folklore.)	Republic	
Various	April 23, 2022	7-inch vinyl	Official; original	Republic	
