= Hoax (song) =

2020 song by Taylor Swift

Song by Taylor Swift

from the album Folklore
- Written: c. July 2020
- Released: July 24, 2020
- Studio: Long Pond (Hudson Valley); Kitty Committee (Los Angeles)
- Length: 3:40
- Label: Republic
- Songwriters: Taylor Swift; Aaron Dessner
- Producer: Aaron Dessner

Lyric video
- "Hoax" on YouTube

"Hoax" is a song by the American singer-songwriter Taylor Swift from her eighth studio album, Folklore (2020). Swift wrote the track with its producer, Aaron Dessner, as the last track written for the album. A minimalist piano sentimental ballad and a chamber track, "Hoax" is about a flawed but everlasting relationship; Swift describes the details using motifs, religious imagery, and impressionistic storytelling.

Some music critics praised "Hoax" for its production and lyrical imagery, while others deemed it unremarkable. Commercially, the track reached the national charts of Australia, Canada, and the United States, and received certifications in Australia, Brazil, New Zealand, and the United Kingdom. Swift recorded a stripped-down rendition of "Hoax" as part of the documentary film Folklore: The Long Pond Studio Sessions and its live album in 2020, and performed it once on piano at the Eras Tour in 2024.

== Production and release ==
Taylor Swift began working on her eighth studio album, Folklore, during the COVID-19 lockdowns in early 2020. She let her imagination "run wild" during the isolation, resulting in a collection of imageries that became Folklore. Swift wrote the album's sixteenth track, "Hoax", with its producer, Aaron Dessner. It was the last track written for the album; Swift wrote its lyrics days before Folklore's release, and they both agreed that it should be included on the album. She advised Dessner not to "try to give it any other space other than what feels natural to [him]" before he developed its production. He recorded the track with its mixing engineer, Jonathan Low, at Long Pond Studio in the Hudson Valley, and additionally played acoustic guitar, electric guitar, OP-1, and synth bass. Laura Sisk recorded Swift's vocals at Kitty Committee Studio in Los Angeles, and Randy Merrill provided mastering at Sterling Sound Studios in New York City. Rob Moose served as the orchestrator and played violin and viola.

"Hoax" is the final track on the standard edition of Folklore, which was surprise-released on July 24, 2020. Swift recorded a stripped-down rendition of the track in September 2020 for the documentary film Folklore: The Long Pond Studio Sessions and its live album. On June 28, 2024, she performed "Hoax" on piano as part of a mashup with her song "Sweet Nothing" (2022) at the first Dublin show of the Eras Tour (2023–2024).

== Music and lyrics ==
"Hoax"
A sample of "Hoax", featuring a slow-paced piano instrumentation with guitars and muted strings

"Hoax" is three minutes and forty seconds long. It is a slow-paced piano sentimental ballad and a chamber track written in the waltz tempo. (Note: Attributed to the Los Angeles Times' Mikael Wood, Time's Raisa Bruner, The Observer's Kitty Empire, and NME's Hannah Mylrea.) The track incorporates a minimalist production, a downbeat arrangement, percussion, muted strings, and double-tracked vocals. Paste's Grace Byron described it as "blistering hymnal", and Slate's Carl Wilson thought that it evoked the "naked intimacy" of Joni Mitchell's music. The lyrics describe a flawed but everlasting relationship and the narrator's belief in a "faithless love". Swift details the messiness of the relationship using motifs, religious imagery, and impressionistic storytelling.

The first verse features lyrical references to other tracks in Swift's discography, such as "Holy Ground" ("This has frozen my ground") and "Look What You Made Me Do" ("My smoking gun"). According to Business Insider's Callie Ahlgrim, Swift compares the trauma of the backlash she experienced in 2016 to the suffering inflicted by the narrator's relationship with her partner ("You knew it still hurts underneath my scars/ From when they pulled me apart/ But what you did was just as dark"). The narrator demonstrates her commitment to her lover even through the toughest times ("Don't want no other shade of blue but you/ No other sadness in the world would do"). "Hoax" ends Folklore with a despondent note during the outro.

== Critical reception ==
Music critics generally praised "Hoax" for its production and lyrical imagery. Business Insider's Courtney Larocca called the song "sneakily brilliant", and Ahlgrim found much of the lyrics "beautiful and devastating"; they both lauded the lyricism and placed the song at number thirteen in their ranking of the album's seventeen tracks. Michael Sumsion from PopMatters lauded the production elements and Swift's vocal delivery as "convincing and textured". Punch Liwanag from Manila Bulletin picked the lyric "Don't want no other shade of blue but you/ No other sadness in the world would do" as one of Folklore's lines that evoke an imagery and its corresponding emotion, while Hannah Yasharoff and David Oliver from USA Today deemed the lyric "Your faithless love's the only hoax I believe in" one of the best lyrics in Swift's discography.

Some critics considered "Hoax" and its narrative unremarkable. NME's Hannah Mylrea deemed it the least memorable track on Folklore, and Pitchfork's Jill Mapes regarded it as one of Folklore's songs that "could use some selective pruning". John Wohlmacher from Beats Per Minute dubbed the track "disappointingly clinical", while Mikael Wood of the Los Angeles Times considered the narrative unremarkable. Teen Vogue's P. Claire Dodson deemed "Hoax" an "odd" closing track: "It's not a breathless fresh start, but it is a promise." "Hoax" appeared in rankings of Swift's discography by Mylrea (116 out of 161), Vulture's Nate Jones (69 out of 245), and Rolling Stone's Rob Sheffield (117 out of 286).

== Commercial performance ==
"Hoax" reached the national charts of Australia (43) and Canada (51); the former's Australian Recording Industry Association gave it a platinum certification for surpassing 70,000 track-equivalent units. In the United States, the song reached number 13 on the Rolling Stone Top 100 chart and number 71 on the Billboard Hot 100 chart. It additionally entered at number 14 on the Billboard Hot Rock & Alternative chart, where it stayed for nine weeks and appeared at number 62 on the chart's 2020 year-end. The track peaked at number 62 on the Audio Streaming chart in the United Kingdom. "Hoax" received gold certifications in Brazil and New Zealand, and a silver certification in the United Kingdom.

== Personnel ==
Credits are adapted from the liner notes of Folklore.

- Taylor Swift – songwriter
- Aaron Dessner – songwriter, producer, piano, acoustic guitar, electric guitar, OP-1, synth bass, recording engineer
- Jonathan Low – mixing engineer, recording engineer
- Laura Sisk – vocal recording engineer
- Randy Merrill – mastering engineer
- Rob Moose – orchestrator, viola, violin

== Charts ==
=== Weekly charts ===
Weekly chart performance for "Hoax"
Chart (2020)	Peak position
Australia (ARIA)	43
Canada Hot 100 (Billboard)	51
UK Audio Streaming (Official Charts)	70
US Billboard Hot 100	71
US Hot Rock & Alternative Songs (Billboard)	14
US Rolling Stone Top 100	13

=== Year-end chart ===
Year-end chart performance of "Hoax"
Chart (2020)	Position
US Hot Rock & Alternative Songs (Billboard)	62

== Certifications ==
Certifications for "Hoax"
Region	Certification	Certified units/sales
Australia (ARIA)	Platinum	70,000^{‡}
Brazil (Pro-Música Brasil)	Gold	20,000^{‡}
New Zealand (RMNZ)	Gold	15,000^{‡}
United Kingdom (BPI)	Silver	200,000^{‡}
^{‡} Sales+streaming figures based on certification alone.
