= Cardigan (song) =

2020 single by Taylor Swift

Single by Taylor Swift

from the album Folklore
- Written: 2020
- Released: July 24, 2020
- Recorded: 2020
- Studio: Kitty Committee (Los Angeles); Long Pond (Hudson Valley, New York)
- Genre: Soft rock; folk; indie rock
- Length: 4:00
- Label: Republic
- Songwriters: Taylor Swift; Aaron Dessner
- Producer: Aaron Dessner

Taylor Swift singles chronology
| "The Man" (2020) | "Cardigan" (2020) | "Exile" (2020) |

Music video
- "Cardigan" on YouTube

"Cardigan" (stylized in all lowercase) is a song by the American singer-songwriter Taylor Swift and the lead single from her eighth studio album, Folklore (2020). Republic Records released the song on July 24, 2020. Written by Swift and its producer, Aaron Dessner, "Cardigan" is a soft rock, folk, and indie rock ballad, with a stripped-down arrangement of a piano, drums, and violins.

The song's lyrics discuss a romance lost in memories, from the perspective of a female narrator named Betty, one of the several fictitious characters narrated in Folklore. An accompanying music video, written, directed, and styled by Swift, was released alongside the album launch. The video has been described as following a cottagecore aesthetic, featuring Swift in three different settings: a "cozy cabin" in the woods, a moss-covered forest, and a dark stormy sea, which represents the concept of the different phases in relationships. "Cardigan" was praised by music critics for its poetic songwriting and laid-back sound. It received nominations for Song of the Year and Best Pop Solo Performance at the 63rd Annual Grammy Awards. An acoustic version of the song, subtitled "Cabin in Candlelight", was also released.

Commercially, "Cardigan" debuted atop the global Spotify songs chart with over 7.742 million streams, which was, at that time, the biggest opening day for a song on the platform in 2020. With the song's debut at the number-one spot of the Billboard Hot 100 as well, Swift scored the sixth U.S. number-one single of her career. Along with Folklore's debut atop the Billboard 200 the same week, she became the first artist ever to simultaneously debut atop the Hot 100 and Billboard 200. "Cardigan" further topped the Hot Alternative Songs, Hot Rock & Alternative Songs, Streaming Songs, and Digital Song Sales charts, making Swift the first act in history to garner twenty chart-toppers on the latter. It reached number one in Australia, the top ten in Canada, Ireland, Malaysia, New Zealand, Singapore, and the United Kingdom, and the top 20 in Denmark, Estonia, Lithuania and Scotland.

== Production and release ==
Taylor Swift began work on her eighth studio album, Folklore, during the COVID-19 lockdowns in early 2020. She conceived the record as figments of mythopoeic visuals in her mind, as a result of her imagination "running wild" while isolating herself during lockdown. For the album's sound, Swift recruited Aaron Dessner and Jack Antonoff as producers on Folklore. Dessner produced or co-produced 11 tracks for the album and co-wrote nine with Swift. Much of the songs they worked on were originally Dessner's instrumental tracks that Swift would write the melody and lyrics over. Due to the lockdown, they were separated and had to send their work to each other via digital files to create the album.

"Cardigan" was the first song Swift and Dessner wrote in their collaboration for Folklore. It was based on one of Dessner's instrumentals called "Maple". On April 27, 2020, Aaron Dessner sent a folder of instrumentals to Swift that included it. After hearing "Maple", she sent a voice memo to him and they wrote the song in five hours. Dessner's brother Bryce added orchestration in the instrumental. "Cardigan" was recorded by Aaron Dessner and Jonathan Low at Long Pond in Hudson Valley. The vocals were recorded by Laura Sisk at Swift's home studio (Kitty Committee) in Los Angeles. The track was mixed by Low at Long Pond and mastered by Randy Merrill at Sterling Sound in New York.

On July 23, 2020, Swift announced Folklore and its release date at midnight. Out of the album's 16 songs, "Cardigan" is placed at number two. The song was released on July 24, alongside an accompanied music video posted on YouTube. "Cardigan" serves as the lead single for Folklore; Universal Music Group sent the track to Italian radio on July 27, and Republic Records serviced it on US pop and adult pop radio formats the next day. A demo version of the song subtitled "Cabin in Candlelight" was also released on July 30; it was an exclusive that lasted for a day.

== Music and lyrics ==
"Cardigan" is a wistful, slow-burning, soft rock, folk and indie rock song driven by a stripped-down arrangement of a tender piano and a clopping drum sample, over a moody atmosphere. It is written in the key of E♭ major and has a moderately fast tempo of 130 beats per minute. Swift's vocal range in the song spans from E♭_{3} to A♭_{4}. The lyrics display confidence, but are also "slightly embittered". Swift told her fans that "Cardigan" is about "a lost romance and why young love is often fixed so permanently within our memories". It is one of the three of the tracks on the album that depict the same love triangle from three different perspectives at different times in their lives, the other two being "August" and "Betty".

"Cardigan"
A sample of the first chorus in "Cardigan", presenting the mellow piano, hoofing drums, and Swift's bittersweet vocals

In the song, Swift sings from the perspective of a fictional character named Betty, who recalls the separation and enduring optimism of a relationship with someone named James. While promoting the limited-edition version of the single, Swift told fans that she sent the original songwriting voice memo to Aaron Dessner on April 27, 2020, after hearing the instrumental tracks he created. Roisin O'Connor of The Independent compared the song to "Call It What You Want" from Swift's sixth studio album, Reputation (2017), while Spin's Bobby Olivier compared it to "Wildest Dreams" from her fifth studio album, 1989 (2014).

== Critical reception ==
Upon release, the song received universal acclaim from critics. Callie Ahlgrim of Insider Inc. dubbed the lyrics of "Cardigan" as an "effective way to evoke young love and innocence lost", describing them as simple, sharp and extremely poignant. Pitchfork's Jillian Mapes wrote that the song's "overlapping details and central framing device—of a cardigan forgotten and found without a second thought—are pure Swift". Courteney Larocca of Insider Inc. opined that the song has cues of Lana Del Rey. Laura Snapes of The Guardian described the song as "cavernous and shimmering as a rock pool in a cave". Jill Gutowitz of Vulture.com characterized "Cardigan" as "adorable, and yet, again, hurtful".

Hannah Mylrea of NME defined the song as a "swirling amalgam" of gleaming production, swooning strings, flickering piano, and lyrics that exude pain from young love, and praised Swift's songwriting for "stunningly" conveying complex mixed emotions of hurt, jealousy and heartbreak in a "gorgeous" folk tune. Mylrea placed "Cardigan" at number four on her September 2020 list ranking all of Swift's 161 songs. Caragh Medlicott of Wales Arts Review deemed the song as "a resurgence of self-worth discovered, somewhat ironically, through the love of another". Uproxx's Philip Cosores stated that "Cardigan" is "rooted in the vivid details and melodic warmth that characterizes much of [Swift's] music". Entertainment Weekly's Maura Johnston felt the song's lyrics are "confident" but "slightly embittered", which she thought "pay off at the album's end". Billboard, on their list of 100 Best Songs of 2020, placed "Cardigan" at number 11, calling it "a lead single unlike anything Swift had released before." Emphasizing its "finest" storytelling, The Plain Dealer ranked the song number 6 on its list of best songs of 2020. Complex listed the song at number 21 on its ranking of the best songs of 2020, highlighting Swift's evolved songwriting.

== Commercial performance ==
On Spotify, "Cardigan" debuted with over 7.742 million streams, garnering the biggest opening day for any song in 2020. (Note: On August 22, 2020, BTS's "Dynamite" broke this record by a margin of 36,000 streams. "Cardigan" remained as 2020's biggest opening day for a song by a solo or female artist.) It remained atop of the chart for four consecutive days, as of July 27, 2020. Following the inauguration of Billboard Global 200 chart seven weeks after the release of Folklore, "Cardigan" appeared at number 77 on the chart, dated September 19, 2020.

On the US Billboard Hot 100, "Cardigan" debuted at number one, earning Swift her sixth number-one single in the country and second number-one debut, following "Shake It Off" (2014). This made Swift the first artist to debut at number-one on both the Hot 100 and Billboard 200 charts in the same week. The single was joined in the top-10 by fellow Folklore tracks "The 1" and "Exile", and increased Swift's number of top-10 songs to 28. Moreover, it extended her record as the woman with the most top-10 debuts to 18. In its opening week, "Cardigan" earned 34 million US streams, 12.7 million radio impressions and sold 71,000 digital downloads, debuting atop the Streaming Songs and Digital Song Sales charts dated August 8, 2020, further extending Swift's all-time record as the artist with the most number-ones on the Digital Song Sales chart to 20. In its second week on the Hot 100, "Cardigan" descended to number eight. Furthermore, the song also topped the Alternative Streaming Songs, Alternative Digital Song Sales, Hot Alternative Songs and Hot Rock & Alternative Songs charts.

In Australia, "Cardigan" debuted at number one on the ARIA Singles Chart, becoming Swift's sixth chart-topping single in the country, and her first chart-topping single since "Look What You Made Me Do" (2017). It was one of five songs that debuted in the top 10 in the country, making Folklore the album with the most top-10 songs of 2020 in the country. It also debuted at number two on New Zealand's Top 40 Singles chart, along with "The 1" and "Exile" in the top 10.

On the Canadian Hot 100, "Cardigan" peaked at number three, while in Ireland, the song debuted at number four on the Irish Singles Chart, accompanied by "Exile" and "The 1" in the top 10, bringing Swift's total Irish top-10 songs to 15. In the United Kingdom, the song entered at number six on the Official Singles Chart, opening with over 35,000 units. "Exile" and "The 1" also debuted in the top 10, taking Swift's total UK top-10s to sixteen, while making her the sixth woman in UK history to have three top-10 songs simultaneously.

In other countries, "Cardigan" topped the singles chart in the Netherlands, reached number two in Malaysia and Singapore, and entered the top 20 in Denmark, Estonia, Lithuania, and Scotland.

== Music video ==
=== Synopsis ===
A scene in the music video, where Swift plays a moss-covered piano, from which a waterfall emerges. The video prominently incorporates cottagecore visuals.

An official music video for "Cardigan"—written, directed, and styled by Swift—was released alongside the album on July 24, 2020. The "homespun" and "dreamlike" video starts out with Swift sitting in a candlelit cottage in the woods, wearing a nightgown and playing a vintage upright piano. This scene also features a photograph of Swift's grandfather, Dean, who fought in the Battle of Guadalcanal, and a painting that she created during the first week of COVID-19 isolation. When the soundboard emanates golden sparkles, she climbs into it and finds herself magically transported to a moss-covered forest, where she plays the song on a grand piano producing a waterfall.

The piano bench begins to glow, Swift climbs into it again and is then carried to a dark, stormy, turbulent sea, where she holds on to a floating piano. The piano soundboard glows and she climbs in, and she returns to the cottage, where she dons a cardigan. According to a video posted to her Vevo account, the forest scene "represents the evergreen beginning of a relationship where everything seems magical and full of beauty", while the ocean scene "represents the isolation and fear involved while a relationship is breaking down." The video also states the ending scene "signifies returning to a sense of self after experiencing love loss", a journey of self-discovery; Swift's soaking-wet nightgown signifies how the relationship changes the individual. The music video is characterized by a prairie, cottagecore aesthetic.

=== Production ===
She had the whole storyline—the whole notion of going into the piano and coming out into the forest, the water, going back into the piano.

— Rodrigo Prieto on Swift, Rolling Stone

The music video was inspired by the period and fantasy films that Swift watched in isolation during the COVID-19 lockdown. She contacted cinematographer Rodrigo Prieto in early July to work on the video; Prieto had previously worked on the music video for "The Man". As the director, Swift worked with the assistant director Joe Osborne and the set designer Ethan Tobman. Swift developed the concept for the video, which Prieto described as "more ambiguous", "more personal", and "more of a fantasy" than "The Man". Ahead of filming, Swift drafted a shot list of the video, detailing the video's scenes with specific time sequences in the song, and sent visual references to Prieto and Tobman to communicate her vision of the video.

The ongoing COVID-19 pandemic presented many challenges to filming, and extensive safety standards were enacted. All crew members underwent COVID-19 testing, wore masks at all times, and practiced social distancing as much as possible. An onsite medical inspector supervised COVID-19 health and safety guidelines. As Swift had to remain unmasked for large amounts of time while filming, crew members wore color-coded wristbands to denote those allowed to come within close contact with her. Additionally, the entire video was filmed from a camera mounted to a robotic arm controlled by a remote operator, a technique usually reserved for crane shots and establishing shots.

Aside from directing and acting, Swift also did her own makeup, hair, and styling for the video. To keep the song from being leaked, Swift wore an earpiece and lip-synced to the song. The video was filmed indoors over a day and-a-half. Swift and the video's editor, Chancler Haynes, "worked simultaneously from two separate locations on set in order to edit the video on time".

=== Fashion and aesthetic ===
Accompanying the release of Folklore and "Cardigan", Swift sold "folklore cardigans", the replicas of the cardigan she wears in the song's music video—a cream-colored cable knit, with silver embroidered stars on the sleeves' chunky elbows, and navy blue piping and buttons—on her website. Swift also mailed the cardigans to celebrity friends and well-wishers. American fashion magazine W thought that the cardigan was the pièce de résistance of the album's cottagecore-centred merchandise. Teen Vogue said the cardigan aids in making "the perfect framework for understanding the role clothing plays in our lives", which gives a different perspective in understanding fashion, tracing back to fashion's "sentimental value". Refinery29 stated Swift returns to her "truest self", both musically and stylistically", bolstered by the merch cardigan and prairie dresses, and found the singer's looks in the music video similar to that of a classic "English rose". Irish Independent described the cardigan as a bulky, "Clancy Brothers-style" Aran sweater, and added that Swift "at this rate, [will] be playing a bodhrán and belting out 'The Auld Triangle' on Hill 16". Irish national broadcaster Raidió Teilifís Éireann thanked Swift for putting cardigans "back on the map once more", following James Thomas Brudenell, Coco Chanel, Kurt Cobain and Elizabeth II. The cottagecore aesthetic was met with resurgence on internet following the release of the video and the album.

== Awards and nominations ==
"Cardigan" has received five awards and 15 nominations. The song won Favorite Music Video at the American Music Awards of 2020, and contended for Song of the Year and Best Pop Solo Performance at the 63rd Annual Grammy Awards, marking Swift's fifth song to be nominated for Song of the Year and the fourth in Best Pop Solo Performance.

Awards and nominations for "Cardigan"
| Ceremony | Year | Award | Result | Ref. |
|---|---|---|---|---|
| MTV Video Music Awards | 2020 | Song of the Summer | Nominated | |
| UK Music Video Awards | 2020 | Best Visual Effects in a Video | Nominated | |
| American Music Awards | 2020 | Favorite Music Video | Won | |
| MVPA Awards | 2020 | Best Visual Effects in a Video | Nominated | |
| Nickelodeon Kid's Choice Awards | 2021 | Favorite Song | Nominated | |
| Grammy Awards | 2021 | Song of the Year | Nominated | |
| Grammy Awards | 2021 | Best Pop Solo Performance | Nominated | |
| ADG Excellence in Production Design Award | 2021 | Short Format: Web Series, Music Video or Commercial | Nominated | |
| iHeartRadio Music Awards | 2021 | Best Lyrics | Nominated | |
| RTHK International Pop Poll Awards | 2021 | Top 10 International Gold Song | Won | |
| RTHK International Pop Poll Awards | 2021 | Super Gold Song | Won | |
| AICP Awards | 2021 | Editorial: Music Videos | Nominated | |
| Myx Music Awards | 2021 | International Video of the Year | Nominated | |
| Nashville Songwriters Association International | 2021 | Ten Songs I Wish I'd Written | Won | |
| BMI awards | 2022 | Best Performed Song of the Year | Won | |

== Live performances and covers ==
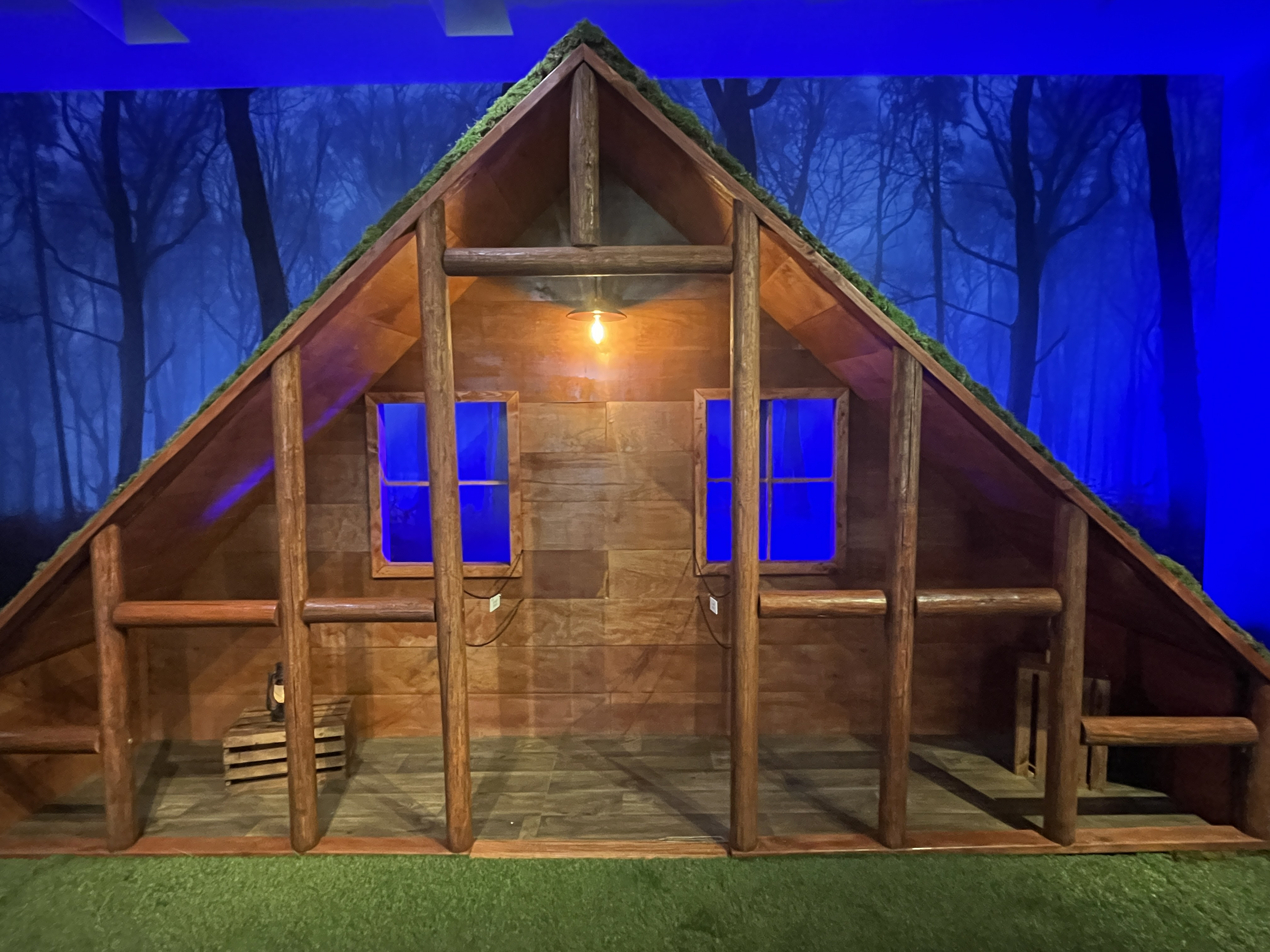
The house-like set piece above which Swift performed "Cardigan" at the 63rd Annual Grammy Awards. She sang the song seated on the right roof.

Swift performed "Cardigan" in her 2020 concert documentary film, Folklore: The Long Pond Studio Sessions, alongside all of the other tracks on Folklore. She performed a shortened version of "Cardigan" at the 63rd Annual Grammy Awards, as part of a medley with "August" and "Willow" (2020), in a cottagecore setting featuring a moss-covered cabin inside a forest, accompanied by the collaborators Dessner and Jack Antonoff. Pitchfork's Cat Zhang named the performance as one of the show's best moments. She praised Swift's vocals and the enchanted forest theme of the staging, and dubbed Swift's look for the performance as a "benevolent fairy princess in a kingdom of dwarves". The Washington Post listed Swift's performance as the sixth best of the show, highlighting its Folklore-inspired special effects, such as "woodsy, mystical aesthetic" and "haunted-looking trees and glittering gold lights". The Billboard critic Heran Mamo called it a "Lord of the Rings-meets-Twilight fantasy", and ranked it the fourth best performance of the evening. Rolling Stone's Rob Sheffield ranked Swift's performance as the foremost reason "we loved the 2021 Grammys", and listed it as one of the top-five greatest Grammy performances of all time. The song was included on the set list of the Eras Tour (2023–2024).

In October 2020, the English singer-songwriter Yungblud covered "Cardigan" as part of his segment for BBC Radio 1's annual Live Lounge month. He mashed-up the song with Avril Lavigne's "I'm with You" (2002), accompanying himself on an acoustic guitar, joined by a cellist and two violinists, resulting in a cheerful, strings-laden performance. Swift responded to the medley affirmatively. In July 2021, the Australian alternative rock band Something for Kate covered "Cardigan" as well, for a segment called Like a Version on Australian national radio station Triple J. The band stayed true to the song's original arrangement.

== Track listing ==
- Digital download and streaming
1. "Cardigan" – 4:00
- CD, 7" vinyl, 12" vinyl and picture disc
1. "Cardigan" – 4:00
2. "Songwriting Voice Memo" – 4:33
- CD, digital download, streaming, 7" vinyl and 12" vinyl (cabin in candlelight version)
1. "Cardigan" (cabin in candlelight version) – 3:48
2. "Cardigan" – 4:00

== Credits and personnel ==
=== Song ===
Credits adapted from the liner notes of "Cardigan".

- Taylor Swift – vocals, songwriting
- Aaron Dessner – production, songwriting, record engineering, drum programming, bass, electric guitars, Mellotron, piano, percussion, synthesizers
- Jonathan Low – record engineering, mixing
- Laura Sisk – vocal engineering
- Bella Blasko – engineering
- Randy Merrill – mastering
- Bryce Dessner – orchestration
- Benjamin Lanz – modular synthesizer
- Dave Nelson – trombone
- James McAlister – drum programming
- Yuki Numata Resnick – violin, viola
- Kyle Resnick – engineering
- Clarice Jensen – cello

=== Music video ===
Credits adapted from YouTube.

- Taylor Swift – direction
- Jil Hardin – production
- Rebecca Skinner – executive production
- Rodrigo Prieto – photography direction
- Chancler Haynes – editing
- Ethan Tobman – production design
- Joe Osborne – 1st associate direction
- Grant Miller – visual effects
- David Lebensfeld – visual effects
- Josh Davis – gaffing
- Ryan Mcquire – key grip
- Vincent Lucido – storyboards

== Charts ==
=== Weekly charts ===
Weekly chart performance
| Chart (2020) | Peak position |
|---|---|
| Australia (ARIA) | 1 |
| Austria (Ö3 Austria Top 40) | 46 |
| Belgium (Ultratip Bubbling Under Flanders) | 2 |
| Belgium (Ultratip Bubbling Under Wallonia) | 21 |
| Canada Hot 100 (Billboard) | 3 |
| Canada AC (Billboard) | 25 |
| Canada CHR/Top 40 (Billboard) | 22 |
| Canada Hot AC (Billboard) | 12 |
| Croatia Airplay (HRT) | 27 |
| Czech Republic Singles Digital (ČNS IFPI) | 29 |
| Denmark (Tracklisten) | 19 |
| Estonia (Eesti Tipp-40) | 15 |
| Euro Digital Song Sales (Billboard) | 15 |
| France (SNEP) | 138 |
| Germany (GfK) | 67 |
| Global 200 (Billboard) | 77 |
| Greece International (IFPI) | 26 |
| Hungary (Stream Top 40) | 29 |
| Iceland (Tónlistinn) | 26 |
| Ireland (IRMA) | 4 |
| Japan Hot 100 (Billboard) | 94 |
| Lithuania (AGATA) | 17 |
| Malaysia (RIM) | 2 |
| Mexico Ingles Airplay (Billboard) | 13 |
| Netherlands (Dutch Tipparade 40) | 1 |
| Netherlands (Single Top 100) | 57 |
| New Zealand (Recorded Music NZ) | 2 |
| Nigeria TV Airplay (TurnTable) | 100 |
| Norway (VG-lista) | 27 |
| Portugal (AFP) | 21 |
| Scottish Singles Sales (Official Charts) | 16 |
| Singapore (RIAS) | 2 |
| Slovakia Singles Digital (ČNS IFPI) | 45 |
| Spain (Promusicae) | 66 |
| Sweden (Sverigetopplistan) | 31 |
| Switzerland (Schweizer Hitparade) | 51 |
| UK Singles (Official Charts) | 6 |
| US Billboard Hot 100 | 1 |
| US Adult Contemporary (Billboard) | 12 |
| US Adult Pop Airplay (Billboard) | 8 |
| US Hot Rock & Alternative Songs (Billboard) | 1 |
| US Pop Airplay (Billboard) | 17 |
| US Rolling Stone Top 100 | 1 |

=== Year-end charts ===
2020 year-end chart performance
| Chart (2020) | Position |
|---|---|
| US Adult Contemporary (Billboard) | 31 |
| US Adult Pop Songs (Billboard) | 24 |
| US Hot Rock & Alternative Songs (Billboard) | 6 |

2021 year-end chart performance
| Chart (2021) | Position |
|---|---|
| US Hot Rock & Alternative Songs (Billboard) | 53 |

2023 year-end chart performance
| Chart (2023) | Position |
|---|---|
| Global 200 (Billboard) | 145 |

2024 year-end chart performance
| Chart (2024) | Position |
|---|---|
| Global 200 (Billboard) | 197 |

== Certifications ==
Certifications for "Cardigan"
| Region | Certification | Certified units/sales |
|---|---|---|
| Australia (ARIA) | 6× Platinum | 420,000^{‡} |
| Brazil (Pro-Música Brasil) | Diamond | 160,000^{‡} |
| Canada (Music Canada) | 2× Platinum | 160,000^{‡} |
| Denmark (IFPI Danmark) | Gold | 45,000^{‡} |
| France (SNEP) | Platinum | 200,000^{‡} |
| Germany (BVMI) | Gold | 300,000^{‡} |
| Italy (FIMI) | Gold | 50,000^{‡} |
| New Zealand (RMNZ) | 4× Platinum | 120,000^{‡} |
| Norway (IFPI Norway) | Gold | 30,000^{‡} |
| Poland (ZPAV) | Platinum | 50,000^{‡} |
| Portugal (AFP) | 5× Platinum | 50,000^{‡} |
| Spain (Promusicae) | Platinum | 60,000^{‡} |
| United Kingdom (BPI) | 2× Platinum | 1,200,000^{‡} |
| United States (RIAA) | Platinum | 1,000,000^{‡} |
Streaming
| Greece (IFPI Greece) | Gold | 1,000,000^{†} |
^{‡} Sales+streaming figures based on certification alone.^{†} Streaming-only figures based on certification alone.

== Release history ==
Release dates and formats for "Cardigan"
| Region | Date | Format(s) | Version | Label | Ref. |
|---|---|---|---|---|---|
| Various | July 27, 2020 | 7-inch single; 12-inch single; CD single; digital download; picture disc | Original | Republic | |
| Italy | July 27, 2020 | Radio airplay | Original | Universal | |
| United States | July 27, 2020 | Hot adult contemporary | Original | Republic | |
| United States | July 28, 2020 | Contemporary hit radio | Original | Republic | |
| Various | July 30, 2020 | 7-inch single; 12-inch single; CD single; digital download; streaming | Cabin in Candlelight | Republic | |

== See also ==
- List of Billboard Hot 100 number ones of 2020
- List of Billboard Hot 100 number-one singles of the 2020s
- List of Billboard Hot 100 top-ten singles in 2020
- List of Billboard Digital Song Sales number ones of 2020
- List of number-one singles of 2020 (Australia)
- List of top 10 singles in 2020 (Australia)
- List of top 10 singles in 2020 (Ireland)
- List of UK top-ten singles in 2020
