= Aponte =

Aponte is a surname from Galician and Portuguese: from a misdivision of Daponte, a topographic name from da ponte 'from the bridge'. It may refer to:

== People ==
- Ana Mercedes Aponte, Venezuelan politician
- Carlos Aponte (1939–2008), Colombian footballer
- Christopher Aponte, American ballet dancer
- Edwin David Aponte (born 1957), American historian and theologian
- Gabriel Cano de Aponte (1665–1733), Spanish soldier and Royal Governor of Chile
- Gianluigi Aponte (born 1940), Italian businessman
- Javier Aponte Dalmau, Puerto Rican politician
- José Aponte (disambiguation), several people
- Luis Aponte (born 1953), Venezuelan baseball player
- Luis Aponte Martínez (1922–2012), Puerto Rican Catholic cardinal
- Manuel Alejandro Aponte Gómez (1974–2014), Mexican drug cartel leader
- Mari Carmen Aponte (born 1946), American attorney and politician
- Mike Aponte, American blackjack player
- Ricardo Aponte (born c. 1949), United States Air Force general
- Rick Aponte (born 1956), Dominican Republic baseball coach
- Sergio Aponte Polito, Mexican Army general
- Sylvia Rodríguez Aponte, Puerto Rican politician
