= Folk-pop =

Music genre

- Stylistic origins: Folk; pop
- Cultural origins: 1960s

Folk-pop is a broad musical fusion genre that includes contemporary folk songs with pop arrangements, and pop songs with intimate, acoustic-based folk arrangements. Folk-pop has been popularized by mainstream media in recent years.

== Musical elements ==
Folk-pop incorporates the sounds of the acoustic guitar and banjo of traditional folk music and combines it with the more electronic and synth beats of today's pop genre. The folk genre is recognized for its simple melodies, story-telling nature, and cultural themes and messages, while pop music is recognized by a repetitive but catchy chorus and fast-paced tempos.

== History ==
Recording production values created an unblemished style that appealed to a mass audience, and thus led to commercial success as measured by high record sales, particularly as illustrated by hit records reaching the Top 40 on AM radio in the United States. Folk-pop developed during the 1960s folk music and folk rock boom. Key example of folk-pop artists include the Kingston Trio and Peter, Paul and Mary with contracts with major record labels (Capitol Records and Warner Bros. Records, respectively).

== Current ==
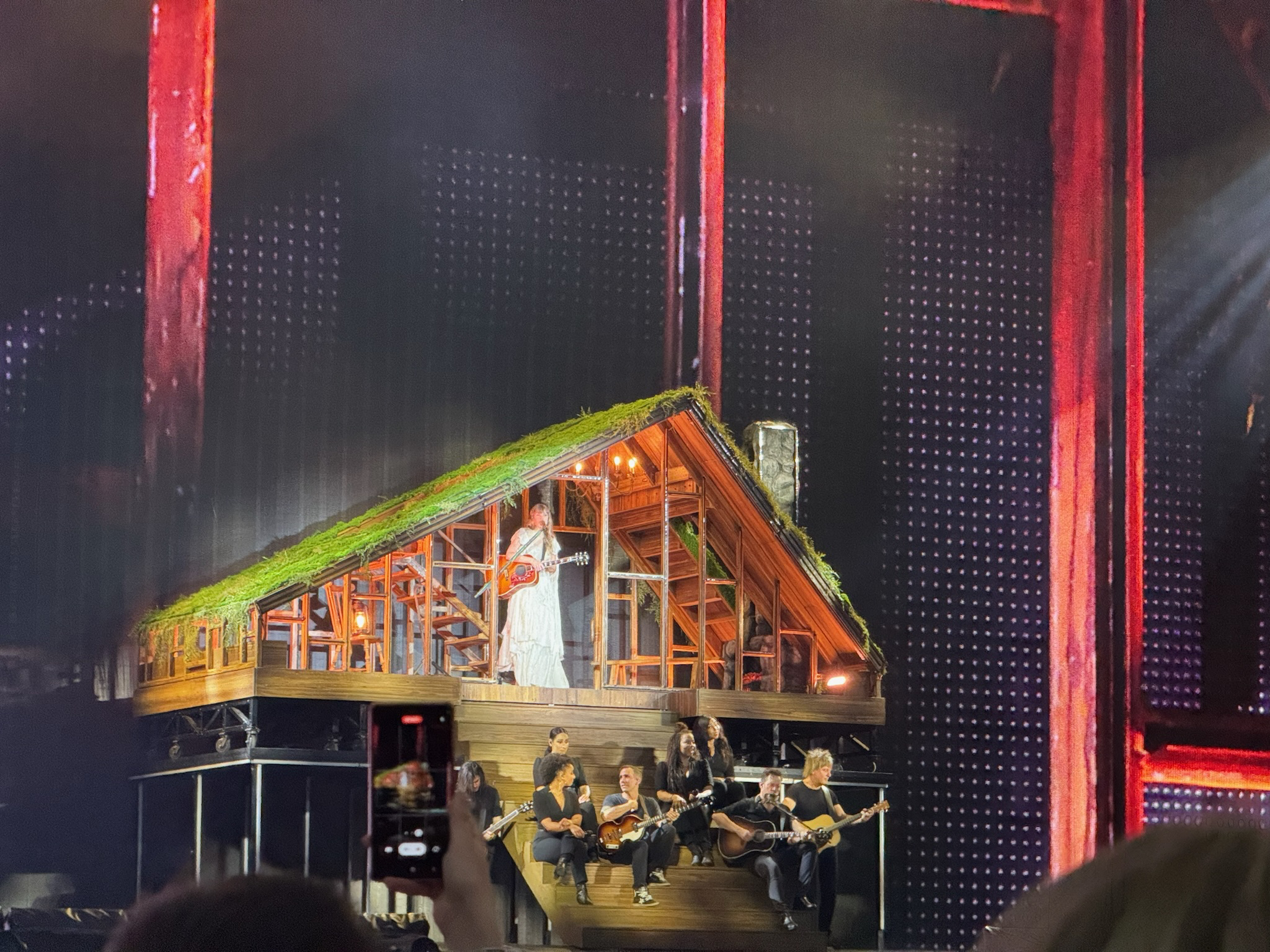
Taylor Swift performing the Folklore set during The Eras Tour in Germany (2024).

Folk-pop not only contains musical aspects of both the folk and pop music genres, but is recognized by its popularity in mainstream media. Social media platforms such as TikTok have allowed artists a large platform to reach a broad audience, which has led to the increasing popularity of songs and artists that use folk-pop elements in their music. Some rising artists exploring the folk-pop genre that have appeared on the Billboard Hot 100 in the last year include Tyler Childers, Noah Kahan, Zach Bryan, and The Lumineers.

Popular music today contains "inherently nostalgic properties" by referencing either past events or aspects of culture reflecting the timeframe in which the song is written. Taylor Swift's Folklore (2020) album has examples of folk-pop songs referencing aspects of both current and past culture. "The Last Great American Dynasty" tells the story of Rebekah Harkness, the woman that previously owned Swift's Rhode Island home in the 1940s to 1970s.

== See also ==
- Folk rock
- Folk music
