= Lawrence Rhodes =

American dancer (1939–2019)

- Born: November 24, 1939; Mount Hope, West Virginia, U.S.
- Died: March 27, 2019 (aged 79); New York City, U.S.
- Education: Ballet Russe School; Robert Joffrey Ballet School
- Known for: Principal Dancer-Joffrey Ballet; Principal Dancer and Artistic Director-Harkness Ballet; Artistic Director-Les Grands Ballet Canadiens de Montreal; Chairman-NYU Dance Department; Chairman-Juilliard Dance Division

Lawrence Rhodes (November 24, 1939 – March 27, 2019) was an American premier dancer, dance teacher and director of ballet companies and the dance divisions of New York University and the Juilliard School.

== Early life ==
Lawrence Rhodes was born in Mount Hope, West Virginia on November 24, 1939. Following his second birthday, his family moved to Detroit, Michigan. At age 9, his classmate, Glenda Ann Bush, introduced Rhodes to tap dancing. The pair became a dance duo, performing at functions around the city as "Buddy and Glenda Ann." (Rhodes went by the nickname of Buddy until he was renamed by Robert Joffrey in the 1960s.)

He discovered ballet at age 14 after seeing a Ballet Theatre performance of Swan Lake. Rhodes began his training with Violette Armand. By the summer of 1956, he was touring midwestern state fairs with the Chicago-based dance teacher Dorothy Hild. In 1957, Rhodes arrived in New York City, where he studied at the Ballet Russe School. Among his instructors there were Leon Danielian and Frederic Franklin.

== Dancer ==
From 1958 to 1960, Lawrence danced with the Ballet Russe de Monte Carlo in the corps de ballet. At the end of his second year with Ballet Russe, Rhodes started studying with Robert Joffrey. He was invited to join the Joffrey troupe in 1960. Lawrence Rhodes became a principal dancer with Joffrey Ballet, acclaimed for his performances in such works as Gerald Arpino's "Partita for Four" and "Ropes" and Brian MacDonald's "Time Out of Mind."

By 1962, arts patroness and heiress Rebekah Harkness had become the company's primary sponsor. Through the association with Harkness and her foundation, Joffrey Ballet gained national and international attention, performing at the White House and touring the Middle East and U.S.S.R. Since Harkness' foundation was paying for every facet of the company's existence, Rebekah insisted on greater involvement in artistic decisions. She ultimately demanded that the company be named after her, but would allow Robert Joffrey to stay on as artistic director.

Because all of the dancers' contracts were with the Harkness Foundation, Joffrey had little say in the matter. In February 1964, Harkness’ lawyers announced the name change and told the dancers they would be absorbed into the new company or could ask for release from their contracts. Only two dancers broke their contracts. Rhodes and ten other dancers: Lone Isaksen, Brunilda Ruiz, Helgi Tómasson, Margaret Mercier, Marlene Rizzo, Finis Jhung, Felix Smith, Suzanne Hammons, Karina Rieger and Elizabeth Carroll, moved on to the Harkness Ballet.

Rhodes' power as a dancer reached its peak with Harkness Ballet. He was lauded for performances in Stuart Hodes' "The Abyss", John Butler's "Sebastian" and "After Eden", and Rudy van Dantzig's "Monument for a Dead Boy." Rhodes was noted not only for his exceptional technique but also for his artistry as an actor. Reviewing "Sebastian," New York Times critic Don McDonagh wrote, "Mr. Rhodes' intensity is allowed full sway and he dominates the ballet. Emotion is the life blood of the work and no one on the ballet stage is capable of generating as much of it as Mr. Rhodes." New York Magazine's dance critic was equally impressed. "The company of brilliant dancers is led by the fabulous Lawrence Rhodes. He is one of the world's great dancers, and his double strength as an actor-dancer leaves him few rivals in the ballet world."

In 1968, Rhodes took over as Harkness Ballet's artistic director, voted in by his fellow company members. In this position, he balanced performing and administrative duties until Rebekah Harkness disbanded the troupe in 1970. Rhodes and his new wife dancer Lone Isaksen spent the following year with the Dutch National Ballet. For most of the 1970s, Rhodes worked primarily as a guest artist. He appeared with the Pennsylvania Ballet, Dennis Wayne's Dancers and the Feld Ballet, and toured with ballerinas Naomi Sorkin and Anne Marie de Angelo. From 1971 to 1973, he served as co-director of Milwaukee Ballet. Beginning in 1974, Rhodes toured Italy with Carla Fracci, performing the role of Albrecht to her Giselle and dancing the part of Mercutio in Romeo and Juliet. He gave his last performance (in the role of Mercutio) in 1978.

== Teacher, Director ==
During his time in Italy, Rhodes developed an interest in teaching and gave daily ballet classes to Fracci's dancers.

Returning to the U.S., he worked at New York University for ten years, first as a faculty member and then as chairman of the dance department. With the assistance of Deborah Jowitt, he helped to make the program more professional, reduced the time to attain an undergraduate degree from four years to three, and overhauled the Master of Fine Arts degree offerings. Rhodes also revived the Second Avenue Dance Company (SADC), a Tisch School of the Arts' program that had lapsed in 1989, and made it mandatory for all students in their final year. The Second Avenue Dance Company is a working dance troupe made up of graduate and undergraduate students. Each year, four notable guest choreographers create new work or set existing master works to provide students with a professional experience that allows them to explore new styles of dance. Students also develop their own choreography, which is showcased in concerts throughout their SADC year.

In 1989, Rhodes joined Les Grands Ballet Canadiens de Montreal as artistic director. He stayed with the company until 1999. During summers, he guest taught around the world, primarily at Nederlands Dans Theater, Ballet Frankfurt and Lyon Opera Ballet, where he returned annually until his death. He also served as a judge for the Beijing International Invitational Ballet Competition, the Seoul International Dance Competition, the Youth America Grand Prix and the Valentina Kozlova International Ballet Competition.

In 2002, Rhodes became the head of the Juilliard School's Dance Division, a position he held until 2017. He streamlined the dance curriculum and increased the students' performance opportunities by creating "New Dances." The New Dances initiative is an annual concert that features each class of students in a new work made especially for them by a prominent choreographer. During Rhodes' tenure, Juilliard dancers also participated in three major performance tours in the U.S. and Europe.

In July 2009, Lawrence received the Lifetime Career Achievement Award from Dance Teacher Magazine. Juilliard Dance Division was awarded the 64th Capezio Award in November 2015. The Capezio Award is given to individuals, companies or institutions that show respectful dignity through the exhibition of dance qualities such as creation, innovation and imagination. Juilliard's 2017 New Dances edition celebrated the legacy of Lawrence Rhodes, its creator and curator, and his impactful 15 years as head of the Dance Division.

== Personal life and death ==
In 1970, Rhodes married longtime colleague and dance partner, Danish ballerina Lone Isaksen. They had a son, Mark, born in October 1971. And had a granddaughter named Tamsin. In interviews, Rhodes spoke of his lifelong passion for travel. He and his wife also were involved in environmental causes. Isaksen died on November 2, 2010, after a long battle with cancer. Rhodes died on March 27, 2019, from a heart attack.
