= High Watch =

Colonial house in Rhode Island

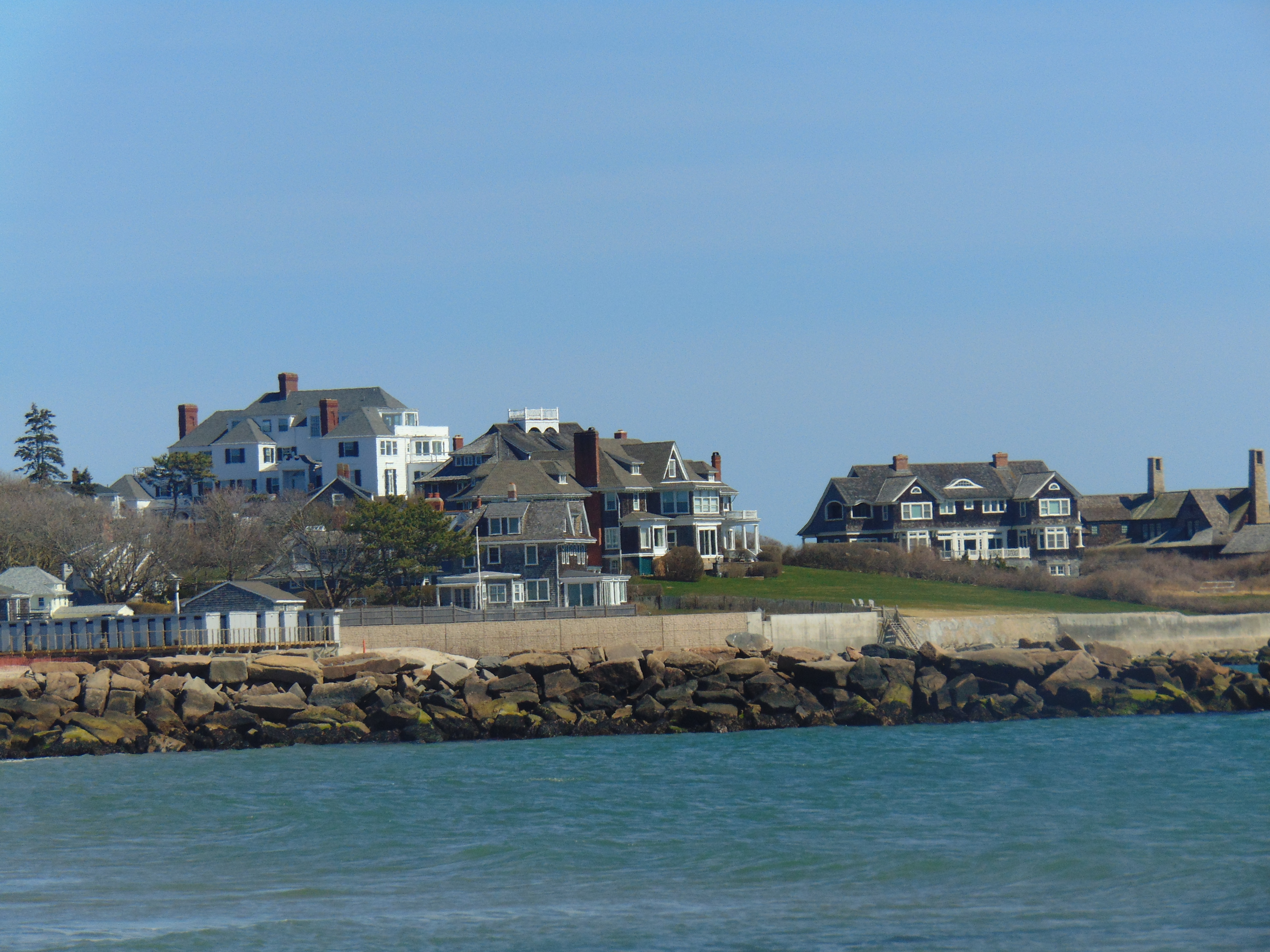
- High Watch (left) partially visible on Watch Hill

- Location within Rhode Island Location within the United States
- Former names: Holiday House, Harkness House

General information
- Type: House
- Architectural style: Colonial-style
- Location: 16 Bluff Avenue, Watch Hill, Rhode Island 02891
- Coordinates: 41°18′28.8″N 71°51′19.08″W
- Construction started: 1929
- Completed: 1930
- Owner: Taylor Swift

Technical details
- Floor area: 11,000 sq ft (1,000 m^{2})

The High Watch, formerly named the Holiday House, is an 11,000-square-foot (1,000 m^{2}) home in Watch Hill, a historic district in Westerly, Rhode Island, United States. It is the most expensive private home in the state. The American singer-songwriter Taylor Swift is the owner of the property since 2013. Locally, the mansion is also known as the Harkness House.

A Colonial-style mansion, High Watch sits on a 5-acre (2.0 ha) seafront estate that includes a private beach. The estate is situated atop Watch Hill's namesake hillock, which was used as a lookout point during the Seven Years' War and the American Revolution.

The house was built in 1929–1930 for the Snowden family, owners of an oil company, who named it Holiday House. It was then inherited by the Standard Oil heiress Rebekah Harkness—notorious amongst the local residents for her lavish lifestyle—in 1954. In 1974, businessman Gurdon B. Wattles purchased and renovated the house, renaming it as High Watch due to its location.

Swift purchased the house for US$17,750,000 in 2013. The house has since been a subject of publicity and media attention, mostly known for being the venue of Swift's annual Independence Day parties, attended by a range of celebrities. Inspired by the house's history and Harkness, Swift wrote and released the song "The Last Great American Dynasty" in 2020.

Several stalking, trespassing, and home invasion incidents have been reported at the house since Swift's purchase. In 2015, High Watch inspired a proposal by the then-Governor of Rhode Island, Gina Raimondo, to impose a luxury tax on expensive secondary homes in the state, nicknamed the "Taylor Swift Tax". (Note: The proposal was quickly withdrawn following criticism that claimed such a tax would be detrimental to the state's tourism industry. Nevertheless, the tax was reintroduced and enacted into law by the Rhode Island General Assembly in 2025.) In 2017, Swift was sued by her neighbors over her decision to build a seawall on the beach as plaintiffs argued the beach had been dedicated to the public over the years and Swift had no ownership of it; the courts ruled in Swift's favor, asserting the seawall prevents coastal erosion.

== Design ==
Holiday House was built in 1929-1930 by "an eminent Philadelphia architect", in a "hulking Colonial style pile". The house sits on over 700 feet (210 m) of shoreline, containing 8 bedrooms, 10.5 bathrooms and 8 fireplaces. The reception rooms include a 36-foot-long parlor, a 45-foot-long sun room, and an octagon-shaped formal dining room with built-in china cabinets. The kitchen reportedly contains a warming drawer and wine cooler, with an adjoining sitting room. There are four bedrooms on the second floor with en-suite bathrooms, and an expansive master suite with two bathrooms. The suite contains a sitting room with a wet bar as well as a widow's walk terrace. Lower levels include a recreation room, a service kitchen, a five-car garage, and a heated workshop. The estate also contains a swimming pool and a summer house.

== History ==
=== Prior to building ===
Watch Hill, on which the house would later be constructed, was the site of a signal station during the French and Indian War and used by Colonial forces as a lookout spot for British ships during the American Revolution.

=== Snowden family ===
Holiday House was built in 1929-1930 for Pearl Pinkerton McClelland Snowden of Philadelphia, the widow of George Grant Snowden, who had died in 1918. It stands as a landmark for sailors on the great bluff from which Watch Hill takes its name. Mrs. Snowden had acquired the historic and dramatic site from the estate of Eugene Atwood in 1929. Holiday House included a large servants quarters on what is now the northeast lawn. The servants quarters were demolished during extensive renovations carried out in the 1970s by Gurdon B. Wattles.

The Snowdens, beginning with George Grant Snowden's father, James McKean Snowden, who was born in 1831 and lived in Pittsburgh, had made their fortune in oil and gas exploration. George Grant Snowden and his brother, James Hastings Snowden, explored for oil first in Pennsylvania and then in Texas, Louisiana, New Mexico, and Oklahoma. The Snowden family is of Welsh descent, with ties to Welsh, English, and Scottish royals. Pearl was a descendant of pilgrim Edward Fuller, the House of Stuart, and Robert Burns.

The 1938 New England hurricane and associated storm surge caused significant damage to the hillside facing the ocean. In order to stabilize the badly eroded hillside, George Grant Snowden Jr. had thousands of granite boulders put in place, which remain there to this day.

Ownership of the property passed to George and Pearl's son Robert Burns Snowden, who died in an automobile accident when driving from the house in 1941, at age 23. It was Robert's heirs who sold the property in 1948 to William Hale Harkness, heir to the Standard Oil Company fortune.

=== Harkness family ===
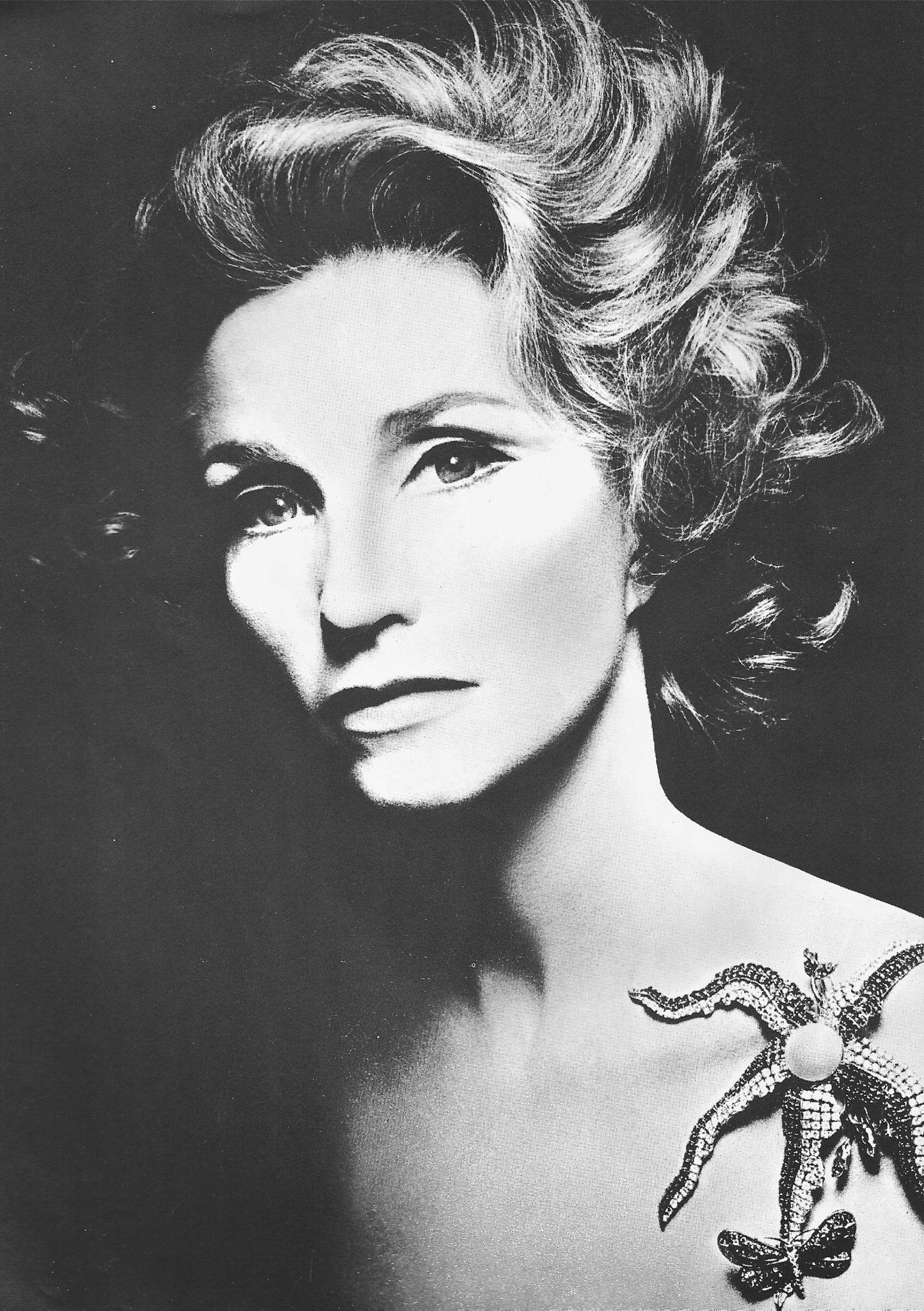
American socialite Rebekah Harkness purchased High Watch in 1948.

Stephen Vanderburgh Harkness was a progenitor of the extended Harkness family. He and his step-brother Henry Flagler invested heavily with John D. Rockefeller in Rockefeller, Andrews & Flagler, the corporate forerunner to Standard Oil. Harkness became the second-largest shareholder, which made him extremely wealthy. Harkness was a silent partner, though he served on Standard Oil's board of directors until his 1888 death.

Vanderburgh Harkness's half brother Daniel M. Harkness was a trustee of Standard Oil and a very rich man. He left his money to his son William Lamon Harkness. William fathered two children with Edith Hale: Louise Hale Harkness (1898–1978) and William Hale Harkness. In 1947, William Hale married Rebekah Semple West, who was previously married to Dickson Pierce. William Hale Harkness died in 1954, and Rebekah remarried twice:, first to Dr. Benjamin Harrison Kean, then to Niels H. Lauersen.

William Harkness, who had spent the prior summer with his family in Holiday House before his marriage to Rebekah, bought the house from Robert Snowden's heirs in 1948 for $80,000. Rebekah apparently was quite unpopular with her neighbors, doing unusual things such as cleaning her pool with champagne, and gambling with a wide range of guests, such as Spanish artist Salvador Dalí. Her erection of a temporary ballet stage on the grounds faced not only objections from neighbors but also from the state Supreme Court. She used her late husband's fortune to support charitable causes, such as the Joffrey Ballet. She withdrew funding when the Ballet refused to rename itself in her honor, and she created her own dance company called Harkness Ballet, hiring most of the Joffrey Ballet's dancers. The Harkness Ballet closed in 1975. Rebekah also funded medical research. Locals today still refer to the house as the Harkness House. In 1954, the house had an assessed value of $116,300.

=== Watch Hill Associates ===
The Watch Hill Associates purchased the property in 1972. They intended to have the home demolished in September 1974, so that the land could be used for a trio of smaller homes. A "final party" at the location was held August 11, 1974; over 500 people attended this fundraiser.

=== Gurdon B. Wattles ===
The Gurdon B. Wattles family bought Holiday House in 1974, renaming it High Watch. The Wattles family remained at High Watch until 1996.

=== Taylor Swift ===
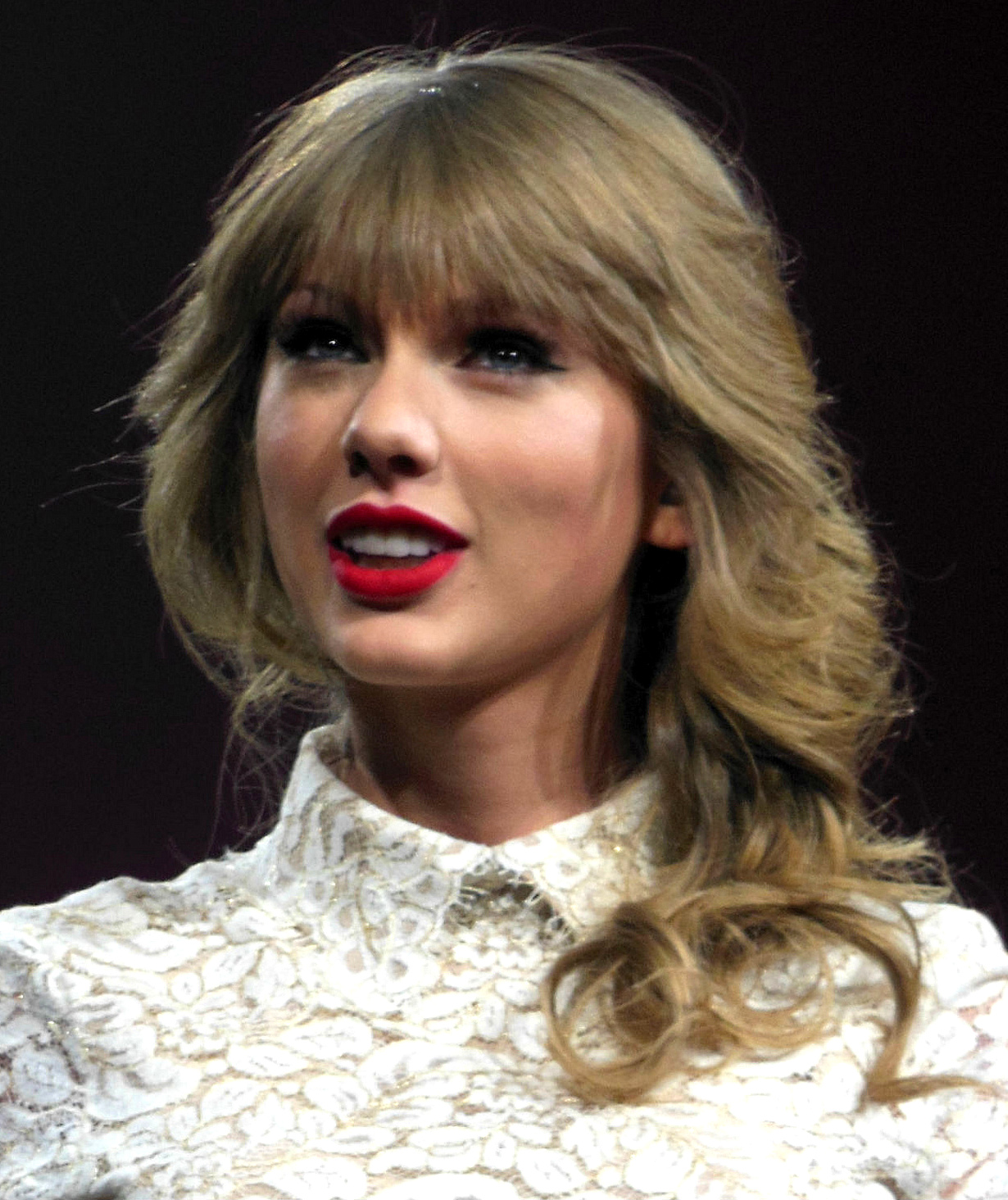
Taylor Swift (pictured in 2013), the mansion's current owner

In 2013 American singer-songwriter Taylor Swift purchased High Watch for US$17.75 million. From 2013 to 2016 she received widespread press coverage for hosting annual American Independence Day parties on the estate, featuring numerous celebrity guests and lavish decorations often depicted on Instagram. Cosmopolitan compared the parties to "legendary parties in the history of United States", such as the Met Gala and the Vanity Fair Oscars party, and called it one of the most exclusive invitations in the U.S. Vanity Fair opined, "few annual celebrity-hosted gatherings are surrounded by as much outsized mythos as Taylor Swift's Fourth of July party". The parties attracted controversy from local residents, who complained about the influx of paparazzi into Watch Hill and the unsolicited attention that Swift brings to the community. The parties were not held from 2017 to 2022. Although Swift did not disclose why, media outlets cited her stepping out of the spotlight and the presidency of Donald Trump as reasons. She resumed the tradition in 2023. A "star-studded" party Swift hosted at the house on August 24, 2024, drew extensive coverage.

In 2014 she faced criticism from local residents over a proposal to rebuild a seawall on her property which would reportedly impede public access to the beach. Swift responded that she sought to repair damage from coastal erosion, and the area of seawall was on her private beach, which had been used by the public for years before her purchase. Following a lawsuit in April 2017, the Rhode Island Supreme Court upheld a lower-court decision that landowners in Westerly can put up fences to keep strangers off their beach. The attorney general's office and environmental groups argued that the land had been dedicated to the public more than a century ago, but the court disagreed, ruling that the beach is privately owned.

Rhode Island Governor Gina Raimondo proposed a luxury tax on "pricey" second homes within the state worth over $1 million in 2015, which was referred to as the "Taylor Swift tax" in mainstream media. The tax was criticized and was eventually withdrawn. The tax was widely viewed as an obstacle for future tourism in the state, especially since people with second homes spent money without straining infrastructural resources such as school systems. Raimondo defended the proposal as potentially adding $12 million to the state's economy but then withdrew it.

Swift held the "Secret Sessions" at High Watch in 2014 and 2017, hosting listening parties for select Swifties prior to the release of her albums 1989 and Reputation. On April 2, 2019, a stolen car crashed into the estate's gates following a police chase that started in a neighboring town in Connecticut.

High Watch has "No trespassing" signs. Swift has had several stalking, trespassing, and home invasion incidents at the house since 2013. More than five separate cases have been reported by news outlets, with three in 2019 alone. A female trespasser was arrested in 2023.

Swift's 2020 studio album Folklore features "The Last Great American Dynasty", a song about the house and life of Rebekah Harkness. The lyrics detail parallels between Harkness's and Swift's unfavorable press reception at various points due to their personal lives and residence. The song was praised by critics for its lyricism and storytelling, and peaked at number 13 on the U.S. Billboard Hot 100 chart. In 2022 L'Officiel named High Watch as one of the most expensive celebrity homes in the Americas. The property was valued at US$20,434,100 as of 2024.

In 2025 Swift began a $1.7 million expansion project on the house, adding a bedroom suite and renovating the kitchen. On May 14, human remains were found near Swift's house and reported to the police, who launched an investigation; this fueled claims of a new serial killer in New England, which the Westerly police department denied. The Taylor Swift Tax, under the official title "Non-Owner Occupied Property Tax Act", was reintroduced and enacted in the Rhode Island General Assembly in July 2025 as part of the state's budget for 2026; Yahoo! Finance reported High Watch's 2025 value at approximately $30 million.

== See also ==
- Public image of Taylor Swift
- Samuel Goldwyn Estate, another house owned by Swift.
