= Finis Jhung =

American ballet dancer, dance company founder and dance teacher

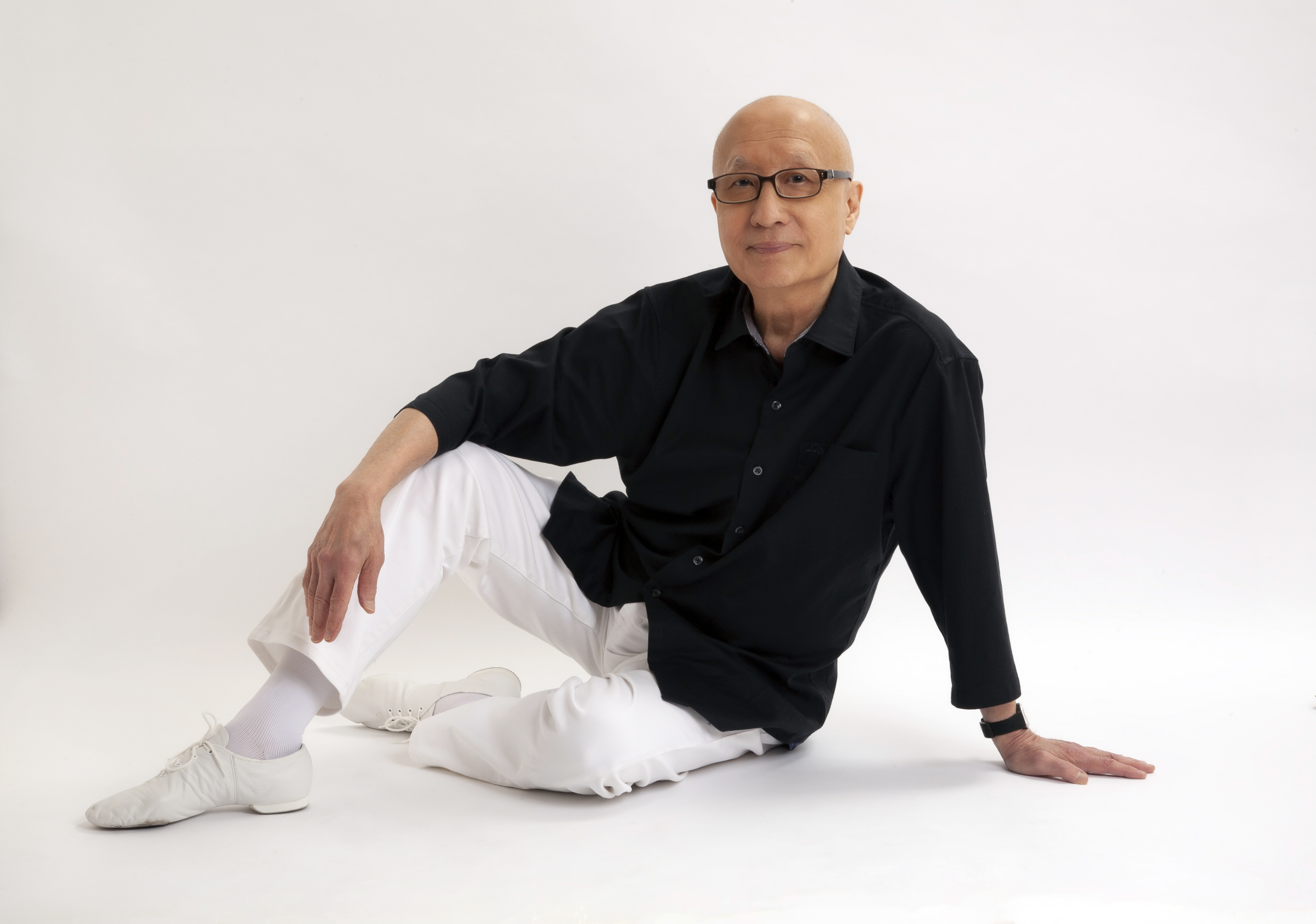
- Born: May 27, 1937 (age 88); Honolulu, Hawaii
- Occupations: Dancer; Dance teacher Dance company founder
- Known for: Principal dancer-Joffrey Ballet; Principal dancer-Harkness Ballet; Founder and Artistic Director-Chamber Ballet USA; Dance teacher-Finis Jhung Ballet Technique
- Website: https://finisjhung.com/

Finis Jhung (born May 27, 1937) is an American ballet dancer, dance company founder and dance teacher.

== Early life ==
Jhung was born on May 27, 1937, in Honolulu, Hawaii. His multiracial heritage includes Korean, Scottish and English ancestors. The youngest of three sons, born to Caroline and Walter Jhung, Finis' parents ran a tailor shop on Oahu's Hickam Air Force Base. The building was damaged, but not destroyed, during the Japanese attack on Pearl Harbor. At the end of World War II, as soldiers left the base, the Jhungs' business suffered. Finis' disconsolate father packed up and left Hawaii for the mainland. His mother filed for divorce which was granted in 1945 when Finis was nine years old.

As a child he studied tap, ballet, acrobatics and hula. As a teen, Jhung auditioned for Anton Dolin and Alicia Markova, then on tour in Hawaii. Dolin suggested that Jhung come see him when he "grew up."

Finis began studying ballet in earnest at the University of Utah, where he trained with Willam Christensen. While in college, he performed in musicals, The King and I, Carousel and Damn Yankees, as well as ballets, Coppelia and The Nutcracker. He graduated in 1959 with high honors. In 1960, he spent six months in the National Guard. While stationed at Ft. Leonard Wood, Jhung received a telegram from Rodgers and Hammerstein telling him they needed an Asian dancer who could perform double tours en l'air for Flower Drum Song on Broadway. Jhung successfully passed the audition, completed his military service and joined the troupe in New York.

== Dancer ==
Already in its second year, "Flower Drum Song" ran for a few more months on Broadway and then went on the road. When the show played San Francisco, Jhung reconnected with Michael Smuin and Kent Stowell, University of Utah classmates, who were dancing with the San Francisco Ballet (SFB). Finis auditioned and was hired for the company; he stayed with the troupe for a year and a half. At the same time, Flower Drum Song was being made into a movie and he was invited to join the cast.

By 1962, Jhung was ready to move on from SFB. He auditioned for and was accepted into the New York-based Joffrey Ballet, then known as the Robert Joffrey Theatre Ballet. He was immediately cast in Alvin Ailey's "Feast of Ashes" and Brian McDonald's "Time Out of Mind."

The Joffrey group was heavily dependent on funding from heiress and arts patron Rebekah Harkness. As her investment increased, she reportedly demanded a greater say in the company's operation. In 1964, this culminated in a split that led Harkness to establish her own ballet troupe. Eleven Joffrey dancers, including Jhung, joined the Harkness Ballet.

He stayed with the Harkness company from 1964 to 1969. In his memoir, Jhung says he initially served as the troupe's "exotic," while he longed to dance the principal roles in "white tights" (classical) ballets. In 1966, during a European tour, Jhung was introduced to Nichiren Shoshu Buddhism by the company's shiatsu masseuse. Shortly after beginning his new religious practice, he was profiled in Dance Magazine and chosen for a white tights role in Dolin's "Variations for Four." Jhung also found the courage to ask Rebekah Harkness for a promotion to Principal Dancer, which he was given.

Jhung danced lead roles in Norman Walker's "Night Song," Brian MacDonald's "Zealous Variations," John Butler's "Sebastian," and George Balanchine's "Minkus Pas de Trois." In his review of "Variations for Four", Saturday Review critic Walter Terry wrote, "Jhung combines the brio of the Western world with the clean clear linear delicacies and elegances of his part-Oriental heritage. He is the lad whose every movement is photographic-you don't see preparations, only results."

== Buddhist ==
In March 1969, following the New York season, Jhung decided to give up dancing to devote himself to Buddhism and world peace. To mark a break between his old and new lives, he burned his ballet memorabilia, books, photos, and films he had made of favorite dancers such as Erik Bruhn. Jhung found a nine to five job as office manager for an investment firm. He spent his evenings leading Buddhist group meetings, conducting lessons for new converts and providing one-on-one guidance. In January 1972, the office closed leaving Jhung unemployed.

According to the dancer, "My mission in life as a Buddhist is to help others. When I see people in trouble in ballet class, I want to help them solve their technical and artistic problems. I can't see any point in letting students continue working incorrectly, when they would look so much better if they followed my instructions. What else is there to do in life but help others? And, solving these problems in class leads me to create instructional videos, which can be used by people all over the world. I try to instill in my students what we call in Buddhism "a seeking spirit." To learn the truth so that you can apply it and better yourself."

== Teacher ==
In 1972, on the advice of his Buddhist leader, Jhung began teaching ballet. Since then, he has been a mainstay of the New York dance scene. He has taught members of New York City Ballet, American Ballet Theatre, the Robert Joffrey, Alvin Ailey, Paul Taylor, Martha Graham and Merce Cunningham companies, as well as Broadway performers, aspiring professionals and amateur adult beginners.

He operated his own studio from 1974 until 1987. During this period, Finis founded his own company, Chamber Ballet USA. He has also taught classes at The Broadway Dance Center, The Alvin Ailey American Dance Center, Peridance, Ballet Arts, The New Dance Group Arts Center, and Steps. Throughout the year, Jhung presents workshops for dance teachers and adult students. Jhung has rarely taught young children. When he first started dance instruction in his own studio, he only taught professionals. Over time, he transitioned away from professionals to teaching only amateur adult dancers, including beginners.

== Chamber Ballet USA ==
In June 1981, Jhung was approached by Stephen Belth, director of the Arts and Science Development Service, Inc. with the idea of forming an eight-member touring company, four men and four women, performing the works of world-class choreographers. The founding group of Chamber Ballet USA included Jhung as Artistic Director, Belth as Executive Director, and a four-member board that included Gwen Verdon. The first four ballets in the repertory were John Butler's "Othello," Vicente Nebrada's "Lento, a Tempo e Appassionato," Toer Van Shayk's "Jeux" and Lois Bewley's "Russian Blue." The company debuted on March 6, 1982, with a performance honoring Verdon. The public premiere took place December 14 through 19 in The Space at City Center.

Chamber Ballet offered numerous opportunities for fledgling choreographers. It allowed Jhung to make ballets, too.

In the spring of 1986, Antony Tudor (who would die the following year) re-staged his ballet "Sunflowers" for the company's final season. The reviews were universally positive. One critic hailed the performance as "glowing and spirited...The dancers are young and vigorous, and communicate to the audience their love of dance."

In June 1986, upon the resignation of Chamber Ballet USA's Board of Trustees President, the company finished its bookings and then folded.

== Ballet Dynamics, Inc. ==
When Chamber Ballet USA collapsed, Jhung returned to teaching full-time. Unable to resume classes at his former studio, he accepted guest teaching jobs at the Bartholin International Seminar in Copenhagen, before going to work at Richard Ellner's Broadway Dance Center. He would remain there until 1994.

Throughout his career, Jhung studied with some of the world's best-regarded ballet teachers: Vera Volkova, Erik Bruhn, Rosella Hightower, Valentina Pereyaslavec, Stanley Williams and Willam Christensen, but the two that had the biggest impact were Joanna Kneeland and David Howard. Kneeland's process applied anatomy and physics to dance instruction, while Howard's combined the Kneeland method with the basic classical training he had learned at The Royal Ballet. The New York Times described Howard's teaching style as "...a kinaesthetic approach, in which dancers were taught to rely less on external feedback from the mirror and more on the minute internal signals that telegraph the position of the head, limbs and torso in space."

In 1994, Jhung began to codify his own teaching techniques in a series of videos designed for dancers and dance teachers. A fellow dancer and dance teacher who regularly took his classes had said he should be more commercial. She thought that teachers who had not been professional ballet dancers, but ran successful studios, would benefit from videos that emphasized solid technique. She suggested Jhung break down the steps to make ballet easier to understand.

Since then, he has produced more than 50 instructional dance videos and 18 music CDs to accompany them, which he distributes through his business Ballet Dynamics Inc. In 2014, Jhung published The Finis Jhung Ballet Technique: A Guide for Teachers & Students. The book also "concentrates on the essentials for absolute and advanced beginners - of any age and body type - with an eye toward organic movement logic."

== Billy Camp ==
In 2008, the children's casting director for "Billy Elliot: The Musical" asked Jhung to teach the call-back classes for the original Broadway production. In addition to teaching at the call-backs, he taught regular classes for "Billys" of the original Broadway production and both national touring companies. At "Billy Camp," Jhung instructed boys who were under serious consideration for the role but were too young or required additional training. Working with these boys had special meaning for Jhung. In a Dance Magazine interview, he recalled, "when I was 11 years old growing up in pre-TV Hawaii, I used to dance around the house for hours to the same music from "Swan Lake" that is used for Billy's dream ballet."

== Personal life ==
In 1972, Jhung married Yuriko Honsho, first in a City Hall wedding, then in a traditional Buddhist ceremony. They divorced in 1985. They have one son Jason.

Finis has been the subject of numerous articles in national publications and was featured as a "ballet virtuoso" on Lifetime TV.

In 2018, Jhung wrote a lavishly illustrated autobiography, Ballet for Life: A Pictorial Memoir.
