= E16 =

E16, E-16, E.16 or E 16 may refer to:

== Computing ==
- The version 0.16 of the Enlightenment window manager

== Military ==
- Aichi E16A, an Imperial Japanese Navy seaplane which saw service during World War II
- HMS E16, a United Kingdom Royal Navy submarine which saw service during World War I

== Transportation ==
- European route E16
- County Route E16 (California), a county route in El Dorado County, California, United States
- The FAA location identifier for San Martin Airport in San Martin, California
- The DRG Class E 16, a German electric locomotive
- Yokohama–Yokosuka Road, an expressway numbered E16 in Japan

== Other ==
- E16, a postcode district in the E postcode area of London
- E16 is sometimes used to abbreviate Echovirus 16, the cause of Boston exanthem disease
- Alien of Extraordinary Ability (EB-1A, officially E11 / E16), a special green card for high achieving immigrants in United States.
