= Benjamin Harkarvy =

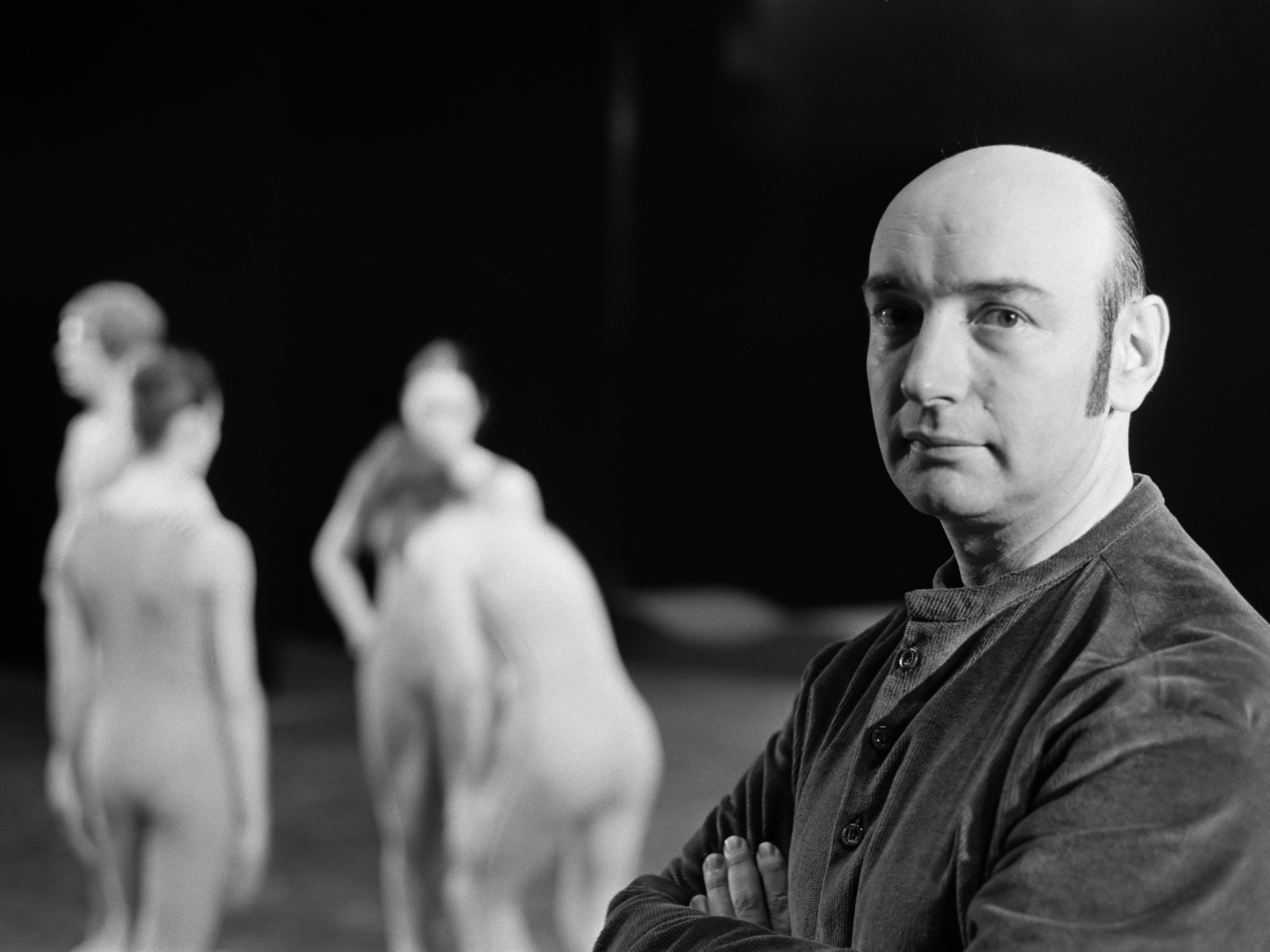
Benjamin Harkarvy (1971)

Benjamin Harkarvy (16 December 1930, in New York City – 30 March 2002, in New York City) was an American dance teacher, choreographer, and artistic director. He earned an international reputation for his eclectic approach to dance education (particularly seen in his directorship of the Juilliard School Dance Division), as well as through his leadership of a number of prominent dance companies.

== Biography ==
=== Early training ===
Harkarvy began to study dance at the age of thirteen, already focused on the goal of teaching. Among his principal teachers were two highly regarded Russian expatriates: Edward Caton and Elizabeth Anderson-Ivantzova. Harkarvy studied primarily at the School of American Ballet. He had only a brief performing career, making his debut with the Brooklyn Lyric Opera at the age of eighteen and appearing in summer stock productions.

=== Career ===
From 1951 to 1955, he taught at Michel Fokine's school in New York City, and, in 1955, he opened his own school. Harkarvy's first post with a dance company came in 1957 with the Royal Winnipeg Ballet. The following year he was named ballet master of the Dutch National Ballet. Unhappy over problems with that company, he and a number of the dancers broke away and formed Nederlands Dans Theater in 1959. Harkarvy and Hans van Manen co-directed this new company, which combined ballet and modern dance in its repertory, for a decade.

In 1969, Harkarvy became co-director, with Lawrence Rhodes, of the Harkness Ballet, which was disbanded the following year. He then returned to the Dutch National Ballet for a year, but, from 1972 to 1982, he was affiliated with the Pennsylvania Ballet. For Pennsylvania Ballet he taught daily and re-staged several of his well-known ballets-Madrigalesco, Recital for Cello and 8 Dancers, Grand Pas Espagnol plus created several new works including Quartet, Time Passed Summer, Continuum, Four Men Waiting, From Gentle Circles, Signatures and Poems of Love and the Seasons. He also brought in choreographers including Hans van Manen, Charles Czarny, Margo Sappington, Lynne Taylor-Corbett, Rodney Griffin, Choo San Goh, to create works for the company. During this period, Harkarvy helped to raise the profile of the Philadelphia-based troupe, but he left in 1982 after the company began to experience severe financial difficulties.

== Teaching ==
He subsequently held a variety of teaching positions before joining the Juilliard faculty in 1990. As director of the Juilliard's Dance Division from 1992, Harkarvy expanded existing programs and created innovative new ones, remaining with the school until the time of his death.
