= Brunilda Ruiz =

Puerto Rican ballet dancer (1936–2019)

- Born: June 1, 1936; Rincón, Puerto Rico
- Died: August 13, 2019 (aged 83); Waldwick, New Jersey
- Occupations: Ballet dancer Teacher; Choreographer
- Known for: Founding member of the Joffrey Ballet and Harkness Ballet

Brunilda Ruiz (June 1, 1936 – August 13, 2019) was a Puerto Rican ballet dancer, teacher, and choreographer. She toured internationally as a founding member of the Joffrey Ballet and Harkness Ballet companies.

== Biography ==
Ruiz was born in Rincón, Puerto Rico, and raised in Spanish Harlem in New York City. She had four sisters and two brothers. Ruiz started dancing at age 12. She attended the High School for the Performing Arts later known as Fiorello H. LaGuardia High School of Music and Art and Performing Arts, where Robert Joffrey taught her ballet.

In 1956, Joffrey asked Ruiz to be one of the six original Joffrey Ballet members. Ruiz was the youngest of the group, which also included Gerald Arpino, Glen Tetley, Beatrice Tompkins, Dianne Consoer, and John W. Wilson (to whom Ruiz was married from 1956 to 1967 and had a daughter Mhari Theresa Wilson). With the Joffrey Ballet, Ruiz toured the country, with her daughter in tow, performing one-night-only shows and introducing ballet as an art form to audiences across the United States. When Rebekah Harkness, patron of the Joffrey Ballet, disputed with Joffrey in the 1960s, the company split; Ruiz and Wilson joined the newly formed Harkness Ballet. She returned briefly to the Joffrey Ballet in 1968. As a performer, Ruiz toured internationally, dancing in Europe, the Soviet Union, Middle East, and India. She was the first woman of hispanic heritage to appear in the Women's Who's Who of America and was fondly known as the 'pride of Puerto Rico', returning to star as the Sugar Plum Fairy in The Nutcracker with the Ballets de San Juan

After retiring from performance in 1971, Ruiz taught and choreographed as associate director of the Baron Ballet in Waldwick, New Jersey, from 1976 to 1983. She served as ballet mistress with the Milwaukee Ballet from 1983 to 1986, and taught at LaGuardia, her alma mater, from 1986 until her retirement in 2001. She also taught at the Joffrey Ballet School-American Ballet Center in New York.

Ruiz married Joffrey principal dancer Paul Sutherland in 1968. She had two daughters, Mhari Theresa Wilson and Alicia Sutherland. In 1995, Ruiz earned a Bachelor of Arts degree from the State University of New York Empire State College.

Ruiz died peacefully in her home surrounded by loved ones in Waldwick, New Jersey, on August 13, 2019, at the age of 83.
