= David Howard (ballet teacher) =

English ballet dancer and teacher

David Howard (born David Charles Edwards) (14 June 1937 – 11 August 2013) was an English ballet dancer and teacher, who taught internationally at institutions such as the Royal Ballet, the American Ballet Theatre, San Francisco Ballet, Joffrey Ballet, and the National Ballet of Canada. Howard opened his popular eponymous dance studio in New York City, the David Howard School of Ballet (later the David Howard Dance Center) in 1977, before its closure in 1995. His dance center welcomed all students including children, adult beginners and professionals from the Broadway musicals and ballet. In addition to his teaching, Howard was an expert on the history of the pointe shoe worn by ballet dancers, and a pioneer in their design.

As a boy, Howard studied dance and won the Royal Academy of Dance's Adeline Genée Silver Medal aged 16. When he registered with the British performing artists' union, Equity, he found that a David Edwards was already a member, and so he had to call himself David Howard. Howard later became a dancer in the London Palladium chorus, appearing in shows featuring Julie Andrews, Marlene Dietrich and Danny Kaye. Howard was a soloist at the Sadler's Wells Theater Ballet, the forerunner of the Birmingham Royal Ballet. From the Royal Ballet he briefly joined the National Ballet of Canada, and returned to london in the early 1960s. Howard performed in musicals in London before a back injury ended his performing career, and began to train as a hairdresser, which further hurt his back.

Howard continued to teach dance and in 1966 Howard was contacted by the oil heiress Rebekah Harkness, who was looking for teachers for her ballet school, the Harkness Ballet in New York City. Howard left to teach in her school in Manhattan, where he lived for the rest of his life. Of his move to the United States Howard said that he "...came as an upstart and ended up a part of the American dream." Howard later taught at two dance schools in Manhattan, Steps on Broadway and the Broadway Dance Center. He also taught internationally and created 125 instructional dance CDs and DVDs.

His teaching style was described by The New York Times as "...a kinaesthetic approach, in which dancers were taught to rely less on external feedback from the mirror and more on the minute internal signals that telegraph the position of the head, limbs and torso in space". Howard said of dance that "Out of the feeling comes the form...Ninety percent of the time students are taught the form first. And then they're expected, through some act of God, to get the feeling." Howard's pupils included Gelsey Kirkland, Patricia McBride and Mikhail Baryshnikov. McBride paid tribute to Howard describing him as "...one of the great teachers of our day, for many, many years," and Baryshnikov said of Howard that "He was a kind of father figure for people like me and like Gelsey."
