= Eruptive pseudoangiomatosis =

- Specialty: Dermatology

Eruptive pseudoangiomatosis is a cutaneous condition characterized by the sudden appearance of 2- to 4-mm blanchable red papules. It can appear in children or adults. The papules appear similar to hemangiomas Viruses found in patients include Echovirus 25 and 32, coxsackie B, Epstein–Barr virus, and cytomegalovirus.

== See also ==
- Boston exanthem disease
- Skin lesion
