= The Last Great American Dynasty =

2020 song by Taylor Swift

Song by Taylor Swift

from the album Folklore
- Released: July 24, 2020
- Studio: Kitty Committee (Los Angeles); Long Pond (Hudson Valley)
- Genre: Folktronica; country; guitar pop
- Length: 3:51
- Label: Republic
- Songwriters: Taylor Swift; Aaron Dessner
- Producer: Aaron Dessner

Lyric video
- "The Last Great American Dynasty" on YouTube

"The Last Great American Dynasty" is a song by the American singer-songwriter Taylor Swift from her eighth studio album, Folklore (2020). The life of the American socialite Rebekah Harkness, who once lived in Swift's Rhode Island mansion, inspired her to write the song.

The lyrics recall Harkness's inherited wealth from her husband and her decadent lifestyle, which became the gossip of the town; the final refrain draws parallels between Harkness's life and Swift's, implying how others scrutinized them both for their personal lifestyles. Aaron Dessner co-wrote and, inspired by the sound of Radiohead's In Rainbows (2007), produced the song. "The Last Great American Dynasty" is an indie-oriented folktronica, country, and guitar pop tune featuring an uptempo arrangement of percussions, layered electric guitars, slide guitar, strings, and electronic elements.

Music critics praised Swift's songwriting from a third-person perspective and the production. The publications American Songwriter, Billboard, Pitchfork, and Uproxx ranked it among the best songs of 2020. "The Last Great American Dynasty" entered the top 10 of charts in Australia, Malaysia, and Singapore, and the top 20 in Canada, New Zealand, and the United States. It was certified gold by the British Phonographic Industry (BPI). Swift performed the song in the concert documentary Folklore: The Long Pond Studio Sessions (2020), as well as on the Eras Tour, from March 2023 to March 2024.

== Background and composition ==
Aiming for an uptempo and enticing sound, the American musician Aaron Dessner composed the instrumentals of "The Last Great American Dynasty" inspired by the electric guitars in Radiohead's album, In Rainbows (2007). He sent the music sample to American singer-songwriter Taylor Swift, who was isolating herself due to the COVID-19 pandemic; she liked the sound, and wrote the lyrics to the song in under the time Dessner would go out for a run and return. The lyrics were inspired by the life of the American socialite Rebekah Harkness, whom Swift wanted to write about ever since she purchased Holiday House in 2013.

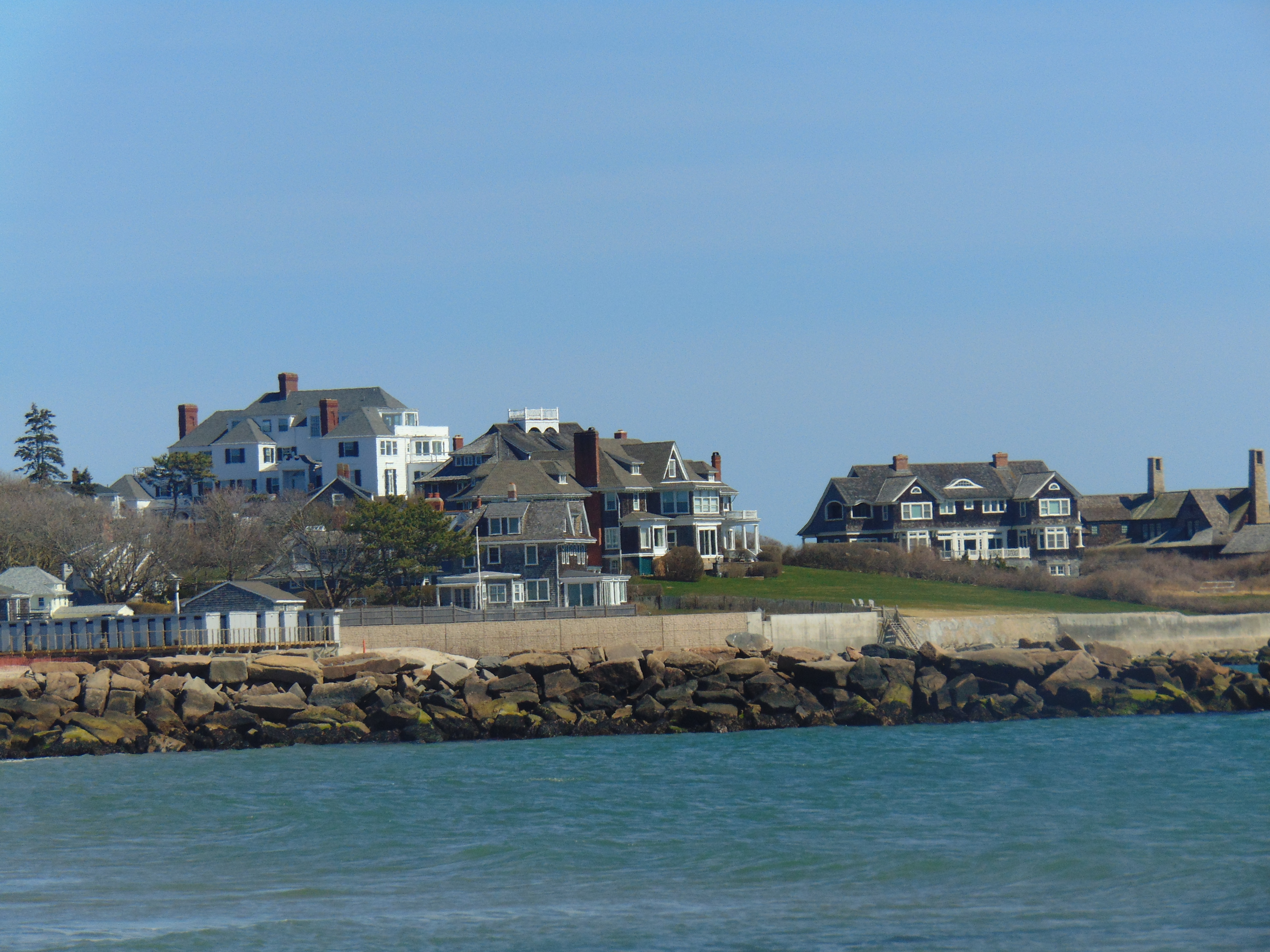
Swift's Holiday House (left) in Westerly, Rhode Island, the setting of "The Last Great American Dynasty"

In a 2020 Entertainment Weekly interview, Swift revealed that she first learned about Harkness from a real estate agent who walked her through the property. Consequently, the singer started reading a lot about Harkness's life and found her stories interesting. It led to the development of parallels between Harkness and herself, both of them "being the lady that lives in that house on the hill that everybody gets to gossip about". Swift stated she was looking for a chance to write about Harkness, and finally found it when she heard the instrumental track that Dessner sent. Swift employed a narrative device in the song's lyrics commonly found in country music, which she described as: "the first verse you sing about someone else, the second verse you sing about someone else who's even closer to you, and then in the third verse, you go, 'Surprise! It was me'. You bring it personal for the last verse".

"The Last Great American Dynasty" is a folktronica, country, and guitar pop tune that embraces an alternative, indie-leaning production, making use of classical instruments like slide guitar, viola, violins and drums. Swift's vocal range in the song spans between E_{3} to B_{4}. The song is written in the key of G major and has a moderately fast tempo of 148 beats per minute. In a 2021 exclusive for People, Swift further explained why Harkness inspired the song: "It can be a real pearl-clutching moment for society when a woman owns her desires and wildness, and I love the idea that the woman in question would be too joyful in her freedom to even care that she's ruffling feathers, raising eyebrows or becoming the talk of the town. The idea that she decided there were marvelous times to be had, and that was more important".

== Lyrics ==
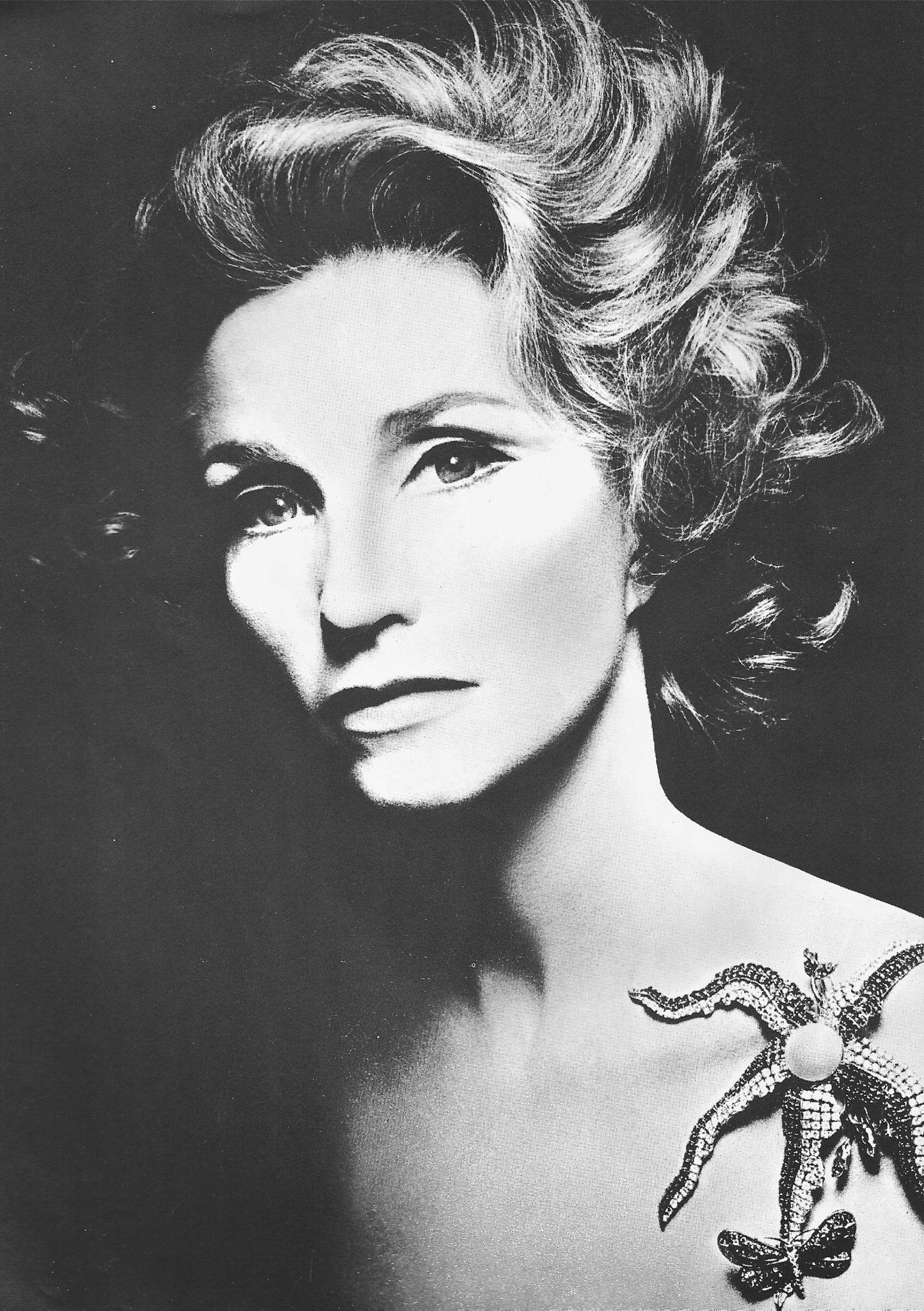
The song chronicles the life of Rebekah Harkness (pictured), who owned Standard Oil, founded Harkness Ballet, and resided in the Holiday House.

Her name was Rebekah Harkness. And she lived in the house that I ended up buying in Rhode Island. That's how I learned about her. But she was a woman who was very, very talked about, and everything she did was scandalous. I found a connection in that.

— Swift on the inspiration behind "The Last Great American Dynasty", Rolling Stone

"The Last Great American Dynasty" narrates the story and satirizes the vilification of Rebekah Harkness, an American socialite who had inhabited Swift's mansion Holiday House in Watch Hill, Rhode Island. It is structured similar to a lyrical ballad: it follows an abab rhyme scheme and a four-beat line. Written in a townsfolk third-person narrative, it details the following: Rebekah West, a middle-class divorcée from St. Louis, married William "Bill" Harkness in 1947, who was the heir to Standard Oil, an oil-refining company that was the 19th-century's first and largest multinational corporation in the world. The couple bought a seaside estate in Watch Hill, Rhode Island, and nicknamed it "Holiday House". Bill died of heart attack in 1954, for which Rebekah was blamed by the town. After her then-husband's death, Rebekah inherited his enormous wealth and became one of the wealthiest women in the US.

Rebekah invited "big names" and her "bitch pack"—a group of female city friends—to the house, and spent the new money by throwing numerous high-class events and "outrageous" parties; Watch Hill scorned her for causing the downfall of the Harkness family, calling her the maddest and the "most shameless" woman in the town's history. Pursuing her passion for arts, Rebekah founded a professional ballet company in 1964, called the Harkness Ballet. Further details in the song about Harkness' life include: how she gambled with Spanish surrealist artist Salvador Dalí, "filled" her swimming pool with champagne, when in fact, she had only used champagne to clean the pool, and stole a neighbor's dog and dyed it lime green because of a feud, whereas in reality, it was a cat instead of a dog, which implies the inaccuracy of gossips—one of many lyrical motifs present in Folklore. The lyric "she had a marvelous time ruining everything" refers to the hate she received from the town and tabloids, and how Rebekah is infamous for "not fitting in".

In the song's bridge, Swift reveals her purchase of the Holiday House after 50 years of its vacancy, and in the final chorus, she shifts to first-person narrative, proclaiming herself "the loudest woman" the town has ever seen, and correlates between her celebrity life and Rebekah's controversies. Swift resonates her highly criticized moves with elements of Rebekah's story, and concludes the song with an outro of "I had a marvelous time ruining everything". Mainstream media has linked several moments of Swift's unfavorable press to that of Rebekah's, including the scrutiny the singer faces because of her highly publicized romantic life, her "squad" of popular celebrities, the Fourth of July parties she threw at the Holiday House, Watch Hill residents' concerns about the attention Swift brings to the community, and the governor of Rhode Island, Gina Raimondo, suggesting a tax on secondary homes costlier than $1 million, which was famously dubbed "the Taylor Swift tax". "The Last Great American Dynasty" is thematically feminist, and thus considered to be a prequel to the twelfth Folklore track, "Mad Woman".

== Critical reception ==
Critics praised "The Last Great American Dynasty" for Swift's signature wordplay and the storytelling plot. Hannah Mylrea of NME lauded the song for its brooding instrumentals, Swift's peculiar vocals, and storytelling style reminiscent of works by Mary Chapin Carpenter and Bob Dylan, and pitted it as "a contender for the best Taylor Swift song ever written". Noting its historical details, Americana imagery and "Fitzgerald-esque" lines, Pitchfork writer Julian Mapes hailed the song as "the all-timer, the instant classic" that celebrates society-defying women, and stated that the lyrics "play out in your mind like a storybook", but successfully point out society's reception of assertive women. Mapes also hailed the production as "textural and tastefully majestic". Finding the song's lyricism as the most impressive storytelling from all of Folklore, Mikael Wood of the Los Angeles Times named the song the most humorous of all tracks, ranking it the album's third best song. Wood described it "a detailed portrait of the real-life woman who owned Swift's Rhode Island mansion—and evidently scandalized the town's gentry—decades before the singer did".

PopMatters critic Michael Sumsion labelled the song a shrewd comparison that upgrades a small-town tale into a "towering myth". Callie Ahlgrim of Insider asserted the twist in the song's bridge as "poetic genius". She further compared the final chorus tuning back to the present, underlining the parallels between Rebekah and Swift, to the bridge of Swift's 2008 hit, "Love Story", where Romeo proposes. Chris Willman of Variety opined that Swift has "a grand old time" identifying herself with women who lived decades before her. In congruence, Rob Sheffield of Rolling Stone wrote that the song satirizes the upper-class environment of "Starlight", the fifteenth track on Swift's 2012 album Red, and matched the similarities between the songs—the usage of the word "marvelous" and the muses being people who lived decades before Swift's birth.

A highlight from her summer quarantine album Folklore that traces the glamorous, troubled life of 20th-century heiress Rebekah Harkness [...] With the intrigue of a story song and the intimacy of a biography, Swift delves into socialite anthropology and returns with an epitaph for a woman she'll never meet. The real magic is the winking humility of the image in the mirror: a woman criticized endlessly for being too rich and too gauche who knows that living well is still the best revenge.

— Anna Gaca, music critic, "The 100 Best Songs of 2020", Pitchfork

Uproxx writer Philip Cosores regarded "The Last Great American Dynasty" as entrenched in Swift's trademark "melodic warmth" and "vivid details", and complimented Dessner's slow-burning production. Olivia Ovenden of Esquire picked the song as the album's highlight, and commended it for "seamlessly" blending indie sounds with Swift's pop prowess. Jon Caramanica of The New York Times commented that the subject of the song, Harkness, is "a classic Swift heroine", who is purposeful, disruptive and misunderstood. Jonathan Keefe, writing for Slant, thought the song highlights how Swift's "widening worldview" has enhanced her songwriting skills. Caleb Campbell, writing for Under The Radar, found Swift seeing herself in the misogynistic tabloid gossip that afflicted Harkness, but shunning out the "diaristic, reputation-obsessed" semblance of her older catalogue.

Katie Moulton, writing for Consequence of Sound, summarized that the song is a result of Swift's imagination expanding, as she is "consciously trying to write from perspectives not her own". Nick Levine of The Telegraph pondered whether Swift is only acknowledging tensions with Watch Hill locals in the song, or if she is designating herself the successor to Harkness, and picked "The Last Great American Dynasty" as an album standout for exemplifying why Swift is one of the great songwriters of her generation. Billboard listed "The Last Great American Dynasty" as one of its 20 picks for 2020 Song of the Summer, and remarked that the song gives-off "a more summery vibe" despite the generally "chillier" atmosphere of Folklore.

=== Accolades ===
In her list ranking all 161 songs by Swift yet, Hannah Mylrea of NME placed the song at number two, only behind "All Too Well" (2012). She was impressed at how "The Last Great American Dynasty" manages to communicate a huge portion of Harkness's life in under few minutes, topping it off with a "banging" chorus. NME placed the song at number eight on its list of 50 best songs of 2020, stating "Swift engaged masterful storytelling techniques over Dessner's glitchy, cantering production, vividly spinning the tale of Harkness' life while drawing parallels between the sexist criticism both women have received [...] It's an astonishing song: one that fuses witty lyricism with megawatt hooks, and a reminder that Taylor Swift is an artist who should never be underestimated." Uproxx listed the track as the 15th best song of 2020, with Caitlin White dubbing it a "quintessential Swiftian creation". Pitchfork named it the 32nd best song of 2020 on its list ranking the year's 100 best songs. Billboard ranked it as the 39th best song of 2020, while American Songwriter listed it amongst its 20 best songs of the year. In 2021, Rob Sheffield placed "The Last Great American Dynasty" at number 17 on his ranking of Swift's 199 songs, while Clash critics named it one of the 15 best songs in her discography.

== Commercial performance ==
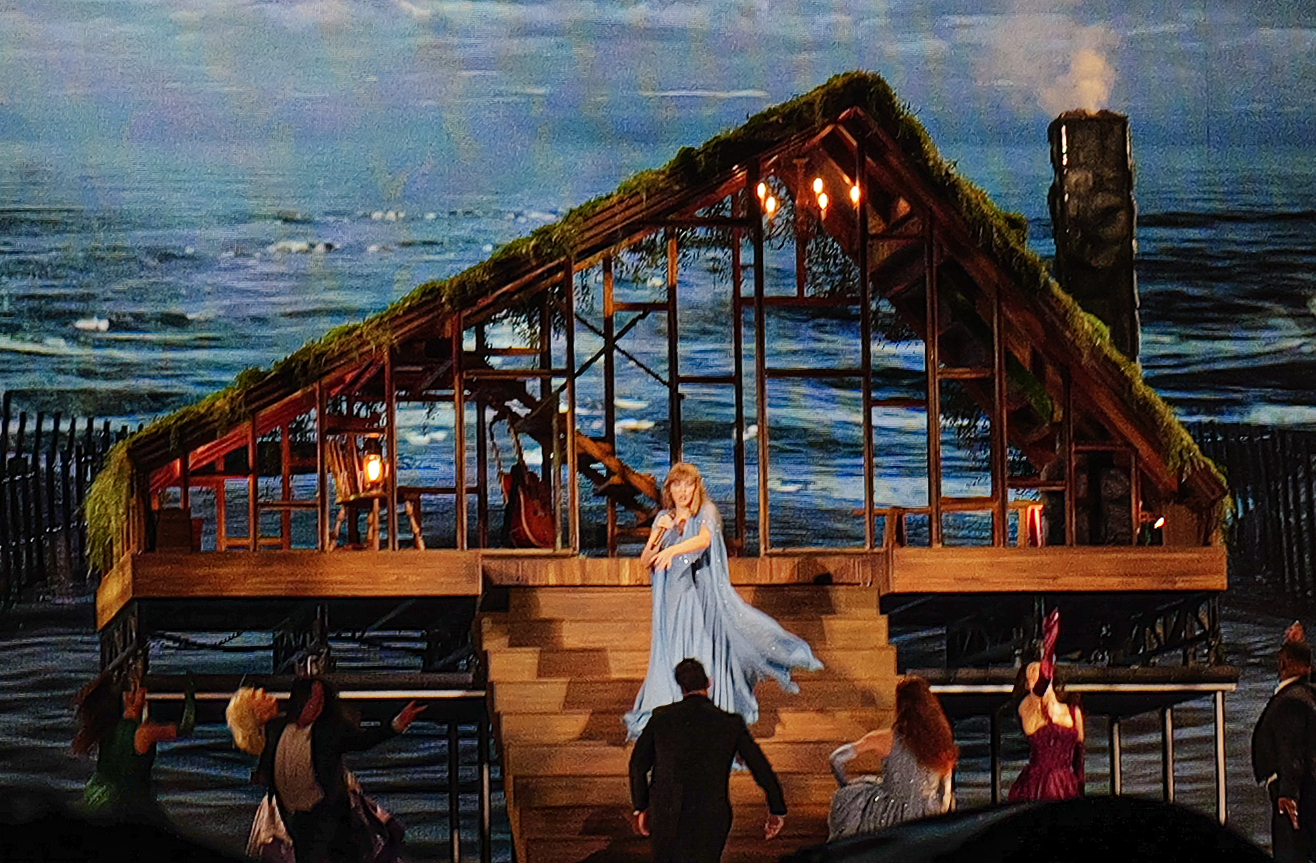
Swift performing "The Last Great American Dynasty" on The Eras Tour

Upon release of Folklore, "The Last Great American Dynasty" reached the top-20 in many countries worldwide. In the US, all of the album's 16 tracks debuted on the Billboard Hot 100 simultaneously, with the song at number 13—the fourth highest-peaking song from the album, behind "Cardigan" (number one), "The 1" (number four) and "Exile" (number six), and one of its five top-20 entries. It further debuted at number 42 on the Billboard Digital Song Sales chart. The song peaked at number 13 on both of the Canadian Hot 100 and New Zealand Top 40 Singles charts.

In Australia, "The Last Great American Dynasty" debuted at number seven on the ARIA Singles Chart; along with four other tracks from Folklore that landed in the top-10, giving the album five top-10 entries in the country. The album spawned five top-10 debuts in Malaysia as well, where the song peaked at number 10 on the RIM Singles chart. On the Singapore Top 30 Digital Streaming chart, it peaked at number nine, marking the fourth top-10 entry from Folklore in the country. The song further arrived at numbers 56, 81 and 89 on Ö3 Austria Top 40, Portugal's AFP Top 200 Singles and Sweden's Sverigetopplistan, respectively.

== Credits and personnel ==
Credits are adapted from the liner notes of Folklore.

- Taylor Swift – vocals, songwriting
- Aaron Dessner – production, songwriting, recording, drum programming, keyboards, percussion, piano, synthesizer, bass guitar, electric guitar, slide guitar
- Bryce Dessner – orchestration
- Rob Moose – orchestration, violin, viola
- J.T. Bates – drums
- Jonathan Low – mixing, recording
- Laura Sisk – vocal engineering
- Randy Merrill – mastering

== Charts ==
Chart performance for "The Last Great American Dynasty"
Chart (2020–2021)	Peak position
Australia (ARIA)	7
Austria (Ö3 Austria Top 40)	56
Belgium (Ultratip Bubbling Under Wallonia)	40
Canada Hot 100 (Billboard)	13
Malaysia (RIM)	10
New Zealand (Recorded Music NZ)	13
Portugal (AFP)	81
Singapore (RIAS)	9
Sweden (Sverigetopplistan)	87
UK Audio Streaming (Official Charts)	18
US Billboard Hot 100	13
US Rolling Stone Top 100	6

== Certifications ==
Certifications for "The Last Great American Dynasty"
Region	Certification	Certified units/sales
Australia (ARIA)	2× Platinum	140,000^{‡}
Brazil (Pro-Música Brasil)	Platinum	40,000^{‡}
New Zealand (RMNZ)	Platinum	30,000^{‡}
United Kingdom (BPI)	Gold	400,000^{‡}
^{‡} Sales+streaming figures based on certification alone.

== See also ==
- List of top 10 singles in 2020 (Australia)
- Samuel Goldwyn Estate
