= Franklin A. Neva =

American physician

Franklin Allen Neva (June 8, 1922 in Cloquet, Minnesota – October 16, 2011 in Billings, Montana) was a virologist and physician who discovered Boston exanthem disease, helped isolate rubella virus, and worked with Jonas Salk on the development of the polio vaccine. He was the first member of the American Society of Tropical Medicine and Hygiene to receive the Ben Kean Medal, in 1995, and also won the Donald Mackay Medal.

== Career ==
Neva received his MD from University of Minnesota Medical School in 1946, as part of a Navy training program. He completed his medical residency at Boston City Hospital, followed by service as a medical officer in the United States Navy at the Naval Medical Research Unit-3 in Cairo, Egypt. He spent several years at Harvard University as a researcher. He became a professor at University of Pittsburgh, where he worked with Jonas Salk on a vaccine for polio. While at Pittsburgh, he also isolated ECHO 16, the virus responsible for Boston exanthem disease. This was the first description of that disease. Together with Thomas Weller, he isolated the Rubella virus in 1962. In 1964 he moved back to Harvard to head the Department of Tropical Public Health. In 1969 he joined the National Institutes of Health, as the chief of the Laboratory of Parasitic Diseases at the National Institute of Allergy and Infectious Diseases. He remained at that post until his retirement in 2004.

Neva married his wife, Alice Hanson Neva, before leaving for research with the US Navy in Egypt. They had three children, Karen, Kristin, and Erik.

=== Awards ===
- Ben Kean Medal
- Donald Mackay Medal
- Bailey K. Ashford Meda
- Joseph E. Smadel Lectureship from the Infectious Diseases Society of America
- Presidential Meritorious Executive Rank Award
