= Sergio Aponte Polito =

Mexican Army General

- Military career
- Allegiance: Mexico
- Branch: Mexican Army
- Rank: General
- Conflicts: Mexican drug war, Operation Baja California

Sergio Aponte Polito is a Mexican Army General who was in charge to combat the drug cartels in Tijuana in 2008.

Aponte Polito became notable for publicly denouncing the hidden relations several high-ranking municipal police officers and government officials had with local drug lords.
