= Manuel Alejandro Aponte Gómez =

Mexican professional hitman

- Born: 10 December 1974; Chilpancingo, Guerrero, Mexico
- Died: 9 April 2014 (aged 39); La Cruz de Elota, Sinaloa, Mexico
- Other name: "El Bravo"
- Education: Heroic Military Academy (1993 - 1996)
- Occupation: Professional hitman
- Employer: Mexican Army (1996–2004)
- Organization(s): Sinaloa Cartel, Sonora Cartel and Gulf Cartel

Manuel Alejandro Aponte Gómez (10 December 1974 – 9 April 2014), commonly referred to by his alias "El Bravo" ("The Fierce One"), was a Mexican professional hitman and high-ranking leader of the Sinaloa Cartel, a drug trafficking organization. He was a close lieutenant of the former cartel leader Joaquín "El Chapo" Guzmán.

== Career ==
Manuel Alejandro Aponte Gómez was born in Chilpancingo, Guerrero, Mexico on 10 December 1974. Aponte previously served in the Mexican Armed Forces and joined organized crime between the years 2000 and 2006. After meeting Guzmán, Aponte was appointed as his head of security. As Guzmán became more wanted by numerous law enforcement agencies, Aponte helped Guzmán to escape, by building several tunnels in Northern Mexico. From Guzmán's capture in 2014, Aponte fought for rule over the Sinaloa Cartel.

== Death ==
On April 9, 2014, Aponte was tortured and shot several times. Along with his other associates, his body was dumped in Sinaloa.

== See also ==
- Mexican drug war
