= Christopher Aponte =

American classical ballet dancer

Christopher Aponte is an American classical ballet dancer. Aponte was born in the borough of Manhattan, then moved, at the age of three, to live in the Bronx.

Aponte attended the High School of Performing Arts and received a scholarship to the National Academy of Ballet. Upon graduation, Aponte was enrolled on scholarship to the trainee program of the Harkness Ballet School. He made his dance debut in a public performance at the Delacorte Theatre in Central Park.

Shortly after his debut, Aponte entered the Harkness Ballet Company and rose to become principal dancer. He has traveled extensively with his partner, Gelsey Kirkland. Aponte has performed as principal dancer with the American Ballet Theatre, New York City Ballet, Boston Ballet, and Alvin Ailey Company, and was artistic director of the Spokane Ballet. Aponte has choreographed over forty ballets and is especially known for his interpretation of Ravel's Boléro.
