= José Aponte =

José Aponte may refer to:

- José Aponte Hernández (born 1958), former Speaker of the House of Representatives of Puerto Rico
- José Aponte de la Torre (1941–2007), mayor of Carolina, Puerto Rico, 1984–2007
- José Aponte Dalmau (born 1965), his son, mayor of Carolina, 2007–present
- José Antonio Aponte (died 1812), Cuban activist, military officer and carpenter.
