= Ben Kean =

American physician, author, and researcher (c. 1912 – 1993)

Benjamin H. Kean (c. 1912 – 1993) was an American physician, author, researcher, and professor at Weill Cornell Medicine in New York City. Kean was born in Valparaiso, Indiana, and grew up in West Orange, New Jersey and Manhattan. He graduated from the University of California at Berkeley and earned a medical degree at Columbia University. Kean was an expert in tropical and rare diseases. He helped discover the cause of traveler's diarrhea and was also the personal doctor to Mohammad Reza Pahlavi, who was Shah of Iran from 1941 until 1979. Kean died of colon cancer at the age of 81.

== Career summary ==
After graduating from Columbia University College of Physicians and Surgeons, Kean completed his medical internship and residency at Gorgas Hospital in the Panama Canal Zone and later remained on the hospital's staff. After the start of World War II, he was commissioned into the US Army Medical Corps but remained at Gorgas Hospital, training US military physicians in tropical diseases. Following the war, Kean was the chief health officer for the German state of Hesse during the American occupation. He reached the rank of lieutenant colonel before demobilization in 1946 and subsequently began a career in academic medicine at Cornell.

== Famous patients and colleagues ==
Over the years, Kean worked with various famous people and leaders. He was a doctor for celebrities such as Marcus Wallenberg Jr., Oscar Hammerstein, Edna Ferber, Gertrude Lawrence, Martina Navratilova, and Salvador Dalí. He was also the personal doctor for Mohammad Reza Pahlavi, Shah of Iran from 1941 until 1979. During World War II, Kean found that pilots who were shot down over the ocean were being attacked by sharks. He discussed these dangers with President Roosevelt and as a result, shark repellent was given to pilots to prevent this danger.

== Controversies ==
Over the years, Kean got embroiled in several controversies. He befriended Tim Garrity, a major gambler with ties to organized crime. Kean also became a heavy gambler, and after his bookie's operation was raided in 1959, he appeared in many newspapers and had to attend court, which led to the end of his gambling. He was also alleged to have played a central role in convincing the United States to allow the deposed Shah of Iran to be admitted into the US for medical treatment. President Carter's decision to allow this contributed to the Iran hostage crisis. Kean denied any such role, to the point of suing the journal Science for libel. In a settlement, Science stated that he had acted both professionally and ethically.

== Accomplishments ==
Although Kean was mainly known for helping cure traveler's disease, he had other accomplishments as well. In an autopsy of the writer Sherwood Anderson, Kean was able to find that the cause of death was from a colon puncture, caused by a toothpick-armed olive swallowed in a round of martinis. He also wrote 175 scientific articles and six books. He started the tropical medicine program at Cornell Medical School, where he also became head of the parasitological laboratory.

== Ben Kean Medal ==
Created after Kean's death, the Ben Kean Medal is an honor awarded by the American Society of Tropical Medicine and Hygiene to a clinician or educator who impacts the people around them with the same traditions that Ben Kean first proposed. The first recipient of the medal was Kean's wife, Colette Kean, in 1994, and the first society member to receive it was Franklin A. Neva, in 1995.

== Personal life ==
Kean was married three times and was romantically involved with actress Joan Fontaine for eight years. One of his ex-wives was the dance patron and philanthropist Rebekah Harkness. Kean's autobiography, M.D.: One Doctor's Adventures Among the Famous and Infamous from the Jungles of Panama to a Park Avenue Practice, describes his life, friends, colleagues, and patients in New York City.
