= Boston exanthem disease =

- Specialty: Dermatology

Boston exanthem disease is a cutaneous condition that first occurred as an epidemic in Boston in 1951. It is caused by echovirus 16. The disease tends to afflict children more often than adults, although some adults can become infected, and the symptoms have never been fatal. It shows some clinical similarity to Rubella and Human herpesvirus 6

== Outbreaks ==
=== Boston, 1951 ===
The first known outbreak of Boston exanthem disease occurred in late summer of 1951 in Boston, Massachusetts. The initial symptoms were thought to be Rubella, however the clinical features were different. Patients exhibited no Koplik's spots, the course of the infection was shorter, and the skin lesions differed from Rubella. Two physicians, Franklin A. Neva from the University of Pittsburgh, and Ilse J. Gorbach investigated the outbreak. Through surveys sent to physicians, 18 cases were identified and specimens collected, 15 children and 3 adults.

=== Pittsburgh, 1954 ===
An outbreak was first identified in a suburb of Pittsburgh, Pennsylvania in June, 1954. Investigation in this suburb revealed an additional 17 cases. After notifying area physicians, an additional 7 cases were identified in other parts of the city. Cases occurred in both children and adults, with one adult hospitalized.

== See also ==
- Eruptive pseudoangiomatosis
- Skin lesion
