= Harkness Ballet =

New York ballet company

The Harkness Ballet (1964–1975) was a New York ballet company named after its founder Rebekah Harkness. Harkness inherited her husband's fortune in Standard Oil holdings, and was a dance lover. Harkness funded Joffrey Ballet, but when they refused to rename the company in her honor, she withdrew funding and hired most of the Joffrey dancers for her new company. Joffrey Ballet later moved to Chicago, and continues to function.

== Background ==
Harkness Ballet, established in 1964, gave its debut performance in Cannes in 1965, with George Skibine as director, Marjorie Tallchief as ballerina and a repertory featuring work by Alvin Ailey, Skibine, Eric Bruhn, Brian Macdonald and Stuart Hodes, the company mostly toured abroad, in the major theaters of Europe, to great acclaim, giving its dancers and choreographers a cosmopolitan experience unknown to most of their American colleagues. Its New York debut was in 1967 and Macdonald was also appointed director, succeeded by Lawrence Rhodes (1968) and joined by Benjamin Harkarvy in 1969. The ballet teacher David Howard was recruited in 1966 and became co-director of the school in 1971 with Maria Vegh, who had begun teaching at the school in 1968. In 1970, Harkness combined it with the Harkness Youth Ballet (founded 1969), directed by Ben Stevenson, succeeded by Vicente Nebrada.

In 1972, Harkness purchased a historic theater (Colonial Theatre, built in 1905) across from Lincoln Center and renamed it the Harkness Theater. The theater was completely remodeled with state-of-the-art dance stage flooring and Spanish artist Enrique Senis-Oliver painted ceiling murals, opening with a season by the company in 1974. The company disbanded within the next year. The vitality of the dancers was widely admired and many of the ballets were very erotic, including " After Eden" by John Butler, the homoerotic "Sebastian" (1963) by John Butler to music of Gian-Carlo Menotti, "Monument for a Dead Boy" (1966) by Rudi van Dantzig (born 1933) and "Gemini" (1972) by Vicente Nebrada (born 1930).

The Harkness House for Ballet Arts, housed in the Nathaniel L. McCready House, a four-story mansion on Manhattan's Upper East Side, served as the company's headquarters and official school, which continued for many years after the company closed and became the home to the American Dance Machine. Notable Harkness Ballet Trainee scholarship dancers attending the school included Lawrence Leritz and Patrick Swayze.

The Harkness Ballet was managed by Jeannot B. Cerrone from 1964 to 1975.

== Notable company dancers ==
- Christopher Aponte
- Maria Eglevsky
- Barbara Hancock
- Lone Isaksen
- Judith Jamison
- Finis Jhung
- Lar Lubovitch
- Lawrence Rhodes
- Brunilda Ruiz
- Helgi Tomasson
