= Rebekah Harkness =

American philanthropist (1915–1982)

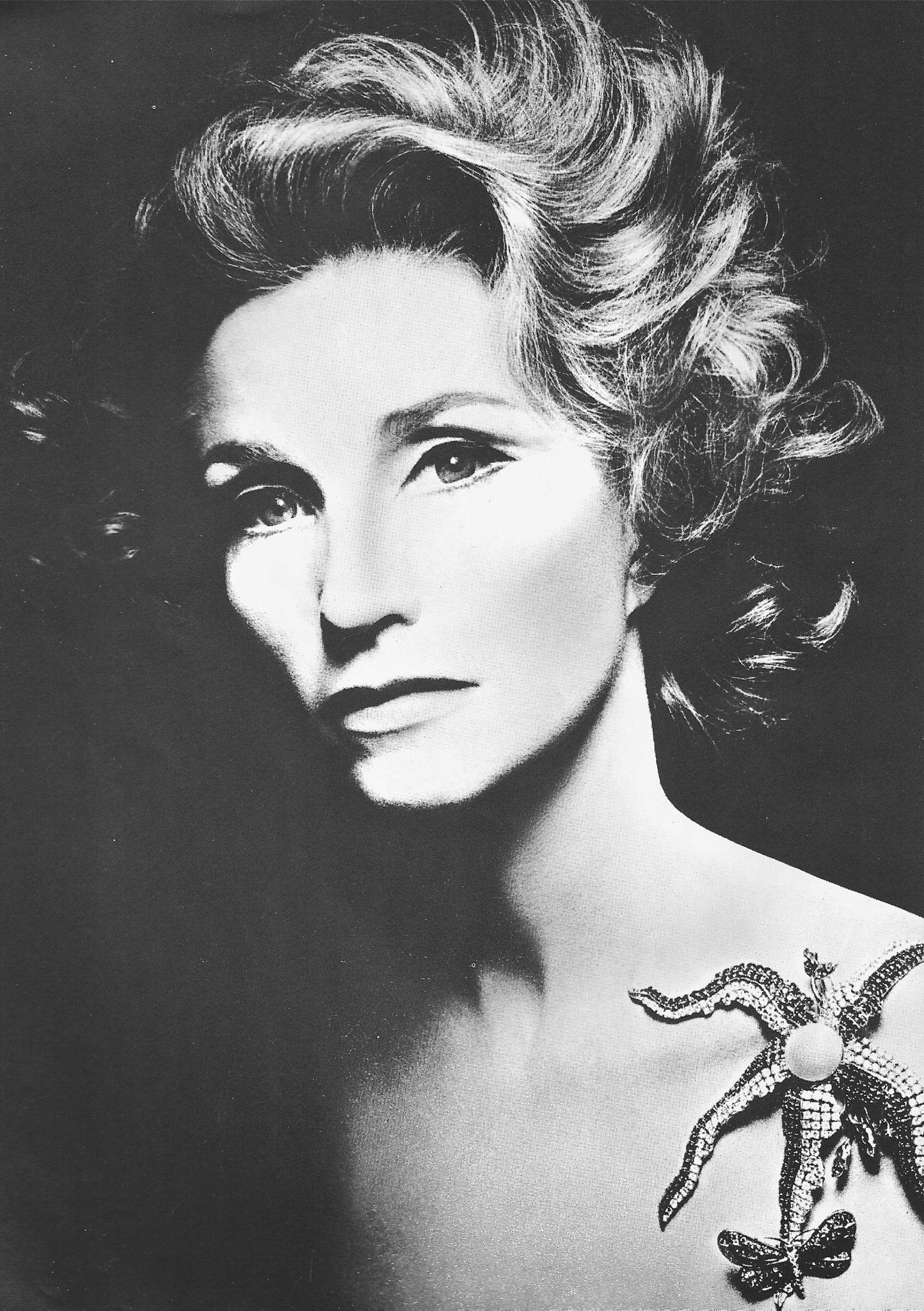
- Harkness in 1972
- Born: Rebekah Semple West; April 17, 1915; St. Louis, Missouri, U.S.
- Died: June 17, 1982 (aged 67); New York City, U.S.
- Other name: Betty Harkness
- Education: John Burroughs School; Fermata
- Known for: Harkness Ballet
- Spouses: Dickson W. Pierce (m. 1939; div. 1946) William Hale Harkness (m. 1947; died 1954) Benjamin H. Kean (m. 1961; div. 1965) Niels Lauersen (m. 1974; div. 1977)
- Children: 3

Rebekah West Harkness (née Semple West; April 17, 1915 – June 17, 1982) also known as Betty Harkness, was an American composer, socialite, sculptor, dance patron, and philanthropist who founded the Harkness Ballet. In 1947, she married William Hale "Bill" Harkness, an attorney and heir to the Standard Oil fortune of William L. Harkness, which made her one of the wealthiest women in America. In addition to her marriage, Harkness also became well known for her personal eccentricities, as well as her contributions to the arts.

== Early life ==
Rebekah Semple West was born in St. Louis, Missouri, in 1915. She was the second daughter of three children to Allen Tarwater West, a stockbroker and co-founder of G. H. Walker & Co., and Rebekah Cook (née Semple) West. Her grandfather founded the St. Louis Union Trust Company. Neither parent was involved in the upbringing of the children, leaving them to be raised primarily by nannies. Harkness took up dancing and ice skating to lose weight and was highly disciplined in both endeavors. She attended the Rossman School and John Burroughs School in St. Louis, and then the Fermata School for Girls in Aiken, South Carolina, from which she graduated in 1932. Harkness was friends with a young Potter Stewart, whom she affectionately called "Potsie," and their relationship was written about by her biographer Craig Unger.

After graduating in 1932, she and a group of female friends formed the Bitch Pack, a sub-culture of local debutantes who enjoyed subverting society events, including lacing punchbowls with mineral oil and performing stripteases on banquet tables. Harkness would also continue to study dance and piano, and studied ballet with Victoria Cassu, who was a student of Anna Pavlova.

== Career ==
In the 1960s, Harkness became well known as a philanthropist and patron of the arts. Through the Rebekah Harkness Foundation, Harkness sponsored Jerome Robbins and the Joffrey Ballet. When the Joffrey Ballet refused to rename their company in Harkness' honor, she withdrew funding and hired most of the Joffrey dancers to her new company, the Harkness Ballet. In addition to founding the Harkness Ballet, Harkness launched a ballet school and home for the company called Harkness House, as well as the refurbished 1,250-seat Colonial Theater, which presented the Harkness Ballet and other dance companies to New York audiences. Through the William Hale Harkness Foundation, she sponsored construction of a medical research building at the New York Hospital and supported a number of medical research projects.

Later in life, she studied with Nadia Boulanger at The American Conservatory, in Fontainebleau, France; at the Institut Jaques-Dalcroze in Geneva; and the Mannes College of Music in New York City. She also studied orchestration with Lee Hoiby.

In 1968, she received an Honorary Doctor of Fine Arts degree from the Franklin Pierce College in Rindge, New Hampshire.

== Public image and philanthropy ==
Following the death in 1954 of her second husband, William Hale Harkness, she inherited his fortune. She soon became the owner of a vast number of properties, and indulged in many luxuries. Harkness' passions for dance and music followed her into adulthood. She used much of her inheritance to become a patron of the ballet, as well as to compose music. Her 1955 tone poem, Safari Suite, was performed at Carnegie Hall, and in 1957 she released an album titled Music With a Heartbeat. Harkness also surrounded herself with other well-known creatives, like yogi B.K.S. Iyengar and Salvador Dalí, who would design her urn upon her death.

Tabloids became fascinated with Harkness due to her alleged eccentricities; supposedly she cleaned her pool with Dom Pérignon champagne and dyed her neighbor's cat green following an argument.

A philanthropist, Harkness supported the Joffrey Ballet for years, as well as the Harkness Ballet Foundation and the William Hale Harkness Foundation. Harkness later donated $2 million to the William Hale Harkness Medical Research Building at the New York Hospital and supported medical research on Parkinson's disease.

== Marriages ==
On June 10, 1939, Harkness married Dickson W. Pierce, the son of Thomas M. Pierce. Before their divorce in 1946, they had two children; Allen Pierce (b. 1940) and Anne Terry Pierce (1944-2005). Following the divorce, Harkness gained custody of both children. Allen shot and killed a man in a brawl and was charged with second-degree murder, the charge eventually being reduced to manslaughter, with Allen serving a total of eight years.

On October 1, 1947, Harkness married William Hale Harkness (1900–1954), the son of William Lamon Harkness, both Standard Oil heirs. They had one child together, Edith Hale Harkness (1948–1982). William Hale Harkness died in August 1954. Their daughter Edith married Kenneth Perry McKinnon in 1971. Over the course of her life Edith was in and out of mental institutions before eventually killing herself shortly after her mother's death.

In 1961, Harkness married Ben Kean (c. 1912–1993), a physician who was a professor of Tropical Medicine at the Cornell Medical College. They divorced in 1965. Anne married Anthony McBride in 1966 and they had a severely brain-damaged child who died at age 10.

In 1974, she married Niels H. Lauersen, another physician, who was 20 years her junior. They divorced in 1977.

== Death ==
Harkness died of stomach cancer in her Manhattan home on June 17, 1982 at the age of 67. During her final days, Harkness began to reconcile with her children. Following her death, a memorial was held at the family home before Harkness was cremated, and her ashes were placed in a $250,000 spinning urn designed by Salvador Dalí, then placed in the Harkness Mausoleum in Woodlawn Cemetery.

== In popular culture ==
Harkness' "Holiday House" in Watch Hill was acquired in 2013 by American singer-songwriter Taylor Swift. In 2020, Swift wrote the song "The Last Great American Dynasty" for her eighth studio album Folklore (2020), in which she tells Harkness' life story and draws parallels between Harkness’ highly publicized life and her own.

An American Ballet Story is a 2022 documentary film directed by Leslie Streit and sponsored by the International Documentary Association. It explores the Harkness' legacy and her company, Harkness Ballet. Streit interviewed former students and teachers of the school and gathered archival video footage of performances for the film.
