= Suburban Legends (song) =

2023 song by Taylor Swift

Song by Taylor Swift

from the album 1989 (Taylor's Version)
- Released: October 27, 2023
- Studio: Conway Recording (Los Angeles); Electric Lady (New York City); Rough Customer (New York City)
- Genre: Synth-pop
- Length: 2:51
- Label: Republic
- Songwriters: Taylor Swift; Jack Antonoff
- Producers: Taylor Swift; Jack Antonoff

Lyric video
- "Suburban Legends" on YouTube

"Suburban Legends" (Note: Subtitled "(Taylor's Version) (From the Vault)") is a song by the American singer-songwriter Taylor Swift, who wrote and produced it with Jack Antonoff. The track was originally intended for her 2014 studio album, 1989, but was included in the 2023 re-recording, 1989 (Taylor's Version). A midtempo synth-pop ballad, "Suburban Legends" features 1980s-inspired synthesizers, a disco groove, and a gentle pulse. The lyrics contain imagery of fantasy and nostalgia: Swift's character reflects on a failed small-town romance and details the thrilling parts of the relationship and its dissolution.

Critics discussed "Suburban Legends" with its similarity to Swift's album Midnights (2022) and her other works. Many praised the songwriting and production while some others found the song lacking and derivative. Commercially, "Suburban Legends" peaked at number 10 on the US Billboard Hot 100 and number 14 on the Billboard Global 200. It reached the top 10 in Australia, Canada, and New Zealand, and further charted in several countries. It also received a gold certification in Australia. Swift performed the song during a Rio de Janeiro show as part of her Eras Tour (2023–2024).

== Background and release ==
The American singer-songwriter Taylor Swift released her fifth studio album, 1989, in October 2014 by Big Machine Records. Its 1980s synth-pop-inspired production marked a departure from the country sound of her previous releases. The album received widespread commercial success, selling over five million copies in the United States within one year. After a dispute with Big Machine over the sale of the masters of Swift's first six studio albums in 2019, she announced that she would re-record them in November 2020. The re-recordings featured tracks from the sessions she had eschewed from their original albums, subtitled "From the Vault". One such track was "Suburban Legends", a song written for 1989 but was excluded from the final track list.

"Suburban Legends" was included on Swift's fourth re-recorded album, 1989 (Taylor's Version), which was released on October 27, 2023, by Republic Records. On November 7, Swift sang the song with a piano during the Rio de Janeiro stop of her Eras Tour (2023–2024). It charted within the top 10 in the countries of Australia (8), New Zealand (9), and Canada (10). In the United States, the song debuted and peaked at number 10 on the US Billboard Hot 100 with 20.2 million streams, extending her record of most top-10 entries by a female artist on the chart. In the United Kingdom, it reached the OCC's streaming (16), downloads (61), and sales charts (72) and peaked at number 14 on Billboard's U.K. Songs. Elsewhere, "Suburban Legends" peaked at number 14 on both Billboard Global 200 and Ireland, number 18 in Singapore, number 25 in the Philippines, number 61 in Portugal, and number 87 in Sweden. It received a gold certification from the Australian Recording Industry Association.

== Music and lyrics ==
"Suburban Legends"
A sample of "Suburban Legends", presenting the synth-pop production with the 1980s-inspired synthesizers, disco groove, and gentle pulse

"Suburban Legends" is 2 minutes and 51 seconds long. Swift wrote and produced the song with Jack Antonoff, who recorded it with Laura Sisk at Conway Recording Studios in Los Angeles, and Rough Customer Studio and Electric Lady Studios both in New York City. Antonoff provided programming, background vocals, and instruments, including DX100, Juno 6, and synthesizers. Other musicians on the track were Evan Smith (guitar, synthesizers, saxophones), Michael Riddleberger (drums, percussion), Mikey Freedom Hart (Farfisa, guitars, synthesizers), Sean Hutchinson (drums, percussion), and Zem Audu (synthesizers). It was mixed by Serban Ghenea at MixStar Studios in Virginia Beach and mastered by Randy Merrill at Sterling Sound in Edgewater, New Jersey.

"Suburban Legends" is a midtempo synth-pop ballad. The production has 1980s-inspired synthesizers that critics described as "sparkly", "swirling", and "cinematic". The outro features the synths making a dissipating sound, according to Billboard's Jason Lipshutz. The track also contains a gentle pulse and a swelling disco groove. Jeff Nelson from People described the production as "driving, sometimes wind chime-y". The lyrics recount a faded romance set in a small town. In the song, Swift's character is skeptical to her lover ("[U]nmarked numbers popping up on her beau's phone are caught in her peripheral vision") but also has the inability to let go ("You were so magnetic it was almost obnoxious"). She expresses her commitment to maintaining the romance ("I didn't come here to make friends" / "We were born to be suburban legends") and knows that a single kiss could hypnotize her for a long time ("You kissed me in a way that's gonna screw me up forever"). The song addresses the burgeoning side and the breakup of the relationship using both fantasy and nostalgia imagery. In the second verse, she imagines herself walking to a high school reunion with a classmate who is now her partner, hoping to get the reactions of everyone. The relationship ends in the bridge as Swift finds out herself because the partner was "too polite to do it" and accepts what happened in the end.

Critics commented that "Suburban Legends" would have been for her album Midnights (2022) (Note: Attributed to John Wohlmacher of Beats Per Minute, Jeff Nelson of People, Rob Sheffield of Rolling Stone, Annabel Gutterman of Time, and Chris Willman of Variety) and perceived similarities with the album's closing track, "Mastermind". (Note: Attributed to Furvah Shah of Cosmopolitan, Mary Sirosky of Consequence, and Gutterman) Mike DeWald of Riff Magazine opined that the song had "a more defined [...] bounce" from the album, while Furvah Shah from Cosmopolitan wrote that it was "Midnights-esque". Shaad D'Souza of Pitchfork believed it had the "dense, largely rhymeless run-on style" that defined the album and Folklore (2020). Critics also found similarities from "Suburban Legends" to Swift's other works. In NJ.com, Bobby Olivier opined that the song had high school imagery that reprised those from "You Belong with Me" (2009) and "Miss Americana & the Heartbreak Prince" (2019). Jake Viswanath from Bustle felt that the songwriting was similar to "'Tis the Damn Season" (2020). Harper's Bazaar Australia's Dani Maher believed that the track's aesthetic recalled "New Romantics" (2016). For NME, Hollie Geragthy thought its lyricism had the "evocative detail" of her previous works.

== Critical reception ==
Critics generally praised "Suburban Legends" for its songwriting and production. Mikael Wood of the Los Angeles Times ranked it first in his list of the album's "From the Vault" tracks, and the newspaper included it at number 26 on their list of the best 100 songs of 2023. Geraghty thought that the song displayed a "sweeping, evocative storytelling". Melissa Ruggieri of USA Today believed that it featured some of her "most vivid" lyrics. Fred Thomas from AllMusic wrote that the track had a subdued production that differed it to the "overenthusiastic electro-pop exclamation" of "New Romantics". In a ranking of all Swift's "From the Vault" tracks, Annabel Gutterman of Time included the song at number eight and called it a "total bop" where Swift was at her best being nostalgic. Nina Miyashita from Vogue Australia believed that the track was tender and that its theme of nostalgia was matured by her self-awareness. Kelsey Barnes of The Line of Best Fit labeled the song as "sprawling" and felt that its rhyme schemes were simple yet effective. Rolling Stone's writer Rob Sheffield found the track witty, while Mark Sutherland from the magazine's UK edition thought it was "superb" and had "classically Swiftian one-liners". Rachel Martin of the Notion said that the song showcased Swift's ability of making "a pop song [that is] full of unequivocal storytelling".

Some critics were more reserved in their praise. Olivier placed the song last on his list of the album's "From the Vault" tracks and wrote that it was fun but not "especially memorable". Atwood Magazine's review felt that "Suburban Legends" had awkward lyrics and attributed it to the track's underdevelopment. Three journalists of the BBC and D'Souza said that the lyrics and melody were not as sharp compared to the songs on 1989. D'Souza, however, thought it showcased Swift's skill of "channeling the cocktail of victimhood and superiority" that happens following a breakup. Ranking all her "From the Vault" tracks, Josh Kurp of Uproxx listed the song at fourteenth and felt that its production was too similar to the fellow album track "Now That We Don't Talk". John Wohlmacher from Beats Per Minute believed that it was not that engaging and that the composition was derivative.

== Personnel ==
Credits are taken from the liner notes of 1989 (Taylor's Version).

- Taylor Swift – vocals, songwriting, production
- Jack Antonoff – songwriting, production, programming, DX100, Juno 6, synthesizers, background vocals, recording
- Evan Smith – guitar, saxophones, synthesizers, recording
- Michael Riddleberger – drums, percussion, recording
- Mikey Freedom Hart – Rhodes, Farfisa, guitars, synthesizers, recording
- Sean Hutchinson – drums, percussion, recording
- Zem Audu – synthesizers, recording
- David Hart – recording
- Laura Sisk – recording
- Jack Manning – additional engineering
- Jon Sher – additional engineering
- Meagan Searl – additional engineering
- Serban Ghenea – mixing
- Bryce Bordone – engineer for mix
- Randy Merrill – mastering

== Charts ==
Chart performance
Chart (2023)	Peak position
Australia (ARIA)	8
Canada Hot 100 (Billboard)	10
Global 200 (Billboard)	14
Greece International (IFPI)	20
Ireland (Billboard)	14
New Zealand (Recorded Music NZ)	9
Philippines (Billboard)	25
Portugal (AFP)	61
Singapore (RIAS)	18
Sweden (Sverigetopplistan)	87
UK (Billboard)	14
UK Singles Downloads (OCC)	61
UK Singles Sales (OCC)	72
UK Streaming (OCC)	16
US Billboard Hot 100	10

== Certification ==
Certifications
Region	Certification	Certified units/sales
Australia (ARIA)	Gold	35,000^{‡}
^{‡} Sales+streaming figures based on certification alone.
