= Say Don't Go =

2023 song by Taylor Swift

Song by Taylor Swift

from the album 1989 (Taylor's Version)
- Written: c. December 2013
- Released: October 27, 2023
- Studio: Conway Recording (Los Angeles); Electric Lady (New York); Rough Customer (Brooklyn); Sharp Sonics (Los Angeles)
- Genre: Electro; new-age; pop rock; power ballad; synth-pop
- Length: 4:39
- Label: Republic
- Songwriters: Taylor Swift; Diane Warren
- Producers: Taylor Swift; Jack Antonoff

Lyric video
- "Say Don't Go" on YouTube

"Say Don't Go" (Note: Subtitled "(Taylor's Version) (From the Vault)") is a song by the American singer-songwriter Taylor Swift. She wrote the track with Diane Warren in 2013 for her fifth studio album, 1989 (2014), but left it out of the final track-list. Swift re-recorded the song and produced it with Jack Antonoff for 1989's re-recording, 1989 (Taylor's Version) (2023). "Say Don't Go" is an electro, new-age, pop rock, and synth-pop power ballad with a production featuring 1980s-inspired drum beats, pizzicato arpeggios, and isolated vocal patterns. The lyrics are about a narrator attempting to maintain her unfruitful relationship.

The song was met with generally positive reviews from critics, a number of whom viewed it as a highlight amongst the "From the Vault" tracks. Many praised the production while some commended Swift's songwriting. Commercially, "Say Don't Go" peaked at number four on the Billboard Global 200 and reached the top ten on singles charts in Australia, Canada, Ireland, New Zealand, the Philippines, Singapore, the United Kingdom, and the United States. It received certifications in Australia, Brazil, New Zealand, and the UK. Swift performed the song live twice on the Eras Tour (2023–2024).

== Background and release ==
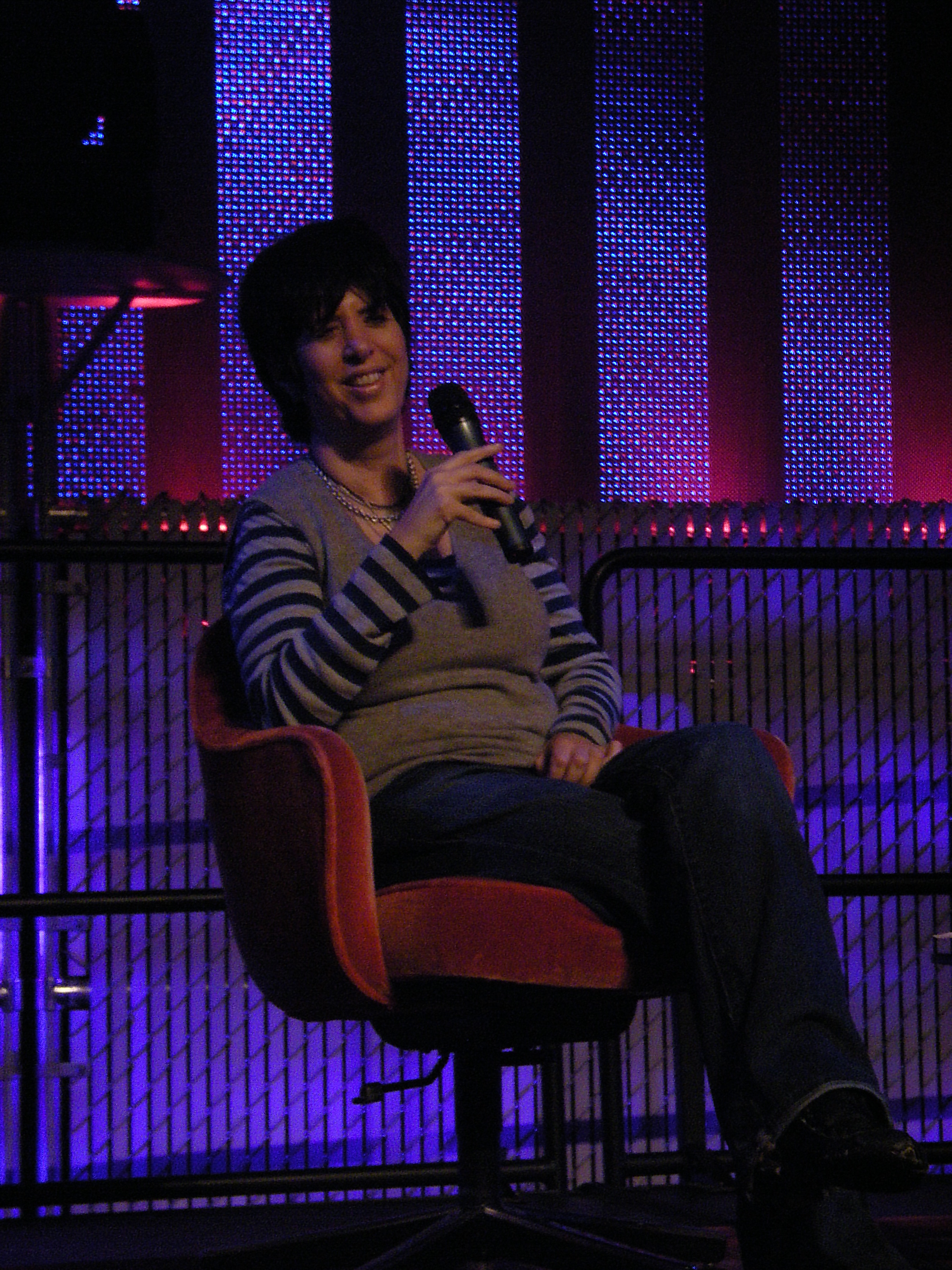
Swift co-wrote "Say Don't Go" with Diane Warren (pictured).

In mid-2013, Swift began writing songs for her fifth studio album, 1989, which was released in October 2014 by Big Machine Records. Inspired by 1980s synth-pop, she conceived the album as her first "official pop" record after she had marketed her first four albums to country radio, and transform her artistry and image from country to pop. For this to happen, Swift recruited new collaborators for the album, including the American songwriter Diane Warren. She wrote "Say Don't Go" with Swift, doing it "from scratch" within "the last few days of 2013". Warren recalled in a Rolling Stone interview that she was impressed with Swift for the specificity in her songwriting and how eager she was to show the track to her audience. Several days later on New Year's Day in 2014, Swift recorded and played an acoustic guitar for the demo of "Say Don't Go" at Warren's office. However, the song did not made it into the final track-list of the album.

Following a dispute with Big Machine over the sale of the masters of Swift's first six studio albums, she began re-recording them in November 2020; the re-recordings featured tracks from the sessions she had eschewed from their originals, subtitled as "From the Vault". 1989's re-recording, 1989 (Taylor's Version), contains five of them including "Say Don't Go", which was listed at number 18 out of 21 songs on the track-list. All of the "From the Vault" tracks were produced by Swift and Jack Antonoff, who originally worked on three songs for 1989. Before the album's release, Swift sent the track to Warren via email. Warren was impressed by it, telling Rolling Stone: "I said, 'Oh my god, this is fucking awesome' [...] I hope they release this as a single because I think it's a fucking hit". 1989 (Taylor's Version) was released on October 27, 2023, by Republic Records.

On November 26, Swift performed the track live on guitar as a "surprise song" in São Paulo as part of the Eras Tour (2023–2024). She sang it again as part of a piano medley with her songs "Welcome to New York" and "Clean" in Stockholm on May 18, 2024.

== Composition ==
"Say Don't Go"
A sample of "Say Don't Go", an electro, new-age, pop rock, and synth-pop power ballad with 1980s-inspired drum beats and pizzicato arpeggios.

"Say Don't Go" is four minutes and thirty-nine seconds long. It was recorded at Conway Recording Studios (Los Angeles), Electric Lady Studios (New York), Rough Customer Studio (Brooklyn), and Sharp Sonics Studios (Los Angeles). Antonoff and Evan Smith handled programming for the song, and the former provided background vocals. Antonoff played acoustic guitar, electric guitar, Mellotron, percussion, and synthesizers, Smith played saxophone and synthesizers, Mikey Freedom Hart played bass, electric guitar, Rhodes, and synthesizers, Michael Riddleberger and Sean Hutchinson played drums, and Zem Audu played synthesizers. Smith's performance was recorded at Pleasure Hill Recording in Portland; Hart's performance was recorded at Big Mercy Sound in Brooklyn; Sean Hutchinson's performance was recorded at Hutchinson Sound in Brooklyn; Audu's performance was recorded at Audu Music Studio in Brooklyn. The track was mixed at MixStar Studios in Virginia Beach.

A power ballad, "Say Don't Go" incorporates electro, new-age, and pop rock in addition to the album's 1980s synth-pop sound. The production features 1980s-inspired drum beats, pizzicato arpeggios, and isolated vocal patterns. It has slow pacing for the beginning, which Bobby Olivier from NJ.com found to be a "slinky intro" and likened the music to that of the fellow album track "Clean". The song gradually builds up to what Clash critics deemed an "almost overwhelming chorus". The part features percussive hooks that Shaad D'Souza from Pitchfork thought it resembles the style of the American band Haim. In the post-chorus, it has backing vocals; Hugh G. Puddles of Sputnikmusic opined it evokes the Irish singer Enya, while Billboard's Jason Lipshutz said the harmonies recalls her 2022 album Midnights.

The lyrics are about a narrator hanging on to an unfruitful relationship. The narrator begs her lover to give her one more reason to stay: "Halfway out the door but it won't close / I'm holding out hope for you to say, don't go / I would stay forever if you say, don't go". Lipshutz found the lyric, "Why'd you have to twist the knife? / Walk away and leave me bleedin', bleedin'!", to be in line with Swift's country pop works. Several critics wrote that the song had similar themes and lyrics to the fellow album tracks "All You Had to Do Was Stay" and "I Wish You Would"; (Note: Attributed to Rolling Stone's Angie Martoccio, The Line of Best Fit's Kelsey Barnes, The Telegraph's Neil McCormick, and Variety's Chris Willman) Olivier believed that "Say Don't Go" was cut out of the original album due to its "similar content". D'Souza thought the lyrics crossed between Swift's 2012 album Red and 1989. For AllMusic, Fred Thomas compared the verse to the Outfield song "Your Love" (1986).

== Commercial performance ==
Upon the release of 1989 (Taylor's Version), "Say Don't Go" debuted and peaked at number five on the United States's Billboard Hot 100 with first-week streams of 25.8 million. It extended Swift's record of the most top-ten entries by a female artist on the chart. The song was also Warren's 33rd top-ten song as a writer and her first since Faith Hill's "There You'll Be" (2001), extending her span of top-ten entries to forty years and six months.

On the Billboard Global 200, "Say Don't Go" reached number four with 53.4 million streams. With five other tracks from the album, it made Swift the first artist to occupy the entire top six of the Global 200. The song additionally extended her record for most top-ten entries by a female artist on that chart. Elsewhere, "Say Don't Go" peaked within the top ten on various national charts: at number three in Australia and New Zealand, number four in the Philippines, number five in Canada, and number seven in Singapore. It additionally peaked at number seven on both Billboard's Ireland Songs and U.K. Songs. The song has received certifications in several countries, including silver in the United Kingdom, gold in Brazil and New Zealand, and platinum in Australia.

== Critical reception ==
"Say Don't Go" received generally positive reviews from critics; a number of them selected the song as a highlight amongst the "From the Vault" tracks of 1989 (Taylor's Version). (Note: Attributed to Pitchfork's Shaad D'Souza, Billboard's Jason Lipshutz, and The A.V. Club's Mary Kate Carr) Alex Hopper of American Songwriter wrote that the song was "fun" and viewed it as a "soon-to-be fan [favorite]". Many commented on the production. Mark Sutherland of Rolling Stone UK described the song as "intriguing" and picked it as one of the tracks that "subtly point out the musical progress Swift has made" after 1989. Clash and Lipshutz both lauded the track's production, with Clash further elaborating that it added suspense in her delivery. D'Souza said the song "shimmers with tension", while Paddles thought it was "Swift's most intrepid journey [...] into the '80s cheese cave" on the album.

Some critics focused on the songwriting. Ed Dani Maher from Harper's Bazaar Australia deemed it the catchiest and the "instantly lovable" among the "From the Vault" tracks and opined that it had a sing-along chorus. Power of the i thought the song was "great" and a reminder of Swift's "effervescence" as a songwriter that only a few can match. Annabel Gutterman from Time found the lyrics vulnerable. Kelsey Barnes from The Line of Best Fit believed that the collaboration between Swift and Warren was a success; Paolo Ragusa of Consequence agreed in a ranking of every song Jack Antonoff had produced, describing the song as "warm and enjoyable", but criticized the "Say! Don't! Go!" shouts of the chorus. In contrast, Rachel Aroesti of The Guardian deemed the lyrics "decent if unremarkable".

== Personnel ==
Credits are adapted from the liner notes of 1989 (Taylor's Version).

- Taylor Swift – vocals, songwriting, production
- Diane Warren – songwriting
- Jack Antonoff – production, recording, acoustic guitar, electric guitar, Mellotron, percussion, synths, programming, background vocals
- Evan Smith – saxophone, synths, programming, synth recording
- Mikey Freedom Hart – bass, electric guitar, Rhodes, synths, synth recording
- Michael Riddleberger – drums, drum recording
- Sean Hutchinson – drums, drum recording
- Zem Audu – synths, synth recording
- David Hart – recording
- Laura Sisk – recording
- Jack Manning – assistant recording
- Jon Sher – assistant recording
- Megan Searl – assistant recording
- Serban Ghenea – mixing
- Bryce Bordone – engineering for mix
- Randy Merrill – mastering

== Charts ==
Chart performance
Chart (2023)	Peak position
Australia (ARIA)	3
Belgium (Billboard)	24
Brazil Hot 100 (Billboard)	79
Canada Hot 100 (Billboard)	5
Czech Republic Singles Digital (ČNS IFPI)	53
France (SNEP)	134
Global 200 (Billboard)	4
Greece International (IFPI)	11
Ireland (Billboard)	7
Lithuania (AGATA)	73
Malaysia (Billboard)	14
Malaysia International (RIM)	12
New Zealand (Recorded Music NZ)	3
Norway (VG-lista)	31
Philippines (Billboard)	4
Poland (Polish Streaming Top 100)	92
Portugal (AFP)	31
Singapore (RIAS)	7
Slovakia Singles Digital (ČNS IFPI)	15
Spain (Promusicae)	89
Sweden (Sverigetopplistan)	47
UAE (IFPI)	16
UK (Billboard)	7
UK Singles Downloads (Official Charts)	32
UK Singles Sales (OCC)	37
UK Streaming (OCC)	9
US Billboard Hot 100	5
Vietnam (Vietnam Hot 100)	41

== Certifications ==
Certifications
Region	Certification	Certified units/sales
Australia (ARIA)	Platinum	70,000^{‡}
Brazil (Pro-Música Brasil)	Gold	20,000^{‡}
New Zealand (RMNZ)	Gold	15,000^{‡}
United Kingdom (BPI)	Silver	200,000^{‡}
^{‡} Sales+streaming figures based on certification alone.
