= "Slut!" =

2023 single by Taylor Swift

"'Slut!'"

Single by Taylor Swift

from the album 1989 (Taylor's Version)
- Released: October 27, 2023
- Studio: Conway Recording (Hollywood); Electric Lady (New York); Rough Customer (Brooklyn); Sharp Sonics (Los Angeles)
- Genre: Synth-pop
- Length: 3:00
- Label: Republic
- Songwriters: Taylor Swift; Jack Antonoff; Patrik Berger
- Producers: Taylor Swift; Jack Antonoff; Patrik Berger

Taylor Swift singles chronology
"Cruel Summer" (2023)	"'Slut!'" (2023)	"Is It Over Now?" (2023)

Lyric video
- "'Slut!'" on YouTube

"'Slut!'" (Note: The quotation marks are part of the title. The song is officially titled "'Slut!' (Taylor's Version) (From the Vault)".) is a song by the American singer-songwriter Taylor Swift, who wrote and produced it with Jack Antonoff and Patrik Berger. The song was intended for but ultimately left out of Swift's fifth studio album, 1989 (2014). Following a 2019 dispute regarding ownership of Swift's masters, the song was produced for Swift's re-recording of 1989, titled 1989 (Taylor's Version) (2023). "'Slut!'" was released for streaming and download on October 27, 2023, via Republic Records; the same day, Universal Music released the song to Italian radio as the re-recorded album's lead-single. An acoustic version was released for limited-time download as part of a deluxe digital release of the album.

"'Slut!'" is a 1980s-inspired mid-tempo synth-pop song incorporating soft synthesizers, electronic elements, and gentle vocals. The lyrics are about embracing a romance in spite of public scrutiny. Music critics interpreted the title as a reference to the slut-shaming Swift had experienced; they gave the song positive reviews, with praise focusing on the production and the playful lyrics. Commercially, "'Slut!'" peaked at number three on both the Billboard Global 200 and Billboard Hot 100 and reached the top 10 on charts in Australia, Canada, Ireland, New Zealand, Singapore, and the United Kingdom.

== Background ==
After signing a new contract with Republic Records, the singer-songwriter Taylor Swift began re-recording her first six studio albums in November 2020. The decision followed a public 2019 dispute between Swift and the talent manager Scooter Braun, who acquired Big Machine Records, including the masters of Swift's albums which the label had released. By re-recording the albums, Swift had full ownership of the new masters, which enabled her to control the licensing of her songs for commercial use and therefore substituted the Big Machine–owned masters. From July 2021 to July 2023, Swift released three re-recorded albums of her earlier releases: Fearless (Taylor's Version), Red (Taylor's Version), and Speak Now (Taylor's Version); each album also featured several unreleased "From the Vault" tracks that she had written but left out of the original albums' track listings.

Republic Records released Swift's fourth re-recorded album, 1989 (Taylor's Version), on October 27, 2023, on the ninth anniversary of her fifth original studio album, 1989 (2014). The original album was Swift's first "official pop" album after she had marketed her first four albums to country radio, and it transformed her artistry and image from country to pop. As with her other re-recorded projects, 1989 (Taylor's Version) features five newly recorded "From the Vault" tracks that Swift had written but left out of the original track listing. Prior to the release, on September 19, Swift teased the track list by posting a video of an animation on Instagram featuring the characters "T-S-!-U-L" emerging from a blue vault, which fans and journalists interpreted to be a teaser for one of the five vault tracks. Swift released the track list on September 21, confirming "'Slut!'" to be the 17th track of the album's 21 songs on the standard edition.

Around the time when 1989 was released, following a series of publicized romances with other celebrities such as Harry Styles, John Mayer, and Jake Gyllenhaal, the media portrayed Swift as a "serial dater". She addressed the subject in various interviews and satirized the media's portrayal of her on the album's second single, "Blank Space". As with "Blank Space", "'Slut!'" has lyrics discussing the media perception of her as a young woman with numerous romantic attachments. Swift shared via Tumblr that she had to choose between "Blank Space" and "'Slut!'" for the original 1989 as both tracks addressed similar themes; she added that for her, the "California" atmosphere of "'Slut!'" was out of place for the New York-inspired album.

== Production and lyrics ==
"'Slut!'"
Incorporating gleaming synthesizers and gentle backing vocals, "'Slut!'" describes a romantic relationship persisting over public scrutiny.

Swift wrote and produced "'Slut!'" with Jack Antonoff and Patrik Berger. Antonoff provided backing vocals and recorded the song with Laura Sisk at Rough Customer Studio and Electric Lady Studios in New York and Sharp Sonics Studios and Conway Recording Studios in Los Angeles. Antonoff and Berger programmed the track, assisted by engineers Jack Manning, Megan Searl, and Jon Sher. Both Antonoff and Berger played synthesizers; the former also played bass and guitar. The track was mixed by Serban Ghenea at MixStar Studios in Virginia Beach, Virginia, and mastered by Randy Merrill at Sterling Sound in Edgewater, New Jersey.

"'Slut!'" is a synth-pop song that runs for exactly three minutes. It has a mid-tempo production that incorporates 1980s-influenced synthesizers, electronic elements, and gentle backing vocals; the Clash critic Alex Berry added that the production features a variety of "modern" instruments. Some critics commented that despite the impression of an uptempo song brought by the exclamation mark in its title, "'Slut!'" turned out to be a gentle and tender track. (Note: Attributed to Harper's Bazaar Australia's Dani Maher, Rolling Stone's Brittany Spanos, and The Washington Post's Emily Yahr) It has a slow pace; Insider's Callie Ahlgrim and Rolling Stone's Brittany Spanos described the song as a "slow dance", while Ed Power from the i characterized it as a "slo-mo power ballad". Alyssa Bailey of Elle called it "dreamy pop". Chris Willman from Variety and Bobby Olivier from NJ.com said "'Slut!'" was reminiscent of Swift's 2022 album Midnights; the latter cited the "sultry, late-night haze" evoked a "dark and dreamy" atmosphere and said the synth soundscape resembled the Midnights track "Maroon". The Line of Best Fit critic Kelsey Barnes thought that "'Slut!'" was musically reminiscent of the "Lana Del Rey-tinged" "Wildest Dreams".

The lyrics of "'Slut!'" are about an intense romance despite the criticism one may receive for it. (Note: As discussed by The Washington Post's Emily Yahr, Elle's Alyssa Bailey, and Rolling Stone's Angie Martoccio) In the liner notes of 1989 (Taylor's Version), Swift expresses that she was a target of slut-shaming and it took a toll on her. As a response, she wrote "'Slut!'" to address the criticism surrounding her dating life. In the second verse, Swift takes the opportunity to subtly respond to those who criticize her for her relationships ("Everyone wants him, that was my crime"). She is aware of the misogynistic disapproval that she might face ("I'll pay the price, you won't"). The lyric "Love thorns all over this rose, I'll pay the price, you won't" drew comparisons to the lyrics "Screaming, crying, perfect storms, I can make all the tables turn, Rose garden filled with thorns" in "Blank Space", highlighting the contrasting standards held to the romantic lives of men and women. (Note: As discussed by Elle's Alyssa Bailey, Entertainment Weekly's Lauren Huff, and Time's Moises Mendes II) Yahr of The Washington Post said the lyrics in "'Slut!'" conveyed Swift's frustration. Willman from Variety interpreted the lyrics "But if I'm all dressed up, They might as well be looking at us, If they call me a 'slut!', You know it might be worth it for once" as Swift expressing less concern about how her dating life might impact her public image. Mikael Wood of the Los Angeles Times thought the lyric "If I'm gonna be drunk, might as well be drunk in love" was a reference to Beyoncé's "Drunk in Love" (2013).

== Critical reception ==
The song received positive reviews upon release. Angie Martoccio of Rolling Stone called the song a "stunner" and described it as "a hazy, shimmering ode to being unabashedly in love, even if you're shamed and sexualized for it". In a review by The Line of Best Fit's Kelsey Barnes, the track was the "most surprising" of the Vault tracks as it strayed away from the "'Blank Space' satirical tongue-in-cheek" anticipated by fans. Barnes added that Swift shouting "slut", which reverberates across the song, was "empowering". Similarly, Dani Maher of Harper's Bazaar Australia said the song's gentle and tender sound was a surprise as she expected a similar "sardonic smirk" approach of "Blank Space". The PopMatters critic Jefferey Davis picked "'Slut!'" as the most memorable vault track from the album. Olivier ranked it second out of the five vault tracks and described it as "ultimately triumphant". Rachel Aroesti of The Guardian called the song "a shimmering tale of inappropriate sexual adventure". While reviewing the album as a whole, American Songwriter's Alex Hopper called the song "deliciously hedonistic and playful". Meanwhile, Adam White in The Independent described the song as "nicely gentle and airy". Lauren Huff of Entertainment Weekly viewed the track as Swift's proclamation that "if people are going to judge and mock you anyway, you might as well just keep on living and take the plunge".

In less enthusiastic reviews, Shaad D'Souza of Pitchfork and Mikael Wood of the Los Angeles Times deemed "'Slut!'" the weakest vault track; the former said it was "ambling and aimless" compared to other tracks, and the latter wrote: "Strong concept, so-so execution." Lindsay Zoladz from The New York Times thought that the song was "half-baked" because, despite an insightful and self-aware premise about slut-shaming, the lyrics "[center] the salvation of romance, as if the affection of a decent man [...] can rescue a woman from the systemic scrutiny of sexism".

== Release and commercial performance ==
On the day of the album's release, "'Slut!'" was released as a single with a distinct cover art on Apple Music and was sent to Italian radio by Universal Music. On November 9, an acoustic version of the song was released as a bonus track of a deluxe edition of the album, titled 1989 (Taylor's Version) [Deluxe +], exclusively on Swift's website; this release lasted for only one day. Swift performed "'Slut!'" live for the first time during the acoustic segment of a Buenos Aires concert on November 12, 2023, as part of her sixth headlining concert tour, the Eras Tour. She performed it two additional times as part of mashups with "False God" in Singapore on March 8, 2024 and in Gelsenkirchen on July 17, 2024.

"'Slut!'" peaked in the top ten on charts of Canada (3), Australia (4), New Zealand (5), the United Kingdom (5), Ireland (6), and Singapore (10). In the United States, it debuted and peaked at number three on the Billboard Hot 100 with 27 million streams, behind fellow album tracks "Is It Over Now?" and "Now That We Don't Talk". On the Billboard Global 200, the song reached number three, with 55 million streams. Swift achieved the most top-ten entries for a female artist on that chart.

== Credits and personnel ==
- Taylor Swift – lead vocals, songwriting, production
- Jack Antonoff – songwriting, production, background vocals, record engineering, programming, synthesizer
- Patrik Berger – songwriting, production, bass, guitar, programming, synthesizer
- Serban Ghenea – mixing
- Bryce Bordone – mix engineering
- Laura Sisk – record engineering
- Randy Merrill – master engineering
- Ryan Smith – master engineering

== Charts ==
Chart performance for "'Slut!'"
Chart (2023–2024)	Peak position
Australia (ARIA)	4
Brazil Hot 100 (Billboard)	96
Canada Hot 100 (Billboard)	3
Czech Republic Singles Digital (ČNS IFPI)	69
Denmark (Tracklisten)	33
France (SNEP)	137
Germany (GfK)	45
Global 200 (Billboard)	3
Greece International (IFPI)	12
India International (IMI)	13
Ireland (IRMA)	6
Japan Hot Overseas (Billboard Japan)	16
Latvia (LaIPA)	20
Lithuania (AGATA)	49
Malaysia (Billboard)	19
Malaysia International (RIM)	17
MENA (IFPI)	19
Netherlands (Single Top 100)	38
New Zealand (Recorded Music NZ)	5
Norway (VG-lista)	17
Philippines (Billboard)	12
Poland (Polish Streaming Top 100)	55
Portugal (AFP)	32
Singapore (RIAS)	10
Slovakia Singles Digital (ČNS IFPI)	66
Sweden (Sverigetopplistan)	21
UAE (IFPI)	15
UK Singles (Official Charts)	5
US Billboard Hot 100	3
Venezuela (Record Report)	88
Vietnam (Vietnam Hot 100)	39

== Certifications ==
Certifications for "'Slut!'"
Region	Certification	Certified units/sales
Australia (ARIA)	Platinum	70,000^{‡}
Brazil (Pro-Música Brasil)	Gold	20,000^{‡}
New Zealand (RMNZ)	Gold	15,000^{‡}
United Kingdom (BPI)	Silver	200,000^{‡}
^{‡} Sales+streaming figures based on certification alone.

== Release history ==
Release dates and formats for "'Slut!'"
Region	Date	Format	Label(s)	Ref.
Various	October 27, 2023	Digital download; streaming	Republic	
Italy	October 27, 2023	Radio airplay	Universal	
