= I Wish You Would (Taylor Swift song) =

2014 song by Taylor Swift

Song by Taylor Swift

from the album 1989
- Released: October 27, 2014
- Studio: Lamby's House, New York; Conway Recording, Los Angeles
- Genre: Synth-pop; bubblegum
- Length: 3:27
- Label: Big Machine
- Songwriters: Taylor Swift; Jack Antonoff
- Producers: Taylor Swift; Jack Antonoff

Audio video
- "I Wish You Would" on YouTube

"I Wish You Would (Taylor's Version)"

Song by Taylor Swift

from the album 1989 (Taylor's Version)
- Released: October 27, 2023
- Studio: Conway Recording, Los Angeles; Electric Lady, New York; Rough Customer, New York; Sharp Sonics, Los Angeles
- Length: 3:27
- Label: Republic
- Songwriters: Taylor Swift; Jack Antonoff
- Producers: Taylor Swift; Jack Antonoff

Lyric video
- "I Wish You Would (Taylor's Version)" on YouTube

"I Wish You Would" is a song by the American singer-songwriter Taylor Swift from her fifth studio album, 1989 (2014). She wrote and produced the song with Jack Antonoff, who developed the track from his initial sampling of the snare drums on Fine Young Cannibals' 1989 song "She Drives Me Crazy". A synth-pop and bubblegum song, "I Wish You Would" is instrumented by a staccato guitar lick, dense synths and snares, and layered vocals. The lyrics are about two ex-lovers longing for each other.

Several critics commended the production elements of "I Wish You Would" for featuring a nostalgic feel of the 1980s while sounding new, but a few others deemed it a weaker track for Swift. The song received certifications in Australia and the United Kingdom. Following a 2019 dispute regarding the ownership of Swift's back catalog, she re-recorded the song as "I Wish You Would (Taylor's Version)" for the re-recorded album 1989 (Taylor's Version) (2023). The re-recorded song charted at number 26 on the Billboard Global 200 and reached the top 40 in Canada, New Zealand, and the United States.

== Background and production ==
Inspired by 1980s synth-pop, Swift named her fifth studio album 1989 after her birth year to signify an artistic reinvention and described it as her first "official pop album". On 1989, Swift worked with new producers including Jack Antonoff, who had previously collaborated with her on the One Chance soundtrack song "Sweeter than Fiction" (2013). He produced two tracks for the album's standard edition: "Out of the Woods" and "I Wish You Would".

For "I Wish You Would", the song started with Antonoff experimenting and sampling the snare drums on Fine Young Cannibals' 1988 single "She Drives Me Crazy". He played the sample to Swift on an iPhone and sent it to her after she heard it. Swift then recorded her vocals while on tour and sent the track back to Antonoff, and the two created the song with the vision of "a sort of John Hughes movie visual with pining". "I Wish You Would" was recorded by Antonoff at Lamby's House Studios in Brooklyn, New York, and by Sam Holland at Conway Recording Studios in Los Angeles, California. Max Martin handled the vocal production at MXM Productions. The track was mixed by Serban Ghenea at Mixstar Studios in Virginia Beach, Virginia, and mastered by Tom Coyne at Sterling Sound in Edgewater, New Jersey.

== Music and lyrics ==
"I Wish You Would"
"I Wish You Would" is a bubblegum song instrumented by a guitar lick and snare drums sampled from Fine Young Cannibals' 1989 track "She Drives Me Crazy".

"I Wish You Would" is a synth-pop and bubblegum song. It incorporates a staccato disco guitar lick, dense synths, and loud snares. The synths and snares build up to a climax consisting of eruptive drums and layered vocals in the refrains. Sam Lansky of Time described the production elements as "surging drums and a jagged bassline", while Mark Savage of the BBC characterized the guitar as "choppy, unrelenting". The Atlantic's Spencer Kornhaber said that in the song, Swift sings in an "uneven cadence over fidgety guitars".

Critics compared the song's production to the music of other artists; Matthew Horton of NME said that the "boxy beats and thick synths" evoke the style of Fine Young Cannibals' album The Raw & the Cooked (1989), Mikael Wood of the Los Angeles Times linked the "digital snare cracks" to Go West's song "King of Wishful Thinking" (1990), and some others drew comparisons to Haim. Slant Magazine's Annie Galvin attributed the Haim resemblance to the dynamic build-up, and The A.V. Club's Marah Eakin deemed the production reminiscent of the soundtrack to Mannequin Two: On the Move (1991). Simon Collins of The West Australian described the overall sound as "early Madonna", and the guitar motif as being inspired by INXS and U2.

The lyrics of "I Wish You Would" portray longing in a relationship. Swift said that part of the song is told from the perspective of a lovelorn ex-boyfriend who passes his ex-girlfriend's house at night, thinking how she hates him but she is in fact still in love with him. Other parts of the song are told from the girlfriend's perspective, detailing how she too regrets how things ended. The song begins with Swift's character seeing her love interest at 2 a.m. through the window. Throughout the song, the two characters express their feelings, but not to each other. Consequence's Sasha Geffen said that the relationship in question was dramatic to the point it does not need to be. According to Annie Zaleski, the song ends with ambiguity: it is unclear whether the couple reconciles or stays separated. Swift shared on Tumblr that the song was a "sort of sister track" to "Out of the Woods" and "Is It Over Now?" (2023).

== Release ==
"I Wish You Would" was released as the seventh track on 1989 on October 27, 2014, by Big Machine Records. It charted at number 56 on the Canadian Digital Songs Sales chart. The song received a platinum certification by the Australian Recording Industry Association (ARIA) and a silver certification by the British Phonographic Industry (BPI).

After signing a new contract with Republic Records, Swift began re-recording her first six studio albums in November 2020. The decision followed a public 2019 dispute between Swift and the talent manager Scooter Braun, who acquired Big Machine Records, including the masters of Swift's albums that the label had released. By re-recording the albums, Swift would have full ownership of the new masters, enabling her to control the licensing of her songs for commercial use in hopes of substituting the Big Machine–owned masters.

The re-recording of "I Wish You Would", subtitled "Taylor's Version", was released as part of 1989's re-recording, 1989 (Taylor's Version), on October 27, 2023. The re-recorded track reached the Billboard Global 200 (26) and individual charts for the countries of Canada (32) and New Zealand (30). In the United States, "I Wish You Would (Taylor's Version)" debuted and peaked at number 31 on the Billboard Hot 100, where it extended Swift's record for the most top-40 chart entries by a female artist.

== Critical reception ==
In reviews of 1989, Alexis Petridis of The Guardian selected "I Wish You Would" as a "bold" track that features a "nostalgic sound thus far avoided by 80s revivalists", and Matthew Horton of NME wrote that the song "[plunders] the '80s and still [sounds] fresher than Charli XCX". Adam Markovitz of Entertainment Weekly picked "I Wish You Would" as one of the album's two best songs, alongside "Bad Blood". PopMatters's Corey Baesley said that the song exhibits "the nutrients of lush production and Swift's indelible, sing-song choruses", highlighting new musical styles for Swift that "fit her like a cashmere-lined leather glove". In a somewhat lukewarm review, Craig Mathieson of The Sydney Morning Herald thought that the song was a departure from Swift's "classical singer-songwriter approach". By contrast, Sam Wolfson of Vice lauded "I Wish You Would" for staying true to her songwriting by portraying "regret and loneliness, [being] tied up in knots about something that happened weeks ago".

Zaleski wrote that the song has an anthemic production that "could play over the closing credits of an epic movie". Billboard ranked "I Wish You Would" among the best 100 songs by Swift, saying that the track captures "the overall feeling of 1989" by being "pop, ... fun, ... dramatic, ... romantic and yearning". In her 2020 ranking of every track by Swift, Hannah Mylrea of NME ranked "I Wish You Would" 71st out of 161 songs, calling it a "slightly Haim-ish pop juggernaut". Jane Song from Paste listed at number 80 on her ranking and said that Antonoff's contribution on it was "strong". Reviewing the re-recorded song, Shaad D'Souza of Pitchfork regarded it as one of the "immaculate highs" on 1989 (Taylor's Version), describing it as a "tug-of-war between yearning and anthemic", and Slant Magazine's Jonathan Keefe complimented the improved production quality that "packs even greater heft".

On a less positive side, Alex Hopper of American Songwriter said that despite it being a "rhythmic and enticing" song with "retro flavor and driving melody", it is one of the weaker tracks of 1989. Nate Jones from Vulture wrote that the song would have worked better as a track from the band Bleachers.

== Live performances ==
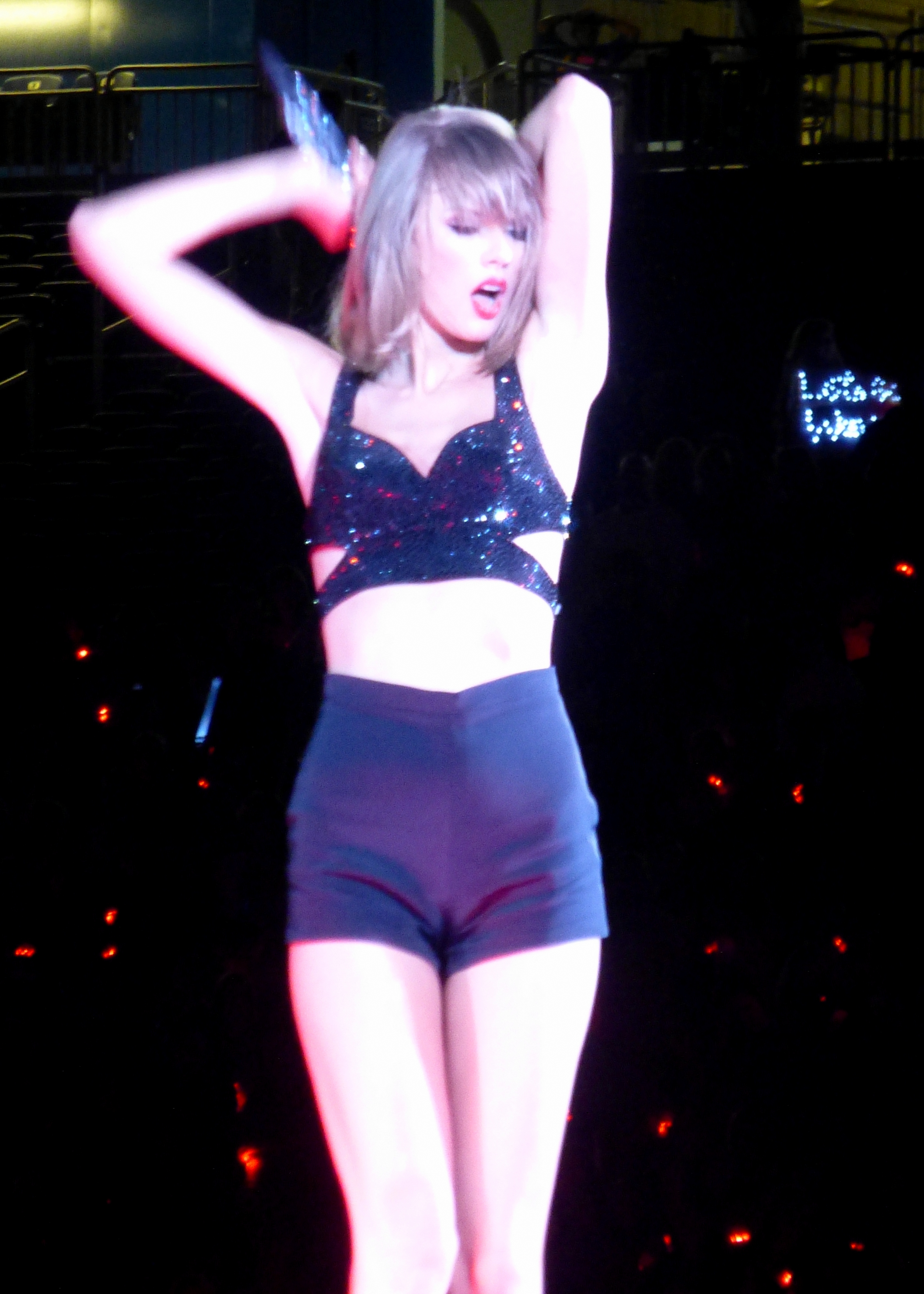
Swift performed "I Wish You Would" on the 1989 World Tour.

In 2015, "I Wish You Would" was included as part of the set list of the 1989 World Tour. She also performed the song during the British Summer Time concert series that year. On June 2, 2024, Swift sang "I Wish You Would" as a "surprise song" at the Chicago stop of her Eras Tour. She performed it again as part of a mashup with "Is It Over Now?" at the tour's Sydney stop on February 25, 2024.

== Personnel ==
"I Wish You Would" (2014)

- Taylor Swift – lead vocals, background vocals, songwriter, producer
- Jack Antonoff – songwriter, producer, electric guitar, bass guitar, acoustic guitar, drums, recording
- Cory Bice – assistant recording engineer
- John Hanes – engineering
- Sam Holland – recording
- Serban Ghenea – mixing
- Greg Kurstin – keyboards, additional producer
- Max Martin – vocal producer

"I Wish You Would (Taylor's Version)" (2023)

Musicians

- Taylor Swift – vocals, background vocals, songwriting
- Jack Antonoff – songwriting, programming, synthesizer, electric guitar; bass guitar, drums
- Mikey Freedom Hart – synthesizer, electric guitar, programming, background vocals
- Evan Smith – synthesizer, programming
- Michael Riddleberger – drums, percussion
- Sean Hutchinson – drums, percussion
- Zem Audu – synthesizer

Technical

- Taylor Swift – production
- Jack Antonoff – production, engineering
- Randy Merrill – mastering
- Ryan Smith – mastering
- Laura Sisk – engineering
- David Hart – engineering
- Evan Smith – engineering
- Michael Riddleberger – engineering
- Mikey Freedom Hart – engineering
- Sean Hutchinson – engineering
- Zem Audu – engineering
- Oli Jacobs – engineering
- Bryce Bordone – mix engineering
- Jack Manning – engineering assistance
- Jon Sher – engineering assistance
- Megan Searl – engineering assistance
- Joey Miller – engineering assistance
- Jozef Caldwell – engineering assistance
- Jacob Spitzer – engineering assistance
- John Turner – engineering assistance

== Charts ==
=== "I Wish You Would" (2014) ===
Chart performance for "I Wish You Would"
Chart (2014)	Peak position
Canada Digital Song Sales (Billboard)	56

=== "I Wish You Would (Taylor's Version)" (2023) ===
Chart performance for "I Wish You Would (Taylor's Version)"
Chart (2023)	Peak position
Canada Hot 100 (Billboard)	32
Global 200 (Billboard)	26
Greece International (IFPI)	53
New Zealand (Recorded Music NZ)	30
Philippines Songs (Billboard)	31
Sweden Heatseeker (Sverigetopplistan)	14
UK Streaming (OCC)	32
US Billboard Hot 100	31

== Certifications ==
Certifications for "I Wish You Would"
Region	Certification	Certified units/sales
Australia (ARIA)	Platinum	70,000^{‡}
New Zealand (RMNZ)	Gold	15,000^{‡}
United Kingdom (BPI)	Silver	200,000^{‡}
^{‡} Sales+streaming figures based on certification alone.

Certifications for "I Wish You Would (Taylor's Version)"
Region	Certification	Certified units/sales
Australia (ARIA)	Gold	35,000^{‡}
^{‡} Sales+streaming figures based on certification alone.
