= This Love (Taylor Swift song) =

2014 song by Taylor Swift

Song by Taylor Swift

from the album 1989
- Written: October 17, 2012
- Released: October 27, 2014
- Studio: Pain in the Art (Nashville)
- Genre: Soft rock; synth-pop
- Length: 4:10
- Label: Big Machine
- Songwriter: Taylor Swift
- Producers: Taylor Swift; Nathan Chapman

Audio video
- "This Love" on YouTube

"This Love" is a song by the American singer-songwriter Taylor Swift. Originally conceived as a poem, it was the first track that she wrote for her fifth studio album, 1989 (2014). Swift and Nathan Chapman produced "This Love", an atmospheric ballad that combines soft rock and synth-pop. The lyrics depict the revival of a faded romance through ocean imagery.

After 1989 was released, the track charted on the Canadian Hot 100 at number 84 and the US Bubbling Under Hot 100 Singles at number 19. It was certified platinum by the Recording Industry Association of America (RIAA) for one million track-equivalent units. In reviews of 1989, some music critics labeled the song as a highlight of 1989, but others deemed its balladic production out of place for the album's upbeat sound.

The re-recording of the song, titled "This Love (Taylor's Version)", was released on May 6, 2022, via Republic Records. It featured on the trailers for the Amazon Prime Video television series The Summer I Turned Pretty. "This Love (Taylor's Version)" features an enhanced production quality, exuding indie rock tendencies. The song is included as part of 1989 (Taylor's Version), which was released on October 27, 2023, and is part of Swift's plan to re-record her back catalog, following the dispute over the ownership of the masters of her first six albums.

== Background and writing ==
Taylor Swift, an American singer-songwriter, had been known as a country artist prior to the release of her fourth studio album, Red (2012). Many of the album's tracks incorporate predominantly pop or rock musical styles, a result of Swift's desire to experiment with the genres. This prompted a media debate over the validity of her status as a country artist. For her next album, 1989, Swift decided to create a "blatant pop" record and move away from the signature country styles of her previous releases. She began writing songs for the album in mid-2013.

"This Love" was the first song that Swift wrote for 1989, and the only one that she wrote on her own. According to 1989's liner notes, she did so on October 17, 2012, when she was in Los Angeles. Swift initially envisioned "This Love" as a "fun, little short poem" for her personal journal; when she came up with a melody in her head, she opted to turn the poem into a song. To this end, she enlisted the help of her long-time collaborator Nathan Chapman, who worked with Swift on all her previous albums, to produce the track with her. "This Love" was the only song from 1989 produced by Chapman. The track was recorded at his Pain in the Art Studio in Nashville, Tennessee, and mixed by Serban Ghenea at MixStar Studios in Virginia Beach, Virginia.

== Release and live performances ==
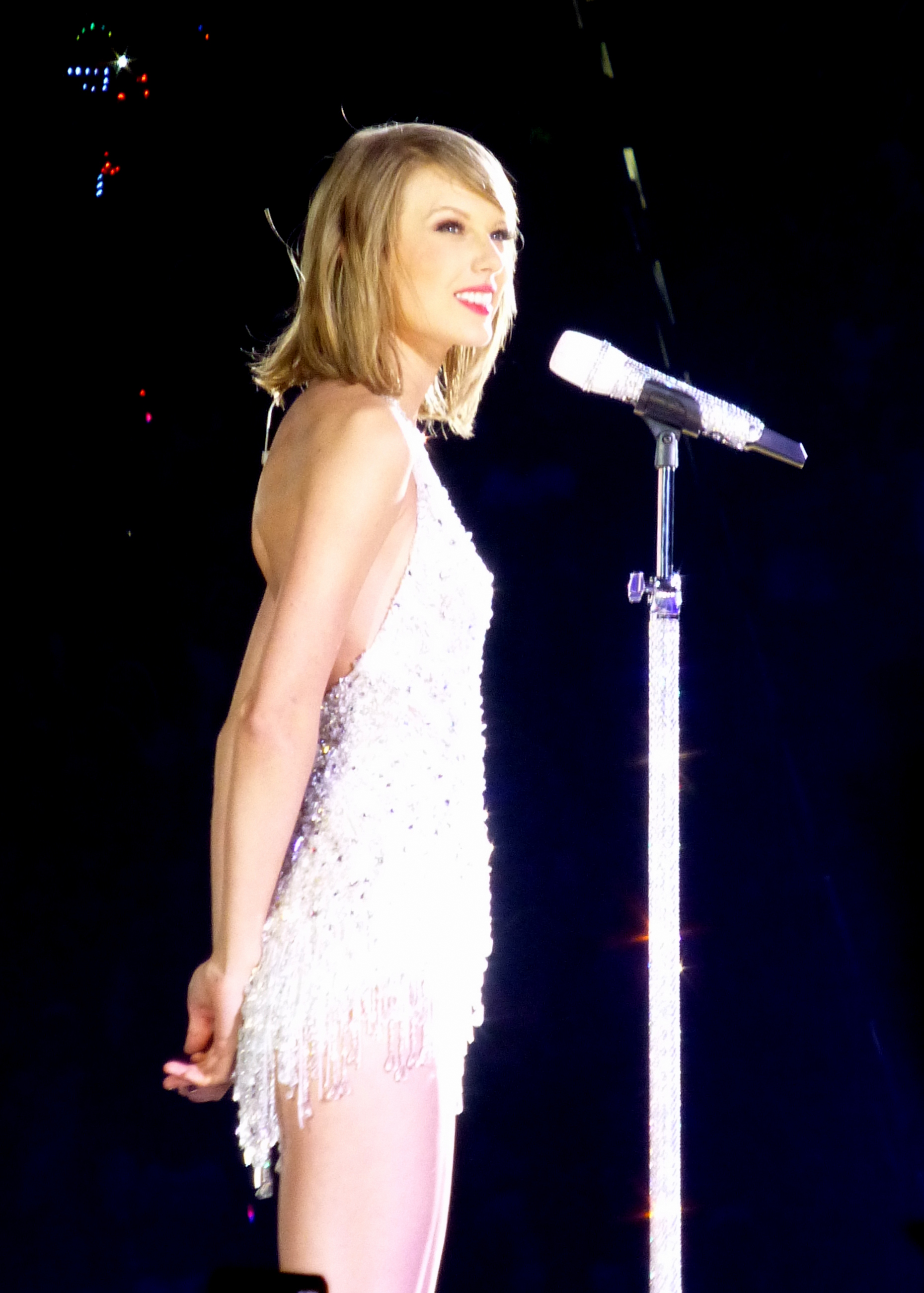
Swift performing on the 1989 World Tour in 2015

1989 was released on October 27, 2014, by Big Machine Records; "This Love" places at number 11 on the album's track list. "This Love" peaked at number 84 on the Canadian Hot 100 chart dated November 15, 2014. In the United States, it peaked at number 19 on the Billboard Bubbling Under Hot 100 chart. The track was certified platinum by the Recording Industry Association of America (RIAA), which denotes one million units consisting of sales and on-demand streaming.

After 1989's release, Swift included the song on the regular set list for the album's associated world tour, which began on May 5, 2015. The track appeared as background music for a Victoria's Secret holiday advertisement that premiered in December 2015. Swift performed a stripped-down, acoustic version of "This Love" as a "surprise song" on the first Atlanta show of her Reputation Stadium Tour, in 2018. On May 13, 2023, she sang the song at the second concert in Philadelphia of her Eras Tour. Swift performed "This Love" on the tour again in 2024 as part of mashups with her songs "Call It What You Want" (2017) at the third Singapore concert on March 4, "Ours" (2011) at the second Dublin concert on June 29, and "The Prophecy" at the second Indianapolis concert on November 2.

== Music and lyrics ==
"This Love" is a midtempo atmospheric ballad. It has a duration of around four minutes and is one of the slowest tracks on the album. The song is primarily rooted in soft rock and synth-pop. Time's Sam Lansky described it as an "electro-ballad". "This Love" consists of both acoustic and electronic instruments with a slow-burning and melodramatic production. It uses double tracking on Swift's vocals. Rob Sheffield, a critic for Rolling Stone, compared the track's sound to that of 1980s power ballads, specifically citing Bon Jovi's "I'll Be There for You" (1989).

The lyrics are about feelings of heartbreak: "Lantern, burning, flickered in my mind for only you / But you were still gone, gone, gone." Swift uses the ocean as a metaphor for a love that disappears and then comes back like the tides. Critics considered it one of 1989's saddest songs. Time magazine's Sam Lansky argued that the chorus's catchiness made it more hopeful than anguished. Swift remarked that she frequently listened to "This Love", citing it as one of her favorites on the album.

== Critical reception ==
Rob Sheffield of Rolling Stone selected "This Love" as one of the three best tracks on 1989, the other two being "How You Get the Girl" and "Clean". In an album review for musicOMH, critic Shane Kimberline lauded it as 1989's best song, emphasizing the chorus and "classic Swiftian" lyrics. Jon Caramanica of The New York Times thought that Swift's songwriting in "This Love" was less detail-oriented compared to her past work; Mikael Wood from the Los Angeles Times took issue with the generic lyrics. Marah Eakin from The A.V. Club considered "This Love" as one of 1989's weaker songs because of its midtempo balladry compared to the album's upbeat production, and Corey Beasley from PopMatters found the atmospheric balladry out of place for the album's overall sound.

== Personnel ==
Credits are adapted from 1989 album liner notes.

- Taylor Swift – vocals, background vocals, songwriter, producer, acoustic guitar
- Nathan Chapman – producer, recording engineer, bass, drums, electric guitar, keyboard
- Jason Campbell – miscellaneous support
- John Hanes – engineer
- Serban Ghenea – mixing

== Charts ==
2014 weekly chart performance for "This Love"
Chart (2014)	Peak position
Canada Hot 100 (Billboard)	84
US Bubbling Under Hot 100 (Billboard)	19

2022–2023 weekly chart performance for "This Love"
Chart (2022–2023)	Peak position
Portugal (AFP)	103

== Certifications ==
Certification for "This Love"
Region	Certification	Certified units/sales
Australia (ARIA)	Gold	35,000^{‡}
United States (RIAA)	Platinum	1,000,000^{‡}
^{‡} Sales+streaming figures based on certification alone.

== "This Love (Taylor's Version)" ==
"This Love (Taylor's Version)"

Promotional single by Taylor Swift

from the album 1989 (Taylor's Version)
- B-side: "Wildest Dreams (Taylor's Version)"
- Released: May 6, 2022
- Studio: Blackbird Studio (Nashville, TN); Prime Recording (Nashville, TN); Kitty Committee Studios (Belfast, Northern Ireland)
- Genre: Soft rock; synth-pop
- Length: 4:10
- Label: Republic
- Songwriter: Taylor Swift
- Producers: Taylor Swift; Christopher Rowe

Lyric video
- "This Love (Taylor's Version)" on YouTube

A re-recorded version of "This Love", titled "This Love (Taylor's Version)", was released by Swift on May 6, 2022, via Republic Records. The song is part of Swift's re-recording plan following the dispute over the ownership to her older discography's masters.

=== Background and release ===
Following a dispute with Big Machine Records in 2019 over the rights to the masters of her first six studio albums, including 1989, Swift announced her goal to re-record each of these albums. A snippet of "This Love (Taylor's Version)" was featured in the first trailer for the 2022 Prime Video original series The Summer I Turned Pretty, released on May 5, 2022. The song was released on digital platforms on May 6. Along with a digital single for "This Love (Taylor's Version)", Swift also released The Old Taylor Collection, merchandise themed to both 1989 and Swift's 2010 album Speak Now. The re-recorded track is included as part of 1989 (Taylor's Version), which was released on October 27, 2023.

=== Composition and reception ===
Compared to the original version, "This Love (Taylor's Version)" features strong elements of indie rock, which critics noted as a possible influence of Swift's 2020 indie rock-indebted albums Folklore and Evermore. Much of the production remains the same, but the synthesizers are more subdued, and Swift's vocals are less processed, more amplified and resonant. Mary Siroky of Consequence highlighted the track as a testament to Swift's songwriting ability to "capture the magic, devastation, and fantasy of romance".

=== Track listing ===
Digital download and streaming

1. "This Love (Taylor's Version)" – 4:10
2. "Wildest Dreams (Taylor's Version)" – 3:40

=== Credits and personnel ===
Credits are adapted from Tidal.

- Taylor Swift – lead vocals, background vocals, songwriting, production
- Christopher Rowe – production, vocal engineering
- Matt Billingslea – drums
- Max Bernstein – synthesizer
- Amos Heller – bass
- Mike Meadows – acoustic guitar
- Paul Sidoti – electric guitar
- Derek Garten – editing, engineering
- Bryce Bordon – engineering
- David Payne – record engineering
- Lowell Reynolds – editing, assistant recording engineering
- Dan Burns – assistant engineering
- Serban Ghenea – mixing
- Randy Merrill – master engineering

=== Charts ===
Chart performance for "This Love (Taylor's Version)"
Chart (2022–2023)	Peak position
Australia (ARIA)	23
Canada Hot 100 (Billboard)	30
Global 200 (Billboard)	35
Greece International (IFPI)	85
Hungary (Single Top 40)	36
Ireland (IRMA)	26
Malaysia (RIM)	5
New Zealand (Recorded Music NZ)	40
Philippines (Billboard)	13
Singapore (RIAS)	17
UK Singles (Official Charts)	42
US Billboard Hot 100	42
Vietnam (Vietnam Hot 100)	23

=== Certifications ===
Certifications for "This Love (Taylor's Version)"
Region	Certification	Certified units/sales
Australia (ARIA)	Platinum	70,000^{‡}
Brazil (Pro-Música Brasil)	Gold	20,000^{‡}
New Zealand (RMNZ)	Gold	15,000^{‡}
United Kingdom (BPI)	Silver	200,000^{‡}
^{‡} Sales+streaming figures based on certification alone.

== Release history ==
Release dates and formats for "This Love"
Region	Date	Format	Version	Label	Ref.
Various	May 6, 2022	Digital download; streaming	Taylor's Version	Republic	
