= 1989 (Taylor's Version) =

2023 re-recorded album by Taylor Swift

- Standard edition cover (Note: Since May 29, 2026, on the digital covers, the seagulls in the background were replaced by clouds. Physical copies remained unchanged.)

Studio album (re-recorded) by Taylor Swift
- Released: October 27, 2023
- Studios: Conway Recording (Los Angeles); Electric Lady (New York City); The Hideaway (London); Mandarin Oriental (Milan); Prime Recording (Nashville); Rough Costumer (Brooklyn); Sharp Sonics (Los Angeles)
- Genre: Synth-pop
- Length: 77:49
- Label: Republic
- Producers: Taylor Swift; Christopher Rowe; Jack Antonoff; Ryan Tedder; Noel Zancanella; Imogen Heap; Shellback; Patrik Berger

Taylor Swift chronology
Speak Now (Taylor's Version) (2023)	1989 (Taylor's Version) (2023)	The Tortured Poets Department (2024)

Singles from 1989 (Taylor's Version)
- 1. "'Slut!'" Released: October 27, 2023; 2. "Is It Over Now?" Released: October 31, 2023

1989 (Taylor's Version) is the fourth re-recorded album by the American singer-songwriter Taylor Swift. It was released on October 27, 2023, through Republic Records, as part of Swift's re-recording project following the 2019 dispute over the master recordings of her back catalog.

A re-recording of Swift's fifth album, 1989 (2014), 1989 (Taylor's Version) consists of re-recorded versions of the 16 songs from 1989's deluxe edition and five previously unreleased "From the Vault" tracks; (Note: This article refers to these tracks as "vault tracks" for concision.) extended editions additionally feature the re-recorded versions of the One Chance soundtrack song "Sweeter than Fiction" (2013) and the Kendrick Lamar remix of "Bad Blood" (2015). Swift, Jack Antonoff, and Christopher Rowe produced the majority of the album; Ryan Tedder, Noel Zancanella, Shellback, and Imogen Heap reprised their production roles. A 1980s-inspired synth-pop album, 1989 (Taylor's Version) is characterized by upbeat arrangements of synthesizers and percussion.

Music critics praised 1989 (Taylor's Version), with emphasis on the production, Swift's vocals, and the vault tracks. The album topped record charts in Australia, Canada, and European territories including France, Germany, Italy, Spain, and the United Kingdom. In the United States, 1989 (Taylor's Version) marked Swift's 13th number-one album on the Billboard 200 and record-extending sixth album to sell over one million first-week copies. Seven of its songs concurrently became top-10 entries on the Billboard Hot 100, with the vault tracks "Is It Over Now?", "Now That We Don't Talk", and "'Slut!'" occupying the top three spots. In 2024, Apple Music placed the album at number 18 on its list of the 100 Best Albums.

== Background ==
Taylor Swift released her fifth album, 1989, on October 27, 2014, under Big Machine Records. Inspired by 1980s synth-pop, Swift conceived 1989 to recalibrate her artistry to pop after promoting her first four albums to country radio. The album received generally positive critical reviews and sold over 10 million copies worldwide. Three of its singles—"Shake It Off", "Blank Space", and "Bad Blood"—reached number one on the Billboard Hot 100. At the 58th Annual Grammy Awards, 1989 made Swift the first female musician to win the Grammy Award for Album of the Year twice—her first win was for Fearless in 2010.

Swift's contract with Big Machine expired in November 2018. She then withdrew from Big Machine and signed a new deal with Republic Records, which secured her the rights to own the masters of any new music she would release. In 2019, the American music executive Scooter Braun acquired Big Machine; the ownership of the masters to Swift's first six albums, including 1989, was transferred to him. In August 2019, Swift spoke against Braun's purchase and announced that she would re-record her first six albums so as to own their masters herself. Swift began the re-recording process in November 2020. Fearless (Taylor's Version), the first of her six re-recorded albums, was released on April 9, 2021, followed by Red (Taylor's Version) on November 12, 2021, and Speak Now (Taylor's Version) on July 7, 2023; all three peaked atop the US Billboard 200 chart.

Swift released re-recordings of some 1989 tracks prior to the re-recorded album; all songs feature the additional "Taylor's Version" moniker in their titles. The re-recording of "Wildest Dreams" was released on September 17, 2021, after the original version went viral on TikTok. Other tracks were used in films and series: "This Love" was released on May 6, 2022, after its snippet featured in the trailer for the series The Summer I Turned Pretty; a snippet of "Bad Blood" appeared in the animated film DC League of Super-Pets, and "Out of the Woods" featured in a trailer for Migration. On August 9, 2023, at the final Los Angeles show at SoFi Stadium as part of Swift's Eras Tour, she performed in five new blue outfits, representing the color that Swift's fans associated 1989 with; during the half-show acoustic set, she announced 1989 (Taylor's Version) as her next re-recorded album, set for release on October 27, 2023, exactly nine years after the original release of 1989.

== Writing and recording ==
The standard edition of 1989 (Taylor's Version) comprises 21 tracks: re-recordings of the 13 songs from the standard edition of 1989, as well as the three bonus tracks from the original deluxe edition, and five previously unreleased "From the Vault" songs that were written for the 2014 album but excluded from the final track list. Re-recordings of the "Bad Blood" remix (2015) featuring the American rapper Kendrick Lamar and "Sweeter than Fiction" (2013), a song Swift and Jack Antonoff contributed to the soundtrack of One Chance (2013), were included on extended editions of 1989 (Taylor's Version) as bonus tracks.

Most re-recorded tracks were produced by Swift and Christopher Rowe. The remaining were co-produced by their original producers—Antonoff, Ryan Tedder, Noel Zancanella, and Imogen Heap. Shellback, who produced multiple songs on 1989 alongside Max Martin, only produced "Wildest Dreams (Taylor's Version)" with Swift and Rowe, while Martin was not involved in the production of the re-recording. All of the vault tracks were written and produced by Swift and Antonoff, except "Say Don't Go", which was co-written by the American songwriter Diane Warren. According to Antonnoff, he could not recall some original sounds that he created, so he asked for help from his Bleachers bandmates for certain sounds like the "soft synths".

== Music and lyrics ==
=== Composition ===
1989 (Taylor's Version) is a synth-pop album, with a production composed of upbeat synthesizers and dynamic percussions. According to NME, the album has a 1980s-inspired synth-pop sound, but is "an evolution of Swift's own sound" rather than a "kitschy pastiche" of retro influences. Various critics have opined that the only sonic difference between 1989 and 1989 (Taylor's Version) is Swift's vocals, which have become technically stronger and richer. (Note: Attributed to The Independent's Adam White, The Line of Best Fit's Kelsey Barnes, The Guardian's Rachel Aroesti, and The Daily Telegraph's Neil McCormick) According to Clash's Alex Berry, the re-recording has a "cleaner" instrumentation. Slant Magazine's Jonathan Keefe identified minor changes: the clicking pen noise on "Blank Space" sounds less like the spring action of a ballpoint pen, the "ah-ah-ah" vocal hook of "New Romantics" is more staccato, the reverb on "Out of the Woods" is more prominent, and the guitar's tone on "Style" is altered.

=== "From the Vault" songs ===
As with the original album, the vault tracks incorporate production elements that evoke the 1980s-inspired pop sound: reverb, synths, keyboards, and percussions. (Note: Attributed to Aroesti, Clash's Alex Berry, American Songwriter's Alex Hopper, and Billboard's Jason Lipshutz) AllMusic's Fred Thomas wrote that the production was reminiscent of late-1980s radio, and The Line of Best Fit's Kelsey Barnes opined that the vault tracks featured different pop subgenres. Variety's Chris Willman and Pitchfork's Shaad D'Souza opined that their production elements were influenced by the music of Swift's tenth studio album, Midnights (2022).

The title of "'Slut!'" refers to the slut-shaming Swift experienced as a public figure, a result of the media scrutiny on her personal life and serial romantic relationships. In its lyrics, Swift describes a relationship that she is proud of and does not care how the outside world views it. It is a mid-tempo synth-pop song, featuring layered, grainy analog synthesizers and soft backing vocals. "Say Don't Go" is about Swift hanging on to an unfruitful relationship; it has a reverb-heavy, pop rock production that consists of isolated vocal patterns, gated snare drums, synthesized Moog bass and guitar, and layered keyboard sounds created with a Mellotron and analog synths: Oberheim OB-Xa, Yamaha DX100, Juno-6, and Korg M1.

"Is It Over Now?"
A reverb-heavy power ballad, "Is It Over Now?" features dense synths and echoing drum machines.

The disco track "Now That We Don't Talk" incorporates disco grooves and falsetto vocals in the chorus, and its lyrics see Swift moving on from an ex-lover while making fun of his lifestyle and tastes. "Suburban Legends" depicts Swift yearning for a hopeful but unfruitful romance. It features an insistent disco groove instrumented by layers of synth arpeggiators, a mix of acoustic and programmed drums, and an outro of dissipating synths. "Is It Over Now?" chronicles the end of a relationship, with lyrics about mistakes committed by both partners and the mixed feelings that ensued. A synthwave-influenced synth-pop power ballad, it begins with a vocal hook that resembles sounds of a seagull, created with a Moog model D and a Juno 6, over atmospheric layers of synths and bass. The track progresses with a reverb-heavy soundscape composed of synths and echoing drum machines.

== Release ==
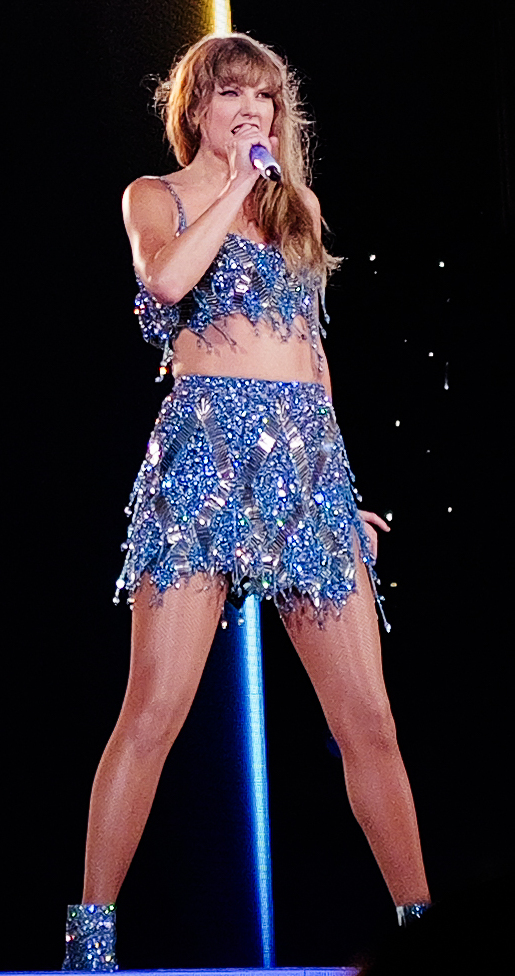
Swift announced the album at the Eras Tour concert at the SoFi Stadium on August 9, 2023.

On September 19, 2023, Swift posted a short visual on social media that depicted the characters "T-S-!-U-L" emerging from a blue vault, which fans and journalists considered to be a teaser for one of the five "From the Vault" tracks. She also partnered with Google Search to launch a feature for solving word puzzles to uncover the album's "From the Vault" track titles. Searching for "Taylor Swift" gave rise to an animated graphic of a blue vault, which, upon being clicked, produced one of 89 puzzles with or without an accompanying hint. The track titles were set to be officially revealed once 33 million puzzles had been solved globally. Although the feature crashed hours after launching, it reached the 33-million mark in less than one day. Four of the five vault track titles were revealed: "Is It Over Now?", "Now That We Don't Talk", "Say Don't Go", and "Suburban Legends". Swift unveiled the back covers of the album, which featured the full track list, confirming "'Slut!'" as the remaining vault track.

Republic Records released 1989 (Taylor's Version) on October 27, 2023, as Swift's fourth re-recorded album. The album was made available for streaming, download, vinyl LP, cassette, and CD. The standard edition contains 21 tracks—16 are re-recorded versions of the tracks on the original album and five are vault tracks. A deluxe edition containing the re-recorded remix of "Bad Blood" featuring Lamar was released on streaming and digital download platforms hours after the standard album. The album was sold in 14 physical variants, including five vinyl editions (one of which, the Tangerine Edition, being a Target exclusive containing the re-recording of "Sweeter than Fiction"), eight CD editions (each with folded posters or photographs), and a multi-colored cassette. (Note: The physical editions, which do not include the re-recorded "Bad Blood" remix featuring Kendrick Lamar, are subtitled "Crystal Skies Blue", "Rose Garden Pink", "Aquamarine Green", and "Sunrise Boulevard Yellow". The Target-exclusive LP is subtitled "Tangerine Edition".) The standard cover is a photograph of Swift in red lipstick with a background of a blue sky and seagulls flying in the distance. Exclaim! listed the album cover as the 15th worst of the year, saying that Swift "could afford to hire a professional graphic designer" to design the cover, and that the cover looks like a fan design on Canva. Universal Music released "'Slut!'" to Italian radio on October 27, and Republic Records released "Is It Over Now?" as a single to US contemporary hit radio on October 31.

== Critical reception ==
Professional ratings
Aggregate scores
Source	Rating
AnyDecentMusic?	8.1/10
Metacritic	90/100
Review scores
Source	Rating
AllMusic	5/5 stars
Clash	9/10
The Daily Telegraph	5/5 stars
The Guardian	5/5 stars
The Independent	3/5 stars
NME	5/5 stars
Paste	9/10
Pitchfork	7.7/10
Rolling Stone	5/5 stars
The Times	5/5 stars

1989 (Taylor's Version) was met with widespread acclaim from critics. On the review aggregator Metacritic, it received a weighted mean score of 90 out of 100 based on 15 reviews, indicating "universal acclaim". The review aggregator site AnyDecentMusic? compiled 14 reviews and gave the album an 8.1 out of 10.

Most critics appreciated the production for remaining faithful to the original. NME's Hollie Geraghty, The Daily Telegraph's Neil McCormick, and Ludovic Hunter-Tilney of Financial Times regarded 1989 (Taylor's Version) as Swift's best record; the lattermost said that the album showcased "the highly engineered setting of the perfect pop song". Will Hodgkinson of The Times dubbed the album a "pop masterclass", and Ed Power of the i described it as "bright, brash, smart and catchy". Rolling Stone's Angie Martoccio, American Songwriter's Alex Hopper, and Pitchfork's Shaad D'Souza opined that the re-recorded album proved the timeless quality of the original. Mark Sutherland from Rolling Stone UK said 1989 (Taylor's Version) "could well be the greatest pop album of 2023".

Critics were also fond of Swift's vocals. Barnes said they were "more powerful and punchy than ever", and The Guardian's Rachel Aroesti described them as "richer and more mature yet hardly distractingly so". Berry admired how Swift sang with "crystal clear pronunciation and a powerful impact". Keefe and Hopper said her matured vocals made the tracks more impactful and resonant. By contrast, Adam White of The Independent wrote that Swift's improved vocals, losing 2014's raw "strain," made the re-recording a "diminished" pop classic. However, White added that the album was still "untouchable greatness".

The vault tracks were similarly well received. Aroesti, Martoccio, Power, and Hopper regarded them as worthwhile additions with more depth and a showcase of Swift's songwriting talents. Berry admired the "exquisite" vault tracks that showcased strong writing and production. Paste's Elizabeth Braaten proclaimed that the vault tracks made 1989 (Taylor's Version) Swift's best re-recorded album yet, and Thomas said they consolidated Swift's status as a "timeless songwriter". Keefe was less enthusiastic, saying that the vault tracks were solid but not valuable "as a true thematic and aesthetic extension". D'Souza wrote that they lacked "the wallop and precision of the album proper" but added more depth and context.

There were also discussions relating to technical and mastering issues on the album, specifically audio artifacts and high frequency buzzing on some of the songs. Some professionals noted "The noise, it seems, is somewhere in the neighborhood of 15,000Hz." Others described it as audible "buzzing/electrical noise..., mostly on vocals but not always just vocals. It's at 15.7kHz and it represented by a line on a spectrogram."

== Commercial performance ==
On Spotify, 1989 (Taylor's Version) registered the highest single-day streams globally for an album in 2023, with 176 million reported streams. Swift also broke her own record for the most single-day Spotify streams for an artist. The album also broke the records for the most single-day and single-week streams on Amazon Music. Republic Records reported global opening-week sales of over 3.5 million units, making it the third best selling female album in its debut week ever. In terms of pure sales, the album sold 2.8 million copies worldwide in 2023, becoming the year's sixth-best-selling album overall and best-selling album by a solo artist. It was also the best-selling vinyl album of 2023 with 1.4 million copies sold. Its songs occupied the top six of the Billboard Global 200 the same week, making Swift the first artist to achieve this feat.

In the United States, 1989 (Taylor's Version) became Swift's record-extending 11th album to sell 500,000 copies and sixth to sell one million copies in a single week. The album debuted atop the Billboard 200 with 1.653 million units (including 1.359 million pure sales), surpassing the original 1989's figure by 400,000 units. It marked Swift's 13th chart-topper. The album topped the Billboard 200 for six non-consecutive weeks; its fifth week at number one helped Swift accumulate 68 weeks in total atop the Billboard 200, surpassing Elvis Presley's record for the most number-one weeks for a soloist. As of January 2024, it had reached two million in pure sales. 1989 (Taylor's Version) was the first album to sell over one million copies on vinyl in a single calendar year since Luminate began tracking US music sales in 1991. All 21 tracks on the standard edition of the re-recording charted on the Billboard Hot 100, with "Is It Over Now?", "Now That We Don't Talk", and "'Slut!'" in the top three. This marked the fifth time Swift had both a song and an album debut atop the Billboard 200 and Hot 100 simultaneously, extending an all-time record.

1989 (Taylor's Version) also reached number one on the album charts of many European territories, including Austria, Belgium (both Flanders and Wallonia), Denmark, France, Germany, Italy, the Netherlands, Portugal, Spain, and Sweden. In Germany, 1989 (Taylor's Version) helped Swift become the artist with the most vinyl records sold of 2023. In the United Kingdom, it earned 148,000 units within three days to claim the biggest opening sales week of the year. It debuted at number one on the UK Albums Chart with 184,000 units, more than doubling the opening of its 2014 counterpart, and became Swift's 11th number one. It sold 62,000 vinyl LPs in its first week, becoming the fastest-selling vinyl album of 2023. The album stayed at the top for three consecutive weeks, becoming 2023's longest-running number-one album, and was the most purchased physical album of 2023, with sales of 185,000 units. In Australia, 1989 (Taylor's Version) debuted atop the ARIA Albums Chart as Swift's 12th number-one album. It marked a career-best opening week for Swift and possibly the largest vinyl sales week in Australian chart history. (Note: The ARIA Charts began in 1988, at which time vinyl album sales had been largely replaced by CD and cassette sales.) The album spent fourteen non-consecutive weeks at number one, was the longest-running number-one album of 2023, and had eight of its songs debut simultaneously at the top 10 of the ARIA Singles Chart, completely occupying the top four. Seven tracks from the album debuted on the Billboard Brasil Hot 100.

== Accolades ==
1989 (Taylor's Version) was nominated for International Album of the Year at the Gaffa Awards in Denmark and the Juno Awards in Canada. It was also nominated for Top Billboard 200 Album at the 2024 Billboard Music Awards. In 2024, the album was placed at number 18 on Apple Music's list of the 100 Best Albums.

== Track listing ==
Standard edition
No.	Title	Writer(s)	Producer(s)	Length
1.	"Welcome to New York"	Taylor Swift; Ryan Tedder	Swift; Tedder; Noel Zancanella	3:32
2.	"Blank Space"	Swift; Max Martin; Shellback	Swift; Christopher Rowe	3:51
3.	"Style"	Swift; Martin; Shellback; Ali Payami	Swift; Rowe	3:51
4.	"Out of the Woods"	Swift; Jack Antonoff	Swift; Antonoff	3:55
5.	"All You Had to Do Was Stay"	Swift; Martin	Swift; Rowe	3:13
6.	"Shake It Off"	Swift; Martin; Shellback	Swift; Rowe	3:39
7.	"I Wish You Would"	Swift; Antonoff	Swift; Antonoff	3:27
8.	"Bad Blood"	Swift; Martin; Shellback	Swift; Rowe	3:31
9.	"Wildest Dreams"	Swift; Martin; Shellback	Swift; Rowe; Shellback	3:40
10.	"How You Get the Girl"	Swift; Martin; Shellback	Swift; Rowe	4:07
11.	"This Love"	Swift	Swift; Rowe	4:10
12.	"I Know Places"	Swift; Tedder	Swift; Tedder; Zancanella	3:15
13.	"Clean"	Swift; Imogen Heap	Swift; Heap	4:31
14.	"Wonderland"	Swift; Martin; Shellback	Swift; Rowe	4:05
15.	"You Are in Love"	Swift; Antonoff	Swift; Antonoff	4:27
16.	"New Romantics"	Swift; Martin; Shellback	Swift; Rowe	3:50
17.	"'Slut!'"	Swift; Antonoff; Patrik Berger	Swift; Antonoff; Berger	3:00
18.	"Say Don't Go"	Swift; Diane Warren	Swift; Antonoff	4:39
19.	"Now That We Don't Talk"	Swift; Antonoff	Swift; Antonoff	2:26
20.	"Suburban Legends"	Swift; Antonoff	Swift; Antonoff	2:51
21.	"Is It Over Now?"	Swift; Antonoff	Swift; Antonoff	3:49
Total length:				77:49

Tangerine LP edition
No.	Title	Writer(s)	Producer(s)	Length
22.	"Sweeter than Fiction"	Swift; Antonoff	Swift; Antonoff	3:54
Total length:				81:43

Digital deluxe edition
No.	Title	Writer(s)	Producer(s)	Length
22.	"Bad Blood" (featuring Kendrick Lamar)	Swift; Lamar; Martin; Shellback	Swift; Rowe	3:20
Total length:				81:09

=== Notes ===
- All tracks are subtitled "Taylor's Version"; tracks 17–21 are additionally subtitled "From the Vault".
- An acoustic version of "'Slut!'" was included in a limited-time digital download edition of the deluxe album.

== Personnel ==
Musicians

- Taylor Swift – vocals (all tracks), background vocals (all tracks), clapping (6), heartbeat (9)
- Ryan Tedder – background vocals, piano, synthesizer (1, 12); acoustic guitar, drum programming, electric guitar, programming (12)
- Noel Zancanella – drum programming, synthesizer (1, 12), bass guitar, programming (12)
- Mike Meadows – synthesizer (2, 3, 5, 6, 8–10, 14, 16, 22), acoustic guitar (2, 3, 5, 8, 10, 11, 14, 16, 22), electric guitar (2, 3, 16), background vocals (6), synthesizer programming (9)
- Amos Heller – bass guitar (2, 3, 5, 6, 9–11, 14, 16), synth bass (22)
- Dan Burns – drum programming, synth bass, synthesizer (2, 3, 5, 8, 10, 14, 16, 22); programming (3), synthesizer programming (9)
- Matt Billingslea – drum programming (2, 3, 5, 8, 10, 14, 16, 22), drums (2, 3, 5, 8–11, 14, 16, 22), percussion (6, 9)
- Max Bernstein – electric guitar (2, 3, 5, 10, 14, 16), synthesizer (2, 3, 6–11, 14, 16, 22), acoustic guitar (3, 14, 16), synthesizer programming (9)
- Derek Garten – programming (2, 3, 5, 6, 8, 10, 14, 16, 22)
- Brian Pruitt – drum programming, drums (2, 5, 10, 14, 16)
- Christopher Rowe – background vocals (2, 6, 8, 22), trumpet (6)
- Jack Antonoff – programming (4, 7, 15, 17–21), synthesizer (4, 7, 15, 17–21), electric guitar (4, 7, 15, 18, 19); bass guitar (4, 7, 15), drums (4, 7, 15); acoustic guitar (4, 18), background vocals (17, 18, 20, 21); Mellotron, percussion (18)
- Mikey Freedom Hart – synthesizer (4, 7, 15, 18–21), electric guitar (4, 7, 15, 18–20), programming (4, 7, 15, 18, 19), acoustic guitar (4, 15), background vocals (7), bass guitar, Rhodes (18, 19), Farfisa (20)
- Evan Smith – synthesizer (4, 7, 15, 18–21), programming (4, 7, 15, 18, 19), background vocals (4), saxophone (18–21), electric guitar (20)
- Michael Riddleberger – drums, percussion (4, 7, 15, 18–21)
- Sean Hutchinson – drums, percussion (4, 7, 15, 18–21); programming (15)
- Zem Audu – synthesizer (4, 7, 15, 18–21)
- Mattias Bylund – synthesizer (6, 9), string arrangement (9)
- Paul Sidoti – electric guitar (6, 10, 11), background vocals (6)
- Wojtek Goral – alto saxophone, baritone saxophone (6)
- Robert Allen – background vocals, clapping (6)
- Tomas Jönsson – baritone saxophone, tenor saxophone (6)
- Johan Schuster – drums, sound effects (6)
- Lowell Reynolds – programming (6)
- Peter Noos Johansson – trombone, tuba (6)
- Janne Bjerger – trumpet (6)
- Magnus Johansson – trumpet (6)
- David Bukovinszky – cello (9)
- Mattias Johansson – violin (9)
- Orion Meshorer – acoustic guitar, electric guitar (12)
- Imogen Heap – background vocals, drums, kalimba, keyboards, percussion, programming, vibraphone (13)
- Patrik Berger – bass guitar, electric guitar, programming, synthesizer (17)
- Ilya Salmanzadeh – background vocals (22)
- Kendrick Lamar – vocals (22)

Technical

- Randy Merrill – mastering
- Ryan Smith – mastering (1–8, 10–22)
- Serban Ghenea – mixing
- Rich Rich – engineering (1, 12)
- Ryan Tedder – engineering (1, 12)
- Derek Garten – engineering, editing (2, 3, 5, 6, 8, 10, 11, 14, 16, 22)
- Christopher Rowe – engineering (4, 7, 15), vocal engineering (1–3, 5, 6, 8–14, 22)
- Laura Sisk – engineering (4, 7, 15, 17–22)
- Jack Antonoff – engineering (4, 7, 15, 17–21)
- David Hart – engineering (4, 7, 15, 18–21)
- Evan Smith – engineering (4, 7, 15, 18–21)
- Michael Riddleberger – engineering (4, 7, 15, 18–21)
- Mikey Freedom Hart – engineering (4, 7, 15, 18–21)
- Sean Hutchinson – engineering (4, 7, 15, 18–21)
- Zem Audu – engineering (4, 7, 15, 18–21)
- Oli Jacobs – engineering (4, 7, 15, 18)
- Lowell Reynolds – engineering (6), editing (6, 11), engineering assistance (11)
- Mattias Bylund – engineering, editing (6, 9)
- David Payne – engineering (11)
- Imogen Heap – engineering (13)
- Ray Charles Brown Jr. – engineering (22)
- Bryce Bordone – mix engineering (1–8, 10, 11, 2)
- John Hanes – mix engineering (9)
- Dan Burns – additional engineering (2, 3, 5, 8, 10, 11, 14, 16, 22)
- Jack Manning – engineering assistance (4, 7, 15, 17–21)
- Jon Sher – engineering assistance (4, 7, 15, 17–21)
- Megan Searl – engineering assistance (4, 7, 15, 17–21)
- Joey Miller – engineering assistance (4, 7, 15)
- Jozef Caldwell – engineering assistance (4, 7, 15)
- Jacob Spitzer – engineering assistance (22)
- John Turner – engineering assistance (22)

== Charts ==
=== Weekly charts ===
Weekly chart performance
Chart (2023)	Peak position
Argentine Albums (CAPIF)	1
Australian Albums (ARIA)	1
Austrian Albums (Ö3 Austria)	1
Belgian Albums (Ultratop Flanders)	1
Belgian Albums (Ultratop Wallonia)	1
Canadian Albums (Billboard)	1
Croatian International Albums (HDU)	1
Czech Albums (ČNS IFPI)	2
Danish Albums (Hitlisten)	1
Dutch Albums (Album Top 100)	1
Finnish Albums (Suomen virallinen lista)	2
French Albums (SNEP)	1
German Albums (Offizielle Top 100)	1
Hungarian Albums (MAHASZ)	2
Icelandic Albums (Tónlistinn)	2
Irish Albums (Official Charts)	1
Italian Albums (FIMI)	1
Japanese Albums (Oricon)	11
Japanese Combined Albums (Oricon)	13
Japanese Hot Albums (Billboard Japan)	12
Lithuanian Albums (AGATA)	2
New Zealand Albums (RMNZ)	1
Norwegian Albums (VG-lista)	1
Polish Albums (ZPAV)	2
Portuguese Albums (AFP)	1
Scottish Albums (Official Charts)	1
Slovak Albums (ČNS IFPI)	2
Spanish Albums (Promusicae)	1
Swedish Albums (Sverigetopplistan)	1
UK Albums (Official Charts)	1
US Billboard 200	1

=== Year-end charts ===
2023 year-end charts
Chart (2023)	Position
Australian Albums (ARIA)	1
Austrian Albums (Ö3 Austria)	4
Belgian Albums (Ultratop Flanders)	7
Belgian Albums (Ultratop Wallonia)	54
Danish Albums (Hitlisten)	71
Dutch Albums (Album Top 100)	7
French Albums (SNEP)	40
German Albums (Offizielle Top 100)	5
Hungarian Albums (MAHASZ)	22
Italian Albums (FIMI)	55
New Zealand Albums (RMNZ)	6
Polish Albums (ZPAV)	77
Portuguese Albums (AFP)	1
Spanish Albums (PROMUSICAE)	8
UK Albums (OC)	3

2024 year-end charts
Chart (2024)	Position
Australian Albums (ARIA)	5
Austrian Albums (Ö3 Austria)	5
Belgian Albums (Ultratop Flanders)	9
Belgian Albums (Ultratop Wallonia)	92
Canadian Albums (Billboard)	4
Croatian International Albums (HDU)	11
Danish Albums (Hitlisten)	60
Dutch Albums (Album Top 100)	30
French Albums (SNEP)	45
German Albums (Offizielle Top 100)	8
Global Albums (IFPI)	14
New Zealand Albums (RMNZ)	8
Polish Albums (ZPAV)	94
Portuguese Albums (AFP)	9
Spanish Albums (PROMUSICAE)	28
UK Albums (OCC)	15
US Billboard 200	2

2025 year-end charts
Chart (2025)	Position
Australian Albums (ARIA)	40
Belgian Albums (Ultratop Flanders)	93
French Albums (SNEP)	130
UK Albums (OC)	79
US Billboard 200	55

== Certifications ==
Certifications
Region	Certification	Certified units/sales
Australia (ARIA)	3× Platinum	210,000^{‡}
Austria (IFPI Austria)	Platinum	15,000^{‡}
Brazil (Pro-Música Brasil)	2× Platinum	80,000^{‡}
Canada (Music Canada)	4× Platinum	320,000^{‡}
Denmark (IFPI Danmark)	Platinum	20,000^{‡}
France (SNEP)	2× Platinum	200,000^{‡}
Germany (BVMI)	Platinum	150,000^{‡}
Italy (FIMI)	Platinum	50,000^{‡}
New Zealand (RMNZ)	3× Platinum	45,000^{‡}
Poland (ZPAV)	Platinum	20,000^{‡}
Portugal (AFP)	Platinum	7,000^{‡}
Spain (Promusicae)	Platinum	40,000^{‡}
United Kingdom (BPI)	2× Platinum	600,000^{‡}
United States (RIAA)	4× Platinum	4,000,000^{‡}
^{‡} Sales+streaming figures based on certification alone.

== Release history ==
Release dates and formats
Initial release date	Edition(s)	Format(s)	Ref.
October 27, 2023	Standard	Digital download; streaming; CD; vinyl LP; cassette	
October 27, 2023	Tangerine	Vinyl LP	
October 27, 2023	Deluxe	Digital download; streaming	
November 9, 2023	Webstore Deluxe	Digital download	

== See also ==
- List of Billboard 200 number-one albums of 2023
- List of Billboard 200 number-one albums of 2024
- List of number-one albums of 2023 (Australia)
- List of number-one albums of 2024 (Australia)
- List of number-one albums of 2023 (Belgium)
- List of number-one albums of 2023 (Canada)
- List of number-one albums of 2023 (Ireland)
- List of number-one albums of 2023 (Portugal)
- List of number-one albums of 2023 (Spain)
- List of number-one albums from the 2020s (New Zealand)
- List of UK Albums Chart number ones of the 2020s
