= Clean (song) =

2014 song by Taylor Swift

Song by Taylor Swift

from the album 1989
- Released: October 27, 2014
- Recorded: February 9, 2014
- Studio: The Hideaway (London)
- Genre: Soft rock; dream pop; synth-folk
- Length: 4:30
- Label: Big Machine
- Songwriters: Taylor Swift; Imogen Heap
- Producers: Taylor Swift; Imogen Heap

Audio video
- "Clean" on YouTube

"Clean (Taylor's Version)"

Song by Taylor Swift

from the album 1989 (Taylor's Version)
- Released: October 27, 2023
- Studio: Kitty Committee Studios (New York, NY); The Hideaway (London)
- Length: 4:31
- Label: Republic
- Songwriters: Taylor Swift; Imogen Heap
- Producers: Taylor Swift; Imogen Heap

Lyric video
- "Clean (Taylor's Version)" on YouTube

"Clean" is a song by the American singer-songwriter Taylor Swift, taken from her fifth studio album, 1989 (2014). Written and produced by Swift and the English musician Imogen Heap, the track is a steady soft rock, dream pop, and synth-folk ballad with an electronic production. Its lyrics depict difficulty in letting go of a broken relationship.

Initial reviews of 1989 praised "Clean" for the lyrical sentiments and Swift's songwriting, and picked it as an album highlight. Retrospective rankings have considered the track one of Swift's best songs. Commercially, "Clean" reached the charts of Canada and Portugal and received certifications from Australia and the United Kingdom. It has been covered by several singers, and was featured on the set list of Swift's 1989 World Tour (2015).

A re-recorded version, titled "Clean (Taylor's Version)", was released as part of 1989 (Taylor's Version) on October 27, 2023. The re-recording peaked at number 25 on the Billboard Global 200 and entered in the top 30 on the national charts of Canada, New Zealand, the Philippines, Singapore, and the United States.

== Background ==
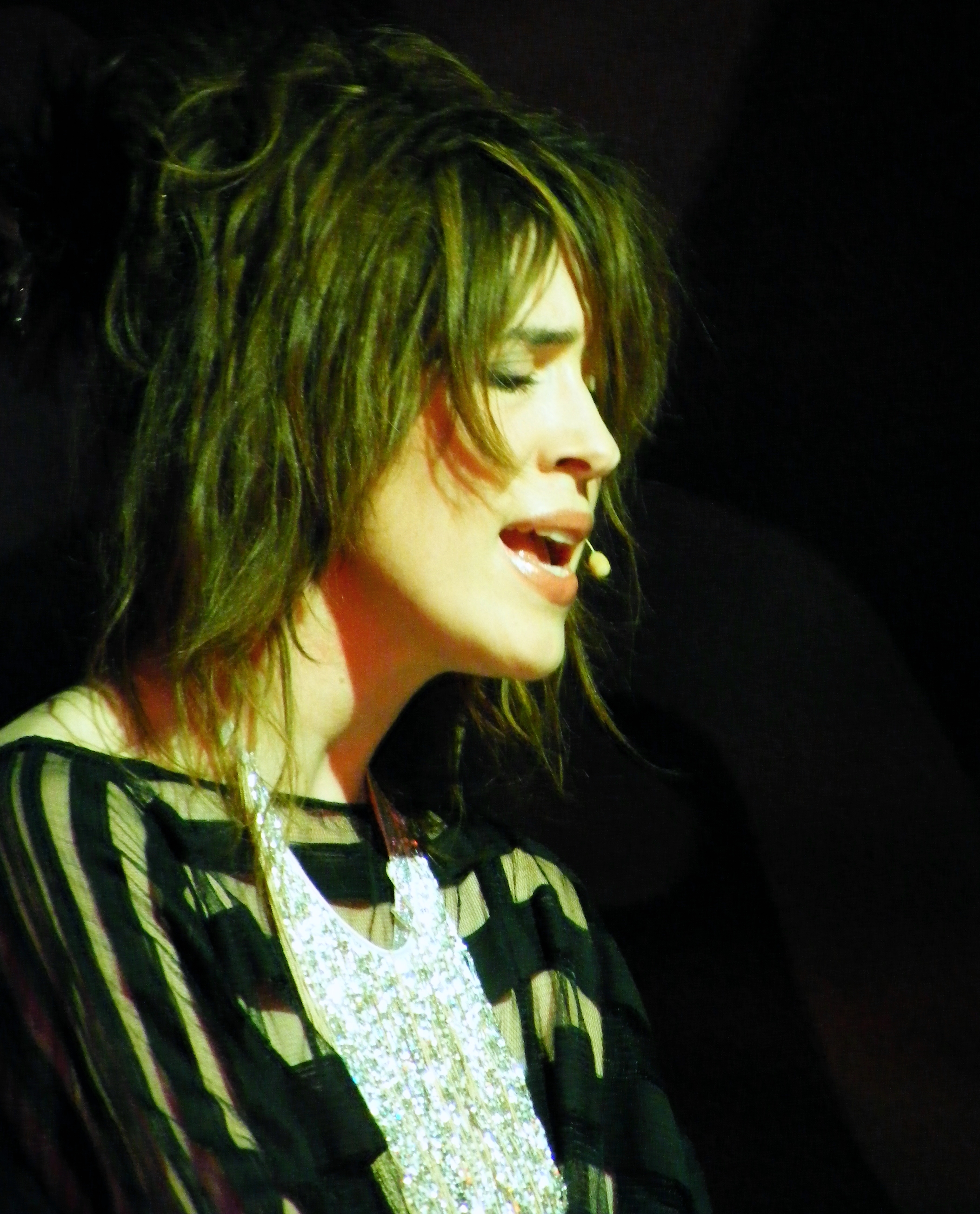
Swift wrote and produced "Clean" with the English musician Imogen Heap (pictured).

The American singer-songwriter Taylor Swift had identified as a country artist until she released her fourth studio album, Red, in October 2012. Although Swift and Big Machine Records promoted Red to country radio, some of its tracks feature styles of pop and rock, a result of Swift's desire to experiment with new styles. This sparked a media debate over her status as a country artist. In mid-2013, she began writing songs for her next studio album.

Swift titled her fifth studio album after her birth year, 1989. She decided to make it her first "official pop" record that would transform her image to a pop artist and move away from the country styles of her previous releases. To this end, Swift recruited new producers including the English musician Imogen Heap, whom she called "one of the most interesting and unique artists". "Clean" was one of the last tracks Swift wrote for 1989; she finished the lyrics and melody before approaching Heap to co-produce it. Swift recalled that she was inspired to write "Clean" after spending two weeks in London: "it hit me that I'd been in the same city as [an ex-lover] for two weeks and I hadn't thought about it."

Heap helped to complete the track by playing instruments, and they finished recording it after two takes in one day at The Hideaway Studio in London. The song was mixed by Serban Ghenea at MixStar Studios in Virginia Beach, Virginia, and was mastered by Tom Coyne at Sterling Sound Studio in New York City. In the third part of the listening session at Grammy Pro in 2015, Swift revealed that for the unique instrumentation of "Clean", Heap combined two of her unique instruments, the mbira, a thumb piano, and "then these things called boomwhackers, which are for the percussion."

== Composition ==
"Clean" is a soft rock, dream pop, and synth-folk ballad. At four minutes and thirty seconds long, the song progresses at a steady tempo. Jem Aswad from Billboard believed that the electronic production was influenced by Heap's musical style. It incorporates piano, keyboard, drums, mbira, vibraphone, bass, layered vocals, and a groove that is built around percussion. The Telegraph author Neil McCormick described "Clean" as "understated" and "atmospheric". Hannah Mylrea from NME said the song has "chiming soft rock instrumentals", while The Guardian's Alex Petridis wrote that it features "alternately pulsing and drifting electronics".

The lyrics use imagery of a torrential storm to describe breaking from an addictive, toxic relationship. At one point, Swift sings of a past relationship, "You're still all over me like a wine-stained dress I can't wear anymore." She continues, "When I was drowning, that's when I could finally breathe / And by morning / Gone was any trace of you / I think I am finally clean." The word clean is a metaphor with two meanings: clean as in the feeling of taking a shower and as in getting free from an addiction.

== Releases ==
1989 was released on October 27, 2014, via Big Machine Records. In the track-list, "Clean" is placed at number 13 as the closing track. The song appeared on the Canadian Digital Song Sales chart upon release, with a peak of number 45. In 2015, Swift included the song on the set list of the 1989 World Tour. Before performing it, she would share lessons she had learned in her personal life with the audience. In 2023, she performed the track as a "surprise song" on two dates of the Eras Tour: April 1 in Arlington, Texas, and May 28 in East Rutherford, New Jersey. In 2024, Swift sang it with a piano as part of a mashup with her songs "Welcome to New York" and "Say Don't Go" at the tour's Stockholm stop on May 18 and with "Is It Over Now?" and "Out of the Woods" at the tour's London stop on June 23. The song also received platinum and silver certifications in 2023 from the Australian Recording Industry Association (ARIA) and the British Phonographic Industry (BPI), respectively.

After signing a new contract with Republic Records, Swift began re-recording her first six studio albums in November 2020. The decision followed a public 2019 dispute between Swift and the talent manager Scooter Braun, who acquired Big Machine Records, including the masters of Swift's albums that the label had released. By re-recording the albums, Swift had full ownership of the new masters, which enabled her to control the licensing of her songs for commercial use and therefore substituted the Big Machine–owned masters. The re-recording of "Clean", subtitled "Taylor's Version", was released as part of 1989's re-recording, 1989 (Taylor's Version), on October 27, 2023. "Clean (Taylor's Version)" is a second longer than the original; Heap reprised her role as co-producer and player of instruments including vibraphone, percussion, kalimba, keyboard, and drums.

The song reached the countries of the Philippines (13), Singapore (26), Canada (28), and New Zealand (28). In the United States, "Clean (Taylor's Version)" was a top-30 entry on the Billboard Hot 100, where it extended Swift's record for the most top-40 chart entries by a female artist. Elsewhere, it appeared on the Billboard Global 200, Sweden's Heatseeker chart, and the United Kingdom's Audio Streaming Chart, with peaks of 25, 17, and 33, respectively. The original version also charted at number 85 on Portugal's AFP Singles Chart following the album's release.

== Critical reception ==
"Clean" received generally positive reviews upon release, with a number of critics choosing it as a highlight from 1989. Forrest Wickman of Slate called the song "sad but ultimately hopeful" and thought it had similar themes to Swift's other closing tracks, such as "Begin Again" from Red. Sam Lansky from Time picked the song as one of the tracks that demonstrates Swift's songwriting in "tight, evocative images". Aswad from Billboard said "Clean" was an "aching, bittersweet" song and opined that Swift "surrenders to" Heap more than other collaborators on 1989. Amy Pettifer of The Quietus deemed the lyrics "sparkling–sad and clever". Sasha Geffen of Consequence called "Clean" a "bell-accounted number" and commended Swift's sentiment of finding strength through friendship. In a less positive review, Matthew Horton of NME thought the song was "weepy" and considered it "a late collapse" on the album.

In retrospective rankings, Billboard, Paste, Chris Willman of Variety, Mylrea, and Rob Sheffield of Rolling Stone listed "Clean" among Swift's top 20 songs; Sheffield called it an "intense finale" for 1989. Clash picked the track as one of Swift's 15 best songs—editor Sahar Ghadirian labeled the song a "masterclass in songwriting" and lauded its emotional sentiment as "empowering and validating". Mary Kate Carr from The A.V. Club wrote that while there are "occasions when Swift's whimsical metaphors can become overwrought, but the fantastical imagery of the lyrics and the zen chime sounds" work on "Clean", which makes it "a perfect ode to set oneself free" that is aware enough to admit that "just because you're clean, don't mean you don't miss it". Alex Hopper from American Songwriter viewed the song as a fan-favorite and commended how Swift opens up her struggles and ventures deep with her audience.

== Covers ==
The singer-songwriter Ingrid Michaelson recalled that she loved "Clean" upon hearing it in Swift's apartment before 1989's release; Michaelson asked Swift to send the full song to her ahead of the album's release, but Swift declined. Michaelson covered "Clean" at the Billboard Women in Music event on December 12, 2014, to honor Swift's win for Woman of the Year. On September 21, 2015, the American rock singer Ryan Adams released "Clean" as part of his track-by-track cover of Swift's 1989. Annie Zaleski of The A.V. Club commented that it has a "sleeker" production. Leah Greenblatt of Entertainment Weekly opined that it "sounds like a polished evolution" of his alternative country band Whiskeytown.

On June 9, 2021, the American singer Sara Bareilles performed a cover of "Clean" as a tribute to Taylor Swift at the annual National Music Publishers' Association meeting. On April 12, 2023, the American singer Kelly Clarkson sang the song on The Kelly Clarkson Show. Critics described the performance as "emotional" and "stunning"—Larisha Paul of Rolling Stone said that Clarkson maintained the song's "sense of rebirth and new beginnings".

== Personnel ==
"Clean" (2014)

- Taylor Swift – vocals, background vocals, songwriter, producer
- Imogen Heap – producer, songwriter, programming, background vocals, percussion, drums, mbira, vibraphone, keyboards
- Serban Ghenea – mixing
- John Hanes – mixing
- Tom Coyne – mastering

"Clean (Taylor's Version)" (2023)

- Taylor Swift – vocals, songwriter, producer
- Bryce Bordone – mix engineer
- Imogen Heap – producer, songwriter, recording, vibraphone, drums, kalimba, percussion, piano, programming, keyboards, background vocals
- Serban Ghenea – mixing
- Randy Merrill – mastering
- Christopher Rowe – vocal engineering

== Charts ==
=== "Clean" ===
2014 weekly chart performance for "Clean"
Chart (2014)	Peak position
Canada Digital Song Sales (Billboard)	45

2023 weekly chart performance for "Clean"
Chart (2023)	Peak position
Portugal (AFP)	85

=== "Clean (Taylor's Version)" ===
Chart performance for "Clean (Taylor's Version)"
Chart (2023)	Peak position
Canada Hot 100 (Billboard)	28
Global 200 (Billboard)	25
Greece International (IFPI)	49
New Zealand (Recorded Music NZ)	28
Philippines (Billboard)	13
Singapore (RIAS)	26
Sweden Heatseeker (Sverigetopplistan)	17
UK Streaming (OCC)	33
US Billboard Hot 100	30

== Certifications ==
Certifications for "Clean"
Region	Certification	Certified units/sales
Australia (ARIA)	Platinum	70,000^{‡}
New Zealand (RMNZ)	Gold	15,000^{‡}
United Kingdom (BPI)	Silver	200,000^{‡}
^{‡} Sales+streaming figures based on certification alone.

Certifications for "Clean (Taylor's Version)"
Region	Certification	Certified units/sales
Australia (ARIA)	Gold	35,000^{‡}
^{‡} Sales+streaming figures based on certification alone.
