= New Romantics (song) =

2016 single by Taylor Swift

Single by Taylor Swift

from the album 1989 (Deluxe Edition)
- Released: February 23, 2016
- Studio: MXM (Stockholm); Conway Recording (Los Angeles)
- Genre: Synth-pop
- Length: 3:50
- Label: Big Machine
- Songwriters: Taylor Swift; Max Martin; Shellback
- Producers: Max Martin; Shellback

Taylor Swift singles chronology
"Out of the Woods" (2016)	"New Romantics" (2016)	"I Don't Wanna Live Forever" (2016)

Music video
- "New Romantics" on YouTube

"New Romantics" is a song by the American singer-songwriter Taylor Swift from the deluxe edition of her fifth studio album, 1989 (2014). She wrote the song with the producers Max Martin and Shellback. The title references the New Romantic cultural movement of the 1970s and 1980s; the new wave music style of that era influenced the song's synth-pop production. "New Romantics" has an upbeat sound instrumented by pulsing synthesizers, and its lyrics are about reigniting one's hopes and energy after enduring heartbreak.

Big Machine Records released "New Romantics" as the seventh and final single from 1989 on February 23, 2016. The song's music video is a compilation of footage from the 1989 World Tour that Swift embarked on in 2015. In the United States, "New Romantics" peaked at number 46 on the Billboard Hot 100 and was certified gold by the Recording Industry Association of America. The single peaked in the top 40 on the charts in Australia, Belgium (Flanders), Lebanon, and Scotland, and it received certifications in Australia, Brazil, New Zealand, and the United Kingdom.

Many music critics hailed the energetic and lively production of "New Romantics". Several commented that the song should have been featured in 1989's standard release and have deemed it one of Swift's best songs. A few critics otherwise deemed it a forgettable track. In 2019, Rolling Stone included "New Romantics" in their list of the 100 best songs of the 2010s decade. Following a 2019 dispute regarding the ownership of Swift's back catalog, she re-recorded the song and released it as "New Romantics (Taylor's Version)" as part of her 2023 re-recorded album 1989 (Taylor's Version).

== Production and composition ==
The American singer-songwriter Taylor Swift was inspired by 1980s synth-pop to create her fifth studio album, 1989 (2014), as a recalibration of her artistic identity from country music to pop. On 1989, she enlisted the Swedish producers Max Martin and Shellback as prominent collaborators. Swift wrote "New Romantics" with Martin and Shellback, who produced it for the deluxe edition of 1989. The song's title is a reference to the New Romantic cultural movement of the late 1970s and 1980s.

"New Romantics"
"New Romantics" is a synth-pop song that evokes new wave music styles of the 1980s decade.

A synth-pop song with elements of synthwave and new wave music, "New Romantics" incorporates pulsating synthesizers. According to Slate's Forrest Wickman, the new wave influence of the track was a reference to the New Romantic cultural movement. Rolling Stone's Rob Sheffield and AllMusic's Stephen Thomas Erlewine considered "New Romantics" one of the most authentic tributes to 1980s pop music on the album; the former likened it to 1980s synth-pop, while the latter deemed it reminiscent of "1983 new wave". Corey Baesley from PopMatters opined that the track emulated the "indie electro-pop" sound of the Scottish band Chvrches. Meanwhile, the musicologist James E. Perone opined that the song evoked the "coolness" of the 1980s hit single "We Got the Beat" but was musically "more about the pop music of the 21st century" than about the prevailing styles of the New Romantic era.

The lyrics are about Swift reigniting her hopes and energy after the heartbreaks that she had endured. She jokingly compares her emotional scars to the bricks with which she could construct a castle and celebrates them as a joyful experience of youth, proclaiming, "Heartbreak is the national anthem." Pitchfork's Vrinda Jagota described the lyrics as a depiction of "a night of uninhibited hedonism". Several analyses likened "New Romantics" to Swift's other songs. Anna Leszkiewicz from the New Statesman commented that the "castle" imagery was used in a "self-referential way" and departed from the fairytale notion of her past songs, while Emily Yahr from The Washington Post compared the joyful celebration to the theme of her 2012 song "22". Slate's Carl Wilson described the song as 1989's representation of Swift's new attitude towards romance. The lyric, "The best people in life are free", sees Swift no longer seeking revenge on ex-lovers. Perone noted that the lyrics were representational of Swift's generation's defiant and carefree attitude, which he compared to that of the mods in the 1960s, specifically citing the Who's 1965 song "My Generation".

== Release ==
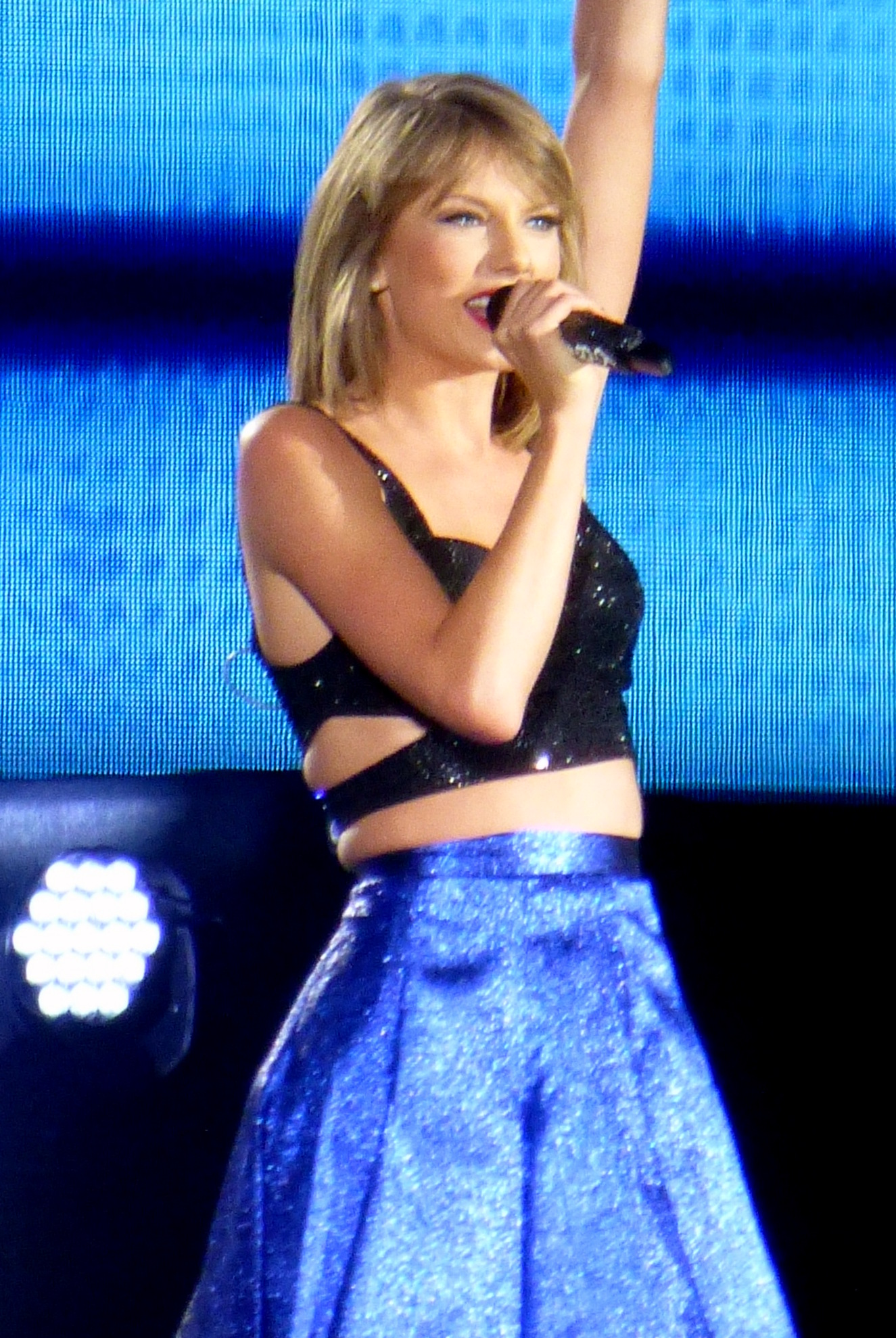
Swift performed "New Romantics" on the 1989 World Tour in 2015. Footage of the tour was included in the song's music video.

"New Romantics" was initially one of the three bonus tracks on the deluxe edition of 1989, which was available exclusively at Target in the United States. On February 17, 2015, Swift announced that she would release the three bonus tracks to iTunes Stores in the United States as promotional singles one at a time. "New Romantics" was released on March 3, 2015, by Big Machine Records. Following this release, the song entered the US Billboard Hot 100 chart dated March 21, 2015, at number 71.

On February 19, 2016, Swift announced that "New Romantics" would be the seventh and final single from 1989. Republic Records in partnership with Big Machine released the song to US contemporary hit and hot adult contemporary radio stations on February 23. Upon its single release, "New Romantics" debuted at number 28 on Pop Songs, a Billboard airplay chart; it peaked at number 18 on Pop Songs. The single peaked at number 46 on the Billboard Hot 100 chart dated April 30, 2016, and spent eight weeks on the chart. It reached the top 40 on charts in Lebanon (18), Belgian Flanders (33), Australia (35), and Scotland (40). "New Romantics" was certified gold by the Recording Industry Association of America (RIAA) for exceeding 500,000 track-equivalent units, based on sales and on-demand streams. It was also certified double platinum in Australia, platinum in New Zealand, and gold in Brazil. The song received a nomination for Choice Song – Female Artist at the 2016 Teen Choice Awards.

On April 6, Swift released the music video for "New Romantics" exclusively on Apple Music, which required a paid subscription. Directed by Jonas Åkerlund, the video consists of concert and behind-the-scenes footage during the 1989 World Tour in 2015, intertwined with Swift's voice-overs about her thoughts for her fans. Laura Bertens, a scholar in art history and cultural studies, cited "New Romantics" as an example of "why music videos often elicit strong reactions". Bertens noted that the behind-the-scenes footage of Swift's performances made the audience connect with her on a personal level, "to see the private person behind the celebrity, all the while knowing that we are looking at a performance as well". Complex's Jessie Morris deemed the exclusive Apple release part of Swift's "partnership" with Apple Music, with whom Swift had collaborated on advertisements and interviews. The Sydney Morning Herald's Karl Quinn labeled the release a "cynical move", through which Swift implicitly encouraged her fans to subscribe to Apple Music to balance the competition with Spotify—the largest on-demand streaming platform at the time. Swift had publicly condemned Spotify's free streaming services that provided low royalties for artists. Swift made the video available on her Vevo and YouTube accounts on April 13, 2016, without subscription requirements.

== Critical reception ==
Upon the release of 1989, Corey Beasley from PopMatters deemed "New Romantics" and the other two deluxe edition bonus tracks more "compositionally daring" than any track on the standard edition. Beasley favorably likened the song to the works of Chvrches, writing that "[Swift] can do it better than anyone else". Slate's Carl Wilson called it "manifesto-toned", and Pitchfork's Vrinda Jagota described the track as a "surging, euphoric" number that captures the essence of the album. Josh Duboff from Vanity Fair lamented the song's exclusion from the standard edition of 1989, writing that it could end up as an album track "on pretty much any other 2014 pop star's album". Aimee Cliff from Fact picked "New Romantics" as an example that best demonstrates Swift's ability to "[document] memories as romantic, filtered snapshots".

Sheffield ranked "New Romantics" as the second best song of 2014 and the second-greatest song of Swift's career, behind "All Too Well" (2012). He hailed it as a "work of genius, exceeding even the wildest hopes any fan could have dreamed". Rolling Stone featured "New Romantics" at number 58 in their list "100 Best Songs of the 2010s"; Brittany Spanos described it as "the type of relieving dance floor soul purge that the best pop can be". Retrospective reviews from The Guardian's Alexis Petridis, NME's Hannah Mylrae, and Paste's Jane Song have commented that the song should have made the final cut of 1989's standard edition. Lucy Ford from British GQ ranked the single among Swift's 10 best and praised its "cheeky and winking" theme. In a list ranking the bonus tracks from Swift's albums, Variety's Chris Willman ranked "New Romantics" third and described it as Swift and Martin's "peak [...] collaboration in terms of sheer ear candy".

There were less enthusiastic reviews. Nate Jones from Vulture regarded "New Romantics" as a weaker attempt at "writing a big generational attempt" than Swift's 2012 song "22". Chris Richards of The Washington Post said that the song "registers somewhere between moldy emo and the back pages of a high school literary magazine", containing some of the "worst lyrics" on 1989.

== Live performances ==
Swift included "New Romantics" on the set list for the 1989 World Tour, which ran from May to November 2015. She sang the song at the Formula 1 United States Grand Prix at the Circuit of the Americas on October 22, 2016, and at the DirecTV Super Saturday Night, as part of a series of pre-Super Bowl concerts, on February 4, 2017. Swift performed an acoustic guitar rendition at the August 9, 2023, show of the Eras Tour at SoFi Stadium in Inglewood, California, prefaced by her announcement of the October 27 release of her re-recording of 1989, 1989 (Taylor's Version). She sang the song again as part of a guitar medley with her songs "Message in a Bottle" and "How You Get the Girl" in dedication to Martin on the May 19, 2024, show of the tour at Friends Arena in Stockholm.

== Credits and personnel ==
Credits adapted from the liner notes of 1989

- Taylor Swift – vocals, background vocals, songwriter
- Cory Bice – assistant recording
- Tom Coyne – mastering
- Serban Ghenea – mixing
- John Hanes – engineered for mix
- Sam Holland – recording
- Michael Ilbert – recording
- Max Martin – producer, songwriter, keyboards, piano, programming
- Shellback – producer, songwriter, background vocals, guitar, keyboards, drum, programming, bass

== Charts ==
2015–2016 weekly chart performance
Chart (2015–2016)	Peak position
Australia (ARIA)	35
Belgium (Ultratop 50 Flanders)	33
Canada Hot 100 (Billboard)	58
Canada AC (Billboard)	46
Canada CHR/Top 40 (Billboard)	24
Canada Hot AC (Billboard)	31
France (SNEP)	190
Japan Hot 100 (Billboard)	90
Lebanon (Lebanese Top 20)	18
Slovakia Airplay (ČNS IFPI)	58
Scottish Singles Sales (Official Charts)	40
UK Singles (OCC)	132
US Billboard Hot 100	46
US Adult Contemporary (Billboard)	18
US Adult Pop Airplay (Billboard)	9
US Pop Airplay (Billboard)	18

2023 weekly chart performance
Chart (2023)	Peak position
Portugal (AFP)	65

== Certifications ==
Certifications for "New Romantics"
Region	Certification	Certified units/sales
Australia (ARIA)	2× Platinum	140,000^{‡}
Brazil (Pro-Música Brasil)	Gold	30,000^{‡}
New Zealand (RMNZ)	Platinum	30,000^{‡}
United Kingdom (BPI)	Silver	200,000^{‡}
United States (RIAA)	Gold	500,000^{‡}
^{‡} Sales+streaming figures based on certification alone.

== "New Romantics (Taylor's Version)" ==
"New Romantics (Taylor's Version)"

Song by Taylor Swift

from the album 1989 (Taylor's Version)
- Released: October 27, 2023
- Studio: Prime Recording (Nashville)
- Length: 3:50
- Label: Republic
- Songwriters: Taylor Swift; Max Martin; Shellback
- Producers: Taylor Swift; Christopher Rowe

Lyric video
- "New Romantics (Taylor's Version)" on YouTube

After signing a new contract with Republic Records, Swift began re-recording her first six studio albums in November 2020. The decision followed a public 2019 dispute between Swift and the talent manager Scooter Braun, who acquired Big Machine Records, including the masters of Swift's albums which the label had released. By re-recording the albums, Swift had full ownership of the new masters, which enabled her to control the licensing of her songs for commercial use and therefore substituted the Big Machine–owned masters.

The re-recording of "New Romantics", subtitled "Taylor's Version", was released as part of 1989's re-recording, 1989 (Taylor's Version), on October 27, 2023. Swift produced "New Romantics (Taylor's Version)" with Christopher Rowe, who had produced her previous re-recordings. The track was engineered by Derek Garten at Prime Recording Studio in Nashville, Tennessee; mixed by Ghenea at MixStar Studios in Virginia Beach, Virginia; and mastered by Randy Merrill at Sterling Sound in Edgewater, New Jersey. Rowe recorded Swift's vocals at Kitty Committee Studio in New York.

=== Personnel ===
Credits adapted from the liner notes of 1989 (Taylor's Version)

- Taylor Swift – vocals, background vocals, songwriter, producer
- Max Bernstein – synthesizer, electric guitar, acoustic guitar
- Matt Billingslea – drums, drum programming
- Bryce Bordone – engineer for mix
- Dan Burns – drum programming, synth bass, synthesizer
- Derek Garten – engineer, editing, programming
- Serban Ghenea – mixing
- Amos Heller – bass guitar
- Max Martin – songwriter
- Mike Meadows – synthesizer, acoustic guitar, electric guitar
- Brian Pruitt – drums, drum programming
- Christopher Rowe – producer, vocal engineer
- Shellback – songwriter

=== Charts ===
Chart performance for "New Romantics (Taylor's Version)"
Chart (2023)	Peak position
Canada Hot 100 (Billboard)	27
Global 200 (Billboard)	24
Greece International (IFPI)	40
New Zealand (Recorded Music NZ)	26
Singapore (RIAS)	22
Sweden Heatseeker (Sverigetopplistan)	13
UK Streaming (OCC)	31
US Billboard Hot 100	29

=== Certification ===
Certification for "New Romantics (Taylor's Version)"
Region	Certification	Certified units/sales
Australia (ARIA)	Gold	35,000^{‡}
United Kingdom (BPI)	Silver	200,000^{‡}
^{‡} Sales+streaming figures based on certification alone.
