= Sweeter than Fiction =

2013 soundtrack song by Taylor Swift

Promotional single by Taylor Swift

from the album One Chance: The Incredible True Story of Paul Potts: Motion Picture Soundtrack
- Released: October 21, 2013
- Genre: Electropop; synth-pop; bubblegum; rock; new wave
- Length: 3:54
- Label: Big Machine
- Songwriters: Taylor Swift; Jack Antonoff
- Producers: Taylor Swift; Jack Antonoff

Audio video
- "Sweeter than Fiction" on YouTube

"Sweeter than Fiction (Taylor's Version)"

Song by Taylor Swift

from the album 1989 (Taylor's Version) (Tangerine Edition)
- Released: October 27, 2023
- Studio: Rough Customer (Brooklyn); Electric Lady (New York); Sharp Sonics (Los Angeles); Conway Recording (Los Angeles)
- Length: 3:54
- Label: Republic
- Songwriters: Taylor Swift; Jack Antonoff
- Producers: Taylor Swift; Jack Antonoff

"Sweeter than Fiction" is a song by the American singer-songwriter Taylor Swift from the soundtrack to the 2013 film One Chance. Written and produced by Swift and Jack Antonoff, the track was released by Big Machine Records for download via the iTunes Store on October 21, 2013. "Sweeter than Fiction" is a 1980s-inspired electropop, synth-pop, bubblegum, rock, and new wave song with elements of Britpop. Lyrically, it details the narrator's belief in her friend that he will succeed one day. "Sweeter than Fiction" was nominated for Best Original Song at the 2014 Golden Globe Awards.

The track peaked in the top 40 on the singles charts of Canada, Ireland, New Zealand, Scotland, and the United States. Critical reception of the song was generally positive, although retrospective opinions have regarded it as a lesser entry in Swift's discography. Some critics opined that "Sweeter than Fiction" was pivotal in shaping the synth-pop sound of Swift's album 1989, as well as the long-lasting collaboration between Swift and Antonoff. Following the 2019 dispute over the ownership of Swift's back catalog, she re-recorded the song as "Sweeter than Fiction (Taylor's Version)", which was released exclusively on the Tangerine Edition of her fourth re-recorded album, 1989 (Taylor's Version) (2023).

== Background and production ==
Taylor Swift began writing songs for her fifth studio album while embarking on the Red Tour (2013–2014). Upon watching the 2013 biographical film One Chance about the opera singer Paul Potts, she insisted on writing a song for the film's soundtrack, although her management and record label initially refused to release new music in between different album cycles to avoid overexposure. Swift stated that she viewed One Chance as a "love story" and that she was inspired by Potts's relationship with his wife to write the song "Sweeter than Fiction" from his wife's perspective. She also expressed her relief in stepping away from her usual autobiographical songwriting approach, adding that "there's a different kind of thrill you get hoping you have accurately portrayed someone else's emotions".

Swift wrote the lyrical hook for "Sweeter than Fiction" and collaborated with Jack Antonoff to finish writing and producing the song. She said that Antonoff was her choice collaborator because of his 1980s and 1990s-inspired production, "walking this line between very current-sounding music and shades of nostalgic-sounding music". They were inspired by a particular snare drum from a song by Fine Young Cannibals; they sent each other ideas and wrote the track at Antonoff's apartment in New York City.

== Releases and live performances ==
"Sweeter than Fiction" plays during One Chance's closing credits and appears as the fifteenth song on the soundtrack's track listing. The film, which tells the story of Potts's transition from a telephone salesman into an opera singer after winning Britain's Got Talent, premiered at the Toronto International Film Festival in September 2013. Big Machine Records released "Sweeter than Fiction" for digital download via the iTunes Store as a promotional single on October 21, 2013. In November 2013, Swift performed the song on guitar at a press conference for One Chance in Beverly Hills, California.

Swift departed from Big Machine and signed with Republic Records in November 2018. She began re-recording her first six studio albums in November 2020. The decision followed a public dispute in 2019 between her and Scooter Braun, who acquired Big Machine including the masters of her albums which the label had released. The re-recording of "Sweeter than Fiction", subtitled "Taylor's Version", was released as part of a Target-exclusive "Tangerine Edition" LP record of her fourth re-recorded album, 1989 (Taylor's Version), on October 27, 2023. It was recorded at Rough Customer Studio in Brooklyn, Electric Lady Studios in New York, and Sharp Sonics Studios and Conway Recording Studios in Los Angeles. Swift performed "Sweeter than Fiction" live in a mashup with her song "Holy Ground" (2012), at the Eras Tour concert on July 6, 2024, in Amsterdam, Netherlands.

== Music and lyrics ==
"Sweeter than Fiction"
A sample of "Sweeter than Fiction", featuring an electronic arrangement of synths and drum machines

"Sweeter than Fiction" is 3 minutes and 54 seconds long. It is a 1980s-inspired pop, electropop, synth-pop, bubblegum, rock, and new wave song. It contains electronic beats and influences of 1980s pop, Britpop, and new wave, demonstrated by the underlying keyboards, densely arranged guitars, and a drum machine-based rhythm, accentuated with licks of surf guitar, drum fills, and energetic synths. Uproxx's Melinda Newman thought that the opening guitar line evoked Swift's previous single "You Belong with Me", "run through Fun's synthesizers and an '80s British synth pop filter".

There were comparisons of "Sweeter than Fiction" to the music of other artists. Rolling Stone's Rob Sheffield likened the song's guitar solo to that of Fleetwood Mac's "Gypsy" (1982). Ellis Winder of the Northwest Arkansas Democrat Gazette opined that the 1980s sensibilities evoked the Bangles and the Go-Go's, while Carl Williott of Idolator pointed to the Killers, Tom Petty, and Twin Shadow as potential references, and Rolling Stone's Kory Grow opined that the track was reminiscent of dream pop bands like the Cranberries and Simple Minds. The musicologist James E. Perone, meanwhile, considered the track more stylistically reminiscent of Swift's early hits produced with Nathan Chapman. Some critics also thought that it recalled the prom scenes in John Hughes's films. Antonoff hinted that the song was inspired by Hughes's soundtracks.

Lyrically, Swift wrote "Sweeter than Fiction" from the perspective of Potts's wife, who stood by him and unwaveringly supported his dream of becoming an opera singer even when he was unemployed. She also connected with Potts's resilience despite skepticism from others, including his own father. "Sweeter than Fiction" is about believing in a friend's potential: Swift sings from the point of view of a friend who has always believed in this friend and stood with him despite the rejection that came before the final victory, acknowledging both the external pressures and the low self-confidence that he suffers from; the chorus goes, "Then you'll stand 10 feet tall/ I will say, 'I knew it all along.'"

== Critical reception ==
Professional ratings
Review scores
Source	Rating
Digital Spy	4/5 stars
Northwest Arkansas Democrat Gazette	B+
Rolling Stone	3.5/5 stars

Several initial reviews of the track considered it catchy. Sheffield described the song as a "whirlwind tour of the prom scene in every John Hughes movie". Entertainment Weekly's Grady Smith praised it for being "uplifting without being hokey and sweet without being cloying", describing it as "addictive". Brian Mansfield from USA Today wrote that its "irresistible" sound turns it into "kind of record that makes you want to ask somebody to the prom in Pretty in Pink". Carl Williott of Idolator called the song "pretty great", deeming the synth-pop/new wave production "confident" and "surprisingly bold" for Swift, while Mikael Wood of the Los Angeles Times complimented how well Swift executed the early 1980s new wave sound. Writing for Digital Spy, Lewis Corner highlighted the "swooping chorus, which is underpinned by an '80s riff that makes you want to fist-pump the air on top of a hill in classic movie style".

Winder described "Sweeter than Fiction" as "alluring" and wrote that "Swift's pop chops are razor-sharp." Taste of Country's Christina Vinson dubbed the track "catchy and meaningful" and thought that "the lyrics sum up the One Chance plot incredibly well". In a more reserved review, Spin's Marc Hogan wrote that while the lyrical content was not groundbreaking, the melody was catchy enough to become commercially successful. "Sweeter than Fiction" was nominated for Best Original Song at the 2014 Golden Globe Awards. This was Swift's second consecutive (and overall) nomination in the category, after "Safe & Sound" the previous year.

In retrospective reviews, Sheffield and NME's Hannah Mylrea regarded it as a first taste of the synth-pop sound of Swift's next album, 1989 (2014). Sheffield and Vulture's Nate Jones ranked it among the lower-tier of rankings of Swift's entire catalog: the former placed it at number 269 out of 286 total songs as of October 2025, while the latter ranked it 155th out of 245 songs as of May 2024. Mylrea was more positive, ranking it at number 69 out of 161 as of September 2020. In 2022, Business Insider ranked "Sweeter than Fiction" as Swift's sixth-best soundtrack song, with Courteney Larocca calling it a "pivotal moment in Swiftian history" due to it being the first collaboration between Swift and Antonoff. Meanwhile, Billboard ranked it fifth on their 2025 compilation of Swift's soundtrack songs.

== Commercial performance ==
"Sweeter than Fiction" debuted and peaked at number 34 on the US Billboard Hot 100 chart dated October 27, 2013. That same week, the track debuted at number six on the Hot Digital Songs chart, with first-week downloads of 116,000. Elsewhere, the song peaked in the top 40 in Canada (17), New Zealand (26), Ireland (38), and Scotland (39); while charting at number 44 in Australia and number 45 in the United Kingdom. It also charted at number 83 in Italy and number three on South Korea's international singles chart.

== Charts ==
Chart performance
Chart (2013)	Peak position
Australia (ARIA)	44
Canada Hot 100 (Billboard)	17
Ireland (IRMA)	38
Italy (FIMI)	83
New Zealand (Recorded Music NZ)	26
Scottish Singles Sales (Official Charts)	39
South Korea International (Gaon)	3
UK Singles (Official Charts)	45
US Billboard Hot 100	34
