= Now That We Don't Talk =

2023 song by Taylor Swift

Song by Taylor Swift

from the album 1989 (Taylor's Version)
- Released: October 27, 2023
- Studio: Conway Recording (Los Angeles); Electric Lady (New York); Rough Customer (New York); Sharp Sonics (Los Angeles)
- Genre: Synth-pop; disco
- Length: 2:26
- Label: Republic
- Songwriters: Taylor Swift; Jack Antonoff
- Producers: Taylor Swift; Jack Antonoff

Lyric video
- "Now That We Don't Talk" on YouTube

"Now That We Don't Talk" (Note: Subtitled "(Taylor's Version) (From the Vault)") is a song by the American singer-songwriter Taylor Swift from her fourth re-recorded album, 1989 (Taylor's Version) (2023). It is one of the album's "From the Vault" tracks that were intended for but excluded from her fourth studio album, 1989 (2014). Written and produced by Swift and Jack Antonoff, "Now That We Don't Talk" is a synth-pop and disco song featuring disco grooves, falsetto vocals, and thrumming synthesizers. The lyrics are about contempt for an estranged ex-lover.

Music critics generally praised the production as catchy and the lyrics as witty. "Now That We Don't Talk" peaked at number two on the Billboard Global 200 chart as well as in those of Australia, Canada, New Zealand, the United Kingdom, and the United States, where the track became Swift's record-extending ninth number-two song on the Billboard Hot 100. It received certifications from Australia, Brazil, New Zealand, and the UK. Swift performed "Now That We Don't Talk" two times on her Eras Tour (2023–2024).

== Background and release ==
After signing a new contract with Republic Records, the singer-songwriter Taylor Swift began re-recording her first six studio albums in November 2020. The decision followed a public 2019 dispute between Swift and the talent manager Scooter Braun, who acquired Big Machine Records, including the masters of Swift's albums which the label had released. By re-recording the albums, Swift had full ownership of the new masters, which enabled her to control the licensing of her songs for commercial use and therefore substituted the Big Machine–owned masters. From July 2021 to July 2023, Swift released three re-recorded albums of her earlier releases: Fearless (Taylor's Version), Red (Taylor's Version), and Speak Now (Taylor's Version); each album also featured several unreleased "From the Vault" tracks that she had written but left out of the original albums' track listings.

Republic Records released Swift's fourth re-recorded album, 1989 (Taylor's Version), on October 27, 2023, on the ninth anniversary of her fifth original studio album, 1989 (2014). The original album was Swift's first "official pop" album after she had marketed her first four albums to country radio, and it transformed her artistry and image from country to pop. As with her other re-recorded projects, 1989 (Taylor's Version) features five newly recorded "From the Vault" tracks that Swift had written but left out of the original track listing. Jack Antonoff co-wrote four and co-produced five vault tracks with Swift. According to Swift, "Now That We Don't Talk" was late into the production of 1989 and was left out because the personnel "couldn't get [it] right at the time". Officially titled "Now That We Don't Talk (Taylor's Version) (From the Vault)", it is track 19 out of 21 on the track-list of 1989 (Taylor's Version). Swift performed the song live on acoustic guitar on November 24, 2023 during a São Paulo show of her Eras Tour. She sang it again as part of a guitar mashup with her song "The Tortured Poets Department" (2024) on May 25, 2024, in Lisbon.

== Music and lyrics ==
Swift and Antonoff wrote and produced "Now That We Don't Talk". Antonoff and the engineers Laura Sisk and David Hart, assisted by Jack Manning, Megan Searl, and Jon Sher, recorded the track at four studios: Conway Recording Studios, Sharp Sonics (Los Angeles), Electric Lady Studios, and Rough Customer (New York). Antonoff also programmed the song, played synthesizers and guitar, and provided background vocals. Zem Audu played additional synthesizers and recorded his part at Audu Studio (Brooklyn). Sean Hutchinson and Michael Riddleberger played and recorded drums at Hutchinson Sound Studio (Brooklyn). Mikey Freedom Hart played bass, synthesizer, electric guitar, and Rhodes piano, which he recorded at Big Mercy Studio (Brooklyn). Evan Smith also played additional synthesizer and saxophone and recorded the instruments at Pleasure Hill (Portland). The track was mixed by Serban Ghenea at MixStar Studios (Virginia Beach, Virginia) and mastered by Randy Merrill at Sterling Sound (Edgewater, New Jersey).

"Now That We Don't Talk"
A sample of "Now That We Don't Talk", showcasing the synth-pop and disco production with thrumming synths and falsetto vocals

"Now That We Don't Talk" is a synth-pop and disco song. At 2 minutes and 26 seconds long, it is the shortest track from 1989 (Taylor's Version). The production features disco grooves, falsetto vocals in the chorus, and thrumming synths that drive the beats. Music critics compared the song's production to the sound of Swift's previous releases. Time critic Rachel Sonis deemed it the "most 1989-sounding" among the vault tracks. Variety critic Chris Willman said the track has a "light pop-suspense feel" that recalled the song "Mastermind" from Swift's 2022 album Midnights. In a review for NJ.com, Bobby Olivier said the vocals resembled Bleachers' 2014 song "Shadow" and the production's "high-gloss shimmer" evoked Swift's "Bejeweled" from Midnights.

"Now That We Don't Talk" has lyrics that ostracize an ex-lover. In the song, Swift sings, "from the outside, it looks like you're trying lives on." As Swift moves on from the ex-lover, she accepts that she and the ex-lover cannot remain friends ("I cannot be your friend so I pay the price of what I lost, and what it cost") and seeks advice from her mother. She further mocks the ex-lover's lifestyle and taste, "I don't have to pretend I like acid rock / Or that I like to be on a mega-yacht / With important men who think important thoughts." In the Los Angeles Times, Mikael Wood wrote that the lyrics criticizing the ex-boyfriend were reminiscent of Swift's 2010 song "Dear John".

== Critical reception ==
Rob Sheffield of Rolling Stone said the song showcased Swift's "acerbic wit". Paste critic Elizabeth Braaten described the song as "an inevitable instant classic in Swiftian lore", and The Line of Best Fit critic Kelsey Barnes praised Swift's falsetto on the track as being "deliciously infectious". NME's Hollie Geraghty deemed "Now That We Don't Talk" the best "Vault" track from 1989 (Taylor's Version), praising Swift's vocals and the lyrics for showcasing a dry and youthful humor. Uproxx writer Josh Kurp complimented the track's 1980s musical sensation and said it has a radio hit potential. Olivier ranked it fourth among the five vault tracks from 1989 (Taylor's Version), deeming it a "windows-down ... banger". Wood ranked it second and complimented it as a "hilarious take-down of a dude [Swift's] elated to have kicked to the curb". On a less positive side, BBC Entertainment reporters deemed it and the other vault tracks inferior to the original 1989 album. Alex Berry of Clash regarded "Now That We Don't Talk" as the weakest track on the re-recorded album because it is not as outstanding as the other tracks.

== Commercial performance ==
After 1989 (Taylor's Version) was released, "Now That We Don't Talk" debuted at number two on the singles charts of Australia, Canada, New Zealand, and the United Kingdom. It opened at number four in Ireland and number nine in the Philippines. The track also charted in the top 100 of singles charts in several European territories including Norway (number 33), the Netherlands (number 35), Lithuania (number 44), and Sweden (number 51). In the United States, "Now That We Don't Talk" debuted at number two on the US Billboard Hot 100 chart dated November 11, 2023, trailing behind the week's chart topper "Is It Over Now?", another track from 1989 (Taylor's Version). This chart achievement extended Swift's record for the most top-10 songs (49) and most top-five songs (31) on the Billboard Hot 100 among women. On the Billboard Global 200, it also debuted at number two behind "Is It Over Now?". The song has received certifications in several countries, including silver in the United Kingdom, gold in Brazil and New Zealand, and platinum in Australia.

== Personnel ==
Credits are adapted from the liner notes of 1989 (Taylor's Version).

- Taylor Swift – vocals, songwriter, producer
- Jack Antonoff – producer, songwriter, recording, synthesizer, programming, background vocals, guitar
- Zem Audu – synthesizer, synthesizer recording
- Bryce Bordone – engineer for mix
- Serban Ghenea – mixing
- Mikey Freedom Hart – bass, synthesizer, electric guitar, Rhodes
- David Hart – recording
- Sean Hutchinson – drums, percussion
- Jack Manning – assistant recording
- Randy Merrill – mastering
- Michael Riddleberger – drums, percussion
- Megan Searl – assistant recording
- Laura Sisk – recording
- Jon Sher – assistant recording
- Evan Smith – saxophone, synthesizer, programming

== Charts ==
Chart performance
| Chart (2023) | Peak position |
|---|---|
| Australia (ARIA) | 2 |
| Belgium (Billboard) | 25 |
| Canada Hot 100 (Billboard) | 2 |
| Czech Republic Singles Digital (ČNS IFPI) | 52 |
| France (SNEP) | 148 |
| Global 200 (Billboard) | 2 |
| Greece International (IFPI) | 7 |
| Ireland (IRMA) | 4 |
| Latvia (LaIPA) | 15 |
| Lithuania (AGATA) | 44 |
| Malaysia (Billboard) | 22 |
| Netherlands (Single Top 100) | 35 |
| New Zealand (Recorded Music NZ) | 2 |
| Nigeria (TurnTable Top 100) | 85 |
| Norway (VG-lista) | 33 |
| Philippines (Billboard) | 9 |
| Poland (Polish Streaming Top 100) | 57 |
| Portugal (AFP) | 26 |
| Singapore (RIAS) | 8 |
| Slovakia Singles Digital (ČNS IFPI) | 48 |
| Spain (Promusicae) | 75 |
| Sweden (Sverigetopplistan) | 51 |
| UAE (IFPI) | 18 |
| UK Singles (Official Charts) | 2 |
| US Billboard Hot 100 | 2 |
| Vietnam (Vietnam Hot 100) | 74 |

== Certifications ==
Certifications
| Region | Certification | Certified units/sales |
|---|---|---|
| Australia (ARIA) | Platinum | 70,000^{‡} |
| Brazil (Pro-Música Brasil) | Gold | 20,000^{‡} |
| New Zealand (RMNZ) | Gold | 15,000^{‡} |
| United Kingdom (BPI) | Silver | 200,000^{‡} |
^{‡} Sales+streaming figures based on certification alone.
