= Mikey Freedom Hart =

American singer-songwriter

- Born: Lake Charles, Louisiana, United States
- Genres: Jazz; indie pop; alternative hip hop
- Occupations: Singer-songwriter, multi-instrumentalist, and record producer
- Years active: 1990–present
- Member of: Bleachers

Mikey Freedom Hart is an American singer-songwriter, multi-instrumentalist, and record producer. He has worked with Bleachers, Taylor Swift, Empress Of, Blood Orange, ASAP Rocky, Lana Del Rey, Tei Shi, and the Chicks. He has received three Grammy Award nominations, winning twice.

A classically trained pianist, Hart has performed and recorded with various musical instruments. He now currently plays live for Bleachers and Blood Orange.

== Life and career ==
Hart was born and raised in Lake Charles, Louisiana where he attended Barbe High School followed by McNeese State University. He started learning piano classically at age three, grew up performing and singing in church. He then moved to New York City at the age of 16.

In 2018, Hart co-wrote the Dev Hynes song "Hope" featuring Puff Daddy and Tei Shi in the Negro Swan album. He has played and added additional production to Santigold's single "Banshee". He co-produced and co-wrote the Portugal. The Man's song "Easy Tiger". In 2020, he played and recorded DX7, electric guitar, nylon guitar, Rhodes, and celesta on Taylor Swift's song "Gold Rush". He can be heard playing a number of instruments and adding his sound to Swift's albums Lover, Folklore, Evermore, Fearless (Taylor's Version), Red (Taylor's Version), Midnights, Speak Now (Taylor's Version), 1989 (Taylor's Version), and The Tortured Poets Department.

He played piano on Lana Del Rey's albums Norman Fucking Rockwell! and Chemtrails over the Country Club. Hart has also worked with several other artists including Empress Of, ASAP Rocky, The Chicks, and Emily Lind. He was a producer on the Jon Batiste's single "Freedom" and album We Are for which he was nominated for Grammy Awards in 2021.

== Bands ==
Hart plays keyboards for the Bleachers. He also plays keyboard and piano for Blood Orange,

He performed and helped direct the musical component of Louis Vuitton Fall 2019 Menswear Fashion show at Paris Fashion Week.

=== Ex Reyes ===
In 2015, Hart started a solo project as Brooklyn-based psychedelic-soul band "Ex Reyes". Different musicians are performing for the band.

In 2016, music video for the song "Keeping U in Line" was released. In 2017, an original song "Blame Me" was released with Amazon Music.

== Accolades ==
Hart was nominated for three Grammy Awards for Album of the Year for producing and playing on Jon Batiste's album We Are in 2022 and for engineering on Taylor Swift's albums Evermore in 2022 and Midnights in 2024. He won for We Are and Midnights.

Year	Nominee / work	Award	Result
2022	We Are (producer)	Grammy Award for Album of the Year	Won
2022	Evermore (musician)	Grammy Award for Album of the Year	Nominated
2024	Midnights (musician)	Grammy Award for Album of the Year	Won
