= Wonderland (Taylor Swift song) =

2015 promotional single by Taylor Swift

Promotional single by Taylor Swift

from the album 1989 (Deluxe Edition)
- Released: February 17, 2015
- Studio: Conway (Los Angeles)
- Genre: Electropop
- Length: 4:05
- Label: Big Machine
- Songwriters: Taylor Swift; Max Martin; Shellback
- Producers: Max Martin; Shellback

Audio video
- "Wonderland" on YouTube

"Wonderland (Taylor's Version)"

Song by Taylor Swift

from the album 1989 (Taylor's Version)
- Released: October 27, 2023
- Studio: Kitty Committee (New York)
- Length: 4:05
- Label: Republic
- Songwriters: Taylor Swift; Max Martin; Shellback
- Producers: Taylor Swift; Christopher Rowe

Lyric video
- "Wonderland (Taylor's Version)" on YouTube

"Wonderland" is a song by the American singer-songwriter Taylor Swift from the deluxe version of her fifth studio album, 1989 (2014). Swift wrote it with the Swedish record producers Max Martin and Shellback, who both produced the track. It was released for download via the iTunes Store on February 17, 2015, by Big Machine Records. An electropop song, "Wonderland" takes inspiration from the children's novel Alice in Wonderland (1865) to describe an intense relationship, referencing characters from the book. Music critics praised the songwriting as witty, and several picked it as an underrated track from Swift's discography.

"Wonderland" charted in Australia, Canada, and the United States. Following a 2019 dispute over the masters of her first six albums, Swift re-recorded the song as "Wonderland (Taylor's Version)", and released it as part of her fourth re-recorded album, 1989 (Taylor's Version) (2023). The re-recorded song reached number 32 on the Billboard Global 200 and charted in Australia, the United States, New Zealand, and Canada. Swift occasionally performed "Wonderland" live on her concert tours.

== Background and production ==
Taylor Swift had identified as a country musician until her fourth studio album, Red, released on October 22, 2012. It incorporates eclectic pop and rock styles beyond the country stylings of her past albums, which led to critics questioning her country-music identity. Swift began writing songs for her fifth studio album in mid-2013 while touring on the Red Tour (2013–2014). Inspired by 1980s synth-pop, she named the album 1989 after her birth year to signify an artistic reinvention, describing it as her first "official pop album". Max Martin and Shellback produced seven out of 13 tracks for 1989's standard edition, and two out of the three bonus tracks in the deluxe edition, including "Wonderland".

== Music and lyrics ==
Both the original and re-recorded versions of "Wonderland" are four minutes and five seconds long. An electropop song, "Wonderland" is instrumented by synthesizers, heavy programmed drum machines, syncopated percussion, and a distorted and filtered synth bass. Lyrically, the song takes inspiration from the children's novel Alice in Wonderland (1865). Swift uses "falling down the rabbit hole" as a metaphor for falling in love and going insane in the process, while the line "haven't you heard what becomes of curious minds?" references Alice's observation that "curiosity often leads to trouble". The line "flash your green eyes" is also a reference to a character in the book, the Cheshire Cat. The song is about a woman, mad in love, who follows a lover into what is supposedly a safe place, referred to in-song as "Wonderland". Both lovers rush into the relationship without thinking twice, consumed by erotic desire. The first draft for the song contained more references to Alice in Wonderland, with the male lover proclaiming them king and queen.

== Releases and live performances ==
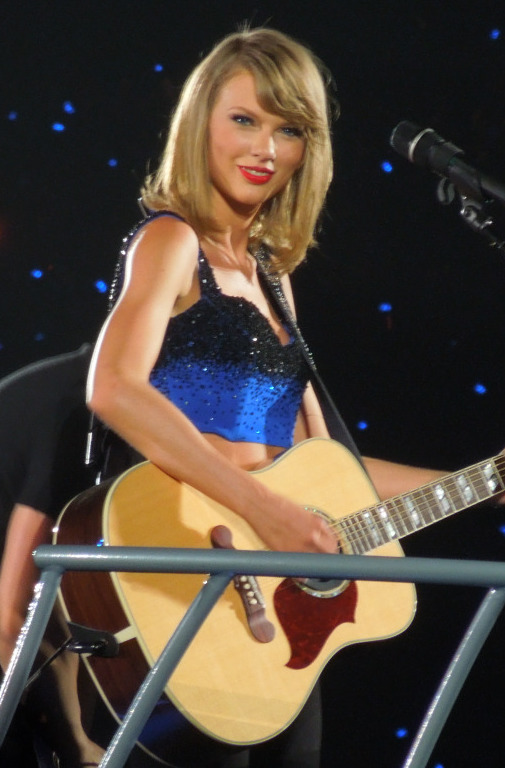
Swift occasionally performed "Wonderland" on acoustic guitar during the 1989 World Tour in 2015.

"Wonderland" was officially released on October 27, 2014, under Big Machine Records, on the deluxe version of 1989; it is the fourteenth track and the first of three deluxe tracks on the album's track listing. It was originally only available on a CD variant, which was available exclusively in Target stores in the United States. On February 17, 2015, Swift announced on Twitter that "Wonderland" would be available for digital download on the iTunes Store on the same day, and that the other two tracks exclusive to the deluxe edition of 1989—"You Are in Love" and "New Romantics"—would be available on iTunes soon. "Wonderland" became available for streaming on Apple Music and Spotify on June 30, 2015, and June 9, 2017, respectively.

After signing a new contract with Republic Records, Swift began re-recording her first six studio albums in November 2020. The decision came after a 2019 public dispute between Swift and the talent manager Scooter Braun, who acquired Big Machine Records, including the masters of Swift's albums the label had released. By re-recording them, Swift had full ownership of the new masters, including the copyright licensing of her songs, devaluing the Big Machine-owned masters. The re-recording of "Wonderland", subtitled "Taylor's Version", was released as part of Swift's fourth re-recorded album, 1989 (Taylor's Version), on October 27, 2023. Swift produced the new version with Christopher Rowe, who recorded her vocals at the Kitty Committee Studio in New York City.

Swift performed "Wonderland" on some dates of the 1989 World Tour (2015). She played it during the Houston stops of the Reputation Stadium Tour (2018) and the Eras Tour (2023–2024). She performed it during the Eras Tour in a mashup with "The 1" (2020) in Milan, and with "Haunted" (2011) in Vancouver.

== Critical reception ==
Rose Androwich of The Observer commended Swift's ability to "make connections to popular culture while crafting a distinct narrative of her life", applauding the lyrics of "Wonderland" as "witty". In a retrospective ranking of Swift's discography in 2024, Rob Sheffield of Rolling Stone ranked the track 128th out of 274. Saloni Gajjar and Mary Kate Carr of The A.V. Club, as well as Callie Ahlgrim and Kim Renfro of Business Insider, listed "Wonderland" as one of Swift's 22 most underrated songs. Gajjar said that although "on first listen, it's sonically jarring", the track "doesn't get the adulation it demands". She picked "We found Wonderland/ You and I got lost in it/ And life was never worse but never better" as the song's "most striking lyric". Ahlgrim thought that the track had the potential to be a single due to its "booming synths and sticky melodies that were emblematic of Swift's biggest pop era." Rachel Martin of Notion commended the "cleaner" vocals of the re-recorded "Wonderland (Taylor's Version)".

== Commercial performance ==
"Wonderland" peaked at number 51 on the Billboard Hot 100 chart on the US Billboard Hot 100, number 59 on the Canadian Hot 100, and number 171 on the UK singles chart. The track received a platinum certification in Australia and a silver certification in the United Kingdom. The re-recorded song, "Wonderland (Taylor's Version)", charted in the United States (33), Canada (37), New Zealand (36), and on the Billboard Global 200 (32). The re-recorded version received a gold certification in Brazil.

== Personnel ==
"Wonderland" (2014)

- Taylor Swift – lead vocals, background vocals, songwriter, producer
- Jack Antonoff – songwriter, producer, keyboards, drums, electric guitar, bass guitar
- Max Martin – vocal producer
- Serban Ghenea – mixing
- John Hanes – engineered for mix
- Peter Carlsson – Pro Tools engineer
- Tom Coyne – mastering

"Wonderland (Taylor's Version)" (2023)

- Taylor Swift – vocals, background vocals, producer
- Mike Meadows – synthesizer, acoustic guitar
- Amos Heller – bass guitar
- Dan Burns – drum programming, synth bass, synthesizer
- Matt Billingslea – drum programming, drums, percussion
- Max Bernstein – electric guitar, synthesizer, acoustic guitar
- Derek Garten – programming
- Brian Pruitt – drum programming, drums
- Christopher Rowe – producer, engineering, vocal engineering
- Randy Merrill – mastering
- Ryan Smith – mastering
- Serban Ghenea – mixing
- Derek Garten – engineering, editing
- Dan Burns – additional engineering

== Charts ==
=== "Wonderland" ===
2014–2015 weekly chart performance for "Wonderland"
Chart (2014–2015)	Peak position
Australia (ARIA)	84
Canada Hot 100 (Billboard)	59
UK Singles (Official Charts Company)	171
US Billboard Hot 100	51

=== "Wonderland (Taylor's Version)" ===
Chart performance for "Wonderland (Taylor's Version)"
Chart (2023)	Peak position
Australia (ARIA)	22
Canada Hot 100 (Billboard)	37
Global 200 (Billboard)	32
Greece International (IFPI Greece)	52
New Zealand (Recorded Music NZ)	36
Portugal (AFP)	99
UK Audio Streaming (Official Charts)	35
US Billboard Hot 100	39

== Certifications ==
Certifications for "Wonderland"
Region	Certification	Certified units/sales
Australia (ARIA)	Platinum	70,000^{‡}
New Zealand (RMNZ)	Gold	15,000^{‡}
United Kingdom (BPI)	Silver	200,000^{‡}
^{‡} Sales+streaming figures based on certification alone.

Certifications for "Wonderland (Taylor's Version)"
Region	Certification	Certified units/sales
Australia (ARIA)	Gold	35,000^{‡}
Brazil (Pro-Música Brasil)	Gold	20,000^{‡}
^{‡} Sales+streaming figures based on certification alone.
