= 1989 (album) =

- Standard North American cover

Studio album by Taylor Swift
- Released: October 27, 2014
- Recorded: c. 2013–2014
- Studios: Conway Recording (Los Angeles); Jungle City (New York City); Lamby's House (Brooklyn); MXM (Stockholm); Pain in the Art (Nashville); Elevator Nobody (Gothenburg); The Hideaway (London)
- Genre: Synth-pop
- Length: 48:41
- Label: Big Machine
- Producers: Max Martin; Taylor Swift; Shellback; Jack Antonoff; Ryan Tedder; Noel Zancanella; Ali Payami; Nathan Chapman; Imogen Heap; Mattman & Robin

Taylor Swift chronology
Red (2012)	1989 (2014)	Reputation (2017)

Singles from 1989
- 1. "Shake It Off" Released: August 18, 2014; 2. "Blank Space" Released: November 10, 2014; 3. "Style" Released: February 9, 2015; 4. "Bad Blood" Released: May 17, 2015; 5. "Wildest Dreams" Released: August 31, 2015; 6. "Out of the Woods" Released: January 19, 2016; 7. "New Romantics" Released: February 23, 2016

1989 is the fifth studio album by the American singer-songwriter Taylor Swift. It was released on October 27, 2014, through Big Machine Records. Titled after Swift's birth year as a symbolic rebirth, the album recalibrated her artistic identity from country music to pop.

Swift produced 1989 with Max Martin, Shellback, Jack Antonoff, Ryan Tedder, Nathan Chapman, and Imogen Heap. Its 1980s-inspired synth-pop production incorporates dense synthesizers, programmed drum machines, and processed electronic backing vocals, abandoning the acoustic arrangements that had characterized Swift's past albums. The songs chronicle the aftermath of a failed relationship with lyrics that expand on Swift's autobiographical details; they depict heartbreak, recovery, and self-discovery from lighthearted, wistful, and nostalgic perspectives.

1989 was promoted with the 1989 World Tour, the highest-grossing concert tour of 2015. Its seven singles included the US Billboard Hot 100 number-ones "Shake It Off", "Blank Space", and "Bad Blood", and the top-ten entries "Style" and "Wildest Dreams". In the United States, 1989 spent 11 weeks atop the Billboard 200 and was certified 14-times platinum by the Recording Industry Association of America. It has sold 14 million copies worldwide and received platinum certifications across Europe, the Americas, and Asia–Pacific. Swift and Big Machine withheld the album from free streaming services for nearly three years, prompting an industry discourse on the impact of streaming on record sales.

Initial reviews of 1989 generally praised its production and Swift's songwriting, although some critics argued that the synth-pop production undermined her singer-songwriter identity—a criticism that has been retrospectively regarded by academics and journalists as rockist. The most-awarded pop album of all time, 1989 won Album of the Year and Best Pop Vocal Album at the 2016 Grammy Awards. Regarded by critics as a modern pop-music classic, 1989 was included in Rolling Stone's 500 Greatest Albums of All Time, transformed Swift's status to that of a pop icon, and promoted poptimism. In 2026, the Library of Congress selected 1989 for preservation in the National Recording Registry as "culturally, historically, or aesthetically significant".

== Background ==
Taylor Swift had identified as a country musician up until her fourth studio album, Red, released on October 22, 2012. Promoted by Big Machine Records to country radio and awards shows, Red incorporates pop and rock styles in addition to the country pop sound that had characterized her discography, leading to many critics regarding it as a pop or rock album as much as a country one. Its two most commercially successful singles—"We Are Never Ever Getting Back Together" and "I Knew You Were Trouble"—are pop songs with electronic productions that solidified Swift's popularity in mainstream pop music. The media questioned her status as a country artist, to which she responded in a 2013 interview in The Wall Street Journal that it was not her concern to label herself with a specific genre.

Swift's rising fame was accompanied by media scrutiny on her love life. Her relationship with the English singer Harry Styles that lasted for several months in 2013 received extensive tabloid coverage. This and multiple previous short-lived romances blemished her "America's Sweetheart" image: they overshadowed Swift's artistic considerations and turned her into a target of slut-shaming. In March 2014, she relocated from Nashville, Tennessee to New York City. To reclaim narrative on her public image, Swift stayed single and went out in public with her female celebrity friends in a New York street style: bob cut, midriff-showing high-cut outfits, miniskirts, and high heels. The geographical pivot, media scrutiny, and single status informed the songwriting for her next album.

== Concept and development ==
Swift began writing her fifth studio album in mid-2013 while on the Red Tour. According to her, Red was an album where she pursued both pop and country, and she wanted its follow-up album to be both "sonically cohesive" and "blatant pop", believing that "if you chase two rabbits, you lose them both". She considered Red's single "I Knew You Were Trouble", which spent seven weeks atop the Pop Songs chart, her "signal flare" to do so.

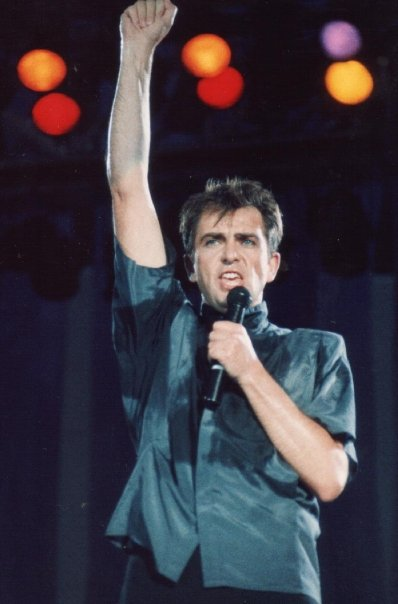
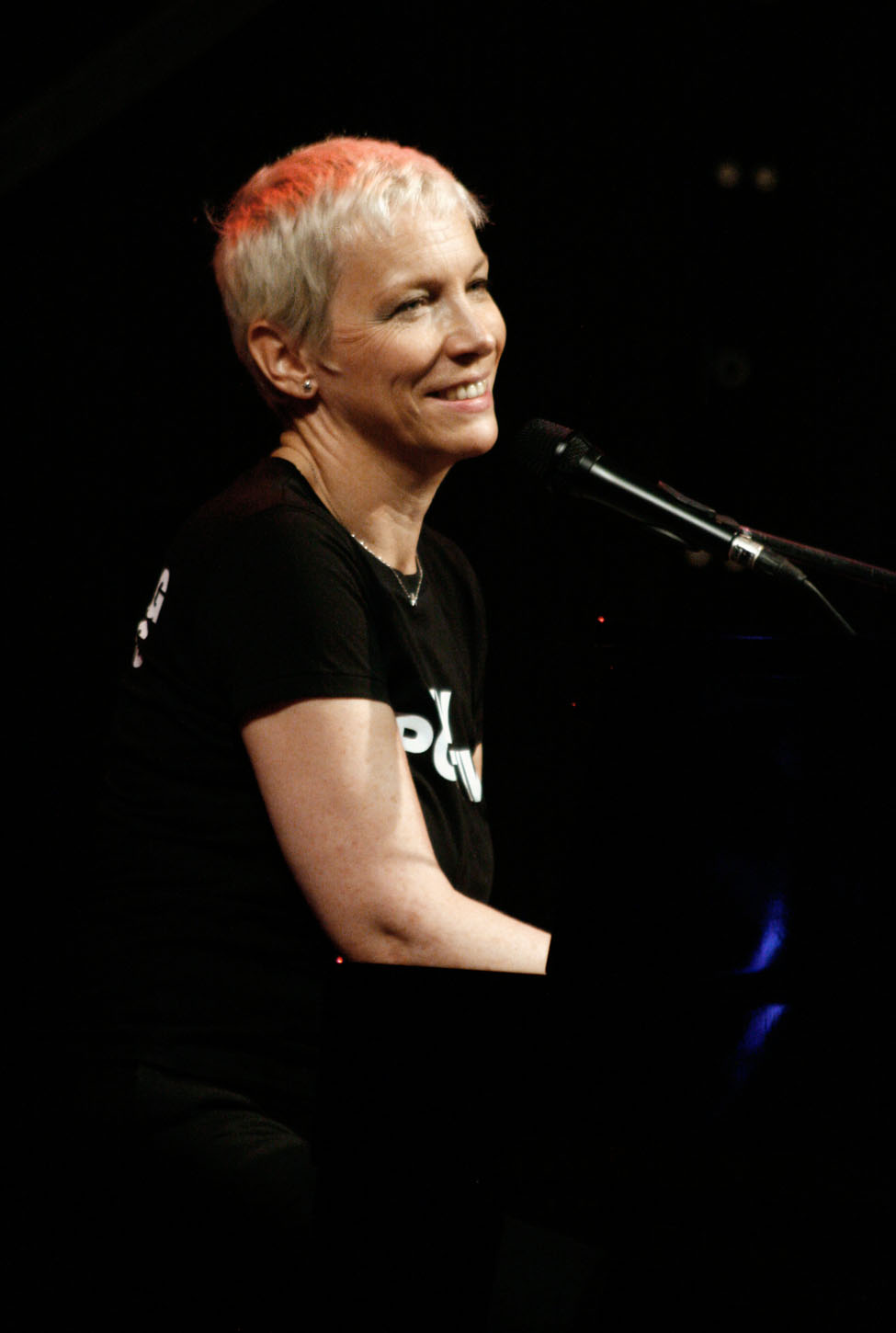
Swift credited Peter Gabriel (left) and Annie Lennox (right) as influences for 1989.

To realize her vision, Swift took inspirations from the experimental nature of synth-pop from the 1980s decade, when musicians abandoned the once-popular drums and guitar instrumentation for synthesizers, drum pads, and manipulated vocals. Annie Lennox and Peter Gabriel were formative influences: Swift was inspired by the former's "intense" ways of conveying thoughts and emotions and the latter's atmospheric synth-pop sounds. Naming her fifth studio album 1989 after her birth year, she both referenced the influence of 1980s synth-pop and signified a symbolic artistic rebirth.

Swift enlisted Max Martin and Shellback, who had produced "I Knew You Were Trouble", as key collaborators, crediting the former as co-executive producer for helping her create a coherent album and providing uncredited production credits on several tracks. Martin and Shellback produced seven tracks for 1989's standard edition and two additional tracks for its deluxe edition. Ryan Tedder, contacted by Swift via an iPhone voice memo, co-wrote and co-produced "Welcome to New York" and "I Know Places". He used a Juno-106 synthesizer to create four demos for the former, and Swift chose the first demo and reworked on it as the final version. For the latter, Swift played what she had written on piano and elaborated to Tedder the specific melody she wanted, and the two finished recording the track after one day.

"I Wish You Would"
1989 features influences of 1980s pop sounds. The snare drums on "I Wish You Would" (sampled) were inspired by Fine Young Cannibals' 1988 single "She Drives Me Crazy".

Jack Antonoff, who shared mutual interests in 1980s music, had worked with Swift on her new wave-influenced single "Sweeter than Fiction" (2013). His productions on two tracks for the standard edition and one for the deluxe edition are characterized by the Juno-6 synthesizer, which he thought to have both "a sadness" and "a glory". "Out of the Woods" and "I Wish You Would" started as instrumental tracks. Antonoff built the former on the Yamaha DX7 and Minimoog Voyager synthesizers and sent the track to Swift while she was on a plane, and she wrote the melody and lyrics based on it; the whole process took 30 minutes. The latter began as Antonoff's sampling of the snare drums on Fine Young Cannibals' "She Drives Me Crazy" (1988). He played the track to Swift on his iPhone and sent it to her to re-record, and the final track is a remix that retains the snare drum sounds.

Swift approached Imogen Heap to collaborate on "Clean". Swift had written the lyrics and melody, and Heap helped complete the track with her instruments and backing vocals. The recording completed after two takes in one day at Heap's Hideaway Studio in London. Nathan Chapman, who had produced Swift's country pop albums, co-produced "This Love", which is the only 1989 song that Swift wrote by herself. The standard edition contains 13 tracks, and the deluxe edition features three bonus songs. Recorded at studios in Sweden, the United States, and the United Kingdom, 1989 was mastered by Tom Coyne in two days at Sterling Sound Studio in New York City. Several tracks were completed by November 2013, and the album was finalized after the conclusion of the Red Tour in mid-2014. After listening to 1989, Big Machine's president Scott Borchetta asked Swift if she could include several country tracks with instruments such as fiddle, but she rejected his request. Borchetta agreed with her to not promote the album to country radio, which had been formative in driving Swift's career.

== Composition ==
=== Music ===
"Welcome to New York"
"Welcome to New York" exemplifies 1989's sound: its 1980s-inspired synth-pop production incorporates pulsing synthesizers, programmed beats, and multitracked vocals.

A homage to 1980s pop music, 1989 is a synth-pop album whose electronic arrangements incorporate synthesizers, programmed drum machines, and pulsating basslines, abandoning the acoustic textures that had defined Swift's past albums. The songs are characterized by mid-tempo rhythms and memorable melodies, hooks, and refrains, constituting a consistent palette that stays faithful to 1980s synth-pop without overt influences of contemporary, popular hip-hop or R&B. Several reviews opined that the album also incorporates 1980s styles of rock, namely pop rock, synth-rock, and new wave. In this regard, critics generally considered the music of 1989 old-fashioned and retro. (Note: Attributed to multiple reviews:) Carl Wilson, in his review for Slate, disagreed and argued that while Swift's 1980s framing of the album establishes the overall aesthetic, its musical influences can be traced back to the 1970s, 1990s, or 2000s decades.

In addition to the overall synth-pop palette, many tracks incorporate stylings that evoke retro or contemporary styles such as hip-hop, dance, and electronic dance music. "Style" incorporates elements of funk, 1970s disco, and R&B in its electric guitar riff and groove. The opening sounds of a manipulated tape recorder in "All You Had to Do Was Stay" resemble sound effects used in psychedelic music. The percussions, bass drums, and synthesizers of "Blank Space", "Shake It Off", "Bad Blood", "Wonderland", and "I Know Places" evoke hip-hop, with the lattermost track further evoking drum and bass, trap, and reggae with its build-up, breakbeats, and syncopated snare and bass drums. Elements of soft rock are demonstrated on "This Love", an atmospheric, slow-paced ballad absent of the heavily programmed percussions of other tracks; and "Clean", a minimalist track composed of sparse percussions and programmed keyboards.

Swift's vocals on 1989, mostly sung in her alto range, are electronically processed, an effect that she first used on Red's pop singles. Manipulated with multitracking, synthesizer tweaking, and looping, her vocals are blended with the electronic instrumentation to create a unified texture, particularly in "Welcome to New York", "Out of the Woods", and "Bad Blood". The musicologist James E. Perone wrote that the vocal processing evokes 1980s pop sounds as much as it does 21st century Auto-Tune effects, creating a retro but also contemporary listening experience. For Wilson and NPR's Ann Powers, this synthetic rendering is a stark contrast to the naturalistic vocals of country music, but it helps Swift expand her emotional delivery through her versatile timbre and varied expressions.

=== Lyrics and themes ===
In the past, I've written mostly about heartbreak or pain that was caused by someone else and felt by me. On this album, I'm writing about [...] looking back on a relationship and feeling a sense of pride even though it didn't work out, reminiscing on something that ended but you still feel good about it, falling in love with a city, falling in love with a feeling rather than a person. And I think there's actually sort of a realism to my new approach to relationships, which is a little more fatalistic than anything I used to think about them.

— Swift on 1989, NPR

1989 is primarily about lost love, a theme that had been familiar in Swift's songs, but it depicts her different mindset on it. While her past albums situate her narrators as victims of ill-fated romance with vindictive and antagonistic attitudes, 1989 explores failed relationships through wistful and nostalgic perspectives. Inspired by her disenchantment with a "happily ever after" romance, she became aware of the "gray areas" of real-life situations and realized she could feel content with a failed relationship. According to Swift, the 1989 songs altogether constitute a story line; its liner notes include 13 one-sentence "secret messages" for the songs, and they collectively narrate a past love that leaves Swift's narrator going through heartbreak, recovery, and self-discovery. (Note: The "secret messages" of Swift's songs are decoded by arranging certain capitalized letters in each song's lyrics, printed in the album booklet, in the order they appear to spell out a certain word or phrase.) Molly Lambert, in her review for Grantland, opined that the central narrative revolves around a strong yet fragile sexual and intimate connection, with murky distinctions between love and lust.

Expanding on Swift's autobiographical songwriting, the lyrics of 1989 were influenced by and contain references to her personal life. They address romantic regrets caused by bad decisions and irreversible pain, but Swift's narrator remains empowered and unwaveringly hopeful that things will work in her favor. Several reviewers opined that the songs showcased her jaded outlook on romance after the dramatic heartbreaks depicted in past albums, with Swift saying that she became more pragmatic. Sex and intimacy, which she had explored obliquely on Red, are more explicitly depicted here, particularly on "Style" and "Wildest Dreams". "Blank Space", "Style", "Shake It Off", and "All You Had to Do Was Stay" showcase self-assurance and self-awareness, while "I Wish You Would" and "How You Get the Girl" demonstrate her starry-eyed visions of a lasting romance. For Lambert, 1989 depicts a transformation in Swift's persona, "between her fairy-tale idealizations of love and her recently acquired cynicism".

Although Swift's lyrics retain the storytelling aspect that had been nurtured by her country music background, they show a strong influence of pop music songwriting: they are less detailed and more ambiguous, and contain more repetitions of the track titles to create memorable hooks. Perone argued that the lyrics were less biographical and more metaphorical, allowing for wider interpretations. According to the musicologist Nate Sloan, 1989 abandons the "Time-Shift paradigm" that had informed Swift's previous works. While her country songs tell stories with their verses detailing the different stages and final refrains detailing the resolutions, the 1989 songs have all of their refrains repeating the same phrases and use a "frozen-in-time song structure", symbolizing an emotional intensity lingering in the present without any progress or conclusion.

=== Songs ===
"Welcome to New York" is about forgetting past heartbreaks to reinvent oneself while enjoying the bright lights and new sounds of New York City; its synth-pop production incorporates pulsing synthesizers and programmed drum machines that create clapping-like rhythms. In "Blank Space", Swift satirizes her public image as a woman having multiple romantic attachments but failing to maintain any lasting relationship: the narrator is a seductive but emotionally unstable woman whose romantic flings end up in disasters. With a minimalist electropop sound, it features Swift speak-singing the verses and using her upper register in the refrains. "Style" is about an on-again, off-again relationship that the narrator cannot escape because she and her lover are "never out of style" akin to timeless fashion staples. Built on an electric guitar riff, "Style" evokes influences of both 1980s and contemporary styles, namely synth-pop, new wave, and outrun.

"Out of the Woods"
"Out of the Woods" combines loud, insistent drums, synthesizers, and layered vocals to describe a fragile relationship.

"Out of the Woods" details a fragile relationship that instills great anxiety; its bridge depicts a snowmobile accident as a metaphor for how the relationship ended: the ex-boyfriend hit the brakes and injured himself, leading to a hospital visit that required twenty stitches. Its insistent production is driven by loud, echoing drums, multitracked vocals, and undulating synthesizers that build up towards the conclusion. In "All You Had to Do Was Stay", inspired by Swift's dream that she shouted "stay" multiple times to an ex-boyfriend, her narrator determines to move on from a past relationship despite the ex-boyfriend wanting to reconcile with her, although she admits feelings of hurt, grief, and longing. The vocal hook includes repetitions of the word "stay" sung in Swift's high-pitched vocals. "Shake It Off" is about Swift's indifference to her detractors and their negative remarks, and its beat is driven by handclaps, a repeating Mellotron-based saxophone played by Shellback, and stomping sounds that Martin and Shellback created by banging their feet on a wooden floor.

In "I Wish You Would", Swift's narrator pines for an ex-boyfriend, hoping he knows that she would never forget him. The track incorporates an electric guitar riff, and its refrains include erupting synthesizers, snare drums, and layered vocals. "Bad Blood", with lyrics about a fallen friendship, was inspired by a fellow female musician who made Swift feel betrayed. Its hip-hop-influenced production features cheerleading-like chanting rhythms and booming drums. "Wildest Dreams" describes a powerful romantic and sexual connection that Swift's narrator knows will ultimately end; she pleads with her lover to remember her and their fond memories while it lasts. Its atmospheric synth-pop production incorporates a heartbeat-like rhythm, thick, insistent synthesizers and strings. Described by Swift as a "tutorial" for men who want to rekindle broken relationships, "How You Get the Girl" sees her narrator instructing an ex-boyfriend with how to win her heart back over acoustic guitar strums and beatboxing rhythms.

"This Love", a pensive ballad that started as a poem in Swift's journal, is about her letting go of a relationship that no longer served her, knowing that the timing was not right; it uses ocean imagery to describe a love affair that comes back and disappears like waves, and her vocals are multitracked to create a haunting atmosphere. In "I Know Places", which is instrumented by sparse piano, stuttering vocals, and drum-and-bass beats, the narrator vows to protect a fragile love, comparing herself and her partner to animals being hunted down. Swift was inspired to write the standard album's closing track "Clean" after spending two weeks in London and realizing that she no longer missed an ex-boyfriend who lived there. With a sparse, minimalist arrangement, the track details the narrator's journey towards recovery after a heartbreak: she compares getting over a broken relationship to an addiction that leaves her in deep pain, to the point that healing makes little sense, and after a destructive yet transformative torrential storm, the narrator becomes "finally clean".

The three bonus songs for 1989's deluxe edition have varied themes. "Wonderland" references Lewis Carroll's fantasy book Alice's Adventures in Wonderland (1865) to describe a dangerous, intense, and alluring romantic relationship that leaves the narrator falling "down the rabbit hole". While the couple fantasizes about staying in their "Wonderland" forever, this relationship's ending is foreshadowed by their curiosity and others' scrutiny on them. The aggressive bass drum instrumentation of "Wonderland" evokes hip-hop and alternative rock. Inspired by Antonoff and Lena Dunham's relationship, the ballad "You Are in Love" recounts the ups and downs of a stable relationship through mundane daily activities over a soft electropop production. "New Romantics", whose title references the New Romantic cultural movement of the 1970s and 1980s decades, finds Swift's narrator reclaiming her broken heart and celebrating the pain that she has endured with a euphoric new wave, synth-pop, and indie electronic sound.

== Artwork and packaging ==
Swift served as the creative director for 1989's packaging, which includes photographs taken with a Polaroid instant film camera, a photographic method popular in the 1980s decade. The photographic duo Lowfield shot over 400 Polaroid photographs, and they digitally mixed them to mimic those found in an old album. The cover is a portrait of Swift's face cut off at the eyes, which she thought to evoke a mysterious atmosphere that concealed "the emotional DNA of the album" because she did not want the audience to immediately identify whether 1989 was a "happy" or a "breakup" record. In the cover, she wears red lipstick and a lavender sweatshirt embroidered with flying seagulls. Her initials are written with black marker on the bottom left, and the title 1989 on the bottom right. Billboard in 2023 included the 1989 cover at number 50 in their list "100 Best Album Covers of All Time", deeming it one of Swift's most identifiable works.

Each CD copy of 1989 includes a packet, one of five available sets, of 13 random Polaroid photos, made up from 65 different photos. The pictures portray Swift in different settings such as backdrops of New York City and recording sessions with the producers. The photos are out-of-focus, off-framed, with a sepia-tinged treatment, and feature the 1989 songs' lyrics written with black marker on the bottom. Perone thought that this photo package appeared as though it were Swift's personal gift to album buyers. Polaroid's chief executive Scott Hardy reported that 1989 propelled a revival in instant film, especially among the hipster subculture who valued the "nostalgia and retro element of what [their] company stands for".

== Release ==
=== Marketing ===
Swift marketed 1989 as her first "official pop" album. With her label Big Machine, she implemented an extensive promotional campaign through product endorsements, media appearances, and fan engagements. Swift announced 1989 via a Yahoo live streaming sponsored by ABC News on August 18, 2014. She frequently posted on social media platforms to engage fans; based on their interactions with her posts, she selected the most engaged ones and invited them to "1989 Secret Sessions" album listening parties prior to its release. These listening sessions were also attended by journalists and critics selected by Swift, and they were held at her properties in Los Angeles, New York City, Nashville, Rhode Island, and London throughout September–October 2014.

Swift appeared on many terrestrial broadcast platforms to promote 1989: television talk shows (Jimmy Kimmel Live!, The Ellen DeGeneres Show, Late Show with David Letterman, Good Morning America, The Talk), awards ceremonies (2014 MTV Video Music Awards), and radio (NPR, American Top 40, SiriusXM Town Hall). Her product tie-ins included partnerships with Subway, Keds, and Diet Coke. Big Machine released "Shake It Off" to contemporary hit radio in the United States as the lead single from 1989 on August 18, 2014, and "Out of the Woods" and "Welcome to New York" for download via the iTunes Store as promotional singles on October 15 and 21. "Shake It Off" peaked at number one on the Billboard Hot 100 and set the record for the highest debuts on the Pop Songs and Adult Pop Songs charts.

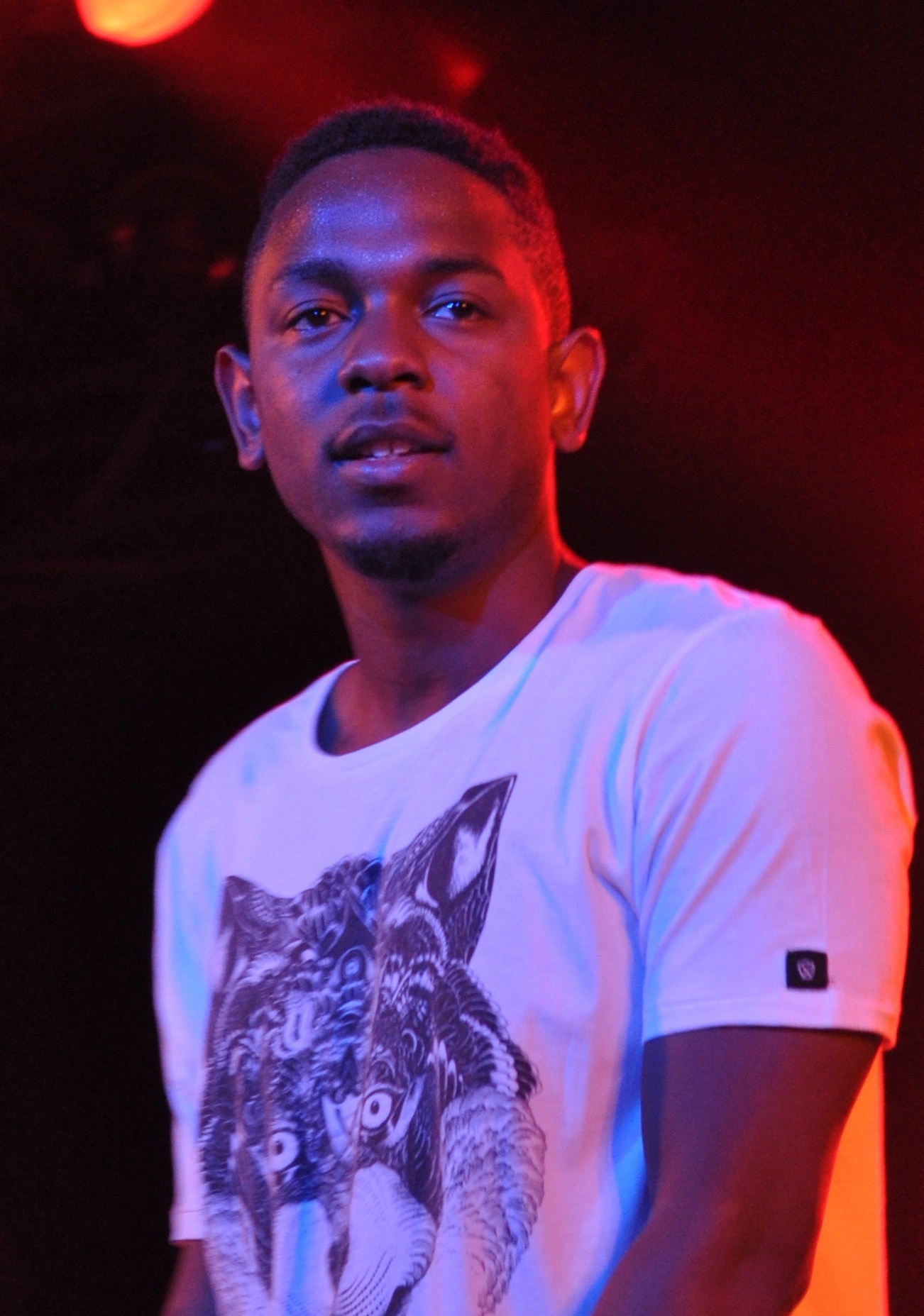
Kendrick Lamar featured on the single remix of "Bad Blood".

Throughout 2014–2015, 1989 was supported by four further singles, with two reaching number one on the Billboard Hot 100—"Blank Space" and "Bad Blood", and two peaking in the top 10—"Style" and "Wildest Dreams". The single release of "Bad Blood" was supported by a remix featuring Kendrick Lamar. "Out of the Woods" and "New Romantics" were released as the two last singles in 2016. All singles were accompanied by music videos that featured Swift's new persona and styles: whereas the videos for her country singles had incorporated linear narratives and everyday fashion, those for the 1989 singles featured fragmented storylines and elaborate mise-en-scène that evoke fantasy-like environments, Hollywood cinema productions, and lavish lifestyles.

There has been commentary on the effects of 1989's marketing. The popular culture academic Keith Nainby argued that the music videos created Swift's "pop" and "rarefied" persona that contrasted with the earnest, everyday, down-to-earth personae in her country music videos. Maryn Wilkinson, a scholar in media studies, described Swift's 1989 persona as "zany": she deliberately showcased that her "pop" persona was a construct of hard work, implying that her "real" persona existed beneath her "pop" performances in videos and interviews. In doing so, Swift reminded her audience that she still retained her authentic self from her country beginnings. Wilkinson considered Swift's "zany" persona a means for her to both abandon country for pop, and retain fans from her country days, while Randy Lewis of the Los Angeles Times thought that she did so via the intimate bonds with fans thanks to her social media usage and the "Secret Sessions".

=== Distribution and streaming ===
Big Machine Records released 1989 on October 27, 2014; the digital album was available for a discounted price via a Microsoft partnership. Big Machine released the deluxe edition on CD exclusively via Target stores in the United States. This edition includes three voice memos recorded on Swift's phone, containing her discussions of the songwriting process and unfinished demos for three songs: "I Know Places" (piano/vocal), "I Wish You Would" (track/vocal), and "Blank Space" (guitar/vocal). For Perone, these voice memos personalized 1989 by providing an insider's view of her creative process. According to Myles McNutt, a scholar in communications and the arts, Swift used the voice memos to claim authorship of 1989, defying pop music's "gendered hierarchy" which had seen a dominance of male songwriters and producers. While McNutt considered Swift's approach feminist, he argued that it was promotional rather than activist, and thus its impact on the music industry at large was limited.

On November 3, 2014, Big Machine removed Swift's discography from Spotify, the largest on-demand music streaming service at the time. Swift argued that their ad-supported, free service undermined the premium service that provided higher royalties for songwriters and artists. She had written an op-ed for The Wall Street Journal in July 2014, expressing her concerns over the decline of the album as an economic entity following the rise of free music streaming, and reinstated her stance in a November 2014 interview with Time. Big Machine kept 1989 only on paid, subscription-required streaming platforms like Rhapsody and Beats Music. This move prompted an industry-wide debate over the impact of streaming on declining record sales during the digital era and a response from Spotify's CEO Daniel Ek, who defended the platform's royalty model.

The deluxe edition bonus tracks were released onto the iTunes Store in February 2015. In an open letter published via Tumblr on June 21, 2015, Swift stated that 1989 would not be available on Apple Music, criticizing its non-payment of royalties to artists during their three-month free trial period. The following day, head of Apple Music Eddy Cue announced that they would reverse their initial decision and pay artists royalties during the free trial period, directly addressing Swift's open letter. Swift agreed to put 1989 on Apple Music when it launched on June 30 and she later appeared in commercials for the service. In June 2017, Big Machine reinstated Swift's catalogue on Spotify and all major streaming services, citing the milestone of the Recording Industry Association of America (RIAA) certifying 100 million song units across her discography.

=== Touring ===
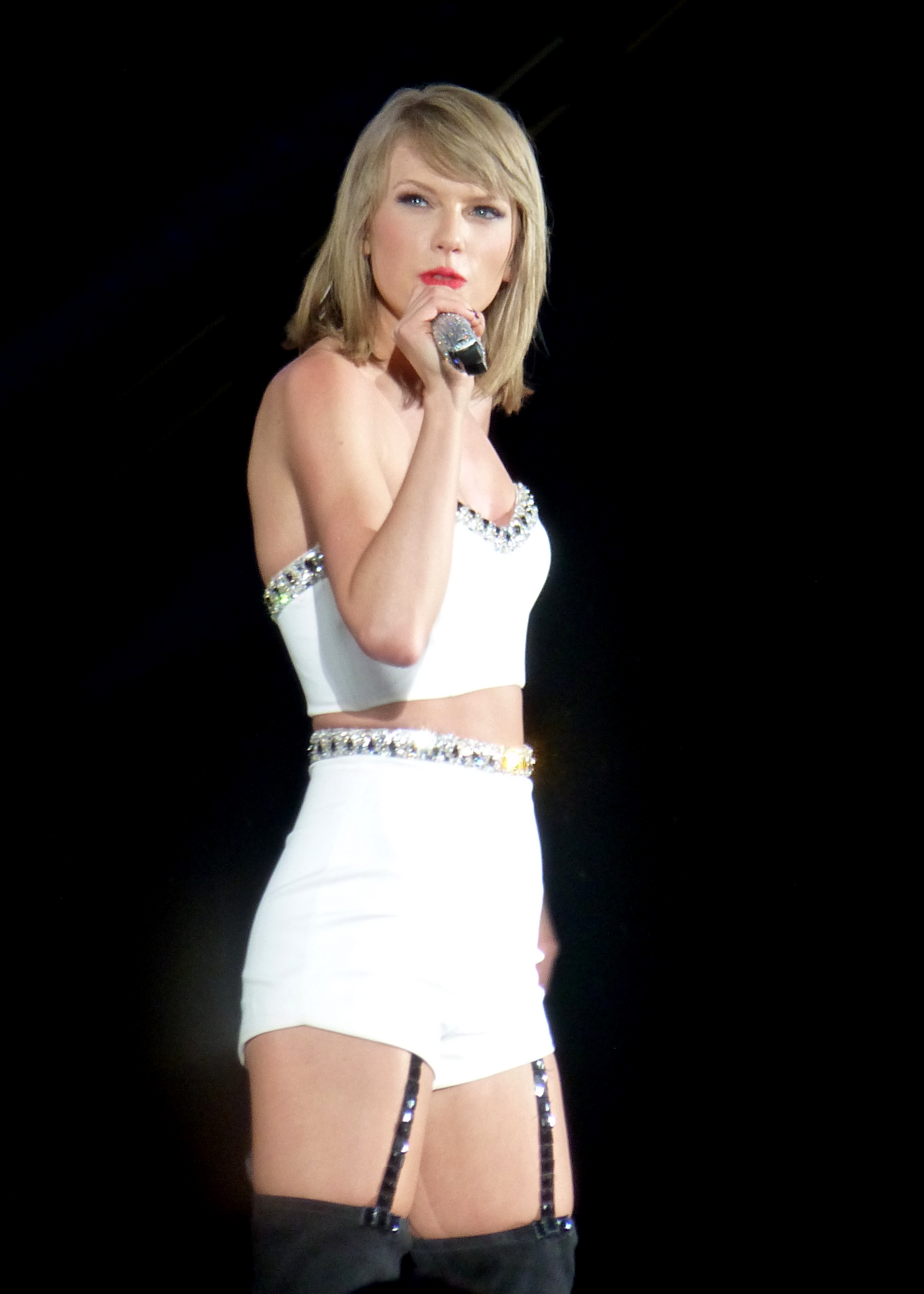
Swift on the 1989 World Tour, the highest-grossing tour of 2015

Swift announced the 1989 World Tour on November 3, 2014, via her Twitter account. Spanning 85 dates and visiting 53 cities, it kicked off on May 5, in Tokyo, Japan, and concluded on December 12, in Sydney, Australia. The 1989 World Tour was the highest-grossing tour of 2015, earning over $250 million at the box office. In North America alone, the tour grossed $181.5 million, breaking the records for the highest-grossing US tour by a woman and the highest-grossing US tour by any act, surpassing the Rolling Stones' record in 2005. A documentary and concert film, The 1989 World Tour Live, was released for streaming exclusively via Apple Music on December 20, 2015.

On various dates of the 1989 World Tour, Swift invited special guests on stage with her. While Swift had invited fellow musicians to perform with her on the Red Tour, the guest list of the 1989 World Tour was more random. There were 78 such guest stars; they were unannounced and included actors, singers, models, and athletes. A specific group of female celebrities, consisting of mostly singers and models, was referred to by the media as Swift's "squad". Kirsty Fairclough, an academic in the arts, considered the celebrity guest stars on the 1989 World Tour a means for Swift to showcase her star power and keep her name constantly in the news cycle, giving the impression of a self-centric and inauthentic pop star. Commenting on the female "squad", Fairclough said that it was a visual representation of Swift's newfound feminist identity, but its members of wealthy and conventionally attractive celebrities undermined the "underdog" relatability that she had curated during her career beginnings.

== Commercial performance ==
In the United States, record sales had declined sharply in the 2010s due to the rise of downloads and streaming, but Swift's albums had achieved strong sales: her previous two albums, Speak Now (2010) and Red (2012), each sold over one million copies within one week. 1989's sales were subject to projections by music-industry publications, considering her withdrawal from country music, which had been formative in driving her career, and free streaming services. During the week prior to the album's release, publications predicted that it would sell short of one million copies, with estimations from 600,000–750,000 to 800,000–900,000. After its release, Billboard closely monitored its sales and raised the first-week prediction from 900,000 to one million within 24 hours, 1.2 million within 48 hours, and 1.3 million after six days.

Through November 2, 2014, the album debuted at number one on the Billboard 200 with first-week sales of 1.287 million, according to data for the chart dated November 15, 2014. Swift became the first artist to have three albums each sell one million copies within the first week, and 1989 was the first 2014 album to sell one million. It spent 11 weeks at number one on the Billboard 200 and one full year in the top 10. With 6.215 million copies sold by the end of 2019, it was the third-best-selling album of the 2010s decade in the United States. As of May 2025, 1989 had accumulated 14.6 million album-equivalent units in the United States. The RIAA certified the album 14-times platinum in September 2025.

1989 reached number one on charts and was certified multi-platinum in Australia (eleven-times platinum), Canada (six-times platinum), Mexico (triple platinum + gold), New Zealand (eleven-times platinum), Norway (triple platinum), and the United Kingdom (six-times platinum). In other countries across the Americas, Europe, and Asia–Pacific, 1989 reached the top five on charts in Austria, Denmark, Germany, Italy, Portugal, Spain, Switzerland, Japan, and Brazil. It was certified platinum in France, Germany, Italy, Japan, Portugal, and Switzerland; (Note: References:) double diamond in Brazil; triple platinum in Austria, Denmark, Poland, and Singapore; (Note: References:) and four-times platinum in Belgium. In China, it had sold over one million units as of August 2019 to become one of the best-selling digital albums.

According to the International Federation of the Phonographic Industry, 1989 was the second-best-selling album of 2014 and third-best-selling of 2015. By November 2022, the album was Swift's best-selling worldwide, having sold 14 million copies. After Swift embarked on the Eras Tour, a career retrospective world tour, in March 2023, sales and streams of her discography resurged. 1989 reached new peaks on charts in Greece (number one), Austria (number four), and Sweden (number 17), and it appeared on new charts of Argentina (number one), Uruguay (number seven), and Iceland (number 25).

== Critical reception ==
Professional ratings
Aggregate scores
Source	Rating
AnyDecentMusic?	7.4/10
Metacritic	76/100
Review scores
Source	Rating
AllMusic	3.5/5 stars
The A.V. Club	B+
Cuepoint (Expert Witness)	A−
The Daily Telegraph	4/5 stars
The Guardian	4/5 stars
Los Angeles Times	2/4 stars
NME	7/10
Pitchfork	7.7/10
Rolling Stone	4/5 stars
Spin	7/10

Initial reviews of 1989 were generally positive, although not universally so. Based on reviews in mainstream publications, Metacritic assigns 1989 a weighted average score of 76 out of 100 based on 29 reviews, and AnyDecentMusic? gives the album a score of 7.4 out of 10 based on 28 reviews.

Positive reviews generally complimented Swift's songwriting, highlighting the multifaceted lyrics that explore lighthearted and bittersweet sentiments of failed romance and that various critics found mature and absent of the naivete portrayed in her past songs. Critics felt that compared to her previous albums, 1989 was more playful but still retained a deep emotional engagement. Pitchfork's Vrinda Jagoda deemed Swift's persona of 1989 more self-reliant and confident without dwelling too much on past pain, while Rolling Stone's Rob Sheffield characterized the album as a "deeply weird, feverishly emotional, wildly enthusiastic" record that explored her feelings to extremes.

Critics considered Swift's embrace of 1980s synth-pop experimental but were divided on its outcome. Many reviews praised the production as catchy; Robert Christgau thought that the "treated hooks and doctored vocals" made Swift sound "at home" despite her intention to abandon her old sound. Powers contended that the electronic processing of Swift's vocals brought forth new shades of expressions and emotions, resulting in a pleasurable listening experience. Jon Caramanica of The New York Times and Alexis Petridis of The Guardian lauded 1989 as a faithful homage to 1980s pop, elevating Swift's status as a timeless musician ahead of her peers; the latter attributed this success to her artistic vision despite the multiple collaborators and producers.

Multiple reviews otherwise lamented that the synth-based musical approach eroded Swift's songwriting authenticity, arguing that its "capitalist" nature contrasted with country music's supposedly authentic values. Several reviews criticized the heavy synth production that undermined the lyrical details and came off as generic. In his review for Grantland, Steven Hyden contended that 1989 showcased consistent songcraft but felt the 1980s synth-pop palette repetitive and made Swift lose her distinctive voice. AllMusic's Stephen Thomas Erlewine summed up the album as "a sparkling soundtrack to an aspirational lifestyle" desperate to cater to mainstream tastes. Kitty Empire of The Observer thought that 1989 played to Swift's strengths as a songwriter but was not as "unequivocally great" as her single "I Knew You Were Trouble".

== Awards and rankings ==
The most-awarded pop album of all time, 1989 won Album of the Year and Best Pop Vocal Album at the 2016 Grammy Awards. Swift became the first female solo artist to win Album of the Year twice, following Fearless (2008) in 2010. 1989 also won Favorite Pop/Rock Album at the 2015 American Music Awards, Album of the Year (Western) at the 2015 Japan Gold Disc Awards, and Album of the Year at the 2016 iHeartRadio Music Awards. It received nominations for Best International Pop/Rock Album at the 2015 Echo Music Prize in Germany, International Album of the Year at the 2015 Juno Awards in Canada, and Best International Album at the 2015 Los Premios 40 Principales in Spain.

Many publications ranked 1989 among the best albums of 2014. Those who placed the album within their top 10 included Billboard (1st), Drowned in Sound (3rd), American Songwriter (4th), Time (4th), The Daily Telegraph (5th), The Music (5th), Complex (8th), and Rolling Stone (10th). Other publications that featured 1989 in their lists were The Guardian, The A.V. Club, PopMatters, Pitchfork, and MusicOMH. The album ranked 7th on The Village Voice's 2014 Pazz & Jop mass critics' poll and was featured in individual critics' lists by Brian Mansfield for USA Today (1st), Ken Tucker for NPR (3rd), and Jon Caramanica for The New York Times (7th).

== Legacy ==
=== Cultural influence ===
1989 transformed Swift's image from a country singer to a pop icon, a status that has endured into the 2020s. It was the second album after Katy Perry's Teenage Dream (2010) to have at least five top-10 singles on the Billboard Hot 100 in the 2010s decade. With Fearless and 1989, Swift became the second woman after Janet Jackson to have two albums each have at least five top-10 hits. Its singles received heavy rotation on United States radio airplay for more than 1.5 years during 2014–2016, which Billboard described as a rare "cultural omnipresence" for a 2010s album. The widespread popularity of 1989 put Swift "at the cutting edge of postmillennial pop", wrote Shaun Cullen, a scholar in the humanities. Its synth-pop sound laid the musical groundwork for her subsequent albums, namely Reputation (2017), Lover (2019), Midnights (2022), and The Tortured Poets Department (2024). Antonoff worked with Swift on those albums and credited her as the first person to recognize him as a producer, leading to his collaborations with other artists in mainstream pop.

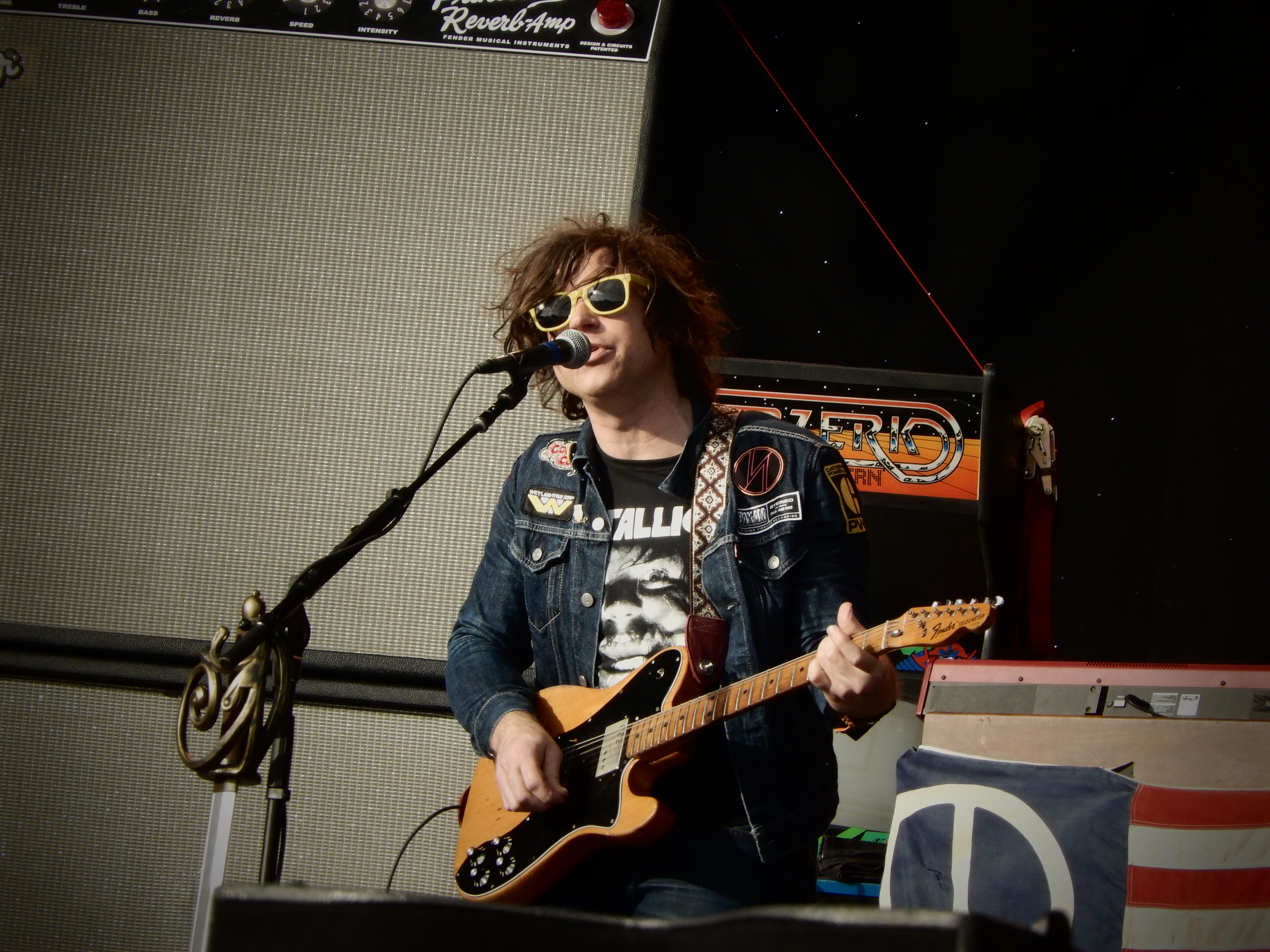
Ryan Adams (pictured) released his track-by-track cover of 1989 in September 2015.

Many journalists credited 1989 with inspiring other artists to experiment with new sounds without being confined to a specific genre. Artists who cited 1989 as an influence included the singer-songwriter Conan Gray, the actor and musician Jared Leto, and the pop band Vamps, who were inspired by the album to compose Wake Up (2015). Jennifer Kaytin Robinson, an actress and director, cited 1989 as an inspiration for her feature film directorial debut, Someone Great (2019). The singer-songwriter Ryan Adams released his track-by-track cover album of 1989 in September 2015. Finding it a "joyful" record, he listened to the album frequently to cope with his divorce from Mandy Moore in late 2014. In his rendition, Adams incorporated acoustic arrangements of strings and percussion, embracing styles of alternative country and indie rock. Swift was delighted with Adams' cover and told him, "What you did with my album was like actors changing emphasis."

Swift's success was accompanied by heightened media scrutiny of her public image. During the promotion of 1989, she identified as a feminist after having avoided discussing this issue in the past. Her public appearances with her "squad" and the routinely documented 1989 World Tour led to media overexposure, and the public grew weary of her public persona, which appeared too calculated and aspirational, as opposed to the down-to-earth image she had curated in country music. In 2015–2016, Swift's online disputes with other musicians like Nicki Minaj and Kanye West blemished her carefully curated image, feminist identity, and sense of authenticity. (Note: Swift and West had been embroiled in a controversy at the 2009 MTV Video Music Awards, where West interrupted Swift's acceptance speech for Best Female Video. Their adversary re-emerged when West released his 2016 single "Famous", in which he incorporated a lyric referencing Swift. West claimed that he had asked for Swift's approval, which she objected to.) Swift announced a prolonged hiatus in 2016 thinking that "people might need a break from [her]". 1989's follow-up album, Reputation, was influenced by the media commotion surrounding her celebrity.

=== Critical reappraisal ===
After Adams released his 1989 cover in 2015, Pitchfork attracted criticism from several fellow publications when it reviewed his rendition but not Swift's. Multiple reviews praised Adams for transforming Swift's 1989 from a trivial or cheesy album to a more serious and authentic one. The philosopher Alison Stone argued that this critical reaction was a result of both rockism and sexism. According to Stone, music journalism assumed that Swift's pop music had its "feminine" qualities of "superficiality and triviality", which it deemed inferior to Adams's indie-rock singer-songwriter identity that supposedly embodied authenticity and meaningfulness. Stone and Slate's Forrest Wickman added that this was due to rock-music critics' preference of male-oriented, "edgy" musicians to "mainstream" acts, while Vox's Emily St. James argued that Swift's 1989 already embraced complex emotions like sadness and anger underneath its upbeat pop sounds, and that the emphasis on Adams's "authenticity" and "sincerity" was a result of music criticism's favoritism of certain genres like rock or acoustic singer-songwriter.

Retrospective reviews have considered 1989 an artistically accomplished album. Many have deemed it a masterpiece and a modern classic, upholding its 1980s synth-pop authenticity as an attribute of its timeless and nostalgic qualities. (Note: Attributed to multiple references:) According to The Ringer's Nora Princiotti, by deliberately avoiding popular musical styles of the day, Swift situated 1989 within the history of pop music itself, on par with classic pop albums like Michael Jackson's Thriller (1982) and the Beatles' Abbey Road (1969). Many publications ranked 1989 among their best albums of the 2010s decade, with The A.V. Club and Slant Magazine placing it in their top 10. It was featured in the top 50 by Billboard, Consequence, NME, Paste, Rolling Stone, and Uproxx. Consequence additionally ranked it sixth on their list of the best 2010s-decade pop albums, and Variety's Chris Willman ranked it first on his personal list. On Pitchfork's readers' poll for the 2010s decade, it ranked 44th.

Several publications ranked 1989 among their best albums of the 21st century, with Billboard placing it at number 4, Rolling Stone at number 72, Paste at number 75, and The Guardian at number 89. British GQ listed it among the most essential pop albums of the 21st century. The Times's Ed Potton dubbed 1989 the "album of the century", and The Guardian's Ian Gormely wrote that it made Swift the catalyst for poptimism—a critical reassessment of "mainstream" pop music that had been largely dismissed by "indie" music audiences. 1989 has been placed first in rankings of Swift's discography by NME and The Irish Times, and second by the Alternative Press, Spin, Slant Magazine, and the Star Tribune. 1989 placed at number 39 on Consequence's list "100 Greatest Albums of All Time" (2022), number 46 on The Daily Telegraph's list "50 Greatest Albums of All Time" (2025), and number 393 on Rolling Stone's 2023 revision of the "500 Greatest Albums of All Time". In 2026, 1989 was selected by the Library of Congress for preservation in the National Recording Registry as "culturally, historically, or aesthetically significant".

=== Re-recording ===
In November 2020, after a dispute over the ownership of Swift's back catalog, she began re-recording her first six studio albums that had been released by Big Machine. By re-recording them, Swift gained full ownership of the masters, which gave her full authorization to use her music for commercial purposes and therefore substituted for the Big Machine-owned masters. Swift released the re-recording of 1989, 1989 (Taylor's Version), on October 27, 2023, nine years after the original release of 1989. 1989 (Taylor's Version)'s standard track list contains re-recorded versions of all tracks on the deluxe 1989 edition and five previously unreleased "From the Vault" tracks. After the announcement of 1989 (Taylor's Version), the original album re-entered the top 10 of the Billboard 200 chart dated August 26, 2023. The ownership of the original 1989 master was sold back to Swift on May 30, 2025, along with the masters of the other five albums.

== Track listing ==
Standard edition
No.	Title	Writer(s)	Producer(s)	Length
1.	"Welcome to New York"	Taylor Swift; Ryan Tedder	Swift; Tedder; Noel Zancanella	3:32
2.	"Blank Space"	Swift; Max Martin; Shellback	Martin; Shellback	3:51
3.	"Style"	Swift; Martin; Shellback; Ali Payami	Martin; Shellback; Payami	3:51
4.	"Out of the Woods"	Swift; Jack Antonoff	Swift; Antonoff; Martin^{[a]}	3:55
5.	"All You Had to Do Was Stay"	Swift; Martin	Martin; Shellback; Mattman & Robin	3:13
6.	"Shake It Off"	Swift; Martin; Shellback	Martin; Shellback	3:39
7.	"I Wish You Would"	Swift; Antonoff	Swift; Antonoff; Martin^{[a]}; Greg Kurstin^{[b]}	3:27
8.	"Bad Blood"	Swift; Martin; Shellback	Martin; Shellback	3:31
9.	"Wildest Dreams"	Swift; Martin; Shellback	Martin; Shellback	3:40
10.	"How You Get the Girl"	Swift; Martin; Shellback	Martin; Shellback	4:07
11.	"This Love"	Swift	Swift; Nathan Chapman	4:10
12.	"I Know Places"	Swift; Tedder	Swift; Tedder; Zancanella	3:15
13.	"Clean"	Swift; Imogen Heap	Swift; Heap	4:30
Total length:				48:41

Deluxe edition
No.	Title	Writer(s)	Producer(s)	Length
14.	"Wonderland"	Swift; Martin; Shellback	Martin; Shellback	4:05
15.	"You Are in Love"	Swift; Antonoff	Swift; Antonoff	4:27
16.	"New Romantics"	Swift; Martin; Shellback	Martin; Shellback	3:50
Total length:				60:23

Voice memo edition
No.	Title	Writer(s)	Producer(s)	Length
17.	"I Know Places" (piano/vocal voice memo)	Swift; Tedder	Swift	3:36
18.	"I Wish You Would" (track/vocal voice memo)	Swift; Antonoff	Swift	1:47
19.	"Blank Space" (guitar/vocal voice memo)	Swift; Martin; Shellback	Swift	2:11
Total length:				68:37

=== Notes ===
- ^{^[a]} signifies a vocal producer
- ^{^[b]} signifies an additional producer
- "You Are in Love" is excluded from the Canadian deluxe edition.

== Personnel ==
Production

- Taylor Swift – writer, producer, executive producer
- Max Martin – vocal production, producer, writer, programming, executive producer
- Shellback – producer, writer, programming
- Imogen Heap – producer, writer, recording programming
- Jack Antonoff – writer, producer
- Ryan Tedder – producer, recording, writer, additional programming
- Ali Payami – writer, producer, programming
- Noel Zancanella – producer, additional programming
- Nathan Chapman – producer, recording
- Jason Campbell – production coordinator
- Mattman & Robin – producer, programming
- Greg Kurstin – additional production
- Michael Ilbert – recording
- Smith Carlson – recording
- Laura Sisk – recording
- Sam Holland – recording
- Matthew Tryba – assistant recording
- Eric Eylands – assistant recording
- Brendan Morawski – assistant recording
- Cory Bice – assistant recording
- Serban Ghenea – mixing
- John Hanes – engineered for mix
- Peter Carlsson – Pro Tools engineer
- Tom Coyne – mastering

Instruments

- Taylor Swift – heartbeat, claps, shouts, acoustic guitar, lead vocals, background vocals
- Max Martin – keyboard, piano, claps, shouts, background vocals
- Shellback – acoustic guitar, electric guitar, bass, keyboard, percussion, shouts, stomps, additional guitars, guitar, knees, noise, claps, drums, background vocals
- Imogen Heap – vibraphone, drums, mbira, percussion, keyboards, background vocals
- Jack Antonoff – acoustic guitar, electric guitar, keyboards, bass, drums, background vocals
- Ryan Tedder – piano, Juno, acoustic guitar, electric guitar, drum programming, additional synth, background vocals
- Niklas Ljungfelt – guitar
- Jonas Thander – saxophone
- Jonas Lindeborg – trumpet
- Magnus Wiklund – trombone
- Ali Payami – keyboards
- Noel Zancanella – drum programming, synthesizer, bass, additional synth
- Nathan Chapman – electric guitar, bass, keyboards, drums
- Mattman & Robin – drums, guitar, bass, keyboard, percussion
- Greg Kurstin – keyboards

Art

- Taylor Swift – creative director
- Sarah Barlow – photography
- Stephen Schofield – photography
- Josh & Bethany Newman – art direction
- Austin Hale – design
- Amy Fucci – design
- Joseph Cassell – wardrobe stylist

== Charts ==
=== Weekly charts ===
2014–2015 weekly chart performance
Chart (2014–2015)	Peak position
Australian Albums (ARIA)	1
Austrian Albums (Ö3 Austria)	5
Belgian Albums (Ultratop Flanders)	1
Belgian Albums (Ultratop Wallonia)	7
Brazilian Albums (ABPD)	3
Canadian Albums (Billboard)	1
Croatian International Albums (HDU)	1
Czech Albums (ČNS IFPI)	17
Danish Albums (Hitlisten)	2
Dutch Albums (Album Top 100)	1
Finnish Albums (Suomen virallinen lista)	10
French Albums (SNEP)	9
German Albums (Offizielle Top 100)	4
Greek Albums (IFPI)	11
Hungarian Albums (MAHASZ)	22
Irish Albums (IRMA)	1
Italian Albums (FIMI)	5
Japanese Albums (Oricon)	3
Japanese Hot Albums (Billboard Japan)	6
Mexican Albums (AMPROFON)	1
New Zealand Albums (RMNZ)	1
Norwegian Albums (VG-lista)	1
Polish Albums (ZPAV)	17
Portuguese Albums (AFP)	3
Scottish Albums (OCC)	1
South African Albums (RISA)	7
South Korean Albums (Circle)	10
South Korean International Albums (Circle)	2
Spanish Albums (Promusicae)	4
Swedish Albums (Sverigetopplistan)	23
Swiss Albums (Schweizer Hitparade)	3
UK Albums (Official Charts)	1
US Billboard 200	1

2017 weekly chart performance
Chart (2017)	Peak position
Latvian Albums (LaIPA)	94

2021–2023 weekly chart performance
Chart (2021–2023)	Peak position
Argentine Albums (CAPIF)	1
Austrian Albums (Ö3 Austria)	4
Greek Albums (IFPI)	1
Icelandic Albums (Tónlistinn)	25
Swedish Albums (Sverigetopplistan)	17
Swiss Albums (Schweizer Hitparade)	1
Uruguayan Albums (CUD)	7
US Independent Albums (Billboard)	2

=== Year-end charts ===
2014 year-end charts
Chart (2014)	Position
Argentine Albums (CAPIF)	9
Australian Albums (ARIA)	2
Belgian Albums (Ultratop Flanders)	71
Belgian Albums (Ultratop Wallonia)	198
Canadian Albums (Billboard)	2
Dutch Albums (Album Top 100)	82
French Albums (SNEP)	160
German Albums (Offizielle Top 100)	71
Irish Albums (IRMA)	7
Japanese Albums (Oricon)	34
Mexican Albums (AMPROFON)	28
New Zealand Albums (RMNZ)	3
South Korean International Albums (Gaon)	25
Swiss Albums (Schweizer Hitparade)	87
UK Albums (OCC)	11
US Billboard 200	3

2015 year-end charts for
Chart (2015)	Position
Australian Albums (ARIA)	3
Austrian Albums (Ö3 Austria)	47
Belgian Albums (Ultratop Flanders)	33
Belgian Albums (Ultratop Wallonia)	125
Canadian Albums (Billboard)	1
Croatian Foreign Albums (HDU)	6
Dutch Albums (Album Top 100)	35
French Albums (SNEP)	82
German Albums (Offizielle Top 100)	56
Hungarian Albums & Compilations (MAHASZ)	69
Irish Albums (IRMA)	7
Japanese Albums (Billboard Japan)	15
Japanese Albums (Oricon)	30
Mexican Albums (AMPROFON)	20
New Zealand Albums (RMNZ)	7
South Korean International Albums (Gaon)	22
Spanish Albums (PROMUSICAE)	56
Swiss Albums (Schweizer Hitparade)	40
UK Albums (OCC)	6
US Billboard 200	1

2016 year-end charts
Chart (2016)	Position
Australian Albums (ARIA)	17
Belgian Albums (Ultratop Flanders)	94
Canadian Albums (Billboard)	17
Japanese Albums (Billboard Japan)	39
New Zealand Albums (RMNZ)	19
South Korean International Albums (Gaon)	36
UK Albums (OCC)	44
US Billboard 200	17

2017 year-end charts
Chart (2017)	Position
Australian Albums (ARIA)	32
Norwegian Albums (VG-lista)	71
South Korean International Albums (Gaon)	89
US Billboard 200	101

2018 year-end charts
Chart (2018)	Position
Australian Albums (ARIA)	36
US Billboard 200	82

2019 year-end charts
Chart (2019)	Position
Australian Albums (ARIA)	46
US Billboard 200	116

2020 year-end charts
Chart (2020)	Position
Australian Albums (ARIA)	44
Belgian Albums (Ultratop Flanders)	166
UK Albums (OCC)	97
US Billboard 200	105
US Independent Albums (Billboard)	36

2021 year-end charts
Chart (2021)	Position
Australian Albums (ARIA)	27
Belgian Albums (Ultratop Flanders)	102
Irish Albums (IRMA)	30
UK Albums (OCC)	59
US Billboard 200	88
US Independent Albums (Billboard)	10

2022 year-end charts
Chart (2022)	Position
Australian Albums (ARIA)	16
Austrian Albums (Ö3 Austria)	75
Belgian Albums (Ultratop Flanders)	57
Canadian Albums (Billboard)	45
Danish Albums (Hitlisten)	100
Dutch Albums (Album Top 100)	90
UK Albums (OCC)	33
US Billboard 200	75
US Independent Albums (Billboard)	8

2023 year-end charts
Chart (2023)	Position
Australian Albums (ARIA)	9
Austrian Albums (Ö3 Austria)	12
Belgian Albums (Ultratop Flanders)	15
Belgian Albums (Ultratop Wallonia)	132
Canadian Albums (Billboard)	14
Danish Albums (Hitlisten)	44
Dutch Albums (Album Top 100)	21
German Albums (Offizielle Top 100)	39
Hungarian Albums (MAHASZ)	56
Icelandic Albums (Tónlistinn)	80
New Zealand Albums (RMNZ)	7
Portuguese Albums (AFP)	70
Swedish Albums (Sverigetopplistan)	40
Swiss Albums (Schweizer Hitparade)	4
UK Albums (OCC)	12
US Billboard 200	16
US Independent Albums (Billboard)	2

2024 year-end charts
Chart (2024)	Position
Australian Albums (ARIA)	68
Belgian Albums (Ultratop Flanders)	92
Portuguese Albums (AFP)	77
Swiss Albums (Schweizer Hitparade)	7
UK Albums (OCC)	75
US Billboard 200	83
US Independent Albums (Billboard)	11

2025 year-end charts
Chart (2025)	Position
Belgian Albums (Ultratop Flanders)	146
US Billboard 200	197
US Independent Albums (Billboard)	23

=== Decade-end charts ===
2010s decade-end charts
Chart (2010s)	Position
Australian Albums (ARIA)	8
Canadian Albums (Billboard)	5
UK Albums (OCC)	25
US Billboard 200	2

=== All-time charts ===
All-time charts
Chart	Position
Irish Female Albums (IRMA) (Note: Compiled by the Official Charts Company as of March 2019)	36
US Billboard 200 (Note: Complied by Billboard for albums 1963–2015)	64
US Billboard 200 – Women (Note: Compiled by Billboard for albums 1963–2017)	5

== Certifications and sales ==
Certifications with pure sales where available
Region	Certification	Certified units/sales
Australia (ARIA)	11× Platinum	770,000^{‡}
Austria (IFPI Austria)	3× Platinum	45,000^{*}
Belgium (BRMA)	4× Platinum	120,000^{‡}
Brazil (Pro-Música Brasil)	2× Diamond	320,000^{‡}
Brazil (Pro-Música Brasil) "Big Machine Radio Release Special"	2× Diamond	500,000^{‡}
Canada (Music Canada)	6× Platinum	542,000 (Note: Canadian sales for 1989 as of January 2020)
Denmark (IFPI Danmark)	3× Platinum	60,000^{‡}
France (SNEP)	Platinum	100,000^{‡}
Germany (BVMI)	Platinum	200,000^{‡}
Italy (FIMI)	Platinum	50,000^{‡}
Japan (RIAJ)	Platinum	250,000^{^}
Mexico (AMPROFON)	3× Platinum+Gold	210,000^{^}
Netherlands (NVPI)	Gold	20,000^{^}
New Zealand (RMNZ)	11× Platinum	165,000^{‡}
Norway (IFPI Norway)	3× Platinum	60,000^{‡}
Poland (ZPAV)	3× Platinum	60,000^{‡}
Portugal (AFP)	Platinum	7,000^{‡}
Singapore (RIAS)	3× Platinum	30,000^{*}
Spain (Promusicae)	Gold	20,000^{‡}
Sweden (GLF)	Gold	20,000^{‡}
Switzerland (IFPI Switzerland)	Platinum	20,000^{‡}
United Kingdom (BPI)	6× Platinum	1,800,000^{‡}
United States (RIAA)	14× Platinum	6,472,000 (Note: US sales for 1989 as of January 2024)
^{*} Sales figures based on certification alone.^{^} Shipments figures based on certification alone.^{‡} Sales+streaming figures based on certification alone.

== See also ==
- List of Billboard 200 number-one albums of 2014
- List of Billboard 200 number-one albums of 2015
- List of UK Albums Chart number ones of the 2010s
- List of UK Album Downloads Chart number ones of the 2010s
- List of best-selling albums in Australia
- List of best-selling albums in China
- List of best-selling albums in the United States
  - By year
  - In the Nielsen SoundScan era
- List of best-selling albums of the 2010s in the United Kingdom
- List of best-selling albums of the 21st century
- List of best-selling albums by women
- Lists of fastest-selling albums
- List of albums which have spent the most weeks on the UK Albums Chart
