= The 1989 World Tour =

2015 concert tour by Taylor Swift

- Tour by Taylor Swift
- Promotional poster for the tour
- Location: Japan; United States; Germany; Netherlands; United Kingdom; Ireland; Canada; Singapore; China; Australia
- Associated album: 1989
- Start date: May 5, 2015
- End date: December 12, 2015
- No. of shows: 85
- Supporting acts: James Bay; Haim; Vance Joy; Shawn Mendes
- Attendance: 2.28 million
- Box office: $250.7 million ($340.52 million in 2025 dollars)

Taylor Swift concert chronology
- The Red Tour (2013–2014); The 1989 World Tour (2015); Reputation Stadium Tour (2018)

The 1989 World Tour was the fourth concert tour by the American singer-songwriter Taylor Swift, in support of her fifth studio album, 1989 (2014). It began in Tokyo, Japan, on May 5, 2015, and concluded in Melbourne, Australia, on December 12, 2015. Spanning 85 shows, Swift announced the tour's first dates in North America, Europe, Japan and Oceania in November and December 2014, announced additional dates for Singapore and China in June 2015, and a final announcement of the third show in Melbourne was made the following month.

The tour took seven months to plan and three months to rehearse. As with her previous tours, Swift was highly involved in the 1989 World Tour's planning and stage design. She aimed to create an intimate experience for concertgoers, which she found challenging for shows held in stadiums. Most songs on the set list were from 1989; additional songs from Swift's older albums were reinterpreted with a more synth-oriented production to align with 1989's soundscape. Each night of the tour, she performed one "surprise song" from her back catalog. For many of the shows, Swift invited special guests onstage with her, including musicians, actors, athletes, and models, whom the media called her "squad".

The world's highest-grossing tour of 2015, the 1989 World Tour sold over 2.278 million tickets and grossed over $250.7 million. It was acclaimed by critics, who praised Swift's stage presence and connection with the audience. Meanwhile, her appearances with an array of special guests attracted commentary regarding her new image as a pop star—having previously been known as a country singer-songwriter—and the sense of authenticity that she had maintained. On December 20, 2015, Swift released the concert film The 1989 World Tour Live in partnership with Apple Music. Filmed at the November 28, 2015 show at ANZ Stadium in Sydney, Australia, the film features additional behind-the-scenes footage of special guests from other shows throughout North America and Europe.

== Background and development ==
Swift released her fifth studio album 1989 on October 27, 2014. The synth-pop album was her first to be marketed as pop music, departing from her image as a country artist. It was a commercial success, selling over one million copies within its first week of release in the United States. On November 3, 2014, via her Twitter account, Swift announced the first details of her world tour in support of 1989. Australian singer Vance Joy was announced as an opening act, and the ticket sale for the North American leg was confirmed for November 14.

In a November 2014 interview with Time magazine, Swift said that the set list would primarily consist of songs from 1989. She included new versions of songs from her older catalog to maintain the cohesive, synth-heavy production of 1989 while also keeping the "live feel" of her performances. Swift, as always, was heavily involved in the tour's planning and production design. She acknowledged the challenge of playing in stadiums, expressing her goal for "those people in the very top row [to] feel like they got an intimate, personal experience". In an interview with KIIS-FM in December 2014, she revealed that she knew what the stage would look like, as well as knowing that "all the fans seem to be saying that they really don't want any song [from 1989] left off the setlist".

Swift first announced the North American and European dates in November 2014. The tour was set to kick off in Bossier City, Louisiana on May 20, 2015, and conclude in Tampa, Florida on October 31, 2015. Additional shows were added across the U.S., Canada, England, Scotland, Germany, and the Netherlands. One month after announcing the first dates, Swift added further shows in Japan, and Australia. The opening show of the tour would be in Japan in May 2015, and the shows in Australia would take place in November and December 2015. In June 2015, Swift announced more shows in China and Singapore in November 2015. The following month, Swift announced a third show in Melbourne, Australia, which would serve as the closing show of the 1989 World Tour on December 12, 2015. Opening acts were Vance Joy, Shawn Mendes, Haim, and James Bay.

The tour required seven months of planning and three months of music rehearsals, including four weeks of stage rehearsals and 10 days of two-a-day dress rehearsals. Swift traveled for the tour with 26 semi-trailer trucks and 11 buses carrying 146 people from city to city. Additionally, about 125 to 150 people were hired in each city to help with the load-in and stage setup, which took between six and eight hours for arenas and an additional day in stadiums. Swift chose two designs for the trucks' vinyl wrap, with 13 trucks per design. Concertgoers were given light-up bracelets that were programmed to change color throughout the show, a practice that was later implemented in Swift's Reputation Stadium Tour (2018) and the Eras Tour (2023).

== Concert synopsis ==
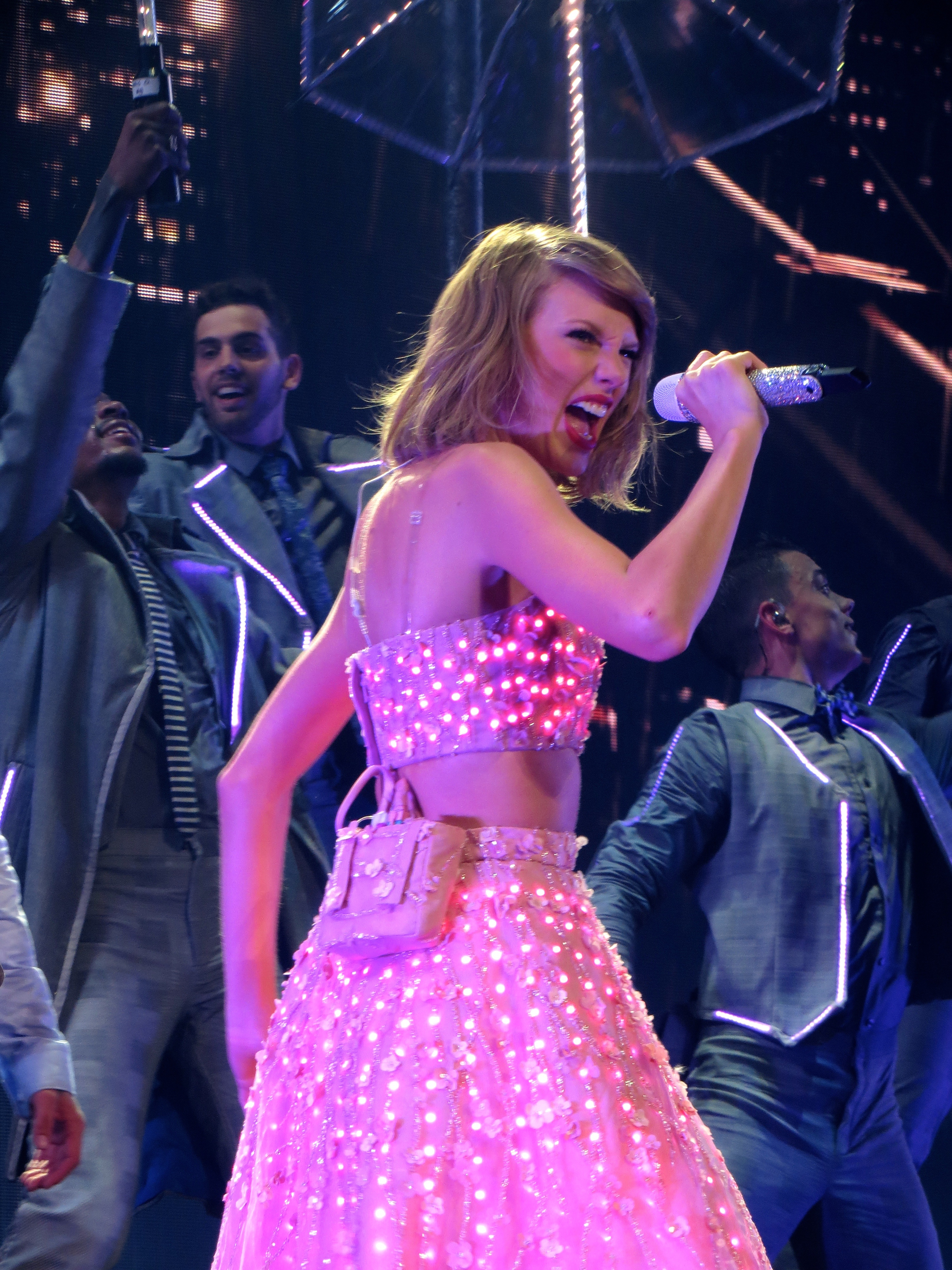
The performance of "How You Get the Girl" was accompanied by a Singin' in the Rain-inspired choreography.

The concert begins with black-and-white projections of street scenes, which subsequently serves as the backdrop to the performance of "Welcome to New York". Swift then emerges from beneath the stage to sing the song, followed by "New Romantics" surrounded by a dozen male dancers. Next, Swift sings "Blank Space" before erupting into a call-and-response climax where she strikes a golf club against a black lacquer cane whilst also shouting the name of the city where the concert is being held. Swift proceeds with an industrial rock-oriented version of "I Knew You Were Trouble", which she performs as shirtless male dancers delivered a sensual choreography.

After the performance of "I Wish You Would", Swift appears in a glowing pink polka-dot two piece dress to perform "How You Get the Girl", accompanied by a choreography inspired by the 1952 musical Singin' in the Rain that is performed by the dancers twirling neon umbrellas. The show continues with "I Know Places", during which Swift wears thigh-high black boots and garters. The song's intense lyrics and production are accompanied by a performance of Swift being chased by the masked dancers through multiple mobile doors as she sings "They are the hunters / We are the foxes." After the song ends, Swift performs "All You Had to Do Was Stay", followed by either "You Are in Love" or a different surprise song at several shows. "All You Had to Do Was Stay" is excluded from the set list for several shows. Swift introduces "Clean" by sharing lessons she had learned in her personal life with her audience. After "Clean", Swift performs a synth-oriented version of "Love Story" while standing on an elevated platform that whisks around the stadium.

Swift proceeds with "Style", during which she performs while strutting down the runway-styled stage in a sparkling dress, and "This Love". For the performance of "Bad Blood", Swift dresses in a top-to-toe black leather suit. She then delivers an intense rock version of "We Are Never Ever Getting Back Together" on an electric guitar. Afterwards, Swift emerges from beneath the stage again to perform a mashup of "Enchanted" and "Wildest Dreams" on a grand piano. She follows with "Out of the Woods" in a sparkling catsuit as giant paper planes fly overhead. The show concludes with "Shake It Off", during which Swift and the dancers perform on a spinning platform above the crowd with fireworks and confetti.

=== Adjustments and special guests ===
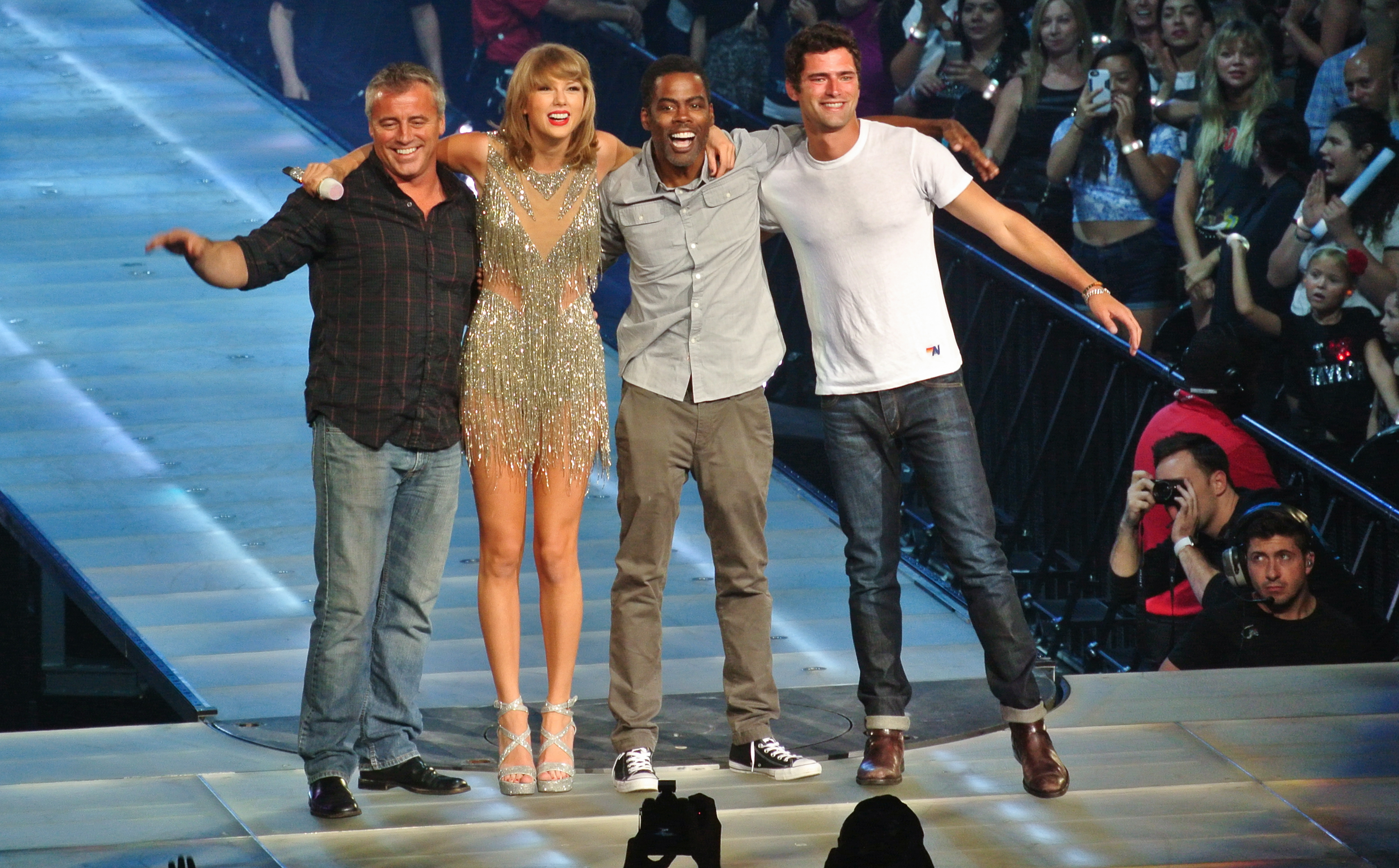
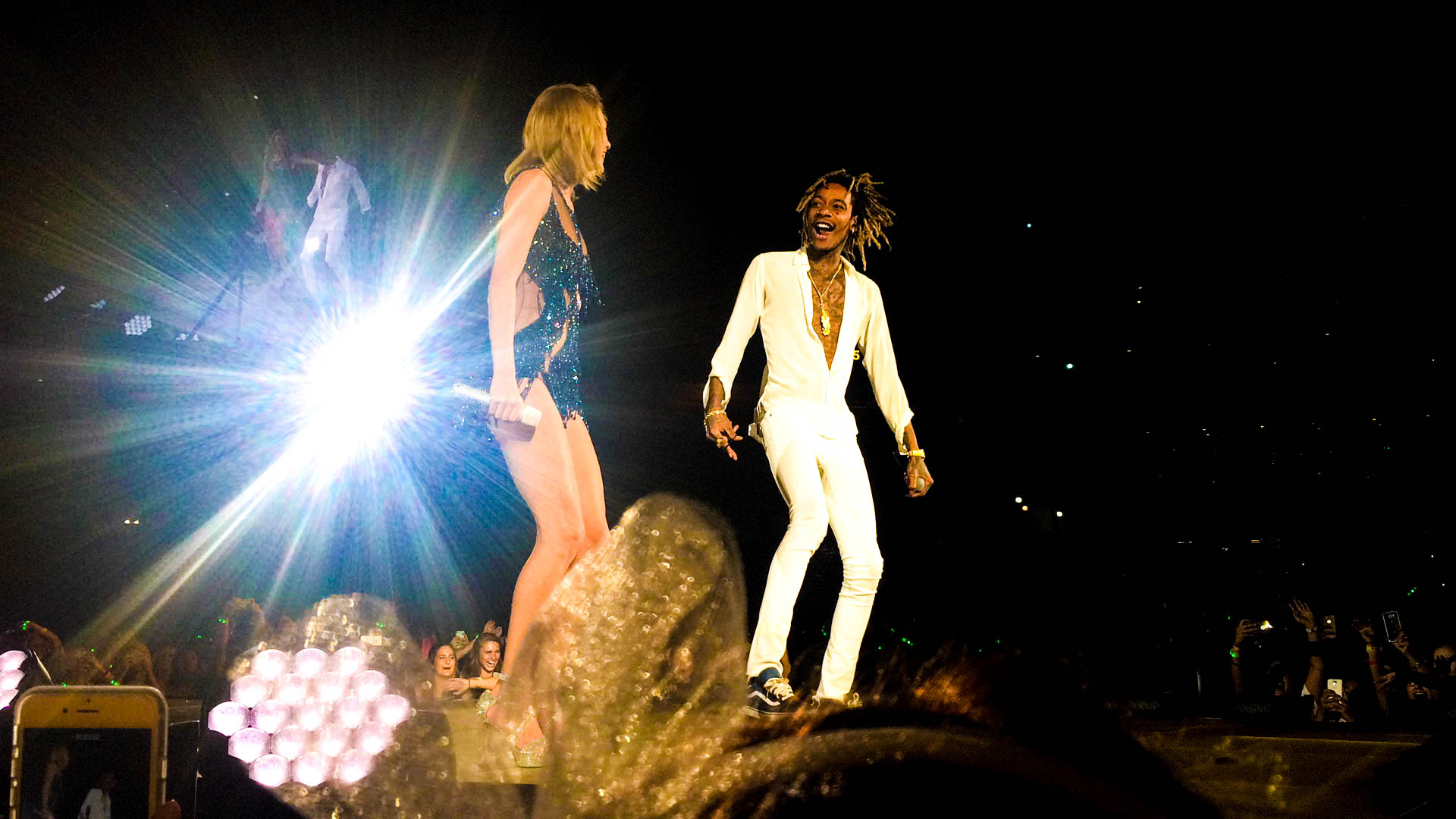
Throughout the tour, Swift invited special guests on different shows. She invited actor Matt LeBlanc, comedian Chris Rock and model Sean O'Pry on the August 22, 2015, Los Angeles show (top); and rapper Wiz Khalifa on the September 9, 2015, Houston show (bottom).

The shows on the 1989 World Tour features a nearly identical set list spanning the majority of the 1989 album, with the exception of the deluxe track "Wonderland". Different shows have different guest star appearances intertwined between Swift's performances. For select shows, Swift replaced "You Are in Love" with "Wonderland", or songs from her earlier albums. These included "Should've Said No" (from 2006's Taylor Swift); "You Belong with Me", "Fifteen" and "Fearless" (from 2008's Fearless); "Mean", "Sparks Fly" and "Mine" (from 2010's Speak Now); "Holy Ground", "All Too Well", and "Red" (from 2012's Red). During the second show in Santa Clara, California on August 15, 2015, Swift dedicated "Never Grow Up" (from Speak Now) to her godson, the second child of her friend, actress Jaime King. During the show in Glendale, Arizona, on August 17, Swift performed "Ronan" in dedication to Maya Thompson, the song's cowriter, and her late son.

A feature of the 1989 World Tour that attracted attention was the array of unannounced special guests that Swift invited onstage with her. Swift explained during an interview with Apple Music's Beats 1 Radio that since her fans could have expected what the show would look like through social media posts prior to attending, she wanted to incorporate an element of surprise: "They know the set list, they know the costumes, they've looked it up. That presented me with an interesting issue. I love the element of surprise… so going into this tour, having people pop on stage that you didn't expect to see." Though Swift had invited musicians onstage with her during previous tours, this time, she invited singers, models, athletes, and actors—public figures across "every type of field". A notable example was the show at London's Hyde Park in July 2015, during which she was joined onstage by models Martha Hunt, Kendall Jenner, Karlie Kloss, Gigi Hadid, and Cara Delevingne, who were subsequently noted by the media as members of Swift's "squad" and her representation of her newly established feminist identity. While some of the guests were scheduled beforehand, others were improvised; Swift asked singer John Legend to join her onstage only 40 minutes prior to showtime, after spotting him in the audience.

As the tour continued, special guests ranged from Hollywood actress Julia Roberts to counterculture figure Joan Baez. Nick Levine from the BBC observed that while these special guests were well appreciated by Swift's fans, their appearances gave the impression to others that Swift did so to prove her star power of her new image as a pop star, having abandoned her previous image as a country artist. In doing so, Swift's sense of authenticity began to slip, despite her global stardom. Kristy Fairclough, a professor in popular culture and film, commented: "Her shifting aesthetic and allegiances appear confusing in an overall narrative that presents Taylor Swift as the centre of the cultural universe." Fairclough asserted that while Swift had presented herself as an underdog and outsider from her contemporaries, which had garnered her a devoted fan base, she began to appear as "a profoundly unsympathetic underdog" for being a "globally famous, attractive, thin, white, very wealthy woman". When the tour ended, Swift acknowledged that "people might need a break from [her]". New York magazine listed Swift's "squad" as one of the defining moments of music in the 2010s decade.

== Critical reception ==
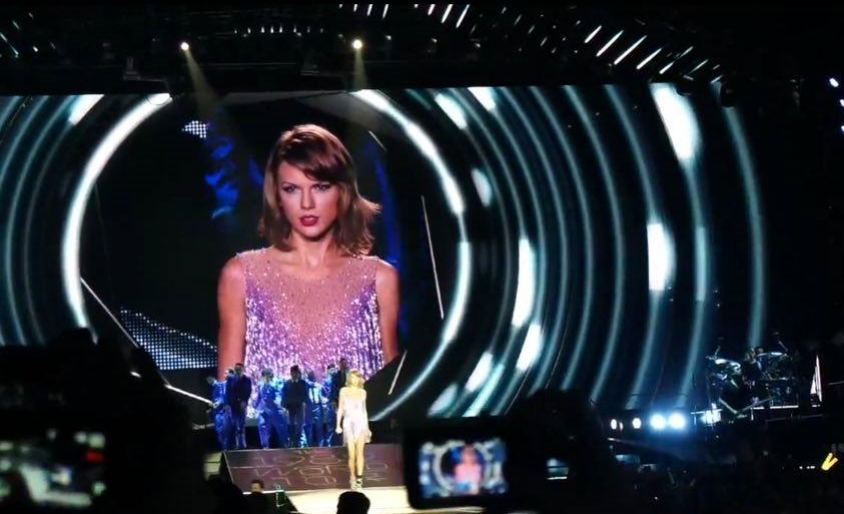
Swift performing "Style" strutting down the runway

The 1989 World Tour was met with universal acclaim; praise centered on the elaborate stage production and Swift's stage presence. Vice's Eric Sundermann appreciated Swift's ability to connect with her audiences, saying: "She has built a career on making music that’s suited for the fabric of our lives, so it makes sense that her show is engineered to be the best night of your life." Jon Caramanica, writing for The New York Times, acknowledged Swift's comfortable performance onstage. Rolling Stone critic Rob Sheffield appreciated the reworked versions of Swift's older songs and felt that she was pushing for an even more spectacular show than her much-praised previous Red Tour (2013–14): "Taking the easy way would have been 100 percent good enough. It just wasn’t what she wanted to do. Instead, she wanted to push a little harder and make a gloriously epic pop mess like this." In a similarly enthusiastic review, Kevin Coffrey from the Omaha World-Herald observed how the stage production complemented the songs: "Her show is on a level unlike anything I've ever seen."

Paige Allen from The Sun Chronicle was positive towards Swift's performance but felt that she could have carried the show without opening acts and special guests. Hunter Hauk of The Dallas Morning News also deemed the opening acts "forgettable" but was impressed by Swift's natural performance onstage. In a review of the Glasgow show, David Pollock from The Independent lauded Swift's energetic performance and described the show as a "resonantly feminist show which emphasises a fun, heartfelt message over polemic". Reviewing the tour's Sydney show, Bernard Zuel from the Sydney Morning Herald gave it four and a half stars. Zuel lauded the show as "one of the most spectacular stadium shows" he had ever seen and praised Swift's stage presence for creating a lively and euphoric energy. Reviewing the same show, Elle Hunt of The Guardian gave it five out of five stars, asserting that the show was a reminder of Swift's emotional engagement through her songs as her greatest asset that "has won her enormous global fandom". In 2017, Rolling Stone included the 1989 World Tour in their list of the "50 Greatest Concerts of the Last 50 Years".

== Commercial performance ==
=== Ticket sales ===
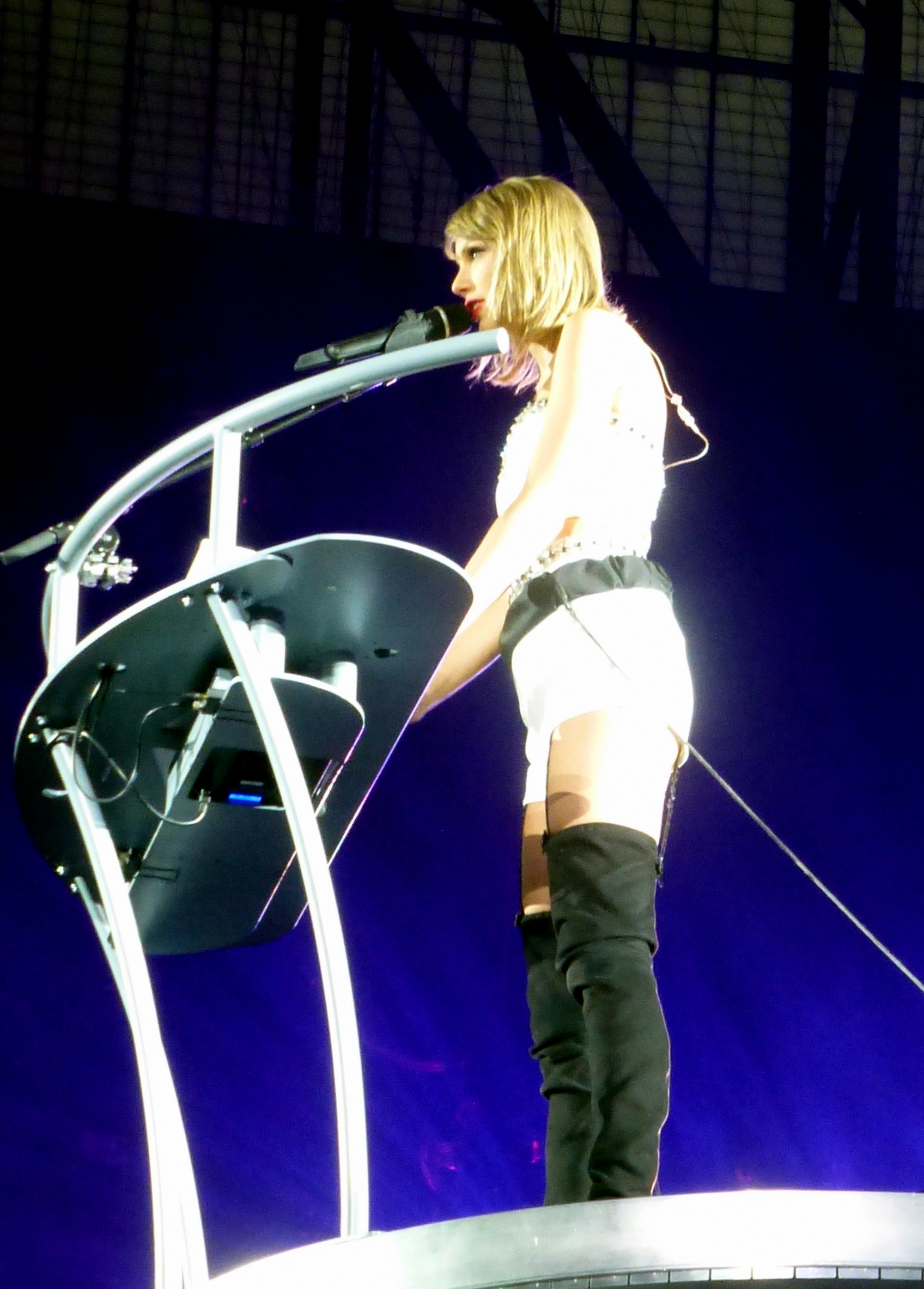
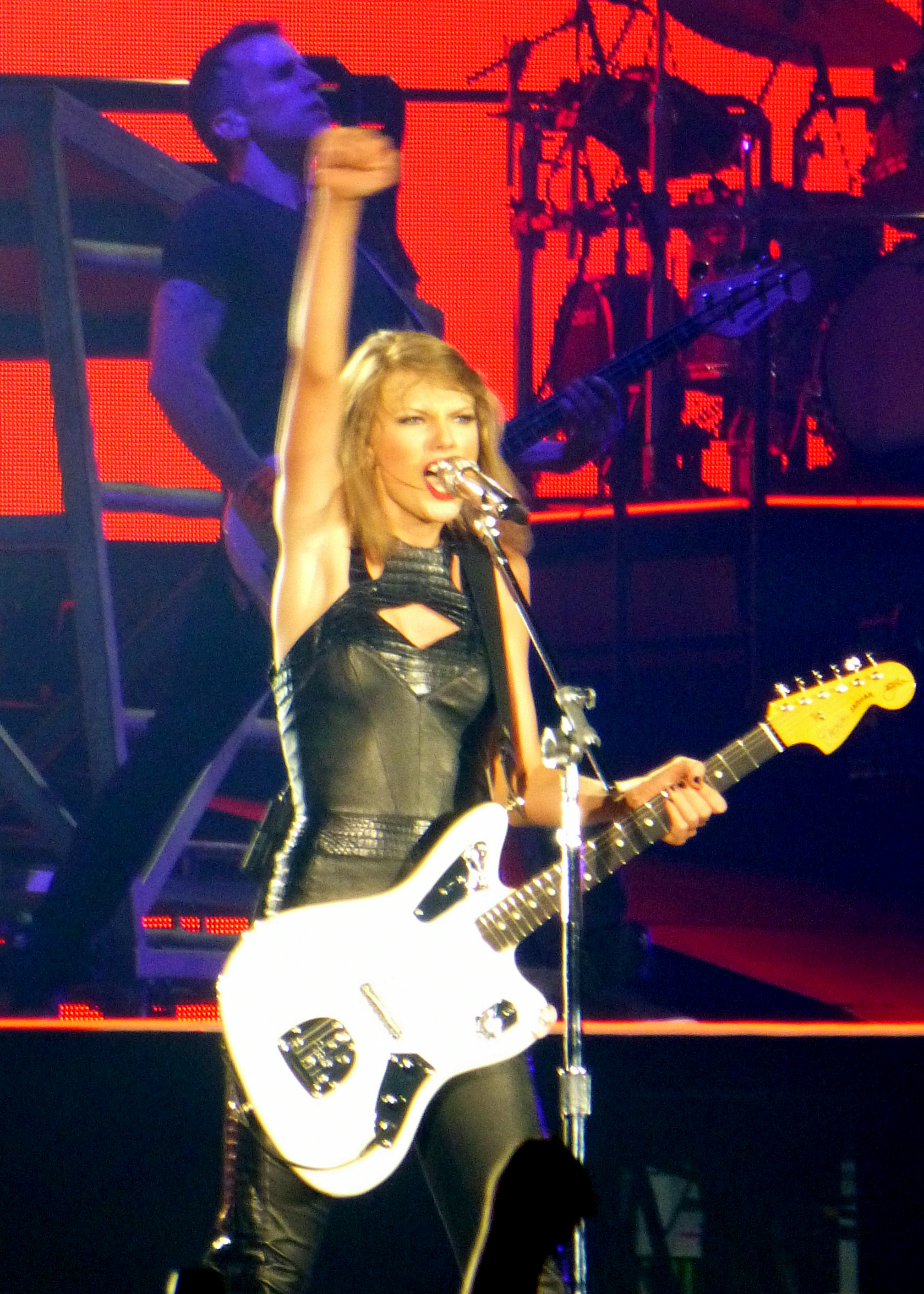
Apart from the 1989 songs, Swift performed reworked versions of her older material. She performed a synth version of "Love Story" (left) and a rock version of "We Are Never Ever Getting Back Together" (right).

Pre-sales for European shows of the 1989 World Tour started on November 4, and public on-sale started on November 7; tickets for London were sold later on November 10. The first round of pre-sales on selected North American shows started on November 7, and general sales for the public in North America started from November 14, 2014; Australia started from December 12, 2014; Japan started from the following day; Singapore and Shanghai started from June 30, 2015. Swift was the sixth-most-searched artist on Ticketmaster in 2014.

In St. Louis, Swift was originally scheduled to perform on October 13 and 14, 2015, but one of the St. Louis shows was dropped, and the other was rescheduled to September 28, 2015, with tickets going on sale on January 30, 2015. However, tickets for the St. Louis show sold out within minutes, resulting in a second date being added on September 29 at the same venue. Due to massive demand, Swift added more dates to the European leg, one for Cologne and one for Dublin. Swift added one more Dublin show after six minutes when the first show sold out, and tickets for both concerts sold out within 55 minutes. In Australia, tickets for the first show on December 11, 2015, in Melbourne, at AAMI Park were sold out in less than an hour. Soon afterwards, Swift announced extra dates for Melbourne and Adelaide. Due to popular demand, in July 2015, Swift added a third Melbourne show after the first two shows were sold out. Swift became the first female artist to play three shows at AAMI Park. In January 2015, Forbes reported that the 1989 World Tour was one of the most expensive concert tours of 2015 on the secondary market.

=== Boxscore ===
The tour topped the Billboard Hot Tours chart with Swift's first five shows from the North American run (May 20–June 6, 2015, excluding Baton Rouge), which generated $16.8 million from 149,708 ticket sales. It topped the Billboard Hot Tours chart for the second week, earning $15.2 million, with a total of 129,962 tickets sold from three shows in Charlotte and Philadelphia. By August 1, 2015, the 1989 World Tour had grossed $86.2 million, at 20 performances in North America, with 771,460 tickets sold at seven arenas and nine stadiums. On September 9, Billboard reported that the tour had grossed over $130 million, with 1.1 million tickets sold. The 1989 World Tour surpassed the Red Tour as Swift's highest-grossing by October 2015, when Billboard reported that the tour had grossed over $173 million. The tour also returned to number one on the Hot Tours chart, becoming Swift's sixth time atop the chart in 2015, thanks to ticket sales totaling $13.6 million from the shows in Toronto, St. Louis and Des Moines.

On Billboard's list of the "Top 25 Boxscores" published in December 2015, Swift scored seven entries with the 1989 World Tour shows, the highest number of entries among all touring acts. After concluding in Melbourne, the tour grossed over $250 million and became the world's highest-grossing tour in 2015, as reported by Pollstar. It was also the highest-grossing North American tour of 2015. The 1989 World Tour grossed nearly $200 million in North America alone, breaking the previous all-time high of $162 million set by the Rolling Stones in 2005. Two shows in Tokyo ranked at number nine on Pollstar's list of "2015 Year-End Top 100 International Boxoffice". Other shows appearing on the list were the shows in Melbourne, Sydney, Shanghai, and Brisbane. The 1989 World Tour also scored 24 entries on another list by Pollstar—"2015 Year-End Top 200 Concert Grossed [in North America]"—with her highest position (number five) being the two shows in East Rutherford and her lowest (number 160) being the two shows in Denver. Overall, the tour broke a string of attendance and grossing records, including the record for most sold-out shows by an artist in Staples Center history (16 shows across Swift's career), commemorated in a banner presented by Kobe Bryant.

== Concert film ==
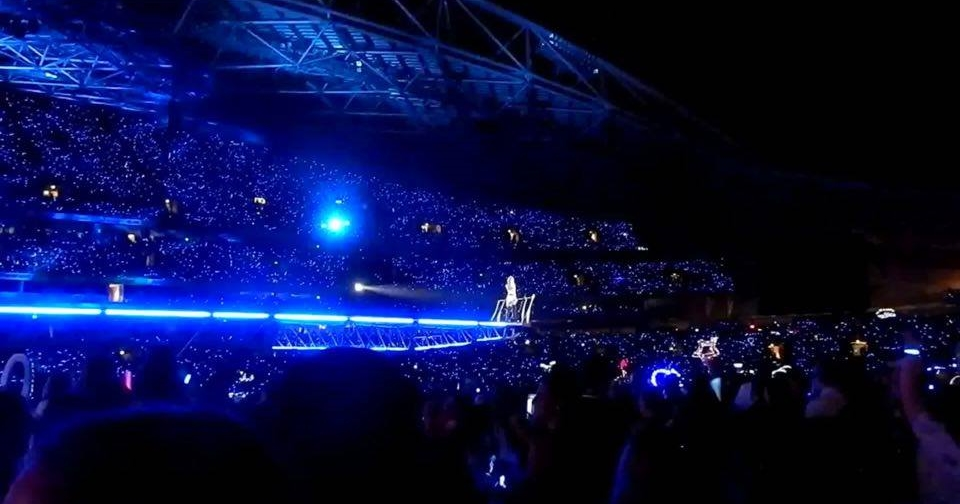
The concert film was filmed at the ANZ Stadium in Sydney (pictured).

A concert film titled The 1989 World Tour Live was released, in collaboration with Apple Music. On December 13, 2015, Swift announced the film, marking her first collaboration with Apple. The partnership with Apple Music was significant as it came after Swift had previously raised concerns about the compensation practices of streaming platforms. Earlier in 2015, Swift had pulled her catalog from Spotify, criticizing the service’s payment model for artists. Her move to collaborate with Apple Music, which had agreed to pay artists during the free trial period of its subscription service, was seen as aligning with her advocacy for fairer artist compensation in the digital music industry.

Directed by Jonas Åkerlund, the concert film primarily showcases the Sydney performance, which featured special guest appearances, a notable aspect of Swift's 1989 World Tour. While these collaborations were included, the film places significant emphasis on Swift’s performances and the overall scale of the show. The behind-the-scenes footage and live concert segments highlight both the production's intricacies and Swift's role at the center of the performance, offering a balanced view of the tour's creative process and execution.

The 1989 World Tour Live was initially made available exclusively on Apple Music on December 20, 2015. This release highlighted Swift’s influence in the streaming industry and her advocacy for better compensation for artists on digital platforms. The concert film remained available on the service for nearly five years before it was removed on May 22, 2020. Additionally, scenes from the film were later used in the music video for "New Romantics".

== Awards and nominations ==
List of awards and nominations received by the 1989 World Tour
| Award | Year | Category | Result | Ref. |
|---|---|---|---|---|
| Teen Choice Awards | 2015 | Choice Summer Tour | Nominated | |
| Billboard Touring Awards | 2015 | Top Tour | Nominated | |
| Billboard Touring Awards | 2015 | Top Draw | Nominated | |
| Capital Loves 2015 | 2015 | Best Live Show | Nominated | |
| MTV Europe Music Award | 2015 | Best US Act | Won | |
| MTV Europe Music Award | 2015 | Best Live Performance | Nominated | |
| Pollstar Awards | 2016 | Tour of the Year | Won | |
| Pollstar Awards | 2016 | Best Design | Nominated | |
| iHeartRadio Music Awards | 2016 | Best Tour | Won | |

== Set list ==
This set list is from the May 5, 2015 show in Tokyo. It is not representative of all shows throughout the tour.

1. "Welcome to New York"
2. "New Romantics"
3. "Blank Space"
4. "I Knew You Were Trouble"
5. "I Wish You Would"
6. "How You Get the Girl"
7. "I Know Places"
8. "All You Had to Do Was Stay"
9. "You Are in Love"
10. "Clean"
11. "Love Story"
12. "Style"
13. "This Love"
14. "Bad Blood"
15. "We Are Never Ever Getting Back Together" (rock version)
16. "Enchanted" / "Wildest Dreams"
17. "Out of the Woods"

Encore

18. "Shake It Off"

=== Notes ===
- During the second Washington concert, "This Love" was not performed. It was later, temporarily, cut from the set list from August 1 to October 31, where Swift would instead perform with a special guest.
- "All You Had to Do Was Stay" was not performed on select dates, until it was permanently cut on December 5.

=== Surprise songs ===
The following songs were performed by Swift in place of "You Are In Love":

- "Wonderland": During the shows in Las Vegas, Bossier City, Pittsburgh, and the second performance in Cologne
- "Holy Ground": During the second show in Dublin
- "You Belong with Me": During the second shows in East Rutherford, Washington, Denver, Columbus, Los Angeles, Adelaide, and Shanghai; the first shows in Toronto, Nashville, Kansas City, St. Louis, Foxborough, and Singapore; and the shows in Des Moines and Salt Lake City
- "Fifteen": During the first shows in Chicago, Omaha, Denver, Saint Paul, and Edmonton; the second shows in Melbourne, Toronto, St. Louis, Foxborough, Nashville, Kansas City, and Glendale; the third show in Los Angeles; and the shows in Indianapolis, Lexington, Arlington, Fargo, Miami, Greensboro, Atlanta, and Tampa
- "Mean": During the second shows in Chicago and Saint Paul, the fifth show in Los Angeles, and the shows in Seattle and Houston
- "Sparks Fly": During the show in Vancouver
- "Fearless": During the second shows in Edmonton and Omaha, and the show in San Diego
- "Should've Said No": During the first show in Santa Clara
- "Never Grow Up": During the second show in Santa Clara
- "Ronan": During the first show in Glendale
- "All Too Well": During the first show in Los Angeles
- "Red": During the first show in Columbus
- "Mine": During the show in Brisbane
- "Long Live": During the final show of the tour

=== Special guests ===
Below is the complete list of special guests who appeared onstage or performed with Swift.

- May 15, 2015 – Las Vegas: "Tenerife Sea" with Ed Sheeran.
- May 30, 2015 – Detroit: "Radioactive" with Dan Reynolds of Imagine Dragons; Martha Hunt & Gigi Hadid.
- June 6, 2015 – Pittsburgh: "Pontoon" with Little Big Town.
- June 12, 2015 – Philadelphia: "Cool Kids" with Echosmith; Cara Delevingne & Mariska Hargitay.
- June 13, 2015 – Philadelphia: "Fight Song" with Rachel Platten; Mariska Hargitay.
- June 27, 2015 – London: Gigi Hadid, Kendall Jenner, Serena Williams, Martha Hunt, Karlie Kloss and Cara Delevingne.
- July 10, 2015 – East Rutherford: "Can't Feel My Face" with the Weeknd; Heidi Klum and United States women's national soccer team; Lily Aldridge, Lena Dunham, Gigi Hadid and Hailee Steinfeld.
- July 11, 2015 – East Rutherford: "Jealous" with Nick Jonas; Gigi Hadid, Martha Hunt, Lily Aldridge, Candice Swanepoel, Behati Prinsloo, Karlie Kloss, and Uzo Aduba.
- July 13, 2015 – Washington: "Royals" with Lorde.
- July 14, 2015 – Washington: "Want to Want Me" with Jason Derulo.
- July 18, 2015 – Chicago: "Honey, I'm Good." with Andy Grammer; Serayah.
- July 19, 2015 – Chicago: "Take Your Time" with Sam Hunt; Andreja Pejić & Lily Donaldson.
- July 24, 2015 – Foxborough: "Shut Up and Dance" with Walk the Moon.
- July 25, 2015 – Foxborough: "Classic" with MKTO.
- August 1, 2015 – Vancouver: "Am I Wrong" with Nico & Vinz.
- August 8, 2015 – Seattle: "Trap Queen" with Fetty Wap; Ciara and Russell Wilson.
- August 14, 2015 – Santa Clara: "Worth It" with Fifth Harmony.
- August 15, 2015 – Santa Clara: "Black Magic" with Little Mix; Joan Baez and Julia Roberts.
- August 21, 2015 – Los Angeles: "Counting Stars" with Ryan Tedder of OneRepublic; Kobe Bryant presenting Swift with a banner hung on the Staples Center rafters in honor of Swift's 16 sold-out shows, the most of any recording artist at the arena.
- August 22, 2015 – Los Angeles: "White Horse" with Uzo Aduba; Chris Rock, Matt LeBlanc and Sean O'Pry; "Doubt" and "Family Affair" with Mary J. Blige.
- August 24, 2015 – Los Angeles: "Goodbye Earl" with Natalie Maines of the Dixie Chicks; Ellen DeGeneres; "You Oughta Know" with Alanis Morissette.
- August 25, 2015 – Los Angeles: "Dreams" with Beck and St. Vincent; "All of Me" with John Legend.
- August 26, 2015 – Los Angeles: "Good for You" with Selena Gomez; "Smelly Cat" with Lisa Kudrow; "Mirrors" with Justin Timberlake.
- August 29, 2015 – San Diego: "Cheerleader" with OMI; "Complicated" with Avril Lavigne.
- September 9, 2015 – Houston: "See You Again" with Wiz Khalifa.
- September 16, 2015 – Indianapolis: "If I Die Young" with The Band Perry.
- September 18, 2015 – Columbus: "Cool Kids" with Sydney Sierota of Echosmith.
- September 21, 2015 – Kansas City: "Every Mile a Memory" with Dierks Bentley.
- September 25, 2015 – Nashville: "Love Me Like You Mean It" with Kelsea Ballerini; "I Don't Want to Miss a Thing" with Steven Tyler of Aerosmith; "When You Say Nothing at All" with Alison Krauss.
- September 26, 2015 – Nashville: "Bleeding Love" with Leona Lewis; "(I Can't Get No) Satisfaction" with Mick Jagger of The Rolling Stones.
- September 29, 2015 – St. Louis: "The Fix" with Nelly, and "Hot in Herre" with Nelly and Haim. To celebrate Haim's last night on the tour, Swift invited them to join her onstage as back-up dancers for Nelly.
- October 2, 2015 – Toronto: "John Cougar, John Deere, John 3:16" and "Somebody Like You" with Keith Urban.
- October 3, 2015 – Toronto: "Boom Clap" with Charli XCX.
- October 17, 2015 – Arlington: "Love Me like You Do" with Ellie Goulding.
- October 21, 2015 – Greensboro: "Little Red Wagon" with Miranda Lambert.
- October 24, 2015 – Atlanta: "Talking Body" with Tove Lo.
- October 27, 2015 – Miami: Dwyane Wade presenting Swift a "13" numbered jersey in honor of Swift's lucky number and his 13th season with the Miami Heat; "Give Me Everything" with Pitbull; "Livin' la Vida Loca" with Ricky Martin.
- October 31, 2015 – Tampa: "Here" with Alessia Cara; "Let It Go" with Idina Menzel. During "Style", before "Let It Go" was performed, Swift wore an Olaf costume while Menzel wore her in-voice character Elsa, both from Frozen, in honor of Halloween.

== Tour dates ==
List of concerts
| Date (2015) | City | Country | Venue | Opening acts | Attendance | Revenue |
|---|---|---|---|---|---|---|
| May 5 | Tokyo | Japan | Tokyo Dome | —N/a | 100,320 / 100,320 | $10,586,828 |
| May 6 | Tokyo | Japan | Tokyo Dome | —N/a | 100,320 / 100,320 | $10,586,828 |
| May 15 (Note: The concert was part of Rock in Rio USA.) | Winchester (Note: Promoted as Las Vegas) | United States | City of Rock | —N/a | | |
| May 20 | Bossier City | United States | CenturyLink Center | Vance Joy | 12,459 / 12,459 | $1,458,197 |
| May 22 | Baton Rouge | United States | LSU Tiger Stadium | Vance Joy; Shawn Mendes | 50,227 / 50,227 | $4,119,670 |
| May 30 | Detroit | United States | Ford Field | Vance Joy; Shawn Mendes | 50,703 / 50,703 | $5,999,690 |
| June 2 | Louisville | United States | KFC Yum! Center | Vance Joy | 16,242 / 16,242 | $1,863,281 |
| June 3 | Cleveland | United States | Quicken Loans Arena | Vance Joy | 15,503 / 15,503 | $1,732,041 |
| June 6 | Pittsburgh | United States | Heinz Field | Vance Joy; Shawn Mendes | 54,801 / 54,801 | $5,836,926 |
| June 8 | Charlotte | United States | Time Warner Cable Arena | Vance Joy | 15,024 / 15,024 | $1,627,798 |
| June 9 | Raleigh | United States | PNC Arena | Vance Joy | 13,886 / 13,886 | $1,653,762 |
| June 12 | Philadelphia | United States | Lincoln Financial Field | Vance Joy; Shawn Mendes | 101,052 / 101,052 | $11,987,816 |
| June 13 | Philadelphia | United States | Lincoln Financial Field | Vance Joy; Shawn Mendes | 101,052 / 101,052 | $11,987,816 |
| June 19 | Cologne | Germany | Lanxess Arena | James Bay | 29,020 / 29,020 | $2,054,690 |
| June 20 | Cologne | Germany | Lanxess Arena | James Bay | 29,020 / 29,020 | $2,054,690 |
| June 21 | Amsterdam | Netherlands | Ziggo Dome | James Bay | 11,166 / 11,166 | $800,829 |
| June 23 | Glasgow | Scotland | SSE Hydro | Vance Joy | 11,021 / 11,021 | $1,119,300 |
| June 24 | Manchester | England | Manchester Arena | Vance Joy | 14,773 / 14,773 | $1,478,760 |
| June 27 (Note: The concert was part of the British Summer Time.) | London | England | Hyde Park | —N/a | | |
| June 29 | Dublin | Ireland | 3Arena | Vance Joy | 25,188 / 25,188 | $1,975,510 |
| June 30 | Dublin | Ireland | 3Arena | Vance Joy | 25,188 / 25,188 | $1,975,510 |
| July 6 | Ottawa | Canada | Canadian Tire Centre | Vance Joy | 13,480 / 13,480 | $1,325,480 |
| July 7 | Montreal | Canada | Bell Centre | Vance Joy | 14,770 / 14,770 | $1,499,040 |
| July 10 | East Rutherford | United States | MetLife Stadium | Vance Joy; Shawn Mendes; Haim | 110,105 / 110,105 | $13,423,858 |
| July 11 | East Rutherford | United States | MetLife Stadium | Vance Joy; Shawn Mendes; Haim | 110,105 / 110,105 | $13,423,858 |
| July 13 | Washington, D.C. | United States | Nationals Park | Vance Joy; Shawn Mendes; Haim | 85,014 / 85,014 | $9,730,596 |
| July 14 | Washington, D.C. | United States | Nationals Park | Vance Joy; Shawn Mendes; Haim | 85,014 / 85,014 | $9,730,596 |
| July 18 | Chicago | United States | Soldier Field | Vance Joy; Shawn Mendes; Haim | 110,109 / 110,109 | $11,469,887 |
| July 19 | Chicago | United States | Soldier Field | Vance Joy; Shawn Mendes; Haim | 110,109 / 110,109 | $11,469,887 |
| July 24 | Foxborough | United States | Gillette Stadium | Vance Joy; Shawn Mendes; Haim | 116,849 / 116,849 | $12,533,166 |
| July 25 | Foxborough | United States | Gillette Stadium | Vance Joy; Shawn Mendes; Haim | 116,849 / 116,849 | $12,533,166 |
| August 1 | Vancouver | Canada | BC Place | Vance Joy; Shawn Mendes | 41,463 / 41,463 | $4,081,820 |
| August 4 | Edmonton | Canada | Rexall Place | Vance Joy | 26,534 / 26,534 | $2,387,080 |
| August 5 | Edmonton | Canada | Rexall Place | Vance Joy | 26,534 / 26,534 | $2,387,080 |
| August 8 | Seattle | United States | CenturyLink Field | Vance Joy; Shawn Mendes | 55,711 / 55,711 | $6,050,643 |
| August 14 | Santa Clara | United States | Levi's Stadium | Vance Joy; Shawn Mendes | 102,139 / 102,139 | $13,031,146 |
| August 15 | Santa Clara | United States | Levi's Stadium | Vance Joy; Shawn Mendes | 102,139 / 102,139 | $13,031,146 |
| August 17 | Glendale | United States | Gila River Arena | Vance Joy | 26,520 / 26,520 | $3,029,628 |
| August 18 | Glendale | United States | Gila River Arena | Vance Joy | 26,520 / 26,520 | $3,029,628 |
| August 21 | Los Angeles | United States | Staples Center | Vance Joy; Haim | 70,563 / 70,563 | $8,961,681 |
| August 22 | Los Angeles | United States | Staples Center | Vance Joy; Haim | 70,563 / 70,563 | $8,961,681 |
| August 24 | Los Angeles | United States | Staples Center | Vance Joy; Haim | 70,563 / 70,563 | $8,961,681 |
| August 25 | Los Angeles | United States | Staples Center | Vance Joy; Haim | 70,563 / 70,563 | $8,961,681 |
| August 26 | Los Angeles | United States | Staples Center | Vance Joy; Haim | 70,563 / 70,563 | $8,961,681 |
| August 29 | San Diego | United States | Petco Park | Vance Joy; Shawn Mendes | 44,710 / 44,710 | $5,475,237 |
| September 4 | Salt Lake City | United States | EnergySolutions Arena | Vance Joy | 14,131 / 14,131 | $1,589,686 |
| September 5 | Denver | United States | Pepsi Center | Vance Joy | 27,126 / 27,126 | $2,868,991 |
| September 6 | Denver | United States | Pepsi Center | Vance Joy | 27,126 / 27,126 | $2,868,991 |
| September 9 (Note: The concert was originally planned to take place on October 13, but was rescheduled to avoid any potential scheduling conflict with the Houston Astros possibly making the 2015 Major League Baseball postseason.) | Houston | United States | Minute Maid Park | Vance Joy; Shawn Mendes | 40,122 / 40,122 | $5,202,196 |
| September 11 | Saint Paul | United States | Xcel Energy Center | Vance Joy | 45,126 / 45,126 | $5,514,863 |
| September 12 | Saint Paul | United States | Xcel Energy Center | Vance Joy | 45,126 / 45,126 | $5,514,863 |
| September 13 | Saint Paul | United States | Xcel Energy Center | Vance Joy | 45,126 / 45,126 | $5,514,863 |
| September 16 | Indianapolis | United States | Bankers Life Fieldhouse | Vance Joy | 14,010 / 14,010 | $1,550,268 |
| September 17 | Columbus | United States | Nationwide Arena | Vance Joy | 29,936 / 29,936 | $3,369,693 |
| September 18 | Columbus | United States | Nationwide Arena | Vance Joy | 29,936 / 29,936 | $3,369,693 |
| September 21 | Kansas City | United States | Sprint Center | Vance Joy | 27,857 / 27,857 | $2,967,558 |
| September 22 | Kansas City | United States | Sprint Center | Vance Joy | 27,857 / 27,857 | $2,967,558 |
| September 25 | Nashville | United States | Bridgestone Arena | Vance Joy; Haim | 28,917 / 28,917 | $3,354,844 |
| September 26 | Nashville | United States | Bridgestone Arena | Vance Joy; Haim | 28,917 / 28,917 | $3,354,844 |
| September 28 (Note: The concert was originally planned to take place on October 13, but was rescheduled after Swift added Houston to the dates.) | St. Louis | United States | Scottrade Center | Vance Joy; Haim | 29,688 / 29,688 | $3,452,940 |
| September 29 (Note: The concert was originally planned to take place on October 14, but was rescheduled after Swift added Houston to the dates. After that, St. Louis shows downsized from two to one. However, due to overwhelming demand, the second show was added again.) | St. Louis | United States | Scottrade Center | Vance Joy; Haim | 29,688 / 29,688 | $3,452,940 |
| October 2 | Toronto | Canada | Rogers Centre | Vance Joy; Shawn Mendes | 99,283 / 99,283 | $8,670,990 |
| October 3 | Toronto | Canada | Rogers Centre | Vance Joy; Shawn Mendes | 99,283 / 99,283 | $8,670,990 |
| October 8 | Des Moines | United States | Wells Fargo Arena | Vance Joy | 13,969 / 13,969 | $1,566,321 |
| October 9 | Omaha | United States | CenturyLink Center Omaha | Vance Joy | 29,622 / 29,622 | $3,121,421 |
| October 10 | Omaha | United States | CenturyLink Center Omaha | Vance Joy | 29,622 / 29,622 | $3,121,421 |
| October 12 (Note: The concert was originally planned to take place on September 9, but was rescheduled after Swift added Houston to the dates.) | Fargo | United States | Fargodome | Vance Joy | 21,067 / 21,067 | $2,219,188 |
| October 17 | Arlington | United States | AT&T Stadium | Vance Joy; Shawn Mendes | 62,630 / 62,630 | $7,396,733 |
| October 20 | Lexington | United States | Rupp Arena | Vance Joy | 17,084 / 17,084 | $1,870,471 |
| October 21 | Greensboro | United States | Greensboro Coliseum | Vance Joy | 15,079 / 15,079 | $1,662,171 |
| October 24 | Atlanta | United States | Georgia Dome | Vance Joy; Shawn Mendes | 56,046 / 56,046 | $6,034,846 |
| October 27 | Miami | United States | American Airlines Arena | Vance Joy | 14,044 / 14,044 | $1,527,919 |
| October 31 | Tampa | United States | Raymond James Stadium | Vance Joy; Shawn Mendes | 56,987 / 56,987 | $6,202,515 |
| November 7 | Singapore | | Singapore Indoor Stadium | —N/a | 17,726 / 17,726 | $3,217,569 |
| November 8 | Singapore | | Singapore Indoor Stadium | —N/a | 17,726 / 17,726 | $3,217,569 |
| November 10 | Shanghai | China | Mercedes-Benz Arena | —N/a | 37,758 / 37,758 | $5,917,348 |
| November 11 | Shanghai | China | Mercedes-Benz Arena | —N/a | 37,758 / 37,758 | $5,917,348 |
| November 12 | Shanghai | China | Mercedes-Benz Arena | —N/a | 37,758 / 37,758 | $5,917,348 |
| November 28 | Sydney | Australia | ANZ Stadium | Vance Joy | 75,980 / 75,980 | $6,571,683 |
| December 5 | Brisbane | Australia | Suncorp Stadium | Vance Joy | 46,881 / 46,881 | $4,759,471 |
| December 7 | Adelaide | Australia | Adelaide Entertainment Centre | Vance Joy | 20,090 / 20,090 | $2,407,499 |
| December 8 | Adelaide | Australia | Adelaide Entertainment Centre | Vance Joy | 20,090 / 20,090 | $2,407,499 |
| December 10 | Melbourne | Australia | AAMI Park | Vance Joy | 98,136 / 98,136 | $10,421,553 |
| December 11 | Melbourne | Australia | AAMI Park | Vance Joy | 98,136 / 98,136 | $10,421,553 |
| December 12 | Melbourne | Australia | AAMI Park | Vance Joy | 98,136 / 98,136 | $10,421,553 |
| Total | | | | | 2,278,647 / 2,278,647 (100%) | $250,733,097 |

== Personnel ==
Adapted from The 1989 World Tour Book

Show

- Erica Worden – tour manager
- Tree Paine – publicist
- Arthur Kemish – production manager
- Chris Rowe – audio
- Dewey Shepard – stage manager
- Donna Edmondson – hair and make-up
- Jemma Muradian – hair stylist
- Lorrie Turk – make-up artist
- Scott Coraci – video engineer
- Tyce Diorio – choreographer
- Tricia Miranda – assistant choreographer

Band

- Taylor Swift – lead vocals, acoustic guitar, electric guitar, piano, keyboard
- David Cook – musical director, keyboards
- Matt Billingslea – drums, electronic percussion
- Amos Heller – bass, synth bass, vocals
- Eliotte Henderson – background vocalist
- Kamilah Marshall – background vocalist
- Michael Meadows – guitars, keyboards, vocals
- Melanie Nyema – background vocalist
- Paul Sidoti – guitar, vocals
- Clare Turton-Derrico – background vocalist
- Dane Laboyrie – trumpet
- Brendan Champion – trombone
- James Mackay – tenor saxophone
- Jimmy Garden – baritone saxophone

Dancers

- Christian Henderson
- Jacob Kodish
- Christian Owens
- Maho Udo
- Austin Spacy
- Mark Villaver
- Nolan Padilla
- Remi Bakkar
- Richard Cutler
- Giuseppe Giofrè
- Robert Green

Wardrobe

- Floyd Williamd
- Joseph Cassell
- Jessica Jones
- Shannon Summers
- Tyler Green
- Todd Cantrell
- Pamela Lewis

Executive producers

- Taylor Swift
- Andrea Swift
- Robert Allen
- Austin Fish

Production designers

- Taylor Swift
- Baz Halpin
- Chris Nyfield

== See also ==
- List of highest-grossing concert tours
- List of highest-grossing concert tours by women
