= You Are in Love =

2014 song by Taylor Swift

Promotional single by Taylor Swift

from the album 1989 (Deluxe Edition)
- Released: February 24, 2015
- Studio: Jungle City (New York)
- Genre: Electropop
- Length: 4:27
- Label: Big Machine
- Songwriters: Taylor Swift; Jack Antonoff
- Producers: Taylor Swift; Jack Antonoff

Audio video
- "You Are in Love" on YouTube

"You Are in Love (Taylor's Version)"

Song by Taylor Swift

from the album 1989 (Taylor's Version)
- Released: October 27, 2023
- Studio: Conway Recording (Los Angeles); Electric Lady (New York); Rough Customer (Brooklyn); Sharp Sonics (Los Angeles)
- Length: 4:27
- Label: Republic
- Songwriters: Taylor Swift; Jack Antonoff
- Producers: Taylor Swift; Jack Antonoff

Lyric video
- "You Are in Love (Taylor's Version)" on YouTube

"You Are in Love" is a song by the American singer-songwriter Taylor Swift from the deluxe edition of her fifth studio album, 1989 (2014). Big Machine Records released the track as an iTunes Store-exclusive download on February 24, 2015. Swift wrote and produced the song with Jack Antonoff, whose relationship with the writer-actress Lena Dunham influenced its lyrical content. Some critics applauded the song's portrayal of love with simple lyrics and production, although a few others deemed the track insubstantial.

The song was the inspiration for the music video of Swift's 2019 single "Lover". Following a dispute over her masters with her former label, Big Machine Records, Swift re-recorded the song as "You Are in Love (Taylor's Version)", as part of her fourth re-recorded album, 1989 (Taylor's Version) (2023).

== Background and writing ==
Taylor Swift had identified as a country musician until her fourth studio album, Red, which was released on October 22, 2012. Red incorporates eclectic pop and rock styles beyond the country stylings of Swift's past albums, which led to critics questioning her country-music identity. Swift finalized her fifth studio album in mid-2014, during the Asian leg of the Red Tour. Inspired by 1980s synth-pop, she named the album 1989 after her birth year to signify an artistic reinvention: she described it as her first "official pop album". On 1989, Swift worked with new producers including Jack Antonoff, who produced three tracks with Swift, including "You Are in Love". Antonoff first sent Swift the instrumental track of "You Are in Love", with Swift later writing the lyrics to it.

== Music and lyrics ==
"You Are in Love" is an atmospheric electropop ballad instrumented by a recurring synth riff that critics thought to evoke the music of Bruce Springsteen; David Greenwalt of The Oregonian thought that it "[echoes] the synth tones" of "Streets of Philadelphia" (1993), while Sal Cinquemani of Slant Magazine picked "Secret Garden" (1995) as a possible influence. The lyrics, narrated from an outside woman's perspective, present imagery of various phases and experiences in a fruitful relationship ("small talk", "coffee at midnight", "kisses on sidewalk"), with the words being set to a four-note motif that forms the melody of the verses. According to Swift, the inspiration was the relationship of Antonoff and the writer-actress Lena Dunham, both of whom were close friends of hers. Dunham dubbed it as her "someday wedding song".

When interviewed about writing "You Are in Love", Swift said she found it difficult and boring at times. The song also describes love as something that does not need to be perfect. Swift also said that she wrote it as a commentary of Antonoff and Dunham's relationship, saying that she's actually going through everything that happened in it. The song is also the inspiration for the music video of the title track of her seventh studio album, "Lover".

== Release and commercial performance ==
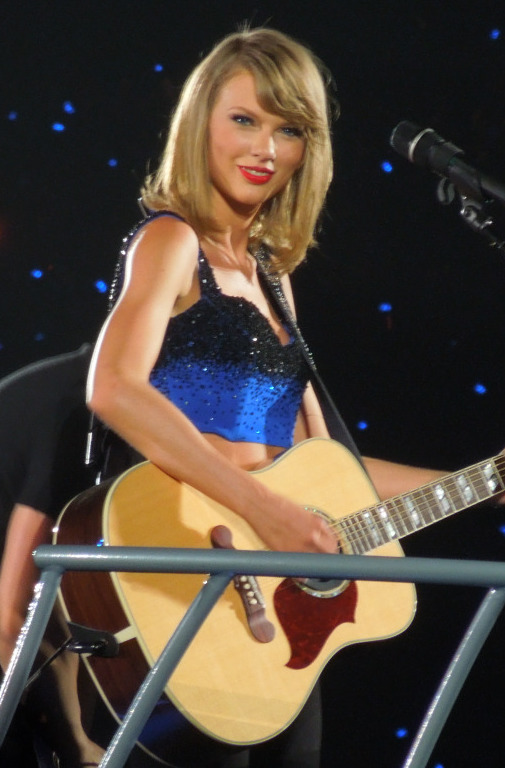
Swift performing "You Are in Love" on acoustic guitar during the 1989 World Tour

"You Are in Love" was originally included as one of the three bonus cuts on the deluxe package of 1989, which was released exclusively at Target in the United States. On February 17, 2015, Swift announced that she would make all the bonus tracks available to US iTunes Stores as promotional singles one at a time. The song was released on February 24, 2015, by Big Machine Records.

"You Are in Love" debuted on both the US Billboard Hot 100 and Canadian Hot 100, with peaks of number 83 and number 99, respectively. The track was featured in the setlist of the 1989 World Tour (2015), where Swift would sing it on acoustic guitar. On August 4, 2023, she sang the song with a piano during the Los Angeles stop as part of her Eras Tour (2023–2024) and included it on the extended cut of the tour's associated concert film. Swift later performs "You Are in Love" as a surprise number in mashup with "Cowboy like Me" (2020) on piano and "Fresh Out the Slammer" (2024) on guitar during the Amsterdam and Munich stops respectively. In January 2024, the song received a gold certification from the Australian Recording Industry Association (ARIA) for selling over 35,000 units.

After signing a new contract with Republic Records, Swift began re-recording her first six studio albums in November 2020. The decision came after a 2019 public dispute between Swift and the talent manager Scooter Braun, who acquired Big Machine Records, including the masters of Swift's albums the label had released. By re-recording them, Swift had full ownership of the new masters, including the copyright licensing of her songs, devaluing the Big Machine-owned masters. The re-recording of "You Are in Love", subtitled "Taylor's Version", was released as part of Swift's fourth re-recorded album, 1989 (Taylor's Version), on October 27, 2023. It debuted and peaked at number 38 on the Billboard Global 200 and reached the countries of New Zealand (38), Canada (42), and the US (43).

== Critical reception ==
Hannah Yasharoff and David Oliver, writing for USA Today, commended two lines from "You Are in Love": "You understand now why they lost their minds and fought the wars / And why I've spent my whole life trying to put it in words", further elaborating that it "[puts] specific and universal feelings into words", something Swift "does best". Billboard's Ashley Iasimone compared the song to "The Lakes", elaborating that both songs portray "love that's as pretty as a picture, the kind that has no place for the noise from the outside world". Alex Berry of Clash applauded the song for being an "ethereal, delicate [ballad]", while Grace Wehniainen of Bustle commended it for being a "hidden gem among gems", further elaborating that it "isn't just a gorgeous song, but a handy time capsule for Swift's personal and professional life". Vulture's Nate Jones complimented its simplicity demonstrated by the "appropriately restrained" vocals and production, and Variety's Chris Willman deemed the track "a sweet testament to being aspirational about love through the proxy passions of friends". Amara Sorosiak of American Songwriter ranked it eighth in a 2024 list of "Taylor Swift's Top 10 Love Songs", praising "her stripped-back, atmospheric pop prowess".

On a less positive side, Jane Song of Paste ranked "You Are in Love" 66th out of 158 in a 2020 ranking of Swift's songs, considering it "sweet", but also noting that the romantic rumors of Antonoff blemished its message. Courteney Larocca of Business Insider regarded the song as one of the 17 worst Taylor Swift songs, criticizing it for being "boring" and commenting that "It's just disappointing that a song about realizing you're fully in love is about a relationship that ultimately didn't work out—and wasn't even one from Swift's own life". Reviewing the re-recording, "You Are in Love (Taylor's Version)", Hugh G. Puddles argued that it declines in quality due to Antonoff's "overstating his ascending synth arpeggios in the chorus, walking headlong into the '80s kitsch" that overshadows Swift's understated vocals as in the original.

== Credits and personnel ==
"You Are in Love" (2014)

- Taylor Swift – lead vocals, background vocals, songwriter, producer
- Jack Antonoff – songwriter, producer, keyboards, drums, electric guitar, bass guitar
- Max Martin – vocal producer
- Serban Ghenea – mixing
- John Hanes – engineered for mix
- Peter Carlsson – Pro Tools engineer
- Tom Coyne – mastering

"You Are in Love (Taylor's Version)" (2023)

- Taylor Swift – vocals, background vocals, songwriter, producer
- Jack Antonoff – songwriter, producer, programming, engineering, synthesizer, electric guitar, bass guitar, drums
- Mikey Freedom Hart – synthesizer, electric guitar, acoustic guitar, programming, engineering
- Evan Smith – synthesizer, programming, engineering
- Michael Riddleberger – drums, percussion, engineering
- Sean Hutchinson – drums, percussion, programming, engineering
- Zem Audu – synthesizer, engineering
- Christopher Rowe – engineering
- David Hart – engineering
- Oli Jacobs – engineering
- Jon Sher – engineering assistance
- Megan Searl – engineering assistance
- Joey Miller – engineering assistance
- Jozef Caldwell – engineering assistance
- Serban Ghenea – mixing
- Randy Merrill – mastering
- Ryan Smith – mastering

== Charts ==
=== "You Are in Love" ===
Chart performance for "You Are in Love"
Chart (2014–2015)	Peak position
Canada Hot 100 (Billboard)	99
US Billboard Hot 100	83

=== "You Are in Love (Taylor's Version)" ===
Chart performance for "You Are in Love (Taylor's Version)"
Chart (2023)	Peak position
Canada Hot 100 (Billboard)	42
Global 200 (Billboard)	38
Greece International (IFPI Greece)	70
New Zealand (Recorded Music NZ)	38
Portugal (AFP)	108
UK Audio Streaming (Official Charts)	41
US Billboard Hot 100	43

== Certifications ==
Certification for "You Are in Love"
Region	Certification	Certified units/sales
Australia (ARIA)	Gold	35,000^{‡}
New Zealand (RMNZ)	Gold	15,000^{‡}
^{‡} Sales+streaming figures based on certification alone.

Certification for "You Are in Love (Taylor's Version)"
Region	Certification	Certified units/sales
Australia (ARIA)	Gold	35,000^{‡}
^{‡} Sales+streaming figures based on certification alone.
