= List of songs by Taylor Swift =

Songs by American singer-songwriter

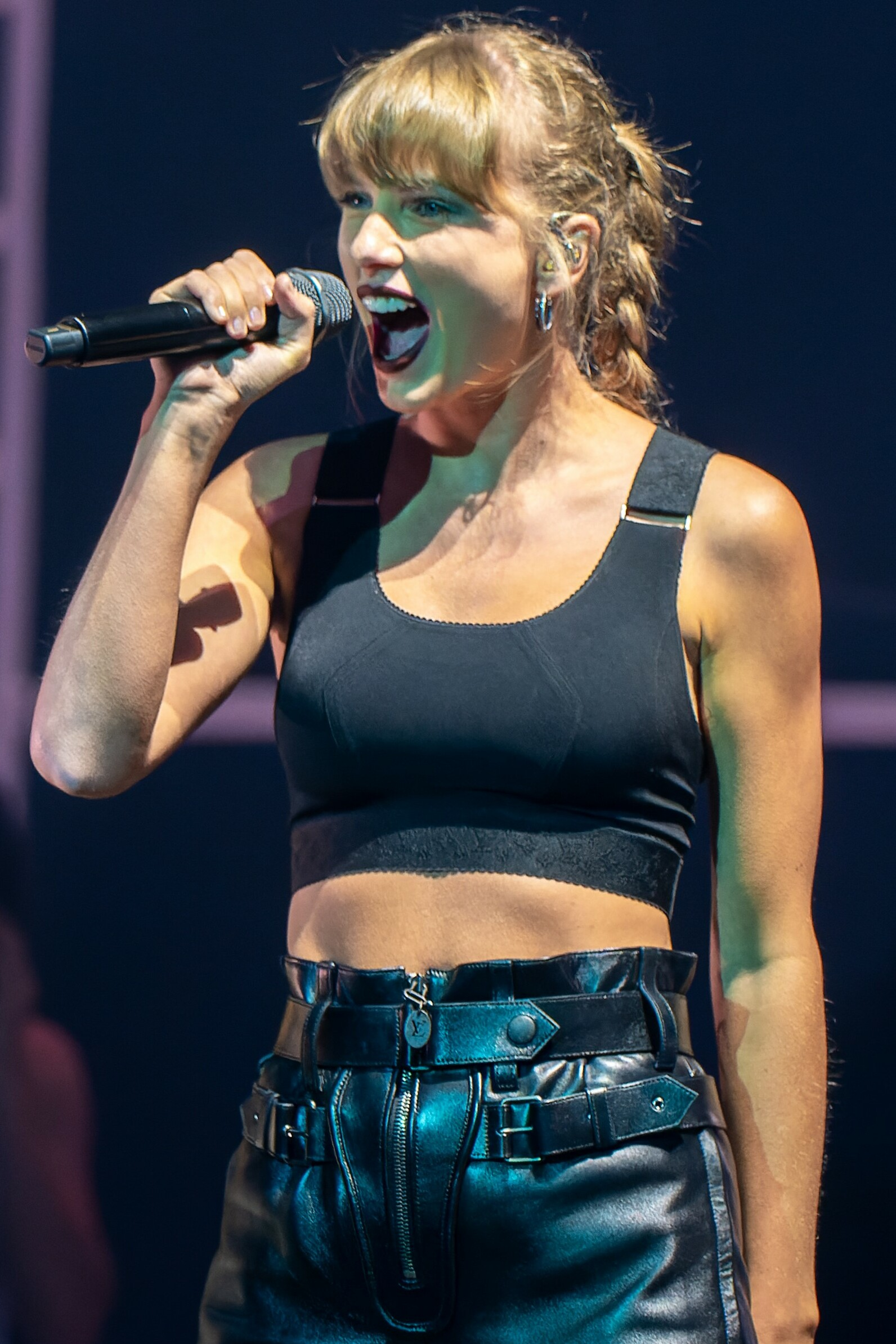
Swift performing in 2022

The American singer-songwriter Taylor Swift has written or co-written every song in her twelve-album discography, except for several cover versions and guest features. She has also written standalone singles, songs for film soundtracks, and songs recorded by other artists.

Swift signed a publishing contract with Sony/ATV Tree Music Publishing to become a professional songwriter in 2005. She signed with Big Machine Records in 2005, and the label released her first six studio albums until the contract expired in 2018. Her early-career songwriting featured collaborations with Liz Rose, who co-wrote with Swift for the albums Taylor Swift (2006), Fearless (2008), and Red (2012). She was the sole writer of the majority of Fearless and Red, and wrote her third studio album, Speak Now (2010), entirely herself. Promoted to country radio, these four albums incorporate mainstream pop and rock elements, and some Red songs feature electronic and hip-hop influences. She recalibrated her artistry from country to pop with her fifth studio album, 1989 (2014), which includes writing collaborations with Jack Antonoff, Max Martin, and Shellback. The three writers-producers worked with Swift again on her sixth studio album, Reputation (2017).

Swift signed with Republic Records in 2018 and has worked with Antonoff on every album she released thereafter. Her first album under Republic, Lover (2019), is a pop album that features collaborations with Ryan Tedder, Joel Little, Louis Bell, and Frank Dukes. In 2020, Swift signed a new publishing deal with Universal Music Publishing Group and released two albums, Folklore and Evermore, which both incorporate indie folk. Folklore and Evermore contain collaborations with Aaron Dessner, who became a frequent collaborator with Swift on subsequent albums, Midnights (2022) and The Tortured Poets Department (2024), both of which have a synth-pop sound. Swift's former boyfriend, the actor Joe Alwyn, co-wrote several songs with her for Folklore, Evermore, and Midnights. For her twelfth studio album, The Life of a Showgirl (2025), and its 2026 reissue subtitled The Encore, Swift co-wrote and co-produced every track with Martin and Shellback.

Swift's departure from Big Machine resulted in a public dispute over the ownership of her first six albums in 2019, and she re-recorded them to claim ownership of their master recordings. From 2021 to 2023, she released four re-recorded albums—Fearless (Taylor's Version), Red (Taylor's Version), Speak Now (Taylor's Version), and 1989 (Taylor's Version); each includes unreleased songs Swift had written but excluded from the original releases.

== Released songs ==
Key
‡	Indicates songs written solely by Taylor Swift

List of songs by name, including featured performers, writers, associated album(s), and release year(s)
Song	Artist(s)	Writer(s)	Album(s)	Release year	Ref.
"The 1"	Taylor Swift	Taylor Swift; Aaron Dessner	Folklore	2020	
"1 Step Forward, 3 Steps Back"	Olivia Rodrigo	Olivia Rodrigo; Taylor Swift; Jack Antonoff	Sour	2021	
"22"	Taylor Swift	Taylor Swift; Max Martin; Shellback	Red and Red (Taylor's Version)	2012 and 2021	
"Actually Romantic"	Taylor Swift	Taylor Swift; Max Martin; Shellback	The Life of a Showgirl	2025	
"Afterglow"	Taylor Swift	Taylor Swift; Louis Bell; Adam King Feeney	Lover	2019	
"The Albatross"	Taylor Swift	Taylor Swift; Aaron Dessner	The Tortured Poets Department: The Anthology	2024	
"The Alchemy"	Taylor Swift	Taylor Swift; Jack Antonoff	The Tortured Poets Department	2024	
"The Alcott"	The National featuring Taylor Swift	Matt Berninger; Aaron Dessner; Taylor Swift	First Two Pages of Frankenstein	2023	
"All of the Girls You Loved Before"	Taylor Swift	Taylor Swift; Louis Bell; Adam King Feeney	Non-album song	2023	
"All Too Well"	Taylor Swift	Taylor Swift; Liz Rose	Red and Red (Taylor's Version)	2012 and 2021	
"All Too Well (10 Minute Version)"	Taylor Swift	Taylor Swift; Liz Rose	Red (Taylor's Version)	2021	
"All You Had to Do Was Stay"	Taylor Swift	Taylor Swift; Max Martin	1989 and 1989 (Taylor's Version)	2014 and 2023	
"American Girl"	Taylor Swift	Tom Petty	Non-album song	2009	
"Anti-Hero"	Taylor Swift	Taylor Swift; Jack Antonoff	Midnights	2022	
"The Archer"	Taylor Swift	Taylor Swift; Jack Antonoff	Lover	2019	
"August"	Taylor Swift	Taylor Swift; Jack Antonoff	Folklore	2020	
"Babe"	Sugarland featuring Taylor Swift	Taylor Swift; Pat Monahan	Bigger (Note: "Babe" was first recorded and released by Sugarland in 2018, before Swift re-recorded it as "Babe (Taylor's Version)" for her 2021 album Red (Taylor's Version).)	2018 and 2021	
"Baby" (live cover of "Baby, Don't You Break My Heart Slow")	Taylor Swift	Vonda Shepard; James Newton Howard	Napster Live	2006	
"Babylon"	Taylor Swift	Taylor Swift; Max Martin; Shellback	The Life of a Showgirl: The Encore	2026	
"Back to December"	Taylor Swift	Taylor Swift ‡	Speak Now and Speak Now (Taylor's Version)	2010 and 2023	
"Bad Blood"	Taylor Swift	Taylor Swift; Max Martin; Shellback	1989 and 1989 (Taylor's Version)	2014 and 2023	
"Bad Blood" (single version)	Taylor Swift featuring Kendrick Lamar	Taylor Swift; Max Martin; Shellback; Kendrick Lamar	Non-album song (Note: The re-recording, "Bad Blood (featuring Kendrick Lamar) (Taylor's Version)", was included on the deluxe edition of 1989 (Taylor's Version) (2023).)	2015 and 2023	
"Beautiful Eyes"	Taylor Swift	Taylor Swift ‡	Beautiful Eyes	2008	
"Beautiful Ghosts"	Taylor Swift	Taylor Swift; Andrew Lloyd Webber	Cats: Highlights from the Motion Picture Soundtrack	2019	
"Begin Again"	Taylor Swift	Taylor Swift ‡	Red and Red (Taylor's Version)	2012 and 2021	
"Bein' With My Baby"	Shea Fisher	Taylor Swift; Brett Beavers	Shea	2009	
"Bejeweled"	Taylor Swift	Taylor Swift; Jack Antonoff	Midnights	2022	
"The Best Day"	Taylor Swift	Taylor Swift ‡	Fearless and Fearless (Taylor's Version)	2008 and 2021	
"Best Days of Your Life"	Kellie Pickler	Kellie Pickler; Taylor Swift	Kellie Pickler	2008	
"Bette Davis Eyes"	Taylor Swift	Donna Weiss; Jackie DeShannon	Speak Now World Tour – Live	2011	
"Better Man"	Little Big Town	Taylor Swift ‡	The Breaker (Note: "Better Man" was first recorded and released by Little Big Town in 2016, before Swift re-recorded it as "Better Man (Taylor's Version)" for her 2021 album Red (Taylor's Version).)	2016 and 2021	
"Better than Revenge"	Taylor Swift	Taylor Swift ‡	Speak Now and Speak Now (Taylor's Version)	2010 and 2023	
"Betty"	Taylor Swift	Taylor Swift; William Bowery	Folklore	2020	
"Big Star (Live)"	Kenny Chesney and Taylor Swift	Stephony Smith	Live in No Shoes Nation	2017	
"Bigger Than the Whole Sky"	Taylor Swift	Taylor Swift ‡	Midnights (3am Edition)	2022	
"Birch"	Big Red Machine featuring Taylor Swift	Aaron Dessner; Bryan Devendorf; Justin Vernon	How Long Do You Think It's Gonna Last?	2021	
"The Black Dog"	Taylor Swift	Taylor Swift ‡	The Tortured Poets Department: The Anthology	2024	
"Blank Space"	Taylor Swift	Taylor Swift; Max Martin; Shellback	1989 and 1989 (Taylor's Version)	2014 and 2023	
"The Bolter"	Taylor Swift	Taylor Swift; Aaron Dessner	The Tortured Poets Department: The Anthology	2024	
"Both of Us"	B.o.B featuring Taylor Swift	Bobby Ray Simmons, Jr. Taylor Swift; Ammar Malik; Lukasz Gottwald; Henry Walter	Strange Clouds	2012	
"Breathe"	Taylor Swift featuring Colbie Caillat	Taylor Swift; Colbie Caillat	Fearless and Fearless (Taylor's Version)	2008 and 2021	
"Breathless"	Taylor Swift	Kevin Griffin	Hope for Haiti Now	2010	
"But Daddy I Love Him"	Taylor Swift	Taylor Swift; Aaron Dessner	The Tortured Poets Department	2024	
"Bye Bye Baby"	Taylor Swift	Taylor Swift; Liz Rose	Fearless (Taylor's Version)	2021	
"Call It What You Want"	Taylor Swift	Taylor Swift; Jack Antonoff	Reputation	2017	
"Cancelled!"	Taylor Swift	Taylor Swift; Max Martin; Shellback	The Life of a Showgirl	2025	
"Cardigan"	Taylor Swift	Taylor Swift; Aaron Dessner	Folklore	2020	
"Carolina"	Taylor Swift	Taylor Swift ‡	Where the Crawdads Sing (Original Motion Picture Soundtrack)	2022	
"Cassandra"	Taylor Swift	Taylor Swift; Aaron Dessner	The Tortured Poets Department: The Anthology	2024	
"Castles Crumbling"	Taylor Swift featuring Hayley Williams	Taylor Swift ‡	Speak Now (Taylor's Version)	2023	
"Champagne Problems"	Taylor Swift	Taylor Swift; William Bowery	Evermore	2020	
"Change"	Taylor Swift	Taylor Swift ‡	AT&T Team USA Soundtrack, Fearless, and Fearless (Taylor's Version)	2008 and 2021	
"Chloe or Sam or Sophia or Marcus"	Taylor Swift	Taylor Swift; Aaron Dessner	The Tortured Poets Department: The Anthology	2024	
"Christmas Must Be Something More"	Taylor Swift	Taylor Swift ‡	The Taylor Swift Holiday Collection	2007	
"Christmas Tree Farm"	Taylor Swift	Taylor Swift ‡	Non-album song	2019 and 2021	
"Christmases When You Were Mine"	Taylor Swift	Taylor Swift; Liz Rose; Nathan Chapman	The Taylor Swift Holiday Collection	2007	
"Clara Bow"	Taylor Swift	Taylor Swift; Aaron Dessner	The Tortured Poets Department	2024	
"Clean"	Taylor Swift	Taylor Swift; Imogen Heap	1989 and 1989 (Taylor's Version)	2014 and 2023	
"Cleveland!"	Taylor Swift	Taylor Swift; Max Martin; Shellback	The Life of a Showgirl: The Encore	2026	
"Closure"	Taylor Swift	Taylor Swift; Aaron Dessner	Evermore	2020	
"Cold as You"	Taylor Swift	Taylor Swift; Liz Rose	Taylor Swift	2006	
"Come Back... Be Here"	Taylor Swift	Taylor Swift; Dan Wilson	Red (Deluxe) and Red (Taylor's Version)	2012 and 2021	
"Come in with the Rain"	Taylor Swift	Taylor Swift; Liz Rose	Fearless: Platinum Edition and Fearless (Taylor's Version)	2009 and 2021	
"Coney Island"	Taylor Swift featuring the National	Taylor Swift; Aaron Dessner; Bryce Dessner; William Bowery	Evermore	2020	
"Cornelia Street"	Taylor Swift	Taylor Swift ‡	Lover	2019	
"Cowboy like Me"	Taylor Swift	Taylor Swift; Aaron Dessner	Evermore	2020	
"Crazier"	Taylor Swift	Taylor Swift; Robert Ellis Orrall	Hannah Montana: The Movie	2009	
"Cruel Summer"	Taylor Swift	Taylor Swift; Jack Antonoff; Annie Clark	Lover	2019	
"Dancing with Our Hands Tied"	Taylor Swift	Taylor Swift; Max Martin; Shellback; Oscar Holter	Reputation	2017	
"Daylight"	Taylor Swift	Taylor Swift ‡	Lover	2019	
"Dear John"	Taylor Swift	Taylor Swift ‡	Speak Now and Speak Now (Taylor's Version)	2010 and 2023	
"Dear Reader"	Taylor Swift	Taylor Swift; Jack Antonoff	Midnights (3am Edition)	2022	
"Death by a Thousand Cuts"	Taylor Swift	Taylor Swift; Jack Antonoff	Lover	2019	
"Deja Vu"	Olivia Rodrigo	Olivia Rodrigo; Dan Nigro; Taylor Swift; Jack Antonoff; Annie Clark	Sour	2021	
"Delicate"	Taylor Swift	Taylor Swift; Max Martin; Shellback	Reputation	2017	
"Don't Blame Me"	Taylor Swift	Taylor Swift; Max Martin; Shellback	Reputation	2017	
"Don't You"	Taylor Swift	Taylor Swift; Tommy Lee James	Fearless (Taylor's Version)	2021	
"Dorothea"	Taylor Swift	Taylor Swift; Aaron Dessner	Evermore	2020	
"Down Bad"	Taylor Swift	Taylor Swift; Jack Antonoff	The Tortured Poets Department	2024	
"Dress"	Taylor Swift	Taylor Swift; Jack Antonoff	Reputation	2017	
"Drops of Jupiter (Live)"	Taylor Swift	Charlie Colin; Rob Hotchkiss; Jimmy Stafford; Pat Monahan; Scott Underwood	Speak Now World Tour – Live	2011	
"Eldest Daughter"	Taylor Swift	Taylor Swift; Max Martin; Shellback	The Life of a Showgirl	2025	
"Electric Touch"	Taylor Swift featuring Fall Out Boy	Taylor Swift ‡	Speak Now (Taylor's Version)	2023	
"Elizabeth Taylor"	Taylor Swift	Taylor Swift; Max Martin; Shellback	The Life of a Showgirl	2025	
"Enchanted"	Taylor Swift	Taylor Swift ‡	Speak Now and Speak Now (Taylor's Version)	2010 and 2023	
"End Game"	Taylor Swift featuring Ed Sheeran and Future	Taylor Swift; Max Martin; Shellback; Ed Sheeran; Nayvadius Wilburn	Reputation	2017	
"Epiphany"	Taylor Swift	Taylor Swift; Aaron Dessner	Folklore	2020	
"Evermore"	Taylor Swift featuring Bon Iver	Taylor Swift; Justin Vernon; William Bowery	Evermore	2020	
"Everything Has Changed"	Taylor Swift featuring Ed Sheeran	Taylor Swift; Ed Sheeran	Red and Red (Taylor's Version)	2012 and 2021	
"Exile"	Taylor Swift featuring Bon Iver	Taylor Swift; Justin Vernon; William Bowery	Folklore	2020	
"Eyes Open"	Taylor Swift	Taylor Swift ‡	The Hunger Games (Note: The 2023 re-recording, "Eyes Open (Taylor's Version)", was released without being included on any album.)	2012 and 2023	
"False God"	Taylor Swift	Taylor Swift; Jack Antonoff	Lover	2019	
"The Fate of Ophelia"	Taylor Swift	Taylor Swift; Max Martin; Shellback	The Life of a Showgirl	2025	
"Father Figure"	Taylor Swift	Taylor Swift; Max Martin; Shellback; George Michael	The Life of a Showgirl	2025	
"Fearless"	Taylor Swift	Taylor Swift; Liz Rose; Hillary Lindsey	Fearless and Fearless (Taylor's Version)	2008 and 2021	
"Fifteen"	Taylor Swift	Taylor Swift ‡	Fearless and Fearless (Taylor's Version)	2008 and 2021	
"Florida!!!"	Taylor Swift featuring Florence and the Machine	Taylor Swift; Florence Welch	The Tortured Poets Department	2024	
"Foolish One"	Taylor Swift	Taylor Swift ‡	Speak Now (Taylor's Version)	2023	
"Forever & Always"	Taylor Swift	Taylor Swift ‡	Fearless and Fearless (Taylor's Version)	2008 and 2021	
"Forever Winter"	Taylor Swift	Taylor Swift; Mark Foster	Red (Taylor's Version)	2021	
"Fortnight"	Taylor Swift featuring Post Malone	Taylor Swift; Jack Antonoff; Austin Post	The Tortured Poets Department	2024	
"Fresh Out the Slammer"	Taylor Swift	Taylor Swift; Jack Antonoff	The Tortured Poets Department	2024	
"Gasoline"	Haim and Taylor Swift	Danielle Haim; Este Haim; Alana Haim; Rostam Batmanglij; Ariel Rechtshaid	Women in Music Pt. III (Expanded edition)	2021	
"Getaway Car"	Taylor Swift	Taylor Swift; Jack Antonoff	Reputation	2017	
"Girl at Home"	Taylor Swift	Taylor Swift ‡	Red (Deluxe) and Red (Taylor's Version)	2012 and 2021	
"Glitch"	Taylor Swift	Taylor Swift; Jack Antonoff; Mark Spears; Sam Dew	Midnights (3am Edition)	2022	
"Gold Rush"	Taylor Swift	Taylor Swift; Jack Antonoff	Evermore	2020	
"Gorgeous"	Taylor Swift	Taylor Swift; Max Martin; Shellback	Reputation	2017	
"The Great War"	Taylor Swift	Taylor Swift; Aaron Dessner	Midnights (3am Edition)	2022	
"Guilty as Sin?"	Taylor Swift	Taylor Swift; Jack Antonoff	The Tortured Poets Department	2024	
"Half of My Heart"	John Mayer featuring Taylor Swift	John Mayer	Battle Studies	2009	
"Happiness"	Taylor Swift	Taylor Swift; Aaron Dessner	Evermore	2020	
"Haunted"	Taylor Swift	Taylor Swift ‡	Speak Now and Speak Now (Taylor's Version)	2010 and 2023	
"Hey Stephen"	Taylor Swift	Taylor Swift ‡	Fearless and Fearless (Taylor's Version)	2008 and 2021	
"High Infidelity"	Taylor Swift	Taylor Swift; Aaron Dessner	Midnights (3am Edition)	2022	
"Highway Don't Care"	Tim McGraw and Taylor Swift featuring Keith Urban	Mark Irwin; Josh Kear; Brad Warren; Brett Warren	Two Lanes of Freedom	2013	
"Hits Different"	Taylor Swift	Taylor Swift; Jack Antonoff; Aaron Dessner	Midnights (Til Dawn Edition)	2022	
"Hoax"	Taylor Swift	Taylor Swift; Aaron Dessner	Folklore	2020	
"Hold On"	Jack Ingram featuring Taylor Swift	Blu Sanders	Rhapsody Originals	2007	
"Holy Ground"	Taylor Swift	Taylor Swift ‡	Red and Red (Taylor's Version)	2012 and 2021	
"Honey"	Taylor Swift	Taylor Swift; Max Martin; Shellback	The Life of a Showgirl	2025	
"How Did It End?"	Taylor Swift	Taylor Swift; Aaron Dessner	The Tortured Poets Department: The Anthology	2024	
"How You Get the Girl"	Taylor Swift	Taylor Swift; Max Martin; Shellback	1989 and 1989 (Taylor's Version)	2014 and 2023	
"I Almost Do"	Taylor Swift	Taylor Swift ‡	Red and Red (Taylor's Version)	2012 and 2021	
"I Bet You Think About Me"	Taylor Swift featuring Chris Stapleton	Taylor Swift; Lori McKenna	Red (Taylor's Version)	2021	
"I Can Do It with a Broken Heart"	Taylor Swift	Taylor Swift; Jack Antonoff	The Tortured Poets Department	2024	
"I Can Fix Him (No Really I Can)"	Taylor Swift	Taylor Swift; Jack Antonoff	The Tortured Poets Department	2024	
"I Can See You"	Taylor Swift	Taylor Swift ‡	Speak Now (Taylor's Version)	2023	
"I Did Something Bad"	Taylor Swift	Taylor Swift; Max Martin; Shellback	Reputation	2017	
"I Don't Wanna Live Forever"	Zayn and Taylor Swift	Taylor Swift; Sam Dew; Jack Antonoff	Fifty Shades Darker: Original Motion Picture Soundtrack	2016	
"I Forgot That You Existed"	Taylor Swift	Taylor Swift; Louis Bell; Adam King Feeney	Lover	2019	
"I Hate It Here"	Taylor Swift	Taylor Swift; Aaron Dessner	The Tortured Poets Department: The Anthology	2024	
"I Heart ?"	Taylor Swift	Taylor Swift ‡	Beautiful Eyes	2008	
"I Knew It, I Knew You"	Taylor Swift	Taylor Swift; Jack Antonoff	Toy Story 5 (Original Motion Picture Soundtrack)	2026	
"I Knew You Were Trouble"	Taylor Swift	Taylor Swift; Max Martin; Shellback	Red and Red (Taylor's Version)	2012 and 2021	
"I Know Places"	Taylor Swift	Taylor Swift; Ryan Tedder	1989 and 1989 (Taylor's Version)	2014 and 2023	
"I Look in People's Windows"	Taylor Swift	Taylor Swift; Jack Antonoff; Patrik Berger	The Tortured Poets Department: The Anthology	2024	
"I Think He Knows"	Taylor Swift	Taylor Swift; Jack Antonoff	Lover	2019	
"I Want You Back"	Taylor Swift	Freddie Perren; Deke Richards; Berry Gordy Jr. Alphonso Mizell	Speak Now World Tour – Live	2011	
"I Wish You Would"	Taylor Swift	Taylor Swift; Jack Antonoff	1989 and 1989 (Taylor's Version)	2014 and 2023	
"If This Was a Movie"	Taylor Swift	Taylor Swift; Martin Johnson	Speak Now (Deluxe) (Note: The 2023 re-recording, "If This Was a Movie (Taylor's Version)", was released without being included on any album.)	2010 and 2023	
"Illicit Affairs"	Taylor Swift	Taylor Swift; Jack Antonoff	Folklore	2020	
"I'm Only Me When I'm with You"	Taylor Swift	Taylor Swift; Robert Ellis Orrall; Angelo Petraglia	Taylor Swift (Deluxe)	2007	
"Imgonnagetyouback"	Taylor Swift	Taylor Swift; Jack Antonoff	The Tortured Poets Department: The Anthology	2024	
"Innocent"	Taylor Swift	Taylor Swift ‡	Speak Now and Speak Now (Taylor's Version)	2010 and 2023	
"Invisible"	Taylor Swift	Taylor Swift; Robert Ellis Orrall	Taylor Swift (Deluxe)	2007	
"Invisible String"	Taylor Swift	Taylor Swift; Aaron Dessner	Folklore	2020	
"Is It Over Now?"	Taylor Swift	Taylor Swift; Jack Antonoff	1989 (Taylor's Version)	2023	
"It's Nice to Have a Friend"	Taylor Swift	Taylor Swift; Louis Bell; Adam King Feeney	Lover	2019	
"It's Time to Go"	Taylor Swift	Taylor Swift; Aaron Dessner	Evermore (Deluxe)	2020	
"Ivy"	Taylor Swift	Taylor Swift; Jack Antonoff; Aaron Dessner	Evermore	2020	
"The Joker and the Queen" (single version)	Ed Sheeran featuring Taylor Swift	Ed Sheeran; Taylor Swift; Johnny McDaid; Fred Gibson; Sam Roman	= (Tour Edition)	2022	
"Jump Then Fall"	Taylor Swift	Taylor Swift ‡	Fearless: Platinum Edition and Fearless (Taylor's Version)	2009 and 2021	
"Karma"	Taylor Swift	Taylor Swift; Jack Antonoff; Mark Spears; Jahaan Sweet; Keanu Torres	Midnights	2022	
"Karma" (remixed version)	Taylor Swift featuring Ice Spice	Taylor Swift; Jack Antonoff; Mark Spears; Jahaan Sweet; Keanu Torres; Isis Gaston; Ephrem Lopez	Midnights (The Til Dawn and The Late Night editions)	2023	
"King of My Heart"	Taylor Swift	Taylor Swift; Max Martin; Shellback	Reputation	2017	
"Labyrinth"	Taylor Swift	Taylor Swift; Jack Antonoff	Midnights	2022	
"The Lakes"	Taylor Swift	Taylor Swift; Jack Antonoff	Folklore (Deluxe)	2020	
"Last Christmas"	Taylor Swift	George Michael	The Taylor Swift Holiday Collection	2007	
"The Last Great American Dynasty"	Taylor Swift	Taylor Swift; Aaron Dessner	Folklore	2020	
"Last Kiss"	Taylor Swift	Taylor Swift ‡	Speak Now and Speak Now (Taylor's Version)	2010 and 2023	
"The Last Time"	Taylor Swift featuring Gary Lightbody of Snow Patrol	Taylor Swift; Gary Lightbody; Jacknife Lee	Red and Red (Taylor's Version)	2012 and 2021	
"Lavender Haze"	Taylor Swift	Taylor Swift; Jack Antonoff; Zoë Kravitz; Mark Spears; Jahaan Sweet; Sam Dew	Midnights	2022	
"The Life of a Showgirl"	Taylor Swift featuring Sabrina Carpenter	Taylor Swift; Max Martin; Shellback	The Life of a Showgirl	2025	
"Loml"	Taylor Swift	Taylor Swift; Aaron Dessner	The Tortured Poets Department	2024	
"London Boy"	Taylor Swift	Taylor Swift; Jack Antonoff; Mark Spears; Cautious Clay	Lover	2019	
"Long Live"	Taylor Swift	Taylor Swift ‡	Speak Now and Speak Now (Taylor's Version)	2010 and 2023	
"Long Live" (Brazilian version)	Taylor Swift featuring Paula Fernandes	Taylor Swift; Paula Fernandes	Speak Now World Tour – Live	2012	
"Long Story Short"	Taylor Swift	Taylor Swift; Aaron Dessner	Evermore	2020	
"Look What You Made Me Do"	Taylor Swift	Taylor Swift; Jack Antonoff; Fred Fairbrass; Richard Fairbrass; Rob Manzoli	Reputation	2017	
"Love Story"	Taylor Swift	Taylor Swift ‡	Fearless and Fearless (Taylor's Version)	2008 and 2021	
"Lover"	Taylor Swift	Taylor Swift ‡	Lover	2019	
"Lover (Remix)"	Taylor Swift featuring Shawn Mendes	Taylor Swift; Shawn Mendes; Scott Harris	Non-album song	2019	
"The Lucky One"	Taylor Swift	Taylor Swift ‡	Red and Red (Taylor's Version)	2012 and 2021	
"Macavity"	Taylor Swift and Idris Elba	Andrew Lloyd Webber; T. S. Eliot	Cats: Highlights from the Motion Picture Soundtrack	2019	
"Mad Woman"	Taylor Swift	Taylor Swift; Aaron Dessner	Folklore	2020	
"The Man"	Taylor Swift	Taylor Swift; Joel Little	Lover	2019	
"The Manuscript"	Taylor Swift	Taylor Swift ‡	The Tortured Poets Department: The Anthology	2024	
"Marjorie"	Taylor Swift	Taylor Swift; Aaron Dessner	Evermore	2020	
"Maroon"	Taylor Swift	Taylor Swift; Jack Antonoff	Midnights	2022	
"Mary's Song (Oh My My My)"	Taylor Swift	Taylor Swift; Liz Rose; Brian Maher	Taylor Swift	2006	
"Mastermind"	Taylor Swift	Taylor Swift; Jack Antonoff	Midnights	2022	
"Me!"	Taylor Swift featuring Brendon Urie of Panic! at the Disco	Taylor Swift; Joel Little; Brendon Urie	Lover	2019	
"Mean"	Taylor Swift	Taylor Swift ‡	Speak Now and Speak Now (Taylor's Version)	2010 and 2023	
"Message in a Bottle"	Taylor Swift	Taylor Swift; Max Martin; Shellback	Red (Taylor's Version)	2021	
"Midnight Rain"	Taylor Swift	Taylor Swift; Jack Antonoff	Midnights	2022	
"Mine"	Taylor Swift	Taylor Swift ‡	Speak Now and Speak Now (Taylor's Version)	2010 and 2023	
"Mirrorball"	Taylor Swift	Taylor Swift; Jack Antonoff	Folklore	2020	
"Miss Americana & the Heartbreak Prince"	Taylor Swift	Taylor Swift; Joel Little	Lover	2019	
"The Moment I Knew"	Taylor Swift	Taylor Swift ‡	Red (Deluxe) and Red (Taylor's Version)	2012 and 2021	
"Mr. Perfectly Fine"	Taylor Swift	Taylor Swift ‡	Fearless (Taylor's Version)	2021	
"My Boy Only Breaks His Favorite Toys"	Taylor Swift	Taylor Swift ‡	The Tortured Poets Department	2024	
"My Tears Ricochet"	Taylor Swift	Taylor Swift ‡	Folklore	2020	
"Never Grow Up"	Taylor Swift	Taylor Swift ‡	Speak Now and Speak Now (Taylor's Version)	2010 and 2023	
"New Romantics"	Taylor Swift	Taylor Swift; Max Martin; Shellback	1989 (Deluxe) and 1989 (Taylor's Version)	2014 and 2023	
"New Year's Day"	Taylor Swift	Taylor Swift; Jack Antonoff	Reputation	2017	
"No Body, No Crime"	Taylor Swift featuring Haim	Taylor Swift ‡	Evermore	2020	
"Nothing New"	Taylor Swift featuring Phoebe Bridgers	Taylor Swift ‡	Red (Taylor's Version)	2021	
"Now That We Don't Talk"	Taylor Swift	Taylor Swift; Jack Antonoff	1989 (Taylor's Version)	2023	
"Only the Young"	Taylor Swift	Taylor Swift; Joel Little	Non-album song	2020	
"Opalite"	Taylor Swift	Taylor Swift; Max Martin; Shellback	The Life of a Showgirl	2025	
"The Other Side of the Door"	Taylor Swift	Taylor Swift ‡	Fearless: Platinum Edition and Fearless (Taylor's Version)	2009 and 2021	
"Our Song"	Taylor Swift	Taylor Swift ‡	Taylor Swift	2006	
"Ours"	Taylor Swift	Taylor Swift ‡	Speak Now (Deluxe) and Speak Now (Taylor's Version)	2010 and 2023	
"Out of the Woods"	Taylor Swift	Taylor Swift; Jack Antonoff	1989 and 1989 (Taylor's Version)	2014 and 2023	
"The Outside"	Taylor Swift	Taylor Swift ‡	Taylor Swift	2006	
"Paper Rings"	Taylor Swift	Taylor Swift; Jack Antonoff	Lover	2019	
"Paris"	Taylor Swift	Taylor Swift; Jack Antonoff	Midnights (3am Edition)	2022	
"Patient Zero"	Taylor Swift	Taylor Swift; Max Martin; Shellback	The Life of a Showgirl: The Encore	2026	
"Peace"	Taylor Swift	Taylor Swift; Aaron Dessner	Folklore	2020	
"A Perfectly Good Heart"	Taylor Swift	Taylor Swift; Brett James; Troy Verges	Taylor Swift (Deluxe)	2007	
"Peter"	Taylor Swift	Taylor Swift ‡	The Tortured Poets Department: The Anthology	2024	
"Picture to Burn"	Taylor Swift	Taylor Swift; Liz Rose	Taylor Swift	2006	
"Pink Clouding"	Taylor Swift	Taylor Swift; Max Martin; Shellback	The Life of a Showgirl: The Encore	2026	
"A Place in This World"	Taylor Swift	Taylor Swift; Robert Ellis Orrall; Angelo Petraglia	Taylor Swift	2006	
"The Prophecy"	Taylor Swift	Taylor Swift; Aaron Dessner	The Tortured Poets Department: The Anthology	2024	
"Question...?"	Taylor Swift	Taylor Swift; Jack Antonoff	Midnights	2022	
"...Ready for It?"	Taylor Swift	Taylor Swift; Max Martin; Shellback; Ali Payami	Reputation	2017	
"Red"	Taylor Swift	Taylor Swift ‡	Red and Red (Taylor's Version)	2012 and 2021	
"Renegade"	Big Red Machine featuring Taylor Swift	Aaron Dessner; Taylor Swift	How Long Do You Think It's Gonna Last?	2021	
"Right Where You Left Me"	Taylor Swift	Taylor Swift; Aaron Dessner	Evermore (Deluxe)	2020	
"Robin"	Taylor Swift	Taylor Swift; Aaron Dessner	The Tortured Poets Department: The Anthology	2024	
"Ronan"	Taylor Swift	Taylor Swift; Maya Thompson	Non-album song (Note: The re-recording, "Ronan (Taylor's Version)", was released as part of the 2021 album Red (Taylor's Version).)	2012 and 2021	
"Ruin the Friendship"	Taylor Swift	Taylor Swift; Max Martin; Shellback	The Life of a Showgirl	2025	
"Run"	Taylor Swift featuring Ed Sheeran	Taylor Swift; Ed Sheeran	Red (Taylor's Version)	2021	
"Sad Beautiful Tragic"	Taylor Swift	Taylor Swift ‡	Red and Red (Taylor's Version)	2012 and 2021	
"Safe & Sound"	Taylor Swift featuring the Civil Wars	Taylor Swift; Joy Williams; John Paul White; T Bone Burnett	The Hunger Games (Note: The 2023 re-recording, "Safe & Sound (Taylor's Version)", was released without being included on any album. It features Joy Williams and John Paul White, members of the defunct Civil Wars, separately.)	2011 and 2023	
"Santa Baby"	Taylor Swift	Joan Javits; Philip Springer; Tony Springer	The Taylor Swift Holiday Collection	2007	
"Say Don't Go"	Taylor Swift	Taylor Swift; Diane Warren	1989 (Taylor's Version)	2023	
"September"	Taylor Swift	Maurice White; Al McKay; Allee Willis	Spotify Singles	2018	
"Seven"	Taylor Swift	Taylor Swift; Aaron Dessner	Folklore	2020	
"Shake It Off"	Taylor Swift	Taylor Swift; Max Martin; Shellback	1989 and 1989 (Taylor's Version)	2014 and 2023	
"Should've Said No"	Taylor Swift	Taylor Swift ‡	Taylor Swift	2006	
"Silent Night"	Taylor Swift	Josef Mohr; Franz Xaver Gruber	The Taylor Swift Holiday Collection	2007	
"'Slut!'"	Taylor Swift	Taylor Swift; Jack Antonoff; Patrik Berger	1989 (Taylor's Version)	2023	
"The Smallest Man Who Ever Lived"	Taylor Swift	Taylor Swift; Aaron Dessner	The Tortured Poets Department	2024	
"Snow on the Beach"	Taylor Swift featuring Lana Del Rey	Taylor Swift; Lana Del Rey; Jack Antonoff	Midnights	2022	
"So High School"	Taylor Swift	Taylor Swift; Aaron Dessner	The Tortured Poets Department: The Anthology	2024	
"So It Goes..."	Taylor Swift	Taylor Swift; Max Martin; Shellback; Oscar Görres	Reputation	2017	
"So Long, London"	Taylor Swift	Taylor Swift; Aaron Dessner	The Tortured Poets Department	2024	
"Soon You'll Get Better"	Taylor Swift featuring the Dixie Chicks	Taylor Swift; Jack Antonoff	Lover	2019	
"Sparks Fly"	Taylor Swift	Taylor Swift ‡	Speak Now and Speak Now (Taylor's Version)	2010 and 2023	
"Speak Now"	Taylor Swift	Taylor Swift ‡	Speak Now and Speak Now (Taylor's Version)	2010 and 2023	
"Starlight"	Taylor Swift	Taylor Swift ‡	Red and Red (Taylor's Version)	2012 and 2021	
"State of Grace"	Taylor Swift	Taylor Swift ‡	Red and Red (Taylor's Version)	2012 and 2021	
"Stay Beautiful"	Taylor Swift	Taylor Swift; Liz Rose	Taylor Swift	2006	
"Stay Stay Stay"	Taylor Swift	Taylor Swift ‡	Red and Red (Taylor's Version)	2012 and 2021	
"The Story of Us"	Taylor Swift	Taylor Swift ‡	Speak Now and Speak Now (Taylor's Version)	2010 and 2023	
"Style"	Taylor Swift	Taylor Swift; Max Martin; Shellback; Ali Payami	1989 and 1989 (Taylor's Version)	2014 and 2023	
"Suburban Legends"	Taylor Swift	Taylor Swift; Jack Antonoff	1989 (Taylor's Version)	2023	
"Superman"	Taylor Swift	Taylor Swift ‡	Speak Now (Deluxe) and Speak Now (Taylor's Version)	2010 and 2023	
"Superstar"	Taylor Swift	Taylor Swift; Liz Rose	Fearless: Platinum Edition and Fearless (Taylor's Version)	2009 and 2021	
"Sweet Nothing"	Taylor Swift	Taylor Swift; William Bowery	Midnights	2022	
"Sweeter than Fiction"	Taylor Swift	Taylor Swift; Jack Antonoff	One Chance and 1989 (Taylor's Version) (Tangerine Edition)	2013 and 2023	
"Teardrops on My Guitar"	Taylor Swift	Taylor Swift; Liz Rose	Taylor Swift	2006	
"Tell Me Why"	Taylor Swift	Taylor Swift; Liz Rose	Fearless and Fearless (Taylor's Version)	2008 and 2021	
"Thank You Aimee"	Taylor Swift	Taylor Swift; Aaron Dessner	The Tortured Poets Department: The Anthology	2024	
"That's When"	Taylor Swift featuring Keith Urban	Taylor Swift; Brad Warren; Brett Warren	Fearless (Taylor's Version)	2021	
"This Is Me Trying"	Taylor Swift	Taylor Swift; Jack Antonoff	Folklore	2020	
"This Is What You Came For"	Calvin Harris featuring Rihanna	Calvin Harris; Taylor Swift (Note: Swift was initially credited under the pseudonym Nils Sjöberg)	96 Months	2016	
"This Is Why We Can't Have Nice Things"	Taylor Swift	Taylor Swift; Jack Antonoff	Reputation	2017	
"This Love"	Taylor Swift	Taylor Swift ‡	1989 and 1989 (Taylor's Version)	2014 and 2022	
"Tied Together with a Smile"	Taylor Swift	Taylor Swift; Liz Rose	Taylor Swift	2006	
"Tim McGraw"	Taylor Swift	Taylor Swift; Liz Rose	Taylor Swift	2006	
"Timeless"	Taylor Swift	Taylor Swift ‡	Speak Now (Taylor's Version)	2023	
"'Tis the Damn Season"	Taylor Swift	Taylor Swift; Aaron Dessner	Evermore	2020	
"Today Was a Fairytale"	Taylor Swift	Taylor Swift ‡	Valentine's Day and Fearless (Taylor's Version)	2010 and 2021	
"Tolerate It"	Taylor Swift	Taylor Swift; Aaron Dessner	Evermore	2020	
"The Tortured Poets Department"	Taylor Swift	Taylor Swift; Jack Antonoff	The Tortured Poets Department	2024	
"Treacherous"	Taylor Swift	Taylor Swift; Dan Wilson	Red and Red (Taylor's Version)	2012 and 2021	
"Two Is Better Than One"	Boys Like Girls featuring Taylor Swift	Martin Johnson; Taylor Swift	Love Drunk	2009	
"Umbrella"	Taylor Swift	Christopher "Tricky" Stewart; Terius "Dream" Nash; Thaddis Harrell; Shawn Carter	iTunes Live from SoHo	2008	
"Untouchable"	Taylor Swift	Taylor Swift; Cary Barlowe; Nathan Barlowe; Tommy Lee James	Fearless: Platinum Edition and Fearless (Taylor's Version)	2009 and 2021	
"Us"	Gracie Abrams featuring Taylor Swift	Gracie Abrams; Taylor Swift; Aaron Dessner	The Secret of Us	2024	
"The Very First Night"	Taylor Swift	Taylor Swift; Amund Bjørklund; Espen Lind	Red (Taylor's Version)	2021	
"Vigilante Shit"	Taylor Swift	Taylor Swift ‡	Midnights	2022	
"The Way I Loved You"	Taylor Swift	Taylor Swift; John Rich	Fearless and Fearless (Taylor's Version)	2008 and 2021	
"We Are Never Ever Getting Back Together"	Taylor Swift	Taylor Swift; Max Martin; Shellback	Red and Red (Taylor's Version)	2012 and 2021	
"We Were Happy"	Taylor Swift	Taylor Swift; Liz Rose	Fearless (Taylor's Version)	2021	
"Welcome to New York"	Taylor Swift	Taylor Swift; Ryan Tedder	1989 and 1989 (Taylor's Version)	2014 and 2023	
"When Emma Falls in Love"	Taylor Swift	Taylor Swift ‡	Speak Now (Taylor's Version)	2023	
"White Christmas"	Taylor Swift	Irving Berlin	The Taylor Swift Holiday Collection	2007	
"White Horse"	Taylor Swift	Taylor Swift; Liz Rose	Fearless and Fearless (Taylor's Version)	2008 and 2021	
"Who's Afraid of Little Old Me?"	Taylor Swift	Taylor Swift ‡	The Tortured Poets Department	2024	
"Wildest Dreams"	Taylor Swift	Taylor Swift; Max Martin; Shellback	1989 and 1989 (Taylor's Version)	2014 and 2021	
"Willow"	Taylor Swift	Taylor Swift; Aaron Dessner	Evermore	2020	
"Wish List"	Taylor Swift	Taylor Swift; Max Martin; Shellback	The Life of a Showgirl	2025	
"Wonderland"	Taylor Swift	Taylor Swift; Max Martin; Shellback	1989 (Deluxe) and 1989 (Taylor's Version)	2014 and 2023	
"Wood"	Taylor Swift	Taylor Swift; Max Martin; Shellback	The Life of a Showgirl	2025	
"Would've, Could've, Should've"	Taylor Swift	Taylor Swift; Aaron Dessner	Midnights (3am Edition)	2022	
"You All Over Me"	Taylor Swift featuring Maren Morris	Taylor Swift; Scooter Carusoe	Fearless (Taylor's Version)	2021	
"You Are in Love"	Taylor Swift	Taylor Swift; Jack Antonoff	1989 (Deluxe) and 1989 (Taylor's Version)	2014 and 2023	
"You Belong with Me"	Taylor Swift	Taylor Swift; Liz Rose	Fearless and Fearless (Taylor's Version)	2008 and 2021	
"You Need to Calm Down"	Taylor Swift	Taylor Swift; Joel Little	Lover	2019	
"You'll Always Find Your Way Back Home"	Miley Cyrus	Taylor Swift; Martin Johnson	Hannah Montana: The Movie	2009	
"You're Losing Me"	Taylor Swift	Taylor Swift; Jack Antonoff	Midnights (The Late Night Edition)	2023	
"You're Not Sorry"	Taylor Swift	Taylor Swift ‡	Fearless and Fearless (Taylor's Version)	2008 and 2021	
"You're on Your Own, Kid"	Taylor Swift	Taylor Swift; Jack Antonoff	Midnights	2022	

== Unreleased songs ==
List of unreleased songs, showing writers where applicable and relevant details
Song	Writer(s)	Notes	Ref.
"Acting like a Boy"	Taylor Swift; Liz Rose	Registered by the American Society of Composers, Authors and Publishers (ASCAP); An alternate title of the song is "Aching like a Boy"	
"All Night Diner"	Taylor Swift; Liz Rose	Registered by the ASCAP	
"Am I Ready for Love"	Celina Berman-Gray	Listed on Swift's website in 2002	
"American Boy"	Taylor Swift	Registered by the ASCAP; Included on one of Swift's demo CDs from 2003	
"Angelina"	Taylor Swift	Registered by the ASCAP; Revealed in the deluxe edition notes for Swift's seventh studio album Lover (2019); Swift's diary entry from April 20, 2004, includes a mention of the song; Included on one of Swift's demo CDs from 2004	
"Baby Blue"	Unknown	Included on one of Swift's demo CDs from 2003	
"Beautiful Days"	Unknown	Included on one of Swift's demo CDs from 2003	
"Better Off"	Taylor Swift; Robert Ellis Orrall	Registered by the ASCAP	
"Bother Me"	Taylor Swift	Registered by the ASCAP	
"Brand New World"	Taylor Swift	Registered by the ASCAP; Included on one of Swift's demo CDs from 2003	
"Brought Up That Way"	Taylor Swift; Tammy Hyler	Registered by the ASCAP	
"By the Way"	Taylor Swift; Brett Beavers; Deric Ruttan	Registered by the ASCAP	
"Can I Go with You"	Taylor Swift; Greg McElrath	Listed on Swift's website in 2002	
"Check Out This View"	Taylor Swift; Liz Rose	Registered by the ASCAP	
"Closest to a Cowboy"	Taylor Swift; Sharon Vaughn	Registered by the ASCAP	
"Cross My Heart"	Taylor Swift	Registered by the ASCAP; Included on one of Swift's demo CDs from 2003	
"Dark Blue Tennessee"	Taylor Swift; Robert Ellis Orrall	Produced by Orrall; The song was first recorded in 2004 for one of Swift's demo CDs, and was recorded again during recording sessions for Swift's second studio album Fearless (2008)	
"Diary of Me"	Unknown	Recorded before the release of Swift's debut studio album Taylor Swift (2006)	
"Don't Hate Me for Loving You"	Taylor Swift	Registered by the ASCAP	
"Drama Queen"	Taylor Swift; Martin Johnson	Registered by the ASCAP	
"Fall Back on You"	Taylor Swift; Liz Rose	Registered by the ASCAP	
"Family"	Taylor Swift; Max Martin; Shellback; Oscar Holter	Registered by the ASCAP	
"Fire"	Unknown	Included on one of Swift's demo CDs from 2003	
"For You"	Taylor Swift	Registered by the ASCAP; Included on one of Swift's demo CDs from 2004; An alternate title of the song is "4 U"	
"Gail's Song"	Unknown	Included on two of Swift's demo CDs from 2003 and 2004	
"Go Slow"	Unknown	Included on one of Swift's demo CDs from 2004	
"Gracie"	Taylor Swift; Liz Rose	Registered by the ASCAP	
"Half-Way to Texas"	Unknown	Included on one of Swift's demo CDs from 2003	
"Heaven"	Unknown	Included on one of Swift's demo CDs from 2004	
"Her"	Taylor Swift; Liz Rose	Registered by the ASCAP	
"His Lies"	Taylor Swift	Registered by the ASCAP	
"Honey Baby"	Taylor Swift	Registered by the ASCAP; Included on one of Swift's demo CDs from 2003	
"Houston Rodeo"	Unknown	Included on one of Swift's demo CDs from 2003	
"I Don't Want to Lose Your Face"	Taylor Swift	Registered by the ASCAP; Included on one of Swift's demo CDs from 2004; An alternate title of the song is "Your Face"	
"I Used to Fly"	Unknown	Revealed in the deluxe edition notes for Swift's seventh studio album Lover (2019); Swift's diary entry from June 5, 2003, includes a mention of the song; Included on one of Swift's demo CDs from 2003	
"I'd Lie"	Taylor Swift	Registered by the ASCAP; Written by Swift at 16 years old for her high school talent show; The song was first recorded and subsequently leaked before Swift got a record deal with Big Machine Records, and was recorded again during recording sessions for Swift's second studio album Fearless (2008); Swift performed the song multiple times in 2006 and 2007	
"In the Pouring Rain"	Taylor Swift	Registered by the ASCAP; Included on two of Swift's demo CDs from 2003	
"Just South of Knowing Why"	Taylor Swift; Robert Ellis Orrall	Registered by the ASCAP	
"Kid in the Crowd"	Taylor Swift	Revealed in the deluxe edition notes for Swift's seventh studio album Lover (2019); One of Swift's diary entries from March 2003 includes lyrics of the song; Included on one of Swift's demo CDs from 2003	
"Let's Go"	Taylor Swift	Registered by the ASCAP; Leaked in November 2018; Speak Now (2010) outtake; Alternatively titled "Battle"	
"A Little More like You"	Unknown	Revealed in the deluxe edition notes for Swift's seventh studio album Lover (2019); Swift's diary entry from June 5, 2003, includes a mention of the song; Included on one of Swift's demo CDs from 2003	
"Live for the Little Things"	Taylor Swift	Registered by the ASCAP; Included on one of Swift's demo CDs from 2003	
"Long Time Going"	Taylor Swift; Brad Warren; Brett Warren	Registered by the ASCAP	
"Look at You like That"	Taylor Swift; Liz Rose	Registered by the ASCAP	
"Love They Haven't Thought of Yet"	Taylor Swift; Liz Rose	Registered by the ASCAP	
"Love to Lose"	Taylor Swift; Liz Rose	Registered by the ASCAP	
"Lucky You"	Taylor Swift	Registered by the ASCAP; Written by Swift at the age of 13, the first song she wrote; Swift performed the song in her 2020 documentary Miss Americana; Included on two of Swift's demo CDs from 2003	
"Made Up You"	Taylor Swift; Liz Rose	Registered by the ASCAP	
"Mandolin"	Taylor Swift	Registered by the ASCAP; Included on one of Swift's demo CDs from 2003	
"Mary Jo"	Unknown	Included on one of Swift's demo CDs from 2003	
"Matches"	Taylor Swift; Liz Rose	Registered by the ASCAP	
"Me & Britney"	Taylor Swift; Sharon Vaughn	Registered by the ASCAP	
"Missing You"	Unknown	Swift performed the song in 2007	
"My Turn to Be Me"	Unknown	Included on one of Swift's demo CDs from 2003	
"Need"	Unknown	Leaked online in February 2023	
"Need You Now"	Taylor Swift; Robert Ellis Orrall	Registered by the ASCAP	
"Never Fade"	Unknown	Included on one of Swift's demo CDs from 2003	
"Never Mind"	Taylor Swift; Liz Rose	Registered by the ASCAP	
"None of the Above"	Taylor Swift; Michael Heeney	Registered by the ASCAP	
"Not One Day"	Taylor Swift	Revealed in the deluxe edition notes for Swift's seventh studio album Lover (2019); Swift's diary entry from June 5, 2003, includes a mention of the song	
"One More Day"	Unknown	Included on one of Swift's demo CDs from 2003	
"One-Sided Goodbye"	Unknown	Included on one of Swift's demo CDs from 2003	
"Perfect Have I Loved"	Taylor Swift; Liz Rose	Registered by the ASCAP	
"Permanent Marker"	Taylor Swift; Nicolas Brophy; Jennifer Hanson	Registered by the ASCAP; Swift performed the song multiple times in 2007; Intended for Swift's second studio album Fearless (2008), but ultimately scrapped in favor of "Forever & Always"	
"Point of View"	Unknown	Included on one of Swift's demo CDs from 2003	
"Pretty Words"	Taylor Swift; Scooter Carusoe	Registered by the ASCAP	
"Rain Song"	Taylor Swift; Liz Rose; Brian Maher	Registered by the ASCAP	
"Revenge"	Unknown	Recorded before the release of Swift's debut studio album Taylor Swift (2006)	
"Ride On"	Unknown	Included on one of Swift's demo CDs from 2003	
"Same Girl"	Unknown	Revealed in the deluxe edition notes for Swift's seventh studio album Lover (2019); Swift's diary entry from June 5, 2003, includes a mention of the song; Included on one of Swift's demo CDs from 2003	
"Scream"	Taylor Swift; Randy Cantor; Jodi Horovitz	Registered by the ASCAP	
"Shaking Thrift Shop"	Taylor Swift; Ben Haggerty; Ryan Lewis; Max Martin; Karl Johan Schuster	Registered by the German society for musical performing and mechanical reproduction rights (GEMA)	
"Smokey Black Nights"	Taylor Swift	Registered by the ASCAP; Revealed in the deluxe edition notes for Swift's seventh studio album Lover (2019); Swift's diary entry from May 17, 2003, includes a mention of the song; The song was written on January 19, 2003; Swift performed the song in her 2020 documentary Miss Americana; Included on two of Swift's demo CDs from 2003	
"Someone Just Told Me"	Taylor Swift	Registered by the ASCAP	
"Someone Loves You"	Taylor Swift	Registered by the ASCAP; Revealed in the deluxe edition notes for Swift's seventh studio album Lover (2019); Swift's diary entry from February 14, 2004, includes a mention of the song; Intended for Swift's debut studio album Taylor Swift (2006); Included on one of Swift's demo CDs from 2004	
"Spinning Around"	Taylor Swift	Registered by the ASCAP; Included on one of Swift's demo CDs from 2003	
"Stupid Boy"	Taylor Swift; Liz Rose	Registered by the ASCAP	
"Sugar"	Taylor Swift	Registered by the ASCAP; Included on one of Swift's demo CDs from 2003	
"Sweet Tea and God's Graces"	Taylor Swift; Liz Rose; Brian Maher	Registered by the ASCAP	
"Tell Me"	Taylor Swift; Liz Rose	Registered by the ASCAP	
"Tennessee"	Unknown	Included on one of Swift's demo CDs from 2003	
"That's Life"	Unknown	Included on one of Swift's demo CDs from 2003	
"Thinking 'Bout You"	Taylor Swift; Liz Rose	Registered by the ASCAP	
"Thirteen Blocks"	Taylor Swift; Scooter Carusoe	Registered by the ASCAP	
"This Here Guitar"	Taylor Swift	Registered by the ASCAP; Included on one of Swift's demo CDs from 2003	
"This Is Really Happening"	Taylor Swift; Blu Sanders	Registered by the ASCAP	
"This One's Different"	Taylor Swift; Matthew Jenkins	Registered by the ASCAP	
"Today"	Unknown	Included on one of Swift's demo CDs from 2004	
"Too Beautiful"	Taylor Swift	Registered by the ASCAP	
"Under My Head"	Taylor Swift	Registered by the ASCAP	
"Wait for Me"	Taylor Swift	Registered by the ASCAP; Recorded before the release of Swift's debut studio album Taylor Swift (2006)	
"Welcome Distraction"	Taylor Swift; Brad Warren; Brett Warren	Registered by the ASCAP; Recorded before the release of Swift's debut studio album Taylor Swift (2006)	
"What Do You Say?"	Unknown	Included on Swift's demo CD from January 15, 2004	
"What to Wear"	Unknown	Recorded before the release of Swift's debut studio album Taylor Swift (2006); Included on one of Swift's demo CDs from 2004	
"Who I've Always Been"	Taylor Swift; Liz Rose; Brian Maher	Registered by the ASCAP; Recorded before the release of Swift's debut studio album Taylor Swift (2006)	
"Wonderful Things"	Taylor Swift	Registered by the ASCAP	
"You"	Unknown	Included on one of Swift's demo CDs from 2004	
"You Do"	Taylor Swift; Liz Rose	Registered by the ASCAP	
"You Don't Have to Call"	Taylor Swift	Registered by the ASCAP	
"You Walk Away"	Unknown	Included on one of Swift's demo CDs from 2003	
"Your Picture"	Unknown	Included on two of Swift's demo CDs from 2003 and 2004	

== Other songs ==
Name of song, writers, and any other notes
Song	Writer(s)	Notes	Ref.
"Thug Story"	Taylor Swift	Swift performed this song with T-Pain for the CMT Music Awards in June 2009. This song is a parody of Swift's 2008 single "Love Story".	
"Monologue Song (La La La)"	Taylor Swift	Swift wrote a song to act as her monologue when she appeared as a host on Saturday Night Live in 2009.	
"Three Sad Virgins"	Taylor Swift; Pete Davidson; Dan Bulla; Martin Herlihy; John Higgins; Ben Marshall; Jake Procanik	Swift performed a parody rap song with Pete Davidson and Please Don't Destroy on Saturday Night Live in 2021.	
