= If This Was a Movie =

2010 song by Taylor Swift

Promotional single by Taylor Swift

from the album Speak Now (Deluxe Edition)
- Released: November 8, 2011
- Genre: Pop rock
- Length: 3:54
- Label: Big Machine
- Songwriters: Taylor Swift; Martin Johnson
- Producers: Taylor Swift; Nathan Chapman

Audio video
- "If This Was a Movie" on YouTube

"If This Was a Movie" is a song by the American singer-songwriter Taylor Swift from the deluxe edition of her third studio album, Speak Now (2010). She wrote the track with Martin Johnson and produced it with Nathan Chapman. A pop rock song, "If This Was a Movie" includes both acoustic and electric string instruments, drums, key notes, and full orchestration. The lyrics depict a lost love where Swift's character begs an ex-lover to return to her and expects him to do so like it was a movie.

Initially released as part of the album's physical deluxe edition, "If This Was a Movie" became available digitally when Big Machine Records issued it through the iTunes Store on November 8, 2011. Upon this release, the song reached charts in Canada, the United Kingdom, and the United States, where it debuted within the top ten of the Billboard Hot 100. Two publication reviews of the track were published in late 2011; one found it engaging, and the other deemed that it showcased newfound maturity within Swift's lyrics. Retrospective rankings of Swift's songs have included the track within the lower-tier positions.

On March 17, 2023, Swift released a re-recording of the song, titled "If This Was a Movie (Taylor's Version)", alongside other songs to streaming services to celebrate the start of her Eras Tour, where she debuted it live on piano during a Minneapolis show on June 23. Produced by Swift and Christopher Rowe, the re-recording was also part of an effort to re-record her early catalog after a dispute over the ownership of the master recordings.

== Background and release ==
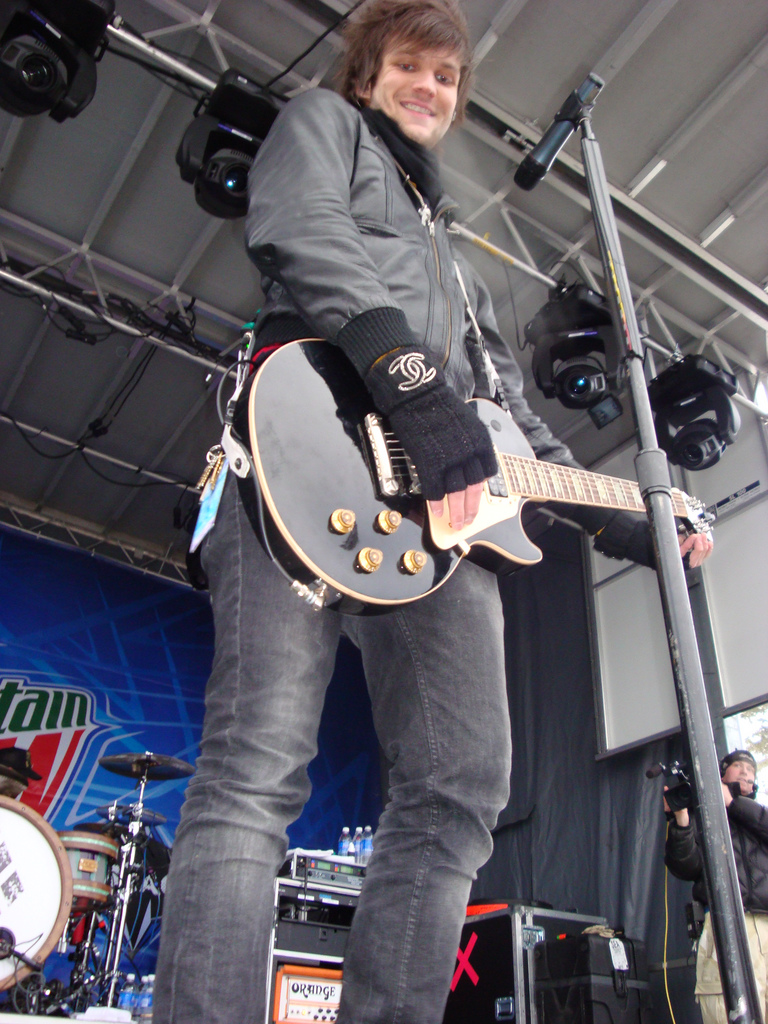
Martin Johnson co-wrote "If This Was a Movie".

Taylor Swift conceived her third studio album, Speak Now (2010), as a collection of tracks about the things she had wanted to say but was unable to do with the people she had met. There were as many as 40 songs Swift wrote for the album, which she co-produced with Nathan Chapman, who had worked on her previous releases. By around mid-2010, she had secured the final track list, where all the tracks were written by her. One exception, however, was "If This Was a Movie", which Swift wrote with Martin Johnson alongside other songs.

"If This Was a Movie" was included as a bonus track in Speak Now's deluxe edition, which was released as a Target-exclusive alongside the standard edition on October 25, 2010. Big Machine Records made the song digitally available, along with the other bonus tracks, through the iTunes Store on November 8, 2011. On June 23, 2023, Swift debuted the track live on piano during a show in Minneapolis, as part of her Eras Tour (2023–2024).

After its digital release, "If This Was a Movie" debuted at number ten on the Billboard Hot 100 chart in the United States, where the track also reached number three on Digital Songs with 163,000 downloads. The top-ten entry on the Hot 100 made the song become the fourth track from Speak Now to do so, in addition to extending Swift's record of most top-ten debuts for any act with ten. It peaked atop on Country Digital Song Sales as well. Elsewhere, the song reached number 191 in the United Kingdom and number 17 in Canada, where it also peaked at number 10 on Canada Digital Song Sales.

== Music and lyrics ==
"If This Was a Movie"
A sample of the song's first verse and chorus: Swift sings the verse's melody built on short motive figures at a low register, while in the chorus she sings the more melodious melody at a higher register.

A pop rock song produced by Swift and Chapman, "If This Was a Movie" was described by critics as "epic", "somber", and "sparkling". Lexi Lane of Uproxx said that the track was a ballad, while Damien Somville and Marine Benoit contended that it was a power ballad. According to the Seattle Weekly's Erin Thompson, the song has a basic arrangement and structure, which he regarded as "Swiftian". The musicologist James E. Perone commented that the arrangement had "unusual instrumental colors" that could give "mixed-genre messages" to listeners.

With a length of 3 minutes and 54 seconds, "If This Was a Movie" features a tempo of 72 beats per minute and being led by the eighth notes. Containing acoustic string instruments from country and folk music, the song has a rhythmic, strumming mandolin and acoustic guitar playing arpeggios. Ostinato arpeggios from an twelve-string guitar are featured on its introduction and verses, where the verse melody is performed at a low register and built on short motive figures. The dramatic chorus, where Swift sings with a twang accompanied by harmonies, contrasts the verses by being more melodious and performed at a higher register. The track also includes ultra-compressed bass drums, successive layers of electric guitars, key notes, and full orchestration with emphasized string arrangements.

The lyrics of "If This Was a Movie" are about a lost love, wherein Swift's character pleads an ex-lover, who had left for six months, to come back to her, expecting him to do as such like it was a movie. She imagines that through this perspective, he would be sorry to her for what mistake he made, and she would accept his apology and reconcile with him. A staff from Billboard said that she was in a state of coming of age in the lyrics, believing that she departs from the "fantasy world of high school" and examines "more mature content". Swift on the song often recalls the important memories when they were together. It also includes a lyric about being in the rain ("Stand in the rain/'Til I came out"), which Thompson felt was used extensively in her songs. (Note: Thompson highlighted lyrics with the same imagery from "Hey Stephen", "Fearless", "Forever & Always", and "Sparks Fly" to support his claim.) By the conclusion, the ideal ending does not happen like Swift had hoped for.

== Critical reception ==
In late 2011, two publication reviews of "If This Was a Movie" were issued. Thompson included it in the Seattle Weekly's "Nice Hits!"—a column that explores the best tracks out of the top 40 songs in a given time. He believed that while not "lyrically perfect", the track had the features that made Swift's songs engaging, including for what he considered vulnerable, relatable songwriting and a simple composition. Billboard's staff stated that it showcased "a more age-appropriate track" from her.

Over the years, retrospective rankings of Swift's songs have included "If This Was a Movie" within the lower-tier positions. Paste's ranking, published in February 2020, listed the track as 115th among her 158 songs—one of its writers Jane Song took issue with the line, "Come back to me like", which she heard as "Come back to me, daylight". In her September 2020 ranking of Swift's 161 tracks for NME, Hannah Mylrea placed the song at 150th, writing that "it stutters towards the finish line" and that it was "frustratingly repetitive" overall. Rob Sheffield listed the track as 266th in his October 2025 ranking of her 286 songs for Rolling Stone. The next month, Nate Jones of Vulture updated his ranking of Swift's 245 tracks, where the song was placed at 170th; he viewed it as "the mirror image" of her track "White Horse" (2008) that, to him, made it "oddly superfluous". The Ringer's Nora Princiotti had a similar opinion in her October 2026 ranking of Swift's 270 tracks where she placed the song at 217—she said that "White Horse" as well as "How You Get the Girl" (2014) had the same lyrical theme that for her was comparatively more well-written on those tracks.

Other reviews had positive comments for the song. In an initial review of Speak Now, Sam Gnerre of the Los Angeles Daily News wrote that the bonus tracks—including "If This Was a Movie"—were good enough to be within the standard album. Benoit and Somville wrote that it was a "five-tiered musical showpiece" and that the composition made the "perfect theme song for a Hollywood-styled sentimental drama". In a 2023 ranking of all 17 original tracks from Speak Now's deluxe edition where the song placed sixteenth, Taste of Country's Carena Liptak said that it, while not among the album's most memorable, displayed "Swift's heartbreak songwriting at its wistful, earworm-y best" and that its emotional impact was skillfully handled. She attributed the placement to how other tracks better showcase Swift's "ability to wax poetic on heartbreak and nostalgia".

== Charts ==
Chart performance
Chart (2011)	Peak position
Canada Digital Song Sales (Billboard)	10
Canada Hot 100 (Billboard)	17
UK Singles (OCC)	191
US Billboard Hot 100	10
US Digital Song Sales (Billboard)	3
US Country Digital Song Sales (Billboard)	1

== "If This Was a Movie (Taylor's Version)" ==
"If This Was a Movie (Taylor's Version)"

Promotional single by Taylor Swift

from the EP The More Fearless (Taylor's Version) Chapter
- Released: March 17, 2023
- Length: 3:57
- Composers: Taylor Swift; Martin Johnson
- Lyricists: Taylor Swift; Martin Johnson
- Producers: Taylor Swift; Christopher Rowe

Audio video
- "If This Was a Movie (Taylor's Version)" on YouTube

=== Release and production ===
To celebrate the start of the Eras Tour on March 17, 2023, Swift released a re-recording of the song, titled "If This Was a Movie" (Taylor's Version)", on that day alongside three other songs to streaming services. The re-recording was also part of an attempt to re-record her early catalog after a dispute over the ownership of the master recordings. It has the same cover art as that of Swift's re-recorded album, Fearless (Taylor's Version) (2021), and was included on the compilation, The More Fearless (Taylor's Version) Chapter, which was also released on that day. Speculation ensued amongst fans regarding the song's release, according to some journalists, who questioned whether it would be featured on Speak Now's re-recording, Speak Now (Taylor's Version) (2023). (Note: Speak Now (Taylor's Version) was not yet announced at the time, until May 5, 2023.) When the album's track list was unveiled on June 5, 2023, the song was not on it.

"If This Was a Movie (Taylor's Version)" has a length of 3 minutes and 57 seconds. The Times's Will Hodgkinson described it as "straightforward, innocent, slightly breathy balladry with an orchestral backing". The song was produced by Swift and its vocal engineer Christopher Rowe. Musicians on the track were Amos Heller (who played bass), David Cook (piano), Matt Billingslea (drums and percussion), Max Bernstein (electric guitar), Mike Meadows (acoustic guitar), and Paul Sidoti (electric guitar); Bernstein also provided synthesizer programming, while Meadows was the background vocalist. The engineers were Bryce Bordone and Derek Garten, who was also the editor alongside Lowell Reynolds. David Payne was the recording engineer, assisted by Reynolds. The mixer was Serban Ghenea, while the mastering engineer was Randy Merrill.

=== Critical reception and chart performance ===
In two reviews of the four songs that were released right before the start of Swift's Eras Tour, "If This Was a Movie" (Taylor's Version)" received favorable comments. Writing for The Freeman, Januar Junior Aguja said that the track could have new fans because of Swift's vocals on the re-recording, claiming that they had improved. Hodgkinson wrote that the song was "corny but smart" and, to him, had Swift's early brilliance of "capturing an entire romantic drama in three minutes", considering that it had both an "ingenue spirit" and professionally-written ruthlessness.

Commercially, "If This Was a Movie (Taylor's Version)" reached number two on the Bubbling Under Hot 100 and number four on Digital Songs in the US with 11,300 downloads. On Country Digital Song Sales, it became her record-extending 19th number-one entry and made "If This Was a Movie" the first song to have two versions peak atop the chart. On sales-component charts in other countries, the song reached number seven on Canada Digital Song Sales and number thirteen on both UK Singles Downloads and UK Singles Sales. It also entered at number twelve on Hot 40 Singles in New Zealand.

=== Personnel ===
Adapted from Tidal

- Taylor Swift – vocals, composer, lyricist, producer
- Martin Johnson – composer, lyricist
- Christopher Rowe – producer, vocal engineer
- Amos Heller – bass
- David Cook – piano
- Matt Billingslea – drums, percussion
- Max Bernstein – electric guitar, synthesizer programming
- Mike Meadows – acoustic guitar, mandolin, background vocalist
- Paul Sidoti – electric guitar
- Bryce Bordone – engineer
- David Payne – recording engineer
- Derek Garten – editor, engineer
- Lowell Reynolds – assistant recording engineer, editor
- Randy Merrill – mastering engineer
- Serban Ghenea – mixer

=== Charts ===
Chart performance for Taylor's version
Chart (2023)	Peak position
Canada Digital Song Sales (Billboard)	7
New Zealand Hot Singles (RMNZ)	12
UK Singles Downloads (Official Charts)	13
UK Singles Sales (OCC)	13
US Bubbling Under Hot 100 (Billboard)	2
US Digital Song Sales (Billboard)	4
US Country Digital Song Sales (Billboard)	1
