= False God (song) =

2019 song by Taylor Swift

Song by Taylor Swift

from the album Lover
- Released: August 23, 2019
- Studio: Electric Lady (New York City)
- Genre: R&B; neo soul; smooth jazz; sophisti-pop
- Length: 3:20
- Label: Republic
- Songwriters: Taylor Swift; Jack Antonoff
- Producers: Taylor Swift; Jack Antonoff

Audio video
- "False God" on YouTube

"False God" is a song by the American singer-songwriter Taylor Swift from her seventh studio album, Lover (2019). Written and produced by Swift and Jack Antonoff, the song is an atmospheric slow jam combining R&B, neo soul, smooth jazz, sophisti-pop, and influences of jazz; it consists of a saxophone riff, trap beats, and hiccuping vocal samples. The lyrics use religious imagery to depict hardships and intimacy in a long-distance romantic relationship, mentioning New York City and its neighborhood West Village.

Music critics highlighted the sexually provocative lyrics and the sultry production. Some regarded "False God" as an album highlight, but a few otherwise found it unremarkable. Commercially, the song peaked at number 59 on the ARIA Singles Chart and number 77 on both the US Billboard Hot 100 and Canadian Hot 100. It received certifications in Australia, Brazil, New Zealand, and the United Kingdom.

Swift performed the song on a 2019 episode of Saturday Night Live, assisted by the show's musical director Lenny Pickett on saxophone. She sang it live four times on the Eras Tour (2023–2024). The song has been covered by the English singer-songwriter James Bay and the American country singer Ryan Hurd.

== Background and release ==
Taylor Swift conceived her seventh studio album, Lover, as a "love letter to love" itself that explores the many feelings evoked by love. The album was influenced by the connections she felt with her fans on her Reputation Stadium Tour (2018), which helped her recalibrate her personal life and artistic direction. Republic Records released Lover on August 23, 2019. It was Swift's first album under Republic after she ended her previous contract with Big Machine. Lover consists of 18 tracks, and "False God" is track number 13. Prior to the release, Swift included parts of the lyrics in an advertisement on The New York Times. "False God" entered at number 77 on both the charts of the Canadian Hot 100 and the US Billboard Hot 100. In Australia, it peaked at number 59 on the ARIA Singles Chart and received a platinum certification from the Australian Recording Industry Association.

== Production and music ==
"False God"
"False God" begins with a saxophone riff and proceeds with an atmospheric production consisting of trap beats and hiccupping vocal samples.

"False God" is 3 minutes and 20 seconds long. Swift wrote and produced the track with Jack Antonoff, who programmed the instruments and played the keyboards. Antonoff and Laura Sisk recorded the song at Electric Lady Studios in New York City (NYC), and both of them provided backing vocals with Brandon Bost, Mikey Freedom Hart, Cassidy Laden, and Ken Lewis. Michael Riddleberger played live drums, and John Hanes engineered the track. Serban Ghenea mixed "False God" at MixStar Studios, Virginia Beach, Virginia, and Randy Merrill mastered it at Sterling Sound in NYC.

"False God" begins with a saxophone riff (played by Evan Smith) that recurs throughout the track. The jazz-influenced song progresses into an atmospheric, slow-building track consisting of trap beats and hiccuping vocal samples, over which Swift sings with her breathy vocals. Music critics described the genre as neo soul, smooth jazz, and sophisti-pop. Some critics described it as a nod to 1980s R&B, while Jason Lipshutz of Billboard considered the song "faux-R&B". Lindsay Zoladz from The Ringer described the sound as "sultry", and NME's Nick Levine opined that the song was a "balmy mix of sax and trap". Lipshutz and The Washington Post's Emily Yahr regarded it as a slow jam. In Vanity Fair, Erin Vanderhoff identified "fun tropes" of 1990s dance music shown through the combination of saxophone and "an electronic skitter".

There were comparisons to the music of other artists. According to Slant Magazine's Sal Cinquemani, "False God" evokes the 1980s R&B-influenced electropop sound of the Canadian singer and songwriter Carly Rae Jepsen. For Annie Zaleski of The A.V. Club, "False God" was reminiscent of the music by the English musician James Blake. Esquire's Dave Holmes compared the sound to the compilation album Pure Moods (1994). Meanwhile, Larry Fitzmaurice from Entertainment Weekly deemed the song a take on the lovers rock sound popularized by the English singer Sade. Writing for the same publication, Marcus Jones wrote that Swift's vocal cadence and the saxophone backing evoked the American singer Bruce Springsteen.

== Lyrical content and analysis ==
"False God" is about how false promises can help overcome the challenges of a long-distance relationship ("We were stupid to jump in the ocean separating us/ Remember how I'd fly to you?"). The song extensively uses religious imagery, mentioning false god, altar, sacramental wine, heaven, and hell. Some reviewers thought that the lyrics alluded to oral sex ("Religion's in your lips/ [...] The altar is my hips").

The narrator talks about physical pleasure using heavenly imagery: "I know heaven's a thing, I go there when you touch me, honey." The couple encounters challenges ("Hell is when I fight with you") and tries to make amends, but puts up with uneasy silence ("And you can't talk to me when I'm like this/ Daring you to leave me just so I can try and scare you/ You're the West Village/ You still do it for me, babe"). Religious imagery continue in the lyrics, "Making confessions and we're begging for forgiveness/ Got the wine for you." In the chorus, the narrator talks about how "religion's in your lips" and "the altar is my hips", ultimately accepting the false hopes, "We might just get away with it/ [...] Even if it's a false god." The line "We'd still worship this love" is repeated multiple times.

For some critics, the mentions of NYC and its neighborhood West Village illustrate the long-distance romantic relationship. Raisa Bruner of Time and Anna Gaca of Pitchfork thought that the romance in question was a "transatlantic" one. Mary Elizabeth Andriotis from Teen Vogue said the heavenly imagery connected "False God" to the fellow album track "Cruel Summer", and "Blank Space" and "Wildest Dreams", both from Swift's album 1989 (2014). In Business Insider, Callie Ahlgrim commented that the religious overtones of "False God" were a throwback to Swift's early-career songs such as "Our Song" (2006), "Christmas Must Be Something More" (2007), and "Come In with the Rain" (2008). Whereas those songs saw Swift praying to God and keeping faith, "False God" hinted at guilt and shame, which Ahlgrim found relatable to a queer audience.

== Critical reception ==
Many critics praised Swift's songwriting on "False God" and deemed it the most sexually explicit track on Lover. Jeff Nelson from People called the song a "steamy standout" while Bruner deemed it "[Swift's] most sensual take yet". Courtney Smith of Refinery29 found Swift's songwriting on "False God" to have confidence that evoked the styles of the musician Prince. Holmes said that the resemblance to Prince was in the ambiguous lyrics about either religion or sex, and he commented that Swift was "somebody [who] has to step up with one of those". Mikael Wood of the Los Angeles Times thought that "False God" featured Swift's newfound "emotional wisdom" earned through her experience. He ranked the song seventh out of 18 Lover tracks, saying that it "blends sex and religion with a breathy assurance [Swift's] never mustered before". Miranda Wollen from Paste dubbed "False God" one of Swift's catchiest songs and a "celebration of womanhood, sensuality and intelligence".

Others praised the production. Gaca lauded the track as "terrific", and Alexis Petridis of The Guardian complimented the production as "beautiful and strangely subdued". Zaleski lauded the sound because she thought it showcased one of the "best, most effortless" tunes produced by Swift and Antonoff. Lydia Burgham of The New Zealand Herald picked "False God" as an album highlight and said its "sensual" soundscape signaled a maturity in Swift's music. Lipshutz ranked the song third among the 18 album tracks and wrote: "keep this on repeat, because it'll go down smooth every time." In a list ranking Swift's select 100 songs for The Independent, Roison O'Connor placed "False God" at number 21; she complimented the saxophone, beats, and Swift's "low murmurs" that were "so full of longing, you feel a bit awkward eavesdropping on such an intimate moment". A few critics regarded "False God" as an influence on the musical stylings of Swift's later albums, Folklore (2020) and Midnights (2022).

On a less enthusiastic side, Jane Song from Paste thought that some lyrics were clunky and the NYC references ineffective, but complimented the saxophone that "makes it all better". Fitzmaurice applauded "False God" for showcasing a somewhat experimental production, but said it made the album "[sag] a bit". Writing for PopMatters, Deborah Krieger remarked that the track was a boring one, criticizing the "saxophone-y flourishes" as "about a half-step below 'Careless Whisper' in terms of pure cheese". MusicOMH's John Murphy opined that the track's placement within the album made it mentally draining to listen to.

== Live performances and covers ==
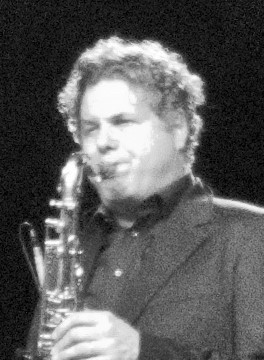
Swift performed "False God" on Saturday Night Live, accompanied by its musical director Lenny Pickett (pictured) on saxophone.

On October 5, 2019, Swift appeared on Saturday Night Live (SNL) as part of the 45th season as a musical guest. She performed "False God" live on a stage decorated with lightbulbs against pitch-black walls as smoke covered the ground. She was accompanied by background singers, a drummer, a keyboardist, and SNL's musical director Lenny Pickett on saxophone. Swift wore an oversized black-colored blazer and sequined pants; De Elizabeth from Teen Vogue likened this outfit to the aesthetic of her 2017 album Reputation.

Media publications generally praised this rendition of "False God", labeling it as "loungy" and "vibey", and highlighting Swift's live vocals. Pickett's appearance was also applauded for his saxophone performance, with Matthew Dessem of Slate opining that his performance "has got to be the smoothest saxophone sound an SNL musical guest has had in years". In NPR, Stephen Thompson ranked Swift's performance eighth out of 18 musical guests of the 45th SNL season; he described "False God" as a "[less] emotionally rich but more visually eventful" number compared to "Lover".

On the Eras Tour, Swift contained a segment of "surprise songs" when she performed random songs from her discography—one on guitar and another on piano. Each night, she changed tracks to perform, which she picked based on show's location. During the stop in East Rutherford on May 27, she sang "False God" on piano. The New Yorker's Amanda Petrusich opined that the "False God" piano rendition showcased how Swift's voice improved over the years and turned it into a reflective number. Ranking all the "surprise song" sets that Swift performed on the 53 U.S. dates, Nora Princiotti of The Ringer ranked it the 28th best. In 2024, she performed a piano mashup of "False God" with "'Slut!'" during the March 8 concert in Singapore and the July 17 concert in Gelsenkirchen, and a piano mashup with "'Tis the Damn Season" during the November 14 concert in Toronto.

"False God" was covered by two musicians, which both received acknowledgements from Swift. The English singer-songwriter James Bay shared a 45-second-long clip of him singing the song's chorus in falsetto and on guitar in September 2019, which Gil Kaufman of Billboard dubbed as "gorgeous". The American country singer and songwriter Ryan Hurd performed his rendition of "False God" on his 2020 Platonic Tour, replacing the saxophone with drums and echoing guitars; Swift retweeted his performance afterwards.

== Personnel ==
Credits are adapted from the liner notes of Lover.

- Taylor Swift – vocals, songwriting, production
- Jack Antonoff – songwriting, production, recording, programming, keyboards, backing vocals
- Michael Riddleberger – live drums
- Evan Smith – saxophones
- Laura Sisk – recording, backing vocals
- Brandon Bost – backing vocals
- Mikey Freedom Hart – backing vocals
- Cassidy Laden – backing vocals
- Ken Lewis – backing vocals
- John Hanes – engineering
- Serban Ghenea – mixing
- Randy Merrill – mastering

== Charts ==
Weekly chart performance for "False God"
| Chart (2019) | Peak position |
|---|---|
| Australia (ARIA) | 59 |
| Canada Hot 100 (Billboard) | 77 |
| US Billboard Hot 100 | 77 |

== Certifications ==
Certifications for "False God"
| Region | Certification | Certified units/sales |
|---|---|---|
| Australia (ARIA) | Platinum | 70,000^{‡} |
| Brazil (Pro-Música Brasil) | Gold | 20,000^{‡} |
| New Zealand (RMNZ) | Gold | 15,000^{‡} |
| United Kingdom (BPI) | Silver | 200,000^{‡} |
^{‡} Sales+streaming figures based on certification alone.
