= Taylor Swift albums discography =

Albums by American singer-songwriter

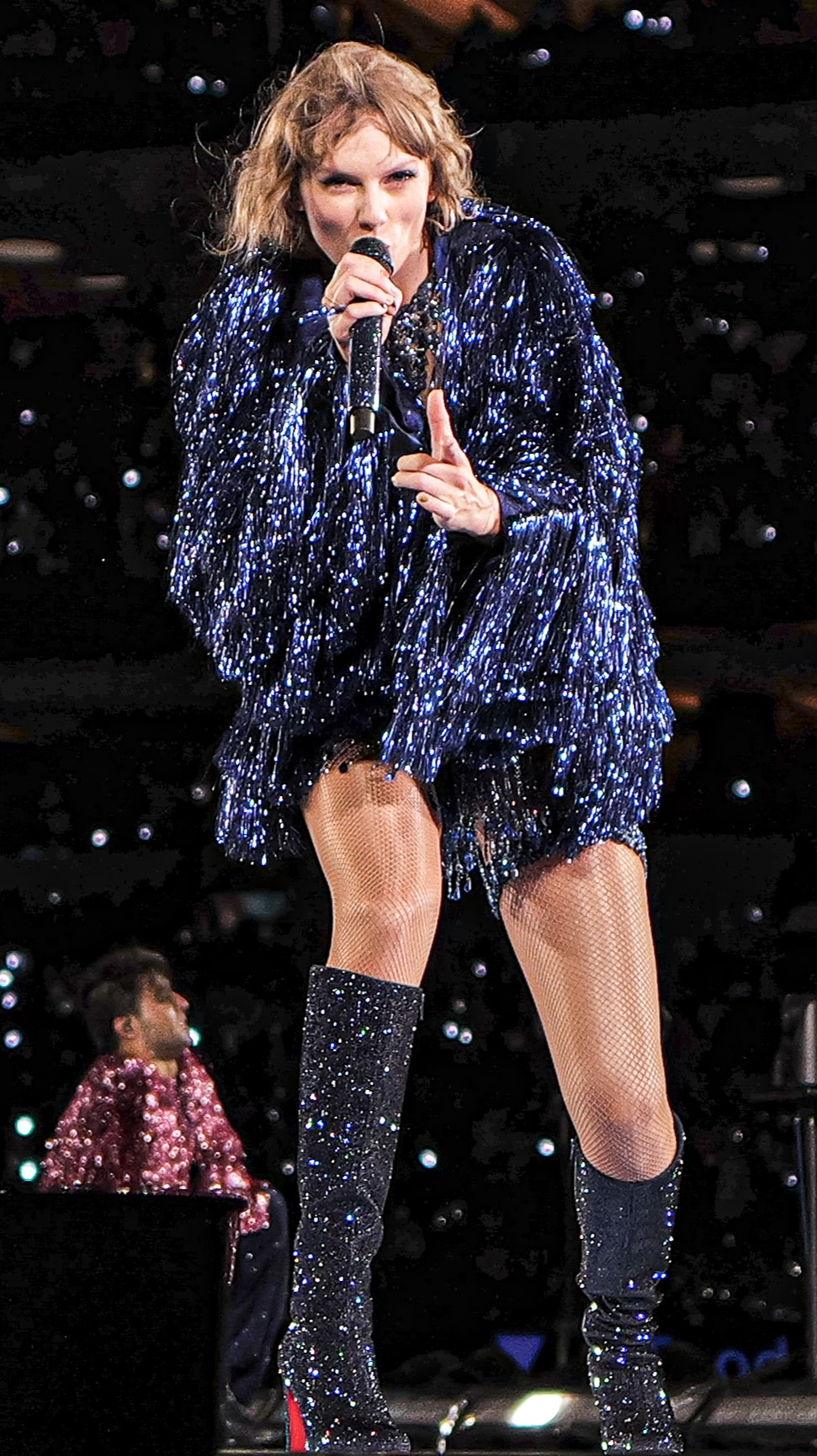
- Swift performing on the Eras Tour in 2023
- Studio albums: 12
- Re-recorded albums: 4
- EPs: 6
- Live albums: 4
- Compilation albums: 20
- Box sets: 1

The American singer-songwriter Taylor Swift has released 12 studio albums, 4 re-recorded albums, 6 extended plays (EPs), 4 live albums, 20 compilation albums, and 1 box set. In the United States, as of May 2025, she had sold 116.7 million album-equivalent units, coming from 54 million pure sales and 70.7 billion streams; the Recording Industry Association of America (RIAA) as of November 2025 certified 110 million album units, making her the highest-certified female album artist. On the Billboard 200 chart, she has accumulated 15 albums and 101 total weeks at number one, more than any other solo act.

Swift released six albums with Big Machine Records. Her debut album, Taylor Swift (2006), spent more weeks on the Billboard 200 than any other album in the 2000s decade, and her second, Fearless (2008), was the only album from the 2000s decade to spend one year in the top 10 of the Billboard 200. Fearless was Swift's first album to top the charts in Canada and New Zealand. Her next albums—Speak Now (2010), Red (2012), 1989 (2014), and Reputation (2017)—all reached number one on the Billboard 200, and each sold over one million US first-week copies. All four albums also reached number one in Australia, Canada, and New Zealand, and the latter three reached number one in the United Kingdom.

Under a recording contract with Republic Records signed in 2018, Swift has released six original albums—Lover (2019), Folklore (2020), Evermore (2020), Midnights (2022), The Tortured Poets Department (2024), and The Life of a Showgirl (2025)—all of which topped the Billboard 200. Lover was Swift's first number-one album in Spain and Sweden. Midnights, The Tortured Poets Department, and The Life of a Showgirl reached number one in Australia, Canada, Denmark, Ireland, New Zealand, Norway, Spain, and the United Kingdom. In the United States, Midnights sold over one million units in its first week, while The Tortured Poets Department opened with two million units and The Life of a Showgirl with four million units; the latter became the fastest-selling album in modern American history.

Swift's departure from Big Machine resulted in a dispute over the ownership of her first six albums in 2019, which resulted in her re-recording four albums—Fearless (Taylor's Version) (2021), Red (Taylor's Version) (2021), Speak Now (Taylor's Version) (2023), and 1989 (Taylor's Version) (2023)—all of which reached number one in Australia, Canada, Ireland, New Zealand, the United Kingdom, and the United States. Fearless (Taylor's Version) was the first re-recorded album to top the Billboard 200, and 1989 (Taylor's Version) sold over a million US first-week copies. Swift holds the record for the most annual best-selling albums in the United States—nine times: Fearless in 2009, 1989 in 2014, Reputation in 2017, Lover in 2019, Folklore in 2020, Midnights in 2022, 1989 (Taylor's Version) in 2023, The Tortured Poets Department in 2024, and The Life of a Showgirl in 2025.

== Studio albums ==
List of studio albums, with selected chart positions, sales figures and certifications
Title	Details	Peak chart positions										Sales (Note: Pure sales and not equivalent units (streaming and song downloads))	Certifications
Title	Details	US	AUS	CAN	DEN	IRE	NZ	NOR	SPA	SWE	UK	Sales	Certifications
Taylor Swift	Released: October 24, 2006; Label: Big Machine; Formats: CD, DVD, LP, digital download, streaming	5	33	14	—	59	38	—	—	—	81	US: 5,871,000 (Note: US album sales as of January 2024); UK: 251,320 (Note: UK album sales as of April 2024)	RIAA: 8× Platinum; ARIA: 2× Platinum; BPI: Platinum; MC: 5× Platinum; RMNZ: Platinum
Fearless	Released: November 11, 2008; Label: Big Machine; Formats: CD, DVD, LP, digital download, streaming	1	2	1	23	7	1	5	28	12	5	US: 7,286,000 (Note: US album sales as of January 2024); AUS: 500,000 (Note: Australian sales for Fearless as of December 2017); UK: 718,518	RIAA: 11× Platinum (Diamond); ARIA: 8× Platinum; BPI: 2× Platinum; IFPI DEN: Platinum; IFPI NOR: Gold; IRMA: 2× Platinum; MC: 4× Platinum; RMNZ: 6× Platinum
Speak Now	Released: October 25, 2010; Label: Big Machine; Formats: CD, DVD, LP, digital download, streaming	1	1	1	26	6	1	4	10	18	6	US: 4,817,000; UK: 416,676	RIAA: 6× Platinum; ARIA: 3× Platinum; BPI: Platinum; IFPI NOR: Gold; IRMA: Gold; MC: 3× Platinum; RMNZ: 3× Platinum
Red	Released: October 22, 2012; Label: Big Machine; Formats: CD, DVD, LP, digital download, streaming	1	1	1	3	1	1	2	4	8	1	US: 4,582,000; UK: 874,532	RIAA: 8× Platinum; ARIA: 5× Platinum; BPI: 3× Platinum; GLF: Gold; IFPI DEN: Platinum; IRMA: Platinum; MC: 4× Platinum; RMNZ: 6× Platinum
1989	Released: October 27, 2014; Label: Big Machine; Formats: CD, DVD, LP, digital download, streaming	1	1	1	2	1	1	1	4	17	1	US: 6,472,000; CAN: 542,000 (Note: Canadian sales for albums as of January 2020); UK: 1,792,380	RIAA: 14× Platinum (Diamond); ARIA: 11× Platinum; BPI: 6× Platinum; GLF: Gold; IFPI DEN: 3× Platinum; IFPI NOR: 3× Platinum; MC: 6× Platinum; PROMUSICAE: Gold; RMNZ: 11× Platinum
Reputation	Released: November 10, 2017; Label: Big Machine; Formats: CD, DVD, LP, digital download, cassette, streaming	1	1	1	3	1	1	1	3	2	1	US: 2,478,000; UK: 823,579	RIAA: 7× Platinum; ARIA: 6× Platinum; BPI: 3× Platinum; GLF: Platinum; IFPI DEN: 2× Platinum; IFPI NOR: Gold; MC: 8× Platinum; PROMUSICAE: Gold; RMNZ: 6× Platinum
Lover	Released: August 23, 2019; Label: Republic; Formats: CD, LP, digital download, cassette, streaming	1	1	1	3	1	1	1	1	1	1	US: 2,317,000; CAN: 61,000; UK: 726,521	RIAA: 7× Platinum; ARIA: 4× Platinum; BPI: 3× Platinum; IFPI DEN: 3× Platinum; IFPI NOR: Platinum; MC: 9× Platinum; PROMUSICAE: Gold; RMNZ: 7× Platinum
Folklore	Released: July 24, 2020; Label: Republic; Formats: CD, LP, digital download, cassette, streaming	1	1	1	1	1	1	1	2	3	1	US: 2,289,000; CAN: 62,000 (Note: Canadian sales for Folklore as of January 2021); UK: 692,553	RIAA: 6× Platinum; ARIA: 3× Platinum; BPI: 3× Platinum; IFPI DEN: 3× Platinum; IFPI NOR: Platinum; MC: 7× Platinum; PROMUSICAE: Gold; RMNZ: 5× Platinum
Evermore	Released: December 11, 2020; Label: Republic; Formats: CD, LP, digital download, cassette, streaming	1	1	1	2	2	1	3	11	3	1	US: 913,000 (Note: US album sales as of October 2022); CAN: 31,000 (Note: Canadian sales for Evermore in 2020 (digital only) and 2021 (overall)); UK: 421,769	RIAA: 4× Platinum; ARIA: 2× Platinum; BPI: 2× Platinum; IFPI DEN: 2× Platinum; IFPI NOR: Gold; MC: 4× Platinum; PROMUSICAE: Gold; RMNZ: 3× Platinum
Midnights	Released: October 21, 2022; Label: Republic; Formats: CD, LP, digital download, cassette, streaming	1	1	1	1	1	1	1	1	1	1	US: 2,814,000; UK: 830,787	RIAA: 7× Platinum; ARIA: 3× Platinum; BPI: 3× Platinum; IFPI DEN: 3× Platinum; IFPI NOR: Gold; MC: 8× Platinum; PROMUSICAE: 2× Platinum; RMNZ: 6× Platinum
The Tortured Poets Department	Released: April 19, 2024; Label: Republic; Formats: CD, LP, digital download, cassette, streaming	1	1	1	1	1	1	1	1	1	1	US: 3,491,000 (Note: US sales for The Tortured Poets Department as of January 2025); CAN: 108,000 (Note: Canadian sales for The Tortured Poets Department as of July 2024); UK: 313,800 (Note: UK physical sales for The Tortured Poets Department as of December 2024)	RIAA: 8× Platinum; ARIA: 3× Platinum; BPI: 3× Platinum; IFPI DEN: 3× Platinum; MC: 7× Platinum; PROMUSICAE: 2× Platinum; RMNZ: 5× Platinum
The Life of a Showgirl	Released: October 3, 2025; Label: Republic; Formats: CD, LP, digital download, cassette, streaming	1	1	1	1	1	1	1	1	1	1	US: 3,985,000 (Note: US sales for The Life of a Showgirl as of January 2026); UK: 815,618 (Note: UK album sales for The Life of a Showgirl as of October 2026)	RIAA: 5× Platinum; ARIA: 2× Platinum; BPI: 2× Platinum; IFPI DEN: 2× Platinum; MC: 4× Platinum; PROMUSICAE: 2× Platinum; RMNZ: 3× Platinum
"—" denotes a recording that did not chart in that territory.

== Re-recorded albums ==
List of re-recorded albums, with selected chart positions, sales figures and certifications
Title	Details	Peak chart positions										Sales	Certifications
Title	Details	US	AUS	CAN	DEN	IRE	NZ	NOR	SPA	SWE	UK	Sales	Certifications
Fearless (Taylor's Version)	Released: April 9, 2021; Label: Republic; Formats: CD, LP, digital download, cassette, streaming	1	1	1	8	1	1	2	3	17	1	US: 737,000 (Note: US album sales as of July 2023); CAN: 18,000 (Note: Canadian sales for albums as of January 2022); UK: 217,947	RIAA: 4× Platinum; ARIA: Platinum; BPI: Platinum; IFPI DEN: Gold; MC: 3× Platinum; PROMUSICAE: Gold; RMNZ: 2× Platinum
Red (Taylor's Version)	Released: November 12, 2021; Label: Republic; Formats: CD, LP, digital download, streaming	1	1	1	3	1	1	1	3	8	1	US: 950,000; CAN: 24,000; UK: 357,565	RIAA: 6× Platinum; ARIA: 2× Platinum; BPI: Platinum; IFPI DEN: Platinum; MC: 4× Platinum; PROMUSICAE: Gold; RMNZ: 3× Platinum
Speak Now (Taylor's Version)	Released: July 7, 2023; Label: Republic; Formats: CD, LP, digital download, cassette, streaming	1	1	1	6	1	1	2	1	1	1	US: 908,000 (Note: US sales for Speak Now (Taylor's Version) as of January 2024); UK: 209,302	RIAA: 4× Platinum; ARIA: Platinum; BPI: Platinum; IFPI DEN: Gold; MC: 2× Platinum; PROMUSICAE: Gold; RMNZ: Platinum
1989 (Taylor's Version)	Released: October 27, 2023; Label: Republic; Formats: CD, LP, digital download, cassette, streaming	1	1	1	1	1	1	1	1	1	1	US: 2,389,000; UK: 390,226	RIAA: 4× Platinum; ARIA: 3× Platinum; BPI: 2× Platinum; IFPI DEN: Platinum; MC: 4× Platinum; PROMUSICAE: Platinum; RMNZ: 3× Platinum
"—" denotes a recording that did not chart in that territory.

== Extended plays ==
List of extended plays, with selected chart positions, sales figures and certifications
Title	Details	Peak chart positions	Sales	Certifications
Title	Details	US	Sales	Certifications
Napster Live	Released: October 24, 2006 (Napster exclusive); Label: Big Machine; Formats: Digital download, streaming	64		
The Taylor Swift Holiday Collection	Released: October 14, 2007; Label: Big Machine; Formats: CD, digital download, streaming	20	US: 1,100,000	RIAA: Platinum; ARIA: Gold
Rhapsody Originals	Released: November 2007 (Rhapsody exclusive); Label: Big Machine; Format: Digital download, streaming	—		
iTunes Live from SoHo	Released: January 15, 2008 (iTunes exclusive); Label: Big Machine; Formats: Digital download, streaming	—		
Beautiful Eyes	Released: July 15, 2008 (Walmart exclusive); Label: Big Machine; Formats: CD+DVD	9	US: 369,000	
Spotify Singles	Released: April 13, 2018 (Spotify-exclusive); Label: Big Machine; Formats: Streaming	—		
"—" denotes a recording that did not chart in that territory.

== Live albums ==
List of live albums, with selected chart positions, sales figures and certifications
Title	Details	Peak positions								Sales	Certifications
Title	Details	US	AUS	CAN	DEN	IRE	NZ	SPA	UK	Sales	Certifications
Speak Now World Tour – Live	Released: November 21, 2011; Label: Big Machine; Formats: Digital download, streaming, CD+DVD/Blu-ray	11	16	25	—	—	—	91	— (Note: Speak Now World Tour – Live did not enter the UK Albums Chart, but it peaked at number 1 on the UK Music Videos Chart.)	US: 376,000	ARIA: Gold
Live from Clear Channel Stripped 2008	Released: April 23, 2020; Label: Big Machine; Formats: Digital download, streaming	—	—	—	—	—	—	—	—		
Folklore: The Long Pond Studio Sessions	Released: November 24, 2020; Label: Republic; Formats: Digital download, streaming, LP	3	24	—	12	6	24	—	4	US: 75,000 (Note: US first-week sales for Folklore: The Long Pond Studio Sessions (From the Disney+ Special))	
Lover (Live from Paris)	Released: February 14, 2023; Label: Republic; Formats: Digital download, LP	2	14	39	—	2	—	—	1	US: 219,500 (Note: US sales for Lover (Live from Paris) as of July 2025)	
"—" denotes a recording that did not chart in that territory.

== Compilation albums ==
=== Streaming-exclusive compilations ===
Title	Details	Description
Reputation Stadium Tour Surprise Song Playlist	Released: November 30, 2018; Label: Big Machine	A compilation consisting of "surprise songs" that Swift performed on her Reputation Stadium Tour.
Folklore: The Escapism Chapter	Released: August 21, 2020; Label: Republic	Compilations consisting of songs from Folklore.
Folklore: The Sleepless Nights Chapter	Released: August 24, 2020; Label: Republic	Compilations consisting of songs from Folklore.
Folklore: The Saltbox House Chapter	Released: August 27, 2020; Label: Republic	Compilations consisting of songs from Folklore.
Folklore: The Yeah I Showed Up at Your Party Chapter	Released: September 21, 2020; Label: Republic	A compilation consisting of songs from Folklore and a live performance of "Betty" at the 55th Academy of Country Music Awards (2020).
The "Dropped Your Hand While Dancing" Chapter	Released: January 21, 2021; Label: Republic	Compilations consisting of songs from Folklore and Evermore.
The "Forever Is the Sweetest Con" Chapter	Released: January 28, 2021; Label: Republic	Compilations consisting of songs from Folklore and Evermore.
The "Ladies Lunching" Chapter	Released: February 4, 2021; Label: Republic	Compilations consisting of songs from Folklore and Evermore.
Fearless (Taylor's Version): The Halfway Out the Door Chapter	Released: May 13, 2021; Label: Republic	Compilations consisting of songs from Fearless (Taylor's Version).
Fearless (Taylor's Version): The Kissing in the Rain Chapter	Released: May 19, 2021; Label: Republic	Compilations consisting of songs from Fearless (Taylor's Version).
Fearless (Taylor's Version): The I Remember What You Said Last Night Chapter	Released: May 24, 2021; Label: Republic	Compilations consisting of songs from Fearless (Taylor's Version).
Fearless (Taylor's Version): The From the Vault Chapter	Released: May 26, 2021; Label: Republic	Compilations consisting of songs from Fearless (Taylor's Version).
Red (Taylor's Version): Could You Be the One Chapter	Released: January 13, 2022; Label: Republic	Compilations consisting of songs from Red (Taylor's Version).
Red (Taylor's Version): She Wrote a Song About Me Chapter	Released: January 18, 2022; Label: Republic	Compilations consisting of songs from Red (Taylor's Version).
Red (Taylor's Version): The Slow Motion Chapter	Released: January 25, 2022; Label: Republic	Compilations consisting of songs from Red (Taylor's Version).
Red (Taylor's Version): From the Vault Chapter	Released: January 31, 2022; Label: Republic	Compilations consisting of songs from Red (Taylor's Version).
The More Fearless (Taylor's Version) Chapter	Released: March 17, 2023; Label: Republic	A compilation consisting of songs from Fearless (Taylor's Version) and "If This Was a Movie (Taylor's Version)".
The More Lover Chapter	Released: March 17, 2023; Label: Republic	A compilation consisting of songs from Lover and "All of the Girls You Loved Before".
The More Red (Taylor's Version) Chapter	Released: March 17, 2023; Label: Republic	A compilation consisting of songs from Red (Taylor's Version), "Eyes Open (Taylor's Version)" and "Safe & Sound (Taylor's Version)" featuring Joy Williams and John Paul White.
The Tortured Poets Department | TS The Eras Tour Setlist	Released: October 3, 2024; Label: Republic	A compilation consisting of songs from The Tortured Poets Department set at the Eras Tour.

=== Box sets ===
Title	Details	Description
Complete Album Collection	Released: November 22, 2013; Format: CD; Label: Universal	A German-exclusive box set consisting of 5 CDs — Taylor Swift, Fearless, Speak Now, Red, and Speak Now World Tour – Live.

== See also ==
- List of artists who have achieved simultaneous number-one single and album in the United States
