= How You Get the Girl =

2014 song by Taylor Swift

Song by Taylor Swift

from the album 1989
- Released: October 27, 2014
- Studio: MXM (Stockholm); Conway Recording (Los Angeles)
- Genre: Bubblegum; electropop
- Length: 4:07
- Label: Big Machine
- Songwriters: Taylor Swift; Max Martin; Shellback
- Producers: Max Martin; Shellback

Audio video
- "How You Get the Girl" on YouTube

"How You Get the Girl" is a song by the American singer-songwriter Taylor Swift from her fifth studio album, 1989 (2014). She wrote it with its producers, Max Martin and Shellback. Categorized in the bubblegum and electropop genres, "How You Get the Girl" is a sentimental ballad that features acoustic guitar strums and a heavy disco beat. The lyrics find Swift telling a man how to win his ex-girlfriend back after their breakup. The track was used in a Diet Coke advertisement prior to its release.

Some music critics praised the song as catchy and energetic; they particularly highlighted the chorus and how the track combines acoustic and electronic elements. Less enthusiastic reviews considered the production generic and the lyrics lightweight. "How You Get the Girl" charted on the Bubbling Under Hot 100 chart in the United States and on the Canadian Hot 100 chart. It received certifications in Australia, New Zealand, the United Kingdom, and the United States. Swift included "How You Get the Girl" in the set list of the 1989 World Tour (2015), with choreography that evoked the musical film Singin' in the Rain (1952). She performed it on some dates of her later tours, the Reputation Stadium Tour (2018) and the Eras Tour (2023–2024).

Following a 2019 dispute regarding the ownership of her back catalog, Swift re-recorded the song as "How You Get the Girl (Taylor's Version)" for her fourth re-recorded album, 1989 (Taylor's Version) (2023). She produced the new version with Christopher Rowe. Music critics believed that the re-recording had a vibrant sound and an enhanced production quality. The track reached number 29 on the Billboard Global 200 chart and the top 40 on the national charts of Canada, New Zealand, and the United States.

== Background and release ==
Taylor Swift had identified as a country musician until her fourth studio album, Red (2012). The record incorporates eclectic pop and rock styles beyond the country stylings of her past albums, (Note: Namely, Taylor Swift (2006), Fearless (2008), and Speak Now (2010).) which led to journalists questioning her country-music identity. She began writing songs for her fifth studio album in 2013 while embarking on the Red Tour (2013–2014) and named it 1989 after her birth year to signify an artistic reinvention. Described by Swift as her first "official pop album", it was inspired by 1980s synth-pop and musical experimentation. Big Machine Records released 1989 on October 27, 2014, to critical praise and commercial success; "How You Get the Girl" is the album's tenth track.

Prior to its release, "How You Get the Girl" was used in a Diet Coke advertisement in which the number of cats increased whenever Swift took a sip from a can of Diet Coke. The advertisement featured her cat Olivia Benson. In the United States, the track reached number four on the Billboard Bubbling Under Hot 100 chart dated November 15, 2014. It also reached number 81 on the Canadian Hot 100 chart. "How You Get the Girl" was certified platinum in Australia, gold in New Zealand and the United States, and silver in the United Kingdom.

== Production and composition ==
Max Martin and Shellback produced seven of the thirteen tracks on 1989's standard edition, including "How You Get the Girl". Swift co-wrote the song with Martin and Shellback, who both programmed it and played electronic keyboards. Shellback additionally played bass guitar, drums, and guitars. The track was recorded by Sam Holland at Conway Recording Studios in Los Angeles and by Michael Ilbert at MXM Studios in Stockholm, Sweden. It was mixed by Serban Ghenea at Mixstar Studios in Virginia Beach, Virginia, and mastered by Tom Coyne at Sterling Sound in New York.

"How You Get the Girl"
A sample of the chorus of "How You Get the Girl", featuring a disco-heavy beat and cue card-styled lyrics instructing a man to show his commitment to his girlfriend

"How You Get the Girl" is four minutes and seven seconds long. It is set over a tempo of 120 beats per minute and follows a chord progression consisting of all major chords: F–C–B♭. Categorized in the bubblegum and electropop genres, "How You Get the Girl" is a sentimental ballad with a midtempo rhythm and an upbeat arrangement. The production incorporates reverberated sixteenth-note acoustic guitar strums, three acoustic guitar chords, and a heavy disco-styled beat. "How You Get the Girl" also features pop dance-style vocals, radio-friendly vocal harmonies, and beatboxing vocal percussion. The Quietus's Amy Pettifer likened the "metaphorical distance and melancholy" of the song to the music of Cyndi Lauper, the Bangles, and Stevie Nicks, while Stereogum's Tom Breihan thought that "How You Get the Girl" had the shimmery elements of Debbie Gibson's music.

In the physical booklet of 1989, Swift provided a secret message for each track which collectively tells a short story that reflects the album's theme of self-discovery. The secret message for "How You Get the Girl" was "then one day he came back". Swift described the track as a tutorial to a man on how to win his ex-girlfriend back, six months after their breakup. In the second verse, she tells the man to remember the good times between him and the woman ("Tell her how you must have lost your mind/ When you left her all alone/ and never told her why"). She explains in the pre-chorus: "That's how you lost the girl". Swift instructs him in the chorus in the form of cue cards that in order for the woman to forgive him, he needs to show his commitment in the relationship ("Then you say/ I want you for worse or for better/ I would wait for ever and ever/ Broke your heart, I'll put it back together/ I would wait for ever and ever"). The outro, which is written in past tense, suggests a reunion between the two lovers and a happy ending ("And that's how it works/ that's how you got the girl"). Pettifer found the song's lyrical imagery similar to "saccharine fairy tales".

== Critical reception ==
When "How You Get the Girl" was first released, some music critics praised the song as catchy and for having an ability to combine Swift's old and new sounds. Rob Sheffield of Rolling Stone selected "How You Get the Girl" as one of the three best tracks on the album and thought that it combined the best of Swift's "old and new tricks": her acoustic arrangements and Martin's disco-heavy production. In a retrospective ranking of Swift's discography in 2025, he ranked the song at number 110 out of 286 tracks. Nylon's Leila Brillson similarly said that "How You Get the Girl" matched the "new Taylor with the old" and described it as "the most familiar-feeling Taylor song" on 1989. She questioned Swift's decision over not having released the song as the album's lead single. Philadelphia's Brandon Baker dubbed "How You Get the Girl" an "earworm" and picked it as one of the songs that made 1989 the "catchiest and most radio-ready pop album of the year", and Ken Tucker, in a review for NPR, considered it one of the songs that "nod fondly at youth while yielding the pleasures of adult artistry", which he thought to be the key to the album's success. Several critics praised the chorus of "How You Get the Girl", including Brillson, MusicOMH's Shane Kimberlin, and PopMatters's Corey Beasley.

Other critics considered the theme and production of "How You Get the Girl" generic and unremarkable. (Note: Critics such as Eakin, The New York Times' John Caramanica, and The Guardian's Alexis Petridis) John Caramanica of The New York Times regarded the song as ineffective, and Alexis Petridis of The Guardian described it as "a knowing checklist of the kind of love-song platitudes that Swift's peers might easily punt out with a straight face". Marah Eakin from The A.V. Club found the song's midtempo balladic production similar to Swift's other works and inconspicuous compared to the rest of the album, saying that it seemed "out of place". Spin's Andrew Unterberger similarly considered it one of the tracks that deviated from the album's 1980s pop sound and described it as a "breezy-but-slight acoustic romp".

Some critics deemed the lyrics straightforward and underwhelming. (Note: Critics such as the Los Angeles Times' Mikael Wood and Business Insider's Courteney Larocca) Mikael Wood of the Los Angeles Times described the lyricism as "clunky and bland at the same time", and Courteney Larocca of Business Insider thought that the lyrics were disappointing to Swift's female fans. The latter highlighted the problematic nature of encouraging men to persistently pursue their ex-girlfriends, arguing that relationships typically end for valid reasons. Allie Volpe of The Seattle Times and Eakin deemed "How You Get the Girl" one of 1989's fillers that Swift made in order to make it have a total of thirteen tracks. In 2019, Larocca considered it one of her 17 worst songs, while Vulture's Nate Jones placed it at number 126 out of 245 songs in a 2024 ranking of her discography, dubbing it the "breeziest and least complicated" song out of her "guy-standing-on-a-doorstep" songs.

== Live performances and other usage ==
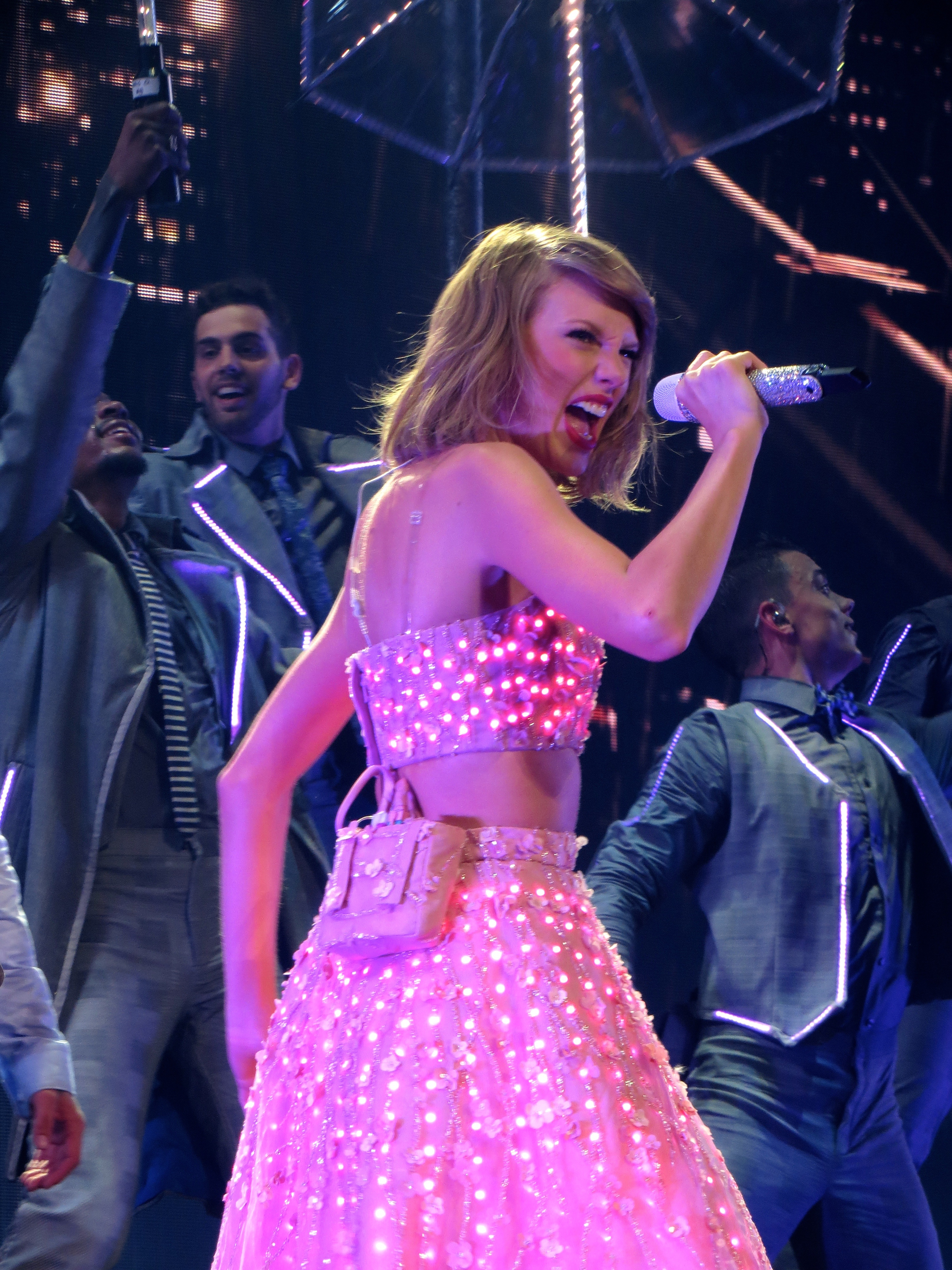
The performance of "How You Get the Girl" on the 1989 World Tour was accompanied by a choreography inspired by the musical Singin' in the Rain.

Swift included "How You Get the Girl" in the set list of the 1989 World Tour (2015). She sang it wearing a glowing pink polka dot two-piece dress, accompanied by choreography performed by backup dancers with neon umbrellas. Several media publications thought that the choreography evoked the musical film Singin' in the Rain (1952). (Note: As discussed by The Independent's David Pollock, The Observer's Kitty Empire, The San Diego Union-Tribune's George Varga, Vulture's Claire Landsbaum, and BBC News' Neil Smith) Swift performed "How You Get the Girl" on acoustic guitar during the second Dublin show of the Reputation Stadium Tour (2018) and the first Sydney show of the Eras Tour (2023–2024). She played the track on piano during the final Atlanta and New Orleans shows of the Eras Tour, the latter performance in a mashup with her song "Clean" (2014). During the final Stockholm show of the tour, Swift performed "How You Get the Girl" on acoustic guitar as part of a medley with her singles "Message in a Bottle" (2021) and "New Romantics" (2016). She dedicated the performance to Martin, who was present in the audience.

Ryan Adams, an American singer-songwriter, recorded "How You Get the Girl" as part of his track-by-track cover album of 1989, which was released on September 21, 2015. He stated that Swift's 1989 helped him cope with emotional hardships and that he wanted to interpret the songs from his perspective "like it was Bruce Springsteen's Nebraska". Described by Swift as a "neat twist on the original", Adams's version of "How You Get the Girl" forgoes the original's upbeat production in favor of an acoustic guitar and string arrangement. Adams kept the pronouns that Swift had used in the song the same as her version. Entertainment Weekly's Leah Greenblatt described his version as a "pretty, ruminative ballad", while Unterberger considered the balladic production unremarkable. Billboard's Chris Payne picked it as his sixth-favorite track on the cover album, adding that "flipping the song's speaker and subject elicits all kinds of dynamics worth pondering".

== Personnel ==
Credits shown below are adapted from the liner notes of the album 1989.

- Taylor Swift – lead vocals, background vocals, songwriter
- Max Martin – producer, songwriter, programmer, keyboards
- Shellback – producer, songwriter, programmer, bass guitar, drums, guitars, keyboards
- Michael Ilbert – recording engineer
- Sam Holland – recording engineer
- Cory Bice – assistant recording engineer
- Serban Ghenea – mixer
- Tom Coyne – mastering engineer

== Charts ==
Chart performance for "How You Get the Girl"
Chart (2014)	Peak position
Canada Hot 100 (Billboard)	81
US Bubbling Under Hot 100 (Billboard)	4
US Digital Song Sales (Billboard)	38

== Certifications ==
Certifications for "How You Get the Girl"
Region	Certification	Certified units/sales
Australia (ARIA)	Platinum	70,000^{‡}
New Zealand (RMNZ)	Gold	15,000^{‡}
United Kingdom (BPI)	Silver	200,000^{‡}
United States (RIAA)	Gold	500,000^{‡}
^{‡} Sales+streaming figures based on certification alone.

== "How You Get the Girl (Taylor's Version)" ==
"How You Get the Girl (Taylor's Version)"

Song by Taylor Swift

from the album 1989 (Taylor's Version)
- Released: October 27, 2023
- Studio: Kitty Committee (New York)
- Length: 4:07
- Label: Republic
- Songwriters: Taylor Swift; Max Martin; Shellback
- Producers: Taylor Swift; Christopher Rowe

Lyric video
- "How You Get the Girl (Taylor's Version)" on YouTube

Swift departed from Big Machine and signed with Republic Records in November 2018. She began re-recording her first six studio albums in November 2020. The decision followed a public dispute in 2019 between her and the talent manager Scooter Braun, who acquired Big Machine including the master recordings of her albums which the label had released. By re-recording the albums, Swift had full ownership of the new masters, which enabled her to control the licensing of her songs for commercial use and therefore substitute the Big Machine–owned masters.

The re-recording of "How You Get the Girl", subtitled "Taylor's Version", was released as part of Swift's fourth re-recorded album, 1989 (Taylor's Version), on October 27, 2023. She produced the track with Christopher Rowe, who recorded her vocals at Kitty Committee Studio in New York. It was engineered by Derek Garten at Prime Recording Studio in Nashville, Tennessee; mixed by Ghenea at MixStar Studios in Virginia Beach, Virginia; and mastered by Randy Merrill at Sterling Sound in Edgewater, New Jersey. "How You Get the Girl (Taylor's Version)" is four minutes and seven seconds long.

=== Reception ===
Critics praised "How You Get the Girl (Taylor's Version)" for its production and energetic sound. (Note: Critics such as The Atlantic's Spencer Kornhaber, Slant Magazine's Jonathan Keefe, and Rolling Stone UK's Mark Sutherland) The Atlantic's Spencer Kornhaber deemed it one of 1989 (Taylor's Version)'s adrenaline-pumping and centerpiece tracks, and Slant Magazine's Jonathan Keefe commented that the production "packs even greater heft" on the new version and considered it one of the tracks that validates the re-recorded album. Mark Sutherland from Rolling Stone UK lauded the song's "irresistible groove" and wrote although the track was not originally released as a single, it sounded like a "monster hit". In a less enthusiastic review, Callie Ahlgrim of Business Insider likened the song's production to music on Radio Disney, describing the track as "cloying and juvenile" and regarding it as one of the album's five worst songs.

"How You Get the Girl (Taylor's Version)" reached number 29 on the Billboard Global 200 chart dated November 11, 2023. It debuted at number 40 on the Billboard Hot 100 chart in the United States, extending Swift's record for the most top-40 chart entries by a female artist. "How You Get the Girl (Taylor's Version)" charted in Canada and New Zealand, with peaks of 34 and 31, respectively. It was certified gold in Australia.

=== Personnel ===
Credits shown below are adapted from the liner notes of the album 1989 (Taylor's Version).

- Taylor Swift – lead vocals, background vocals, songwriter, producer
- Christopher Rowe – producer, vocals recording
- Derek Garten – additional programmer, engineer, digital editor
- Dan Burns – synth bass programmer, synth programmer, drums programmer, additional engineer
- Randy Merrill – mastering engineer
- Ryan Smith – mastering engineer
- Serban Ghenea – mixer
- Bryce Bordone – engineer for mix
- Matt Billingslea – drums programmer, percussion programmer
- Brian Pruitt – drums programmer, percussion programmer
- Max Bernstein – electric guitar, synthesizer
- Mike Meadows – acoustic guitar, synthesizer
- Amos Heller – bass guitar
- Paul Sidoti – electric guitar
- Max Martin – songwriter
- Shellback – songwriter

=== Charts ===
Chart performance for "How You Get the Girl (Taylor's Version)"
Chart (2023)	Peak position
Canada (Canadian Hot 100)	34
Global 200 (Billboard)	29
New Zealand (Recorded Music NZ)	31
US Billboard Hot 100	40

=== Certifications ===
Certifications for "How You Get the Girl (Taylor's Version)"
Region	Certification	Certified units/sales
Australia (ARIA)	Gold	35,000^{‡}
^{‡} Sales+streaming figures based on certification alone.
