= Beautiful Eyes =

EP by Taylor Swift
- Released: July 15, 2008
- Studios: Schmudio; Quad; Eagle Eye; Sound Cottage; Sound Emporium; Abtrax Recording; Masterfonics (Nashville)
- Length: 19:26
- Label: Big Machine
- Producers: Robert Ellis Orrall; Angelo Petraglia; Nathan Chapman

Taylor Swift chronology
The Taylor Swift Holiday Collection (2007)	Beautiful Eyes (2008)	Fearless (2008)

Beautiful Eyes is the second extended play (EP) by the American singer-songwriter Taylor Swift. It was released as a Walmart exclusive on July 15, 2008, through Big Machine Records. In later years, after the MP3 service got closed down, Walmart transferred the rights to Amazon for their Amazon MP3 service, where it remains exclusively available in the United States.

Beautiful Eyes consists of alternate versions of tracks from Swift's 2006 debut album Taylor Swift and two original tracks—"Beautiful Eyes" and "I Heart ?"—which Swift had composed as early as 2006. The physical edition of the EP also features a DVD including music videos of singles from Taylor Swift.

Beautiful Eyes peaked at number 9 on the US Billboard 200 and topped Billboard'sTop Country Albums. "I Heart ?", which had been released as part of a Best Buy-exclusive version CD of Taylor Swift, was released as a promotional single in June 2008. "Beautiful Eyes" was also released as part of Swift's promotional deal with the magazine Seventeen.

== Background ==
Swift earned commercial success in the country music scene with her debut album, Taylor Swift (2006), and began working on her second album in 2007. During that time, she received a number of e-mails from fans requesting for new material to be released, which drove Swift into releasing Beautiful Eyes: "I thought this might tide them over till the new album comes out in the fall."

Beautiful Eyes includes new versions of tracks from Taylor Swift: an alternate version of "Should've Said No", the fifth single from the album, an acoustic version of "Teardrops on My Guitar", the second single from the album, a radio edit of "Picture to Burn", the fourth single from the album, and "I'm Only Me when I'm with You", a promotional single from the album. The EP also features two original songs, "Beautiful Eyes" and "I Heart?", which she previously wrote in 2003. The EP's DVD features music videos from the singles from Taylor Swift, as well as a music video made for "Beautiful Eyes" from footage from Swift's eighteenth birthday party.

Swift did not want any misconceptions of Beautiful Eyes as her second album and therefore partnered with the American retail company Walmart to make the EP an exclusive release. The album was only made available through American Wal-Mart stores and Wal-Mart's website. Furthermore, it was made a limited release because Swift only allowed Big Machine Records to manufacture a certain number. She said, "I’m only letting my record company make a small amount of these. The last thing I want any of you to think is that we are putting out too many releases."

== Commercial performance and reception ==
Professional ratings
Review scores
Source	Rating
AllMusic	3/5 stars

On the week ending August 2, 2008, Beautiful Eyes debuted at number 9 on the Billboard 200 due to sales of 45,000 copies. The EP spent a total of twenty weeks on the Billboard 200. On the same week, it debuted at number 1 on Top Country Albums, replacing her own album Taylor Swift at the top. With Taylor Swift charting at number 2, Swift became the first artist to hold the first two positions on Top Country Albums since LeAnn Rimes charted in 1997 with Blue (1996) and Unchained Melody: The Early Years (1997). The following week, the EP slipped to number two and, in total, it spent twenty-eight weeks on Top Country Albums. As of July 2019, the EP has sold 359,000 copies in the United States.

== Promotion ==
"I Heart ?" was released as a promotional single from Beautiful Eyes on June 23, 2008. Swift promoted Beautiful Eyes minimally for the reason being she did not want for misconceptions of the EP being her second album, although she did perform the title track at different venues. She first performed "Beautiful Eyes" on January 23, 2005, at the 2005 NAMM Show, an annual music product trade show held in Anaheim, California at the Anaheim Convention Center. The performance featured Swift, dressed in a red blouse and blue jeans, performing acoustically with a guitar, sitting on a bar stool. "Beautiful Eyes" was later performed as part of Swift's set for iHeartRadio.com's Stripped on August 5, 2008; she wore a black, one-shoulder dress and performed with a back-up band while playing a rhinestoned acoustic guitar.

== Track listing ==
Disc one (CD)
No.	Title	Writer(s)	Producer(s)	Length
1.	"Beautiful Eyes"	Taylor Swift	Robert Ellis Orrall	2:58
2.	"Should've Said No" (alternate version)	Swift	Nathan Chapman	3:46
3.	"Teardrops on My Guitar" (acoustic version)	Swift; Liz Rose	Chapman	2:58
4.	"Picture to Burn" (radio edit)	Swift; Rose	Chapman	2:54
5.	"I'm Only Me When I'm with You"	Swift; Orrall; Angelo Petraglia	Orrall; Petraglia	3:35
6.	"I Heart ?"	Swift	Orrall	3:15
Total length:				19:26

Disc two (DVD)
No.	Title	Director(s)	Length
1.	"Beautiful Eyes" (music video)	Trey Fanjoy; Todd Cassetty	2:56
2.	"Picture to Burn" (music video)	Fanjoy	3:36
3.	"I'm Only Me When I'm with You" (music video)	Swift	3:47
4.	"Tim McGraw" (music video)	Fanjoy	4:00
5.	"Teardrops on My Guitar" (pop version) (music video)	Fanjoy	3:26
6.	"Our Song" (music video)	Fanjoy	3:30
7.	"Picture to Burn" ('making of' video)	Cassetty	22:02
8.	"GAC new artist special"		14:45
9.	"Should've Said No" (2008 ACM Awards performance)		4:04
Total length:			60:46

== Personnel ==
Credits adapted from the album's liner notes

- Taylor Swift – lead vocals
- Ken Love – mastering
- Nathan Chapman – production & acoustic guitar (2–4), harmony vocals (3, 4), mixing & recording (3), electric guitar & additional recording (4)
- Robert Ellis Orrall – production & background vocals (1, 5, 6), additional recording (1)
- Chris Rowe – mixing, shaker, synthpad, organ & guitar (1), digital editing (6)
- Gary Burnette – guitars (1, 6), bass (1)
- Chad Carlson – recording (2, 4), mixing (2), additional recording (4)
- Wanda Vick – mandolin (5, 6), banjo (6)
- Caitlin Evanson – fiddle & harmony vocals (2)
- Paul Sidoti – electric guitar & harmony vocals (2)
- Tony Harrell – keyboards (5, 6)
- Dan Dugmore – steel (5, 6)
- Ken Lewis – drums (1)
- Rusty Danmyer – steel (1)
- Eric Richardson – recording (1)
- Ben Clark – banjo (2)
- Al Wilson – drums (2)
- Amos Heller – bass (2)
- Grant Mickelson – electric guitar (2)
- Chuck Ainlay – mixing (4)
- Scott Kidd – mixing (4)
- Steve Short – engineering (4)
- Nick Buda – drums (4)
- Eric Darken – percussion (4)
- Rob Hajacos – fiddle (4)
- Jeff Hyde – banjo (4)
- Tim Marks – bass (4)
- Scotty Sanders – steel (4)
- John Willis – mandolin (4)
- Angelo – production (5)
- Jamie Tate – mixing (5)
- A.J. Derrick – recording (5)
- Steve Bryant – bass (5)
- Dennis Holt – drums (5)
- Troy Lancaster – electric guitar (5)
- Lorraine Morrison – background vocals (5)
- Curt Ryle – acoustic guitar (5)
- Ben Fowler – mixing (6)
- Jason Lefan – engineering (6)
- Allen Ditto – recording (6)
- Clarke Schleicher – recording (6)
- Mike Brignardello – bass (6)
- Shannon Forrest – drums (6)
- Liana Manis – background vocals (6)

== Charts ==
=== Weekly charts ===
Weekly chart performance
Chart (2008)	Peak position
US Billboard 200	9
US Top Country Albums (Billboard)	1

=== Year-end charts ===
Year-end chart performance
Chart (2008)	Position
US Billboard 200	192
US Top Country Albums (Billboard)	32
