= The Taylor Swift Holiday Collection =

- Re-release cover (Note: The original cover features the title Sounds of the Season: The Taylor Swift Holiday Collection.)

EP by Taylor Swift
- Released: October 14, 2007
- Recorded: 2007
- Studios: Sound Emporium (Nashville); Quad Studios (Nashville)
- Genres: Christmas; country pop
- Length: 19:15
- Label: Big Machine
- Producer: Nathan Chapman

Taylor Swift chronology
Taylor Swift (2006)	The Taylor Swift Holiday Collection (2007)	Beautiful Eyes (2008)

The Taylor Swift Holiday Collection (Note: Originally released under the title Sounds of the Season: The Taylor Swift Holiday Collection) is the first extended play and Christmas record by the American singer-songwriter Taylor Swift. It was released as a Target exclusive on October 14, 2007, in partnership with Big Machine Records, and became available at other retailers on December 2, 2008.

The Taylor Swift Holiday Collection consists of six tracks—four are cover versions of Christmas songs ("Last Christmas", "Santa Baby", "Silent Night", and "White Christmas") and two are original tracks written by Swift ("Christmases When You Were Mine" and "Christmas Must Be Something More"). Produced by Nathan Chapman, the EP features a country pop sound with instruments such as guitars, banjos, fiddles, and mandolins. Songs from the EP received airplay on US country radio, with "Last Christmas" becoming the best-charting track, peaking at number 28 on the Hot Country Songs chart.

Some music critics praised Swift's two original songs and wished that The Taylor Swift Holiday Collection had been longer, while others disliked the country-pop makeover of the Christmas classics. The EP peaked at number 20 on the US Billboard 200 and number one on the Top Holiday Albums chart. It received a platinum certification and sold over one million copies in the United States.

== Release ==
For the release of The Taylor Swift Holiday Collection, Taylor Swift and Big Machine Records partnered with Target, which exclusively distributed the EP in the United States. It was commercially released via Target on October 14, 2007, under the title Sounds of the Season: The Taylor Swift Holiday Collection. The cover artwork is taken from Swift's music video for "Teardrops on My Guitar" (2007).

The Taylor Swift Holiday Collection was released to other retailers on December 2, 2008, including iTunes and Amazon. Both retailers made minor adjustments to its cover and removed Sounds of the Season: from the title, leaving it simply The Taylor Swift Holiday Collection. On October 6, 2009, The Taylor Swift Holiday Collection was re-released by Target and made available for digital download.

== Composition ==
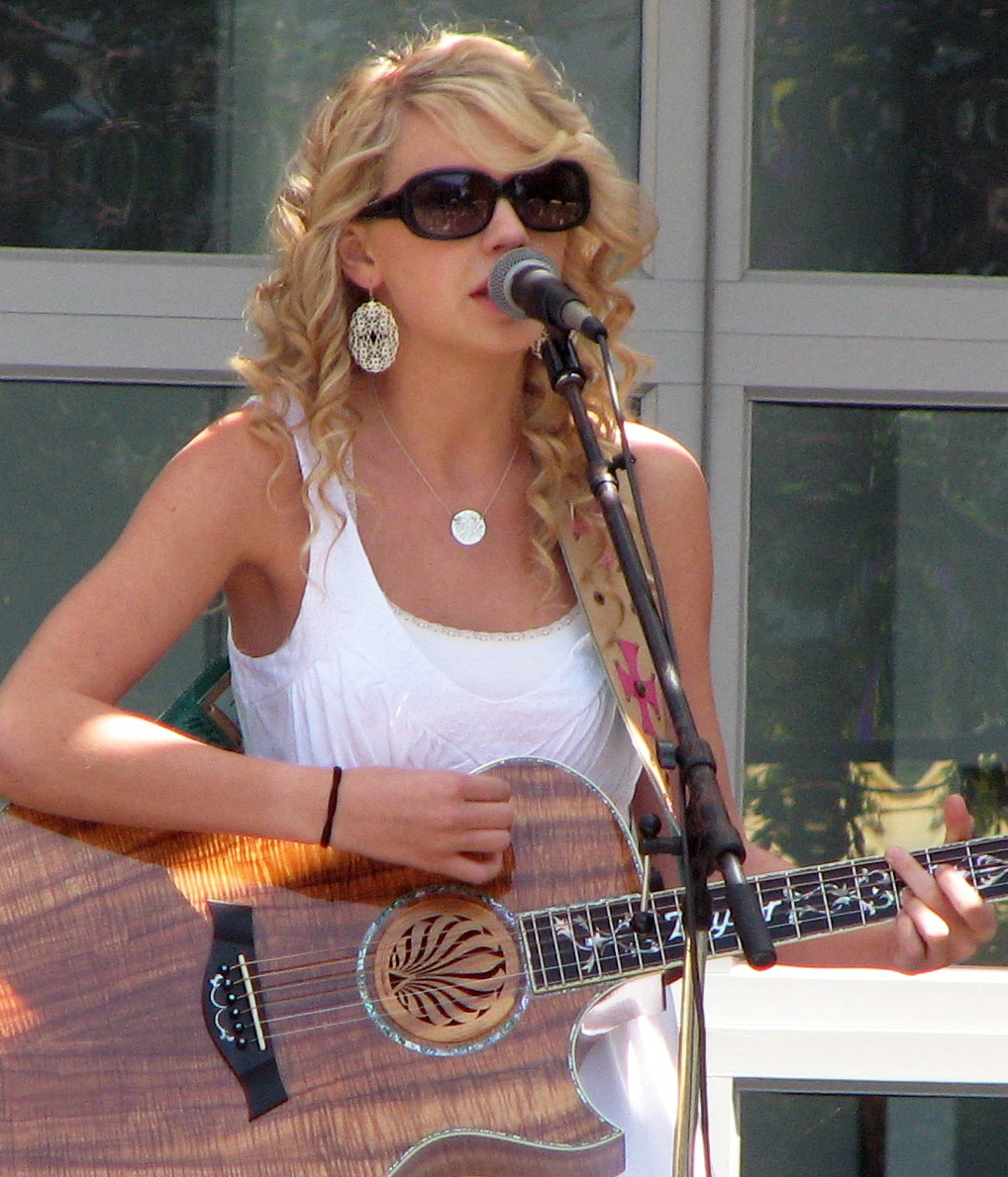
Swift (pictured in 2007) wrote two original tracks for The Taylor Swift Holiday Collection.

Produced by Nathan Chapman, The Taylor Swift Holiday Collection is a Christmas record with "cheerful arrangements that are suitably seasonal but also faithful to [Swift's] bright country-pop", according to AllMusic's Stephen Thomas Erlewine. The EP features four cover versions of Christmas tracks and two original songs that Swift wrote. The Taylor Swift Holiday Collection's opening track is a cover version of Wham!'s "Last Christmas" (1984), incorporating country guitar licks, chiming bells, an upbeat arrangement, and Swift's "country-girl vocals". The original song "Christmases When You Were Mine" was written by Swift, Chapman, and Liz Rose. It is an acoustic guitar-driven sentimental ballad with lyrics about a past romantic relationship and past Christmases, when the song's narrator was happier. The third track is a cover version of Eartha Kitt's "Santa Baby" (1953), featuring guitar strums and a slight twang in Swift's voice.

The fourth track is an acoustic rendition of "Silent Night" (1818), showcasing significant melodic changes and Swift's high-pitched vocals, which differ from the original version's lullaby atmosphere. The song ends with a repeated "hallelujah" refrain that resembles gospel music. "Christmas Must Be Something More", the second original track from The Taylor Swift Holiday Collection, was written solely by Swift. Its lyrics encourage the listeners to reflect on the true meaning of Christmas: the celebration of Jesus Christ's birth. The closing track is a cover version of Bing Crosby's "White Christmas" (1942), featuring a country-leaning production that incorporates fiddles and banjos.

== Promotion ==
On November 27, 2007, Swift promoted The Taylor Swift Holiday Collection through an autograph-signing event held at NBC's Experience Store in New York City. The following day, she performed "Silent Night" as part of NBC's television special Christmas in Rockefeller Center in New York City. She performed "Santa Baby" at Mall of America in Bloomington, Minnesota, on December 8, 2007. Swift appeared on The Today Show on Christmas Day in 2007, performing "Christmases When You Were Mine" and "Silent Night".

During the Christmas season of 2007, Swift had promotional campaigns with Verizon and LG Voyager. Songs from the EP received airplay on US country radio starting the week of December 10, 2007, with "Last Christmas" being the most-added Christmas song of the week. "Santa Baby" and "Christmases When You Were Mine" were among the top 100 most-played country-music holiday songs of 2007 in the United States. For the 2008 holiday season, all songs from The Taylor Swift Holiday Collection were again played on US country radio stations, starting the week of November 24, 2008. "Last Christmas" was among the top 10 most-played holiday songs that season.

All tracks from The Taylor Swift Holiday Collection except "Christmas Must Be Something More" charted on Billboard's airplay chart Hot Country Songs: "Last Christmas" peaked at number 28, Christmases When You Were Mine" at number 48, "Santa Baby" at number 43, "Silent Night" at number 54, and "White Christmas" at number 59. "Last Christmas" and "Santa Baby" also charted on Holiday 100, peaking at numbers 18 and 89, respectively. On the all-time Holiday 100 chart published by Billboard in 2016, Swift's "Last Christmas" ranked at number 56.

== Critical reception ==
The Taylor Swift Holiday Collection ratings
Review scores
Source	Rating
AllMusic	3/5 stars
Sputnikmusic	3/5 stars

Erlewine praised The Taylor Swift Holiday Collection for its "crisp, cheerful arrangements" and the way it "balances Swift's pop and country roots". Dan Maclntosh of Country Standard Time concluded, "Swift is a fine singer, who finds ways to inject sincere emotion into every line she sings. They say the best things come in small packages. And that saying holds true for Swift's new one." The Pittsburgh Tribune-Review's Kellie B. Gormly commented that The Taylor Swift Holiday Collection was "sweet" and highlighted the "deeply spiritual" track "Christmas Must Be Something More" as a standout. Sputnikmusic's staff writer thought that Swift's two original songs gave the EP a "thoroughly enjoyable, unique experience" and lauded the arrangement of "Last Christmas" as "extremely memorable". Craig Shelburne of CMT News said, "Thanks to this teen star, a new generation of sensitive girls may discover the melancholy but oh-so-melodic 'Last Christmas'".

David Yonke in The Blade said that he wished the EP had been longer and selected two tracks as highlights: "Christmases When You Were Mine" ("a mature, wistful ballad") and "Santa Baby" ("a sassy wink-and-a-nod to Mr. Claus"). Scott Iwasaki from Deseret News complimented Swift's self-penned songs and said the EP was generally fine, with the exception of "Silent Night", which he found heavy on the arrangement. Jonathan Takiff from the Philadelphia Daily News disapproved of the "fiddle and pedal steel-flavoring" makeovers of the Christmas covers, but praised Swift's original tracks with "the high gloss". The Florida Times-Union's Roger Bull wrote that the EP was not bad but questioned whether anyone other than teenage girls would buy it. In 2022, Billboard ranked The Taylor Swift Holiday Collection as the 17th-best Christmas record of the 21st century.

== Commercial performance ==
On the week ending December 8, 2007, The Taylor Swift Holiday Collection debuted at number 88 on the Billboard 200 in the United States. It debuted at number 18 on the Top Country Albums chart, selling 15,000 copies in the first week. The following week, the EP rose to a new peak at number 46 on the Billboard 200. Following its 2009 re-release, The Taylor Swift Holiday Collection peaked at number 20 on the Billboard 200 and extended its chart run to a total of 24 weeks. It also reached numbers 14 and 1 on the 2009 Top Country Albums and 2010 Top Holiday Albums charts for the holiday season. As of July 2019, the EP had sold 1.08 million copies in the United States.

== Track listing ==
All tracks are produced by Nathan Chapman.

The Taylor Swift Holiday Collection track listing
No.	Title	Writer(s)	Length
1.	"Last Christmas"	George Michael	3:28
2.	"Christmases When You Were Mine"	Taylor Swift; Liz Rose; Chapman	3:06
3.	"Santa Baby"	Joan Ellen Javits; Philip Springer; Tony Springer	2:41
4.	"Silent Night"	Joseph Mohr; Franz Xaver Gruber	3:32
5.	"Christmas Must Be Something More"	Swift	3:52
6.	"White Christmas"	Irving Berlin	2:34
Total length:			19:13

== Personnel ==
Credits are adapted from the EP's liner notes.

- Taylor Swift – lead vocals; arrangements for "Silent Night"
- Heidi Beall – background vocals
- Nick Buda – drums
- Nathan Chapman – producer, bass guitar, acoustic guitar, electric guitar, background vocals, mixing
- Eric Darken – percussion
- Rob Hajacos – fiddle
- Andy Leftwich – mandolin
- Tim Marks – bass guitar
- Scotty Sanders – Dobro
- Shelli Hill – executive producer
- Sue Peterson – executive producer
- Melinda Norris Photography – photographer
- Kyle Ford – assistant engineer
- Sandi Spika Borchetta – dress design, hair
- Chad Carlson – recording
- Mathieu Bitton – art direction, design
- Phil Schullo – additional engineering
- Whitney Sutton – production copy
- Lorri Turk – make-up
- Stacey Ward – project manager
- Hank Williams – mastering

== Charts ==
=== Weekly charts ===
2007–2011 weekly chart performance
Chart (2007–2011)	Peak position
Japanese Albums (Oricon)	76
South Korean Albums (Gaon)	68
US Billboard 200	20
US Top Country Albums (Billboard)	14
US Top Holiday Albums (Billboard)	1

2025 weekly chart performance
Chart (2025)	Peak position
Portuguese Albums (AFP)	155

=== Year-end charts ===
2010 year-end chart
Chart (2010)	Position
US Billboard 200	70

2011 year-end chart
Chart (2011)	Position
US Billboard 200	193

=== All-time chart ===
All-time chart
Chart	Position
US Top Holiday Albums (Billboard)	49

== Certifications ==
Region	Certification	Certified units/sales
Australia (ARIA)	Gold	35,000^{‡}
United States (RIAA)	Platinum	1,080,000
^{‡} Sales+streaming figures based on certification alone.

== See also ==
- List of Billboard Top Holiday Albums number ones of the 2010s
