= Lover (Live from Paris) =

- Limited-time digital download cover

Live album by Taylor Swift
- Released: February 14, 2023
- Recorded: September 9, 2019
- Venues: Olympia, Paris, France
- Length: 30:31
- Label: Republic
- Producer: Taylor Swift

Taylor Swift chronology
Midnights (2022)	Lover (Live from Paris) (2023)	Speak Now (Taylor's Version) (2023)

Lover (Live from Paris) is the fourth live album by the American singer-songwriter Taylor Swift, consisting of live renditions of songs that she performed at her one-off City of Lover concert in Paris, France, on September 9, 2019. The tracks had been released individually to streaming services on May 19, 2020, and they were compiled into Lover (Live from Paris), first released as a Valentine's Day limited-edition vinyl album on February 14, 2023, through Republic Records.

Lover (Live from Paris) debuted on record charts in Australia, the United Kingdom, and the United States, topping the US Billboard Vinyl Albums chart. The physical album was reissued on January 7, 2025, and a limited-time download album was released on January 16, 2025. Lover (Live from Paris) then topped the UK Albums Chart and peaked at number two on the Irish Albums Chart and the US Billboard 200 chart. The album went on to become a collectable among Swift's fans.

== Background and release ==
Taylor Swift's seventh studio album, Lover, was released on August 23, 2019, through Republic Records. To celebrate its release, she held the one-off concert City of Lover at the Olympia theater in Paris, France, on September 9, 2019. It would become Swift's only concert to support Lover.

On May 17, 2020, the concert was aired as a one-hour special, titled Taylor Swift: City of Lover, on ABC, and was later made available for on-demand streaming on Hulu and Disney+. The TV special featured eight songs from Lover and each of them was released on digital music platforms, except "The Man", which had been previously available for streaming since February 18, 2020.

On February 13, 2023, Swift announced a limited-edition set of two vinyl records for Lover (Live from Paris), released on Valentine's Day. Each package contained two heart-shaped vinyls—one pink and the other blue—and was made available for purchase on Swift's online store exclusively. Billboard reported that a total of 13,000 copies of the album were available for purchase in the United States.

The album was reissued on January 7, 2025, on Swift's online store as a 72-hour limited edition, containing new pressings of the two heart-shaped vinyls. The re-release sold out in less than an hour. On January 16, 2025, the standard edition and three deluxe editions of the album were made available for digital download through Swift's online store for six hours. The three deluxe editions each contained one live bonus track of a song from Lover performed during the Eras Tour (2023–2024): "False God", "I Think He Knows", or "Paper Rings".

== Reception ==
Lover (Live from Paris) was the best-selling vinyl album in the United States for the chart week dated March 4, 2023. It topped the Billboard Vinyl Albums chart as Swift's ninth number-one album on the chart, landed at number five on the Top Album Sales chart by selling 13,000 copies, and debuted at number 58 on the overall Billboard 200. Alongside the live album's entry on the Billboard 200 chart dated March 4, 2023, Swift charted nine other albums, (Note: Midnights (2022) – number three, Folklore (2020) – number 28, Lover (2019) – number 41, 1989 (2014) – number 50, Red (Taylor's Version) (2021) – number 56, Reputation (2017) – number 100, Evermore (2020) – number 103, Fearless (Taylor's Version) (2021) – number 172 and Speak Now (2010) – number 192.) becoming the first artist to place at least 10 albums on the Billboard 200 simultaneously since Prince in 2016; she also became the first living soloist to chart 10 albums in a single week since 1963.

Following its vinyl reissue and digital release in 2025, the album re-entered the Billboard 200 at number two, behind Bad Bunny's Debí Tirar Más Fotos, with 202,500 album-equivalent units, all from album sales, of which 161,000 were vinyl sales. It marked the largest vinyl sales week for a live album since Luminate started tracking in 1991, and Swift's 18th top-ten album on the chart. It also topped the Top Album Sales chart as Swift's 15th number-one album, surpassing Jay-Z as the artist with the most number-one albums on that chart. The album sold 206,000 pure copies (digital and physical) in the first half of 2025 in the United States. Lover (Live from Paris) also topped the UK Albums Chart and became Swift's 13th number-one album in the United Kingdom, surpassing Madonna as the female artist with the most number-one albums in the country.

Publications have described Lover (Live from Paris) as a rare, collectable album. Variety dubbed it as Swift's "rarest vinyl", treated by fans as a "fetish item". The magazine reported that the album's original vinyls were regularly sold on eBay for over US$1,000. ComingSoon.net described it as a "highly sought-after collector's item". ClutchPoints said, "it may be the rarest entry in her discography to get on vinyl".

== Track listing ==
All tracks are produced by Taylor Swift and subtitled "(Live from Paris)".

Side A

1. "Me!" (Taylor Swift, Joel Little, Brendon Urie) – 3:33
2. "The Archer" (Swift, Jack Antonoff) – 3:30

Side B

3. "Death by a Thousand Cuts" (Swift, Antonoff) – 3:19
4. "Cornelia Street" (Swift) – 4:56

Side C

5. "The Man" (Swift, Little) – 3:39
6. "Daylight" (Swift) – 4:22

Side D

7. "You Need to Calm Down" (Swift, Little) – 3:23
8. "Lover" (Swift) – 3:49

== Personnel ==
- Taylor Swift – vocals, production, songwriting, piano, guitar
- Max Bernstein – guitar, acoustic guitar, keyboard
- Mike Meadows – acoustic guitar, keyboard
- Paul Sidoti – guitar, acoustic guitar
- Amos Heller – bass, keyboard
- Eliotte Woodford – background vocals
- Jeslyn Gorman – background vocals
- Kamilah Marshall – background vocals
- Melanie Nyema – background vocals
- Matt Billingslea – drums
- David Cook – keyboard
- Jack Antonoff – songwriting
- Joel Little – songwriting
- Brendon Urie – songwriting
- Christopher Rowe – mastering, mixing, engineering

== Charts ==
2023 chart performance for Lover (Live from Paris)
Chart (2023)	Peak position
Australian Vinyl Albums (ARIA)	6
Scottish Albums (Official Charts)	9
UK Albums (Official Charts)	90
US Billboard 200	58

2025 chart performance for Lover (Live from Paris)
Chart (2025)	Peak position
Australian Albums (ARIA)	14
Canadian Albums (Billboard)	39
Irish Albums (Official Charts)	2
Scottish Albums (Official Charts)	1
UK Albums (Official Charts)	1
US Billboard 200	2

== Release history ==
Release dates and formats for Lover (Live from Paris)
Release date	Edition(s)	Format(s)	Label	Ref.
February 14, 2023	Standard	Vinyl record	Republic	
January 7, 2025	Standard	Vinyl record (reissue)	Republic	
January 16, 2025	Standard; deluxe (Note: Three deluxe editions each containing a live bonus track of a song from Lover performed during the Eras Tour.: Lover (Live from Paris) + Bonus Track "False God" (Live from The Eras Tour); Lover (Live from Paris) + Bonus Track "I Think He Knows" (Live from The Eras Tour); Lover (Live from Paris) + Bonus Track "Paper Rings" (Live from The Eras Tour))	Digital download (Note: Exclusive to the United States region.)	Republic	
