= Paper Rings =

2019 song by Taylor Swift

Song by Taylor Swift

from the album Lover
- Released: August 23, 2019
- Studio: Electric Lady (New York); Metropolis (London)
- Genre: Pop-punk; bubblegum; new wave; power pop; rockabilly; surf pop
- Length: 3:42
- Label: Republic
- Songwriters: Taylor Swift; Jack Antonoff
- Producers: Taylor Swift; Jack Antonoff

Audio video
- "Paper Rings" on YouTube

"Paper Rings" is a song by the American singer-songwriter Taylor Swift from her seventh studio album, Lover (2019). Written and produced by Swift and Jack Antonoff, it is a rock-influenced song combining retro musical styles of pop and rock such as pop-punk, bubblegum, and new wave. Its production incorporates tambourine jingles, electric guitars, and girl-group-inspired vocals. The lyrics address a romantic confession that disregards materialistic concerns; Swift's character tells her love that she would marry him with paper rings despite her love for "shiny things".

Critics praised the catchy and lively composition and lighthearted theme and found it fitting for the album, but a few deemed the track underwhelming. "Paper Rings" charted in Australia, Canada, Scotland, Singapore, and the United States, and it received certifications in Australia and the United Kingdom. Swift performed "Paper Rings" as a "surprise song" outside the regular setlist at the Eras Tour concert in Minneapolis on June 23, 2023.

== Background and release ==
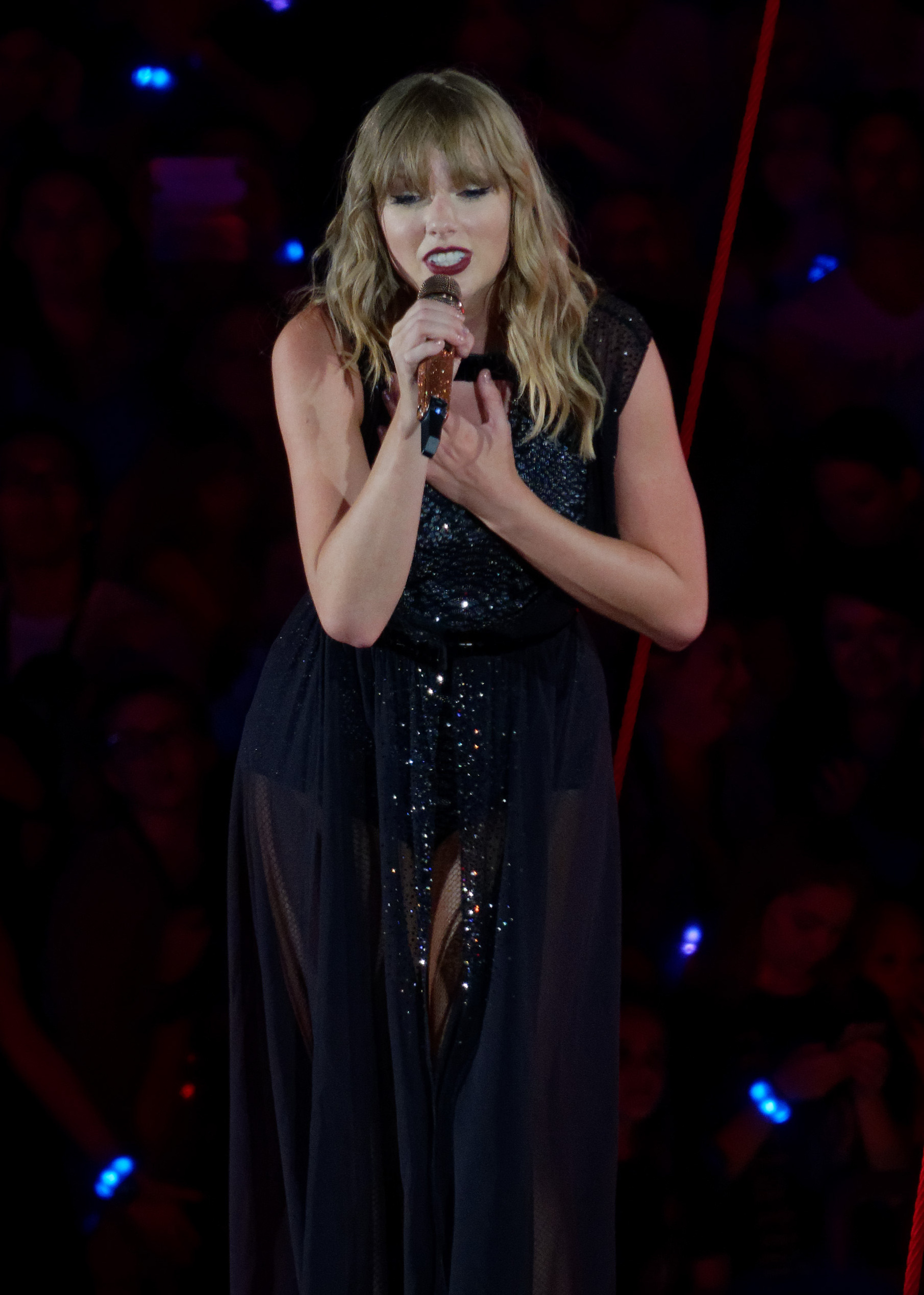
Taylor Swift performing on the Reputation Stadium Tour (2018)

Taylor Swift conceived her seventh studio album, Lover, as a "love letter to love" itself that explores the many feelings evoked by love. The album was influenced by the connections she felt with her fans on her Reputation Stadium Tour (2018), which helped her recalibrate her personal life and artistic direction after the media controversies surrounding her celebrity at the time. Republic Records released Lover on August 23, 2019. It was Swift's first album under Republic after she ended her previous contract with Big Machine Records. Lover consists of 18 tracks, and "Paper Rings" is track number eight.

The song peaked at number 45 on the US Billboard Hot 100, number 40 on the Canadian Hot 100, and number 96 on the Scottish Singles Chart. The track peaked at number 29 on Australia's ARIA Singles Chart and was certified double platinum by the Australian Recording Industry Association. In the United Kingdom, "Paper Rings" reached number 53 on the Official Audio Streaming Chart and was certified gold by the British Phonographic Industry. On June 23, 2023, at a Minneapolis show of her Eras Tour, Swift sang a guitar solo version of "Paper Rings" as a "surprise song". On January 16, 2025, a deluxe edition of Lover (Live from Paris) was made available for digital download through Swift's online store for six hours containing this live recording as a bonus track.

== Production and lyrics ==
"Paper Rings" is 3 minutes and 42 seconds long. Swift wrote and produced the track with Jack Antonoff, and both of them played percussions. Antonoff provided background vocals and programmed and played the keyboard, guitars (acoustic, bass, electric), drums, and piano. He and Laura Sisk, assisted by Nick Mills and Jon Sher, recorded the song at Electric Lady Studios in New York City and Metropolis Studios in London. John Hanes engineered the track for mixing, which was done by Serban Ghenea at MixStar Studios, Virginia Beach, Virginia. Randy Merrill mastered the track at Sterling Sound in New York City.

"Paper Rings"
"Paper Rings" has a retro production combining pop and rock styles such as pop-punk, bubblegum, and new wave over jangly guitars.

Swift wrote "Paper Rings" imagining herself "at a wedding band at a reception, playing the love songs that the bride and groom wanted to hear in, like, 1978 or something". "Paper Rings" is a rock-influenced tune combining various retro musical styles with a modern touch, such as pop-punk, bubblegum, new wave, power pop, rockabilly, and surf pop. The production consists of tambourine jingles and electric guitars. The track incorporates a brief guitar solo and old-school shouting background vocals, inspired by the way punk girl groups would sing in their records. The Independent's Roisin O'Connor described Swift's vocals as "muffled and tinny", which lent the track an "old-school" feel. Towards the end, at the bridge, the composition includes a key change. Time's Dana Schwartz thought the song had a "jangly" sound that recalled country music, while Glenn Rowley of Consequence wrote that the production evoked ska. Some critics compared "Paper Rings" to the music by the Go-Go's and Avril Lavigne.

In the lyrics, Swift sings about wanting to commit to a long-term lover. Swift explained on the theme as "just basically reminiscing on fun memories". She elaborated on the chorus ("I like shiny things but I'd marry you with paper rings"): "it talks about how [...] your whole life you talk with your friends about how, [...] 'Oh my God. Do you wanna get married? What do you want your ring to look like? What kind of ring do you want?' I don't know, I just feel like if you really love someone, love someone, you'd be like, 'I don't care.'" The romance in the song started in the winter and the narrator obsesses over her lover, stalking him on social media and detailing the books that he likes. The two engage in a "cat-and-mouse" phase before Swift's character declares her commitment, telling her lover that she wants his "dreary Mondays" and "complications". Emily Yahr of The Washington Post and Raisa Bruner of Time thought that these details are reminiscent of Swift's song "New Year's Day" (2017), in which Swift sings, "I want your midnights." Before the refrain, Antonoff counts, "1, 2, 3, 4." Swift finishes her lines with "uh-huh"s and "that's right"s and insists, "Darling, you're the one I want."

== Critical reception ==
Critics praised "Paper Rings" for its upbeat and lively production. Uproxx's Caitlin White hailed "Paper Rings" as a "near-perfect pop song", and Schwartz described the track as a "bright, jangly standout". Jon Caramanica of The New York Times wrote that "[Lover's] power is encapsulated on 'Paper Rings' and 'Cornelia Street'"; he said that the former track is "[bubbly] and wise" and "[vibrates] with almost a nervous energy". Lindsay Zoladz of The Ringer deemed "Paper Rings" one of the album's defining songs because it "allows [Swift] to sound giddily, unfashionably ecstatic". In Spin, Jordan Sargent picked the track as an example of Swift and Antonoff's production chemistry, praising its power-pop arrangement for "giving Swift's sneer the stomping support it deserves". Variety's Chris Willman deemed it one of Lover's two most lighthearted and "irresistible bangers", alongside "I Think He Knows". Ben Rayner of the Toronto Star said "Paper Rings" had an "instant infectiousness" and described the track as a "deftly executed little love song". Jason Lipshutz from Billboard wrote that its "happy-go-lucky bubblegum vibe" and "showy hook" would make it "an absolute blast" if Swift performed it on a tour.

Many critics also complimented the lyricism. Ludovic Hunter-Tilney from the Financial Times thought that "Paper Rings" both "[verges] on kitsch" and displays Swift's "sense of playfulness" and attention to lyrical details. In The Music, Keira Leonard said that the lyric, "I like shiny things but I'd marry you with paper rings", encapsulated Swift's honest and authentic songwriting about "that feeling perfectly of forgetting everything you ever thought you wanted in a person/relationship when you meet that special someone". Leonard and Rob Sheffield of Rolling Stone picked the lyric, "I hate accidents except when we went from friends to this", as their favorite off the track. Esquire's Dave Holmes hailed "Paper Rings" as one of Swift's "strongest, simplest songs in ages" and its "purely joyful" sentiment. Mikael Wood of the Los Angeles Times ranked "Paper Rings" the fifth best song out of Lover's 18 tracks; he said that it was "[as] peppy as 'Me!'" but "incalculably smarter", with a happy-ending theme reminiscent of Swift's early songs like "Love Story" (2008).

In less enthusiastic reviews, Anna Gaca of Pitchfork described the track as "cute, and then exhausting", and Sam Brooks of The Spinoff complained that the guitar solo was "neither long enough to justify its place, or short enough to justify even being called a solo proper". Alexis Petridis of The Guardian called "Paper Rings" a "new wave-y misfire" for its "lightweight" production. The Atlantic's Spencer Kornharber picked the song as one of the album's weakest tracks and dismissed it as a "corny sock hop". Kitty Empire in The Observer said that the track "[flirts] hard, but perhaps not quite as hard as 1989's magisterial 'Blank Space' did".

== Personnel ==
Credits adapted from the liner notes of Lover

- Taylor Swift – lead vocals, songwriter, producer, percussion
- Jack Antonoff – producer, recording, programming, percussion, acoustic guitar, bass guitar, drums, electric guitar, keyboard, piano, background vocals
- Serban Ghenea – mixing
- John Hanes – engineered for mix
- Nick Mills – assistant recording
- Jon Sher – assistant recording
- Laura Sisk – recording

== Charts ==
Chart performance for "Paper Rings"
Chart (2019)	Peak position
Australia (ARIA)	29
Canada Hot 100 (Billboard)	40
New Zealand Hot Singles (RMNZ)	4
Scottish Singles Sales (Official Charts)	96
Singapore (RIAS)	24
UK Audio Streaming (Official Charts)	53
US Billboard Hot 100	45

== Certifications ==
Certifications for "Paper Rings"
Region	Certification	Certified units/sales
Australia (ARIA)	2× Platinum	140,000^{‡}
Brazil (Pro-Música Brasil)	2× Platinum	80,000^{‡}
New Zealand (RMNZ)	Platinum	30,000^{‡}
Spain (Promusicae)	Gold	30,000^{‡}
United Kingdom (BPI)	Platinum	600,000^{‡}
^{‡} Sales+streaming figures based on certification alone.
