= Daylight (Taylor Swift song) =

2019 song by Taylor Swift

- "Live from Paris" cover art

Song by Taylor Swift

from the album Lover
- Released: August 23, 2019
- Studio: Electric Lady (New York); Metropolis (London)
- Genre: Synth-pop
- Length: 4:53
- Label: Republic
- Songwriter: Taylor Swift
- Producers: Taylor Swift; Jack Antonoff

Audio video
- "Daylight" on YouTube

"Daylight" is a song written and recorded by the American singer-songwriter Taylor Swift for her seventh studio album, Lover (2019). A synth-pop ballad produced by her and Jack Antonoff, it has a maximalist production incorporating soft, steady beats and fluttering keyboards that build up with increasing intensity. Intended by Swift to be the title track of Lover, "Daylight" represents her evolved perception on love and romance: in the lyrics, she describes love as "golden like daylight" and not "burning red" like she once believed.

Music critics generally acclaimed the vulnerability and maturity portrayed in "Daylight" but gave mixed opinions on its production; some reviews picked the track as an album highlight. Commercially, the song charted in Australia, Canada, and the US; and it received certifications in Australia, Brazil, New Zealand, and the UK. Swift performed "Daylight" live at the one-off City of Lover concert on September 9, 2019, and four times on the Eras Tour in 2023 and 2024.

== Background and composition ==
Taylor Swift conceived her seventh studio album, Lover, as a "love letter to love itself" that explores the emotional spectrum evoked by love, inspired by her realization of love that felt "very real". Swift wrote "Daylight" for Lover by herself and produced the song with Jack Antonoff, who programmed it and played the electric guitar, keyboards, and piano. Antonoff and Laura Sisk, assisted by Nick Mills and John Rooney, recorded the track at Electric Lady Studios in New York City and Metropolis Studios in London. The song was mixed by Serban Ghenea, assisted by John Hanes, at MixStar Studios in Virginia Beach.

"Daylight" is a synth-pop ballad that is driven by soft, steady beats generated with a drum machine and fluttering keyboards that build up with increasing intensity. Billboard's Jason Lipshutz described the sound as "maximalist pop", while Time's Raisa Bruner wrote that the song slowly builds up towards a big sound. Swift intended "Daylight" to be the album's title track, but she later decided on "Lover" instead because she thought it was not "too on-the-nose". In a Lover secret album-listening session with iHeartRadio, Swift said that "Daylight" represented her newfound mindset after her 2017 album Reputation, which for her was conceived during her worst time. Looking back on her Reputation days, she realized she could still find love and friendship despite the chaotic outer world, which she channeled into writing "Daylight".

The lyrics of "Daylight" reference Swift's 2012 song "Red" to explore her newfound wisdom on the transformative power of love that is "golden like daylight" and not "burning red" like she once believed after having woken up from 20 years of dark night. It closes with Swift's spoken epilogue about her realization of a sustainable love, affirming that one should define themselves by the things they love, not the things they hate or are afraid of. Many critics deemed the song's message an appropriate statement for Swift's new era, after the bitterness and anger depicted in Reputation.

== Release and live performances ==
Lover was released via Republic Records on August 23, 2019; "Daylight" is track number 18 and the closing track. Upon release of Lover, "Daylight" peaked at number 70 on the ARIA Singles Chart in Australia, number 87 on the Canadian Hot 100, and number 89 on the US Billboard Hot 100. The song has been certified platinum in Australia, Brazil, and New Zealand, and silver in the United Kingdom.

Swift performed an acoustic version of "Daylight" on a grand piano at the one-off concert City of Lover at the Olympia in Paris, France, on September 9, 2019. The performance was recorded and aired as part of a live special on American Broadcasting Company (ABC) on May 17, 2020, and was made available on music streaming services the following day. It was later released as part of the live album Lover (Live from Paris) in 2023.

Swift performed "Daylight" live four times on the Eras Tour. On June 24, 2023, she sang it on piano at the Minneapolis concert, after having learned about a fan asking her on Twitter to perform it in honor of her late brother. In 2024, she performed "Daylight" as part of mashups with her other songs on three stops: with "Come Back... Be Here" in Melbourne, Australia, on February 18; with "'Tis the Damn Season" in Edinburgh, Scotland, on June 7; and with "This Is Me Trying" in Miami, Florida, on October 18.

== Critical reception ==
Lipshutz ranked it the best track on Lover, describing it as a "grand finale" that encapsulates the message of the album and a successful embrace of Swift's "maximalist pop" sound. Annie Zaleski of The A.V. Club described the song as "swooning" and insightful into Swift's personal growth, and Spencer Kornhaber of The Atlantic lauded the bridge as wonderful. The Face's Ilana Kaplan was impressed by the maturity depicted in "Daylight" that showcased Swift as carefree and more lighthearted, and further complimented its "dreamy haze". Billboard ranked the track among the best 100 songs by Swift: "No song on Lover evokes the candy-colored clouds behind Swift's head on the album cover quite like this one."

There were mixed reviews, mostly on the production. Mikael Wood of the Los Angeles Times considered the production pretty but said that it "never quite lifts off in the way it seems to want to", while Paste dubbed the drum sounds "uninspired", and PopMatters's Deborah Krieger wrote that the song failed to generate significant interest. Nate Jones of Vulture wrote that the track was derivative of Swift's "Clean" (2014) in terms of lyrics, and Beyoncé's "Halo" (2009) in terms of production, but he enjoyed the spoken-word outro. Avery Stone of Vice considered the theme of "Daylight" uplifting but contended that Swift did not need a man to feel complete. In Variety, Chris Willman wrote that the song was not as memorable as Swift's previous album closers like "Clean" or "New Year's Day" (2017), but he lauded the live version at Paris as outshining the original album production.

== Personnel ==
Credits adapted from the liner notes of Lover

- Taylor Swift – writer, producer, lead vocals
- Jack Antonoff – producer, recording, programming, electric guitar, keyboards, piano
- Laura Sisk – recording
- Nick Mills – assistant recording engineer
- John Rooney – assistant recording engineer
- Serban Ghenea – mixing
- John Hanes – mix engineering

== Charts ==
Chart performance for "Daylight"
Chart (2019)	Peak position
Australia (ARIA)	70
Canada Hot 100 (Billboard)	87
US Billboard Hot 100	89

== Certifications ==
Certifications for "Daylight"
Region	Certification	Certified units/sales
Australia (ARIA)	Platinum	70,000^{‡}
Brazil (Pro-Música Brasil)	Platinum	40,000^{‡}
New Zealand (RMNZ)	Platinum	30,000^{‡}
United Kingdom (BPI)	Silver	200,000^{‡}
^{‡} Sales+streaming figures based on certification alone.
