= City of Lover =

2019 concert by Taylor Swift

- One-off concert by Taylor Swift
- Poster for the ABC TV special
- Location: Olympia; Paris, France
- Associated album: Lover
- Date: September 9, 2019
- Duration: 60 minutes (concert); 42 minutes (TV broadcast)
- No. of shows: 1
- Attendance: 2,000

City of Lover was a one-off concert by the American singer-songwriter Taylor Swift, held at the Olympia in Paris, France, on September 9, 2019. It happened slightly over two weeks after the release of Swift's seventh studio album, Lover (2019).

The concert was reserved for fans who had won tickets through online contests or album purchases. The set list consisted of 16 songs, with eight from Lover and eight from Swift's other albums. City of Lover ran for one hour, and was the only concert that Swift held to promote Lover, after the planned concert tour for the album was canceled due to the COVID-19 pandemic. On May 17, 2020, a television special titled Taylor Swift: City of Lover, filmed at the concert, was broadcast on ABC in the United States. Compared to the original concert, the TV special only included the eight Lover tracks and ran for 42 minutes, including commercials.

City of Lover and its corresponding TV special received positive reviews from media publications, who lauded Swift's stage presence and intimate engagement with fans. However, a few critics complained that the TV special should have included the whole sixteen-song set list instead of just the eight Lover songs. Some publications noted that Swift's concert at the Olympia—a venue with a 2,000-seat capacity—was a rare move for her after her 2018 Reputation Stadium Tour, which sold-out venues with much higher capacities. The TV special was made available on Hulu and Disney+ for a few weeks beginning on May 16, 2020. The broadcast performances were released individually to streaming services the following day and later compiled into a live album, titled Lover (Live from Paris), released on Valentine's Day in 2023.

== Background ==
The American singer-songwriter Taylor Swift released her seventh studio album, Lover, on August 23, 2019, through Republic Records. Described by Swift as a "love letter to love itself", Lover explores the "full spectrum of love", inspired by the connections with fans during Swift's Reputation Stadium Tour (2018). The album received positive reviews from critics, who complimented Swift's songwriting for showcasing her maturity as an artist. It enjoyed commercial success, peaking atop the albums chart in countries including Australia, Canada, Ireland, the Netherlands, Portugal, Spain, the United Kingdom, and the United States, and was the world's best-selling album by a solo artist of 2019.

To celebrate the album's release, Swift held the City of Lover, a one-off concert, at the Olympia music hall in Paris, France, on September 9, 2019. Prior to the event, tickets were not available for the public, but were reserved to fans who had bought the album to enter online contests from a select 37 countries around the world. Due to the event's secrecy among selected fans, there were no extensive promotional campaigns for it. City of Lover was the only concert Swift held at a music hall to accompany Lover, after the planned Lover Fest concert tour was canceled due to the COVID-19 pandemic.

City of Lover marked Swift's first concert at a music hall in France since her 2011 Speak Now World Tour. She had also held a small performance on a boat by the Seine in 2013 to perform songs from Red. Before, Swift had not had attained commercial success in France to the same extent as in the United States or East Asia—during its first week of release, Lover sold 7,500 copies in France first-week, compared to one million units in China or nearly 700,000 copies in the United States. Swift told Le Parisien in a May 2019 interview that she deemed it a "priority" to hold a concert again in France after eight years.

== Concert synopsis ==
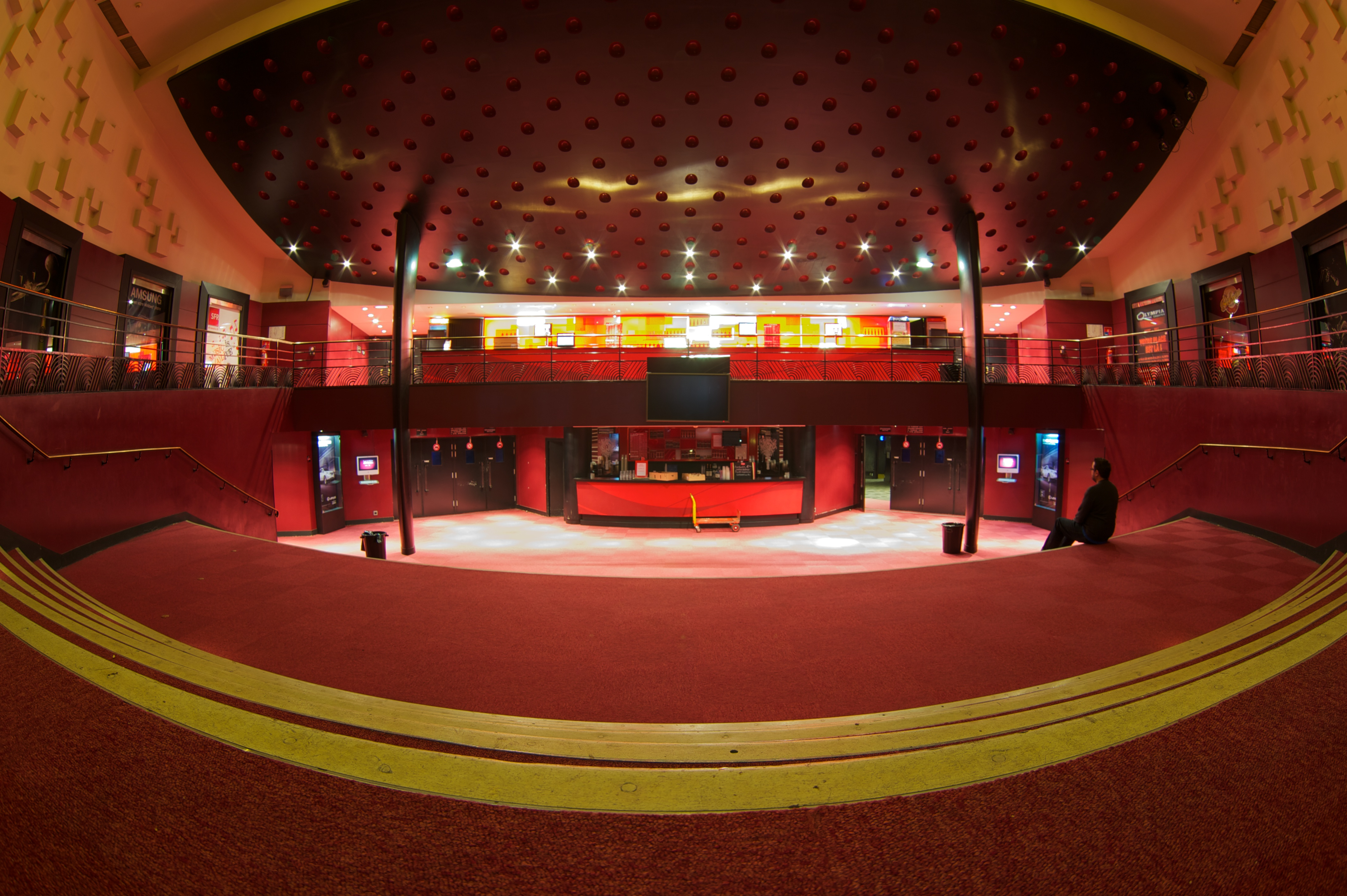
The concert was held at the Olympia in Paris (interior pictured).

The title of the concert plays on the nickname of Paris as the "City of Love". There were a total of approximately 2,000 attendees, all of whom had won tickets to the concert through online contests or album purchases. The concert's set list is primarily made up of songs from Lover, including the singles "Me!", "You Need to Calm Down", "Lover", "The Man", and the album tracks "The Archer", "Death by a Thousand Cuts", "Cornelia Street", and "Daylight". Concertgoers were given LED-illuminated wristbands that flickered and flashed in sync with each song Swift played.

After opening the concert with "Me!", Swift greeted the crowd in French, "Bonsoir Paris! Je suis Taylor, enchantée!" before switching to English. She then sang "Blank Space" (from her 2014 album 1989) and "I Knew You Were Trouble" (from her 2012 album Red). She proceeded with "The Archer", over dense synth reverberation, before performing two songs from her back catalog—"Love Story" (from her 2008 album Fearless) and "Delicate" (from her 2017 album Reputation). After "Delicate", Swift explained to the audience about her songwriting process and introduced them to an "acoustic session" which featured songs she performed on an acoustic guitar and a piano: "With this album, everything I wrote, I wrote it with one instrument. I wrote with my guitar or with my piano, so I thought to myself that I wanted to try them out for you. sing the same way tonight, live, because this is my first time playing them in front of you."

During the six-song acoustic session, Swift performed stripped-down versions of "Death by a Thousand Cuts", "Cornelia Street", and "The Man". In-between each song, Swift shared with the audience her songwriting inspiration and context. She then performed two songs from Red—"Red" and "All Too Well"—on a grand piano. She followed with "Daylight" before embracing a more upbeat sound for "Style" (from 1989). Two songs from Lover—"You Need to Calm Down" and "Lover"—followed, before the concert wrapped with "Shake It Off"—the lead single from 1989. The City of Lover concert ended without an encore.

== Video and music releases ==
City of Lover
- Genre: Concert film
- Directed by: Dan Massie
- Starring: Taylor Swift
- Country of origin: United States
- Original language: English

Production
- Executive producers: Robert Allen; Tom Land; Andrea Swift; Taylor Swift
- Producer: Mike Downs
- Production location: Paris, France
- Cinematography: Ben Coughlan
- Editor: Laura Randolph
- Production companies: Electric Light Studios; Taylor Swift Productions

Original release
- Network: ABC
- Release: May 17, 2020

On May 17, 2020, the concert was aired as a one-hour special, titled Taylor Swift: City of Lover, on ABC. The following day, it was made available for on-demand streaming on Hulu and Disney+. Media publications opined that the release was due to the COVID-19 pandemic, which led to Swift's planned Lover Fest tour to support Lover being postponed and ultimately canceled. While the actual concert consisted of 16 songs and ran for an hour, the TV special only included the eight songs from Lover, and ran for 42 minutes (including commercials).

The ABC premiere attracted 3.63 million viewers, which The Hollywood Reporter described as "so-so numbers". Following the ABC premiere, live versions of the Lover songs were released to digital music and streaming platforms, except "The Man", which had been previously released on February 18, 2020. Swift released a set of two heart-shaped records of the live Lover songs for Valentine's Day in 2023, titled Lover (Live from Paris).

=== Cast ===
- Taylor Swift, vocalist
- Max Bernstein, guitarist and keyboardist
- Matt Billingslea, drummer
- David Cook, keyboardist
- Jeslyn Gorman, background vocalist
- Amos Heller, bassist
- Kamilah Marshall, background vocalist
- Mike Meadows, guitarist and keyboardist
- Melanie Nyema, background vocalist
- Paul Sidoti, guitarist
- Eliotte Woodford, background vocalist

== Reception ==
Upon completion, City of Lover received positive feedback from the European press. Most critics were particularly fond of the acoustic session, which showcased Swift's songwriting crafts and intimate connections with the audience. The French webzine Melty deemed it a "memorable night". Reviews from the British publications NME, the i, and The Times all gave the concert five-star ratings. Hannah Mylrea from NME Swift's stage presence, vocals during the acoustic numbers, and intimate interaction with the audience. Sarah Carson from the i deemed Swift a "confident and commanding performer" with a more laid-back and self-asserted attitude. Carson appreciated Swift's decision to play at the 2,000-seat Olympia rather than stadiums as on her previous world tour, Reputation Stadium Tour (2018), which fostered an intimate setting with fans. Will Hodgkinson of The Times applauded Swift for "appearing unguarded while remaining entirely professional, and it drew you towards her". In an article for the French magazine Les Inrockuptibles, Ahlem Khattab noted that Swift had had limited commercial success in France, because she prioritized the English-speaking countries and East Asia. Through the City of Lover concert, Swift proved herself to be a capable musician and performer, which could possibly pave a path to French success. Le Monde journalist Stéphane Davet was otherwise skeptical about whether City of Lover could turn Swift into a pop star in France, but concluded that it "doesn't matter".

The ABC TV special received positive reviews in the American press, although some critics felt that the 42-minute run was too short. Chris Willman of Variety lauded Swift's storytelling abilities through both her songs and her conversations regarding behind-the-scene conception of her music. He also praised Swift's simplistic appearance in a black dress and black boots and the minimal lighting, which fostered an intimate setting. In The Philadelphia Inquirer, Dan DeLuca considered the concert to be a showcase of Swift's "gift for marrying personal stories to undeniable pop hooks", but felt that the 42-minute run was not successful in promoting Lover—a "not-so-new-anymore album"—and the TV special should have included the whole set list. In a 2021 article commemorating Lover's second anniversary, USA Today deemed "Cornelia Street" a highlight on City of Lover: "Something about this version's raw energy and Swift's connection to her audience breaks our heart a 'Lover Fest' tour never happened."

== Set list ==
This is the set list for the City of Lover concert. The songs that featured on the ABC TV special are marked with a dagger (†).

1. "Me!" †
2. "Blank Space"
3. "I Knew You Were Trouble"
4. "The Archer" †
5. "Love Story"
6. "Delicate"
7. "Death by a Thousand Cuts" †
8. "Cornelia Street" †
9. "The Man" †
10. "All Too Well"
11. "Red"
12. "Daylight" †
13. "Style"
14. "You Need to Calm Down" †
15. "Lover" †
16. "Shake It Off"
