= The Man (Taylor Swift song) =

2020 single by Taylor Swift

- Live version cover

Single by Taylor Swift

from the album Lover
- Released: January 27, 2020
- Studio: Electric Lady (New York City); Golden Age West (Auckland, New Zealand)
- Genre: Synth-pop; electropop
- Length: 3:10
- Label: Republic
- Songwriters: Taylor Swift; Joel Little
- Producers: Taylor Swift; Joel Little

Taylor Swift singles chronology
"Christmas Tree Farm" (2019)	"The Man" (2020)	"Cardigan" (2020)

Music video
- "The Man" on YouTube

"The Man" is a song by the American singer-songwriter Taylor Swift from her seventh studio album, Lover (2019). Swift wrote and produced the song with Joel Little. "The Man" is an uptempo synth-pop and electropop song with flashy harmonies, murky synths, and rumbling beats. In the lyrics, Swift imagines how she would be treated if she were a man. The song received a positive reception from critics, who praised its feminist message for the greater good.

The track peaked at number 23 on the US Billboard Hot 100 upon the album's release, and entered the top-forty in Australia, Belgium, Canada, Czech Republic, Estonia, Hungary, Ireland, Malaysia, New Zealand, Norway, Singapore, Slovakia, and the United Kingdom. It impacted US adult contemporary and pop radio formats on January 27 and 28, 2020, as the fourth single from the album. On February 18, 2020, a live acoustic version of the song, titled "The Man (Live from Paris)", was released on all music platforms, accompanied by its live video.

An official music video for "The Man" was released on February 27, 2020, directed by Taylor Swift herself, marking her solo directorial debut. The satirical video sees Swift in her theoretical male alter-ego named "Tyler Swift", voiced by Dwayne Johnson, presenting several prevalent examples of sexist double standards in society, including objectification, sexualization of women, toxic masculinity, and patriarchy. The video received critical acclaim for its concept and Swift's transformation into a man. It was nominated for the Video of the Year, Video for Good, and Best Direction at the 2020 MTV Video Music Awards, winning the latter, making Swift the first solo female director in VMA history to win the category.

== Background and composition ==
We [women] have to curate and cater everything, but we have to make it look like an accident. Because if we make a mistake, that's our fault, but if we strategize so that we won't make a mistake, we're calculating. There is a bit of a damned-if-we-do, damned-if-we-don't thing happening in music.

— Swift on what inspired "The Man", Billboard

The recording process for Taylor Swift's seventh studio album Lover took under three months and concluded in February 2019. Joel Little was revealed as one of the producers for the album with the release of the lead single "Me!" in April. He co-wrote and co-produced four of the eighteen tracks for the album. The song title was revealed along with the lyrics "I'd be a fearless leader / I'd be an alpha type / When everyone believes ya— / What's that like?" in Swift's Vogue cover interview for the September 2019 issue.

"The Man" is a synth-pop and electropop song that features flashy harmonies and a murky synthesizer. Swift imagines society's treatment of her if she were a man, over an uptempo production. Swift challenges societal sexist double standards, with lyrics including a reference to American actor Leonardo DiCaprio. Swift uses the actor as an example to explain sexism, singing "And they would toast to me, oh, let the players play/I'd be just like Leo in Saint-Tropez". In outtakes from an interview with Billboard in December 2019, Swift said she wrote the song not only from personal experience, but also from hearing the general experiences of women working across all parts of the music industry.

According to Billboard's Gil Kaufman, "The Man" is a pointed statement about "how much harder women need to work than men to get to the same finish line". Jason Lipshutz of the same magazine described the song as a "biting look at gender dynamics within both the pop industry and celebrity-driven culture", noting that it is sonically composed of a rumbling beat and crackling synths and lyrically provides wry humor and an honest perspective. An animated lyric video for "The Man" was released on February 7, 2020.

== Critical reception ==
"The Man" received acclaim from music critics. The Atlantic's Spencer Kornhaber described "The Man" as "one of the most straightforwardly catchy songs" on Lover, and further called it Swift's "most explicit musical statement on sexism". He opined that the Leonardo DiCaprio reference is the "most memorable" line of the song. Brittany Hodak of Forbes praised the song as "the most important song she's [Swift has] ever written". She also stated that the song is "a brilliant portrayal of the subtle and not-so-subtle sexism women face every day". Time's Raisa Bruner labeled the song as "a bombastic, empowering bop" that is "an anthem for anyone who's felt blocked by sexist double standards". Comparing the song to Swift's 2017 album, Rob Sheffield of Rolling Stone described "The Man" as "a righteous feminist bombshell Reputation could have used". Slate's Carl Wilson opined that the song "widens the lens and makes a more convincing case for her [Swift's] grievances than on any beefing track she's ever written". He further described the song as a "synth-strut mode very reminiscent of Haim" that "takes aim at sexist music industry and media double standards and just keeps firing bull's-eyes".

Writing for Elite Daily, Sade Spence and Kristen Perrone stated that the lyrics of the song are "super bold and carry a powerful message about women". They further stated that the song is an addition to the "legendary canon of crafty takes on sexism" in music. Allie Gemmill of Teen Vogue stated that the song "gives women permission to keep challenging sexist double standards, and fans are here for it", adding that the "fierce" song includes "many incredibly good lyrics". Writing for Billboard, Jason Lipshutz called it "a complete jam" and ranked it as the 12th best track on the album, and further expanded that it "will draw attention for its searing subject matter, but it's also one of Lover's most complete productions". The same magazine's Gab Ginsberg opined that "The Man" is "catchy-as-all-heck". Writing for The New York Times, Jon Caramanica described the song as "excellent and pointed". Jordan Sargent of Spin negatively compared the song to "You Need to Calm Down", stating that the lyric "If I was a man, then I'd be the man" doesn't really offer much insight.

== Release and commercial performance ==
On August 16, 2019, Swift announced the track listing of her seventh studio album, Lover, where "The Man" was unveiled. One week later, the project was released, with "The Man" serving as the fourth track. Next year, the song was serviced to the US adult contemporary and pop radio formats on January 27 and 28, 2020, as the fourth single from Lover. The following month, the track was issued by Universal Music Group to Italian radio airplay on February 14, whilst the live version was made available to digital download and streaming worldwide four days later.

In the United States, following the release of its parent album Lover, "The Man" debuted at number four on the Billboard Streaming Songs chart, number 23 on the Billboard Hot 100, and number 32 on the Billboard Digital Song Sales chart, all dated September 7, 2019. The song peaked at number 20 and 10 on Billboard Pop Songs and Billboard Adult Pop Songs charts. In Europe, "The Man" charted at number 16 in Ireland, 62 in the Netherlands, 24 in Norway, 82 in Scotland, 63 in Sweden and 80 in Switzerland. It reached number 21 on the UK Singles Chart. It was also commercially successful in Oceania, peaking at number 17 in Australia and 15 in New Zealand.

== Music video ==
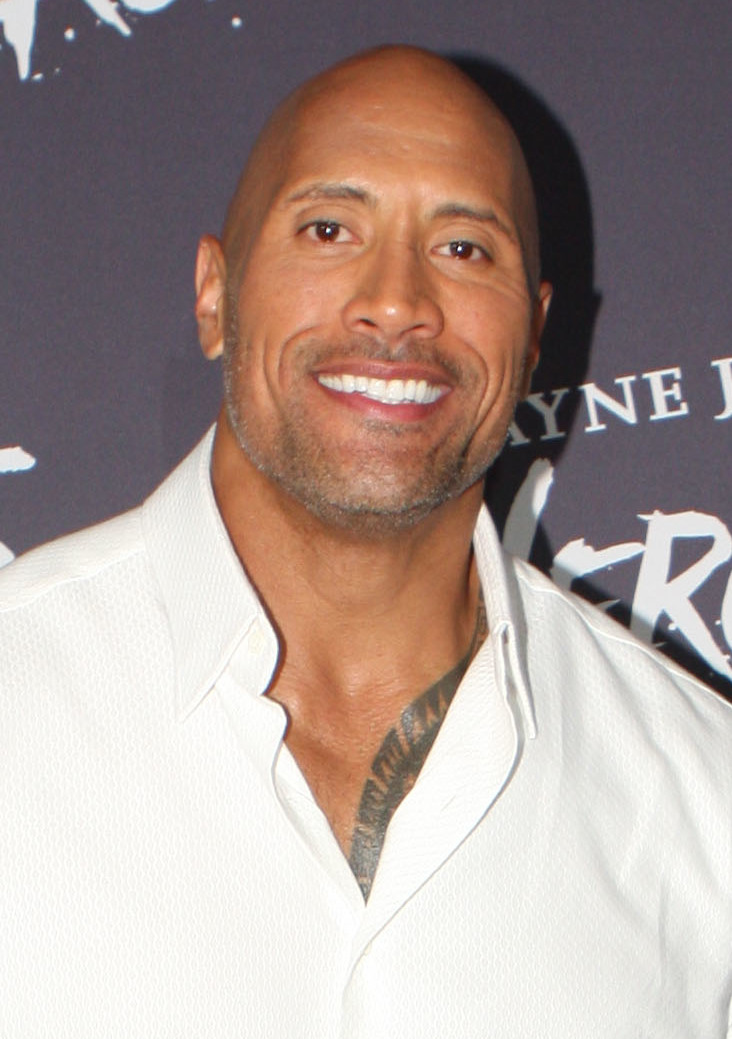
American actor Dwayne Johnson voices Swift's male alter-ego in the music video.

=== Background ===
On February 25, 2020, Swift announced via her social media accounts that the music video would be released in two days. The video was directed by Swift, making it her official solo directorial debut. Swift answered fan questions in the hour before the music video's premiere on YouTube on February 27, 2020. She stated that the entire preparation for the music video—including planning meetings, creating mood boards, scouting locations, and costume and set design—took several months. She also confirmed that there would be many of her trademark "easter eggs" in the video.

With "The Man" music video, I wanted to show a heightened reaction of how the world reacts to someone who's male, hot, rich, young and cocky. I wanted to show how there's immediate approval and benefit of the doubt given, in a ridiculous way.

— Swift, The Man (Behind the Scenes: Directing), YouTube

The video features cameos from TikTok stars Loren Gray (the second most followed on the platform at the time) and Dominic Toliver, actress Jayden Bartels, and Swift's father Scott Swift; actor Dwayne Johnson appears in a brief voice role. The video's production team includes producer Jil Hardin, executive producer Rebecca Skinner, assistant director Joe Osborne, cinematographer Rodrigo Prieto, production designer Ethan Tobman, and makeup artist Bill Corso. Swift's transformation involved a "muscle suit", prosthetic makeup, eyebrow wigs, and facial sculptures, which took between four and six hours to apply each day. She also worked with movement coaches Stephen Galloway and Spenser Theberge, as well as editor Chancler Haynes. Visual effects were handled by Ingenuity Studios.

=== Synopsis and analysis ===
The satirical music video explores Swift's life as her theoretical male counterpart, an alter-ego named "Tyler Swift". The video presents numerous prevalent examples of double standards in society, and comments on the objectification and sexualization of women, toxic masculinity, patriarchy, as well as performative allyship. Throughout the video, the male version of Swift is seen rudely inconveniencing the people around him, leading a luxurious and promiscuous lifestyle, manspreading, receiving praise for the bare minimum, and throwing tantrums without consequences. It contains visual references to The Wolf of Wall Street (2013), a film involving the lyrically name-checked actor DiCaprio and cinematographer Prieto, and journalists felt the tennis scene referenced tennis player Serena Williams' match controversy with a chair umpire at the 2018 US Open Championships.

Swift's male alter-ego, Tyler Swift (middle), manspreading on a metro train

The video has several easter eggs alluding to Swift's other work, including Speak Now, Red, 1989, and Reputation graffiti on a wall. Fearless is written backwards, while the title of her eponymous debut album appears in a sign saying "Missing: If Found Return to Taylor Swift". The "missing" sign, along with another wordless sign that appears to ban riding scooters, references her 2019 dispute with Scooter Braun and Big Machine Records over the ownership of the master recordings of her first six studio albums. Lover, the first album that Swift completely owns herself, is absent, but the word "karma" is written twice on the wall, a possible reference to Swift's plan to re-record her previous works thus lowering the value of the originals. The camera subsequently pans over a "Mr. Americana" poster for a film starring Tyler Swift, directed by Larry Wilson, and premiering at the 2020 Mandance Festival, a word play on Swift's Netflix documentary Miss Americana directed by Lana Wilson, which debuted at the 2020 Sundance Film Festival. Swift's alter-ego runs down a hallway giving high-fives to nineteen disembodied hands, alluding to double standards behind the walk of shame that women are often forced to take after a sexual encounter. The hands are said to be a reference to the 19th amendment of the United States Constitution, which granted women the right to vote in the country.

In the final scene, Swift herself appears as the video's director to instruct her male alter-ego to be both "sexier" and "more likeable" in the next take—a dig at the entertainment industry's objectification of and sexist treatment toward women. Ending on messages of female empowerment, Swift then turns to praise Loren Gray for her acting performance as a tennis ball girl, despite her role consisting of nothing more than an eye roll. The end credits list Swift as the director, writer, owner, and star of the music video, Johnson as the voice of "The Man", and shows photos of Swift's transformation process into the male lead of the video. It ends with a disclaimer stating "No men were harmed in the making of this video".

=== Reception ===
The video received critical acclaim. Bryan Rolli of Forbes highlighted that the video is characterized by an "exaggerated and cartoonish" attitude "in a self-aware way", typical of Swift's "most memorable videos". He further expanded that "obviously, not every man acts like her [Swift's] character; that's not the point. The point is to make a caricature of the buffoonish men who feel the need to criticize successful women like Swift for merely existing and dissect every public decision they make, whereas their male counterparts would receive praise for the same actions". Avery Blank, also writing for Forbes, opined that the video is a "reminder that women continue to face challenges when it comes to owning their ideas and maintaining control over their own careers" and that the society "expects women to be team players and not worry about getting credit for their work". She further added that the video makes it clear to viewers that Swift "will not let people mess with her". Glamour's Chloe Laws wrote that the "empowering" video "calls out sexism and the industry's double standards", which is "a small part of the bigger journey she's [Swift is] embarked on lately", by "refusing to let someone else control her narrative". Vox's Constance Grady opined that Swift is "one of our great pop storytellers", proved by the video that becomes "the climax of her quest to own her voice".

Billboard's Rania Aniftos commended that Swift undergoes an "intense make-over" in the "visually stunning clip", to become a "bearded, belligerent corporate titan whose rocket fuel is non-stop high-fives, fist-pounds, empty praise and rounds of shots with his amped-up bros". Vulture's Zoey Haylock commented that Swift as a man resembles Harry Styles, Jake Gyllenhaal and Joe Alwyn combined, appreciating the makeup and prosthetics as "award worthy". Vogue's Hayley Maitland and Noami Pike described Swift's male alter ego as "the human embodiment of toxic masculinity". Rolling Stone's Claire Shaffer stated that Swift "dons full drag to portray the worst of masculinity". iHeartRadio's Paris Close commended that the video "does well to demonstrate how the hubris of male privilege plays out in the real world". CNN's Lisa France opined that Swift is "unrecognizable" in the video, that "brings to life Swift's lyrics about how differently the world views men and women". Writing for The Washington Post, Katie Shepherd and Allyson Chiu pointed out that the video is Swift's "gender-bending takedown of the patriarchy", that "skewer toxic masculinity and double standards, while airing personal grievances with an industry that has often subjected her to intense scrutiny". They added that Swift takes aim at "the cultural norms that allow, and at times even encourage, men to develop overinflated egos". Fast Company's Starr Rocque stated that Swift "examines the ridiculousness of gender roles and weaves that into a satirical spin on her own personal experiences and observations", adding that Swift "catches a lot of flack, but she's a fighter and always true to her brand of female empowerment". Swift's masculine appearance as "Tyler Swift" has been compared with that of Christian Bale, Harry Styles, Jake Gyllenhaal, and Joe Alwyn.

== Lyric video ==
Penrose stairs are incorporated into the lyric video to portray the never-ending difficulties faced by women in the corporate world.

An animated lyric video for the song was released on February 7, 2020, exploring visual themes of women empowerment, feminism, and workplace sexism.

The video depicts a power suit-wearing woman, the only female figure in a maze-like city full of taller and larger corporate male drones, as she tries to navigate through staircases that lead to nowhere. She is forced to run past the sauntering men to avoid getting trampled. When the woman finally reaches the top of a building, symbolizing her climb up the corporate ladder, the male drones push her off and leave her to freefall to death; thankfully, she is caught by another, benevolent, giant woman and shown to a place where all the women walk together in solidarity towards the city. The ending of the video implies that the true key to success for women is to lift each other up.

Some of the visuals featured in the video bear resemblance to those from the 2010 movie Inception, which stars the actor name-checked in the song, Leonardo DiCaprio.

== Accolades ==
At the 2020 MTV Video Music Awards, Swift scored a win at Best Direction for "The Man" music video, and became the first solo female artist in VMA history to win that category.

Award and nominations for "The Man"
Year	Organization	Award	Result	Ref.
2020	MTV Video Music Awards	Video of the Year	Nominated	
2020	MTV Video Music Awards	Video for Good	Nominated	
2020	MTV Video Music Awards	Best Direction	Won	
2020	MTV Europe Music Awards	Best Video	Nominated	
2021	BMI Pop Awards	Award-Winning Songs	Won	
2021	BMI Pop Awards	Publisher of the Year (Sony/ATV)	Won	
2021	Webby Awards	Best Music Video	Nominated	

== Live performances ==
=== City of Lover ===
Swift performed "The Man" for the first time at the "City of Lover" one-off concert at L'Olympia in Paris, France, on September 9, 2019. On February 17, 2020, the singer announced on her social media platforms the release of that live version under the title "The Man (Live from Paris)". The song was released the next day along with the live video of its performance. It was later included on C side of limited live album Lover (Live from Paris) released on 2023 Valentine's Day.

Billboard commented that the "glorious" live video is a "work of beauty", that sees Swift playing acoustic guitar, with her looking "relaxed and confident as the audience sings back every word of the song". E! News stated that the video "will empower you to conquer all", where "the superstar once again proved her unbelievable talent". They added that Swift "lit up" the stage, with just a single spotlight, "as she plays the acoustic guitar, the audience cheers along to the feminist anthem". Calling the video "intimate yet grand", Uproxx opined that the song "retains its earworm qualities in the acoustic rendition", despite the original version being "a catchy, synth-led tune".

=== Other ===
An acoustic version of "The Man" was performed at a Tiny Desk Concert for NPR Music on October 11, 2019. During the 47th Annual American Music Awards, held on November 24, 2019, in Los Angeles, Swift performed a medley of her hits which began with an excerpt of "The Man", when she was joined by a group of young girls. She wore white shirt with the titles of her first six studio albums written on it, which she unbuttoned and progressed to "Love Story". The song was included on the set list of her sixth headlining concert tour, the Eras Tour (2023–2024), with the singer wearing an oversized Versace business sequin jacket. Architectural Digest's Katherine McLaughlin wrote that the stage "uses scaffolding and office props to emulate a corporate environment", with Emily Yahr of The Washington Post noticing the resemblance to the office seen in the music video.

== Impact ==
In honor of International Women's Day in 2020, "The Man" was added to playlists on streaming platforms such as Apple Music, Spotify, and Tidal. Public figures such as Malala Yousafzai and Kristin Chenoweth added the song to their International Women's Day playlists. Furthermore, Swift included the song in her Apple Music "Playlist by ME!", which was updated to spotlight songs from female artists such as Beabadoobee, Clairo, Phoebe Bridgers, Caroline Polachek, Celeste, Charli XCX, Daya, Grimes, Haim, Halsey, Léon, H.E.R., Kesha, King Princess, Marina Diamandis, MUNA, Oh Wonder, Brittany Howard, Margaret Glaspy, Princess Nokia, Selena Gomez, Låpsley, Yebba, and more.

In March 2020, British politician Liz Truss, the Secretary of State for International Trade and Minister for Women and Equalities of the United Kingdom, quoted the song's lyrics during a special International Women's Day debate in the British parliament, while talking about the need for gender equality across the workforce and greater protection for women against domestic violence. Truss stated: "And so that, in the words of the brilliant Taylor Swift in her new song, 'women are left running as fast as they can, wondering if they'd get there quicker if they were a man'."

American journalist Jody Rosen, writing for The New York Times, listed "The Man" as one of the "25 songs that matter now". Describing Swift as "pop's best humblebraggart", Rosen termed "The Man" as a "sly protest song", explaining that Swift "has been pop's top bellyacher, turning a now-familiar set of grievances into great songs". He added that Swift "channels that indignation into a broader protest against the sexism and skepticism that all women face". Rosen also opined that the song's "most hard-hitting line is a plaintive rhetorical question that calls to mind a #MeToo movement slogan: #BelieveWomen".

Naming "The Man" as the "most important" song Swift has ever written, Brittany Hodak of Forbes, commended that "the magic of "The Man" is not just that it captures a complex (and often misunderstood) issue so brilliantly and simply, but also that it conveys to Swift's female fans that even she isn't above the BS that so many of us are regularly subjected to". Hodak concluded that she is "hopeful that Swift's spotlight on the issue will spark a national conversation about sexism, power, and equality".

== Credits and personnel ==
Credits adapted from Tidal

- Taylor Swift – vocals, songwriter, producer
- Joel Little – producer, songwriter, drum programmer, keyboards, recording engineer
- John Hanes – mix engineer
- Serban Ghenea – mixer
- John Rooney – assistant recording engineer

== Charts ==
=== Weekly charts ===
Weekly chart performance for "The Man"
Chart (2019–2020)	Peak position
Australia (ARIA)	17
Austria (Ö3 Austria Top 40)	66
Belgium (Ultratip Bubbling Under Flanders)	18
Belgium (Ultratip Bubbling Under Wallonia)	7
Bolivia (Monitor Latino)	5
Canada Hot 100 (Billboard)	21
Canada AC (Billboard)	29
Canada CHR/Top 40 (Billboard)	26
Canada Hot AC (Billboard)	14
Czech Republic Airplay (ČNS IFPI)	36
Czech Republic Singles Digital (ČNS IFPI)	33
Estonia (Eesti Ekspress)	34
Greece International (IFPI)	27
Hungary (Stream Top 40)	30
Ireland (IRMA)	16
Japan Streaming (Oricon)	44
Lithuania (AGATA)	24
Malaysia (RIM)	12
Netherlands (Single Top 100)	62
New Zealand (Recorded Music NZ)	15
Norway (VG-lista)	24
Portugal (AFP)	52
Scottish Singles Sales (Official Charts)	62
Singapore (RIAS)	10
Slovakia Singles Digital (ČNS IFPI)	31
Sweden (Sverigetopplistan)	63
Switzerland (Schweizer Hitparade)	80
UK Singles (Official Charts)	21
US Billboard Hot 100	23
US Adult Contemporary (Billboard)	21
US Adult Pop Airplay (Billboard)	9
US Pop Airplay (Billboard)	20
Venezuela Anglo (Record Report)	9
Venezuela Pop (Record Report)	23

=== Year-end charts ===
Year-end chart performance for "The Man"
Chart (2020)	Position
US Adult Top 40 (Billboard)	36

== Certifications ==
Certifications for "The Man"
Region	Certification	Certified units/sales
Australia (ARIA)	5× Platinum	350,000^{‡}
Brazil (Pro-Música Brasil)	2× Platinum	80,000^{‡}
Denmark (IFPI Danmark)	Gold	45,000^{‡}
France (SNEP)	Gold	100,000^{‡}
New Zealand (RMNZ)	2× Platinum	60,000^{‡}
Poland (ZPAV)	Gold	25,000^{‡}
Spain (Promusicae)	Gold	30,000^{‡}
United Kingdom (BPI)	Platinum	600,000^{‡}
United States (RIAA)	Platinum	1,000,000^{‡}
^{‡} Sales+streaming figures based on certification alone.

== Release history ==
Release formats for "The Man"
Region	Date	Format(s)	Version	Label	Ref.
United States	January 27, 2020	Hot adult contemporary	Original	Republic	
United States	January 28, 2020	Contemporary hit radio	Original	Republic	
Italy	February 14, 2020	Radio airplay	Original	Universal	
Various	February 18, 2020	Digital download; streaming	Live	Republic	
