= Christmas Tree Farm =

2019 single by Taylor Swift

Single by Taylor Swift
- Written: December 1, 2019
- Released: December 6, 2019
- Recorded: December 2–3, 2019
- Studio: London Lane (London)
- Genre: Christmas; pop
- Length: 3:47
- Label: Republic
- Songwriter: Taylor Swift
- Producers: Taylor Swift; Jimmy Napes

Taylor Swift singles chronology
"Lover" (2019)	"Christmas Tree Farm" (2019)	"The Man" (2020)

Music video
- "Christmas Tree Farm" on YouTube

"Christmas Tree Farm" is a Christmas song by the American singer-songwriter Taylor Swift. She wrote it on December 1, 2019, inspired by her affection for the holiday season, and produced it with Jimmy Napes. Republic Records released the track as a single on December 6 of that year. Opening with a 1950s-inspired jazzy intro, "Christmas Tree Farm" is a pop ballad driven by an upbeat arrangement, orchestral treatment, and jingle bells. The lyrics are about Swift's childhood memories of Christmas.

Music critics have praised "Christmas Tree Farm" as catchy and its lyricism as nostalgia-inducing; they have retrospectively listed it as one of the best Christmas songs. It reached number 91 on the Billboard Global 200 chart and the top 30 on the national charts of Croatia, Flanders, Hungary, and Scotland. The track received gold certifications in Australia, New Zealand, and the United Kingdom.

Swift directed the music video for "Christmas Tree Farm", which features childhood home footage of her and her family. She performed the song live in 2019 at the Jingle Bell Ball in London and the iHeartRadio Jingle Ball in New York City; the live version from the latter was released digitally in December 2020. An "Old Timey Version" of the track, in which the orchestral accompaniment is more emphasized along with elements of swing music, was released to digital music platforms in November 2022.

== Background and release ==
Having grown up in Pine Ridge Farm, a Christmas tree farm in Pennsylvania, Taylor Swift has expressed her love for the holiday season throughout her career and her desire for it to be "all year round". She stated that she helped her dad manage the farm during her childhood and that the environment influenced her affection for the season. Swift's first Christmas record, The Taylor Swift Holiday Collection (2007), features four covers of Christmas songs and two original tracks that she wrote.

In 2019, Swift wrote, recorded, and released "Christmas Tree Farm" in under six days. She wrote the song on piano on December 1, and recorded her vocals the following day. On December 3, a group of choral singers provided background vocals. Swift announced the track on Good Morning America on December 5, before Republic Records released it as a single the following day. A behind-the-scenes video that showcases the song's creation process was released on December 23, 2019.

Republic Records released a live recording from iHeartRadio's 2019 Jingle Ball for digital download and streaming on December 19, 2020. Swift announced an "Old Timey Version" of the track on Good Morning America on November 22, 2021; it was released on the same day as an Amazon Music exclusive alongside a making-of video. The "Old Timey Version" was released to other digital music platforms on November 23, 2022. A collection containing the original, new, and live versions was released digitally in November 2024. "Christmas Tree Farm" was later promoted to Italian radio airplay on December 13, 2024.

== Production and composition ==
Swift produced "Christmas Tree Farm" with Jimmy Napes, who provided background vocals and played piano. Gus Pirelli played Moog bass and recorded the track at London Lane Studios in the United Kingdom, assisted by Jamie McEvoy, Joseph Wander, and Will Purton. Serban Ghenea provided audio mixing, with John Hanes serving as the mixing engineer. Simon Hale conducted the string arrangement and Lawrence Johnson worked as the vocal arranger. Musicians who played instruments for "Christmas Tree Farm" include Bruce White (viola), Jodi Milliner (bass guitar), Ian Burdge (cello), Chris Laurence (double bass), and Ash Soan (drums); John Thurgood, Laurence Davies, and Martin Owen played French horn.

"Christmas Tree Farm"
"Christmas Tree Farm" begins with a jazzy intro and transitions into a pop ballad that features an upbeat arrangement and jingle bell percussion. Critics viewed it as a return to Swift's country music roots.

At 3 minutes and 47 seconds long, "Christmas Tree Farm" is a pop ballad that features an upbeat arrangement, uptempo rhythm, and 1960s music influences. (Note: Attributed to Consequence's Abby Jones, The Tennessean's Matthew Leimkuehler, People's Andrea Wurzburger, and Billboard's Glenn Rowley) It begins with a jazzy intro showcasing 1950s-inspired strings, which Gwen Ihnat of The A.V. Club compared to the music of Nat King Cole and Karen Carpenter. It then shifts into an upbeat pop arrangement with jingle bell percussion, a sound that critics connected to Mariah Carey and Phil Spector. Parade's Jessica Sager similarly compared its composition to Spector's album A Christmas Gift for You from Phil Spector (1963). Some critics, such as Ihnat and NME's Hannah Mylrea, described the song as a return to Swift's country music roots. Featuring a new arrangement and a 70-piece orchestra, the "Old Timey Version" incorporates horns, strings, and muted jingle bells along with elements of swing music.

The lyrics recall Swift's nostalgic childhood memories from an adult perspective. In the intro, she expresses her stress amid the chaotic nature of the holiday season, before she closes her eyes and envisions being in a different place. She wishes to visit the Christmas tree farm in her heart and depicts a fanciful scene: "In my heart is a Christmas tree farm/ Where the people would come/ To dance under sparkling lights/ Bundled up in their mittens and coats/ And the cider would flow/ And I just wanna be there tonight." Swift sings in the hook to her lover, "Everything is icy and blue/ And you would be there too", before admitting in the refrain, "Just being in your arms/ Takes me back to that little farm/ Where every wish comes true."

== Critical reception ==
Music critics believed that "Christmas Tree Farm" succeeded in the context of using the holiday season to reflect Swift's childhood memories, and lauded the youthful and nostalgic feel of the song. Paste's Jane Song dubbed it "twinkly, fresh and happy", Esquire's Bria McNeal described it as "dazzling", and Mylrea thought that it captured "everything that's great about a Christmas song"–an upbeat tune, a cozy feeling, and a soothing nature. Several music journalists praised "Christmas Tree Farm" as catchy and dubbed it an "earworm".

The production of "Christmas Tree Farm" was also a subject of praise by critics, who believed that its heavy orchestration resulted in "maximum holiday glee" and praised its "irrepressible" hook. American Songwriter's Alex Hopper thought that best part of the song was the bridge and considered the track one of the five most underrated Christmas songs. "Christmas Tree Farm" appeared in rankings of Swift's discography by Song (72 out of 158), Mylrea (84 out of 161), Vulture's Nate Jones (185 out of 245), and Rolling Stone's Rob Sheffield (214 out of 286).

Several publications included "Christmas Tree Farm" on lists of the best Christmas songs. British GQ and NME listed it among the best new Christmas songs of 2019. The A.V. Club included it on its list of the 18 best Christmas songs of the 2010s decade in 2020, and Billboard ranked it as the ninth-best Christmas song of the 21st century in 2025. Stylist named "Christmas Tree Farm" the fifth-best Christmas song of all time, while PinkNews picked it as the 12th-best. The track also appeared in all-time rankings by Time Out (16 out of 50), Cosmopolitan (45 out of 80), Glamour (53 out of 55), and Parade (76 out of 200). It was included in unranked lists by Entertainment Weekly and Esquire.

== Commercial performance ==
"Christmas Tree Farm" debuted at number 147 on the Billboard Global 200 chart on the week ending January 2, 2021, before peaking at number 84 in January 2026. In the United States, it accumulated 7.7 million streams and sold 26,000 digital downloads in its opening week, debuting at number two on the Digital Songs chart dated December 12, 2019. The song marked Swift's 49th top-ten song on the chart, extending her all-time record. On the week ending December 14, 2019, it debuted at number 25 on the Adult Contemporary chart, before peaking at number three in its third week. The song debuted at number 59 on the Billboard Hot 100 chart dated December 21, 2019, becoming Swift's 96th entry on the chart. It reached number 19 on the Holiday 100 chart, number 40 on the Adult Pop Airplay chart, and number 65 on the Rolling Stone Top 100 chart.

In the United Kingdom, "Christmas Tree Farm" debuted at number 71 in December 2019, before peaking at number 44 in December 2021. It reached number 13 in Croatia, number 16 in Scotland, number 23 in Flanders, number 29 in Hungary, number 40 in Canada, number 49 in Australia, and number 50 in Switzerland. The track was certified gold in Australia, New Zealand, and the United Kingdom.

"Christmas Tree Farm (Old Timey Version)" reached number 98 on the Billboard Global 200 chart dated January 1, 2022. In the United States, it peaked at number 22 on the Adult Contemporary chart, number 46 on the Holiday 100 chart, and number 62 on the Billboard Hot 100 chart. "Christmas Tree Farm (Old Timey Version)" reached number 84 on the national chart of Sweden in the last week of 2023.

== Music video ==
The music video for "Christmas Tree Farm" features a clip of Swift getting gifted with her first guitar on Christmas.

Swift announced the self-directed music video for "Christmas Tree Farm" on her social media accounts on December 5, 2019. The video aired on Good Morning America on the morning of the following day, and it was released digitally along with a lyric video. The music video features childhood home footage of Swift and her family, filmed at Pine Ridge Farm. It captures them sledding, sitting on Santa's lap, playing in the snow, and gathering by a Christmas tree.

The music video includes a clip of Swift joyfully unwrapping a present containing her first acoustic guitar on a Christmas morning; Melody Chiu of People described it as the video's "most heartwarming moment". The video additionally features footage of the farm days before Swift's birth and transitions to its different areas, showcasing stockings placed by the fireplace, numerous Christmas lights decorated around the home, and Swift's pet dog playing in the garden.

== Live performances ==
Swift performed "Christmas Tree Farm" at the Jingle Bell Ball in London on December 8, 2019, wearing a white belted playsuit and thigh-high boots; footage of her childhood and falling snowflakes appeared in the background. On December 13, she reprised the performance at Madison Square Garden in New York City as part of the iHeartRadio Jingle Ball, donning a gold sequined dress and knee-high boots. Rolling Stone's Patrick Doyle complimented Swift's vocals and described the performance as featuring "Beach Boys-y harmonies and a Wall of Sound arrangement".

== Credits and personnel ==
Credits were adapted from Qobuz.

- Taylor Swift – vocals, songwriter, producer
- Jimmy Napes – producer, background vocals, piano
- Serban Ghenea – mixer
- John Hanes – mixing engineer
- Gus Pirelli – recording engineer, Moog bass
- Jamie McEvoy – assistant recording engineer
- Joseph Wander – assistant recording engineer
- Will Purton – assistant recording engineer
- Bruce White – viola
- Jodi Milliner – bass guitar
- Ian Burdge – cello
- Chris Laurence – double bass
- Ash Soan – drums
- John Thurgood, Laurence Davies, Martin Owen – French horn
- Simon Hale – string arranger
- Lawrence Johnson – vocal arranger
- Candice-Mimi Otohwo, Destinee Knight-Scott, Glenn Tatenda Gwazai, Jessica Mae Obioha, Lorrain Briscoe, Margeaux Michelle, Paul Lee, Tarna Renae Johnson, Tehillah Daniel, The LJ Singers, Travis J Cole, Wayne Hernandez, Wendi Rose – background vocals

== Charts ==
=== Weekly charts ===
Chart performance for the original version
Chart (2019–2026)	Peak position
Australia (ARIA)	49
Austria (Ö3 Austria Top 40)	50
Belgium (Ultratop 50 Flanders)	23
Canada Hot 100 (Billboard)	40
Canada AC (Billboard)	8
Canada CHR/Top 40 (Billboard)	49
Canada Hot AC (Billboard)	35
Croatia International Airplay (Top lista)	13
Estonia Airplay (TopHit)	60
Euro Digital Song Sales (Billboard)	16
France (SNEP)	96
Germany (GfK)	60
Global 200 (Billboard)	84
Greece International (IFPI)	70
Hungary (Single Top 40)	29
Ireland (IRMA)	51
Mexico Ingles Airplay (Billboard)	25
Netherlands (Single Tip)	1
New Zealand Hot Singles (RMNZ)	9
Portugal (AFP)	137
Scottish Singles Sales (Official Charts)	16
Spain (PROMUSICAE)	83
Sweden Heatseeker (Sverigetopplistan)	8
Switzerland (Schweizer Hitparade)	50
UK Singles (Official Charts)	44
US Billboard Hot 100	59
US Adult Contemporary (Billboard)	3
US Adult Pop Airplay (Billboard)	40
US Holiday 100 (Billboard)	19
US Rolling Stone Top 100	65

Chart performance for "Old Timey Version"
Chart (2021–2023)	Peak position
Global 200 (Billboard)	98
Sweden (Sverigetopplistan)	84
US Billboard Hot 100	62
US Adult Contemporary (Billboard)	22
US Holiday 100 (Billboard)	46

=== Monthly charts ===
Monthly chart performance
Chart (2025)	Peak position
Estonia Airplay (TopHit)	83

== Certifications ==
Certifications and sales
Region	Certification	Certified units/sales
Australia (ARIA)	Gold	35,000^{‡}
New Zealand (RMNZ)	Gold	15,000^{‡}
United Kingdom (BPI)	Gold	400,000^{‡}
^{‡} Sales+streaming figures based on certification alone.

== Release history ==
Release formats and dates
Region	Date	Format(s)	Version	Label	Ref.
Various	December 6, 2019	Digital download; streaming	Original	Republic	
Various	November 27, 2020	Picture disc	Original	Republic	
Various	December 19, 2020	Digital download; streaming	Live at the 2019 iHeartRadio Jingle Ball	Republic	
Various	November 22, 2021	Digital download; streaming (Amazon Music exclusive)	Old Timey Version	Republic	
Various	November 23, 2022	Digital download; streaming	Old Timey Version	Republic	
Italy	December 13, 2024	Radio airplay	Original	Island	
