= Death by a Thousand Cuts (song) =

2019 song by Taylor Swift

- Live from Paris cover artwork

Song by Taylor Swift

from the album Lover
- Written: 2019
- Released: August 23, 2019
- Studio: Electric Lady (New York City)
- Genre: Electropop
- Length: 3:19
- Label: Republic
- Songwriters: Taylor Swift; Jack Antonoff
- Producers: Taylor Swift; Jack Antonoff

Audio video
- "Death by a Thousand Cuts" on YouTube

"Death by a Thousand Cuts" is a song by the American singer-songwriter Taylor Swift from her seventh studio album, Lover (2019). Written and produced by Swift and Jack Antonoff, it is an upbeat, pop breakup song. Unlike Swift's previous autobiographical breakup songs, "Death by a Thousand Cuts" was influenced by her friends and fictional characters; she cited the 2019 romantic comedy film Someone Great as a key inspiration. The lyrics are based on character dynamics from the film, as they portray the protagonist's attempts to overcome the painful remnants of a failed relationship.

Critics compared "Death by a Thousand Cuts" to the works of many different artists. Commercially, the song charted in Australia, Canada, and the United States; it has received certifications in Australia, Brazil, New Zealand, and the United Kingdom. Swift performed "Death by a Thousand Cuts" at the one-off City of Lover concert and on NPR's Tiny Desk Concert in 2019, and multiple times during the Eras Tour (2023-24).

== Background ==
In March 2019, Elle issued Swift's essay called "30 Things I Learned Before Turning 30", which featured the singer questioning her songwriting skills―she was anxious about being in a healthy relationship, since most of her catalogue consists of songs about failed love experiences. Swift recalled being questioned about whether her successful songwriting would be impeded if she were to finally find happiness. Her solution turned out to be going back to her roots of getting inspiration taken from other people experiences or books and movies, as she used to do when she began writing at the age of 12. She told during her NPR Tiny Desk Concert that some of her friends finished their love encounters while she was developing Lover, and she absorbed various books and movies regarding breakups, that gave her idea to write a "Death by a Thousand Cuts". Swift elaborated on Elvis Duran and the Morning Show that one of the works that influenced the song was the 2019 romantic comedy film Someone Great, written and directed by Jennifer Kaytin Robinson. The film's director showed her appreciation on Instagram, revealing that her movie was mainly inspired by Swift's 2014 album 1989, and especially its closer "Clean".

== Music and lyrics ==
Written and produced by Swift and her friend and frequent collaborator Jack Antonoff, "Death by a Thousand Cuts" spans for three minutes and 19 seconds. Described by the singer herself as a "sad bop", "Death by a Thousand Cuts" is a "shimmering" pop and electropop torch song, whose "trippy" and "polyphonic" production complements sad lyrical subject matter. The song's instrumentation includes "faint" church bells, "slippery" guitar line, "tinkling" piano, "swirling" keyboards and "quivering" synths.

Writing for NME, Nick Levine said that "Death by a Thousand Cuts" has "echoes" of Fleetwood Mac's 1987 pop rock album Tango in the Night, while Lindsay Zoladz of The Ringer called it "Pitch Perfect-core" which will end up as "an a cappella group staple for many years to come". Vulture's Craig Jenkins opined that the "pretty guitar figure" of the song "carries a whiff of the Beatles's 'Blackbird'". Another comparison drew from the instrumentation was made in a review by Sal Cinquemani of Slant Magazine, he deemed the synthesizers and keyboards used in the track to be reminiscent of the Beach Boys's Pet Sounds (1966). For New York Times, Jon Caramanica argued that "Death by a Thousand Cuts" could be a Kelsea Ballerini song.

== Live performances ==
Swift debuted "Death by a Thousand Cuts" live during the one-off promotional concert City of Lover, which occurred at the Olympia theater in Paris, France, on September 9, 2019. She played it on an acoustic guitar, and during her emotional performance of the bridge, the audience sang along with her. The concert was filmed and later aired as a TV special on American Broadcasting Company (ABC) on May 17, 2020. The following day, the performance was released for a digital download and streaming. Sarah Carson from i called it "gorgerous", while NME's Hannah Mylrea opined that Swift turned the track into "earnest country-pop tune". Naming the eight best moments of the gig, Billboard's Jason Lipshutz wrote that Swift was "seething with emotion on the bridge before steadying herself with a sly grin". She later performed "Death by a Thousand Cuts" during her "intimate" performance for NPR Music, as part of their Tiny Desk Concert series in October 2019. She played the song on an acoustic guitar and discussed how it sounded during the writing process.

In 2023, Swift embarked on the Eras Tour, which introduced the acoustic set when the singer performed two different songs from her discography each show. On the second night in Arlington, on April 1, the singer decided to play "Death by a Thousand Cuts" on a guitar. Before she sang, Swift said that she was asked to sing this song by Antonoff, who attended the concert; she continued by recalling City of Lover, expressing her desire of her friend being present during this event, since "the crowd screamed the bridge so loudly". However, during the bridge, she messed up lyrics, and repeated it, later adding that she will sing any song again, if she would make a mistake during the performance. The singer kept her promise, singing "Death by a Thousand Times" again during a Los Angeles show on August 5. This time, Swift dedicated the song to Robinson, who was present in the audience. The following year, she introduced a mash-up of "Death by a Thousand Cuts" with "Babe" on guitar, during the March 7 concert at the Singapore National Stadium. Ashley Iasimone from Billboard reported that Swift "combined two of her most iconic breakup songs", People's Ilana Kaplan dubbed it as "sweet". She later performed the song as part of mash-ups with her tracks "Hits Different" (2022), "Getaway Car" (2018) and "The Great War" (2022) at the tour's London and Indianapolis stops.

== Credits and personnel ==
Credits are adapted from the liner notes of Lover.

Studios

- Recorded at Electric Lady Studios (New York City)
- Mixed at MixStar Studios (Virginia Beach)
- Mastered at Sterling Sound (New York City)

Personnel

- Taylor Swift – songwriting, production, vocals
- Jack Antonoff – songwriting, production, recording, guitar, keyboard, synthesizers
- Laura Sisk – recording
- John Rooney – recording assistant
- John Hanes – engineering
- Serban Ghenea – mixing
- Randy Merrill – mastering

== Charts ==
Chart performance for "Death by a Thousand Cuts"
Chart (2019)	Peak position
Australia (ARIA)	48
Canada Hot 100 (Billboard)	62
US Billboard Hot 100	67

== Certifications ==
Certifications for "Death by a Thousand Cuts"
Region	Certification	Certified units/sales
Australia (ARIA)	Platinum	70,000^{‡}
Brazil (Pro-Música Brasil)	Gold	20,000^{‡}
New Zealand (RMNZ)	Gold	15,000^{‡}
United Kingdom (BPI)	Silver	200,000^{‡}
^{‡} Sales+streaming figures based on certification alone.
