= Lover (Taylor Swift song) =

2019 single by Taylor Swift

- "First Dance Remix" cover artwork

Single by Taylor Swift

from the album Lover
- Released: August 16, 2019
- Studio: Electric Lady (New York)
- Genre: Country; indie folk; alternative country; dream pop; rock
- Length: 3:41
- Label: Republic
- Songwriter: Taylor Swift
- Producers: Taylor Swift; Jack Antonoff

Taylor Swift singles chronology
"You Need to Calm Down" (2019)	"Lover" (2019)	"Christmas Tree Farm" (2019)

Shawn Mendes singles chronology
"Señorita" (2019)	"Lover" (remix) (2019)	"Wonder" (2020)

Music video
- "Lover" on YouTube

"Lover" is a song written and recorded by the American singer-songwriter Taylor Swift for her seventh studio album, Lover (2019). She conceived it as a timeless love song meant for a wedding reception: the lyrics are about a committed romantic relationship, and the bridge draws on the bridal rhyme "Something old". Produced by Swift and Jack Antonoff, "Lover" is a ballad that incorporates country, indie folk, alternative country, dream pop, and rock, set to a waltzing tempo. Its reverbed production is driven by acoustic guitar and consists of snare drums, piano, and pizzicato strings. Republic Records released the song for download and streaming on August 16, 2019, and to US radio the next month.

Swift and Drew Kirsch directed the music video for "Lover", which was released on August 22, 2019; it follows a couple living inside a dollhouse in a snow globe. Republic Records released three alternate versions of "Lover": a duet remix featuring the Canadian singer Shawn Mendes, an orchestral "First Dance Remix" based on Swift's performance at the 2019 American Music Awards, and a live version recorded at her 2019 City of Lover concert. Swift performed the song on televised events such as the MTV Video Music Awards and Saturday Night Live, and she included it in the set list of her sixth concert tour, the Eras Tour (2023–2024).

Music critics lauded Swift's songwriting on "Lover" and commented that it showcased emotionally engaging lyrics and a romantic production. Many appreciated the acoustic production that was reminiscent of Swift's early-career albums. Publications including Billboard, Complex, and Pitchfork featured the song on their 2019 year-end lists. It was Swift's first solo-written track nominated for Song of the Year at the 2020 Grammy Awards, and its video received two MTV Video Music Award nominations. The single peaked within the top 10 on seven national charts and received multi-platinum certifications in Australia, Canada, New Zealand, and the United States.

== Writing and production ==
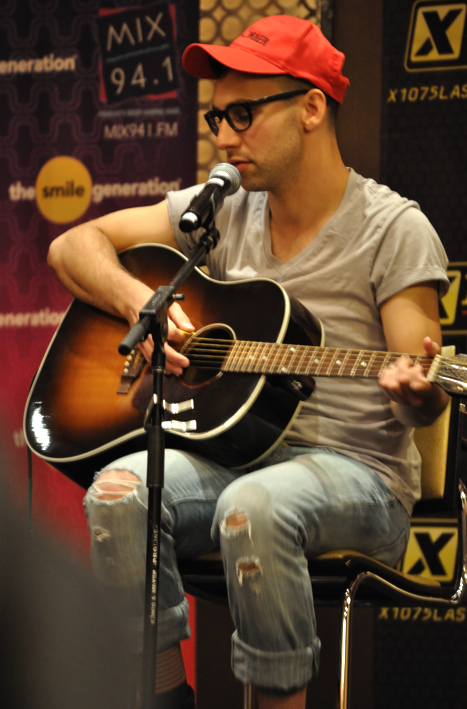
Jack Antonoff co-produced "Lover".

The American singer-songwriter Taylor Swift described her seventh studio album, Lover, as a "love letter to love" that conveys an emotional spectrum "through a romantic gaze". The album took under three months to record; recording ended in February 2019. Released on August 23, 2019, through Republic Records, Lover musically draws on 1980s-inspired pop rock and synth-pop. Its songs explore many aspects of Swift's personality and altogether convey her emotional liberation to embrace future possibilities, renouncing the media gossip and celebrity-inspired themes on her previous album, Reputation (2017). Jack Antonoff, who had worked with Swift on her two previous studio albums (1989 and Reputation), co-produced 11 tracks for Lover.

The title track, "Lover", is one of the three songs (alongside "Cornelia Street" and "Daylight") on the album that Swift wrote by herself. She wrote "Lover" late one night on piano at her home in Nashville, Tennessee. Though she quickly finished the refrain and the first verse, it took her longer to write the bridge, which she wanted to be a "fairy-tale lullaby fable expanding upon a song that has been not as detailed until that point", feeling that the verses were not up to her expectation. To that end, she was inspired by how newly-wed couples customize their marriage vows, and described the bridge as very personal and intimate. Swift said that "Lover" was the first "pure" love song she wrote, which she felt very proud of.

After finishing the lyrics, she sent a voice memo of the song to Antonoff; the two went to Electric Lady Studios in New York City together with the engineer Laura Sisk the next day to record the song. Recording took six hours to complete. Because Swift wanted "Lover" to be a timeless love song, she envisioned as if it could have been played "at a wedding reception in 1980 or 1970 or now". She and Antonoff used instruments that were all invented by the 1970s or earlier. They replaced the original piano with guitar, composed the bridge, and incorporated a bassline inspired by the music of Paul McCartney. Antonoff also played live drums, a bass guitar, an upright piano, and the Mellotron on "Lover", produced it with Swift, and recorded it with Sisk, assisted by John Rooney. Serban Ghenea, assisted by John Hanes, mixed the track at MixStar Studios in Virginia Beach, Virginia.

== Music ==
"Lover"
Built on a slow waltz tempo, "Lover" combines country and indie folk with a retro-styled musical motif. Primarily driven by acoustic guitars and percussion, the production incorporates booming snare drums, piano, reverbed vocals, and pizzicato strings.

"Lover" is built upon a slow waltz tempo and a retro-styled musical motif. Swift said while recording, she imagined the production to sound like "just the last two people on a dance floor at 3 a.m. swaying". The track is driven by acoustic instruments, primarily guitars and percussion. The production incorporates piano, reverbed drums and vocals, and Mellotron-simulated, pizzicato strings. The rhythm is punctuated by booming snare drums and a bass line described by Vanity Fair's Erin Vanderhoff as "sonorous, swung". Many critics compared the production to the music of the alternative rock band Mazzy Star, specifically their 1993 single "Fade into You".

Roisin O'Connor of The Independent described the track as a tender, 1960s-styled acoustic ballad that shows Swift experimenting with rhythm and meter. Many music critics, including Alice Vincent of The Daily Telegraph, Louise Bruton of The Irish Times, Will Hodgkinson of The Times, and Annie Zaleski of The A.V. Club, characterized "Lover" as a country song, with Zaleski describing it as a country torch song and an indie folk production. Vincent and NME's Karen Gwee considered the guitar-based melody of "Lover" a throwback to Swift's early country-music albums, with the former commenting that it is a "mature companion" to Fearless (2008) and Speak Now (2010). Nate Jones of Vulture and Nick Levine of NME aligned the track with alternative country, while Jon Caramanica of The New York Times described its sound as "a steroidal take on the alt-country of the 1990s".

In disagreement, Billboard's Jason Lipshutz argued that "Lover" was not a country song, but it "certainly nods to the bare songwriting that marked much of Swift's early career". In The Atlantic, Spencer Kornhaber said that the track could have been a country-music song had the production trimmed down the reverb and described it as a "dusky rock ballad". Mark Richardson of The Wall Street Journal deemed the genre dream pop, Mikael Wood from the Los Angeles Times called the song "dream-folk", and The Ringer's Lindsay Zoladz wrote that the single "doesn't sound like anything else currently popular" on either of country or pop radio formats.

== Lyrics and interpretation ==
The lyrics to "Lover" are about a couple's committed and intimate relationship. In the verses, the narrator describes scenes of their domestic life, such as leaving the Christmas lights on past the holiday season and having their friends sleeping over on the living-room floor. Swift initially wrote the opening line as, "We could leave the Christmas lights up 'til April," but changed it to "up 'til January" on the final version—despite Christmas not ending until January 6. She explained that the change was meant to portray simple and universal experiences of couples who live together, "It's not about that being a crazy thing. It's about how mundane it is." At one point, the narrator asks if she has known her love "20 seconds or 20 years". She asks to commit to her partner in the refrain, "Can I go where you go?/ Can we always be this close?"

The marriage-vow-inspired bridge is a declaration of their romance, "Ladies and gentlemen will you please stand/ With every guitar string scar in my hand/ I take this magnetic force of a man to be my lover." Swift said the cited lyrics were special to her, because it made her reflect on her past songwriting about failed relationships and heartbreak. The narrator promises to stay with her lover, "You'll save all your dirtiest jokes for me/ And at every table, I'll save you a seat." Some media publications noticed the lyric, "My heart's been borrowed and yours has been blue," drawing on the bridal rhyme "Something old", which describes the bridal costume on her wedding day, "Something old, something new, something borrowed, something blue."

Critics related the song's theme to Swift's past songs, with many drawing similarities between the narratives of "Lover" and "New Year's Day", a song taken from Reputation (2017). Jane Song from Paste noted the intertwined storylines between the two songs, dubbing "Lover" a sequel: "They're cleaning up bottles as they laugh at their friends passed out in the living room." Reviewers commented the narrator on "Lover" finally lives up her happily-ever-after dream that Swift's past songs strived for. Vincent opined that the "guitar string scars" imagery is an allusion to Swift's albums Red (2012) and 1989 (2014), on which she moved from country to pop. Meanwhile, Rob Sheffield of Rolling Stone deemed "Lover" a sequel to "Last Kiss", a song off Speak Now (2010), "but with a decade's worth more soul going into it". In Vulture, Craig Jenkins noticed its intimate and introspective sentiments after the two preceding singles for the album—"Me!" and "You Need to Calm Down"—which have lyrics concerning the outer world and empowering oneself. Jenkins surmised that after the negative press surrounding Reputation, "Lover" reflected Swift's desire to "want nothing more than a quiet place to retreat to when the rigors of life in public get her down".

== Release ==
Swift previewed "Lover" and part of the lyrics in a Vogue cover interview published on August 8, 2019. Three days later, she announced its release date at the 2019 Teen Choice Awards. Republic Records released "Lover" for digital download and streaming on August 16, 2019. The same day, a lyric video was released onto YouTube; it shows the song's lyrics projected onto a white bedsheet, on which home videos play in the background. On September 3, 2019, Hits reported that Republic had issued "Lover" to the US contemporary hit radio panels. Two days later, Billboard added that the track was also circulating on the adult contemporary format.

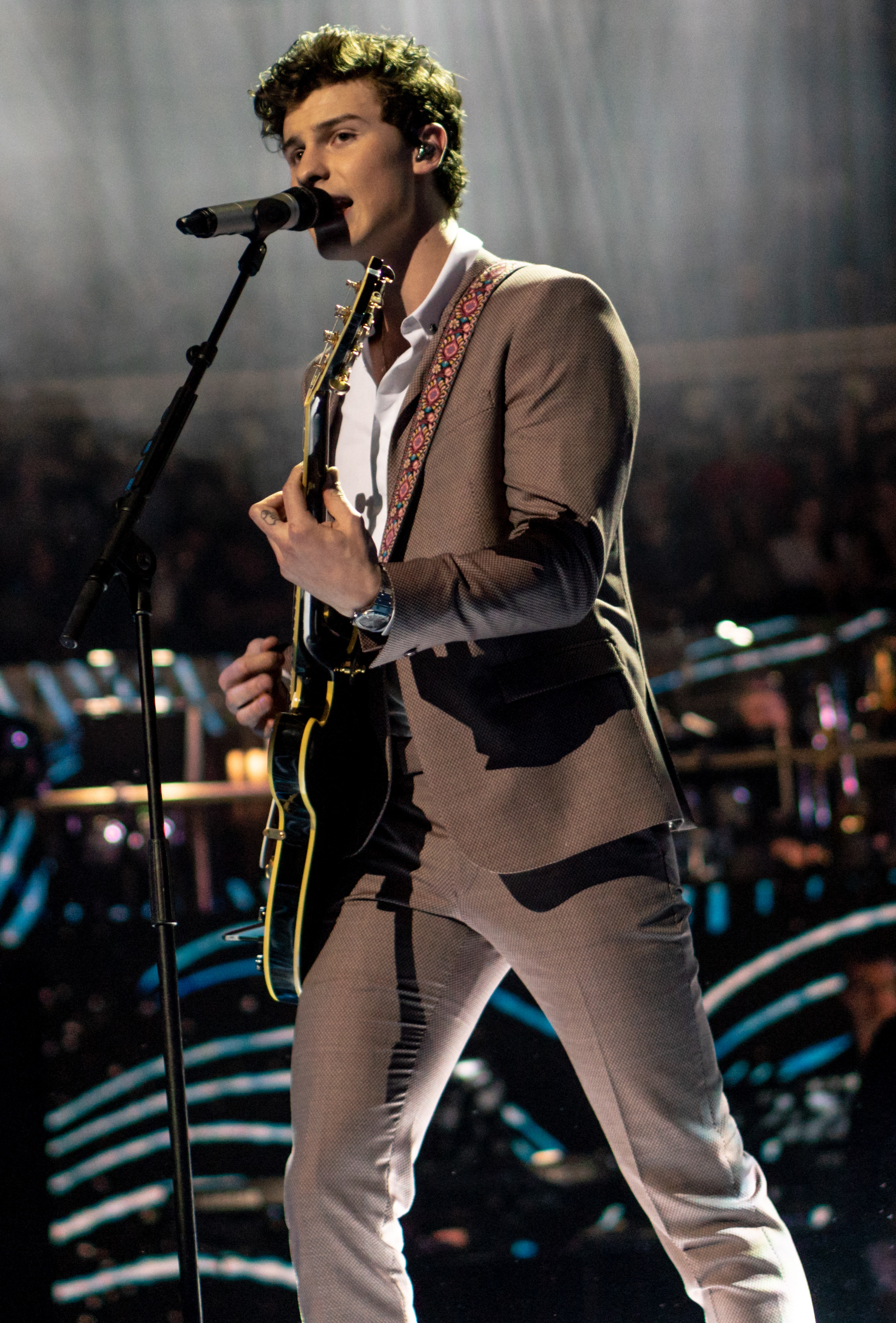
Shawn Mendes (pictured) featured on a duet remix of "Lover".

Republic Records released three alternate versions of "Lover". The first, a duet remix featuring the Canadian singer Shawn Mendes, was released on November 13, 2019. Mendes contributed verses written by himself. Media publications praised Mendes's verses and falsetto vocals but complained that they occasionally became cloying. The second, a remix subtitled "First Dance Remix", whose title refers to a newly-wed couple's opening dance at a wedding, was released on November 26, 2019. Featuring an orchestral arrangement used in Swift's performance at the 2019 American Music Awards, it received positive reviews for its ballroom atmosphere and production. The third, a live version subtitled "Live at Paris", recorded at Swift's City of Lover concert, was released on May 17, 2020.

== Music video ==
The music video for "Lover", directed by Swift and Drew Kirsch, premiered on YouTube on August 22, 2019, hours before the album's release. Christian Owens, a dancer on Swift's 1989 and Reputation tours, stars as the male lead. The video was filmed in a set in Hollywood. According to Swift, its concept was inspired by the lyric "You two are dancing in a snow globe round and round" from the song "You Are in Love", a song about two best friends in love, taken from Swift's album 1989.

The video begins with a child receiving a snow globe as a gift on Christmas Day, before focusing on the dollhouse inside the snow globe. Swift and Owens portray a couple who live in the house, which has seven distinctly-colored rooms. Each features scenes of the couple's domestic life through the ups and downs of their love. For instance, the green room shows Swift's character playing drums, the yellow room features the couple playing board games, the blue room has a giant fishbowl in which the couple swim, and an attic is where they reminisce by watching home videos. At the end, the child who receives the snow globe is revealed to be the couple's daughter. The video includes easter eggs to many of Swift's other songs and albums, including each room in the dollhouse represents one previous Taylor Swift's album (her later albums, Folklore, Evermore and Midnights, were referenced into the dollhouse and its related landscape by Taylor after their release). Media outlets welcomed the video's romantic and dreamy atmosphere; Teen Vogue's Mary Elizabeth Andriotis compared the cinematography to the films of Wes Anderson.

== Critical reception ==
"Lover" was met with widespread critical acclaim and was seen as a large improvement compared to the lukewarm reception to the more upbeat singles from Lover that preceded it. Critics praised what they described as intimate lyrics and a romantic production. Jay Willis of GQ, in a review of the album Lover, dubbed the song "the best love story" that Swift had ever produced. Many critics commended "Lover" as a testament to Swift's talents as a singer-songwriter, with Abby Aguirre of Vogue describing the song as a "romantic, haunting [...] singer-songwritery nugget". Slate critic Carl Wilson found the songwriting "replete with the little twists of phrase and zoomed-in details that make the best Swift songs so Swifty". The Independent's Alexandra Pollard called it a reminder of Swift's ability to "distil infatuation into something specific and universal".

The production was another point of praise. Zoladz said that "Lover", which she deemed the best single off the album, did not have commercial potential because it sounded like an outlier on radio, but for a good reason: "It's destined for more sacred spaces, like headphones, lonely car rides home after dropping someone off at an airport, and first dances at weddings." Bruton and Vincent described the romantic, "sepia-toned haze" as a welcoming artistic direction for Swift after the "messy clapbacks and vengeful undertones" directed at her media image on Reputation. NPR's Katie Alice Greer and The Boston Globe's Nora Princiotti lauded the bridge, with the former adding that the snare drums were her favorite sound on the album. Wilson lauded the "musical self-assuredness" that makes "Lover" a compelling track, and Toronto Star's Ben Rayner opined that the stripped-down production, compared to other upbeat album tracks, highlights Swift's vocals and makes it a standout.

Critics have featured "Lover" highly on rankings of all songs in Swift's discography, including Vulture's Nate Jones (2021), who ranked it 13th out of 179 songs; NME's Hannah Mylrea (2020), 12th out of 161, and Paste's Jane Song (2020), 6th out of 158. O'Connor ranked it 10th out of select 100 album tracks by Swift, lauding it as an experimental work "impressively bold this far into her career". Sheffield ranked "Lover" seventh in his 2021 ranking of Swift's 206-song catalog, praising her vocals as "the sensation at the top of the roller coaster when you realize you're zooming all the way down", and the use of the word "lover": "She reclaims the cringiest noun in the language and makes it credible for the first time since Prince sang, 'I Wanna Be Your Lover'."

=== Rankings ===
"Lover" featured on many publications' lists of the best songs of 2019. Cosmopolitan included it in the top 10, Elle placed it second among the "19 best love songs", and Idolator ranked it 63rd among the "75 best pop songs" of 2019. The track featured on unranked lists by Marie Claire and The Philadelphia Inquirer. Other publications that prominently ranked "Lover" in their year-end lists included Billboard (21st), Complex (35th), and Pitchfork (87th). In individual critics' lists, the song topped the list by David Farr from the Sarasota Herald-Tribune and made it to the top 10 (unranked) by Wilson. Insider included "Lover" at number 104 in their list of the 113 best songs of the 2010s decade.

== Commercial performance ==
In the United States, "Lover" debuted atop the Hot Digital Songs chart with 35,000 digital copies sold first-week, giving Swift her 18th chart topper and extending her record as the artist with the most Hot Digital Songs number-one songs. On the Billboard Hot 100 chart dated August 31, 2019, it debuted at number 19. After its music video was released, the song rose to number 10 on the next charting week, becoming Lover's third top-10 single and Swift's 25th top-10 chart entry. It spent a total of 22 weeks on the Hot 100. On Billboard's airplay charts, the single peaked at numbers 6 on Adult Pop Songs, 10 on Adult Contemporary, and 16 on Pop Songs. The Recording Industry Association of America, in October 2020, certified "Lover" double platinum for surpassing two million units based on sales and streaming.

"Lover" peaked within the top 20 on singles charts of other English-speaking countries, reaching number three in both Australia and New Zealand, number seven in Canada, number nine in Ireland, and number 14 in the United Kingdom. The single has been certified double platinum by the British Phonographic Industry, triple platinum by Music Canada, four-times platinum by Recorded Music NZ, and eight-times platinum by the Australian Recording Industry Association. In other markets, the song reached the top five on charts in Lebanon and Singapore and top 20 in Lithuania, Latvia, and Estonia; it has been certified diamond in Brazil and platinum in Austria, Denmark, Italy, Poland, Portugal, and Spain.

== Awards and nominations ==
At the 62nd Annual Grammy Awards in 2020, "Lover" was nominated for Song of the Year; it was Swift's first solo-written nomination and fourth overall after "You Belong with Me" in 2010, "Shake It Off" in 2015, and "Blank Space" in 2016. It lost to "Bad Guy", written by Billie Eilish and Finneas O'Connell; according to the Los Angeles Times, the Grammy loss prompted speculation on whether it was affected by Swift's dispute with the music executive Scooter Braun and her former label Big Machine, over the acquisition of the master recordings to her past albums. At the 2020 Nashville Songwriter Awards, organized by the Nashville Songwriters Association International, "Lover" was listed among "10 Songs I Wish I'd Written".

The single was one of the "10 International Gold Songs" awarded at Hong Kong's RTHK International Pop Poll Awards, and the Shawn Mendes remix was nominated for Best Remix at the iHeartRadio Music Awards. In 2021, Broadcast Music, Inc. during the BMI Pop Awards honored "Lover" as one of the 50 most-performed songs throughout the year, based on airplay and streaming performance. The music video won Best Production Design in a Video at the MVPA Awards, and received nominations for Favorite International Video at the Philippines' Myx Music Awards and Best Music Video and Best Cinematography at Poland's Camerimage film festival. At the 2020 MTV Video Music Awards, "Lover" was nominated for Best Pop Video and Best Art Direction. Kurt Gefke, the video's production designer, received a nomination in the "Short Format" category at the ADG Excellence in Production Design Awards.

== Live performances and cover versions ==
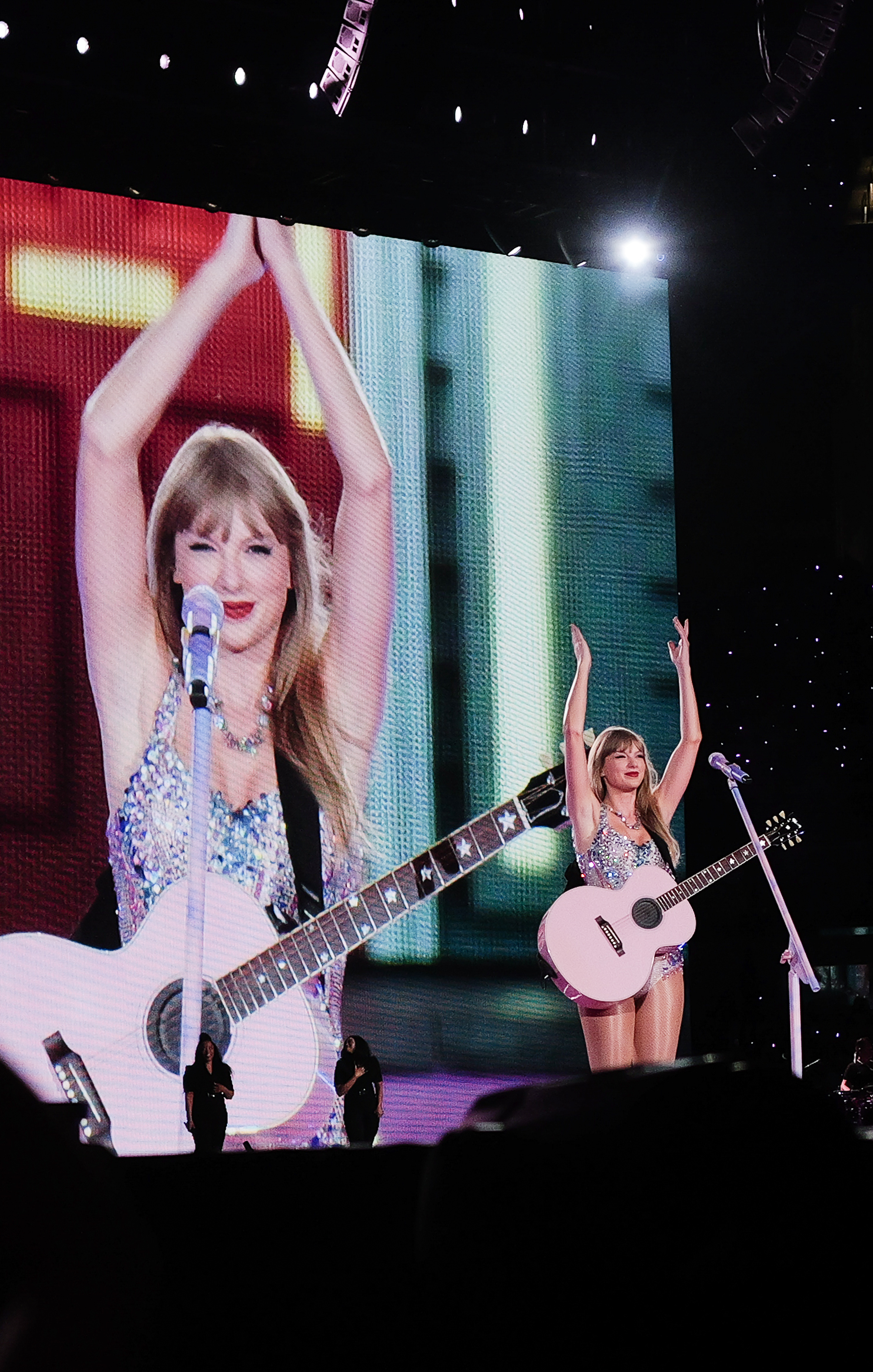
Swift performing "Lover" on the Eras Tour in 2023

Swift performed "Lover" live on many occasions during promotion of the album in 2019. She first reprised it as part of a medley with "You Need to Calm Down" at the 2019 MTV Video Music Awards, on August 26; she played the song with a pink guitar and was surrounded with blue lights and a hovering moon. She sang "Lover" as part of a mini-concert held at BBC Radio 1's Live Lounge, which premiered on September 2. On September 9, she included it in the set list to her one-off City of Lover concert in Paris. In October, she performed the song on Saturday Night Live, where she sang a stripped-down, piano-led version, at a Tiny Desk Concert for NPR Music, and at the We Can Survive charity concert in Los Angeles. On November 10, Swift sang the track on the piano at the Alibaba Singles' Day Gala in Shanghai.

At the 2019 American Music Awards on November 24, where Swift was honored as Artist of the Decade, she performed a medley of select singles, which included "Lover" with an orchestral arrangement. During the song, Swift played and sang on a piano, donning a pink cape with gold detailing, as Misty Copeland and Craig Hall performed a ballet. Variety's Chris Willman selected Swift's medley as the night's most memorable highlight, opining that the lush, string-laden orchestral atmosphere and the ballet performance elevated the show to a high point. The orchestral arrangement was incorporated into the original track, released as the "First Dance Remix". In December, she performed the song at Capital FM's Jingle Bell Ball 2019 in London and at iHeartRadio Z100's Jingle Ball in New York City. On December 14, Swift performed the song at the finale of BBC One's Strictly Come Dancing. Swift included "Lover" on the set list for the Eras Tour (2023–2024).

Keith Urban covered "Lover" at his Washington State Fair concert on August 31, 2019. He showed his gratitude for "Lover", which he described as "so exquisitely written [...] gorgeously crafted" that made him appreciate the "art of making music", on social media, and after the performance said he wish he had composed the song himself. Urban's cover was nominated for Best Cover Song at the 2020 iHeartRadio Music Awards. On March 4, 2020, Niall Horan and Fletcher released a cover version of the song, titled "Lover – Recorded at Air Studios, London", exclusively on Spotify. Critics described the cover as a power ballad combining rock styles such as pop rock and arena rock, with electric guitars, keyboard chords, and loud drums.

== Credits and personnel ==
Album version

- Taylor Swift – vocals, songwriter, producer
- Jack Antonoff – producer, programming, recording engineer, acoustic guitar, bass guitar, piano, keyboard, drums, percussion
- Serban Ghenea – mixing
- John Hanes – mix engineer
- John Rooney – assistant recording engineer
- Laura Sisk – recording engineer

Remix featuring Shawn Mendes

- Taylor Swift – vocals, songwriter, producer
- Jack Antonoff – producer, programmer, recording engineer, acoustic guitar, bass guitar, piano, keyboard, drums, percussion
- Serban Ghenea – mixing
- John Hanes – mix engineer
- John Rooney – assistant recording engineer
- Laura Sisk – recording engineer
- Shawn Mendes – vocals, songwriter
- Mike Gnocato – vocal engineer
- Scott Harris – songwriter
- George Seara – vocal engineer
- Zubin Thakkar – vocal producer

== Charts ==
=== Weekly charts ===
2019–2026 weekly chart positions for "Lover"
Chart (2019–2026)	Peak position
Australia (ARIA)	3
Austria (Ö3 Austria Top 40)	47
Belgium (Ultratop 50 Flanders)	16
Belgium (Ultratop 50 Wallonia)	39
Canada Hot 100 (Billboard)	7
Canada AC (Billboard)	17
Canada CHR/Top 40 (Billboard)	16
Canada Hot AC (Billboard)	9
Croatia (HRT)	39
Czech Republic Airplay (ČNS IFPI)	66
Czech Republic Singles Digital (ČNS IFPI)	13
Denmark Airplay (Tracklisten)	14
Estonia (Eesti Ekspress)	16
Euro Digital Song Sales (Billboard)	10
France (SNEP Sales Chart)	30
Germany (GfK)	61
Greece International (IFPI)	15
Hong Kong (HKRIA)	12
Hungary (Stream Top 40)	20
Ireland (IRMA)	9
Italy (FIMI)	87
Japan Hot 100 (Billboard)	76
Latvia (LAIPA)	14
Lithuania (AGATA)	13
Lebanon (Lebanese Top 20)	5
Mexico Airplay (Billboard)	26
Netherlands (Single Top 100)	79
New Zealand (Recorded Music NZ)	3
Panama Streaming (PRODUCE)	2347
Poland Airplay (ZPAV)	14
Portugal (AFP)	42
Scottish Singles Sales (Official Charts)	12
Singapore (RIAS)	2
Slovakia Singles Digital (ČNS IFPI)	18
Spain (PROMUSICAE)	87
Sweden (Sverigetopplistan)	37
Switzerland (Schweizer Hitparade)	52
UK Singles (Official Charts)	14
US Billboard Hot 100	10
US Adult Contemporary (Billboard)	10
US Adult Pop Airplay (Billboard)	6
US Pop Airplay (Billboard)	16

2023–2024 weekly chart positions for "Lover"
Chart (2023–2024)	Peak position
Global 200 (Billboard)	40
India International Singles (IMI)	1
Indonesia (Billboard)	24
Malaysia (Billboard)	17
Malaysia International (RIM)	13
Philippines (Billboard)	19
Singapore (RIAS)	3

=== Shawn Mendes remix ===
Weekly chart positions for "Lover" remix featuring Shawn Mendes
Chart (2019–2024)	Peak position
Lithuania (AGATA)	26
Malaysia (RIM)	20
Netherlands (Single Top 100)	95
New Zealand (Recorded Music NZ)	19
Philippines (Philippines Hot 100)	96
Singapore (RIAS)	20
Vietnam (Vietnam Hot 100)	59

=== Year-end charts ===
2019 year-end charts for "Lover"
Chart (2019)	Position
Australia (ARIA)	90
Belgium (Ultratop Flanders)	88
Canada (Canadian Hot 100)	96
Taiwan (Hito Radio)	25

2020 year-end charts for "Lover"
Chart (2020)	Position
Belgium (Ultratop Flanders)	95
Canada (Canadian Hot 100)	95
US Adult Contemporary (Billboard)	29
US Adult Pop Songs (Billboard)	25

2023 year-end chart for "Lover"
Chart (2023)	Position
Global 200 (Billboard)	153

2024 year-end chart for "Lover"
Chart (2024)	Position
Australia (ARIA)	81
Global 200 (Billboard)	64
India International (IMI)	16
Philippines (Philippines Hot 100)	65

== Certifications ==
Certifications for "Lover"
Region	Certification	Certified units/sales
Australia (ARIA)	8× Platinum	560,000^{‡}
Austria (IFPI Austria)	Platinum	30,000^{‡}
Brazil (Pro-Música Brasil)	Diamond	160,000^{‡}
Canada (Music Canada)	3× Platinum	240,000^{‡}
Denmark (IFPI Danmark)	Platinum	90,000^{‡}
France (SNEP)	Platinum	200,000^{‡}
Italy (FIMI)	Platinum	100,000^{‡}
New Zealand (RMNZ)	5× Platinum	150,000^{‡}
New Zealand (RMNZ) Shawn Mendes remix	Gold	15,000^{‡}
Norway (IFPI Norway)	Gold	30,000^{‡}
Poland (ZPAV)	Platinum	20,000^{‡}
Portugal (AFP)	Platinum	10,000^{‡}
Spain (Promusicae)	Platinum	60,000^{‡}
United Kingdom (BPI)	2× Platinum	1,200,000^{‡}
United States (RIAA)	2× Platinum	2,000,000^{‡}
Streaming
Japan (RIAJ)	Gold	50,000,000^{†}
^{‡} Sales+streaming figures based on certification alone.^{†} Streaming-only figures based on certification alone.

== Release history ==
Release dates and formats for "Lover"
Region	Date	Format(s)	Version	Label	Ref.
Various	August 16, 2019	Digital download; streaming	Original	Republic	
United States	September 3, 2019	Contemporary hit radio	Original	Republic	
Italy	September 6, 2019	Radio airplay	Original	Universal	
Various	November 13, 2019	Digital download; streaming	Remix featuring Shawn Mendes	Republic	
Canada	November 13, 2019	Contemporary hit radio; hot adult contemporary	Remix featuring Shawn Mendes	Republic	
Italy	November 15, 2019	Radio airplay	Remix featuring Shawn Mendes	Universal	
Various	November 26, 2019	Digital download; streaming	First Dance remix	Republic	
Canada	November 26, 2019	Contemporary hit radio; dance radio; hot adult contemporary	First Dance remix	Republic	
Various	May 17, 2020	Digital download; streaming	Live from Paris	Republic	

== See also ==
- List of Billboard Hot 100 top-ten singles in 2019
- List of number-one digital songs of 2019 (U.S.)
- List of top 10 singles in 2019 (Australia)
