= Cornelia Street =

2019 song by Taylor Swift

- Live from Paris cover artwork

Song by Taylor Swift

from the album Lover
- Released: August 23, 2019
- Studio: Electric Lady (New York City)
- Genre: Heartland rock; synth-pop
- Length: 4:47
- Label: Republic
- Songwriter: Taylor Swift
- Producers: Taylor Swift; Jack Antonoff

Audio video
- "Cornelia Street" on YouTube

"Cornelia Street" is a song written and recorded by the American singer-songwriter Taylor Swift for her seventh studio album, Lover (2019). She produced it with Jack Antonoff. The title of the song refers to a street in the New York City neighborhood Greenwich Village, where Swift had rented a townhouse. One of the most personal tracks on Lover, "Cornelia Street" sees Swift pleading to never let her lover go, after having shared the ups and downs during the course of their relationship. The heartland rock and synth-pop song is instrumented by a keyboard line, a delicate piano, and fluttering synthesizers.

Music critics lauded Swift's narrative lyricism in "Cornelia Street" and its sentimental production, with some picking it as an album highlight. The song was included in Uproxx's list of the best songs of 2019. A live version of the song, recorded at the City of Lover concert in Paris in September 2019, was released on digital platforms on May 18, 2020. "Cornelia Street" charted in Australia, Canada, and the United States, and it received certifications in Australia and the United Kingdom.

== Background ==
Taylor Swift released her seventh studio album, Lover, on August 23, 2019, through Republic Records. Described by Swift as a "love letter to love" itself, Lover explores the many feelings evoked by love, inspired by the connections she felt with her fans during her Reputation Stadium Tour (2018). The track list of Lover consists of 18 songs, of which three were solely written by Swift: "Lover", "Cornelia Street", and "Daylight". All three songs were produced by Swift and Jack Antonoff. In an interview with Entertainment Weekly, Swift said that "Cornelia Street" was one of the most personal songs on Lover that were "nearest to her heart". At the City of Lover concert in Paris in September 2019, Swift told her audience that she wrote it in the bathtub, "just for context".

== Music and lyrics ==
"Cornelia Street"
A sample of the song's chorus, which features delicate piano tunes over which Swift sings, "I'd never walk Cornelia Street again", before cascading with falsetto vocals, a synth background and a keyboard line.

At 4 minutes and 47 seconds long, "Cornelia Street" is composed in the I–V–vi–IV progression (C–G–Am–F) and has a tempo of 102 beats per minute. The track is a heartland rock and synth-pop song. It is instrumented by a keyboard line that evokes sounds of a flute, pulsing synths in the background, and echoing, reberbed backing vocals. The rhythm is accentuated by a mix of acoustic drums and programmed snare drums. At the bridge and prechorus, Swift's vocals are accompanied by a delicate piano line. The chorus features Swift singing in her falsetto vocal register for the last four lines.

Lyrically, "Cornelia Street" explores contemplative themes of heartbreak and nostalgia. On Elvis Duran and the Morning Show, Swift explained: "It's about the things that took place and the memories that took place on that street... all the nostalgia. Sometimes we bond our memories to the places that they happen." The title of "Cornelia Street" refers to a street in New York City's Greenwich Village neighborhood, where Swift had rented a townhouse for a short period of time. This is also referenced in the first verse, where Swift sings, "I rent a place on Cornelia Street," which Vulture revealed to be based on Swift's experience hiring the place while her Tribeca residence was being renovated. The townhouse has since been met with extensive coverage in mainstream media and real estate news outlets.

Critics commented that "Cornelia Street" stays true to Swift's narrative songwriting craftsmanship for exploring emotions with intricate details. To demonstrate this viewpoint, Carl Wilson of Slate selected the lyrics: "Windows swung right open, autumn air / Jacket 'round my shoulders is yours / We bless the rains on Cornelia Street / Memorize the creaks in the floor." Throughout the song, imagery of New York City are prevalent—although Swift and her love interest initially share happy moments together, Swift leaves the relationship without saying goodbye as soon as she worries whether her love interest was being honest. As she reaches a tunnel, however, her love interest calls and lures her in again. Years later, she is afraid that she might misstep again and lose him: "That's the kind of heartbreak time won't mend / I'd never walk Cornelia Street again." Wilson thought that the "We bless the rains on Cornelia Street" lyric was a reference to Toto's 1982 song "Africa", and the "tunnel" lyric refers to Lincoln Tunnel, while Mikael Wood of the Los Angeles Times interpreted it as Holland Tunnel.

Vogue compared the song's narrative to that of "All Too Well", a song on Swift's 2012 album Red, for featuring the "same mix of nostalgia for streets crossed together, turning seasons, and relationship highs that make the lows hurt that much more." In a review for Rolling Stone, Rob Sheffield deemed "Cornelia Street" a progression from "Holy Ground", a song also from Red. Both songs depict a girl in New York City, which reminds her of her love interest even before the relationship is over. If "Holy Ground" depicts a relationship that ended in the "usual way", however, "Cornelia Street" is about Swift clinging onto a relationship, pleading not to make the same mistake again.

== Critical reception ==
In publications' reviews of Lover, critics praised "Cornelia Street" for showcasing Swift's songwriting abilities, and some picked it as an album highlight. Writing for The Music, Keira Leonard complimented the personal lyrics and Swift's vocals on delicate piano tunes, which offered "every ounce of emotion". Ben Rayner of The Toronto Star felt that the song exemplified Swift's "real-girl relatability" that shaped her public image and artistry. Although the song initially comes off as generic "21st-century pop", its progression, especially at the bridge where Swift sings "I hope I never lose you" over a delicate piano line, offers emotional engagement. On behalf of Time, Raisa Bruner complimented the song for representing Swift's songwriting abilities, and described the lyrics "I hope I never lose you, hope it never ends / I'd never walk Cornelia Street again" as "a punch of relatability".

Vogue's Jenna Adrian-Diaz observed that the song reflected Swift's personal life at the time, as she was no longer associated with on-and-off relationships that served as an inspiration for her songwriting, but instead retreated her love life from the public eye. Carl Wilson from Slate described the song as the album's best, praising the lyrics for featuring intricate details and showcasing Swift's new perspective on love. Wilson also praised the production for evoking "mixed emotions". Sheffield selected the song as one of the proofs for Swift's songwriting maturity, as she focused on "being in love" rather than failed relationships, which had been a recurring theme. Anna Gaca from Pitchfork lauded the song for offering a contemplative moment: "a lovely, understated tribute to memory and nostalgia with the power to make one rarefied block of Manhattan feel universal".

In a similar sentiment, Vox's Alex Abad-Santos picked "Cornelia Street" as Lover's best song for its relatable lyrics with universal emotions, despite utilizing personal details. Abad-Santos also regarded the song as an extension of Swift's songwriting showcased on "Style" (from Swift's 2014 album 1989) for offering "a sudden, devastating wistfulness for a place or feeling you've never known". Jon Caramanica of The New York Times commented that "Cornelia Street" captures the album's "power". He felt that the song's "atmospheric gloom" was a contrast from Lover's overall bright tunes, and more in line with the production of Swift's 2017 album Reputation, and praised the lyrics for portraying Swift as "coy and lost in reverie". Consequence of Sound similarly considered the song "less cheerful and optimistic" than the overall theme of Lover, and compared it to "New Year's Day", a song off Reputation. Uproxx ranked "Cornelia Street" at number seven on their list of the best songs of 2019, praising Swift's songwriting for offering emotional engagement with "a crafty melody and gentle hand".

== Live performances ==
Swift first performed the song at the City of Lover one-off concert at the Olympia on September 9, 2019, in Paris, France. Swift performed a stripped-down version of the song, backing herself on an acoustic guitar. The concert was filmed and later aired as a TV special on American Broadcasting Company (ABC) on May 17, 2020. The performance of "Cornelia Street" was released for digital download and streaming on May 18, 2020. On August 26, 2023, Swift sang "Cornelia Street" during a Mexico City concert of her sixth headlining concert tour, the Eras Tour (2023–2024). She performed it again on June 13, 2024, as part of a mashup with her song "Maroon" (2022) at a Liverpool concert of the Eras Tour.

== Credits and personnel ==
Credits and personnel are adapted from the liner notes of Lover.

- Taylor Swift – vocals, songwriter, producer
- Jack Antonoff – producer, programming, live drums, keyboards, piano, recording
- Laura Sisk – recording
- John Rooney – recording assistant
- John Hanes – engineer, engineer for mix
- Serban Ghenea – mixing
- Randy Merrill – mastering

== Charts ==
Upon the release of Lover, "Cornelia Street" entered the official singles charts in Australia (ARIA Singles Chart), Canada (Canadian Hot 100), and the United States (Billboard Hot 100). It also entered the UK Streaming Chart, a component chart of the official UK Singles Chart.

Weekly chart performance for "Cornelia Street"
Chart (2019)	Peak position
Australia (ARIA)	40
Canada Hot 100 (Billboard)	51
Singapore (RIAS)	21
UK Audio Streaming (Official Charts)	73
US Billboard Hot 100	57

== Certifications ==
Certifications and sales for "Cornelia Street"
Region	Certification	Certified units/sales
Australia (ARIA)	Platinum	70,000^{‡}
Brazil (Pro-Música Brasil)	Platinum	40,000^{‡}
New Zealand (RMNZ)	Platinum	30,000^{‡}
United Kingdom (BPI)	Silver	200,000^{‡}
^{‡} Sales+streaming figures based on certification alone.

== Release history ==
Release dates and formats for "Cornelia Street"
Region	Date	Format(s)	Version	Label	Ref.
Various	May 18, 2020	Download; streaming	Live from Paris	Republic	
