= New Year's Day (Taylor Swift song) =

2017 single by Taylor Swift

Single by Taylor Swift

from the album Reputation
- Released: November 27, 2017
- Studio: Rough Customers (Brooklyn)
- Length: 3:55
- Label: Big Machine
- Songwriters: Taylor Swift; Jack Antonoff
- Producers: Taylor Swift; Jack Antonoff

Taylor Swift singles chronology
"End Game" (2017)	"New Year's Day" (2017)	"Delicate" (2018)

Audio video
- "New Year's Day" on YouTube

"New Year's Day" is a song by the American singer-songwriter Taylor Swift from her sixth studio album, Reputation (2017). She wrote and produced the song with Jack Antonoff. "New Year's Day" is a sparse acoustic ballad built on recurring piano riffs and subdued guitar and synths. In the lyrics, Swift's narrator spends the morning after a New Year's Eve party with a lover, and they together clean up their shared house and care for each other. Big Machine Records released the song to US country radio as a single on November 27, 2017.

"New Year's Day" received widespread critical acclaim for the intimacy and vulnerability portrayed in its lyrics and simple production. Many critics regarded the song as a standout on Reputation and have considered it one of Swift's best songs. The track charted in the lower-tier ranks on several Billboard charts, including Country Airplay, Hot Country Songs, and Canada Country.

Swift performed "New Year's Day" live on The Tonight Show Starring Jimmy Fallon on November 13, 2017; as part of a medley with her 2010 track "Long Live" on her 2018 Reputation Stadium Tour; and as a "surprise song" four times on her 2023–2024 Eras Tour. "New Year's Day" was interpolated by Olivia Rodrigo in her 2021 song "1 Step Forward, 3 Steps Back".

== Production and writing ==
Taylor Swift wrote and produced "New Year's Day" with Jack Antonoff for her sixth studio album, Reputation (2017). For his recording sessions with Swift, Antonoff encouraged her to capture emotions at a particular time, when "you can feel like you can conquer the world, or you can feel like the biggest piece of garbage that ever existed". He said that "New Year's Day" was the fastest song to complete on Reputation, as the two recorded "scratch takes" that did not filter out unwanted sounds from the outside environment. In an interview with Entertainment Weekly, Antonoff recalled that the recording session was inspired by singer-songwriter Joni Mitchell for capturing emotional honesty: "You don't want to get the perfect tune. You don't want to get the absolute perfect vocal take or the perfect panning or compression. ... It has nothing to do with genre, or how loud or soft it is. You just want the song to feel like itself."

The song was engineered by Laura Sisk at Rough Customer Studio in Brooklyn Heights. It was mixed by Serban Ghenea at MixStar Studios in Virginia Beach, Virginia, and mastered by Randy Merrill at Sterling Sound Studios in New York. The inspiration for the song's lyrics came from a New Year's Eve party at Swift's residence in London. She said, "I was thinking about how everybody talks and thinks about who you kiss at midnight [...] But I think there's something even more romantic about who's gonna deal with you on New Year's Day. Who's willing to give you Advil and clean up the house? I think that states more of a permanence."

== Composition ==
"New Year's Day"
A piano ballad, "New Year's Day" contrasts with Reputation's heavy electronics and talks about the morning after a New Year's Eve party, when Swift and her lover spend time caring for each other.

"New Year's Day" is a piano ballad featuring a stripped-down production incorporating raw piano sounds and occasional guitar and slight synth harmonies, a stark contrast to Reputation's synth-heavy electronic production. Lyrically consistent with Swift's themes of capturing temporary feelings at a particular moment, "New Year's Day" has a setting of a New Year's Eve house party that has just ended. Swift observes, "There's glitter on the floor after the party," as barefoot girls carry their shoes through the lobby, and there is candle wax on the hardwood floor. After all of her friends have gone home, Swift tells her lover, "Don't read the last page, but I stay / When it's hard and it's wrong and we're making mistakes," and confesses that she "wants [your] midnights". Swift sings, "Hold on to the memories, they will hold on to you," and begs for her lover to not "become a stranger whose laugh [she] could recognize anywhere".

== Release and live performances ==
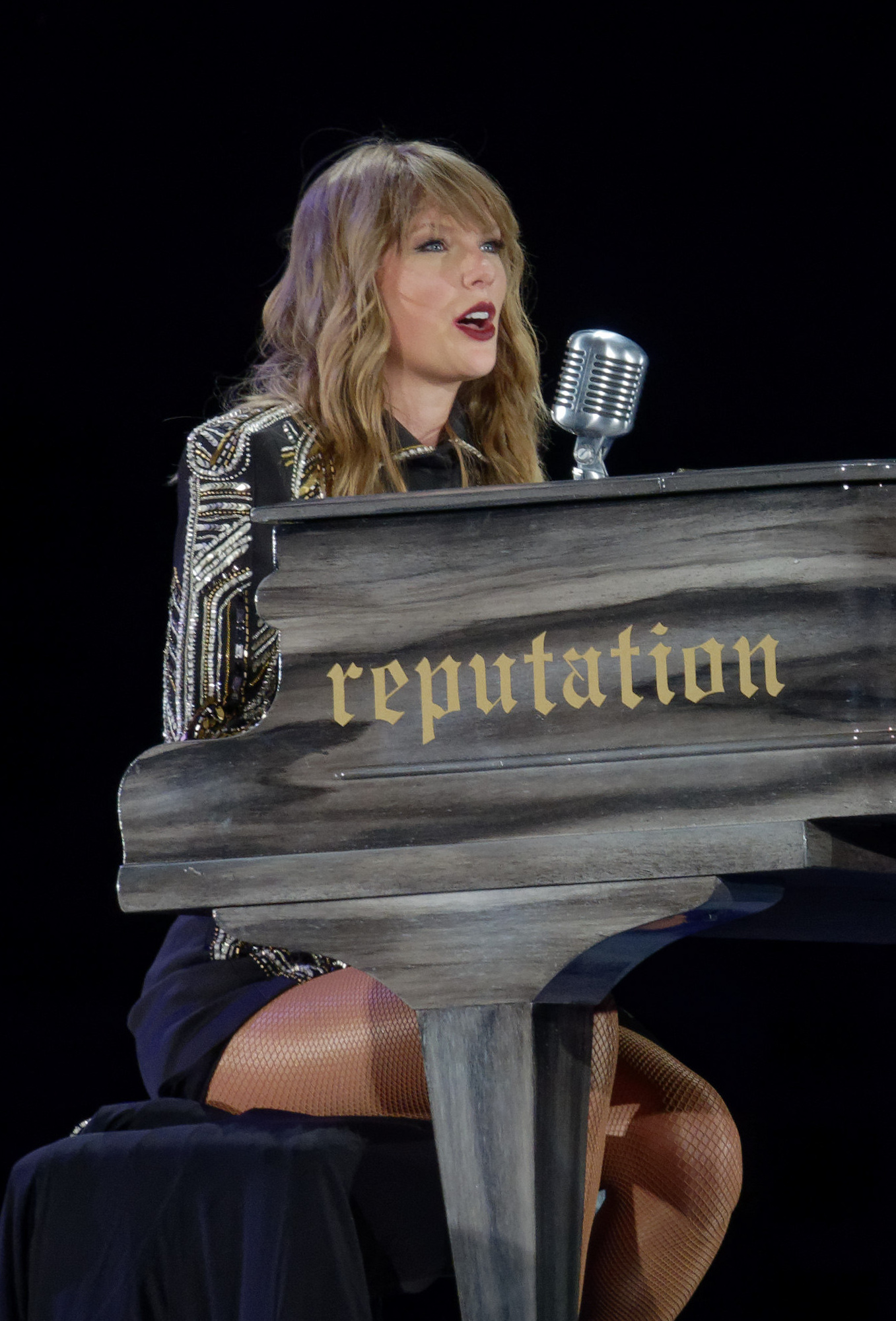
Swift performing "New Year's Day" on the Reputation Stadium Tour (2018)

"New Year's Day" is the last track on the track listing of Reputation, which was released worldwide on November 10, 2017. Prior to the album's release, Swift premiered a recorded live performance of the song on the ABC network during an ad break during the series Scandal, broadcast on November 9, 2017. The performance had taken place at Swift's Holiday House in Watch Hill, Rhode Island in October 2017, as part of a fan-exclusive Reputation album-listening session. On November 13, 2017, Swift performed "New Year's Day" during an episode of The Tonight Show Starring Jimmy Fallon in tribute to host Jimmy Fallon's recently passed mother.

Big Machine Records sent "New Year's Day" to US country radio as a promotional single on November 15, and released it as an official single to US country radio on November 27, 2017, after positive feedback from several country radio stations regarding Swift's performance on the Tonight Show. Reaction to the song's country airplay was mixed, given Swift's announcement that she had abandoned her country roots to embrace mainstream pop in 2014. Radio stations including Chicago's WUSN and Houston's KKBQ, who lobbied to get the song played at their station, were receptive of "New Year's Day". Other country stations were more reserved; a representative of Massachusetts's WBWL commented: "Essentially, I believe that [Swift] has moved on from the country genre ... As she has moved on, our core country listeners have moved on from [Swift], so I'll lay off of it for now. ... and it's not fair to add a pop song when great artists are waiting their turn."

"New Year's Day" was included on the set list of Swift's Reputation Stadium Tour (2018), which she launched in support of Reputation. During the concerts, Swift performed the track as part of a mashup with her song "Long Live" on a piano. On April 23, 2019, she sang the track at the Lincoln Center for the Performing Arts during the Time 100 Gala, where she was honored as one of the "100 most influential people" of the year. On August 9, 2023, Swift performed the song on piano again as a "surprise song" at the last Los Angeles show on her Eras Tour. In the 2024 shows of the tour, she would continue to perform piano renditions of the track as part of mashups; including with "Peace" in Sydney, with "Suburban Legends" in Warsaw, and at the final show of the tour with "Long Live" and "The Manuscript" in Vancouver. The song as well as the last mashup were included in the tour's associated documentary miniseries, Taylor Swift: The End of an Era (2025).

== In popular culture ==
- The American singer-songwriter Olivia Rodrigo interpolated "New Year's Day" in the song "1 Step Forward, 3 Steps Back" from her debut album Sour (2021). Swift and Antonoff were credited as co-writers on the track.
- The song was featured in the 2026 American romantic comedy film Voicemails for Isabelle.

== Critical reception ==
"New Year's Day" received widespread acclaim from contemporary critics, who highlighted its acoustic production which contrasts with the generally synth-heavy production of Reputation, and commended the intricate lyrics. Frank Guan from New York said: "'New Year's Day' isn't the best song on Reputation, but it's one of the best." Guan found the song's theme of vulnerability a much more powerful sentiment than Reputation's themes of vengeance and stardom, saying that Swift was "still an artistic force to be reckoned with". Zach Schonfeld from Newsweek deemed it the best track on Reputation, writing: "It's gorgeous, more so than the song that has that title." Pitchfork's Jamieson Cox praised Swift's songwriting for "[conjuring] rich scenes with just a handful of lines". In a review for Clash, Shahzaib Hussain commended Swift's ability to connect to her audience by expressing "the intimate, diary-like invocation of her past work", a welcoming change from the "high-octane melodrama" of Reputation.

Stephen Thomas Erlewine of AllMusic lauded the song as a high mark against the "monochromatic production" of Reputation for combining "vulnerability, melody, and confidence, but they are deeply felt and complex", which signified Swift's maturity as a singer-songwriter. Writing for Spin, Anna Gacca downplayed Reputation's influences from contemporary hip hop and R&B trends that diminished Swift's authenticity, but found "New Year's Day" to be a welcoming sign of Swift's core as a songwriter: "The Taylor Swift of 'New Year's Day' is ... the sentimentalist who valued songwriting above all else." Gacca also complimented the song's placement as the final track on Reputation for breaking free from the album's themes fueled by the tabloid scrutiny that Swift had experienced. In another review of Reputation for Spin, Jordan Sargent similarly lauded the song for reasserting Swift's authenticity as a songwriter, calling it the album's "most placid, calming note".

BBC Music's Will Gompertz praised the song's production for highlighting Swift's vocals, unburdened by heavy electronics: "you hear a singer who can communicate feeling and thought with touching depth and sincerity." Retrospectively, New York's Nate Jones considered "New Year's Day" the best song on Reputation. Jane Song from Paste noted Swift's lyrical maturity, pointing out similarities between "New Year's Day" and previous songs "Enchanted" and "Mine" from Swift's 2010 album Speak Now. Rob Sheffield of Rolling Stone similarly commented on Swift's maturity: "It captures the romance of mundane domestic details ... This is the kind of song she could keep writing into her forties and fifties." Alex Hopper from American Songwriter viewed the song as a fan-favorite and thought it had a "deeply anthemic melody and searing lyrics".

== Commercial performance ==
"New Year's Day" debuted at number 40 on the Billboard Hot Country Songs chart dated December 9, 2017. It was her 41st chart entry, and her first since her collaboration with Tim McGraw on "Highway Don't Care" in 2013. The same week, it debuted at number five on the Billboard Country Digital Song Sales chart, her 33rd top-ten entry. On the Billboard Country Airplay chart, the single debuted at number 57, her first chart entry since "Shake It Off" (2014). "New Year's Day" later peaked at number 33 and number 41 on the Hot Country Songs and Country Airplay charts, respectively. It peaked at number 44 on the Billboard Digital Song Sales chart. It also peaked on the Billboard Canada Country chart at number 50 and Belgian Flanders's Ultratip Bubbling Under chart at number 33.

== Credits and personnel ==
Credits are adapted from the liner notes of Reputation.

- Taylor Swift – vocals, songwriter, producer
- Jack Antonoff – producer, songwriter, piano, guitar, bass, and synths
- Laura Sisk – engineer
- Serban Ghenea – mixing
- John Hanes – mix engineer
- Randy Merrill – mastering

== Charts ==
Chart performance for "New Year's Day"
Chart (2017–2018)	Peak position
Belgium (Ultratip Bubbling Under Flanders)	33
Canada Country (Billboard)	50
US Hot Country Songs (Billboard)	33
US Country Airplay (Billboard)	41
US Digital Song Sales (Billboard)	44

== Certifications ==
Certifications for "New Year's Day"
Region	Certification	Certified units/sales
Australia (ARIA)	Platinum	70,000^{‡}
New Zealand (RMNZ)	Gold	15,000^{‡}
United Kingdom (BPI)	Silver	200,000^{‡}
^{‡} Sales+streaming figures based on certification alone.
