= Fresh Out the Slammer =

2024 song by Taylor Swift

Song by Taylor Swift

from the album The Tortured Poets Department
- Released: April 19, 2024
- Studio: Conway Recording (Los Angeles); Electric Lady (New York); Esplanade (New Orleans)
- Genre: Western; country rock; country pop
- Length: 3:30
- Label: Republic
- Songwriters: Taylor Swift; Jack Antonoff
- Producers: Taylor Swift; Jack Antonoff

Lyric video
- "Fresh Out the Slammer" on YouTube

"Fresh Out the Slammer" is a song by the American singer-songwriter Taylor Swift from her eleventh studio album, The Tortured Poets Department (2024). Written and produced by Swift and Jack Antonoff, the song is a Western, country pop, and country rock composition featuring twangy guitars and looping synths. Lyrically, the song's narrator contemplates on how she felt trapped in a past relationship, which she compares to a prison, and used another romantic interest to rebound.

Several critics were fascinated by the song's hazy production, stylistic instrumentation, and the storytelling lyrics, while few others found the track overwritten. "Fresh Out the Slammer" peaked at number 15 on the Billboard Global 200 and reached the top 20 of charts in Australia, Canada, New Zealand, and the United States. In 2024, Swift performed the song live twice on her sixth concert tour, the Eras Tour.

== Background and release ==
Swift started working on The Tortured Poets Department immediately after she submitted her tenth studio album, Midnights, to Republic Records for release in 2022. She continued working on it in secrecy throughout the US leg of the Eras Tour in 2023. The album's conception took place when Swift's personal life continued to be a widely covered topic in the press: her six-year relationship with Joe Alwyn and short-lived romantic linking with Matty Healy were heavily publicized. She described The Tortured Poets Department as her "lifeline" album which she "really needed" to make. Republic Records released it on April 19, 2024; "Fresh Out the Slammer" is seventh on the track list.

In 2024, Swift performed "Fresh Out the Slammer" twice on her sixth concert tour, the Eras Tour. At the concert in Lisbon, Portugal, on May 24, she performed the song as part of a mashup with "High Infidelity" from Midnights (2022) on piano. She sang the track again as part of a guitar mashup with "You Are in Love" from 1989 (2014) at the concert in Munich, Germany, on July 27.

== Music and lyrics ==
"Fresh Out the Slammer"
"Fresh Out the Slammer" combines western and country, incorporating twangy guitars, looping synthesizers, and a hazy atmosphere.

Swift wrote and produced "Fresh Out the Slammer" with Jack Antonoff. At 3 minutes and 30 seconds long, the song incorporates styles associated with Americana music such as western, country rock, and country pop, with strong influences of country, dream pop, and old-time music. Its balladic production features a dense arrangement of electric guitars played with tremolo and spring reverb, acoustic guitar strums, crossstick-played acoustic snare drums, electric organs, and pulsing synths. The second verse incorporates a programmed string section, leading to the bridge that also serves as the outro. Starting at 2 minutes and 25 seconds, the outro features a tempo drop from 88 to 75 beats per minute, with a different rhythmic programming.

Critics described the soundscape as twangy and hazy; the music writers Damien Somville and Marine Benoit wrote that the atmospheric intro of tremolo guitars evoked "the great American plains". The critic Annie Zaleski compared the production of "Fresh Out the Slammer" to that of "Cowboy like Me" from Swift's 2020 album Evermore, writing that both tracks feature a "desolate, cowboys-duel-at-dawn vibe" with "dusty, twangy riffs" and "a loping tempo". There were comparisons of the guitar tones to the music of Orville Peck. The Times' Dan Cairns characterized the genre as "pop-noir" reminiscent of the music by Lana Del Rey.

In the lyrics, a female narrator escapes from an intoxicating relationship. They heavily use clipped phrasings and internal rhymes ("Camera flashes, welcome bashes, get the matches, toss the ashes off the ledge"), which Swift sings with a "bouncy" cadence, according to Lindsay Zoladz of The New York Times. The first verse details the end of a previous relationship before Swift's narrator enters another: "Now, pretty baby, I'm running back home to you/ Fresh out the slammer, I know who my first call will be to." The first refrain relates that past relationship to jail time: the narrator felt that she was stuck in an endless cycle of catering to the ex-lover's needs and keeping her sanity ("Years of labor, locks, and ceilings/ In the shade of how he was feeling/ But it's gonna be alright, I did my time"). In the final lines, Swift's character dreams about being the "girl of his American Dream" to the other man and reminisces about their memories. Rob Sheffield thought that the song contains imagery inspired by the novel The Great Gatsby (1925).

The lyrical imagery of being held in prison is exemplary of the many similar sentiments about mental health throughout other tracks on the album. Several critics interpreted the song to be about a rebound; Beats Per Minute's John Wohlmacher thought that the lyric, "Swirled you into all of my poems", suggested that Swift had written about the same man in some previous songs. For Billboard's Jason Lipshutz, the songwriting in "Fresh Out the Slammer" embodies free association that differs from the more structural songwriting elsewhere in the album. "Fresh Out the Slammer" ends with a coda that has a different tempo than the rest of the song. According to American Songwriter's Alex Hopper, the track separates the two relationships through both the lyrics and the melodic change, hinting at how "[Swift] feels about them instantly".

== Critical reception ==
There were mixed critical opinions about "Fresh Out the Slammer". In a positive review, Wohlmacher thought that the lyrics were "emotionally revealing" and the sound was "breezy and a nice listen, all sensual anticipation". Maria Sherman of the Associated Press praised the tone of the guitars and called the production "wind-blown". SLUG's Palak Jayswal and The Arts Desk's Ellie Roberts contended that the track was one of the album highlights; the latter considered "Fresh Out the Slammer" a thematic transition between the gradual end of a relationship in "So Long, London" and the sudden, violent occurrence of a new romantic fling in "The Smallest Man Who Ever Lived". Commenting on the lyrics and theme, Callie Ahlgrim of Business Insider summed up the song as "a fascinating tale of freedom and lust". Sheffield wrote that although the track was "easy to overlook at first" because of its "understated" and "[not] hyperdramatic" qualities, it turned out to be a "sneakily durable gauze-rocker with heist-flick guitar twang".

On a less enthusiastic side, Konstantinos Pappis of Our Culture Mag called the track "slumbering" that could not keep his attention. Zoladz thought that the lyrical imagery of prison was too much and the tight internal rhymes were suffocating. Paste's Grace Byron described the melodic change in the song as "bizarre" and described the track as one of the album's "snoozers". Lipshutz ranked the song 23rd out of the entire 31 tracks of The Tortured Poets Department: The Anthology, saying that it serves "more as connective tissue" in-between the album's more "towering moments".

== Commercial performance ==
Upon the release of The Tortured Poets Department, "Fresh Out the Slammer" peaked at number 15 on the Billboard Global 200. In the United States, "Fresh Out the Slammer" debuted at its peak of number 11 on the Billboard Hot 100. The song alongside 13 tracks from the album made Swift the first artist to monopolize the top 14 of the Hot 100. In Australia, the track peaked at number 14 on the ARIA Singles Chart and was certified gold by the Australian Recording Industry Association. The song peaked within the top 40 of singles charts in New Zealand (15), Canada (16), the Philippines (22), and Portugal (33).

== Credits and personnel ==
Credits adapted from the liner notes of The Tortured Poets Department

Studios

- Recorded at Conway Recording Studios, Los Angeles; Electric Lady Studios, New York City; Esplanade Studios, New Orleans
- Taylor Swift's lead vocals recorded at Electric Lady Studios, New York City; Prime Recording, Nashville
- Mixed at MixStar Studios, Virginia Beach, Virginia
- Mastered at Sterling Sound, Edgewater, New Jersey
- Mastered for vinyl at Sterling Sound, Nashville

Musicians and technicians

- Taylor Swift – lead vocals, songwriter, producer
- Jack Antonoff – producer, songwriter, programming, acoustic guitar, drums, electric guitar, organ, percussion, synthesizer, DX7, M1
- Oli Jacobs – recording
- Christopher Rowe – lead vocals recording
- Laura Sisk – recording, lead vocals recording
- Jesse Solon Snider – assistant engineer
- Jack Manning – assistant engineer
- Jon Sher – engineer
- Bryce Bordone – engineer for mix
- Serban Ghenea – mixing
- Randy Merrill – mastering

== Charts ==
Chart performance
Chart (2024)	Peak position
Australia (ARIA)	14
Canada Hot 100 (Billboard)	16
Czech Republic Singles Digital (ČNS IFPI)	80
France (SNEP)	115
Global 200 (Billboard)	15
Greece International (IFPI)	35
Lithuania (AGATA)	79
New Zealand (Recorded Music NZ)	15
Slovakia Singles Digital (ČNS IFPI)	93
Philippines (Billboard)	22
Portugal (AFP)	33
Sweden (Sverigetopplistan)	51
Swiss Streaming (Schweizer Hitparade)	35
UK Streaming (OCC)	18
US Billboard Hot 100	11

== Certifications ==
Certification for "Fresh Out the Slammer"
Region	Certification	Certified units/sales
Australia (ARIA)	Gold	35,000^{‡}
Brazil (Pro-Música Brasil)	Platinum	40,000^{‡}
New Zealand (RMNZ)	Gold	15,000^{‡}
United Kingdom (BPI)	Silver	200,000^{‡}
^{‡} Sales+streaming figures based on certification alone.
