= Vigilante Shit =

2022 song by Taylor Swift

Song by Taylor Swift

from the album Midnights
- Released: October 21, 2022
- Studio: Rough Customer (Brooklyn); Electric Lady (New York)
- Genre: Dark pop; trip hop
- Length: 2:44
- Label: Republic
- Songwriter: Taylor Swift
- Producers: Taylor Swift; Jack Antonoff

Lyric video
- "Vigilante Shit" on YouTube

"Vigilante Shit" is a song written and recorded by the American singer-songwriter Taylor Swift for her tenth studio album, Midnights (2022). Produced by Swift and Jack Antonoff, the track is a dark pop and trip hop tune with elements of industrial and hip-hop. Its minimalistic production is driven by trap beats composed of pulsing snare drums, light bass, swirling synths, and electronic tones. The lyrics, described by critics as "noirish", depict a declaration of vengeance: Swift's narrator takes aim at an enemy and encourages other women to do the same.

Critics praised "Vigilante Shit" for its dark, minimalist production; several reviewers described its theme of vengeance and its hip-hop-influenced production as a more sophisticated continuation of Swift's Reputation (2017). In the United States, the song peaked at number 10 on the Billboard Hot 100; it additionally entered the Global 200 at number nine and reached the top 10 on music charts in Australia, Canada, Greece, and the Philippines. It was included on the set list of Swift's sixth headlining concert tour, the Eras Tour (2023–2024).

== Background and release ==
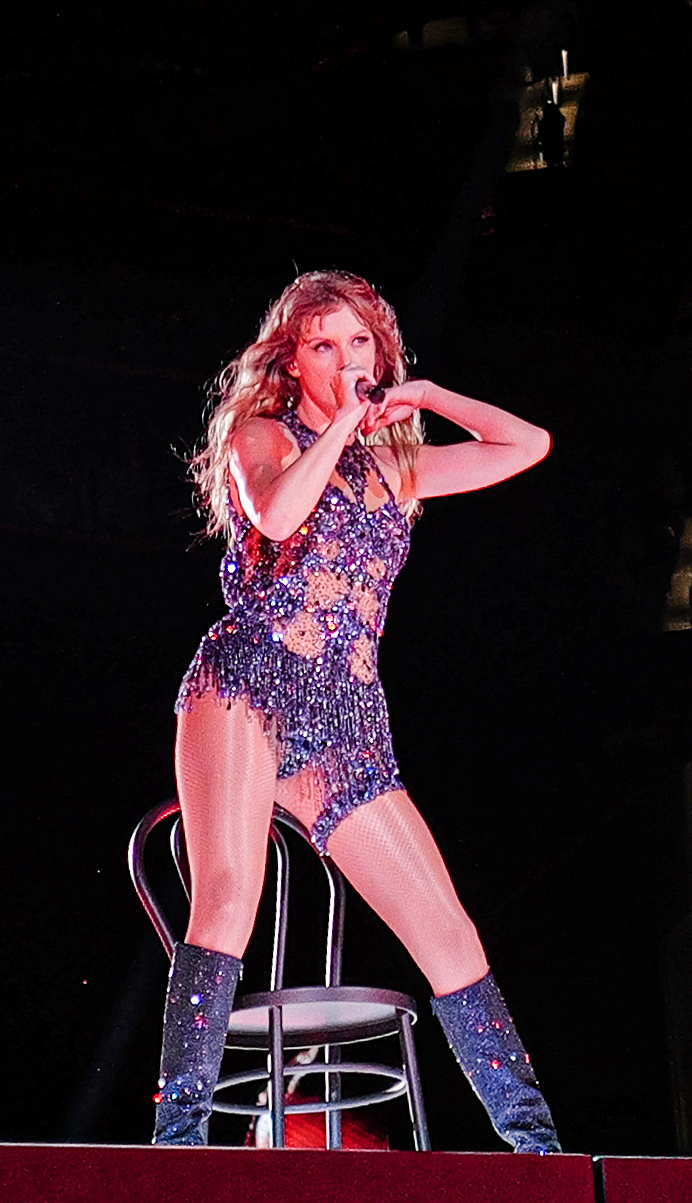
Swift performing "Vigilante Shit" at the Eras Tour (2023)

On August 28, 2022, Swift announced her tenth studio album, Midnights, set for release on October 21, 2022. The track-list was not immediately revealed. Jack Antonoff, a longtime collaborator of Swift who had worked with her since 1989 (2014), was confirmed as a producer on Midnights by a video posted to Swift's Instagram account on September 16, 2022. On September 21, 2022, Swift began unveiling the track-list in a randomized order through her 13-episode short video series on TikTok, called Midnights Mayhem with Me. In each episode, Swift rolls a lottery cage containing 13 ping pong balls numbered from one to thirteen, each representing a track of Midnights, and when a ball drops out, she disclosed the title of the corresponding track on the album, through a telephone. In the second episode, released on September 23, 2022, Swift announced "Vigilante Shit" would be track eight. The song, along with the rest of Midnights, was released on October 21, 2022, under Republic Records.

"Vigilante Shit" was included on the set list of Swift's sixth headlining concert tour, the Eras Tour (2023–24), as part of the Midnights act. The performance is a burlesque chair dance that resembles 1975 musical Chicago; the performance went viral on social media and critics highlighted it as a standout moment of the concert.

== Composition and lyrics ==
Swift wrote "Vigilante Shit" alone and produced it with Antonoff. At 2 minutes and 44 seconds, it is the shortest track on the album's standard edition. "Vigilante Shit" is a dark pop and trip hop track. The song is written in the key of A minor with a tempo of 80 beats per minute. Swift's vocals span from F_{3} to A_{4}. The minimalist production is built on a trap beat consisting of pulsing snare drums, light bass, and electronic tones. It incorporates swirling synths and elements of industrial and hip-hop. Writing for The Independent, Helen Brown described "Vigilante Shit" as a noirish rap. Meanwhile, The New York Times' Jon Caramanica called it an "electro-cabaret exhale". USA Today's Melissa Ruggieri said that the song's minor chords and "theatrical chorus" contribute to a "noir ambiance". Other critics compared the moody production to that of Lorde's Pure Heroine (2013) and Billie Eilish's When We All Fall Asleep, Where Do We Go? (2019).

Lyrically, "Vigilante Shit" is a revenge fantasy told by a sneering narrator who recruits her lover's ex-wife to join the narrator's plot. The lyrics describe an envelope handed to an ex-wife who is now driving her ex-lover's Mercedes-Benz. The song's final verse concludes referencing the antagonist's cocaine use: "While he was doing lines / And crossing all of mine / Someone told his white collar crimes to the FBI." Some music critics theorized that the lyrics were a reference to either Swift's feuds with the rapper Kanye West or the talent manager Scooter Braun, whose purchase of the masters for her first six albums created a highly publicized dispute. "Vigilante Shit" was described as a more direct response to the dispute, building on her previous songs "My Tears Ricochet" and "Mad Woman", both from Folklore (2020). Various critics drew lyrical parallels to Swift's sixth studio album, Reputation (2017), which focused heavily on scrutiny directed towards Swift and public feuds with figures like West. (Note: Attributed to Billboard's Jason Lipshutz, Vulture's Justin Curto, Clash's, Matthew Neale, PopMatters' Rick Quinn, The Observer's Kitty Empire, and Slate Magazine's Paul Attard)

== Critical reception ==
Critics lauded the vengeful lyrics and production of "Vigilante Shit". Variety's Chris Willman lauded the track's production and lyrics, predicting it would be the album's "most talked-about song." Clash's Mattew Neale called the track "utterly irresistible." Along with "Karma", "Vigilante Shit" was praised by Rolling Stone's Brittany Spanos and The Guardian's Alexis Petridis for creating an intriguing energy on Midnights. Both American Songwriter's Alex Hopper and PopMatters' Rick Quinn lauded Swift for not sugarcoating her desire for vengeance. Lucy Habron of Gigwise praised the purposeful decisions made on the track, comparing Swift's musical experimentation to that of Prince. Helen Brown of The Independent lauded the lyrical details and "classy-sharp wordplay" of "Vigilante Shit" as conjuring a vivid image of the track's storyline.

In a warm review of Midnights published in The New York Times, Jon Caramanica considered the song as the album's high point, describing Swift's self-characterization as "funny, wry, [and] slightly perturbing." Paul Attard of Slant praised the song's extreme but reserved approach towards the theme of vengeance, particularly directing acclaim towards its production. Justin Curto, writing for Vulture, called "Vigilante Shit" Swift's "venomous best." Curto highlighted Swift's wordplay and confidence on the track as powerful and an improvement from the thematically similar Reputation (2017). In his ranking of the standard edition of Midnights, Billboard's Jason Lipshultz named "Vigilante Shit" the album's second-best track, directing acclaim towards its "stripped-down [...] cutthroat approach" towards years of built-up anger.

In a less enthusiastic review, Pitchfork's Quinn Moreland claimed Swift's "edginess" was less convincing than her previous work. Carl Wilson, writing for Slate, felt "Vigilante Shit" was a disposable track but also was a more sophisticated take than similar vengeance songs in her previous albums.

== Commercial performance ==
Globally, "Vigilante Shit" received over 11.8 million streams on Spotify in its first 24 hours, becoming the seventh-most streamed song on that day, following six other songs from Midnights. It debuted and peaked at number nine on the Spotify Weekly Top Songs chart, where it charted for six weeks.

Upon the release of Midnights, 10 of its tracks debuted in the top 10 of the United States' Billboard Hot 100, making Swift the first and only artist to occupy the entire top 10 of the Hot 100. "Vigilante Shit" opened at number 10, accumulating 32.2 million streams, 6,400 digital downloads, and 424,000 airplay impressions. "Vigilante Shit" spent six weeks on the Hot 100. It also charted at number seven on the international singles chart in Greece; nine on the Billboard Global 200, Canada, and the Philippines; and number 10 in Australia and Malaysia. It peaked within the top 25 of singles charts in Portugal, Iceland, Vietnam, Luxembourg, and South Africa; and on the international singles chart in India. The song received certifications from Australia (double platinum), Canada (gold), and the United Kingdom (gold).

== Credits and personnel ==
Credits are adapted from the liner notes of Midnights.

Recording

- Recorded at Rough Customer Studio, Brooklyn and Electric Lady Studios, New York City
- Mixed at MixStar Studios, Virginia Beach
- Mastered at Sterling Sound, Edgewater, New Jersey
- Evan Smith's performance was recorded by herself at Pleasure Hill Recording, Portland, Maine
- Dominik Rivinius' performance was recorded by Ken Lewis at Neon Wave Studio, Pirmasens, Germany

Personnel

- Taylor Swift – vocals, songwriting, production
- Jack Antonoff – production, engineering, programming, synths, percussion, juno 6, wurlitzer, Moog, recording
- Evan Smith – engineering, synths
- Dominik Rivinius – drums
- Laura Sisk – engineering, recording
- Ken Lewis – engineering
- Megan Searl – assistant engineering
- John Sher – assistant engineering
- John Rooney – assistant engineering
- Jonathan Garcia – assistant engineering
- Serban Ghenea – mixing
- Bryce Bordone – assistant mixing
- Randy Merrill – mastering

== Charts ==
Chart performance
Chart (2022)	Peak position
Australia (ARIA)	10
Canada Hot 100 (Billboard)	9
France (SNEP)	133
Global 200 (Billboard)	9
Greece International (IFPI)	7
Hungary (Stream Top 40)	40
Iceland (Tónlistinn)	17
India International Singles (IMI)	20
Luxembourg (Billboard)	24
Malaysia (Billboard)	18
Malaysia International (RIM)	10
Philippines (Billboard)	9
Portugal (AFP)	12
South Africa (RISA)	24
Spain (Promusicae)	63
Sweden (Sverigetopplistan)	41
Swiss Streaming (Schweizer Hitparade)	39
UK Audio Streaming (Official Charts)	9
US Billboard Hot 100	10
Vietnam Hot 100 (Billboard)	18

== Certifications ==
Certifications for "Vigilante Shit"
Region	Certification	Certified units/sales
Australia (ARIA)	2× Platinum	140,000^{‡}
Brazil (Pro-Música Brasil)	Gold	20,000^{‡}
Canada (Music Canada)	Gold	40,000^{‡}
New Zealand (RMNZ)	Platinum	30,000^{‡}
United Kingdom (BPI)	Gold	400,000^{‡}
^{‡} Sales+streaming figures based on certification alone.
