= So Long, London =

2024 song by Taylor Swift

Song by Taylor Swift

from the album The Tortured Poets Department
- Released: April 19, 2024
- Studio: Long Pond (New York)
- Genre: Downtempo; chamber pop; synth-pop
- Length: 4:22
- Label: Republic
- Songwriters: Taylor Swift; Aaron Dessner
- Producers: Taylor Swift; Aaron Dessner

Lyric video
- "So Long, London" on YouTube

"So Long, London" is a song by the American singer-songwriter Taylor Swift from her eleventh studio album, The Tortured Poets Department (2024). She wrote and produced the track with Aaron Dessner. A downtempo chamber pop and synth-pop tune, "So Long, London" is set over to 4/4 house beats and has a piano and synthesizer instrumentation. Its lyrical content concerns a failed romance and explores a narrator processing the fallout and its aftermath.

In reviews of The Tortured Poets Department, a number of critics picked "So Long, London" as a highlight and applauded the heartbreaking lyrics and Swift's songwriting, but a few others found it lyrically uninventive. The track peaked at number four on the Billboard Global 200 and charted within the top 10 in many countries. It has been certified double platinum in Brazil, and platinum in Australia and New Zealand.

== Background and release ==
Taylor Swift started working on The Tortured Poets Department immediately after she submitted her tenth studio album, Midnights, to Republic Records for release in 2022. She continued working on it in secrecy throughout the US leg of the Eras Tour in 2023. The album's conception took place around the time the media reported that Swift's six-year relationship with the English actor Joe Alwyn had ended. She described it as her "lifeline" album which she "really needed" to make. Republic Records released The Tortured Poets Department on April 19, 2024; it was her ninth album release within the last five years. Track five on the album, "So Long, London", received particular fan interest prior to the album's release, because Swift had said that each of her albums' track five was its most vulnerable and emotionally intense. On August 20, 2024, Swift performed an acoustic version of "So Long, London" at the final London show of the Eras Tour.

== Music and lyrics ==
"So Long, London"
A sample of the intro of "So Long, London", featuring Swift's multitracked vocals before proceeding with 4/4 house beats and synths

Swift wrote and produced "So Long, London" with Aaron Dessner. The track is 4 minutes and 22 seconds long. It opens with Swift's multitracked vocals singing the title a cappella, which received comparisons to sounds of a church choir against the ringing bells that are typical of London. The song progresses into a downtempo arrangement, set to a bass drum beat at 160 beats per minute and supported by a pulsating synth sequence, while the rest of the arrangement and Swift's vocals are arranged on a tempo of 80 beats per minute.

The song's genre is chamber pop and synth-pop, and the beats display influences of house music. There are occasional accents of soft piano and distant vocal harmonies that Billboard's Jason Lipshutz described as "ghostly". Samantha Olson of Cosmopolitan compared the beat's "heartbeat feel" to Swift's past songs "Wildest Dreams" (2014) and "You're Losing Me" (2023), while Sinéad O'Sullivan of The New Yorker wrote that the production exhibited some elements from "Call It What You Want" or "Dress", songs from Swift's 2017 album Reputation. Alexis Petridis of The Guardian wrote that the production builds up to a "climax that never actually comes", while Laura Snapes of the same newspaper described the synth sounds as "trembling".

In the lyrics, the narrator details a love gone wrong. The ex-partner is portrayed as cold and disinterested ("Every breath feels like rarest air when you're not sure if he wants to be there"), and the narrator laments, "You left me at the house by the Heath" / "You sacrificed us to the gods of your bluest days", referencing the London area of Hampstead Heath. They portray Swift's character carrying "the weight of the rift", her "white-knuckle dying grip holding to your quiet resentment", and her resentment ("I'm pissed off you let me give you all that youth for free"). She tries to save the relationship to no avail. After processing the aftermath of a breakup, she bids goodbye to a partner and a community she once considered home. The verses, although set to a 4/4 time signature, contain continuous triplets that slice each measure into a feel of a 12/8 time signature ("I stopped trying to make him laugh, stopped trying to drill the safe", "And I'm pissed off you let me give you all that youth for free / For so long, London").

The narrator eventually abandons the relationship with the lyric, "I stopped CPR, after all it's no use / The spirit was gone, we would never come to"; Alyssa Bailey of Elle and Mehera Bonner of Cosmopolitan contended that it was a reference to "You're Losing Me". By the song's conclusion, Swift accepts her reality: "So long, London/ Had good run/ A moment of warm sun/ But I'm not the one". Bailey and Elena Nicolaou of Today.com, thought that the lyrics alluded to Swift's breakup with Alwyn. Olson and Pitchfork's Shaad D'Souza described the track as an antithesis to "London Boy" (2019), a track about Swift's infatuation for an Englishman.

== Critical reception ==
Some critics contended that the track was emotionally heartbreaking and picked it as one of the best tracks on The Tortured Poets Department. Will Hodgkinson of The Times gave the song a five-star rating and wrote: "Heartfelt, tender and poetic, this is a real tearjerker." Neil McCormick from The Daily Telegraph described the track as a "sumptuously sad and gorgeous, lyrically forensic dissection of a fading romance". Hunter-Tilney and the BBC's Mark Savage acclaimed the track as one of the best songs Swift had released; the former praised how Swift recounts a doomed love affair "with sorrow and coiled anger", and the latter deemed it as being "up there with the best things [Swift has] ever written". Lipshutz ranked "So Long, London" fourth out of the 31 tracks on the double album edition, describing the lyrics as "raw honesty".

Other critics commented on the production. Hunter-Tilney found it to be a "beautifully chilly electronic landscape", and The Irish Times's Finn McRedmond praised Swift's vocals for having "an irresistible buttery quality" and thought they were best utilized in a lower vocal register. Mesfin Fekadu from The Hollywood Reporter highlighted the "soft, electropop beat". Olson picked "So Long, London" among the five best album tracks, highlighting both the heartbreaking lyrics and the relenting production. Josh Kurp from Uproxx said it was a "chilling addition to the track five canon".

Less enthusiastic reviews opined that "So Long, London" was lyrically uninventive. The Scotsman's Fiona Shepherd praised the "tasteful beats" but said that the song "succumbed to same old tame old business as usual". Mary Kate from The A. V. Club opined that the "CPR" imagery was repetitive from "You're Losing Me", but arguing that "this wouldn't be a detriment" had Swift allowed for more time between her "hyperproductivity" with successive album releases. Pitchfork's Olivia Horn thought that the lyrics used ineffective metaphors such as the "five different causes of death". Grace Byron of Paste said the song's chorus lacked the emotions Swift normally showcases but thought that it was one of the better-produced song on the album.

== Commercial performance ==
When the album was released, nine of its tracks occupied the top 10 of the Billboard Global 200; "So Long, London" debuted and peaked at number four on the chart, where it extended Swift's top-10 entries to 33. In the United States, the track opened at its peak of number five on the Billboard Hot 100. The song alongside 13 tracks from the album made Swift the first artist to monopolize the top 14 of the Hot 100. In Australia, "So Long, London" reached number four on the ARIA Singles Chart and made her the artist with the most entries in a single week with 29.

Elsewhere, "So Long, London" reached the top 10 in several countries: number five in New Zealand and Canada, number seven in Ireland, number eight in Luxembourg, the Philippines, Portugal, Singapore, Sweden, and the United Arab Emirates, and number 10 in Malaysia. In the Middle East and North Africa (MENA) region, the track peaked at number 10. The song also charted within the top 20 in Denmark (11), Switzerland (11), Norway (12), Latvia (14), South Africa (15), Iceland (16), and Croatia (17). It has been certified double platinum in Brazil, and platinum in Australia and New Zealand.

== Personnel ==
- Taylor Swift – vocals, songwriter, producer
- Aaron Dessner – producer, songwriter, recording engineer, drum programming, electric guitar, piano, synth
- Serban Ghenea – mixing
- Bryce Bordone – mix engineer
- Jonathan Low – recording engineer
- Bella Blasko – recording engineer
- Benjamin Lanz – synth, synth recording
- Randy Merrill – mastering

== Charts ==
Chart performance
| Chart (2024) | Peak position |
|---|---|
| Argentina Hot 100 (Billboard) | 52 |
| Australia (ARIA) | 4 |
| Belgium (Ultratop 50 Flanders) | 40 |
| Brazil Hot 100 (Billboard) | 51 |
| Canada Hot 100 (Billboard) | 5 |
| Croatia (Billboard) | 17 |
| Czech Republic Singles Digital (ČNS IFPI) | 30 |
| Denmark (Tracklisten) | 11 |
| Finland (Suomen virallinen lista) | 39 |
| France (SNEP) | 51 |
| Global 200 (Billboard) | 4 |
| Greece International (IFPI) | 9 |
| Hong Kong (Billboard) | 21 |
| Iceland (Tónlistinn) | 16 |
| India International (IMI) | 8 |
| Indonesia (Billboard) | 25 |
| Italy (FIMI) | 83 |
| Latvia (LaIPA) | 14 |
| Lithuania (AGATA) | 28 |
| Luxembourg (Billboard) | 8 |
| Malaysia (Billboard) | 13 |
| Malaysia International (RIM) | 10 |
| MENA (IFPI) | 10 |
| Netherlands (Single Top 100) | 34 |
| New Zealand (Recorded Music NZ) | 5 |
| Norway (VG-lista) | 12 |
| Philippines (Billboard) | 8 |
| Poland (Polish Streaming Top 100) | 41 |
| Portugal (AFP) | 8 |
| Singapore (RIAS) | 8 |
| Slovakia Singles Digital (ČNS IFPI) | 32 |
| South Africa (TOSAC) | 15 |
| Spain (Promusicae) | 45 |
| Sweden (Sverigetopplistan) | 8 |
| Switzerland (Schweizer Hitparade) | 11 |
| UAE (IFPI) | 8 |
| UK Singles Sales (OCC) | 79 |
| UK Streaming (OCC) | 7 |
| US Billboard Hot 100 | 5 |

== Certifications ==
Certifications for "So Long, London"
| Region | Certification | Certified units/sales |
|---|---|---|
| Australia (ARIA) | Platinum | 70,000^{‡} |
| Brazil (Pro-Música Brasil) | 2× Platinum | 80,000^{‡} |
| New Zealand (RMNZ) | Platinum | 30,000^{‡} |
| United Kingdom (BPI) | Gold | 400,000^{‡} |
^{‡} Sales+streaming figures based on certification alone.
