= Mastermind (song) =

2022 song by Taylor Swift

Song by Taylor Swift

from the album Midnights
- Released: October 21, 2022
- Studio: Rough Customer (Brooklyn); Electric Lady (New York City)
- Genre: Electropop; synth-pop
- Length: 3:11
- Label: Republic
- Songwriters: Taylor Swift; Jack Antonoff
- Producers: Taylor Swift; Jack Antonoff

Lyric video
- "Mastermind" on YouTube

"Mastermind" is a song by the American singer-songwriter Taylor Swift from her tenth original studio album, Midnights (2022). She wrote and produced the track with Jack Antonoff. An electropop and synth-pop song, "Mastermind" features synth arpeggiators, layered vocal harmonies, an expansive bass, and subtle orchestration in the refrains. Inspired by the 2017 film Phantom Thread, the lyrics are about a calculating woman: Swift's narrator confesses to her lover that she was the one who initiated and planned their romantic relationship.

Music critics generally praised "Mastermind" for its production and Swift's songwriting. The track peaked at number 13 on the Billboard Global 200 and the top 20 on national charts in Australia, Canada, Malaysia, the Philippines, Singapore, and the United States. It has received certifications in Australia, Brazil, Canada, New Zealand, and the United Kingdom. Swift performed the song on the Eras Tour (2023–2024).

== Background and production ==
The American singer-songwriter Taylor Swift announced her tenth studio album, Midnights, at the 2022 MTV Video Music Awards on August 28. On a video via her Instagram account on September 6, 2022, titled "The making of Midnights", Swift revealed that Jack Antonoff, who had worked with her before on her five studio albums since 1989 (2014), was a producer on the album. Starting from September 21, 2022, exactly a month before Midnights' release, she announced a thirteen-episode short series called Midnights Mayhem with Me on the social media platform TikTok. The series' purpose is to announce a song title every episode by rolling a lottery cage containing thirteen ping pong balls numbered one to thirteen, each ball representing a track. "Mastermind" was the first track title Swift revealed.

Swift wrote and produced "Mastermind" with Antonoff. At 3 minutes and 11 seconds long, "Mastermind" is a subdued electropop and synth-pop song, with prominent synth-pop hooks. Set over four on the floor beats, the track features an electronic groove, swirling synth arpeggiators, an expansive bass, and layered vocal harmonies. The bridge and refrains feature subtle orchestration of strings. Ilana Kaplan from the Alternative Press compared the opening synths to the "jittery" introduction of the Who's song "Baba O'Riley" (1971), while Billboard's Andrew Unterberger described the synth arpeggiators as reminiscent of OMD and the track's beat as "a racing heartbeat".

== Lyrics ==
"Mastermind" is about reflecting upon one's romantic relationship and declaring that the protagonist is the mastermind behind everything that happened. Swift revealed in a 2023 cover story with Time journalist Sam Lansky that she was inspired to write the song after watching the 2017 film Phantom Thread. The song opens, "Once upon a time, the planets and the fates and all the stars aligned/ You and I ended up in the same room at the same time". Time critics interpreted this part as a throwback to Swift's 2008 single "Love Story"—both songs reference William Shakespeare's trope of star-crossed lovers but with contrary effects. Throughout the verses, Swift's character paints herself as the grandmaster scheming a plan to "assess the equation of you". In the refrain, the narrator asserts that "none of it was accidental" and proclaims themselves as the person responsible for everything that happened, "What if I told you I'm a mastermind? And now you're mine/ It was all by design." For some critics, these lyrics contrast with the theme of love guided by fate and destiny on Swift's past songs (as cited by critics, namely "You Belong with Me", "Don't Blame Me", "Invisible String", or "Long Story Short").

Some critics commented that the song's confessional and openly personal sentiments are representative of Midnights' overarching lyrical theme. Jon Caramanica from The New York Times described the track as Swift's "villain origin story", highlighting the bridge's lyrics, "No one wanted to play with me as a little kid/ So I've been scheming like a criminal ever since/ To make them love me and make it seem effortless." Hannah Mylrea from NME considered the cited lyrics a personal revelation that only comes to light "in the wee hours". Rob Sheffield from Rolling Stone considered "Mastermind" a "flip side" of Swift's "Enchanted" (2010) and highlighted the lyric, "Checkmate! I couldn't lose." He said it was the appropriate "theme song" for Midnights, which he described as a concept album about Swift's "pathological lack of chill". For Variety's Chris Willman, the track was also a representation of how "women historically have to go to extreme lengths to be the steerer in relationships that controlling men typically screw up".

According to The A.V. Club's Saloni Gajjar, the track also makes fun of Swift's public image and dating history. In a review for the Los Angeles Times, Mikael Wood wrote that in addition to being a confession of Swift's love life, "Mastermind" is also about her career maneuver from a teenage country musician to a global pop star ("I laid the groundwork/ and then just like clockwork/ the dominoes cascaded in a line"). For some critics, the lyrics were not meant to be taken too seriously; Willman cited the lyric, "I swear, I'm only cryptic and Machiavellian 'cause I care", and said that Swift was both "kidding" and being "dead-serious". Brittany Spanos of Rolling Stone thought that the said lyric demonstrated Swift's "clue-leaving ways". Entertainment Weekly's Lauren Huff thought the track displayed Swift's "self-deprecating humor", similarly to her 2014 single "Blank Space".

== Release and reception ==
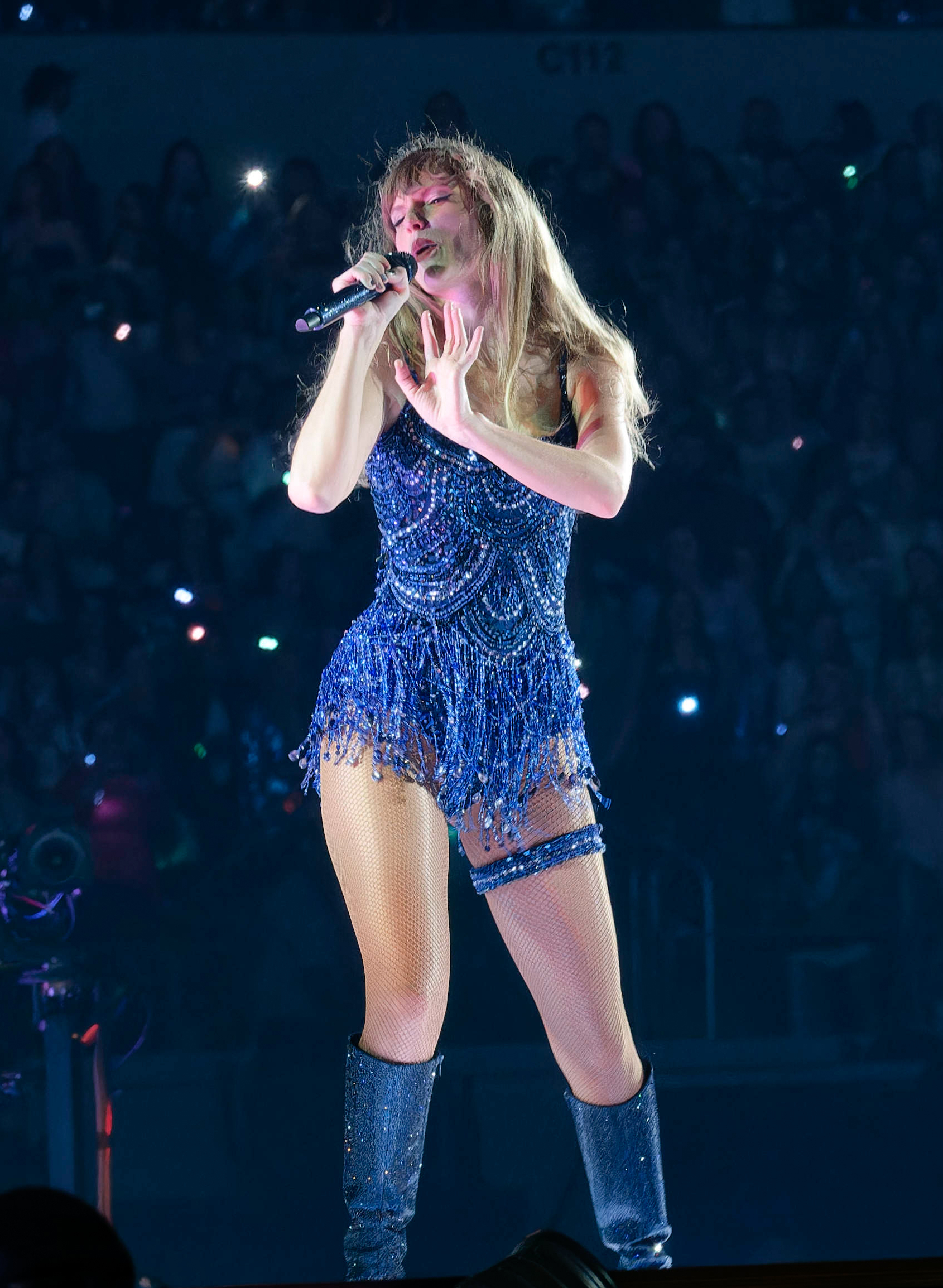
Swift performing "Mastermind" on the Eras Tour in 2023

Republic Records released Midnights on October 21, 2022; "Mastermind" is number 13 on the track listing and serves as standard edition's closing track. Swift included "Mastermind" on the set list of her sixth headlining concert tour, the Eras Tour (2023–2024). "Mastermind" peaked within the top 20 of singles charts in Australia (12), Canada (12), the Philippines (13), Singapore (14), and Malaysia (18); and further debuted in Portugal (33), Vietnam (33), Lithuania (51), the Czech Republic (52), Sweden (56), Slovakia (62), and Spain (80). On the Billboard Global 200, all 13 tracks of the standard edition debuted inside the top-15 of the chart simultaneously; "Mastermind" was at number 13. In the United States, it peaked at number 13 on the Billboard Hot 100. "Mastermind" received certifications in Australia (platinum), Canada (gold), and the United Kingdom (gold).

Music critics gave "Mastermind" positive reviews, focusing on the songwriting. Mikael Wood of the Los Angeles Times picked "Mastermind" as an album highlight. He praised the "intricate rhythm" of the lyrics for conjecturing an "indelible picture" and, citing the lyric "If you fail to plan, you plan to fail", wrote: "Only Swift could make a self-help slogan sound like a fairy tale." Caramanica also selected the track as a standout on Midnights for portraying Swift's self-observation about her image. For Mylrae, the song displays Swift's songwriting at its most candid. Paste's Ellen Johnston said the track was "gratifying", Esquire's Alan Light complimented it as "breathtaking", and Beats Per Minute described it as a "luxuriously sexual and clever song" with "striking" lyricism. Light favorably compared the confessional vulnerability of "Mastermind" to the "defensive, reactive" sentiments of Swift's 2017 single "Look What You Made Me Do" and described the development between the two songs as a "breakthrough".

Other critics also praised the production. In Vulture, Nate Jones highlighted the lyrics as either "parody masquerading as confession" or "confession masquerading as parody" and praised the synth production in the pre-chorus. Ludovic Hunter-Tilney from the Financial Times lauded Swift's vocals for switching "between cool self-possession and enraptured transport". Billboard's Jason Lipshutz ranked "Mastermind" third out of 13 Midnights album tracks. He said that the song was both "ornately constructed" and "brilliantly self-effacing".

== Personnel ==
Credits are adapted from liner notes of Midnights.

- Taylor Swift – vocals, songwriter, producer
- Jack Antonoff – songwriter, producer, engineer, recording, drums, programming, percussion, Juno, Minimoog, electric guitars, background vocals
- Bobby Hawk – violin
- Evan Smith – synths, saxophone, engineer, recording
- Michael Riddleberger – drums, engineer
- Mikey Freedom Hart – programming, Minimoog, engineer
- Zem Audu – saxophone, engineer, recording
- Megan Searl – assistant engineer
- Jon Sher – assistant engineer
- John Rooney – assistant engineer
- Serban Ghenea – mixing
- Bryce Bordone – assistant mix engineer
- Randy Merrill – mastering engineer
- Laura Sisk – recording
- Jon Gautier – recording
- David Hart – recording

== Charts ==
Chart performance for "Mastermind"
Chart (2022)	Peak position
Australia (ARIA)	12
Canada Hot 100 (Billboard)	12
Czech Republic Singles Digital (ČNS IFPI)	52
Global 200 (Billboard)	13
Greece International (IFPI)	23
Lithuania (AGATA)	51
Malaysia International (RIM)	18
Philippines (Billboard)	13
Portugal (AFP)	33
Singapore (RIAS)	14
Slovakia Singles Digital (ČNS IFPI)	62
Spain (Promusicae)	80
Sweden (Sverigetopplistan)	56
Swiss Streaming (Schweizer Hitparade)	60
UK Audio Streaming (Official Charts)	15
US Billboard Hot 100	13
Vietnam Hot 100 (Billboard)	33

== Certifications ==
Certifications for "Mastermind"
Region	Certification	Certified units/sales
Australia (ARIA)	Platinum	70,000^{‡}
Brazil (Pro-Música Brasil)	Gold	20,000^{‡}
Canada (Music Canada)	Gold	40,000^{‡}
New Zealand (RMNZ)	Platinum	30,000^{‡}
United Kingdom (BPI)	Gold	400,000^{‡}
^{‡} Sales+streaming figures based on certification alone.
