= Would've, Could've, Should've =

2022 song by Taylor Swift

Song by Taylor Swift

from the album Midnights (3am Edition)
- Released: October 21, 2022
- Genre: Soft rock; indie pop
- Length: 4:20
- Label: Republic
- Songwriters: Taylor Swift; Aaron Dessner
- Producers: Taylor Swift; Aaron Dessner

Lyric video
- "Would've, Could've, Should've" on YouTube

"Would've, Could've, Should've" is a song by the American singer-songwriter Taylor Swift. It is a bonus track originally released as part of the 3am Edition of her tenth studio album, Midnights (2022). Written and produced by Swift and Aaron Dessner, it is a new wave-leaning soft rock and indie pop song about a narrator's rumination of a flawed, age-inappropriate romantic relationship in the past.

Music critics highly praised the lyrics, production, and emotional sentiments of the song, with some picking it as an album highlight. The song was included in 2022 year-end best-of lists by Business Insider, Rolling Stone, and Slant Magazine. It peaked at number 20 on the US Billboard Hot 100, number 21 on the Billboard Global 200, and charted in Canada, the Philippines, Portugal, Sweden, and Vietnam.

== Background and release ==
On August 28, 2022, Swift announced her tenth studio album Midnights during her acceptance speech when she won Video of the Year for All Too Well: The Short Film at the 2022 MTV Video Music Awards. The 13-track album was released at midnight on October 21, 2022, Eastern Time, by Republic Records. Three hours later, the 3am Edition of Midnights, which features "Would've, Could've, Should've" and six other songs, was surprise-released. The song was also included on the Til Dawn and Late Night editions of the album that were released on May 26, 2023. Aaron Dessner, who had collaborated with Swift on her 2020 studio albums Folklore and Evermore, worked on four tracks of the 3am Edition, including "Would've, Could've, Should've".

On May 8, 2023, Swift performed the song with Dessner during the Nashville stop as part of her sixth headlining concert tour, the Eras Tour. In 2024, she performed it two times as part of mashups with her other songs on the Eras Tour; the first one was with "Ivy" (2020) at Sydney on February 26 and the second was with "I Know Places" (2014) at Edinburgh on June 7. "Would've, Could've, Should've" debuted and peaked at number 20 on the US Billboard Hot 100. On the Billboard Global 200, it peaked at number 21. The track peaked on singles charts including the Canadian Hot 100 (18), the Portuguese singles chart (66), the Philippines Songs chart (23), and the Billboard Vietnam Hot 100 chart (96).

== Composition ==
Swift wrote and produced "Would've, Could've, Should've" with Dessner in 2021, while the duo was in Los Angeles for the 2021 Grammy Awards. Dessner plays numerous instruments for the track including bass guitar, electric guitar, acoustic guitar, harmonica, synthesizer, and piano. Other musicians include Bryce Dessner (electric guitar), James McAlister (drums, synthesizer), Bryan Devendorf (drums), and Thomas Bartlett (keyboards, synthesizer). The track's production features steadily building acoustic guitar, synthesizers, and distortion. It is a soft rock and indie pop song, with elements of new wave. In The Oregonian, Lizzy Acker found the track containing "an almost-country vibe". Commenting on the production, USA Today's Melissa Ruggieri said it features "a galloping cadence and soaring chorus".

In the lyrics, a narrator ruminates about a past relationship with an older man when she was 19 years old and how it still haunts her into adulthood. The narrator reflects on the relationship, "I damn sure never would've danced with the devil at 19 / And the God's honest truth is that the pain was heaven / And now that I'm grown, I'm scared of ghosts." She examines how the trauma turned her memories into weapons ("I regret you all the time"), but also admits how it used to entertain her ("the God's honest truth is that the pain was heaven"). Religious references are prevalent ("You're a crisis of my faith" and "The tomb won't close, stained glass windows in my mind").

"Would've, Could've, Should've"
A sample of "Would've, Could've, Should've", a soft rock song with a distorted production combining guitars and synthesizers.

The bridge contains the lyric that some critics found striking and most cutting, "Living for the thrill of hitting you where it hurts / Give me back my girlhood, it was mine first", accusing the man of stealing her innocence, and abusing her emotionally. Many critics viewed "Would've, Could've, Should've" as a loose sequel to Swift's 2010 song "Dear John", as both are about a teenage girl dealing with a relationship with an older man. Rob Sheffield from Rolling Stone considered "Would've, Could've, Should've" "messier, more confused, more ambivalent". In Slate, Carl Wilson said the song finds Swift "returning to stories that feel familiar, but with second thoughts".

== Reception ==
Many critics considered "Would've, Could've, Should've" the best track on the 3am Edition of Midnights, and some commented that it even outshines the 13 tracks on the standard edition and questioned Swift's decision to include it as a bonus track. A few agreed with the song's status as a 3am Edition-only track because it stands out production-wise; Variety journalist Chris Willman added that the painful lyrics might tarnish the rather playful Midnights. Wilson called the song a "killer" with intense lyrics that feel like "where she stays inside the house as it burns". Quinn Moreland from Pitchfork picked it as one of the best songs of Swift's career, and praised the nuanced, mature perspective compared to the 2010 track "Dear John". In The Atlantic, Shirley Li commented that despite the media gossip that surrounded the subject behind "Would've, Could've, Should've", the track would stand the test of time thanks to its emotional sentiments. Acker was less complimentary; she deemed the track not as fun as other Midnights songs. The song was ranked in year-end lists of the best songs of 2022 by Business Insider (1st), Slant Magazine (24th), and Rolling Stone (59th).

== Credits and personnel ==
Credits are adapted from Tidal.

- Taylor Swift – vocals, songwriting, production
- Aaron Dessner – songwriting, production, bass guitar, drum programming, drums, electric guitar, guitar, harmonica, piano, synthesizer, recording engineering
- Bryce Dessner – electric guitar
- James McAlister – drum programming, drums, synthesizer
- Bryan Devendorf – drums
- Thomas Bartlett – keyboards, synthesizer, additional engineering
- Jonathan Low – mixing, recording engineering, vocal engineering
- Randy Merrill – mastering
- Bella Blasko – recording engineering
- Justin Vernon – additional engineering

== Charts ==
Chart performance for "Would've, Could've, Should've"
Chart (2022)	Peak position
Canada Hot 100 (Billboard)	18
Global 200 (Billboard)	21
Greece International (IFPI)	49
Philippines (Billboard)	23
Portugal (AFP)	66
Sweden Heatseeker (Sverigetopplistan)	4
UK Audio Streaming (OCC)	31
UK Singles Downloads (OCC)	11
UK Singles Sales (OCC)	15
US Billboard Hot 100	20
Vietnam Hot 100 (Billboard)	96

== Certifications ==
Region	Certification	Certified units/sales
Australia (ARIA)	Platinum	70,000^{‡}
Brazil (Pro-Música Brasil)	Gold	20,000^{‡}
New Zealand (RMNZ)	Gold	15,000^{‡}
United Kingdom (BPI)	Silver	200,000^{‡}
^{‡} Sales+streaming figures based on certification alone.
