= You're Losing Me =

2023 promotional single by Taylor Swift

Promotional single by Taylor Swift

from the album Midnights (The Late Night Edition)
- Written: December 5, 2021
- Released: November 29, 2023
- Recorded: December 5, 2021
- Genre: Downtempo
- Length: 4:38
- Label: Republic
- Songwriters: Taylor Swift; Jack Antonoff
- Producers: Taylor Swift; Jack Antonoff

Audio video
- "You're Losing Me" on YouTube

"You're Losing Me" (Note: Subtitled "(From the Vault)") is a song by the American singer-songwriter Taylor Swift, who wrote and produced it with Jack Antonoff. The song first appeared as a bonus track on The Late Night Edition of Swift's 2022 studio album Midnights, released by Republic Records, in May 2023. The edition was only on CD and available for in-person purchase at certain venues of the Eras Tour for a limited time, following which the song was widely shared and available on social media. It was released for streaming on November 29, 2023.

A downtempo ballad, "You're Losing Me" has an atmospheric production featuring synthesizers and samples of Swift's heartbeat. Its lyrics describe the imminent dissolution of a long-term romantic relationship due to a misunderstanding between the partners. Music critics praised the track for the emotional nuance they perceived in its composition and storytelling. Critics and fans alike connected the lyrics to the end of Swift's six-year romance with the English actor Joe Alwyn in early 2023.

Commercially, "You're Losing Me" reached number 27 on the US Billboard Hot 100 and peaked atop the Digital Songs chart. Elsewhere, it topped the Philippines Songs chart and peaked within the top 20 on the Billboard Global 200 and in Australia, Canada, Ireland, New Zealand, and Singapore. Swift performed the song three times during the shows of her Eras Tour (2023–2024).

== Background and release ==
Taylor Swift released her tenth studio album, Midnights, on October 21, 2022, to wide critical and commercial success. Upon release, the album was available as a standard edition of 13 songs, a CD-exclusive deluxe edition that contained the bonus track "Hits Different", and a digital-exclusive 3am Edition with seven additional songs. On May 24, 2023, Swift announced two more editions of Midnights during her Eras Tour (2023–2024): the digital-exclusive Til Dawn Edition and the CD-exclusive Late Night Edition containing the bonus track "You're Losing Me". The Late Night Edition was only purchasable in-person at merchandise stands of the US leg of the Eras Tour starting in East Rutherford, New Jersey, on May 26–28, 2023.

"You're Losing Me" became a "ravenously anticipated" track according to Variety, which reported that "fans were so eager to get their hands" on the CD, causing lines at the stadium a day before the opening of the merchandise store at 12:30 PM EDT on May 26. Some concert attendees, after purchasing the CD, went back to their cars and uploaded the track online, which was widely shared on social media. The Late Night Edition including "You're Losing Me" was subsequently sold as a digital album for limited-time download on Swift's webstore. Unofficial releases of the song uploaded by fans on the internet were struck with takedown notices by Universal Music.

Swift's fans, Swifties, had requested that she grant "You're Losing Me" a wide release, including making it available on streaming platforms. After Midnights (The Late Night Edition), Swift went on to release Speak Now (Taylor's Version) in July 2023 and 1989 (Taylor's Version) in October 2023. On November 29, Swift released the song to streaming services as a token of gratitude to her fans, after Spotify revealed her as the "Global Top Artist"—the most streamed artist on Spotify in a year—of 2023. On February 16, 2024, Swift performed "You're Losing Me" at the Melbourne stop of her Eras Tour. She sang it again as part of a mashup with her song "The Great War" (2022) at the tour's Liverpool stop on June 14. At the tour's final Toronto stop on November 23, she performed "You're Losing Me" in a mashup with her 2024 song "How Did It End?" on piano. The song was featured on season three of the Amazon Prime Video original romantic drama television series The Summer I Turned Pretty.

== Composition and lyrics ==
Swift wrote "You're Losing Me" with Jack Antonoff, on December 5, 2021, and recorded it on the same day. It was conceived for Midnights, but did not make the album's standard or deluxe track list, and was hence subtitled "From the Vault". The track was produced by Swift and Antonoff, who handled its programming. He played cello, drums, percussion, piano, and synthesizers including Mellotron and Wurlitzer, and Bobby Hawk played violin. It was mixed by Serban Ghenea with the assistance of Bryce Bordone and mastered by Randy Merrill. "You're Losing Me" is a downtempo ballad incorporating twinkling synthesizers and sparse and steady beats that samples Swift's heartbeat. Writing for Business Insider, Callie Ahlgrim described the song's production as "airy".

The lyrics are autobiographical in nature, describing the despair and tragic dissolution of a relationship. The overarching message of the song is that the narrator "has put her everything into fighting for the relationship, but she doesn't feel that effort is returned." The main lyrical motif is a word play on the phrase "we're losing him/her", generally used in emergency departments depicted in medical drama shows. Swift makes various references to injury and ailment throughout the song to convey the heartache. A deep sigh begins the song. The first verse portrays two people who have grown apart in their romantic relationship due to their growing lack of mutual understanding. In the chorus, the narrator cautions their partner about the imminent end of their relationship, over beats mimicking "a quietly pulsing heartbeat". The second verse reveals how the couple grew apart; the pre-chorus depicts indecision, while the bridge examines the issues within the fading romance, such as how the subject—who insists on pretending that the relationship is healthy—"will not make the tough decisions" to stay with the narrator, who feels coerced into deciding "against continuing in the relationship" as there is a difference of opinions within the couple over the state of the relationship.

Critics as well as fans have interpreted the lyrics to be about the end of Swift's six-year romantic relationship with the English actor Joe Alwyn, which was a subject of widespread media coverage in April 2023. In the song's bridge, Swift suggests that the relationship could have led to marriage, possibly referencing "Lavender Haze" (2022), the opening track of Midnights, whose lyrics mention avoiding discussion of marriage in order to enjoy "the honeymoon phase". Swift also describes herself as a "pathological people pleaser", which is considered a reference to "Anti-Hero" (2022), a song that discusses Swift's insecurities. Parallels and contrasts have been noted between the music and lyrics of "You're Losing Me" and those of Swift's 2019 track "Cornelia Street".

== Critical reception ==
Critics lauded the vulnerability that was displayed on the track. In a rave review, Steffanee Wang of Nylon praised the portrayal of heartbreak and sorrow without involving "mic drop moments" or "accusations", the frank tone of its confessional lyrics, the song structure, and Swift's "palpable" restraint in details. Wang commented that "You're Losing Me" could be her "most devastating" song, eclipsing her 2012 track "All Too Well". Writing for Bustle, Stephanie Topacio Long opined that the song is "about a relationship going from critically wounded to fatally damaged." The Billboard journalist Ashley Iasimone called "You're Losing Me" an "emotionally-charged" ballad that illustrates the "painful, slow ending of a longterm relationship." The Variety critic Chris Willman appreciated Swift's decision to release the song as a bonus track, arguing it would have barely fit with the upbeat, sensual production of the standard Midnights. Callie Ahlgrim of Business Insider christened "You're Losing Me" as the true closing track of Midnights, recontextualizing the album as a body of work "about agonizing and dissociating, not just reminiscing." In a list by Rolling Stone ranking the best songs of 2023, "You're Losing Me" placed at number 86. The Independent's Roisin O'Connor in 2024 deemed it Swift's greatest breakup song.

== Accolades ==
Awards and nominations for "You're Losing Me"
Award	Year	Category	Result	Ref.
RTHK International Pop Poll Awards	2024	Top Ten International Gold Songs	Won	
RTHK International Pop Poll Awards	2024	Super Gold Songs	Won	

== Commercial performance ==
In the United States, within two days of tracking, "You're Losing Me" debuted at number 46 on the Billboard Hot 100 chart, where it marked Swift's 54th entry on the chart in 2023. Collecting 8.7 million streams and selling 19,000 downloads in those two days, the song debuted at number one on the Billboard Digital Songs chart—Swift's 28th song to top the chart. Following its first full tracking week, the song ascended to number 27 on the Hot 100 and became her 138th top-40 entry, which extended her record of the most top-40 entries for a female artist. It also peaked atop the Philippines Songs chart and reached number 15 on the Billboard Global 200. Elsewhere, "You're Losing Me" peaked within the top 20 in Singapore (7), Australia (13), Ireland (14), Malaysia (14), New Zealand (15), Canada (18), and the United Kingdom (20).

== Personnel ==
Credits adapted from Tidal

- Taylor Swift – vocals, songwriting, production
- Jack Antonoff – songwriting, production, engineering, recording, programming, drums, percussion, piano, synthesizer, Wurlitzer, Mellotron, cello
- Bobby Hawk – violin
- Laura Sisk – engineering, recording
- Oli Jacobs – engineering, recording
- Megan Searl – assistant engineering
- John Sher – assistant engineering
- Daniel Cayotte – assistant engineering
- Jack Manning – assistant engineering
- Joey Miller – assistant engineering
- Jozeph Caldwell – assistant engineering
- Rémy Dumelz – assistant engineering
- Serban Ghenea – mixing
- Bryce Bordone – assistant mixing
- Randy Merrill – mastering

== Charts ==
Chart performance for "You're Losing Me"
Chart (2023)	Peak position
Australia (ARIA)	13
Canada Hot 100 (Billboard)	18
Global 200 (Billboard)	15
Greece International (IFPI)	43
Ireland (IRMA)	14
Japan Hot Overseas (Billboard Japan)	20
Malaysia (Billboard)	14
Malaysia International (RIM)	12
Netherlands (Single Tip)	1
Netherlands (Tipparade)	17
New Zealand (Recorded Music NZ)	15
Philippines (Billboard)	1
Portugal (AFP)	98
Singapore (RIAS)	7
Sweden (Sverigetopplistan)	90
Switzerland (Schweizer Hitparade)	82
UK Singles (Official Charts)	20
US Billboard Hot 100	27
Vietnam Hot 100 (Billboard)	36

== Certifications ==
Certification for "You're Losing Me"
Region	Certification	Certified units/sales
Australia (ARIA)	Platinum	70,000^{‡}
New Zealand (RMNZ)	Gold	15,000^{‡}
United Kingdom (BPI)	Silver	200,000^{‡}
^{‡} Sales+streaming figures based on certification alone.
