= Labyrinth (Taylor Swift song) =

2022 song by Taylor Swift

Song by Taylor Swift

from the album Midnights
- Released: October 21, 2022
- Studio: Rough Customer (Brooklyn); Electric Lady (New York City)
- Genre: Synth-pop; dance-pop; bedroom pop
- Length: 4:07
- Label: Republic
- Songwriters: Taylor Swift; Jack Antonoff
- Producers: Taylor Swift; Jack Antonoff

Lyric video
- "Labyrinth" on YouTube

"Labyrinth" is a song by the American singer-songwriter Taylor Swift from her tenth studio album, Midnights (2022). Written and produced by Swift and Jack Antonoff, it has a prominent electronic production. The track begins with dense, pulsating synthesizers, subtle guitars, muffled trap and house beats, and Swift's vocals in their upper register; its outro consists of repeated refrains sung with Swift's low-pitched voice. Music critics categorize the genre as synth-pop, dance-pop, and bedroom pop. In the lyrics, the narrator expresses her anxiety from falling in love again after going through heartbreak.

In reviews of Midnights, several music critics found the production of "Labyrinth" interesting, ethereal, and pretty. Some were also fond of the lyrical sentiments, but others found the vocal production insubstantial. "Labyrinth" peaked at number 12 on the Billboard Global 200 chart and reached the top 20 of singles charts in Australia, Canada, the Philippines, Singapore, and the United States. The track received certifications in Australia, Brazil, Canada, and the United Kingdom. Swift performed "Labyrinth" live three times on her sixth concert tour, the Eras Tour (2023–2024).

== Background and release ==
Taylor Swift announced her tenth original studio album, Midnights, at the 2022 MTV Video Music Awards on August 28; its title and cover artwork were released shortly after the same day via social media. She conceived Midnights as a collection of songs about her nocturnal ruminations, detailing a wide range of emotions such as regret, lust, nostalgia, contentment, and self-loathing. The standard album was produced by Swift and Jack Antonoff, as a result of the two experimenting with music while their partners were both shooting for a film in Panama. Swift announced the album's track listing via a thirteen-episode video series called Midnights Mayhem with Me on the platform TikTok, where each video contained the title of one track at a time. The title of "Labyrinth" was revealed in an episode posted on October 7, 2022.

Republic Records released Midnights on October 21, 2022; "Labyrinth" is track 10 out of 13 tracks on the standard edition. Upon the release of the album, "Labyrinth" peaked at number 12 on the Billboard Global 200 chart. The track peaked at number 14 on both the US Billboard Hot 100 and the Canadian Hot 100, number 13 on both the ARIA Singles Chart in Australia and the RIAS chart in Singapore, and number 10 on the Philippines Songs chart. The song additionally reached the top 40 on the charts in Malaysia, Portugal, and Vietnam; top 60 in Sweden and the Czech Republic; and top 100 in Lithuania, Slovakia, and Spain. "Labyrinth" was certified platinum in Australia, gold in Brazil and Canada, and silver in the United Kingdom.

Swift performed "Labyrinth" live three times on her sixth concert tour, the Eras Tour (2023–2024). On November 9, 2023, she sang a piano rendition at a concert in Buenos Aires, Argentina. She again performed the song on piano, this time as part of a mashup with her song "This Is Me Trying" (2020), at a concert in Gelsenkirchen, Germany, on July 18, 2024. At the November 21, 2024, concert in Toronto, Canada, she sang a piano mashup of "Labyrinth" and "State of Grace" (2012).

== Music and lyrics ==
"Labyrinth"
A sample of the instrumental break after the first verse, leading up to the second verse, showing the dense synthesizers that accompany Swift's falsetto vocals

Swift wrote and produced "Labyrinth" with Antonoff. At four minutes and seven seconds long, the track has a prominent electronic production. Consisting of dense, pulsating synthesizers, the production begins with a synth sequence and interjecting vocal samples, before proceeding with a layered arrangement of synths, electric guitars, distant orchestral bells, sounds of a church organ and filtered wind instruments. Swift sings in the verse in the upper register of her vocals, with a soft timbre. According to the music critic Annie Zaleski, the sound is "sparse and diaphanous": it comprises thick and atmospheric synthesizers, muffled beats, and "wriggling keyboard flourishes", as Swift sings the verses in her "breathy" falsetto range. Rob Sheffield, writing for Rolling Stone, described how the synths "flicker and splutter like the circuits are melting down", and Quinn Moreland of Pitchfork compared each "synth quiver" to "a pump of new blood".

Music critics categorize the overall sound as synth-pop, "muted" dance-pop, and bedroom pop. The bass displays influences of dubstep, while the beats incorporate trap and house elements. Writing for the Associated Press, Elise Ryan found "Labyrinth" to be an amalgamation of styles on Swift's past albums, namely the synth sounds of 1989 (2014) and the "softer" alternative of Folklore (2020). The outro, starting from the 2:55 mark, is made up of repeated refrains, delivered by Swift's vocals that are pitched down to an octave lower, until they slowly fade out. It is accompanied by an accelerated bass programming pattern; Elle's Lauren Puckett-Pove described the beat as "funkier, dance-like". Commenting on the vocal effects, Alexis Petridis of The Guardian said that they "warp [Swift's] voice to a point of androgyny", and Ann Powers of NPR wrote that her vocals turn into "myriad light streams" that resemble a Bon Iver song.

The lyrics are about anxiety caused by a new romantic beginning. The first verse sees the narrator pondering on a recent breakup; "I'll be gettin' over you my whole life." In the refrain, the narrator wonders if she is falling in love again too fast, but decides to open up again; "Uh-oh, I'm falling in love/ Oh no, I'm falling in love again/ Oh, I'm falling in love." She likens the sensations evoked from this infatuation to violent imagery of a plane that is about to fall and an elevator that rises too fast; "I thought the plane was going down/ How'd you turn it right around?" She tries to control her anxiety; "Breathe in, breathe through, breathe deep, breathe out"—this lyric had been recited in Swift's commencement speech at New York University several months earlier. In the second verse, the narrator wonders if this newfound love will break her heart again, but she could not resist being drawn to it; "Break up, break free, break through, break down/ You would break your back to make me break a smile."

Several critics analyzed how the production accompanies the lyrical sentiments. Moreland wrote that the pulsating synthesizers "[mirror] the ice melting around [Swift's] heart" as she sings about finding love again. According to Zaleski, the refrain has a "more equanimous groove" compared to the initial parts, with Swift's vocals being smoothed out and sounding "less panicked", suggesting an acceptance of this newfound romance. Brittany Spanos of Rolling Stone thought otherwise that the romance in question is "potentially lost". Likening the plane imagery in "Labyrinth" to that in Swift's other songs, (Note: Namely "Last Kiss" from Speak Now (2010), "Come Back... Be Here" from Red (2012), "Out of the Woods" from 1989 (2014), and "Getaway Car" and "Call It What You Want" from Reputation (2017)) Rebecca Jennings of Vox said that it symbolizes uncertainty and uneasiness caused by both romantic beginnings and romantic fallouts. In the view of Alan Light from Esquire, the lyrics additionally allude to Swift's fear and pressure from her fame and the resulting expectations; "You know how much I hate that everybody just expects me to bounce back/ Just like that."

== Critical reception ==
"Labyrinth" received generally positive reviews. Billboard's Jason Lipshutz placed it sixth out of the 13 songs on Midnights, describing it as the album's prettiest and most intimate song. Critics who found the minimalist production tasteful include Sheffield, Konstantinos Pappis from Our Culture Mag, Alaina Conaway from The Sentinel, and John Wohlmacher from Beats Per Minute. Others, including Lipshutz, USA Today's Melissa Ruggieri, and Les Echos' Cecilia Delporte described the production as ethereal. Pappis characterized the track as a midpoint between "grandiosity and resonance" and "moody restraint", Light considered it a nuanced deep cut, while Mary Kate Carr from The A.V. Club called the song "deceptively simple yet hauntingly beautiful".

Many critics considered "Labyrinth" a worthwhile musical risk. According to Ryan, it shows "the best of her previous pop experiments". In The Wall Street Journal, Mark Richardson complimented how the minimal textures of "Labyrinth" succeeded by "amply using space" without relying on complicated embellishments. Conaway thought that the track was a risk because it favored an airy instrumental and minimal lyrics over the complex phrasings of Swift's previous songs, which showcased her artistic versatility. Sheffield and Mikael Wood of the Los Angeles Times praised how the track allowed the different shades of Swift's vocals to shine; the former designated it as a "stealth classic". Pappis and Clash's Matthew Neale praised the song's lyrics. Neale characterized the track as a balance between romantic lyricism and "electropop vulnerability" and lauded the refrain ("I'm falling in love again") as "triumphant", adding that it could have been "mawkish in the wrong hands".

Opinions were mixed on the vocal effects. Writing for Spin, Bobby Olivier said that the song successfully created a somber atmosphere, while Al Shipley felt the sound was "like an embarrassing relic of 2010s SoundCloud production trends". The Times' Will Hodgkinson described the vocal manipulation as "modish" and "off-putting", and Powers wrote that it somewhat diminished the impact of Swift's songwriting. Callie Ahlgrim and Courteney Larocca of Business Insider found the song pleasant to listen to but added that it became uninteresting as it progressed, finding it a somewhat boring but "understandable inclusion" on Midnights.

== Credits and personnel ==
Credits are adapted from the liner notes of Midnights.

Studios

- Recorded at Rough Customer Studio, Brooklyn; and Electric Lady Studios, New York City
- Mixed at MixStar Studios, Virginia Beach, Virginia
- Mastered at Sterling Sound, Edgewater, New Jersey

Personnel

- Taylor Swift – vocals, songwriting, production
- Jack Antonoff – songwriting, production, programming, percussion, Juno 6, Realistic Synth, OB8, Moog, electric guitars, background vocals, recording
- Megan Searl – assistant engineer
- Jon Sher – assistant engineer
- John Rooney – assistant engineer
- Serban Ghenea – mixing
- Bryce Bordone – assistant mix engineer
- Randy Merrill – mastering
- Laura Sisk – recording
- Evan Smith – mastering for vinyl

== Charts ==
Chart performance
Chart (2022)	Peak position
Australia (ARIA)	13
Canada Hot 100 (Billboard)	14
Czech Republic Singles Digital (ČNS IFPI)	60
Global 200 (Billboard)	12
Greece International (IFPI)	25
Lithuania (AGATA)	64
Malaysia International (RIM)	22
Philippines (Billboard)	10
Portugal (AFP)	32
Singapore (RIAS)	13
Slovakia Singles Digital (ČNS IFPI)	65
Spain (Promusicae)	81
Sweden (Sverigetopplistan)	52
Swiss Streaming (Schweizer Hitparade)	58
UK Audio Streaming (Official Charts)	17
US Billboard Hot 100	14
Vietnam Hot 100 (Billboard)	28

== Certifications ==
Certifications
Region	Certification	Certified units/sales
Australia (ARIA)	Platinum	70,000^{‡}
Brazil (Pro-Música Brasil)	Gold	20,000^{‡}
Canada (Music Canada)	Gold	40,000^{‡}
New Zealand (RMNZ)	Gold	15,000^{‡}
United Kingdom (BPI)	Silver	200,000^{‡}
^{‡} Sales+streaming figures based on certification alone.
