= High Infidelity (song) =

2022 song by Taylor Swift

Song by Taylor Swift

from the album Midnights (3am Edition)
- Released: October 21, 2022
- Length: 3:51
- Label: Republic
- Songwriters: Taylor Swift; Aaron Dessner
- Producers: Taylor Swift; Aaron Dessner

Lyric video
- "High Infidelity" on YouTube

"High Infidelity" is a song by the American singer-songwriter Taylor Swift from the 3am Edition of her tenth studio album, Midnights (2022). Written and produced by Swift and Aaron Dessner, "High Infidelity" describes a narrator who leaves a broken relationship and moves on with another man. Its lyrics mentioning the date of April 29 led to Swift's fans naming it "High Infidelity Day". Several reviews considered the songwriting nuanced and self-referential. The track reached number 31 on the Billboard Global 200 and the top 40 on the national charts of Canada and the United States. Swift performed the song twice on the Eras Tour (2023–2024).

== Release and composition ==
Taylor Swift framed her tenth studio album, Midnights, as a concept album about her nocturnal ruminations inspired by her sleepless nights. Three hours after the standard edition of the album was released, an extended version titled the 3am Edition was surprise-released on October 21, 2022. "High Infidelity" is one of seven bonus tracks, being the 17th song out of 20 in the album's track listing. The track is 3 minutes and 51 seconds long. Swift wrote and produced it with Aaron Dessner, who played the percussion, keyboards, piano, synthesizers, acoustic guitar, among other instruments. Other musicians and additional engineers include James McAlister on synths, percussion and programming, Thomas Bartlett on synths and Ben Lanz on trombone and drums. James Krivchenia also played drums on the song. The track was recorded by Bella Blasko and Jonathan Low, who also mixed it. The production is accompanied by blipping keyboards.

"High Infidelity" chronicles the end of a relationship. In the lyrics, the narrator leaves her partner after feeling unloved and constantly judged, and asks whether he wanted to know how she had already moved on with another man ("Do you really want to know where I was April 29th?/ Do I really have to tell you how he brought me back to life?"). Swift's fans named April 29 as "High Infidelity Day" due to the lyrics mentioning the date. Business Insider's Callie Ahlgrim deemed "High Infidelity" an "embittered counterpart" to Swift's 2021 single "Renegade", because both songs address the consequences of "a half-hearted kind of love". Courteney Larocca from the same publication similarly compared it to her song "Illicit Affairs" (2020), stating that both tracks detail the inevitable end of ill-fated romances.

== Reception and live performances ==
Variety's Chris Willman wrote that the track was an intriguing self-referential to Swift's past relationships. Ahlgrim wrote that the song displayed Swift's "wit and sensitivity", considering it a "nuanced and insightful probe" into her complex psyche revolving self-perception. Rob Sheffield of Rolling Stone ranked "High Infidelity" at number 143 out of 286 songs that Swift had released by October 2025; he called it a highlight off the 3am Edition of Midnights, comparing the metaphor of audio distortion for a bad romantic relationship to that used in Elvis Costello's "High Fidelity" (1980). In a lukewarm review, Vulture's Nate Jones placed the track at number 204 out of 245 songs of Swift as of May 2024. He said that the line mentioning April 29 was intriguing, but the songwriting was inferior to Swift's works on her 2020 albums Folklore and Evermore.

"High Infidelity" peaked at numbers 31 on the Billboard Global 200, 33 on the US Billboard Hot 100, and 28 on the Canadian Hot 100. On April 29, 2023, Swift performed "High Infidelity" live for the first time, as a "surprise song" on acoustic guitar, at the Eras Tour concert in Atlanta. Before the performance, she strummed the guitar and improvised the lyric, "Do you really wanna know where I was April 29th? Atlanta, Georgia", before singing the full track. Swift performed "High Infidelity" on piano on May 24, 2024, in Lisbon, as a mashup with her 2024 song "Fresh Out the Slammer".

== Personnel ==
Credits adapted from Apple Music

- Taylor Swift – songwriting, production, vocals
- Aaron Dessner – songwriting, production, recording, piano, electric guitar, synthesizer, acoustic guitar, percussion, keyboards, programming, drums
- James McAlister – synthesizer, percussion, programming, additional engineering
- Thomas Bartlett – synthesizer, additional engineering
- Ben Lanz – trombone, drums, additional engineering
- James Krivchenia – drums
- Bella Blasko – recording
- Jonathan Low – mixing, recording, vocal recording

== Charts ==
Chart performance
Chart (2022)	Peak position
Canada Hot 100 (Billboard)	28
Global 200 (Billboard)	31
Greece International (IFPI)	90
Portugal (AFP)	91
UK Audio Streaming (Official Charts)	53
UK Singles Downloads (Official Charts)	17
UK Singles Sales (OCC)	21
US Billboard Hot 100	33

== Certification ==
Region	Certification	Certified units/sales
Australia (ARIA)	Gold	35,000^{‡}
^{‡} Sales+streaming figures based on certification alone.
