= Midnights =

- Standard edition cover

Studio album by Taylor Swift
- Released: October 21, 2022
- Recorded: c. 2021–2022
- Studios: Electric Lady (New York City); Henson Recording (Los Angeles); Rough Customer (Brooklyn)
- Genres: Synth-pop; electropop; bedroom pop; dream pop
- Length: 44:02
- Label: Republic
- Producers: Taylor Swift; Jack Antonoff; Sounwave; Jahaan Sweet; Keanu Beats

Taylor Swift chronology
Red (Taylor's Version) (2021)	Midnights (2022)	Lover (Live from Paris) (2023)

Singles from Midnights
- 1. "Anti-Hero" Released: October 21, 2022; 2. "Snow on the Beach" Released: November 7, 2022; 3. "Lavender Haze" Released: November 29, 2022; 4. "Karma" Released: May 1, 2023

Midnights is the tenth studio album by the American singer-songwriter Taylor Swift. It was released on October 21, 2022, through Republic Records. A concept album about nocturnal ruminations, it contains confessional songs that explore regret, self-criticism, fantasies, heartbreak, and infatuation. The lyrical details allude to Swift's personal life and fame.

Swift produced the album's standard edition with Jack Antonoff, while Sounwave, Jahaan Sweet, and Keanu Beats each co-produced two tracks. Midnights is a synth-pop, electropop, bedroom pop, and dream pop album with elements of electronica, hip-hop, and R&B. Its minimalist, electronic production is characterized by analog synthesizers, sparse drum machine beats, and digitally manipulated vocals. Antonoff and Aaron Dessner co-produced an extended 3am Edition that was surprise-released three hours after the standard edition.

Swift announced Midnights at the 2022 MTV Video Music Awards and promoted it extensively through social media. Midnights topped the charts and received multi-platinum certifications across the Americas, Europe, and Asia-Pacific. In the United States, it became Swift's fifth album to debut atop the Billboard 200 with over one million first-week copies and the best-selling album of 2022. Its songs made Swift the first artist to monopolize the top 10 of the US Billboard Hot 100. Midnights spawned four singles: the US chart-topper "Anti-Hero" and top-five entries "Snow on the Beach", "Lavender Haze", and "Karma".

Music critics regarded Midnights as an amalgamation of Swift's earlier albums and praised its autobiographical lyrics as engaging and refined. Most reviews complimented the production as cohesive and tasteful, although some deemed it conventional. Numerous publications featured the album on their rankings of the best albums of 2022. At the 2024 Grammy Awards, Midnights made Swift the first artist to win Album of the Year four times and also won Best Pop Vocal Album. To support Midnights along with her other albums, Swift embarked on the Eras Tour from March 2023 to December 2024.

== Background ==
The American singer-songwriter Taylor Swift began her career in country music in the 2000s, achieved global fame as a pop star in the 2010s, and earned critical acclaim as an indie folk songwriter after releasing the 2020 albums Folklore and Evermore during the COVID-19 pandemic. She began re-recording her first six studio albums in November 2020, due to a 2019 dispute with the music executive Scooter Braun, who acquired Swift's former record label Big Machine and the masters of those albums. She released two re-recorded albums in 2021: Fearless (Taylor's Version) and Red (Taylor's Version). Critics and academics deemed Swift's re-recordings a key event contributing to a wider industry discourse on artists' rights and artist–label relationships.

Amidst the re-recording projects, Swift attracted media attention following her appearance at Haim's One More Haim Tour concert in London in July 2022; it was her first live performance since 2019. At the 2022 MTV Video Music Awards on August 28, during her acceptance speech for Video of the Year, she announced a new original studio album. After the show, Swift revealed the album title, Midnights, on her social media. This was met with surprise from her fans, who had expected another re-recorded album in 2022. On music streaming platforms, Midnights was labeled "pop", which attracted media and public speculation on its sonic direction, after the "alternative" labelings of Folklore and Evermore.

== Lyrics and themes ==
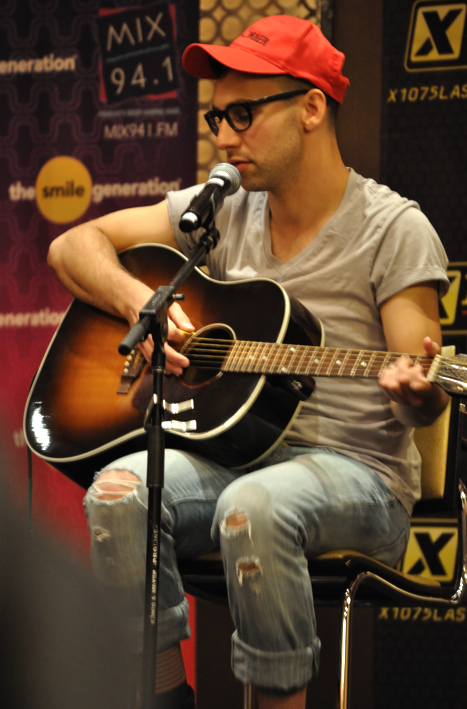
Jack Antonoff co-wrote 11 and co-produced all 13 tracks with Swift on the standard edition.

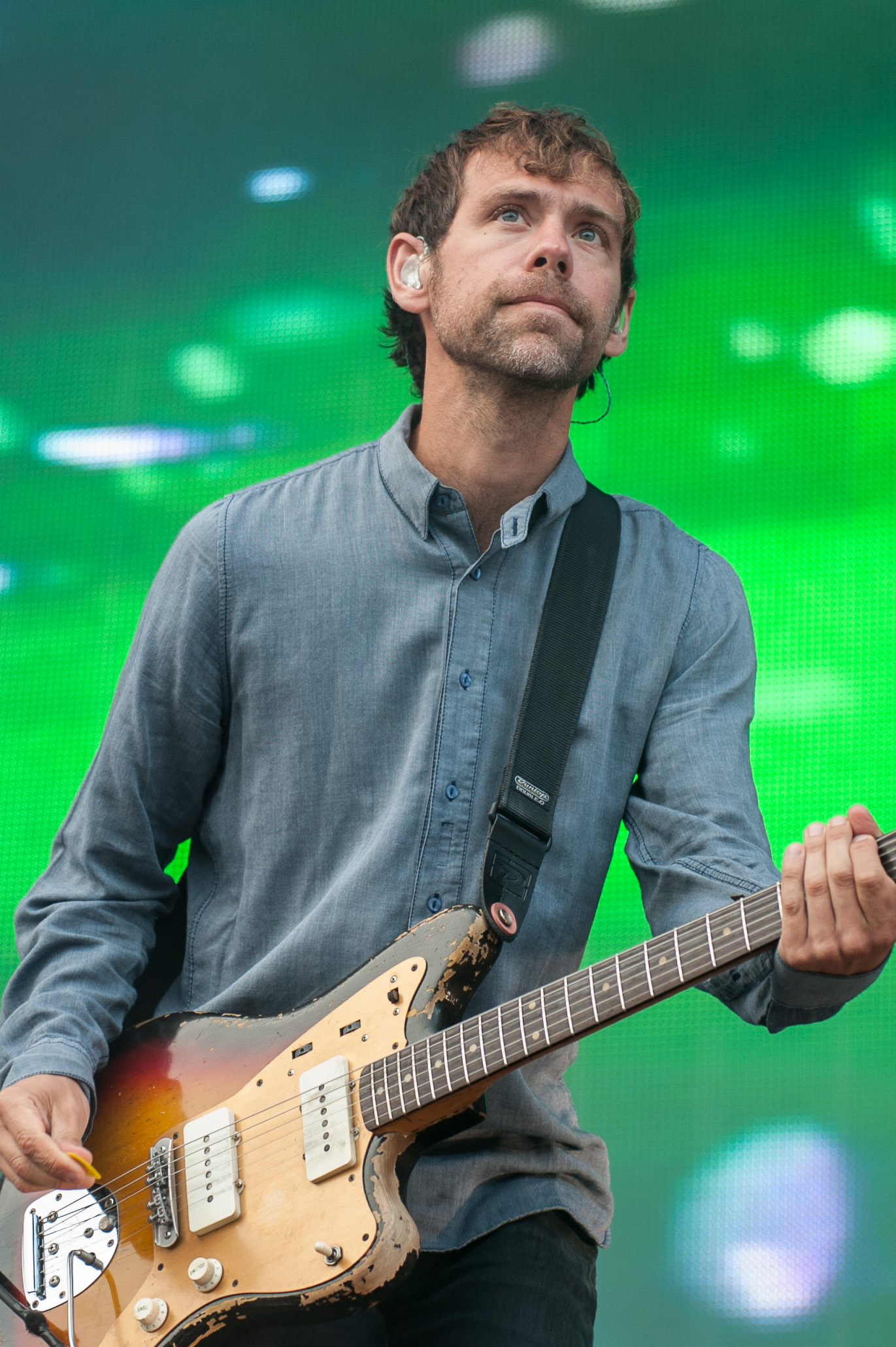
Aaron Dessner worked on three tracks for the 3 a.m. Edition.

For the standard edition of Midnights, Swift wrote 11 of the 13 tracks with Jack Antonoff, who had worked with her on every album since 1989 (2014). She wrote "Vigilante Shit" alone and "Sweet Nothing" with Joe Alwyn, who is credited under the pseudonym William Bowery. Other co-writers include Zoë Kravitz and Sam Dew ("Lavender Haze"), Jahaan Sweet and Sounwave ("Lavender Haze" and "Karma"), Keanu Beats ("Karma"), and Lana Del Rey ("Snow on the Beach", also featured artist). An extended 3am Edition containing seven additional tracks was written by Swift, who co-wrote four tracks with Antonoff and three with Aaron Dessner. Dew and Sounwave also shared writing credits on the track "Glitch".

Swift framed Midnights as a concept album inspired by her "sleepless nights", informed by five themes: self-hatred, revenge fantasies, "wondering what might have been", falling in love, and "falling apart". She had used midnight as a lyrical motif to depict romantic sentiments of vulnerability, yearning, sensuality, or being haunted by memories. Expanding on these connotations, Midnights situates Swift's narrator as a woman examining her own psyche during the afterhours, when she confronts her reckonings about both her past and her future. A personal album, it again employed the autobiographical songwriting that had characterized Swift's albums before Folklore and Evermore, which consisted of fictional narratives and character studies.

The songs in Midnights are backward-looking contemplations on Swift's life, using confessional lyrical details that allude to her personal life and public image. The songs address diverse moods and emotions: self-criticism, self-confidence, ruminations on past decisions, hopes, fears, regrets, fantasies, and infatuation. (Note: Attributed to Esquire's Alan Light, NME's Hannah Mylrea, PopMatters's Rick Quinn, Pitchfork's Quinn Moreland, and Entertainment Weekly's Allaire Nuss) Some music journalists argued that the broad themes resulted in Midnights being a loosely defined concept album; Alan Light of Esquire thought that the concept-album designation was questionable, despite the songs altogether constructing a cohesive record. Many songs are about those emotions ensuing from love. "Maroon" is about the haunting memories of a long-gone romance, while "Snow on the Beach" describes two people falling in love with each other at the same time. Swift ruminates over a broken relationship and how things could have turned out differently in "Question...?" and ponders the anxiety of falling in love again in "Labyrinth".

Many songs address Swift's fame and how it intertwines with her personal life. According to The New York Times' Lindsay Zoladz, these songs find Swift no longer seeing marriage as ideal, as depicted by her 2008 single "Love Story", and instead convey her ambivalent viewpoints on romance and adulthood. "Lavender Haze" details the online tabloid scrutiny that she received for her relationship. In "Anti-Hero", she details her insecurities and how her celebrity status hinders her from having meaningful relationships. "You're on Your Own, Kid" is an introspection on Swift's rise to fame and how alienating it was. In "Midnight Rain", Swift reflects on a forgone love back in her hometown and how she chose fame over a domestic life. "Labyrinth" hints at the pressure she faces in the spotlight, a sentiment that is also addressed in "Sweet Nothing", which describes a calming romantic relationship amidst the chaos of the outer world. In the standard edition's closer, "Mastermind", Swift admits to her lover that she is the one strategizing every move of their relationship and makes fun of her image as a calculating woman.

The songs "Vigilante Shit" and "Karma" have lyrics that conjecture revenge fantasies against one's rivals. In the former, Swift's character sides with the ex-lover of her nemesis in a revenge plot. The latter has comical lyrics about how Swift benefits from karma: her righteous actions reward her with good outcomes in life, and she need not worry about sabotaging her rivals. Self-assurance is the theme of "Bejeweled", which depicts finding one's self-worth after a breakup.

The 3am Edition tracks have varied themes; The Atlantic's Shirley Li considered them more cathartic and metaphorical than the standard tracks. "The Great War" references World War I as an analogy of heartbreak, while "Would've, Could've, Should've" uses religious imagery to describe an adult woman's reflection on her traumatic loss of innocence during her adolescence. The vague, mournful lyrics of "Bigger Than the Whole Sky" are about losing something so soon without mentioning what exactly was lost. "Glitch" is about how an original plan of staying friends with somebody strays away to become a romance, and "Paris" sees Swift fantasizing about a romance in Paris while in her bedroom. In "High Infidelity", Swift's character takes responsibility for a failed relationship with no regrets. The 3am closing track, "Dear Reader", sees Swift beseeching her audience not to look up to her as a "guiding light".

== Production and music ==
Swift recorded all of the tracks of the standard edition and some from the later release of Midnights at Antonoff's Rough Customer studio in Brooklyn and at Electric Lady Studios in Greenwich Village, Manhattan. Two tracks created with other producers are "Lavender Haze" (Sounwave, Jahaan Sweet) and "Karma" (Sounwave, Keanu Beats). Sounwave created the first demo for "Lavender Haze" by experimenting with different sounds and "hitting one button by accident". He and Antonoff added vocal samples from Braxton Cook, and Swift helped complete the final production. After "Lavender Haze", Antonoff asked Sounwave if he had any additional music that could be suitable for Midnights. He then pitched to Antonoff a sample that Beats had created in 2019, and the production for the final track, "Karma", was completed after one day.

Midnights has a minimalist, electronic production. Antonoff used the Yamaha DX7 and Oberheim OB-8 synths to create the demos, and the final melodies are generated by analog synthesizers that date back to the 1960s or 1970s, such as Moog, Mellotron, and Juno 6. The mid-tempo compositions are driven by sparse drum machine beats and synthesized or electronically manipulated vocals. Two tracks that have acoustic-leaning soundscapes are "You're on Your Own, Kid", which is driven by electric guitar strums, and "Sweet Nothing", by an electric piano and horns. Swift's words, vocals, and Antonoff's production emphasize rhythms. Several tracks feature subdued tones of other instruments such as saxophone, clarinet, flutes, and keyboards, played by members of Antonoff's band, Bleachers.

"Lavender Haze"
"Lavender Haze" incorporates elements of R&B and hip-hop, and its bass evokes dance styles.

"Midnight Rain"
"Midnight Rain" has a dubstep-influenced bass and trap-and-house beats. Swift's vocals are pitched down to a low register that critics have found masculine or androgynous.

Contemporary reviews mostly categorized Midnights as synth-pop (Note: Attributed to Moreland, The Atlantic's Spencer Kornharber, The Guardian's Alexis Petridis, Vulture's Craig Jenkins, and The A.V. Club's Saloni Gajjar) and electropop. (Note: Attributed to Light, The Times's Will Hodgkinson, AllMusic's Stephen Thomas Erlewine, and Slant Magazine's Paul Attard) Several reviews described the album as bedroom pop and dream pop. Music critics deemed the album a throwback to the pop sounds of Swift's 1989, Reputation, and Lover, but its atmospheric production makes it relatively subdued and understated. (Note: Attributed to Petridis, Moreland, The Guardian's critic panel, Exclaim!'s Megan LaPierre, Paste's Ellen Johnson, The New York Times' Lindsay Zoladz, and The Observer's Kitty Empire) NPR's Ann Powers wrote that the sound "might be called ahistorical chillout music", with a "soft and mutable glow" that stimulated an intimate and isolated atmosphere. According to the popular culture academic Keith Nainby, Midnights has a cool sonic tone: compared to the insistent and urgent beats of 1989 or Reputation, its texture is smoother, with the pitch frequencies "closely matched from top to bottom" that make the instruments' colors blending into a unified palette.

Midnights incorporates influences from R&B, electronica, and hip-hop, showcased through the synthesizers and vocal manipulations—Swift's voice is multitracked and, on "Midnight Rain" and "Labyrinth", pitched down to a low register that critics found masculine or androgynous. Powers wrote that Swift's vocals retained a country-influenced "relaxed" timbre but also interpolated hip-hop cadences that resulted in conversational sing-talking. Elements of electronica are demonstrated on "Snow on the Beach" and "Bejeweled", electro-hip-hop on "Lavender Haze", "Midnight Rain", and "Vigilante Shit", and R&B on "Lavender Haze", "Maroon", "Midnight Rain", "The Great War", and "Glitch". "Midnight Rain" and "Labyrinth" also incorporate dubstep-influenced bass and house-and-trap-inspired beats.

In Vulture, Craig Jenkins dubbed Midnights a "genre reset" attempting to hybridize synth-pop and R&B. Two other Vulture critics—the journalist Charlie Harding and the musicologist Nate Sloan—said the album evoked a variety of dance and club genres, such as techno, UK garage, and jungle. This is demonstrated by the Reese bass, a low-pitched synth-bass sound that is incorporated into tracks such as "Lavender Haze", "Anti-Hero", "Question...?", and "Karma". Harding said the Reese bass gave the album a "dark" and "subterranean" feel. Elise Ryan from the Associated Press and Lucy Harbron from Gigwise considered Midnights an experimental album. Ryan deemed it a move toward indie pop, and Andrew Unterberger from Billboard described it as "alt-leaning synth-pop". Ilana Kaplam of the Alternative Press and Stephen Thomas Erlewine of AllMusic said that in addition to the electronic sound, Midnights incorporated alternative elements and contemplative lyricism that evoked Folklore and Evermore.

== Artwork and aesthetics ==
Employing a minimalist design, the standard edition's cover artwork contains a square photo of Swift in blue eye shadow, black eye liner, and red lipstick, holding the flame of a lighter close to her face. The photo is at the bottom right corner, occupying half of the cover, and bordered on the top and left sides by off-white negative space. The tracklist is on the bottom left, and the title Midnights is written in a blue gradient, printed on top of Swift's photo. The typeface used on the album cover is Neue Haas Grotesk.

The tracklist presentation is reminiscent of vinyl album jackets common in the 1970s. Several 1970s cultural items that were listed by journalists as potential reference points for the Midnights cover include the English band Roxy Music's 1974 album Country Life, the French artist Guy Bourdin's photographs for Vogue France, and the English model Jean Shrimpton, as discussed by Jess Cartner-Morley and Alex Bilmes. Several other analyses aligned the Midnights cover with the indie sleaze trend of the 2000s decade; (Note: Attributed to the Dallas Observer, the Alternative Press, and Pitchfork) Rob Sheffield of Rolling Stone named the Ultra Chilled dance CD compilations from the early 2000s as a potential influence. The cover created a trend and was parodied by many brands, celebrities, and athletic teams.

Other promotional visuals for Midnights also feature 1970s aesthetics. The photographs and videos that Swift posted onto social media featured a clock face, family-room furniture with retro upholstery, and a rust velvet curtain in the background. Her wardrobe incorporated embellishments that Vogue identified as "disco sequins" and "corduroy flare". The covers for three other physical editions all feature 1970s memorabilia: a retro piano, a push-button telephone, and a wood-paneled wall. Their reverse sides each portray a quarter sector of a dial and, when assembled together and combined with a clock mechanism sold separately, form a functioning clock. The music videos for "Anti-Hero", "Bejeweled", and "Lavender Haze" feature Swift in 1970s fashion: houndstooth polo sweaters, ribbed knit trousers, and sequined bodysuits. (Note: As noted by Grazia and Vogue)

== Release and promotion ==
Swift extensively used social media to promote Midnights. After the announcement at the MTV Video Music Awards, Swift's website and the canvases of her songs on Spotify were updated with images of a clock. Using the video-sharing platform TikTok, from September 21 to October 7, 2022, she released a 13-episode video series called Midnights Mayhem with Me, where she announced the title of each track in a randomized order per episode. In each episode, Swift rolled a lottery cage containing 13 ping pong balls numbered from 1 to 13, each representing a track of the album; when a ball dropped out, she disclosed the title of the corresponding track through a telephone. On October 17, Swift posted on her social media an itinerary titled Midnights Manifest, which included promotional events she had planned. Swift partnered with Spotify to display some lyrics from Midnights on billboards in five cities: New York, London, São Paulo, Nashville, and Mexico City. Another partnership with Apple Fitness+ included three exercise programs designed around Swift's music, featuring tracks from Midnights.

Although Swift extensively promoted Midnights and announced multiple release pre-orders, she did not conduct press interviews or preview music prior to the album's release. Republic Records released Midnights on October 21, 2022. The standard edition was made available for streaming, download, cassette, four CD variants, and four vinyl LP variants. Target stores exclusively sold a Lavender Edition on CD and vinyl LP, and Capital One distributed a box set that contained the CD and a Swift-branded T-shirt. The 3am Edition was surprise-released onto streaming and digital services three hours after the standard edition. From October 21 to 26, iHeartRadio aired a program called iHeartRadio Brings You Midnights with Taylor, which featured tracks from the album and stories behind the songs told by Swift herself. She appeared, but did not perform, on the talk shows The Tonight Show Starring Jimmy Fallon on October 24 and The Graham Norton Show on October 28.

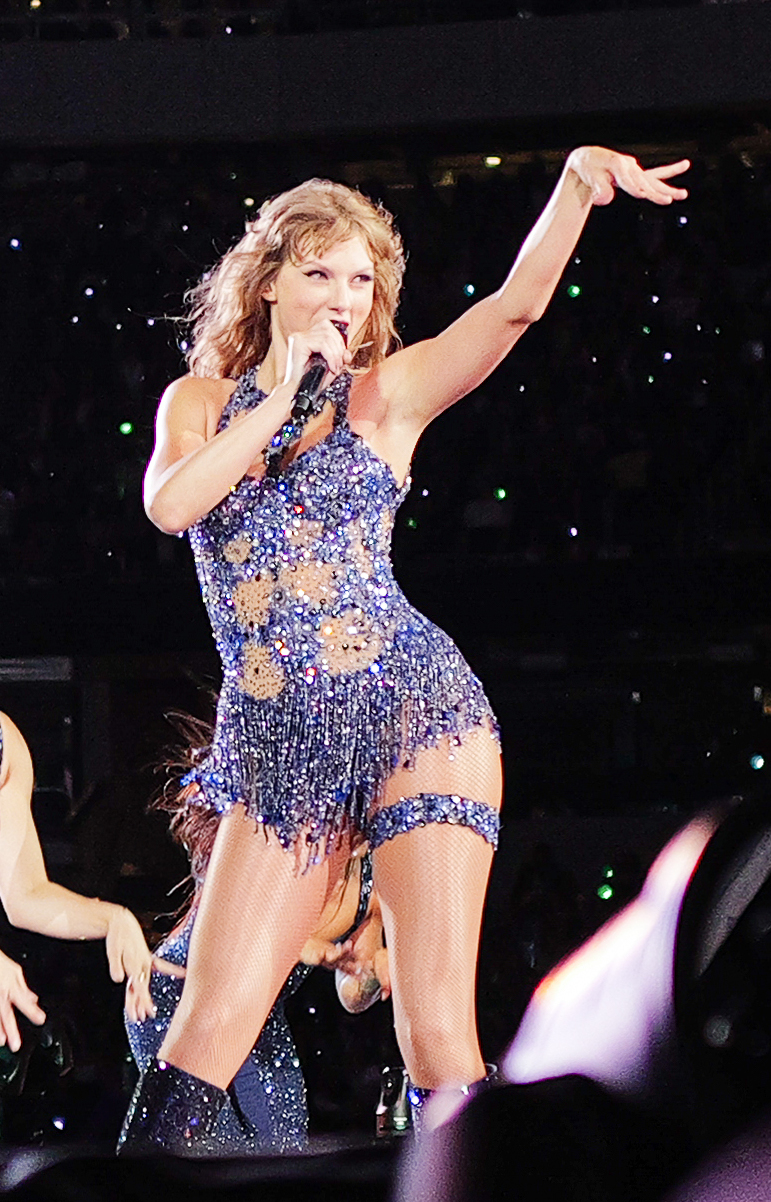
Swift performing on the Eras Tour at SoFi Stadium in August 2023

"Anti-Hero" was released as the album's lead single on October 21, 2022. In the United States, it became the best-selling song of 2022 and made Swift the first artist to have a number-one song on the Radio Songs chart in the 2000s, 2010s, and 2020s decades. "Bejeweled" and "Question...?" were released for limited-time digital download exclusively through Swift's website on October 25. "Snow on the Beach" was issued to US triple-A radio as a single on November 7, 2022, followed by the US pop radio releases of "Lavender Haze" on November 29, 2022, and "Karma" on May 1, 2023. A remix of "Karma" featuring the rapper Ice Spice was released on May 26, 2023. On the US Billboard Hot 100, "Anti-Hero" reached number one, "Lavender Haze" and "Karma" both peaked at number two, and "Snow on the Beach" charted at number four.

The promotional rollout of Midnights received media commentary. Unterberger and Slate's Chris Molanphy described it as a middle ground between a traditional album rollout and the surprise-release strategy of Folklore and Evermore. Molanphy argued that Midnights employed an optimal promotion for every consumption metric: the multiple CD and LP offers would boost physical sales, the limited-time download tracks would increase digital sales, and the surprise 3am Edition release would prompt higher streams. The fact that there were no pre-release singles prompted speculation on the album's sound and content, and the TikTok video series prompted Swift's fans to interpret possible Easter eggs, heightening the anticipation for the album.

To support Midnights and her other albums, Swift embarked on the Eras Tour, which she described as a retrospective journey through her "musical eras". Running from March 2023 to December 2024, the tour spanned 149 dates and visited five continents. It became the first concert tour to gross over $1 billion, totaling $2 billion, the highest-grossing in history. During the run of the tour, a Til Dawn Edition of Midnights containing the bonus track "Hits Different" was released to digital platforms, and a Late Night Edition containing the bonus track "You're Losing Me" was sold as concert–exclusive merchandise starting from the East Rutherford show on May 26, 2023.

== Commercial performance ==
Midnights was a commercial success across all consumption metrics: streaming, digital sales, and physical sales. It broke various records on music streaming platforms. On Spotify, Midnights broke records for the highest single-day streams and the highest single-week streams. It also claimed the highest single-day streams for a pop album and an album released in Dolby Atmos on Apple Music, the highest single-week streams for an album on Amazon Music, and the highest single-day requests on Amazon Alexa. All of its tracks entered the Billboard Global 200 simultaneously; it set the record for the most simultaneous top-10 entries (nine) and made Swift the first artist to occupy the entire top five.

In the United States, Midnights became Swift's record-extending fifth album to sell one million first-week copies after five days of availability. It debuted atop the Billboard 200 with first-week units of 1.578 million, consisting of 1.14 million sales and 549.26 million streams, tying her with Barbra Streisand for the most number-one albums for a female artist (11). Midnights was the best-selling album of 2022, the second-best-selling album of 2023, and the second-most-consumed album of both years. Swift became the first artist to have a yearly best-seller six times since Luminate tracked US music sales in 1991. Midnights spent six weeks atop the Billboard 200, and 68 weeks in the top 10, the longest run in the top 10 for Swift. Its songs, led by "Anti-Hero", made Swift the first artist to occupy the entire top 10 of the Billboard Hot 100 the same week; all 20 tracks from the 3am Edition charted in the top 45. "Anti-Hero" and Midnights marked the fourth time Swift had a number-one album and song simultaneously. It had sold 2.814 million US copies by January 2024. In September 2025, the Recording Industry Association of America (RIAA) certified the album seven-times platinum, denoting seven million album-equivalent units.

Midnights debuted at number one on the album charts in at least 14 countries, including Belgium, Canada, Finland, France, Germany, Italy, Ireland, the Netherlands, New Zealand, Norway, and Sweden. It was Swift's first number-one album in France and Germany and made her the best-selling foreign artist in China of 2022 after selling nearly 250,000 copies within one day. On the Australian charts, Midnights was Swift's 10th consecutive number-one album, and its tracks made her the first artist to have nine songs on the top 10 of the singles chart the same week. In the United Kingdom, Midnights sold over 140,000 units in its first three days to become the fastest-selling album of 2022. It debuted atop the UK Albums Chart with 204,000 units, helping Swift achieve the shortest duration (10 years) for a female act to accumulate nine UK number-one albums. Midnights spent five weeks atop the UK Albums Chart. It sold 80,000 vinyl copies in 2022, the highest annual figure for an album in the 21st century, propelling total UK vinyl sales past CD sales for the first time since 1987.

According to Universal Music Group, the album crossed three million album-equivalent units in its first week and six million in two months. Bloomberg News reported that the album helped generate $230 million in sales for Universal in 2022, accounting for 3% of their annual revenue—the highest from any artist. The International Federation of the Phonographic Industry (IFPI) recognized Midnights as the second-most-consumed album of 2022; it ranked third in pure sales (first in vinyl sales) and fifth in streams; they named Swift the Global Recording Artist of 2022, which made her the first act to win the accolade three times (after 2014 and 2019). In the IFPI's 2023 report, Midnights was the year's fourth-most-consumed album (third in both streams and vinyl sales). As of April 2026, Midnights is the 18th most-streamed album of all time on Spotify. The album has been certified platinum or higher in many countries, including double platinum in Austria, Italy, and Spain; triple platinum in Australia, Denmark, Poland, and the United Kingdom; six-times platinum in New Zealand; and eight-times platinum in Canada.

== Critical reception ==
Professional ratings
Aggregate scores
Source	Rating
AnyDecentMusic?	8.0/10
Metacritic	85/100
Review scores
Source	Rating
AllMusic	4/5 stars
American Songwriter	4.5/5 stars
Entertainment Weekly	B+
The Daily Telegraph	4/5 stars
The Guardian	5/5 stars
The Independent	5/5 stars
NME	4/5 stars
Pitchfork	7.0/10
Rolling Stone	5/5 stars
The Times	4/5 stars

Upon release, Midnights was met with widespread acclaim from music critics. On Metacritic, which assigns a normalized score out of 100 to ratings from mainstream publications, the album received a weighted mean score of 85 based on 28 reviews, indicating "universal acclaim". The review aggregator site AnyDecentMusic? compiled 29 reviews and gave Midnights an average of 8.0 out of 10, based on their assessment of the critical consensus.

Swift's songwriting was a subject of praise. Alex Hopper in American Songwriter said Midnights displayed complex songwriting, and Alexis Petridis in The Guardian found it to be "confident" and contain a "sure-footedness". Ken Tucker of NPR complimented Swift's composition using rhymes "so tightly, so rigorously, that [...] you wonder if she did it on purpose to mess with your mind". Some reviewers commented that her lyrics were more refined and inward. According to NME's Hannah Mylrea, Spin's Bobby Olivier, and The Daily Telegraph's Neil McCormick, the album featured Swift's intimate personal narratives that delved deep into her state of mind. Hirsh commented that while the themes were a continuation of what Swift had explored, the album showcased a newfound maturity with "serene acceptance". Mikael Wood of the Los Angeles Times admired the storytelling lyrics and argued that they blurred the distinction between "what's drawn directly from Swift's real life and what's not". Hopper and Light considered the narrative-driven songwriting on Midnights an influence of Folklore and Evermore; the latter complimented Swift's ability to address a "broad canvas" of emotions that highlighted her mature perspective. For Clash's Matthew Neale, Midnights was a culmination of Swift's songcraft throughout past albums.

Reactions to the production were somewhat polarized; most were complimentary and deemed the sound tasteful. In laudatory reviews, Sheffield, Brittany Spanos from Rolling Stone, and Bilmes dubbed Midnights an "instant classic"; the lattermost called it "the pop album of the year". Ryan and Quinn said the album was a demonstration of masterful musical structures and experimentation; the former wrote that Swift effortlessly combined her sharp lyricism with new musical elements. Under the Radar's Andy Von Pip described the subdued production as elegant, while Johnston and Petridis regarded the sound as nuanced and restrained compared to the mainstream pop sound. McCormick dubbed the album a collection of "clever pop songs" but said it suggested Swift's uncertainty about whether to proceed with "intimate songcraft" or "a commercial juggernaut".

Less enthusiastic reviews complained that Swift and Antonoff's collaboration led to conformity. Jon Caramanica of The New York Times, Chris Richards of The Washington Post and Paul Attard of Slant Magazine deemed Midnights uninventive and too similar to Swift's past music. Moreland, Erlewine, and The Line of Best Fit's Paul Bridgewater agreed, but they complimented the album as cohesive. Powers appreciated some sonic experimentation that attempted to innovate Swift's first-person songwriting but felt that it sometimes had a "half-finished quality". For Carl Wilson of Slate and Spencer Kornhaber of The Atlantic, Midnights at first seemed dull but revealed texture and substance after multiple plays; Robert Christgau believed that this "textural" approach made it less tunefully defined than Swift's previous albums. Helen Brown of The Independent wrote that the "subtle melodies" took time to "sink their claws in" and brought a rich listening experience with "feline vocal stealth and assured lyrical control". Will Hodgkinson of The Times said that despite some "off-putting" vocal treatments, Midnights was an appealing "old-fashioned singer-songwriter album" with resonant songs.

== Awards and rankings ==
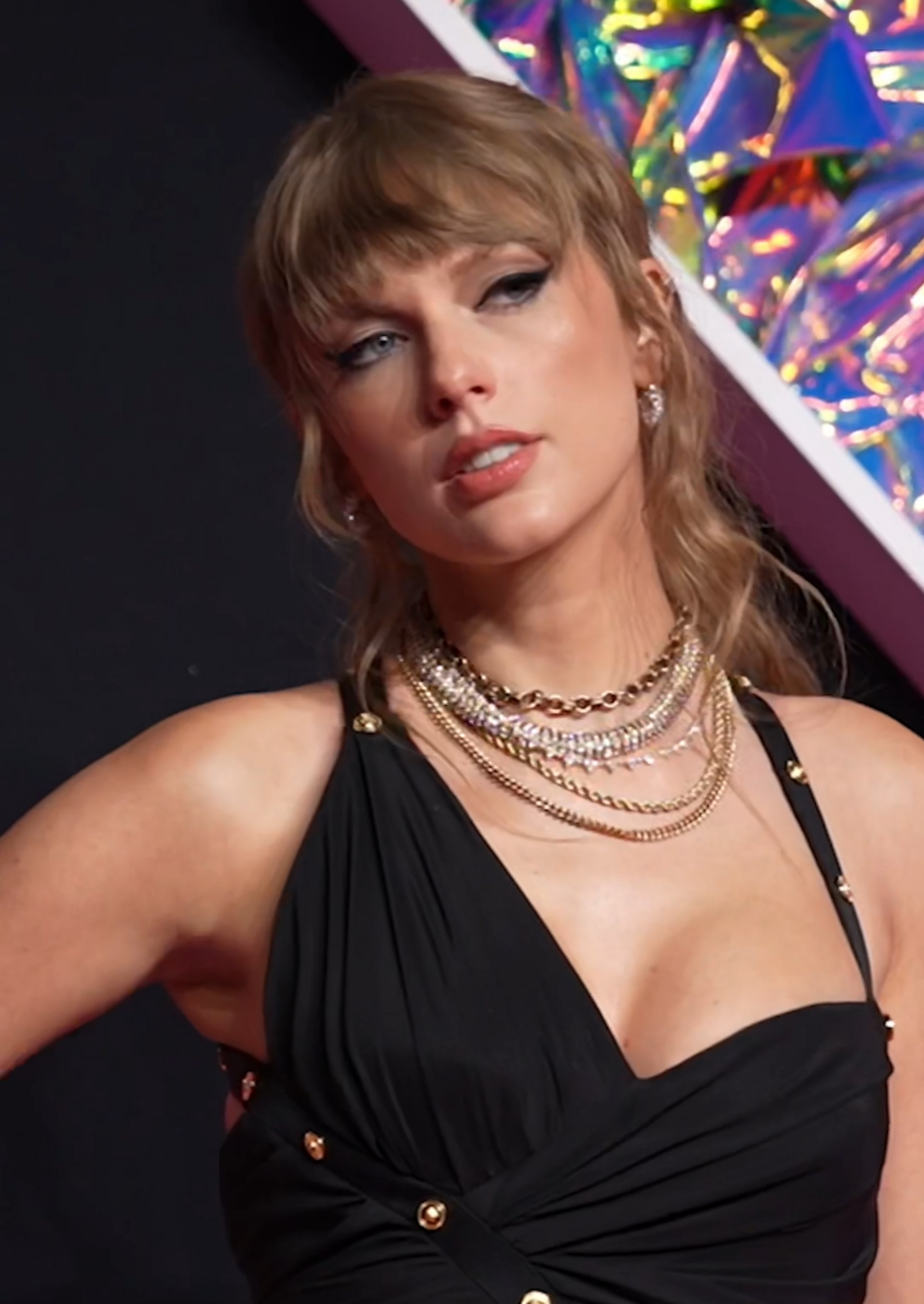
Swift at the 2023 MTV Video Music Awards, where she won nine awards for Midnights and its songs

In the United States, Midnights won Album of the Year at the 2022 People's Choice Awards, Favorite Album at the 2023 Nickelodeon Kids' Choice Awards, Pop Album of the Year at the 2023 iHeartRadio Music Awards, and Album of the Year at the 2023 MTV Video Music Awards, where the Midnights songs helped Swift win eight other awards, including Artist of the Year. At the 2024 Grammy Awards, Midnights won Best Pop Vocal Album and Album of the Year. It was Swift's fourth win for Album of the Year, making her the artist with the most wins in history. (Note: Swift had won Album of the Year with Fearless in 2010, 1989 in 2016, and Folklore in 2021) It also marked Swift's sixth nomination in that category—an all-time record for a female artist, tied with Barbra Streisand. The album was nominated for Top Billboard 200 Album at the 2023 Billboard Music Awards.

Midnights also won awards at the NetEase Cloud Music Awards in China, the Asian Pop Music Awards and the RTHK International Pop Poll Awards in Hong Kong, the Gold Disc Awards in Japan, the Fonogram Awards in Hungary, the Los 40 Music Awards in Spain, and the Danish Music Awards in Denmark. At the 2023 ARIA Music Awards in Australia, it helped Swift win Most Popular International Artist. It earned nominations at the Capricho Awards in Brazil, the Juno Awards in Canada, and the Gaffa Awards in Denmark.

Midnights appeared on publications' lists of the best albums of 2022. It was featured in the top five by Rolling Stone, Billboard, the Los Angeles Times, People, PopMatters, and USA Today, and the top 10 by Hot Press, The Independent, MusicOMH, and The Times. Publications that featured Midnights in the top 50 include BrooklynVegan, Clash, Consequence, Gaffa, The Guardian, The Line of Best Fit, NME, Paste, Slant Magazine, and Under the Radar. It was also included in unranked lists by AllMusic, British GQ, the Alternative Press, and Uproxx. On individual critics' lists, Midnights was ranked first by Willman and second by Sheffield.

== Impact ==
Midnights received extensive press attention around its release. The Guardian's Laura Snapes commented that the album was "likely to hang around longer" than other "superstar releases" by Swift's contemporaries. She attributed this to Swift's popularity on streaming services and how she overturned the negative press to curate a positive public image since her 2017 album Reputation. In Fortune, Ashley Lutz argued that Swift's marketing strategy for Midnights proved she was a "business and marketing genius" akin to the Marvel Cinematic Universe superhero franchise. For Snapes and Billboard's Katie Atkinson, Midnights came at a point when the public became invested in Swift's music after the critical success and reevaluation she received with the 2020 albums Folklore and Evermore and the 2021 re-recordings of Fearless and Red.

Publications said the album's commercial success attested to Swift's longevity in the music industry. According to Billboard, it was the only album in 2022 that succeeded "evenly" across every consumption metric, namely streaming, album sales, and song downloads. Five Billboard journalists collectively agreed that Swift, upon Midnights' release, was "the biggest pop star in the world right now", and Yahr deemed 2022 a year of "all-Taylor all the time". Molanphy argued that by employing savvy business tactics that tackled the constantly evolving chart rules, she broke previously "unthinkable" records by the likes of the Beatles and Drake, which was "mind-blowing" for a musician in the "17th year" of her career. For The Guardian economics journalist Greg Jericho, it was a "wonderful" feat that Swift remained culturally relevant "18 years into a recording career", a mark that surpassed the peak popularity of such musicians as the Rolling Stones, David Bowie, Bob Dylan, Bruce Springsteen, and U2. (Note: Swift began her recording career at 16 with her self-titled debut album in 2006. The discrepancy in years calculated by Molanphy (17) and Jericho (18) might be due to some misunderstandings.)

Unterberger said the physical sales of Midnights were "not seen in decades", and Anna Nicolaou in the Financial Times said they were unseen since the "1990s boy bands" era, labeling Swift "the last pop superstar". The music publisher Matt Pincus called Swift "basically an intellectual property franchise [... like] a DC movie". Noting a 2021 article from The New York Times that asked "if Adele couldn't sell more than a million albums in a single week, could any artist?" after her album 30 missed the mark, Rolling Stone's Ethan Millman responded that Swift "has once again moved the goalposts regarding what the music industry can see as possible from a major pop star". Swift shared on The Tonight Show with Jimmy Fallon that she was astounded by the success: "I'm feeling very overwhelmed by the fans love for the record. I'm 32, so we're considered geriatric pop stars."

Billboard commented in November 2022 that although the commercial success of Midnights was undisputable, "the legacy of the album within [Swift's] catalog [...] remains to be seen". Molanphy observed that when the initial reviews were out, "few seem to think Midnights is Swift's very best album" and "nobody seems to agree on what [its] best or worst songs are". Within one year of its release, on the rankings of Swift's 10 studio albums, Midnights appeared fifth on NME and Entertainment Weekly and sixth on Paste, Spin, and Slant Magazine. In an October 2023 article for The Guardian, Snapes dubbed the album Swift's "first consolidation effort" that signaled "a more sustainable, experimental, adult kind of music career".

== Track listing ==
Standard edition
No.	Title	Writer(s)	Producer(s)	Length
1.	"Lavender Haze"	Taylor Swift; Jack Antonoff; Zoë Kravitz; Mark Spears; Jahaan Sweet; Sam Dew	Swift; Antonoff; Sounwave; Sweet; Braxton Cook^{[a]}	3:22
2.	"Maroon"	Swift; Antonoff	Swift; Antonoff	3:38
3.	"Anti-Hero"	Swift; Antonoff	Swift; Antonoff	3:20
4.	"Snow on the Beach" (featuring Lana Del Rey)	Swift; Del Rey; Antonoff	Swift; Antonoff	4:16
5.	"You're on Your Own, Kid"	Swift; Antonoff	Swift; Antonoff	3:14
6.	"Midnight Rain"	Swift; Antonoff	Swift; Antonoff	2:54
7.	"Question...?"	Swift; Antonoff	Swift; Antonoff	3:30
8.	"Vigilante Shit"	Swift	Swift; Antonoff	2:44
9.	"Bejeweled"	Swift; Antonoff	Swift; Antonoff	3:14
10.	"Labyrinth"	Swift; Antonoff	Swift; Antonoff	4:07
11.	"Karma"	Swift; Antonoff; Spears; Sweet; Keanu Torres	Swift; Antonoff; Sounwave; Keanu Beats; Sweet^{[b]}	3:24
12.	"Sweet Nothing"	Swift; William Bowery	Swift; Antonoff	3:08
13.	"Mastermind"	Swift; Antonoff	Swift; Antonoff	3:11
Total length:				44:02

Lavender edition
No.	Title	Writer(s)	Producer(s)	Length
14.	"Hits Different"	Swift; Antonoff; Aaron Dessner	Swift; Antonoff; Dessner	3:54
15.	"You're on Your Own, Kid" (Strings remix)	Swift; Antonoff	Swift; Antonoff	3:20
16.	"Sweet Nothing" (Piano remix)	Swift; Bowery	Swift; Antonoff	3:28
Total length:				54:50

3am edition
No.	Title	Writer(s)	Producer(s)	Length
14.	"The Great War"	Swift; Dessner	Swift; Dessner	4:00
15.	"Bigger Than the Whole Sky"	Swift	Swift; Antonoff	3:38
16.	"Paris"	Swift; Antonoff	Swift; Antonoff	3:16
17.	"High Infidelity"	Swift; Dessner	Swift; Dessner	3:51
18.	"Glitch"	Swift; Antonoff; Spears; Dew	Swift; Antonoff; Sounwave	2:28
19.	"Would've, Could've, Should've"	Swift; Dessner	Swift; Dessner	4:20
20.	"Dear Reader"	Swift; Antonoff	Swift; Antonoff	3:45
Total length:				69:20

Til Dawn edition
No.	Title	Writer(s)	Producer(s)	Length
21.	"Hits Different"	Swift; Antonoff; Dessner	Swift; Antonoff; Dessner	3:54
22.	"Snow on the Beach" (featuring More Lana Del Rey)	Swift; Del Rey; Antonoff	Swift; Antonoff	3:50
23.	"Karma" (featuring Ice Spice)	Swift; Antonoff; Isis Gaston; Ephrem Lopez; Spears; Sweet; Keanu Torres	Swift; Antonoff; Sounwave; Keanu Beats; Sweet^{[b]}	3:22
Total length:				81:26

Late Night edition
No.	Title	Writer(s)	Producer(s)	Length
14.	"The Great War"	Swift; Dessner	Swift; Dessner	4:00
15.	"Bigger Than the Whole Sky"	Swift	Swift; Antonoff	3:38
16.	"High Infidelity"	Swift; Dessner	Swift; Dessner	3:51
17.	"Would've, Could've, Should've"	Swift; Dessner	Swift; Dessner	4:20
18.	"Dear Reader"	Swift; Antonoff	Swift; Antonoff	3:45
19.	"You're Losing Me" (From the Vault)	Swift; Antonoff	Swift; Antonoff	4:38
20.	"Snow on the Beach" (featuring More Lana Del Rey)	Swift; Del Rey; Antonoff	Swift; Antonoff	3:50
21.	"Karma" (featuring Ice Spice)	Swift; Antonoff; Isis Gaston; Ephrem Lopez; Spears; Sweet; Keanu Torres	Swift; Antonoff; Sounwave; Keanu Beats; Sweet^{[b]}	3:22
Total length:				77:06

=== Notes ===
- ^{^[a]}signifies an additional producer
- ^{^[b]}signifies a co-producer
- "Question...?" contains a sample of "Out of the Woods", written and produced by Swift and Antonoff.
- Japanese CD standard edition includes the Lavender edition tracks.

== Personnel ==
Musicians

- Taylor Swift – vocals
- Jack Antonoff – percussion, programming, synthesizers (all tracks); background vocals (1, 3–5, 7, 9, 10, 13), drums (1, 3, 4, 6, 11–13), Mellotron (1, 3–5, 7), Wurlitzer organ (1, 3, 8), bass (2–5, 9, 15, 18, 20), electric guitar (2, 4, 5, 10, 12, 13, 15, 17, 18, 20), piano (2, 12, 15, 16, 20), acoustic guitar (3, 4, 5, 9, 15), crowd noises (7), Omnichord (11), slide guitar (15)
- Aaron Dessner – percussion (14, 17), keyboards (14, 17), synth bass (14), piano (14, 17), electric guitar (14, 19), synthesizer (17, 19), acoustic guitar (17), bass guitar (19), harmonica (19)
- Sam Dew – background vocals (1, 18)
- Zoë Kravitz – background vocals (1, 18)
- Jahaan Sweet – synth pads (1, 11); bass, flute, synthesizer (1); keyboards (11),
- Sounwave – programming (1, 11)
- Dominic Rivinius – snare drum (1), drums (7–8)
- Evan Smith – saxophone (2, 12, 13); clarinet, flute, organ (2, 12); synthesizer (4, 5, 7–9, 13, 16), percussion (16)
- Bobby Hawk – violin (3, 4, 13)
- Dylan O'Brien – drums (4), crowd noises (7)
- Lana Del Rey – vocals (4)
- Rachel Antonoff – crowd noises (7)
- Austin Swift – crowd noises (7)
- Sean Hutchinson – drums (5, 7), percussion (5)
- Mikey Freedom Hart – keyboards (9); programming (12–13), synthesizer (12–13, 16), theremin, organ (16)
- Keanu Beats – synthesizer (11)
- Michael Riddleberger – drums (13)
- Zem Audu – saxophone (13)
- Kyle Resnick – trumpet (14)
- Yuki Numata Resnick – violin (14)
- Benjamin Lanz – drums, trombone (17)
- James Krivchenia – drums (17)
- Bryce Dessner – electric guitar (19)
- Bryan Devendorf – drums (19)
- James McAlister – drums (19), synthesizer (19)
- Thomas Bartlett – keyboards (19), synthesizer (17, 19)

Technical

- Jack Antonoff – engineering
- Laura Sisk – engineering
- Şerban Ghenea – mixing
- Bryce Bordone – mixing assistance
- Randy Merrill – mastering
- Jahaan Sweet – engineering (1, 11)
- Ken Lewis – engineering (1, 7, 8)
- Evan Smith – engineering (2, 4, 5, 7–9, 12, 13)
- Jon Gautier – engineering (3, 13)
- Dave Gross – engineering (4)
- Sean Hutchinson – engineering (5, 7)
- David Hart – engineering (9, 13)
- Sounwave – engineering (11)
- Keanu Beats – engineering (11)
- Michael Riddleberger – engineering (13)
- Zem Audu – engineering (13)
- John Rooney – engineering assistance
- Jon Sher – engineering assistance
- Megan Searl – engineering assistance
- Jonathan Garcia – engineering assistance (1, 7, 8)
- Mark Aguilar – engineering assistance (1, 11)
- Jacob Spitzer – engineering assistance (4)
- Laurene Marquez – additional engineer
- James McAlister – drums programming (14, 17, 19)
- Jonathan Low – mixer, engineering (17, 19)
- Bella Blasko – engineering (14, 17, 19)
- Justin Vernon – additional engineer (19)
- Thomas Bartlett – additional engineer (17, 19)

== Charts ==
=== Weekly charts ===
Weekly chart performance
Chart (2022–2023)	Peak position
Argentine Albums (CAPIF)	1
Australian Albums (ARIA)	1
Austrian Albums (Ö3 Austria)	1
Belgian Albums (Ultratop Flanders)	1
Belgian Albums (Ultratop Wallonia)	1
Canadian Albums (Billboard)	1
Croatian International Albums (HDU)	2
Czech Albums (ČNS IFPI)	1
Danish Albums (Hitlisten)	1
Dutch Albums (Album Top 100)	1
Finnish Albums (Suomen virallinen lista)	1
French Albums (SNEP)	1
German Albums (Offizielle Top 100)	1
Greek Albums (IFPI)	1
Hungarian Albums (MAHASZ)	4
Icelandic Albums (Tónlistinn)	1
Irish Albums (Official Charts)	1
Italian Albums (FIMI)	1
Japanese Albums (Oricon)	7
Japanese Combined Albums (Oricon)	7
Japanese Hot Albums (Billboard Japan)	8
Lithuanian Albums (AGATA)	1
New Zealand Albums (RMNZ)	1
Norwegian Albums (VG-lista)	1
Polish Albums (ZPAV)	4
Portuguese Albums (AFP)	1
Scottish Albums (Official Charts)	1
Slovak Albums (ČNS IFPI)	1
South Korean Albums (Circle)	81
Spanish Albums (Promusicae)	1
Swedish Albums (Sverigetopplistan)	1
Swiss Albums (Schweizer Hitparade)	1
UK Albums (Official Charts)	1
US Billboard 200	1

=== Monthly chart ===
Monthly chart performance
Chart (2022)	Position
Uruguayan Albums (CUD)	1

=== Year-end charts ===
2022 year-end chart performance
Chart (2022)	Position
Australian Albums (ARIA)	1
Austrian Albums (Ö3 Austria)	3
Belgian Albums (Ultratop Flanders)	11
Belgian Albums (Ultratop Wallonia)	51
Canadian Albums (Billboard)	14
Danish Albums (Hitlisten)	20
Dutch Albums (Album Top 100)	3
French Albums (SNEP)	95
German Albums (Offizielle Top 100)	4
Hungarian Albums (MAHASZ)	31
Icelandic Albums (Tónlistinn)	29
Italian Albums (FIMI)	56
Japanese Download Albums (Billboard Japan)	97
Lithuanian Albums (AGATA)	62
New Zealand Albums (RMNZ)	2
Norwegian Albums (VG-lista)	10
Polish Albums (ZPAV)	61
Portuguese Albums (AFP)	9
Spanish Albums (PROMUSICAE)	9
Swedish Albums (Sverigetopplistan)	25
Swiss Albums (Schweizer Hitparade)	9
UK Albums (OC)	3
US Billboard 200	4

2023 year-end chart performance
Chart (2023)	Position
Australian Albums (ARIA)	2
Austrian Albums (Ö3 Austria)	3
Belgian Albums (Ultratop Flanders)	6
Belgian Albums (Ultratop Wallonia)	51
Canadian Albums (Billboard)	2
Croatian International Albums (HDU)	7
Danish Albums (Hitlisten)	8
Dutch Albums (Album Top 100)	2
French Albums (SNEP)	57
German Albums (Offizielle Top 100)	9
Hungarian Albums (MAHASZ)	25
Icelandic Albums (Tónlistinn)	28
Italian Albums (FIMI)	46
New Zealand Albums (RMNZ)	3
Polish Albums (ZPAV)	39
Portuguese Albums (AFP)	3
Spanish Albums (PROMUSICAE)	14
Swedish Albums (Sverigetopplistan)	12
Swiss Albums (Schweizer Hitparade)	12
UK Albums (OCC)	2
US Billboard 200	2

2024 year-end chart performance
Chart (2024)	Position
Australian Albums (ARIA)	10
Austrian Albums (Ö3 Austria)	8
Belgian Albums (Ultratop Flanders)	12
Belgian Albums (Ultratop Wallonia)	142
Canadian Albums (Billboard)	10
Croatian International Albums (HDU)	10
Danish Albums (Hitlisten)	46
Dutch Albums (Album Top 100)	29
French Albums (SNEP)	97
German Albums (Offizielle Top 100)	11
Global Albums (IFPI)	15
Hungarian Albums (MAHASZ)	83
New Zealand Albums (RMNZ)	13
Polish Albums (ZPAV)	100
Portuguese Albums (AFP)	13
Spanish Albums (PROMUSICAE)	44
Swedish Albums (Sverigetopplistan)	52
Swiss Albums (Schweizer Hitparade)	49
UK Albums (OC)	22
US Billboard 200	10

2025 year-end chart performance
Chart (2025)	Position
Australian Albums (ARIA)	65
Belgian Albums (Ultratop Flanders)	79
Canadian Albums (Billboard)	34
German Albums (Offizielle Top 100)	68
UK Albums (OC)	72
US Billboard 200	46

== Certifications and sales ==
Certifications with pure sales where available
Region	Certification	Certified units/sales
Australia (ARIA)	3× Platinum	210,000^{‡}
Austria (IFPI Austria)	2× Platinum	30,000^{‡}
Belgium (BRMA)	Gold	10,000^{‡}
Canada (Music Canada)	8× Platinum	640,000^{‡}
Denmark (IFPI Danmark)	3× Platinum	60,000^{‡}
France (SNEP)	Platinum	118,000
Germany (BVMI)	Platinum	200,000^{‡}
Italy (FIMI)	2× Platinum	100,000^{‡}
Mexico (AMPROFON)	Platinum	140,000^{‡}
New Zealand (RMNZ)	6× Platinum	90,000^{‡}
Norway (IFPI Norway)	Gold	10,000^{‡}
Poland (ZPAV)	3× Platinum	60,000^{‡}
Portugal (AFP)	Platinum	7,000^{‡}
Spain (Promusicae)	2× Platinum	80,000^{‡}
Switzerland (IFPI Switzerland)	Gold	10,000^{‡}
United Kingdom (BPI)	3× Platinum	900,000^{‡}
United States (RIAA)	7× Platinum	7,000,000^{‡}
^{‡} Sales+streaming figures based on certification alone.

== Release history ==
Release dates and formats for Midnights
Initial release date	Edition	Format(s)	Ref.
October 21, 2022	Standard	Digital download; streaming; CD; vinyl LP; cassette	
October 21, 2022	Lavender Edition / Japanese Edition	CD (Note: The Lavender Edition CDs and all Japanese CDs, include three exclusive bonus tracks not available for the matching release on vinyl LP format. In the United States, all Lavender Edition formats are exclusively available through Target.)	
October 21, 2022	3am	Digital download; streaming	
May 26, 2023	Late Night	CD; digital download (Note: Only available for 24 hours exclusively via Swift's website)	
May 26, 2023	Til Dawn	Digital download; streaming	

== See also ==
- List of Billboard 200 number-one albums of 2022
- List of Billboard 200 number-one albums of 2023
- List of number-one albums from the 2020s (Denmark)
- List of number-one albums from the 2020s (New Zealand)
- List of number-one albums of the 2020s (Czech Republic)
- List of number-one albums of 2022 (Australia)
- List of number-one albums of 2023 (Australia)
- List of number-one albums of 2024 (Australia)
- List of number-one albums of 2022 (Belgium)
- List of number-one albums of 2022 (Canada)
- List of number-one albums of 2022 (Ireland)
- List of number-one albums of 2023 (Ireland)
- List of number-one albums of 2022 (Portugal)
- List of number-one albums of 2022 (Spain)
- List of number-one hits of 2022 (Austria)
- List of number-one hits of 2022 (Denmark)
- List of number-one hits of 2022 (France)
- List of number-one hits of 2022 (Germany)
- List of number-one hits of 2022 (Switzerland)
- List of number-one singles and albums in Sweden of 2022
- List of UK Albums Chart number ones of the 2020s
- Milestones and achievements for albums on Spotify
