= Hits Different =

2022 song by Taylor Swift

Song by Taylor Swift

from the album Midnights (Lavender Edition)
- Released: October 21, 2022
- Studio: Long Pond, Hudson Valley; Rough Customer, Brooklyn; Electric Lady, New York; Conway Recording, Los Angeles; Sharp Sonics, Los Angeles
- Genre: Pop rock
- Length: 3:54
- Label: Republic
- Songwriters: Taylor Swift; Jack Antonoff; Aaron Dessner
- Producers: Taylor Swift; Jack Antonoff; Aaron Dessner

Audio video
- "Hits Different" on YouTube

"Hits Different" is a song by the American singer-songwriter Taylor Swift. It was first released as a bonus track on the CD-only Lavender Edition of her tenth studio album, Midnights, on October 21, 2022. The track was released for download and streaming as part of the Til Dawn Edition on May 26, 2023. Written and produced by Swift, Jack Antonoff, and Aaron Dessner, "Hits Different" is a pop rock tune with lyrics that reflect on a past relationship and contain references to some of Swift's other songs. Critics complimented the humorous tone of its lyrics and found the production catchy.

After it was released for streaming, "Hits Different" peaked within the top 20 in Australia, Canada, Ireland, New Zealand, the Philippines, Singapore, and the United Kingdom. It peaked at number 27 on the US Billboard Hot 100 and number 18 on the Billboard Global 200. Swift performed "Hits Different" as a "surprise song" on the Chicago, London and New Orleans stops of her sixth headlining concert tour, the Eras Tour (2023-2024).

== Background and recording ==
Taylor Swift announced her tenth studio album at the 2022 MTV Video Music Awards on August 28, 2022. She later revealed the name of the album, Midnights, and its album cover on social networks but the tracklist was not immediately revealed. On a video via her Instagram account on September 6, titled "The making of Midnights", Swift revealed that Jack Antonoff, who had worked with her before on her five studio albums since 1989 (2014), was a producer on the album. They wrote and produced "Hits Different" with Aaron Dessner. Both Antonoff and Dessner are responsible for the track's instrumentation, putting a ray of guitars and synths to the mix, with the former also playing percussion, bass, and piano. Other musicians included James McAlister (drum kit, synth sequencing), Sean Hutchinson (drums, percussion), Evan Smith (synths), and Thomas "Doveman" Bartlett (Prophet X synth, Teenage Engineering OP-1). The song was recorded across five recording studios located in the United States: Los Angeles-based Conway Recording and Sharp Sonics, Electric Lady, Rough Customer and Long Pond in New York. The track was mixed by Serban Ghenea, assisted by Bryce Bordone, at MixStar Studios in Virginia Beach, Virginia, and masted by Randy Merrill at Sterling Studios in Edgewater, New Jersey.

== Music and lyrics ==
"Hits Different"
A sample of "Hits Different"; Courteney Larocca of Insider opined that Swift's cadence in the second verse evoked the 1990s songs Alanis Morissette's "Ironic" (1996) and Faith Hill's "This Kiss" (1998).

"Hits Different" is 3 minutes and 54 seconds long. It is a buoyant pop rock song. In an article published in Business Insider, Callie Ahlgrim and Courteney Larocca described the soundscape of "Hits Different" as "warm and triumphant like a montage about falling in love, or finding freedom in a big city", although it depicts a reflection over a past relationship. Larocca described it as a song that evokes the country pop sound of the late 1990s and early 2000s by country crossover acts such as Shania Twain, Alanis Morissette, and Faith Hill. Rob Sheffield of Rolling Stone said the song features plenty of "sun-kissed California rock guitar", while Jason Lipshutz of Billboard said that the "shimmering guitar and fizzy emotion" create "a sense of wanderlust" reminiscent of Swift's 2012 album Red. Critics compared the "drunken display of heartbreak" to "Death by a Thousand Cuts" from Swift's 2019 album Lover, and the lyrics' comical nature to Drake's 2011 single "Marvins Room".

An emotional breakup song, "Hits Different" contains "funny" lyrics and nods to Swift's 2006 track "Our Song". The first verse pictures an image of a heartbreak with an introduction from the singer: "I washed my hands of us at the club / You made a mess of me". She imagines her past lover with a different partner, which makes her vomit. In the chorus, Swift makes a glimpse why she feels this way, by singing: "It hits different 'cause it's you." The second verse reveals her mindset regarding the ray of her previous relationships, even calling most of them "Kens", to highlight their interchangeability. She refers to past splits as "freeing like summer", and sings that her friends recoil from her, since she complains about her situation too much.

During the "tragic" bridge, Swift expresses her continuous personal connection to the past lover's items. Callie Ahlgrim of Business Insider likened a quote from this portion of the song―"Dreams of your hair and your stare and sense of belief in the good in the world"―to Evermore album tracks "Gold Rush" and "Dorothea", since both of them contain references to dreaming. Another reference to the former song is found in the end of the bridge, when Swift calls the subject an "argumentative, antithetical dream girl", which is reminiscent of the lyric "At dinner parties, I call you out on your contrarian shit", since "argumentative" and "contrarian" are synonyms. It is followed by a third verse, where she hears someone turning a key of her door, hoping it is them, before realizing it might be an intervention towards her.

== Release and performances ==
"Hits Different" features as a bonus track on deluxe editions of Midnights, including a Target-exclusive CD Lavender Edition released on October 21, 2022, and a digital Til Dawn Edition released on May 26, 2023. The digital release of "Hits Different" on streaming platforms made it available to chart. On the US Billboard Hot 100, it debuted and peaked at number 27 for the week ending June 10, 2023. The track also landed on other Billboard-curated charts, such as Canadian Hot 100 (19), Global 200 (18), and Philippines Songs (8). Elsewhere, it peaked at number 18 on the UK Singles Chart and number 16 on the ARIA Singles Chart.

On June 4, 2023, at the Chicago stop as part of her Eras Tour, Swift performed "Hits Different" on acoustic guitar as a "surprise song". Stereogum's Tom Breihan reported that the performance was a "huge, euphoric singalong". Billboard and Parade noted that Swift messed up some lyrics. She sang the track again two times as part of a mash-up with her songs "Death by a Thousand Cuts" (2019) on June 21, 2024, at the tour's London stop and "Welcome to New York" (2014) on October 26, 2024, at the tour's New Orleans stop.

== Critical reception ==
Having been described as a "fan favorite", "Hits Different" received acclaim from music critics, with Billboard's Ashley Iasimone calling it "excellent", and Alex Hopper from American Songwriter dubbing it as a "breakup anthem". Carl Wilson from Slate said that "Hits Different" is the best bonus track of Midnights because it "melodically and lyrically has real 'old Taylor' verve", but he also agreed that the track would have been out of place on the standard track-list. Opining that it sounds "unlike anything on Midnights", Larocca dubbed its chorus as one of the "catchiest" on the album. Additionally, she compared the song's release strategy to "New Romantics" from 1989, since both of them first appeared on the physical deluxe editions of their respective albums, whilst being one of the "best" tracks.

Following its release for digital download and streaming, Stereogum ranked "Hits Different" the third best new song of the week of June 2, 2023, naming it a "falsely chipper" sequel of Swift's 2014 single "Blank Space" with "funneling self-lacerating 'Anti-Hero' vibes". In Sheffield's ranking of all the songs in Swift's discography, "Hits Different" placed 46th; he described its lyrics as "wildly funny". Michele Mendez of Elite Daily described it as an "emotional breakup song perfect for anyone in need of some sonic comfort". Rolling Stone's Larisha Paul wrote that in the song "heartbreak feels fresh" and its bridge depicts "wasteland of all the things that remind the singer of the relationship's end". Maya Georgia, also from Rolling Stone, wrote that the song "chronicles a once-in-a-lifetime loss against an addictively jubilant production, reminiscent of early-2000s pop", and praised its bridge in particular. In a less favorable review, Kyle Denis of Billboard opined that the track is "enjoyable but feels bland in comparison to the [standard] album's strongest tracks".

== Credits and personnel ==
Credits are adapted from the liner notes of Midnights (Lavender Edition).

Recording locations

- Recorded at Long Pond (Hudson Valley), Electric Lady Studios (New York City), Rough Customer Studio (Brooklyn), Conway Recording Studios (Los Angeles), and Sharp Sonics Studios (Los Angeles)
- Mixed at MixStar Studios (Virginia Beach, Virginia)
- Mastered at Sterling Sound (Edgewater, New Jersey)
- Sean Hutchinson's performance was recorded by himself at Hutchinson Sound (Brooklyn).
- Evan Smith's performance was recorded by herself at Pleasure Hill Recording (Portland, Maine).
- Doveman's performance was recorded at The Dwelling (New York City).

Personnel

- Taylor Swift – vocals, songwriting, production
- Jack Antonoff – songwriting, production, programming, percussion, bass, acoustic guitar, electric guitar, synths, piano, recording
- Aaron Dessner – songwriting, production, bass guitar, electric guitar, Juno synth, Prophet X synth, Yamaha synth, MS-20, recording
- James McAlister – drum kit, synth sequencing
- Sean Hutchinson – drums, percussion
- Evan Smith – synths
- Thomas "Doveman" Bartlett – Prophet X synth, OP-1
- Jonathan Low – recording

- Laura Sisk – recording
- Jon Sher – assistance engineering
- John Rooney – assistance engineering
- Lauren Marquez – assistance engineering
- Megan Searl – assistance engineering
- Bella Blasko – assistance engineering
- Serban Ghenea – mixing
- Bryce Bordone – assistance mix engineering
- Randy Merrill – mastering

== Charts ==
Chart performance for "Hits Different"
Chart (2023)	Peak position
Australia (ARIA)	16
Canada Hot 100 (Billboard)	19
Global 200 (Billboard)	18
Greece International (IFPI)	34
Ireland (IRMA)	13
New Zealand (Recorded Music NZ)	14
Philippines (Billboard)	8
Singapore (RIAS)	15
UK Singles (Official Charts)	18
US Billboard Hot 100	27

== Certifications ==
Certifications for "Hits Different"
Region	Certification	Certified units/sales
Australia (ARIA)	Platinum	70,000^{‡}
Brazil (Pro-Música Brasil)	Platinum	40,000^{‡}
New Zealand (RMNZ)	Gold	15,000^{‡}
United Kingdom (BPI)	Silver	200,000^{‡}
^{‡} Sales+streaming figures based on certification alone.
