= Rebound (dating) =

Period following the breakup of a relationship

A rebound is an undefined period following the breakup of a romantic and/or sexual relationship.

== Description ==
The term's use dates back to at least the 1830s, when Mary Russell Mitford wrote of "nothing so easy as catching a heart on the rebound".

=== Rebound relationship ===
The term may also refer to a romantic relationship that a person has during the rebound period, or to the partner in such a relationship. When a serious relationship ends badly, these partners suffer from complex emotional stresses of detachment. This, in combination with the need to move forward, leads previous partners to have uncommitted relations called rebounds. Common confusion exists around the extended duration of rebound periods; simply put, one's critical core values and love are often still gravitated and polarized towards a particular person (i.e. one's previous partner) thereby preventing the overall development and accurate assessment of feelings for others during this period of time (the rebound) because true love requires complete mental-emotional commitment.

=== Psychology ===
Someone who is 'on the rebound', or recently out of a serious dating relationship, is popularly believed to be psychologically incapable of making reasonable decisions regarding suitable partners due to emotional neediness, lingering feelings toward the old partner, or unresolved problems from the previous relationship. Rebound relationships are believed to be short-lived due to one partner's emotional instability and desire to distract themselves from a painful breakup. Those emerging from serious relationships are often advised to avoid serious dating until their tumultuous emotions have calmed.
