= Lottery machine =

Mechanical or electronic random number generator

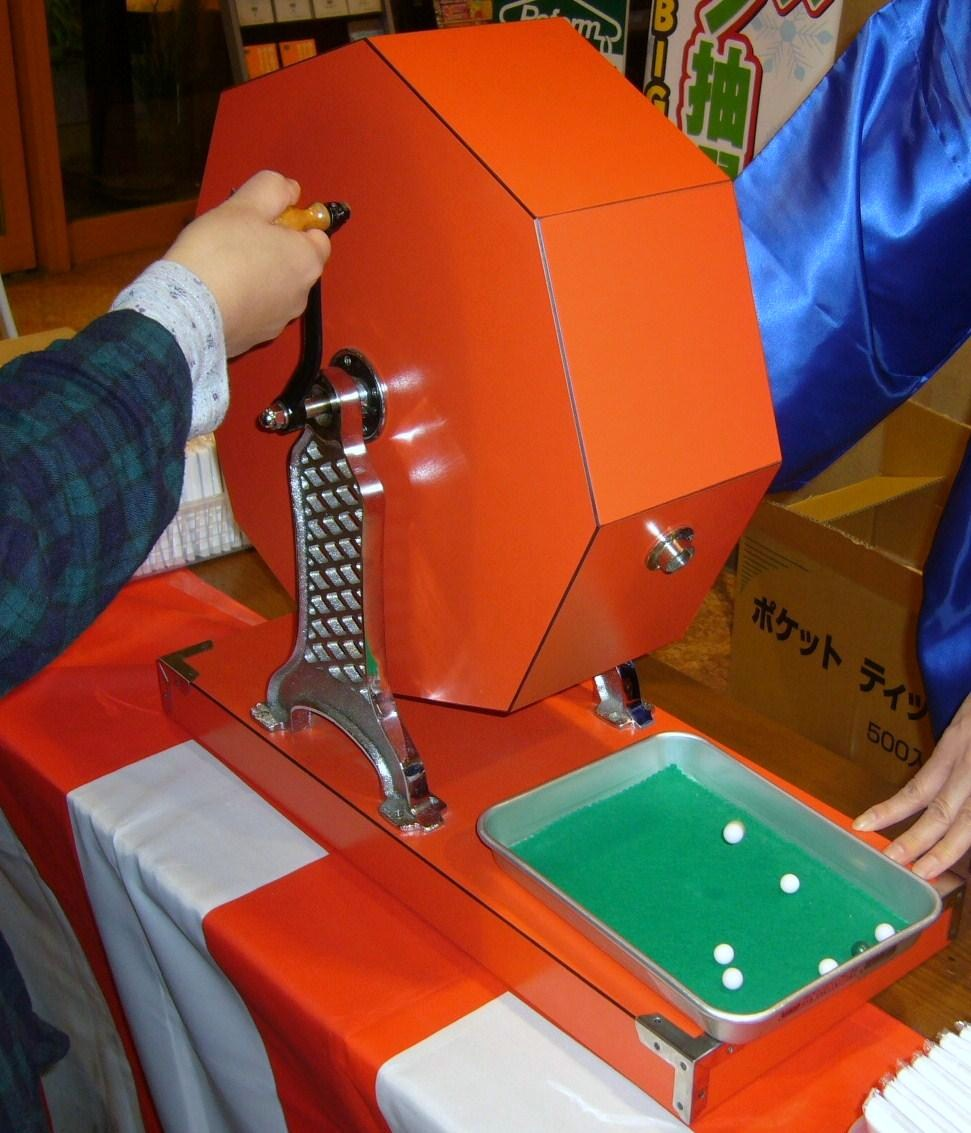
Japanese lottery machine

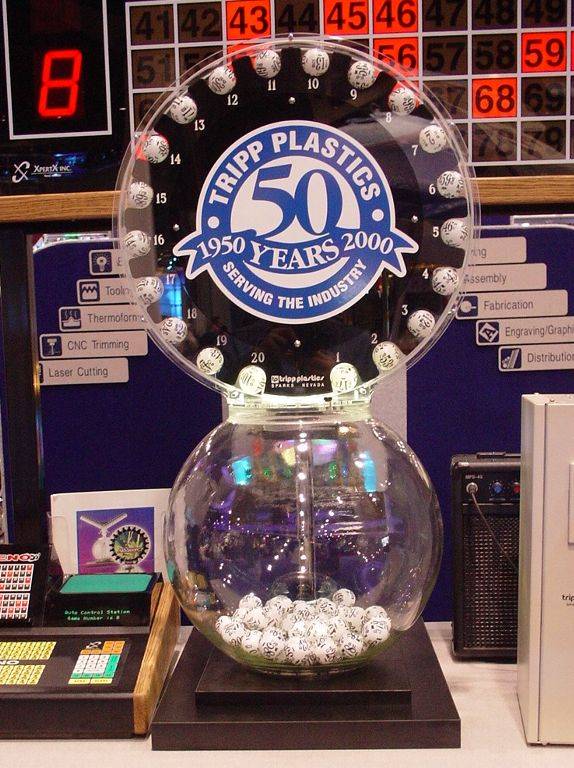
Lottery machine used in a casino to draw keno numbers

A lottery machine is the machine used to draw the winning numbers for a lottery.

Early lotteries were done by drawing numbers, or winning tickets, from a container. In the UK, numbers of winning Premium Bonds (which were not strictly a lottery, but very similar in approach) were generated by an electronic machine called ERNIE.

== Types ==
=== Mechanical machines ===
Most lotteries use mechanical lottery machines. These are more interesting to watch, and more transparent, both literally and figuratively: the audience can see exactly how the internal workings of the machine operate, and they can watch the balls come out of the machine; generally, the balls are visible during the entire draw.

==== Gravity Pick ====
A gravity pick machine has a chamber with rotating paddles inside, spinning in opposite directions. Numbered balls are dropped into the chamber and mixed until a sliding door opens, allowing the desired number of balls to pass through, one at a time. Machines of this type are used in many games, such as the American games Mega Millions, Powerball and Cash4Life, and the pan-European game EuroMillions.

A similar method is used to draw numbers from a manually operated bingo cage; a weighted cup catches the ball, which drops it onto the tray as the cage is rotated. This variant was at one time used by the Pennsylvania Lottery, the New Jersey Lottery, and the Illinois Lottery; in this variant, a cover is placed strategically, so as to obscure extra balls drawn beyond the number called for by the game matrix.

==== Air mix ====
Air mix machines have a fan in the bottom that blows the balls around. A valve to a tube opens, and the balls that are blown into the tube are the winning numbers. The balls are evenly weighted and are usually locked away in vaults when not in use, in order to prevent tampering. Machines of this type are used for many "daily numbers"-type games, as well as the pan-European game Eurojackpot.

Though similar in style to the latter type of "air mix" machines, those currently used by the American Powerball game do not use air mix; it is more in tune with a "gravity pick" machine, with the mixing paddles at the bottom of the machine. As the mixing paddle slows down, the ball lands on a pedestal, where it is carried to the top of the machine and then pushed onto the tray. On rare occasions, a similar machine is used in a "pick 3" or "pick 4" game.

=== Random number generator ===
Some lotteries use computerized random number generators, either alongside or in place of a mechanical draw machine. These are more "cost-effective": with mechanical equipment, machines and balls have to be replaced periodically. However, these are not as interesting to watch, and may give a player a sense that the lottery is being rigged.

== Security measures ==
Because of the massive payoff for a successful cheat (especially after the 1980 Pennsylvania Lottery scandal where drawing balls were rigged to draw a certain number of results), lottery machines are subject to strict security measures. In some cases there are several machines and several sets of balls, and the combination to be used is selected at random just before the draw. An independent accounting firm is hired by each lottery to watch the entire process and certify each drawing, and to step in and wave off the drawing if there are mechanical or technical issues during the drawing, or if the drawing is suspicious. Mechanical machines and RNG machines are also air-gapped from any type of network or external drive connection to prevent a hacking attack against the lottery to influence the results.
