= Taylor Swift singles discography =

Singles by American singer-songwriter

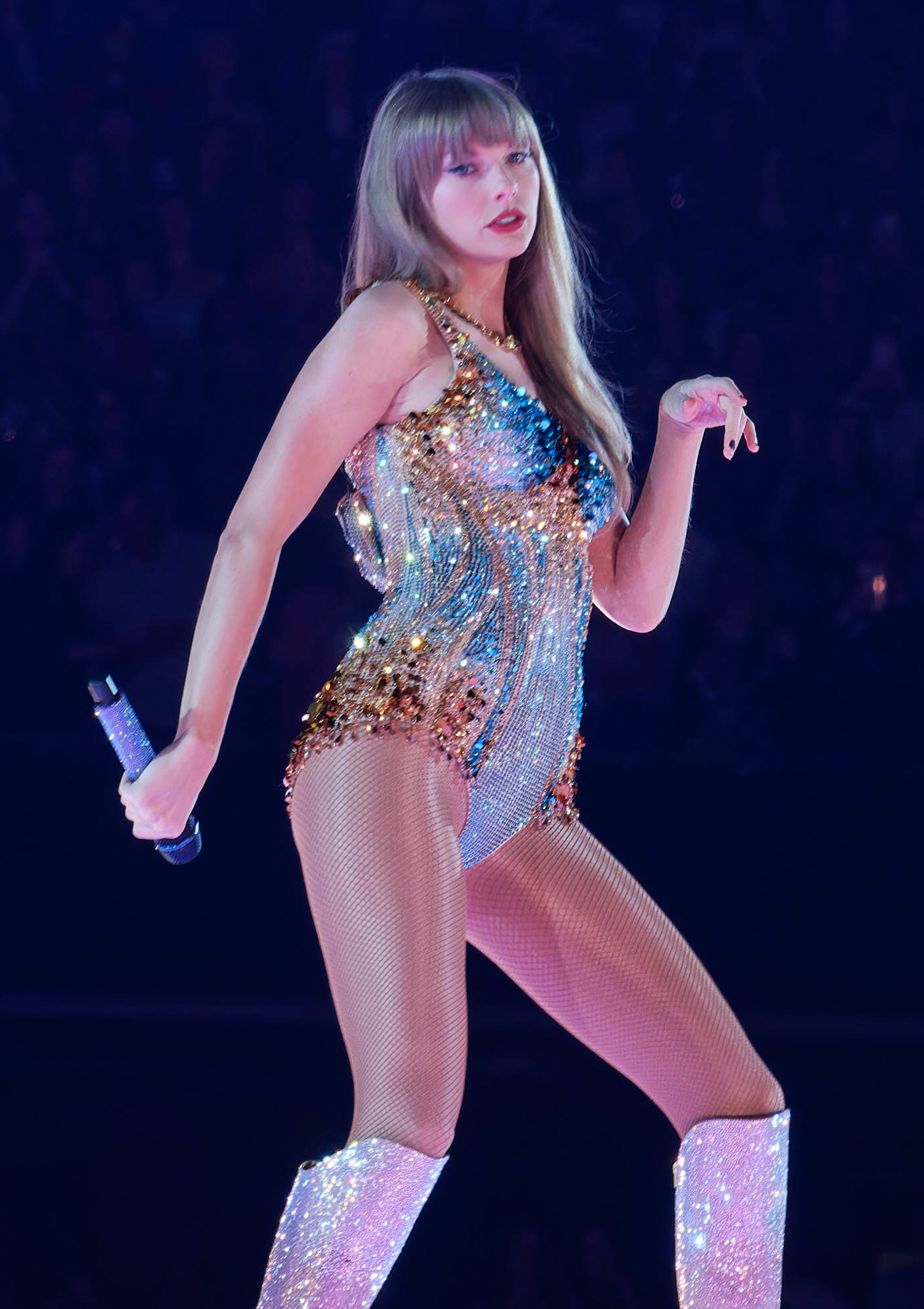
- Swift on the Eras Tour in 2023
- As lead artist: 68
- As featured artist: 9
- Promotional singles: 42

The American singer-songwriter Taylor Swift has released 68 singles as a lead artist, 9 singles as a featured artist, and 42 promotional singles. As of May 2025, Swift had achieved 137.5 million certified digital single units based on sales and on-demand streaming by the Recording Industry Association of America (RIAA). On the Billboard Hot 100, as of October 2026, she has garnered 16 number-one songs. She is the female musician with the most charted songs (281), most top-40 songs (182), most top-20 songs (117), most top-10 songs (74), most top-10 debuts (63), most top-five songs (46), and most top-five debuts (35). Additionally, she ties with Drake for the most number-one debuts (10).

Swift had her first Billboard Hot 100 chart entry with "Tim McGraw", the lead single from her first studio album, Taylor Swift (2006). Fearless (2008) spawned the international top-10 singles "Love Story" (Swift's first Australian number-one single) and "You Belong with Me", and Speak Now (2010) included the US top-10 singles "Mine" and "Back to December". Red (2012), 1989 (2014), and Reputation (2017) spawned successive number-one singles: "We Are Never Ever Getting Back Together" (her first Billboard Hot 100 number one), "Shake It Off", "Blank Space", "Bad Blood", and "Look What You Made Me Do" (her first number one in Ireland and the UK). The albums also contained the top-10 singles "I Knew You Were Trouble", "Style", "Wildest Dreams", and "...Ready for It?".

Lover (2019) was supported by the Billboard Hot 100 top-10 singles "Me!", "You Need to Calm Down", and "Lover" as well as the number-one single "Cruel Summer". With Folklore (2020) and its lead single "Cardigan", Swift became the first artist to debut atop both the Billboard 200 and Hot 100 in the same week; she achieved this feat six more times with "Willow" from Evermore (2020), "All Too Well (10 Minute Version)"—the longest song in duration to reach number one—from Red (Taylor's Version) (2021), "Anti-Hero" from Midnights (2022), "Is It Over Now?" from 1989 (Taylor's Version) (2023), "Fortnight" from The Tortured Poets Department (2024), and "The Fate of Ophelia" from The Life of a Showgirl (2025).

Swift is the first artist to monopolize the top 10 of the Billboard Hot 100 with Midnights and the top 14 with The Tortured Poets Department, which set the record for the most simultaneous new entries by a woman (31). With "Opalite" peaking atop the Billboard Hot 100, The Life of a Showgirl became Swift's second album after 1989 to have multiple number-one songs. Its reissue featured four additional top-10 Hot 100 songs, led by "Patient Zero" at number one, making The Life of a Showgirl the album with the most top-10 entries of all time (14 in total).

Besides material for her albums, Swift has recorded songs for film soundtracks including her first number-one Canadian single "Today Was a Fairytale" for Valentine's Day (2010), the Billboard Hot 100 top-30 entries "Safe & Sound" featuring the Civil Wars and "Eyes Open" for The Hunger Games (2012),, the international top-five single "I Don't Wanna Live Forever" with Zayn for Fifty Shades Darker (2017), and the Billboard Hot 100 number-one single "I Knew It, I Knew You" for Toy Story 5 (2026).

== As lead artist ==
=== 2000s ===
List of singles as lead artist, with selected chart positions and certifications, showing year released and originating albumList of 2000s singles
Title	Year	Peak chart positions										Certifications	Album
Title	Year	US	AUS	AUT	CAN	GER	IRE	JPN	NZ	SWI	UK	Certifications	Album
"Tim McGraw"	2006	40	—	—	—	—	—	—	—	—	—	RIAA: 2× Platinum; ARIA: Gold	Taylor Swift
"Teardrops on My Guitar"	2007	13	—	—	45	—	—	—	—	—	51	RIAA: 3× Platinum; ARIA: Platinum; BPI: Silver; MC: Platinum; RMNZ: Gold	Taylor Swift
"Our Song"	2007	16	—	—	30	—	—	—	—	—	—	RIAA: 4× Platinum; ARIA: 3× Platinum; BPI: Gold; MC: Platinum; RMNZ: Platinum	Taylor Swift
"Picture to Burn"	2008	28	—	—	48	—	—	—	—	—	—	RIAA: 2× Platinum; ARIA: Platinum; BPI: Silver; MC: Gold; RMNZ: Gold	Taylor Swift
"Should've Said No"	2008	33	—	—	67	—	—	—	18	—	—	RIAA: Platinum; ARIA: Gold; RMNZ: Gold	Taylor Swift
"Love Story"	2008	4	1	30	4	22	3	3	3	50	2	RIAA: 8× Platinum; ARIA: 15× Platinum; BPI: 4× Platinum; BVMI: Platinum; IFPI AUT: Platinum; MC: 2× Platinum; RIAJ: Gold; RMNZ: 4× Platinum	Fearless
"White Horse"	2008	13	41	—	43	—	—	—	—	—	60	RIAA: 2× Platinum; ARIA: Platinum; MC: Gold	Fearless
"You Belong with Me"	2009	2	5	—	3	—	12	10	5	58	30	RIAA: 7× Platinum; ARIA: 10× Platinum; BPI: 2× Platinum; BVMI: Gold; MC: 2× Platinum; RIAJ: Platinum; RMNZ: 3× Platinum	Fearless
"Fifteen"	2009	23	48	—	19	—	—	—	—	—	—	RIAA: 2× Platinum; ARIA: Platinum; MC: Gold; RMNZ: Gold	Fearless
"—" denotes a recording that did not chart in that territory.

=== 2010s ===
List of 2010s singles
Title	Year	Peak chart positions										Certifications	Album
Title	Year	US	AUS	AUT	CAN	GER	IRE	JPN	NZ	SWI	UK	Certifications	Album
"Fearless"	2010	9	—	—	69	—	—	—	—	—	111	RIAA: Platinum; ARIA: Platinum; RMNZ: Gold	Fearless
"Today Was a Fairytale"	2010	2	3	—	1	—	41	63	29	—	57	RIAA: Platinum; ARIA: 2× Platinum	Valentine's Day – Soundtrack
"Mine"	2010	3	9	—	7	57	38	6	16	46	30	RIAA: 3× Platinum; ARIA: 3× Platinum; BPI: Silver; MC: Platinum; RIAJ: Gold; RMNZ: Platinum	Speak Now
"Back to December"	2010	6	26	—	7	—	—	62	24	—	—	RIAA: 2× Platinum; ARIA: 2× Platinum; BPI: Silver; MC: Gold; RMNZ: Platinum	Speak Now
"Mean"	2011	11	45	—	10	—	—	—	—	—	—	RIAA: 3× Platinum; ARIA: 2× Platinum; BPI: Silver; MC: Gold; RMNZ: Platinum	Speak Now
"The Story of Us"	2011	41	—	—	70	—	—	—	—	—	—	RIAA: Platinum; ARIA: Platinum; BPI: Silver; RMNZ: Gold	Speak Now
"Sparks Fly"	2011	17	97	—	28	—	—	—	—	—	—	RIAA: Platinum; ARIA: Platinum; RMNZ: Gold	Speak Now
"Ours"	2011	13	91	—	68	—	—	—	—	—	181	RIAA: Platinum; ARIA: Gold	Speak Now
"Eyes Open"	2012	19	47	—	17	—	65	—	6	—	70	RIAA: Platinum; ARIA: Gold; RMNZ: Gold	The Hunger Games – Soundtrack
"We Are Never Ever Getting Back Together"	2012	1	3	22	1	21	4	2	1	21	4	RIAA: 6× Platinum; ARIA: 10× Platinum; BPI: 2× Platinum; BVMI: Platinum; IFPI AUT: Platinum; RIAJ: Million; MC: Gold; RMNZ: 3× Platinum	Red
"Ronan"	2012	16	—	—	—	—	—	—	—	—	—	RIAA: Gold	Non-album charity single
"Begin Again"	2012	7	20	—	4	—	25	—	11	—	30	RIAA: Platinum; ARIA: Platinum; MC: Gold; RMNZ: Gold	Red
"I Knew You Were Trouble"	2012	2	3	6	2	9	4	51	3	8	2	RIAA: 7× Platinum; ARIA: 11× Platinum; BPI: 3× Platinum; BVMI: Platinum; IFPI AUT: 2× Platinum; IFPI SWI: Platinum; MC: 5× Platinum; RIAJ: Gold; RMNZ: 4× Platinum	Red
"22"	2013	20	21	—	20	—	12	53	23	—	9	RIAA: 3× Platinum; ARIA: 4× Platinum; BPI: Platinum; MC: Platinum; RIAJ: Gold; RMNZ: Platinum	Red
"Highway Don't Care" (Tim McGraw with Taylor Swift featuring Keith Urban)	2013	22	73	—	21	—	—	—	—	—	—	RIAA: 3× Platinum; ARIA: Platinum; RMNZ: Gold	Two Lanes of Freedom
"Red"	2013	6	30	—	5	—	25	43	14	—	26	RIAA: 2× Platinum; ARIA: 2× Platinum; BPI: Silver; RMNZ: Platinum	Red
"Everything Has Changed" (featuring Ed Sheeran)	2013	32	28	—	28	—	5	—	22	—	7	RIAA: 2× Platinum; ARIA: 3× Platinum; BPI: Platinum; RMNZ: Platinum	Red
"The Last Time" (featuring Gary Lightbody)	2013	— (Note: "The Last Time" did not enter the Billboard Hot 100, but it peaked at number 3 on the Bubbling Under Hot 100 chart.)	—	—	73	—	15	—	—	—	25	ARIA: Gold	Red
"Shake It Off"	2014	1	1	6	1	5	3	4	1	7	2	RIAA: Diamond; ARIA: 19× Platinum; BPI: 6× Platinum; BVMI: 3× Gold; IFPI AUT: 2× Platinum; IFPI SWI: Platinum; MC: 6× Platinum; RIAJ: 3× Platinum; RMNZ: 7× Platinum	1989
"Blank Space"	2014	1	1	6	1	9	4	45	2	12	4	RIAA: 8× Platinum; ARIA: 15× Platinum; BPI: 4× Platinum; BVMI: Platinum; IFPI AUT: 2× Platinum; IFPI SWI: Gold; MC: 4× Platinum; RIAJ: Gold; RMNZ: 6× Platinum	1989
"Style"	2015	6	8	19	6	25	23	53	11	19	21	RIAA: 3× Platinum; ARIA: 10× Platinum; BPI: 3× Platinum; BVMI: Gold; IFPI AUT: Platinum; MC: 3× Platinum; RMNZ: 4× Platinum	1989
"Bad Blood" (solo or featuring Kendrick Lamar)	2015	1	1	22	1	29	8	20	1	28	4	RIAA: 6× Platinum; ARIA: 9× Platinum; BPI: 2× Platinum; BVMI: Gold; IFPI AUT: Platinum; MC: 3× Platinum; RMNZ: 3× Platinum	1989
"Wildest Dreams"	2015	5	3	21	4	51	39	—	8	53	40	RIAA: 4× Platinum; ARIA: 9× Platinum; BPI: 2× Platinum; BVMI: Gold; IFPI AUT: Platinum; MC: Platinum; RMNZ: 3× Platinum	1989
"Out of the Woods"	2016	18	19	64	8	—	—	—	6	—	136	RIAA: Platinum; ARIA: 3× Platinum; BPI: Gold; MC: Gold; RMNZ: Platinum	1989
"New Romantics"	2016	46	35	—	58	—	—	90	—	—	132	RIAA: Gold; ARIA: 2× Platinum; BPI: Silver; RMNZ: Platinum	1989
"I Don't Wanna Live Forever" (with Zayn)	2016	2	3	2	2	2	4	—	4	2	5	RIAA: 4× Platinum; ARIA: 10× Platinum; BPI: 2× Platinum; BVMI: 3× Gold; MC: 7× Platinum; RMNZ: 5× Platinum	Fifty Shades Darker – Soundtrack
"Look What You Made Me Do"	2017	1	1	2	1	3	1	7	1	6	1	RIAA: 4× Platinum; ARIA: 7× Platinum; BPI: 2× Platinum; BVMI: Gold; IFPI AUT: Platinum; MC: 3× Platinum; RMNZ: 3× Platinum	Reputation
"...Ready for It?"	2017	4	3	26	7	47	12	—	9	41	7	RIAA: 2× Platinum; ARIA: 6× Platinum; BPI: 2× Platinum; BVMI: Gold; MC: 2× Platinum; RMNZ: 2× Platinum	Reputation
"End Game" (featuring Ed Sheeran and Future)	2017	18	36	—	11	—	68	—	— (Note: "End Game" did not enter the NZ Top 40 Singles Chart, but it peaked at number 2 on the NZ Heatseeker Singles Chart.)	—	49	RIAA: Platinum; ARIA: 3× Platinum; BPI: Gold; MC: Platinum; RMNZ: Platinum	Reputation
"New Year's Day"	2017	—	—	—	—	—	—	—	—	—	—	ARIA: Platinum; BPI: Silver; RMNZ: Gold	Reputation
"Delicate"	2018	12	28	70	20	—	31	—	33	88	45	RIAA: 2× Platinum; ARIA: 6× Platinum; BPI: Platinum; RMNZ: 3× Platinum	Reputation
"Getaway Car"	2018	—	96	—	—	—	—	—	— (Note: "Getaway Car" did not enter the NZ Top 40 Singles Chart, but it peaked at number 9 on the NZ Hot Singles Chart.)	—	—	ARIA: 4× Platinum; BPI: Platinum; RMNZ: 2× Platinum	Reputation
"Me!" (featuring Brendon Urie of Panic! at the Disco)	2019	2	2	7	2	12	5	6	3	12	3	RIAA: 2× Platinum; ARIA: 5× Platinum; BPI: Platinum; BVMI: Gold; IFPI AUT: Platinum; MC: Platinum; RMNZ: 2× Platinum	Lover
"You Need to Calm Down"	2019	2	3	21	4	36	5	23	5	22	5	RIAA: 3× Platinum; ARIA: 7× Platinum; BPI: 2× Platinum; BVMI: Gold; IFPI AUT: Platinum; RMNZ: 3× Platinum	Lover
"Lover"	2019	10	3	47	7	61	9	76	3	52	14	RIAA: 2× Platinum; ARIA: 8× Platinum; BPI: 2× Platinum; IFPI AUT: Platinum; MC: 3× Platinum; RMNZ: 5× Platinum	Lover
"Christmas Tree Farm"	2019	59	49	50	40	60	51	—	— (Note: "Christmas Tree Farm" did not enter the NZ Top 40 Singles Chart, but it peaked at number 9 on the NZ Hot Singles Chart.)	50	44	ARIA: Gold; BPI: Gold; RMNZ: Gold	Non-album single
"—" denotes a recording that did not chart in that territory.

=== 2020s ===
List of 2020s singles
Title	Year	Peak chart positions										Certifications	Album
Title	Year	US	AUS	AUT	CAN	GER	IRE	NZ	SWI	UK	WW	Certifications	Album
"The Man"	2020	23	17	66	21	—	16	15	80	21	—	RIAA: Platinum; ARIA: 5× Platinum; BPI: Platinum; RMNZ: 2× Platinum	Lover
"Cardigan"	2020	1	1	46	3	67	4	2	51	6	77	RIAA: Platinum; ARIA: 6× Platinum; BPI: 2× Platinum; BVMI: Gold; MC: 2× Platinum; RMNZ: 4× Platinum	Folklore
"Exile" (featuring Bon Iver)	2020	6	3	56	6	—	3	5	48	8	133	RIAA: Platinum; ARIA: 4× Platinum; BPI: Platinum; MC: 2× Platinum; RMNZ: 2× Platinum	Folklore
"Betty"	2020	42	22	—	32	—	88	—	—	—	180	ARIA: Platinum; BPI: Gold; MC: Gold; RMNZ: Platinum	Folklore
"Willow"	2020	1	1	30	1	46	3	3	21	3	2	RIAA: Platinum; ARIA: 5× Platinum; BPI: Platinum; MC: Platinum; RMNZ: 2× Platinum	Evermore
"No Body, No Crime" (featuring Haim)	2021	34	16	—	11	—	11	29	—	19	16	ARIA: Platinum; BPI: Silver; RMNZ: Gold	Evermore
"Coney Island" (featuring the National)	2021	63	42	—	31	—	—	—	—	—	45	ARIA: Gold; BPI: Silver; RMNZ: Gold	Evermore
"I Bet You Think About Me" (Note: Subtitled "(Taylor's Version) (From the Vault)") (featuring Chris Stapleton)	2021	22	43	—	17	—	—	—	—	—	22	ARIA: Gold; BPI: Silver; RMNZ: Gold	Red (Taylor's Version)
"Message in a Bottle"	2021	45	33	—	32	—	—	— (Note: "Message in a Bottle" did not enter the NZ Top 40 Singles Chart, but it peaked at number 12 on the NZ Hot Singles Chart.)	—	—	50	ARIA: Platinum; BPI: Silver; RMNZ: Gold	Red (Taylor's Version)
"Anti-Hero"	2022	1	1	6	1	7	1	1	6	1	1	ARIA: 8× Platinum; BPI: 4× Platinum; BVMI: Platinum; IFPI AUT: 2× Platinum; IFPI SWI: Platinum; MC: 2× Platinum; RMNZ: 4× Platinum	Midnights
"Snow on the Beach" (featuring Lana Del Rey)	2022	4	3	12	3	74	3	4	16	4	3	ARIA: 2× Platinum; BPI: Platinum; MC: Platinum; RMNZ: Platinum	Midnights
"Lavender Haze"	2022	2	2	15	2	71	2	2	18	3	2	ARIA: 4× Platinum; BPI: Platinum; MC: Platinum; RMNZ: 2× Platinum	Midnights
"Karma" (solo or featuring Ice Spice)	2023	2	2	—	4	—	8	9	—	12	6	ARIA: 5× Platinum; BPI: Platinum; MC: Platinum; RMNZ: 2× Platinum	Midnights
"Cruel Summer"	2023	1	1	16	1	15	4	3	9	2	1	ARIA: 13× Platinum; BPI: 4× Platinum; BVMI: Platinum; IFPI AUT: Platinum; IFPI SWI: 3× Platinum; RMNZ: 7× Platinum	Lover
"'Slut!'"	2023	3	4	—	3	45	6	5	—	5	3	ARIA: Platinum; BPI: Silver; RMNZ: Gold	1989 (Taylor's Version)
"Is It Over Now?"	2023	1	1	18	1	51	2	1	37	1	1	ARIA: 2× Platinum; BPI: Platinum; RMNZ: Platinum	1989 (Taylor's Version)
"Fortnight" (featuring Post Malone)	2024	1	1	2	1	2	2	1	3	1	1	ARIA: 5× Platinum; BPI: 2× Platinum; BVMI: Gold; IFPI SWI: Platinum; MC: Gold; RMNZ: 2× Platinum	The Tortured Poets Department
"I Can Do It with a Broken Heart"	2024	3	5	11	4	60	5	6	30	8	5	ARIA: 3× Platinum; BPI: Platinum; RMNZ: Platinum	The Tortured Poets Department
"The Fate of Ophelia"	2025	1	1	1	1	1	1	1	1	1	1	ARIA: 2× Platinum; BPI: 2× Platinum; BVMI: Platinum; IFPI AUT: Platinum; MC: 3× Platinum; RMNZ: 3× Platinum	The Life of a Showgirl
"Opalite"	2026	1	2	2	2	1	2	2	2	1	2	ARIA: Platinum; BPI: Platinum; BVMI: Gold; IFPI AUT: Gold; MC: 2× Platinum; RMNZ: 2× Platinum	The Life of a Showgirl
"Elizabeth Taylor"	2026	3	3	3	3	4	3	3	3	3	3	ARIA: Platinum; BPI: Gold; MC: Platinum; RMNZ: Platinum	The Life of a Showgirl
"I Knew It, I Knew You"	2026	1	1	1	1	1	2	5	18	1	1	BPI: Gold; RMNZ: Gold	Toy Story 5 (Original Motion Picture Soundtrack)
"Patient Zero"	2026	1	1	1	1	1	1	1	1	1	1	BPI: Silver	The Life of a Showgirl: The Encore
"—" denotes a recording that did not chart in that territory.

== As featured artist ==
List of singles as featured artist, with selected chart positions and certifications, showing year released and originating albumList of singles as featured artist
Title	Year	Peak chart positions										Certifications	Album
Title	Year	US	AUS	AUT	CAN	GER	IRE	NZ	SWI	UK	WW	Certifications	Album
"God Bless the Children" (Wayne Warner and the Nashville All-Star Choir)	2006	—	—	—	—	—	—	—	—	—	—		Turbo Twang'n
"Two Is Better Than One" (Boys Like Girls featuring Taylor Swift)	2009	18	—	—	18	—	—	—	—	—	—	RIAA: Platinum	Love Drunk
"Half of My Heart" (John Mayer featuring Taylor Swift)	2010	25	71	—	53	—	—	—	—	—	—	RIAA: Platinum; ARIA: Gold; RMNZ: Gold	Battle Studies
"Both of Us" (B.o.B featuring Taylor Swift)	2012	18	5	—	23	—	26	10	—	22	—	RIAA: Platinum; ARIA: Platinum; RMNZ: Platinum	Strange Clouds
"Babe" (Sugarland featuring Taylor Swift)	2018	72	—	—	94	—	—	— (Note: "Babe" did not enter the NZ Top 40 Singles Chart, but it peaked at number 10 on the NZ Heatseeker Singles Chart.)	—	—	—	RIAA: Gold	Bigger
"Gasoline" (Haim featuring Taylor Swift)	2021	—	—	—	—	—	—	— (Note: "Gasoline" did not enter the NZ Top 40 Singles Chart, but it peaked at number 23 on the NZ Hot Singles Chart.)	—	—	—		Women in Music Pt. III (Expanded Edition)
"Renegade" (Big Red Machine featuring Taylor Swift)	2021	73	70	—	58	—	53	— (Note: "Renegade" did not enter the NZ Top 40 Singles Chart, but it peaked at number 3 on the NZ Hot Singles Chart.)	—	73	96	RIAA: Gold; RMNZ: Gold	How Long Do You Think It's Gonna Last?
"The Joker and the Queen" (Ed Sheeran featuring Taylor Swift)	2022	21	—	35	12	37	—	26	19	—	10	IFPI AUT: Gold; MC: Platinum	=
"The Alcott" (The National featuring Taylor Swift)	2023	—	—	—	—	—	63	— (Note: "The Alcott" did not enter the NZ Top 40 Singles Chart, but it peaked at number five on the NZ Hot Singles Chart.)	—	90	—		First Two Pages of Frankenstein
"—" denotes a recording that did not chart in that territory.

== Promotional singles ==
List of promotional singles, with selected chart positions and certifications, showing year released and originating albumList of promotional singles
Title	Year	Peak chart positions										Certifications	Album
Title	Year	US	AUS	AUT	CAN	IRE	JPN	NZ	SWI	UK	WW	Certifications	Album
"I Heart ?"	2008	—	—	—	—	—	—	—	—	—	—		Beautiful Eyes
"Beautiful Eyes"	2008	—	—	—	—	—	—	—	—	—	—		Beautiful Eyes
"Change"	2008	10	—	—	—	—	—	—	—	—	—	RIAA: Gold	AT&T Team USA Soundtrack and Fearless (Note: "Change" was later included on her album Fearless.)
"Breathe" (featuring Colbie Caillat)	2008	87	—	—	—	—	—	—	—	—	—	RIAA: Gold; ARIA: Gold	Fearless
"You're Not Sorry"	2008	11	—	—	11	—	—	—	—	—	—	RIAA: Platinum	Fearless
"American Girl"	2009	— (Note: "American Girl" did not enter the Billboard Hot 100, but it peaked at number 15 on the Bubbling Under Hot 100 chart.)	—	—	—	—	—	—	—	—	—		Non-album promotional single
"Speak Now"	2010	8	20	—	8	—	—	34	—	—	—	RIAA: Gold; ARIA: Platinum	Speak Now
"Haunted" (acoustic)	2011	—	—	—	—	—	—	—	—	—	—	ARIA: Gold (Note: "Haunted" was certified for both the original version and the acoustic version that was released as an iTunes download)	Speak Now
"If This Was a Movie"	2011	10	—	—	17	—	—	—	—	191	—		Speak Now
"Superman"	2011	26	—	—	82	—	—	—	—	—	—		Speak Now
"Safe & Sound" (featuring the Civil Wars)	2011	30	38	—	31	—	—	11	—	67	—	RIAA: 2× Platinum; ARIA: 2× Platinum; BPI: Silver; RMNZ: Platinum	The Hunger Games – Soundtrack
"Long Live" (featuring Paula Fernandes)	2012	—	—	—	—	—	—	—	—	—	—		Speak Now World Tour – Live
"State of Grace"	2012	13	44	—	9	—	43	20	—	36	—	RIAA: Gold; ARIA: Gold	Red
"The Moment I Knew"	2013	64	—	—	58	—	—	—	—	197	—		Red
"Come Back... Be Here"	2013	—	—	—	64	—	—	—	—	188	—		Red
"Girl at Home"	2013	—	—	—	75	—	—	—	—	—	—		Red
"Sweeter than Fiction"	2013	34	44	—	17	—	38	26	—	45	—		One Chance – Soundtrack
"Welcome to New York"	2014	48	23	—	19	55	80	6	—	39	—	RIAA: Platinum; ARIA: 2× Platinum; BPI: Gold; RMNZ: Platinum	1989
"Wonderland"	2015	51	84	—	59	—	—	—	—	171	—	ARIA: Platinum; BPI: Silver; RMNZ: Gold	1989
"You Are in Love"	2015	83	—	—	99	—	—	—	—	—	—	ARIA: Gold; RMNZ: Gold	1989
"Gorgeous"	2017	13	9	32	9	18	52	19	46	15	—	RIAA: Gold; ARIA: 3× Platinum; BPI: Platinum; RMNZ: Platinum	Reputation
"Call It What You Want"	2017	27	16	43	24	44	—	34	99	29	—	RIAA: Gold; ARIA: Platinum; BPI: Gold; RMNZ: Platinum	Reputation
"The Archer"	2019	38	19	—	41	31	—	28	—	43	—	ARIA: 2× Platinum; BPI: Gold; RMNZ: Platinum	Lover
"Beautiful Ghosts"	2019	—	—	—	—	—	—	— (Note: "Beautiful Ghosts" did not enter the NZ Top 40 Singles Chart, but it peaked at number 36 on the NZ Hot Singles Chart.)	—	—	—		Cats – Soundtrack
"Only the Young"	2020	50	31	—	57	40	—	— (Note: "Only the Young" did not enter the NZ Top 40 Singles Chart, but it peaked at number 2 on the NZ Hot Singles Chart.)	—	57	—	ARIA: Gold	Non-album promotional single
"The 1"	2020	4	4	—	7	7	—	7	92	10	114	RIAA: Platinum; ARIA: 3× Platinum; BPI: Platinum; RMNZ: Platinum	Folklore
"Love Story (Taylor's Version)"	2021	11	21	—	7	7	—	18	—	12	7	ARIA: 4× Platinum; BPI: Platinum; RMNZ: 2× Platinum	Fearless (Taylor's Version)
"You All Over Me" (featuring Maren Morris)	2021	51	34	—	29	35	—	— (Note: "You All Over Me" did not enter the NZ Top 40 Singles Chart, but it peaked at number 3 on the NZ Hot Singles Chart.)	—	52	35		Fearless (Taylor's Version)
"Mr. Perfectly Fine"	2021	30	19	—	23	15	—	25	—	30	19	ARIA: 2× Platinum; BPI: Silver; RMNZ: Platinum	Fearless (Taylor's Version)
"The Lakes"	2021	— (Note: "The Lakes" did not enter the Billboard Hot 100, but it peaked at number 18 on the Bubbling Under Hot 100 chart.)	—	—	—	52	—	— (Note: "The Lakes" did not enter the NZ Top 40 Singles Chart, but it peaked at number 13 on the NZ Hot Singles Chart.)	—	88	—	ARIA: Platinum; BPI: Silver; RMNZ: Gold	Folklore
"Wildest Dreams (Taylor's Version)"	2021	19	14	—	18	15	—	30	—	25	19	ARIA: 2× Platinum; BPI: Platinum; MC: 2× Platinum; RMNZ: 2× Platinum	1989 (Taylor's Version)
"All Too Well (10 Minute Version)" (Note: Combined chart statistics with "All Too Well (Taylor's Version)")	2021	1	1	—	1	1	—	1	—	3	1	ARIA: 4× Platinum; BPI: 2× Platinum; RMNZ: 3× Platinum	Red (Taylor's Version)
"Christmas Tree Farm (Old Timey Version)"	2021	62	—	—	—	—	—	—	—	—	98		Non-album promotional single
"This Love (Taylor's Version)"	2022	42	23	—	30	26	—	40	—	42	35	ARIA: Platinum; BPI: Silver; RMNZ: Gold	1989 (Taylor's Version)
"Carolina"	2022	60	62	—	49	42	—	— (Note: "Carolina" did not enter the NZ Top 40 Singles Chart, but it peaked at number five on the NZ Hot Singles Chart.)	—	63	45		Where the Crawdads Sing – Soundtrack
"Bejeweled"	2022	6	7	—	7	—	—	9	—	63	8	ARIA: 3× Platinum; BPI: Platinum; MC: Platinum; RMNZ: Platinum	Midnights
"Question...?"	2022	7	11	—	10	—	—	—	—	—	11	ARIA: Platinum; BPI: Silver; MC: Gold; RMNZ: Gold	Midnights
"All of the Girls You Loved Before"	2023	12	15	—	12	9	—	13	—	11	10	ARIA: Platinum; BPI: Silver; RMNZ: Gold	The More Lover Chapter
"If This Was a Movie (Taylor's Version)"	2023	— (Note: "If This Was a Movie (Taylor's Version)" did not enter the Billboard Hot 100, but it peaked at number two on the Bubbling Under Hot 100 chart.)	—	—	—	—	—	— (Note: "If This Was a Movie (Taylor's Version)" did not enter the NZ Top 40 Singles Chart, but it peaked at number 12 on the NZ Hot Singles Chart.)	—	— (Note: "If This Was a Movie (Taylor's Version)" did not enter the UK Singles Chart but peaked at number 13 on the UK Single Downloads Chart.)	—		The More Fearless (Taylor's Version) Chapter
"Eyes Open (Taylor's Version)"	2023	— (Note: "Eyes Open (Taylor's Version)" did not enter the Billboard Hot 100, but it peaked at number nine on the Bubbling Under Hot 100 chart.)	—	—	—	—	—	— (Note: "Eyes Open (Taylor's Version)" did not enter the NZ Top 40 Singles Chart, but it peaked at number 15 on the NZ Hot Singles Chart.)	—	— (Note: "Eyes Open (Taylor's Version)" did not enter the UK Singles Chart but peaked at number 18 on the UK Single Downloads Chart.)	—		The More Red (Taylor's Version) Chapter
"Safe & Sound (Taylor's Version)" (featuring Joy Williams and John Paul White)	2023	— (Note: "Safe & Sound (Taylor's Version)" did not enter the Billboard Hot 100, but it peaked at number four on the Bubbling Under Hot 100 chart.)	—	—	—	—	—	— (Note: "Safe & Sound (Taylor's Version)" did not enter the NZ Top 40 Singles Chart, but it peaked at number 14 on the NZ Hot Singles Chart.)	—	— (Note: "Eyes Open (Taylor's Version)" did not enter the UK Singles Chart but peaked at number 16 on the UK Single Downloads Chart.)	—		The More Red (Taylor's Version) Chapter
"You're Losing Me" (Note: Subtitled "(From the Vault)")	2023	27	13	—	18	14	—	15	82	20	15	ARIA: Platinum; BPI: Silver; RMNZ: Gold	Midnights
"—" denotes a recording that did not chart in that territory.

== Other charted or certified songs ==
=== 2000s ===
List of songs, with selected chart positions and certifications, showing year released and originating album
Title	Year	Peak chart positions						Certifications	Album
Title	Year	US	US Country	US Pop (Note: The Pop 100 chart was discontinued in 2009.)	AUS	CAN	UK	Certifications	Album
"I'm Only Me When I'm with You"	2007	— (Note: "I'm Only Me When I'm with You" did not enter the Billboard Hot 100, but it peaked at number 15 on the Bubbling Under Hot 100 chart.)	—	80	—	—	—	RIAA: Platinum	Taylor Swift
"Invisible"	2007	— (Note: "Invisible" did not enter the Billboard Hot 100, but it peaked at number 3 on the Bubbling Under Hot 100 chart.)	—	—	—	—	—	RIAA: Gold	Taylor Swift
"Last Christmas"	2007	—	28	—	—	—	—		The Taylor Swift Holiday Collection
"Santa Baby"	2007	—	43	—	—	—	—		The Taylor Swift Holiday Collection
"White Christmas"	2007	—	59	—	—	—	—		The Taylor Swift Holiday Collection
"Silent Night"	2007	—	54	—	—	—	—		The Taylor Swift Holiday Collection
"Christmases When You Were Mine"	2007	—	48	—	—	—	—		The Taylor Swift Holiday Collection
"Umbrella"	2008	— (Note: "Umbrella" did not enter the Billboard Hot 100, but it peaked at number 4 on the Bubbling Under Hot 100 chart.)	—	79	—	—	—		iTunes Live from SoHo
"Hey Stephen"	2008	94	—	—	—	—	—	RIAA: Gold	Fearless
"Tell Me Why"	2008	— (Note: "Tell Me Why" did not enter the Billboard Hot 100, but it peaked at number 1 on the Bubbling Under Hot 100 chart.)	—	—	—	—	—		Fearless
"The Way I Loved You"	2008	72	—	—	—	—	—	RIAA: Gold	Fearless
"Forever & Always"	2008	34	—	—	—	37	—	RIAA: Platinum; ARIA: Gold	Fearless
"The Best Day"	2008	— (Note: "The Best Day" did not enter the Billboard Hot 100, but it peaked at number 3 on the Bubbling Under Hot 100 chart.)	56	—	—	—	—	RIAA: Gold	Fearless
"Crazier"	2009	17	—	11	57	67	100	RIAA: Platinum; ARIA: Platinum; RMNZ: Gold	Hannah Montana: The Movie – Soundtrack
"Jump then Fall"	2009	10	59	—	98	14	—	RIAA: Gold	Fearless
"Untouchable"	2009	19	—	—	—	23	—		Fearless
"Come in with the Rain"	2009	30	—	—	—	40	—		Fearless
"SuperStar"	2009	26	—	—	—	35	—		Fearless
"The Other Side of the Door"	2009	23	—	—	—	30	—		Fearless
"—" denotes a recording that did not chart in that territory.

=== 2010s ===
Title	Year	Peak chart positions										Certifications	Album
Title	Year	US	AUS	AUT	CAN	GER	IRE	NZ	SWI	UK	WW	Certifications	Album
"Breathless"	2010	72	—	—	49	—	—	—	—	116	—		Hope for Haiti Now
"Dear John"	2010	54	—	—	68	—	—	—	—	—	—	ARIA: Gold	Speak Now
"Never Grow Up"	2010	84	—	—	—	—	—	—	—	—	—	RIAA: Gold; ARIA: Platinum	Speak Now
"Enchanted"	2010	75	27	—	47	—	—	—	—	—	55	RIAA: Gold; ARIA: 2× Platinum; BPI: Platinum; RMNZ: Platinum	Speak Now
"Better than Revenge"	2010	56	—	—	73	—	—	—	—	—	—	RIAA: Gold; ARIA: Platinum; BPI: Silver; RMNZ: Gold	Speak Now
"Innocent"	2010	27	—	—	53	—	—	—	—	—	—		Speak Now
"Haunted"	2010	63	—	—	61	—	—	—	—	—	—	RIAA: Gold; ARIA: Gold (Note: "Haunted" was certified for both the original version and the acoustic version that was released as an iTunes download)	Speak Now
"Last Kiss"	2010	71	—	—	99	—	—	—	—	—	—	ARIA: Gold	Speak Now
"Long Live"	2010	85	—	—	—	—	—	—	—	—	—	ARIA: Gold	Speak Now
"Drops of Jupiter" (live)	2011	— (Note: "Drops of Jupiter" (live) did not enter the Billboard Hot 100, but it peaked at number 7 on the Bubbling Under Hot 100 chart.)	—	—	—	—	—	—	—	—	—		Speak Now World Tour – Live
"Treacherous"	2012	— (Note: "Treacherous" did not enter the Billboard Hot 100, but it peaked at number 2 on the Bubbling Under Hot 100 chart.)	—	—	65	—	—	—	—	—	—		Red
"All Too Well"	2012	80	—	16	59	36	—	—	19	—	—	RIAA: Gold; ARIA: Platinum; BPI: Silver; RMNZ: Gold	Red
"I Almost Do"	2012	65	—	—	50	—	—	—	—	—	—		Red
"Stay Stay Stay"	2012	91	—	—	70	—	—	—	—	—	—		Red
"Holy Ground"	2012	— (Note: "Holy Ground" did not enter the Billboard Hot 100, but it peaked at number 12 on the Bubbling Under Hot 100 chart.)	—	—	89	—	—	—	—	—	—		Red
"Sad Beautiful Tragic"	2012	— (Note: "Sad Beautiful Tragic" did not enter the Billboard Hot 100, but it peaked at number 18 on the Bubbling Under Hot 100 chart.)	—	—	92	—	—	—	—	—	—		Red
"The Lucky One"	2012	— (Note: "The Lucky One" did not enter the Billboard Hot 100, but it peaked at number 13 on the Bubbling Under Hot 100 chart.)	—	—	88	—	—	—	—	—	—		Red
"Starlight"	2012	— (Note: "Starlight" did not enter the Billboard Hot 100, but it peaked at number 5 on the Bubbling Under Hot 100 chart.)	—	—	80	—	—	—	—	—	—		Red
"All You Had to Do Was Stay"	2014	— (Note: "All You Had to Do Was Stay" did not enter the Billboard Hot 100, but it peaked at number 14 on the Bubbling Under Hot 100 chart.)	99	—	92	—	—	—	—	—	—	RIAA: Gold; ARIA: Platinum; BPI: Silver; RMNZ: Gold	1989
"I Wish You Would"	2014	—	—	—	—	—	—	—	—	—	—	ARIA: Platinum; BPI: Silver; RMNZ: Gold	1989
"How You Get the Girl"	2014	— (Note: "How You Get the Girl" did not enter the Billboard Hot 100, but it peaked at number 4 on the Bubbling Under Hot 100 chart.)	—	—	81	—	—	—	—	—	—	RIAA: Gold; ARIA: Platinum; BPI: Silver; RMNZ: Gold	1989
"This Love"	2014	— (Note: "This Love" did not enter the Billboard Hot 100, but it peaked at number 19 on the Bubbling Under Hot 100 chart.)	—	—	84	—	—	—	—	—	—	RIAA: Platinum; ARIA: Gold	1989
"I Know Places"	2014	—	—	—	—	—	—	—	—	—	—	RIAA: Gold; ARIA: Gold; BPI: Silver	1989
"Clean"	2014	—	—	—	—	—	—	—	—	—	—	ARIA: Platinum; BPI: Silver; RMNZ: Gold	1989
"I Did Something Bad"	2017	— (Note: "I Did Something Bad" did not enter the Billboard Hot 100, but it peaked at number 14 on the Bubbling Under Hot 100 chart.)	—	—	—	—	—	— (Note: "I Did Something Bad" did not enter the NZ Top 40 Singles Chart, but it peaked at number 5 on the NZ Heatseeker Singles Chart.)	—	—	—	ARIA: 2× Platinum; BPI: Gold; RMNZ: Platinum	Reputation
"Don't Blame Me"	2017	—	16	49	—	99	55	—	88	77	107	ARIA: 5× Platinum; BPI: 2× Platinum; BVMI: Gold; IFPI AUT: Platinum; RMNZ: 3× Platinum	Reputation
"So It Goes..."	2017	—	—	—	—	—	—	—	—	—	—	ARIA: Platinum; BPI: Silver; RMNZ: Gold	Reputation
"King of My Heart"	2017	—	—	—	—	—	—	—	—	—	—	ARIA: Platinum; BPI: Silver; RMNZ: Gold	Reputation
"Dancing with Our Hands Tied"	2017	—	—	—	—	—	—	—	—	—	—	ARIA: Platinum; BPI: Silver; RMNZ: Gold	Reputation
"Dress"	2017	—	—	—	—	—	—	—	—	—	130	ARIA: Platinum; BPI: Gold; RMNZ: Platinum	Reputation
"This Is Why We Can't Have Nice Things"	2017	—	—	—	—	—	—	—	—	—	—	ARIA: Platinum; BPI: Silver; RMNZ: Gold	Reputation
"I Forgot That You Existed"	2019	28	24	—	29	—	—	— (Note: "I Forgot That You Existed" did not enter the NZ Top 40 Singles Chart, but it peaked at number 3 on the NZ Hot Singles Chart.)	—	—	—	ARIA: Platinum; BPI: Silver; RMNZ: Platinum	Lover
"I Think He Knows"	2019	51	34	—	48	—	—	—	—	—	—	ARIA: Platinum; BPI: Silver; RMNZ: Gold	Lover
"Miss Americana & the Heartbreak Prince"	2019	49	32	—	47	—	—	—	—	—	—	ARIA: 2× Platinum; BPI: Gold; RMNZ: Platinum	Lover
"Paper Rings"	2019	45	29	—	40	—	—	— (Note: "Paper Rings" did not enter the NZ Top 40 Singles Chart, but it peaked at number 4 on the NZ Hot Singles Chart.)	—	—	—	ARIA: 2× Platinum; BPI: Platinum; RMNZ: Platinum	Lover
"Cornelia Street"	2019	57	40	—	51	—	—	—	—	—	—	ARIA: Platinum; BPI: Silver; RMNZ: Platinum	Lover
"Death by a Thousand Cuts"	2019	67	48	—	64	—	—	—	—	—	—	ARIA: Platinum; BPI: Silver; RMNZ: Gold	Lover
"London Boy"	2019	62	42	—	54	—	—	—	—	—	—	ARIA: Platinum; BPI: Gold; RMNZ: Gold	Lover
"Soon You'll Get Better" (featuring the Dixie Chicks)	2019	63	54	—	71	—	—	—	—	—	—	ARIA: Gold; RMNZ: Gold	Lover
"False God"	2019	77	59	—	77	—	—	—	—	—	—	ARIA: Platinum; BPI: Silver; RMNZ: Gold	Lover
"Afterglow"	2019	75	57	—	72	—	—	—	—	—	—	ARIA: Platinum; BPI: Silver; RMNZ: Gold	Lover
"It's Nice to Have a Friend"	2019	92	72	—	97	—	—	—	—	—	—	ARIA: Gold	Lover
"Daylight"	2019	89	70	—	87	—	—	—	—	—	—	ARIA: Platinum; BPI: Silver; RMNZ: Platinum	Lover
"—" denotes a recording that did not chart in that territory.

=== 2020s ===
Title	Year	Peak chart positions										Certifications	Album
Title	Year	US	AUS	AUT	CAN	GER	IRE	NZ	SWI	UK	WW	Certifications	Album
"The Last Great American Dynasty"	2020	13	7	—	13	—	—	13	—	—	—	ARIA: 2× Platinum; BPI: Gold; RMNZ: Platinum	Folklore
"My Tears Ricochet"	2020	16	8	—	14	—	—	—	—	—	—	ARIA: 3× Platinum; BPI: Platinum; RMNZ: 2× Platinum	Folklore
"Mirrorball"	2020	26	14	—	22	—	—	—	—	—	—	ARIA: 2× Platinum; BPI: Gold; RMNZ: Platinum	Folklore
"Seven"	2020	35	16	—	26	—	—	—	—	—	—	ARIA: Platinum; BPI: Gold; RMNZ: Platinum	Folklore
"August"	2020	23	13	—	19	—	38	—	—	78	46	ARIA: 4× Platinum; BPI: 2× Platinum; RMNZ: 3× Platinum	Folklore
"This Is Me Trying"	2020	39	18	—	30	—	—	—	—	—	—	ARIA: Platinum; BPI: Gold; RMNZ: Platinum	Folklore
"Illicit Affairs"	2020	44	21	—	33	—	—	—	—	—	—	ARIA: 2× Platinum; BPI: Gold; RMNZ: Platinum	Folklore
"Invisible String"	2020	37	19	—	29	—	—	—	—	—	—	ARIA: Platinum; BPI: Gold; RMNZ: Platinum	Folklore
"Mad Woman"	2020	47	25	—	38	—	—	—	—	—	—	ARIA: Platinum; BPI: Silver; RMNZ: Gold	Folklore
"Epiphany"	2020	57	29	—	44	—	—	—	—	—	—	ARIA: Platinum; BPI: Silver; RMNZ: Gold	Folklore
"Peace"	2020	58	33	—	46	—	—	—	—	—	—	ARIA: Gold; BPI: Silver; RMNZ: Gold	Folklore
"Hoax"	2020	71	43	—	51	—	—	—	—	—	—	ARIA: Platinum; BPI: Silver; RMNZ: Gold	Folklore
"Champagne Problems"	2020	21	12	—	6	—	6	24	92	15	12	ARIA: 2× Platinum; BPI: Platinum; MC: Gold; RMNZ: Platinum	Evermore
"Gold Rush"	2020	40	21	—	14	—	—	34	—	—	21	ARIA: Platinum; BPI: Silver; RMNZ: Gold	Evermore
"'Tis the Damn Season"	2020	39	24	—	13	—	—	—	—	—	23	ARIA: Platinum; BPI: Silver; RMNZ: Gold	Evermore
"Tolerate It"	2020	45	33	—	18	—	—	—	—	—	28	ARIA: Platinum; BPI: Silver; RMNZ: Gold	Evermore
"Happiness"	2020	52	37	—	24	—	—	—	—	—	33	ARIA: Gold; BPI: Silver; RMNZ: Gold	Evermore
"Dorothea"	2020	67	47	—	34	—	—	—	—	—	47	ARIA: Gold; BPI: Silver; RMNZ: Gold	Evermore
"Ivy"	2020	61	43	—	28	—	—	—	—	—	43	ARIA: Gold; BPI: Silver; RMNZ: Gold	Evermore
"Cowboy like Me"	2020	71	55	—	43	—	—	—	—	—	62	ARIA: Gold; BPI: Silver; RMNZ: Gold	Evermore
"Long Story Short"	2020	68	49	—	39	—	—	—	—	—	55	ARIA: Gold; BPI: Silver; RMNZ: Gold	Evermore
"Marjorie"	2020	75	57	—	48	—	—	—	—	—	66	ARIA: Platinum; BPI: Silver; RMNZ: Gold	Evermore
"Closure"	2020	82	—	—	57	—	—	—	—	—	75	ARIA: Gold	Evermore
"Evermore" (featuring Bon Iver)	2020	57	45	—	26	—	—	—	—	—	40	ARIA: Platinum; BPI: Silver; RMNZ: Gold	Evermore
"Right Where You Left Me"	2021	— (Note: "Right Where You Left Me" did not enter the Billboard Hot 100, but it peaked at number 12 on the Bubbling Under Hot 100 chart.)	—	—	—	—	—	— (Note: "Right Where You Left Me" did not enter the NZ Top 40 Singles Chart, but it peaked at number 15 on the NZ Hot Singles Chart.)	—	—	—	ARIA: Platinum; BPI: Gold; RMNZ: Platinum	Evermore
"It's Time to Go"	2021	— (Note: "It's Time to Go" did not enter the Billboard Hot 100, but it peaked at number 4 on the Bubbling Under Hot 100 chart.)	—	—	86	—	—	— (Note: "It's Time to Go" did not enter the NZ Top 40 Singles Chart, but it peaked at number 13 on the NZ Hot Singles Chart.)	—	—	174	ARIA: Gold	Evermore
"Fearless (Taylor's Version)"	2021	71	54	—	46	—	—	— (Note: "Fearless (Taylor's Version)" did not enter the NZ Top 40 Singles Chart, but it peaked at number 4 on the NZ Hot Singles Chart.)	—	—	53	ARIA: Platinum; BPI: Silver; RMNZ: Gold	Fearless (Taylor's Version)
"Fifteen (Taylor's Version)"	2021	88	72	—	56	—	—	— (Note: "Fifteen (Taylor's Version)" did not enter the NZ Top 40 Singles Chart, but it peaked at number 7 on the NZ Hot Singles Chart.)	—	—	84		Fearless (Taylor's Version)
"Hey Stephen (Taylor's Version)"	2021	— (Note: "Hey Stephen (Taylor's Version)" did not enter the Billboard Hot 100, but it peaked at number 1 on the Bubbling Under Hot 100 chart.)	86	—	68	—	—	—	—	—	105		Fearless (Taylor's Version)
"White Horse (Taylor's Version)"	2021	— (Note: "White Horse (Taylor's Version)" did not enter the Billboard Hot 100, but it peaked at number 2 on the Bubbling Under Hot 100 chart.)	99	—	72	—	—	—	—	—	111	ARIA: Gold	Fearless (Taylor's Version)
"You Belong with Me (Taylor's Version)"	2021	75	37	—	44	—	30	— (Note: "You Belong with Me (Taylor's Version)" did not enter the NZ Top 40 Singles Chart, but it peaked at number 5 on the NZ Hot Singles Chart.)	—	52	51	ARIA: 3× Platinum; BPI: Platinum; RMNZ: Platinum	Fearless (Taylor's Version)
"Breathe (Taylor's Version)" (featuring Colbie Caillat)	2021	— (Note: "Breathe (Taylor's Version)" did not enter the Billboard Hot 100, but it peaked at number 8 on the Bubbling Under Hot 100 chart.)	—	—	78	—	—	—	—	—	133		Fearless (Taylor's Version)
"Tell Me Why (Taylor's Version)"	2021	— (Note: "Tell Me Why (Taylor's Version)" did not enter the Billboard Hot 100, but it peaked at number 13 on the Bubbling Under Hot 100 chart.)	—	—	92	—	—	—	—	—	171		Fearless (Taylor's Version)
"You're Not Sorry (Taylor's Version)"	2021	— (Note: "You're Not Sorry (Taylor's Version)" did not enter the Billboard Hot 100, but it peaked at number 11 on the Bubbling Under Hot 100 chart.)	—	—	90	—	—	—	—	—	165		Fearless (Taylor's Version)
"The Way I Loved You (Taylor's Version)"	2021	94	89	—	60	—	—	—	—	—	93	ARIA: Platinum; BPI: Silver; RMNZ: Gold	Fearless (Taylor's Version)
"Forever & Always (Taylor's Version)"	2021	65	45	—	37	—	—	—	—	—	41	ARIA: Gold; RMNZ: Gold	Fearless (Taylor's Version)
"The Best Day (Taylor's Version)"	2021	— (Note: "The Best Day (Taylor's Version)" did not enter the Billboard Hot 100, but it peaked at number 19 on the Bubbling Under Hot 100 chart.)	—	—	—	—	—	—	—	—	—		Fearless (Taylor's Version)
"We Were Happy"	2021	— (Note: "We Were Happy" did not enter the Billboard Hot 100, but it peaked at number 15 on the Bubbling Under Hot 100 chart.)	—	—	95	—	—	—	—	—	—		Fearless (Taylor's Version)
"That's When" (featuring Keith Urban)	2021	— (Note: "That's When" did not enter the Billboard Hot 100, but it peaked at number 3 on the Bubbling Under Hot 100 chart.)	81	—	63	—	—	—	—	—	130	ARIA: Gold	Fearless (Taylor's Version)
"Don't You"	2021	— (Note: "Don't You" did not enter the Billboard Hot 100, but it peaked at number 14 on the Bubbling Under Hot 100 chart.)	—	—	96	—	—	—	—	—	—		Fearless (Taylor's Version)
"State of Grace (Taylor's Version)"	2021	18	25	—	9	—	7	12	—	18	12	ARIA: Gold; BPI: Silver; RMNZ: Gold	Red (Taylor's Version)
"Red (Taylor's Version)"	2021	25	12	—	12	—	9	15	—	22	13	ARIA: Platinum; BPI: Silver; RMNZ: Gold	Red (Taylor's Version)
"Treacherous (Taylor's Version)"	2021	54	38	—	41	—	—	—	—	—	42	ARIA: Gold	Red (Taylor's Version)
"I Knew You Were Trouble (Taylor's Version)"	2021	46	21	—	29	—	—	26	—	—	23	ARIA: 2× Platinum; BPI: Gold; RMNZ: Platinum	Red (Taylor's Version)
"22 (Taylor's Version)"	2021	52	27	—	33	—	—	—	—	—	30	ARIA: Platinum; BPI: Silver; RMNZ: Gold	Red (Taylor's Version)
"I Almost Do (Taylor's Version)"	2021	59	45	—	49	—	—	—	—	—	54		Red (Taylor's Version)
"We Are Never Ever Getting Back Together (Taylor's Version)"	2021	55	34	—	40	—	—	—	—	—	41	ARIA: Platinum; RMNZ: Platinum	Red (Taylor's Version)
"Stay Stay Stay (Taylor's Version)"	2021	67	—	—	57	—	—	—	—	—	66		Red (Taylor's Version)
"The Last Time (Taylor's Version)" (featuring Gary Lightbody)	2021	66	—	—	53	—	—	—	—	—	61	ARIA: Gold	Red (Taylor's Version)
"Holy Ground (Taylor's Version)"	2021	76	—	—	62	—	—	—	—	—	77		Red (Taylor's Version)
"Sad Beautiful Tragic (Taylor's Version)"	2021	85	—	—	71	—	—	—	—	—	94		Red (Taylor's Version)
"The Lucky One (Taylor's Version)"	2021	84	—	—	68	—	—	—	—	—	93		Red (Taylor's Version)
"Everything Has Changed (Taylor's Version)" (featuring Ed Sheeran)	2021	63	—	—	51	—	—	—	—	—	59	ARIA: Gold; RMNZ: Gold	Red (Taylor's Version)
"Starlight (Taylor's Version)"	2021	90	—	—	73	—	—	—	—	—	102		Red (Taylor's Version)
"Begin Again (Taylor's Version)"	2021	77	—	—	61	—	—	—	—	—	76		Red (Taylor's Version)
"The Moment I Knew (Taylor's Version)"	2021	83	—	—	67	—	—	—	—	—	95		Red (Taylor's Version)
"Come Back... Be Here (Taylor's Version)"	2021	87	—	—	69	—	—	—	—	—	97		Red (Taylor's Version)
"Girl at Home (Taylor's Version)"	2021	— (Note: "Girl at Home (Taylor's Version)" did not enter the Billboard Hot 100, but it peaked at number 1 on the Bubbling Under Hot 100 chart.)	—	—	76	—	—	—	—	—	118		Red (Taylor's Version)
"Ronan (Taylor's Version)"	2021	— (Note: "Ronan (Taylor's Version)" did not enter the Billboard Hot 100, but it peaked at number 9 on the Bubbling Under Hot 100 chart.)	—	—	88	—	—	—	—	—	142		Red (Taylor's Version)
"Better Man"	2021	51	—	—	36	—	—	—	—	—	46	ARIA: Gold	Red (Taylor's Version)
"Nothing New" (featuring Phoebe Bridgers)	2021	43	31	—	22	—	25	—	—	—	33	ARIA: Platinum; BPI: Silver; RMNZ: Gold	Red (Taylor's Version)
"Babe"	2021	69	—	—	56	—	—	—	—	—	71	ARIA: Gold	Red (Taylor's Version)
"Forever Winter"	2021	79	64	—	64	—	—	—	—	—	87		Red (Taylor's Version)
"Run" (featuring Ed Sheeran)	2021	47	19	—	28	—	—	—	—	—	24	ARIA: Gold; RMNZ: Gold	Red (Taylor's Version)
"The Very First Night"	2021	61	—	—	55	—	—	—	—	—	68	ARIA: Gold; RMNZ: Gold	Red (Taylor's Version)
"Maroon"	2022	3	4	—	4	96	—	5	—	—	4	ARIA: Platinum; BPI: Gold; MC: Platinum; RMNZ: Platinum	Midnights
"You're on Your Own, Kid"	2022	8	6	—	6	—	6	20	—	65	7	ARIA: 2× Platinum; BPI: Platinum; MC: Platinum; RMNZ: Platinum	Midnights
"Midnight Rain"	2022	5	5	52	5	92	44	5	—	—	5	ARIA: 2× Platinum; BPI: Gold; MC: Platinum; RMNZ: Platinum	Midnights
"Vigilante Shit"	2022	10	10	—	9	—	—	—	—	—	9	ARIA: 2× Platinum; BPI: Gold; MC: Gold; RMNZ: Platinum	Midnights
"Labyrinth"	2022	14	13	—	14	—	—	—	—	—	12	ARIA: Platinum; BPI: Silver; MC: Gold; RMNZ: Gold	Midnights
"Sweet Nothing"	2022	15	14	—	15	—	—	—	—	—	14	ARIA: Platinum; BPI: Silver; MC: Gold; RMNZ: Gold	Midnights
"Mastermind"	2022	13	12	—	12	—	—	—	—	—	13	ARIA: Platinum; BPI: Gold; MC: Gold; RMNZ: Platinum	Midnights
"The Great War"	2022	26	—	—	22	—	—	—	—	—	24	ARIA: Platinum; BPI: Silver; RMNZ: Gold	Midnights
"Bigger Than the Whole Sky"	2022	21	—	—	20	—	—	—	—	—	22	ARIA: Gold; BPI: Silver; RMNZ: Gold	Midnights
"Paris"	2022	32	—	—	25	—	—	—	—	—	30	ARIA: Gold; BPI: Silver; RMNZ: Gold	Midnights
"High Infidelity"	2022	33	—	—	28	—	—	—	—	—	31	ARIA: Gold	Midnights
"Glitch"	2022	41	—	—	32	—	—	—	—	—	35	ARIA: Gold	Midnights
"Would've, Could've, Should've"	2022	20	—	—	18	—	—	—	—	—	21	ARIA: Platinum; BPI: Silver; RMNZ: Gold	Midnights
"Dear Reader"	2022	45	—	—	35	—	—	—	—	—	37	ARIA: Gold	Midnights
"Hits Different"	2023	27	16	—	19	—	13	14	—	18	18	ARIA: Platinum; BPI: Silver; RMNZ: Gold	Midnights
"Mine (Taylor's Version)"	2023	15	10	—	15	—	9	11	—	—	13	ARIA: Gold; BPI: Silver; RMNZ: Gold	Speak Now (Taylor's Version)
"Sparks Fly (Taylor's Version)"	2023	22	17	—	25	—	—	20	—	—	20	ARIA: Gold	Speak Now (Taylor's Version)
"Back to December (Taylor's Version)"	2023	16	11	—	17	—	—	10	—	—	10	ARIA: Gold; BPI: Silver; RMNZ: Gold	Speak Now (Taylor's Version)
"Speak Now (Taylor's Version)"	2023	33	22	—	31	—	—	26	—	—	24	ARIA: Gold	Speak Now (Taylor's Version)
"Dear John (Taylor's Version)"	2023	26	26	—	35	—	—	27	—	—	28	ARIA: Gold	Speak Now (Taylor's Version)
"Mean (Taylor's Version)"	2023	39	30	—	41	—	—	28	—	—	33	ARIA: Gold	Speak Now (Taylor's Version)
"The Story of Us (Taylor's Version)"	2023	42	32	—	44	—	—	32	—	—	31	ARIA: Gold	Speak Now (Taylor's Version)
"Never Grow Up (Taylor's Version)"	2023	58	59	—	59	—	—	—	—	—	71		Speak Now (Taylor's Version)
"Enchanted (Taylor's Version)"	2023	19	7	—	18	—	8	15	—	15	11	ARIA: Platinum; BPI: Gold; RMNZ: Gold	Speak Now (Taylor's Version)
"Better than Revenge (Taylor's Version)"	2023	28	14	—	29	—	—	22	—	—	25	ARIA: Gold	Speak Now (Taylor's Version)
"Innocent (Taylor's Version)"	2023	63	75	—	63	—	—	—	—	—	79		Speak Now (Taylor's Version)
"Haunted (Taylor's Version)"	2023	50	48	—	55	—	—	40	—	—	53		Speak Now (Taylor's Version)
"Last Kiss (Taylor's Version)"	2023	57	60	—	60	—	—	—	—	—	65		Speak Now (Taylor's Version)
"Long Live (Taylor's Version)"	2023	53	53	—	58	—	—	—	—	—	55	ARIA: Platinum; BPI: Silver; RMNZ: Gold	Speak Now (Taylor's Version)
"Ours (Taylor's Version)"	2023	68	85	—	65	—	—	—	—	—	91		Speak Now (Taylor's Version)
"Superman (Taylor's Version)"	2023	74	—	—	76	—	—	—	—	—	122		Speak Now (Taylor's Version)
"Electric Touch" (featuring Fall Out Boy)	2023	35	38	—	46	—	—	35	—	—	37		Speak Now (Taylor's Version)
"When Emma Falls in Love"	2023	34	43	—	40	—	—	37	—	—	36		Speak Now (Taylor's Version)
"I Can See You"	2023	5	5	58	8	90	4	4	—	6	4	ARIA: Platinum; BPI: Silver; RMNZ: Gold	Speak Now (Taylor's Version)
"Castles Crumbling" (featuring Hayley Williams)	2023	31	33	—	42	—	—	30	—	—	30		Speak Now (Taylor's Version)
"Foolish One"	2023	40	50	—	50	—	—	39	—	—	49		Speak Now (Taylor's Version)
"Timeless"	2023	48	56	—	53	—	—	—	—	—	60		Speak Now (Taylor's Version)
"Welcome to New York (Taylor's Version)"	2023	14	11	—	15	—	—	14	—	—	16	ARIA: Gold; BPI: Silver	1989 (Taylor's Version)
"Blank Space (Taylor's Version)"	2023	12	9	—	11	—	—	12	—	—	9	ARIA: Platinum; BPI: Silver; RMNZ: Gold	1989 (Taylor's Version)
"Style (Taylor's Version)"	2023	9	7	—	8	—	—	8	—	—	5	ARIA: Gold; BPI: Gold; RMNZ: Platinum	1989 (Taylor's Version)
"Out of the Woods (Taylor's Version)"	2023	16	12	—	14	—	—	16	—	—	15	ARIA: Platinum; BPI: Silver; RMNZ: Gold	1989 (Taylor's Version)
"All You Had to Do Was Stay (Taylor's Version)"	2023	20	—	—	23	—	—	22	—	—	20	ARIA: Gold	1989 (Taylor's Version)
"Shake It Off (Taylor's Version)"	2023	28	18	—	24	—	—	27	—	—	21	ARIA: Platinum; BPI: Silver; RMNZ: Gold	1989 (Taylor's Version)
"I Wish You Would (Taylor's Version)"	2023	31	—	—	32	—	—	30	—	—	26	ARIA: Gold	1989 (Taylor's Version)
"Bad Blood (Taylor's Version)" (solo or featuring Kendrick Lamar)	2023	7	52	—	7	—	—	10	—	—	6	ARIA: Platinum; BPI: Silver; RMNZ: Gold	1989 (Taylor's Version)
"How You Get the Girl (Taylor's Version)"	2023	40	—	—	34	—	—	31	—	—	29	ARIA: Gold	1989 (Taylor's Version)
"I Know Places (Taylor's Version)"	2023	36	—	—	35	—	—	32	—	—	30		1989 (Taylor's Version)
"Clean (Taylor's Version)"	2023	30	—	—	28	—	—	28	—	—	25	ARIA: Gold	1989 (Taylor's Version)
"Wonderland (Taylor's Version)"	2023	39	22	—	37	—	—	36	—	—	32	ARIA: Gold	1989 (Taylor's Version)
"You Are in Love (Taylor's Version)"	2023	43	—	—	42	—	—	38	—	—	38	ARIA: Gold	1989 (Taylor's Version)
"New Romantics (Taylor's Version)"	2023	29	—	—	27	—	—	26	—	—	24	ARIA: Gold; BPI: Silver	1989 (Taylor's Version)
"Say Don't Go"	2023	5	3	—	5	—	—	3	—	—	4	ARIA: Platinum; BPI: Silver; RMNZ: Gold	1989 (Taylor's Version)
"Now That We Don't Talk"	2023	2	2	—	2	—	4	2	—	2	2	ARIA: Platinum; BPI: Silver; RMNZ: Gold	1989 (Taylor's Version)
"Suburban Legends"	2023	10	8	—	10	—	—	9	—	—	14	ARIA: Gold	1989 (Taylor's Version)
"The Tortured Poets Department"	2024	4	3	10	3	—	4	4	10	3	3	ARIA: Platinum; BPI: Silver; RMNZ: Gold	The Tortured Poets Department
"My Boy Only Breaks His Favorite Toys"	2024	6	6	—	6	—	—	7	—	—	6	ARIA: Platinum; BPI: Gold; RMNZ: Gold	The Tortured Poets Department
"Down Bad"	2024	2	2	39	2	—	11	3	43	4	2	ARIA: 2× Platinum; BPI: Gold; RMNZ: Platinum	The Tortured Poets Department
"So Long, London"	2024	5	4	—	5	—	—	5	11	—	4	ARIA: Platinum; BPI: Gold; RMNZ: Platinum	The Tortured Poets Department
"But Daddy I Love Him"	2024	7	7	—	7	—	—	8	—	—	7	ARIA: Platinum; BPI: Gold; RMNZ: Gold	The Tortured Poets Department
"Fresh Out the Slammer"	2024	11	14	—	16	—	—	15	—	—	15	ARIA: Gold; BPI: Silver; RMNZ: Gold	The Tortured Poets Department
"Florida!!!" (featuring Florence and the Machine)	2024	8	8	—	9	—	—	9	—	—	8	ARIA: Platinum; BPI: Silver; RMNZ: Gold	The Tortured Poets Department
"Guilty as Sin?"	2024	10	10	—	13	—	—	11	—	—	11	ARIA: Platinum; BPI: Gold; RMNZ: Platinum	The Tortured Poets Department
"Who's Afraid of Little Old Me?"	2024	9	9	—	10	—	22	10	—	85	9	ARIA: Platinum; BPI: Gold; RMNZ: Platinum	The Tortured Poets Department
"I Can Fix Him (No Really I Can)"	2024	20	19	—	22	—	—	21	—	—	20	ARIA: Gold; BPI: Silver	The Tortured Poets Department
"Loml"	2024	12	15	—	17	—	—	16	—	—	16	ARIA: Platinum; BPI: Gold; RMNZ: Gold	The Tortured Poets Department
"The Smallest Man Who Ever Lived"	2024	14	16	—	18	—	—	17	—	—	18	ARIA: Platinum; BPI: Gold; RMNZ: Gold	The Tortured Poets Department
"The Alchemy"	2024	13	18	—	21	—	—	19	—	—	19	ARIA: Platinum; BPI: Silver; RMNZ: Gold	The Tortured Poets Department
"Clara Bow"	2024	21	20	—	23	—	—	22	—	—	22	ARIA: Gold	The Tortured Poets Department
"The Black Dog"	2024	25	25	—	26	—	—	26	—	—	26	ARIA: Gold; BPI: Silver; RMNZ: Gold	The Tortured Poets Department
"Imgonnagetyouback"	2024	26	23	—	29	—	—	30	—	—	28	ARIA: Gold; BPI: Silver; RMNZ: Gold	The Tortured Poets Department
"The Albatross"	2024	30	29	—	31	—	—	35	—	—	32	ARIA: Gold	The Tortured Poets Department
"Chloe or Sam or Sophia or Marcus"	2024	36	33	—	36	—	—	—	—	—	37	ARIA: Gold	The Tortured Poets Department
"How Did It End?"	2024	35	30	—	35	—	—	38	—	—	36	ARIA: Gold; BPI: Silver; RMNZ: Gold	The Tortured Poets Department
"So High School"	2024	24	26	—	28	—	—	33	—	—	30	ARIA: Platinum; BPI: Silver; RMNZ: Gold	The Tortured Poets Department
"I Hate It Here"	2024	34	37	—	37	—	—	—	—	—	38	ARIA: Gold	The Tortured Poets Department
"Thank You Aimee"	2024	23	28	—	25	—	—	29	—	—	29	ARIA: Gold	The Tortured Poets Department
"I Look in People's Windows"	2024	39	40	—	40	—	—	—	—	—	40	ARIA: Gold	The Tortured Poets Department
"The Prophecy"	2024	32	31	—	33	—	—	37	—	—	34	ARIA: Gold; BPI: Silver; RMNZ: Gold	The Tortured Poets Department
"Cassandra"	2024	44	49	—	44	—	—	—	—	—	44	ARIA: Gold	The Tortured Poets Department
"Peter"	2024	46	46	—	45	—	—	—	—	—	43	ARIA: Gold	The Tortured Poets Department
"The Bolter"	2024	47	51	—	46	—	—	—	—	—	46	ARIA: Gold	The Tortured Poets Department
"Robin"	2024	55	55	—	53	—	—	—	—	—	57		The Tortured Poets Department
"The Manuscript"	2024	51	53	—	51	—	—	—	—	—	50	ARIA: Gold	The Tortured Poets Department
"Us" (Gracie Abrams featuring Taylor Swift)	2024	36	25	—	31	—	35	30	—	37	34	ARIA: Platinum; BPI: Silver; MC: Platinum; RMNZ: Gold	The Secret of Us
"Father Figure"	2025	4	4	—	4	5	85	4	—	—	4	ARIA: Platinum; BPI: Silver; MC: Platinum; RMNZ: Gold	The Life of a Showgirl
"Eldest Daughter"	2025	9	10	—	9	8	—	10	—	—	11	ARIA: Gold; BPI: Silver; MC: Platinum; RMNZ: Gold	The Life of a Showgirl
"Ruin the Friendship"	2025	11	11	—	11	—	—	12	—	—	12	ARIA: Gold; BPI: Silver; MC: Platinum; RMNZ: Gold	The Life of a Showgirl
"Actually Romantic"	2025	7	8	—	8	10	—	9	—	—	10	ARIA: Gold; BPI: Silver; MC: Platinum; RMNZ: Gold	The Life of a Showgirl
"Wish List"	2025	6	9	—	9	—	—	10	—	—	7	ARIA: Gold; BPI: Silver; MC: Platinum; RMNZ: Gold	The Life of a Showgirl
"Wood"	2025	5	5	—	5	—	—	6	—	—	6	ARIA: Gold; BPI: Silver; MC: Platinum; RMNZ: Gold	The Life of a Showgirl
"Cancelled!"	2025	10	7	—	7	7	—	8	—	—	9	ARIA: Gold; BPI: Silver; MC: Platinum; RMNZ: Gold	The Life of a Showgirl
"Honey"	2025	12	12	—	12	—	—	14	—	—	13	ARIA: Gold; BPI: Silver; MC: Platinum; RMNZ: Gold	The Life of a Showgirl
"The Life of a Showgirl" (featuring Sabrina Carpenter)	2025	8	6	—	6	9	—	7	—	46	8	ARIA: Gold; BPI: Gold; MC: Platinum; RMNZ: Gold	The Life of a Showgirl
"Cleveland!"	2026	3	3	6	4	13	9	6	13	3	2		The Life of a Showgirl: The Encore
"Pink Clouding"	2026	5	5	—	5	15	—	8	—	—	5		The Life of a Showgirl: The Encore
"Babylon"	2026	4	4	7	3	16	10	7	14	4	4		The Life of a Showgirl: The Encore
"—" denotes a recording that did not chart in that territory.

== See also ==
- List of Billboard Hot 100 chart achievements and milestones
- List of artists who have achieved simultaneous number-one single and album in the United States
- List of artists who have achieved simultaneous UK and US number-one hits
