= Joe Alwyn =

English actor (born 1991)

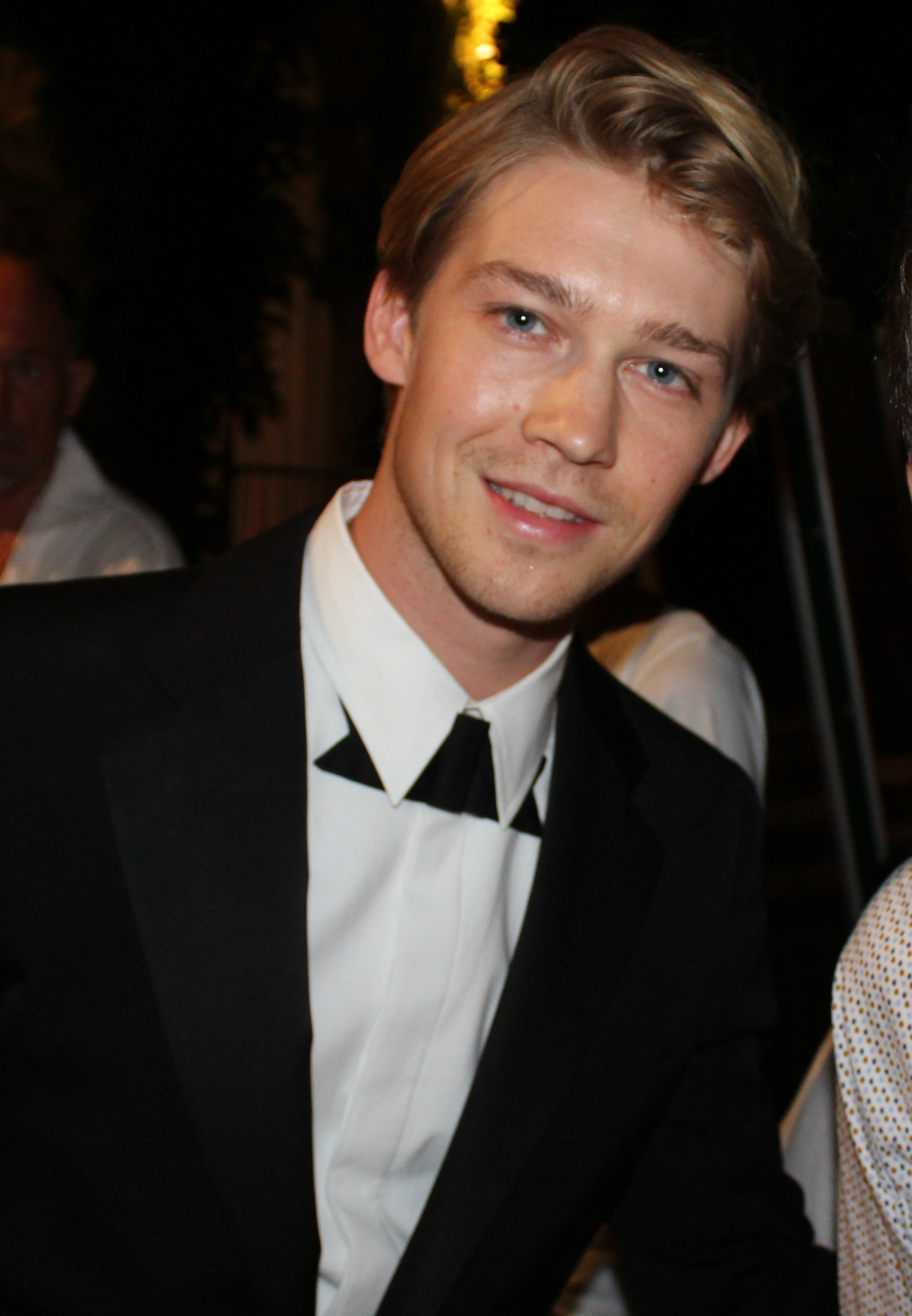
- Alwyn in 2022
- Born: Joseph Matthew Alwyn; 21 February 1991 (age 35); Royal Tunbridge Wells, Kent, England
- Other name: William Bowery (Note: Alwyn used his songwriting pseudonym, William Bowery, for co-writer credits in songs with Taylor Swift. He used his original name for co-producer credits.)
- Education: University of Bristol; Royal Central School of Speech & Drama
- Occupations: Actor; record producer; songwriter
- Years active: 2015–present
- Relatives: William Alwyn (great-grandfather); Jonathan Alwyn (grandfather); Nicholas Alwyn (great-uncle); Dennis Barker (uncle)

Joseph Matthew Alwyn (born 21 February 1991) is an English actor. Alwyn made his feature film debut as the titular character in Ang Lee's 2016 war drama Billy Lynn's Long Halftime Walk and has since played supporting roles in films such as The Favourite (2018), Boy Erased (2018), Mary Queen of Scots (2018), Harriet (2019), Catherine Called Birdy (2022), The Brutalist (2024), and Hamnet (2025). He was one of the two leads of the BBC and Hulu drama series Conversations with Friends (2022).

Born in Kent and raised in North London, Alwyn developed an interest in acting during his teenage years. He acted in student productions at Edinburgh Festival Fringe, and obtained BA degrees in English literature and drama, and acting, from the University of Bristol (2012), and the Royal Central School of Speech and Drama (2015), respectively. Alwyn dated the American singer-songwriter Taylor Swift from 2016 to 2023, and contributed to ten of her songs released from 2020 to 2022, including "Exile" and "Betty" from Swift's eighth studio album, Folklore, which won the Album of the Year at the 63rd Annual Grammy Awards. He won a Trophée Chopard at the 2018 Cannes Film Festival and appeared on the 2022 Time 100 Next list of rising stars.

== Early life and education ==
Joseph Matthew Alwyn was born on 21 February 1991 in Tunbridge Wells, Kent, England. Raised in North London, Alwyn is the son of a psychotherapist mother and a documentary filmmaker father. He is the great-grandson of composers William Alwyn and Olive Alwyn. His great uncle was priest and peace activist Bruce Kent.

Alwyn was privately educated at the City of London School. He briefly took guitar lessons, and was part of a school band called Anger Management. He later played football and rugby at school. Although an "introverted" child, Alwyn knew he wanted to be an actor. He auditioned for a small role in Love Actually, but was not cast. In his late teens, he joined the National Youth Theatre. While studying for a Bachelor of Arts (BA) in English literature and drama at the University of Bristol, he acted in two student productions at the Edinburgh Fringe Festival. After graduating in 2012, he applied to four drama schools, and was accepted by the Royal Central School of Speech and Drama, where he completed a BA degree in acting. In his third year there, Alwyn signed with an agent who had seen him in a student showcase, and helped him get cast in the role of the title character in Billy Lynn's Long Halftime Walk (2016): his debut in a feature film.

== Career ==
=== Acting ===
In early 2015, Alwyn was cast in the lead role of Taiwanese director Ang Lee's 2016 war drama film, Billy Lynn's Long Halftime Walk, which is a film adaptation of the 2012 novel of the same name by American writer Ben Fountain. Lee stated that he selected Alwyn because of his "ability to communicate the book's paradox of war with just his facial expressions". Alwyn came to the United States for the first time after passing the film's auditions. He stated that he didn't "exactly fit" the casting requirements of the role, which were "a 19-year-old U.S. Army grunt"; Alwyn said he had long blond hair and was "a lot skinnier" when he auditioned. In reviews of the film, critics praised Alwyn's performance for its naturalism. Journalists went on to describe the film as his "breakout". He then played a supporting role in the 2017 mystery drama film The Sense of an Ending, directed by Indian filmmaker Ritesh Batra.

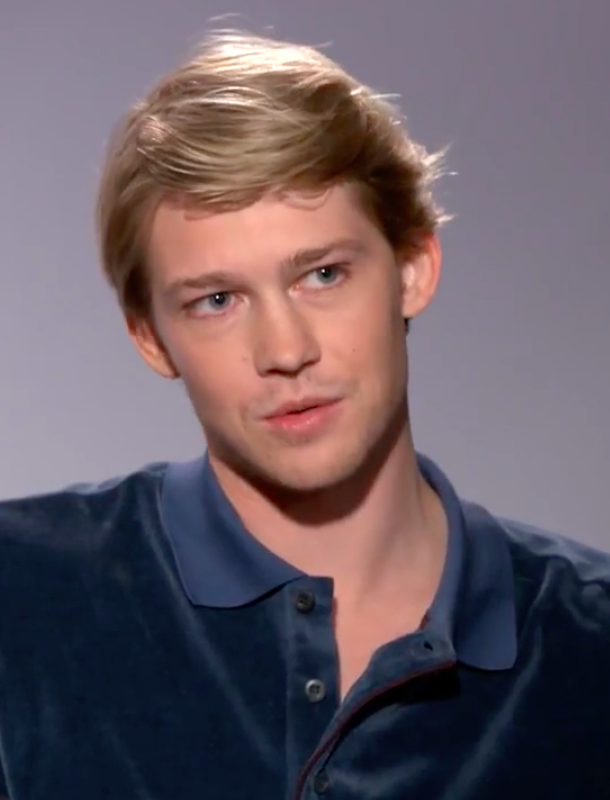
Alwyn in August 2018

Alwyn appeared in a number of 2018 films. He played a supporting role as the British nobleman Samuel Masham in the period black comedy film The Favourite, directed by Greek filmmaker Yorgos Lanthimos. The film garnered 10 nominations at the 91st Academy Awards. Lauren McCarthy of W magazine praised Alwyn's physical humour and silly acting style in the film, in contrast to his "boy-next-door-meets-movie-star-hearthrob looks". He played a supporting role in Chris Weitz's historical drama Operation Finale, and a minor role in Joel Edgerton's Boy Erased—a biographical drama film based on a 2016 memoir by American LGBT+ activist Garrard Conley. Alwyn then appeared as English statesman Robert Dudley in the historical drama Mary Queen of Scots. Alwyn won the Trophée Chopard alongside Australian actress Elizabeth Debicki at the 2018 Cannes Film Festival.

In 2019, Alwyn played a slave owner in Harriet, a biographical drama about Harriet Tubman. He appeared as Bob Cratchit in the dark fantasy television miniseries A Christmas Carol, based on Charles Dickens' 1843 novella of the same name. In 2021, he had a minor role in drama film The Souvenir Part II, and played a 1960s industrialist in the film adaptation of Jojo Moyes' 2008 romantic novel, The Last Letter from Your Lover.

In 2022, Alwyn starred in the drama series Conversations with Friends—a Hulu adaptation of the 2017 novel of the same name by Irish author Sally Rooney. Alwyn was paired with Margaret Qualley in the romantic thriller film Stars at Noon, directed by French filmmaker Claire Denis, and played the titular character's uncle in Catherine Called Birdy, a medieval comedy film directed by Lena Dunham, based on the 1994 children's novel of the same name; both the films were met with generally positive reviews, with the former premiering at the 2022 Cannes Film Festival and winning the Grand Prix.

In late 2022, Eimear McBride wrote and directed A Very Short Film About Longing. The film was screened at the 2023 BFI London Film Festival. It starred Alwyn, Natalia Kostrzewa and Lashay Anderson and was soundtracked by Tindersticks. In 2024, Alwyn played a supporting role in Kinds of Kindness, an anthology film directed by Greek filmmaker Yorgos Lanthimos. He also co-starred as Harry Lee Van Buren in Brady Corbet’s epic The Brutalist, earning acclaim for his portrayal of the entitled son.

In 2025, Alwyn made his professional stage debut as Heath in a modern adaptation of Henrik Ibsen’s ‘‘The Lady from the Sea’’ at the Bridge Theatre in London, appearing opposite Alicia Vikander and Andrew Lincoln. He received a nomination for Best Supporting Performer in a Play at the 2026 WhatsOnStage Awards for his performance. Later that year he appeared as Bartholomew in Chloé Zhao's Hamnet, a period drama based on Maggie O’Farrell’s novel. The film received widespread critical acclaim and earned eight nominations at the 98th Academy Awards, including for Best Picture, with co-star Jessie Buckley winning Best Actress. He also starred as Laertes in the modern adaptation of Shakespeare’s ‘‘Hamlet’’ opposite Riz Ahmed in the title role.

=== Music ===
While in a relationship with American singer-songwriter Taylor Swift, Alwyn contributed to the production of ten of her songs released from 2020 to 2022. Alwyn stated that "it came about from messing around on a piano, and singing badly," and then "being overheard by Swift, and being, like, 'Let's see what happens if we get to the end of it together'". He is credited as co-producer of the songs "Exile", "Betty", "My Tears Ricochet", "August", "This Is Me Trying" and "Illicit Affairs" on Swift's eighth studio album, Folklore (2020); and was also co-writer of "Exile" and "Betty", under the pseudonym William Bowery. "Exile" reached the top 10 of the charts in various countries, including number six on the US Billboard Hot 100 and number eight on the UK Singles Chart.

At the 63rd Annual Grammy Awards in 2021, Folklore won the Album of the Year, earning Alwyn his first Grammy Award for his producing credit on the record. Credited as Bowery, Alwyn also co-wrote "Champagne Problems", "Coney Island" and the title track on Swift's second 2020 album, Evermore. In April 2022, Alwyn revealed to The Wall Street Journal that the name "William Bowery" was derived from the first name of his great-grandfather William Alwyn, who was a music composer, and the last name in honour of the New York City neighbourhood Bowery, where he had spent "a lot of time" when he first arrived in the U.S. On Swift's tenth studio album, Midnights (2022), he is credited as co-writer of "Sweet Nothing", again as Bowery.

=== Advocacy ===
Alwyn has posted on social media, particularly on Instagram, about the 2023 Gaza war and raise awareness, including Palestinian charities and Disaster Emergency Committee (DEC). He signed the Artists4Ceasefire letter addressed to then U.S. President Joe Biden and wore the collective's pin at various public events. Alwyn was one of the initial signatories of the Film Workers for Palestine boycott pledge, published in September 2025, pledging not to work with Israeli film institutions "that are implicated in genocide and apartheid against the Palestinian people". In 2025, in response to the Supreme Court of the United Kingdom ruling on the definition of woman in the Equality Act and subsequent EHRC guidance, Alwyn was one of over 400 film and television professionals to sign an open letter pledging "solidarity with the trans, non-binary and intersex communities" and condemning both actions.

== Personal life ==
Alwyn keeps his personal life private, which he described as a "knee-jerk response to the culture we live in". GQ labelled him a "notoriously low-key actor". Alwyn's relationship with Swift began in 2016 and they broke-up in 2023. He has been in a relationship with the American actress Sarah Pidgeon since 2026.

== Work ==
Key
†	Denotes works that have not yet been released

=== Film ===
Year	Title	Role	Notes	Ref.
2016	Billy Lynn's Long Halftime Walk	Billy Lynn		
2017	The Sense of an Ending	Adrian Finn		
2018	Operation Finale	Klaus Eichmann		
2018	The Favourite	Samuel Masham		
2018	Boy Erased	Henry Wallace		
2018	Mary Queen of Scots	Robert Dudley		
2019	Harriet	Gideon Brodess		
2020	Miss Americana	Himself	Documentary	
2021	The Souvenir Part II	Max		
2021	The Last Letter from Your Lover	Laurence Stirling		
2022	Stars at Noon	Daniel DeHaven		
2022	Catherine Called Birdy	George		
2023	A Very Short Film About Longing	Paul	Short film	
2024	Kinds of Kindness	Collectibles appraiser 1 / Jerry / Joseph		
2024	The Brutalist	Harry Lee Van Buren		
2025	Hamnet	Bartholomew Hathaway		
2025	Hamlet	Laertes		
2027	Panic Carefully †	TBA	Post-production	
TBA	Séance on a Wet Afternoon †	TBA	Post-production	
TBA	The Origin of the World †	TBA	Filming	
TBA	Still We Met †	TBA	Filming	
TBA	Cavendish †	TBA	Pre-production	

=== Television ===
Year	Title	Role	Notes	Ref.
2019	A Christmas Carol	Bob Cratchit	Miniseries; 3 episodes	
2022	Conversations with Friends	Nick Conway	Main role; 12 episodes	
TBA	The Husbands †	TBA		
TBA	Legacy of Spies †	Jim Prideaux		

=== Theatre ===
Year	Title	Role	Ref.
2025	The Lady from the Sea	Heath	

=== Songs ===
Year	Album	Song	Credit	Ref.
2020	Folklore	"Exile"	Co-writer	
2020	Folklore	"My Tears Ricochet"	Co-producer	
2020	Folklore	"August"	Co-producer	
2020	Folklore	"This Is Me Trying"	Co-producer	
2020	Folklore	"Illicit Affairs"	Co-producer	
2020	Folklore	"Betty"	Co-writer; co-producer	
2020	Evermore	"Champagne Problems"	Co-writer	
2020	Evermore	"Coney Island"	Co-writer	
2020	Evermore	"Evermore"	Co-writer	
2022	Midnights	"Sweet Nothing"	Co-writer	

== Accolades ==
List of awards and nominations received by Alwyn
Award	Year	Category	Nominated work	Result	Ref.
Actor Awards	2026	Outstanding Cast in a Motion Picture	Hamnet	Nominated	
WhatsOnStage Awards	2026	Best Supporting Performance in a Play	The Lady From The Sea	Nominated	
North Dakota Film Society	2026	Best Ensemble	Hamnet	Nominated	
Newport Beach Film Festival	2025	Spotlight Recognition Award	The Brutalist	Won	
Austin Film Critics Association	2019	Best Ensemble	The Favourite	Nominated	
BMI London Awards	2021	Most Performed Songs of the Year	"Betty"	Won	
BMI London Awards	2022	Most Performed Songs of the Year	"Exile"	Won	
BMI London Awards	2024	Most Performed Songs of the Year	"Sweet Nothing"	Won	
Boston Society of Film Critics	2018	Best Cast	The Favourite	Runner-up	
Cannes Film Festival	2018	Trophée Chopard	Himself	Won	
Critics' Choice Movie Awards	2019	Best Acting Ensemble	The Favourite	Won	
Detroit Film Critics Society	2018	Best Ensemble	The Favourite	Nominated	
Florida Film Critics Circle Awards	2018	Best Ensemble	The Favourite	Won	
Georgia Film Critics Association	2019	Best Ensemble	The Favourite	Won	
Grammy Awards	2021	Album of the Year	Folklore	Won	
International Cinephile Society	2019	Best Ensemble	The Favourite	Nominated	
New York Film Critics Online	2018	Best Ensemble Cast	The Favourite	Won	
San Diego Film Critics Society Awards	2018	Best Ensemble	Boy Erased	Nominated	
San Diego Film Critics Society Awards	2018	Best Ensemble	The Favourite	Runner-up	
Satellite Awards	2019	Best Ensemble – Motion Picture	The Favourite	Won	
Seattle Film Critics Society	2018	Best Ensemble Cast	The Favourite	Nominated	
Washington D.C. Area Film Critics Association	2018	Best Acting Ensemble	The Favourite	Won	
Washington D.C. Area Film Critics Association	2025	Best Ensemble	Hamnet	Nominated	
Women Film Critics Circle	2018	Best Ensemble	The Favourite	Nominated	
