= My Tears Ricochet =

2020 song by Taylor Swift

Song by Taylor Swift

from the album Folklore
- Released: July 24, 2020
- Studio: Kitty Committee Studio (Los Angeles); Long Pond (Hudson Valley)
- Genre: Arena-goth; gospel
- Length: 4:15
- Label: Republic
- Songwriter: Taylor Swift
- Producers: Taylor Swift; Jack Antonoff; Joe Alwyn (Note: In the liner notes of Folklore, only Swift and Antonoff are credited as producers. The Recording Academy recognized Alwyn as the track's co-producer after Folklore won Album of the Year at the 63rd Annual Grammy Awards.)

Lyric video
- "My Tears Ricochet" on YouTube

"My Tears Ricochet" (stylized in all lowercase) is a song written and recorded by the American singer-songwriter Taylor Swift for her eighth studio album, Folklore (2020). She produced the song with Jack Antonoff and Joe Alwyn. "My Tears Ricochet" infuses arena and gothic styles of rock music and gospel. The production incorporates choir-inflected layered vocals, mellow synths, and shuddering drums, bringing forth a soundscape that critics described as haunting and sorrowful. Its lyrics are a narration by the ghost of a dead woman, who finds her murderer, who she once loved dearly, at her own funeral.

Critics received "My Tears Ricochet" with rave reviews, who praised the concept, imagery, emotion, vocals and production. Upon release, the song peaked at number 16 on the US Billboard Hot 100 and in the top 15 of the singles charts in Australia, Canada, Malaysia and Singapore. "My Tears Ricochet" was included on the set list of Swift's sixth headlining concert tour, the Eras Tour (2023–2024).

== Background and release ==
"My Tears Ricochet" was the first track written for the album, penned by Swift alone. Album co-producer Aaron Dessner regarded the song as a "beacon" for the record. In an interview with Entertainment Weekly, Swift said that, following the sale of her master recordings to Scooter Braun, narratives around divorce had been triggering her, and she incorporated imagery of the end of marriage into "My Tears Ricochet", writing the first lines of the song after watching the 2019 film Marriage Story, which tells the story of a divorce.

I found myself being very triggered by any stories, movies, or narratives revolving around divorce, which felt weird because I haven't experienced it directly. There's no reason it should cause me so much pain, but all of a sudden it felt like something I had been through. I think that happens any time you've been in a 15-year relationship and it ends in a messy, upsetting way. So I wrote "My Tears Ricochet" and I was using a lot of imagery that I had conjured up while comparing a relationship ending to when people end an actual marriage. All of a sudden this person that you trusted more than anyone in the world is the person that can hurt you the worst. Then all of a sudden the things that you have been through together, hurt. All of a sudden, the person who was your best friend is now your biggest nemesis, etc. etc. etc. I think I wrote some of the first lyrics to that song after watching Marriage Story and hearing about when marriages go wrong and end in such a catastrophic way.

— Swift on how "My Tears Ricochet" stemmed from her dispute with Big Machine, Entertainment Weekly

Swift announced her eighth studio album, Folklore, on July 23, 2020. She revealed the track-list, where "My Tears Ricochet" placed fifth. In the primer that preceded the release, Swift described "My Tears Ricochet" as imageries of "an embittered tormentor showing up at the funeral of his fallen object of obsession" and "battleships sinking down into the ocean, down, down, down".

== Composition and lyrics ==
"My Tears Ricochet" is an icy arena-goth and gospel ballad with hints of synth-pop, about the specter of a dead woman haunting her murderer. The track subsequently utilized funereal symbolism to depict the effect of total betrayal. The song sees Swift's vocals range from C_{3} to F_{5}, and was written in a C major key with a moderate tempo of 130 beats per minute. It encompasses a twinkling music box, backing choir, reverbed ad-libs in the bridge, and reaches a tumultuous climax over shuddering drums. Backing vocals on the track are provided by the producer Jack Antonoff.

Lyrically, "My Tears Ricochet" sees the narrator question whether they deserve their mistreatment, and admit that she chose not to "go with grace" by haunting the memorial. The song enquires why the former lover chose to attend her funeral despite "cursing [her] name" and compares their disoriented relationship to sunken battleships in the sea. The song's lyrics and symbols reference Swift's masters dispute, and the bitter ending of her ties with the founder of Big Machine, Scott Borchetta. Apart from the overarching funeral motif, Swift uses the imagery of battleships sinking into an ocean, to draw a dramatic picture of how it feels to make one wrong move and lose something enormous.

== Critical reception ==
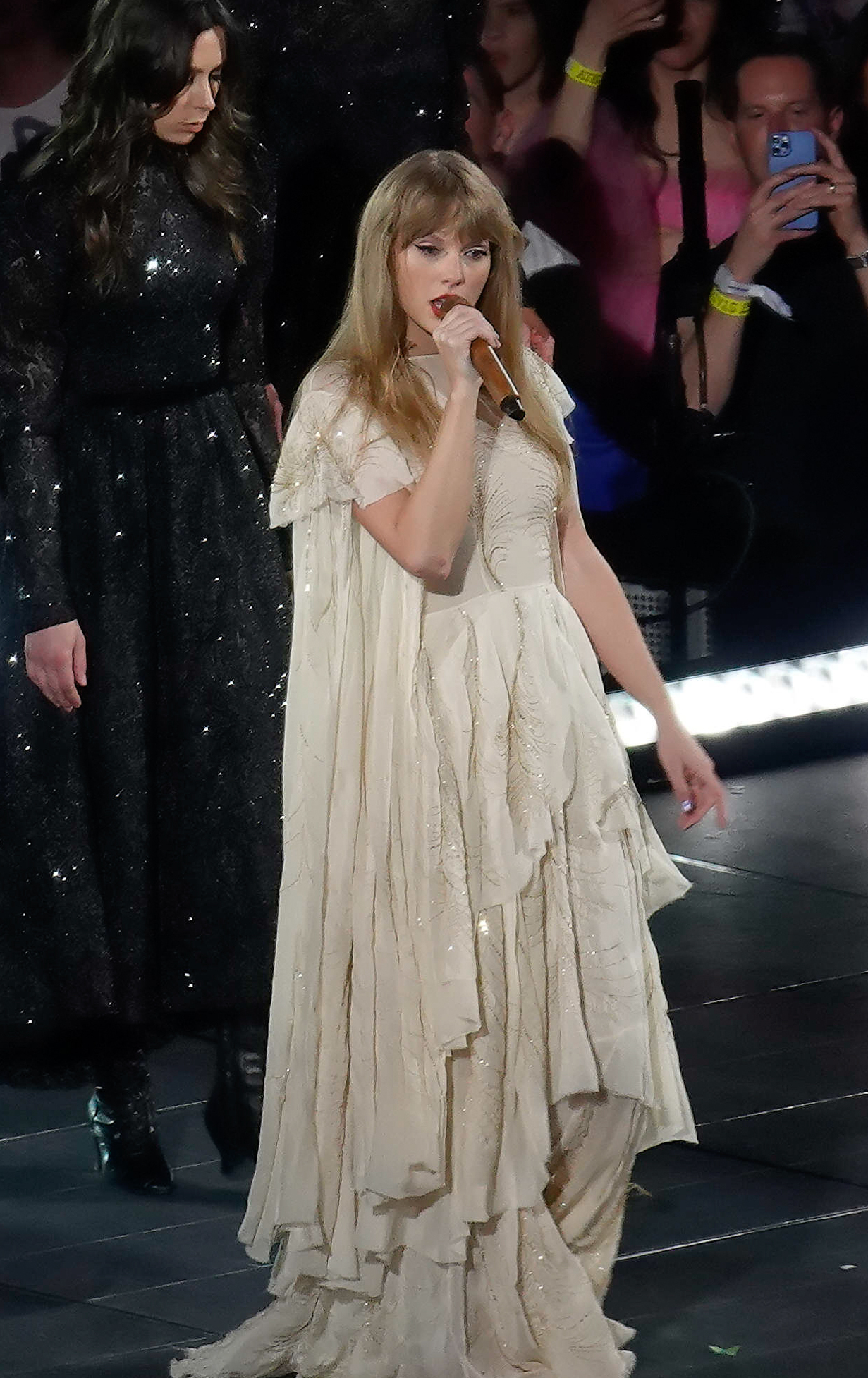
Swift performing "My Tears Ricochet" on the Eras Tour (2023)

"My Tears Ricochet" received widespread acclaim from music critics, praising the song's concept, lyrics, imagery, emotion, Swift's vocals and production. Writing for NME, Hannah Mylrea drew comparisons between "My Tears Ricochet" and "Clean" from Swift's record 1989, remarking that "a megawatt pop song is encased in layered vocals and twinkling music box instrumentals". Jody Rosen of the Los Angeles Times said in a review that the track built up to "a tumultuous climax", and that the track was "goth, like Chartres Cathedral is goth". Billboard's Jason Lipshutz wrote that the song "builds into a sorrowful anthem", and that "a bitter parting becomes a literal death". In a piece for Slant Magazine, Eric Mason named this track "one of Folklore’s most straightforwardly resentful stories", saying that "the sharp beats of strings on the chorus recall the bridges of early-2010s Swift songs", comparing it with "Mad Woman" and "Cruel Summer". Ann Powers of NPR deemed the song "more sophisticated" than Swift's previous writing while remaining "classic Taylor Swift", and stated that the singer takes an event "specific almost only to her, and opens it up into something universal ... because we have all experienced a sense of betrayal and loss of self-ownership." Lucy Harbron of Clash wrote "My Tears Ricochet" is one of Swift's most "gut-wrenching" songs; she said the track "turns into a funeral lament that perfectly vocalises all the sadness and anger and displacement that comes with a mega heartbreak."

== Commercial performance ==
Driven by Folklore's release, "My Tears Ricochet" opened at number 16 on the US Billboard Hot 100, amongst the album's 10 tracks to chart inside the top 40 and five to enter the top 20; it charted for two weeks before its exit. The song further reached number 3 on the Hot Rock & Alternative Songs chart. It also reached number 7 on the Singaporean and Malaysian singles charts, number 8 on Australia's ARIA Singles Chart, and number 14 on the Canadian Hot 100.

== Usage in media ==
- The song appears in the trailer and the soundtrack for the film It Ends with Us (2024), starring Swift's friend Blake Lively, and later in the film itself.
- Additionally, the song gained renewed attention during Swift’s Eras Tour, where it was performed as part of the setlist. The live performance featured haunting visuals, including a dimly lit stage and shadowy imagery, which amplified the song’s funereal themes. The performance was later included in The Eras Tour concert film, showcasing its emotional intensity to a broader audience.

== Credits and personnel ==
Credits are adapted from Tidal, except where noted.

- Taylor Swift – vocals, songwriting, production
- Jack Antonoff – backing vocals, production, recording, live drums, percussion, programming, electric guitars, keyboards, piano, bass
- Joe Alwyn – production
- Laura Sisk – recording
- John Rooney – assistant engineering
- Jon Sher – assistant engineering
- Serban Ghenea – mixing
- Randy Merrill – mastering
- Evan Smith – saxophones, keyboards, programming
- Bobby Hawk – strings

== Charts ==
=== Weekly charts ===
Chart performance for "My Tears Ricochet"
Chart (2020)	Peak position
Australia (ARIA)	8
Canada Hot 100 (Billboard)	14
Malaysia (RIM)	7
Portugal (AFP)	79
Singapore (RIAS)	7
Sweden (Sverigetopplistan)	97
UK Audio Streaming (Official Charts)	20
US Billboard Hot 100	16
US Hot Rock & Alternative Songs (Billboard)	3
US Rolling Stone Top 100	7

=== Year-end charts ===
Year-end chart performance for "My Tears Ricochet"
Chart (2020)	Position
US Hot Rock & Alternative Songs (Billboard)	23

== Certifications ==
Certifications for "My Tears Ricochet"
Region	Certification	Certified units/sales
Australia (ARIA)	3× Platinum	210,000^{‡}
Brazil (Pro-Música Brasil)	Platinum	40,000^{‡}
Denmark (IFPI Danmark)	Gold	45,000^{‡}
New Zealand (RMNZ)	2× Platinum	60,000^{‡}
Spain (Promusicae)	Gold	30,000^{‡}
United Kingdom (BPI)	Platinum	600,000^{‡}
^{‡} Sales+streaming figures based on certification alone.
