= Sweet Nothing (Taylor Swift song) =

2022 song by Taylor Swift

Song by Taylor Swift

from the album Midnights
- Released: October 21, 2022
- Studio: Rough Customer (Brooklyn); Electric Lady (New York)
- Genre: Soft rock
- Length: 3:08
- Label: Republic
- Songwriters: Taylor Swift; William Bowery
- Producers: Taylor Swift; Jack Antonoff

Lyric video
- "Sweet Nothing" on YouTube

"Sweet Nothing" is a song by the American singer-songwriter Taylor Swift from her tenth studio album, Midnights (2022). She wrote the song with Joe Alwyn, who is credited under the pseudonym William Bowery, and produced it with Jack Antonoff. A 1970s-influenced soft rock ballad, "Sweet Nothing" has an electronic piano-led production accentuated by saxophones and clarinets. In the lyrics, Swift's narrator appreciates her partner's calming presence and simple gestures amidst the chaos of the outer world.

Music critics praised the intimate, vulnerable sentiments and the tender sound of "Sweet Nothing". Some reviews deemed it one of the best tracks of Midnights, and Esquire ranked it among the best songs of 2022. "Sweet Nothing" peaked at number 14 on the Billboard Global 200 and reached the top 20 on the singles charts in Australia, Canada, the Philippines, Singapore, and the United States. The track received certifications in Australia, Brazil, Canada, New Zealand, and the United Kingdom. Swift performed the song twice on her sixth concert tour, the Eras Tour (2023–2024).

== Background and release ==
Taylor Swift announced her tenth original studio album, Midnights, at the 2022 MTV Video Music Awards on August 28; its title and cover artwork were released shortly after via social media. She conceived Midnights as a collection of songs about her nocturnal ruminations, detailing a wide range of emotions such as regret, lust, nostalgia, contentment, and self-loathing. The standard album was produced by Swift and Jack Antonoff, as a result of the two experimenting with music while their partners were both shooting for a film in Panama. The album's track listing was revealed via a thirteen-episode video series called Midnights Mayhem with Me on the platform TikTok, where each video contained the title of one track at a time.

The title of "Sweet Nothing" was revealed in the October 7, 2022, episode. Republic Records released Midnights on October 21, 2022; "Sweet Nothing" is number 12 on the standard track listing. A "Piano remix" of the song is included on the Lavender Edition deluxe CDs of the album, released exclusively via Target stores. "Sweet Nothing" peaked at number 14 on the Billboard Global 200. The song reached the top 20 on the charts in the Philippines (12), Australia (14), the United States (14), Canada (15), Singapore (15), and Malaysia (16); and the top 40 in Vietnam (27) and Portugal (34). It was certified platinum in Australia; gold in Brazil, Canada, and New Zealand; and silver in the United Kingdom.

Swift performed "Sweet Nothing" live twice as a "surprise song" outside the regular set list on her sixth concert tour, the Eras Tour (2023–2024). She sang it on piano at the Mexico City concert on August 24, 2023, and as part of a piano mashup with her 2020 track "Hoax" at the Dublin concert on June 28, 2024.

== Composition and lyrics ==
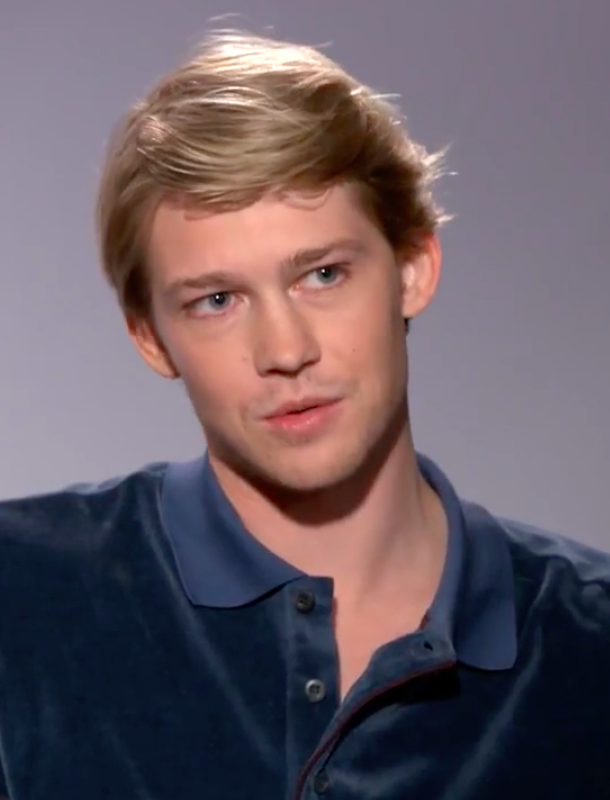
Joe Alwyn co-wrote "Sweet Nothing".

Swift wrote "Sweet Nothing" with her partner at the time, Joe Alwyn, who is credited under the pseudonym William Bowery. She produced the track with Jack Antonoff, who also engineered and programmed it and played drums, piano, and synthesizers (Moog, Juno 6, Prophet 5). Evan Smith played other instruments including organ, saxophone, flute, and clarinet, and he recorded his performance at Pleasure Hill Recording, Portland, Maine. Antonoff and Laura Sisk recorded "Sweet Nothing" at Rough Customer Studio, Brooklyn and Electric Lady Studios, New York City. The track was mixed by Serban Ghenea, assisted by Bryce Bordone, at Sterling Sound, Edgewater, New Jersey, and mastered by Randy Merrill at MixStar Studios, Virginia Beach, Virginia.

At three minutes and eight seconds long, "Sweet Nothing" is a ballad with a spare arrangement driven by a tinkling electric piano throughout, over which Swift sing-speaks. It features accents of a Moog synthesizer and intermittent saxophone, flute, and clarinet, which become progressively prominent towards its third and final refrain. The simplistic and acoustic arrangement of "Sweet Nothing" sets it apart from the heavy programmed synth sounds of Midnights. The music critics Carl Wilson and Annie Zaleski opined that the track is styled after 1970s ballads; the latter dubbed it a soft rock song evoking a warm and cozy atmosphere, reminiscent of the sounds of Swift's 2020 albums Folklore and Evermore. Giselle Au-Nhien Nguyen of The Sydney Morning Herald said that "Sweet Nothing" has a bedroom pop "aesthetic".

The title is based on the phrasing "sweet nothings", which denotes insubstantial romantic gestures only meant to flatter or seduce. It is a double entendre for the song's actual lyrical content: Swift's narrator appreciates her lover for not expecting anything from her and describes him as a calm and reliable presence amidst the chaotic world outside. The couple find solace in small yet meaningful memories, such as a pebble that they picked up in Wicklow "last July" as a souvenir, and the small home they made together ("You're in the kitchen humming"). The relationship acts as a shelter for the narrator from the cunning businesspeople and her own critical inner voices ("Industry disruptors and soul deconstructors/ And smooth-talking hucksters out glad-handing each other"). Throughout, the narrator appreciates her partner for demanding nothing from her and the "sweet nothings" that make the relationship grounded.

According to USA Today's Melissa Ruggieri and Pitchfork's Quinn Moreland, "Sweet Nothing" is structured similar to a nursery rhyme. Jon Caramanica of The New York Times described the track as a "playground lullaby". The domestic setting in a kitchen evokes some of Swift's past songs such as "All Too Well" (2012) and "Cornelia Street" (2019), as discussed by Vox's Rebecca Jennings. For Dork's Abigail Firth, the emotional warmth and intimacy at home with a loving partner in "Sweet Nothing" harkens back to Swift's 2017 song "New Year's Day". Liam E. Semler, a professor in Early Modern English, drew parallels between "Sweet Nothing" and William Shakespeare's Sonnet 29, as both works celebrate intimacy as a defense against the chaotic outer world drawing on autobiographical narratives.

== Critical reception ==
Several reviews selected "Sweet Nothing" as a highlight of Midnights. Some critics who were fond of the simple arrangement found it charming and affecting, including Nguyen, The Line of Best Fit's Paul Bridgewater, and Entertainment Weekly's Marc Hirsh. Alex Bilmes of Esquire considered the track pretty, and Neil McCormick of The Daily Telegraph thought that the track showcases Swift's effortless songcraft, labelling it the album's best song. In Business Insider, Callie Ahlgrim and Courteney Larocca appreciated the vintage and nostalgic feel of the electric-piano production. Firth described the track as a "quiet delight" and compared the horns in the final refrain to "the sun cracking through the blinds".

Swift's vocals and language were a point of praise for Rick Quinn from PopMatters, who lauded the way she turns her voice into a rhythmic instrument by experimenting with "where the emphatic accent falls", and Ludovic Hunter-Tilney from the Financial Times, who was impressed by how Swift sounds both conversational and "highly tuneful" and her "wonderfully deft use of tone and phrasing". Caramanica was critical of the vocal manipulations throughout Midnights, but he appreciated Swift's singing in "Sweet Nothing" for using her "signature wide-eyed vulnerability". The simple romantic gestures depicted in the lyrics were highlighted by Alex Hopper of American Songwriter and Jason Lipshutz of Billboard, who ranked "Sweet Nothing" eighth among the 13 tracks on Midnights.

Esquire placed "Sweet Nothing" among their selection of the 45 best songs of 2022. The song has appeared in several rankings of Swift's discography. Rob Sheffield of Rolling Stone placed it at number 64 in his ranking of Swift's 274 songs, deeming it worthy as one of her finest love songs. Vulture's Nate Jones ranked the track 42nd among her 245 songs, highlighting the sweet vocals and cozy atmosphere that it evokes.

== Personnel ==
Credits are adapted from the liner notes of Midnights.

- Taylor Swift – vocals, songwriting, production
- William Bowery – songwriting
- Jack Antonoff – production, engineering, programming, drums, percussion, Moog, Juno 6, modular synth, Prophet 5, piano, recording
- Evan Smith – engineering, organ, saxophone, flute, clarinet
- Megan Searl – engineering assistance
- John Sher – engineering assistance
- John Rooney – engineering assistance
- Serban Ghenea – mixing
- Bryce Bordone – mixing assistance
- Randy Merrill – mastering
- Laura Sisk – engineering, recording

== Charts ==
Weekly chart performance
Chart (2022)	Peak position
Australia (ARIA)	14
Canada Hot 100 (Billboard)	15
Czech Republic Singles Digital (ČNS IFPI)	66
Global 200 (Billboard)	14
Greece International (IFPI)	30
Lithuania (AGATA)	72
Malaysia International (RIM)	16
Philippines (Billboard)	12
Portugal (AFP)	34
Singapore (RIAS)	15
Slovakia Singles Digital (ČNS IFPI)	78
Spain (Promusicae)	89
Sweden (Sverigetopplistan)	59
Swiss Streaming (Schweizer Hitparade)	70
UK Audio Streaming (OCC)	18
US Billboard Hot 100	15
Vietnam Hot 100 (Billboard)	27

== Certifications ==
Certifications for "Sweet Nothing"
Region	Certification	Certified units/sales
Australia (ARIA)	Platinum	70,000^{‡}
Brazil (Pro-Música Brasil)	Gold	20,000^{‡}
Canada (Music Canada)	Gold	40,000^{‡}
New Zealand (RMNZ)	Gold	15,000^{‡}
United Kingdom (BPI)	Silver	200,000^{‡}
^{‡} Sales+streaming figures based on certification alone.
