= Champagne Problems (Taylor Swift song) =

2020 song by Taylor Swift

Song by Taylor Swift

from the album Evermore
- Released: December 11, 2020
- Studio: Kitty Committee (Beverly Hills); Long Pond (New York)
- Length: 4:04
- Label: Republic
- Songwriters: Taylor Swift; William Bowery
- Producers: Taylor Swift; Aaron Dessner

Lyric video
- "Champagne Problems" on YouTube

"Champagne Problems" (stylized in all lowercase) is a song by the American singer-songwriter Taylor Swift from her ninth studio album, Evermore (2020). She wrote the song with Joe Alwyn, who is credited under the pseudonym William Bowery, and produced it with Aaron Dessner. "Champagne Problems" is a lo-fi tune driven by a rhythmic composition of piano and guitar riff.

Lyrically, the song is a sentimental ballad written from the perspective of a troubled girlfriend who turns down her lover's earnest marriage proposal due to her not feeling ready. The narrator takes responsibility for the breakup and mourns the faded relationship. "Champagne Problems" received critical acclaim for its portrayal of characters and their heartbreak. The song peaked within the top 25 of eight countries and the Billboard Global 200.

== Background and release ==
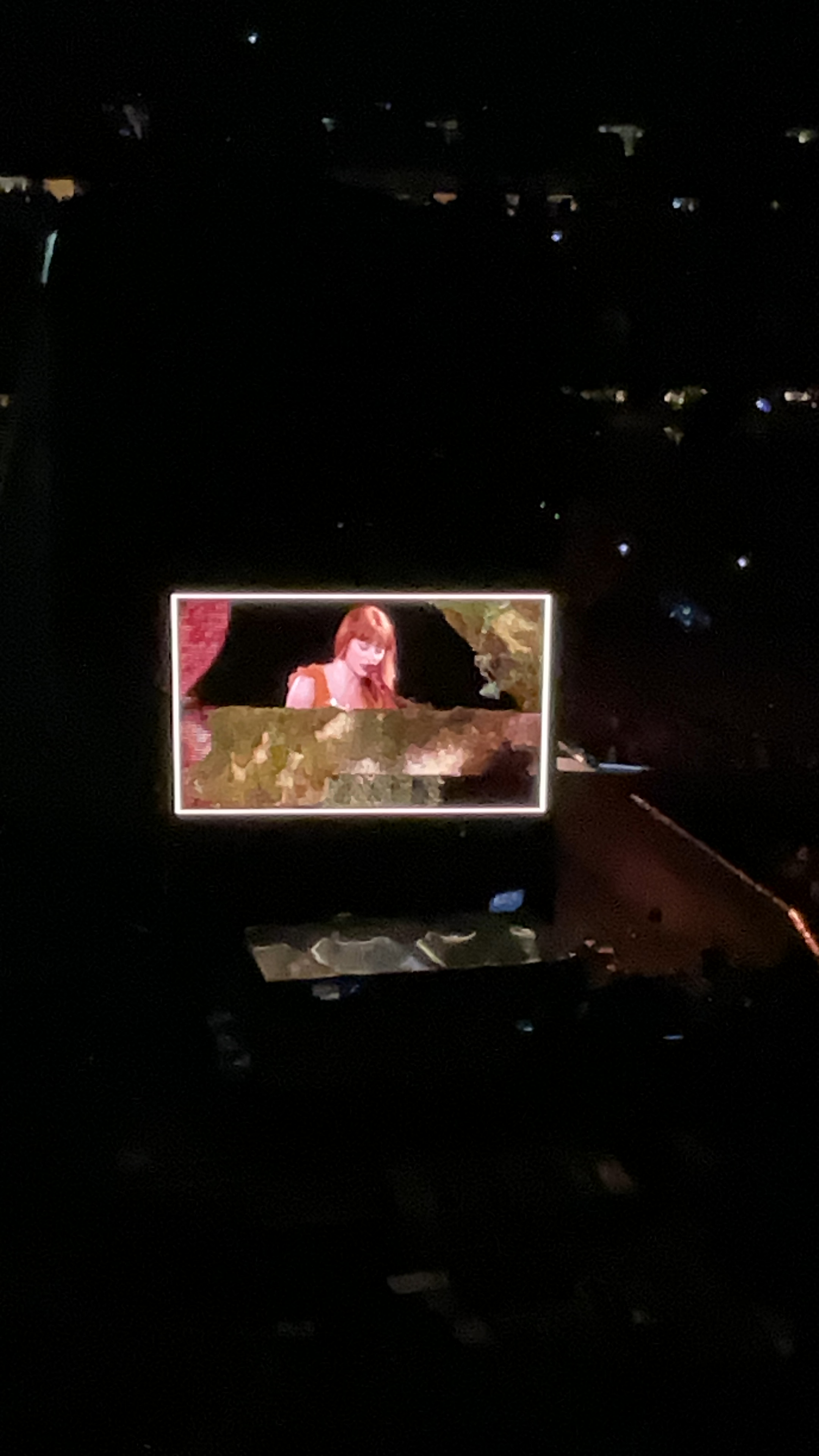
Swift performing "Champagne Problems" on the Eras Tour (2023–24)

On July 24, 2020, during the COVID-19 lockdowns, Taylor Swift surprise-released her eighth studio album, Folklore, to widespread critical acclaim and commercial success. In September 2020, Swift and her co-producers and co-writers for the album, Aaron Dessner and Jack Antonoff, assembled at Long Pond Studio, a cabin in upstate New York, to film the documentary Folklore: The Long Pond Studio Sessions. Swift wrote "Champagne Problems" during the sessions.

On December 10, 2020, Swift announced that her ninth studio album and Folklore's sister album, Evermore, would come out at midnight and revealed its track listing, where "Champagne Problems" placed second. Kitty Committee Studio was also credited as a studio in which the song was recorded. In the announcement, Swift teased imageries of various tracks, including "Champagne Problems", which she described as a song about two college sweethearts. Lyric videos of each song on the album were released to Swift's YouTube channel; "Champagne Problems" has since garnered over 42 million views as of July 2023. In the video, the lyrics appear over a glass of champagne. The song was also included in The "Dropped Your Hand While Dancing" Chapter, a streaming compilation by Swift released by Swift on January 21, 2021, featuring four other songs from Evermore and one from Folklore. The song was included in the setlist of Swift's sixth concert tour, the Eras Tour (2023–2024).

== Composition and lyrics ==
"Champagne Problems" is a ballad with lo-fi instrumentals, consisting of piano chords, guitar arpeggios, and choir vocals; the piano also possesses a stylistic oom-pah sound. Pitchfork critic Sam Sodomsky felt the song's composition is "spacious" in nature. Lyrically, the song is narrated by a girlfriend whose personal issues interfere with her romantic relationship, leading to her rejecting her lover's earnest marriage proposal, which takes place at a Christmas party. Maura Johnston of Entertainment Weekly described the song's tone as "weepy". In the second verse, she alludes to the fact that the subject was so confident the narrator would say yes that they told their family beforehand because they "couldn't keep it in". The song sees her take responsibility for the heartache caused and mourning the relationship while observing her former lover moving on. Jason Lipshutz of Billboard described the narrative as "a quiet sense of hurt growing louder as the song's story of a shriveled romance ... turns more urgent." The narrator addresses her former lover from a second-person perspective throughout the song.

== Critical reception ==
"Champagne Problems" received widespread critical acclaim. The Guardian's Alexis Petridis compared the depiction of insanity in the bridge of "Champagne Problems" to Swift's 2014 single "Blank Space", whereas Hannah Mylrea of NME felt the song is more thematically similar to Swift's 2008 single "Love Story". Music journalist Jon Pareles, in The New York Times, noted the song's "elaborate" music. Johnston, Brodie Lancaster of The Sydney Morning Herald, Tom Breihan of Stereogum, and Helen Brown of The Independent praised Swift's ability to build detailed characters in her songwriting. Johnston also cited "Champagne Problems" as an example of Swift's "pointilistic" showcase of characters in her lyrics.

Several critics, such as Patrick Ryan of USA Today, Mikael Wood of the Los Angeles Times, and Bobby Olivier of Spin, selected "Champagne Problems" as a highlight on Evermore. Annie Zaleski of The A.V. Club opined that the song demonstrates Evermore's sonic cohesion. Billboard's Jason Lipshutz and Variety's Chris Willman emphasized Swift's storytelling prowess and commended the song for showcasing it. The song received plaudits with respect to Swift's other songs as well. According to Consequence, "Champagne Problems" has the best bridge in Evermore, containing Swift's best lyrics and performance in the album. Clash critics picked it as one of Swift's 15 best songs, for its metaphor and "brutal honesty".

== Commercial performance ==
Upon the release of Evermore, all 15 tracks debuted within the top 75 of the Billboard Global 200 chart simultaneously, with "Champagne Problems" at number 12. In the United States, the song opened at number 21 on the Billboard Hot 100, and number 3 on the Hot Rock & Alternative Songs chart, where it stayed for 22 weeks. In Canada, it peaked at number 6 on the Canadian Hot 100. Elsewhere, "Champagne Problems" debuted on several single charts worldwide, peaking within the top 25 of Ireland (6), Australia (12), Malaysia (15), Singapore (16), New Zealand (24), and further reaching Portugal (75) and Switzerland (92). In the United Kingdom, the song reached number 15 on UK Singles Chart.

== In popular culture ==
Inspired by the track, French luxury hotel Royal Champagne Hotel & Spa offered guests a new package called "Champagne Solution", which includes a bottle of Dom Pérignon, the champagne brand mentioned in the song's lyrics.

== Credits and personnel ==
Credits adapted from Pitchfork.

- Taylor Swift − vocals, songwriting, production
- Aaron Dessner − production, recording, piano, synthesizer, acoustic guitar, synth bass
- William Bowery − songwriting
- Jonathan Low − vocal recording, mixing, recording
- Greg Calbi − mastering
- Steve Fallone − mastering
- Logan Coale − upright bass

== Charts ==
=== Weekly charts ===
Weekly chart performance for "Champagne Problems"
Chart (2020–2021)	Peak position
Australia (ARIA)	12
Canada Hot 100 (Billboard)	6
Ireland (IRMA)	6
Global 200 (Billboard)	12
Malaysia (RIM)	15
New Zealand (Recorded Music NZ)	24
Portugal (AFP)	75
Singapore (RIAS Streaming Chart)	16
Switzerland (Schweizer Hitparade)	92
UK Singles (Official Charts)	15
US Billboard Hot 100	21
US Hot Rock & Alternative Songs (Billboard)	3
US Rolling Stone Top 100	7

=== Year-end charts ===
Year-end chart performance for "Champagne Problems"
Chart (2021)	Position
US Hot Rock & Alternative Songs (Billboard)	23

== Certifications ==
Certifications for "Champagne Problems"
Region	Certification	Certified units/sales
Australia (ARIA)	2× Platinum	140,000^{‡}
Brazil (Pro-Música Brasil)	Platinum	40,000^{‡}
Canada (Music Canada)	Gold	40,000^{‡}
New Zealand (RMNZ)	Platinum	30,000^{‡}
Poland (ZPAV)	Gold	25,000^{‡}
Spain (Promusicae)	Gold	30,000^{‡}
United Kingdom (BPI)	Platinum	600,000^{‡}
^{‡} Sales+streaming figures based on certification alone.
