= Illicit Affairs =

2020 song by Taylor Swift

Song by Taylor Swift

from the album Folklore
- Released: July 24, 2020
- Studio: Kitty Committee (Los Angeles)
- Genre: Folk; indie rock
- Length: 3:10
- Label: Republic
- Songwriters: Taylor Swift; Jack Antonoff
- Producers: Taylor Swift; Jack Antonoff; Joe Alwyn (Note: In the liner notes of Folklore, only Swift and Antonoff are credited as producers. The Recording Academy recognized Alwyn as the track's co-producer after Folklore won Album of the Year at the 63rd Annual Grammy Awards.)

Lyric video
- "Illicit Affairs" on YouTube

"Illicit Affairs" is a song by the American singer-songwriter Taylor Swift. It is taken from her eighth studio album, Folklore, which was released on July 24, 2020. The track was written and produced by Swift and Jack Antonoff, and Joe Alwyn was credited as co-producer. "Illicit Affairs" is an acoustic guitar-led folk and indie rock love song describing an infidelity of a narrator wanting to maintain her deceitful relationship.

In reviews of Folklore, critics praised the song for what they deemed a well-written narrative about infidelity. Commercially, "Illicit Affairs" peaked at number 44 on the United States's Billboard Hot 100 and entered on the charts of Australia, Canada, Portugal, Singapore, and the United Kingdom. It received certifications from Australia and the UK. The song was featured on Folklore: The Long Pond Studio Sessions (2020), and Swift included it on the regular set list of the Eras Tour (2023–2024).

== Background and production ==
The American singer-songwriter Taylor Swift conceived her eighth studio album, Folklore (2020), as figments of mythopoeic visuals in her mind, as a result of her imagination "running wild" while isolating herself during the COVID-19 pandemic. She recruited Jack Antonoff, who had worked on her three previous studio albums, as a producer on the album. Swift wrote and produced four songs with Antonoff, including "Illicit Affairs"; the English actor Joe Alwyn was credited as co-producer on the track. It was recorded by Laura Sisk at Kitty Committee Studio in Los Angeles. The instruments were recorded at Hook and Fade and Rough Customer Studio both in Brooklyn, and Pleasure Hill Recording in Portland, Maine. The track was mixed by Serban Ghenea at Mixstar Studios in Virginia Beach, Virginia, and was mastered by Randy Merrill at Sterling Sound in New York City.

== Music and lyrics ==
"Illicit Affairs"
A sample of "Illicit Affairs", in which the narrator whispers the details of how to maintain her deceitful relationship over an acoustic guitar.

"Illicit Affairs" is a folk and indie rock love song driven by an acoustic guitar. At three minutes and ten seconds, it is the shortest track on Folklore. The production incorporates electric guitars, live drums, bass, keyboards, accordion, saxophones, pedal steel guitar, finger-picked strings, and soft horns. Swift raises her voice an octave at the end of each line. Allaire Nuss of Entertainment Weekly and Ellen Johnson of Paste thought the song veers toward indie folk; the latter opined that it was similar to the music of Justin Vernon.

As with multiple tracks on Folklore, "Illicit Affairs" is based on a fictional narrative with imagined story arcs and characters; some critics wrote that the song is about "clandestine romance". The lyrics tell a story of infidelity about a disloyal narrator who wants to continue her deceitful relationship. She describes the details of how to maintain the relationship and whispers them as if they were secrets: "Tell your friends you're out for a run/ You'll be flushed when you return". The song features themes of adultery: "Take the road less travelled by/ Tell yourself you can always stop/ What started in beautiful rooms/ Ends with meetings in parking lots". It reaches its climax in the bridge, showcasing themes of "muted regret": "Don't call me kid/ Don't call me baby [...] Look at this godforsaken mess that you made me". She eventually calms herself in the final line: "For you, I would ruin myself [...] A million little times". The song ends abruptly after its build-up, without a final chorus. Pitchfork's Jill Mapes opined that the lyrics driven by perspectives "speak volumes" of Swift's evolution as a songwriter. Rolling Stone's Angie Martoccio likened the lyrical narrative to that of Phoebe Bridgers's "Savior Complex" (2020), and thought the song "[runs] a little deeper".

== Release and live performances ==
Folklore was released on July 24, 2020, via Republic Records. In the track-list, "Illicit Affairs" sits at number 10 out of the 16 tracks. It entered on national charts in Singapore (16), Canada (33), Portugal (131). In the United States, the track peaked at number 44 on the Billboard Hot 100 and number 13 on the Rolling Stone Top 100. In Australia, it peaked at number 23 on the ARIA Singles Chart and was certified double platinum by the Australian Recording Industry Association (ARIA). In the United Kingdom, the song peaked at number 41 on the OCC's Audio Streaming Chart and received a silver certification from the British Phonographic Industry (BPI).

After the album's release, Swift recorded a stripped-down rendition of "Illicit Affairs" for the Disney+ film Folklore: The Long Pond Studio Sessions and its live album on November 25, 2020. Rolling Stone's Rob Sheffield named the recording the "definitive version" and thought it "goes so far beyond the studio original". In March 2023, Swift embarked on her sixth concert tour, the Eras Tour, as a tribute to her discography. The tour consisted of ten acts, including the Folklore set, where she sang "Illicit Affairs". Swift would chant a rock-tinged version of the song's bridge. Journalists described the performance as "powerful", "impassioned", and "vocally astounding".

== Critical reception ==
In the reviews of Folklore, critics generally discussed "Illicit Affairs" in relation to its lyrics and Swift's songwriting, with some picking it as an album highlight. (Note: Attributed to Variety's Chris Willman, i's Sarah Carson, and Beats Per Minute's John Wohlmacher) Mapes wrote that the song has the "most tender, saccharine love story" on the album, while both Martoccio and Roisin O'Connor of The Independent lauded Swift's songwriting for how well she details a dishonest relationship. Aaron Dessner, who co-wrote and produced some of Folklore's songs, labeled "Illicit Affairs" a "great" song and thought it was a demonstration of Swift's versatility and her power as a songwriter. The Los Angeles Times author Jody Rosen deemed its lyrics about infidelity more sophisticated than Swift's other songs with the same subject matter. Ilana Kaplan of British Vogue thought the song was a continuation of "Getaway Car" from her 2017 album Reputation, and Chris Willman from Variety drew comparisons between the tracks and said that it had "less catharsis [...] but just as much "pungent wisdom".

A few critics focused on other aspects of the track. Giselle Au-Nhien Nguyen from The Sydney Morning Herald said that Folklore "brings together all the threads, as well as adding new ones", which she considered "Illicit Affairs" as an example. The New York Times journalist Jon Caramanica wrote that the song's "experimentation with tonal approach succeeds". John Wohlmacher of Beats Per Minute said Swift had an "unvarnished and vulnerable" vocal performance on "Illicit Affairs", and selected it as one of the tracks that makes Folklore for him her "best album to date". Channing Freeman from Sputnikmusic was not as enthusiastic, thinking that the focus on the acoustic guitar was "encouraging", but criticized the song for ending at three minutes. In retrospective reviews, Willman listed "Illicit Affairs" at number 24 in his ranking of Swift's top 50 songs and lauded it as a "brilliantly written" song with "a whole movie's worth of insight about cheating" and American Songwriter's Alex Hopper viewed it as a fan-favorite and wrote how its lyrics about infidelity "managed to connect with a wide array of fans".

== Personnel ==
Credits are adapted from the album's liner notes, except where noted.

- Taylor Swift – lead vocals, songwriting, production
- Jack Antonoff – songwriting, production, engineering, instrument recording, bass, live drums, electric guitar, keyboard, percussion programming, background vocals
- Joe Alwyn – production
- Evan Smith – instrument recording, accordion, electric guitar, keyboard, saxophone, background vocals
- Mikey Freedom Hart – pedal steel
- Laura Sisk – recording
- John Hanes – audio engineering
- Serban Ghenea – mixing
- Randy Merrill – mastering

== Charts ==
Chart performance for "Illicit Affairs"
Chart (2020)	Peak position
Australia (ARIA)	23
Canada Hot 100 (Billboard)	33
Portugal (AFP)	131
Singapore (RIAS)	16
UK Audio Streaming (OCC)	41
US Billboard Hot 100	44
US Rolling Stone Top 100	13

== Certifications ==
Certifications for "Illicit Affairs"
Region	Certification	Certified units/sales
Australia (ARIA)	2× Platinum	140,000^{‡}
Brazil (Pro-Música Brasil)	Platinum	40,000^{‡}
New Zealand (RMNZ)	Platinum	30,000^{‡}
United Kingdom (BPI)	Gold	400,000^{‡}
^{‡} Sales+streaming figures based on certification alone.
