= This Is Me Trying =

2020 song by Taylor Swift

Song by Taylor Swift

from the album Folklore
- Released: July 24, 2020
- Studio: Kitty Committee (Beverly Hills)
- Genre: Dream pop; orchestral pop; soft rock
- Length: 3:16
- Label: Republic
- Songwriters: Taylor Swift; Jack Antonoff
- Producers: Taylor Swift; Jack Antonoff; Joe Alwyn (Note: In the liner notes of Folklore, only Swift and Antonoff are credited as producers. The Recording Academy recognized Alwyn as the track's co-producer after Folklore won Album of the Year at the 63rd Annual Grammy Awards.)

Lyric video
- "This Is Me Trying" on YouTube

"This Is Me Trying" is a song by the American singer-songwriter Taylor Swift from her eighth studio album, Folklore (2020). It was written and produced by Swift and Jack Antonoff, and Joe Alwyn was credited as co-producer. The track is a dream pop, orchestral pop, and soft rock tune with a production featuring an organ, slow-paced beats, and horns. "This Is Me Trying" was inspired by Swift's state of mind during 2016 and 2017, when she said she was at her lowest. The narrator of "This Is Me Trying" proclaims themselves as an unwanted person who struggles with existentialism and alcoholism.

Music critics generally lauded the song's production and lyrics, and some praised Swift's vocals. "This Is Me Trying" peaked at number 39 on the US Billboard Hot 100 and appeared on singles charts of Australia, Canada, Singapore, and the United Kingdom. It received a gold certification from the British Phonographic Industry (BPI). Swift recorded a stripped-down rendition for the documentary Folklore: The Long Pond Studio Sessions (2020) and performed it on her sixth concert tour, the Eras Tour (2023–2024). The track was used for the 2020 Summer Olympics.

== Background and production ==
American singer-songwriter Taylor Swift conceived her eighth studio album, Folklore (2020), as figments of mythopoeic visuals in her mind, as a result of her imagination "running wild" while isolating herself during the COVID-19 pandemic. She recruited Jack Antonoff, who had written and produced songs for Swift's three previous studio albums, as a producer on the album. They wrote and produced four songs on Folklore, including "This Is Me Trying"; the English actor Joe Alwyn was credited as co-producer on the track.

Swift wrote the lyrics "from three different characters' perspectives"; she conveyed the emotions felt in 2016 and 2017, "I just felt like I was worth absolutely nothing." (Note: Swift had suffered from tabloid gossip during the summer of 2016, when she was involved in a highly publicized feud with the rapper Kanye West and the media personality Kim Kardashian after West released the single "Famous".) The first verse regards a character who is in a life crisis and failing in a relationship, while the second verse is about one who "has a lot of potential, but has feels they have lost in life", falling into alcohol addiction and has "issues with struggling every day". On the third verse, Swift wondered how the song would turn out if it was produced by the National.

The song was recorded at Kitty Committee Studio in Beverly Hills by Laura Sisk and Antonoff. The latter also played bass, electric guitar, drums, organ, and keyboard, which were recorded at Conway Recording Studios in Los Angeles and Electric Lady Studios in New York. Evan Smith played the saxophone and additional keyboard, both instruments were recorded at Pleasure Hill Recording in Portland. Bobby Hawk and Lorenzo Wolf were in charge of the strings that were recorded at Restoration Sound in New York. John Rooney and Jon Sher worked as assistant engineers. Serban Ghenea mixed "This Is Me Trying" at MixStar Studios in Virginia Beach, with John Hanes serving as the mix engineer. It was mastered by Randy Merrill at Sterling Sound in New York.

== Composition ==
"This is Me Trying" was written from multiple perspectives. The song was inspired by Swift's state of mind in 2016–2017 when she "felt like [she] was worth absolutely nothing". It also contains themes of addiction and existential crisis. According to Swift, people around her were not aware of her trying "not to fall into old patterns"; she also said that the song touches on alcoholism. The lyrics also address "where her life is", noticed in the verse, "I got wasted like all my potential". The song documents the accountability and regret of someone who admits feeling that they are not enough. However, there are "feelings of hope and growth."

The narrator of "This Is Me Trying" embraces the perspective of "the rejected party to devastating effect". Swift tries to hide as the narrator of the track, as she gives "credence to the other person's view of her". She transmits the idea that she has a habit of needing "the last word, in public and private" and that has been her downfall. "This Is Me Trying" is a dream pop, orchestral pop, and soft rock song. Its instrumentation features a "yawning" organ, "subtle" horns, percussions, strings, and a saxophone. The track was written in the key of A major and has a moderately fast tempo of 136 beats per minute. Swift's vocal range spans between D3 to C#5. "This Is Me Trying" evolves into a "wracked orchestral grandeur". The Guardian's Laura Snapes wrote the song "[sounded] more unsettling still for how Swift's voice, processed at a ghostly, vast remove, seems to encompass the whole song with her desperation".

== Release and usage in media ==
Folklore was released on July 24, 2020, via Republic Records. In the track list, "This Is Me Trying" sits at number 9 out of the 16 tracks. The song reached the top 40 on national charts in Singapore (15), Australia (18), and Canada (30). In the United States, it entered at number 39 both on Billboard's Hot 100, Hot Rock & Alternative Songs, and on Rolling Stone Top 100, with peaks of numbers 39, 9, 14, respectively. On other charts, the track peaked at number 18 on Sweden's Heatseeker Chart and number 39 on the United Kingdom's Audio Streaming Chart. It received a silver certification from the British Phonographic Industry (BPI), for selling 200,000 units.

After the album's release, Swift recorded a stripped-down rendition of "This Is Me Trying" for the Disney+ documentary Folklore: The Long Pond Studio Sessions and its live album on November 25, 2020. In 2023, Swift embarked on her sixth concert tour, the Eras Tour, which contains a segment of "surprise songs" where she performs random songs from her discography. She performed the song twice as a full song in Glendale, Arizona (March 18, 2023) and Melbourne (February 17, 2024); and as part of a mashup twice, in Gelsenkirchen with "Labyrinth" (July 18, 2024) and Miami with "Daylight" (October 18, 2024). The track was used in a promotional video released in August 2021 celebrating American gymnast Simone Biles' return to the 2020 Summer Olympics after she withdrew from several events due to medical issues. It was featured in the seventh episode of the first season of the American television series Gossip Girl (2021).

== Critical reception ==
"This Is Me Trying" received positive reviews from most music critics. Alexandrea Lang from the Dallas Observer named "This Is Me Trying" as one of the "most profound and underrated" songs on Folklore, praising Swift's "gorgeous, breathy vocals" and the "flawless" capture of emotions of someone struggling with motivation and mental illness. Jonathan Keefe from Slant Magazine affirmed that the track "still demonstrates Swift's masterful grasp of song structure". Clash's Lucy Harbron lauded Swift's "penchant for blending the last remnants of her country roots with a more modern edge". Rolling Stone critic Rob Sheffield said that the track is "the disturbingly witty tale of someone pouring her heart out, to keep herself from pouring more whiskey." Regarding the song's metaphor set around curve and sphere, Sheffield commented: "Taylor could have invented geometry, but Euclid couldn't have written this song."

Rob Harvilla of The Ringer called the song one of the album's "most luscious and intense songs", soaked in regret, failure and booze, "as luminous as it is dolorous". He praised Swift's "sharp and specific" writing and the "gauzy lusciousness" of Antonoff's production. New Statesman critic Anna Leszkiewicz defined "This Is Me Trying" as an "expansive, atmospheric portrait" of someone opting vulnerability over "defense mechanisms" in a relationship. Despite viewing the song less favorably, Eric Mason, writing for Slant Magazine, praised Swift's vulnerability in the song, stating that she was "mining both her vulnerability and her ability to do harm" on the track.

"This Is Me Trying" was featured on a list of the best songs of 2020 by Teen Vogue. In Clash's list ranking the writer's 15 favorite Swift songs, Lucy Harbron remarked on the singer's vocals: "It's one of the first times her voice ever sounded this mature and jagged as the bridge seems to bite at your ears". In Vulture's list ranking all songs in Swift's discography, Jones wrote about "This Is Me Trying": "The climax sneaks up on you like a moment of clarity." Sheffield picked it among the best 20 songs of Swift's discography, "The easiest Folklore song to underrate, because it seems so deceptively straight-ahead."

== Credits and personnel ==
Credits are adapted from the album's liner notes, except where noted.

- Taylor Swift – vocals, songwriting, production
- Jack Antonoff – production, songwriting, live drums, percussion, programming, keyboards, bass, background vocals, organ, recording
- Joe Alwyn – production
- Evan Smith – saxophones, keyboards
- Bobby Hawk – strings
- Lorenzo Wolf – strings
- Laura Sisk – recording
- John Rooney – assistant engineering
- Jon Sher – assistant engineering
- Serban Ghenea – mixing
- John Hanes – mix engineering
- Randy Merrill – mastering

== Charts ==
Weekly chart performance for "This Is Me Trying"
Chart (2020)	Peak position
Australia (ARIA)	18
Canada Hot 100 (Billboard)	30
Portugal (AFP)	126
Singapore (RIAS)	15
Sweden Heatseekers (Sverigetopplistan)	18
UK Audio Streaming (Official Charts)	39
US Billboard Hot 100	39
US Hot Rock & Alternative Songs (Billboard)	9
US Rolling Stone Top 100	13

Year-end chart performance for "This Is Me Trying"
Chart (2020)	Position
US Hot Rock & Alternative Songs (Billboard)	40

== Certifications ==
Certification for "This Is Me Trying"
Region	Certification	Certified units/sales
Australia (ARIA)	Platinum	70,000^{‡}
Brazil (Pro-Música Brasil)	Platinum	40,000^{‡}
New Zealand (RMNZ)	Platinum	30,000^{‡}
United Kingdom (BPI)	Gold	400,000^{‡}
^{‡} Sales+streaming figures based on certification alone.
