= Marron (disambiguation) =

Marron is a name given to two closely related species of crayfish in Western Australia.

Marron may also refer to:

- Marron (surname), a Spanish surname (including a list of people with the name)
- Marron, a character in Dragon Ball manga series
- Marron Curtis Fort (1938–2019), American-born German linguist and professor
- Marron, chestnut fruit
  - Marron glacé, a candied chestnut
- Marron River, British Columbia, Canada
- River Marron, Cumbria, England, United Kingdom
- Le Marron, a former restaurant in Malden, Netherlands
- Marron, the French word for maroon
  - Marrons, the French word for maroons

== See also ==
- Maron (disambiguation)
- Maroon (disambiguation)
