= Jack Antonoff production discography =

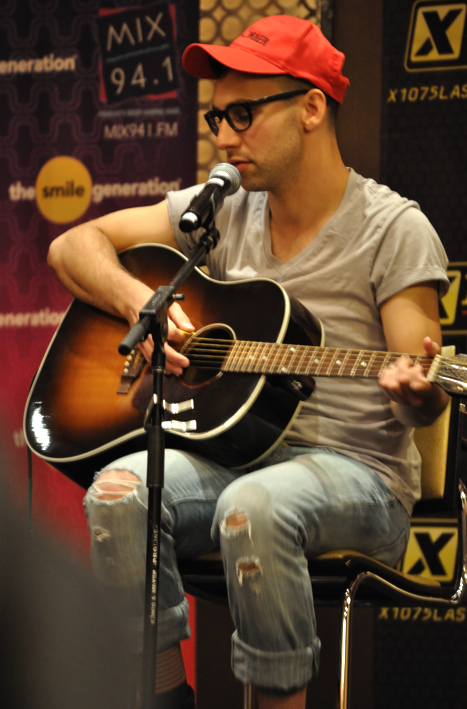
Antonoff in 2012

American record producer and songwriter Jack Antonoff has released five studio albums and one soundtrack under the solo project Bleachers, and 11 studio albums, collectively, among his bands: Red Hearse, fun., Steel Train, and Outline. He has also served as the co-writer or co-producer on albums by Taylor Swift, The 1975, Kendrick Lamar, Florence + the Machine, Lorde, Phoebe Bridgers, Kevin Abstract, Troye Sivan, Sabrina Carpenter, Clairo, Doja Cat, The Chicks, Lana Del Rey, Kelsey Lu, Anne Hathaway, and St. Vincent. He has also written and produced individual tracks with artists including Pink, FKA Twigs, Charli xcx, Paramore, Sara Bareilles, Rachel Zegler, Margaret Qualley, Maren Morris, Carly Rae Jepsen, Diana Ross, Gracie Abrams, and Sia, among others.

== Production and writing credits ==
Key
‡	Indicates songs solely written or produced by Jack Antonoff

=== 2000s ===
Year	Artist	Song	Album	Written with	Produced with	U.S.peak position	U.K.peak position
2003	Steel Train	"Blown Away"	For You My Dear	Sole writing ‡	John Naclerio, Steel Train	—	—
2003	Steel Train	"Alley Cat"	For You My Dear	Sole writing ‡	John Naclerio, Steel Train	—	—
2003	Steel Train	"Angelica"	For You My Dear	Sole writing ‡	John Naclerio, Steel Train	—	—
2003	Steel Train	"W. 12th"	For You My Dear	Sole writing ‡	John Naclerio, Steel Train	—	—
2003	Steel Train	"For You My Dear"	For You My Dear	Sole writing ‡	John Naclerio, Steel Train	—	—
2003	Steel Train	"Night Falls"	For You My Dear	Sole writing ‡	John Naclerio, Steel Train	—	—
2005	Steel Train	"Better Love"	Twilight Tales From the Prairies of the Sun	Sole writing ‡	—	—	—
2005	Steel Train	"Road Song"	Twilight Tales From the Prairies of the Sun	Evan Winiker, Matthew Goldman	—	—	—
2005	Steel Train	"Dig"	Twilight Tales From the Prairies of the Sun	Sole writing ‡	—	—	—
2005	Steel Train	"The Lee Baby Simms Show: Episode 1"	Twilight Tales From the Prairies of the Sun	Evan Winiker, Matthew Goldman, Matthias Gruber, Scott Irby-Ranniar	—	—	—
2005	Steel Train	"Wake Your Eyes"	Twilight Tales From the Prairies of the Sun	Evan Winiker, Matthew Goldman	—	—	—
2005	Steel Train	"Two O'Clock"	Twilight Tales From the Prairies of the Sun	Sole writing ‡	—	—	—
2005	Steel Train	"Grace"	Twilight Tales From the Prairies of the Sun	Sole writing ‡	—	—	—
2005	Steel Train	"Catch You On the Other Side"	Twilight Tales From the Prairies of the Sun	Sole writing ‡	—	—	—
2005	Steel Train	"Gypsy Waves"	Twilight Tales From the Prairies of the Sun	Evan Winiker, Matthew Goldman, Matthias Gruber	—	—	—
2005	Steel Train	"Tickle Your Toes"	Twilight Tales From the Prairies of the Sun	Evan Winiker, Matthew Goldman, Matthias Gruber	—	—	—
2005	Steel Train	"The Lee Baby Simms Show: Episode 2"	Twilight Tales From the Prairies of the Sun	Evan Winiker, Matthew Goldman, Matthias Gruber, Scott Irby-Ranniar	—	—	—
2005	Steel Train	"Blue"	Twilight Tales From the Prairies of the Sun	Sole writing ‡	—	—	—
2005	Steel Train	"Cellophane and Glass"	Twilight Tales From the Prairies of the Sun	Sole writing ‡	—	—	—
2005	Steel Train	"W.95th Street High"	Twilight Tales From the Prairies of the Sun	Evan Winiker, Matthew Goldman, Matthias Gruber, Scott Irby-Ranniar	—	—	—
2005	Steel Train	"I Will Stay Here"	Twilight Tales From the Prairies of the Sun	Sole writing ‡	—	—	—
2007	Steel Train	"I Feel Weird"	Trampoline	Sole writing ‡	—	—	—
2007	Steel Train	"Black Eye"	Trampoline	Sole writing ‡	—	—	—
2007	Steel Train	"Kill Monsters in the Rain"	Trampoline	Sole writing ‡	—	—	—
2007	Steel Train	"Dakota"	Trampoline	Sole writing ‡	—	—	—
2007	Steel Train	"Alone on the Sea"	Trampoline	Sole writing ‡	—	—	—
2007	Steel Train	"Firecracker"	Trampoline	Sole writing ‡	—	—	—
2007	Steel Train	"A Magazine"	Trampoline	Sole writing ‡	—	—	—
2007	Steel Train	"Diamonds in the Sky"	Trampoline	Sole writing ‡	—	—	—
2007	Steel Train	"Leave You Traveling"	Trampoline	Sole writing ‡	—	—	—
2007	Steel Train	"I've Let You Go"	Trampoline	Sole writing ‡	—	—	—
2007	Steel Train	"School is for Losers"	Trampoline	Sole writing ‡	—	—	—
2007	Steel Train	"Women I Belong To"	Trampoline	Sole writing ‡	—	—	—
2009	fun.	"Be Calm"	Aim and Ignite	Nate Ruess, Andrew Dost, Sam Means	—	—	—
2009	fun.	"Benson Hedges"	Aim and Ignite	Nate Ruess, Andrew Dost, Sam Means	—	—	—
2009	fun.	"All the Pretty Girls"	Aim and Ignite	Nate Ruess, Andrew Dost, Sam Means	—	—	—
2009	fun.	"I Wanna Be the One"	Aim and Ignite	Nate Ruess, Andrew Dost, Sam Means	—	—	—
2009	fun.	"At Least I'm Not as Sad (As I Used to Be)"	Aim and Ignite	Nate Ruess, Andrew Dost, Sam Means	—	—	—
2009	fun.	"Light a Roman Candle With Me"	Aim and Ignite	Nate Ruess, Andrew Dost, Sam Means	—	—	—
2009	fun.	"Walking the Dog"	Aim and Ignite	Nate Ruess, Andrew Dost, Sam Means	—	—	—
2009	fun.	"Barlights"	Aim and Ignite	Nate Ruess, Andrew Dost, Sam Means	—	—	—
2009	fun.	"The Gambler"	Aim and Ignite	Nate Ruess, Andrew Dost, Sam Means	—	—	—
2009	fun.	"Take Your Time (Coming Home)"	Aim and Ignite	Nate Ruess, Andrew Dost, Sam Means	—	—	—
2009	fun.	"Stitch Me Up"	Aim and Ignite	Nate Ruess, Andrew Dost	—	—	—
2009	fun.	"Walking the Dog II"	Aim and Ignite	Nate Ruess, Andrew Dost, Sam Means	—	—	—
2009	fun.	"Jumping the Shark"	Unreleased	Nate Ruess, Andrew Dost, Sam Means	—	—	—

=== 2010s ===
Year	Artist	Song	Album	Written with	Produced with	U.S.peak position	U.K.peak position
2010	Steel Train	"Bullet"	Steel Train	Sole writing ‡	—	—	
2010	Steel Train	"Turnpike Ghost"	Steel Train	Sole writing ‡	—	—	
2010	Steel Train	"You and I Undercover"	Steel Train	Sole writing ‡	—	—	
2010	Steel Train	"You Are Dangerous"	Steel Train	Sole writing ‡	—	—	
2010	Steel Train	"S.O.G. Burning in Hell"	Steel Train	Sole writing ‡	—	—	
2010	Steel Train	"Touch Me Bad"	Steel Train	Sole writing ‡	—	—	
2010	Steel Train	"Behavior"	Steel Train	Sole writing ‡	—	—	
2010	Steel Train	"Children of the 90's (I'm Not the Same)"	Steel Train	Sole writing ‡	—	—	
2010	Steel Train	"Soldier in the Army"	Steel Train	Sole writing ‡	—	—	
2010	Steel Train	"Bloody Lips"	Steel Train	Sole writing ‡	—	—	
2010	Steel Train	"The Speedway Motor Racers Club"	Steel Train	Sole writing ‡	—	—	
2010	Steel Train	"Fall Asleep"	Steel Train	Sole writing ‡	—	—	
2011	Steel Train	"Shapeshifter (Bonus Track)"	Steel Train	Sole writing ‡	—	—	
2011	Steel Train	"Terrible Thrills (Bonus Track)"	Steel Train	Sole writing ‡	Justin Huey	—	—
2011	Panic! At The Disco	"C'mon" (featuring fun.)	Non-album single	Andrew Dost, Nate Ruess, Spencer Smith & Brendon Urie	—	—	—
2011	fun.	"We Are Young" (featuring Janelle Monáe)	Some Nights	Nate Ruess, Andrew Dost, Jeff Bhasker	–	1	1
2012	fun.	"Some Nights (Intro)"	Some Nights	Nate Ruess, Andrew Dost, Jeff Bhasker	–	—	—
2012	fun.	"Some Nights"	Some Nights	Nate Ruess, Andrew Dost, Jeff Bhasker	–	3	7
2012	fun.	"Carry On"	Some Nights	Nate Ruess, Andrew Dost, Jeff Bhasker	–	20	126
2012	fun.	"It Gets Better"	Some Nights	Nate Ruess, Andrew Dost, Jeff Bhasker	–	—	—
2012	fun.	"Why Am I the One"	Some Nights	Nate Ruess, Andrew Dost, Jeff Bhasker	–	—	169
2012	fun.	"All Alone"	Some Nights	Nate Ruess, Andrew Dost, Jeff Bhasker	–	—	—
2012	fun.	"All Alright"	Some Nights	Nate Ruess, Andrew Dost, Jeff Bhasker, N. Cobey, Jake One, Emile Haynie	–	—	—
2012	fun.	"One Foot"	Some Nights	Nate Ruess, Andrew Dost, Emile Haynie	–	—	—
2012	fun.	"Stars"	Some Nights	Nate Ruess, Andrew Dost, Jeff Bhasker	–	—	—
2012	fun.	"Out On the Town"	Some Nights	Nate Ruess, Andrew Dost, Emile Haynie	–	—	—
2012	Carly Rae Jepsen	"Sweetie"	Kiss	Carly Rae Jepsen, Sara Quin, Klas Åhlund	—	—	—
2013	Tegan and Sara	"How Come You Don't Want Me"	Heartthrob	Sara Quin, Tegan Quin	—	—	—
2013	Emblem3	"Spaghetti"	Nothing to Lose	Drew Chadwick, Savan Kotecha, Keaton Stromberg, Wesley Stromberg	—	—	—
2013	Sara Bareilles	"Brave"	The Blessed Unrest	Sara Bareilles	–	23	48
2013	Sara Bareilles	"Chasing the Sun"	The Blessed Unrest	Sara Bareilles	–	—	—
2013	Taylor Swift	"Sweeter Than Fiction"	One Chance: The Incredible True Story of Paul Potts: Motion Picture Soundtrack	Taylor Swift	Taylor Swift	34	45
2014	Christina Perri	"I Don't Wanna Break"	Head or Heart	Christina Perri	John Hill	—	—
2014	fun.	"Sight of the Sun"	Non-album single	Nate Ruess, Andrew Dost	Andrew Dost, Kevin Weaver, Manish Raval, Tom Wolfe	—	—
2014	Bleachers	"Wild Heart"	Strange Desire	John Hill	John Hill, Vince Clarke(add.)	—	—
2014	Bleachers	"Rollercoaster"	Strange Desire	John Hill	Greg Kurstin	—	—
2014	Bleachers	"Shadow"	Strange Desire	John Hill, Emile Haynie	John Hill	—	—
2014	Bleachers	"I Wanna Get Better"	Strange Desire	John Hill	John Hill	—	—
2014	Bleachers	"Wake Me"	Strange Desire	John Hill, Patrik Berger	John Hill	—	—
2014	Bleachers	"Reckless Love"	Strange Desire	John Hill	John Hill	—	—
2014	Bleachers	"Take Me Away" (featuring Grimes)	Strange Desire	John Hill, Claire Boucher	John Hill	—	—
2014	Bleachers	"Like a River Runs"	Strange Desire	John Hill	John Hill, Vince Clarke(add.)	—	—
2014	Bleachers	"You're Still a Mystery"	Strange Desire	John Hill	John Hill	—	—
2014	Bleachers	"I'm Ready to Move On / Wild Heart Reprise" (featuring Yoko Ono)	Strange Desire	John Hill, Yoko Ono	John Hill, Vince Clarke(add.)	—	—
2014	Bleachers	"Who I Want You to Love"	Strange Desire	John Hill, Emile Haynie	John Hill	—	—
2014	Taylor Swift	"Out of the Woods"	1989	Taylor Swift	Taylor Swift	18	136
2014	Taylor Swift	"I Wish You Would"	1989	Taylor Swift	Taylor Swift	—	—
2014	Taylor Swift	"You Are in Love"	1989	Taylor Swift	Taylor Swift	83	—
2015	Grimes, Bleachers	"Entropy"	Girls, Volume 3 (soundtrack)	Claire Boucher	Claire Boucher	—	—
2015	Andrew Dost, Jack Antonoff, Rob Kroehler, Andy McCluskey	"A Million Stars"	The D Train (Original Motion Picture Soundtrack)	Andrew Dost, Rob Kroehler, Andy McCluskey	Andrew Dost, Rob Kroehler, Andy McCluskey	—	—
2015	Nate Ruess	"AhHa"	Grand Romantic	Nate Ruess, Andrew Dost, Jeff Bhasker, Emile Haynie, Josh Klinghoffer	—	—	—
2015	Nate Ruess	"Harsh Light"	Grand Romantic	Nate Ruess, Andrew Dost, Jeff Bhasker, Nathan Edward Harold	—	—	—
2015	Troye Sivan	"Heaven" (featuring Betty Who)	Blue Neighbourhood	Troye Sivan, Alex Hope, Claire Boucher	Sole production ‡	—	—
2015	Rachel Platten	"Stand by You"	Wildfire	Rachel Platten, Joy Williams, Matthew Morris	—	37	115
2016	St. Lucia	"Help Me Run Away"	Matter	Jean-Philip Grobler	Jean-Philip Grobler, Chris Zane	—	—
2016	Sia	"House on Fire"	This Is Acting	Sia Furler	Jesse Shatkin, Jake Sinclair (add.)	—	—
2016	Brooke Candy	"Changes"	Non-album single	Brooke Candy, Jesse St. John	Sole production ‡	—	—
2016	Fifth Harmony	"Dope"	7/27	Julia Michaels, Justin Tranter	Sole production ‡	—	—
2016	How to Dress Well	"Lost Youth/Lost You"	Care	—	Tom Krell	—	—
2016	Zayn, Taylor Swift	"I Don't Wanna Live Forever"	Fifty Shades Darker: Original Motion Picture Soundtrack	Taylor Swift, Sam Dew	Sole production ‡	2	5
2017	Bleachers	"Dream of Mickey Mantle"	Gone Now	Tom Krell	Sole production ‡	—	—
2017	Bleachers	"Goodmorning"	Gone Now	Emile Haynie	Emile Haynie(co.), Organized Noize(add.)	—	—
2017	Bleachers	"Hate That You Know Me"	Gone Now	Julia Michaels	Greg Kurstin(co.)	—	—
2017	Bleachers	"Don't Take the Money"	Gone Now	Ella Yelich-O'Connor	Greg Kurstin(co.), Vince Clarke(add.)	—	—
2017	Bleachers	"Everybody Lost Somebody"	Gone Now	Evan Smith	Emile Haynie(add.)	—	—
2017	Bleachers	"All My Heroes"	Gone Now	Sole writing ‡	Sole production ‡	—	—
2017	Bleachers	"Let's Get Married"	Gone Now	Evan Smith, Paul Jefferies	Paul Jefferies	—	—
2017	Bleachers	"Goodbye"	Gone Now	Sole writing ‡	Sounwave(add.), John Hill(add.)	—	—
2017	Bleachers	"Nothing Is U"	Gone Now	Sole writing ‡	Sole production ‡	—	—
2017	Bleachers	"I Miss Those Days"	Gone Now	Sole writing ‡	Greg Kurstin(add.)	—	—
2017	Bleachers	"I'm Ready to Move On / Mickey Mantle Reprise"	Gone Now	Sam Dew, Sam Dew	Organized Noize(add.)	—	—
2017	Bleachers	"Foreign Girls"	Gone Now	Sole writing ‡	Sounwave(add.)	—	—
2017	Lorde	"Green Light"	Melodrama	Ella Yelich-O'Connor, Joel Little	Lorde, Frank Dukes, Kuk Harrell(add.)	19	20
2017	Lorde	"Sober"	Melodrama	Ella Yelich-O'Connor	Lorde, Malay	—	—
2017	Lorde	"The Louvre"	Melodrama	Ella Yelich-O'Connor	Lorde, Flume(add.)	—	—
2017	Lorde	"Liability"	Melodrama	Ella Yelich-O'Connor	Lorde	78	84
2017	Lorde	"Hard Feelings/Loveless"	Melodrama	Ella Yelich-O'Connor	Lorde, Frank Dukes(add.)	—	—
2017	Lorde	"Sober II (Melodrama)"	Melodrama	Ella Yelich-O'Connor	Lorde, Frank Dukes, S1	—	—
2017	Lorde	"Writer in the Dark"	Melodrama	Ella Yelich-O'Connor	Lorde	—	—
2017	Lorde	"Supercut"	Melodrama	Ella Yelich-O'Connor	Lorde, Joel Little, Frank Dukes(add.), Jean-Benoît Dunckel(add.), Malay(add.)	—	—
2017	Lorde	"Liability (Reprise)"	Melodrama	Ella Yelich-O'Connor	Lorde	—	—
2017	Lorde	"Perfect Places"	Melodrama	Ella Yelich-O'Connor	Lorde, Andrew Wyatt, Frank Dukes(add.)	—	95
2017	Banks	"Crowded Places"	Non-album single	Jillian Banks, Tim Anderson	Sole production ‡	—	—
2017	St. Vincent	"Hang On Me"	Masseduction	—	Annie Clark	—	—
2017	St. Vincent	"Pills"	Masseduction	Sounwave, Annie Clark	Annie Clark, John Congleton	—	—
2017	St. Vincent	"Masseduction"	Masseduction	Annie Clark	Annie Clark, Lars Stalfors	—	—
2017	St. Vincent	"Sugarboy"	Masseduction	Annie Clark	Annie Clark	—	—
2017	St. Vincent	"Los Ageless"	Masseduction	—	Annie Clark	—	—
2017	St. Vincent	"Happy Birthday, Johnny"	Masseduction	Annie Clark	Annie Clark	—	—
2017	St. Vincent	"Savior"	Masseduction	—	Annie Clark, John Congleton	—	—
2017	St. Vincent	"New York"	Masseduction	Annie Clark	Annie Clark	—	—
2017	St. Vincent	"Fear The Future"	Masseduction	—	Annie Clark, John Congleton	—	—
2017	St. Vincent	"Young Lover"	Masseduction	—	Annie Clark, Lars Stalfors	—	—
2017	St. Vincent	"Dancing With a Ghost"	Masseduction	—	Annie Clark	—	—
2017	St. Vincent	"Slow Disco"	Masseduction	—	Annie Clark	—	—
2017	St. Vincent	"Smoking Section	Masseduction	—	Annie Clark	—	—
2017	St. Vincent	"政権腐敗 (Power Corrupts)"	Masseduction (Japanese Edition)	—	Annie Clark	—	—
2017	Taylor Swift	"Look What You Made Me Do"	Reputation	Taylor Swift, Richard Fairbrass, Fred Fairbrass, Rob Manzoli	Taylor Swift	1	1
2017	Taylor Swift	"Getaway Car"	Reputation	Taylor Swift	Taylor Swift	—	—
2017	Taylor Swift	"Dress"	Reputation	Taylor Swift	Taylor Swift	—	—
2017	Taylor Swift	"This Is Why We Can't Have Nice Things"	Reputation	Taylor Swift	Taylor Swift	—	—
2017	Taylor Swift	"Call It What You Want"	Reputation	Taylor Swift	Taylor Swift	27	29
2017	Taylor Swift	"New Year's Day"	Reputation	Taylor Swift	Taylor Swift	—	—
2017	Pink	"Beautiful Trauma"	Beautiful Trauma	Alecia Moore	Sole production ‡	78	25
2017	Pink	"Better Life"	Beautiful Trauma	Alecia Moore, Sam Dew	Sole production ‡	—	—
2018	Bleachers	"Alfie's Song (Not So Typical Love Song)"	Love, Simon (Original Motion Picture Soundtrack)	Ilsey Juber, Harry Styles	Sole production ‡	—	—
2018	Bleachers	"Keeping a Secret"	Love, Simon (Original Motion Picture Soundtrack)	Justin Tranter	Sole production ‡	—	—
2018	Jack Antonoff, MØ	"Never Fall In Love"	Love, Simon (Original Motion Picture Soundtrack)	Karen Marie Ørsted	Sole production ‡	—	—
2018	Troye Sivan	"Strawberries & Cigarettes"	Love, Simon (Original Motion Picture Soundtrack)	Troye Sivan, Alex Hope	Sole production ‡	—	—
2018	Amy Shark	"Sink In"	Love, Simon (Original Motion Picture Soundtrack)	Ryan McMahon, Ben Berger, Julia Michaels, Ryan Rabin	Sole production ‡	—	—
2018	Amy Shark	"All Loved Up"	Love Monster	Amy Billings	Sole production ‡	—	—
2018	Lana Del Rey	"Mariners Apartment Complex"	Norman Fucking Rockwell!	Lana Del Rey	Lana Del Rey	—	79
2018	Lana Del Rey	"Venice Bitch"	Norman Fucking Rockwell!	Lana Del Rey	Lana Del Rey	—	80
2019	Lana Del Rey	"hope is a dangerous thing for a woman like me to have - but i have it"	Norman Fucking Rockwell!	Lana Del Rey	Lana Del Rey	—	99
2019	Lana Del Rey	"How To Disappear"	Norman Fucking Rockwell!	Lana Del Rey	Lana Del Rey	—	—
2019	Lana Del Rey	"Norman Fucking Rockwell"	Norman Fucking Rockwell!	Lana Del Rey	Lana Del Rey	—	44
2019	Lana Del Rey	"Fuck It, I Love You"	Norman Fucking Rockwell!	Lana Del Rey	Lana Del Rey	119	59
2019	Lana Del Rey	"Love Song"	Norman Fucking Rockwell!	Lana Del Rey	Lana Del Rey	—	—
2019	Lana Del Rey	"Cinnamon Girl"	Norman Fucking Rockwell!	Lana Del Rey	Lana Del Rey	—	—
2019	Lana Del Rey	"The Greatest"	Norman Fucking Rockwell!	Lana Del Rey	Lana Del Rey	—	—
2019	Lana Del Rey	"California"	Norman Fucking Rockwell!	Lana Del Rey, Zachary Dawes	Lana Del Rey, Zachary Dawes	—	—
2019	Lana Del Rey	"Happiness Is a Butterfly"	Norman Fucking Rockwell!	Lana Del Rey, Rick Nowels	Lana Del Rey, Rick Nowels (add.)	—	—
2019	Lana Del Rey	"Looking for America"	Non-album single	Lana Del Rey	Lana Del Rey	—	—
2019	Lana Del Rey	"Season of the Witch"	Non-album single	—	Lana Del Rey	—	—
2019	Carly Rae Jepsen	"Want You in My Room"	Dedicated	Carly Rae Jepsen, Tavish Crowe	Sole production ‡	—	—
2019	Elle Fanning	"Wildflowers"	Teen Spirit (Original Motion Picture Soundtrack)	Carly Rae Jepsen, Tavish Crowe	Sole production ‡	—	—
2019	Kevin Abstract	"Big Wheels"	Arizona Baby	Ian Simpson, Romil Hemnani	Kevin Abstract, Romil Hamnani	—	—
2019	Kevin Abstract	"Joyride"	Arizona Baby	Ian Simpson, Romil Hamnani, Evan Smith	Romil Hamnani	—	—
2019	Kevin Abstract	"Georgia"	Arizona Baby	Ian Simpson, Romil Hamnani	Romil Hamnani	—	—
2019	Kevin Abstract	"Corpus Christi"	Arizona Baby	Ian Simpson, Romil Hamnani	Romil Hamnani	—	—
2019	Kevin Abstract	"Baby Boy"	Arizona Baby	Ian Simpson, Romil Hamnani, Ryan Beatty, Austin Anderson, Kenneth B. Edmonds, Khris Riddick-Tynes	Romil Hamnani	—	—
2019	Kevin Abstract	"Mississippi"	Arizona Baby	Ian Simpson, Romil Hamnani	Romil Hamnani	—	—
2019	Kevin Abstract	"Use Me"	Arizona Baby	Ian Simpson, Romil Hamnani, A. Jeffrey LaValley	Romil Hamnani	—	—
2019	Kevin Abstract	"Peach"	Arizona Baby	Ian Simpson, Romil Hamnani, Dominic Fike, Jabari Manwarring, Russell Boring, Ciarán McDonald	Romil Hamnani, Jabari Manwa	—	—
2019	Kevin Abstract	"American Problem"	Arizona Baby	Ian Simpson, Romil Hamnani, Abhirath Raju	Romil Hamnani	—	—
2019	Kevin Abstract	"Crumble"	Arizona Baby	Ian Simpson, Romil Hamnani, Dominic Fike, Ryan Beatty, Russell Boring	Romil Hamnani	—	—
2019	Jack Antonoff	"Me and Julio Down By the Schoolyard" (cover of the Paul Simon song)	The Secret Life of Pets 2 (Original Motion Picture Soundtrack)	—	Sole production ‡	—	—
2019	Red Hearse	"Half Love"	Red Hearse	Sounwave, Sam Dew	Sounwave, Sam Dew	—	—
2019	Red Hearse	"Violence"	Red Hearse	Sounwave, Sam Dew	Sounwave, Sam Dew	—	—
2019	Red Hearse	"Red Hearse"	Red Hearse	Sounwave, Sam Dew	Sounwave, Sam Dew	—	—
2019	Red Hearse	"You Make It Easy"	Red Hearse	Sounwave, Sam Dew	Sounwave, Sam Dew	—	—
2019	Red Hearse	"Honey"	Red Hearse	Sounwave, Sam Dew	Sounwave, Sam Dew	—	—
2019	Red Hearse	"Everybody Wants You"	Red Hearse	Sounwave, Sam Dew	Sounwave, Sam Dew	—	—
2019	Red Hearse	"Born to Bleed"	Red Hearse	Sounwave, Sam Dew	Sounwave, Sam Dew	—	—
2019	Red Hearse	"Blessin' Me"	Red Hearse	Sounwave, Sam Dew	Sounwave, Sam Dew	—	—
2019	Taylor Swift	"Cruel Summer"	Lover	Taylor Swift, Annie Clark	Taylor Swift	1	2
2019	Taylor Swift	"Lover"	Lover	—	Taylor Swift	10	14
2019	Taylor Swift	"The Archer"	Lover	Taylor Swift	Taylor Swift	38	43
2019	Taylor Swift	"I Think He Knows"	Lover	Taylor Swift	Taylor Swift	51	—
2019	Taylor Swift	"Paper Rings"	Lover	Taylor Swift	Taylor Swift	45	—
2019	Taylor Swift	"Cornelia Street"	Lover	—	Taylor Swift	57	—
2019	Taylor Swift	"Death By a Thousand Cuts"	Lover	Taylor Swift	Taylor Swift	67	—
2019	Taylor Swift	"London Boy"	Lover	Taylor Swift, Cautious Clay, Sounwave	Taylor Swift, Sounwave (co.)	62	—
2019	Taylor Swift	"Soon You'll Get Better" (featuring The Chicks)	Lover	Taylor Swift	Taylor Swift	63	—
2019	Taylor Swift	"False God"	Lover	Taylor Swift	Taylor Swift	77	—
2019	Taylor Swift	"Daylight"	Lover	—	Taylor Swift	89	—
2019	Taylor Swift	"Lover (Remix)" (featuring Shawn Mendes)	Non-album single	—	Taylor Swift	—	—
2019	FKA Twigs	"Holy Terrain" (featuring Future)	Magdalene	FKA Twigs, Nayvadius Wilburn, Lewis Roberts, Sounwave, Skrillex, Jason Boyd, Petar Lyondev	FKA Twigs, Skrillex, Sounwave, Koreless, Kenny Beats	—	—

=== 2020s ===
Year	Artist	Song	Album	Written with	Produced with	U.S.peak position	U.K.peak position
2020	The Chicks	"Gaslighter"	Gaslighter	Martie Maguire, Natalie Maines, Emily Strayer	The Chicks	107	—
2020	The Chicks	"Sleep at Night"	Gaslighter	—	Teddy Geiger, The Chicks	—	—
2020	The Chicks	"Texas Man"	Gaslighter	Martie Maguire, Natalie Maines, Emily Strayer, Teddy Geiger, Julia Michaels, Justin Tranter	The Chicks	—	—
2020	The Chicks	"Everybody Loves You"	Gaslighter	—	The Chicks	—	—
2020	The Chicks	"For Her"	Gaslighter	—	The Chicks	—	—
2020	The Chicks	"March March"	Gaslighter	Martie Maguire, Natalie Maines, Emily Strayer, Ross Golan, Ian Kirkpatrick, Daniel Dodd Wilson	The Chicks	—	—
2020	The Chicks	"My Best Friend's Weddings"	Gaslighter	Martie Maguire, Natalie Maines, Emily Strayer, Justin Tranter	The Chicks	—	—
2020	The Chicks	"Tights on My Boat"	Gaslighter	Martie Maguire, Natalie Maines, Emily Strayer, Julia Michaels	The Chicks	—	—
2020	The Chicks	"Julianna Calm Down"	Gaslighter	Natalie Maines, Julia Michaels	The Chicks	—	—
2020	The Chicks	"Young Man"	Gaslighter	Martie Maguire, Natalie Maines, Emily Strayer, Annie Clark, Justin Tranter	The Chicks	—	—
2020	The Chicks	"Hope It's Something Good"	Gaslighter	Martie Maguire, Natalie Maines, Emily Strayer	The Chicks	—	—
2020	The Chicks	"Set Me Free"	Gaslighter	Martie Maguire, Natalie Maines, Emily Strayer, Ben Abraham	The Chicks	—	—
2020	Sia	"Together"	Music – Songs from and Inspired by the Motion Picture	Sia Furler	Jesse Shatkin (add.)	—	96
2020	Carly Rae Jepsen	"This Love Isn't Crazy"	Dedicated Side B	Carly Rae Jepsen	Sole production ‡	—	—
2020	Carly Rae Jepsen	"Comeback" (featuring Bleachers)	Dedicated Side B	Carly Rae Jepsen, Jared Manierka	Sole production ‡	—	—
2020	Carly Rae Jepsen	"Me and the Boys in the Band"	Non-album single	Carly Rae Jepsen, Tavish Crowe	Sole production ‡	—	—
2020	Taylor Swift	"My Tears Ricochet"	Folklore	—	Taylor Swift	16	—
2020	Taylor Swift	"Mirrorball"	Folklore	Taylor Swift	Taylor Swift	26	—
2020	Taylor Swift	"August"	Folklore	Taylor Swift	Taylor Swift	23	78
2020	Taylor Swift	"This Is Me Trying"	Folklore	Taylor Swift	Taylor Swift	39	—
2020	Taylor Swift	"Illicit Affairs"	Folklore	Taylor Swift	Taylor Swift	44	—
2020	Taylor Swift	"Betty"	Folklore	—	Taylor Swift, Aaron Dessner	42	—
2020	Taylor Swift	"The Lakes"	Folklore	Taylor Swift	Taylor Swift	118	—
2020	Taylor Swift	"Gold Rush"	Evermore	Taylor Swift	Taylor Swift	40	—
2020	Taylor Swift	"Ivy"	Evermore	Taylor Swift, Aaron Dessner	—	61	—
2020	Cam	"Classic"	The Otherside	Camaron Ochs	Sole production ‡	—	—
2020	Sara Bareilles	"More Love"	More Love - Songs from Little Voice Season One	Sara Bareilles	—	—	—
2020	Bleachers	"Chinatown" (featuring Bruce Springsteen)	Take the Sadness Out of Saturday Night	Evan Smith	Patrik Berger	—	—
2020	Bleachers	"45"	Take the Sadness Out of Saturday Night	Sole writing ‡	Patrik Berger	—	—
2021	Bleachers	"Stop Making This Hurt"	Take the Sadness Out of Saturday Night	Patrik Berger	Patrik Berger	—	—
2021	Bleachers	"91"	Take the Sadness Out of Saturday Night	Zadie Smith	Patrik Berger, Annie Clark	—	—
2021	Bleachers	"How Dare You Want More"	Take the Sadness Out of Saturday Night	Patrik Berger	Patrik Berger	—	—
2021	Bleachers	"Secret Life"	Take the Sadness Out of Saturday Night	Patrik Berger	Patrik Berger	—	—
2021	Bleachers	"What'd I Do with All This Faith?"	Take the Sadness Out of Saturday Night	Patrik Berger	Patrik Berger	—	—
2021	Bleachers	"Big Life"	Take the Sadness Out of Saturday Night	Sole writing ‡	Patrik Berger	—	—
2021	Bleachers	"Don't Go Dark"	Take the Sadness Out of Saturday Night	Lana Del Rey	Patrik Berger	—	—
2021	Bleachers	"Strange Behavior"	Take the Sadness Out of Saturday Night	Sole writing ‡	Sole production ‡	—	—
2021	Sia	"Play Dumb"	Music – Songs from and Inspired by the Motion Picture	Sia Furler	Sia	—	—
2021	Sam Dew	"(RAP SH*T)"	MOONLIT FOOLS	Spencer Stewart, Nolan Kramer, Sam Dew, Zeph Sowers	Sam Dew, Anthony Nolan	—	—
2021	Sam Dew	"DJ"	MOONLIT FOOLS	Sam Dew, Terius Nash	Sole production ‡	—	—
2021	Sam Dew	"TO YOUR FACE"	MOONLIT FOOLS	Sam Dew, Terius Nash	Sole production ‡	—	—
2021	Sam Dew	"DO OVER"	MOONLIT FOOLS	Sounwave, Spencer Stewart, Sam Dew	Sounwave	—	—
2021	Lana Del Rey	"White Dress"	Chemtrails over the Country Club	Lana Del Rey	Lana Del Rey	—	—
2021	Lana Del Rey	"Chemtrails over the Country Club"	Chemtrails over the Country Club	Lana Del Rey	Lana Del Rey	—	58
2021	Lana Del Rey	"Tulsa Jesus Freak"	Chemtrails over the Country Club	Lana Del Rey	Lana Del Rey	—	—
2021	Lana Del Rey	"Let Me Love You Like a Woman"	Chemtrails over the Country Club	Lana Del Rey	Lana Del Rey	—	87
2021	Lana Del Rey	"Wild at Heart"	Chemtrails over the Country Club	Lana Del Rey	Lana Del Rey	—	—
2021	Lana Del Rey	"Dark But Just a Game"	Chemtrails over the Country Club	Lana Del Rey	Lana Del Rey	—	—
2021	Lana Del Rey	"Not All Who Wander Are Lost"	Chemtrails over the Country Club	Lana Del Rey	Lana Del Rey	—	—
2021	Lana Del Rey	"Breaking Up Slowly"	Chemtrails over the Country Club	—	Lana Del Rey	—	—
2021	Lana Del Rey	"Dance Till We Die"	Chemtrails over the Country Club	Lana Del Rey	Lana Del Rey	—	—
2021	Lana Del Rey	"For Free" (featuring Zella Day and Weyes Blood)	Chemtrails over the Country Club	—	Lana Del Rey	—	—
2021	Taylor Swift	"Mr. Perfectly Fine"	Fearless (Taylor's Version)	—	Taylor Swift	30	30
2021	Taylor Swift	"That's When" (featuring Keith Urban)	Fearless (Taylor's Version)	—	Taylor Swift	103	—
2021	Taylor Swift	"Don't You"	Fearless (Taylor's Version)	—	Taylor Swift	114	—
2021	Taylor Swift	"Bye Bye Baby"	Fearless (Taylor's Version)	—	Taylor Swift	—	—
2021	Taylor Swift	"Babe (Taylor's Version)"	Red (Taylor's Version)	—	Taylor Swift	69	—
2021	Taylor Swift	"Forever Winter"	Red (Taylor's Version)	—	Taylor Swift	79	—
2021	Taylor Swift	"All Too Well (10 Minute Version) (Taylor's Version)"	Red (Taylor's Version)	—	Taylor Swift	1	3
2021	Olivia Rodrigo	"1 Step Forward, 3 Steps Back"	Sour	Olivia Rodrigo, Taylor Swift	—	19	—
2021	Olivia Rodrigo	"Deja Vu"	Sour	Olivia Rodrigo, Dan Nigro, Taylor Swift, Annie Clark	—	3	4
2021	St. Vincent	"Pay Your Way in Pain"	Daddy's Home	Annie Clark	Annie Clark	—	—
2021	St. Vincent	"Down and Out Downtown"	Daddy's Home	—	Annie Clark	—	—
2021	St. Vincent	"Daddy's Home"	Daddy's Home	Annie Clark	Annie Clark	—	—
2021	St. Vincent	"Live in the Dream"	Daddy's Home	—	Annie Clark	—	—
2021	St. Vincent	"The Melting of the Sun"	Daddy's Home	—	Annie Clark	—	—
2021	St. Vincent	"Humming (Interlude 1)"	Daddy's Home	—	Annie Clark	—	—
2021	St. Vincent	"The Laughing Man"	Daddy's Home	Annie Clark	Annie Clark	—	—
2021	St. Vincent	"Down"	Daddy's Home	Annie Clark	Annie Clark	—	—
2021	St. Vincent	"Humming (Interlude 2)"	Daddy's Home	—	Annie Clark	—	—
2021	St. Vincent	"Somebody Like Me"	Daddy's Home	—	Annie Clark	—	—
2021	St. Vincent	"My Baby Wants a Baby"	Daddy's Home	—	Annie Clark	—	—
2021	St. Vincent	"...At the Holiday Party"	Daddy's Home	Annie Clark	Annie Clark	—	—
2021	St. Vincent	"Candy Darling"	Daddy's Home	—	Annie Clark	—	—
2021	St. Vincent	"Humming (Interlude 3)"	Daddy's Home	—	Annie Clark	—	—
2021	Lorde	"The Path"	Solar Power	—	Lorde, Malay	—	—
2021	Lorde	"Solar Power"	Solar Power	Ella Yelich-O'Connor	Lorde	64	17
2021	Lorde	"California"	Solar Power	Ella Yelich-O'Connor	Lorde	—	—
2021	Lorde	"Stoned at the Nail Salon"	Solar Power	Ella Yelich-O'Connor	Lorde	—	—
2021	Lorde	"Fallen Fruit"	Solar Power	Ella Yelich-O'Connor	Lorde	—	—
2021	Lorde	"Secrets from a Girl (Who's Seen it All)"	Solar Power	Ella Yelich-O'Connor, Robin Carlsson	Lorde	—	—
2021	Lorde	"The Man with the Axe"	Solar Power	—	Lorde, Malay	—	—
2021	Lorde	"Dominoes"	Solar Power	Ella Yelich-O'Connor	Lorde	—	—
2021	Lorde	"Big Star"	Solar Power	Ella Yelich-O'Connor	Lorde	—	—
2021	Lorde	"Leader of a New Regime"	Solar Power	—	Lorde, Malay	—	—
2021	Lorde	"Mood Ring"	Solar Power	Ella Yelich-O'Connor	Lorde	—	—
2021	Lorde	"Oceanic Feeling"	Solar Power	—	Lorde	—	—
2021	Lorde	"Helen of Troy"	Solar Power	Ella Yelich-O'Connor	Lorde	—	—
2021	Lorde	"Hold No Grudge"	Solar Power	—	Lorde, Malay	—	—
2021	Diana Ross	"I Still Believe"	Thank You	—	Charlie McClean	—	—
2021	Clairo	"Bambi"	Sling	Claire Cottrill	Clairo	—	—
2021	Clairo	"Amoeba"	Sling	Claire Cottrill	Clairo	—	—
2021	Clairo	"Partridge"	Sling	Claire Cottrill	Clairo	—	—
2021	Clairo	"Zinnias"	Sling	Claire Cottrill	Clairo	—	—
2021	Clairo	"Blouse"	Sling	—	Clairo	—	—
2021	Clairo	"Wade"	Sling	—	Clairo	—	—
2021	Clairo	"Harbor"	Sling	—	Clairo, Sam Baker	—	—
2021	Clairo	"Just for Today"	Sling	—	Clairo	—	—
2021	Clairo	"Joanie"	Sling	Claire Cottrill	Clairo	—	—
2021	Clairo	"Reaper"	Sling	—	Clairo	—	—
2021	Clairo	"Little Changes"	Sling	Claire Cottrill	Clairo	—	—
2021	Clairo	"Management"	Sling	—	Clairo, Jake Passmore	—	—
2021	St. Vincent	"The Nowhere Inn"	The Nowhere Inn	—	Annie Clark	—	—
2022	Spoon	"Wild"	Wild - EP	Britt Daniel	—	—	—
2022	Spoon	"Jack Wild"	Wild - EP	Britt Daniel	Spoon	—	—
2022	Florence and the Machine	"King"	Dance Fever	Florence Welch	Florence Welch	—	54
2022	Florence and the Machine	"Free"	Dance Fever	Florence Welch	Florence Welch, Dave Bayley	—	—
2022	Florence and the Machine	"Choreomania"	Dance Fever	Florence Welch, Thomas Bartlett	Florence Welch, Thomas Bartlett	—	—
2022	Florence and the Machine	"Back in Town"	Dance Fever	Florence Welch	Florence Welch	—	—
2022	Florence and the Machine	"Girls Against God"	Dance Fever	Florence Welch	Florence Welch	—	—
2022	Florence and the Machine	"Dream Girl Evil"	Dance Fever	—	Florence Welch, Dave Bayley, Thomas Bartlett	—	—
2022	Florence and the Machine	"Prayer Factory"	Dance Fever	Florence Welch	—	—	—
2022	Florence and the Machine	"Cassandra"	Dance Fever	Florence Welch, Kid Harpoon	Florence Welch, Kid Harpoon	—	—
2022	Florence and the Machine	"Heaven Is Here"	Dance Fever	—	Florence Welch, Kid Harpoon, Dave Bayley	—	—
2022	Florence and the Machine	"The Bomb"	Dance Fever	—	Florence Welch, Thomas Bartlett	—	—
2022	Florence and the Machine	"Morning Elvis"	Dance Fever	—	Florence Welch, Dave Bayley	—	—
2022	Diana Ross and Tame Impala	"Turn Up the Sunshine"	Minions: The Rise of Gru (Original Motion Picture Soundtrack)	Kevin Parker, Patrik Berger, Sam Dew	Sole production ‡	—	—
2022	Brittany Howard and Verdine White	"Shining" (cover of the Earth, Wind & Fire song)	Minions: The Rise of Gru (Original Motion Picture Soundtrack)	—	Sole production ‡	—	—
2022	St. Vincent	"Funkytown" (cover of the Lipps Inc. song)	Minions: The Rise of Gru (Original Motion Picture Soundtrack)	—	St. Vincent	—	—
2022	BROCKHAMPTON	"Hollywood Swinging" (cover of the Kool & the Gang song)	Minions: The Rise of Gru (Original Motion Picture Soundtrack)	—	Sole production ‡	—	—
2022	Kali Uchis	"Desafinado" (cover of the Antônio Carlos Jobim song)	Minions: The Rise of Gru (Original Motion Picture Soundtrack)	—	Sole production ‡	—	—
2022	Caroline Polachek	"Bang Bang" (cover of the Cher song)	Minions: The Rise of Gru (Original Motion Picture Soundtrack)	—	Sole production ‡	—	—
2022	Thundercat	"Fly Like an Eagle" (cover of the Steve Miller Band song)	Minions: The Rise of Gru (Original Motion Picture Soundtrack)	—	Sole production ‡	—	—
2022	Phoebe Bridgers	"Goodbye to Love" (cover of The Carpenters song)	Minions: The Rise of Gru (Original Motion Picture Soundtrack)	—	Sole production ‡	—	—
2022	Bleachers	"Instant Karma!" (cover of the John Lennon song)	Minions: The Rise of Gru (Original Motion Picture Soundtrack)	—	Sole production ‡	—	—
2022	Weyes Blood	"You're No Good" (cover of the Dee Dee Warwick song)	Minions: The Rise of Gru (Original Motion Picture Soundtrack)	—	Sole production ‡	—	—
2022	Gary Clark Jr.	"Vehicle" (cover of The Ides of March song)	Minions: The Rise of Gru (Original Motion Picture Soundtrack)	—	Sole production ‡	—	—
2022	H.E.R.	"Dance to the Music" (cover of the Sly and the Family Stone song)	Minions: The Rise of Gru (Original Motion Picture Soundtrack)	Sly Stone, H.E.R.	Sole production ‡	—	—
2022	Tierra Whack	"Black Magic Woman" (cover of the Fleetwood Mac song)	Minions: The Rise of Gru (Original Motion Picture Soundtrack)	—	Sole production ‡	—	—
2022	Verdine White	"Cool"	Minions: The Rise of Gru (Original Motion Picture Soundtrack)	Sam Dew, Mikey Freedom Hart, Sean Hutchinson, Verdine White	Sole production ‡	—	—
2022	Jackson Wang	"Born to Be Alive" (cover of the Patrick Hernandez song)	Minions: The Rise of Gru (Original Motion Picture Soundtrack)	—	Sole production ‡	—	—
2022	Pierre Coffin (as The Minions)	"Cecilia" (cover of Simon & Garfunkel song)	Minions: The Rise of Gru (Original Motion Picture Soundtrack)	—	Sole production ‡	—	—
2022	G.E.M.	"Bang Bang" (cover of the Cher song)	Minions: The Rise of Gru (Original Motion Picture Soundtrack)	—	Sole production ‡	—	—
2022	RZA	"Kung Fu Suite"	Minions: The Rise of Gru (Original Motion Picture Soundtrack)	—	Sole production ‡	—	—
2022	The 1975	"The 1975"	Being Funny in a Foreign Language	Matty Healy, George Daniel	Matty Healy, George Daniel	—	—
2022	The 1975	"Happiness"	Being Funny in a Foreign Language	Matty Healy, George Daniel	Matty Healy, George Daniel	—	—
2022	The 1975	"Looking For Somebody (To Love)"	Being Funny in a Foreign Language	Matty Healy, George Daniel	Matty Healy, George Daniel	—	—
2022	The 1975	"Part of the Band"	Being Funny in a Foreign Language	Matty Healy, George Daniel	Matty Healy, George Daniel	—	—
2022	The 1975	"Oh Caroline"	Being Funny in a Foreign Language	Matty Healy, George Daniel	Matty Healy, George Daniel	—	—
2022	The 1975	"I'm In Love With You"	Being Funny in a Foreign Language	Matty Healy, George Daniel	Matty Healy, George Daniel	—	—
2022	The 1975	"All I Need To Hear"	Being Funny in a Foreign Language	Matty Healy, George Daniel	Matty Healy, George Daniel	—	—
2022	The 1975	"Wintering"	Being Funny in a Foreign Language	Matty Healy, George Daniel	Matty Healy, George Daniel	—	—
2022	The 1975	"Human Too"	Being Funny in a Foreign Language	Matty Healy, George Daniel	Matty Healy, George Daniel	—	—
2022	The 1975	"About You"	Being Funny in a Foreign Language	Matty Healy, George Daniel	Matty Healy, George Daniel	—	—
2022	The 1975	"When We Are Together"	Being Funny in a Foreign Language	Matty Healy, George Daniel	Matty Healy, George Daniel	—	—
2022	Taylor Swift	"Lavender Haze"	Midnights	Taylor Swift, Zoë Kravitz. Mark Anthony Spears, Jahaan Sweet, Sam Dew	Taylor Swift, Sounwave, Jahaan Sweet, Braxton Cook	2	3
2022	Taylor Swift	"Maroon"	Midnights	Taylor Swift	Taylor Swift	3	—
2022	Taylor Swift	"Anti-Hero"	Midnights	Taylor Swift	Taylor Swift	1	1
2022	Taylor Swift	"Snow on the Beach" (featuring Lana Del Rey)	Midnights	Taylor Swift, Lana Del Rey	Taylor Swift	4	4
2022	Taylor Swift	"You're On Your Own, Kid"	Midnights	Taylor Swift	Taylor Swift	8	65
2022	Taylor Swift	"Midnight Rain"	Midnights	Taylor Swift	Taylor Swift	5	—
2022	Taylor Swift	"Question...?"	Midnights	Taylor Swift	Taylor Swift	7	—
2022	Taylor Swift	"Vigilante Shit"	Midnights	—	Taylor Swift	10	—
2022	Taylor Swift	"Bejeweled"	Midnights	Taylor Swift	Taylor Swift	6	63
2022	Taylor Swift	"Labyrinth"	Midnights	Taylor Swift	Taylor Swift	14	—
2022	Taylor Swift	"Karma"	Midnights	Taylor Swift, Mark Anthony Spears, Jahaan Sweet, Keanu Torres	Taylor Swift, Sounwave, Jahaan Sweet, Keanu Beats	9	—
2022	Taylor Swift	"Sweet Nothing"	Midnights	—	Taylor Swift	15	—
2022	Taylor Swift	"Mastermind"	Midnights	Taylor Swift	Taylor Swift	13	—
2022	Taylor Swift	"Bigger Than the Whole Sky"	Midnights (3am Edition)	—	Taylor Swift	21	—
2022	Taylor Swift	"Paris"	Midnights (3am Edition)	Taylor Swift	Taylor Swift	32	—
2022	Taylor Swift	"Glitch"	Midnights (3am Edition)	Taylor Swift, Mark Anthony Spears, Sam Dew	Taylor Swift, Sounwave	41	—
2022	Taylor Swift	"Dear Reader"	Midnights (3am Edition)	Taylor Swift	Taylor Swift	45	—
2022	Taylor Swift	"Hits Different"	Midnights (The Til Dawn Edition)	Taylor Swift, Aaron Dessner	Taylor Swift, Aaron Dessner	27	—
2022	Taylor Swift	"Anti-Hero" (Remix) (featuring Bleachers)	Anti Hero (Remixes) - EP	Taylor Swift	Taylor Swift, Mikey Freedom Hart	—	—
2022	Lana Del Rey	"Did You Know That There's a Tunnel Under Ocean Blvd"	Did You Know That There's a Tunnel Under Ocean Blvd	—	Lana Del Rey, Drew Erickson, Mike Hermosa, Zach Dawes	98	
2023	Lana Del Rey	"A&W"	Did You Know That There's a Tunnel Under Ocean Blvd	Lana Del Rey, Sam Dew	Lana Del Rey	—	41
2023	Lana Del Rey	"Judah Smith Interlude"	Did You Know That There's a Tunnel Under Ocean Blvd	Lana Del Rey, Judah Smith	Lana Del Rey	—	—
2023	Lana Del Rey	"Jon Batiste Interlude"	Did You Know That There's a Tunnel Under Ocean Blvd	—	Lana Del Rey, Zach Dawes	—	—
2023	Lana Del Rey	"Kintsugi"	Did You Know That There's a Tunnel Under Ocean Blvd	Lana Del Rey	Lana Del Rey, Laura Sisk	—	—
2023	Lana Del Rey	"Paris, Texas" (featuring SYML)	Did You Know That There's a Tunnel Under Ocean Blvd	—	Lana Del Rey	—	—
2023	Lana Del Rey	"Grandfather please stand on the shoulders of my father while he's deep-sea fishing" (featuring Riopy)	Did You Know That There's a Tunnel Under Ocean Blvd	—	Lana Del Rey	—	—
2023	Lana Del Rey	"Margaret" (featuring Bleachers)	Did You Know That There's a Tunnel Under Ocean Blvd	Lana Del Rey	Lana Del Rey	—	—
2023	Lana Del Rey	'Fishtail"	Did You Know That There's a Tunnel Under Ocean Blvd	Lana Del Rey, Aljosha Frederick Konstanty, Ann Tomberlin	Lana Del Rey	—	—
2023	Lana Del Rey	"Peppers" (featuring Tommy Genesis)	Did You Know That There's a Tunnel Under Ocean Blvd	—	Lana Del Rey, Lysaght, Father	—	—
2023	Lana Del Rey	"Taco Truck x VB"	Did You Know That There's a Tunnel Under Ocean Blvd	Lana Del Rey, Mike Hermosa	Lana Del Rey	—	—
2023	Taylor Swift	"Karma" (Remix) (featuring Ice Spice)	Midnights (The Til Dawn Edition)	Taylor Swift, Mark Anthony Spears, Jahaan Sweet, Keanu Torres, Ice Spice, RiotUSA	Taylor Swift, Sounwave, Jahaan Sweet, Keanu Beats	2	12
2023	Taylor Swift	"You're Losing Me"	Midnights (The Late Night Edition)	Taylor Swift	Taylor Swift	27	—
2023	Taylor Swift	"I Can See You"	Speak Now (Taylor's Version)	—	Taylor Swift	5	6
2023	Taylor Swift	"Castles Crumbling" (featuring Hayley Williams)	Speak Now (Taylor's Version)	—	Taylor Swift	31	—
2023	Taylor Swift	"Timeless"	Speak Now (Taylor's Version)	—	Taylor Swift	48	—
2023	Taylor Swift	"Out of the Woods (Taylor's Version)"	1989 (Taylor's Version)	Taylor Swift	Taylor Swift	16	—
2023	Taylor Swift	"I Wish You Would (Taylor's Version)"	1989 (Taylor's Version)	Taylor Swift	Taylor Swift	31	—
2023	Taylor Swift	"You Are in Love (Taylor's Version)"	1989 (Taylor's Version)	Taylor Swift	Taylor Swift	43	—
2023	Taylor Swift	"'Slut!'"	1989 (Taylor's Version)	Taylor Swift, Patrik Berger	Taylor Swift, Patrik Berger	3	5
2023	Taylor Swift	"Say Don't Go"	1989 (Taylor's Version)	—	Taylor Swift	5	7
2023	Taylor Swift	"Now That We Don't Talk"	1989 (Taylor's Version)	Taylor Swift	Taylor Swift	2	2
2023	Taylor Swift	"Suburban Legends"	1989 (Taylor's Version)	Taylor Swift	Taylor Swift	10	—
2023	Taylor Swift	"Is It Over Now?"	1989 (Taylor's Version)	Taylor Swift	Taylor Swift	1	1
2023	Taylor Swift	"Sweeter than Fiction (Taylor's Version)"	1989 (Taylor's Version)	Taylor Swift	Taylor Swift	—	—
2023	Rob Grant	"Setting Sail On a Distant Horizon"	Lost At Sea	—	Luke Howard	—	—
2023	Rob Grant	"The Poetry of Wind and Waves"	Lost At Sea	—	Luke Howard	—	—
2023	Rob Grant	"A Beautiful Delirium"	Lost At Sea	—	Luke Howard	—	—
2023	Rob Grant	"My Deep Blue Dream"	Lost At Sea	—	Luke Howard	—	—
2023	Rob Grant	"Hollywood Bowl" (featuring Lana Del Rey)	Lost At Sea	—	Lana Del Rey, Laura Sisk, Zach Dawes	—	—
2023	Maren Morris	"Get The Hell Out Of Here"	The Bridge - Single	—	Maren Morris, Jimmy Robbins	—	—
2023	Bleachers	"Modern Girl"	Bleachers	Evan Smith	Patrik Berger	—	—
2023	Bleachers	"Alma Mater"	Bleachers	Lana Del Rey	Patrik Berger, Lana Del Rey	—	—
2024	Bleachers	"Tiny Moves"	Bleachers	Patrik Berger	Patrik Berger	—	—
2024	Bleachers	"Me Before You"	Bleachers	Patrik Berger	Patrik Berger	—	—
2024	Bleachers	"I Am Right On Time"	Bleachers	Patrik Berger	Patrik Berger, Bartees Strange	—	—
2024	Bleachers	"Jesus Is Dead"	Bleachers	Patrik Berger	Patrik Berger	—	—
2024	Bleachers	"Isimo"	Bleachers	Sole writing ‡	Patrik Berger	—	—
2024	Bleachers	"Woke Up Today"	Bleachers	Sole writing ‡	Patrik Berger	—	—
2024	Bleachers	"Self Respect"	Bleachers	Florence Welch	Patrik Berger, Florence Welch	—	—
2024	Bleachers	"Hey Joe"	Bleachers	Aaron Dessner	Patrik Berger	—	—
2024	Bleachers	"Call Me After Midnight"	Bleachers	Sam Dew, Kevin Abstract, Romil Hemani, Ryan Beatty	Patrik Berger, Kevin Abstract, Romil Hemani, Ryan Beatty	—	—
2024	Bleachers	"We're Gonna Know Each Other Forever"	Bleachers	Patrik Berger	Patrik Berger	—	—
2024	Bleachers	"Ordinary Heaven"	Bleachers	Patrik Berger, Sounwave	Patrik Berger, Sounwave	—	—
2024	Bleachers	"The Waiter"	Bleachers	Sole writing ‡	Patrik Berger	—	—
2024	Bleachers	"I Am In Your Hands"	Bleachers (Deluxe)	Patrik Berger	Patrik Berger	—	—
2024	Bleachers	"The Backwards Heart"	Bleachers (Deluxe)	Sole writing ‡	Sole production ‡	—	—
2024	Bleachers	"Question Mark"	Bleachers (Deluxe)	Patrik Berger	Patrik Berger	—	—
2024	Bleachers	"The Big Bad Turnpike Ghost"	Bleachers (Deluxe)	Sole writing ‡	Sole production ‡	—	—
2024	Bleachers	"Margo"	Bleachers (Deluxe)	Sole writing ‡	Sole production ‡	—	—
2024	Bleachers	"Alma Mater (from the day it was written"	Bleachers (Deluxe)	Lana Del Rey	Lana Del Rey	—	—
2024	Bleachers	"Drug Free America"	Bleachers (Deluxe)	Sole writing ‡	Sole Production ‡	—	—
2024	Bleachers	"Self Respect (Acoustic)"	Bleachers (Deluxe)	Florence Welch	Sole Production ‡	—	—
2024	Bleachers	"Prisoners of Paradise"	Silver Patron Saints: The Sounds of Jesse Malin	—	Sole Production ‡	—	—
2024	Florence + the Machine	"White Cliffs of Dover"	The New Look: Season 1 (Apple TV+ Original Series Soundtrack)	—	Sole production ‡	—	—
2024	The 1975	"Now Is The Hour"	The New Look: Season 1 (Apple TV+ Original Series Soundtrack)	—	Sole production ‡	—	—
2024	Lana Del Rey	"Blue Skies"	The New Look: Season 1 (Apple TV+ Original Series Soundtrack)	—	Sole production ‡	—	—
2024	Perfume Genius	"What a Difference a Day Makes"	The New Look: Season 1 (Apple TV+ Original Series Soundtrack)	—	Sole production ‡	—	—
2024	Nick Cave	"La Vie En Rose"	The New Look: Season 1 (Apple TV+ Original Series Soundtrack)	—	Sole production ‡	—	—
2024	Beabadoobee	"It’s Only a Paper Moon"	The New Look: Season 1 (Apple TV+ Original Series Soundtrack)	—	Sole production ‡	—	—
2024	Joy Oladokun	"I Wished Upon The Moon"	The New Look: Season 1 (Apple TV+ Original Series Soundtrack)	—	Sole production ‡	—	—
2024	Bartees Strange	"You Always Hurt The One You Love"	The New Look: Season 1 (Apple TV+ Original Series Soundtrack)	—	Sole production ‡	—	—
2024	Sam Dew	"I Cover The Waterfront"	The New Look: Season 1 (Apple TV+ Original Series Soundtrack)	—	Sole production ‡	—	—
2024	Bleachers	"Almost Like Being In Love"	The New Look: Season 1 (Apple TV+ Original Series Soundtrack)	—	Sole production ‡	—	—
2024	Paramore	"Sanity (Re: Jack Antonoff)"	Re: This Is Why	Hayley Williams, Taylor York, Zac Farro	Sole production ‡	—	—
2024	Taylor Swift	"Fortnight" (featuring Post Malone)	The Tortured Poets Department	Taylor Swift, Austin Post	Taylor Swift, Louis Bell	1	1
2024	Taylor Swift	"The Tortured Poets Department"	The Tortured Poets Department	Taylor Swift	Taylor Swift	4	3
2024	Taylor Swift	"My Boy Only Breaks His Favorite Toys"	The Tortured Poets Department	—	Taylor Swift	6	—
2024	Taylor Swift	"Down Bad"	The Tortured Poets Department	Taylor Swift	Taylor Swift	2	4
2024	Taylor Swift	"But Daddy I Love Him"	The Tortured Poets Department	—	Taylor Swift, Aaron Dessner	7	—
2024	Taylor Swift	"Fresh Out the Slammer"	The Tortured Poets Department	Taylor Swift	Taylor Swift	11	—
2024	Taylor Swift	"Florida!!!" (featuring Florence + the Machine)	The Tortured Poets Department	Taylor Swift, Florence Welch	Taylor Swift	8	—
2024	Taylor Swift	"Guilty as Sin?"	The Tortured Poets Department	Taylor Swift	Taylor Swift	10	—
2024	Taylor Swift	"Who's Afraid of Little Old Me?"	The Tortured Poets Department	—	Taylor Swift	9	—
2024	Taylor Swift	"I Can Fix Him (No Really I Can)"	The Tortured Poets Department	Taylor Swift	Taylor Swift	20	—
2024	Taylor Swift	"I Can Do It with a Broken Heart"	The Tortured Poets Department	Taylor Swift	Taylor Swift	3	8
2024	Taylor Swift	"The Alchemy"	The Tortured Poets Department	Taylor Swift	Taylor Swift	13	—
2024	Taylor Swift	"The Black Dog"	The Tortured Poets Department: The Anthology	—	Taylor Swift	25	—
2024	Taylor Swift	"Imgonnagetyouback"	The Tortured Poets Department: The Anthology	Taylor Swift	Taylor Swift	26	v
2024	Taylor Swift	"Thank You Aimee"	The Tortured Poets Department: The Anthology	—	Taylor Swift, Aaron Dessner	23	—
2024	Taylor Swift	"I Look in People's Windows"	The Tortured Poets Department: The Anthology	Taylor Swift, Patrik Berger	Taylor Swift, Patrik Berger	39	—
2024	Kendrick Lamar	"6:16 in LA"	Non-album single	—	Sounwave	—	—
2024	Kendrick Lamar	"Wacced Out Murals"	GNX	—	Dahi, Frano, Sounwave, Tyler Mehlenhacher, Craig Balmoris, M-Tech	4	—
2024	Kendrick Lamar	"Squabble Up"	GNX	—	Kendrick Lamar, Sounwave, Bridgeway, M-Tech	1	4
2024	Kendrick Lamar	"Luther" (with SZA)	GNX	—	Sounwave, Rose Lilah, M-Tech, Bridgeway, Kamasi Washington	1	4
2024	Kendrick Lamar	"Man at the Garden"	GNX	—	Tyler Mehlenbacher, Craig Balmoris, Sounwave, M-Tech	9	—
2024	Kendrick Lamar	"Hey Now" (featuring dody6)	GNX	—	Mustard, Sounwave	5	—
2024	Kendrick Lamar	"Reincarnated"	GNX	—	Kendrick Lamar, Sounwave, M-Tech, Noah Ehler	8	—
2024	Kendrick Lamar	"TV Off" (featuring Lefty Gunplay)	GNX	—	Mustard, Sean Momberger, Sounwave, Kamasi Washington	2	6
2024	Kendrick Lamar	"Dodger Blue" (featuring Wallie the Sensei, Siete7x, Roddy Rich)	GNX	—	Tim Maxley, Tane Runo, Sounwave, Terrace Martin	11	—
2024	Kendrick Lamar	"Heart Pt. 6"	GNX	—	Sounwave, M-Tech, Juju	14	—
2024	Kendrick Lamar	"GNX" (featuring Hitta J3, Youngthreat, Peysoh)	GNX	—	Rascal, Kenny & Billy, Sounwave, Tim Maxey	24	—
2024	Kendrick Lamar	"Gloria" (with SZA)	GNX	—	Deats, Sounwave	27	—
2024	Sabrina Carpenter	"Please Please Please"	Short n' Sweet	Sabrina Carpenter, Amy Allen	Sole production ‡	1	3
2024	Sabrina Carpenter	"Sharpest Tool"	Short n' Sweet	Sabrina Carpenter, Amy Allen	Sole production ‡	21	—
2024	Sabrina Carpenter	"Slim Pickins"	Short n' Sweet	Sabrina Carpenter, Amy Allen	Sole production ‡	27	—
2024	Sabrina Carpenter	"Lie to Girls"	Short n' Sweet	Sabrina Carpenter, Amy Allen	Sole production ‡	41	—
2024	Gracie Abrams	"Us" (featuring Taylor Swift)	The Secret of Us	—	Gracie Abrams, Taylor Swift, Aaron Dessner	36	37
2024	Lana Del Rey and Quavo	"Tough"	Non-album single	Quavo, Lana Del Rey, Clayton Johnson, Andrew Watt, Benny Negrin, Elysse Yulo, Cirkut, Jaxson Free, Josh Dorr, Maddox Batson, Nick Bailey	—	33	32
2024	Bleachers	"Wild Heart"	A Stranger Desired	John Hill	Sole production ‡	—	—
2024	Bleachers	"Rollercoaster"	A Stranger Desired	John Hill	Sole production ‡	—	—
2024	Bleachers	"Shadow"	A Stranger Desired	John Hill, Emile Haynie	Sole production ‡	—	—
2024	Bleachers	"I Wanna Get Better"	A Stranger Desired	John Hill	Sole production ‡	—	—
2024	Bleachers	"Wake Me"	A Stranger Desired	John Hill, Patrik Berger	Sole production ‡	—	—
2024	Bleachers	"Reckless Love"	A Stranger Desired	John Hill	Sole production ‡	—	—
2024	Bleachers	"Take Me Away"	A Stranger Desired	John Hill, Claire Boucher	Sole production ‡	—	—
2024	Bleachers	"Like a River Runs"	A Stranger Desired	John Hill	Sole production ‡	—	—
2024	Bleachers	"You're Still a Mystery"	A Stranger Desired	John Hill	Sole production ‡	—	—
2024	Bleachers	"I'm Ready to Move On / Wild Heart Reprise"	A Stranger Desired	John Hill, Yoko Ono	Sole production ‡	—	—
2024	Bleachers	"Who I Want You to Love"	A Stranger Desired	John Hill, Emile Haynie	Sole production ‡	—	—
2024	Bleachers	"Merry Christmas, Please Don't Call"	Non-album single	Sole writing ‡	Sole production ‡	—	—
2024	Bartees Strange	"Sober"	Horror	—	Bartees Strange, Lawrence Rothman, Yvus Rothman	—	—
2024	Bartees Strange	"Too Much"	Horror	—	Graham Richman, Bartees Strange	—	—
2024	Japanese Breakfast	"The Ballad of the Witches' Road (Pop Version)"	Agatha All Along	—	Kristen Anderson-Lopez, Robert Lopez	—	—
2024	Maren Morris	"People Still Show Up"	D R E A M S I C L E	Maren Morris, Laura Veltz	Sole production ‡	—	—
2024	Rachel Zegler	"Man Of The House"	Non-album single	Ryan Beatty	Sole production ‡	—	—
2025	Bartees Strange	"Wants Needs"	Horror	—	Bartees Strange, Chris Connors	—	—
2025	Bartees Strange	"Doomsday Buttercup"	Horror	—	Bartees Strange	—	—
2025	Bartees Strange	"17"	Horror	—	Bartees Strange, Lawrence Rothman, Yvus Rothman	—	—
2025	Bartees Strange	"Backseat Banton"	Horror	—	Bartees Strange, Chris Connors	—	—
2025	Bartees Strange	"DCWDTTY"	Non-album single	—	Bartees Strange	—	—
2025	Bartees Strange	"Baltimore (Jack's Version)"	Shy Bairns Get Nowt	—	Bartees Strange	—	—
2025	Sabrina Carpenter	"Please Please Please" (featuring Dolly Parton)	Short n' Sweet (Deluxe)	Amy Allen, Sabrina Carpenter	Sole production ‡	—	—
2025	Sabrina Carpenter	"Busy Woman"	Short n' Sweet (Deluxe)	Amy Allen, Sabrina Carpenter	Sole production ‡	27	6
2025	Sabrina Carpenter	"Bad Reviews"	Short n' Sweet (Deluxe)	—	John Ryan, Ian Kirkpatrick	87	—
2025	Sabrina Carpenter	"Manchild"	Man's Best Friend	Amy Allen, Sabrina Carpenter	Sabrina Carpenter	1	1
2025	Sabrina Carpenter	My Man on Willpower	Man's Best Friend	Amy Allen, Sabrina Carpenter, John Ryan	John Ryan, Sabrina Carpenter	15	7
2025	Sabrina Carpenter	We Almost Broke Up Again Last Night	Man's Best Friend	Amy Allen, Sabrina Carpenter	Sabrina Carpenter	31	
2025	Sabrina Carpenter	When Did You Get Hot?	Man's Best Friend	Amy Allen, Sabrina Carpenter, John Ryan	John Ryan, Sabrina Carpenter	17	9
2025	Sabrina Carpenter	Go Go Juice	Man's Best Friend	Amy Allen, Sabrina Carpenter, John Ryan	John Ryan, Sabrina Carpenter	24	
2025	Sabrina Carpenter	Don't Worry I'll Make You Worry	Man's Best Friend	Amy Allen, Sabrina Carpenter	John Ryan, Sabrina Carpenter	33	
2025	Sabrina Carpenter	House Tour	Man's Best Friend	Amy Allen, Sabrina Carpenter, John Ryan	John Ryan, Sabrina Carpenter	27	17
2025	Sabrina Carpenter	Goodbye	Man's Best Friend	Amy Allen, Sabrina Carpenter	John Ryan, Sabrina Carpenter	33	
2025	Sabrina Carpenter	Such a Funny Way	Man's Best Friend (Bonus Track Version)	Amy Allen, Sabrina Carpenter	Sabrina Carpenter	63	27
2025	Doja Cat	"Crack"	Promotional single	?	?	—	—
2025	Doja Cat	"Jealous Type"	Vie	Amala Zandile Dlamini, Ari Starace	Y2K	28	13
2025	Doja Cat	"Cards"	Vie	Amala Zandile Dlamini, Ari Starace, Gavin Bennett	Y2K, Gavin Bennett	—	—
2025	Doja Cat	"AAAHH MEN!"	Vie	Amala Zandile Dlamini, Glen Larson, Stuart Philips	Sole production ‡		
2025	Doja Cat	"Couples Therapy"	Vie	Amala Zandile Dlamini, Benjamin BOUKRIS	Benjamin BOUKRIS		
2025	Doja Cat	"Gorgeous"	Vie	Amala Zandile Dlamini, George Daniel, Kurtis McKenzie, Lee Stashenko, Mark Spears, Stavros Tsarouhas	George Daniel, Sounwave, f a l l e n, Stavros, Kurtis McKenzie	56	34
2025	Doja Cat	"Stranger"	Vie	Amala Zandile Dlamini, Kurtis McKenzie, Lee Stashenko, Mark Spears, Stavros Tsarouhas	Sounwave, f a l l e n, Stavros, Kurtis McKenzie		
2025	Doja Cat	"Take Me Dancing" (featuring SZA)	Vie	Amala Zandile Dlamini, Ari Starace, Gavin Bennett, Joe Calab, Kurtis McKenzie, Mike 'Scribz' Riley	Gavin Bennett, Y2K		
2025	Doja Cat	"Lipstain"	Vie	Alastair O'Donnell, Amala Zandile Dlamini, Dennis Lambert, Felix Joseph, Finn Wigan, J.C. Crowley, Kurtis McKenzie, Sam Dees	Kurtis McKenzie, Felix Joseph, Finn Wigan, AoD		
2025	Doja Cat	"Come Back"	Vie	Amala Zandile Dlamini, Giuseppe Donaggio	Sole production ‡		
2025	Maren Morris	"Grand Bouquet"	D R E A M S I C L E	Maren Morris, Laura Veltz	Sole production ‡	—	—
2025	Maren Morris	"Holy Smoke"	D R E A M S I C L E	Maren Morris, Laura Veltz	Sole production ‡	—	—
2025	Maren Morris	"Welcome to the End"	Non-album single	—	Sole production ‡	—	—
2025	Cassandra Coleman	“Coming of Age”	Non-album single	—	Scott Krueger	—	—
2025	Lace Manhattan	"ODDWADD"	Honey Don't (Original Motion Picture Soundtrack)	Ethan Coen	Sole production ‡	—	—
2025	Lace Manhattan	"Little Black Star"	Honey Don't (Original Motion Picture Soundtrack)	—	Sole production ‡	—	—
2025	Lace Manhattan	"Girl"	Honey Don't (Original Motion Picture Soundtrack)	Jack Manning, Margaret Qualley, Talia Ryder	Jack Manning	—	—
2025	Lace Manhattan	"In the Sun She Lies"	Honey Don't (Original Motion Picture Soundtrack)	Ethan Coen	Sole production ‡	—	—
2025	Brittany Howard	"We Gotta Get Out of This Place"	Honey Don't (Original Motion Picture Soundtrack)	—	Sole production ‡	—	—
2025	Margaret Qualley, Aubrey Plaza, Talia Ryder	"Honey Don't! (Cast Recording)"	Honey Don't (Original Motion Picture Soundtrack)	—	Sole production ‡	—	—
2026	Lana Del Rey	"White Feather Hawk Tail Deer Hunter"	Non-album single	Lana Del Rey, Drew Erickson, Jason Pickens, Caroline Grant, Jeremy Dufrene, Johnny Mercer, David Raksin	Lana Del Rey, Drew Erickson	—	58
2026	Bleachers	"You and Forever"	Everyone for Ten Minutes	Sole writing ‡	Sole production ‡	—	—
2026	Bleachers	"Dirty Wedding Dress"	Everyone for Ten Minutes	Sole writing ‡	Sole production ‡	—	—
2026	Bleachers	"The Van"	Everyone for Ten Minutes	Bobby Eli, Mikey Freedom Hart, John Freeman, Vinnie Barrett	Mikey Freedom Hart	—	—
2026	Bleachers	"I'm Not Joking"	Everyone for Ten Minutes	Sean Hutchinson, Michael Riddleberger, Evan Smith, Zem Audu, Mikey Freedom Hart	Sole production ‡	—	—
2026	Bleachers	"Sideways"	Everyone for Ten Minutes	Sole writing ‡	Sole production ‡	—	—
2026	Bleachers	"We Should Talk"	Everyone for Ten Minutes	Sean Hutchinson, Michael Riddleberger, Evan Smith, Zem Audu, Mikey Freedom Hart	Sole production ‡	—	—
2026	Bleachers	"Take You Out Tonight"	Everyone for Ten Minutes	Mikey Freedom Hart	Sole production ‡	—	—
2026	Bleachers	"I Can't Believe You're Gone"	Everyone for Ten Minutes	Sole writing ‡	Sole production ‡	—	—
2026	Bleachers	"Dancing"	Everyone for Ten Minutes	Sole writing ‡	Sole production ‡	—	—
2026	Bleachers	"She's From Before"	Everyone for Ten Minutes	Sole writing ‡	Sole production ‡	—	—
2026	Bleachers	"Upstairs at ELS"	Everyone for Ten Minutes	Sole writing ‡	Sole production ‡	—	—
2026	Anne Hathaway	"Burial"	Mother Mary: Greatest Hits	Anne Hathaway, Charli xcx, George Daniel	Charli xcx, George Daniel	—	—
2026	Anne Hathaway	"Holy Spirit"	Mother Mary: Greatest Hits	Anne Hathaway, Charli xcx, George Daniel	Charli xcx, George Daniel	—	—
2026	Anne Hathaway	"Holy Spirit 2"	Mother Mary: Greatest Hits	Claire Givens, David Lowery, Aaron Boudreaux	John Michael Rouchell, Christoph Andersson	—	—
2026	Anne Hathaway	"Dark Cradle"	Mother Mary: Greatest Hits	Charli xcx, Patrik Berger	Charli xcx, Patrik Berger	—	—
2026	Anne Hathaway	"Blue Flame"	Mother Mary: Greatest Hits	Charli xcx, George Daniel, Mark Anthony Spears	Charli xcx, George Daniel, Sounwave, Patrik Berger	—	—
2026	Anne Hathaway	"Cut Ties"	Mother Mary: Greatest Hits	Anne Hathaway, Charli xcx, George Daniel, Patrik Berger	Charli xcx, Patrik Berger	—	—
2026	Kelsey Lu	"Running to Pain"	So Help Me God	Kelsey Lu, Yves Rothman, Nate Campany, Daniel Wilson	Kelsey Lu, Yves Rothman	—	—
2026	Kelsey Lu	"Comfort"	So Help Me God	Kelsey Lu, Casey MQ, Yves Rothman, Joe Kennedy, Paris Strother	Kelsey Lu, Yves Rothman, Casey MQ	—	—
2026	Kelsey Lu	"Reaper"	So Help Me God	—	Kelsey Lu, Yves Rothman	—	—
2026	Kelsey Lu	"What Can I Do"	So Help Me God	Kelsey Lu, Yves Rothman, Jonas Rönnberg	Kelsey Lu, Yves Rothman, Jonas Rönnberg	—	—
2026	Kelsey Lu	"American Sonnet"	So Help Me God	—	Kelsey Lu	—	—
2026	Kelsey Lu	"Better Than That"	So Help Me God	Kelsey Lu, Yves Rothman, Sampha Sisay, Miguel Atwood-Ferguson	Kelsey Lu, Yves Rothman	—	—
2026	Kelsey Lu	"Cutting Off the Head Of a Ghost"	So Help Me God	Kelsey Lu, Yves Rothman, Patrick Wimberly, Nate Campany, Rahm B Silverglade	Kelsey Lu, Yves Rothman, Patrick Wimberly	—	—
2026	Taylor Swift	"I Knew It, I Knew You"	Toy Story 5 (Original Motion Picture Soundtrack)	Taylor Swift	Taylor Swift	1	1
2026	Phoebe Bridgers	"Lost Boys"	Lost Weekend	—	Phoebe Bridgers, Tony Berg, Ethan Gruska, Alex G	85	50
2026	Phoebe Bridgers	"The Outside"	Lost Weekend	—	Phoebe Bridgers, Tony Berg, Ethan Gruska, Alex G	—	—
2026	Phoebe Bridgers	"Kill Me"	Lost Weekend	—	Phoebe Bridgers, Tony Berg, Ethan Gruska, Alex G	100	—
2026	Phoebe Bridgers	"The Governer's Waltz"	Lost Weekend	—	Phoebe Bridgers, Tony Berg, Ethan Gruska, Alex G	80	53
2026	Phoebe Bridgers	"Bobby"	Lost Weekend	Phoebe Bridgers, Christian Lee Hutson, Ethan Gruska, Marshall Vore, Bo Burnham	Phoebe Bridgers, Tony Berg, Ethan Gruska, Alex G	83	—
2026	Phoebe Bridgers	"Lost Weekend"	Lost Weekend	—	Phoebe Bridgers, Tony Berg, Ethan Gruska, Alex G	—	39
2026	Phoebe Bridgers	"Haunted"	Lost Weekend	—	Phoebe Bridgers, Tony Berg, Ethan Gruska, Alex G	—	—
2026	Phoebe Bridgers	"Panorama"	Lost Weekend	—	Phoebe Bridgers, Tony Berg, Ethan Gruska, Alex G	—	—
2026	Phoebe Bridgers	"Still Standing"	Lost Weekend	—	Phoebe Bridgers, Tony Berg, Ethan Gruska, Alex G	—	—
2026	Phoebe Bridgers	"Liberty Tree"	Lost Weekend	—	Phoebe Bridgers, Tony Berg, Ethan Gruska, Alex G	—	—
2026	Phoebe Bridgers	"Never Going Back"	Lost Weekend	—	Phoebe Bridgers, Tony Berg, Ethan Gruska, Alex G	—	—
2026	Phoebe Bridgers	"Other Plans"	Lost Weekend	—	Phoebe Bridgers, Tony Berg, Ethan Gruska, Alex G	—	—
2026	Phoebe Bridgers	"Lost Parade"	Lost Weekend	—	Phoebe Bridgers, Tony Berg, Ethan Gruska, Alex G	—	—
2026	Phoebe Bridgers	"I Can't Wait"	Lost Weekend	—	Phoebe Bridgers, Tony Berg, Ethan Gruska, Alex G	—	—
2026	Phoebe Bridgers	"As Above"	Lost Weekend	—	Phoebe Bridgers, Tony Berg, Ethan Gruska, Alex G	—	—
2026	Phoebe Bridgers	"Lost Weekend (Reprise)"	Lost Weekend	—	Phoebe Bridgers, Tony Berg, Ethan Gruska, Alex G	—	—
2026	Phoebe Bridgers	"On Video"	Primetime (Original Soundtrack)	Phoebe Bridgers, Christian Lee Hutson	Phoebe Bridgers, Tony Berg, Ethan Gruska, Marshall Vore, Alex G	—	—
2026	Troye Sivan	"She's the Best"	She's the Best	Troye Sivan, George Daniel, Leland, Kaeyln Behr	Troye Sivan, George Daniel Styalz Fuego	—	—
2026	Troye Sivan	"I Do This For You"	She's the Best	Oscar Görres, Troye Sivan, Leland, Britten Newbill, Carl Stephenson, Jaspr Baj, Kevin Krakower	Oscar Görres, Troye Sivan	—	—
2026	Troye Sivan	"Cowboy"	She's the Best	Tyde Levi, Rob LFO, Troye Sivan, George Daniel, Jack D'Arcy, Leland	Tyde Levi, Rob LFO, George Daniel	—	—
2026	Troye Sivan	"Troye Meets World"	She's the Best	—	Styalz Fuego, Troye Sivan	—	—
2026	Troye Sivan	"FF"	She's the Best	Troye Sivan, George Daniel, Leland, Jasper Harris, Madison Love, Henry Walter	Cirkut, George Daniel, Jasper Harris	—	—
2026	Bleachers	"Caught Myself Believing"	Practical Magic 2 (Original Motion Picture Soundtrack)	Troye Sivan, Leland	Sole production ‡	—	—
