= Marooned =

Marooned may refer to:

- Marooning, the intentional act of abandoning someone in an uninhabited area

== Film and television ==
- Marooned (1933 film), a
- Marooned (1969 film), an American science-fiction film
- Marooned (1994 film), a short film
- Marooned (2004 film), a football documentary
- Marooned (2019 film), a short film included on the home media releases of Abominable
- "Marooned" (Legends of Tomorrow), an episode of Legends of Tomorrow
- "Marooned" (Red Dwarf), an episode of Red Dwarf
- "Marooned" (The Ren & Stimpy Show), an episode of The Ren & Stimpy Show
- Marooned with Ed Stafford, a documentary television series

== Other uses ==
- File:Marooned by Edward J Gregory.jpg, the 1887 oil painting by Edward John Gregory
- Marooned (novel), by Martin Caidin, 1964
- Marooned (band), an American a cappella band
- "Marooned" (instrumental), on Pink Floyd's 1994 album The Division Bell
- "Marooned", a song from the album Death or Glory by Running Wild

== See also ==
- Maroon (disambiguation)
- Maroons (disambiguation)
