= Maron (disambiguation) =

Saint Maron (died 410), a Syriac Christian hermit monk and the namesake of the Maronite Church.

- Saint John Maron (died 707), a Syriac Christian monk and the first Maronite Patriarch.

Maron may also refer to:

== People ==
- Maron (surname)
- Maroun (name)

== Fictional or mythological characters ==
- Maron (mythology), son of Evanthes
- Maron, a character in the Dragon Ball Z anime series
- Maron Kusakabe, in the manga series Phantom Thief Jeanne
- Cécile de Maron, in the German soap opera Verbotene Liebe

== Places ==
- Mâron, Indre, France, a commune
- Maron, Meurthe-et-Moselle, France, a commune
- Máron, Crasna, Sălaj, Romania
- Maron Island, Manus Province, Papua New Guinea

== Other uses ==
- Maron (TV series), an American comedy TV series
- Railway station on the Main Line in Thomas & Friends

== See also ==
- Marun (disambiguation)
- Marron (disambiguation)
- Maroon (disambiguation)
