= The Black Dog (song) =

2024 song by Taylor Swift

Song by Taylor Swift

from the album The Tortured Poets Department: The Anthology
- Released: April 19, 2024
- Studio: Conway Recording, Los Angeles; Electric Lady, New York
- Genre: Post-industrial; power ballad
- Length: 3:58
- Label: Republic
- Songwriter: Taylor Swift
- Producers: Taylor Swift; Jack Antonoff

Lyric video
- "The Black Dog" on YouTube

"The Black Dog" is a song written and recorded by the American singer-songwriter Taylor Swift for her eleventh studio album, The Tortured Poets Department (2024). Produced by her and Jack Antonoff, the track is post-industrial in the form of a power ballad. It starts slow and builds up with a sparse, piano–led arrangement, which is juxtaposed by a brief dynamic shift during the chorus. In the lyrics, Swift mourns a past relationship and imagines an ex-partner with another woman at a bar that they used to visit, resulting in heartbreak and resentment.

"The Black Dog" was first released as a bonus track in a physical edition of The Tortured Poets Department on April 19, 2024, and then digitally as part of a double album edition, subtitled The Anthology, two hours later. A website-exclusive demo recording was temporarily available as a digital-edition bonus track. The song reached number 26 on the Billboard Global 200 and the top 30 of national charts in Australia, Canada, New Zealand, and the United States. It has been certified platinum in Brazil and gold in Australia and New Zealand.

Most critics gave "The Black Dog" positive reviews, in which several regarded it as a highlight of the double album. They found the lyricism engaging and clever and praised the intensity of both the production and Swift's vocal performance. Swift performed the song in three shows on her Eras Tour (2023–2024), as part of mashups with her other songs.

== Background and production ==
Taylor Swift started work on her eleventh original studio album, The Tortured Poets Department, following the completion of her previous album, Midnights (2022). She continued on it during the US leg of her Eras Tour in 2023, which heightened her fame while she was experiencing intense media reports on her personal life, including past romantic relationships with the English artists Joe Alwyn and Matty Healy. Swift described the album as a "lifeline" for her and one that she "needed" to create, detailing how its development somewhat reminded her that songwriting was an integral part of her life. Jack Antonoff, a regular collaborator of Swift, co-produced 16 out of the 31 tracks intended for the album. One such track which he produced with Swift was "The Black Dog", a song that she wrote and originally named "Old Habits Die Screaming" when first recording it at her phone.

The official recording of "The Black Dog" was done by the engineers Oli Jacobs and Laura Sisk at Conway Recording Studios in Los Angeles and Electric Lady Studios in New York City. Swift provided background vocals and played piano with Antonoff, who handled the programming and played the majority of the instruments: acoustic, bass, and electric guitars, drums, cello, vocoder, and multiple keyboards. (Note: The keyboards that Antonoff played were the Mellotron, the Rhodes piano, and synthesizers (Juno 6, Polysix, M1).) Sean Hutchinson played additional drums and recorded his parts with Michael Riddleberger at Hutchinson Sound Studio in Brooklyn. Bobby Hawk played strings that were recorded by Jack Manning. The track was mixed by Serban Ghenea at Mixstar Studios in Virginia Beach, with assistance from Bryce Bordone, and it was mastered by Randy Merrill and Ryan Smith.

== Composition ==
"The Black Dog"
As Swift sings the lyric "Old habits die screaming" that ends the first chorus (sampled), the production briefly employs a tense shift in dynamics where it crescendos with thumping synth beats and multitracked vocal harmonies.

At a length of 3 minutes and 58 seconds, "The Black Dog" is post-industrial in the form of a power ballad. A sparse arrangement led by bare piano accompanies the song, which begins at a slow pace and builds up for the rest of its length. In an Uproxx review, Josh Kurp wrote that there were influences from Phoebe Bridgers's works because of how the song intensifies towards the end. Variety's Chris Willman had a similar sentiment, saying that it continues to progressively elevate into an "emo climax".

The lyrics of "The Black Dog" depict Swift's mourning of a past relationship and explores the theme that losing someone could result in the loss of a familiar location as well, which was also detailed in the fellow album track "So Long, London". The location in question is a bar called the Black Dog, where she and an ex-partner used to visit together. It opens with Swift discovering that her phone can still track the location of the ex-partner, who forgot to disable sharing it with her, and seeing him go to the bar. In the chorus, she visualizes him inside attracting a woman who is too young to discern one of their favorite songs by the Starting Line playing in the background. These thoughts cause a realization in Swift that leads to her heartbreak and being deceived. Affected to the point of hiring a priest to get rid of her demons, she admits that she is unable to understand how he got over her.

At the end of the chorus, the production employs a tense shift in dynamics and crescendos when Swift sings the lyric, "Old habits die screaming", which also concludes the song altogether. Instruments escalate during the moment, in addition to incorporating thumping synth beats and multitracked vocal harmonies. Critics considered the moment explosive and identified Swift's vocals as "screeching", "seething tidily", and "sing-shout[ing]". Mary Sirosky, writing for Consequence, described it as rupturing with "energy, guitar, and drums" at maximum volume and then dissipating. Commenting on the lyric, a staff member from Slant Magazine believed that it was a twist on the phrase, "Old habits die hard", and relates to the "torture" themes of the album. For the Los Angeles Times's Kaitlyn Huamani, the lyric implied that Swift is having a tough time moving on from the relationship.

Later in the track, Swift's pain changes into anger, wishing the ex-partner the worst time possible: "And I hope it's shitty in The Black Dog". She also compares him to a dog with the lyric, "tail between your legs, you're leaving", which uses an idiom that expresses shame or embarrassment. Allaire Nuss of Entertainment Weekly described the song as "an understated, intimate funeral march for a love long gone", while Rolling Stone's Rob Sheffield wrote that it was a satirization of Swift's "post-breakup phone-stalker tendencies". The music journalist Annie Zaleski said that the song deals with "the painful experience of discovering an ex has moved on with someone else and is living the life you were meant to have together".

Some critics analyzed the song's lyrics in relation to its title. George Mills, a scholar in philosophy, wrote that the narrative was a "modernization of the black dog myths from folklore" and that the namesake bar indicated "the death of [Swift's] relationship". In Beats Per Minute, John Wohlmacher said that her character could be the black dog from the novel series Harry Potter named Grim, a misinterpreted "dark omen" whom he likens to the narrator on whether if she is an "avenger or protector when her ex hooks up with a much younger girl". "The Black Dog" also shares its name with a pub in Vauxhall, which gained public attraction from Swift's fans worldwide following its release and prompted discussions on whether the song's subject could be Alwyn or Healy.

== Release and live performances ==
"The Black Dog" was initially released as a bonus track as part of a physical edition of The Tortured Poets Department, which was temporarily available for pre-order at Swift's website and was released alongside the standard edition on April 19, 2024, under Republic Records. The song became available for streaming and digital download two hours later, when a double album edition, subtitled The Anthology, was surprise-released with all 31 songs made for the album including it, beginning the second part as the 17th track. On May 16, 2024, the song's first demo recording was available on Swift's website as a limited-time bonus track on the album's digital edition.

"The Black Dog" reached the top 30 of the Billboard Global 200 (at 26) as well as the national charts of the United States (25), Canada (26), and New Zealand (26). In Australia, the song peaked at number 25 on the ARIA Singles Chart and helped made Swift the artist with the most single-week entries on the chart with 29. It further entered the national charts of Portugal and Switzerland, with respective peaks of 67 and 95. On other charts, it reached Greece's International Top 100 Digital Singles chart (at 58), Sweden's Heatseeker chart (1), and the United Kingdom's audio streaming (30) and sales charts (61). The song has been certified platinum in Brazil and gold in Australia and New Zealand.

Swift performed "The Black Dog" live on piano, as part of mashups of her other songs, three times throughout the Eras Tour in 2024. She debuted the track at a London concert on June 21, combining it with "Come Back... Be Here" (2012) and "Maroon" (2022). Swift wore a long orange dress during the performance, which Mitchell Peters of Billboard thought the song's portion was wonderfully done. At a Warsaw show of the tour on August 3, she sang a mashup of "The Black Dog" and "Exile" (2020), which surprised and relished the audience. Swift once more performed the song and fused it with "Haunted" (2010) during a New Orleans tour show on October 25. Bryan West from USA Today believed that she brought out an "emotional mashup" of both tracks, while Billboard's Joe Lynch deemed it one of the eight best moments from the show.

== Critical reception ==
"The Black Dog" received positive reviews from most critics, several of whom regarded it as a highlight from the double album. (Note: Attributed to Callie Ahlgrim of Business Insider, Josh Kurp of Uproxx, Kaitlyn Huamani of the Los Angeles Times, Lynn Sharpe of Screen Rant, and Rob Sheffield of Rolling Stone) Wilson regarded the song as one of the "worthwhile" cuts from The Anthology. Willman considered it among Swift's 10 best songs, while Kurp remarked that the track was one of her finest written songs. For Nuss, it was among the double album tracks that deserved to be within the higher ranks of her catalog. "The Black Dog" was included in rankings of the double album's tracks, Swift's songs, her finest breakup tracks, songs produced by Antonoff, and the two's best collaborations.

Many critics believed that the lyricism was entrancing and clever. (Note: Attributed to Callie Ahlgrim of Business Insider, Chris Richards of The Washington Post, Kaitlyn Huamani of the Los Angeles Times, Lauren Webb of Clash, Rob Sheffield of Rolling Stone, and a staff member of Slant Magazine) Writing for Billboard Philippines, Gabriel Saulog selected the song as one of the double album tracks that were triumphant in unveiling the schemes of Swift's mind and exemplified her known expertise in songwriting. Tyler Foggatt from The New Yorker chose "The Black Dog" amongst her "most quietly devastating" tracks and called it petty and egotistical "in the best way" as well as a good song. In the view of NME's Hannah Mylrea, "The Black Dog" was one of the double album tracks that delivered Swift's "most searing songwriting". Similar praise was also given to the concept: Sheffield deemed it a "classic Nashville-worthy premise", Foggatt considered it a remarkably simple one that could make someone mad, and Jason Lipshutz from Billboard noted its universality: "who hasn't wondered if they can trust their own memories, once someone else breaks that trust?" For Willman, he believed that the concept would immediately engage fans and added that the track was a great song regarding people's experiences with other songs. On the other hand, Paste's Grace Byron dismissed the writing as "Tumblr superscript".

The production and Swift's vocal performance were commended for their intensity. (Note: Attributed to Chris Willman of Variety, Josh Kurp of Uproxx, Mary Kate Carr of The A.V. Club, and a staff member of Slant Magazine) Sirosky considered the momentary moments of change in volume outstanding and the song a "welcome addition" to Swift's piano ballads as well. Jonathan Keefe of Slant Magazine wrote that it showcased a technique of how her pitch or wording are controlled to highlight altered idioms, thinking that it was one of her most effective and enhanced parts of the writing quality. There were discussions about the song's aspects in relation to the double album. Describing the track as angry and vindictive, The Daily Telegraph's Neil McCormick said that it was a "very strong" start for The Anthology and had a massive sound that could fit within the standard edition. Sharpe highlighted the song's "fleeting burst of action" in the chorus, considering it alongside Swift's late emotive gasping memorable enough to make the song one of the double album's best tracks.

Various critics also praised other aspects of the track. Ryan Fish of The Hollywood Reporter thought the chorus was huge and roaring as well as one that would relish fans live. Nate Jones from Vulture had similar opinions on its hook and believed that the song contained an enjoyable "throwback vibe". McCormick deemed the hook "punchy", while Sirosky opined that the chorus melody was in "classic Swift earworm style". In Stereogum, Tom Breihan wrote that the production style was reminiscent of immediate predecessors and well suited for Swift's "old-school Nashville-honed storytelling chops".

The Starting Line responded positively to being mentioned twice in the song, with lead singer Kenny Vasoli calling it "a very grateful moment for the band" and "a very sweet name-drop". The band also shared that they felt honored to be "memorialized on such a lovely song". In the weekend following the release of the album, the band's catalog saw a 55% increase in U.S. streams compared to the previous weekend. In a similar vein, Vauxhall pub The Black Dog saw an influx of visitors and started offering Swift-themed items on their menu; a venue manager told BBC News that Swift had previously visited the pub.

== Personnel ==
Credits are adapted from the liner notes of The Tortured Poets Department ("The Black Dog" physical edition).

- Taylor Swift – vocals, background vocals, piano, songwriting, production
- Jack Antonoff – production, programming, acoustic guitar, bass, cello, drums, electric guitar, Mellotron, piano, Rhodes, Juno 6, M1, Polysix, vocoder
- Bobby Hawk – strings
- Sean Hutchinson – drums, engineering
- Laura Sisk – recording engineer
- Michael Riddleberger – engineering
- Oli Jacobs – recording engineer
- Jack Manning – engineering assistance
- Jon Sher – engineering assistance
- Serban Ghenea – mixing
- Bryce Bordone – mix engineering
- Randy Merrill – mastering
- Ryan Smith – mastering

== Charts ==
Chart (2024)	Peak position
Australia (ARIA)	25
Canada Hot 100 (Billboard)	26
Global 200 (Billboard)	26
Greece International (IFPI)	58
New Zealand (Recorded Music NZ)	26
Portugal (AFP)	67
Sweden Heatseeker (Sverigetopplistan)	1
Swiss Streaming (Schweizer Hitparade)	95
UK Singles Sales (OCC)	60
UK Streaming (OCC)	31
US Billboard Hot 100	25

== Certification ==
Certification for "The Black Dog"
Region	Certification	Certified units/sales
Australia (ARIA)	Gold	35,000^{‡}
Brazil (Pro-Música Brasil)	Platinum	40,000^{‡}
New Zealand (RMNZ)	Gold	15,000^{‡}
United Kingdom (BPI)	Silver	200,000^{‡}
^{‡} Sales+streaming figures based on certification alone.
