= Maron (surname) =

Maron is a surname. Notable people with the surname include:

- Anton von Maron (1733–1808), Austrian painter
- Brett Maron (born 1986), American soccer goalkeeper
- Hanna Maron (1923–2013), Israeli actress
- John Maron (died 707), Syriac monk and saint and the first Maronite Patriarch
- Jordan Maron (born 1992), better known as CaptainSparklez, American YouTuber
- Karen Maron (born 1979), Argentine journalist, war correspondent, producer and writer
- Karl Maron (1903–1975), Interior minister of East Germany
- Marc Maron (born 1963), American stand-up comedian and radio and podcast host
- Margaret Maron, American mystery novelist
- Maya Maron (born 1980), Israeli actress
- Melvin Earl Maron, American computer scientist and professor
- Michael Maron, American makeup artist, author, beauty industry entrepreneur, photographer, and media personality
- Monika Maron (born 1941), German author
- Oliver Maron, Slovak ice hockey player
- Therese Maron (1725–1806), German painter

== See also ==
- Maroun (disambiguation)
