= Maroon (disambiguation) =

Maroon is a dark reddish purple or dark brownish red colour.

Maroon may also refer to:

== People ==
- Maroon (surname)
- Maroons, descendants of enslaved Africans in the Americas who escaped and formed free settlements

== Music ==
- Maroon (band), a German band
- Maroon (Barenaked Ladies album) (2000)
- Maroon (The Webb Brothers album) (2000)
- "Maroon" (song), a 2022 song by Taylor Swift

== Places ==
- Mount Maroon, Queensland, Australia
- Maroon Dam, Queensland, Australia
- Maroon Town, Jamaica
- Maroon Town, Sierra Leone
- Maroon Creek, Colorado, United States

== Other uses ==
- Maroon (rocket), a loud rocket used for signalling
- The Chicago Maroon, a student newspaper of the University of Chicago
- Maroon Cartoons, a fictional studio in Who Framed Roger Rabbit

== See also ==
- Maroon 5, an American pop rock band
- Marooned (disambiguation)
- Maroons (disambiguation)
