= Le Marron =

Coordinates: 51°46′57.18″N 5°50′54.05″E

- Interactive map of Le Marron

Restaurant information
- Established: 2005
- Closed: 2014
- Head chef: Ysbrandt Wermenbol
- Food type: International
- Rating: Michelin Guide
- Location: Raadhuisstraat 3, Malden, 6581 AL, Netherlands
- Seating capacity: 40
- Website: Official website

Le Marron is a defunct restaurant in Malden, Netherlands. It is a fine dining restaurant that was awarded one Michelin star in 2007 and retained that rating until its closing in 2014.

The owner and head chef of Le Marron is Ysbrandt Wermenbol, who opened the restaurant in 2005.

In 2013, GaultMillau awarded the restaurant 16 out of 20 points.

The restaurant closed on 25 October 2014.

== See also ==
- List of Michelin starred restaurants in the Netherlands
