= Maroun (name) =

Maroun is a given name and surname. It may refer to:

- Maroun Abboud (1886-1962), Lebanese poet and writer
- Maroun Ammar (born 1956), Bishop of the Maronite Catholic Eparchy of Sidon
- Maroun Bagdadi (1950-1993), Lebanese film director
- Maroun Gantous (born 1996), Arab-Israeli footballer
- Maroun Elias Nimeh Lahham (born 1948), first archbishop of the Roman Catholic Archdiocese of Tunis
- Eddy Maroun, co-founder of Anghami, the first legal music streaming platform and digital distribution company in the Arab world
- Julian Maroun, 21st century Australian actor
- Manuel Moroun (1927–2020), American billionaire businessman

== See also ==
- Maron (disambiguation)
