= Marooned (band) =

Irish band

- Origin: Las Vegas, United States
- Genres: Irish folk and sea shanties
- Years active: Since 1995
- Label: Marooned Music
- Members: Bob Brinkman; Jen Brinkman; Jen Knighton; Keenan Mills; Lenora Mills; Melissa Richardson
- Past members: Dani Aalbertsberg; Ryan Allred; Geneva Metz; Andrew Meyers
- Website: www.marooned.us

Marooned are a U.S.-based a cappella Irish folk/shanty band based in Las Vegas. They were formed in 1995.

== History ==
Marooned first performed at the Las Vegas Age of Chivalry Renaissance Festival in 1995. Their influence was recognized by inclusion and citation of their version of "Look at the Coffin" in the Mallory & McCall's Irish Pub Songbook. They performed at a number of small festivals and local venues until the release of their self-titled debut CD. Their first CD, was recorded at Studio on the Hill in Poway, California over the course of a weekend. The band began touring further, heading to Northern California. In 1999 Marooned (along with the Jackstraws) appeared at the final A&E Networks tall ship battle to promote the new Horatio Hornblower movies.

In 2006, Marooned was named one of the Top 5 Music groups by the Renaissance Festival Music Podcast.

After becoming regulars at Gen Con, Marooned released their second CD, Better Than Live, at Gen Con in 2007. The CD went on to be named the #2 Renaissance Festival album of 2007.

Of specific note, since their first year, Marooned has been part of five charity CD compilations to benefit the city of New Orleans (Circle and Lafitte's Return Vol. 1-4) and continues to make limited appearances across the country. While the group only appears on volumes 1 & 3 of the Lafitte's Return series, member Bob Brinkman produced the CDs and appears as a backup vocalist on Dead Men Tell No Tales (vol. 2) and the Derelict (vol. 4). They have also appeared at the John Levique Pirate Days, a Florida Hurricane Awareness event.

In 2014, Marooned released "On the Scalding Sea: The Music of ElfWood", the soundtrack to the ElfWood setting of the Sixcess RPG by Harsh Realities.

On August 23, 2020, the band announced that former member Andrew Meyers had died from complications arising from COVID-19.

== Band members ==
=== Current members ===
- Bob Brinkman - Baritone
- Jen Brinkman - Soprano
- Jen Knighton - Alto
- Keenan Mills - Tenor
- Lenora Mills - Alto
- Melissa Richardson - Soprano

=== Former members ===
- Dani Aalbertsberg - Soprano
- Ryan Allred - Tenor
- Geneva Metz - Alto
- Andrew Meyers - Baritone (1975–2020)

== Discography ==
- Marooned (2003, Marooned Music)
- From the Bilge (2006, Marooned Music)
- Circle (compilation)(2006, Mage Records)
- Better Than Live (2007, Marooned Music)
- Renaissance Festival Music Podcast (compilation) (2008, Mage Records)
- Lafitte's Return Vol. 1 (compilation) (2008, Pirates for the Preservation of New Orleans Music)
- Lafitte's Return Vol. 3 (compilation) (2008, Pirates for the Preservation of New Orleans Music)
- Squawk (2011, Marooned Music)
- Dance Macaw (2012, Marooned Music)
- Lost at Sea (2014, Marooned Music)
- On the Scalding Sea (2014, Marooned Music)

== See also ==
- Sea shanty
