= Maroons (disambiguation) =

Maroons are descendants of Africans in the Americas who formed settlements away from New World chattel slavery.

Maroons may also refer to:

== Sports ==
- Maroons FC, a Ugandan football club
- Butte Central Catholic High School's athletic teams, Montana, U.S.
- Champaign Central High School's athletic teams, Illinois, U.S.
- Chatham Maroons, a Canadian junior ice hockey team
- Chicago Maroons, the intercollegiate sports teams of the University of Chicago, U.S.
- Clinton High School (Clinton, Illinois)'s athletic teams, Illinois, U.S.
- Gżira United F.C., Malta, nicknamed the Maroons
- Holland Christian High School(Michigan)'s athletic teams, Michigan, U.S.
- Kenosha Maroons, an American football team in 1924
- Kandurata Maroons, is Sri Lankan cricket team
- Lachine Maroons, a Canadian junior ice hockey team
- Mississippi State University's athletic teams, U.S.
- Moline High School's athletic teams, Illinois, U.S.
- Montreal Maroons, a Canadian ice hockey team 1924–1938
- Moose Jaw Maroons, a Canadian minor-league ice hockey team 1926–28
- Pottsville Maroons, an American football team 1925–1928
- Ridgewood High School (New Jersey)'s athletic teams, U.S.
- Roanoke Maroons, the athletic teams of Roanoke College, U.S.
- Queensland rugby league team, Australia, nicknamed the Maroons
- St. Louis Maroons/Indianapolis Hoosiers, an American baseball club 1884–1886
- Toledo Maroons, an American football team 1922–1923
- UP Fighting Maroons, the athletic teams of the University of the Philippines
- Westfort Maroons, a Canadian junior ice hockey team 1993–2006
- Winnipeg Maroons, a Canadian minor League baseball team 1902–1942
- Winnipeg Maroons (ice hockey), Canada, 1960s

== Other uses ==
- Maroons (album), a 1992 album by Geri Allen
- Maroons (hip hop group), former name of Lateef and the Chief, a hip-hop group

== See also ==
- Maroon (disambiguation)
- Great Dismal Swamp maroons
- Jamaican Maroons
- Jamaican Maroons in Sierra Leone
