= Maroon (surname) =

Maroon is a surname. Notable people with the surname include:

- Anthony Maroon, Australian radio presenter
- Darren Maroon (born 1966), Australian rugby league player
- Fred J. Maroon (1924–2001), American photographer
- Patrick Maroon (born 1988), American professional ice hockey player
