= The Tortured Poets Department (song) =

2024 song by Taylor Swift

Song by Taylor Swift

from the album The Tortured Poets Department
- Released: April 19, 2024
- Studio: Conway Recording, Los Angeles; Electric Lady, New York
- Genre: Synth-pop; jangle pop
- Length: 4:53
- Label: Republic
- Songwriters: Taylor Swift; Jack Antonoff
- Producers: Taylor Swift; Jack Antonoff

Lyric video
- "The Tortured Poets Department" on YouTube

"The Tortured Poets Department" is a song by the American singer-songwriter Taylor Swift and the title track of her eleventh studio album, The Tortured Poets Department (2024). Swift wrote and produced the song with Jack Antonoff. A synth-pop and jangle pop song, "The Tortured Poets Department" incorporates hushed drums, sparkling synths arpeggios, and electronic sounds. Its lyrics satirize a relationship between two pretentious artists, mentioning the poets Dylan Thomas and Patti Smith and the musician Charlie Puth.

Music critics compared the production to the music from the 1980s. There were mixed opinions about the song: some found it catchy and complimented the sarcastic tone and melodic production, but some others found the lyrics verbose and overly conversational. "The Tortured Poets Department" peaked at number three on the Billboard Global 200 and reached the top 10 on charts in Australia, Austria, Canada, Hong Kong, Ireland, New Zealand, the Philippines, Singapore, the UK, and the US.

== Background and release ==
Swift announced her eleventh original studio album, The Tortured Poets Department, at the 66th Annual Grammy Awards on February 4, 2024, during her acceptance speech for the Best Pop Vocal Album award. Shortly after the announcement, Swift's website enabled the album to be pre-ordered in vinyl, CD, cassette and digital format. Swift conceived The Tortured Poets Department amidst publicized reports on her personal life, including a breakup with the English actor Joe Alwyn and a brief romantic linking with the English musician Matty Healy. She described it as her "lifeline" album which she "really needed" to make; Republic Records released The Tortured Poets Department on April 19, 2024. The title track, "The Tortured Poets Department", is number two on the album's standard track listing. She performed the song twice on the Eras Tour in 2024 as a part of mashups; with "Now That We Don't Talk" on May 25 in Lisbon and with "Maroon" on December 7 in Vancouver.

== Music and lyrics ==
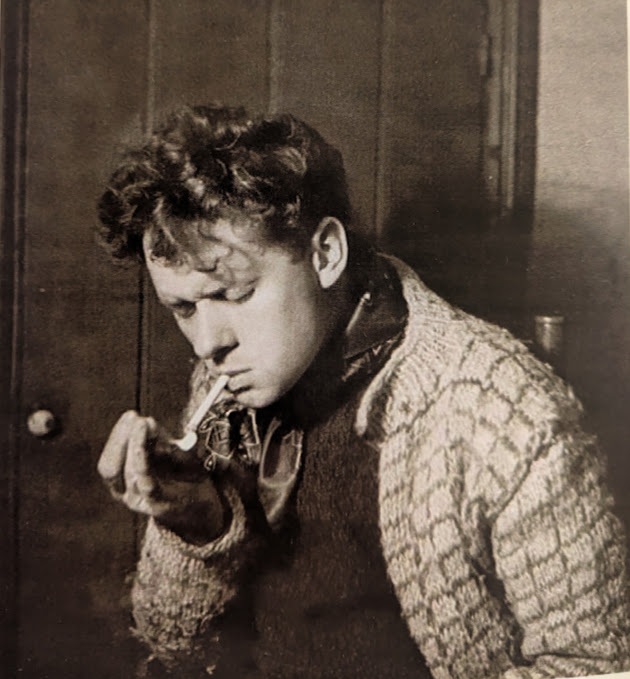
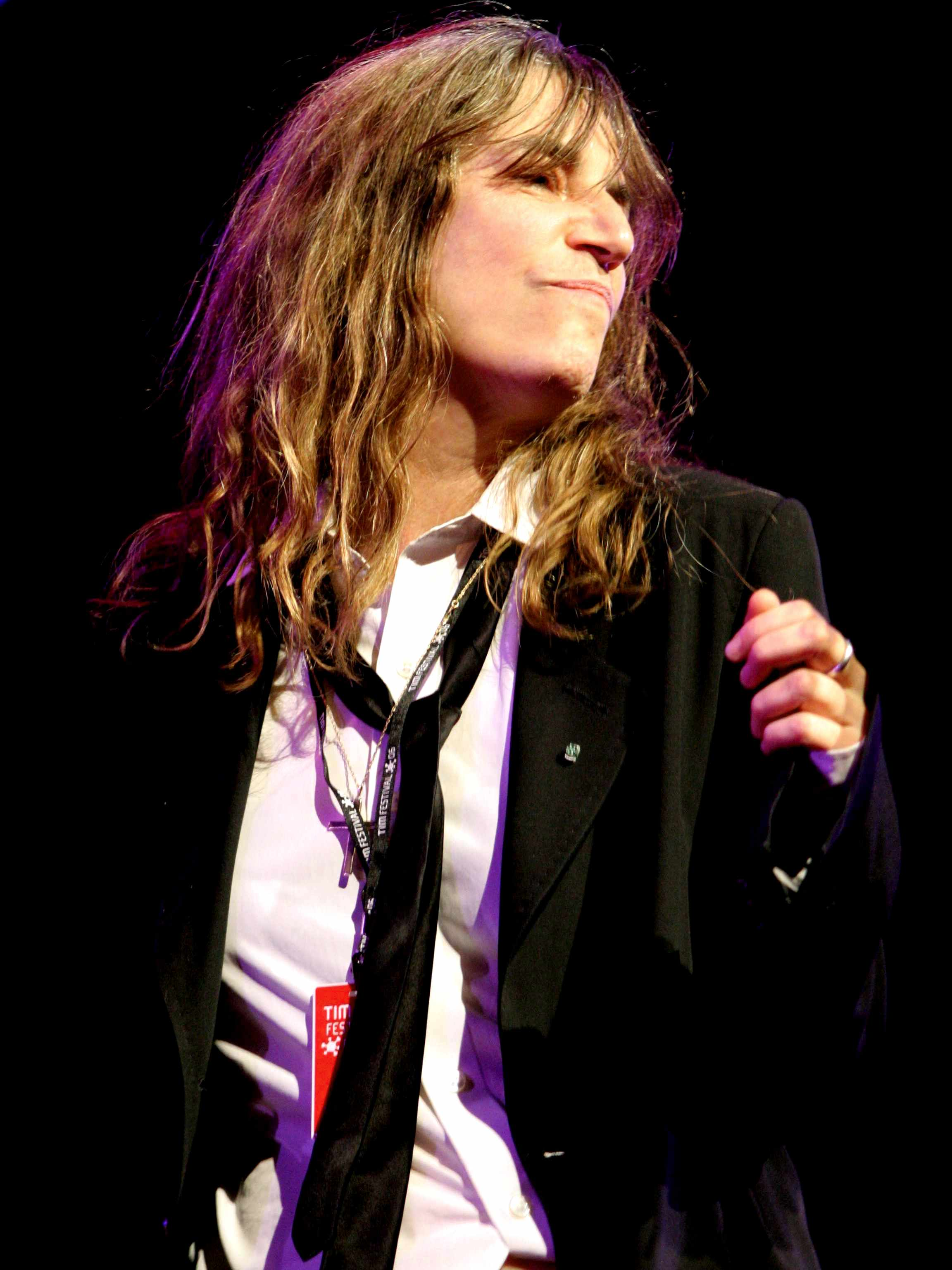
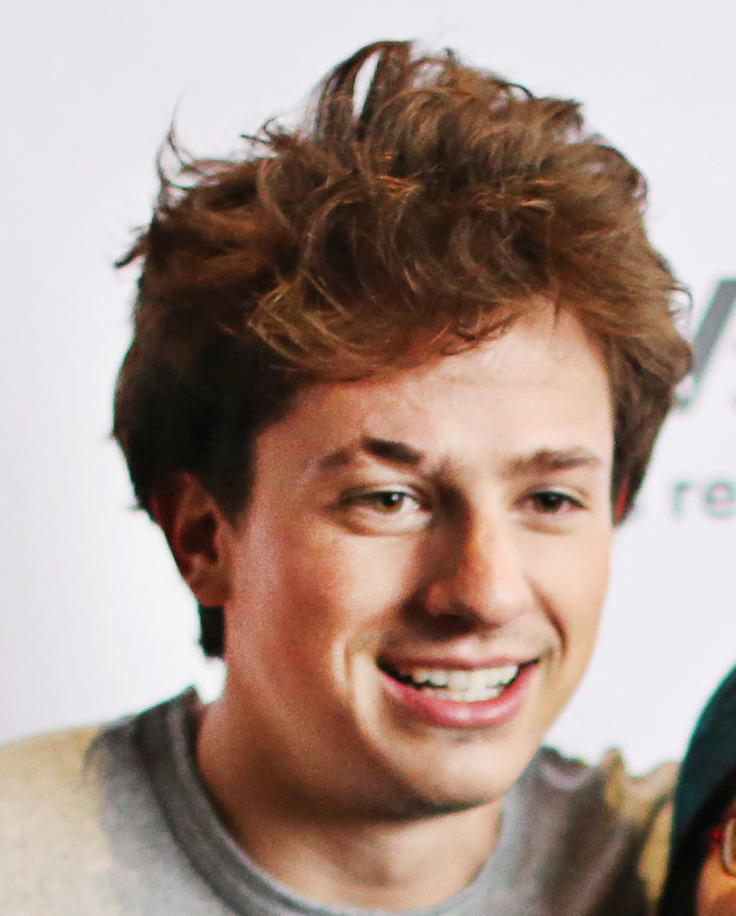
"The Tortured Poets Department" name-checks (left to right) Dylan Thomas, Patti Smith and Charlie Puth.

It is a synth-pop and jangle pop song built on hushed drums, sparkling synth arpeggios, and electronic sounds. According to Clash's Lauren Webb, the song has a 1980s power ballad sensibility that evokes the music of Roxette, Cutting Crew, and Phil Collins. Meanwhile, Bryan West from The Tennessean said that the track's "soft beat" recalls that of Swift's 2023 song "Suburban Legends".

The lyrics of "The Tortured Poets Department" are about experiencing emotional turmoil and heartbreak in a relationship while also being introspective. In the lyrics, Swift's character recalls mutual friends of her and her partner, Lucy and Jack.

"The Tortured Poets Department"
A sample of the track, featuring the sparkling synth arpeggios and hushed drums that create a 1980s-inspired sound

John Wohlmacher of Beats Per Minute interpreted the song's lyrics as satirical, adding that Swift acknowledges her inferiority to the artistic levels of Dylan Thomas and Patti Smith, and believes that achieving great artistry comes from embracing deep self-realization and creative integrity rather than fame. In the song's opening, "Who uses typewriters anyway?", Swift seems to question the use of vintage technology, as an expression of artistic struggle, rather, views the instrument as serving a visual purpose. She calls herself and her partner "modern idiots", a self-critique and awareness of their artistic limitations. Swift possibly desires to gain a deep, genuine engagement in her creative process that Thomas and Smith achieved.

== Critical reception ==
Several music journalists complimented the production of "The Tortured Poets Department". In a ranking of all 31 tracks from The Anthology edition of the album, Billboard's Jason Lipshutz ranked the track at number 11, highlighting the "light and unobtrusive" drums that leave space for Swift's voice and describing the south as a "synth fantasia". Tom Breihan of Stereogum praised the song as an earworm and selected it as one of the album's well-constructed tracks. Webb contended that the track contains "unchartered sonic ground" for Swift, specifically praising the nostalgic 1980s production by Antonoff. Lindsay Zoladz, writing for The New York Times, described "The Tortured Poets Department" as a "chatty, radiant" song that effectively portrays "the flushed delirium of a doomed romance".

There were criticisms of the lyrics as being overwritten or clunky, specifically the lyric, "You smoked, and then ate seven bars of chocolate, We declared Charlie Puth should be a bigger artist. I scratch your head, you fall asleep, like a tattooed Golden Retriever." The said line became the subject of parodies online. In The Irish Times, Finn McRedmond wrote: "[Swift] leaves no space for the song to breathe, cramming in as many words as she can." Screen Rant's Lynn Sharpe placed the song 21st out of the 31 album tracks, deeming the songwriting "overly conversational" and "hyperspecific" that makes it distracting for listeners. Pitchfork's Olivia Horn called it a "winking" track that makes fun of Swift's self-seriousness but criticized how the lyrics' metaphors were ineffective. Business Insider's Callie Ahlgrim said the song succeeds with its intention of being "over-the-top corny and tongue-in-cheek amusing", but felt the production "sounds like an AI-created Midnights parody". On the contrary, Helen Brown of The Independent complimented Swift's lyricism: "I defy anyone not to lean into Swift's concisely charged storytelling." The New Yorker picked it as one of the best pop songs of 2024.

After the song's release, some commentators speculated that the song's lyric alluding to a woman named "Lucy" could be referring to Lucy Dacus of the band Boygenius. In the lyric in question, Swift states that "Lucy" was told "you’d kill yourself if I ever leave", causing speculation that one of Swift's exes may have made the comment to Dacus prior to the release of the album. 11 months after the song's initial release, Dacus later confirmed in March 2025 that she was the "Lucy" referred to in the song, and that Swift had texted Dacus for her approval about including a reference to her in the song's lyrics.

== Commercial performance ==
Following the album's release, nine of its tracks debuted in the top 10 of the Billboard Global 200, with "The Tortured Poets Department" debuting and peaking at number three on the chart. Swift extended her total top 10 entries on the chart to 33. In the United States, the track opened at number four on the Billboard Hot 100. The track, alongside 13 other songs from The Tortured Poets Department, made Swift the first artist to occupy the entire top 14 of the Hot 100. In Australia, "The Tortured Poets Department" debuted at number three on the ARIA Singles Chart and she became the artist with the most simultaneous entries in a single week with 29. In the United Kingdom, it peaked at number three on the UK Singles Chart and extended her total top 10 entries in the country to 28.

Elsewhere, "The Tortured Poets Department" charted within the top 10 in Canada, New Zealand, the Philippines, Singapore, Hong Kong, Austria, India, Switzerland, and Luxembourg. The song also reached the top 20 in several other countries: number 11 in Malaysia, number 12 in Denmark, number 13 in the Middle East and North Africa (MENA) region, number 14 in Greece, number 15 in Sweden, number 16 in Portugal, Belgium, and South Africa, and number 19 in Latvia and Indonesia. The track received a platinum certification in Australia, a gold certification in New Zealand, and a silver certification in the United Kingdom.

== Personnel ==
Credits adapted from the liner notes of The Tortured Poets Department

- Taylor Swift – lead vocals, songwriter, producer
- Jack Antonoff – producer, songwriter, Juno, pocket piano, cello, M1, programming, backing vocals
- Mikey Freedom Hart – bass, acoustic guitar, electric guitar, piano, B3 organ
- Michael Riddleberger – drums
- Evan Smith – synthesizer
- Zem Audu – synthesizer
- Laura Sisk – engineering, recording
- Oli Jacobs – engineering, recording
- Jack Manning – engineering assistance
- Jon Sher – engineering assistance
- Serban Ghenea – mixing
- Bryce Bordone – mix engineering
- Randy Merrill – mastering
- Ryan Smith – vinyl mastering

== Charts ==
Chart performance
Chart (2024)	Peak position
Argentina Hot 100 (Billboard)	60
Australia (ARIA)	3
Austria (Ö3 Austria Top 40)	10
Brazil Hot 100 (Billboard)	55
Canada Hot 100 (Billboard)	3
Croatia (Billboard)	24
Czech Republic Singles Digital (ČNS IFPI)	32
Denmark (Tracklisten)	12
Finland (Suomen virallinen lista)	48
France (SNEP)	55
Global 200 (Billboard)	3
Greece International (IFPI)	14
Hong Kong (Billboard)	8
India International (IMI)	10
Indonesia (Billboard)	19
Ireland (IRMA)	4
Italy (FIMI)	85
Latvia (LAIPA)	19
Luxembourg (Billboard)	10
Malaysia (Billboard)	11
MENA (IFPI)	13
New Zealand (Recorded Music NZ)	4
Norway (VG-lista)	28
Philippines (Billboard)	5
Poland (Polish Streaming Top 100)	72
Portugal (AFP)	16
Singapore (RIAS)	4
Slovakia Singles Digital (ČNS IFPI)	32
South Africa (TOSAC)	16
Sweden (Sverigetopplistan)	15
Switzerland (Schweizer Hitparade)	10
UK Singles (Official Charts)	3
US Billboard Hot 100	4

== Certifications ==
Certifications for "The Tortured Poets Department"
Region	Certification	Certified units/sales
Australia (ARIA)	Platinum	70,000^{‡}
Brazil (Pro-Música Brasil)	2× Platinum	80,000^{‡}
New Zealand (RMNZ)	Gold	15,000^{‡}
United Kingdom (BPI)	Silver	200,000^{‡}
^{‡} Sales+streaming figures based on certification alone.
