= Marron (surname) =

Marron or Marrón is a Spanish surname, which is most common today in Mexico. There is an (unrelated) Irish surname, Ó Mearáin, that is anglicised as ‘Marron,’ originating in County Monaghan. Notable people with the surname include:

- Donald B. Marron Sr. (1934–2019), American financier, private equity investor and entrepreneur
- Donald B. Marron Jr., American economist
- Juan María Marrón (1808–1853), settler of Mexican California
- Loretta Marron (born 1951), chief executive officer of the Australian Friends of Science in Medicine
- Paul-Henri Marron (1754–1832), French-Dutch pastor
- Raymond V. Marron (1899–1978), American football coach
- Sam Marron (1884–1954), Australian footballer
