= Maroon (song) =

2022 song by Taylor Swift

Song by Taylor Swift

from the album Midnights
- Released: October 21, 2022
- Studio: Rough Customer (Brooklyn); Electric Lady (New York)
- Genre: Dream pop; synth-pop; electropop; trip hop
- Length: 3:38
- Label: Republic
- Songwriters: Taylor Swift; Jack Antonoff
- Producers: Taylor Swift; Jack Antonoff

Lyric video
- "Maroon" on YouTube

"Maroon" is a song by the American singer-songwriter Taylor Swift from her tenth original studio album, Midnights (2022). Written and produced by Swift and Jack Antonoff, "Maroon" is a ballad that combines dream pop, synth-pop, electropop, and trip hop. Its ambient production consists of elongated trap beats, reverbed and layered vocals, and an oscillating electric guitar note. The lyrics are about the haunting memories of a past relationship in New York and associate them with different shades of red such as maroon, burgundy, and scarlet.

Several music critics picked "Maroon" as a highlight on Midnights, praising the production and lyrics as evocative; some others found both the theme and sound derivative. "Maroon" peaked at number four on the Billboard Global 200 chart and reached the top 10 in Australia, Canada, Malaysia, New Zealand, the Philippines, and the US. The song received certifications in Australia, Brazil, Canada, New Zealand, and the UK. Swift occasionally performed "Maroon" on her sixth headlining tour, the Eras Tour, in 2023 and 2024.

== Background and release ==
Taylor Swift conceived her tenth studio album, Midnights, as a collection of songs about her nocturnal ruminations, detailing a wide range of emotions such as regret, lust, nostalgia, contentment, and self-loathing. The standard album was produced by Swift and Jack Antonoff, as a result of the two experimenting with music while their partners were both shooting for a film in Panama. Swift announced Midnights at the 2022 MTV Video Music Awards on August 28; its title and cover artwork were released shortly the same day via social media. She announced the album's track listing via a thirteen-episode short video series called Midnights Mayhem with Me on the platform TikTok, where each video contained the title of one track at a time. The title of "Maroon" was revealed in an episode posted on September 30, 2022. Republic Records released Midnights on October 21, 2022; "Maroon" is track number two out of 13 songs on the standard edition.

"Maroon" debuted and peaked at number four on the Billboard Global 200 chart, issued for November 5, 2022. In the US, the track debuted and peaked at number three on the Billboard Hot 100 chart; together with other Midnights tracks, it made Swift the first musician to occupy the entire top 10 of the Hot 100 chart the same week. Elsewhere, "Maroon" reached the top 10 on the singles charts of Australia, Canada, and the Philippines (peaking at number four), Malaysia and New Zealand (number five); and the top 20 in Portugal and Vietnam (number 11), Iceland and South Africa (number 12), Croatia (number 19), and Luxembourg (number 20). The song has been certified platinum in Australia, Brazil, Canada, and New Zealand; and gold in the UK.

== Lyrics ==
The lyrics of "Maroon" detail the memories of a long-gone romance: Swift's narrator reminisces about an ex-lover whom she used to dance with in New York City. The first verse recalls the romantic and sweet moments of their relationship, while the second details a fight that makes the couple realize bitter truths: the roses that they had imagined turned out to be carnations, and the narrator had to sacrifice rubies. In the bridge, the narrator laments how that relationship still haunts her ("And I wake with your memory over me/ That's a real fucking legacy, legacy").

In the refrain, Swift's narrator associates various moments and items with red shades: the pink of a cheap rosé, the burgundy of a wine stain on her T-shirt, and the scarlet of how her cheeks blushed. She uses the color maroon to evoke the remnants of that relationship: a hickey on her neck, "the rust that grew between telephones", "the lips [she] used to call home", and the funeral carnations. Several commentators opined that the imagery of telephone wires rusting implies that the relationship in question was a long-distance one and fell apart due to lack of communication.

Various interpretations connected "Maroon" to Swift's past songs. Billboard's Jason Lipshutz wrote that many of the lyrical motifs on "Maroon" were hallmarks in Swift's songwriting: memories in rich detail, vulnerability, missed romance, and the resultant feelings. Some reviewers noted a probable reference to Swift's 2012 album Red, with Carl Wilson from Slate saying that "Maroon" was a "more melancholy and experienced version" with similar themes about heartbreak. John Wohlmacher of Beats Per Minute wrote that in addition to Red, "Maroon" references the "flushed cheeks" imagery on "Illicit Affairs" (2020). He added that the New York setting was similar to the sentiments of "Cornelia Street" (2019) and "Hoax" (2020), which represented "a secret affair and emotionally crushing loss". Sharing the same idea, Powers and Rob Sheffield from Rolling Stone commented that "Maroon" was a sequel to "Cornelia Street", a track about a haunting romance set in New York. Sheffield added that "Maroon" recalled the New York romance of "Holy Ground" from Red.

== Production and music ==
Swift wrote and produced "Maroon" with Antonoff, who programmed the track and played instruments including percussion, synthesizers (Juno 6, modular synth), piano, electric and bass guitars. Evan Smith played organ, saxophone, flute, and clarinet, and he recorded his own performance at Pleasure Hill Recording in Portland, Maine. Antonoff and engineer Laura Sisk recorded "Maroon" at Rough Customer Studio in Brooklyn and Electric Lady Studios in New York City. The track was engineered by Antonoff, Sisk, and Smith, with assistance from John Rooney, Jon Sher, and Megan Searl. "Maroon" was mixed by Serban Ghenea with assistance from Bryce Bordone at MixStar Studios in Virginia Beach, Virginia, and mastered by Randy Merrill at Sterling Sound in Edgewater, New Jersey.

"Maroon"
A sample of the first chorus in "Maroon", depicting the moody ambience, echoing drums, and buzzing drone.

"Maroon" is 3 minutes and 38 seconds long. It is a ballad with an atmospheric and ambient soundscape. The production incorporates a thick reverb, layered vocals, synthesizers, and preset drums that create elongated trap beats. It uses an electric guitar played on an EBow, which creates a single note that sustains and slowly oscillates up and down through the track; Alexis Petridis of The Guardian said the guitar sound evoked shoegaze. The song's second half has a buzzing synth drone. Music critics characterize the genre as dream pop, synth-pop, electropop, and trip hop.

The Line of Best Fit's Paul Bridgewater described the production as "brooding", and Spin's Bobby Olivier regarded the track as a "slow burner". In Paste, Ellen Johnson compared the trap-tinged production and "light rapping" on "Maroon" to the music of "Dress", a track off Swift's 2017 album Reputation. Ann Powers from NPR said "Maroon" evoked the music of the drama series Twin Peaks, while Pitchfork's Vrinda Jagota said the "droning synths" resembled Lorde's 2017 album Melodrama. Wohlmacher found the single-note electric guitar to complement the "lingering pain" expressed in the lyrics, resulting in a "borderline traumatic" listening experience. Quinn Moreland from Pitchfork wrote that whereas the lyrics were intensely personal, the production had a "consistently austere" atmosphere that made the track "oddly impersonal, bordering on numb".

== Critical reception ==
Some critics praised the lyrics of "Maroon". Courteney Larossa and Callie Ahlgrim from Business Insider hailed "Maroon" as a standout track from Midnights; Lacrossa called the song a "brilliant" play on Swift's color theory about love, while Ahlgrim stated that it was a "shimmering" nostalgic rush of her past songs. Kenneth Partridge, in an article for Genius, found it to contain some of the most poetic lyrics Swift had written. Melissa Ruggieri from USA Today described the lyrical imagery as "striking" and "classically vivid".

Some others were fond of the production. Sheffield praised the song as a "gorgeous ballad", and Esquire's Alex Bilmes said it had "a killer vocal and lyrics worthy of a Ryan Murphy soap opera". Lipshutz said that although "Maroon" contained many of Swift's songwriting details that had been familiar, "their impact hasn't dulled one bit". Wohlmacher labeled it as an "immediate masterpiece" and said it was "maybe the pop song of the year", and Moreland said that it was a track that "may be the one that keeps [her] awake at night". Petridis called the song "superb" and deemed it to represent the album's subdued, atmospheric production, and Bridgewater remarked that it was one of the album's "minor flashes of brilliance". Mark Richardson of The Wall Street Journal deemed "Maroon" the best track on Midnights because it "unfolds gradually and hits an exciting peak where words and tune are precisely matched".

In a less enthusiastic review, Jon Caramanica of The New York Times was not impressed by the production and said that Swift's vocals were "stacked together to the point of suffocation". Similarly, Paul Attard from Slant Magazine found the production somewhat redundant. Wilson considered "Maroon" a decent song on its own but thought that it made the album drag. He added that its songwriting was "a bit generic and fan-servicey". Exclaim!'s Megan LaPierre appreciated the first verse and the bridge but found that the rest of the song "stumbles in comparison".

== Live performances ==
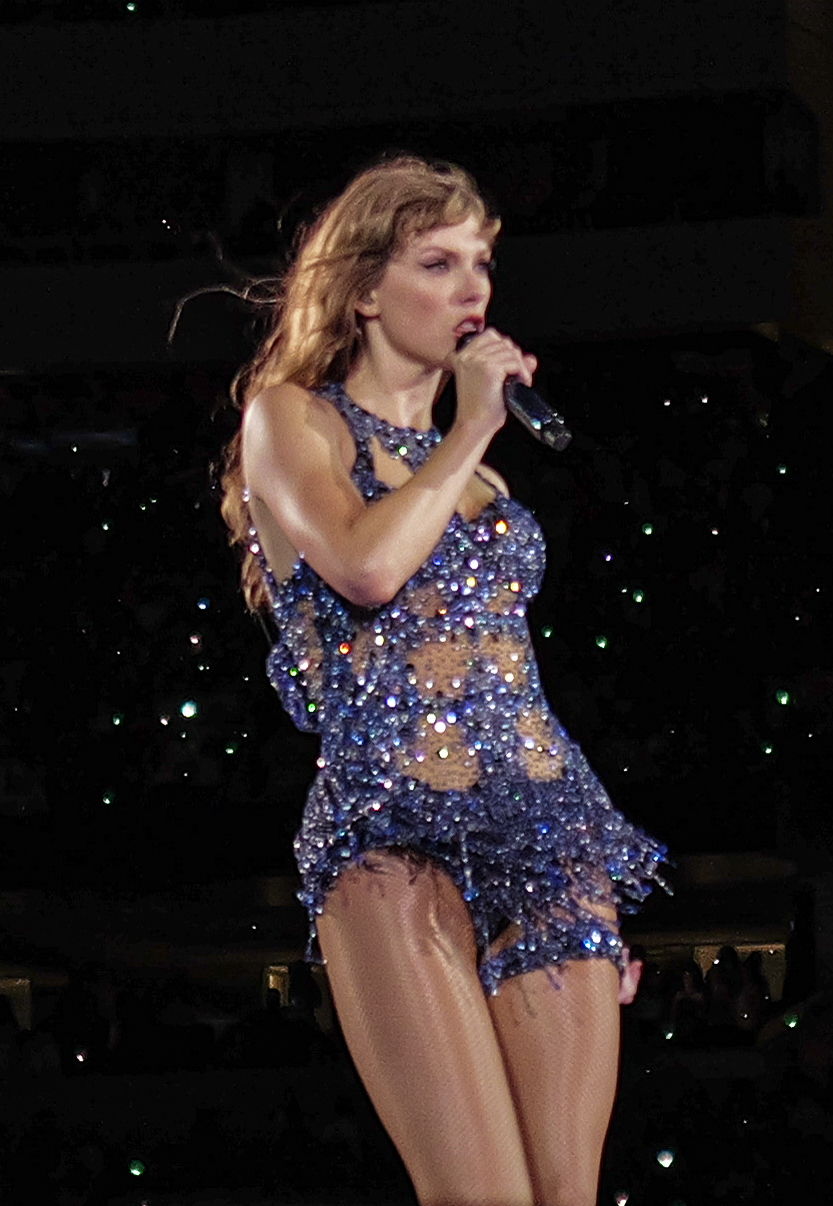
Taylor Swift performed "Maroon" multiple times on the Eras Tour in 2023 and 2024.

Swift performed "Maroon" as a "surprise song" outside the regular set list live ten times on the Eras Tour. She performed it as a standalone number on piano at four shows: East Rutherford, New Jersey (May 26, 2023), Inglewood, California (August 3, 2023), Mexico City (August 27, 2023), and Paris (May 11, 2024). A solo performance of "Maroon" was included in an extended edition of the concert film Taylor Swift: The Eras Tour, released exclusively onto Disney+ on March 14, 2024.

At the other six shows, she performed "Maroon" as part of mashups with her other songs, all on piano: with "Forever & Always" in Sydney (February 26, 2024), with "Cornelia Street" in Liverpool (June 13, 2024), with "The Black Dog" and "Come Back... Be Here in London (June 21, 2024), with "Red" in Warsaw (August 2, 2024), with "Cowboy like Me" in Indianapolis (November 2, 2024), and with "The Tortured Poets Department" in Vancouver (December 7, 2024).

== Personnel ==
Credits are adapted from the liner notes of Midnights.

- Taylor Swift – vocals, songwriting, production
- Jack Antonoff – songwriting, production, engineering, programming, percussion, Juno 6, modular synth, piano, electric guitars, bass, recording
- Evan Smith – engineering, organ, saxophone, flute, clarinet, recording
- Laura Sisk – engineering, recording
- Megan Searl – assistant engineering
- John Sher – assistant engineering
- John Rooney – assistant engineering
- Serban Ghenea – mixing
- Bryce Bordone – assistant mixing
- Randy Merrill – mastering

== Charts ==
Chart performance for "Maroon"
Chart (2022)	Peak position
Argentina Hot 100 (Billboard)	100
Australia (ARIA)	4
Canada Hot 100 (Billboard)	4
Croatia (Billboard)	19
Czech Republic Singles Digital (ČNS IFPI)	27
Denmark (Tracklisten)	34
France (SNEP)	100
Germany (GfK)	96
Global 200 (Billboard)	4
Greece International (IFPI)	9
Hong Kong (Billboard)	22
Hungary (Stream Top 40)	32
Iceland (Tónlistinn)	12
India International Singles (IMI)	13
Italy (FIMI)	77
Lithuania (AGATA)	25
Luxembourg (Billboard)	20
Malaysia (Billboard)	7
Malaysia International (RIM)	5
New Zealand (Recorded Music NZ)	5
Norway (VG-lista)	30
Philippines (Billboard)	4
Portugal (AFP)	11
Singapore (RIAS)	5
Slovakia Airplay (ČNS IFPI)	29
South Africa (RISA)	12
Spain (Promusicae)	49
Sweden (Sverigetopplistan)	26
Swiss Streaming (Schweizer Hitparade)	21
UK Audio Streaming (Official Charts)	6
US Billboard Hot 100	3
Vietnam Hot 100 (Billboard)	11

== Certifications ==
Certifications for "Maroon"
Region	Certification	Certified units/sales
Australia (ARIA)	Platinum	70,000^{‡}
Brazil (Pro-Música Brasil)	Platinum	40,000^{‡}
Canada (Music Canada)	Platinum	80,000^{‡}
New Zealand (RMNZ)	Platinum	30,000^{‡}
United Kingdom (BPI)	Gold	400,000^{‡}
^{‡} Sales+streaming figures based on certification alone.
