= Cassandra (Taylor Swift song) =

Song by Taylor Swift

from the album The Tortured Poets Department: The Anthology
- Released: April 19, 2024
- Studio: Long Pond (Hudson Valley)
- Genre: Folk-pop
- Length: 4:00
- Label: Republic
- Songwriters: Taylor Swift; Aaron Dessner
- Producers: Taylor Swift; Aaron Dessner

Lyric video
- "Cassandra" on YouTube

"Cassandra" is a song by the American singer-songwriter Taylor Swift from the double album extended edition of her eleventh studio album, The Tortured Poets Department: The Anthology (2024). Written and produced by Swift and Aaron Dessner, the song is a haunting folk-pop piano ballad that tells the story of someone who warned others of the truth but was not believed, drawing on the story of the Trojan priestess Cassandra from Greek mythology.

The song received mixed reviews from critics, with some praising the song for its sound and central metaphor, while others found its sound familiar and the metaphor inaccurate. The song peaked at number 44 on the Billboard Global 200, and reached the national charts in Australia, Canada, and the United States. A webstore-exclusive demo recording was temporarily made available as a digital-edition bonus track. Swift performed the song during her Eras Tour (2023-2024) show in Toronto on November 22, 2024 as a mashup with her songs "Mad Woman" (2020) and "I Did Something Bad" (2017).

== Background and release ==
At the 66th Annual Grammy Awards on February 4, 2024, Taylor Swift won the award for Best Pop Vocal Album for Midnights (2022). During her acceptance speech, Swift announced that her eleventh studio album, The Tortured Poets Department, would be released on April 19. She had developed the album over the previous two years, since the completion of Midnights, and continued working on it during the US leg of the Eras Tour. The standard edition of the album was released on April 19, 2024, with sixteen standard tracks and four different bonus tracks released on different vinyl variants. Two hours after, Swift surprise-released an expanded double-album version of The Tortured Poets Department, subtitled The Anthology, with fifteen additional songs, and "Cassandra" included as the 27th track. On May 16, Swift released three limited edition digital webstore-exclusive versions of the album for pre-order, one of which included a first draft demo recording of "Cassandra". Swift performed "Cassandra" during the November 22, 2024 show of the Eras Tour in Toronto, as part of a mashup with her songs "Mad Woman" (2020) and "I Did Something Bad" (2017).

== Composition and lyrics ==
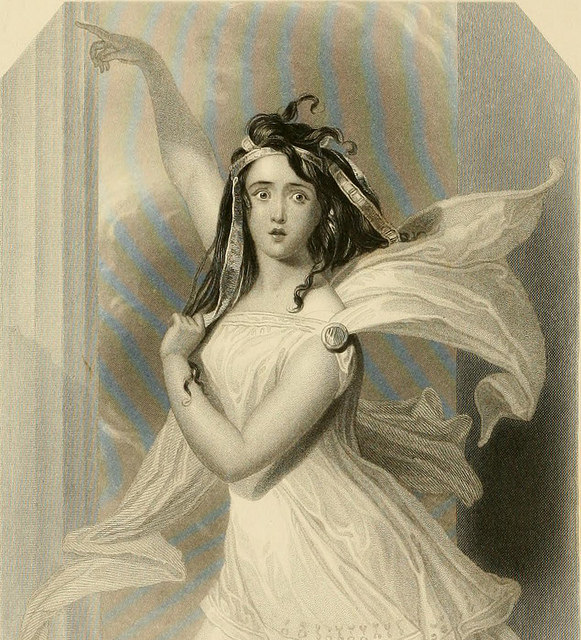
The story of the priestess Cassandra is cited as the inspiration for the song.

Swift wrote and produced "Cassandra" with Aaron Dessner. It is a folk-pop piano ballad featuring "soft-glow piano and strings". Mary Kate Carr of AV Club likened the song sonically to "Mad Woman", from Swift's 2020 surprise album Folklore. "Cassandra" has a duration of four minutes, and is composed in the key of E-flat major for the verses and modulates to the key of G minor for the choruses and outro with a tempo of 140 beats per minute. The time signature alternates between 6/4 in the verses and choruses and 4/4 in the bridge and outro. Swift's vocals range from C3 to G4.

The song's lyrics reference the mythological Greek prophetess Cassandra, the daughter of Priam and Hecuba who has a gift of prophecy, but is cursed by Apollo to never be believed. Swift compares herself to Cassandra, sitting in her jail cell as a mob is "crying out for her blood" and asks if everyone believes her once the truth is revealed, singing: "When the first stone's thrown, there's screaming / In the streets there's a raging riot / When it's 'Burn the bitch,' they're shrieking / When the truth comes out, it's quiet". Swift's version of the character is "vindicated as being correct" but there is a great personal cost, and she does not receive any attention or forgiveness when it is revealed that she was right. "Cassandra" utilizes gothic imagery, such as "crumbling houses and forlorn towers".

According to Jason Lipshutz of Billboard, its lyrics give an insight into the period in Swift's life that led to her album Reputation (2017), when her public feud with the American rapper Kanye West and his then wife, the American media personality Kim Kardashian, turned many against her, with Swift reflecting on "the supposed supporters who didn't take her side." Swift criticizes a money-obsessed family that pursues greed while claiming Christian values, singing "The family, the pure greed, the Christian chorus line / They all said nothing / Blood's thick but nothing like a payroll." Swift also makes reference to people filling her Instagram comments with snake emojis in the lyric "So they filled my cell with snakes, I regret to say / Do you believe me now?" The song has also been linked to Swift's dispute with the American talent manager Scooter Braun over the ownership of her master recordings, with Swift possibly knowing something about Braun that led to many of his clients leaving him in the year prior, connecting to her 2022 song "Vigilante Shit".

== Critical reception ==
"Cassandra" received mixed reviews from music critics. Rob Sheffield of Rolling Stone named "Cassandra" among "the most powerful songs Swift and Dessner have crafted together." John Wohlmacher of Beats Per Minute praised the song as being "genuinely pretty", and Melissa Ruggieri of USA Today praised the song's "pretty piano melodies". In a more negative review, Craig Jenkins of Vulture criticized the central metaphor of the song for being a stretch when comparing the story of Cassandra to the events Swift is alluding to. Carl Wilson of Slate said that the song's idea of Swift being both "Eve and the snake" was emblematic of a problem with her wanting to both criticize reading into the meaning of her songs, while also feeding into this herself. Carr criticized the song as feeling familiar both sonically and lyrically, emblematic of a problem with the album as a whole. Lipshutz ranked "Cassandra" 22nd out of 31 tracks on the album, and Ryan Fish of The Hollywood Reporter ranked it as the worst song on the album.

== Commercial performance ==
Following the release of The Tortured Poets Department: The Anthology, "Cassandra" debuted at number 44 on the Billboard Global 200. In the United States, the song debuted at number 44 on the US Billboard Hot 100, and it also debuted at the same position in Canada. In Australia, the song peaked at number 49 on the ARIA Singles Chart, and with a total of 29 songs charting, made Swift the artist with the most entries in a single week. The song also charted on the United Kingdom's streaming and sales charts, peaking at number 59 and number 78, respectively, Sweden's Heatseeker chart at number 19, and Greece's International Top 100 Digital Singles chart at number 96.

== Credits and personnel ==
Adapted from the liner notes of The Tortured Poets Department: The Anthology

- Recorded at Long Pond Studios, Hudson Valley
- Bryce Dessner's orchestration recorded in Biarritz
- Aaron Dessner's performance recorded at Long Pond Studios, Hudson Valley
- Glenn Kotche's performance recorded at Narwhal Studios, Chicago
- James McAlister's performance recorded at Adventureland Studios, Chicago
- Benjamin Lanz's performance recorded in Paris, France
- London Contemporary Orchestra's performance recorded at AIR Studios, London
- Mixed at Mixstar Studios, Virginia Beach, Virginia
- Mastered at Sterling Sound, Edgewater, New Jersey
- Mastered for vinyl at Sterling Sound, Nashville, Tennessee

=== Musicians ===
- Taylor Swift – vocals, songwriting, production
- Aaron Dessner – production, songwriting, piano, electric guitar, keyboards, percussion, synth bass, synthesizer
- James McAlister – drum machine programing, keyboards, modular synthesizer, percusison, synthesizer
- Glen Kotche – snare drum, vibraphone
- Benjamin Lanz – trombone, modular synthesizer
- Bryce Dessner – orchestration
- London Contemporary Orchestra
  - Conductor – Robert Ames
  - First violin – Eloisa-Fleur Thom (leader), Sophie Mather, Marriane Haynes, Alicia Berendse, Anna de Bruin, Akiko Ishikawa, Nicole Crespo O'Donoghue, Julian Azkoul
  - Second violin – Emily Holland, Kirsty Mangan, Cara Laskaris, Ronald Long, Dan Oates, Iona Allan
  - Viola – Nicholas Bootiman, Matthew Kettle, Amy Swain, Elisa Bergersen, Morgan Goff
  - Cello – Brian O'Kane, Reinoud Ford, Max Ruisi, Abi Hyde-Smith
  - Double bass – Dave Brown, Chris Kelly, Sophie Roper
  - French horn – David McQueen, Paul Cott, Jonathan Farey
  - Percussion – George Barton

=== Technical ===
- Serban Ghenea – mixing
- Bryce Bordone – mix engineering
- Randy Merrill – mastering
- Ryan Smith – mastering for vinyl
- James McAlister – recording engineering
- Benjamin Lanz – recording engineering
- Bella Blasko – recording engineering
- Jeremy Murphy – recording engineering
- Jonathan Low – recording engineering
- Pat Burns – recording engineering
- London Contemporary Orchestra
  - Digital recordist – Gianluca Massimo
  - Copyist – Tristan Noon
  - Recording projects manager – Meg Monteith
  - Orchestra manager – Amy-Elisabeth Hinds

== Charts ==
Chart performance for "Cassandra"
Chart (2024)	Peak position
Australia (ARIA)	49
Canada Hot 100 (Billboard)	44
Global 200 (Billboard)	44
Greece International (IFPI)	96
Sweden Heatseeker (Sverigetopplistan)	19
UK Singles Sales (OCC)	78
UK Streaming (OCC)	59
US Billboard Hot 100	44

== Certifications ==
Certifications for "Cassandra"
Region	Certification	Certified units/sales
Australia (ARIA)	Gold	35,000^{‡}
Brazil (Pro-Música Brasil)	Gold	20,000^{‡}
^{‡} Sales+streaming figures based on certification alone.
