= Mirrorball (song) =

2020 song by Taylor Swift

Song by Taylor Swift

from the album Folklore
- Released: July 24, 2020
- Studio: Kitty Committee (Beverly Hills); Rough Customer (Brooklyn)
- Genre: Dream pop; jangle pop; indie folk; indie rock
- Length: 3:29
- Label: Republic
- Songwriters: Taylor Swift; Jack Antonoff
- Producers: Taylor Swift; Jack Antonoff

Lyric video
- "Mirrorball" on YouTube

"Mirrorball" is a song by the American singer-songwriter Taylor Swift from her eighth studio album, Folklore (2020). She wrote the song as a tribute to her fans, after she cancelled a planned concert tour to support her seventh studio album Lover (2019) due to the COVID-19 pandemic. Produced by Swift and co-writer Jack Antonoff, "Mirrorball" incorporates dream pop, jangle pop, indie folk, and indie rock with flavors of country music, accompanied by reverbed, gentle guitars, vocal harmonies, and live drums. Lyrically, the narrator likens herself to a fragile disco ball and sings about doing anything to keep her audience entertained.

In reviews of Folklore, critics interpreted the track as a metaphor for female musicians' struggles to reinvent themselves to stay relevant. They lauded the production and emotional sentiments. Many picked it as an album highlight and one of Swift's greatest tracks. "Mirrorball" was listed as one of the best songs of 2020 by Slant Magazine, Pitchfork, and Variety. It peaked at number 26 on the US Billboard Hot 100 and was a top 40 chart entry in Australia, Canada, Malaysia, and Singapore. Swift recorded the song for the concert documentary Folklore: The Long Pond Studio Sessions (2020).

== Background and composition ==
The singer-songwriter Taylor Swift began work on her eighth studio album, Folklore, during the COVID-19 pandemic in early 2020. She recruited Jack Antonoff, who had worked on her three previous studio albums, as a producer on the album. Swift wrote and produced four songs with Antonoff, including "Mirrorball". On the track, Antonoff served as co-writer, programmer, and engineer (with Laura Sisk), and played instruments including acoustic guitar, drums, electric guitar, and Hammond B-3. The track was recorded at Kitty Committee Studio (Swift's home studio) in Beverly Hills, California, and Rough Customer Studio in Brooklyn. Serban Ghenea mixed the song at MixStar Studios in Virginia Beach, Virginia.

"Mirrorball"
"Mirrorball" features a production drenched in reverb. It is a dream pop and jangle pop song with dense guitars and vocal harmonies.

"Mirrorball" runs for 3 minutes and 29 seconds. It is a dream pop, jangle pop, and indie rock song with a dense reverb. Jon Caramanica of The New York Times remarked that the production borderlines shoegaze, and Jason Lipshutz from Billboard deemed it an indie folk track. The production incorporates reverbed guitars, a pedal steel, country flavors, breathy vocals, harmonies, and live drums. Swift's vocals are highlighted at the forefront, backed by soft, gentle snare strokes in the background. Spencer Kornharber of The Atlantic wrote that the song features "warm" and "sparkling" guitar tones yet "snowy" tambourine. Mikael Wood from the Los Angeles Times compared the song to the music by such 1990s acts as the Sundays and Sixpence None the Richer for displaying a more feminine side, a counterpart to the album's overarching "beardo indie rock" influence. Willman agreed that "Mirrorball" is one of the album's "least folkloric-sounding tracks".

Whereas much of Folklore explores fictional narratives and departs from Swift's previously well-known autobiographical songwriting, "Mirrorball" is a track that reflects her state of mind during the COVID-19 quarantine. She wrote the track after her planned concert tour for Lover was cancelled on the outbreak of the pandemic. On it, she channeled her realization of how her fans find "solace on the dance floor", and her struggles with celebrity and how to maintain relevance: "It's a metaphor for celebrity, but it’s also a metaphor for so many people who feel like they have to be different versions of themselves for different people." In the lyrics, the narrator sings about how she would do anything to entertain her audience ("All I do is try, try, try I'm still on that trapeze/ I'm still trying everything, to keep you looking at me") and likens herself to a fragile disco ball. Critics interpreted the track to be about Swift's self-awareness of her public image, and about female celebrities' efforts to remain relevant at large.

== Release and live performances ==
Folklore was released on July 24, 2020, via Republic Records. In the track-list, "Mirrorball" sits at number 6 out of the 16 tracks. The track debuted and peaked at number 26 on the United States's Billboard Hot 100. On Hot Rock & Alternative Songs, it entered at number six and stayed for 16 weeks. Outside the US, the song reached the countries of Singapore (13), Australia (14), Malaysia (14), Canada (22), and Portugal (103). In the United Kingdom, "Mirrorball" reached number 30 on the OCC's Audio Streaming Chart and was certified gold by the British Phonographic Industry (BPI).

After the album's release, Swift recorded a stripped-down rendition of "Mirrorball" for the Disney+ concert documentary Folklore: The Long Pond Studio Sessions and its live album on November 25, 2020. On March 17, 2023, Swift embarked on her sixth concert tour, the Eras Tour, which contained a segment of "surprise songs" where she performed random songs from her discography. At the tour's opening show in Glendale, Arizona, Swift sang "Mirrorball" as the tour's first "surprise song". She performed the song three more times on the tour as part of mashups: with "Epiphany" on piano in Singapore, with "Clara Bow" on guitar in Warsaw and with "Guilty as Sin?" on piano in Miami.

== Critical reception ==
In publications' reviews of Folklore, many critics lauded the production and emotional resonance of "Mirrorball". They picked it as an album highlight (Note: Attributed to Giselle Au Nhien-Nguyen of The Sydney Morning Herald, Jason Lipshutz of Billboard, Eric Mason of Slant Magazine, and Roisin O'Connor of The Independent) or even the best album track. (Note: Attributed to Mikael Wood of the Los Angeles Times and Rob Harvilla of The Ringer) Finn McRedmond of The Irish Times said the song was "destined to be an instant Swiftian classic". Descriptions of Swift's songwriting include "dreamy", "devastatingly pretty", "ethereal", and "authentic". In Slant Magazine, Eric Mason admired how "Mirrorball" managed to convey both nostalgia and sarcasm with "breathless amazement". Hannah Mylrea of NME was not as impressed; she deemed the track forgettable and said it dragged the album. "Mirrorball" appeared on year-end lists of the best songs of 2020 by Variety's Chris Willman, who placed it at number nine on a list of 40 songs, Pitchfork (71st), and Slant Magazine (14th).

Retrospectively, critics have considered "Mirrorball" as one of Swift's greatest tracks. In rankings of Swift's entire catalog, Willman and Rob Sheffield from Rolling Stone listed it among Swift's five best songs. In 2022 reviews, Spencer Kornhaber from The Atlantic said that "Mirrorball" was one of the tracks that "both fit in and stood out" on Folklore and selected it as one of her finest, most distinct works, and Katherine Flynn of Consequence insisted that "Mirrorball" should have been the lead single from the album and lauded its bridge as "undeniable". In 2025, Swift stated on The Late Show With Stephen Colbert that she considers "Mirrorball" one of her five best songs.

== Personnel ==
Credits are adapted from the liner notes of Folklore.

- Taylor Swift – lead vocals, songwriting, production
- Jack Antonoff – production, songwriting, recording, programming, acoustic guitar, drums, electric guitar, Hammond B-3, keyboards, percussion, sleigh bells, background vocals
- Laura Sisk – recording
- John Hanes – engineering
- Serban Ghenea – mixing

== Charts ==
Weekly chart performance for "Mirrorball"
Chart (2020)	Peak position
Australia (ARIA)	14
Canada Hot 100 (Billboard)	22
Malaysia (RIM)	14
Portugal (AFP)	103
Singapore (RIAS)	13
Sweden Heatseekers (Sverigetopplistan)	6
UK Audio Streaming (Official Charts)	30
US Billboard Hot 100	26
US Hot Rock & Alternative Songs (Billboard)	6

Year-end chart performance for "Mirrorball"
Chart (2020)	Position
US Hot Rock & Alternative Songs (Billboard)	34

== Certifications ==
Certifications for "Mirrorball"
Region	Certification	Certified units/sales
Australia (ARIA)	2× Platinum	140,000^{‡}
Brazil (Pro-Música Brasil)	Platinum	40,000^{‡}
New Zealand (RMNZ)	Platinum	30,000^{‡}
United Kingdom (BPI)	Gold	400,000^{‡}
^{‡} Sales+streaming figures based on certification alone.
