= Clara Bow (song) =

2024 song by Taylor Swift

Song by Taylor Swift

from the album The Tortured Poets Department
- Released: April 19, 2024
- Studio: Long Pond (New York)
- Genre: Chamber pop; pop rock
- Length: 3:36
- Label: Republic
- Songwriters: Taylor Swift; Aaron Dessner
- Producers: Taylor Swift; Aaron Dessner

Lyric video
- "Clara Bow" on YouTube

"Clara Bow" is a song by the American singer-songwriter Taylor Swift from her eleventh studio album, The Tortured Poets Department (2024). Produced by Swift and Aaron Dessner, "Clara Bow" is a chamber pop and pop rock song instrumented with guitars, a deep bass, and minimalist orchestral strings. Titled after the 1920s actress Clara Bow, the song references Bow, the singer-songwriter Stevie Nicks, and Swift herself to serve as a commentary on how women are treated in the entertainment industry, the pertaining gender and power dynamics, and Swift's own fame and legacy.

Critics generally applauded "Clara Bow" for its vulnerable lyricism that depicts the pressures of fame and beauty on women; Bow's family, as well as her biographer David Stenn, also received the song with appreciation. NPR picked it as one of the best songs of 2024. The track peaked at number 22 of the Billboard Global 200 chart and reached the top 25 in Australia, Canada, New Zealand, Singapore, and the United States, and it has received a gold certification in Australia. Swift performed "Clara Bow" live twice on the Eras Tour in 2024.

== Background and release ==
Taylor Swift conceived her eleventh studio album, The Tortured Poets Department, in 2022 and 2023, amidst her heightened fame brought by the widely successful Eras Tour and publicized romantic affairs. She reflected on it as a "lifeline" that made her realize the importance of songwriting to her life more than ever, describing the album as one that she "really needed" to make. Republic Records released The Tortured Poets Department on April 19, 2024. "Clara Bow" is track number 16, the closing track of the album's standard edition.

Swift performed "Clara Bow" on the Eras Tour twice in 2024. At the June 30 show in Dublin, she sang a mashup of "Clara Bow" and "The Lucky One" (2012) on acoustic guitar, dedicating it to the singer-songwriter Stevie Nicks, who was present in the audience and referenced in the song's lyrics. She performed "Clara Bow" again, this time as part of a mashup with "Mirrorball" (2020), at the August 1 show in Warsaw.

== Music and lyrics ==
Swift wrote and produced "Clara Bow" with Aaron Dessner. Bella Blasko and Jonathan Low recorded the song at Dessner's Long Pond Studios in New York. The track was mixed by Serban Ghenea at MixStar Studios in Virginia Beach. Musically, the track is a chamber pop and pop rock song instrumented by stark bass and a minimalist string arrangement performed by the London Contemporary Orchestra, conducted by Robert Ames, consisting of 15 violinists, five violists, four cellists, and three double bassists. Their performance was recorded by Jeremy Murphy at AIR Studios in London. Ed Power of The i Paper described the sound as "stadium indie" and the opening riff as "Radiohead-esque". For Cosmopolitan's Samantha Olson, the track was reminiscent of a Lucy Dacus song.

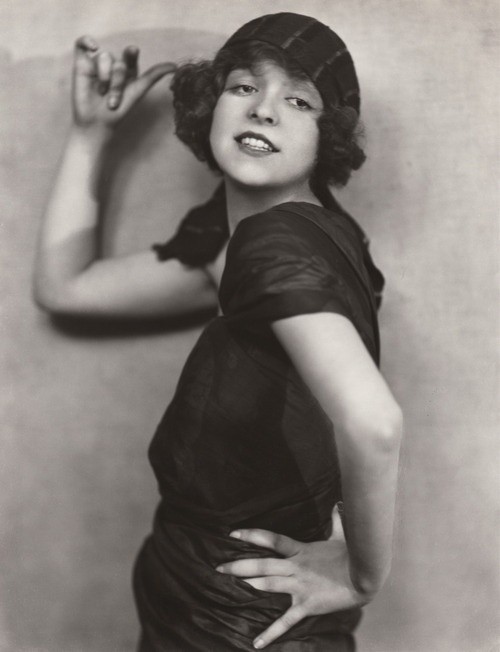
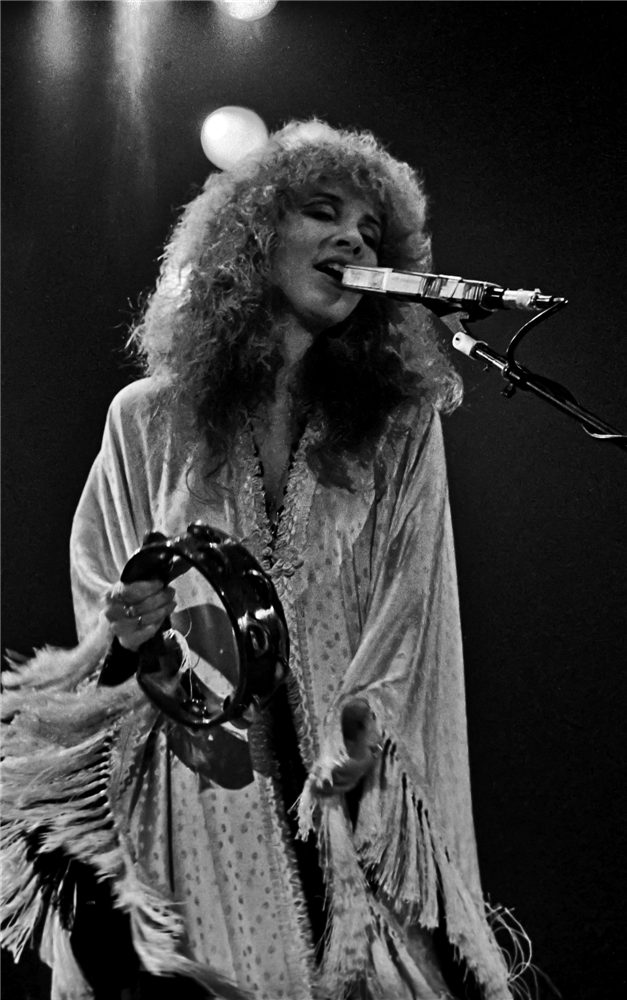
The song's namesake is the actress Clara Bow (left) and the lyrics additionally reference the singer-songwriter Stevie Nicks (right).

The track is titled after and references the 1920s silent film actress Clara Bow, and additionally references the singer-songwriter Stevie Nicks and Swift herself. Explaining the namedrops, Swift said that she "picked women who have done great things in the past and have been these archetypes of greatness in the entertainment industry". Commenting on the overall theme, Swift said that she was inspired by her conversations with record label executives, who would often tell stories of how new and coming female artists were treated as "the new replacement" for former stars.

In the lyrics, the record label executives—depicted as men in suits in Los Angeles—tell the narrator, a small-town girl who aspires to become famous, that she resembles "Clara Bow in this light" and "Stevie Nicks in '75". They promise her that she would be "dazzling", describing her as "the new god we're worshiping". The narrator is fully aware that those executives would not care if she becomes obscure one day and of her own conformity to fame, "Beauty is a beast that roars / Down on all fours / Demanding more."

In the final verse, the lyrics reference Swift herself: "You look like Taylor Swift in this light / We're loving it / You've got edge / She never did." These receive interpretations as Swift's self-awareness of the cyclical nature of fame and her own status and journey from a small-town girl to a global star or her fear that she would be replaced too and message to aspiring female musicians that came after her. According to the literary critic Stephanie Burt, "Clara Bow" represents the album's major theme of "pressure and fame and Swift's own need to perform". For Rob Sheffield of Rolling Stone, "Clara Bow" thematically resembles Swift's previous songs like "The Lucky One" (2012) and "Nothing New", which are about short-lived fame and being left behind. NPR's Ann Powers thought that the song further details the impact of fame on Swift, a theme that she had explored on Reputation (2017) and in "Anti-Hero" (2022).

== Reception and commentary ==
Prior to the album release, Bow's family said they hoped the song would encapsulate her legacy. According to Bow's great-granddaughter and son, Swift's team had not contacted the family prior to the release of the track, and that they were both shocked and fascinated by it. After the release of the song, Bow's family appreciated it as "hauntingly beautiful" and specifically praised the lyric, "This town is fake but you're the real thing", contending that Swift's song was a success in portraying Bow's legacy and impact. Clara Bow biographer David Stenn also praised Swift's song, describing the lyrics "beauty is a beast that roars down on all fours" as "poetry" and "profound".

Music reviews of The Tortured Poets Department also regarded "Clara Bow" with praise. Many complimented the lyricism as self-aware and vulnerable: Dakota West Foss from Sputnikmusic remarked that the song concluded the album "with intriguing and, more importantly, genuine self-reflection that examines the weight of her crown". Sheffield lauded it as a "killer finale" and highlighted the lyrics, commenting that they were about not only fame and show business but also the lingering emotional impact of something that had happened a long time ago. Maria Sherman of the Associated Press argued that "Clara Bow" deserved to become one of Swift's greatest album closers, highlighting how the final lines ("You look like Taylor Swift in this light") could be interpreted as either self-deprecation or self-awareness, bringing forth a haunting quality.

Some reviews suggested that the song was autobiographical in nature, but it also incorporated self-mythologizing. The film critic Stephanie Zacharek lauded how Swift's writing contained phrasing that is "bell-like in its clarity" and contended that "the melody has a halting naivete, like a nursery rhyme". Zacharek added that although Swift was not intimately familiar with Bow's personal life, she was successful in creating a song about the mechanisms of fame through a study of her character and biography. According to Vogue France's Lolita Mang, the song's final lines demonstrated Swift's self-awareness of her iconic status and legacy, as well as her determination to define herself on her own terms through songwriting. The Ringer's Nora Princiotti found it fascinating that in "Clara Bow", Swift wrote not only about her real personality but also about "Taylor Swift the performance", demonstrating her role as an unreliable narrator ("This town is fake, but you're the real thing").

Other reviews also praised the production and orchestration. Burt contended that "Clara Bow" featured different textures and instrumental timbres than Swift's previous songs. Beats Per Minute's John Wohlmacher praised the "gorgeous melody and urgent pre-chorus", and Les Inrockuptibles' Sophie Rosement described the string arrangement as "superb". Olsen deemed it one of the album's best five tracks, saying that both the lyrics and production contained "a shock factor", especially in how "Swift allows the music to speak for itself". Billboard's Jason Lipshutz placed "Clara Bow" at number 15 on his ranking of all 31 tracks from the double album edition of The Tortured Poets Department, highlighting the "careful pop rock" production and Swift's breathy vocals. Mary Siroky of Consequence regarded the song as the album's "clear highlight", praising how the minimal production allowed the listener to emerge in the narrative lyrics: "It's enough to be moved to tears when the time is taken to sit and revel in the story." Powers described the song as a "lovely minuet" and highlighted how it "ends abruptly", which captured anxiety that evoked the ending scene of the film All About Eve. NPR featured "Clara Bow" in their selection "124 Best Songs of 2024"; Powers praised the orchestration as show-stopping and dazzling.

== Commercial performance ==
"Clara Bow" debuted at peaked at number 22 on the Billboard Global 200 chart. In the United States, the track debuted and peaked at number 21 on the Billboard Hot 100. It was one of the 32 tracks that Swift had on the Hot 100 chart that week, setting the record for the most simultaneous chart entries for a female artist. In Australia, the song debuted at number 20 on the ARIA Singles Chart and has received a gold certification; together with other tracks from The Tortured Poets Department, it made Swift the artist with the most entries in a single week, with 29. Elsewhere, "Clara Bow" charted within the top 25 on the charts in New Zealand (22), Singapore (22), and Canada (23).

== Credits and personnel ==
Credits are adapted from the liner notes of The Tortured Poets Department.

Recording locations

- Recorded at Long Pond Studio, New York
- London Contemporary Orchestra's performance recorded at AIR Studios, London
- Glenn Kotche's performance recorded at Narwhal Studios, Chicago
- Thomas Bartlett's performance recorded at The Dwelling, New York
- Mixed at MixStar Studios, Virginia Beach

Personnel

- Taylor Swift – vocals, songwriter, producer
- Aaron Dessner – producer, songwriter, piano, synthesizer, percussion, bass, drum programming
- Glenn Kotche – drums, percussion
- James McAlister – engineering, synthesizer, percussion, keyboards
- J.T. Bates – drums
- Thomas Bartlett – engineering, synthesizer, keyboards, piano
- Robert Ames – conductor
- Abi Hyde-Smith – cello
- Brian O'Kane – cello
- Max Ruisi – cello
- Reinoud Ford – cello
- Chris Kelly – double bass
- Dave Brown – double bass
- Sophie Roper – double bass
- Elisa Bergersen – viola
- Matthew Kettle – viola
- Morgan Goff – viola
- Nicholas Bootiman – viola
- Amy Swain – viola
- Akiko Ishikawa – violin
- Cara Laskaris – violin
- Iona Allan – violin
- Kirsty Mangan – violin
- Nicole Crespo O'Donoghue – violin
- Ronald Long – violin
- Sophie Mather – violin
- Dan Oates – violin
- Eloisa-Fleur Thorn – violin
- Emily Holland – violin
- Anna de Bruin – violin
- Galya Bisengalieva – violin
- Agata Daraskaite – violin
- Jlian Azkoul – violin
- Marianne Haynes – violin
- Serban Ghenea – mixing
- Bryce Bordone – mix engineer
- Jonathan Low – engineering
- Jeremy Murphy – engineering
- Bryce Dessner – recording arrangement
- Bella Blasko – additional engineering
- Laura Beck – engineering assistance
- Randy Merrill – mastering
- Ryan Smith – mastering

== Charts ==
Chart (2024)	Peak position
Australia (ARIA)	20
Canada Hot 100 (Billboard)	23
France (SNEP)	191
Global 200 (Billboard)	22
Greece International (IFPI)	48
New Zealand (Recorded Music NZ)	22
Portugal (AFP)	56
Singapore (RIAS)	22
Sweden (Sverigetopplistan)	78
Swiss Streaming (Schweizer Hitparade)	60
UK Streaming (OCC)	26
US Billboard Hot 100	21

== Certifications ==
Certifications for "Clara Bow"
Region	Certification	Certified units/sales
Australia (ARIA)	Gold	35,000^{‡}
Brazil (Pro-Música Brasil)	Platinum	40,000^{‡}
^{‡} Sales+streaming figures based on certification alone.
