= Epiphany (Taylor Swift song) =

2020 song by Taylor Swift

Song by Taylor Swift

from the album Folklore
- Released: July 24, 2020
- Studio: Long Pond (New York)
- Genre: Ambient; chamber pop
- Length: 4:49
- Label: Republic
- Songwriters: Taylor Swift; Aaron Dessner
- Producer: Aaron Dessner

Lyric video
- "Epiphany" on YouTube

"Epiphany" is a song by the American singer-songwriter Taylor Swift from her eighth studio album, Folklore (2020). She wrote the track with its producer, Aaron Dessner. An ambient and chamber pop song, "Epiphany" consists of a slow piano line, cinematic strings, and howling brass. The lyrics reflect upon the devastation caused by the COVID-19 pandemic and are a homage to healthcare workers during the pandemic.

"Epiphany" received favorable comments from many music critics, who praised the song's sentiments and themes as well as Swift's vocals, but some found the slow pace and production drowsy. Commercially, "Epiphany" reached the top 50 of several national charts, including in Australia, Canada, and Singapore, and peaked at number 57 on the Billboard Hot 100 in the United States. It was certified platinum in Australia, gold in Brazil and New Zealand, and silver in the United Kingdom.

== Background and release ==
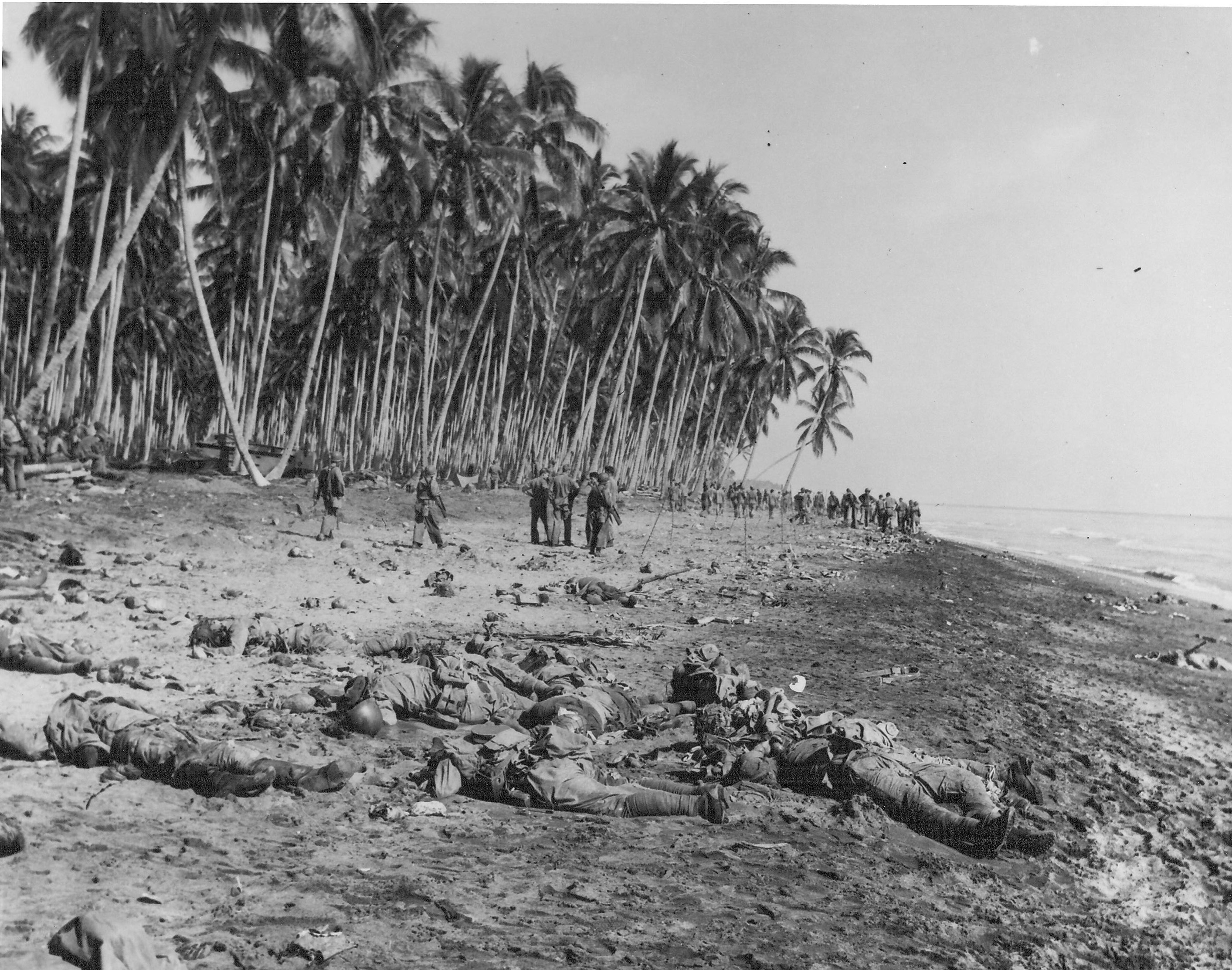
In "Epiphany", Swift mentions wounded and traumatized soldiers crawling up the beaches of Guadalcanal during World War II.

Folklore was conceived by Swift as figments of mythopoeic visuals in her mind, a result of her imagination "running wild" while isolating herself during the COVID-19 pandemic. One such visual was of her paternal grandfather Dean, who fought at the Battle of Guadalcanal, an American military campaign against the Empire of Japan, fought between August 7, 1942 and February 9, 1943 in World War II. These concepts formed the central idea of "Epiphany".

[Dean] never talked about it, not with his sons, not with his wife. Nobody got to hear about what happened there. So I tried to imagine what would happen in order to make you never be able to speak about something. I realized that there are people right now taking a 20-minute break between shifts at a hospital who are having this trauma happen to them that they will probably never want to speak about. I just thought, this is an opportunity to maybe tell those stories.

— Swift on the song's inspiration, Vogue

Swift penned "Epiphany", while Aaron Dessner composed its instrumentals and produced the song. On July 23, 2020, Swift announced Folklore and revealed its track listing where "Epiphany" placed at number 13. The album was released on July 24, 2020. As a reference to the song, a picture of Dean is also featured in the music video for the album's second track and lead single, "Cardigan".

== Composition and lyrics ==
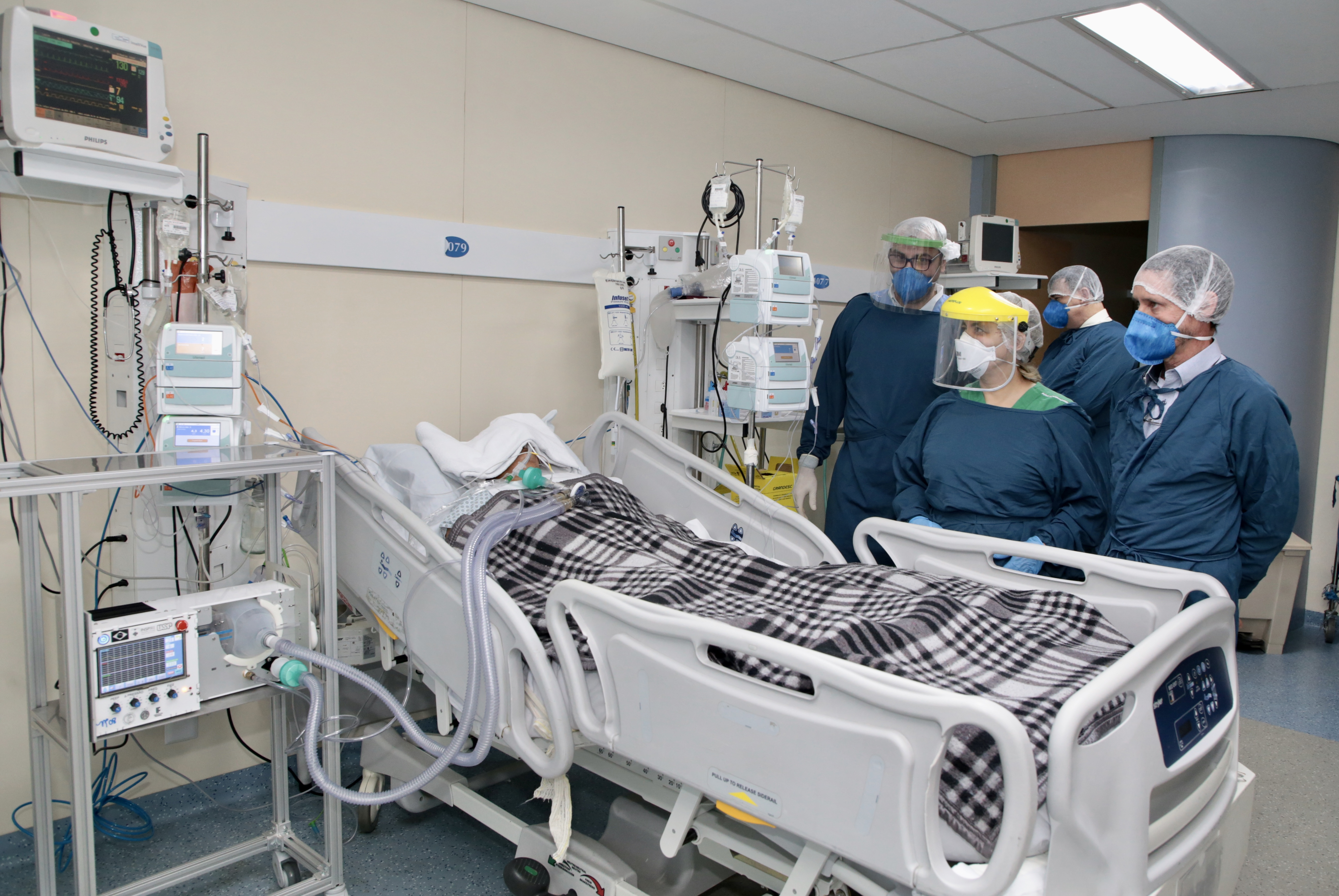
The song is a homage to healthcare workers and their selfless services during the COVID-19 pandemic.

To me, it's like a nurse, doctor, or medical professional, where med school doesn't fully prepare you for seeing someone pass away or just the difficult emotional things that you'll encounter in your job. In the past, heroes were just soldiers. Now they're also medical professionals. To me, that's the underlying mission of the song. There are some things that you see that are hard to talk about. You can't talk about it. You just bear witness to them.

— Dessner on the lyricism of "Epiphany", Vulture

"Epiphany" is an ambient and chamber-pop tune set to a glacial piano, a howling brass and orchestrals. Dessner stated that he imagined "glacial, Icelandic sounds with distended chords and this almost classical feeling" when Swift described the idea of the sound she wanted for "Epiphany." Therefore, Dessner slowed down compositions from different instruments and reversed them to create a "giant stack of harmony," and added piano for a cinematic trope.

Melodically, "Epiphany" is a hymn, displaying Swift's reverent and "angelic" vocals. A homage to healthcare workers during the COVID-19 pandemic, the song's lyrics describe the devastation caused by the pandemic, while deeming doctors and nurses as soldiers on beaches, correlating their emotional distress to that of her veteran grandfather Dean at the Battle of Guadalcanal. In the first verse, Swift sings of Dean on the 1942 battlefield, attending to a soldier bleeding out. In the second verse, she switches to a 2020 medical ward which has patients breathing with difficulty and nurses attending to faltering patients. Swift parallels the pressure both sets of workers endure as they help patients and serve their country while experiencing trauma and witnessing death, and having to reconcile with that to continue serving. The bridge and outro also mention how both workers get "only 20 minutes to sleep" and yet "dream of some epiphany."

== Critical reception ==
"Epiphany" received generally positive reviews from music critics. Sarah Carson, reviewing for I, deemed "Epiphany" a "spectral" track that immortalizes the COVID-19 pandemic. Maura Johnston of Entertainment Weekly also called it spectral, writing that the song is driven by "Swift's exploration of others' inner worlds", which allows her to "take on new voices". The Atlantic writer Spencer Kornhaber dubbed Swift's vocals in the song a "translucent beam", with her syllables falling "slowly like ash". He added that a song like "Epiphany" should not work for "a woman of great privilege" like Swift, who connects two traumas that "aren't her own", but it does work because she "writes with a care and empathy that feel almost priestly". Writing for Slate, Carl Wilson summarized "Epiphany" as a "narratively striking", "topical song" that starts with the image of "an army storming a beach" and then shifts to a modern operating room, where "a woman's vital signs are crashing as someone holds her hand through plastic shielding"; Wilson added that Swift describes these scenes in "warm measured syllables" similar to Kate Bush's 1989 song "This Woman's Work". Annie Zaleski of The A. V. Club wrote that the composition of "Epiphany" echoes the "glacial piano work" by Canadian musician Sarah McLachlan, while the New York Times' Jon Caramanica compared it to works by the Irish singer Enya.

Kitty Empire of The Observer favored the song's sombre lyricism but disliked the "pillowy" instrumentation. She stated that "Epiphany" incorporates "a medical subplot chiming gently with the suffering being wreaked by coronavirus", dotted with Swift's "emphatic yelps", but its music is a "miasma of gingerly fingered piano and consolatory tonalities", resulting in an unmemorable track. Insider reviewers Callie Ahlgrim and Courteney Larocca named "Epiphany" as their least favorite track on Folklore. Ahlgrim opined that the track contains intriguing vocals and lyrics, but is a "bit snoozy, and a bit too long", while Courteney Larocca complimented its "pretty background music", but downplayed it as "a war drama in song format". However, they agreed that "Epiphany" showcases the versatility in Swift's writing. Katie Moulton, writing for Consequence of Sound, said that "Epiphany" seems to try to "connect periods of global and American crisis, from World War II to COVID-19", but felt that the idea is "muddled". She, however, picked the lyric "Hold your hand through plastic now" as a standout. NME critic Hannah Mylrea found the song "slightly sluggish".

== Commercial performance ==
Upon the release of Folklore, "Epiphany" debuted at number 57 on the US Billboard Hot 100 chart, number 11 on the Hot Rock & Alternative Songs, and number 24 on the Rolling Stone Top 100. The song further reached the number 29 on Australia's ARIA Singles Chart, number 27 in Singapore's Singles chart, and number 44 on the Canadian Hot 100.

== Credits and personnel ==
Credits are adapted from the liner notes of Folklore.

Studios

- Recorded at Long Pond Studios, New York
- Swift's vocals recorded at Kitty Committee Studio, Los Angeles
- Mixed at MixStar Studios, Virginia Beach, Virginia

Personnel

- Taylor Swift – vocals, songwriting
- Aaron Dessner – songwriting, production, recording, piano, Mellotron, synthesizers, electric guitar
- Bryce Dessner – orchestration
- Dave Nelson – trombone, recording
- Benjamin Lainz – recording
- Yuki Numata Resnick – viola, violin
- Kyle Resnick – trumpet, recording
- Clarice Jensen – cello, recording
- JT Bates – drums, recording
- Jonathan Low – recording
- Laura Sisk – vocal recording
- Serban Ghenea – mixing
- Randy Merrill – mastering
- John Hanes – engineering

== Charts ==
=== Weekly charts ===
Weekly chart performance for "Epiphany"
Chart (2020)	Peak position
Australia (ARIA)	29
Canada Hot 100 (Billboard)	44
Portugal (AFP)	181
Singapore (RIAS)	27
UK Audio Streaming (Official Charts)	58
US Billboard Hot 100	57
US Hot Rock & Alternative Songs (Billboard)	11
US Rolling Stone Top 100	24

=== Year-end charts ===
Year-end chart performance for "Epiphany"
Chart (2020)	Position
US Hot Rock & Alternative Songs (Billboard)	54

== Certifications ==
Certifications for "Epiphany"
Region	Certification	Certified units/sales
Australia (ARIA)	Platinum	70,000^{‡}
Brazil (Pro-Música Brasil)	Gold	20,000^{‡}
New Zealand (RMNZ)	Gold	15,000^{‡}
United Kingdom (BPI)	Silver	200,000^{‡}
^{‡} Sales+streaming figures based on certification alone.

== See also ==
- "Marjorie" – a 2020 Swift song about her maternal grandmother
