= Folklore (Taylor Swift album) =

- Standard edition cover

Studio album by Taylor Swift
- Released: July 24, 2020
- Recorded: 2020
- Studios: Conway Recording (Los Angeles); Kitty Committee (Los Angeles); Electric Lady (New York City); Long Pond (Hudson Valley); Rough Customer (Brooklyn)
- Genres: Chamber pop; indie folk; electro-folk; folk rock; indie rock
- Length: 63:29
- Label: Republic
- Producers: Aaron Dessner; Jack Antonoff; Taylor Swift; Joe Alwyn

Taylor Swift chronology
Live from Clear Channel Stripped 2008 (2020)	Folklore (2020)	Folklore: The Long Pond Studio Sessions (2020)

Singles from Folklore
- 1. "Cardigan" Released: July 27, 2020; 2. "Exile" Released: August 3, 2020; 3. "Betty" Released: August 17, 2020

Folklore (stylized in all lowercase) is the eighth studio album by the American singer-songwriter Taylor Swift. It was surprise-released on July 24, 2020, through Republic Records. Conceived during quarantine in early 2020, amidst the COVID-19 pandemic, the album explores themes of escapism, nostalgia, and romanticism. Swift recorded her vocals in her Los Angeles home studio and worked virtually with the producers Aaron Dessner and Jack Antonoff, who operated from their studios in the Hudson Valley and New York City.

Using a set of characters and story arcs to depict fictional narratives, the album departs from the autobiographical songwriting that had characterized Swift's past albums. Experimenting with new musical styles, Folklore consists of mellow ballads driven by piano, strings, orchestration, and muted percussion. Music critics classified the genre into various styles of folk, pop, and indie, namely chamber pop, indie folk, electro-folk, folk rock, and indie rock. The album's title was inspired by the lasting legacy of folktales, and its visual aesthetic adopts cottagecore.

Folklore was accompanied by the concert documentary Folklore: The Long Pond Studio Sessions, featuring Swift's commentary and performances. The album topped the charts in Australasia and various European countries and was certified platinum or higher in Australia, Austria, Denmark, France, Germany, Italy, New Zealand, Norway, Poland, Portugal, and the United Kingdom. In the United States, it spent eight weeks atop the Billboard 200, was the best-selling album of 2020, and was certified six-times platinum by the Recording Industry Association of America. Three songs, "Cardigan", "The 1", and "Exile" featuring Bon Iver, reached the top 10 on international singles charts, with "Cardigan" peaking at number one on the Billboard Hot 100.

Folklore received widespread critical acclaim for its emotional weight and intricate lyricism; some journalists commented that its introspective tone was timely for the pandemic, and they regarded its sound as a bold reinvention of Swift's artistry. Many publications featured the album on their 2020 year-end rankings, and Rolling Stone included it in their 2023 revision of their "500 Greatest Albums of All Time" list. Folklore won Album of the Year at the 63rd Annual Grammy Awards, making Swift the first woman to win the award three times. The album informed the concept of Swift's next record, Evermore (2020), and has inspired other artists' works.

== Background ==
In April 2020, Taylor Swift was set to embark on Lover Fest, a concert tour in support of her seventh studio album Lover (2019), which was cancelled following the COVID-19 pandemic. On July 23, 2020, nine photos were uploaded to Swift's Instagram account, all without captions, forming a black and white image of her standing alone in a forest. Subsequently, Swift made another post across all her social media accounts, announcing that her eighth studio album would be released at midnight; Swift stated: "Most of the things I had planned this summer didn't end up happening, but there is something I hadn't planned on that DID happen. And that thing is my 8th studio album, Folklore". She confirmed the image as the album's cover artwork and revealed the track list. The Wall Street Journal opined that the surprise announcement "caught fans and the music business off-guard". Billboard stated that it "blindsided the pop music world", arriving as "exciting news" during lockdown. Folklore was released eleven months after Lover—the fastest turnaround for a Swift studio album at the time, beating the one year and nine-month gap between Reputation (2017) and Lover. In another post, Swift announced that the music video for the track "Cardigan" would be released at the same time as the album.

During the YouTube premiere countdown to the "Cardigan" music video, Swift hinted that the album lyrics contained many of her signature Easter eggs: "One thing I did purposely on this album was put the Easter eggs in the lyrics, more than just the videos. I created character arcs and recurring themes that map out who is singing about who... For example, there's a collection of three songs I refer to as the Teenage Love Triangle. These three songs explore a love triangle from all three people's perspectives at different times in their lives". She referred to the album as "wistful and full of escapism. Sad, beautiful, tragic. Like a photo album full of imagery, and all the stories behind that imagery", described "Cardigan" as a song that explores "lost romance and why young love is often fixed so permanently in our memories," and identified the self-written track, "My Tears Ricochet", as the first song she wrote for the album. Uproxx narrated, "on Thursday night, that hand-drawn 'T' and 'S' could be seen up and down the timeline. Music fans and critics across genres unveiled hot takes, quoted lyrics like Myspace teens writing on the back of textbooks or crafting the perfect AIM away message, and debated Folklore's place in the unimpeachable Taylor Swift canon."

== Conception ==
Swift did not expect to create an album in early 2020. After the cancellation of Lover Fest, Swift quarantined herself, during which she watched numerous films and shows, such as Rear Window (1954), L.A. Confidential (1997), Pan's Labyrinth (2006), Jane Eyre (2011), Marriage Story (2019), and The Last Dance (2020), and read more books than she ever did, books that "dealt with times past, a world that doesn't exist anymore", such as Rebecca (1938) by Daphne du Maurier. The fictions inspired Swift to venture beyond her usual autobiographical style of songwriting and experiment with different narrative standpoints. In isolation during the lockdown, she let her imagination "run wild", ensuing in a set of imagery and visuals that consequently became Folklore.

It started with imagery. Visuals that popped into my mind and piqued my curiosity. Stars drawn around scars. A cardigan that still bears the scent of loss twenty years later. Battleships sinking into the ocean, down, down, down. The tree swing in the woods of my childhood. Hushed tones of "let's run away" and never doing it. The sun drenched month of August, sipped away like a bottle of wine. A mirrored disco ball hovering above a dance floor. A whiskey bottle beckoning. Hands held through plastic. A single thread that, for better or for worse, ties you to your fate. Pretty soon these images in my head grew faces or names and became characters. I found myself not only writing my own stories, but also writing about or from the perspective of people I've never met, people I've known, or those I wish I hadn't.

— Swift on developing Folklore, Billboard

Some of the imagery the singer developed includes: "An exiled man walking the bluffs of a land that isn't his own, wondering how it all went so terribly, terribly wrong. An embittered tormentor showing up at the funeral of his fallen object of obsession. A seventeen-year-old standing on a porch, learning to apologize. Lovestruck kids wandering up and down the evergreen High Line. My grandfather, Dean, landing at Guadalcanal in 1942. A misfit widow getting gleeful revenge on the town that cast her out". Swift "poured all of [her] whims, dreams, fears, and musings" into the songs, and reached out to her "musical heroes" to collaborate with. She initially planned to release Folklore in early 2021, but it "ended up being done" sooner, and released in July 2020 without giving it second thoughts. She approached the album's creation without subjecting herself to any rules, and explained that she "used to put all these parameters on [herself], like, "How will this song sound in a stadium? How will this song sound on radio?" If you take away all the parameters, what do you make? And I guess the answer is Folklore."

== Writing and recording ==
Swift's songwriting drifted towards escapism and romanticism for Folklore. She enlisted two producers to achieve her desired sound—her longtime collaborator, Jack Antonoff, who worked with her on 1989 (2014), Reputation, and Lover, and first-time collaborator Aaron Dessner, guitarist of the American indie rock band the National. Due to COVID-19 concerns, Swift, Antonoff, and Dessner quarantined remotely, separate from each other, creating Folklore by continually exchanging digital files of instrumentals and vocals. The album ensued from a DIY process, mixed and engineered by personnel scattered across the US.

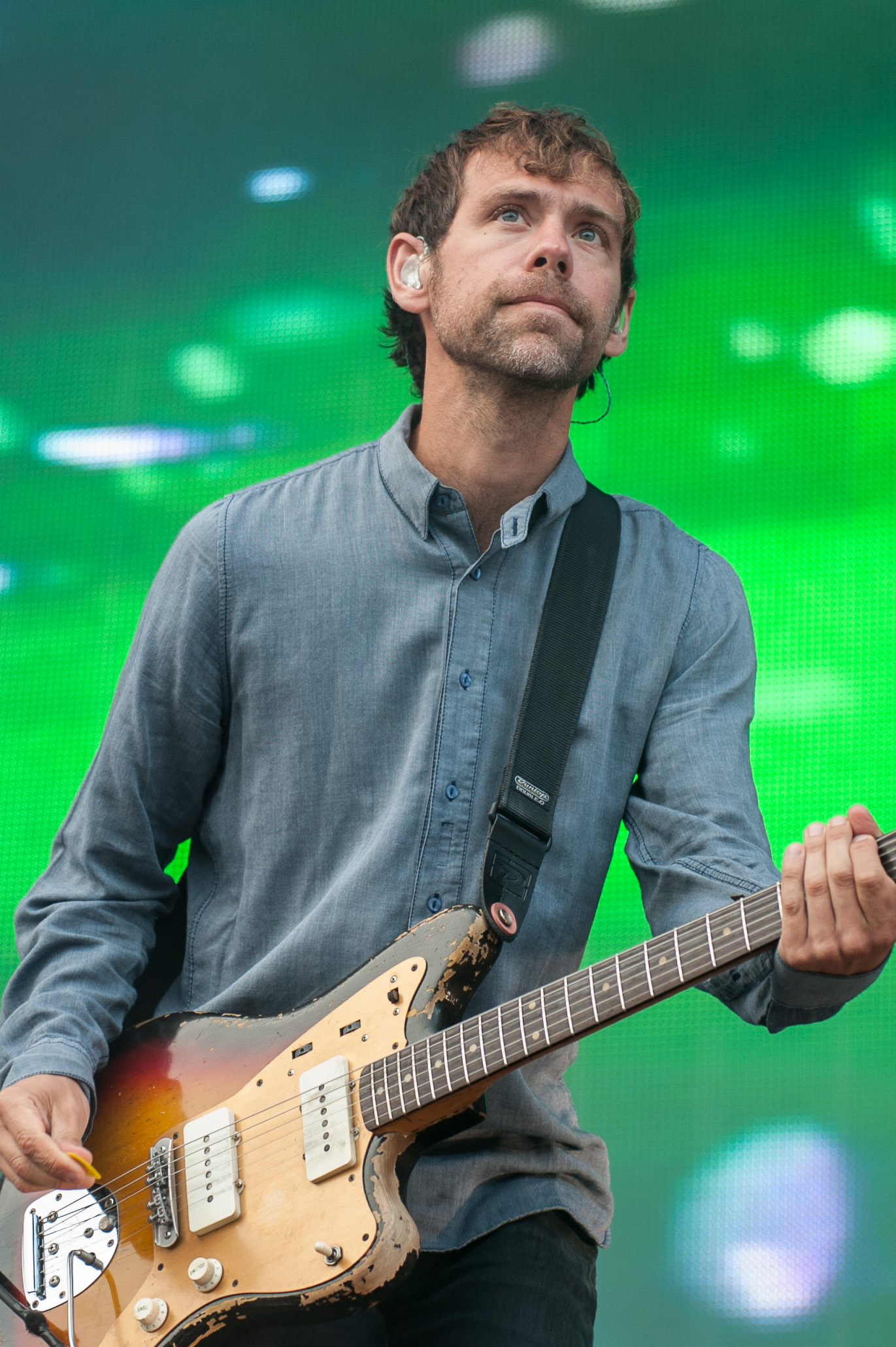
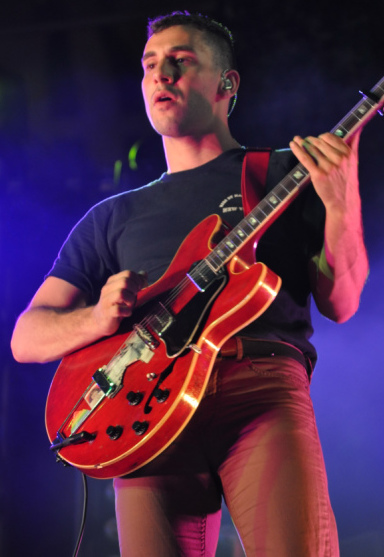
Folklore features production from Aaron Dessner (pictured left) and Jack Antonoff (right); Dessner produced the majority of tracks.

Swift had previously met the National on a Saturday Night Live episode in 2014, and attended one of their concerts in 2019, where she talked to Dessner and his twin brother Bryce. She asked Aaron Dessner about his songwriting technique, because it is her "favorite thing to ask people who I'm a fan of", and he replied his band members live in different parts of the world, and that he would make instrumental tracks and send them to the lead singer, Matt Berninger, who would write the lyrics—this ignited Swift's idea to create music in quarantine.

Due to the pandemic, all recording studios were closed, so Swift built a home studio at her Los Angeles residence, named Kitty Committee, with help from engineer Laura Sisk. Antonoff, with whom Swift worked on five songs from the album, operated from New York City while Sisk recorded Swift's vocals in Los Angeles. "My Tears Ricochet" was the first song written for Folklore. Swift wrote it about her ties with Scott Borchetta, founder of her old record label, coming to an abrupt end. Antonoff compared the writing process of "Mirrorball" and "August" to that of "Out of the Woods" (2014). Swift wrote "Mirrorball" following the cancellation of Lover Fest, as an ode to fans who find solace in her music and concerts. She wrote "August" about a fictitious mistress, and "This Is Me Trying" based on multiple narratives, such as dealing with addiction, and her own mental health in 2016 and 2017 when she felt she was "worth absolutely nothing."

In late April, Swift approached Dessner to co-write some songs remotely. He worked on eleven of the album's 16 tracks over the next few months. Dessner "thought it would take a while for song ideas to come" and "had no expectations as far as what we could accomplish remotely", but was surprised that "a few hours after sharing music, my phone lit up with a voice memo from Taylor of a fully written song—the momentum never really stopped." Swift and Dessner "were pretty much in touch daily for three or four months by text and phone calls." He would mail her folders of instrumentals, and she would write the "entire top line"—melody and lyrics, and "he wouldn't know what the song would be about, what it was going to be called, where [she] was going to put the chorus." The first song the duo wrote was "Cardigan", which is based on one of Dessner's sketches called "Maple". "Cardigan" was followed by "Seven" and "Peace". Upon hearing the composition of "Peace", Swift felt an "immediate sense of serenity" that roused the feeling of being peaceful, but felt it would be "too on-the-nose" to sing about finding peace; she instead wrote about complex "conflicted" feelings contrasting the track's calming sound, and recorded it in one vocal take.

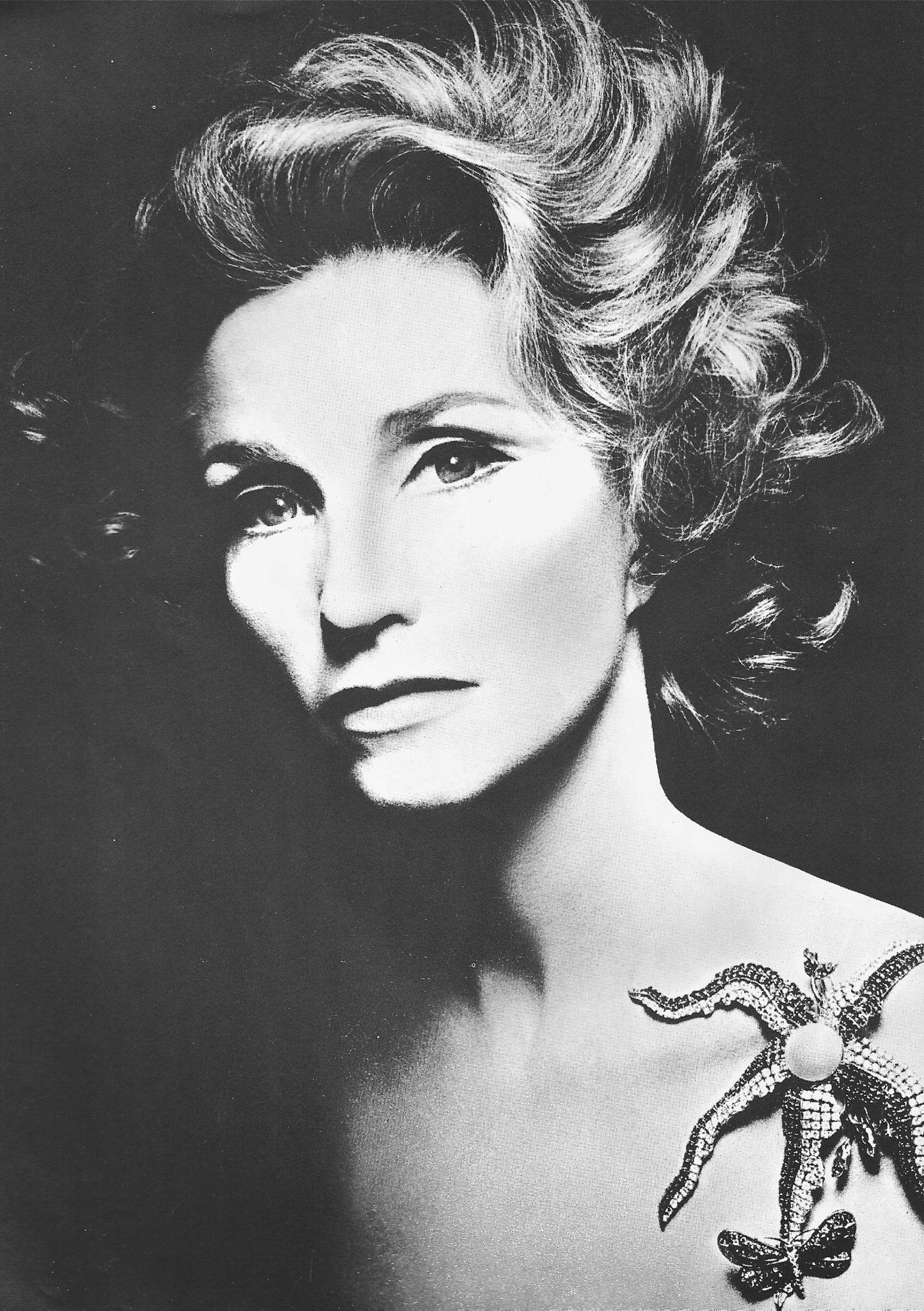
Rebekah Harkness, the former owner of Swift's Rhode Island house, is the muse behind the third track, "The Last Great American Dynasty".

A few weeks later, when Swift and Dessner had written "six or seven" songs, she explained him her concept of Folklore. She told him about the work she had done earlier with Antonoff, concluding that both of her works resonate as an album. Swift and Dessner also wrote "The Last Great American Dynasty", "Mad Woman", and "Epiphany", the first of which has an array of electric guitars inspired by Radiohead's 2007 surprise album In Rainbows. The lyrics document the American socialite Rebekah Harkness, whom Swift had been wanting to write about ever since she bought the Holiday House in 2013. Dessner composed the piano melody for "Mad Woman" with his earlier work on "Cardigan" and "Seven" in mind. On "Epiphany", he slowed down and reversed the sounds of different instruments to create a "giant stack of harmony", and added piano for a cinematic trope. Swift wrote the song based on the experiences of her veteran grandfather, and healthcare workers in the pandemic.

Swift wrote two songs, "Exile" and "Betty", with her then-boyfriend, the English actor Joe Alwyn. She developed "Exile" as a duet, and Dessner recorded a draft of her singing both the male and female parts. Swift and Dessner ran through candidates for the male partner, and Swift liked the voice of Bon Iver's Justin Vernon, who is one half of the American indie rock band Big Red Machine, along with Dessner. Dessner sent the song to Vernon, who liked the song, added his own lyrics, and sang his part. "Betty" is the only song on the album produced by both Dessner and Antonoff; Swift was influenced by Bob Dylan's The Freewheelin' Bob Dylan (1963) and John Wesley Harding (1967) for its composition. Alwyn used the pseudonym William Bowery for his credits. Upon the album's release, mainstream media and fans pointed out Bowery's lack of online presence, and presumed that it was actually a pseudonym for Alwyn, which was later ultimately confirmed by Swift. Swift added that he also penned the chorus of "Betty", and the piano line and first verse in "Exile". The last two songs written were "The 1" and "Hoax", the first and last songs on the album respectively; Swift wrote both in a span of a few hours. Speaking about his collaboration with her, Dessner commented, "there's a palpable humanity and warmth and raw emotion in these songs that I hope you'll love and take comfort in as much as I do."

In a November 2020 Rolling Stone interview with Paul McCartney, Swift stated she began using words in the album's lyrics that she always wanted to use, not worrying about whether it would suit radio. She used "bigger, flowerier, prettier" words such as "epiphany", "elegies", and "divorcée", just because they "sound beautiful". Swift disclosed that she maintains lists of such words, and recalled using one such, "kaleidoscope", in "Welcome to New York" (2014). In a December 2020 Entertainment Weekly interview, Swift said the lyrics, melodies, and production of Folklore are the way she wanted them, without subjecting to others' expectations.

Taylor has opened the door for artists to not feel pressure to have "the bop". To make the record that she made, while running against what is programmed in radio at the highest levels of pop music—she has kind of made an anti-pop record.

— Dessner on Swift's new sonic direction in Folklore, Billboard

Folklore was written and recorded in secrecy. Swift, her boyfriend, family, management team, Antonoff, and Dessner were aware of the album's creation; she did not disclose the news or play the album to her friends as she did with her previous works. Near the end of Folklore's recording process, Dessner reached out to his regular collaborators, including the National bandmates, to provide instrumentation remotely. Bryce orchestrated several songs, while Bryan Devendorf performed the drums in "Seven". Dessner kept Swift's involvement confidential from his family and colleagues until the announcement. While filming the "Cardigan" music video, Swift wore an earpiece and lip-synced to the song to prevent it from leaking. Dessner stated that Swift's label, Republic Records, was unaware of the album until hours before its launch.

== Composition ==
=== Music and production ===
Folklore is sonically mellow and slow-paced, different from the radio- and arena-friendly pop sound of Swift's previous albums. Its minimal, balladic production is built on instruments typically associated with folk and classical music: sonorous pianos, picked guitars, subdued percussions and programmed drums, and orchestrations of strings and horns. The album additionally incorporates electronic elements that result in an electroacoustic soundscape; the synths and programmed beats that had characterized Swift's pop albums are dialed down to a subliminal texture in Folklore. Swift's vocals are highlighted by the spare arrangements. Folklore marked a departure from the more prominently defined choruses of Swift's earlier albums, by reduced dynamic contrasts and emphasis on chorus preparation, and more ambiguous structures. Although critics generally viewed Folklore as a new sonic direction in Swift's discography, Rolling Stone's Rob Sheffield opined that the album's sound resembled that of her 2012 song "Safe & Sound", and The Ringer's Nora Princiotti contended that it was connected with two songs on Lover—"The Archer" and "It's Nice to Have a Friend".

Folklore has been likened to a variety of styles associated with various genres of music including folk, pop, indie, alternative, electronic, and rock, largely chamber pop, indie folk, electro-folk, folk rock, and indie rock. Other reviewers, to a lesser extent, associated the album's sound with alternative pop, chamber folk, chamber rock, folk-pop, indietronica, and soft rock. Meanwhile, some critics, such as Exclaim!'s Kaelen Bell and The New Yorker's Amanda Petrusich, disagreed, arguing that Folklore was fundamentally pop music. The album also incorporates elements of country, dream pop, and electronica.

=== Themes and lyrics ===
A tale that becomes folklore is one that is passed down and whispered around. Sometimes even sung about. The lines between fantasy and reality blur and the boundaries between truth and fiction become almost indiscernible. Speculation, over time, becomes fact. Myths, ghost stories, and fables. Fairytales and parables. Gossip and legend. Someone's secrets written in the sky for all to behold. In isolation, my imagination has run wild and this album is the result, a collection of songs and stories that flowed like a stream of consciousness. Picking up a pen was my way of escaping into fantasy, history, and memory. I've told these stories to the best of my ability with all the love, wonder, and whimsy they deserve. Now it's up to you to pass them down.

— Swift on the concept of Folklore, Instagram

Folklore consists of songs exploring points of view that diverge from Swift's life, including third-person narratives written from perspectives of characters that interweave across the tracks. Its songwriting style combines balladeering with autobiographical experiences and character-driven storytelling, and is primarily distinguished by themes of wistfulness, escapism, nostalgia, contemplation, and empathy. Although Swift opted for a new sound, the album retains stylistic aspects of her trademark songwriting, such as mournful delivery and bildungsroman passion.

Compared to much of her older discography, Folklore reflected Swift's deepening self-awareness, introspection, and vivid storytelling that showed a higher degree of fictionalization and fewer self-references, culminating in an outward-looking approach. The lyricism is both personal and fictional, and a blend of both at times. The emotional and narrative range of Folklore is widened by expanding the focus from Swift's personal stories to imagined characters and personifications.

The narratives described in Folklore include a ghost finding its murderer at its funeral, a seven-year-old girl with a traumatized friend, an old widow spurned by her town, recovering alcoholics, and a love triangle between the fictional characters Betty, James, and an unnamed woman, (Note: Though not mentioned in the album, Swift refers to the unnamed narrator of "August" as Augustine or Augusta.) as depicted in the tracks "Cardigan", "Betty" and "August", with each of the three songs written from each of the character's perspective in different times in their lives. NPR's Ann Powers defined Folklore as a "body constructed of memory, a shared sense of the world, built of myths, heard stories", based on the idea that "we each have our own folklore", with the album being Swift's folklore. Many songs on the album exude a cinematic quality in their lyrics, and reference objects and phenomena in nature, such as a solar eclipse, Saturn, auroras, purple-pink skies, cliff-side pools, salt air, weeds, and Wisteria.

=== Songs ===
"The 1", the opening track, is a soft rock tune driven by a bouncy arrangement of piano, minimal percussion, and electronic accents. From the perspective of Swift's friend, "The 1" describes a newfound positive approach to life and past love, wishing they could have been soulmates. The slow-burning "Cardigan" is a folk ballad driven by moody, stripped-down instrumentals consisting of drums and tender piano; Swift sings from the perspective of a fictional character named Betty, who recalls the separation and enduring optimism of a relationship with a boy named James.

"The Last Great American Dynasty" is an alternative indie pop tune with classical instruments like slide guitar, viola, violins, drums and glitchy production elements. The satirical song tells the story of Rebekah Harkness, the founder of Harkness Ballet, when she resided in Swift's Rhode Island mansion. It details how Harkness married into an upper-class family, was hated by the town, and blamed for the death of her then-husband and heir to Standard Oil, William Harkness (referred to in the song as Bill), and the fall of his family's name, and draws parallels with Swift's life. "Exile" is a gospel-influenced, indie folk duet with Bon Iver, fusing Swift's soft vocals with Vernon's growling baritone, serving as an unspoken, argumentative conversation between two former lovers. It begins with a plodding piano and reaches a dramatic climax accompanied by strings, synths, and harmonies.

"Mirrorball"
The instrumentation of "Mirrorball", the sixth track, is characterized by its jangle, tambourine, and "nervous dance-floor" sensibility.

"Seven"
The seventh track, "Seven", opens with Swift's "lustrous" upper register.

Sung from the perspective of a deceased lover's ghost, "My Tears Ricochet" is an icy arena-goth song that reflects on the tensions following the end of a marital relationship, using funereal imagery—a metaphor for Scott Borchetta and his sale of the masters of Swift's older catalogue. It encompasses a music box, backing choir, reverbed ad-libs in the bridge, and reaches a tumultuous climax over shuddering drums. "Mirrorball" is a folk-tinged dream pop song, driven by pedal steel and twanging guitars. Its lyrics portray Swift as a disco ball, pertaining to the reflective quality, describing her ability to entertain people with her music by making herself vulnerable and sensitive.

In "Seven", Swift sings in an innocent tone, reminiscing about an abused friend from her childhood in Pennsylvania, whom she cannot fully remember but still has fond memories of, over a resonant arrangement consisting of flurrying strings and piano. "August" is a gloomy dream-pop song that captures the summer affair between two young lovers—a naive girl who is seen holding on to a boy that "wasn't hers to lose"; the boy is revealed to be James, later in the album. The song depicts the girl grieve and yearn over her love, using Swift's light and breezy delivery, "yo-yoing" vocal yelps, and a grandiose production driven by acoustic guitar, glistening vocal reverb, and key changes.

The ninth track, "This Is Me Trying", is an orchestral pop song detailing the accountability and regret of an alcoholic who admits feeling inadequate. It contains Swift's "ghostly", reverberated vocals and a gradually growing, dense production. Over an acoustic arrangement of finger-plucked strings and soft horns, "Illicit Affairs" unfolds the infidelity of a disloyal narrator and highlights the measures they carry out to keep the affair a secret. "Invisible String" is a folk song that provides a glimpse into Swift's love life with Alwyn, recounting the "invisible" connection between them that they were not aware of until they met, alluding to an East Asian folk myth called the Red Thread of Fate. It comprises an acoustic riff, thumping vocal backbeats, a distinct passive writing style, and references her older songs.

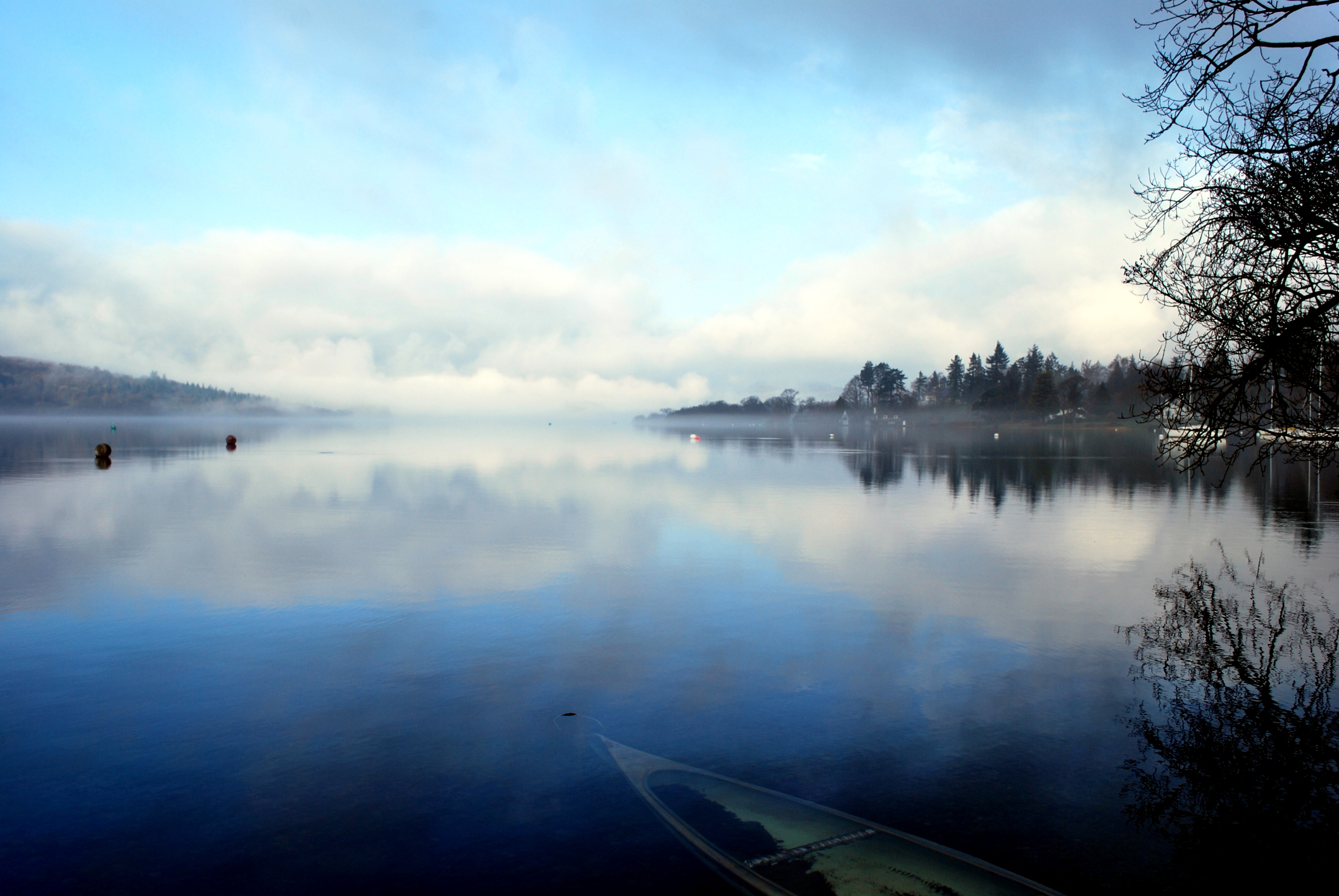
In the seventeenth track, "The Lakes", Swift introspects on semi-retirement near Windermere, located in England's Lake District.

"Mad Woman" tackles the taboo linked with female anger, using sarcastic remarks at sexism, as Folklore's moment of vituperation. It metaphorically describes Swift's dispute with Borchetta and Scooter Braun, painting the story of a deviant widow getting revenge, with references to witch hunts. "Epiphany" is an ambient hymn. It depicts the devastation of the pandemic, paying homage to healthcare workers, with whom she empathizes, comparing them to traumatized military soldiers, such as her veteran grandfather, Dean, who fought at the Battle of Guadalcanal (1942). The song is carried by a glacial piano and a howling brass.

The fourteenth track, "Betty", is a country and folk rock song with prominent harmonica. It describes the relationship narrated in "Cardigan", but from the perspective of the cheating boyfriend James, who had a summer fling with the female narrator of "August". James apologizes for his past actions but does not fully own up to them, citing excuses. Its characters (Betty, James, and Inez) are named after the daughters of Blake Lively and Ryan Reynolds. The R&B-inclining "Peace" features jazzy vocals with a complex vocal melody over a pulse juxtaposed with three lushly harmonized basslines, complemented by minimal synths and a drizzling piano. Lyrically, "Peace" is an ode to Swift's lover, dissects the effects of hectic stardom on her relationship, and warns the subject of future challenges.

The standard edition of the album closes with "Hoax", a slow piano ballad with emotionally raw lyrics that detail a flawed but everlasting relationship, ending the album on a despondent note of sadness. The deluxe bonus track, "The Lakes", is a string-laden midtempo song that introspects on Swift's semi-retirement in England's Lake District; the location is also mentioned in "Invisible String". Imagining a red rose growing out of tundra "with no one around to tweet it", Swift fantasizes about a social-media-free utopia, referencing William Wordsworth, an English poet known for his Romantic writings.

== Art direction ==
From the very beginning, Taylor had a clear idea of what she wanted for the album's visuals. We looked at Surrealist work, imagery that toyed with human scale in nature. We also looked at early autochromes, ambrotypes, and photo storybooks from the 1940s.

— Beth Garrabrant, Meet the photographer behind Taylor Swift's Folklore artwork, i-D

Folklore's album art, packaging, and lyric videos were created through a DIY approach. Swift collaborated with photographer Beth Garrabrant for the artworks, without a technical team due to COVID-19 concerns. The photoshoot marked a change from Swift's older shoots, where she would have "100 people on set, commanding alongside other people in a very committee fashion." She styled herself, including hair, makeup, and wardrobe, and prescribed Garrabrant a specific moodboard. The photographs are characterized by a grayscale, black and white filter.

=== Cover artwork ===
The standard cover art depicts Swift as a 19th-century pioneer sleepwalking in a nightgown. She is seen standing alone in a misty forest covered by morning fog, wearing a long, double-breasted plaid coat over a white prairie dress, gazing at the height of the trees. On the backside cover, she stands turned away from the camera, wearing a slouchy flannel-lined denim jacket slumped around her arms, and a white lace frock, with two loose braided buns low over her nape, similar to the American Girl doll Kirsten Larson. The album title is written in an italicized roman font reminiscent of "a Chronicles of Narnia scrawl". The photos were shot at Swift's friend's house in Lewisboro, New York. "So, I called my friend who has some woods behind her house and was like, 'Can I take some pictures in your forest?' She said yes," Swift said. "I ordered all these night gowns online and brought them and did my own hair and makeup and just was like, 'I guess I'll braid it, I don't know.'"

Folklore logo

In December 2020, Jimmy Kimmel interviewed Swift about the presence of the word "Woodvale" on the cover of "Hide and Seek" edition of Folklore, which some suspected to be the title of a new album after Evermore; Swift denied it and said she did not reveal Folklore's title to anyone until just before its release and used "Woodvale" as a code name, which was included in an artwork for reference, but was accidentally printed in the final products.

=== Aesthetic and fashion ===
Reflecting its lyrical motifs of escapism, Folklore sees Swift embracing a rustic, nature-focused, cottagecore aesthetic for the project, moving away from the "technicolor carnival" of its predecessor, Lover. The music video for "Cardigan" expands on the cottagecore motif, and starts with her sitting at a vintage piano in a cozy cabin in the woods. The video features a moss-covered forest and a waterfall-producing piano. On her website, Swift sold replicas of the "folklore cardigan" she wore in the video—a cream colored cable knit, with silver embroidered stars on the sleeves' chunky elbows, and navy blue piping and buttons.

W regarded the cardigan as the "pièce de résistance" of the aesthetic, and thought the eight cover artworks of Folklore have Swift "frolicking through the woods like a cottagecore queen". Irish Independent wrote that she became a "rural tunesmith communing with the birds and the trees", dressed up in a bulky "Clancy Brothers-style" Aran sweater. RTÉ thanked Swift for putting cardigans "back on the map once more". Noting that her album eras have been defined by their own color scheme, fashion, and cultural motifs, Teen Vogue described Folklore as simple, neutral-toned wear, with the cardigan helping in understanding the sentimental role clothing plays. Cottagecore faced a resurgence on the internet after Swift used the aesthetic, with a sales surge of hand-knitted Aran sweaters in Ireland and the US.

Comparing it with her past albums, The Guardian characterized 1989 as sleek and suave, Reputation as gothic and dangerous, and Lover as jovial and pastel-hued, whereas Folklore is the monochrome tale of a songwriter returning to folksy roots. Refinery29 dubbed the aesthetic as Swift's return to her "truest self" and compared her new look to that of a "classic English Rose". Vogue found Swift opting for a pastoral palette and drew parallels to the music video of her 2012 single "Safe & Sound". Beats Per Minute deemed the aesthetic reminiscent of works by painters Grant Wood, Andrew Wyeth, and Lionel Walden, especially Wood's American Gothic. Vulture defined Folklore as "an eerie black-and-white indie period horror film" that pays homage to various cult classic films, especially A24 horror films, with its songs evoking cinematic visuals. The album's aesthetic has been compared to the visuals in multiple films, including Ivan's Childhood (1962), Picnic at Hanging Rock (1975), The Blair Witch Project (1999), Pan's Labyrinth (2006), The Babadook (2014), The Witch (2015), The Beguiled (2017), Woodshock (2017), The Lighthouse (2019), Midsommar (2019) and Little Women (2019).

== Release and promotion ==
Folklore was a surprise album. It marked the first time Swift abandoned her traditional album rollout, opting to release suddenly due to intuition; she stated, "If you make something you love, you should just put it out into the world." She unveiled the album via her social media on July 23, 2020, 16 hours prior to its release to digital music platforms at midnight. Swift informed Republic Records about the new album only a few hours before its release, thus it was not widely and immediately available at retail. Deluxe CDs and vinyl LPs with seven other alternate covers were sold exclusively on Swift's website. The standard edition "In the Trees" CDs of Folklore were released to retail on August 7, 2020, while "Meet Me Behind the Mall" CDs were made exclusive to Target. In the United Kingdom, CDs were made available on August 4, 2020, by EMI Records. The formerly physically exclusive Folklore deluxe, featuring the bonus track "The Lakes", was released to digital platforms on August 18, 2020.

Starting on August 20, 2020, a limited number of autographed Folklore CDs were delivered to various indie record shops in the US and Scotland to support small businesses in the pandemic. Swift mailed her Folklore cardigans to celebrity friends and well-wishers. Four six-song compilations of Folklore tracks were released to streaming, based on the thematic cohesion between them; The Escapism Chapter, The Sleepless Nights Chapter, The Saltbox House Chapter, and The Yeah I Showed Up at Your Party Chapter were released in August–September 2020. Swift's ninth studio album, Evermore, is a sequel to Folklore. She dubbed them "sister albums".

=== Singles ===
"Cardigan"
"Cardigan" is a folk ballad with Swift's vocals over stripped down piano, drums, a buoyant riff, and escalating strings.

"Cardigan" serves as the lead single of Folklore. It was accompanied by a music video posted to YouTube, directed by Swift and produced by Jil Hardin. Both were released on July 24, 2020, alongside the album. It was serviced to US pop and adult contemporary music radio formats on July 27. The song debuted at number one on the Billboard Hot 100 chart, becoming Swift's sixth chart-topper and second number-one debut. Billboard noted a unique radio rollout for Folklore, where a few of its tracks were simultaneously promoted to multiple radio formats. While "Cardigan" impacted pop and adult contemporary, "Exile" was sent to adult alternative radio on August 3, 2020, which had initially peaked at number six on the Hot 100, whereas "Betty" was sent to country radio on August 17, after arriving at number six on the Hot Country Songs chart. "The 1" was released as a promotional single in Germany on October 9, 2020; "The 1" had previously reached number four on the Hot 100. On July 24, 2021, the first anniversary of Folklore, the original orchestral version of "The Lakes" was also released as a promotional single.

=== Film and live album ===
A concert documentary, titled Folklore: The Long Pond Studio Sessions, was released on November 25, 2020, to Disney+. It was directed and produced by Swift, seeing her perform all the tracks of Folklore in an intimate setting at Long Pond Studio, and sharing the stories behind the songs, with Antonoff and Dessner. Alongside the film's premiere, Swift's third live album, Folklore: The Long Pond Studio Sessions (From the Disney+ Special), containing the acoustic versions from the film, was released to streaming platforms.

== Critical reception ==
Professional ratings
Aggregate scores
Source	Rating
AnyDecentMusic?	8.5/10
Metacritic	88/100
Review scores
Source	Rating
AllMusic	4/5 stars
The Daily Telegraph	5/5 stars
Entertainment Weekly	A
The Guardian	5/5 stars
The Independent	4/5 stars
The Irish Times	5/5 stars
NME	4/5 stars
Pitchfork	8.0/10
Rolling Stone	4.5/5 stars
The Sydney Morning Herald	5/5 stars

Folklore was met with widespread acclaim from music critics, who praised its emotional weight and introspective songwriting, calling it Swift's most subdued and sophisticated body of work yet. At Metacritic, which assigns a normalized rating out of 100 to reviews from professional publications, the album received an average score of 88, based on 27 reviews, indicating "universal acclaim".

Sheffield lauded Swift's songwriting abilities that brought out her "deepest wit, compassion, and empathy", making Folklore her most intimate album so far. Also noting the album's vivid storytelling filled with imagination and imagery, Pitchfork's Jillian Mapes considered Folklore a mature step in Swift's artistry while retaining her core as a celebrated songwriter. Mark Savage of BBC News classified Folklore as an indie record dealing with nostalgia and mistakes that resonate with the times. Katie Moulton from Consequence appreciated Swift's maturity, particularly the employment of third-person perspectives that had been uncommon in her previous works. Complimenting the album's writing, The Daily Telegraph's Neil McCormick, i's Sarah Carson, and The Sydney Morning Herald's Giselle Au-Nhien Nguyen, gave the album full-score ratings. Describing Folklore as a bold attempt, Hannah Mylrea of NME praised Swift's ability to evoke vivid imagery, but said that the 16-song run can "sometimes drag slightly".

Several critics welcomed Swift's new musical direction. Chris Willman of Variety considered Folklore to be a "first-rank album" and its change of musical style a "serious act of sonic palette cleansing" for Swift. Laura Snapes of The Guardian considered it to be the most cohesive and the most experimental among Swift's releases. Entertainment Weekly's Maura Johnston deemed the album a bold move for a pop star like Swift to challenge its audience. Roisin O'Connor of The Independent praised the album's "exquisite, piano-based poetry", which she found unconventional for Swift's catalog. AllMusic's Stephen Thomas Erlewine was positive towards the album but felt its musical styles are not "precisely new tricks" for Swift. In agreement, Annie Zaleski of The A.V. Club deemed the album not completely experimental, but still a new aspect of Swift's artistry. In his "Consumer Guide" column, Robert Christgau was most moved by the youth-themed "Seven" and "Betty" than the more adult songs, which he summarized as "melodically fetching, lyrically deft pop songs that are fine as far as they go". He singled out "The Last Great American Dynasty" as the only intolerable song for how it reminds him of "Taylor Swift the showbiz plutocrat". In a mixed review, The New York Times critic Jon Caramanica praised Swift's songwriting but felt the album is burdened by "desolate" and "overcomposed" indie rock.

=== Year-end lists ===
A multitude of publications listed Folklore in their lists of best albums of 2020, including number-one placements from Billboard, Los Angeles Times, Rolling Stone, Business Insider, NJ.com, South China Morning Post, Uproxx, USA Today, Us Weekly, Variety, and Walla Walla Union-Bulletin. Folklore placed third on Metacritic's ranking of the most mentioned albums in 2020 year-end lists.

Select year-end rankings
Critic/Publication	List	Rank	Ref.
BBC	The Best Albums of 2020	3	
Billboard	Top 50 Best Albums of 2020	1	
Entertainment Weekly	The 15 Best Albums of 2020	5	
The Guardian	The 50 Best Albums of 2020	9	
The Independent	The 40 Best Albums of 2020	10	
Los Angeles Times	The 10 Best Albums of 2020	1	
NME	The 50 Best Albums of 2020	2	
Pitchfork	The 50 Best Albums of 2020	29	
Rolling Stone	The 50 Best Albums of 2020	1	
Time	The 10 Best Albums of 2020	1	

== Commercial performance ==
=== United States ===
In the US, Folklore topped the Billboard 200 chart for eight weeks, becoming the longest-charting album at number one of 2020. With Folklore, Swift became the first woman with seven number-one debuts, the first act in Nielsen SoundScan history since 1991 to have seven albums each sell 500,000 or more copies in a week, the first woman since Barbra Streisand to have 6 albums each spend multiple weeks at number one, the first solo or female artist (and second after the Beatles) to have 5 albums each top the chart for at least six weeks, and the first musician in the 21st century to have six albums each spend at least four weeks at number one. In December 2020, Evermore charted at number one and Folklore at number three on the Billboard 200, making Swift the first woman to chart two albums in the top three the same week. Folklore was the US best-selling album of 2020 and eighth-best-selling of 2021; Swift became the first act to have a best-selling album of a calendar year five times, following Fearless (2009), 1989 (2014), Reputation (2017), and Lover (2019). By January 2024, it had sold 2.289 million copies in the US. Billboard attributed the album's success to its timing, pandemic-suited songs, and Swift's ability to connect with listeners.

Folklore also debuted at number one on the Alternative Albums chart, becoming Swift's first entry and the chart's biggest debut in history. All of its 16 tracks debuted simultaneously on the Billboard Hot 100, registering the record for the most simultaneous Hot 100 debuts for a female musician; three songs charted in the top 10 and five in the top 20. Swift became the first act to debut atop both the Billboard 200 and Hot 100 the same week, with the number-one debut of "Cardigan". She also became the first act to debut two songs in the top four and three songs in the top six, with "The 1" at number four and "Exile" at number six. On the Hot Rock & Alternative Songs chart, Folklore debuted 11 tracks, of which eight were in the top 10, setting the record for the most top-10 entries.

=== Other markets ===
In its first day of release, Folklore broke global streaming records on Spotify, Apple Music, and Amazon Music. Republic Records reported that the album sold over 1.3 million units worldwide on its first day and 2 million units in its first week. The International Federation of the Phonographic Industry recognized Folklore as the best-selling female album of 2020, with 2 million pure copies sold.

In the English-speaking world, Folklore established several chart records. In the UK, it made Swift the first woman to have five number-one albums on the UK Albums Chart in the 21st century, and was her first album to spend multiple weeks at number one (three weeks). On the UK Singles Chart, "Cardigan", "Exile", and "The 1" opened at numbers six, eight, and 10, making Swift the first woman in UK history to concurrently debut three songs in the top 10. In Ireland, Folklore helped Swift become the first solo female act with five number ones on the Irish Albums Chart of the 21st century, and it spent four weeks at number one. In Australia, it was Swift's sixth number one on the ARIA Albums Chart, giving her more chart toppers during 2010–2020 than any other artist. All of its 16 tracks entered the top 50 of the ARIA Singles Chart, setting the all-time record for the most debuts. With "Cardigan" at number one and "Exile", "The 1", "The Last Great American Dynasty", and "My Tears Ricochet" in the top 10, Swift became the act with the most Australian top-ten hits of 2020. Folklore topped the chart for four consecutive weeks, becoming the only 2020 album to top the chart for more than two weeks, and the country's best-selling album by a woman in 2020.

Elsewhere, Folklore reached number one in Belgian Flanders, Canada, Czech Republic, Denmark, Estonia, Finland, Greece, Norway, and Switzerland. In China, the album sold more than 200,000 copies in its first six hours and around 740,000 copies in its first week, instantly becoming the best-selling and fastest-selling album of 2020 by a Western act. Folklore was the best-selling foreign album of 2020 in Japan.

== Awards ==
Folklore and its songs received five Grammy Award nominations at the 63rd ceremony, winning the Album of the Year. Swift became the first woman in history to win Album of the Year three times, (Note: Her second studio album, Fearless (2008), won the Album of the Year in 2010, followed by her fifth studio album, 1989 (2014), winning the award in 2016.) and the fourth artist overall, tied with Frank Sinatra, Stevie Wonder, and Paul Simon. The album was also nominated for Best Pop Vocal Album, while "Cardigan" was nominated for Best Pop Solo Performance and Song of the Year, making Swift the most nominated female artist in the latter category with five nods. "Exile" contended for Best Pop Duo/Group Performance. At the 2020 American Music Awards, Swift received four nominations: Artist of the Year, Favorite Pop/Rock Female Artist, Favorite Music Video for "Cardigan" and Favorite Pop/Rock Album for Folklore, and won the first three, extending her record as the most awarded artist in the show's history with 32 American Music Awards. It also marked the third consecutive year Swift was crowned the Artist of the Year, and sixth overall—the first and only artist to achieve it.

Awards and nominations
Year	Organization	Award	Result	Ref.
2020	American Music Awards	Favorite Pop/Rock Album	Nominated	
2020	Apple Music Awards	Songwriter of the Year (Folklore)	Won	
2020	ARIA Music Awards	Best International Artist (Folklore)	Nominated	
2020	Danish Music Awards	International Album of the Year	Won	
2020	E! People's Choice Awards	The Album of 2020	Nominated	
2020	Guinness World Records	Most day-one streams of an album on Spotify (female)	Won	
2020	NetEase Annual Music Awards	Top Western Album	Won	
2020	NetEase Annual Music Awards	Top Folk Music Album	Won	
2021	Billboard Music Awards	Top Billboard 200 Album	Nominated	
2021	Gaffa Awards	International Album of the Year	Nominated	
2021	Grammy Awards	Album of the Year	Won	
2021	Grammy Awards	Best Pop Vocal Album	Nominated	
2021	Japan Gold Disc Awards	Best 3 Western Albums	Won	
2021	Juno Awards	International Album of the Year	Nominated	
2021	iHeartRadio Music Awards	Best Pop Album	Won	
2022	TEC Awards	Outstanding Creative Achievement – Record Production/Album	Nominated	

== Legacy ==
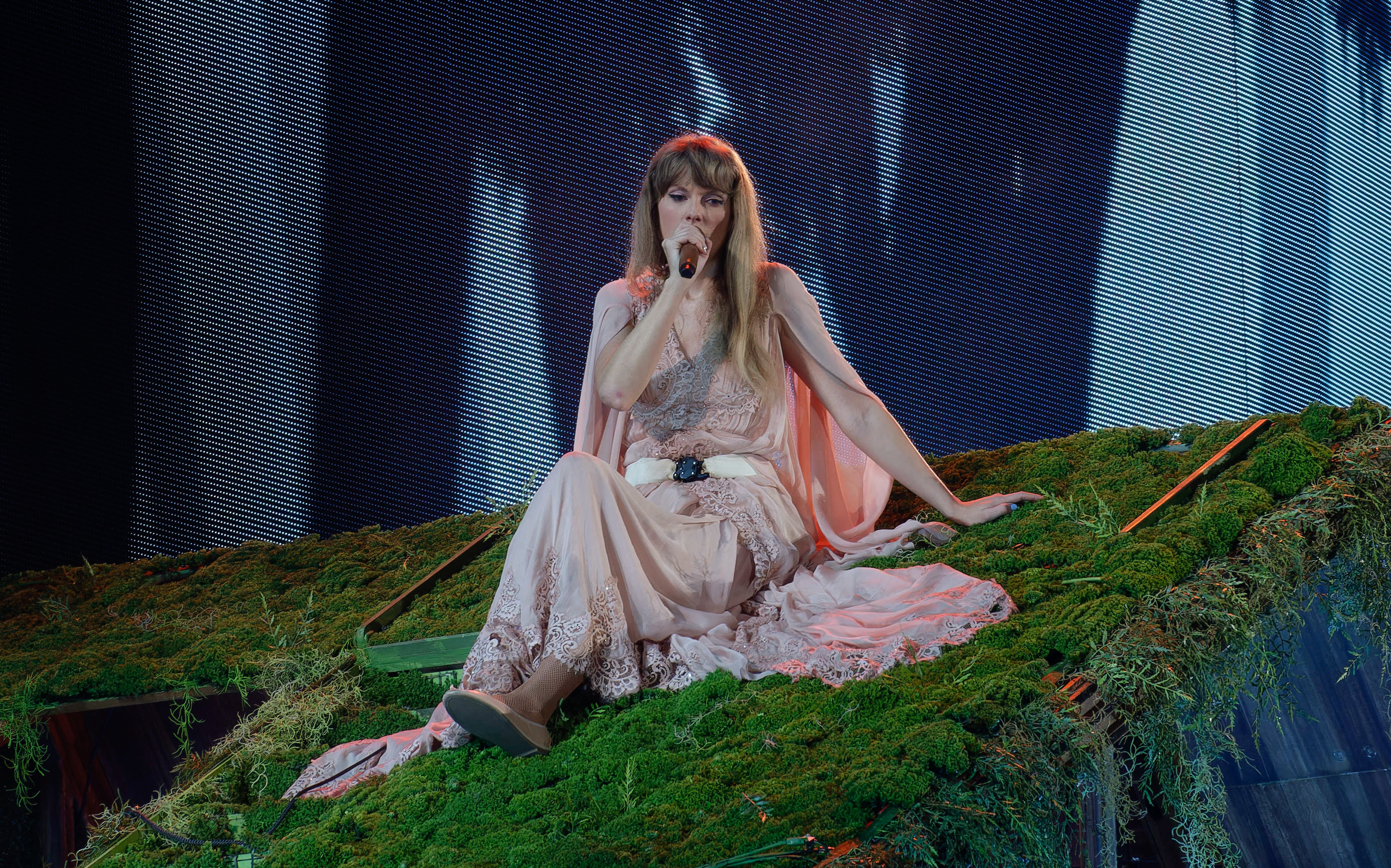
Swift performing the Folklore act of The Eras Tour (2023)

Folklore's release ignited widespread interest in the term "folklore" on the internet. In response to this mainstream attention, the American Folklore Society launched a website titled "What is Folklore?" and engaged in an online campaign to educate the public about folklore studies. Folklorists were recruited to promote the academic field to the general public via social media. Metacritic's traffic skyrocketed by roughly half a million views upon Folklore's release. The site's founder, Marc Doyle, stated, "There's nothing quite like Taylor Swift", whose albums supply "a great deal of traffic and user participation" to the site whenever they are released.

The album has been contextualized as a lockdown project by commentators and earned a reputation as the archetypal quarantine album. The Guardian opined that Folklore was a respite from chaotic events. The Daily Telegraph called it "an exquisite, empathetic lockdown triumph". NME wrote the album will be remembered as "the quintessential lockdown album" that "felt like the perfect accompaniment for the weird loneliness" of 2020. Insider stated that Folklore would be known as "lockdown's one true masterpiece". Rolling Stone said the album may go down in history as "the definitive quarantine album" for providing comfort and catharsis, "just when we needed it most". Billboard proclaimed that Folklore would be cherished as one of Swift's most influential albums. Uproxx noted how Folklore changed the tone of music in 2020, and its impact on the year's cultural landscape "can't be measured".

In a list awarding the most creative works that shaped quarantine, Vulture labeled Folklore as 2020's "Best Breakdown in Musical Form" for addressing topics of loneliness. Vogue listed the album amongst the best moments of lockdown culture. The Week called it "the first great pandemic art" for setting "a high bar" for future pandemic-inspired projects. Financial Times called it "the first great lockdown album", while Hot Press termed it "the first great album of the lockdown era". Judging from its acclaim and commercial success, critic Tom Hull concluded that Swift "caught the spirit of the times" with Folklore. Billboard named Folklore and Evermore as the best examples of innovative albums from artists who amended their creative process during the pandemic, and in a list titled "The 25 Musical Moments That Defined the First Quarter of the 2020s", called the album a "commercial smash" that stands as "one of the quintessential quarantine full-lengths". In 2023, The New York Times named Folklore as one of the "17 pop culture moments that define the COVID era". Rolling Stone ranked the album at number 170 in their 2023 revision of "The 500 Greatest Albums of All Time" and number five in their 2025 list "The 250 Greatest Albums of the 21st Century So Far".

My world felt opened up creatively. There was a point that I got to as a writer who only wrote very diaristic songs that I felt it was unsustainable for my future moving forward. So what I felt after we put out Folklore was like "oh wow, people are into this too, this thing that feels really good for my life and feels really good for my creativity... it feels good for them too?"

— Swift on how Folklore changed her creative process moving forward, Apple Music 1

The making of and rave reception to Folklore encouraged Swift to release Evermore. She has credited Folklore for ushering in a new mindset of songwriting in her repertoire, which in turn influenced her subsequent releases. Swift was the world's highest-paid solo musician of 2020, and the highest paid in the US, solely due to her incomes from the 2020 albums. In 2023, she embarked on the Eras Tour, which included an act dedicated to Folklore.

Folklore influenced other artists' works. Those who cited Folklore as an influence for their music include Hayley Williams for her 2021 album Flowers for Vases / Descansos, Mia Dimšić for her Eurovision 2022 song "Guilty Pleasure", Rina Sawayama for her 2022 Hold the Girl, and Maya Hawke for her 2022 album Moss. Christina Perri and Sabrina Carpenter credited Folklore with encouraging them to be emotionally honest in their songs without worrying about external expectations, and Zahara credited Folklore for encouraging her to compose music again following months of isolation. The success of Folklore prompted artists such as Hawke, Gracie Abrams, Ed Sheeran, King Princess, and Girl in Red to collaborate with Dessner and record songs at his Long Pond Studio. Noah Kahan acknowledged Folklore for bringing a "new generation to folk and folk-pop" and helping his music become more mainstream. American comics writer Sina Grace was inspired by the aesthetic and themes of Folklore to create the story, characters, and art style of the upcoming DC Comics graphic novel Superman: The Harvests of Youth. Folklore is also the subject of multiple academic papers, mostly literary.

== Track listing ==
Standard edition
No.	Title	Writer(s)	Producer(s)	Length
1.	"The 1"	Taylor Swift; Aaron Dessner	Dessner	3:30
2.	"Cardigan"	Swift; Dessner	Dessner	3:59
3.	"The Last Great American Dynasty"	Swift; Dessner	Dessner	3:51
4.	"Exile" (featuring Bon Iver)	Swift; William Bowery; Justin Vernon	Dessner; Joe Alwyn	4:45
5.	"My Tears Ricochet"	Swift	Swift; Jack Antonoff; Alwyn	4:15
6.	"Mirrorball"	Swift; Antonoff	Swift; Antonoff	3:29
7.	"Seven"	Swift; Dessner	Dessner	3:28
8.	"August"	Swift; Antonoff	Swift; Antonoff; Alwyn	4:21
9.	"This Is Me Trying"	Swift; Antonoff	Swift; Antonoff; Alwyn	3:15
10.	"Illicit Affairs"	Swift; Antonoff	Swift; Antonoff; Alwyn	3:10
11.	"Invisible String"	Swift; Dessner	Dessner	4:12
12.	"Mad Woman"	Swift; Dessner	Dessner	3:57
13.	"Epiphany"	Swift; Dessner	Dessner	4:49
14.	"Betty"	Swift; Bowery	Swift; Dessner; Antonoff; Alwyn	4:54
15.	"Peace"	Swift; Dessner	Dessner	3:54
16.	"Hoax"	Swift; Dessner	Dessner	3:40
Total length:				63:29

Deluxe edition
No.	Title	Writer(s)	Producer(s)	Length
17.	"The Lakes"	Swift; Antonoff	Swift; Antonoff	3:31
Total length:				67:00

== Personnel ==
=== Musicians ===
- Taylor Swift – lead vocals, songwriting, production (5, 6, 8–10, 14, 17)
- Aaron Dessner – production (1–4, 7, 11–16), songwriting (1–3, 7, 11–13, 15, 16), piano (1–4, 7, 11–16), acoustic guitar (1, 7, 11, 12, 16), electric guitar (1–4, 11–14, 16), drum programming (1–4, 7, 11, 12), Mellotron (1, 2, 11, 13, 15), OP-1 (1, 4, 16), synth bass (1, 16), percussion (2–4, 7, 11, 12, 14), bass (2, 3, 7, 11, 12, 14, 15), synthesizer (2–4, 7, 11–13, 15), slide guitar (3), keyboards (3), high-string guitar (14), field recording (15), drone (15)
- Bryce Dessner – orchestration (1–4, 7, 11–13)
- Thomas Bartlett – synthesizer (1), OP-1 (1) (Note: This performer is also credited with recording their instrumentation.)
- Jason Treuting – percussion (1)
- Yuki Numata Resnick – viola (1, 2, 7, 11, 12), violin (1, 2, 7, 11, 12)
- Benjamin Lanz – modular synth (2)
- Dave Nelson – trombone (2, 13)
- James McAlister – drum programming (2, 11), beat programming (12), synthesizers (12), hand percussion (12), drums (12)
- Clarice Jensen – cello (2, 7, 11–13)
- Rob Moose – orchestration (3, 16), violin (3, 4, 16), viola (3, 4, 16)
- JT Bates – drums (3, 7, 13)
- Justin Vernon – lead vocals (4), songwriting (4), pulse (15)
- Joe Alwyn – production (4, 5, 8–10, 14), songwriting (4, 14)
- Jack Antonoff – production (5, 6, 8–10, 14, 17), songwriting (6, 8–10, 17), live drums (5, 6, 8–10, 14, 17), percussion (5, 6, 8–10, 14, 17), programming (5, 6, 8–10, 17), electric guitars (5, 6, 8–10, 14, 17), keyboards (5, 6, 8–10, 17), piano (5, 17), bass (5, 8–10, 14), background vocals (5, 6, 9, 10, 17), acoustic guitars (6, 8, 14), B3 (6, 14), organ (9), Mellotron (14)
- Evan Smith – saxophones (5, 8–10, 14, 17), keyboards (5, 8–10, 17), programming (5), flute (8, 17), electric guitar (8, 10), accordion (10), background vocals (10), clarinet (14, 17), bass (17)
- Bobby Hawk – strings (5, 8, 9, 17)
- Bryan Devendorf – drum programming (7)
- Jonathan Low – synth bass (8)
- Mikey Freedom Hart – pedal steel (10, 14), Mellotron (14), Wurlitzer (14), harpsichord (14), vibraphone (14), electric guitar (14)
- Kyle Resnick – trumpet (13)
- Josh Kaufman – harmonica (14), electric guitar (14), lap steel (14)

Additional instrument recording (Note: Several performers are also credited with recording their own instrumentation, as noted in the 'Musicians' section.)

- Kyle Resnick – viola (1, 2, 7, 11–13), violin (1, 2, 7, 11–13)
- Bella Blasko – modular synth (2)
- Lorenzo Wolff – strings (5, 9)
- Mike Williams – strings (8, 17)
- Jon Gautier – strings (8, 17)
- Benjamin Lanz – trombone (13)

=== Technical ===
- Taylor Swift – executive producer
- Jonathan Low – recording (1–4, 7, 11–16), mixing (1–4, 7, 8, 11, 15–17)
- Aaron Dessner – recording (1–4, 7, 11–16), additional recording (2, 11)
- Laura Sisk – recording (5, 6, 8–10, 14, 17), vocal recording (1–3; Swift on 4; 13, 15, 16)
- Jack Antonoff – recording (5, 6, 8–10, 14, 17)
- Bella Blasko – additional recording (2)
- Justin Vernon – vocal recording (Bon Iver on 4)
- John Rooney – assistant engineering (5, 9, 14)
- Jon Sher – assistant engineering (5, 9)
- Şerban Ghenea – mixing (5, 6, 9, 10, 12–14)
- John Hanes – mix engineering (5, 6, 9, 10, 12–14)
- Randy Merrill – mastering

=== Design ===
- Taylor Swift – wardrobe styling, hair and makeup, packaging creative and art direction
- Beth Garrabrant – photography
- 13 Management – packaging design, project support and coordination
- Republic Records – project support and coordination

== Charts ==
=== Weekly charts ===
Weekly chart performanc
Chart (2020–2022)	Peak position
Argentine Albums (CAPIF)	1
Australian Albums (ARIA)	1
Austrian Albums (Ö3 Austria)	2
Belgian Albums (Ultratop Flanders)	1
Belgian Albums (Ultratop Wallonia)	3
Canadian Albums (Billboard)	1
Croatian International Albums (HDU)	2
Czech Albums (ČNS IFPI)	1
Danish Albums (Hitlisten)	1
Dutch Albums (Album Top 100)	2
Estonian Albums (Eesti Ekspress)	1
Finnish Albums (Suomen virallinen lista)	1
French Albums (SNEP)	12
German Albums (Offizielle Top 100)	5
Greek Albums (IFPI)	1
Hungarian Albums (MAHASZ)	7
Icelandic Albums (Tónlistinn)	8
Irish Albums (Official Charts)	1
Italian Albums (FIMI)	8
Japan Hot Albums (Billboard Japan)	8
Japanese Albums (Oricon)	10
Lithuanian Albums (AGATA)	2
New Zealand Albums (RMNZ)	1
Norwegian Albums (VG-lista)	1
Polish Albums (ZPAV)	8
Portuguese Albums (AFP)	2
Scottish Albums (Official Charts)	2
Slovak Albums (ČNS IFPI)	4
South Korean Albums (Gaon)	27
Spanish Albums (Promusicae)	2
Swedish Albums (Sverigetopplistan)	3
Swiss Albums (Schweizer Hitparade)	1
Swiss Albums (Romandie)	1
UK Albums (Official Charts)	1
UK Americana Albums (Official Charts)	1
Uruguayan Albums (CUD)	1
US Billboard 200	1
US Top Rock & Alternative Albums (Billboard)	1

=== Year-end charts ===
2020 year-end chart performance
Chart (2020)	Position
Australian Albums (ARIA)	2
Austrian Albums (Ö3 Austria)	66
Belgian Albums (Ultratop Flanders)	30
Canadian Albums (Billboard)	9
Croatian International Albums (HDU)	34
Danish Albums (Hitlisten)	36
Dutch Albums (Album Top 100)	46
German Albums (Offizielle Top 100)	89
Irish Albums (IRMA)	7
New Zealand Albums (RMNZ)	7
Norwegian Albums (VG-lista)	27
Portuguese Albums (AFP)	53
Spanish Albums (PROMUSICAE)	52
Swiss Albums (Schweizer Hitparade)	70
UK Albums (OCC)	12
US Billboard 200	5
US Top Alternative Albums	1

2021 year-end chart performance
Chart (2021)	Position
Australian Albums (ARIA)	20
Belgian Albums (Ultratop Flanders)	49
Canadian Albums (Billboard)	14
Danish Albums (Hitlisten)	56
Dutch Albums (Album Top 100)	100
Irish Albums (IRMA)	18
New Zealand Albums (RMNZ)	27
Portuguese Albums (AFP)	80
Spanish Albums (PROMUSICAE)	70
UK Albums (OCC)	38
US Billboard 200	12
US Top Alternative Albums (Billboard)	2

2022 year-end chart performance
Chart (2022)	Position
Australian Albums (ARIA)	25
Belgian Albums (Ultratop Flanders)	49
Canadian Albums (Billboard)	30
Croatian International Albums (HDU)	38
Danish Albums (Hitlisten)	93
Dutch Albums (Album Top 100)	100
New Zealand Albums (RMNZ)	30
Portuguese Albums (AFP)	85
Spanish Albums (PROMUSICAE)	69
UK Albums (OCC)	30
US Billboard 200	41
US Top Alternative Albums (Billboard)	2

2023 year-end chart performance
Chart (2023)	Position
Australian Albums (ARIA)	12
Austrian Albums (Ö3 Austria)	35
Belgian Albums (Ultratop Flanders)	18
Belgian Albums (Ultratop Wallonia)	178
Canadian Albums (Billboard)	13
Danish Albums (Hitlisten)	51
Dutch Albums (Album Top 100)	23
German Albums (Offizielle Top 100)	41
Hungarian Albums (MAHASZ)	82
New Zealand Albums (RMNZ)	12
Portuguese Albums (AFP)	21
Spanish Albums (PROMUSICAE)	92
Swedish Albums (Sverigetopplistan)	76
UK Albums (OCC)	13
US Billboard 200	12
US Top Alternative Albums (Billboard)	1

2024 year-end chart performance
Chart (2024)	Position
Australian Albums (ARIA)	11
Belgian Albums (Ultratop Flanders)	8
Belgian Albums (Ultratop Wallonia)	134
Canadian Albums (Billboard)	17
Croatian International Albums (HDU)	13
Danish Albums (Hitlisten)	47
Dutch Albums (Album Top 100)	26
German Albums (Offizielle Top 100)	19
Global Albums (IFPI)	17
Icelandic Albums (Tónlistinn)	99
Portuguese Albums (AFP)	11
Swedish Albums (Sverigetopplistan)	64
Swiss Albums (Schweizer Hitparade)	95
UK Albums (OCC)	19
US Billboard 200	14
US Top Alternative Albums (Billboard)	4

2025 year-end chart performance
Chart (2025)	Position
Australian Albums (ARIA)	37
Austrian Albums (Ö3 Austria)	69
Belgian Albums (Ultratop Flanders)	43
Canadian Albums (Billboard)	31
Dutch Albums (Album Top 100)	78
German Albums (Offizielle Top 100)	56
UK Albums (OCC)	44
US Billboard 200	37
US Top Rock & Alternative Albums (Billboard)	6

== Certifications and sales ==
Certifications, with pure sales where available
Region	Certification	Certified units/sales
Australia (ARIA)	3× Platinum	210,000^{‡}
Austria (IFPI Austria)	Platinum	15,000^{‡}
Belgium (BRMA)	Gold	10,000^{‡}
Canada (Music Canada)	7× Platinum	560,000^{‡}
Denmark (IFPI Danmark)	3× Platinum	60,000^{‡}
France (SNEP)	Platinum	78,000
Germany (BVMI)	Platinum	200,000^{‡}
Italy (FIMI)	Platinum	50,000^{‡}
New Zealand (RMNZ)	5× Platinum	75,000^{‡}
Norway (IFPI Norway)	Platinum	20,000^{‡}
Poland (ZPAV)	2× Platinum	40,000^{‡}
Portugal (AFP)	Platinum	7,000^{‡}
Singapore (RIAS)	Gold	5,000^{*}
Spain (Promusicae)	Gold	20,000^{‡}
Switzerland (IFPI Switzerland)	Gold	10,000^{‡}
United Kingdom (BPI)	3× Platinum	900,000^{‡}
United States (RIAA)	6× Platinum	6,000,000^{‡}
^{*} Sales figures based on certification alone.^{‡} Sales+streaming figures based on certification alone.

== Release history ==
Release dates and formats
Initial release date	Edition(s)	Format(s)	Ref.
July 24, 2020	Standard	Digital download; streaming	
August 4, 2020	Deluxe	CD; digital download; streaming; vinyl LP; cassette	

== See also ==
- List of Billboard 200 number-one albums of 2020
- List of UK Albums Chart number ones of the 2020s
- List of UK Album Downloads Chart number ones of the 2020s
- List of number-one albums of 2020 (Canada)
- List of number-one albums of 2020 (Australia)
- List of number-one albums of 2020 (Ireland)
- List of number-one albums from the 2020s (New Zealand)
- List of number-one albums in Norway
- List of number-one albums of 2020 (Belgium)
- List of best-selling albums in China
