= Mad Woman =

2020 song by Taylor Swift

Song by Taylor Swift

from the album Folklore
- Released: July 24, 2020
- Studio: Long Pond (Hudson Valley)
- Genre: Indie folk
- Length: 3:57
- Label: Republic
- Songwriters: Taylor Swift; Aaron Dessner
- Producer: Aaron Dessner

Lyric video
- "Mad Woman" on YouTube

"Mad Woman" is a song by the American singer-songwriter Taylor Swift from her eighth studio album, Folklore (2020). She wrote the track with its producer, Aaron Dessner. "Mad Woman" is an indie folk ballad that incorporates soft piano, strings, and guitar licks. Inspired by Swift's 2019 masters dispute with the businessman Scooter Braun, the lyrics address gender double standards, gaslighting, sexism, internalized misogyny, and the taboo associated with women's anger.

Music critics generally appreciated "Mad Woman" for its concept and composition. Commercially, it reached the national charts of Australia, Canada, Portugal, Singapore, and the United States, and received a platinum certification in Australia, gold certifications in Brazil and New Zealand, and a silver certification in the United Kingdom. Swift recorded a stripped-down rendition of "Mad Woman" as part of the documentary film Folklore: The Long Pond Studio Sessions and its live album in 2020, and performed it on piano twice at her sixth concert tour, the Eras Tour (2023–2024).

== Background and production ==
Taylor Swift began working on her eighth studio album, Folklore, during the COVID-19 lockdowns in early 2020. She wrote nine songs on the album with their producer, Aaron Dessner, including "Mad Woman". After listening to the song's "melodic and emotional" piano instrumental and its "ominous" string technique, Swift wanted to write and sing about "female rage"—a theme she thought would complement the production. In the primer that preceded Folklore's release, she teased imageries of various tracks, with "Mad Woman" being about "a misfit widow getting gleeful revenge on the town that cast her out." Swift said that the song's theme was gaslighting, which she thought to be the "most rage-provoking element of being a female".

Dessner recorded "Mad Woman" with Jonathan Low at Long Pond Studio in the Hudson Valley. He additionally provided drum programming and played piano, acoustic guitar, electric guitar, bass guitar, synthesizer, and percussion. The track was mixed by Serban Ghenea at MixStar Studios in Virginia Beach, Virginia; mastered by Randy Merrill at Sterling Sound Studios in New York City; and engineered by John Hanes. James McAlister provided beat programming and hand percussion, and played drums and synthesizers. Other musicians who played instruments include Clarice Jensen (cello) and Yuki Numata Resnick (viola, violin). Bryce Dessner worked as the orchestrator, while Kyle Resnick recorded the viola and violin arrangements.

== Composition ==
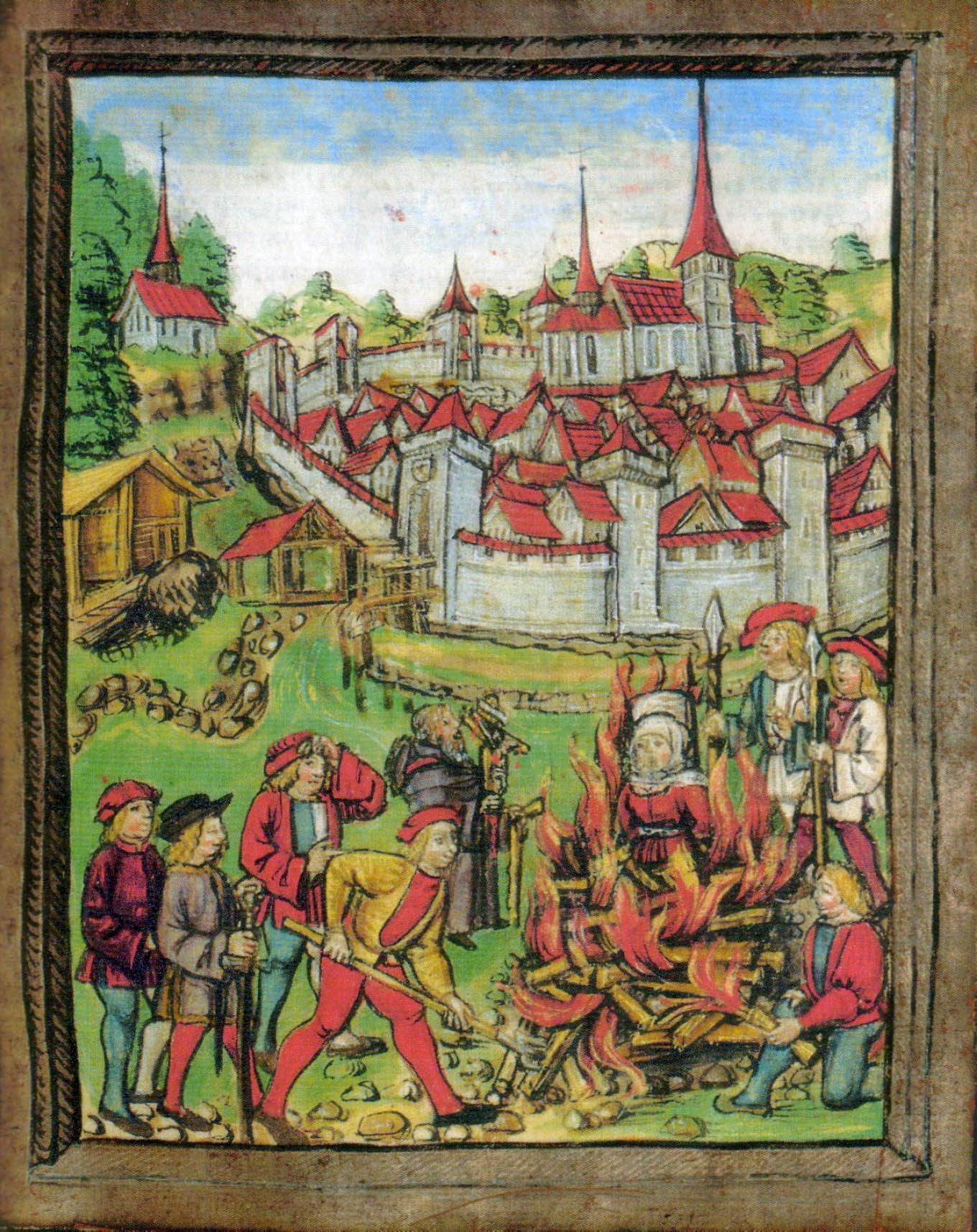
"Mad Woman" addresses sexism and gender issues, referencing witch hunts (pictured).

"Mad Woman" is an indie folk ballad that features soft piano, strings, and guitar licks, and lasts for three minutes and fifty-seven seconds. Lyrically, the track addresses sexism, internalized misogyny, gender double standards, and the taboo linked with female anger, which is exemplified in the refrain: "And there's nothin' like a mad woman/ What a shame she went mad/ No one likes a mad woman/ You made her like that". The lyrics of "Mad Woman" criticize how women are persistently mocked by men and society, as well as other women, and address their struggle to defend themselves against their aggressors.

"Mad Woman" also references witch hunts and Swift's song "I Did Something Bad" (2017). Entertainment Weekly's Lauren Huff compared the track to her 2019 single "The Man": "Both songs tackle the ways in which women are defined, but where 'The Man' is broad in its complaints, 'Mad Woman' is more specific. Where 'The Man' is cheeky, 'Mad Woman' is dark, cynical, and angry." Some publications drew parallels between the song's narrative and Daenerys Targaryen's character arc in Game of Thrones, in which Targaryen is a powerful female character who vies for the throne and has another female character as her greatest enemy.

Several journalists speculated that "Mad Woman" was written about Swift's public 2019 dispute with Scooter Braun, who purchased the masters of her back catalog after acquiring her former record label, Big Machine Records, specifically for the lyric "I'm taking my time, taking my time/ 'Cause you took everything from me". (Note: Attributed to USA Today's Patrick Ryan, Seventeen's Kelsey Stiegman, Entertainment Weekly's Lauren Huff, Vulture's Justin Curto, and The Forty-Five's Rhian Daly) In an interview with Entertainment Weekly in December 2020, Swift confirmed that the track was inspired by the dispute.

== Release and live performances ==
"Mad Woman" is the twelfth track on Folklore, which was surprise-released on July 24, 2020. Swift recorded a stripped-down rendition of the song in September 2020 for the documentary film Folklore: The Long Pond Studio Sessions and its live album. She performed "Mad Woman" as a "surprise song" on piano twice on her sixth concert tour, the Eras Tour (2023–2024). On April 15, 2023, she played the track with Dessner at the third Tampa show of the tour. Swift performed it as part of a medley with her songs "Cassandra" (2024) and "I Did Something Bad" at the fifth Toronto show of the tour on November 22, 2024. Rolling Stone journalists picked the medley performance as one of the 40 best moments from the tour.

== Critical reception ==
Music critics generally praised "Mad Woman" for its concept and illustration of social and gender issues. Anna Leszkiewicz from the New Statesman deemed it one of Swift's most "self-examining" tracks, and Alexandra Lang of Dallas Observer complimented her for writing about systemic social problems and thought that "the contrast of the softer melody with the biting lyrics illustrates the fine line that women are expected to tread with their emotions." Roisin O'Connor of The Independent deemed "Mad Woman" a continuation of Swift's "vengeful streak", but unlike "Look What You Made Me Do" (2017), her anger "now doesn't sound so brittle". Courtney Larocca from Business Insider believed that it succeeded in demonstrating that "anger and pain can leave an indelible mark" and wrote that "for the first time, her rage sounds like freedom."

In less enthusiastic reviews, Business Insider's Callie Ahglrim wrote that although "Mad Woman" was generally intriguing, it was less creative and unique than the other Folklore tracks, and Beats Per Minute's John Wohlmacher thought that Swift's vocal performance lacked "emotional depth". "Mad Woman" appeared in rankings of Swift's discography by Variety's Chris Willman (54 out of 75), NME's Hannah Mylrea (58 out of 161), Vulture's Nate Jones (98 out of 245), and Rolling Stone's Rob Sheffield (101 out of 286).

== Commercial performance ==
In the United States, "Mad Woman" reached number 17 on the Rolling Stone Top 100 chart and number 47 on the Billboard Hot 100 chart. The track additionally entered at number 10 on the Billboard Hot Rock & Alternative chart, where it stayed for 12 weeks and appeared at number 46 on the chart's 2020 year-end. "Mad Woman" also reached the national charts of Australia (25), Singapore (25), Canada (38), and Portugal (162). It peaked at number 50 on the Audio Streaming chart in the United Kingdom. The track received a platinum certification in Australia, gold certifications in Brazil and New Zealand, and a silver certification in the United Kingdom.

== Personnel ==
Credits are adapted from the liner notes of Folklore.

- Taylor Swift – songwriter
- Aaron Dessner – songwriter, producer, recording engineer, drum programming, piano, acoustic guitar, electric guitar, bass guitar, synthesizer, percussion
- Jonathan Low – recording engineer
- Serban Ghenea – mixing engineer
- Randy Merrill – mastering engineer
- John Hanes – engineer
- James McAlister – beat programming, drums, synthesizers, hand percussion
- Clarice Jensen – cello
- Yuki Numata Resnick – viola, violin
- Kyle Resnick – viola recording, violin recording
- Bryce Dessner – orchestration

== Charts ==
=== Weekly charts ===
Chart performance for "Mad Woman"
Chart (2020)	Peak position
Australia (ARIA)	25
Canada Hot 100 (Billboard)	38
Portugal (AFP)	162
Singapore (RIAS)	25
UK Audio Streaming (Official Charts)	50
US Billboard Hot 100	47
US Hot Rock & Alternative Songs (Billboard)	10
US Rolling Stone Top 100	17

=== Year-end chart ===
Year-end chart performance for "Mad Woman"
Chart (2020)	Position
US Hot Rock & Alternative Songs (Billboard)	46

== Certifications ==
Certifications for "Mad Woman"
Region	Certification	Certified units/sales
Australia (ARIA)	Platinum	70,000^{‡}
Brazil (Pro-Música Brasil)	Gold	20,000^{‡}
New Zealand (RMNZ)	Gold	15,000^{‡}
United Kingdom (BPI)	Silver	200,000^{‡}
^{‡} Sales+streaming figures based on certification alone.
