= Castles Crumbling =

2023 song by Taylor Swift featuring Hayley Williams

Song by Taylor Swift featuring Hayley Williams of Paramore

from the album Speak Now (Taylor's Version)
- Released: July 7, 2023
- Studio: Electric Lady (New York City); Rough Customer (Brooklyn Heights)
- Genre: Emo; indie folk
- Length: 5:06
- Label: Republic
- Songwriter: Taylor Swift
- Producers: Taylor Swift; Jack Antonoff

Lyric video
- "Castles Crumbling" on YouTube

"Castles Crumbling" (Note: Officially titled "Castles Crumbling (Taylor's Version) (From the Vault)") is a song written and recorded by the American singer-songwriter Taylor Swift, featuring the American singer-songwriter Hayley Williams. Swift wrote the track and intended to include it in her third studio album, Speak Now (2010), but left it out of the track-list. She produced the track with Jack Antonoff for the re-recording of Speak Now, the 2023 album Speak Now (Taylor's Version). "Castles Crumbling" is a piano-driven emo and indie folk ballad, and its lyrics are about the pressure of fame.

Music critics interpreted that "Castles Crumbling" was influenced by the incident involving Swift and the rapper Kanye West at the 2009 MTV Video Music Awards. They gave the song generally positive reviews and described its nature as delicate. The song peaked in the top 40 on the Billboard Global 200 and on the charts in Australia, New Zealand, and the United States. Swift performed it live twice on the Eras Tour, once in 2023, and the other time in 2024.

== Background and release ==
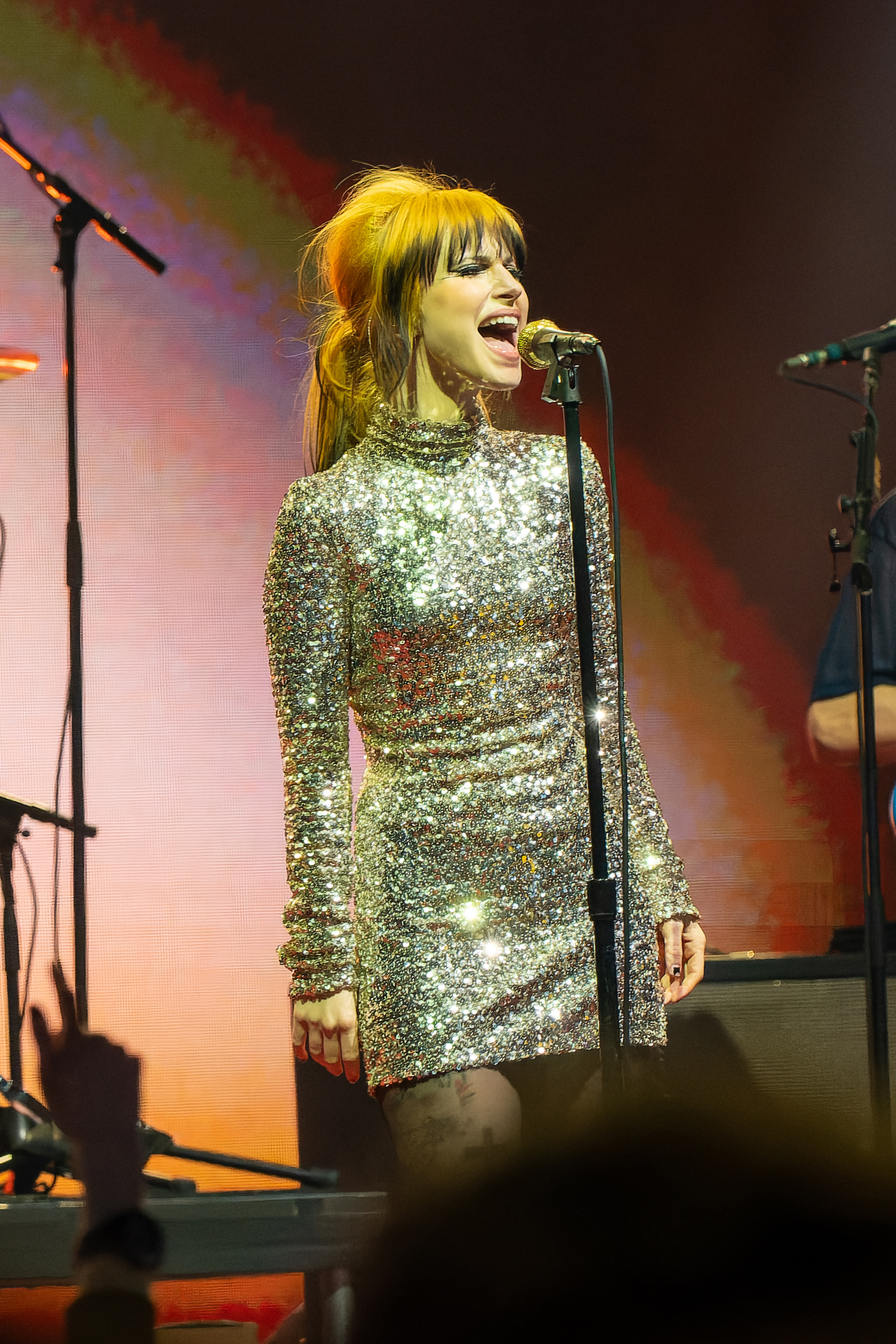
Hayley Williams (pictured) featured on "Castles Crumbling".

Taylor Swift's third studio album, Speak Now, was released on October 25, 2010, by Big Machine Records. She left Big Machine to sign with Republic Records in 2018. In 2019, the music executive Scooter Braun acquired Big Machine, including the masters to Swift's first six studio albums, including Speak Now. She denounced Braun's purchase and began re-recording the albums in November 2020, to own their masters herself. The re-recording of Speak Now, titled Speak Now (Taylor's Version), was released on July 7, 2023.

In addition to re-recorded versions of the songs on the original album, Speak Now (Taylor's Version) contains six previously-unreleased "From the Vault" tracks that Swift had written for but left out of the track-list. Hayley Williams, the frontwoman of the rock band Paramore and a friend of Swift, was one of the influences on Swift's songwriting on Speak Now. According to a statement on Swift's social media, this was a factor that made Swift choose Williams as a collaborator for Speak Now (Taylor's Version). In a July 2023 interview with Coup de Main magazine, Williams expressed her gratitude and enjoyment of the track because she thought it portrayed an experience that both she and Swift went through.

On July 28, 2023, Swift performed the song live during an Eras Tour show in Santa Clara, California, as a "surprise song" outside the regular setlist. CBS News called the performance "show stopping", while The Ringer placed it as the tenth best "surprise song" set of the tour. She sang it again this time with Williams at an Eras Tour show in London on June 23, 2024. "Castles Crumbling" debuted at number 31 on the Billboard Hot 100; this expanded Swift's amount of top-40 entries to 119. The song was Williams's first entry on the US Hot Country Songs chart, peaking at number 13. The song entered charts in Canada (42), Australia (33), and New Zealand (30), and it peaked at number 30 on the Billboard Global 200.

== Music and lyrics ==
"Castles Crumbling"
A sample of the song's outro, in which both singers harmonize over a piano-led track

"Castles Crumbling" has a length of five minutes and six seconds. Swift wrote the song herself and produced it with Jack Antonoff. It was mixed by Serban Ghenea and mastered by Randy Merrill. "Castles Crumbling" is an emo and indie folk ballad led by a piano line. The first verse is performed by Swift, while Williams sings the second. The two singers perform the chorus together, and they harmonize with each other during the song's outro. Mikael Wood from Los Angeles Times compared the song's soundscape to indie folk sound of Folklore and Evermore (both 2020).

During the development of Speak Now, Swift was under public scrutiny, with her love life being the subject of mainstream media gossip, and the singer's transition from country music to pop music receiving skeptical opinions—sentiment she carries over the first verse of "Castles Crumbling". Various critics and fans drew a connection between it and Kanye West's interruption of Swift's acceptance speech at the 2009 MTV Video Music Awards. Maura Johnston, in a review for Rolling Stone, drew comparison between the themes of "Castles Crumbling" and "Innocent", a Speak Now track released in 2010 that also addressed the MTV incident. Some publications thought that Swift referenced its title in the opening line of the song "Call It What You Want" ("My castle crumbled overnight") from Swift's 2017 album Reputation.

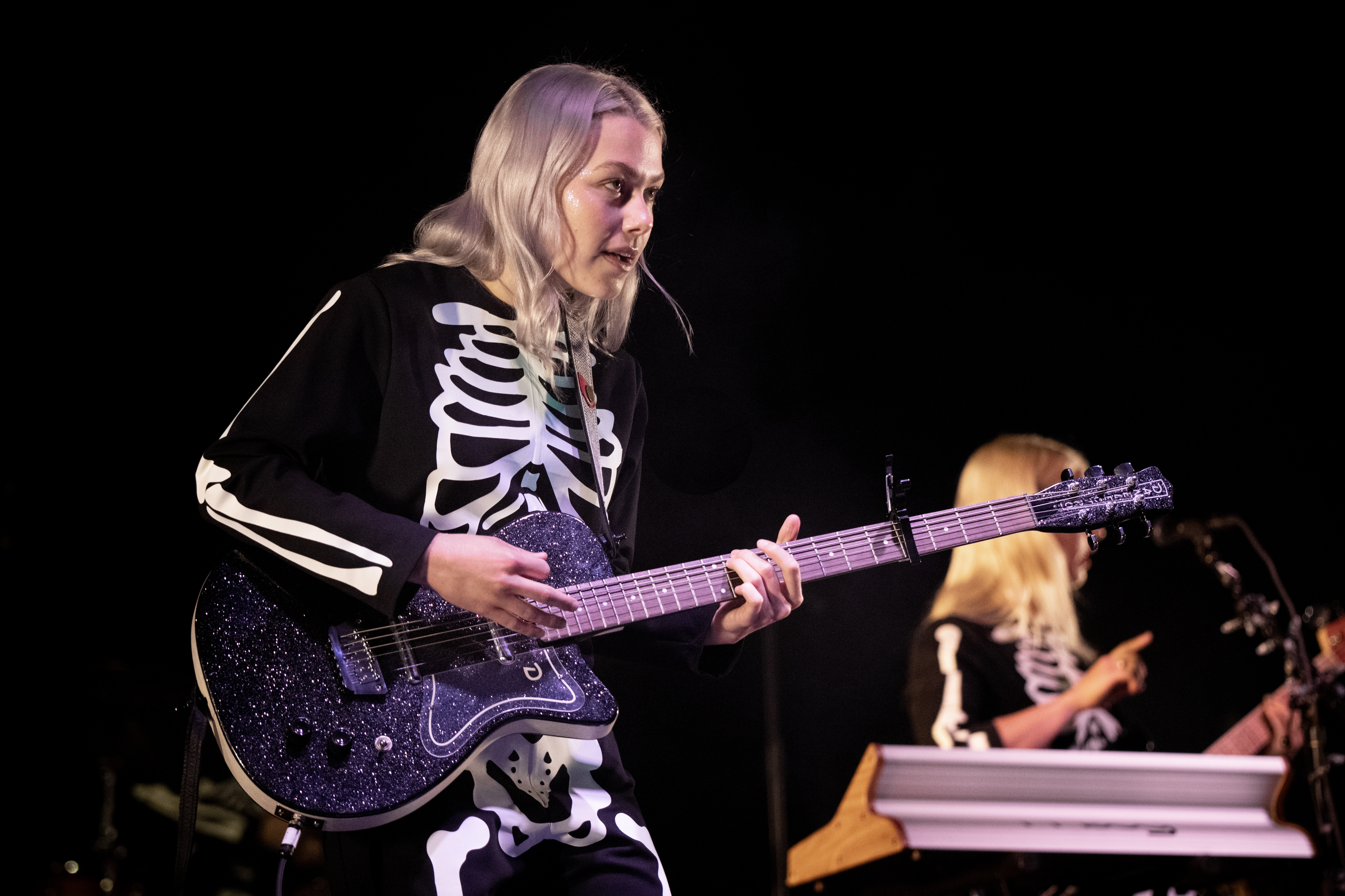
Some critics compared the lyrics of "Castles Crumbling" to those of Swift's 2021 track "Nothing New" featuring Phoebe Bridgers (pictured).

The chorus sees Swift ensuring someone to not get involved in a relationship with her. Uproxx writer Flisadam Pointer opined that it might be a nod to Swift's fans, as she assumes that their support for her can be fragile. The second verse featuring vocals from Williams has lyrics, "Once, I was the great hope for a dynasty/Crowds would hang on my words and they trusted me", which Glamour UK editor Suzanne Cordeiro thought to metaphorize Swift's early-career role in bringing country music to a younger generation. Bustle journalist Jake Viswanath meanwhile wrote that the said lyrics illustrate how small missteps might have a catastrophic influence over someone's career, a narrative that continues through the pre-chorus: "Power went to my head and I couldn't stop/Ones I loved tried to help, so I ran them off."

Some fans of Swift thought "Castles Crumbling" was a "dark sister" of "Long Live", a Speak Now track that is about Swift's promise to her fans that "we will be remembered". Various publications pointed out how the lyrics of "Castles Crumbling" parallel with those from Swift's sixth studio album, Reputation, as both address themes surrounding reputation and "[falling] from grace". Others compared "Castles Crumbling" to "Nothing New", a vault track included on Red (Taylor's Version) (2021) featuring Phoebe Bridgers, since it is a self-written piece with a guest vocals from female friend, "[grappling] with a particular kind of self-doubt, caused by the glare of a spotlight in her eyes" as put by Callie Alhgrim from Business Insider. The theme of "self-loathing" also received comparisons to other songs by Swift: "The Archer" from Lover (2019), "Mirrorball" from Folklore (2020) and "Anti-Hero" from Midnights (2022).

== Critical reception ==
In The Daily Telegraph, Poppie Plat said that listeners who expected the Swift–Williams collaboration might be disappointed by the "somewhat saccharine tone" but picked it as a standout and said it was a "perfect companion" to other ballads such as "Enchanted" and "Last Kiss". Kelsey Barnes from The Line of Best Fit agreed and said that the production resembles Williams's solo projects. Additionally, Parade's Jessica Sager noted that the title might be a nod to Paramore's "Brick By Boring Brick" (2009), within which Williams sings "bury the castle". Maura Johnston of Rolling Stone described it as a "gauzy surveying of a ruined personal landscape". Laura Snapes from The Guardian said it is a "crestfallen, delicate song" and a "prescient song for Swift to have written at the outset of her imperial phase".

Labeling the track as "a duet for the ages", British Rolling Stone critic Mark Sutherland praise how the singers' voices "gorgeously intertwin[e] as they wrestle with the fear that the cheers may one day turn to jeers". Consequence's Mary Siroky named "Castles Crumbling" the song of the week, writing that it is "a soft — but poignant — reclamation of the narrative". In the article published on Spin, Bobby Olivier opined that it is a "stronger" duet offered in Speak Now (Taylor's Version) than "Electric Touch", a collaboration with the band Fall Out Boy, calling it a "deliciously emo piano burner". Despite placing the song last on his ranking of the album's "From the Vault" tracks, Jason Lipshutz of Billboard wrote that the production is "brimming with ethereal voices and Swift and Williams maintaining mournful attitudes as they examine their personal wreckage".

== Credits and personnel ==
Credits are adapted from the liner notes of Speak Now (Taylor's Version).

Studios

- Recorded at Electric Lady Studios (New York City) and Rough Customer Studio (Brooklyn)
- Mixed at MixStar Studios, Virginia Beach, Virginia
- Mastered at Sterling Sound, Edgewater, New Jersey
- Mikey Freedom Hart's performance recorded by himself and David Hart at Big Mercy Sound (Brooklyn)
- Sean Hutchinson's performance recorded by himself at Hutchinson Sound (Brooklyn)
- Evan Smith's performance recorded by himself at Pleasure Hill Recording (Portland, Maine)
- Bobby Hawk's performance recorded by Jon Gautier at Sound House Studios (Lakeland, Florida)
- Swift's vocals recorded by Christopher Rowe at Kitty Committee Studio (London)

Personnel

- Taylor Swift – vocals, songwriting, production
- Hayley Williams – vocals
- Jack Antonoff – production, engineering, programming, acoustic guitar, bass guitar, electric guitar, drums, piano, synthesizer
- Bobby Hawk – violin
- Eric Byers – cello
- Evan Smith – flute, saxophone, engineering
- Mikey Freedom Hart – synthesizer
- Sean Hutchinson – drums, percussion
- David Hart – engineering
- Laura Sisk – engineering
- John Rooney – engineering assistance
- Jon Sher – engineering assistance
- Megan Searl – engineering assistance
- Christopher Rowe – vocal engineering, vocal recording
- Taylor York – vocal engineering, vocal recording
- Serban Ghenea – mixing
- Bryce Bordone – mix engineering
- Randy Merrill – mastering

== Charts ==
Chart performance
Chart (2023)	Peak position
Australia (ARIA)	33
Canada Hot 100 (Billboard)	42
Global 200 (Billboard)	30
Greece International (IFPI)	87
New Zealand (Recorded Music NZ)	30
UK Audio Streaming (Official Charts)	54
US Billboard Hot 100	31
US Hot Country Songs (Billboard)	13

== Certification ==
Certification
Region	Certification	Certified units/sales
Brazil (Pro-Música Brasil)	Gold	20,000^{‡}
^{‡} Sales+streaming figures based on certification alone.
