= Speak Now (Taylor's Version) =

2023 re-recorded album by Taylor Swift

Studio album (re-recorded) by Taylor Swift
- Released: July 7, 2023
- Studios: Blackbird (Nashville); The Clubhouse (Rhinebeck, New York); Electric Lady (New York City); Long Pond (Hudson Valley); Rough Customer (Brooklyn); Rue Boyer (Paris)
- Genres: Country pop; pop rock
- Length: 104:33
- Label: Republic
- Producers: Taylor Swift; Christopher Rowe; Aaron Dessner; Jack Antonoff

Taylor Swift chronology
| Lover (Live from Paris) (2023) | Speak Now (Taylor's Version) (2023) | 1989 (Taylor's Version) (2023) |

Speak Now (Taylor's Version) is the third re-recorded album by the American singer-songwriter Taylor Swift. It was released on July 7, 2023, through Republic Records, as part of Swift's re-recording project following the 2019 dispute over the master recordings of her back catalog. The album is a re-recording of Swift's third studio album, Speak Now (2010). She announced the re-recording at the first Nashville concert of her sixth concert tour, the Eras Tour, on May 5, 2023.

Speak Now (Taylor's Version) consists of songs written solely by Swift. She produced the re-recorded versions of 16 tracks from the deluxe edition of Speak Now with Christopher Rowe, and six previously unreleased "From the Vault" tracks with Jack Antonoff and Aaron Dessner. Two vault tracks respectively feature Fall Out Boy and Hayley Williams. A country pop and pop rock album, Speak Now (Taylor's Version) incorporates various rock styles such as emo, pop-punk, and alternative rock. Its sound is characterized by prominent electric guitars, dynamic drums, and strings. Reflecting Swift's adolescence, the songs document emotions of affection, grievance, and heartbreak, forming a loose concept album of unspoken confessions.

Music critics praised Swift's emotionally engaging songwriting in the album and the matured tone of her vocal performances, although the alteration to a lyric in the track "Better than Revenge" had a mixed response. Speak Now (Taylor's Version) reached number one on the album charts of Australia, Canada, Spain, Sweden, and the United Kingdom, among others. In the United States, it was Swift's 12th album to top the Billboard 200 chart, breaking Barbra Streisand's all-time record for the most number-one albums by a female artist. It was later certified four-times platinum by the Recording Industry Association of America. All 22 of its tracks charted on the Billboard Hot 100, with "I Can See You", which was accompanied by a music video, becoming the highest-peaking at number five.

== Background ==
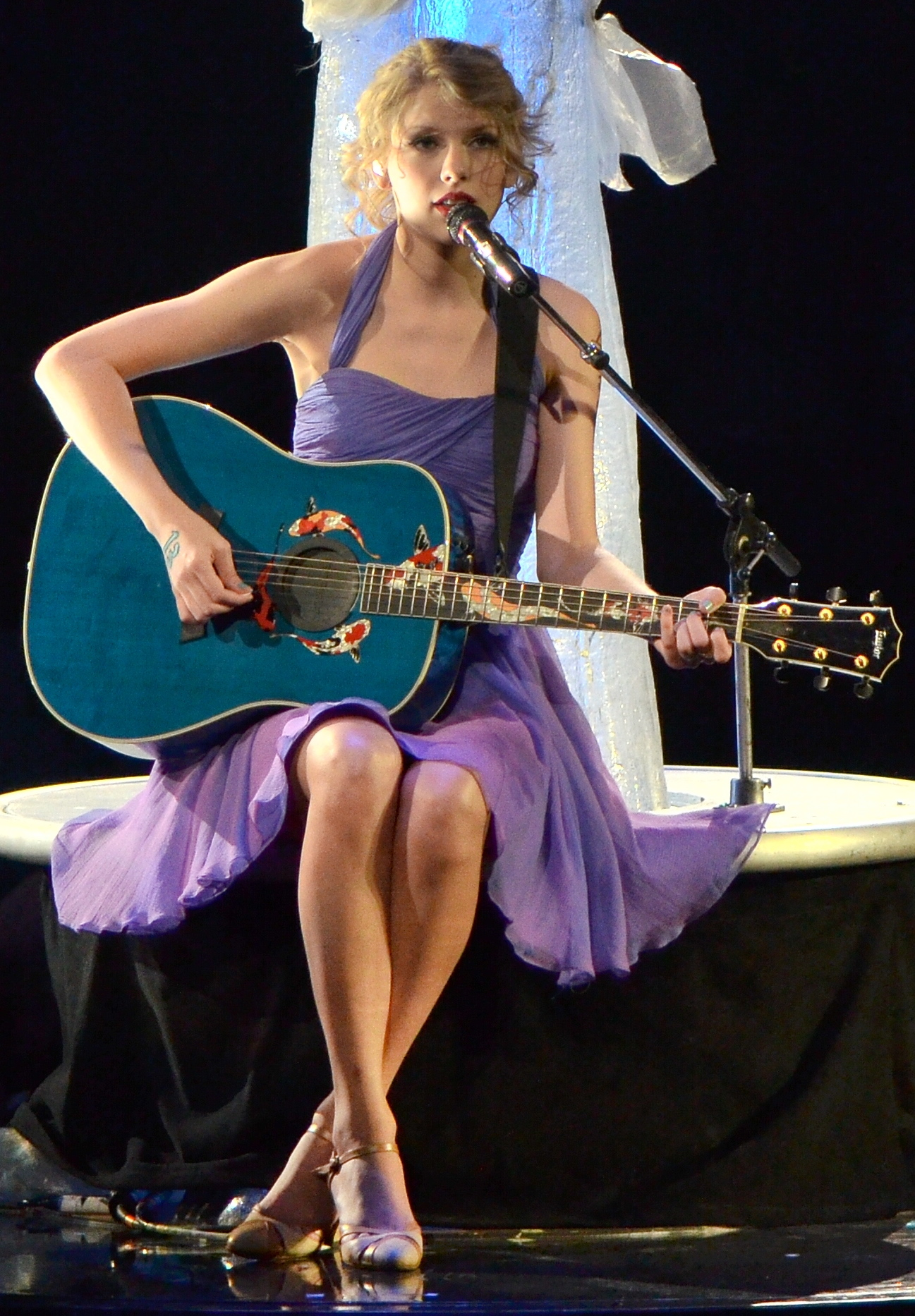
Swift performing on the Speak Now World Tour (2011–2012)

Taylor Swift signed a recording contract with Big Machine Records, an independent record label based in Nashville, in 2005. As part of the contract, Big Machine released Swift's first six studio albums, from Taylor Swift (2006) to Reputation (2017). Swift wrote the standard edition of her third studio album, Speak Now, entirely herself and produced it with Nathan Chapman, who had produced both of her previous albums. The album was released on October 25, 2010, by Big Machine. It expands on the country pop style of her past albums with more aggressive elements of mainstream pop and rock styles from the 1970s and 1980s, such as pop rock, arena rock, and new wave rock. Speak Now registered in the 2010 Guinness World Records as the fastest-selling US digital album by a female artist and was nominated for Best Country Album at the 54th Grammy Awards in 2012. The New York Times wrote in 2010 that the album's strong sales proved Swift "has transcended the limitations of genre and become a pop megastar".

By August 2018, Swift's contract with Big Machine had expired; she signed a new contract with Republic Records, a division of Universal Music Group, which secured her the rights to own the masters of the new music she would release. In 2019, the talent manager Scooter Braun and his company, Ithaca Holdings, acquired Big Machine Records. The masters of Swift's Big Machine-released albums were effectively transferred to Braun, which resulted in a public dispute between Swift and Braun. Swift denounced the purchase and began re-recording her first six studio albums in November 2020. By re-recording the albums, Swift had full ownership of the new masters, which enabled her to control the licensing of her songs for commercial use and therefore substituted the Big Machine–owned masters.

Swift released the first two re-recorded albums in 2021: Fearless (Taylor's Version) in April and Red (Taylor's Version) in November; the former is the re-recording of Swift's second studio album, Fearless (2008), and the latter is of her fourth, Red (2012). In addition to reproduced versions of the original songs subtitled "Taylor's Version", each album includes several previously unreleased tracks denoted as "From the Vault". (Note: This article refers to these tracks as "vault tracks" hereafter for concision.) After their release, both re-recorded albums performed better in commercial metrics than their original counterparts did. At the first Nashville show of her sixth headlining concert tour, the Eras Tour, on May 5, 2023, Swift announced the third installment in her re-recording project, Speak Now (Taylor's Version).

== Music and lyrics ==
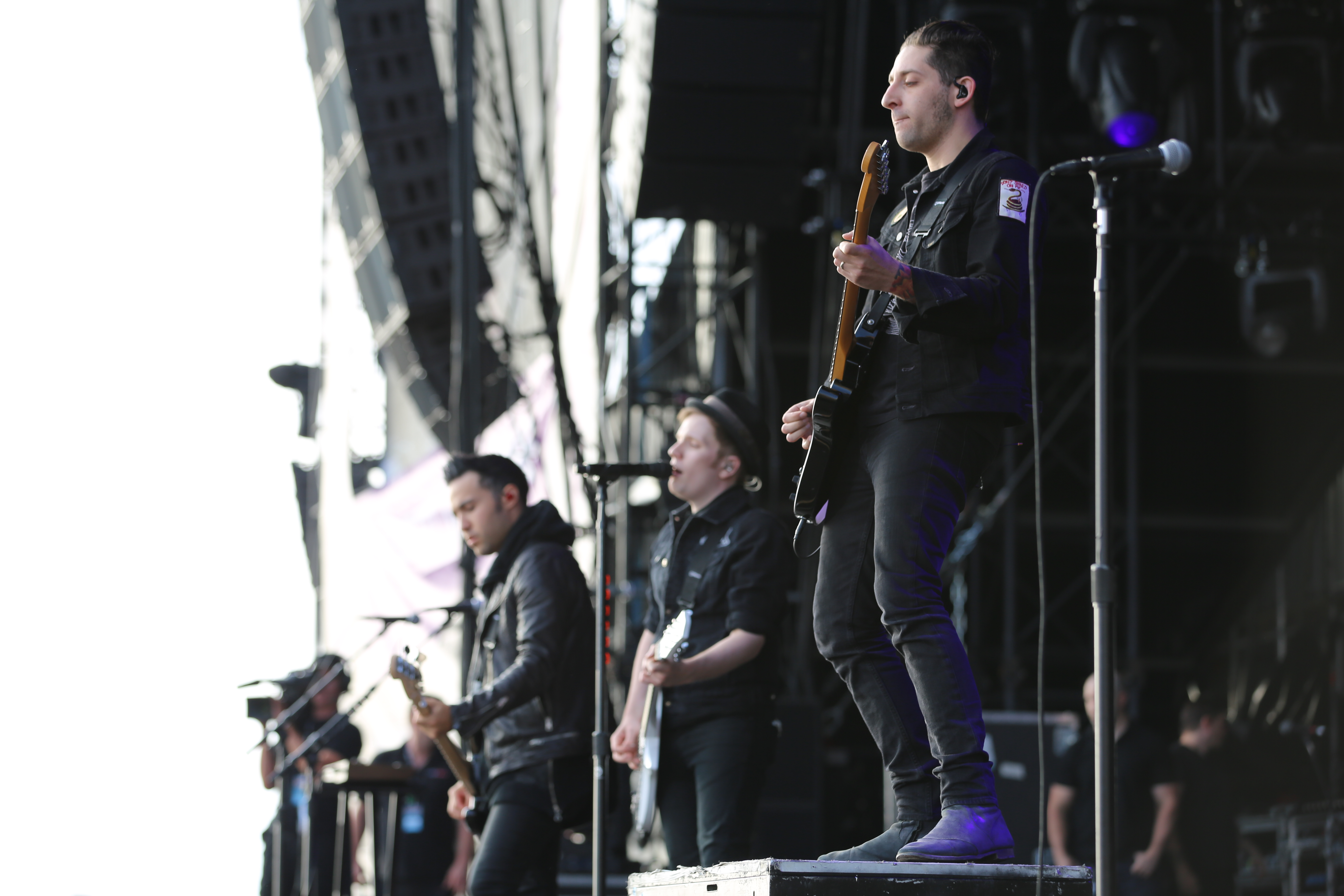
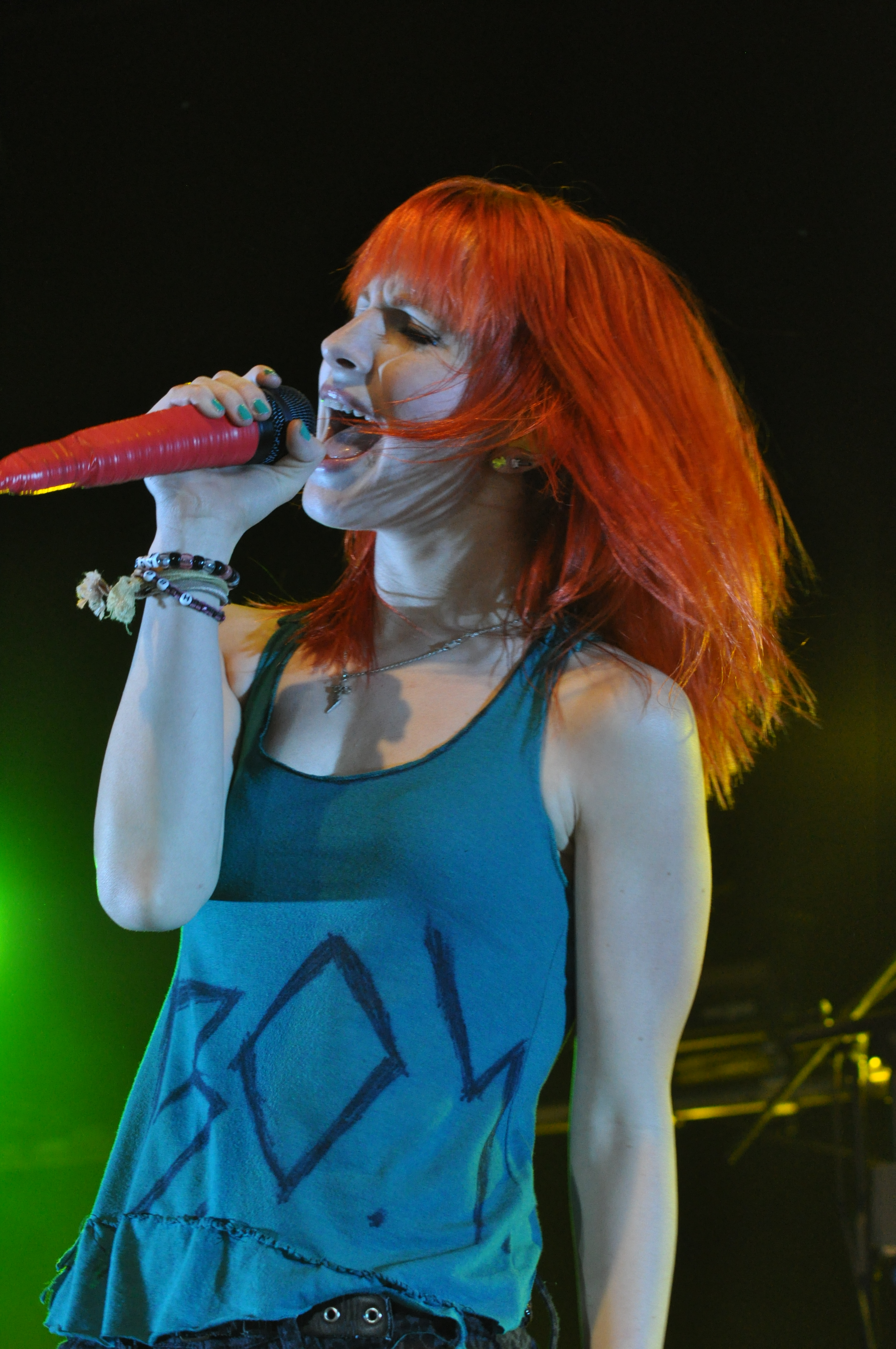
Fall Out Boy (left) and Hayley Williams (right) feature on the vault tracks "Electric Touch" and "Castles Crumbling", respectively.

=== Composition ===
Speak Now (Taylor's Version) contains 22 tracks written solely by Swift, 16 of which are re-recorded versions of songs from the 2010 deluxe edition of Speak Now, save for "If This Was a Movie", which was re-recorded and released separately. Six tracks were denoted as "From the Vault", which Swift had written and intended to include in the original album but ultimately did not. Fall Out Boy features on the vault track "Electric Touch", and Hayley Williams on "Castles Crumbling".

Swift shared via social media that re-recording Speak Now made her reminisce about it as an album that "tells a tale of growing up, flailing, flying and crashing ... and living to speak about it", influenced by her adolescence to encapsulate "brutal honesty, unfiltered diaristic confessions and wild wistfulness". The songs on Speak Now (Taylor's Version) reflect on Swift's transition from adolescence to adulthood; they employ autobiographical songwriting to explore the sentiments stemming from love and life, such as enchantment, heartbreak, and teenage angst. Some songs were inspired by Swift's celebrity. They altogether constitute a loose concept of unspoken things Swift wanted to deliver to the subjects of her songs. All re-recorded tracks retain their original lyrics, except "Better than Revenge", whose line "She's better known for the things that she does on the mattress" in the chorus was replaced with "He was a moth to the flame, she was holding the matches".

Swift produced all tracks on Speak Now (Taylor's Version). The re-recorded tracks were produced with Christopher Rowe, and the vault tracks with Aaron Dessner and Jack Antonoff, who were each credited on three tracks. Speak Now (Taylor's Version) is a country pop and pop rock album. It incorporates elements of various rock styles, such as pop-punk, emo, and alternative rock. In the re-recorded version, all of the original tracks are heavier compared to the original. Clash's Alex Berry described the album as a blend of rock, country, and pop, and Spin's Bobby Olivier attributed the rock sounds to the production elements of "rousing electric guitars, heavier drums, volatile choruses". In Rolling Stone, Maura Johnston said that Swift's songwriting exhibits country roots while drawing influences from the pop-rock sound popular around the time she was writing the original album; this idea was shared by Variety's Chris Willman, who described the overall sound Swift was pursuing as "the organic pop-rock band sound" that captured "the stylistic spirit of 2010".

=== "From the Vault" tracks ===
"I Can See You"
"I Can See You" incorporates rock elements demonstrated by its rhythmic electric guitar.

"Electric Touch" featuring Fall Out Boy is a pop rock and pop-punk track that is instrumented by electric guitar riffs and crescendoing drums. In it, Swift duets with Fall Out Boy's frontman, Patrick Stump. The lyrics are about the conflicting feelings such as anxieties, pessimism, excitement, hope, and self-doubt over a newfound romance. "When Emma Falls in Love" is a mellow piano ballad that also incorporates banjo, exhibiting elements of country and pop. In the lyrics, Swift's character observes a friend's love life and character. "I Can See You" has a groove that is instrumented by a rhythmic electric guitar, featuring elements of indie rock and surf rock. The lyrics contain sexually suggestive innuendos.

"Castles Crumbling" is a duet between Swift and Williams. It is a piano ballad about dealing with the pressures of fame and potentially losing the interest of fans. "Foolish One" is about self-criticism for one's naivety in love. It is a country pop song driven by acoustic guitar strums and programmed drums. In the closing ballad "Timeless", Swift finds old photos of couples in an antique shop and superimposes herself in their lives, imagining herself longing for a lover who has gone to war. The song's arrangement mainly consists of acoustic guitars and organ, with accents of ukulele and flute.

== Release ==
After a month of the album's announcement, Swift unveiled its track listing via social media on June 5, 2023. On June 9, the French newspaper Ouest-France reported that a temporary worker from Le Mans, France, was arrested for stealing 10 vinyl records of Speak Now (Taylor's Version) from a warehouse and selling them on Leboncoin, a classified ads website. The worker was sentenced to eight months in prison. The public prosecutor stated that only the eight unsold LPs were retrieved from the worker; the whereabouts of the two sold copies remain unknown.

Swift released a snippet of the re-recorded version of "Mine" via social media on June 24, and "Back to December" in the trailer for the Amazon Prime Video series The Summer I Turned Pretty on June 29. Speak Now (Taylor's Version) was released on July 7, 2023. The standard vinyl edition of Speak Now (Taylor's Version) is a set of three marbled violet LP records. Two additional lilac and orchid marbled variants were also released. Universal Music Japan released two Japanese exclusive physical versions, a standard CD and a deluxe 7–inch jacket, on August 16, 2023.

When the album was released on July 7, Swift premiered the music video for "I Can See You" at the first Kansas City show on the Eras Tour. The following day, it was released to her YouTube channel. Directed and written by Swift, the video stars her alongside Taylor Lautner, Joey King, and Presley Cash; the latter two previously appeared in Swift's video for "Mean" (2011). On July 13, 2023, Swift released a digital deluxe edition of the album, featuring live recordings of "Dear John" and "Last Kiss" from the Minneapolis and Kansas City shows of the Eras Tour, respectively.

== Critical reception ==
Professional ratings
Aggregate scores
| Source | Rating |
|---|---|
| AnyDecentMusic? | 7.6/10 |
| Metacritic | 81/100 |
Review scores
| Source | Rating |
| AllMusic | 4/5 stars |
| American Songwriter | 4.5/5 stars |
| Clash | 8/10 |
| The Daily Telegraph | 4/5 stars |
| The Guardian | 3/5 stars |
| The Independent | 4/5 stars |
| Pitchfork | 7.5/10 |
| Rolling Stone | 4/5 stars |
| Slant Magazine | 4/5 stars |
| The Times | 4/5 stars |

Speak Now (Taylor's Version) was met with widespread critical acclaim. On Metacritic, which assigns a weighted average based on ratings from publications, the album scored 81 out of 100 based on 14 reviews, indicating "universal acclaim". AnyDecentMusic? compiled 13 reviews and gave the album a score of 7.6 out of 10, based on their assessment of the critical consensus.

Maura Johnston of Rolling Stone stated, Speak Now (Taylor's Version) "expands our image of a landmark album," with grittier production quality. The same magazine's UK critic Mark Sutherland wrote, "the empowering, elemental force and simmering hurt that made the original Speak Now such a remarkable record remains strikingly intact." Reviews from Annabel Nugent of The Independent, Poppie Platt of The Daily Telegraph, Jonathan Keefe of Slant Magazine, Rachel Caroll of PopMatters, Stephen Thomas Erlewine of AllMusic, and Will Hodgkinson of The Times praised the album's crisper production mix, emotional heft, added nuance of the vault songs, and Swift's strong and refined vocals. Alex Hopper of American Songwriter and Kelsey Barnes of The Line of Best Fit complimented the album's catharsis for an accurate portrayal of adolescence. Spin critic Bobby Olivier admired the album's "rock elegance" and Swift's "mature and textured vocal performance".

The lyric change in "Better than Revenge" was a common point of contention in reviews, with some calling it unnecessary. Others appreciated the change, opining that it is in line with Swift's changed perspective as a grown woman. The Guardian's Laura Snapes and Pitchfork's Vrinda Jagota said that Swift's voice, despite being "much richer" than in 2010, has lost its "youthful twang" and "teenage angst," but nevertheless considered the album's evolved songwriting and musical consistency impressive.

== Commercial performance ==
Speak Now (Taylor's Version) made Swift surpass Barbra Streisand (pictured) as the female artist with the most number-one albums on the Billboard 200.

Upon release, Speak Now (Taylor's Version) broke the record for the most single-day streams for a country album on Spotify. In the United States, it spent two weeks atop the Billboard 200 and became Swift's 12th number-one album. Its first-week figures consisted of 716,000 album-equivalent units, including 507,000 sales, earning the largest week for a country album since December 2014. Swift set new records among female artists for the most number-one albums in chart history (12) and the most consecutive years with a new number-one album (5), surpassing Barbra Streisand and Miley Cyrus, respectively. In the week that Speak Now (Taylor's Version) debuted atop the chart, Swift became the first woman to chart four albums in the top 10 the same week, (Note: Midnights, Lover, and Folklore charted at numbers five, seven, and 10, respectively.) the first woman and living soloist to chart 11 albums simultaneously (after the Beatles and Prince), (Note: Red (Taylor's Version), 1989, Reputation, Fearless (Taylor's Version), Evermore, the 2010 version of Speak Now, and Taylor Swift charted at numbers 18, 19, 21, 23, 38, 67, and 138, respectively.) and the first act to have nine albums each sell at least 500,000 copies in one week. All 22 tracks from Speak Now (Taylor's Version) debuted on the Billboard Hot 100, bringing Swift's total career entries to 212 songs. The album marked Swift's eighth number one on the Top Country Albums chart, and all tracks charted on the Hot Country Songs, with seven in the top 10.

Speak Now (Taylor's Version) debuted at number one on the UK Albums Chart with 67,000 units, surpassing the 2010 album's peak (number six) and doubling its first-week sales. Swift became the fastest female artist to collect 10 number-one albums in the United Kingdom, surpassing Madonna. In Australia, Speak Now (Taylor's Version) debuted atop the ARIA Albums Chart, displacing Swift's Midnights (2022) from the top spot. It became Swift's 11th number-one album and made her the first act to replace themselves at the top spot. Elsewhere, the album reached number one in Argentina, Belgian Flanders, Canada, Ireland, the Netherlands, New Zealand, Spain, and Sweden.

== Recognition ==
On July 10, the Washington, D.C. branch of the U.S. Federal Bureau of Investigation (FBI) issued a mock Speak Now (Taylor's Version) back cover encouraging social media users to submit tips regarding possible criminal activity, replacing track titles with offenses such as terrorism, cybercrime, counterintelligence, civil rights, public corruption, weapons of mass destruction, organized crime, violent crime and white-collar crime. To honor a record six sold-out shows of the Eras Tour at the SoFi Stadium, the Grammy Museum at L.A. Live hosted a pop-up exhibit from August 2 to September 18, 2023, displaying 11 of Swift's costumes and two of her music instruments from the "I Can See You" music video. At the 2023 Billboard Music Awards, Speak Now (Taylor's Version) was nominated for Top Country Album but lost to Morgan Wallen's One Thing at a Time.

== Track listing ==
All tracks are written by Taylor Swift, and produced by Swift and Christopher Rowe, except where noted.

Speak Now (Taylor's Version) track listing
| No. | Title | Length |
|---|---|---|
| 1. | "Mine" | 3:51 |
| 2. | "Sparks Fly" | 4:21 |
| 3. | "Back to December" | 4:54 |
| 4. | "Speak Now" | 4:02 |
| 5. | "Dear John" | 6:45 |
| 6. | "Mean" | 3:58 |
| 7. | "The Story of Us" | 4:27 |
| 8. | "Never Grow Up" | 4:52 |
| 9. | "Enchanted" | 5:53 |
| 10. | "Better than Revenge" | 3:40 |
| 11. | "Innocent" | 5:01 |
| 12. | "Haunted" | 4:05 |
| 13. | "Last Kiss" | 6:09 |
| 14. | "Long Live" | 5:17 |
| 15. | "Ours" | 3:55 |
| 16. | "Superman" | 4:34 |
| 17. | "Electric Touch" (featuring Fall Out Boy) (produced by Swift and Aaron Dessner) | 4:26 |
| 18. | "When Emma Falls in Love" (produced by Swift and Dessner) | 4:12 |
| 19. | "I Can See You" (produced by Swift and Jack Antonoff) | 4:33 |
| 20. | "Castles Crumbling" (featuring Hayley Williams) (produced by Swift and Antonoff) | 5:06 |
| 21. | "Foolish One" (produced by Swift and Dessner) | 5:11 |
| 22. | "Timeless" (produced by Swift and Antonoff) | 5:21 |
| Total length: | | 104:33 |

=== Notes ===
- Tracks 1–22 are subtitled "Taylor's Version"; and tracks 17–22 are additionally subtitled "From The Vault".
- The album's CD package consists of two discs; one containing tracks 1–16, and the other with tracks 17–22.
- The re-recording of "If This Was a Movie", a track on the deluxe edition of the original album, was not included but instead released separately on digital platforms under Fearless (Taylor's Version)'s umbrella to celebrate the start of The Eras Tour.

== Personnel ==
Musicians

- Taylor Swift – vocals (all tracks), background vocals (1–16)
- Mike Meadows – acoustic guitar (1–16), background vocals (1–3, 5, 7, 8, 11, 13–16, 18), Hammond B3 (1–3, 5, 7, 12, 14, 16), mandolin (2, 3, 6, 7, 12, 16), clapping (4, 6), organ (4), banjo (6), keyboards (9), electric guitar (10)
- Amos Heller – bass guitar (1–7, 9–16), clapping (4, 6)
- Matt Billingslea – drums, percussion (1–7, 9–16); clapping (4, 6), vibraphone (5)
- Max Bernstein – electric guitar (1–6, 10–12, 14, 16), synthesizer (1, 5, 7, 11, 14), synth pads (3), acoustic guitar (7, 13), strings (11), keyboards (15)
- Paul Sidoti – slide guitar (1), electric guitar (2–7, 9–16), acoustic guitar (3, 6), ukulele (15)
- David Cook – piano (2, 5, 11, 12–14)
- Jonathan Yudkin – fiddle (2, 6)
- London Contemporary Orchestra (Note: The London Contemporary Orchestra consists of cellists Jonny Byers, Max Ruisi, and Oliver Coates; double bassist Dave Brown; violists Clifton Harrison, Matthew Kettle, Stephanie Edmundson, and Zoe Matthews; and violinists Anna Ovsyanikova, Anna de Bruin, Antonia Kesel, Charis Jenson, Charlotte Reid, Eloisa-Fleur Thorn, Galya Bisengalieva, Guy Button, Natalie Klouda, Nicole O'Donoghue, Nicole Stokes, and Zahra Benyounes.) – strings (3, 9, 12)
- Liz Huett – background vocals (4, 6, 7, 16)
- Caitlin Evanson – background vocals (6, 11, 14)
- Christopher Rowe – background vocals (9, 18, 22)
- Brian Pruitt – drum programming (10, 13, 14)
- Aaron Dessner – acoustic guitar, bass guitar, synthesizer (17, 18, 21); electric guitar (17, 18), percussion (17, 21), piano (18, 21), drum programming (21)
- Josh Kaufman – electric guitar, organ (17, 18, 21); piano (17, 21), acoustic guitar (17), banjo (18); keyboards, synthesizer (21)
- Thomas Bartlett – keyboards, piano, synthesizer (17)
- Benjamin Lanz – synthesizer (17, 18, 21)
- James McAlister – synthesizer (17, 18, 21); drums, percussion (18, 21); drum programming (21)
- Joe Russo – drums, percussion (17)
- Patrick Stump – electric guitar, vocals (17)
- James Krivchenia – drums (18), percussion (18)
- Jack Antonoff – acoustic guitar, bass guitar, electric guitar (19, 20, 22); programming, synthesizer (19, 20); 12-string acoustic guitar, background vocals, keyboards (19); drums, piano (20); Mellotron (22)
- Sean Hutchinson – drums, percussion (19, 20, 22)
- Mikey Freedom Hart – electric guitar (19), synthesizer (19, 20), Wurlitzer electronic piano (19)
- Evan Smith – saxophone (19, 20, 22), flute (20, 22); electric guitar, organ, synthesizer (22), ukulele (22)
- Eric Byers – cello (20)
- Bobby Hawk – violin (20)
- Hayley Williams – vocals (20)

Technical

- Randy Merrill – mastering
- Serban Ghenea – mixing (1–16, 19, 20, 22)
- Jonathan Low – mixing, engineering (17, 18, 21)
- David Payne – engineering (1–16)
- Derek Garten – editing, engineering, programmer (1–16)
- Jeremy Murphy – engineering (3, 9, 12)
- Aaron Dessner – engineering (17, 18, 21)
- David Hart – engineering (19, 20)
- Evan Smith – engineering (19, 20, 22)
- Jack Antonoff – engineering (19, 20, 22)
- Laura Sisk – engineering (19, 20, 22)
- Mikey Freedom Hart – engineering (19, 20)
- Sean Hutchinson – engineering (19, 20, 22)
- Eric Byers – engineering (20)
- Jon Gautier – engineering (20)
- Bryce Bordone – mix engineering (1–16, 19, 20, 22)
- Christopher Rowe – vocal engineering
- Taylor York – vocal engineering (20)
- Lowell Reynolds – editing, engineering assistance (1–16)
- Bella Blasko – additional engineering (17, 18)
- Benjamin Lanz – additional engineering (17, 18)
- James McAlister – additional engineering (17, 18)
- Thomas Bartlett – additional engineering (17)
- Patrick Stump – additional engineering (17)
- John Rooney – engineering assistance (19, 20, 22)
- Jon Sher – engineering assistance (19, 20, 22)
- Megan Searl – engineering assistance (19, 20, 22)

== Charts ==
=== Weekly charts ===
Weekly chart performance
| Chart (2023–2025) (Note: On the Austrian and German charts, after Speak Now (Taylor's Version) was released, the original Speak Now re-charted with statistics combined with the re-recording. The re-recording was separated into its own chart history in November 2023.) | Peak position |
|---|---|
| Argentine Albums (CAPIF) | 1 |
| Australian Albums (ARIA) | 1 |
| Australian Country Albums (ARIA) | 1 |
| Austrian Albums (Ö3 Austria) | 26 |
| Belgian Albums (Ultratop Flanders) | 1 |
| Belgian Albums (Ultratop Wallonia) | 2 |
| Canadian Albums (Billboard) | 1 |
| Croatian International Albums (HDU) | 1 |
| Czech Albums (ČNS IFPI) | 3 |
| Danish Albums (Hitlisten) | 6 |
| Dutch Albums (Album Top 100) | 1 |
| Finnish Albums (Suomen virallinen lista) | 6 |
| French Albums (SNEP) | 2 |
| German Albums (Offizielle Top 100) | 35 |
| Hungarian Albums (MAHASZ) | 3 |
| Icelandic Albums (Tónlistinn) | 3 |
| Irish Albums (IRMA) | 1 |
| Italian Albums (FIMI) | 4 |
| Japanese Albums (Oricon) | 11 |
| Japanese Combined Albums (Oricon) | 17 |
| Japanese Hot Albums (Billboard) | 9 |
| Lithuanian Albums (AGATA) | 10 |
| New Zealand Albums (RMNZ) | 1 |
| Norwegian Albums (VG-lista) | 2 |
| Polish Albums (ZPAV) | 3 |
| Scottish Albums (Official Charts) | 1 |
| Slovak Albums (ČNS IFPI) | 3 |
| Spanish Albums (Promusicae) | 1 |
| Swedish Albums (Sverigetopplistan) | 1 |
| UK Albums (Official Charts) | 1 |
| US Billboard 200 | 1 |
| US Top Country Albums (Billboard) | 1 |

=== Monthly charts ===
Monthly chart performance
| Chart (2023) | Peak position |
|---|---|
| Uruguayan Albums (CUD) | 1 |

=== Year-end charts ===
2023 year-end chart performance
| Chart (2023) | Position |
|---|---|
| Australian Albums (ARIA) | 7 |
| Belgian Albums (Ultratop Flanders) | 27 |
| Belgian Albums (Ultratop Wallonia) | 164 |
| Canadian Albums (Billboard) | 22 |
| Dutch Albums (Album Top 100) | 40 |
| French Albums (SNEP) | 123 |
| Hungarian Albums (MAHASZ) | 52 |
| New Zealand Albums (RMNZ) | 19 |
| Spanish Albums (PROMUSICAE) | 39 |
| UK Albums (OC) | 24 |
| US Billboard 200 | 11 |
| US Top Country Albums (Billboard) | 4 |

2024 year-end chart performance
| Chart (2024) | Position |
|---|---|
| Australian Albums (ARIA) | 39 |
| Australian Country Albums (ARIA) | 7 |
| Belgian Albums (Ultratop Flanders) | 70 |
| New Zealand Albums (RMNZ) | 39 |
| Portuguese Albums (AFP) | 170 |
| Spanish Albums (PROMUSICAE) | 72 |
| UK Albums (OC) | 88 |
| US Billboard 200 | 28 |
| US Top Country Albums (Billboard) | 6 |

2025 year-end chart performance
| Chart (2025) | Position |
|---|---|
| US Top Country Albums (Billboard) | 31 |

== Certifications ==
Certifications
| Region | Certification | Certified units/sales |
|---|---|---|
| Australia (ARIA) | Platinum | 70,000^{‡} |
| Austria (IFPI Austria) | Gold | 7,500^{‡} |
| Brazil (Pro-Música Brasil) | 2× Platinum | 80,000^{‡} |
| Canada (Music Canada) | 2× Platinum | 160,000^{‡} |
| Denmark (IFPI Danmark) | Gold | 10,000^{‡} |
| France (SNEP) | Gold | 50,000^{‡} |
| Italy (FIMI) | Gold | 25,000^{‡} |
| New Zealand (RMNZ) | Platinum | 15,000^{‡} |
| Poland (ZPAV) | Gold | 10,000^{‡} |
| Spain (Promusicae) | Gold | 20,000^{‡} |
| United Kingdom (BPI) | Platinum | 300,000^{‡} |
| United States (RIAA) | 4× Platinum | 4,000,000^{‡} |
^{‡} Sales+streaming figures based on certification alone.

== Release history ==
Release dates and formats
| Initial release date | Edition(s) | Format(s) | Ref. |
|---|---|---|---|
| July 7, 2023 | Standard | Digital download; streaming; CD; vinyl LP; cassette | |
| July 13, 2023 | Digital deluxe | Digital download | |
