= Speak Now (song) =

2010 song by Taylor Swift

Promotional single by Taylor Swift

from the album Speak Now
- Released: October 5, 2010
- Genre: Country rock; pop
- Length: 4:00
- Label: Big Machine
- Songwriter: Taylor Swift
- Producers: Taylor Swift; Nathan Chapman

Audio video
- "Speak Now" on YouTube

"Speak Now" is a song by the American singer-songwriter Taylor Swift from her third studio album, Speak Now. Before the album's release, Big Machine Records issued it on the iTunes Store on October 5, 2010. Swift wrote the track inspired by when her friend told her that a guy who the friend had an infatuation with would marry someone else. The lyrics depict Swift interrupting a wedding because she believed the bride was unsuitable for the groom, who runs away with her in the end. Produced by Swift and Nathan Chapman, "Speak Now" is a country rock and pop song with a binary rhythm, beginning with a pair of acoustic guitars and Swift's vocals at her highest range.

Many critics praised the lyrics and found them funny, and some were less appreciative. There were also commendations towards the music and Swift's vocal performance. The song entered the charts of Australia, New Zealand, and South Korea and reached the top ten in those of Canada and the United States. It also received certifications in Australia and the US. Swift sang "Speak Now" live multiple times throughout 2010 and during the concerts of her Speak Now World Tour (2011–2012). She continued to perform the song in certain dates of her later tours.

Following the 2019 dispute regarding the ownership of Swift's master recordings, a re-recording of the song, titled "Speak Now (Taylor's Version)", was released as part of her third re-recorded album Speak Now (Taylor's Version) on July 7, 2023. Produced by Swift and Christopher Rowe, it peaked at number 24 on the Billboard Global 200 chart and reached several countries worldwide, including those in Europe, North America, Oceania, and Southeast Asia. Critics praised the re-recording for retaining the appeal of the original and for Swift's vocals.

== Background and writing ==
After the release of her second studio album Fearless in 2008, Taylor Swift wrote her next one, Speak Now, alone for two years. She described the album as comprising tracks about the things she had wanted to say but was unable to do with the people she had met. Like with Fearless, she produced it with Nathan Chapman. There were as many as 40 songs Swift wrote for the album, and "Speak Now" was among the 14 tracks that made it into the final track listing.

Unlike much of the album's songs that are autobiographical, "Speak Now" is one of the tracks that, as Swift put it, "are an extension of my feelings and hypothetically what I would do." Her inspiration for it originated from a conversation with a friend, learning that a guy whom the friend had an infatuation with since she was a child was marrying someone else. According to Swift, the person whom he was engaged to allegedly was a "horrible, controlling, mean girl", making him depart from his family and friends. The information given made her say to the friend, "Are you going to speak now, rush [sic] the church and say, 'Don't do it,' " and imagine what she would have done in her perspective. Later that night, Swift dreamed that one of her former lovers was marrying another person and wrote "Speak Now" after waking up. She envisioned it as the plan of what would have been done if she was placed in her friend's situation.

== Lyrics and themes ==
"Speak Now" unfolds at a wedding, wherein Swift's character sneaks in and plans to interrupt it in order to gain the groom. Hiding in the curtains uninvited, she does this because she believes the bride is unsuitable for him. The song features themes that recur in Swift's early works, including her juvenile mindset, imagining scenarios, and attempts at preventing her love interests from having relationships with what she deems incompatible partners. Some critics viewed it as a retread or continuation of Swift's "You Belong with Me" (2009), a song about her longing for one of her friends whose girlfriend treats him terribly. For Stereogum's James Rettig, the track is a fusion of a 1990s romantic comedy film and the Panic! at the Disco song "I Write Sins Not Tragedies" (2006).

The lyrics are playful and caustically targets the bride. According to the music journalist Annie Zaleski, the song depicts a sarcastic and deceptive side of Swift's songwriting. Swift admits that while it is unusual for her to ruin someone's wedding ("I am not the kind of girl / Who should be rudely barging in on a white veil occasion"), she ensures that he will not marry the woman. Throughout the track, Swift explains the scene in detail, such as how the bride's "snotty" family is donned in pastel clothing and the fact that the organ plays "a song that sounds like a death march". Aspects and actions of the bride are also mentioned, including her wedding gown described as "pastry"-shaped, how she walks along the aisle "like a pageant queen", and how she shouts at her bridesmaids.

Swift waits for the moment when an interjection is suitable, and she does so when "speak now or forever hold your peace" is stated. In the chorus, she begs the groom to flee the wedding together: "Don't say yes, run away now/I'll meet you when you're out, of the church at the back door". The groom ultimately chooses to run away with Swift, leaving behind the bride at the altar: "And you say, 'Let's run away now. I'll meet you when I'm out of my tux at the back door. Baby, I didn't say a vow. So glad you were around when they said, "Speak Now."'" Jocelyn Vena of MTV News found this plot twist to mirror that of Swift's songs "Love Story" (2008) and "You Belong with Me", while a number of critics thought the wedding interruption resembled that of the film, The Graduate (1967). (Note: Attributed to Chris Willman of New York, the musicologist James E. Perone, Jon Dolan of Rolling Stone, and Leah Greenblatt of Entertainment Weekly)

Some critics found "Speak Now" to be an evolution of Swift's songwriting based on its themes and how she wrote it. For the music writers Damien Somville and Marine Benoit, the "often direct and diary-like" lyrical approach Swift employed allowed for a "natural" progression of her style and helped her develop the album's concept. In The Morning Call, John J. Moser thought the exaggerated and pretentious lyrics were new for her. Vena opined that she stepped up her lyricism from writing "boys on the football team to [...] guys getting married". Jason Lipshutz from Billboard had a similar view, writing: "her declarations of true love have graduated from high school prom to a wedding ceremony." On the contrary, Slant Magazine's Jonathan Keefe said that how the song among other Speak Now tracks is limited to being about men and Swift's relationships with them showed uninterest in writing songs outside those subjects with her third album.

== Music ==
"Speak Now"
Swift sings at the top end of her vocal range on "Speak Now" (sampled), backed by acoustic guitars, backing vocals, drums, an electric guitar, and a glockenspiel and orchestral bells in counterpoint.

"Speak Now" was produced by Swift and Chapman. It is a country rock and pop song, described as "bouncy" and "upbeat" by critics. Maura Johnston of Vulture called it a "chunky rock-and-Nashville hybrid", while Moser regarded the chorus as "jaunty lilt, '50s-rock". Writing for The Hollywood Reporter, Chris Willman commented that the track could be the "bubblegummiest thing" Swift made so far when the album was released.

With a four minute duration, "Speak Now" is set over a binary rhythm with a tempo of 120 beats per minute, where a snare drum is pounded at every eighth note of the second beat of each bar. It begins with a pair of acoustic guitars played in the same rhythmic sequence—one is performed with a pick (panned to the right) while the other with fingers (panned to the center). Backed by orchestration, the song has an arrangement that includes orchestral bells and glockenspiel in counterpoint, Hammond organ strings, and arpeggios from a twelve-string electric guitar. Backing vocals and a guitar solo were also featured. From the start, Swift's singing is at the highest point of her vocal range. Her vocals contain twang and pop intonations which, as said by Benoit and Somville, was uncommon for her to do. A pitch correction software was used for Swift's vocals, such as in the end of a number of phrases. According to GQ's Lucy Ford, "Speak Now" was among the album's tracks where her "saccharine pop vocals" were particularly evident.

Critics deemed certain musical elements to evoke those from other songs and artists. Benoit and Somville said that the track recalls late 1950s doo-wop songs, attributing this to its binary rhythm, backing vocals, harmonic progression, and musical arrangement. Contributing to Our Country, Willman remarked that Swift's "uncharacteristic vocal style" for it was closer to that of the singer Feist than the more conversational one he believed she typically uses. Zaleski wrote that the "lush, layered" chorus reminded her of the band Eisley. Others thought specific melodies of the song were similar to those of "You Belong with Me", namely the former's "twangy, up-and-down hooks" and the latter's "she wears short skirts" melody. Among them was the musicologist James E. Perone, who also found the drum style in the chorus the same as that associated with the Beatles' early works and later used by some 1980s new wave rock bands.

== Release and commercial performance ==
Speak Now was released on October 25, 2010, with the title track as fourth on the tracklist. Beforehand, Swift would preview a song from the album in each of the last three weeks before the week of the album's release, and it would be issued on the iTunes Store the day after; "Speak Now" was planned as the first one for release. Big Machine Records made the song available on the platform on October 5, following the previous day Swift previewed it.

In its first day, "Speak Now" sold more than 85,600 downloads in the United States, and had reached 217,000 by the end of its first week, resulting in a number-two debut on the Digital Songs chart. On the Billboard Hot 100, the track entered at number eight and became Swift's sixth top-ten debut, which was a new record for most top-ten debuts among acts on the chart, surpassing that of Mariah Carey. It later peaked at number 58 on Country Airplay. On November 29, 2011, the country's Recording Industry Association of America awarded the song with a gold certification.

Elsewhere, "Speak Now" reached charts in Canada (peaking at 8), New Zealand (34), and South Korea (89). In Australia, the track debuted and peaked at number 20 on the ARIA Singles Chart on the week of October 20, 2010. It earned a platinum certification from the country's Australian Recording Industry Association in 2024.

== Critical reception ==
Many critics positively wrote about the lyrics, which some believed in retrospect made the song timeless and exemplary of how the album to them was one of Swift's best lyrically. In Hartford Courant, Eric R. Danton said that it impeccably combined snarkiness and "idealistic yearning". Damien and Somville dubbed the lyrics "colorful", and Billboard's Denise Warner remarked that Swift portrayed "the panic of watching someone walk down the aisle to the wrong person" with expertise. The narrative was thought by Melinda Newman from HitFix and Rettig to showcase to them Swift's prowess in storytelling, which NME's Hannah Mylrea wrote was at its most vivacious on what she called a "brilliantly intricate" story. Simon Vozick-Levinson of Entertainment Weekly, who considered the track among Swift's best on release, said that the narrative was a "classic" one from her.

The lyrics were found to be funny by several critics. Perone considered Swift's humor on the song "interesting" and amusing, and Zaleski believed that it was showcased by, to her, Swift's "sassy, devious songwriting side". Rolling Stone's Rob Sheffield described the track as "priceless", recommending it to fans of Swift "in stalker mode". Also from Rolling Stone, Jon Dolan highlighted how she scathingly addresses the bride, concluding that she "knows how to spin hate into cotton candy." Jane Song of Paste remarked that despite the track containing the "snarky spirit" of Swift's song "Better than Revenge" (2010)—which she was not fond of—she supports Swift's character in her wedding interruption.

Some critics were less complimentary. In Chicago Tribune, Alexis Hosticka felt that Swift went overboard with depicting her infatuation with the groom. Allison Stewart from The Washington Post regarded the track as the album's "only real misfire", saying that Swift shaming the bride to win the groom was a "bad", puerile concept that to her makes the listener have pity for the bride. While Keefe thought the song "may work brilliantly on its own merits", he questioned whether Swift would write songs other than men and her relationships with them. Although Moser, Vulture's Nate Jones, and The Ringer's Nora Princiotti were less pleased with the lyrics and narrative, they nonetheless appreciated the exaggerated tone, which Moser underscored when he considered the track one of the album's highlights where "Swift actually changes it up".

The music and Swift's vocal performance were well-received as well. In NPR's Fresh Air talk show, the critic Ken Tucker positively remarked that the music was as "meticulously detailed" as the lyrics that to him make the song enjoyable to casual listeners; he picked Swift's "quick, deftly-sketched" delivery as the example. Moser selected the sound of the chorus as another instance of Swift's subversions on the song. Theon Weber from The Village Voice grouped the track among the album's songs where Swift is "more comfortable" and clever with the soundscapes compared to those on Fearless, describing it as "light and cute" as well as being almost overly sweet. Vozick-Levinson called the composition "expertly catchy" and her delivery "expressive", which he thought compensated for her vocal limitations. Danton and Dolan also found catchiness within the song, and so did Keefe in that it showcased what he deemed Swift's skill of complementing the melodies and lyrical themes tonally. For Benoit and Somville, they wrote that Swift's pop intonations accompany the lyrics "marvelously well".

== Live performances ==
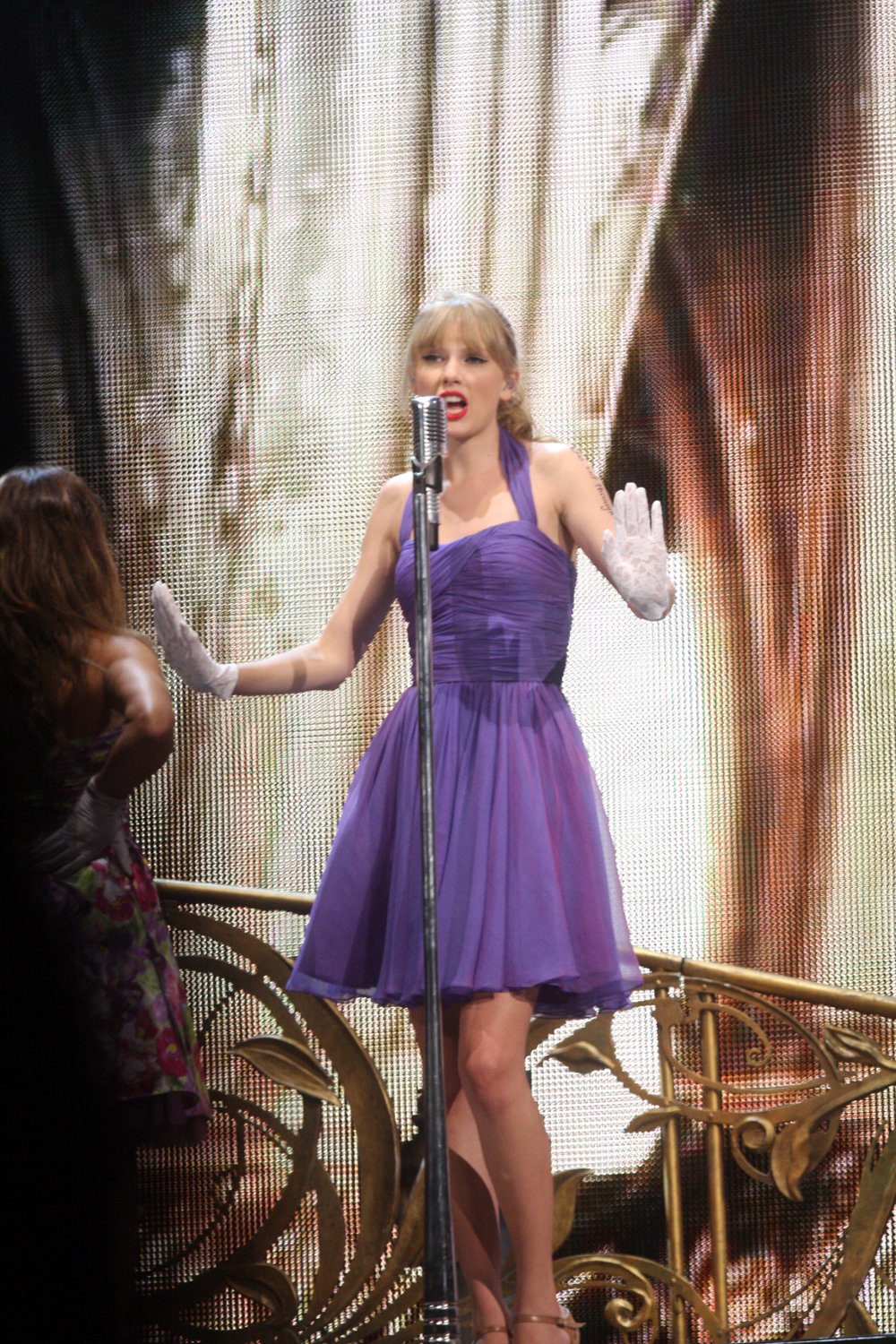
Swift performing "Speak Now" on the Speak Now World Tour

Swift debuted "Speak Now" live during a party celebrating the album's release, which took place at the Metropolitan Pavilion in Manhattan and was webcast by CMT, MTV, and VH1 on October 25, 2010. In the next two days, Swift reprised her performance on the television shows The Today Show and Late Show with David Letterman on October 26, and she sang it as part of her show at the John F. Kennedy International Airport on October 27. On November 14, the song was featured as part of her set list for the 2010 ceremony of BBC Radio 1's Teen Awards. She performed it on NBC's Taylor Swift: Speak Now, which was a Thanksgiving television special that premiered on November 25.

"Speak Now" was part of the set list of the North American leg of Swift's Speak Now World Tour. The song's number is staged as a church in the setting of a wedding ceremony, featuring church pews, a preacher, a bride, a groom, and Swift wearing a halter dress and white gloves. She performs a choreography alongside two dancers to emphasize the song. At the end, Swift flees from the wedding with the groom and goes to a different place in the venue, meeting the audience along the way. In other legs of the tour, "Speak Now" was reported to have been featured in those of Germany, New Zealand, the Philippines, and Singapore. One of the song's performances was also included in the tour's associated live visual album.

Over the years, Swift has performed "Speak Now" on certain dates of later tours. She sang it during a New Orleans show as part of her Reputation Stadium Tour on September 22, 2018. On the Eras Tour, Swift performed the track at a Tampa show on April 13, 2023, and again as a mashup with her song "Hey Stephen" (2008) at a Gelsenkirchen show on July 18, 2024.

== Charts ==
Chart performance
Chart (2010)	Peak position
Australia (ARIA)	20
Canada Hot 100 (Billboard)	8
New Zealand (Recorded Music NZ)	34
South Korea (Circle)	89
US Billboard Hot 100	8
US Country Airplay (Billboard)	58

== Certifications ==
Certifications
Region	Certification	Certified units/sales
Australia (ARIA)	Platinum	70,000^{‡}
United States (RIAA)	Gold	500,000^{*}
^{*} Sales figures based on certification alone.^{‡} Sales+streaming figures based on certification alone.

== "Speak Now (Taylor's Version)" ==
"Speak Now (Taylor's Version)"

Song by Taylor Swift

from the album Speak Now (Taylor's Version)
- Released: July 7, 2023
- Studio: Blackbird (Nashville, Tennessee)
- Length: 4:02
- Label: Republic
- Songwriter: Taylor Swift
- Producers: Taylor Swift; Christopher Rowe

Lyric video
- "Speak Now (Taylor's Version)" on YouTube

After signing a new contract with Republic Records, Swift began re-recording her first six studio albums in November 2020. The decision came after the public 2019 dispute between her and the talent manager Scooter Braun, who acquired Big Machine, including the masters of her albums the label had released. By re-recording her catalog, Swift had full ownership of the new masters, including the copyright licensing of her songs, devaluing the Big Machine-owned masters. With Speak Now, all 14 original tracks were re-recorded for Speak Now (Taylor's Version), which released via Republic on July 7, 2023, as Swift's third re-recorded album.

The song's re-recording, subtitled "Taylor's Version", was produced by Swift and Christopher Rowe and is four minutes and two seconds in length. As with the rest of the album's re-recorded songs, its arrangement is accurate to that of the original recording. According to the album's liner notes, the track was done in multiple studios, including Blackbird Studio at Nashville, where it was recorded by David Payne. The others were Kitty Committee Studio at London (for recording Swift's vocals done by Rowe), MixStar Studios at Virginia Beach, Virginia (mixing done by Serban Ghenea), Prime Recording at Nashville (additional engineering and digital editing done by Derek Garten with Lowell Reynolds for assistance), and Sterling Sound at Edgewater, New Jersey (mastering done by Randy Merrill).

=== Critical reception ===
Critics had positive comments for the re-recorded track, the majority of which praised how the song's content remained engaging with it. The Manila Bulletin opined that the re-recording had the same exuberance as that of the original. Writing for The i Paper, Kate Solomon remarked that the re-recording made her once more admire the track's "soap operatics". Mark Sutherland of Rolling Stone UK said that its "snarky gown-shaming" continued being marvelously genuine with the re-recording, picking it as an example for his claim that the re-recorded album retained the original's qualities that made it so exceptional. In a ranking of the ten best tracks from the album where the re-recording placed eighth, American Songwriter's Alex Hopper believed that it maintained the song's feature and to him Swift's early storytelling skill of depicting sharp imagery.

The other commendations were for Swift's vocals. Ilana Kaplan of The Daily Beast wrote that a newfound "crispness" within her voice made the song further a "massive-sounding anthem". The Daily Telegraph's Poppie Platt remarked that while her older vocals may be initially unsettling, "her grasp on tone and melody has much improved" that the re-recording is still effective when viewed as a re-imagining.

=== Commercial performance ===
"Speak Now (Taylor's Version)" reached the top 40 of the Billboard Global 200 chart (peaking at 24), as well as those of the English-speaking countries Australia (22), New Zealand (26), and Canada (31). In the US, it charted on the Billboard Hot 100 alongside 25 other songs from Swift—entering at number 33—and helped extend her record of having the second-most chart entries out of any act with 212. The re-recording also debuted and peaked at number 14 on Hot Country Songs.

In non-English speaking countries, "Speak Now (Taylor's Version)" reached number five in the Philippines, number 11 in Singapore, and number 94 in Vietnam. It received a gold certification in Brazil from Pro-Música Brasil. The re-recording entered charts that only track streams from a specific country as well, including Malaysia's Top 20 Most Streamed International Singles (peaking at 19), the United Kingdom's Official Audio Streaming Chart (45), and Greece's Top 100 Digital Singles International (73).

=== Personnel ===
Adapted from Speak Now (Taylor's Version) digital album inline notes

- Taylor Swift – lead vocals, background vocals, songwriter, producer
- Christopher Rowe – producer, vocal engineer
- David Payne – recording engineer
- Lowell Reynolds – assistant recording engineer, additional digital editor
- Derek Garten – additional engineer, digital editor, programming
- Serban Ghenea – mixing
- Bryce Bordone – mix engineer
- Randy Merrill – mastering
- Matt Billingslea – drums, percussion, clapping
- Amos Heller – bass guitar, clapping
- Paul Sidoti – electric guitar
- Mike Meadows – acoustic guitar, clapping, organ
- Max Bernstein – electric guitar
- Liz Huett – background vocals

=== Charts ===
Chart performance
Chart (2023)	Peak position
Australia (ARIA)	22
Canada Hot 100 (Billboard)	31
Global 200 (Billboard)	24
Greece International (IFPI)	73
Malaysia International (RIM)	19
New Zealand (Recorded Music NZ)	26
Philippines (Billboard)	5
Singapore (RIAS)	11
UK Streaming (OCC)	45
US Billboard Hot 100	33
US Hot Country Songs (Billboard)	14
Vietnam (Vietnam Hot 100)	94

=== Certification ===
Certifications
Region	Certification	Certified units/sales
Brazil (Pro-Música Brasil)	Gold	20,000^{‡}
^{‡} Sales+streaming figures based on certification alone.
