= Better than Revenge =

2010 song by Taylor Swift

Song by Taylor Swift

from the album Speak Now
- Released: October 25, 2010
- Genre: Pop-punk
- Length: 3:37
- Label: Big Machine
- Songwriter: Taylor Swift
- Producers: Taylor Swift; Nathan Chapman

Audio video
- "Better than Revenge" on YouTube

"Better than Revenge" is a song written and recorded by the American singer-songwriter Taylor Swift for her third studio album, Speak Now (2010). Swift and Nathan Chapman produced the track, which is an electric guitar-driven pop-punk song. In the lyrics, Swift's character addresses a romantic rival that stole her boyfriend, lambasting the sexual habits, tastes, and life choices of the other girl. "Better than Revenge" charted in Canada and the United States in 2010, and it was included in the set list of Swift's Speak Now World Tour (2011–2012).

When the track was first released, some music critics found it entertaining, but feminist writers and journalists took issue with its lyrics as slut-shaming and misogynistic. Swift has since identified as a feminist, although critical commentary on her public image persisted. In the 2023 re-recorded version of the song titled "Better than Revenge (Taylor's Version)", which Swift released after a 2019 dispute regarding the ownership of her albums, she altered a lyric in the chorus—a move that received a mixed reaction. "Better than Revenge (Taylor's Version)" peaked at number 25 on the Billboard Global 200, and Swift performed the altered version at a November 2023 concert in Buenos Aires as part of the Eras Tour.

== Background and release ==
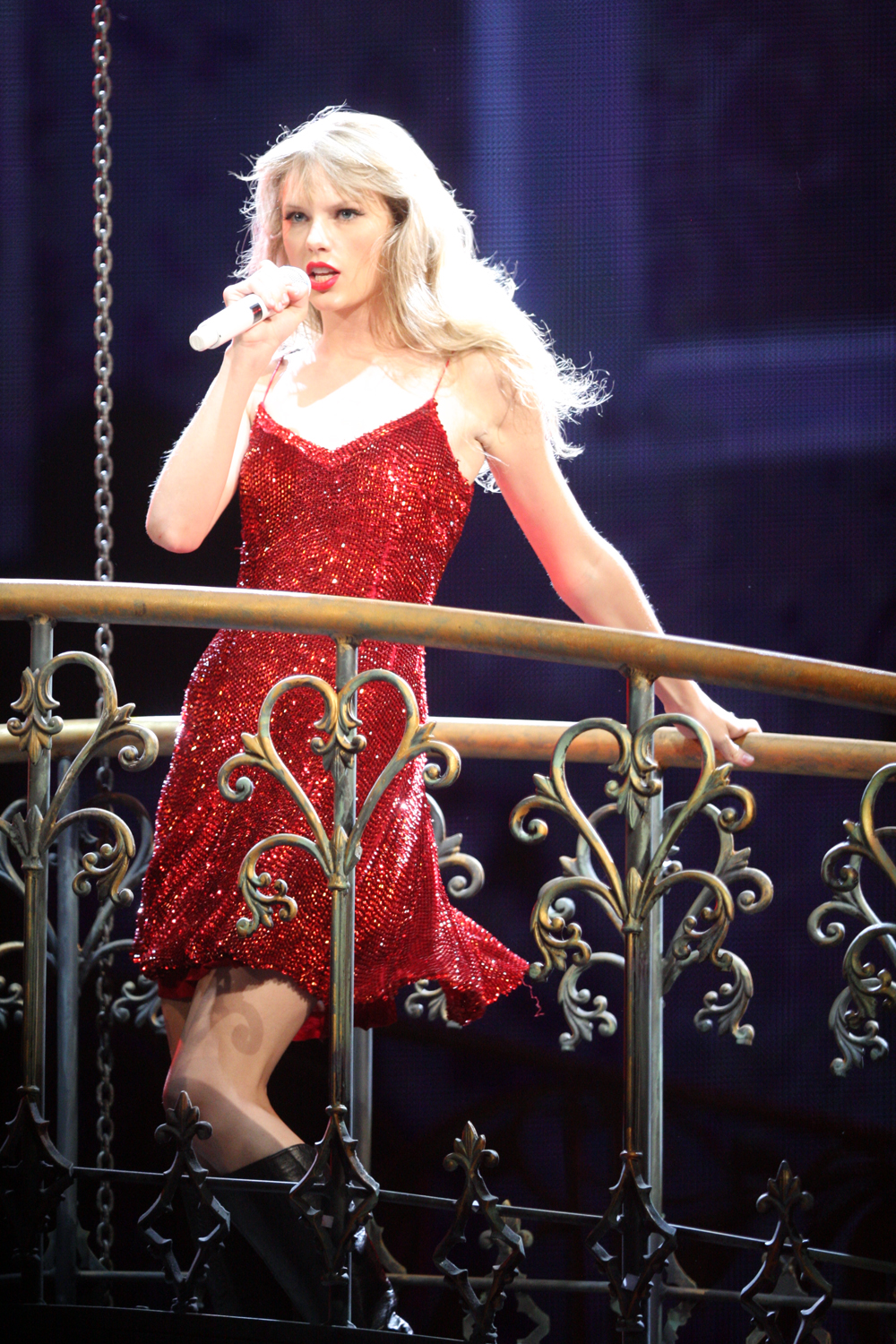
Swift singing "Better than Revenge" on the Speak Now World Tour in 2012

Taylor Swift released her third studio album, Speak Now, on October 25, 2010. She wrote all 14 album tracks by herself and conceived Speak Now as a loose concept album about the confessions she wanted but never had the chance to make to people she had met. The album's lyrics depart from the high school perspectives of her previous records, certain songs containing vengeful messages towards those who had wronged her. One of such songs, "Better than Revenge", was directed at a romantic rival. Swift did not reveal the subject of the song. "Better than Revenge" is track number 10 on Speak Now, produced by Swift and Nathan Chapman.

Swift included the song on the set list of her Speak Now World Tour (2011–2012). During the shows, she sang the song on top of a bridge, dressed in a red sequined mini-dress and boots, and play-fought with one of her dancers. While on the Eras Tour in Buenos Aires, on November 12, 2023, Swift surprised observers by performing the song.

== Music and lyrics ==
"Better than Revenge" is an electric guitar-driven pop punk song. According to Ann Powers of the Los Angeles Times, Swift's vocals on the song expanded considerably. The lyrics are about Swift's plea for vengeance against a romantic rival. Compared to her previous songs about romantic fantasy, "Better than Revenge" features a more real-life perspective on love. In the refrain, Swift describes the rival as an "actress" who is "known for the things that she does on the mattress". Maura Johnston writing for Vulture cited this part as one of a few instances of Speak Now where Swift writes about sexual experiences, a new theme for her at the time.

The first verse of "Better than Revenge" includes rhyming stranded prepositions in the lines "I never saw it coming, wouldn't have suspected it / I underestimated just who I was dealing with / She had to know the pain was beating on me like a drum / She underestimated just who she was stealing from".

== Critical reception ==
"Better Than Revenge" received mixed reviews from critics, with criticism directed at its lyrics. In an American Songwriter review of Speak Now, Rick Moore contended that "Better than Revenge" is the one song that "shows Swift isn't the naïve young role model that so many parents perceive her to be", citing the "on the mattress" lyrics. Allison Stewart of The Washington Post considered the said lyrics immature, but acknowledged that the song, among others such as "Dear John" or "Innocent", moves Swift's image from the "unearthly sweetness" of her previous songs. In BBC Music, Matthew Horton deemed it one of Speak Now's weaker songs.

Slant Magazine writer Jonathan Keefe was critical of "Better than Revenge", deeming the track overall shallow and shortsighted because it indulged in self-righteousness: "Her narrators often seem to lack insight because Swift writes with the point of view that hers is the only story to be told." John J. Moser of The Morning Call remarked that the immature "Better than Revenge", among other songs, backfired Swift's self-proclaimed maturity on Speak Now: "Instead of conveying mature emotions, the songs convey a teen-age girl's concepts of mature emotions ... If Swift is so mature, why is she so bent on revenge, anyway?"

In a more positive vein, Mikael Wood from Spin deemed "Better than Revenge" entertaining. Leah Greenbalt of Entertainment Weekly considered the "surprisingly sharp-toothed" song a step forward from Swift's previous "twitterpated heart of teendom", and Steve Hyden of The A.V. Club considered the track, among others about vengeance, one of Speak Now's strongest: "Swift's niftiest trick is being at her most likeable when she’s indulging in such overt nastiness." Rolling Stone featured the song on their 2015 list of "Country's 20 Best Revenge Songs": "Taylor Swift has made a multi-million dollar career out of getting lyrical revenge, with ["Better than Revenge"] perhaps packing the strongest punch."

== Commentary and aftermath ==
Contemporary media reacted negatively to "Better than Revenge", complaining its narrative was slut-shaming. As observed by Nate Jones for Vulture, the song solidified Swift's image as anti-feminist; some media had previously accused Swift of being hostile to feminism through lyrics of certain songs such as "Fifteen", which critics deemed sex-negative, and "You Belong with Me", which is about her competing with another girl for a boy's love. Some feminist writers alleged that Swift was capitalizing on female-female rivalries. In 2014, Swift told The Guardian that she identified as a feminist and spoke about the song: "I was 18 when I wrote that. That's the age you are when you think someone can actually take your boyfriend. Then you grow up and realize no one can take someone from you if they don't want to leave."

Even after Swift claimed to be a feminist, critics continued to take issue with her "calculated" image, deeming her feminist ideology self-interested and performative. As Swift's success grew with her subsequent pop albums, the media focused on the lyrics of "Better than Revenge" to question Swift's feminist identity. In a commentary for New Statesman in 2017, Annie Leszkiewicz considered "Better than Revenge" a misstep for Swift's artistry, on the grounds that it indulged in celebrity and tarnished her wholesome public image that she had curated. Journalists indicated that "Better than Revenge" was the precedent to many of Swift's subsequent songs about celebrity and vengeance, such as "Bad Blood" (2015) and "Look What You Made Me Do" (2017), as her personal life became sensationalized in the press. As a result, Swift changed a lyric on the re-recorded version of the song in 2023.

== Commercial performance ==
After Speak Now was released, "Better than Revenge" entered and peaked at number 73 on the Canadian Hot 100. In the United States, the song peaked at number 56 on the Billboard Hot 100 and number six on the Country Digital Song Sales chart. In 2014, the Recording Industry Association of America (RIAA) certified the track gold for surpassing 500,000 units based on sales and streaming.

== Charts ==
Chart performance
| Chart (2010) | Peak position |
|---|---|
| Canada Hot 100 (Billboard) | 73 |
| US Billboard Hot 100 | 56 |
| US Country Digital Song Sales (Billboard) | 6 |

== Certifications ==
Certifications
| Region | Certification | Certified units/sales |
|---|---|---|
| Australia (ARIA) | Platinum | 70,000^{‡} |
| United Kingdom (BPI) | Silver | 200,000^{‡} |
| New Zealand (RMNZ) | Gold | 15,000^{‡} |
| United States (RIAA) | Gold | 500,000^{‡} |
^{‡} Sales+streaming figures based on certification alone.

== "Better than Revenge (Taylor's Version)" ==
"Better than Revenge (Taylor's Version)"

Song by Taylor Swift

from the album Speak Now (Taylor's Version)
- Released: July 7, 2023
- Studio: Blackbird (Nashville); Kitty Committee (London); Prime Recording (Nashville)
- Length: 3:40
- Label: Republic
- Songwriter: Taylor Swift
- Producers: Taylor Swift; Christopher Rowe

Lyric video
- "Better than Revenge (Taylor's Version)" on YouTube

After signing a new contract with Republic Records, Swift began re-recording her first six studio albums in November 2020. The decision came after a 2019 dispute between Swift and the talent manager Scooter Braun, who acquired Big Machine Records, including the masters of Swift's albums the label had released. By re-recording her catalog, Swift had full ownership of the new masters, including the copyright licensing of her songs, devaluing the Big Machine-owned masters. The re-recorded version of "Better than Revenge" titled "Better than Revenge (Taylor's Version)", was released on July 7, 2023, via Republic Records as part of Speak Now (Taylor's Version), Swift's third re-recorded album.

Swift was accused of slut-shaming in the original version of the song with the lyric "she's better known for the things that she does on the mattress". On "Better than Revenge (Taylor's Version)", the lyric was ultimately replaced, with Swift singing "he was a moth to the flame, she was holding the matches" instead. Many critics took issue with the lyrical change and deemed it unnecessary because it downplayed the original's confrontational attitude from a teenage perspective, but some others appreciated it because they thought it showcased Swift's maturity as an artist and a woman.

=== Personnel ===
Adapted from Speak Now (Taylor's Version) digital album inline notes

- Taylor Swift – vocals, background vocals, songwriter, producer
- Christopher Rowe – producer, vocal engineer
- David Payne – recording engineer
- Lowell Reynolds – assistant recording engineer, editor
- Derek Garten – engineer, editor, programming
- Serban Ghenea – mixing
- Bryce Bordone – mix engineer
- Randy Merrill – mastering
- Matt Billingslea – drums, percussion
- Amos Heller – bass guitar
- Paul Sidoti – electric guitar
- Mike Meadows – electric guitar, acoustic guitar
- Max Bernstein – electric guitar
- Brian Pruitt – drum programming

=== Charts ===
Chart performance for Taylor's version
| Chart (2023) | Peak position |
|---|---|
| Australia (ARIA) | 14 |
| Canada Hot 100 (Billboard) | 29 |
| Global 200 (Billboard) | 25 |
| Greece (IFPI) | 42 |
| Ireland (Billboard) | 18 |
| New Zealand (Recorded Music NZ) | 22 |
| Philippines (Billboard) | 12 |
| Singapore (RIAS) | 12 |
| UK Streaming (OCC) | 32 |
| US Billboard Hot 100 | 28 |
| US Hot Country Songs (Billboard) | 10 |

=== Certification ===
Certification for Taylor's version
| Region | Certification | Certified units/sales |
|---|---|---|
| Australia (ARIA) | Gold | 35,000^{‡} |
| Brazil (Pro-Música Brasil) | Platinum | 40,000^{‡} |
^{‡} Sales+streaming figures based on certification alone.
