= Amos Heller =

Amos Helker may refer to:

- Amos Arthur Heller (1867–1944), American botanist
- Amos Heller (musician), American bassist
