= Electric Touch =

Electric Touch can refer to:

- Electric Touch (band), a rock band from Texas
- Electric Touch (album), a 2010 album by Russian singer Sergey Lazarev
- "Electric Touch" (song), a 2023 song by Taylor Swift featuring Fall Out Boy from Speak Now (Taylor's Version)
