= Electric Touch (song) =

2023 song by Taylor Swift featuring Fall Out Boy

Song by Taylor Swift featuring Fall Out Boy

from the album Speak Now (Taylor's Version)
- Released: July 7, 2023
- Studio: Long Pond (New York); The Clubhouse (Rhinebeck, New York)
- Genre: Pop-punk; pop rock
- Length: 4:26
- Label: Republic
- Songwriter: Taylor Swift
- Producers: Taylor Swift; Aaron Dessner

Lyric video
- "Electric Touch" on YouTube

"Electric Touch" (Note: Officially titled "Electric Touch (Taylor's Version) (From the Vault)") is a song by the American singer-songwriter Taylor Swift featuring the American band Fall Out Boy. Swift wrote the song and intended it for her 2010 studio album, Speak Now, but left it out of the track-list. She produced it with Aaron Dessner for her 2023 re-recorded album, Speak Now (Taylor's Version).

"Electric Touch" is a pop-punk and pop rock song driven by dynamic drums, electric guitar riffs, and vocals from Swift and Fall Out Boy's lead singer Patrick Stump. The lyrics are about the anxieties, excitement, and self-doubt from a newfound love. Most critics gave positive reviews to "Electric Touch", praising the production and the vocal chemistry between Swift and Stump, while others perceived it negatively for what they deemed generic lyricism. The song peaked at number 37 on the Billboard Global 200 and entered charts in Australia, Canada, New Zealand, the Philippines, and the United States.

== Background ==
After signing a new contract with Republic Records, Swift began re-recording her first six studio albums in November 2020. The decision followed a public 2019 dispute between Swift and the talent manager Scooter Braun, who acquired Big Machine Records, including the masters of Swift's albums which the label had released. By re-recording the albums, Swift had full ownership of the new masters, which enabled her to control the licensing of her songs for commercial use and therefore substituted the Big Machine–owned masters. In 2021, Swift released two re-recorded albums of her earlier releases: Fearless (Taylor's Version) and Red (Taylor's Version); each album also featured several unreleased "From the Vault" tracks that she had written but left out of the original albums' track listings.

On May 5, 2023, at the first Nashville date of her sixth concert tour, the Eras Tour, Swift announced Speak Now (Taylor's Version) as her third re-recorded album; it is the re-recording of her third studio album, Speak Now (2010). She shared on social media that the original album was "a tale of growing up, flailing, flying and crashing [...] and living to speak about it" that covered "brutal honesty, unfiltered diaristic confessions and wild wistfulness". On June 5, 2023, Swift announced the track-list of Speak Now (Taylor's Version), which consists six "From the Vault" songs were intended for but left out of Speak Now's 2010 track listing. One of them is "Electric Touch", which features the American rock band Fall Out Boy, one of the songwriting influences for Swift when she was conceiving the 2010 album.

== Music and lyrics ==
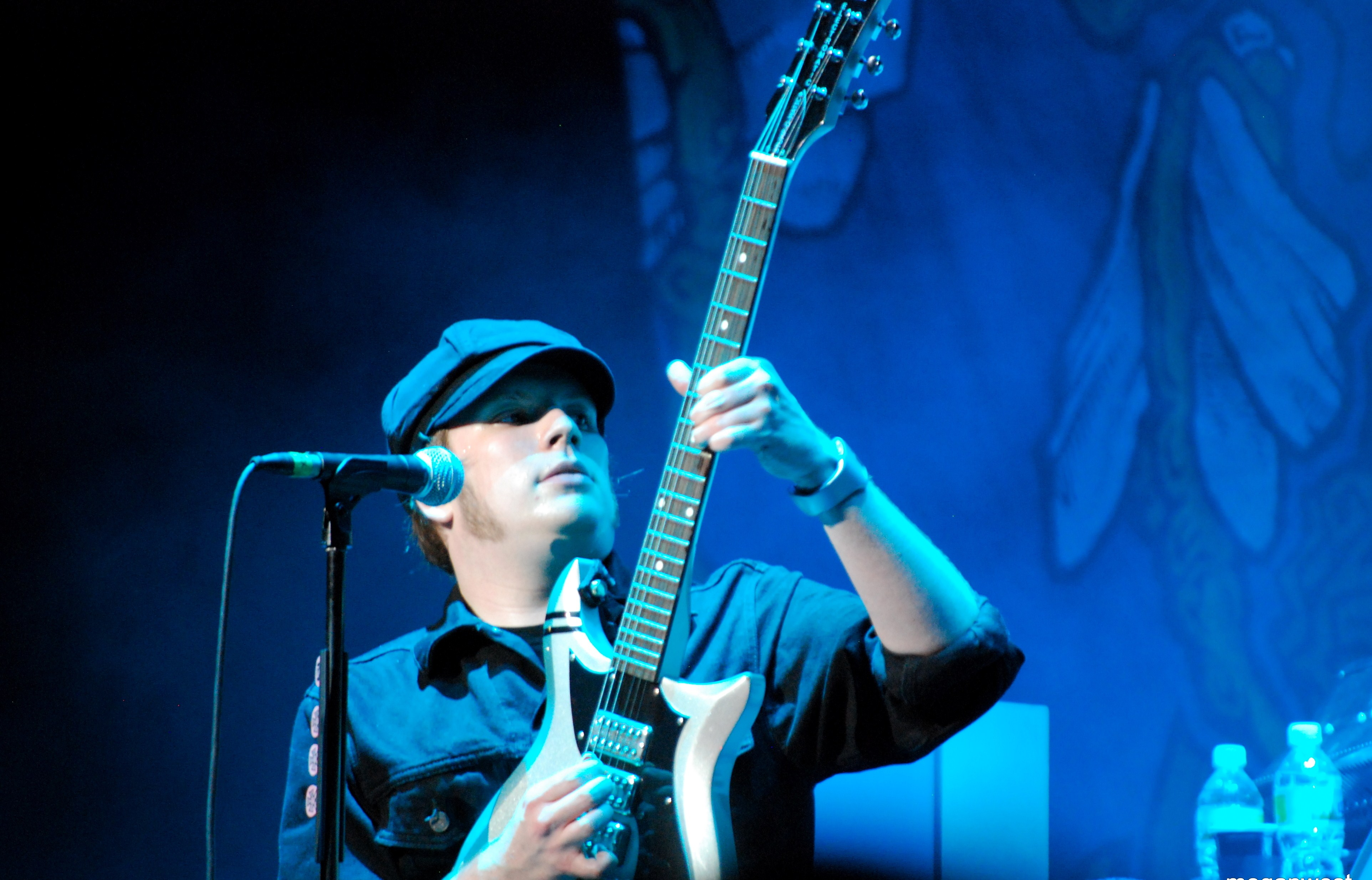
Swift duets with Fall Out Boy's frontman Patrick Stump (pictured) in "Electric Touch".

Swift wrote "Electric Touch" and produced the track with Aaron Dessner, who also engineered it and played guitars, synths, and percussions. Fall Out Boy's frontman Patrick Stump contributed guest vocals, played electric guitar, and provided additional engineering. Other musicians on the track include Benjamin Lanz (synth), James McAlister (synth), Joe Russo (drums), Josh Kaufman (acoustic guitar, electric guitar, piano, organ), and Thomas Bartlett (keyboards, piano, synth).

At 4 minutes and 26 seconds, "Electric Touch" is a pop-punk and pop rock song. The production features electric guitar riffs and crescendoing drums. Critics described the sound as "anthemic", "cinematic", and "soaring". Mikael Wood of the Los Angeles Times described the guitar as "chugging emo". Chris Willman from Variety commented that the sound was in line with Speak Now's "organic pop-rock band sound she favored at the time". In the song, Swift duets with Stump. The lyrics explore the conflicting feelings such as anxieties, pessimism, excitement, hope, and self-doubt over a newfound romance; the chorus demonstrates this, "All I know is this could either break my heart or bring it back to life/ Got a feeling your electric touch could fill this ghost town up with life." Jason Lipshutz from Billboard summarized the theme as "cautious optimism".

== Release ==
Speak Now (Taylor's Version) was released on July 7, 2023, by Republic Records; "Electric Touch" is the 17th song on the album. The song peaked at number 35 on the US Billboard Hot 100 and number 16 on Hot Country Songs, where it became Fall Out Boy's first entry. Elsewhere, it charted in the Philippines (22), New Zealand (35), Australia (38), Canada (46), and it peaked at number 37 on the Billboard Global 200.

== Critical reception ==
Rachel R. Carroll of PopMatters commended Swift's ability to "turn a small, fleeting moment into a cinematic showstopper". Mark Sutherland from Rolling Stone UK wrote that Fall Out Boy raises the song to "soaring pop-punk status". Bobby Olivier of Spin compared "Electric Touch" to other duet "Castles Crumbling" with Hayley Williams of Paramore, and opined that the former is more upbeat and called it a "fun and hooky, four-on-the-floor guitar jam — exactly the sort of pop-rock banger missed amid the digital thumps of Midnights". Laura Shapes of The Guardian described "Electric Touch" as a "rueful stadium chugger", and considered it a "good bit of revisionist history, rightly honouring Speak Now as emo canon".

In Uproxx, Danielle Chelosky lauded Swift and Stump for their musical chemistry and "impressive, mesmerizing" vocals. Rolling Stone journalist Maura Johnston described the song as a "shimmering four minute pop gem", and wrote that Swift and Stump work "pleasantly" together. In a less positive review, Willman found the song to be the least interesting "From the Vault" track compositionally, and said that "it lacks any of the truly great, peculiar lines that mark a Swift song as unmistakably hers". Kate Solomon from the i considered it "extremely mediocre".

== Credits and personnel ==
Credits are adapted from the album's liner notes.

Studios

- Engineered at Long Pond Studio (New York) and The Clubhouse (Rhinebeck, New York)
- Additionally recorded at Long Pond (New York), Nervous Breakdance (Los Angeles), and The Dwelling (New York City)
- Taylor Swift's vocals recorded at Kitty Committee Studio (London)
- Patrick Stump's vocals recorded at Nervous Breakdance (Los Angeles)
- Mixed at Long Pond Studio (New York)

Personnel

- Taylor Swift – vocals, songwriting, production
- Patrick Stump – vocals, electric guitar, additional engineering
- Aaron Dessner – production, engineering, acoustic guitar, bass guitar, electric guitar, synthesizer, percussion
- Benjamin Lanz – synthesizer, additional engineering
- James McAlister – synthesizer, additional engineering
- Joe Russo – drums, percussion
- Josh Kaufman – acoustic guitar, electric guitar, piano, organ
- Thomas Bartlett – keyboards, piano, synthesizer
- Christopher Rowe – vocal engineering
- Bella Blasko – additional engineering
- Jonathan Low – mixing, engineering
- Randy Merrill – mastering

== Charts ==
Chart performance
Chart (2023)	Peak position
Australia (ARIA)	38
Canada Hot 100 (Billboard)	46
Global 200 (Billboard)	37
New Zealand (Recorded Music NZ)	35
Philippines (Billboard)	22
UK Singles Downloads (OCC)	82
UK Singles Sales (OCC)	84
UK Streaming (OCC)	58
US Billboard Hot 100	35
US Hot Country Songs (Billboard)	16
