= Enchanted (Taylor Swift song) =

2010 song by Taylor Swift

Song by Taylor Swift

from the album Speak Now
- Released: October 25, 2010
- Genre: Country rock; Pop rock; Country pop
- Length: 5:52
- Label: Big Machine
- Songwriter: Taylor Swift
- Producers: Taylor Swift; Nathan Chapman

Audio video
- "Enchanted" on YouTube

"Enchanted" is a song written and recorded by the American singer-songwriter Taylor Swift for her third studio album, Speak Now (2010). Produced by Swift and Nathan Chapman, the song is a power ballad combining pop, rock, and country. The production incorporates gentle acoustic guitars and crescendos after each refrain, leading to dynamic electric guitars, a steady drum beat, and a vocal harmony-layered coda. In the lyrics, a narrator is infatuated with someone after meeting them for the first time, and she worries about whether the initial feeling will be reciprocated.

"Enchanted" received widespread acclaim from music critics, who praised the song’s soaring production and captivating lyrics. The track initially charted in Canada and the United States in 2010, and it additionally charted in various Asia-Pacific territories after going viral on the video-sharing app TikTok in October–November 2021. The song received certifications in Australia, Brazil, New Zealand, Spain, the United Kingdom, and the United States. Swift included "Enchanted" on the set lists of the Speak Now World Tour (2011–2012), the 1989 World Tour (2015), and the Eras Tour (2023–2024).

After a 2019 dispute over the ownership of Swift's back catalog, she re-recorded the song as "Enchanted (Taylor's Version)" and released it as part of her third re-recorded album, Speak Now (Taylor's Version) (2023). Produced by Swift and Christopher Rowe, the re-recorded song peaked within the top 10 on charts in Australia, Ireland, the Philippines, and Singapore.

== Background and release ==
Taylor Swift released her third studio album, Speak Now, on October 25, 2010. She wrote all 14 album tracks on the standard edition by herself. Swift wrote "Enchanted" about a man whom she was infatuated with after meeting him in person in New York City, and how she hoped to continue the relationship. She deliberately used the word "wonderstruck" in the lyrics because the subject used it in one of his emails to Swift after they met. In the album booklet, Swift includes the hidden message for the song as "A-D-A-M". "Enchanted" was originally the title track for Speak Now, but Swift changed the album title after consulting with Big Machine Records president Scott Borchetta, who deemed Enchanted unfit for the album's grown-up perspectives.

Upon the album's release, the media speculated that the subject of the song was the singer-songwriter Adam Young, the founder of the music project Owl City. Young responded on Owl City's website on February 13, 2011, that he too was infatuated by Swift after they met for the first time. He uploaded his cover of "Enchanted", in which he changed some of the lyrics to directly address Swift. He sings, "I was never in love with someone else / I never had somebody waiting on me / 'Cause you were all of my dreams come true / And I just wish you knew / Taylor I was so in love with you;" responding to the original's lyrics, "Please don't be in love with someone else / Please don't have somebody waiting on you." Despite the media's speculation, Swift never confirmed or denied that Young was the song's subject, and she never responded to Young's cover.

In October 2011, Swift partnered with Elizabeth Arden, Inc. to release her fragrance brand "Wonderstruck", whose name references the lyrics of "Enchanted". After the success of "Wonderstruck", she released a second fragrance brand called "Wonderstruck Enchanted" in July 2012; both perfumes stem from the fairy tale-inspired theme of "Enchanted" about being enamored by someone after meeting for the first time.

== Music and lyrics ==
"Enchanted"
Swift called the song's bridge her favorite part because it represents her stream of consciousness. A harmony-layered coda appears towards the end.

Musically, "Enchanted" is a power ballad. The song begins with gentle acoustic guitar, which crescendos after each lyric "I was enchanted to meet you". Towards the song's conclusion is a harmony-layered coda featuring multitracked Swift's vocals over synthesizers. BBC Music critic Matthew Horton described it as a pop song. According to Rob Sheffield of Rolling Stone, "Enchanted" includes rock influences. The Daily Telegraph described it as an old-school country song, but Brittany McKenna from Billboard considered the track "outside of the boundaries of country music". Cathalena E. Burch from the Arizona Daily Star deemed it an "arena-rock-worthy ballad".

"Enchanted" describes the aftermath of an encounter with a special person without knowing whether the infatuation would be reciprocated. The lyrics feature a fairy tale undertone to describe romance. The song opens with a scene where Swift first encounters her love interest, "Your eyes whispered 'have we met?'/ Across the room your silhouette starts to make its way to me," over repeated guitar chords. As the song progresses, she wonders about the possibility of a new romance over electric guitar riffs and a steady drum beat. Swift said the bridge was her favorite part because it represents her stream of consciousness when she was writing the song: "Please don't be in love with someone else / Please don't have somebody waiting on you." She said, "it feels good to write exactly what your thoughts were in a certain moment."

== Live performances ==
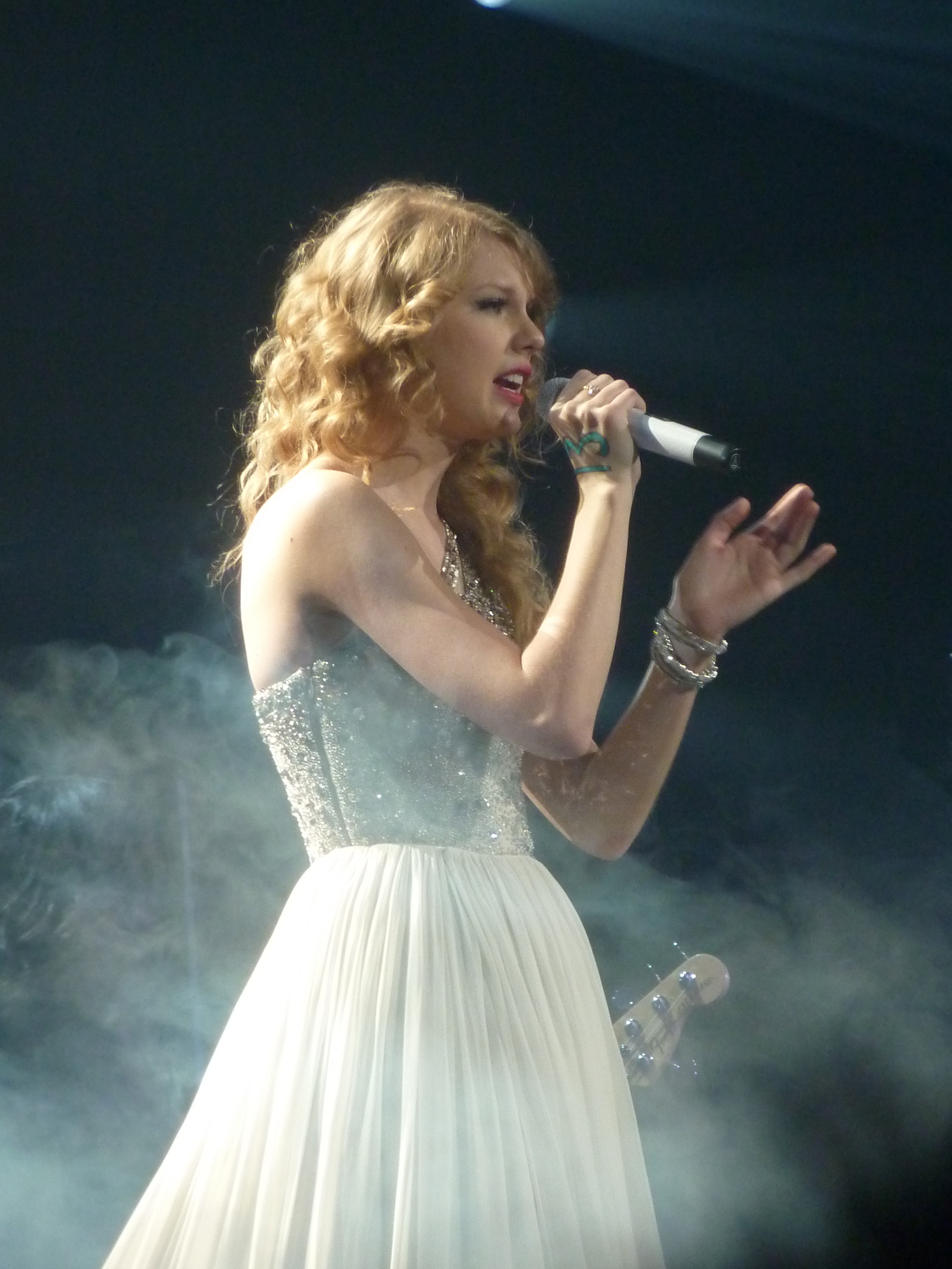
Swift singing "Enchanted" on her Speak Now World Tour (pictured in Paris in 2011)

Swift's first live performance of "Enchanted" was for an NBC Speak Now Thanksgiving Special, which broadcast on November 25, 2010. The TV special showcased the making of the album along with live performances on a rooftop in New York City. Swift included "Enchanted" on the set list for her Speak Now World Tour (2011–2012). During the concerts, she performed in a ball gown atop a winding staircase, with ballerinas dancing in the backdrop. Swift performed "Enchanted" at select shows of the Red Tour (2013–2014), at gigs in Denver and Portland.

For her shows on the 1989 World Tour, Swift included a stripped-down mashup of "Enchanted" and "Wildest Dreams", performed on a grand piano. She performed "Enchanted" as a surprise song at the Reputation Stadium Tour show at MetLife Stadium on July 22, 2018. It was the only song from Speak Now performed on the Eras Tour (2023–2024) until the addition of "Long Live" on July 7, 2023. During the performance, she wore a voluminous ballgown and was surrounded by dancers in sparkling, flowing dresses.

== Critical reception ==
"Enchanted" received widespread acclaim by critics for its lyricism and soaring production. In a Rolling Stone review of Speak Now, Sheffield commented that Swift's "voice is unaffected enough to mask how masterful she has become as a singer". He included "Enchanted" among the best songs released by Swift, highlighting the harmony-layered coda as a "coup de grace". Alex Macpherson from The Guardian praised the song for showcasing "Swift's instinct for capturing emotion with astonishing exactitude – right down to the dread sneaking in at the song's close". Matthew Horton of BBC Music praised its radio-friendly production, and Slant Magazine critic Jonathan Keefe lauded the production for exhibiting Swift's songwriting craftsmanship, selecting "Enchanted" as one of the album's highlights.

Erin Strecker of Billboard ranked it as the fourth most underrated Taylor Swift song in a 2014 list. The Daily Telegraph included it in their 2014 list of Swift's top ten songs. In another ranking of Swift's discography, Jane Song from Paste placed "Enchanted" among the top ten best songs released by Swift, lauding the track for Swift's songwriting resulting in a captivating narrative. Hannah Mylrea of NME specifically highlighted the track's "huge swooning instrumentals and [...] heartfelt chorus". Nate Jones from Vulture praised the production but thought that the song's six minute duration was unnecessary.

== Commercial performance ==
After Speak Now was released, on November 13, 2010, "Enchanted" entered the US Billboard Hot 100 at number 75, the Digital Song Sales chart at number 44, and the Country Digital Song Sales chart at number 11. It entered at number 95 on the Canadian Hot 100 chart. In 2014, the Recording Industry Association of America (RIAA) certified "Enchanted" gold for surpassing 500,000 track-equivalent units, based on sales and on-demand streaming.

Between October and November 2021, "Enchanted" experienced a popularity resurgence after it went viral on the video sharing app TikTok. In the United States, for the week of October 27, 2021, it amassed over one million streams; the following week, it gained over three million streams. It reached the top ten on Billboard's Country Streaming Songs and entered two other Billboard's component charts: Digital Song Sales and Streaming Songs. The song's unexpected popularity was part of "SwiftTok", a hashtag for the collection of TikTok videos using Swift's songs.

"Enchanted" peaked at number 55 on the Billboard Global 200. It reached a new peak on the Canadian Hot 100, at number 47. The song charted on the singles charts of Australia (number 43) and Singapore (number 14). "Enchanted" was certified double platinum in Australia, and platinum in New Zealand and the United Kingdom.

== Charts ==
2010 chart performance
Chart (2010)	Peak position
Canada (Canadian Hot 100)	95
US Billboard Hot 100	75
US Country Digital Song Sales (Billboard)	11

2021–2024 chart performance
Chart (2021–2024)	Peak position
Australia (ARIA)	27
Canada Hot 100 (Billboard)	47
Global 200 (Billboard)	55
Malaysia (RIM)	11
Panama (PRODUCE)	10
Philippines (Billboard)	13
Portugal (AFP)	51
Singapore (RIAS)	4
UK Audio Streaming (Official Charts)	74
US Hot 100 Recurrents (Billboard)	4
US Digital Song Sales (Billboard)	37
US Streaming Songs (Billboard)	32
US Country Streaming Songs (Billboard)	9
Vietnam (Vietnam Hot 100)	90

== Certifications ==
Certifications
Region	Certification	Certified units/sales
Australia (ARIA)	2× Platinum	140,000^{‡}
Brazil (Pro-Música Brasil)	Gold	30,000^{‡}
New Zealand (RMNZ)	Platinum	30,000^{‡}
Spain (Promusicae)	Gold	30,000^{‡}
United Kingdom (BPI)	Platinum	600,000^{‡}
United States (RIAA)	Gold	500,000^{‡}
^{‡} Sales+streaming figures based on certification alone.

== "Enchanted (Taylor's Version)" ==
"Enchanted (Taylor's Version)"

Song by Taylor Swift

from the album Speak Now (Taylor's Version)
- Released: July 7, 2023
- Studio: Blackbird Studio (Nashville, TN); Kitty Committee Studio (London, England); Prime Recording (Nashville, TN); The EBC (London, England)
- Length: 5:53
- Label: Republic
- Songwriter: Taylor Swift
- Producers: Taylor Swift; Christopher Rowe

Lyric video
- "Enchanted (Taylor's Version)" on YouTube

After signing a new contract with Republic Records, Swift began re-recording her first six studio albums in November 2020. The decision came after a public 2019 dispute between Swift and the talent manager Scooter Braun, who acquired Big Machine Records, including the masters of Swift's albums the label had released. By re-recording her catalog, Swift had full ownership of the new masters, including the copyright licensing of her songs, devaluing the Big Machine-owned masters. A re-recorded version of "Enchanted", titled "Enchanted (Taylor's Version)", was released on July 7, 2023, via Republic Records, as part of Speak Now (Taylor's Version), Swift's third re-recorded album.

=== Personnel ===
Adapted from Speak Now (Taylor's Version) digital album inline notes

Production

- Taylor Swift – producer
- Christopher Rowe – producer, vocal engineer
- David Payne – recording engineer
- Lowell Reynolds – assistant recording engineer, editor
- Derek Garten – engineer, editor, programming
- Serban Ghenea – mixing
- Bryce Bordone – mix engineer
- Randy Merrill – mastering

Musicians

- Taylor Swift – vocals, background vocals, songwriter
- Matt Billingslea – drums, percussion
- Amos Heller – bass guitar
- Paul Sidoti – electric guitar
- Mike Meadows – acoustic guitar, keyboards
- Max Bernstein – lap steel guitar
- Caitlin Evanson – background vocals
- Christopher Rowe – background vocals
- Jeremy Murphy – string recording
- London Contemporary Orchestra – strings
  - Galya Bisengalieva, Zahra Benyounes, Natalie Kloudak, Charlotte Reid, Anna Ovsyanikova, Antonia Kesel, Eloisa-Fleur Thom, Anna de Bruin, Charis Jenson, Guy Button, Nicole Crespo O'Donoghue, Nicole Stokes – violin
  - Zoe Matthews, Clifton Harrison, Matthew Kettle, Stephanie Edmundson – viola
  - Oliver Coates, Jonny Byers, Max Ruisi – cello
  - Dave Brown – double bass

=== Charts ===
==== Weekly charts ====
Chart performance for Taylor's version
Chart (2023–2024)	Peak position
Australia (ARIA)	7
Canada Hot 100 (Billboard)	18
Global 200 (Billboard)	11
Greece International (IFPI)	43
Ireland (IRMA)	8
Malaysia (Billboard)	17
Malaysia International (RIM)	3
New Zealand (Recorded Music NZ)	15
Philippines (Billboard)	4
Singapore (RIAS)	2
Sweden Heatseeker (Sverigetopplistan)	15
UK Singles (Official Charts)	15
US Billboard Hot 100	19
US Hot Country Songs (Billboard)	7
Vietnam (Vietnam Hot 100)	39

==== Year-end charts ====
Year-end chart performance for Taylor's version
Chart (2023)	Position
US Hot Country Songs (Billboard)	69

=== Certifications ===
Certifications for Taylor's version
Region	Certification	Certified units/sales
Australia (ARIA)	Platinum	70,000^{‡}
Brazil (Pro-Música Brasil)	Platinum	40,000^{‡}
New Zealand (RMNZ)	Gold	15,000^{‡}
United Kingdom (BPI)	Gold	400,000^{‡}
^{‡} Sales+streaming figures based on certification alone.
