= When Emma Falls in Love =

2023 song by Taylor Swift

Song by Taylor Swift

from the album Speak Now (Taylor's Version)
- Released: July 7, 2023
- Studio: Long Pond (Hudson Valley); Clubhouse (Rhinebeck, New York)
- Genre: Indie pop; country pop
- Length: 4:12
- Label: Republic
- Songwriter: Taylor Swift
- Producers: Taylor Swift; Aaron Dessner

Lyric video
- "When Emma Falls in Love" on YouTube

"When Emma Falls in Love" (Note: Officially titled "When Emma Falls in Love (Taylor's Version) (From the Vault)") is a song written and recorded by the American singer-songwriter Taylor Swift from her third re-recorded album, Speak Now (Taylor's Version) (2023). It is one of the album's "From the Vault" tracks that were intended for but excluded from her third studio album, Speak Now (2010). An indie pop and country pop ballad produced by Swift and Aaron Dessner, "When Emma Falls in Love" begins with a gentle production before building up to its chorus. The lyrics are about the narrator's experience of watching a friend fall in and out of love and her admiration for that friend.

Most critics who reviewed the album had positive comments on the track, while one found it cloying. Commercially, "When Emma Falls in Love" peaked at number 36 on the Billboard Global 200 and entered the charts in Australia, Canada, New Zealand, and the United States. It received a gold certification in Brazil.

== Background ==
After signing a new contract with Republic Records, the singer-songwriter Taylor Swift began re-recording her first six studio albums in November 2020. The decision followed a public 2019 dispute between Swift and the talent manager Scooter Braun, who acquired Big Machine Records, including the masters of Swift's albums which the label had released. By re-recording the albums, Swift had full ownership of the new masters, which enabled her to control the licensing of her songs for commercial use and therefore substituted the Big Machine–owned masters. In 2021, Swift released two re-recorded albums of her earlier releases: Fearless (Taylor's Version) and Red (Taylor's Version); each album also featured several unreleased "From the Vault" tracks that she had written but left out of the original albums' track listings.

On May 5, 2023, at the first Nashville date of her sixth concert tour, the Eras Tour, Swift announced Speak Now (Taylor's Version) as her third re-recorded album; it is the re-recording of her third studio album, Speak Now (2010). She shared on social media that the original album was "a tale of growing up, flailing, flying and crashing [...] and living to speak about it" that covered "brutal honesty, unfiltered diaristic confessions and wild wistfulness". On June 5, 2023, Swift announced the track-list of Speak Now (Taylor's Version), which consists six "From the Vault" songs were intended for but left out of Speak Now's 2010 track listing. One of them is "When Emma Falls in Love".

== Music and lyrics ==
"When Emma Falls in Love" is four minutes and twelve seconds long. Swift wrote the track and produced it with Aaron Dessner, who plays instruments including acoustic, bass, electric guitars, piano, and synthesizer. Other musicians on the song include Benjamin Lanz (synthesizer), James Krivchenia (drums, percussion), James McAlister (synthesizer, drums, percussion), and Josh Kaufman (electric guitar, banjo, organ). Christopher Rowe and Mike Meadows provide background vocals, and Rowe engineered the vocals. Dessner and Jonathan Low engineered the track, with assistance from Lans, McAlister, Bella Blasko, and Thomas Bartlett. Low mixed the song and Randy Merrill mastered it.

"When Emma Falls in Love" is an indie pop and country pop song. It begins as a gentle ballad alongside a "lilting piano that lends the song a childlike spirit". It builds up to an "explosive chorus". The song has a "classic Nashville pop-country backing" and crossover elements between country and pop, including the use of the banjo and a piano melody. The lyrics detail the narrator's experience of watching a friend fall in and out of love. The happy ending of the song, in which the friend and a boy begin a relationship, has been compared to that of "Love Story" (2008). In the last verse, the narrator sings how she has learned from her friend's experiences with love and laments "To tell you the truth, sometimes I wish I was her". Journalists observed that "When Emma Falls in Love" underscores the narrator's admiration for her friend. Elle Australia described it as "a friendship song showing all her friend's best qualities".

== Release and reception ==
Speak Now (Taylor's Version) was released on July 7, 2023, by Republic Records; "When Emma Falls in Love" sits at number 18 on the track-list. On the same day, Swift performed the track as a "surprise song" at Arrowhead Stadium in Kansas City, as part of the Eras Tour. Commercially, the song debuted on the US Hot Country Songs and the overall Billboard Hot 100, with peaks of number 15 and number 34 respectively. Elsewhere, it reached the countries of New Zealand (37), Canada (40), and Australia (43), and peaked at number 36 on the Billboard Global 200.

USA Today picked "When Emma Falls in Love" as the best "From the Vault" track from the album. Will Hodgkinson of The Times gave the song four out of five stars, describing it as "catchy and uplifting". Jonathan Keefe from Slant Magazine called the song "spectacular" and said it brings "some much-needed outside perspectives" to the album. Kate Solomon of the i considered the track "cloying" and said that she would never listen to it again.

== Credits and personnel ==
Credits are adapted from the album's liner notes.

Studios

- Engineered at Long Pond Studio, Hudson Valley and the Clubhouse, Rhinebeck, New York
- Swift's lead vocals recorded at Kitty Committee Studio, London, England
- Background vocals recorded at Blackbird Studio, Nashville, Tennessee
- Additionally recorded at Long Pond Studio, Hudson Valley
- Mixed at Long Pond Studio, Hudson Valley

Personnel

- Taylor Swift – vocals, songwriting, production
- Aaron Dessner – production, engineering, acoustic guitar, bass guitar, electric guitar, piano, synthesizer
- Benjamin Lanz – synthesizer, additional engineering
- James Krivchenia – drums, percussion
- James McAlister – synthesizer, drums, percussion, additional engineering
- Josh Kaufman – electric guitar, banjo, organ
- Christopher Rowe – background vocals, vocal engineering
- Mike Meadows – background vocals
- Jonathan Low – mixing, engineering
- Randy Merrill – mastering
- Bella Blasko – additional engineering
- Thomas Bartlett – additional engineering

== Charts ==
Chart performance
Chart (2023)	Peak position
Australia (ARIA)	43
Canada Hot 100 (Billboard)	40
Global 200 (Billboard)	36
New Zealand (Recorded Music NZ)	37
UK Streaming (OCC)	70
US Billboard Hot 100	34
US Hot Country Songs (Billboard)	15

== Certifications ==
Certifications
Region	Certification	Certified units/sales
Brazil (Pro-Música Brasil)	Gold	20,000^{‡}
^{‡} Sales+streaming figures based on certification alone.
