= Maura Johnston =

American journalist

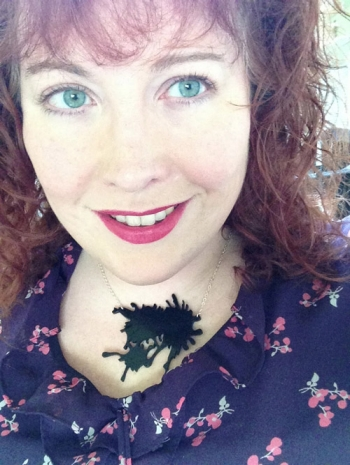
- Johnston in 2013
- Born: May 28, 1975 (age 51); Syosset, New York, United States
- Education: Northwestern University
- Occupations: Music critic, music journalist
- Writing career
- Years active: 1997–present
- Website: maura.com

Maura K. Johnston (born May 28, 1975) is an American writer, editor and music critic. A member of Boston College's journalism faculty, she has written for Rolling Stone, The Boston Globe, Pitchfork, The Awl, The New York Times, Spin and The Guardian.

Johnston was a founding editor of Gawker Media's Idolator, where she worked until November 2009. In April 2011, she became the music editor of The Village Voice, holding that position until September 2012. In 2013, she launched the culture periodical Maura Magazine, which was published by 29th Street Publishing through 2015.

She is an adjunct professor at Boston College, which named her the inaugural Institute for Liberal Arts Journalism Fellow in 2013. From 2010 to 2013, she taught at New York University's Clive Davis Institute of Recorded Music.

Johnston is involved with Boston College's non-commercial radio station WZBC as a DJ and advisory board member and has DJed at WNUR and WPRB. She has discussed music and popular culture on NPR, WNYC, WBUR and CBC Radio. She has appeared in a handful of music videos, including Speedy Ortiz's "The Graduates", and contributed violin and viola to records by artists including Lefty's Deceiver and Kincaid.

A native of Hicksville, New York, Johnston graduated from Northwestern University in 1997.
