= Amos Heller (musician) =

American bassist

- Heller in 2023
- Born: Charlottesville, Virginia
- Education: Miami University
- Occupation: Bassist

Amos Heller is an American bassist. He is best known for his work as the bassist in Taylor Swift's touring band: 'the Agency', since its formation in 2007. He has played in every major tour, including the highest grossing tour of all time, The Eras Tour.

== Life and career ==
Heller grew up in Charlottesville, Virginia and attended Charlottesville High School. He is an alumnus of Miami University, graduating in 2000 with a major in sociology. During his time in both the public school system and at university, he played upright bass in the respective orchestras.

At age ten, Heller started playing the upright, borrowing his school's bass to learn metal songs. He has said that he would often learn songs off of Metallica's 1983 album Kill 'Em All. He continued to learn the classical upright bass for the next decade but it was at age 13 that he got his first electric bass, an Ibanez EXB 404.

At university, he realized that he preferred to play in cover bands due to higher attendance and this was a pattern that continued after he graduated and moved to Cincinnati. An opportunity arose when local producer Ric Hordinski began to offer a more substantial amount of studio work. The issue was, in Cincinnati Heller felt that the opportunities were limited. This inspired him to move to Nashville, Tennessee in 2005, which is sometimes called "Music City". It was here in Tennessee that Heller progressed from cover bands to tour busses, joining Rhett Akins and then Josh Gracin. He performed with Gracin for troops in Kuwait and Iraq in 2007 on a Stars for Stripes tour. But it was actually the drummer who he had played his first ever gig in Nashville with, Al Wilson, who connected him to Swift, then an emerging artist.

He is very vocal about his admiration for Swift and features in the Disney+ docuseries Taylor Swift: The End of an Era. He has also said that he particularly enjoyed playing the higher energy songs on the Eras tour, specifically mentioning Don't Blame Me and I Knew You Were Trouble.

=== Influences ===
He states that he loves Metal and has mentioned specifically Metallica, Megadeth, Faith No More, Pantera, and Sepultura as his favourite bands from when he was young. In 2023, he gave a more concise list of influences including Cliff Burton, Flea, Mike Dirnt, and Victor Wooten.

=== Business ===
Heller and Darkglass Electronics released the "Kaamos" overdrive and octaver bass pedal in 2025 which was met with critical acclaim receiving a four and half out of 5 star review from the Musicradar magazine. He has also released a signature PJ bass guitar model with Mike Lull Custom Guitars called the AHPJ4.
