= The Red Tour =

2013–2014 concert tour by Taylor Swift

- Tour by Taylor Swift
- Promotional poster for the tour
- Location: North America; Oceania; Australia; Europe; Asia
- Associated album: Red
- Start date: March 13, 2013
- End date: June 12, 2014
- No. of shows: 86
- Supporting acts: Ed Sheeran; Austin Mahone; Florida Georgia Line; Brett Eldredge; Joel Crouse; Casey James; Guy Sebastian; Neon Trees; Andreas Bourani; The Vamps; Nicole Zefanya; CTS; Meg Bucsit; Imprompt-3; IamNeeta
- Attendance: 1.7 million
- Box office: $150.2 million ($204.27 million in 2025 dollars)

Taylor Swift concert chronology
- Speak Now World Tour (2011–2012); The Red Tour (2013–2014); The 1989 World Tour (2015)

The Red Tour was the third concert tour by the American singer-songwriter Taylor Swift, in support of her fourth studio album, Red (2012). It began in Omaha, Nebraska, on March 13, 2013, and concluded in Singapore, on June 12, 2014. The tour covered 86 shows that spanned 12 countries across Asia–Pacific, Europe, and North America.

The set list consisted of songs mostly from Red, with a few numbers taken from Swift's previous albums, Fearless (2008) and Speak Now (2010). Swift played various instruments such as electric guitar, acoustic guitar, banjo, and piano to perform several numbers, while other songs were accompanied by costume changes, bands, and choreographies. During several shows, Swift invited surprise guests onstage to sing with her, and she performed surprise songs outside the regular set list on acoustic guitar. The Red Tour was generally well received in the press, with critics praising her stage presence and songwriting while also opining that it demonstrated Swift's pop-star prowess that was outgrowing her country music origins.

Swift had integrated partnerships with Diet Coke, Keds, and Elizabeth Arden to promote the Red Tour. The Southeast Asian leg was additionally promoted via tie-ins with Cornetto and AirAsia. The Red tour was attended by 1.7 million people and grossed $150.2 million in revenue, becoming the highest-grossing North American tour of 2013 and the highest-grossing country tour of all time, surpassing Tim McGraw and Faith Hill's Soul2Soul II Tour. In Australia, it made Swift the first female artist to headline a stadium tour since Madonna in 1993 and the first female artist to sell out Sydney's Allianz Stadium in its history. The tour won Top Package at the Billboard Touring Awards in 2013.

== Background ==
Taylor Swift's fourth studio album, Red, was released on October 22, 2012, through Big Machine Records. While Swift and Big Machine promoted the album to country radio, it incorporates elements from different genres of rock, pop, and electronic. Red debuted at number one on the US Billboard 200 chart with first-week sales of 1.208 million copies, surpassing Garth Brooks's Double Live (1998) as the fastest-selling country album.

On October 26, 2012, Swift announced the Red Tour on the primetime TV special of 20/20 with the journalist Katie Couric; the tour was set to commence from early 2013 across North American stadiums and arenas. The first North American leg consisted of 58 shows in 45 cities in 29 US states and 3 Canadian provinces, starting on March 13, 2013, in Omaha, Nebraska. The opening act was announced to be Ed Sheeran, who would tour with Swift on all North American shows. In January and February 2013, Swift announced additional dates in East Rutherford and Edmonton. Austin Mahone, Joel Crouse, Brett Eldredge, Florida Georgia Line, and Casey James were announced as opening acts on different North American dates.

In May 2013, Swift announced Australian and New Zealand dates of the Red Tour, visiting four stadiums in Melbourne, Sydney, Perth, and Brisbane, and one arena in Auckland. Neon Trees and Guy Sebastian were confirmed as these dates' supporting acts. She further announced dates for England and Germany upon finishing the North American leg in September 2013, with the Vamps confirmed as the London opening act the following month. In February 2014, Swift announced the Asian leg of the tour, with shows in Jakarta, Manila, Bangkok, Kuala Lumpur, and Singapore slated for June. She later announced additional dates for Tokyo and Shanghai. On May 24, 2014, the tour promoter BEC-Tero announced that the sold-out Bangkok show had to be cancelled, citing the 2014 Thai coup d'état and surrounding political instability.

== Planning and development ==
"When I was conceptualizing [the Red Tour] from the very beginning, I thought about how if [Speak Now and Red tours] were to exist in two different worlds, I picture the Speak Now tour existing in a Midsummer Night's Dream/Romeo and Juliet-inspired fantasyland, and I picture this taking place in New York City. And so you've got high intensity excitement and you've got the darkness of all of it and you've got all the fleeting moments of reality, and it's a little bit less of a fairy tale."

— Swift on the concept of the Red Tour

Planning for the Red Tour began in the summer of 2012, around eight months prior to its kickoff. The planning encompassed stage design, set list creation, costume design, dancer selection, and rehearsals that lasted one month. Swift said that she wanted the Red Tour to convey a different experience than her last tour, the Speak Now World Tour: whereas her previous tour embodied a "fantasy oriented, a very princessy vibe", the Red Tour would include not as many gowns or theatrical elements. She thought of the Red Tour as "mature and a bit more sophisticated".

Red shades dominated the props and settings of the concerts, including musical instruments, microphones, costumes, stages, and audience lighting. Swift collaborated with the producer Baz Halpin to design and direct the stage of the Red Tour, having worked with him on the Speak Now World Tour. According to Halpin, he designed the stage to accompany Swift's desire to stay connected with her audience as much as possible, and she was involved in selecting all options in the early design stage. Each number was accompanied with a distinctive aesthetic: a carousel on which the band performed for "Stay Stay Stay" and "Mean", a haunted house for "I Knew You Were Trouble", a circus for "We Are Never Ever Getting Back Together", a New York cityscape for "Holy Ground", and a 1920s Hollywood backdrop for "The Lucky One".

Swift's seven-member band included a pianist, two guitarists, a violinist, a bass guitarist, a multi-string instrumentalist, and a drummer. Supporting Swift on stage were four backing vocalists who had performed "We Are Never Ever Getting Back Together" with her at the 2012 MTV Video Music Awards and 15 dancers selected by Swift and her mother from over 400 people through auditions in early 2013. After six months of the concert run, three dancers left to join another tour, leaving the number of dancers to 12. Talking to Rolling Stone in August 2013, Swift said that she strived to perform better to serve her fans and that having stadium concerts made her more mature as a performer.

=== Stage design ===
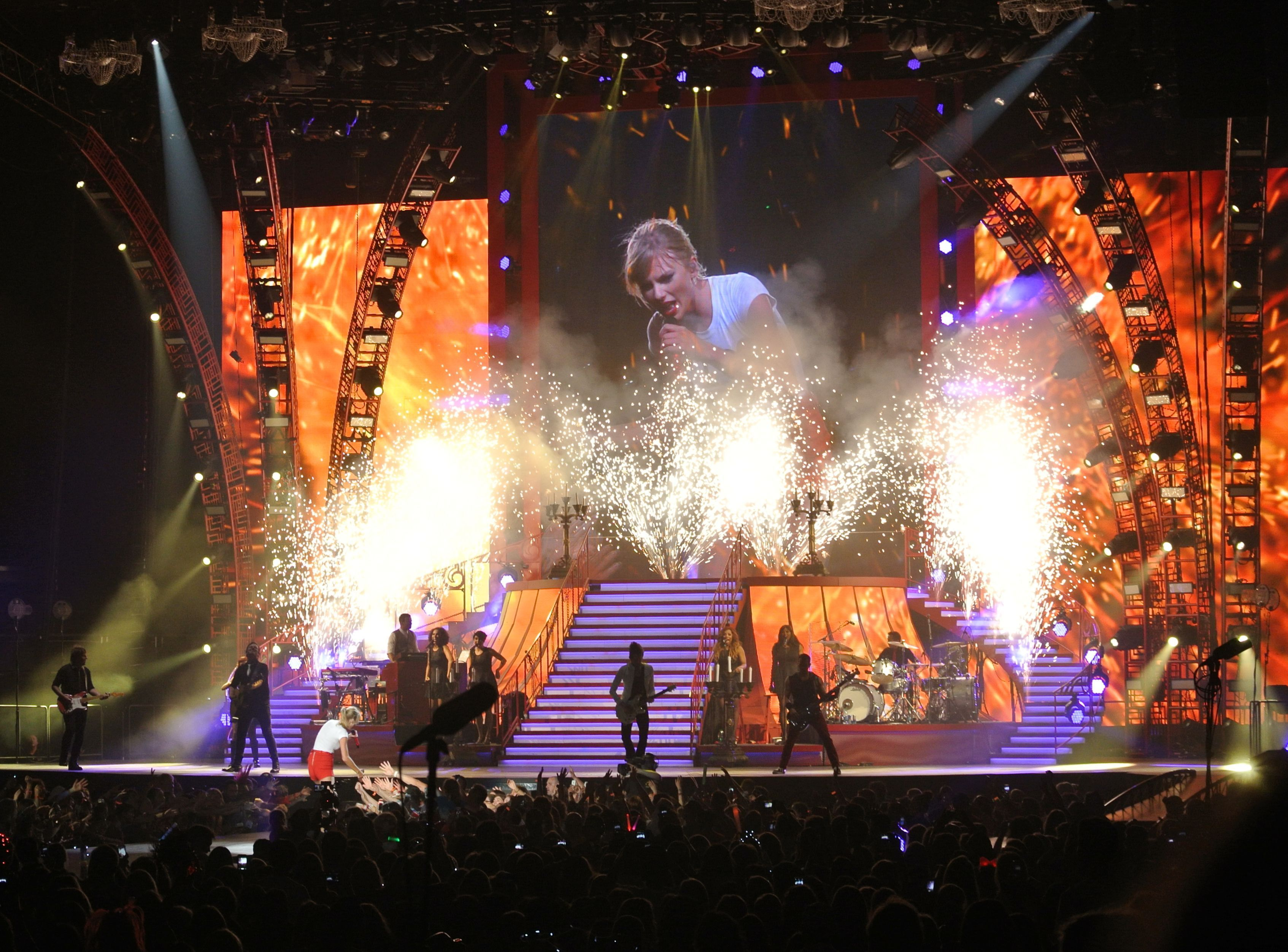
The main stage featured three staircases, projecting screens, and three aisles surrounding two spaces for standing tickets.

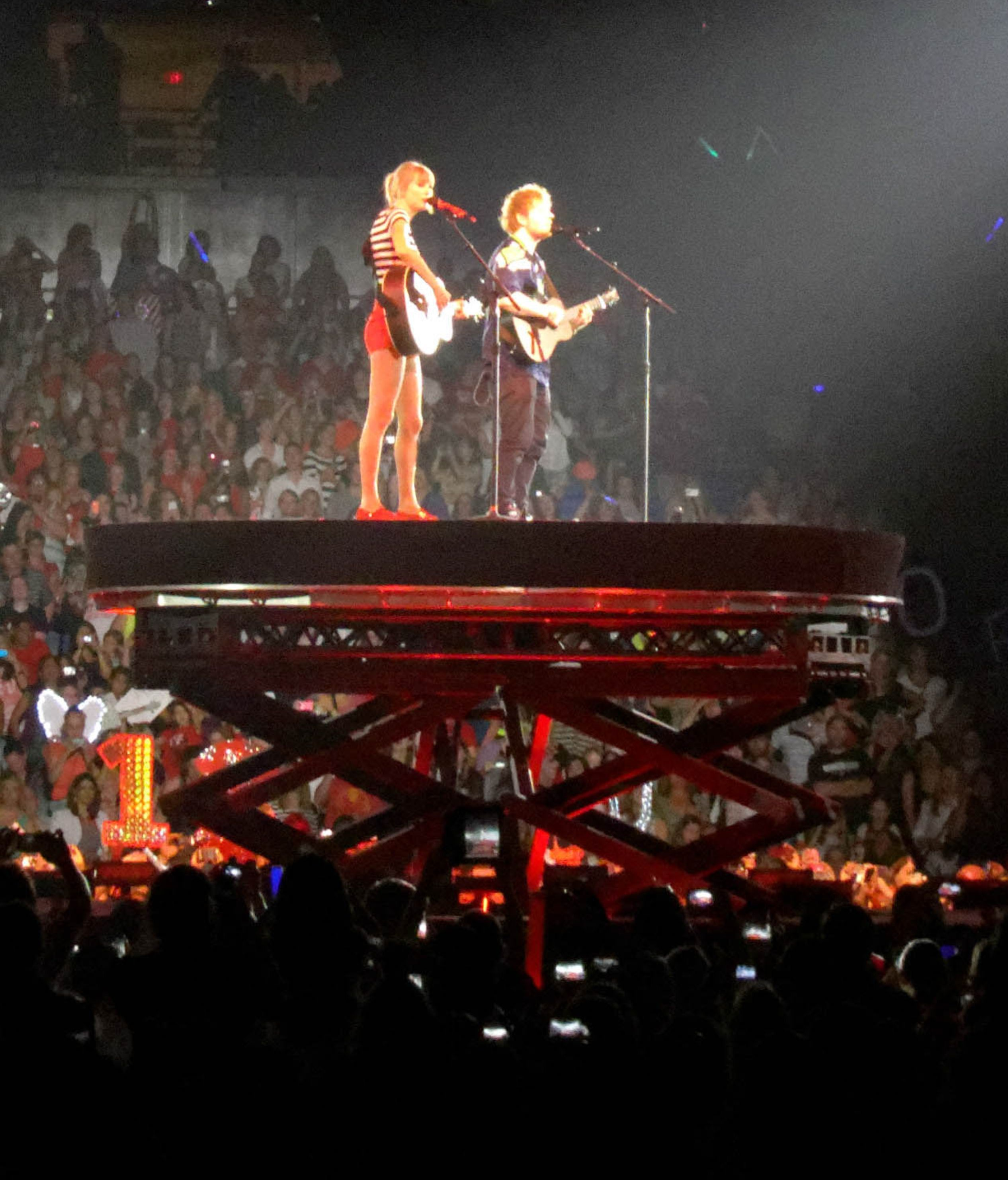
The B stage was elevated using a hydraulic system; Swift is seen performing with Ed Sheeran.

The concerts included two stages; the main stage included three staircases and an extended stage towards the audience. It was semicircular, divided into three aisles surrounding two empty spaces for standing tickets in the middle. The aisle in the middle of the stage contained a runway that could be raised a few feet and rotated by a hydraulic system. The stage was equipped with a fireworks system, a LED lighting system, nine large screens (including a curved videowall made up of five small screens blocking the stage), and two elevators to take Swift up and down backstage. For stadiums, Swift rented a canopy system built on four steel pillars from Stageco for the main stage.

The drum set used in "Holy Ground" glowed up when Swift and the dancers beat on them using fluorescent cylinders; this set consisted of two parts: one onstage with Swift and the other hanging from the ceiling. The smaller B stage was located on the other side of the performance venue, with a circular rotating platform in the middle also using a hydraulic system, which could be raised about 15 feet, where Swift performed songs on acoustic guitar. The arena shows also included a flying cage that carried Swift over the audience to move her from the B stage back to the main stage. Inside the backstage was "Club Red", a room decorated with images and costumes she had worn on stage, where Swift met and interacted with some selected fans and the media before or after the show.

The Red Tour traveled across North America with 24 tractors carrying stage installation equipment and lighting, along with 15 buses carrying 80 staff members. If the concert took place at outdoor stadiums, the fleet also included a truck carrying a steel frame structure to build the canopy for the stage. At each venue, the tour management team hired 120–150 local workers to help with the setup. The dismantling process began immediately after the performance ended and usually took about four hours to complete. Many props, musical instruments, and costumes used in the tour were later displayed in some music museums, and in a series of exhibitions titled "The Taylor Swift Experience" at the Grammy Museum at L.A. Live.

=== Sound and lighting ===
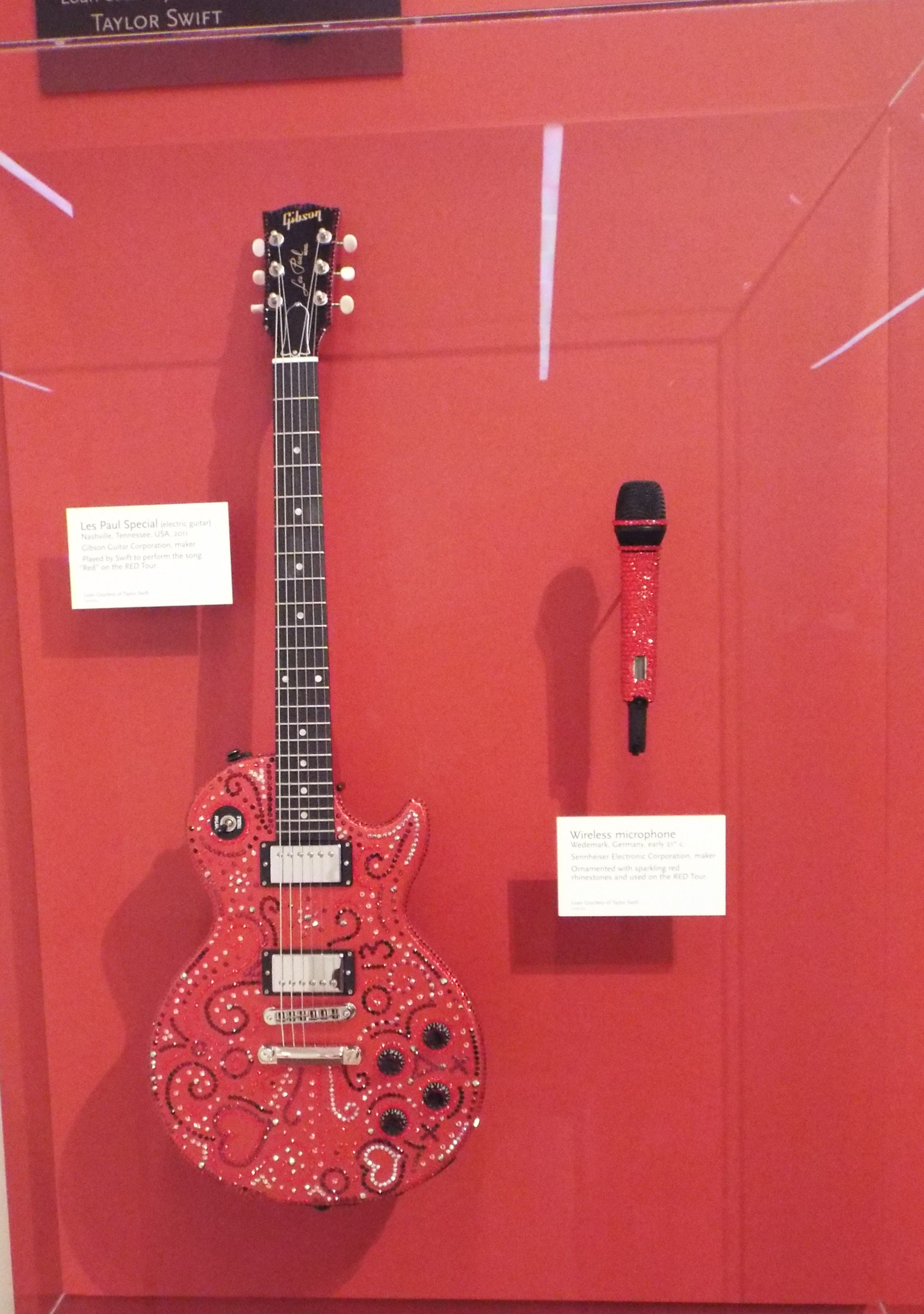
Swift's Les Paul guitar from the tour, on display at the Musical Instrument Museum of Phoenix

There were 73 musical instruments used in the tour, 13 of which were Swift's. Eighth Day Sound Systems provided the sound system and equipment for the Red Tour, which used three DiGiCo SD7 digital mixing consoles and a d&b audiotechnik speaker system from JPJ Audio. David Payne, a sound engineer who had worked with Swift for over four and a half years, chose the SD7 mixing console because of its layout, quality, and ability to handle sound effects and integrate with the SoundGrid wave bundling system. Every member onstage had a separate in-ear monitor, except for the dancers who shared one ear mix. The tour carried an additional spare room with 8 d&b audiotechnik M4 monitoring speakers for the opening act and special guests duetting with Swift. The sound team worked with about 96 input channels from the stage (mostly from wireless microphones and instruments) plus 12 audience microphones arranged around the performance venue for the Pro Tools recording tool. Swift used four separate microphones at different times.

Eighth Day Sound Systems collaborated with JPI Audio to provide the sound system for the concerts in Australia. There were 11 sound engineers working per night, including two engineers on each side of the stage, two monitoring engineers, two engineers in charge of audio delay, one front of house (FOH) engineer, one system/FOH engineer, and one RF engineer cum technical team leader. Three trucks were used to transport the sound system. Halpin used SGM's multi-color XC-5s LED lights for the Red Tour. There were 42 XC-5 lights used in the lighting system, provided by Production Resource Group.

=== Wardrobe ===
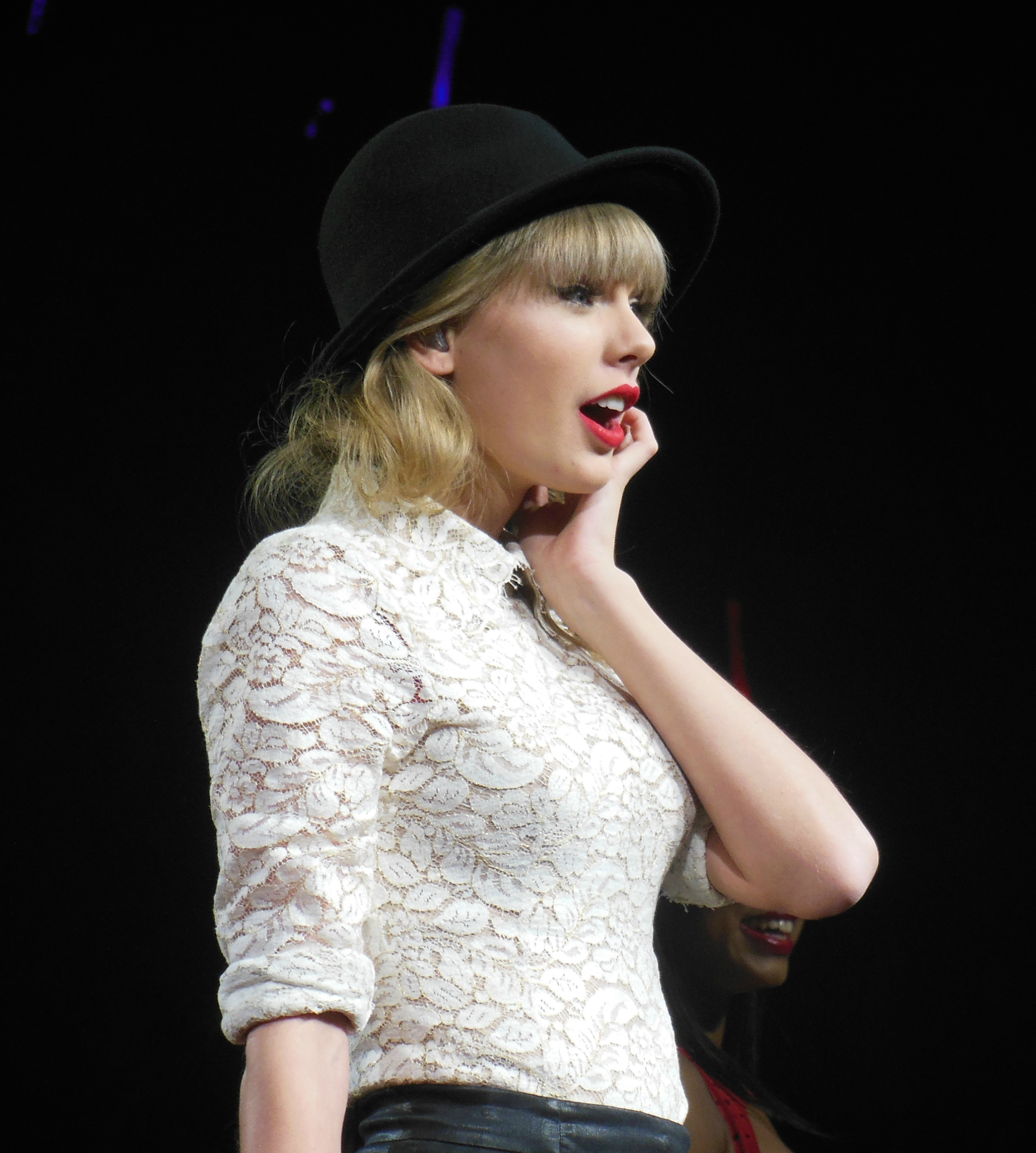
Swift in a laced Oxford shirt, black high-waisted leather shorts, a black hat, and red lipstick during "Holy Ground"

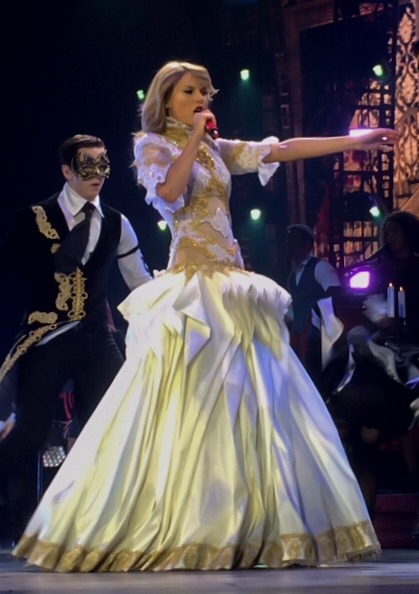
Swift in a Victorian-inspired gown singing "I Knew You Were Trouble"

Marina Toybina was the main costume designer for the Red Tour. There were 128 costumes used, including 23 for Swift and 103 for the dancers. Swift's wardrobe was provided by different fashion brands: black high-waisted leather shorts from Bleulab, a cummerbund from Kate Spade, oxford shoes from Miu Miu and Lanvin, dresses from J. Mendel, boots from LaDuca, and a white corset from Moschino. According to Toybina, she designed the costumes after Swift created the set list and discussed the choreography, believing that they reflected the inspirations of each song as well as her individuality. After Swift approved the designs, Toybina and her team proceeded with fabric selection, sewing, and creating additional accessories. It took Toybina a little more than three weeks to complete the wardrobe.

Costumes used in the Red Tour were strongly tied with the album's theme: the white shirt and brimmed hat of the album cover, striped shirts, oxford shoes, pork pie hats, and high-waisted shorts. According to Vogue Germany, Swift's outfits on the Red Tour showcased a more urban and sporty aesthetic than her previous country image: T-shirts and shorts paired with flat shoes, although some dresses were paired with high heels as well. In an interview with Keds, one of the tour's sponsor, Swift said her favorite costume was the first outfit of the show: a white laced Oxford shirt, black high-waisted leather shorts, a black hat, and oxford shoes. She added that she was not only concerned with the appearance of the costumes, but also their "functionality": "Can I run around in this? Is this something that I can throw my hair around in?" Regarding makeup, Swift said that red lipstick was a must and that she preferred using long-lasting lipstick over regular oil-based lipstick, and that she wanted a "perfectly angled cat eye look".

=== Sponsors ===
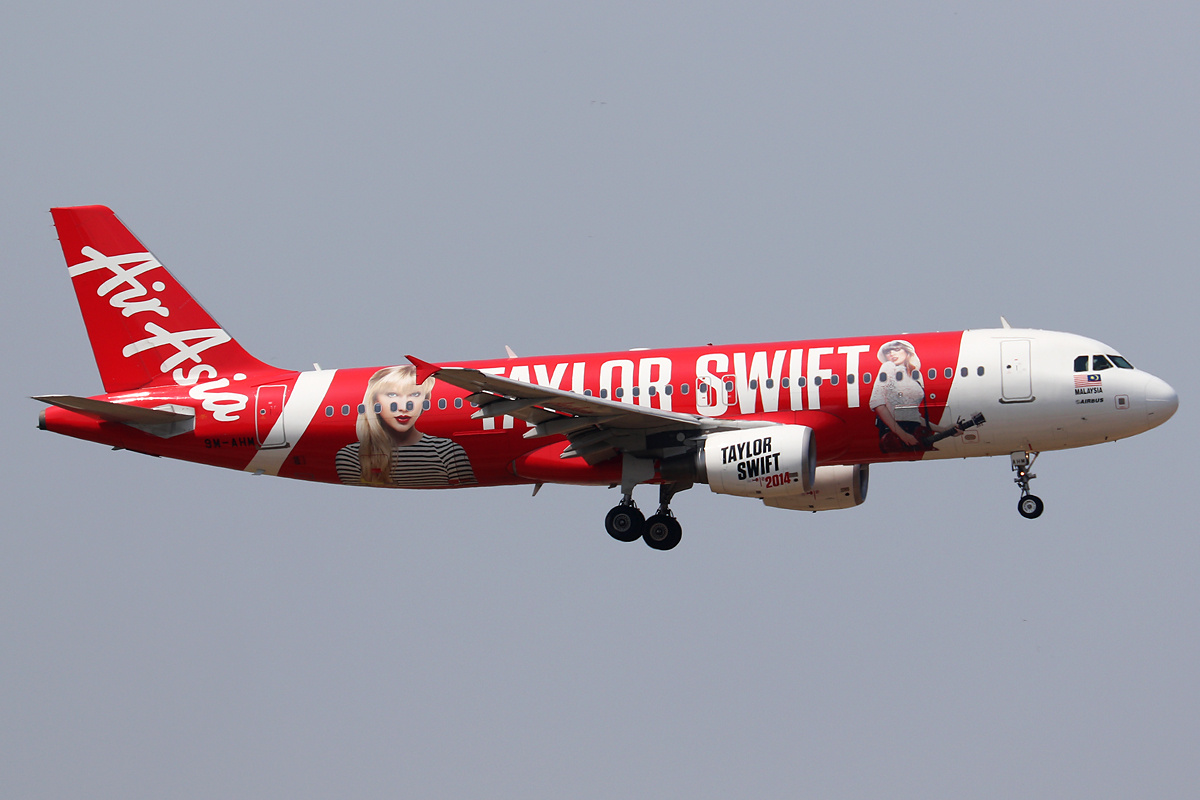
An AirAsia Airbus A320 aircraft with Taylor Swift livery, February 2015

AEG Live was the tour's promoter in North America and Asia, while Frontier Touring promoted it in Australia and New Zealand, and Semmel Concerts and Peter Rieger Konzertagentur in Germany. Swift had integrated sponsorships with three brands for the North American leg: Diet Coke, Keds, and Elizabeth Arden. The Diet Coke deal provided fans "extraordinary access to Swift", while the Keds deal included a limited-edition Champion series featuring the names of each city that the tour visited, and the Elizabeth Arden deal launched Swift-branded fragrances. In Australia and New Zealand, Qantas was the tour's official airline.

Sponsors for the Southeast Asian shows included the ice cream brand Cornetto and the airline AirAsia. Cornetto also partnered with Sony Music to create the "Ride to Fame Competition" where participants had a chance to become an opening act for Swift. AirAsia served as the official tour airline with a specialized Airbus A320 aircraft that carried Swift and her crew across the Southeast Asian stops. The airline also designed a Taylor Swift livery for the aircraft that featured her name and photos for one year. AIA and HotLink were additional sponsors in Malaysia, and Fox and Star World in the Philippines. Toyota was the official automotive sponsor for the tour in Southeast Asia, collaborating with Swift to campaign for the company's first ASEAN road safety initiative that included educational videos for young people in Indonesia, Malaysia, the Philippines, Thailand, and Vietnam.

== Concert synopsis ==
Swift used Icona Pop's 2012 single "I Love It" and Lenny Kravitz's 1999 rendition of "American Woman" as her entrance songs. The set list consisted of songs mostly from Red and a few from Swift's past albums, Fearless (2008) and Speak Now (2010). Additionally, Swift performed many "surprise songs" in acoustic versions on different nights by learning fan requests through social media. Several numbers, like "Everything Has Changed" and "Stay Stay Stay", were excluded from the shows in Oceania and Asia.

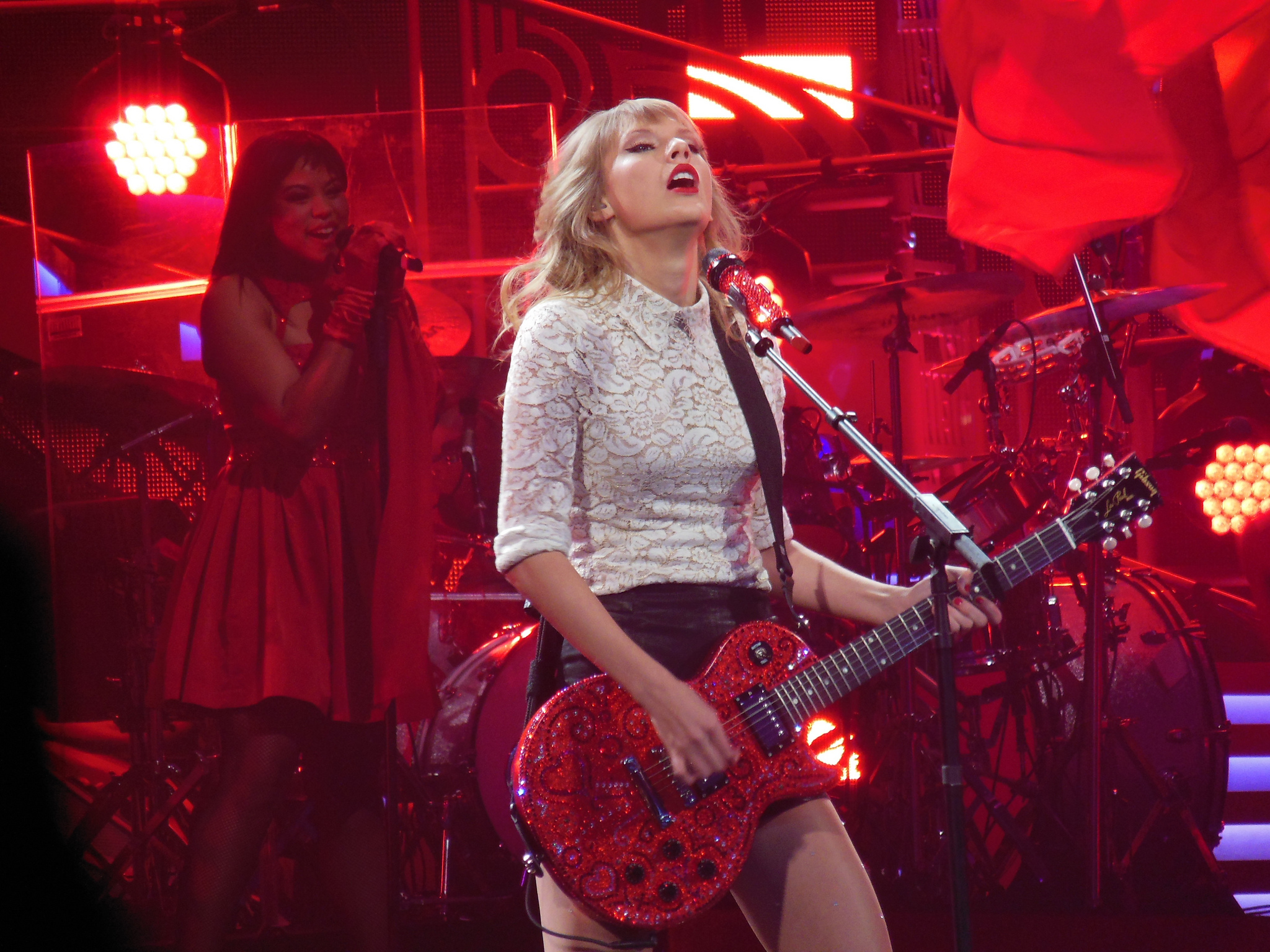
Swift playing "Red" on a red Les Paul electric guitar

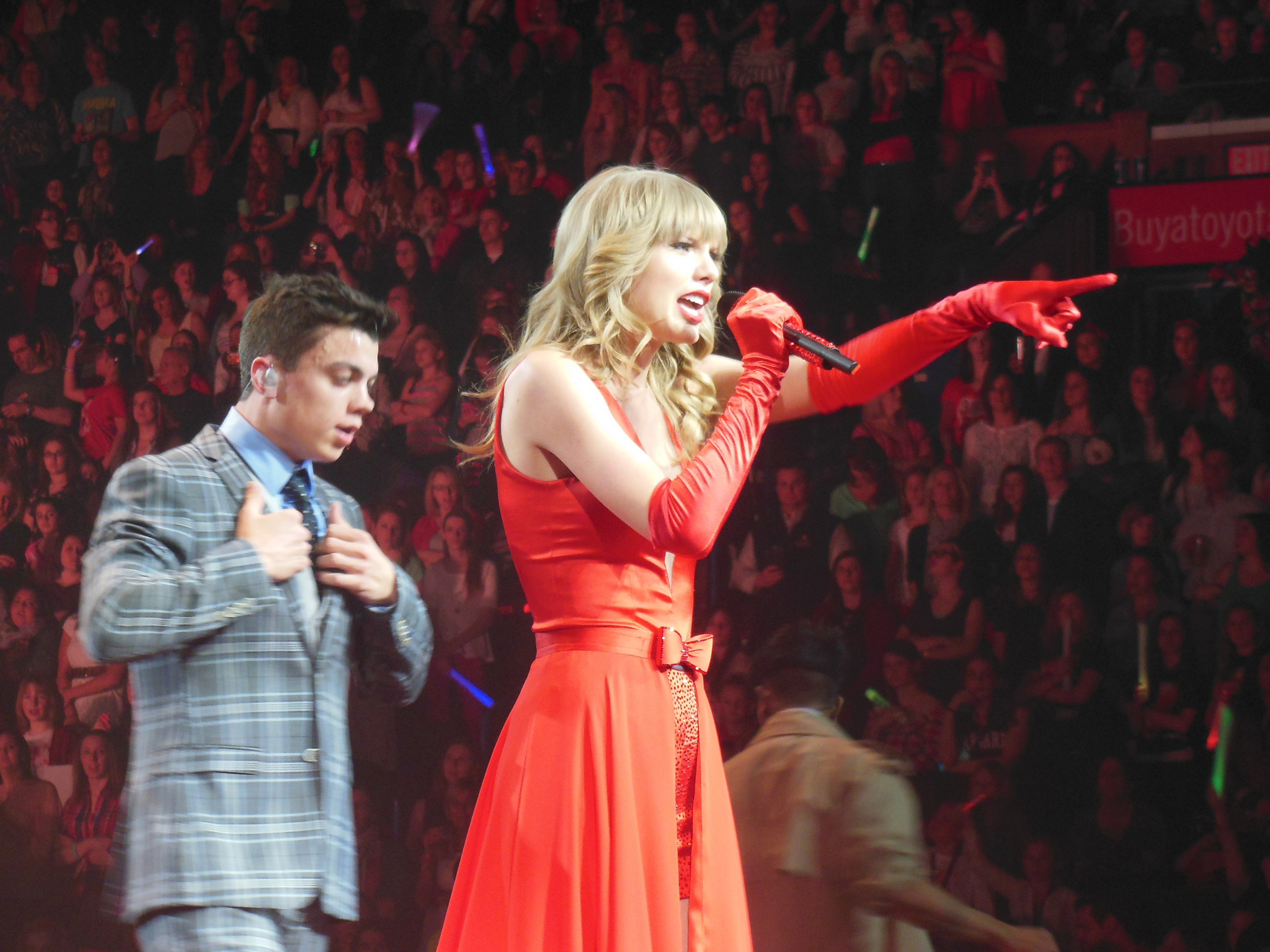
Swift wearing red gown and gloves for "The Lucky One"

The performance began as five screens blocking the stage slowly rose and Swift's silhouette appeared on a large red screen as she prepared to perform "State of Grace". The large screen was quickly pulled up to reveal the entire stage, and Swift performed the song in a white shirt, black shorts, a black hat, and red sequined shoes. The number ended with fireworks falling from the ceiling. She followed with "Holy Ground", where she and the dancers performed with a set of illuminated drums. She put on a red sparkling Les Paul electric guitar to perform "Red" while the dancers carried red flags running around the stage. Towards the end of "Red", Swift played a guitar solo with a band member who also played a red glittery guitar.

The five screens were lowered, and Swift along with four backing vocalists dressed like a 1960s girl group to perform "You Belong with Me", which was transformed from a country pop track to a Motown-styled number interspersed with heavy bass. (Note: In some performances such as in Oceania and Asia, Swift performed "You Belong with Me" in an acoustic version on the B stage.) The performance of "The Lucky One" was introduced by a black-and-white film featuring Swift sitting in a 1920s Hollywood-styled chamber and her monologue about the dangers of fame. She appeared onstage to perform the song in a full-red outfit that consisted of a long-tailed dress, shorts, arms-long gloves, and boots, surrounded by dancers dressed as paparazzi in trench coats. Returning to the stage after changing the long dress into a white short skirt, Swift played "Mean" on a banjo, sitting on a treasure chest, accompanied by a set piece where her band members portrayed different characters on a carousel. She followed with "Stay Stay Stay", which contained portions of "Ho Hey" by the Lumineers towards its end.

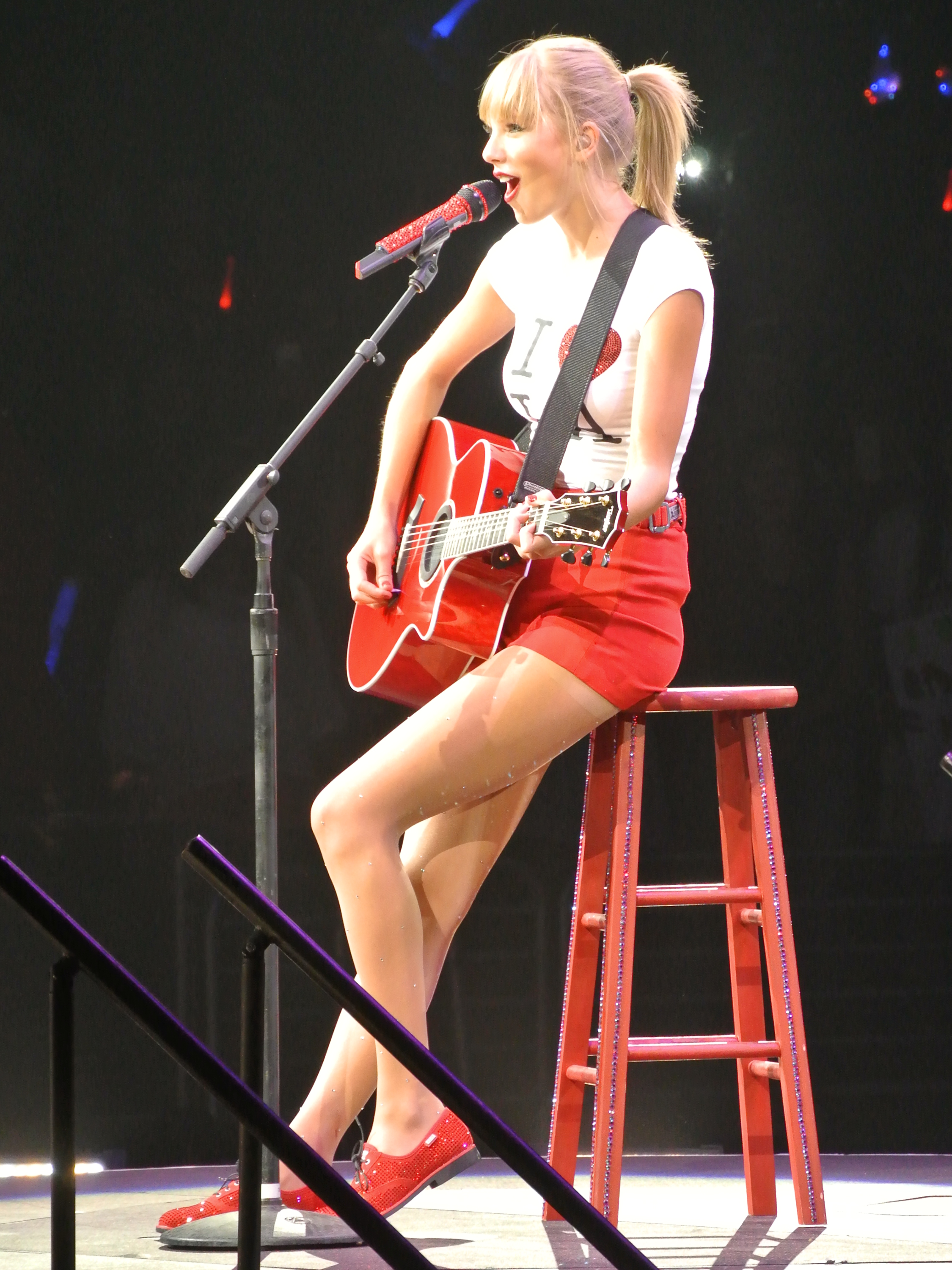
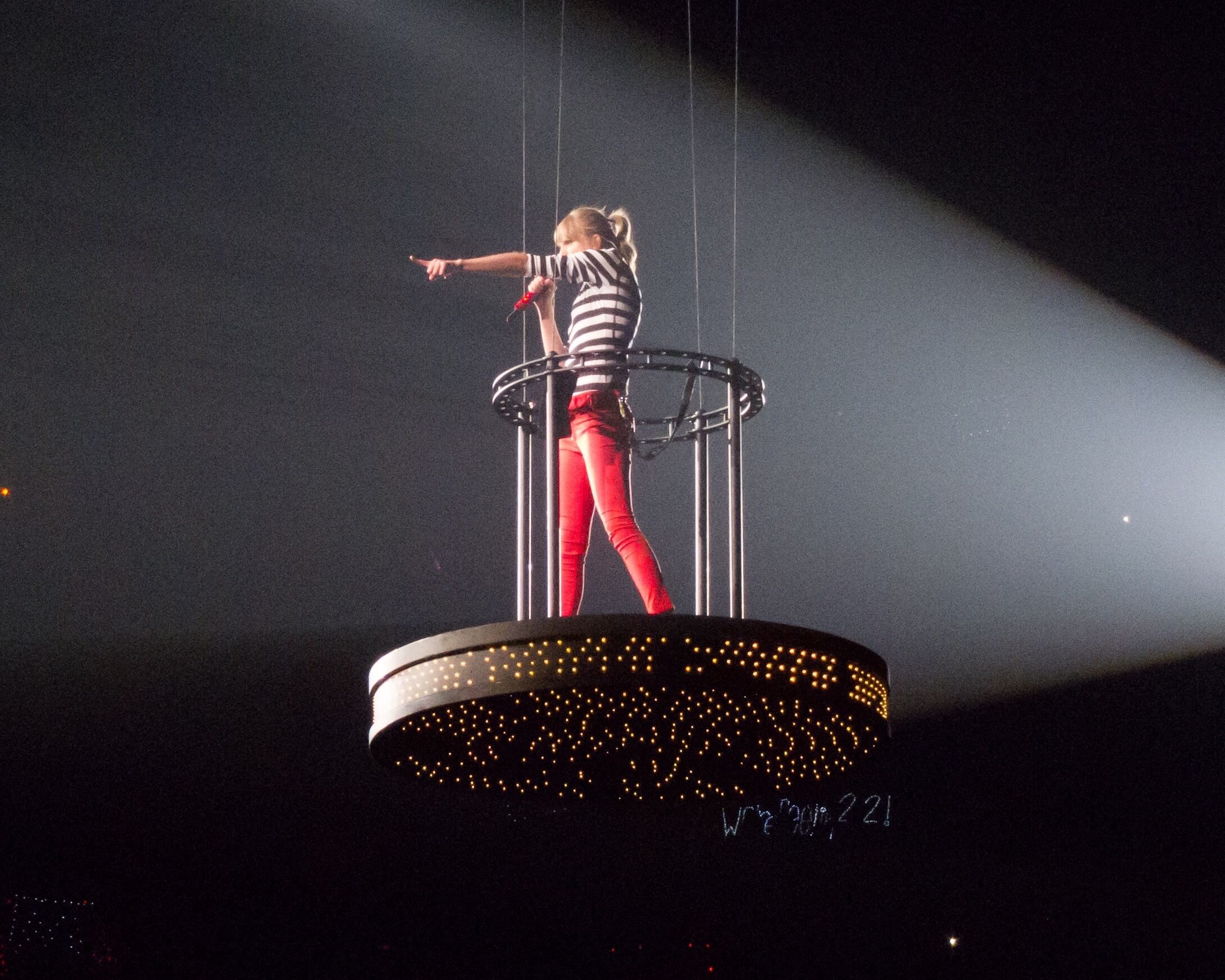
Swift performed acoustic numbers on the B stage (left) before moving back to the main stage in a flying cage while performing "Sparks Fly" (right).

The concert continued with a short film that documented Swift's evolution from childhood to age 21. It introduced the next number, "22", which featured Swift in a white striped T-shirt, red pants, and a ponytail, and an energetic choreography. Towards the end of "22", she was carried to the B stage on the shoulders of her backup dancers. On the B stage, which was a rotating platform, Swift performed songs on an acoustic guitar, sitting on a red barstool. She opened the acoustic segment with a different song each night, having read fan requests via social media such as Twitter to learn about what her fans wanted to hear live. She continued with "Everything Has Changed" with Ed Sheeran and "Begin Again" before concluding this segment with "Sparks Fly", which she performed on a 12-string guitar briefly before entering a flying cage that carried her way back to the main stage. (Note: At several concerts, Swift walked back to the main stage, greeting and shaking hands with the audience instead.)

The next number, "I Knew You Were Trouble", began with the fiddler playing solo as fog swirled around her. Swift began the song, wearing a Victorian-inspired white gown interspersed with gold accents. The dancers wore masks and dressed as masquerade ball attendees, performing a Gothic-inspired choreography. Midway through the act, her dancers ripped off the gown to reveal an outfit combining a black leather top with gold embroidery on the sides, high-waisted pants, and knee-high boots. After finishing the song, Swift put on a black laced dress and performed "All Too Well" on a red piano.

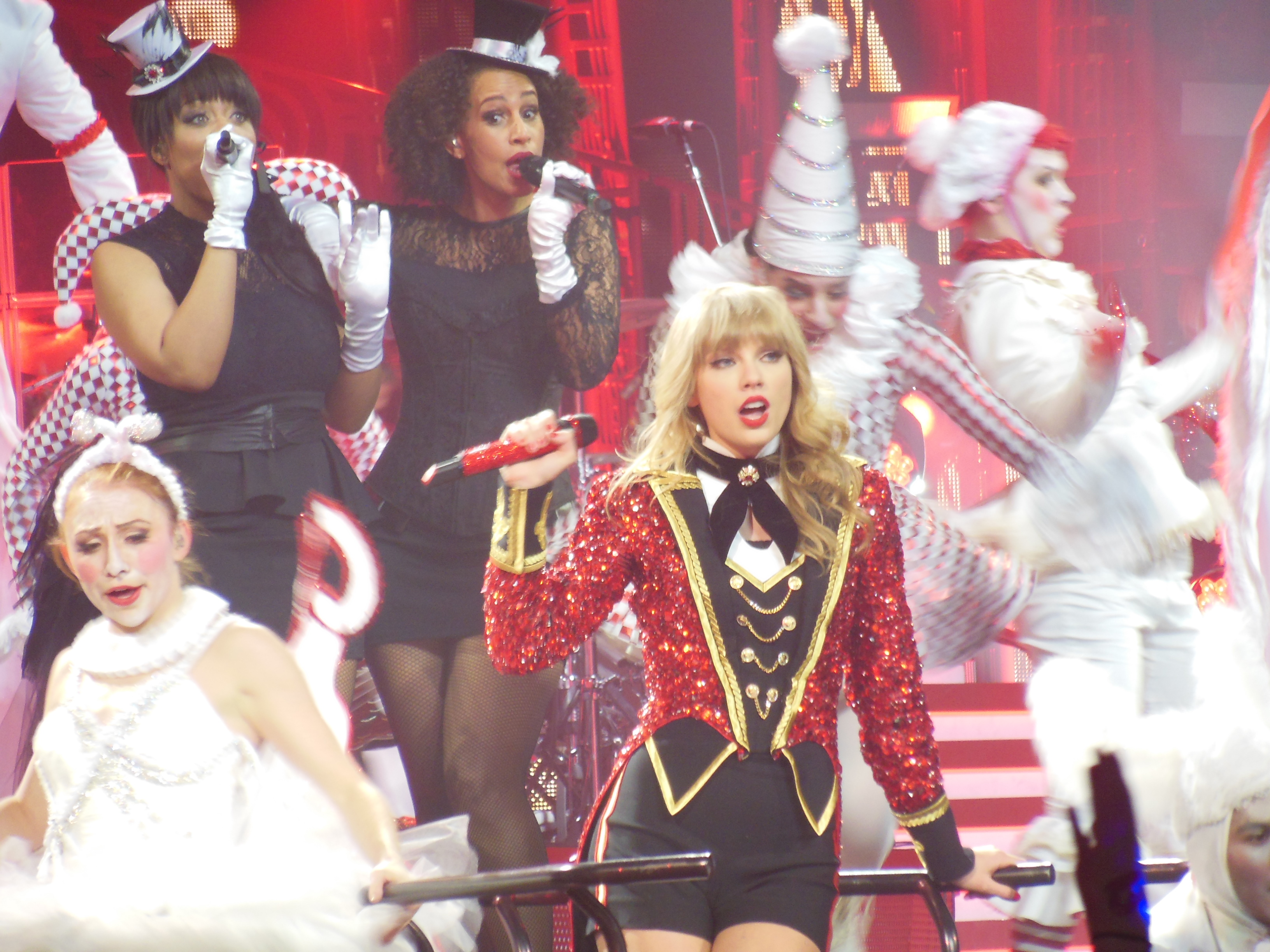
Swift playing a circus ringmaster during "We Are Never Ever Getting Back Together", the closing number

The next number, "Love Story", opened with dancers dressed as dolls emerging from a music box. Swift wore a long white dress as she stepped out of the box barefoot and, along with the dancers, reenacted the play Romeo and Juliet with a happy ending. After quickly changing costumes, Swift returned to the stage in a black sparkling backless top and a white tutu skirt to perform "Treacherous" barefoot on a narrow arm in the center of the stage that rose up several feet from the second half of the song.

The concert concluded with "We Are Never Ever Getting Back Together". The performance was staged like a circus, inspired by the novel Alice's Adventures in Wonderland, with dancers dressed as various characters: a clown walking on stilts holding a red umbrella, a jester in red and white checkered clothes, a fairy in a tutu skirt, and rabbits; Swift was dressed as the ringmaster, in a red sequined jacket and a tall hat. The runway between the stage rose and spun over the audience's heads, and Swift asked the audience to sing along with her and ended the song with confetti and fireworks. After saluting the audience with her band, Swift went up the stairs and disappeared from the stage before the five screens lowered and the words "Thank You :)" scrolled across.

== Ticket sales and box office ==
Tickets for the Red Tour went on sales on November 16, 2012, for shows in North America, May 21, 2013, for Australia and New Zealand, October 4, 2013, for the UK, and October 25, 2013, for Germany. Ticket sales for the Asian shows depended on each location's organizers. Tickets for many concerts sold out quickly: 14 dates sold out within one day of sale; the San Diego show and initial two Los Angeles shows sold out within 60 seconds; the Toronto, two Washington, D.C. shows, and two Atlanta shows in 5 minutes; the Detroit show in 10 minutes; and the Chicago show in under 30 minutes. Swift added shows in Toronto, Foxborough, Philadelphia, and Los Angeles in response to the high demand.

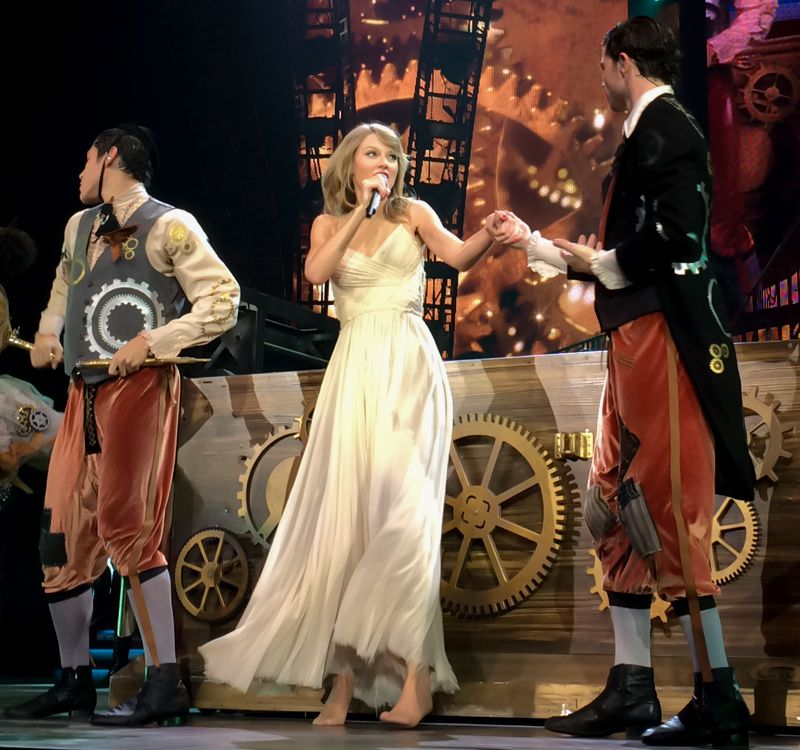
Swift performing "Love Story" at the O2 Arena in London; high demand for the tour made her extend the London gig to five shows.

Sold-out dates also led to additional concerts announced for Auckland and London, while most Asian dates—Manila, Kuala Lumpur, Bangkok (later cancelled), Tokyo—sold out within hours. All 18,000 tickets for the Shanghai show sold out within one minute, registering the Red Tour as the fastest-selling concert in Chinese history. After canceling the Bangkok show due to political unrest, Swift added a second show in Singapore to replace that concert for June 9, 2014, with priority given to those who had purchased tickets in Bangkok. The Red Tour's four sold-out dates at Staples Center in Los Angeles brought Swift's total number of sold-out concerts at this arena to 11, making her the female artist with the most sold-out shows there. Swift also became the first female artist in 20 years to tour Australian stadiums since Madonna with the Girlie Show in 1993 and the first female artist to sell out Allianz Stadium in Sydney since it opened in 1988.

Box office data for the Red Tour were reported by Billboard and Pollstar. In Billboard's mid-year report of "Top 25 Tours" published in July 2013, the Red Tour garnered $38.9 million in revenue from 29 shows. According to Pollstar's mid-year statistics as of July 2013, the tour earned $58.5 million from 37 shows. By the end of 2013, the Red Tour ranked seventh in Billboard's report for the top global tours of the year, reaching $115.4 million from 66 sold-out dates; Pollstar reported $112.7 million from 1,335,308 tickets sold. After the Australasian leg concluded, the Red Tour grossed $131 million from 1,481,900 concertgoers, 73 shows, and 52 cities, becoming 2013's eighth-highest-grossing global tour and highest-grossing North American tour. According to Billboard, Swift earned nearly $30 million in 2013, from touring in the US alone.

Upon its conclusion, Billboard reported that the Red Tour grossed $150.2 million from 1,702,933 tickets sold. It surpassed the record of $141 million set by Tim McGraw and Faith Hill's Soul2Soul II Tour (2006–2007) to become the highest-grossing tour of all time by a country artist. The Red Tour registered several venue records. Its 21 shows from 13 different venues were included in Pollstar's 2013 year-end ranking of the 200 highest nightly concert grosses in North America. Billboard highlighted the shows in Foxborough ($9.4 million, 110,712 tickets), London ($5.8 million, 74,740 tickets), Fargo ($1.7 million, 21,073 tickets), Shanghai ($1.8 million, 12,793 tickets), and Pittsburgh ($4.7 million, 56,047 tickets) as among the most lucrative of the tour, while Pollstar also highlighted the show in Melbourne ($4.6 million, 47,257 tickets).

== Critical reception ==
The Red Tour received generally positive reviews, with particular praise for the stage presence and emotional connection that Swift brought to her audience. Rolling Stone's Rob Sheffield complimented the various emotions that she portrayed through her songs "with so much wit and empathy" and hailed her stage persona as a "true arena-rock goddess at an amazing peak". Eric Sundermann from The Village Voice remarked that Swift was in total control of the room and that her intermittent speeches about her life lessons to the audience were a testament to her "endless appealing nature as a performer". Lydia Jenkin of The New Zealand Herald was impressed by Swift's noticeable passion for performing that kept "the entire crowd on their feet right from the top". Jordan Kretchmer of The Guardian gave the Sydney show four stars out of five; he said that although Swift's "folksy chat" with her young female fans "would be easy to [be mocked at]", it was targeted at the right audience. Also from The Guardian, Rebecca Nicholson gave the first London show a five-star rating. She described Swift as a "consummate crowd pleaser" and a "professional big sister", highlighting her interactions with fans in the crowd.

There were also compliments for the production elements, with multiple comparisons to Broadway productions. In The New York Times, Jon Caramanica contended that although the album Red was a "distracting" record musically, it translated into "a king-size spectacle" with visual and theatrical power. Several commentators, including Kretchmer, Jenkin, and Owen R. Smith of The Seattle Times contended that the Red Tour showcased Swift's evolving status from a country musician to a pop star. Mike Ross of the Edmonton Sun and Ben Walsh from The Independent both commented that Swift's charisma and steady command of the stage helped her navigate the multiple production elements with ease, while Philippa Hawker of The Sydney Morning Herald wrote that some "rambling, inconsequential, even sentimental" moments all contributed to Swift's every-girl appeal.

In a profile for New York, Jody Rosen commented that the Red Tour had "all the trappings of a stadium-pop blockbuster" but "the heart of a Taylor Swift show is intimacy". For The Globe and Mail's J.D. Considine, while the visual spectacles of the Red Tour were impressive, Swift's songcraft and emphasis on the emotions of her songs were even more so. Billboard's Chris Payne thought that Swift "struck a comfortable balance" by only using simple choreography for certain numbers, and he highlighted the acoustic segment as the most well-received from the crowd. In congruence, Craig S. Semon of the Telegram & Gazette wrote that Swift's acoustic numbers on guitar alone "proved she could captivate a crowd without elaborate dance sequences, special-effects and razzle-dazzle". Digital Spy's Emma Dibdin considered the tour a success because it "capitalises on exactly what makes Swift such a powerful figure for her audience, the sincere blend of aspirational and relatable". Nicholson added that Swift's performances where she played instruments reminded the "quality of the songcraft".

There were not as welcoming reviews, some having conflicting opinions on Swift's live vocals. Caramanica thought that her singing became stronger and sturdier than in the past, and Ross considered her voice "sweet and powerful" and appreciated that there was no lip syncing. On a less positive side, Alice Vincent of The Daily Telegraph found Swift's voice "shaky" during some numbers. Marc Hirsh of The Boston Globe thought that Swift's volume was inconsistent throughout the show and she sometimes sounded as if she were struggling even if her voice was in the right pitch. Rebecca Ford of The Hollywood Reporter thought that some songs were distracting and Swift's voice "has a habit of faltering or being too soft to hear over the band" despite having become stronger than in the past. For Randall Roberts of the Los Angeles Times, the show was a "well-choreographed mega-production" with seamless transitions "spun with the consistent beauty of a ballet dancer in full pirouette". However, Roberts thought that the show was too calculated that Swift sometimes seemed "more a symbol than human".

== Accolades ==
The Sydney Morning Herald ranked Swift's Red Tour concert in Brisbane as one of the city's top 10 music moments of 2013. Caramanica selected the March 27, 2013, concert in Newark as one of the year's most memorable. At the 2013 Billboard Live Music Awards, the Red Tour won Top Package.

Organization	Year	Award	Result	Ref.
Billboard Live Music Awards	2013	Top Package	Won	
Billboard Live Music Awards	2013	Concert Marketing and Promotion	Nominated	
MTV Europe Music Awards	2013	Best Live Act	Nominated	
Teen Choice Awards	2013	Choice Summer Tour	Nominated	

== Set list ==
The set list below is adapted from the March 28, 2013, show in Newark, New Jersey. It does not represent all shows.

1. "State of Grace"
2. "Holy Ground"
3. "Red"
4. "You Belong with Me"
5. "The Lucky One"
6. "Mean"
7. "Stay Stay Stay" (contains excerpts from "Ho Hey")
8. "22"
9. Surprise song
10. "Everything Has Changed" (with Ed Sheeran)
11. "Begin Again"
12. "Sparks Fly"
13. "I Knew You Were Trouble"
14. "All Too Well"
15. "Love Story"
16. "Treacherous"
17. "We Are Never Ever Getting Back Together"

=== Surprise songs ===
The following songs were performed by Swift as a "surprise song":

- "White Horse": During the second show in Omaha and the first show in Edmonton
- "Should've Said No": During the first shows in St. Louis and Foxborough, and the show in East Rutherford
- "Cold as You": During the second show in St. Louis
- "Tim McGraw": During the first show in Toronto
- "Forever & Always": During the show in Columbia
- "Starlight": During the first show in Newark
- "The Story of Us": During the second show in Newark
- "You're Not Sorry": During the third show in Newark
- "Today Was a Fairytale": During the show in Miami
- "Our Song": During the second shows in Orlando and Kansas City; the shows in Columbus, Arlington, Salt Lake City Pittsburgh, and the first show in Nashville
- "Fifteen": During the second shows Los Angeles and London; and the shows in Jakarta and San Diego;
- "The Best Day": During the show in Cleveland
- "Mine": During the shows in Indianapolis and Tokyo
- "Ours": During the show in Detroit and the first show in Los Angeles
- "Enchanted": During the shows in Denver, Portland and Kuala Lumpur, and the third show in Los Angeles
- "Never Grow Up": During the first show in Washington
- "Fearless": During the shows in Houston, Chicago, and Manila; and the first and fourth shows in London
- "Safe & Sound": During the show in Austin and the first show in Philadelphia
- "Haunted": During the first show in Glendale
- "Long Live": During the show in Vancouver
- "I Almost Do": During the first show in Omaha
- "Hey Stephen": During the show in Tulsa
- "Tell Me Why": During the first show in Saint Paul
- "Sad Beautiful Tragic": During the third show in Nashville
- "Last Kiss": During the show in Charlottesville
- "Teardrops on My Guitar": During the show in Winnipeg, San Antonio and the second show in Singapore

=== Special guests ===
Swift surprised fans throughout the tour with special guests, with whom she performed a duet.

- March 19, 2013 – St. Louis: "Hey Porsche" with Nelly
- March 28, 2013 – Newark: "Everybody Talks" with Tyler Glenn of Neon Trees
- March 29, 2013 – Newark: "Drive By" with Pat Monahan of Train
- April 19, 2013 – Atlanta: "Both of Us" with B.o.B
- July 13, 2013 – East Rutherford: "My Songs Know What You Did in the Dark (Light Em Up)" with Patrick Stump of Fall Out Boy
- July 27, 2013 – Foxborough: "You're So Vain" with Carly Simon
- August 19, 2013 – Los Angeles: "Want U Back" with Cher Lloyd and "Brave" with Sara Bareilles
- August 20, 2013 – Los Angeles: "Closer" with Tegan and Sara
- August 23, 2013 – Los Angeles: "Anything Could Happen" with Ellie Goulding
- August 24, 2013 – Los Angeles: "Jenny from the Block" with Jennifer Lopez
- August 27, 2013 – Sacramento: "The Last Time" with Gary Lightbody of Snow Patrol
- September 19, 2013 – Nashville: "I Don't Want This Night to End" with Luke Bryan
- September 20, 2013 – Nashville: "What Hurts the Most" with Rascal Flatts
- September 21, 2013 – Nashville: "I Want Crazy" with Hunter Hayes
- February 1, 2014 – London: "Lego House" with Ed Sheeran
- February 2, 2014 – London: "Money on My Mind" with Sam Smith
- February 4, 2014 – London: "Breakeven" with Danny O'Donoghue of The Script
- February 7, 2014 – Berlin: "I See Fire" with Ed Sheeran
- February 10, 2014 – London: "Next to Me" with Emeli Sandé
- February 11, 2014 – London: "Burn" with Ellie Goulding

== Tour dates ==
List of 2013 concerts
Date (2013)	City	Country	Venue	Opening act	Attendance	Revenue
March 13	Omaha	United States	CenturyLink Center Omaha	Ed Sheeran; Brett Eldredge	27,877 / 27,877	$2,243,164
March 14	Omaha	United States	CenturyLink Center Omaha	Ed Sheeran; Brett Eldredge	27,877 / 27,877	$2,243,164
March 18	St. Louis	United States	Scottrade Center	Ed Sheeran; Brett Eldredge	28,582 / 28,582	$2,346,203
March 19	St. Louis	United States	Scottrade Center	Ed Sheeran; Brett Eldredge	28,582 / 28,582	$2,346,203
March 22	Charlotte	United States	Time Warner Cable Arena	Ed Sheeran; Brett Eldredge	14,686 / 14,686	$1,162,733
March 23	Columbia	United States	Colonial Life Arena	Ed Sheeran; Brett Eldredge	12,490 / 12,490	$996,114
March 27	Newark (Note: Labelled as New York City in promotional material)	United States	Prudential Center	Ed Sheeran; Jana Kramer	38,065 / 38,065	$3,565,317
March 28	Newark	United States	Prudential Center	Ed Sheeran; Jana Kramer	38,065 / 38,065	$3,565,317
March 29	Newark	United States	Prudential Center	Ed Sheeran; Jana Kramer	38,065 / 38,065	$3,565,317
April 10	Miami	United States	American Airlines Arena	Ed Sheeran; Brett Eldredge	12,808 / 12,808	$1,010,175
April 11	Orlando	United States	Amway Center	Ed Sheeran; Brett Eldredge	25,617 / 25,617	$2,054,128
April 12	Orlando	United States	Amway Center	Ed Sheeran; Brett Eldredge	25,617 / 25,617	$2,054,128
April 18	Atlanta	United States	Philips Arena	Ed Sheeran; Brett Eldredge	25,471 / 25,471	$2,048,023
April 19	Atlanta	United States	Philips Arena	Ed Sheeran; Brett Eldredge	25,471 / 25,471	$2,048,023
April 20	Tampa	United States	Tampa Bay Times Forum	Ed Sheeran; Brett Eldredge	14,080 / 14,080	$1,132,095
April 25	Cleveland	United States	Quicken Loans Arena	Ed Sheeran; Brett Eldredge	15,336 / 15,336	$1,247,605
April 26	Indianapolis	United States	Bankers Life Fieldhouse	Ed Sheeran; Brett Eldredge	13,573 / 13,573	$1,082,042
April 27	Lexington	United States	Rupp Arena	Ed Sheeran; Brett Eldredge	17,003 / 17,003	$1,342,699
May 4	Detroit	United States	Ford Field	Ed Sheeran; Austin Mahone; Brett Eldredge	48,265 / 48,265	$3,969,059
May 7	Louisville	United States	KFC Yum! Center	Ed Sheeran; Florida Georgia Line	15,135 / 15,135	$1,246,491
May 8	Columbus	United States	Nationwide Arena	Ed Sheeran; Florida Georgia Line	14,267 / 14,267	$1,155,170
May 11	Washington, D.C.	United States	Verizon Center	Ed Sheeran; Brett Eldredge	27,619 / 27,619	$2,489,205
May 12	Washington, D.C.	United States	Verizon Center	Ed Sheeran; Brett Eldredge	27,619 / 27,619	$2,489,205
May 16	Houston	United States	Toyota Center	Ed Sheeran; Brett Eldredge	12,467 / 12,467	$961,422
May 21	Austin	United States	Frank Erwin Center	Ed Sheeran; Florida Georgia Line	11,916 / 11,916	$935,631
May 22	San Antonio	United States	AT&T Center	Ed Sheeran; Florida Georgia Line	13,974 / 13,974	$1,105,253
May 25	Arlington (Note: Labelled as Dallas in promotional material)	United States	AT&T Stadium	Ed Sheeran; Austin Mahone; Florida Georgia Line	53,020 / 53,020	$4,589,266
May 28	Glendale (Note: Labelled as Phoenix in promotional material)	United States	Jobing.com Arena	Ed Sheeran; Joel Crouse	26,705 / 26,705	$2,239,370
May 29	Glendale	United States	Jobing.com Arena	Ed Sheeran; Joel Crouse	26,705 / 26,705	$2,239,370
June 1	Salt Lake City	United States	EnergySolutions Arena	Ed Sheeran; Joel Crouse	14,007 / 14,007	$1,139,360
June 2	Denver	United States	Pepsi Center	Ed Sheeran; Joel Crouse	13,489 / 13,489	$1,076,069
June 14	Toronto	Canada	Rogers Centre	Ed Sheeran; Austin Mahone; Joel Crouse	87,627 / 87,627	$7,863,310
June 15	Toronto	Canada	Rogers Centre	Ed Sheeran; Austin Mahone; Joel Crouse	87,627 / 87,627	$7,863,310
June 22	Winnipeg	Canada	Investors Group Field	Ed Sheeran; Austin Mahone; Joel Crouse	33,061 / 33,061	$3,175,430
June 25	Edmonton	Canada	Rexall Place	Ed Sheeran; Joel Crouse	25,663 / 25,663	$2,379,870
June 26	Edmonton	Canada	Rexall Place	Ed Sheeran; Joel Crouse	25,663 / 25,663	$2,379,870
June 29	Vancouver	Canada	BC Place Stadium	Ed Sheeran; Austin Mahone; Joel Crouse	41,142 / 41,142	$3,974,410
July 6	Pittsburgh	United States	Heinz Field	Ed Sheeran; Austin Mahone; Joel Crouse	56,047 / 56,047	$4,718,518
July 13	East Rutherford (Note: Labelled as New York City in promotional material)	United States	MetLife Stadium	Ed Sheeran; Austin Mahone; Joel Crouse	52,399 / 52,399	$4,670,011
July 19	Philadelphia	United States	Lincoln Financial Field	Ed Sheeran; Austin Mahone; Joel Crouse	101,277 / 101,277	$8,822,335
July 20	Philadelphia	United States	Lincoln Financial Field	Ed Sheeran; Austin Mahone; Joel Crouse	101,277 / 101,277	$8,822,335
July 26	Foxborough	United States	Gillette Stadium	Ed Sheeran; Austin Mahone; Joel Crouse	110,712 / 110,712	$9,464,063
July 27	Foxborough	United States	Gillette Stadium	Ed Sheeran; Austin Mahone; Joel Crouse	110,712 / 110,712	$9,464,063
August 1	Des Moines	United States	Wells Fargo Arena	Ed Sheeran; Florida Georgia Line	13,368 / 13,368	$1,075,576
August 2	Kansas City	United States	Sprint Center	Ed Sheeran; Florida Georgia Line	26,412 / 26,412	$2,093,172
August 3	Kansas City	United States	Sprint Center	Ed Sheeran; Florida Georgia Line	26,412 / 26,412	$2,093,172
August 6	Wichita	United States	Intrust Bank Arena	Ed Sheeran; Casey James	12,231 / 12,231	$983,882
August 7	Tulsa	United States	BOK Center	Ed Sheeran; Casey James	10,949 / 10,949	$868,955
August 10	Chicago	United States	Soldier Field	Ed Sheeran; Austin Mahone; Casey James	50,809 / 50,809	$4,149,148
August 15	San Diego	United States	Valley View Casino Center	Ed Sheeran; Casey James	10,872 / 10,872	$948,541
August 19	Los Angeles	United States	Staples Center	Ed Sheeran; Casey James	55,829 / 55,829	$4,734,463
August 20	Los Angeles	United States	Staples Center	Ed Sheeran; Casey James	55,829 / 55,829	$4,734,463
August 23	Los Angeles	United States	Staples Center	Ed Sheeran; Casey James	55,829 / 55,829	$4,734,463
August 24	Los Angeles	United States	Staples Center	Ed Sheeran; Casey James	55,829 / 55,829	$4,734,463
August 27	Sacramento	United States	Sleep Train Arena	Ed Sheeran; Casey James	12,795 / 12,795	$1,138,103
August 30	Portland	United States	Moda Center	Ed Sheeran; Casey James	13,952 / 13,952	$1,084,760
August 31	Tacoma (Note: Labelled as Seattle in promotional material)	United States	Tacoma Dome	Ed Sheeran; Casey James	20,348 / 20,348	$1,584,049
September 6	Fargo	United States	Fargodome	Ed Sheeran; Casey James	21,073 / 21,073	$1,661,578
September 7	Saint Paul	United States	Xcel Energy Center	Ed Sheeran; Casey James	28,920 / 28,920	$2,320,937
September 8	Saint Paul	United States	Xcel Energy Center	Ed Sheeran; Casey James	28,920 / 28,920	$2,320,937
September 12	Greensboro	United States	Greensboro Coliseum	Ed Sheeran; Casey James	13,650 / 13,650	$1,109,253
September 13	Raleigh	United States	PNC Arena	Ed Sheeran; Casey James	13,941 / 13,941	$1,088,612
September 14	Charlottesville	United States	John Paul Jones Arena	Ed Sheeran; Casey James	12,689 / 12,689	$997,216
September 19	Nashville	United States	Bridgestone Arena	Ed Sheeran; Casey James	41,292 / 41,292	$3,336,545
September 20	Nashville	United States	Bridgestone Arena	Ed Sheeran; Casey James	41,292 / 41,292	$3,336,545
September 21	Nashville	United States	Bridgestone Arena	Ed Sheeran; Casey James	41,292 / 41,292	$3,336,545
November 29	Auckland	New Zealand	Vector Arena	Neon Trees	30,799 / 30,799	$3,100,290
November 30	Auckland	New Zealand	Vector Arena	Neon Trees	30,799 / 30,799	$3,100,290
December 1	Auckland	New Zealand	Vector Arena	Neon Trees	30,799 / 30,799	$3,100,290
December 4	Sydney	Australia	Allianz Stadium	Guy Sebastian; Neon Trees	40,930 / 40,930	$4,096,060
December 7	Brisbane	Australia	Suncorp Stadium	Guy Sebastian; Neon Trees	38,907 / 38,907	$3,895,810
December 11	Perth	Australia	nib Stadium	Guy Sebastian; Neon Trees	21,827 / 21,827	$2,364,080
December 14	Melbourne	Australia	Etihad Stadium	Guy Sebastian; Neon Trees	47,257 / 47,257	$4,547,250

List of 2014 concerts
Date (2014)	City	Country	Venue	Opening acts	Attendance	Revenue
February 1	London	England	The O_{2} Arena	The Vamps	74,740 / 75,775 (Note: The score data is combined from the shows held at the O_{2} Arena on February 1, 2, 4, 10 and 11.)	$5,829,240
February 2	London	England	The O_{2} Arena	The Vamps	74,740 / 75,775	$5,829,240
February 4	London	England	The O_{2} Arena	The Vamps	74,740 / 75,775	$5,829,240
February 7	Berlin	Germany	O_{2} World	Andreas Bourani	10,350 / 10,350	$755,006
February 10	London	England	The O_{2} Arena	The Vamps		
February 11	London	England	The O_{2} Arena	The Vamps		
May 30	Shanghai	China	Mercedes-Benz Arena	—N/a	12,793 / 12,793	$1,864,934
June 1	Saitama (Note: Labelled as Tokyo in promotional material)	Japan	Saitama Super Arena	CTS	20,046 / 20,046	$1,837,147
June 4	Jakarta	Indonesia	MEIS Ancol	Nicole Zefanya	8,130 / 8,130	$1,481,473
June 6	Pasay (Note: Labelled as Manila in promotional material)	Philippines	Mall of Asia Arena	Meg Bucsit	9,775 / 9,775	$1,511,662
June 9	Singapore		Singapore Indoor Stadium	Imprompt-3	16,344 / 16,344 (Note: The score data is combined from the shows held at the Singapore Indoor Stadium on June 9 and 12.)	$2,524,080
June 11	Kuala Lumpur	Malaysia	Putra Indoor Stadium	IamNeeta	7,525 / 7,525	$998,608
June 12	Singapore		Singapore Indoor Stadium	Imprompt-3		
Total					1,701,898 / 1,702,933 (99.9%)	$150,184,971

== Cancelled show ==
List of cancelled concerts, showing date, city, country, venue, and reason for cancellation
Date (2014)	City	Country	Venue	Reason
June 9	Nonthaburi (Note: Labelled as Bangkok in promotional material)	Thailand	Impact Arena	Political unrest
