= SMG =

SMG may refer to:

== Organizations ==
- Macao Meteorological and Geophysical Bureau, Direcção dos Serviços Meteorológicos e Geofisicos
- Science Museum Group, UK
- Scottish Minorities Group, later Outright Scotland
- Seoul Metropolitan Government, a local governing body of Seoul, South Korea
- SGM Light, a Danish manufacturer of LED lighting
- SMG plc, later STV Group plc, Scotland
- SMG (property management), a defunct American company
- SMG Studio, game developer based in Sydney, Australia
- Sony Music Group, an American multinational music company
- Southall Monitoring Group
- Spaceflight Meteorology Group, US
- Starcom Mediavest Group
- Supermassive Games, game developer based in Guildford, UK
- Suzuki Motor Gujarat
- UN Senior Management Group

== Media ==
- Shanghai Media Group
- Scandinavian Music Group, a Finnish pop/rock band
- Sex Machineguns, a Japanese metal band
- Super Mario Galaxy, a video game

== Transport ==
- Santa Maria Airport (Peru), IATA code
- South Morang railway station, Melbourne
- St Margarets railway station (London), by National Rail station code
- Sumang LRT station, Singapore, by LRT station abbreviation

== Other uses ==
- Stoke Mandeville Games, a yearly recurring sports event started in 1948 in UK, that later became international and recognized as the Summer Paralympic Games every 4 years since 1976
- Santa Monica 13, a gang
- Sarah Michelle Gellar, American actress
- Sequential manual gearbox, BMW automated manual transmission
- Submachine gun
- Sister Machine Gun, American industrial rock music ensemble
- The Screen Management Services (SMG$) API in OpenVMS

== See also ==
- SMGS (disambiguation)
