= SMGS =

SMGS can refer to:

- Advanced Surface Movement Guidance and Control System or Surface Movement Guidance System
- Society for Medieval German Studies
- Agreement on the International Goods Transport by Rail (Russian: СМГС, romanized: SMGS) of the Organization for Cooperation of Railways

== See also ==
- SMG5 protein
- SMG (disambiguation)
