= Red (Taylor Swift song) =

2013 single by Taylor Swift

Single by Taylor Swift

from the album Red
- Written: September 2011
- Released: June 24, 2013
- Studio: Blackbird (Nashville)
- Genre: Country; arena rock; pop rock; roots rock; soft rock
- Length: 3:43
- Label: Big Machine
- Songwriter: Taylor Swift
- Producers: Taylor Swift; Dann Huff; Nathan Chapman

Taylor Swift singles chronology
"Highway Don't Care" (2013)	"Red" (2013)	"Everything Has Changed" (2013)

Music video
- "Red" on YouTube

"Red" is a song by the American singer-songwriter Taylor Swift and the title track of her fourth studio album, Red (2012). She wrote the song and produced it with Nathan Chapman and Dann Huff. An incorporation of country, pop, and rock styles, "Red" features acoustic banjo and guitars alongside electronic vocal processing. The lyrics are about a past, tumultuous relationship, likening conflicting emotions evoked from the breakup to various colors, such as the titular color red that symbolizes the overall intense feelings.

To promote the album Red before its release, Big Machine Records released "Red" via the iTunes Store on October 2, 2012. The song was released to US country radio on June 24, 2013, as a single. Footage from the Red Tour (2013–2014) was compiled for a music video for "Red", released on July 3, 2013. Swift's live rendition at the Country Music Association Awards, featuring Alison Krauss and Vince Gill on background vocals, was released on November 8, 2013. The song peaked within the top 30 on charts and received certifications in Australia, New Zealand, the UK, and the US. On the US Hot Country Songs chart, it peaked at number two and charted for 42 weeks, becoming Swift's longest-charting single.

When it was first released, initial critical reception was mixed: some reviews deemed the production experimental and successful in combining country and pop, but some others found it inconsistent or underwhelming. Several retrospective reviews have considered "Red" one of the more memorable songs in Swift's discography. After a 2019 dispute over the ownership of Swift's back catalog, she re-recorded the song as "Red (Taylor's Version)" for her 2021 re-recorded album Red (Taylor's Version).

== Background ==
Taylor Swift wrote her third studio album, Speak Now, entirely herself and produced it with Nathan Chapman, who had produced both of her previous albums. Released in October 2010, Speak Now expands on the country pop production of Swift's past music and incorporates rock stylings. On her fourth studio album, Red, Swift wanted to experiment with sounds other than country pop.

Swift initially continued working with Chapman in her career base of Nashville, Tennessee, until her "started wandering to all the places [she] could go" while she was writing "Red", the title track. She wrote the song while on a flight on September 7, 2011; she had finished a concert in Tacoma, Washington, and went back home to Nashville because she felt homesick. Scott Borchetta, the president of Swift's then-label Big Machine Records, overheard Chapman's production and suggested a pop-oriented sound.

Chapman and Swift attempted several times to achieve a pop sound without success. Swift asked Borchetta to recruit the Swedish producer Max Martin, whose chart-topping pop tunes had inspired Swift because of "how [they] can just land a chorus". Even though Swift went to Los Angeles to work with Martin, he did not produce the final version of "Red", which was produced by Swift, Chapman, and Dann Huff—a Nashville-based country producer. Martin produced three other songs for Red instead.

== Music and lyrics ==
"Red"
"Red" incorporates country and pop elements, and electronic vocal manipulation in the refrain.

"Red" was recorded by Steve Marcantonio and mixed by Justin Niebank at Blackbird Studio, Nashville. Musicians for the track included Chapman on acoustic guitar and percussion, Huff on the bouzouki, Tom Bukovac on electric guitar, Paul Franklin on steel guitar, Ilya Toshinskiy on ganjo, Jimmie Sloas on bass, Jonathan Yudkin on cello and fiddle, Charlie Judge on upright piano, synth, and B-3 organ, and Aaron Sterling on drums. Mike Griffith and Jason Campbell were responsible for coordinating the production.

At 3 minutes and 43 seconds, "Red" incorporates eclectic styles. Its production is driven by a four on the floor beat. The arrangement features signifiers of country music that had characterized Swift's previous songs, such as a slight twang in her vocals and acoustic instruments including banjo, guitars, and fiddles. Its pop refrain includes electronic vocal manipulation where Swift sings the title "reh-eh-eh-ed" and rock guitars and string orchestration, resulting in an upbeat and lively sound. Music critics categorized the genre as soft rock, pop rock, arena rock, and roots rock, with elements of synth-pop, dance music, dance-pop, and Eurodisco.

The lyrics are about the conflicting emotions recollected from lost romance. Swift said that the track explored a dichotomy of a relationship of hers that was simultaneously "the worst thing" and "the best thing ever". The refrains relate the different stages of this fallen relationship to different colors: the breakup itself is blue, the pining for the ex-lover is dark gray, and the passionate love itself is red. The verses explore both the positive and negative aspects of love: connecting to somebody special feels like effortlessly memorizing every lyric of a favorite song, but it can also get out of control like "driving a new Maserati down a dead end street" and "trying to change your mind once you're already flying through the free fall". Jon Dolan from Rolling Stone compared Swift's "stark-relief emotional mapping" on "Red" to the songwriting of Carole King and Joni Mitchell.

== Release ==
To promote Red, Swift premiered one album track on Good Morning America and released it onto the US iTunes Store, each week from September 24 until the album's release date of October 22, 2012, as part of a four-week release countdown. "Red" was released as the second promotional single from Red during the second countdown week, on October 2, 2012. The song was released to US country radio as a single from the album on June 24, 2013, by Big Machine Records.

In the US, "Red" debuted and peaked at number six on the Billboard Hot 100 chart dated October 11, 2012. It was Swift's 13th song to reach the top 10 on the Hot 100. On the Hot Country Songs, "Red" peaked at number two on the chart dated October 20, 2012, and was Swift's longest-charting song, spending 42 weeks. By November 2017, "Red" had sold two million digital copies in the US The single was certified double platinum by the Recording Industry Association of America (RIAA) in July 2018.

The single reached the top 30 of record charts in English-speaking countries, peaking at number five in Canada, number 14 in New Zealand, number 25 on the Irish Singles Chart, number 26 in the UK Singles Chart, and number 30 in Australia. It was certified platinum in Australia and silver in the UK "Red" peaked at lower-tier positions on charts in Japan (number 43), Spain (number 46), and Italy (number 56).

== Live performances and music video ==
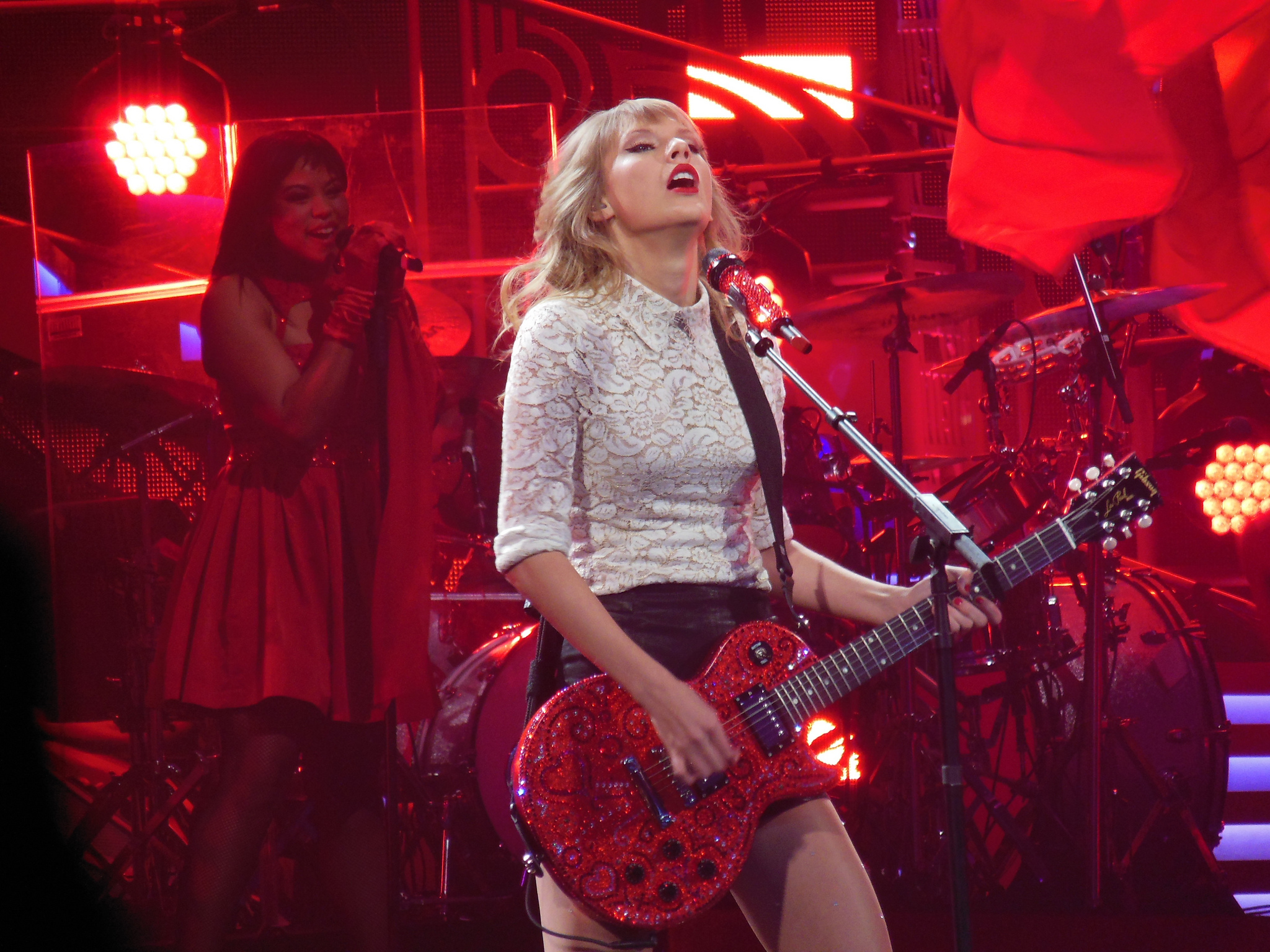
Swift performing "Red" on the Red Tour in Chicago IL in 2013. Footage of the tour was included in the song's music video.

Swift performed "Red" for the first time at BBC Radio 1's Teen Awards, held at Wembley Arena on October 7, 2012, in London. On October 15, 2012, Swift performed "Red" as part of her concert for VH1 Storytellers, held at Harvey Mudd College in Claremont, California. During the first release week of Red, Swift appeared and performed the song on television shows including Good Morning America, Late Show with David Letterman, and The Ellen DeGeneres Show. She also included the song in her performances at festivals and awards shows, including the CMA Music Festival on June 6, 2013, the 2013 CMT Music Awards, and the 2013 Country Music Association Awards (CMA). The performance at the 2013 CMA Awards on November 6, 2013, featured an acoustic version of "Red" with Alison Krauss on fiddle and Vince Gill on guitar (both on background vocals), Sam Bush on mandolin, Edgar Meyer on acoustic bass, and Eric Darken on percussion. It was released for digital download through the iTunes Store by Big Machine Records the following day.

Swift included "Red" on the set list of the Red Tour (2013–14). A music video for "Red", directed by Kenny Jackson and featuring footage from the tour, was released on July 4, 2013. It was nominated for Video of the Year and Female Video of the Year at the 2014 CMT Music Awards. During the September 17, 2015 concert of Swift's 1989 World Tour in Columbus, Ohio, she performed a stripped-down version of "Red" on an acoustic guitar. It was a "surprise song" on the set lists of Swift's later tours: these include the Reputation Stadium Tour (Pasadena, May 2018) and the Eras Tour (Foxborough, May 2023; Melbourne, February 2024). During an Eras Tour show in Liverpool on June 15, 2024, she sang the track as part of a mashup with her song "The Manuscript" (2024). Swift also performed "Red" during one-off concerts including a private concert in Paris on January 28, 2013, DirecTV's Super Saturday Night (part of a series of pre-Super Bowl concerts) in Houston on February 4, 2017, and the City of Lover concert in Paris on September 9, 2019.

== Critical reception ==
Upon its initial release, "Red" received mixed-to-positive reviews from contemporary critics. Rolling Stone provided a positive review, writing that the production effectively accompanied the "simple but effective" lyrics. Billy Dukes of Taste of Country gave "Red" a 4.5/5 rating, applauding the song for expanding Swift's musical versatility and songwriting capabilities: "[toying] with colors like a skilled artist, ... this song is her Sistine Chapel." Marc Hogan from Spin felt the lyrics were memorable, but said that the genre-spanning production made it unfocused. In a lukewarm review, Entertainment Weekly's Grady Smith wrote the lyrics "paint a rather blurry portrait" of the intense emotions Swift meant to express. Smith remarked that while the song was tolerable, the "poppy" production underwhelmed its emotional sentiments.

Reviews of "Red" in the context of Red album reviews remained mixed-to-positive. Jonathan Keefe from Slant Magazine and Randall Roberts from the Los Angeles Times commented that the underwhelming and occasionally clumsy metaphors of "Red" were subpar for Swift's lyrical abilities. Billboard appreciated the lyrical sentiments, but felt that the electronic elements might not appeal to Swift's traditional country audience. On a positive side, Jewly Hight from American Songwriter lauded the country-pop production as "sensory, synesthesia-style poetry", and Jon Dolan from Rolling Stone selected "Red" as one of the songs on the album that proved Swift's maturity as a songwriter. Jordan Sargent, in a 2017 retrospective review of Red, called the title track "perhaps the album's best pop song since Swift flirts with Fleetwood Mac".

In a review of Swift's entire catalog, Jane Song from Paste wrote: "Maybe it's not the best Red cut, but it's worth remembering." Rob Sheffield from Rolling Stone compared the pop/Eurodisco crossover to the music of Shania Twain and the "color-tripping lyric" to the songwriting of Prince, calling "Red" a representation of "this century's most ridiculously masterful megapop manifesto". At the 2014 BMI Country Awards, "Red" was one of the award-winning "Country Awards Top 50 Songs".

== Personnel ==
Adapted from the liner notes of Red

- Taylor Swift – lead vocals, backing vocals, songwriter, producer
- Nathan Chapman – producer, acoustic guitar, percussion
- Dann Huff – producer, bouzouki
- Steve Marcantonio – recording
- Seth Morton – assistant recording
- David Huff – digital editing
- Justin Niebank – mixing
- Drew Bollman – assisting mixing
- Hank Williams – mastering
- Mike Griffith – production coordinator
- Jason Campbell – production coordinator
- Tom Bukovac – electric guitar
- Paul Franklin – steel guitar
- Ilya Toshinskiy – ganjo
- Jimmie Sloas – bass
- Jonathan Yudkin – cello, fiddle
- Charlie Judge – upright piano, synth, B-3 organ
- Aaron Sterling – drums

== Charts ==
=== Weekly charts ===
Chart performance
Chart (2013–2014)	Peak position
Australia (ARIA)	30
Canada Hot 100 (Billboard)	5
Canada Country (Billboard)	17
France (SNEP)	103
Ireland (IRMA)	25
Italy (FIMI)	56
Japan Hot 100 (Billboard)	43
Japan Adult Contemporary (Billboard)	80
New Zealand (Recorded Music NZ)	14
Spain (Promusicae)	46
UK Singles (Official Charts)	26
US Billboard Hot 100	6
US Hot Country Songs (Billboard)	2
US Country Airplay (Billboard)	7

=== Year-end charts ===
2013 year-end charts
Chart (2013)	Position
US Hot Country Songs (Billboard)	44
US Country Airplay (Billboard)	43

2014 year-end chart
Chart (2014)	Position
US Country Airplay (Billboard)	99

== Certifications ==
Certifications
Region	Certification	Certified units/sales
Australia (ARIA)	2× Platinum	140,000^{‡}
Brazil (Pro-Música Brasil)	Platinum	60,000^{‡}
New Zealand (RMNZ)	Platinum	30,000^{‡}
United Kingdom (BPI)	Silver	200,000^{‡}
United States (RIAA)	2× Platinum	2,000,000^{‡}
^{‡} Sales+streaming figures based on certification alone.

== "Red (Taylor's Version)" ==
"Red (Taylor's Version)"

Song by Taylor Swift

from the album Red (Taylor's Version)
- Released: November 12, 2021
- Studio: Black Bird (Nashville); Kitty Committee (Belfast)
- Length: 3:43
- Label: Republic
- Songwriter: Taylor Swift
- Producers: Taylor Swift; Christopher Rowe

Lyric video
- "Red (Taylor's Version)" on YouTube

Swift re-recorded the track for her re-recorded album Red (Taylor's Version), which was released on November 12, 2021, through Republic Records. Prior to the album's release, Swift posted a snippet of the re-recorded track via her Instagram on October 23. Compared to the original version, "Red (Taylor's Version)" features a more refined and mellowed production.

The re-recorded track peaked within the top 10 of the singles chart in Ireland and Singapore, and top 20 Australia, Canada, Malaysia, and New Zealand. It also charted on the Billboard Global 200 at number 13.

=== Personnel ===
Adapted from the liner notes of Red (Taylor's Version)

- Taylor Swift – lead vocals, background vocals, songwriter, producer
- Christopher Rowe – producer, vocal engineer
- David Payne – recording engineer
- Dan Burns – additional engineer
- Austin Brown – assistant engineer, assistant editor
- Bryce Bordone – engineer
- Derek Garten – engineer, editor
- Serban Ghenea – mixer
- Amos Heller – bass guitar
- Jonathan Yudkin – bouzouki, strings
- Matt Billingslea – drums, percussion
- Max Bernstein – electric guitar
- Paul Sidoti – electric guitar
- Mike Meadows – Hammond B3, synthesizers
- David Cook – piano

=== Charts ===
Chart performance
Chart (2021)	Peak position
Australia (ARIA)	12
Canada (Canadian Hot 100)	12
Global 200 (Billboard)	13
Ireland (IRMA)	9
Malaysia (RIM)	13
New Zealand (Recorded Music NZ)	15
Portugal (AFP)	88
Singapore (RIAS)	4
South Africa (RISA)	78
South Korea Download (Gaon)	170
South Korea BGM (Gaon)	96
UK Singles (Official Charts)	22
US Billboard Hot 100	25
US Hot Country Songs (Billboard)	5

=== Certification ===
Certifications for Taylor's version
Region	Certification	Certified units/sales
Australia (ARIA)	Platinum	70,000^{‡}
Brazil (Pro-Música Brasil)	Gold	20,000^{‡}
New Zealand (RMNZ)	Gold	15,000^{‡}
United Kingdom (BPI)	Silver	200,000^{‡}
^{‡} Sales+streaming figures based on certification alone.
