= Holy Ground (Taylor Swift song) =

2012 song by Taylor Swift

Song by Taylor Swift

from the album Red
- Released: October 22, 2012
- Studio: Enormous (Los Angeles, California)
- Genre: Arena rock; country rock; heartland rock
- Length: 3:23
- Label: Big Machine
- Songwriter: Taylor Swift
- Producer: Jeff Bhasker

Audio video
- "Holy Ground" on YouTube

"Holy Ground (Taylor's Version)"

Song by Taylor Swift

from the album Red (Taylor's Version)
- Released: November 12, 2021
- Studio: Zumirez (Malibu, California)
- Length: 3:22
- Label: Republic
- Songwriter: Taylor Swift
- Producer: Jeff Bhasker

Lyric video
- "Holy Ground (Taylor's Version)" on YouTube

"Holy Ground" is a song written and recorded by the American singer-songwriter Taylor Swift for her fourth studio album, Red (2012). Produced by Jeff Bhasker, "Holy Ground" is an upbeat song combining arena rock, country rock, and heartland rock with insistent drums. In the lyrics, the narrator reminisces about a good moment in a failed relationship; she describes where she and the ex-lover once stood as "holy ground".

Music critics praised the lyrical maturity for its showcase of a more complicated understanding of failed relationships and departed from the bitter sentiments of Swift's previous songs. Some picked it as an album highlight and one of Swift's best songs in her discography. "Holy Ground" peaked at number 12 on the US Billboard Bubbling Under Hot 100 Singles chart and number 89 on the Canadian Hot 100.

A re-recorded version, "Holy Ground (Taylor's Version)", was released as part of Swift's re-recorded album Red (Taylor's Version) on November 12, 2021. The song peaked at number 77 on the Billboard Global 200 and entered on singles charts in Canada and the United States.

== Production ==
Taylor Swift released her third studio album, Speak Now, in October 2010. She wrote the album by herself and co-produced it with Nathan Chapman. Speak Now was similar to Swift's previous album, Fearless (2008), in its country pop production style.

On her fourth studio album, Red (2012), Swift wanted to experiment with other musical styles. To this end, she approached different producers beyond her career base in Nashville, Tennessee. One such producer was Jeff Bhasker, whose drum work on the songs by the pop-rock band Fun inspired Swift; she finished writing "Holy Ground" before meeting with Bhasker in his studio. There, Swift played the whole song on acoustic guitar, which left Bhasker impressed: "I was just blown away at how stone cold she was [...] Her style of songwriting is very, very honest. She's just a really old soul."

== Release and chart performance ==
"Holy Ground" is track number 11 on Red, which was released on October 22, 2012, by Big Machine Records. After Red was released, in the U.S., "Holy Ground" peaked at number 12 on the Billboard Bubbling Under Hot 100 Singles chart and number 37 on the Hot Country Songs in November 2012. In Canada, it peaked at number 89 on the Canadian Hot 100.

Following a dispute with Big Machine over the rights to the master recordings of Swift's first six studio albums, Swift re-recorded the whole Red album and released it as Red (Taylor's Version) under Republic Records imprint on November 12, 2021; the re-recording of "Holy Ground" is titled "Holy Ground (Taylor's Version)". Bhasker returned on the re-recording as producer. "Holy Ground (Taylor's Version)" debuted and peaked at number 76 on the US Billboard Hot 100, number 62 on the Canadian Hot 100, and number 77 on the Billboard Global 200.

== Music and lyrics ==
"Holy Ground"
"Holy Ground" is an upbeat arena rock, country rock, and heartland rock song with country pop and pop rock beats and a twangy guitar riff.

"Holy Ground" is an upbeat track that features a twangy guitar riff and constant fast-paced drum beats that, according to Brad Nelson from The Atlantic, are "insistent enough to act as punctuation for the lyrics". Rob Sheffield from Rolling Stone noted influences of 1980s music by Billy Idol on the guitar. According to Kelsey Barnes of Alternative Press, "Holy Ground" exemplifies Red's arena rock sound. The musicologist James E. Perone characterized it as country rock, with a "take on the country-pop tradition that had not really been found before in Swift's previous recordings". Other critics considered it a heartland rock track with elements of pop rock and country pop on the drum beats, which Brittany Spanos from Rolling Stone described as "jaunty but gentle". The 2021 re-recording, "Holy Ground (Taylor's Version)", features an identical production, but Swift's vocals do not feature the twang as in the 2012 version.

Swift was inspired by a past relationship with an ex-lover to write "Holy Ground". Reflecting on the incident, Swift thought, "You know what? That was good ... having that in my life." She said that the relationship that inspired the song had ended years ago, which she appreciated rather than feeling bitter about its unpleasant ending. In the lyrics, the narrator tells a past relationship that ran on "New York time". She reminisces about the early days of a blossoming romance, "Took off faster than a green light, go." There is a fleeting but exhilarating moment which makes the narrator feels that the ground on which the couple used to stand was "holy ground". According to Perone, the lyrics showcased a new side to Swift's songwriting; whereas her previous songs are mostly bitter confessions accusing ex-lovers of wrongdoings, the narrator in "Holy Ground" tells her ex-lover, "Tonight I'm gonna dance ... but I don't wanna dance, if I'm not dancing with you," with a bittersweet and melancholic atmosphere in the wake of a breakup. Nelson agreed that Swift's take on failed relationships became "charmingly complicated".

Randy Lewis from the Los Angeles Times, citing the lyric, "For the first time I had something to lose," said the song explores vulnerability and more nuanced relationship issues for Swift as an adult, transcending the adolescent perspective on her past albums. In PopMatters, Arnold Pan picked "Holy Ground" as an example of Swift's songwriting for crafting specific lyrical details setting her apart from generic lyrics found in other pop artists' music, citing the line "Spinning like a girl in a brand new dress, we had this big wide city all to ourselves" as an example.

== Critical reception ==
In reviews of Red, "Holy Ground" received critical acclaim, and many music critics picked it as an album highlight. According to Perone, "Holy Ground" is a Red track that deserves the attention of casual listeners who are not fans of Swift. He praised the lyrical maturity and found the upbeat production, though at odds with the sentimental lyrics, "somehow works" because of the pop hook. Chris Willman of The Hollywood Reporter cited "Holy Ground" as one of the album's finest tracks, and remarked that the "driving drum and rhythm guitar ... grab your attention from [the] first verse to [the] last". In Idolator's review of Red, Sam Lansky called it the "most startling" track; he highlighted the strong lyricism and dynamic production. Jonathan Keefe of Slant Magazine selected "Holy Ground" as one of Red's tracks that experiment beyond Swift's country-pop comfort zone, where "the production is creative and contemporary in ways that are in service to Swift's songwriting".

The Spectrum commended the "anthemic", rock-influenced production: "Plenty of bands try it, but it takes a 20-something former country-pop star [Swift] to pull it off." The New Zealand Herald's Scott Kara picked it as one of the strongest Red tracks: "These songs prove she's a strong enough songwriter to play it straight, while still being ambitious." Paste picked "Holy Ground" as one of the standouts on the album and described it as "hurried, yet precise, and rocking the hell out". Reviewing Red (Taylor's Version), Olivia Horn from Pitchfork selected the song as one of Swift's "great masterpieces" in her career. Spanos included "Holy Ground" among the 10 best album cuts from Swift's discography, and Sheffield in 2021 placed it among the 20 best songs out of Swift's then 237-song catalog: "Nobody does zero-to-60 emotional peel outs like our girl." Today journalist Francesca Gariano ranked "Holy Ground" second on a list of the top 10 songs by Swift of the 2010s decade, behind "All Too Well", another Red track.

On a less positive side, Mesfin Fekadu from the Associated Press deemed the song average, and Bernard Perusse from the Edmonton Journal considered it an album filler.

== Live performances ==
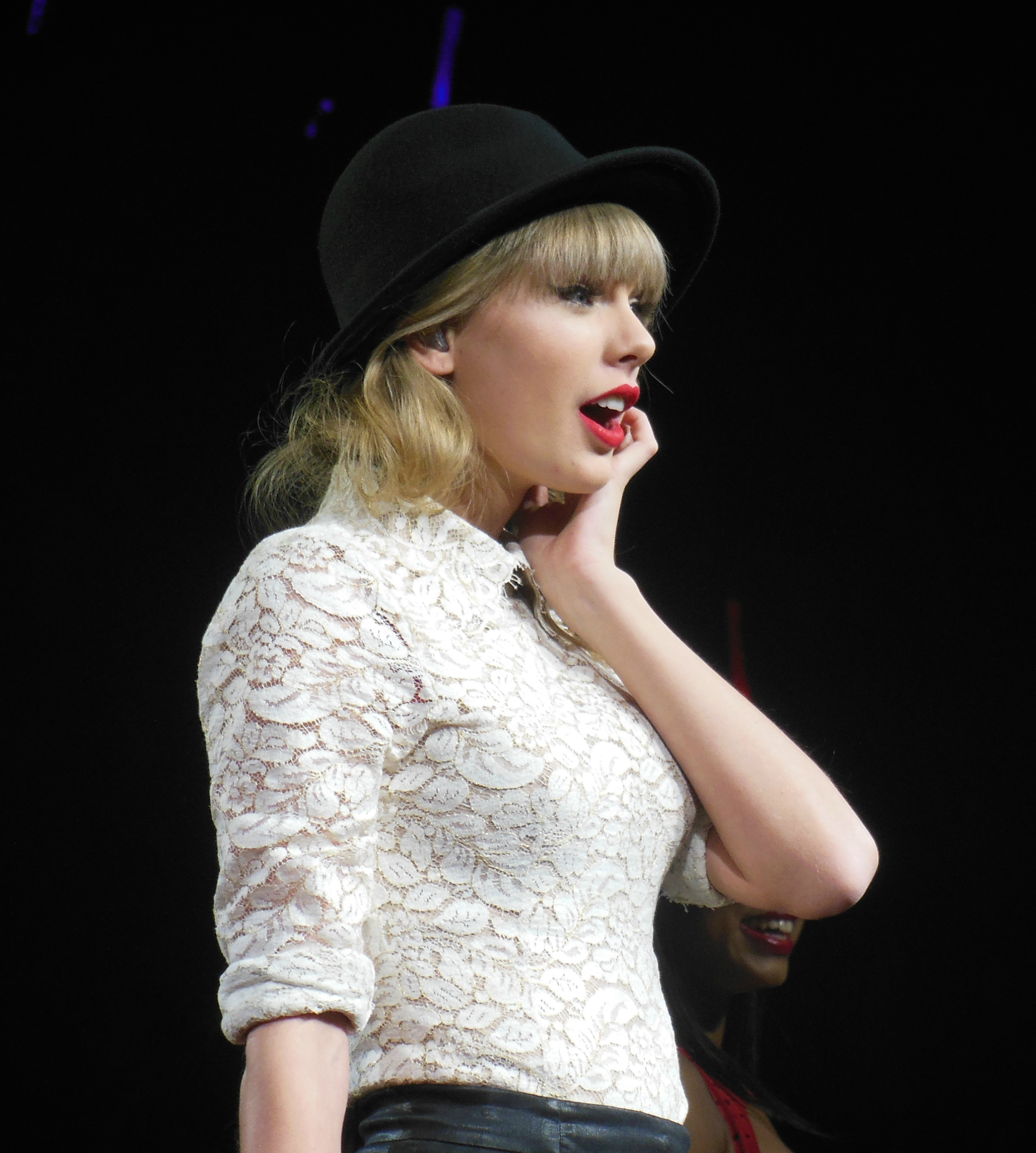
Swift performed "Holy Ground" on the Red Tour in 2013.

Swift included "Holy Ground" in the set list for the concerts on the Red Tour (2013–2014), where she sang the song in front of a New York cityscape background. At one point during the song, Swift and her dancers enact a drum solo sequence where the drums change color after every hit, before returning to the original audio to sing the bridge. The song was part of the set list for Swift's concert at the 2016 Formula One Grand Prix in Austin, Texas on October 22. At the Seattle show of her Reputation Stadium Tour on May 22, 2018, Swift performed a stripped-down version of "Holy Ground" as a "surprise song".

In September 2019, during promotion of her seventh studio album Lover, she performed a slowed, stripped-down piano version of "Holy Ground" on BBC Radio 1's Live Lounge held in New York City. Swift said the version was meant to "flip the coin of the song and show another side of it"; Rebecca Alter from Vulture remarked that the Live Lounge rendition contained a "soulful, wise ... maturity". She performed it again as a "surprise song" for three dates of her Eras Tour: the first at the May 27, 2023 show in East Rutherford, the second at the February 7, 2024 show in Tokyo and the third in a mash-up with "Sweeter than Fiction" in Amsterdam on July 6, 2024.

== Personnel ==
"Holy Ground"

- Taylor Swift – lead vocals, songwriting
- Jeff Bhasker – production, programming, bass, keyboards, piano, background vocals
- Pawel Sek – engineering
- Tyler Sam Johnson – engineering, background vocals
- John Hanes – engineering
- Tim Roberts – assistant engineering
- Serban Ghenea – mixing
- Anders Mouridsen – guitars

"Holy Ground (Taylor's Version)"

- Taylor Swift – lead vocals, background vocals, songwriter
- Jeff Bhasker – producer, Moog, Juno, background vocals
- Christopher Rowe – vocals engineer
- Ian Gold – drum programming, engineer
- Bryce Bordone – engineer
- Serban Ghenea – mixing
- Mike Meadows – acoustic guitar
- Anders Mouridsen – electric guitar
- Bebel Matsumiya – background vocals

== Charts ==
=== "Holy Ground" ===
Chart performance for "Holy Ground"
Chart (2012)	Peak position
Canada Hot 100 (Billboard)	89
US Bubbling Under Hot 100 (Billboard)	12
US Hot Country Songs (Billboard)	37
US Digital Song Sales (Billboard)	50

=== "Holy Ground (Taylor's Version)" ===
Chart performance for "Holy Ground (Taylor's Version)"
Chart (2021)	Peak position
Canada (Canadian Hot 100)	62
Global 200 (Billboard)	77
US Billboard Hot 100	76
US Hot Country Songs (Billboard)	24
