= Everything Has Changed =

2013 single by Taylor Swift featuring Ed Sheeran

Single by Taylor Swift featuring Ed Sheeran

from the album Red
- Released: July 14, 2013
- Studio: Ruby Red (Santa Monica)
- Genre: Folk-pop; adult contemporary
- Length: 4:05
- Label: Big Machine
- Songwriters: Taylor Swift; Ed Sheeran
- Producer: Butch Walker

Taylor Swift singles chronology
"Red" (2013)	"Everything Has Changed" (2013)	"The Last Time" (2013)

Ed Sheeran singles chronology
"Give Me Love" (2012)	"Everything Has Changed" (2013)	"Old School Love" (2013)

Music video
- "Everything Has Changed" on YouTube

"Everything Has Changed" is a song by the American singer-songwriter Taylor Swift featuring the English singer-songwriter Ed Sheeran from Swift's fourth studio album, Red (2012). Big Machine Records released it as the sixth single from the album on July 14, 2013. The song's music video, directed by Philip Andelman, was released on June 6, 2013. Produced by Butch Walker, "Everything Has Changed" is a guitar-led folk-pop and adult contemporary sentimental ballad. Its lyrics are about wanting to know a new lover better.

Some music critics praised Swift and Sheeran's vocal performances, while others deemed "Everything Has Changed" generally weak and generic. The track reached the top ten on the national charts of Ireland, Scotland, and the United Kingdom, and received multi-platinum certifications in Australia and the United States. Swift performed the song with Sheeran during her third concert tour, the Red Tour (2013–2014). A re-recorded version, "Everything Has Changed (Taylor's Version)", was released as part of Swift's second re-recorded album, Red (Taylor's Version), on November 12, 2021. The track peaked at number 59 on the Billboard Global 200 and charted in Canada, Singapore, and the United States.

== Production and composition ==
Taylor Swift released her third studio album, Speak Now, in October 2010. She wrote the album by herself and co-produced it with Nathan Chapman. Speak Now was similar to Swift's previous album, Fearless (2008), in its country pop production style. On her fourth studio album, Red (2012), Swift wanted to experiment with other musical styles. To this end, she approached different producers other than Chapman, beyond her career base in Nashville, Tennessee.

Swift wrote "Everything Has Changed" with Ed Sheeran on a trampoline in Swift's backyard. It was produced by Butch Walker, a prominent contemporary producer. Swift initially worked with Walker and Sheeran on separate songs, but brought "Everything Has Changed" to Walker because she "knew he would approach it from an organic place, which is where [Sheeran] comes from". She chose Walker as a new collaborator on Red because she admired his "emotionally charged" production.

"Everything Has Changed" is a midtempo ballad driven by guitar. Critics described it as a folk-pop and adult contemporary song. The track extensively uses syncopation at the sixteenth-note level, which the musicologist James E. Perone deemed a trademark style of Swift's music and reminiscent of her self-titled debut album (2006). Perone commented that "Everything Has Changed" incorporates hip-hop influences with the deep bass drum beats in its production. Lyrically, the song is about two new lovers wanting to get to know each other better. Both Swift and Sheeran provide lead vocals, alternating between the verses.

== Release and live performances ==
"Everything Has Changed" is the fourteenth track on Red, which was released on October 22, 2012, by Big Machine Records. In April 2013, Swift announced that "Everything Has Changed" would be released as a single in the United Kingdom. It was released as a single in the United Kingdom on July 14, and in the United States two days later. On June 8, 2013, Swift and Sheeran performed the song on the season finale of the seventh series of Britain's Got Talent. The two also performed the track during Swift's third concert tour, the Red Tour (2013–2014). Swift performed "Everything Has Changed" at the Eras Tour on July 22, 2023. She later played it as part of a mashup with her song "Glitch" on June 3, 2024, and with Sheeran as part of a mashup with "End Game" and "Thinking Out Loud" on August 15, 2024.

== Critical reception ==
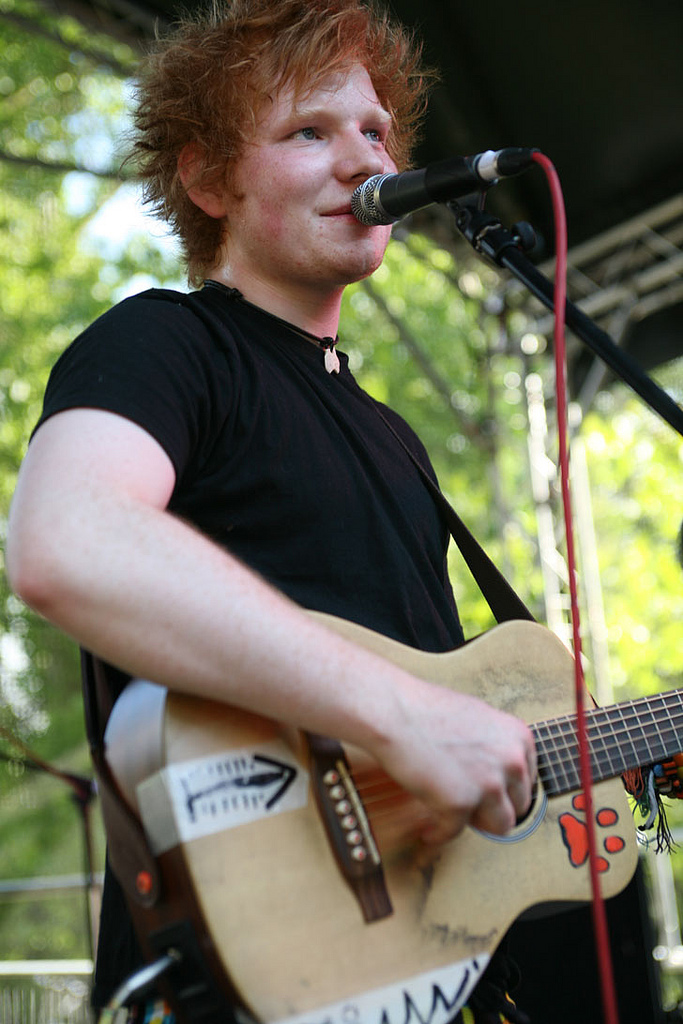
Some critics praised Ed Sheeran's performance.

Some music critics praised the composition of "Everything Has Changed", as well as Swift and Sheeran's vocal performances. Perone gave the song a positive review, calling it a pleasant track that "should not be overlooked". Mesfin Fekadu of the Associated Press considered "Everything Has Changed" a highlight on Red, praising Swift and Sheeran's falsetto vocals. In the Los Angeles Times, Randall Roberts called it a "powerful collaboration" and picked it as one of the album's "well-constructed pop songs Taylor-made for bedroom duets". Phil Gallo from Billboard considered the song "Swift at her most plaintive". Another Billboard article reviewing Red gave the song a mixed review, criticizing the lyrics as clichéd but complimenting Sheeran's harmony vocals.

Less enthusiastic reviews considered "Everything Has Changed" weak and generic. Jon Caramanica from The New York Times considered Swift's songwriting on the track not as strong as on her past songs, but still maintained "her ear for the awkward and tentative rhythms of romantic bonding". Robert Cospey of Digital Spy gave "Everything Has Changed" a three stars out of five rating; he praised the song's musical style as "cutesy" but felt that "their exchanges leave us with a warm and fuzzy feeling that is all too rare these days". Sian Rowe from NME deemed the track inferior to both singer-songwriters' respective bodies of work and "disappointing in every way". Bernard Perusse from the Edmonton Journal considered it a weak song. Tony Clayton-Lea from The Irish Times considered "Everything Has Changed" Swift's "desperate attempt" to reach out to new audiences. Also from The Irish Times, Eoin Butler gave the single a two-out-of-five rating, calling it a "typically slushy ballad".

== Commercial performance ==
In the United States, "Everything Has Changed" peaked at number 32 on the Billboard Hot 100. On Billboard's airplay charts, the track peaked at number 8 on Adult Pop Songs, number 11 on Adult Contemporary, and number 14 on Mainstream Top 40. The Recording Industry Association of America (RIAA) certified it double platinum for surpassing two million units based on sales and streaming. The track also charted in Ireland (5), Scotland (7), the United Kingdom (7), New Zealand (22), Australia (28), and Canada (28). It was certified triple platinum in Australia, as well as platinum in Brazil, New Zealand, and the United Kingdom. According to the Official Charts Company (OCC), "Everything Has Changed" is Swift's most-downloaded collaborative single in the United Kingdom, selling 373,400 downloads as of July 2021.

== Music video ==
The music video for "Everything Has Changed" was released on June 6, 2013. It was directed by Philip Andelman and filmed in Los Angeles and San Antonio. The video begins with two children who initially appear to be Swift and Sheeran when they were much younger, meeting each other on a bus to elementary school. Throughout the video, the two children engage in many activities at school together, including painting their faces with crayons, pretending to be a princess and knight, and dancing with each other in the empty school gym. At the end, Swift and Sheeran appear and are revealed to actually be the parents of their child counterparts, arriving at the school to pick them up and take them back to their respective homes.

Jason Lipshutz from Billboard labelled the music video for "Everything Has Changed" as "impossibly adorable", while Ray Rahman from Entertainment Weekly compared the video's synopsis to the film Forrest Gump (1994), but "much more gentle than that". The two actors who starred in the "Everything Has Changed" video later appeared in the music video for "The Joker and the Queen" (2022), a song by Sheeran featuring Swift. Some media publications deemed "The Joker and the Queen" a sequel to the "Everything Has Changed" video.

== Accolades ==
Year	Organization	Award/work	Result	Ref.
2014	BMI London Awards	Award Winning Songs	Won	
2014	Much Music Video Awards	International Video of the Year	Nominated	
2014	Radio Disney Music Awards	Best Musical Collaboration	Won	
2015	BMI Pop Awards	Award-Winning Songs	Won	
2015	BMI Pop Awards	Publisher of the Year	Won	

== Personnel ==
Credits are adapted from the liner notes of Red.

- Taylor Swift – songwriter, lead vocals
- Ed Sheeran – songwriter, featured vocals
- Butch Walker – producer, background vocals, guitars, drums, keyboards, percussion
- Jake Sinclair – recording, background vocals, bass guitar
- Justin Niebank – mixing
- Drew Bollman – assistant mixing
- Hank Williams – mastering
- Joann Tominaga – production coordinator
- Patrick Warren – string arrangement, composition
- Gary Lightbody – background vocals

== Charts ==
=== Weekly charts ===
Weekly chart performance for "Everything Has Changed"
Chart (2013)	Peak position
Australia (ARIA)	28
Belgium (Ultratip Bubbling Under Flanders)	8
Canada Hot 100 (Billboard)	28
Canada AC (Billboard)	37
Canada CHR/Top 40 (Billboard)	42
Canada Hot AC (Billboard)	34
Euro Digital Song Sales (Billboard)	8
Ireland (IRMA)	5
Japan Adult Contemporary (Billboard)	91
New Zealand (Recorded Music NZ)	22
Scottish Singles Sales (Official Charts)	7
UK Singles (Official Charts)	7
US Billboard Hot 100	32
US Adult Contemporary (Billboard)	11
US Adult Pop Airplay (Billboard)	8
US Pop Airplay (Billboard)	14
US Country Airplay (Billboard)	63

=== Year-end charts ===
Year-end charts for "Everything Has Changed"
Chart (2013)	Position
UK Singles (Official Charts Company)	61
US Adult Contemporary (Billboard)	44
US Adult Top 40 (Billboard)	29

Chart (2014)	Position
US Adult Contemporary (Billboard)	36

== Certifications ==
Certifications for "Everything Has Changed"
Region	Certification	Certified units/sales
Australia (ARIA)	3× Platinum	210,000^{‡}
Brazil (Pro-Música Brasil)	Platinum	60,000^{‡}
New Zealand (RMNZ)	Platinum	15,000^{*}
United Kingdom (BPI)	Platinum	600,000^{‡}
United States (RIAA)	2× Platinum	2,000,000^{‡}
^{*} Sales figures based on certification alone.^{‡} Sales+streaming figures based on certification alone.

== Release history ==
Release dates and formats for "Everything Has Changed"
Region	Date	Format	Version	Label	Ref.
United Kingdom	July 14, 2013	Contemporary hit radio	Original	Big Machine; Mercury	
United States	July 16, 2013	Contemporary hit radio	Original	Big Machine; Republic	
United States	July 23, 2013	Digital download	Remix	Big Machine	
United Kingdom	July 30, 2013	Digital download	Remix	Big Machine	

== "Everything Has Changed (Taylor's Version)" ==
"Everything Has Changed (Taylor's Version)"

Song by Taylor Swift featuring Ed Sheeran

from the album Red (Taylor's Version)
- Released: November 12, 2021
- Studio: Black Rock Ranch (Nashville); Decoy (Suffolk); Kitty Committee (Belfast)
- Length: 4:05
- Label: Republic
- Songwriters: Taylor Swift; Ed Sheeran
- Producer: Butch Walker

Lyric video
- "Everything Has Changed (Taylor's Version)" on YouTube

Swift departed from Big Machine and signed with Republic Records in November 2018. She began re-recording her first six studio albums in November 2020. The decision followed a public dispute in 2019 between her and Scooter Braun, who acquired Big Machine including the masters of her albums which the label had released. By re-recording the albums, Swift had full ownership of the new masters, which enabled her to control the licensing of her songs for commercial use and substitute the Big Machine–owned masters. The re-recording of "Everything Has Changed", subtitled "Taylor's Version", was released as part of her second re-recorded album, Red (Taylor's Version), on November 12, 2021.

On August 23, 2021, Sheeran posted a video showing him in the studio, working on the re-recorded version of "Everything Has Changed" and also recording "Run", another collaboration with Swift from Red (Taylor's Version). "Everything Has Changed (Taylor's Version)" peaked at number 59 on the Billboard Global 200, and charted in Singapore (24), Canada (51), and the United States (63).

=== Personnel ===
Credits are adapted from the liner notes of the album Red (Taylor's Version).

- Taylor Swift – songwriter, lead vocals, background vocals
- Ed Sheeran – songwriter, lead vocals, background vocals, acoustic guitar
- Butch Walker – producer, engineer, background vocals, bass, drums, guitar, keyboard, percussion
- Christopher Rowe – vocals engineer
- Robert Sellens – vocals engineer
- Bryce Bordone – engineer
- Serban Ghenea – mixer
- Gary Lightbody – background vocals

=== Charts ===
Chart performance for "Everything Has Changed (Taylor's Version)"
Chart (2021)	Peak position
Canada (Canadian Hot 100)	51
Global 200 (Billboard)	59
Singapore (RIAS)	24
UK Audio Streaming (Official Charts)	83
US Billboard Hot 100	63

=== Certifications ===
Certification for "Everything Has Changed (Taylor's Version)"
Region	Certification	Certified units/sales
Australia (ARIA)	Gold	35,000^{‡}
New Zealand (RMNZ)	Gold	15,000^{‡}
^{‡} Sales+streaming figures based on certification alone.
