= The Last Time (Taylor Swift song) =

2013 single by Taylor Swift featuring Gary Lightbody

Single by Taylor Swift featuring Gary Lightbody of Snow Patrol

from the album Red
- Released: November 4, 2013
- Studio: The Garage (Topanga Canyon); The Village Recorder (Los Angeles)
- Genre: Folk; alternative rock; power ballad; stadium rock
- Length: 4:59
- Label: Big Machine
- Songwriters: Taylor Swift; Gary Lightbody; Jacknife Lee
- Producer: Jacknife Lee

Taylor Swift singles chronology
"Everything Has Changed" (2013)	"The Last Time" (2013)	"Shake It Off" (2014)

Music video
- "The Last Time" on YouTube

"The Last Time" is a song by Taylor Swift featuring Gary Lightbody, taken from Swift's fourth studio album, Red (2012). She wrote the track with Lightbody and its producer Jacknife Lee. A power ballad, the song sees Swift's and Lightbody's characters expressing their perspectives on a failed relationship, torn between heartbreak and forgiveness. The production combines folk, alternative rock, and stadium rock over dramatic string instruments and an orchestral background in the refrain. "The Last Time" was released in the United Kingdom on November 4, 2013, as the seventh and final single from Red.

Critics praised "The Last Time" for its production and Lightbody's performance, but some felt that Lightbody's and Swift's vocals do not complement each other. Retrospectively, they considered it one of Swift's weakest songs in her discography. Commercially, the song reached the top 30 in Scotland, on the Irish Singles Chart and the UK Singles Chart. A re-recorded version, "The Last Time (Taylor's Version)", was included on Swift's re-recorded album Red (Taylor's Version), released on November 12, 2021.

== Background and release ==
Swift released her third studio album, Speak Now, in October 2010. She wrote the album by herself and co-produced it with Nathan Chapman. Speak Now was similar to Swift's previous album, Fearless (2008), in its country pop production style. On her fourth studio album, Red (2012), Swift wanted to experiment with other musical styles. To this end, she approached different producers beyond her career base in Nashville, Tennessee. Swift worked with the musician Gary Lightbody of the Irish-Scottish band Snow Patrol and the producer Jacknife Lee, admiring their sentimental music "about loss or longing". She was connected with Lightbody by their mutual friend, the English singer-songwriter Ed Sheeran, when they were recording in the studio one day. The song that Swift and Lightbody worked on together for Red is "The Last Time", which features Lightbody on guest vocals and Lee on writing and producing.

"The Last Time" was released commercially as part of the album Red, on October 22, 2012, by Big Machine Records. It was released as a single in the United Kingdom for the week of November 4, 2013, by Mercury Records. Swift and Lightbody performed the track live during the Sacramento, California, concert of Swift's Red Tour on August 27, 2013—their first time singing live together. The performance was recorded by the director Terry Richardson and released as the song's live music video on November 15, 2013. The pair performed the song once again on the tenth season of British version of The X Factor on November 3, 2013. On June 16, 2023, Swift performed "The Last Time" as a "surprise song" at the Acrisure Stadium in Pittsburgh, as part of her sixth concert tour the Eras Tour.

== Composition and lyrics ==
"The Last Time" is a power ballad. Lewis Randy of the Los Angeles Times said that it is an alternative rock song, following the musical style of Snow Patrol. Reviews from The Philippine Inquirer and The Daily Telegraph categorized the song as folk, with a relatively dark production compared to Red's upbeat tracks. The refrain is accentuated by an orchestral background consisting of strings and brass. The track ends with a strings-laden coda. The strings were arranged and conducted by Owen Pallett. Musicologist James E. Perone noted that "The Last Time" uses the '50s progression, I–vi–IV–V, which is associated with many American pop songs from the 1950s; Perone argued that this quality lent "The Last Time" a timeless feel. He further remarked that the orchestral stringed instruments are reminiscent of the music by the 1970s and early-1980s group Electric Light Orchestra.

The lyrics tell the story of a crumbling relationship, with the two narrators detailing a vicious cycle of heartbreak and forgiveness. Swift said she was inspired to write "The Last Time" by a relationship with an unreliable ex-lover, "You never know when he's going to leave, you never know when he's going to come back, but he always does come back." Swift imagined a scenario where outside a door is a boyfriend on his knees on the ground, with the girlfriend waiting inside the room, torn between allowing him to come back or not, after having been heartbroken many times. The song features both Lightbody and Swift on lead vocals; Lightbody sings of his character's perspective on the failed relationship in the first verse, followed by Swift's presentation of her character's in the second. Swift recalled, "It's a really fragile emotion you're dealing with when you want to love someone, but you don't know if it's smart to."

== Critical reception ==
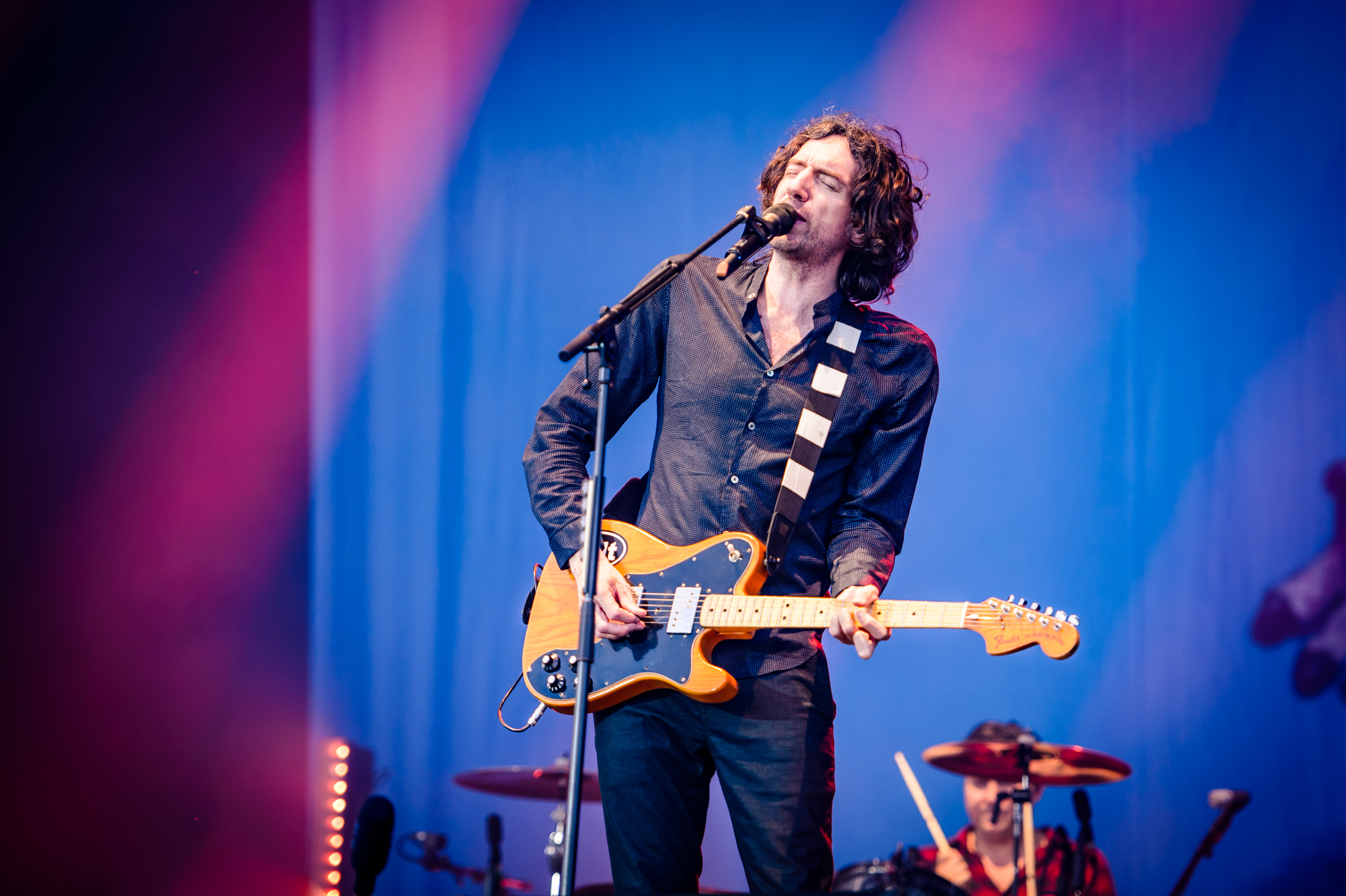
Some critics praised Gary Lightbody's vocals and performance on "The Last Time".

In album reviews of Red, some critics selected "The Last Time" as an album highlight. Joseph Atilano of The Philippine Inquirer considered it the most mature album track because it "proves [Swift] is ready for the adult-pop realm", which lends her artistic credibility. Allison Stewart from The Washington Post similarly lauded it as an album standout, opining that Lightbody's creative input helped Swift accordingly develop her artistry in experimenting with styles beyond country-pop. Sharing the same sentiment, James Lachno from The Daily Telegraph commended the production and vocals: "[The song] digs into a hidden side to [Swift's] talent." Reviews from Mesfin Fekadu of the Associated Press and Michelle Prosser of Times Record News considered "The Last Time" an album highlight, specifically thanks to Lightbody's performance. Randall Roberts of The Los Angeles Times praised the track as "well-crafted" and the refrain as "instantly hummable".

Other reviewers were less complimentary, taking issue with the duo's vocal performance. Billy Dukes of Taste of Country was more critical of the song, as he felt Lightbody dominates the track and Swift "stretches out in the back seat"; he called "The Last Time" the "only pure skip-ahead moment" on Red. Perone commented that Lightbody's vocals fit the song better than Swift's, who performs with "a sense of urgency in her singing". In a negative review, James Reed from The Boston Globe criticized the duo's singing: "his morose croon sounds dreary alongside her thin, unadorned vocals." Tony Clayton-Lea writing for The Irish Times deemed the track and "Everything Has Changed" featuring Ed Sheeran, the other collaboration effort on Red, as Swift's "desperate attempts" to reach out to new audiences, while Jonathan Keefe of Slant labeled them as "lifeless adult-contemporary fodder". Rolling Stone recalled that "The Last Time" was "wintry British mope pop" in their ranking of Red as the 31st best album of 2012.

Retrospective rankings have considered "The Last Time" one of Swift's weakest songs in her discography. Rob Sheffield of Rolling Stone, in a 2021 ranking of Swift's 237-song catalog, ranked the track at number 228; he commented that Swift's and Lightbody's vocals do not complement each other. In another 2021 ranking of Swift's 207 songs, Nate Jones from Vulture placed it at number 186 and remarked that it is Red's worst song, criticizing the production "that you've got to slog through to get to the end". Billboard placed it last on a ranking of all Swift's collaboration singles, deeming it forgettable. Alexis Petridis in The Guardian was more positive, placing "The Last Time" 29th out of 44 singles Swift released in a 2019 ranking; while saying that it is not a bad song, he commented that it is not one of Swift's most memorable singles, describing its sound as "big old post-Coldplay stadium rock balladry".

== Commercial performance ==
Upon Red's release, "The Last Time" peaked at number three on the US Billboard Bubbling Under Hot 100 Singles chart dated November 10, 2012. During the same time frame, the song charted at number 73 on the Canadian Hot 100 chart. In the United Kingdom, "The Last Time" debuted and peaked at number 25 on the UK Singles Chart for the week of November 10, 2013. The track charted in the top 20 on the singles charts in Ireland and Scotland.

== Personnel ==
Adapted from Red liner notes

=== Production ===
- Taylor Swift – lead vocals, songwriter
- Gary Lightbody – featured vocals, songwriter
- Jacknife Lee – producer, songwriter, guitar
- Mark Stent – mixer
- Matty Green – assistant mixer
- Chris Owens – assistant recording engineer
- Matt Bishop – engineer, editor
- Sam Bell – engineer
- Hank Williams – mastering

=== Musicians ===
- Owen Pallett – conductor
- Bill Rieflin – drums
- Marcia Dickstein – harp
- Jamie Muhoberac – piano
- Jeff Takiguchi – upright bass
- Simeon Pillich – upright bass
- John Krovoza – cello
- Peggy Baldwin – cello
- Richard Dodd – cello
- Brett Banducci – viola
- Lauren Chipman – viola
- Rodney Wirtz – viola
- Amy Wickman – violin
- Daphne Chen – violin
- Eric Gorfain – violin
- Gina Kronstadt – violin
- Marisa Kuney – violin
- Neli Nikolaeva – violin
- Radu Pieptea – violin
- Wes Precourt – violin

== Charts ==
Chart performance
Chart (2012–2013)	Peak position
Belgium (Ultratip Bubbling Under Flanders)	14
Canada Hot 100 (Billboard)	73
Ireland (IRMA)	15
Scottish Singles Sales (Official Charts)	20
UK Singles (Official Charts)	25
US Bubbling Under Hot 100 (Billboard)	3
US Digital Song Sales (Billboard)	37

== Certifications ==
Certifications for "The Last Time"
Region	Certification	Certified units/sales
Australia (ARIA)	Gold	35,000^{‡}
^{‡} Sales+streaming figures based on certification alone.

== "The Last Time (Taylor's Version)" ==
"The Last Time (Taylor's Version)"

Song by Taylor Swift featuring Gary Lightbody of Snow Patrol

from the album Red (Taylor's Version)
- Released: November 12, 2021
- Studio: Kitty Committee (Belfast); The Garage (Topanga Valley)
- Length: 4:59
- Label: Republic
- Songwriters: Taylor Swift; Gary Lightbody; Jacknife Lee
- Producer: Jacknife Lee

Lyric video
- "The Last Time (Taylor's Version)" on YouTube

Following a dispute with Big Machine over the rights to the master recordings of Swift's first six studio albums, Swift re-recorded the whole Red album and released it as Red (Taylor's Version) under Republic Records on November 11, 2021; the re-recording of "The Last Time" is titled "The Last Time (Taylor's Version)". Lightbody and Lee both returned on the re-recording as guest vocalist and producer, respectively. The re-recording peaked at number 53 on the Canadian Hot 100 and number 66 on the US Billboard Hot 100. On the Billboard Global 200, it peaked at number 61. In a review of Red (Taylor's Version) for USA Today, Melissa Ruggieri found "The Last Time" one of the album's most beautiful songs, praising its "hushed beauty".

=== Personnel ===
Adapted from Red (Taylor's Version) album liner notes

- Taylor Swift – lead vocals, songwriter
- Gary Lightbody – lead vocals, songwriter, guitar
- Jacknife Lee – producer, songwriter, recording engineer, programming, bass, keyboard, piano, guitar
- Matt Bishop – recording engineer, editor, drums
- Christopher Rowe – vocal engineer
- John Hanes – recording engineer
- Bryce Bordone – assistant mixer
- Serban Ghenea – mixer
- Davide Rossi – cello, viola, violin, strings arranger
- Owen Pallett – strings arranger

=== Charts ===
Chart performance
Chart (2021)	Peak position
Canada (Canadian Hot 100)	53
Global 200 (Billboard)	61
UK Audio Streaming (Official Charts)	91
US Billboard Hot 100	66

=== Certifications ===
Certifications for "The Last Time (Taylor's Version)"
Region	Certification	Certified units/sales
Australia (ARIA)	Gold	35,000^{‡}
^{‡} Sales+streaming figures based on certification alone.
