= Society for Medieval Germanic Studies =

The Society for Medieval Germanic Studies, (SMGS, pronounced 'smugs') is an academic organization for scholars working in medieval Germanic language and literature in the United States and beyond. It was founded in 1995 particularly to provide a platform for German sessions at the annual International Congress on Medieval Studies at Kalamazoo.
