= SGM Light =

Danish manufacturer of LED lighting

SGM Light A/S
- Industry: Stage, Architectural.
- Founded: Italy (1975)
- Headquarters: Aarhus, Denmark
- Key people: Gabriele Giorgi (Founder, 1975 - 2009) Mauricio Guidi (Founder, 1975 - 2009) Peter Johansen (CEO, 2009 - 2019) Torben Balmer (CFO, 2015 - 2020) Ben Díaz (Product Manager, 2014 - 2021) Finn Kallestrup (R&D Manager, 2009 - current) Ulrik Jakobsen (COO and later CEO, 2015 - current)
- Products: Intelligent lights, LED technology
- Website: www.sgmlight.com

SGM Light A/S is a Danish manufacturer of LED lighting for the concert touring, entertainment, architectural, commercial, and industrial sectors. The company is based in Aarhus, Denmark.

== History ==
SGM Technology for Lighting was founded in 1975 in Italy, by Gabriele Giorgi and Maurizio Guidi — the company name a truncation of ‘Societa Gabriele Maurizio’. In the early days they were known for producing a diverse catalogue of products for the emerging disco industry — ranging from illuminated dancefloor modules, ‘bubblesmoke’ machines and controllers — from their base in Pesaro.

In April 2009 ownership was passed by president Gabriele Giorgi and his daughter Alessandra to long-standing Italian pro audio company, RCF Group.

Peter Johansen was brought in to head up R&D in late 2010 — marking his return to the industry following a ten-year absence, after earlier setting up Martin Professional which he subsequently floated on the Copenhagen Stock Exchange.

He recruited many of his former R&D team and quickly relocated the operation to Denmark — to work on innovations for the entertainment and architectural segments.

In February 2012 Peter Johansen formed a consortium to acquire the company from the RCF Group, renaming it SGM A/S. Peter Johansen was joined by the LED specialists from his Danish R&D team led by engineer Finn Kallestrup and former members of his Martin Professional sales force as well as some of the company's Italian personnel.

With R&D, administration and after-sales based in Denmark, manufacturing initially took place at bases in Italy, Thailand, and China before being consolidated into a single, purpose-built factory in Denmark. To broaden its marketing reach, SGM has set up subsidiaries in key territories around the world, including SGM Lighting Inc based in Orlando, FL and serving the North American market, SGM Deutschland and SGM UK.

In November 2015, SGM A/S was restructured as SGM Light A/S with new ownership and new capital from an Italian company, while maintaining the management, the entire team behind the company, the product portfolio, and the distribution network.

In October 2019, Peter Johansen stepped down from his role as SGM Light's CEO. Three Executive Directors (Torben Balmer, Mikkel Falk, and Ulrik Jakobsen) managed the company until 2021, when Ulrik Jakobsen became SGM's CEO.

== Entertainment Products ==
SGM Light manufactures a wide range of IP65 or IP66 rated products for the entertainment industry. These products include moving heads, washes, strobes, blinders, and effect lighting products.

=== Product releases (luminaries) ===
- 2010. X-5 (LED White strobe) - Product Manager: Peter Johansen
- 2011. P-5 (LED RGBW wash) - Product Manager: Peter Johansen
- 2011. P-5 White (LED White wash) - Product Manager: Peter Johansen
- 2012. XC-5 (LED RGB strobe) - Product Manager: Peter Johansen
- 2012. Q-7 (LED RGBW flood strobe blinder) - Product Manager: Peter Johansen
- 2012. LB-100 (LED RGB balls) - Product Manager: Peter Johansen
- 2012. LD-5 (LED RGB dome) - Product Manager: Peter Johansen
- 2012. LT-100 / LT-200 (LED RGB tubes) - Product Manager: Peter Johansen
- 2013. Q-7 White (LED White flood strobe blinder) - Product Manager: Peter Johansen
- 2013. G-Spot (LED RGB Spot moving head) - Product Manager: Peter Johansen
- 2013. SixPack (LED RGBA batten) - Product Manager: Peter Johansen
- 2014. G-Profile (LED RGB Profile moving head) - Product Manager: Morten Kristensen
- 2014. P-2 (LED RGBW wash) - Product Manager: Morten Kristensen
- 2014. Q-2 (LED RGBW wash) - Product Manager: Morten Kristensen
- 2014. Q-2 White (LED White wash) - Product Manager: Morten Kristensen
- 2015. G-1 Beam (LED White Beam moving head) - Product Manager: Morten Kristensen
- 2015. G-1 Wash (LED RGBW Wash moving head) - Product Manager: Morten Kristensen
- 2016. G-Wash (LED RGB Wash moving head) - Product Manager: Morten Kristensen
- 2016. G-4 Wash (LED RGB Wash moving head) - Product Manager: Peter Johansen
- 2016. G-4 Wash-Beam (LED RGB Wash moving head) - Product Manager: Peter Johansen
- 2016. S-4 Fresnel (LED RGB Fresnel) - Product Manager: Peter Johansen
- 2017. G-Spot Turbo / G-Profile Turbo (LED RGB Spot moving head) - Product Manager: Peter Johansen
- 2017. G-7 Spot (LED White Spot moving head) - Product Manager: Ben Díaz
- 2017. P-6 (LED RGBW wash) - Product Manager: Ben Díaz
- 2019: G-7 BeaSt (LED White Beam moving head) - Product Manager: Ben Díaz
- 2021: Q-8 (LED RGBW wash strobe blinder) - Product Manager: Ben Díaz
- 2023: Touring VPL (Touring Video Pixel Linear)

== Architectural Products ==
Besides the entertainment focused product range, SGM Light also develops and builds IP66 rated lighting fixtures for architectural installations. These fixtures are marked POI (Permanent Outdoor Installation) and specifically developed to fulfill the requirements of installations on buildings, bridges, cruise ships, etc.

=== Product releases (luminaries) ===
- 2015. R-2 / R-2 W (LED RGB and White rail light) - Product Manager: Morten Kristensen
- 2016. I-5 / I-5 W / I-5 R / I-5 G / I-5 B / I-5 UV (LED long-throw wash) - Product Manager: Peter Johansen
- 2016. I-2 / I-2 W / I-2 R / I-2 G / I-2 B / I-2 UV (LED long-throw wash) - Product Manager: Peter Johansen
- 2016. POI series: G-Spot, G-Profile, G-Wash, P, Q, i - Product Manager: Peter Johansen
- 2017. VPL series (LED RGB linear light) - Product Manager: Ben Díaz
- 2018. G-7 Spot POI / G-Spot Turbo POI / G-Profile Turbo POI (LED moving heads) - Product Manager: Ben Díaz
- 2018: P-6 POI (LED RGBW wash) - Product Manager: Ben Díaz
- 2020: G-7 BeaSt POI (LED White Beam moving head) - Product Manager: Ben Díaz
- 2021: Q-8 POI (LED RGBW wash strobe blinder) - Product Manager: Ben Díaz
- 2021: i-6 / i-6 POI (LED RGBW long-throw wash) - Product Manager: Ben Díaz

== Industry awards ==
In October 2013 SGM won the PLASA Award for Innovation for developing the weather-resistant G-Spot LED moving head.

In April 2015 SGM won the Prolight+Sound International Press Award (pipa) for best lighting product for the Q-7 flood, blind, strobe.
