= 22 (Taylor Swift song) =

2013 single by Taylor Swift

Single by Taylor Swift

from the album Red
- Released: March 12, 2013
- Studio: MXM (Stockholm); Conway Recording (Los Angeles)
- Genre: Bubblegum pop; dance-pop; disco; rock; synth-pop
- Length: 3:52
- Label: Big Machine
- Songwriters: Taylor Swift; Max Martin; Shellback
- Producers: Max Martin; Shellback

Taylor Swift singles chronology
"I Knew You Were Trouble" (2012)	"22" (2013)	"Highway Don't Care" (2013)

Music video
- "22" on YouTube

"22" is a song by the American singer-songwriter Taylor Swift from her fourth studio album, Red (2012). It was released as the album's fourth single on March 12, 2013, by Big Machine Records. Written and produced by Swift, Max Martin, and Shellback, "22" combines pop subgenres such as bubblegum pop, dance-pop, and synth-pop with disco and 1990s rock. The track begins with an acoustic guitar riff and progresses into an upbeat refrain which incorporates pulsing synthesizers and syncopated bass drums. The lyrics celebrate being 22 years old while acknowledging the heartache that the narrator experienced in the past.

Upon Red's release, critics complimented the production of "22" as catchy but some found the lyrics weak and the song repetitive. Retrospectively, some have considered it one of Swift's best pop songs. "22" peaked at number 20 on the US Billboard Hot 100 and was certified triple platinum by the Recording Industry Association of America. It received platinum or higher certifications in Australia, Canada, and the United Kingdom, peaking in the top 10 in the UK, Israel, and South Africa. The accompanying music video was shot in Malibu, California, depicting Swift having a house party with friends. Swift included the song in the set list of the Red Tour (2013–2014) and the Eras Tour (2023–2024). She performed it live at the 2013 Billboard Music Awards.

Some media outlets dub "22" a cultural phenomenon resulting in the prominence of 22nd birthdays. A re-recorded version of the track, titled "22 (Taylor's Version)", was released as part of Swift's second re-recorded album, Red (Taylor's Version), on November 12, 2021. It peaked at number 30 on the Billboard Global 200 and entered on the charts of Australia, Canada, Portugal, Singapore, and the United States.

== Writing and production ==
Swift released her third studio album, the self-written Speak Now, in October 2010. Produced by Swift and Nathan Chapman, Speak Now expands on the country-pop production style of its predecessor, Fearless (2008). On her fourth studio album, Red (2012), Swift wanted to experiment with other musical styles. To this end, she worked with producers outside of her career base in Nashville, Tennessee, and went to Los Angeles to collaborate with the Swedish producer Max Martin. Swift cited Martin's ability to "just land a chorus" as an inspiration.

Martin and Shellback, another Swedish producer, co-wrote and co-produced three songs with Swift on Red—"22", "We Are Never Ever Getting Back Together", and "I Knew You Were Trouble"—all of which feature a pop production and programmed keyboards. Michael Ilbert and Sam Holland recorded "22" at MXM Studios in Stockholm and Conway Recording Studios in Los Angeles, with engineers John Hanes, Eric Eylands, and Tim Roberts. Şerban Ghenea mixed "22" at MixStar Studios in Virginia Beach. The instruments used on the track include acoustic guitar (Swift, Shellback), bass (Shellback), electric guitar (Shellback), and keyboards (Martin, Shellback).

Talking about the theme of "22", Swift told Billboard that the song captures how she felt about being 22 years old and the "possibilities of how you're still learning, but you know enough. [...] That brings about a carefree feeling that is sort of based on indecision and fear and at the same time letting loose". She said during a February 2013 interview with Ryan Seacrest that the song's inspiration was a group of female friends with whom she often hung out; despite the uncertainty of adulthood, "the one thing that you have is that you have each other". On March 12, 2013, Big Machine in partnership with Republic Records released "22" to US contemporary hit radio as the fourth Red single. A day later, it was released exclusively to Swift's official website as a limited-edition CD single, which was sold by itself or via an exclusive package with the Red Tour merchandise. "22" was released in the United Kingdom on March 31, 2013.

== Composition and lyrics ==
"22"
The upbeat refrain of "22" incorporates electronic vocal processing, pulsing synthesizers, and syncopated bass drums.

Music critics described "22" as a bubblegum pop, dance-pop, and synth-pop song. Rob Sheffield from Rolling Stone described the genre as disco, and Annie Zaleski in the Cleveland Scene called the track a "spunky '90s-rock gem". "22" begins with an acoustic guitar riff and incorporates an acoustic guitar-based arrangement in the verses. The upbeat refrain infuses elements of dance and electronic music; it incorporates pulsing 1980s-pop-influenced synthesizers and syncopated bass drums that evoke influences from hip hop and alternative rock. Billboard said "22" was Swift's "most blatantly 'pop' song" up to that point, and Perone commented that her vocals, processed by Martin's and Shellback's electronic production, make the track sound radically different compared to her previous songs. According to The Boot's Riane Konc, despite the pop production, "22" remains "[an] essential part of [Swift's] country years". Musically it is written in key of G major and has a tempo of 104 beats per minute. Swift's vocals span from G_{3} and D_{5}.

In the lyrics, the narrator celebrates the experience of being 22 years old, inviting friends to dress up, hang out, and "make fun of [their] exes" after having gone through a heartbreak. When she and the friends are at the party, she realizes the place has "too many cool kids" (who murmur, "‘Who's Taylor Swift anyway, ew?"). The group then decides to "ditch the whole scene". Towards the song's conclusion, the narrator dances with a man who "looks like bad news", but whom she "has to have".

Critics observed the conflicting emotions of early adulthood. Jordan Sargent of Spin said the refrain's bass has a "fleeting upward sweep" that reflects the lyrical sentiment of "feeling young and invincible" while facing the impending "doom of growing up". For Billboard, although the production is upbeat with "the most sugary hooks available", the lyrics are rather contemplative. NPR Music's J. English wrote that the contradictory feelings ("We're happy, free, confused and lonely at the same time / It's miserable and magical") serve as a mission statement for Red's depiction of a wide array of emotions, from the wide-eyed optimism on "Begin Again" to the cautionary tale of celebrity on "The Lucky One". Perone otherwise found the track to be escapist and carefree; whereas the narrators of Swift's previous songs ponder about lost love in her own headspace, the narrator of "22" hangs out at parties and gets along with a man she just met.

== Critical reception ==
Billboard's review of Red appreciated Swift's songwriting on "22" for "succinctly communicating conflicting emotion" despite the upbeat production. Digital Spy's Lewis Corner deemed the single another "pop smash" for Swift's career. Reviewers that highlighted "22" as one of the album's best tracks included Idolator's Sam Lansky, USA Today's Jerry Shriver, and the Tampa Bay Times' Max Asayesh-Brown, all of whom complimented the production. Mesfin Fekadu of the Associated Press found it better than the lead single "We Are Never Ever Getting Back Together" but deemed the lyrics weak. Some viewed the song as derivative of the chart hits by Swift's contemporaries such as Katy Perry and Kesha, including The Boston Globe's James Reed, Telegram & Gazette's Craig S. Semon, and Slant Magazine's Jonathan Keefe, who labelled it as a "shrill, deliberately vapid Ke$ha [sic] knockoff". AllMusic's Stephen Thomas Erlewine dubbed it a "cheerfully ludicrous club-filler".

At the 2015 Pop Awards held by Broadcast Music, Inc., "22" was one of the three songs (with "Everything Has Changed" and "Shake It Off") that helped Swift earn recognition as one of the "Songwriters of the Year". Retrospective reviews have been generally positive, with welcoming comments from Lansky, who highlighted the "millennial pink fizz" and "neutered naughtiness", and Sheffield, who said the song is "[approximately] 22,000 times more fun than actually being 22". Nate Jones from Vulture hailed "22" for simultaneously being "absurdly catchy" and having "enough personality", and Nick Levine from Time Out's deemed it "far smarter" than an average dance-pop song. In a 2019 ranking of Swift's 44 singles, The Guardian's Alexis Petridis placed the song at number four, and lauded its catchiness and contemplative lyrics about early adulthood. Perone nonetheless deemed "22" not as sophisticated and grounded as Swift's previous songs about heartbreak, specifically "Fifteen" (2009).

Some media publications dubbed "22" a cultural phenomenon resulting in the prominence of 22nd birthdays; according to NME's Hannah Mylrea, "Before '22' nobody cared when you celebrated your 22nd birthday [...] and somehow Swift turned it into a milestone."

== Commercial performance ==
For the week ending October 28, 2012, "22" debuted at number 44 on the US Billboard Hot 100 and number seven on Hot Digital Songs with first-week sales of 108,000 digital copies; it was the week's highest debut position. After its single release, the song peaked at number 20 on the Billboard Hot 100 and was the sixth track from Red to reach the top 20. The Recording Industry Association of America (RIAA) certified the single triple platinum, denoting three million track-equivalent units based on digital sales and streaming. In the United Kingdom, "22" peaked at number nine on the UK Singles Chart and was certified platinum by the British Phonographic Industry (BPI). The single also received sales certifications in Australia (four-times platinum), Canada (platinum), New Zealand (gold), and Japan (gold), and peaked within the top 30 in the first three countries.

== Music video and live performances ==
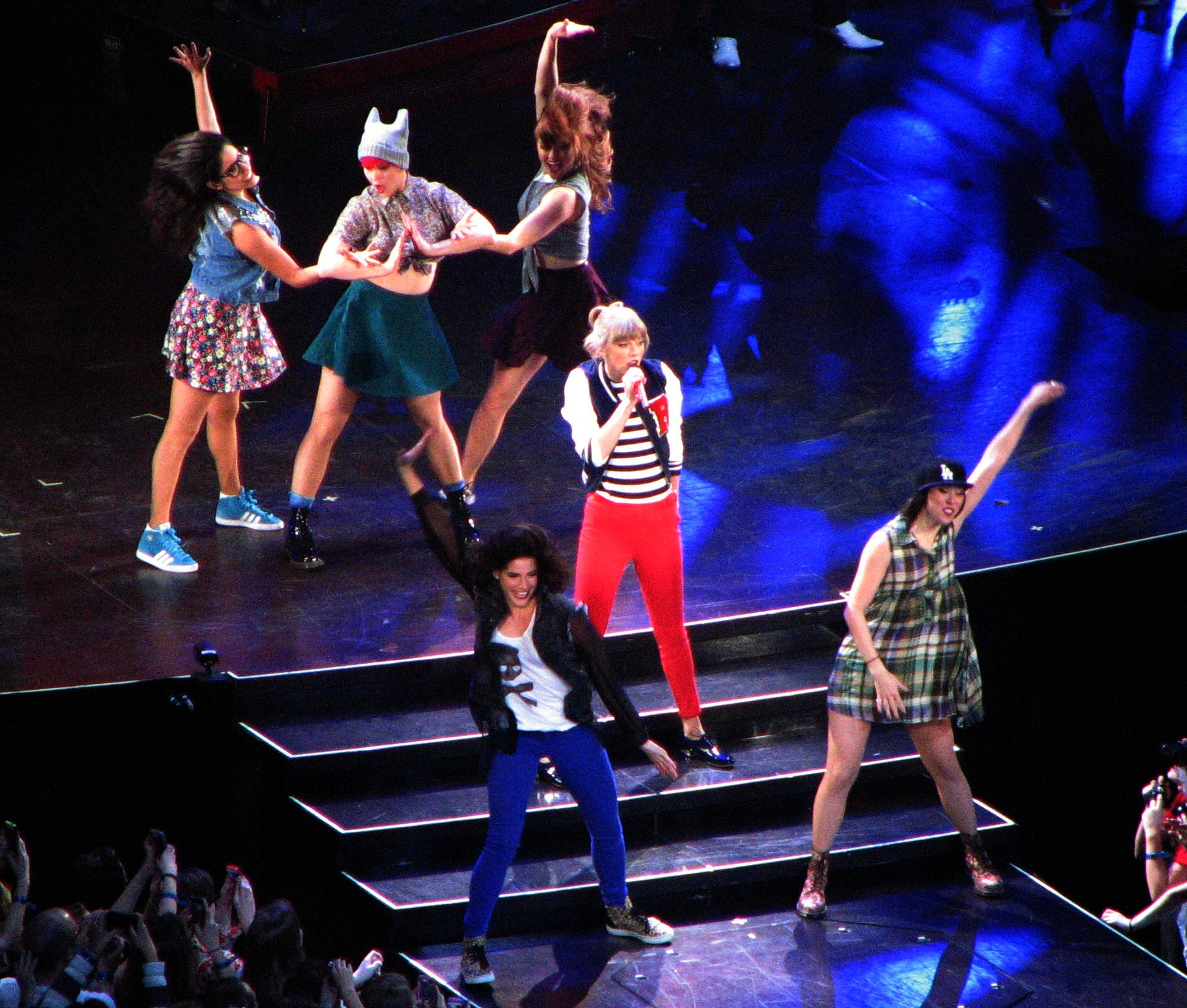
Swift performing "22" on the Red Tour (2013)

Swift travelled to Malibu, California, in February 2013, and filmed the music video for "22" there a day after she attended the 55th Annual Grammy Awards. She premiered the video on March 13, 2013, on Good Morning America. Directed by Anthony Mandler, the video for "22" departs from the narrative-driven video for Swift's previous single, "I Knew You Were Trouble"; it features scenes of Swift and her friends baking in the kitchen, sunbathing on the beach, bouncing on trampolines, and throwing a house party which ends with Swift diving into the pool, clothes on. Some media publications noticed Swift's fashion as hipster-inspired, particularly her chambray shirt and plastic glasses, while Cosmopolitan and Entertainment Weekly deemed the aesthetics reminiscent of Instagram's.

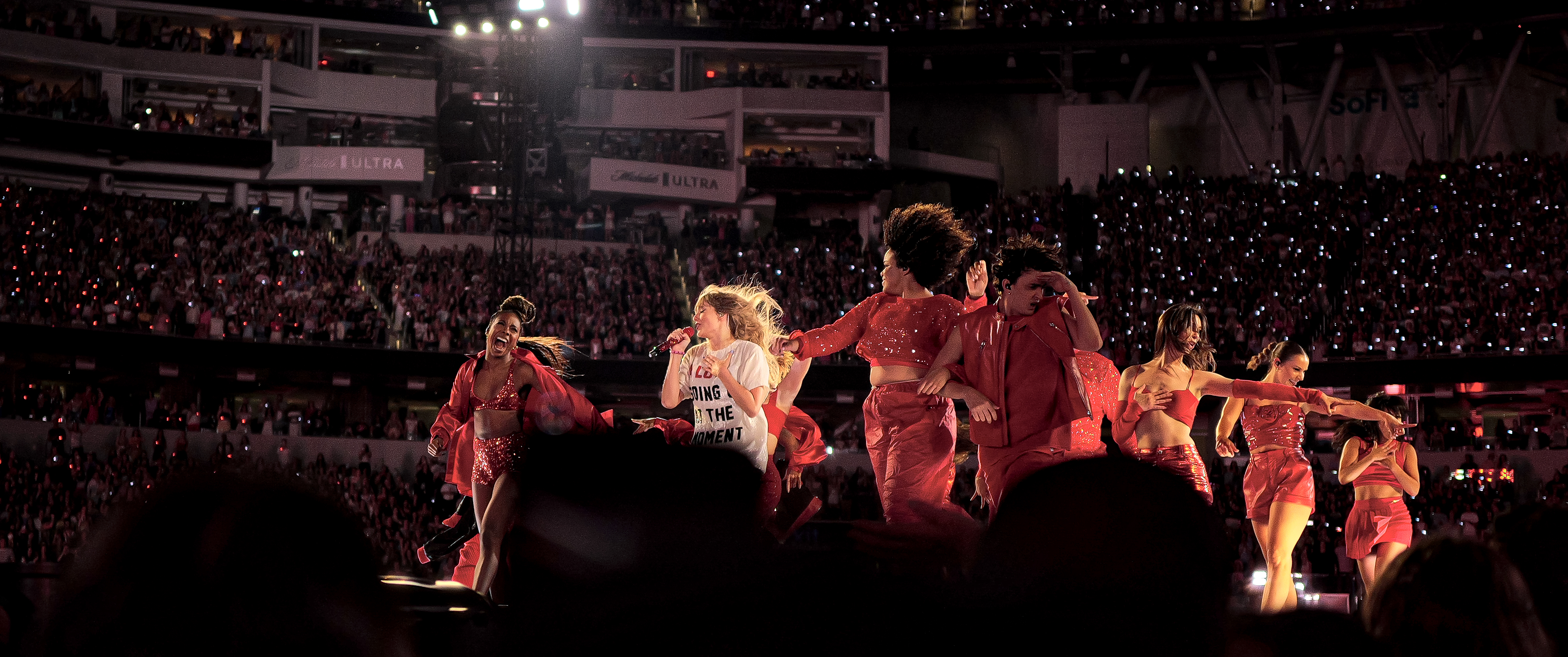
Swift performing "22" at the Eras Tour (2023)

Before the release of Red on August 13, 2012, Swift performed an acoustic rendition of "22" for her "YouTube Webchat" in Nashville. It was later included on the set list to Swift's private concert held on a péniche on the Seine on January 28, 2013. Her first televised performance of "22" was on May 19, 2013, at the 2013 Billboard Music Awards. Dressed in silver shoes, black high-waisted shorts, and a unicorn T-shirt saying "Haters Gonna Hate", Swift sang the first verse and chorus, and the second verse in the dressing room backstage. She appeared onstage for the rest of the song, joined by America's Got Talent winners and the dance crew Jabbawockeez; the performances ended with red balloons falling from the ceiling. The song was part of the set list to the Red Tour (2013–2014), where Swift performed it with a dance troupe.

Swift later included "22" as part of the set lists to her other concerts and shows, including at the iHeartRadio Music Festival in September 2014, at the Formula 1 United States Grand Prix at the Circuit of the Americas in October 2016, and at the DirecTV Super Saturday Night, as part of a series of pre-Super Bowl concerts, in February 2017. She performed "22" on the Reputation Stadium Tour (2018) as a "surprise song" for the second show in Chicago, the first show in Foxborough, and the show in Sydney. On December 8, 2019, Swift performed the song at Capital FM's Jingle Bell Ball 2019 in London. In March 2023, Swift embarked on the Eras Tour, as a tribute to her discography. The tour consisted of ten acts, including the Red set, where "22" was the opening track. Swift performs the song while wearing a version of the white T-shirt and black hat from the song's music video. Towards the end of the song, she greets a fan pre-selected from the audience and gives them the hat.

== Credits and personnel ==
Credits adapted from the liner notes of Red

- Taylor Swift – vocals, songwriter, acoustic guitar
- Max Martin – producer, songwriter, keyboards
- Shellback – producer, songwriter, acoustic guitar, electric guitar, keyboards, bass, programming
- Tom Coyne – mastering
- Eric Eylands – assistant recording
- Serban Ghenea – mixing
- John Hanes – engineer
- Sam Holland – recording
- Michael Ilbert – recording
- Tim Roberts – assistant mixing

== Charts ==
=== Weekly charts ===
Weekly chart performance for "22"
Chart (2013)	Peak position
Australia (ARIA)	21
Belgium (Ultratip Bubbling Under Flanders)	3
Belgium (Ultratip Bubbling Under Wallonia)	28
Brazil (Billboard Brasil Hot 100)	97
Brazil Hot Pop Songs	28
Canada Hot 100 (Billboard)	20
Canada CHR/Top 40 (Billboard)	16
Canada Hot AC (Billboard)	11
Czech Republic Airplay (ČNS IFPI)	100
Euro Digital Song Sales (Billboard)	18
France (SNEP)	155
Ireland (IRMA)	12
Israel International Airplay (Media Forest)	3
Japan Hot 100 (Billboard)	53
Japan Adult Contemporary (Billboard)	45
Lebanon (Lebanese Top 20)	14
Netherlands (Dutch Tipparade 40)	7
New Zealand (Recorded Music NZ)	23
Scottish Singles Sales (Official Charts)	9
Slovakia Airplay (ČNS IFPI)	36
South Africa Airplay (EMA)	4
UK Singles (Official Charts)	9
US Billboard Hot 100	20
US Adult Contemporary (Billboard)	19
US Adult Pop Airplay (Billboard)	9
US Pop Airplay (Billboard)	12

=== Year-end charts ===
Year-end chart performance for "22"
Chart (2013)	Position
Canada (Canadian Hot 100)	78
UK Singles (OCC)	76
US Billboard Hot 100	71
US Adult Pop Songs (Billboard)	48

== Certifications ==
Certifications for "22"
Region	Certification	Certified units/sales
Australia (ARIA)	4× Platinum	280,000^{‡}
Brazil (Pro-Música Brasil)	2× Platinum	120,000^{‡}
Canada (Music Canada)	Platinum	80,000^{*}
Japan (RIAJ)	Gold	100,000^{*}
New Zealand (RMNZ)	Platinum	15,000^{*}
United Kingdom (BPI)	Platinum	600,000^{‡}
United States (RIAA)	3× Platinum	3,000,000^{‡}
Streaming
Denmark (IFPI Danmark)	Gold	900,000^{†}
^{*} Sales figures based on certification alone.^{‡} Sales+streaming figures based on certification alone.^{†} Streaming-only figures based on certification alone.

== Release history ==
Release dates and formats for "22"
Country	Date	Format	Label	Ref.
United States	March 12, 2013	Contemporary hit radio	Big Machine; Republic	
United States	March 13, 2013	CD single	Big Machine	
United Kingdom	March 31, 2013	Contemporary hit radio	Big Machine; Mercury	

== "22 (Taylor's Version)" ==
"22 (Taylor's Version)"

Song by Taylor Swift

from the album Red (Taylor's Version)
- Released: November 12, 2021
- Studio: Kitty Committee (Belfast); Prime Recording (Nashville)
- Length: 3:52
- Label: Republic
- Songwriters: Taylor Swift; Max Martin; Shellback
- Producers: Taylor Swift; Shellback; Christopher Rowe

Lyric video
- "22 (Taylor's Version)" on YouTube

Swift re-recorded "22" for her second re-recorded album, Red (Taylor's Version) (2021). She posted a snippet of the re-recorded song, titled "22 (Taylor's Version)", on her Instagram on August 5, 2021. Red (Taylor's Version) was released on November 12, 2021, by Republic Records; it is part of Swift's move to claim the ownership to her master recordings after a public dispute with her former label Big Machine and the talent manager Scooter Braun.

"22 (Taylor's Version)" was produced by Swift, Shellback, and Christopher Rowe. In reviews of Red (Taylor's Version), some critics remarked that "22" was one of Swift's best pop songs, with Olivia Horn from Pitchfork deeming it one of her "great masterpieces". In Slant Magazine, Jonathan Keefe commented that though the 2012 version was indiscernible from the music of other pop stars of the era, the 2021 re-recorded version improved with a wistful tone.

Commercially, "22 (Taylor's Version)" entered the countries of Singapore (17), Australia (27), the Canadian Hot 100 (33), and Portugal (151). In the United States, the song debuted and peaked at number 52 on the Billboard Hot 100, where it extended her record of most chart entries among women. On non-national charts, the song reached number 36 on New Zealand's Hot Singles Chart and number 49 on the United Kingdom's Audio Streaming Chart. It also peaked at number 30 on the Billboard Global 200.

=== Personnel ===
Adapted from the liner notes of Red (Taylor's Version)

- Taylor Swift – lead vocals, background vocals, songwriter, producer
- Christopher Rowe – producer, lead vocals engineer
- Shellback – producer, songwriter
- Max Martin – songwriter
- Dan Burns – additional programming, additional engineer
- Matt Billingslea – drums
- Bryce Bordone – engineer
- Derek Garten – engineer, editor
- Serban Ghenea – mixer
- Max Bernstein – synths
- Mike Meadows – acoustic guitar, synths
- Amos Heller – bass guitar, bass synthesizer
- Paul Sidoti – electric guitar

=== Charts ===
Chart performance for "22 (Taylor's Version)"
Chart (2021–2022)	Peak position
Australia (ARIA)	27
Canada Hot 100 (Billboard)	33
Global 200 (Billboard)	30
New Zealand Hot Singles (RMNZ)	36
Portugal (AFP)	151
Singapore (RIAS)	17
UK Audio Streaming (Official Charts)	49
US Billboard Hot 100	52

=== Certifications ===
Certifications "22 (Taylor's Version)"
Region	Certification	Certified units/sales
Australia (ARIA)	Platinum	70,000^{‡}
Brazil (Pro-Música Brasil)	Gold	20,000^{‡}
New Zealand (RMNZ)	Gold	15,000^{‡}
United Kingdom (BPI)	Silver	200,000^{‡}
^{‡} Sales+streaming figures based on certification alone.
