= Forever Winter =

2021 song by Taylor Swift

Song by Taylor Swift

from the album Red (Taylor's Version)
- Released: November 12, 2021
- Studio: Conway (Los Angeles); Electric Lady (New York City); Rough Customer (Brooklyn); Kitty Committee (Belfast)
- Genre: Alternative; folk-pop; power pop
- Length: 4:23
- Label: Republic
- Songwriters: Taylor Swift; Mark Foster
- Producers: Taylor Swift; Jack Antonoff

Lyric video
- "Forever Winter" on YouTube

"Forever Winter" (Note: Officially titled "Forever Winter (Taylor's Version) (From the Vault)") is a song by the American singer-songwriter Taylor Swift from her second re-recorded album, Red (Taylor's Version) (2021). It was intended for but excluded from her fourth studio album, Red (2012). Swift wrote the song with Mark Foster and produced it with Jack Antonoff. "Forever Winter" is an alternative, folk-pop, and power pop track that features an upbeat arrangement, saxophone and trumpet notes, and acoustic guitar strums and arpeggios; the refrain incorporates horns, flutes, and guitars.

The lyrics depict Swift's concern for her friend's mental health challenges and suicidal tendencies, assuring him of her unwavering support. Some music critics praised the song for its production and Swift's vocal performance, while others considered the narrative ineffective. "Forever Winter" peaked at number 87 on the Billboard Global 200 and reached the national charts of Canada and the United States.

== Background and release ==
Taylor Swift departed from Big Machine Records and signed a deal with Republic Records in November 2018. She began re-recording her first six studio albums in November 2020. The decision followed a public 2019 dispute between Swift and the talent manager Scooter Braun, who had acquired Big Machine, including the master recordings of her albums which the label had released. By re-recording the albums, Swift had full ownership of the new masters, which enabled her to control the licensing of her songs for commercial use and therefore substitute the Big Machine–owned masters.

In April 2021, Swift released her first re-recorded album, Fearless (Taylor's Version), a re-recording of her second studio album, Fearless (2008); the album features several unreleased "From the Vault" tracks that she had written but left out of the original's track listing. On November 12, 2021, Swift released Red (Taylor's Version), the re-recording of her fourth studio album, Red (2012). "Forever Winter" is one of the album's vault tracks and number 27 on its track listing. It reached number 87 on the Billboard Global 200 chart dated November 27, 2021. In the United States, "Forever Winter" peaked at number 26 on the Hot Country Songs chart and number 79 on the Billboard Hot 100 chart. It reached number 64 on the Canadian Hot 100 chart. The demo version of "Forever Winter" leaked onto the internet on February 26, 2023.

== Production ==
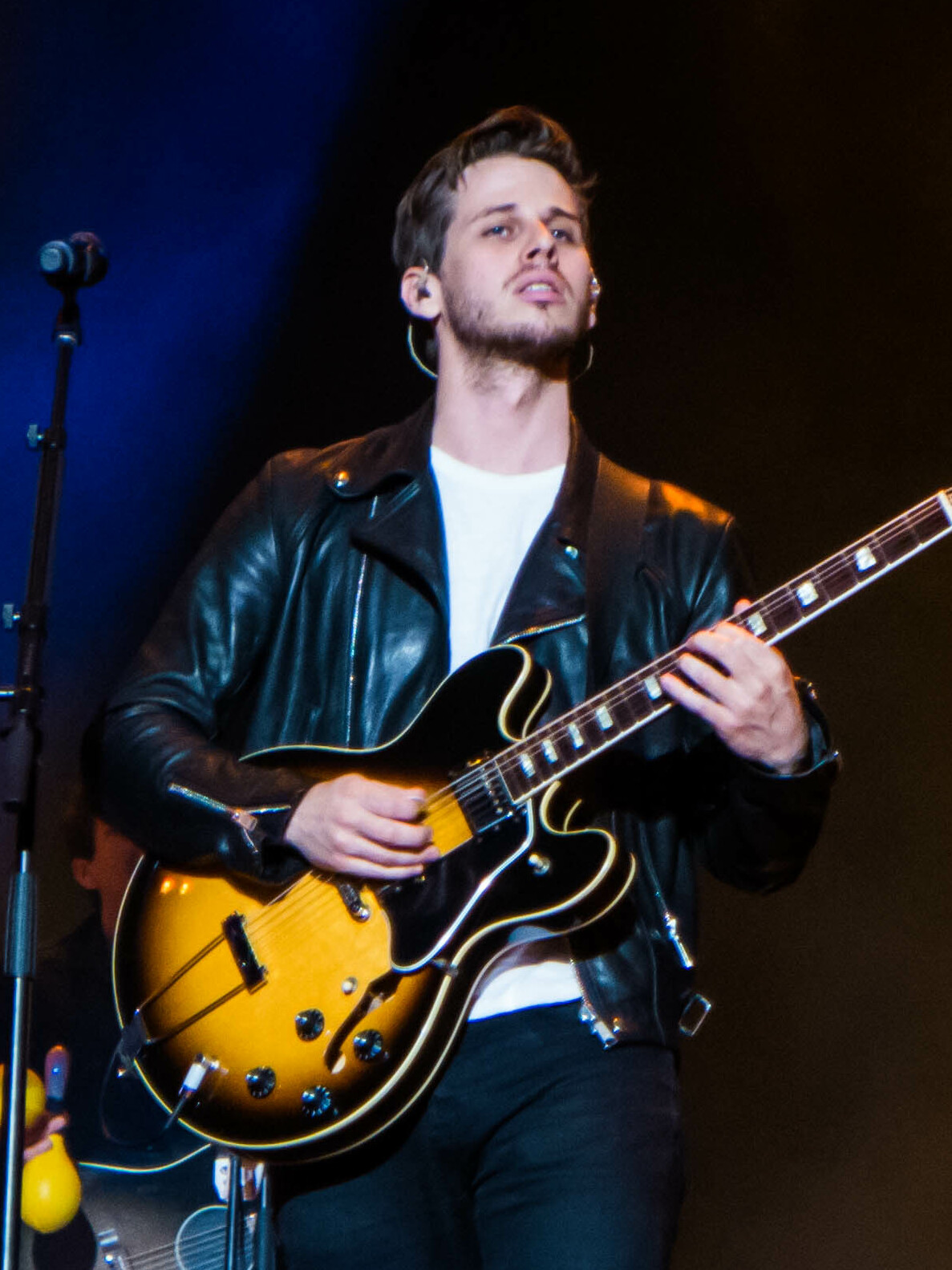
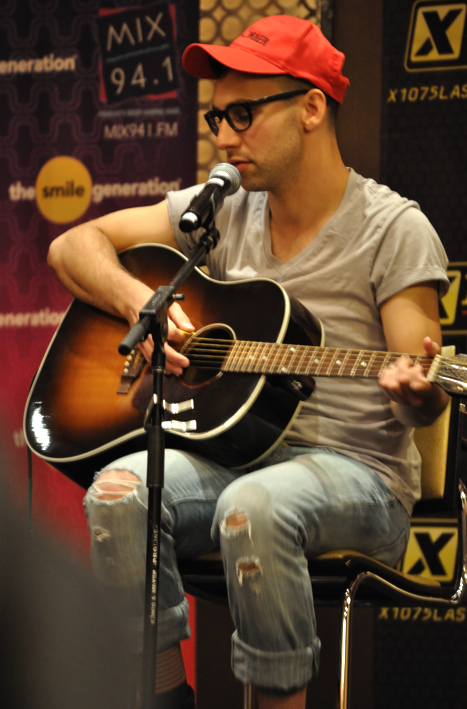
"Forever Winter" was co-written by Mark Foster (left, pictured in 2014) and co-produced by Jack Antonoff (right, 2012).

Swift wrote "Forever Winter" with Mark Foster, the lead singer of the band Foster the People. He revealed that he had written a song with Swift a few months before Red's release in 2012: "We kind of just went into it casually, like let's just jam and just have fun, and something really cool came out of it." Swift produced the track with Jack Antonoff, who recorded it with Laura Sisk at Conway Recording Studios in Los Angeles, Electric Lady Studios in New York City, and Rough Customer Studio in Brooklyn. Christopher Rowe recorded Swift's vocals at Kitty Committee Studio in Belfast. Foster additionally provided background vocals, while Antonoff played drums, guitars, keyboards, bass, percussion, and Mellotron.

The track was mixed by Serban Ghenea at MixStar Studios in Virginia Beach, Virginia; mastered by Randy Merrill at Sterling Sound Studios in Edgewater, New Jersey; and engineered for mix by Bryce Bordone. It was engineered by Antonoff, Sisk, Rooney, Evan Smith, Mikey Freedom Hart, David Hart, Sean Hutchinson, Michael Riddleberger, and Cole Kamen-Green. Musicians who played instruments include Mikey Freedom Hart (electric guitar, bass, Juno, M1, pedal steel guitar); Smith (saxophone, flute); Kamen-Green (trumpet, mellophone); Hutchinson (drums, percussion); and Riddleberger (percussion).

== Music and lyrics ==
"Forever Winter"
A sample of the refrain of "Forever Winter", featuring horns, flutes, guitars, and lyrics about Swift's support to her friend

"Forever Winter" is 4 minutes and 23 seconds long. It is an alternative, folk-pop, and power pop song opening with an energetic brass that was compared to the music of the Salvation Army church by The Independent's Helen Brown. The track transitions into the refrain that features horns, flutes, guitars, and Swift's dynamic vocals. The upbeat arrangement of "Forever Winter" incorporates acoustic guitar strums and arpeggios, layers of synthesizers, and a rhythmic pattern of snare drums on the second beat and the eighth note of the third beat. The track also features a tambourine that accentuates the fourth beat on the verses, the second and fourth beats on the refrains, and the sixteenth note on the bridge. The music critics Damien Somville and Marine Benoit found the song's production similar to that of "Babe (Taylor's Version)", a track from Red (Taylor's Version) that has the same group of musicians involved in "Forever Winter".

The lyrics find Swift's narrator trying to help a friend through his depression and mental health challenges. She worries that he might be contemplating suicide, although his thoughts during their phone conversations seem less suicidal than they truly are. The narrator conveys the significance of her friend in her life and assures him of her unwavering support ("I'll be summer sun for you forever / Forever winter if you go"). In the song's original demo version, the narrator hints that she had feelings for her friend in the final line ("He says, 'Why fall in love' / I say, 'Cause I won't go away'"). Swift ultimately changed the lyric in the studio version ("He says he doesn't believe anything much he hears these days / I say, 'Believe in one thing, I won't go away'"). Some music journalists found "Forever Winter" thematically similar to Swift's single "Renegade" (2021). Somville and Benoit thought that the song's shimmering, upbeat production emphasized the idea of having hope in the face of despair.

== Critical reception ==
Critics praised "Forever Winter" for its production and Swift's vocal performance. Variety's Chris Willman lauded the track for its cheerful rhythm, mature concept, and "bittersweet" trumpet notes and saxophone embellishments, and Vulture's Nate Jones believed that Swift's feelings resonated authentically in "Forever Winter". Time's Samantha Cooney similarly complimented the trumpet notes and how "you can hear the emotions in Swift's voice". Josh Kurp of Uproxx thought that her "voice cracks" during the refrain contributed depth to the song. Billboard's Jason Lipshutz commended the track for its complex production and Swift's subtle and diverse vocals; he considered it the album's eighth-best vault track. Lauren McCarthy from Nylon wrote: "It's a testament to both Swift's songwriting and vocals that the song is [...] one of her rawest and heart-wrenching."

In a less enthusiastic review, Business Insider's Callie Ahlgrim felt "Forever Winter" did not possess the "gut-punch revelations or keen-eyed observations" found in "Renegade" and criticized how it portrayed the narrator as a "kind of happiness tool at a man's disposal". Courteney Larocca from the same publication took issue with the narrator's perspective of viewing her friend as an issue to be resolved, but appreciated the refrain in which the narrator addresses him directly. They both placed the song last in their ranking of the album's vault tracks. "Forever Winter" appeared in 2023 rankings of Swift's vault tracks by Nylon's McCarthy and Steffanee Wang (6 out of 21), Kurp (15 out of 26), Willman (19 out of 25), and Lipshutz (23 out of 26), and 2024 rankings of her discography by Jones (120 out of 245) and Rolling Stone's Rob Sheffield (168 out of 274).

== Personnel ==
Credits are adapted from the liner notes of Red (Taylor's Version).

- Taylor Swift – lead vocals, songwriter, producer
- Mark Foster – background vocals, songwriter
- Jack Antonoff – producer, engineer, recording engineer, programmer, drums, percussion, bass, acoustic guitar, electric guitar, 12-string acoustic guitar, Mellotron, keyboards
- Christopher Rowe – vocal recording engineer
- Laura Sisk – engineer, recording engineer
- Jon Sher – assistant recording engineer
- John Rooney – engineer, assistant recording engineer
- Lauren Marquez – assistant recording engineer
- Evan Smith – engineer, saxophone, flute
- Mikey Freedom Hart – engineer, electric guitar, bass, Juno, M1, pedal steel guitar
- David Hart – engineer
- Sean Hutchinson – engineer, drums, percussion
- Michael Riddleberger – engineer, percussion
- Cole Kamen-Green – engineer, trumpet, mellophone
- Serban Ghenea – mixer
- Bryce Bordone – engineer for mix
- Randy Merrill – mastering engineer

== Charts ==
Chart performance for "Forever Winter"
Chart (2023)	Peak position
Canada Hot 100 (Billboard)	64
Global 200 (Billboard)	87
US Billboard Hot 100	79
US Hot Country Songs (Billboard)	26
