= Nothing New (song) =

2021 song by Taylor Swift featuring Phoebe Bridgers

Song by Taylor Swift featuring Phoebe Bridgers

from the album Red (Taylor's Version)
- Written: March 2012
- Released: November 12, 2021
- Studio: Kitty Committee (Belfast); Long Pond (New York); Sound City (Van Nuys)
- Genre: Alternative rock; folk
- Length: 4:18
- Label: Republic
- Songwriter: Taylor Swift
- Producers: Taylor Swift; Aaron Dessner

Lyric video
- "Nothing New" on YouTube

"Nothing New" (Note: Subtitled "(Taylor's Version) (from the Vault)") is a song by the American singer-songwriters Taylor Swift featuring Phoebe Bridgers. Swift wrote the song in March 2012 and produced it with Aaron Dessner for her second re-recorded studio album, Red (Taylor's Version), which was released in 2021 through Republic Records. The track is a guitar-led folk and alternative rock tune about anxieties over romance and growing up.

Critics interpreted "Nothing New" as Swift's message about the music industry's treatment of female musicians. They lauded the song's emotional sentiments, Swift's songwriting, and Bridgers's performance. After Red (Taylor's Version) was released, the track peaked at number 43 on the US Billboard Hot 100 and the top 40 on national charts in Australia, Canada, and Ireland. "Nothing New" was included on the set list of Swift's the Eras Tour at concerts opened by Bridgers, who performed the song with her.

== Background ==
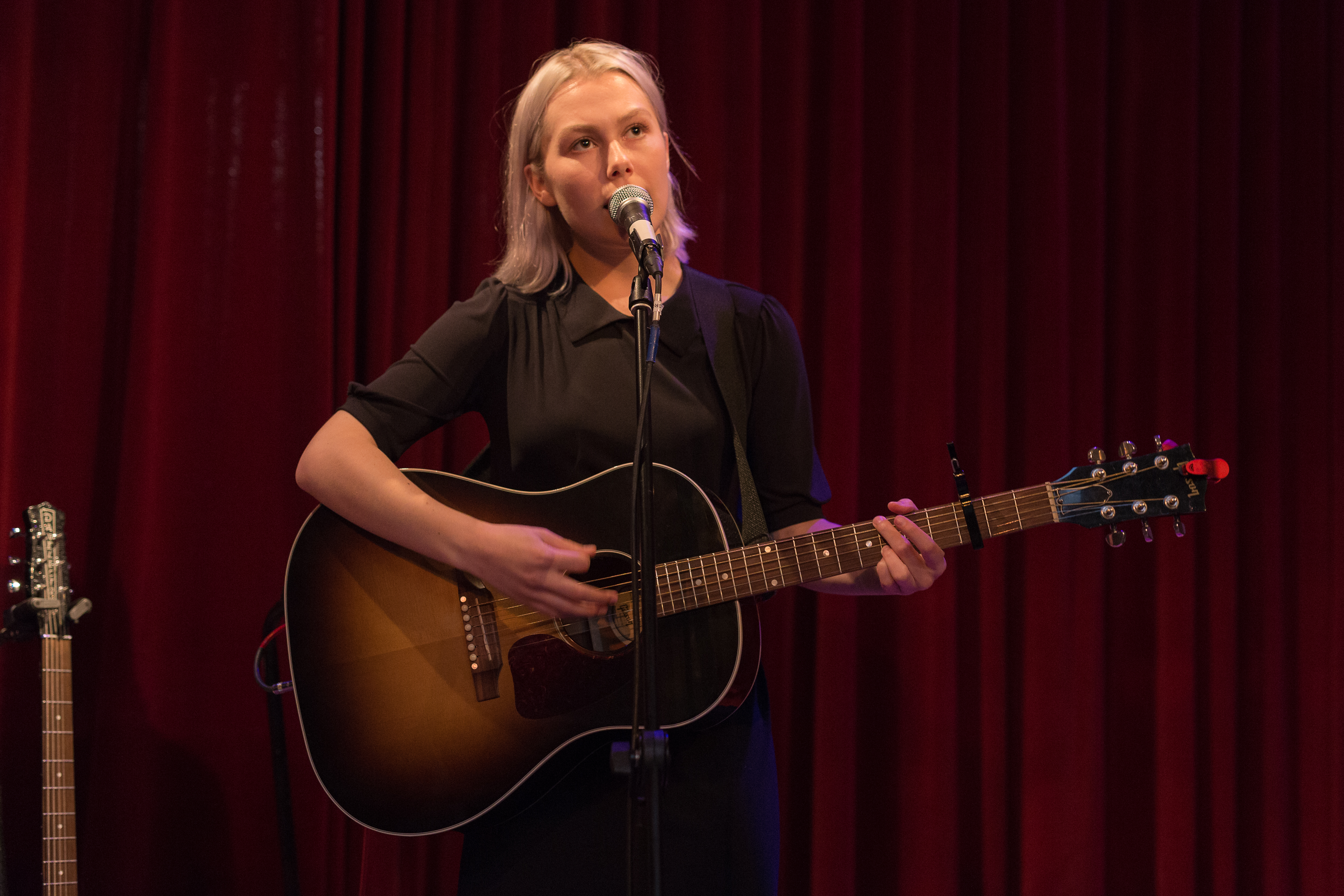
"Nothing New" features Phoebe Bridgers (pictured in 2017).

After signing a new contract with Republic Records, the American singer-songwriter Taylor Swift began re-recording her first six studio albums in November 2020. The decision followed a public 2019 dispute between Swift and the talent manager Scooter Braun, who acquired Big Machine Records, including the masters of Swift's albums which the label had released. By re-recording the albums, Swift had full ownership of the new masters, which enabled her to control the licensing of her songs for commercial use and therefore substituted the Big Machine–owned masters. On April 9, 2021, Swift released the first re-recorded album, Fearless (Taylor's Version), a re-recording of her second studio album Fearless (2008); the album also featured several unreleased "From the Vault" tracks that she had written but left out of the original albums' track listings.

For Swift's next re-recorded album, Red (Taylor's Version) (2021), she re-recorded all of the 30 songs she had intended for her fourth studio album Red (2012). The original album incorporated country and new styles of pop and rock, as a result of her experimenting with other styles; this prompted a debate over her status as a country artist at the time. Like the previous re-recorded album, Red (Taylor's Version) features nine "From the Vault" tracks among the 30 songs. One such track was "Nothing New". Swift revealed in her Lover Journals that she wrote the song on an Appalachian dulcimer while on a flight from Sydney to Perth during her 2012 Australian tour. The date of this flight was February 29, 2012. As is referenced in the song, she was 22 years old at that time. Swift later approached Aaron Dessner to produce it with her and Phoebe Bridgers to feature vocals on the track for Red (Taylor's Version).

== Music and lyrics ==
I've been thinking a lot about getting older and relevancy and how all my heroes have ended up alone.

— Swift describing what led her to write "Nothing New", 2012

"Nothing New" is an alternative rock and folk ballad. Its duration lasts for 4 minutes and 18 seconds. The song features a melancholic production driven by guitar and incorporates understated cello, light strings, keyboard, piano, synthesizers, and violin. It was recorded at Long Pond Studios in Hudson Valley. Swift's vocals were recorded at Kitty Committee Studios in Belfast and Bridgers's vocals were recorded at Sound City Studios in Los Angeles. The song was mixed at Long Pond and mastered at Sterling Sound in Edgewater, New Jersey.

The lyrics are about anxiety over romance and growing up. In the chorus, Swift sings, "How can a person know everything at 18 but nothing at 22?" reflecting on her growing up, and "Will you still want me when I'm nothing new?" In the views of Olivia Horn from Pitchfork, "Nothing New" is not only about romantic anxieties, but also about "the music business' famously fickle relationship to young women". Laura Snapes from The Guardian agreed with this idea, citing the lyric "People love an ingenue" as Swift's internalized pressure to stay in the public eye. In a journal entry dated March 2, 2012, Swift wrote that the song is about "being scared of aging and things changing and losing what you have". (Note: The journal entry was published in the deluxe edition booklet of Swift's 2019 album Lover.)

== Release and reception ==
"Nothing New" was released as the 23rd track on Red (Taylor's Version) via Republic on November 12, 2021. The song peaked the top 40 on national charts in Australia (31), Canada (22), and Ireland (25). In the United States, "Nothing New" debuted both on the Billboard Hot 100 and Hot Country Songs, with peaks of number 43 and number 11 respectively. On other non-national charts, it reached number 33 on the Billboard Global 200 and number 11 on the United Kingdom's Audio Streaming Chart. After the album's release, Swift embarked on the Eras Tour in March 2023, where she would perform various songs across her discography and would feature different opening acts at each concert, and Bridgers was one of them. At concerts opened by her, "Nothing New" was added on the tour's set list, in which both Swift and Bridgers performed the track.

In reviews of Red (Taylor's Version), critics generally praised "Nothing New" for its emotional sentiments, Swift's songwriting, and Bridgers's performance. They picked it as an album highlight (Note: Attributed to Pitchfork's Olivia Horn, Spin's Bobby Olivier, and The Guardian's Laura Snapes) and one of the best "From the Vault" tracks. (Note: Attributed to The New York Times' Lindsay Zoladz and the Los Angeles Times' Mikael Wood) The New York Times' Lindsay Zoladz, Billboard's Jason Lipshutz, Variety's Chris Willman complimented Bridgers's vocals and the thoughtful lyrics. Carrie Battan of The New Yorker compared "Nothing New" to the "folksy poeticism" of Swift's 2020 albums Folklore and Evermore. Angie Martoccio of Rolling Stone lauded the collaboration: "Swift's adult voice combines with Bridgers' honey-soaked, hushed vocals, melding together in an autumn rush that brushes against your cheek". Some critics praised Swift's double entendre message about the music industry (Note: Attributed to Pitchfork's Olivia Horn, Spin's Bobby Olivier, and The Guardian's Laura Snapes)—The A.V. Club editor Saloni Gajjar opined that its "extremely relatable even if you’re not a globally recognized musician." For the Los Angeles Times, Mikael Wood highlighted its double entendre lyrics and nostalgic sentiments during the age of internet culture.

Critics have ranked "Nothing New" highly among Swift's bonus/vault tracks. Willman and Josh Kurp from Uproxx both ranked it sixth among over 25 vault tracks that Swift released; they praised Bridgers's appearance and the emotionally resonant lyrics. Time writers ranked it first in their list; the critic Rachel Sonis wrote: "It's interesting, if a little sad, that Swift was plagued with this thought at only 22 when she wrote this song, knowing where she is now."

== Credits and personnel ==
Credits adapted from Red (Taylor's Version) album liner notes

- Taylor Swift – lead vocals, songwriter, producer
- Phoebe Bridgers – lead vocals
- Aaron Dessner – producer, recording engineer, acoustic guitar, bass guitar, guitar, keyboard, piano, synthesizers
- Tony Berg – vocal producer
- Bella Blasko – recording engineer
- Bryce Dessner – orchestrator
- Clarice Jensen – cello, cello recording
- Jonathan Low – recording engineer, mixing engineer
- Randy Merrill – mastering engineer
- Christopher Rowe – vocal recording
- Will Maclellan – vocal recording
- Kyle Resnick – violin recording
- Yuki Numata Resnick – violin

== Charts ==
Chart performance for "Nothing New"
Chart (2021)	Peak position
Australia (ARIA)	31
Canada Hot 100 (Billboard)	22
Global 200 (Billboard)	33
Ireland (IRMA)	25
Portugal (AFP)	158
UK Audio Streaming (Official Charts)	44
US Billboard Hot 100	43
US Hot Country Songs (Billboard)	11

== Certifications ==
Certifications for "Nothing New"
Region	Certification	Certified units/sales
Australia (ARIA)	Platinum	70,000^{‡}
Brazil (Pro-Música Brasil)	Gold	20,000^{‡}
New Zealand (RMNZ)	Gold	15,000^{‡}
United Kingdom (BPI)	Silver	200,000^{‡}
^{‡} Sales+streaming figures based on certification alone.
