= Ronan (song) =

2012 charity single by Taylor Swift

Single by Taylor Swift
- Released: September 8, 2012
- Genre: Soft rock
- Length: 4:25
- Label: Big Machine
- Songwriters: Taylor Swift; Maya Thompson
- Producer: Taylor Swift

Taylor Swift singles chronology
"We Are Never Ever Getting Back Together" (2012)	"Ronan" (2012)	"Begin Again" (2012)

Audio video
- "Ronan" on YouTube

"Ronan" is a charity single by the American singer-songwriter Taylor Swift. It was released as an iTunes-exclusive download on September 8, 2012, by Big Machine Records. The lyrics are based on a blog by Maya Thompson about her three-year-old son Ronan, who died from neuroblastoma in 2011. Swift wrote and produced the song by putting together quotes from the blog, crediting Maya Thompson as co-writer. All proceeds from sales of "Ronan" were donated for charity causes to raise awareness of and fight against cancer.

Musically, "Ronan" is a soft rock ballad instrumented by a sole finger-picked guitar with occasional piano tunes and minimal drum brushes. Music critics have lauded the song artistically, deeming it a prime example of Swift's abilities as a singer-songwriter to evoke vivid emotional sentiments through her songwriting. The single peaked at number 16 on the US Billboard Hot 100 and was certified gold by the Recording Industry Association of America. A re-recorded version, "Ronan (Taylor's Version)", was included in Swift's 2021 re-recorded album Red (Taylor's Version).

== Background ==
Taylor Swift wrote the song after reading Maya Thompson's blog. Thompson is the mother of three-year-old Ronan Thompson, who died in 2011 of neuroblastoma. He had been treated at Barrow Neurological Institute at Phoenix Children's Hospital. Maya began writing in August 2010 when Ronan was diagnosed and she continued penning her entries in the blog Rockstar Ronan during the nine months that Ronan suffered from the illness before dying in May 2011, just three days before his fourth birthday. Maya worked through her grief by continuing the blog, writing letters to her late son whilst raising money and awareness for childhood cancer causes.

The pair met in October 2011, when Swift invited Maya to her concert at the Desert Diamond Arena in Glendale, Arizona. She wrote about her reaction when Taylor told her that she'd penned the song inspired by her blog entries; addressing her late son, Thompson said that her calmness "...soon turned to complete and utter frozen shock when these words came out of her mouth: 'I wrote a song for Ronan.' The tears started pouring down my cheeks as soon as I heard her say those words. But her words didn't stop there. Not only did she write a song for you, but she wanted to know if it would be alright to perform it on the nationally televised Stand Up to Cancer show..." Swift credits Thompson as the co-writer of the song. It was released to the US iTunes Store shortly after the Stand Up to Cancer telethon ended, and all proceeds of the single go towards cancer charities.

== Composition and reception ==
Mark Hogan of Spin magazine describes "Ronan" as a soft rock ballad. Swift wrote and produced the song based on the blog entries by co-writer Maya Thompson.

"Ronan" received universal acclaim from critics. Rolling Stone called the song "heartbreaking". Bill Dukes of Taste of Country wrote: "It was clear [Swift] was just the voice for Maya Thompson..." Ed Masley of The Arizona Republic said that "'Ronan' may very well be [Swift's] finest hour as an artist." Thompson herself, in a 2012 interview with MTV, recalled her experience listening to Swift's live rendition at Stand Up to Cancer: "Listening to it was very emotional and I was blown away by how she got it. She got it in a way that most people don't. She took the time to take the intimate parts of things I'd written and put them into the song." Thompson's portion of the proceeds from her co-writing credit went to her Ronan Thompson Foundation.

== Commercial performance ==
In its first week of release, "Ronan" received 211,000 downloads, resulting in a number-two debut on the Digital Song Sales chart in the United States. It was blocked from the top spot by Swift's own "We Are Never Ever Getting Back Together" (2012), making her the first artist to occupy the chart's top-two spots since Kesha in 2010 and the fifth overall to do so. "Ronan" also entered on both the country's Billboard Hot 100 and Hot Country Songs charts, peaking at numbers 16 and 34, respectively. On May 1, 2013, the Recording Industry Association of America awarded the song with a gold certification, which denotes 500,000 track-equivalent units based on sales.

== Live performances ==
Swift first performed the song live for Stand Up to Cancer in September 2012, and has only performed it publicly one other time, when Maya Thompson attended the Glendale, Arizona stop of The 1989 World Tour on August 17, 2015.

== Charts ==
Weekly chart performance for "Ronan"
Chart (2012)	Peak position
US Billboard Hot 100	16
US Hot Country Songs (Billboard)	34

== Certification ==
Certification for "Ronan"
Region	Certification	Certified units/sales
United States (RIAA)	Gold	500,000^{*}
^{*} Sales figures based on certification alone.

== "Ronan (Taylor's Version)" ==
"Ronan (Taylor's Version)"

Song by Taylor Swift

from the album Red (Taylor's Version)
- Released: November 12, 2021
- Studio: Kitty Committee Studios (Belfast, Northern Ireland); Blackbird Studio (Nashville, TN); Prime Recording (Nashville, TN)
- Length: 4:24
- Label: Republic
- Songwriters: Taylor Swift; Maya Thompson
- Producers: Taylor Swift; Christopher Rowe

Lyric video
- "Ronan (Taylor's Version)" on YouTube

Swift re-recorded "Ronan", subtitled "(Taylor's Version)", for her second re-recorded album, Red (Taylor's Version), released on November 12, 2021, through Republic Records. Prior to the re-recording, Thompson confirmed she had granted Swift permission. A lyric video for the track was confirmed through Thompson via Twitter on November 11, 2021, the day before the album was released. The video contains images and home video footage of Ronan with Thompson, provided to Swift by Thompson herself.

I've recently completed the re-recording of my 4th album, Red. It's really exceeded my expectations in so many ways, and one of those ways is that I thought it would be appropriate to add "Ronan" to this album. Red was an album of heartbreak and healing, of rage and rawness, of tragedy and trauma, and of the loss of an imagined future alongside someone. I wrote "Ronan" while I was making Red and discovered your story as you so honestly and devastatingly told it. My genuine hope is that you'll agree with me that this song should be included on this album. As my co-writer and the rightful owner of this story in its entirety, your opinion and approval of this idea really matters to me, and I'll honor your wishes here.

— An excerpt from Swift's letter to Thompson

=== Charts ===
Chart performance for "Ronan (Taylor's Version)"
Chart (2021)	Peak position
Canada Hot 100 (Billboard)	88
Global 200 (Billboard)	142
US Bubbling Under Hot 100 (Billboard)	9
US Hot Country Songs (Billboard)	42

== See also ==
- "Soon You'll Get Better" – a 2019 song by Swift about her mother's health conditions
