= I Bet You Think About Me =

2021 single by Taylor Swift featuring Chris Stapleton

Single by Taylor Swift featuring Chris Stapleton

from the album Red (Taylor's Version)
- Written: June 2011
- Released: November 15, 2021
- Studio: Hoffman Streets; Long Pond (New York); Kitty Committee (Belfast); Sputnik Sound (Nashville); EBC (London)
- Genre: Country; folk-pop
- Length: 4:45
- Label: Republic
- Songwriters: Taylor Swift; Lori McKenna
- Producers: Taylor Swift; Aaron Dessner

Taylor Swift singles chronology
"Renegade" (2021)	"I Bet You Think About Me" (2021)	"Message in a Bottle" (2021)

Chris Stapleton singles chronology
"Glow" (2021)	"I Bet You Think About Me" (2021)	"Easy on Me" (2021)

Music video
- "I Bet You Think About Me" on YouTube

"I Bet You Think About Me" (Note: Subtitled "(Taylor's Version) (from the Vault)") is a song by the American singer-songwriter Taylor Swift from her second re-recorded album, Red (Taylor's Version) (2021). Featuring Chris Stapleton, it is one of the album's "From the Vault" tracks that were intended for but excluded from Swift's 2012 studio album, Red. Swift wrote the song with Lori McKenna in June 2011 and produced it with Aaron Dessner. Republic Records and MCA Nashville released the track to country radio in the United States on November 15, 2021.

"I Bet You Think About Me" is a country and folk-pop ballad with a harmonica-laced production that incorporates acoustic guitars, lap steel guitars, high-strung guitars, and a string section. Its tongue-in-cheek lyrics contrast the narrator's humble upbringing with an ex-lover's pretentious, high-class lifestyle. The accompanying music video, which marked Blake Lively's directorial debut, stars Swift as a woman who attempts to sabotage the wedding of her ex-boyfriend (Miles Teller).

Music critics generally complimented the country production, songwriting, and Stapleton's vocals. "I Bet You Think About Me" peaked at number 22 on the Billboard Global 200 and entered on the charts in Australia, Canada, and the United States. The song was nominated for Best Country Song at the 65th Annual Grammy Awards, and the music video was nominated for Video of the Year at both the 57th Academy of Country Music Awards and 56th Annual Country Music Association Awards.

== Background and release ==
After ending her 13-year contract with Big Machine Records and signing a new deal with Republic Records in 2018, Taylor Swift began re-recording her first six studio albums in November 2020. The decision followed a public 2019 dispute between Swift and the talent manager Scooter Braun, who had acquired Big Machine, including the masters of her albums which the label had released. By re-recording the albums, Swift had full ownership of the new masters, which enabled her to encourage licensing of her re-recorded songs for commercial use in hopes of substituting the Big Machine-owned masters.

In April 2021, Swift released her first re-recorded album: the re-recording of her 2008 studio album Fearless, subtitled Taylor's Version. In addition to the re-recorded tracks, it contained several unreleased "From the Vault" tracks that she had written but left out of the original album. On November 12, 2021, she released her second re-recorded album: the re-recorded version of her 2012 studio album Red, also subtitled Taylor's Version. As with its predecessor, Red (Taylor's Version) also includes "From the Vault" tracks that Swift had intended for but left out of the original Red.

"I Bet You Think About Me" is one of the vault tracks on Red (Taylor's Version). Swift wrote the song while staying in Foxborough, Massachusetts, to play two Gillette Stadium shows as part of her Speak Now World Tour in June 2011. She then contacted the American musician Lori McKenna, whom she had known through their mutual friend Liz Rose, to ask McKenna to join the song as a co-writer. The two completed writing at McKenna's house in Stoughton, Massachusetts within the first day of the Gillette show. McKenna recalled that Swift had the rough idea and title, and she helped Swift "bounce stuff off of". Officially titled "I Bet You Think About Me (Taylor's Version) (From the Vault)", it is track number 26 on Red (Taylor's Version). Republic Records and MCA Nashville released the song to US country radio on November 15, 2021. On April 30, 2023, Swift performed "I Bet You Think About Me" on guitar as a "surprise song" at Mercedes-Benz Stadium in Atlanta, as part of her sixth headlining concert tour, the Eras Tour.

== Production and lyrics ==
"I Bet You Think About Me"
A 23-second sample of "I Bet You Think About Me", where Swift and Stapleton sing at the end of the verse.

Swift produced "I Bet You Think About Me" with Aaron Dessner, who recorded and engineered the track with Jonathan Low. Christopher Rowe recorded Swift's lead vocals at Kitty Committee Studio in Belfast, Northern Ireland. Dessner played acoustic guitar, bass guitar, high-strung guitar, and piano. Josh Kaufman was an additional recording engineer and played the harmonica, electric guitar, and lap steel guitar. The track features a string section (consisting of violins, violas, cellos) played by the London Contemporary Orchestra; their performance was conducted by Robert Ames, orchestrated by Dessner's brother Bryce Dessner, and recorded by Jeremy Murphy at the EBC Studio in London. Chris Stapleton's vocals were recorded at Sputnik Sound Studio in Nashville. Low mixed the track and Dessner recorded the instruments that he played at Long Pond Studios in New York.

The end product is a country and folk-pop ballad. It has a harmonica-driven production with twangy vocals and background vocal harmonies from Stapleton. In the lyrics, Swift makes multiple sarcastic remarks towards an ex-lover and his lifestyle. Swift said, "We wanted this song to be like a comedic, tongue-in-cheek, funny, not caring what anyone thinks about you sort of breakup song", and explained that she and McKenna wanted to write a drinking song. The ex-lover in question has made Swift feel inferior towards him; she fails to fit in with his "upper-crust circles", and he has once told her that he and Swift are "too different". Recounting the differences between the two former partners' childhoods, she labels herself as a girl "raised on a farm" and the ex-lover as someone born with a "silver spoon" and from a "gated community. At the end of the song, Swift additionally references her ex-lover's "cool indie concerts", "organic shoes", and "million-dollar [couches]". She concludes the song by referring to her songwriting profession: "When you say, 'Oh my god, she's insane, she wrote a song about me?'/ I bet you think about me."

== Reception ==
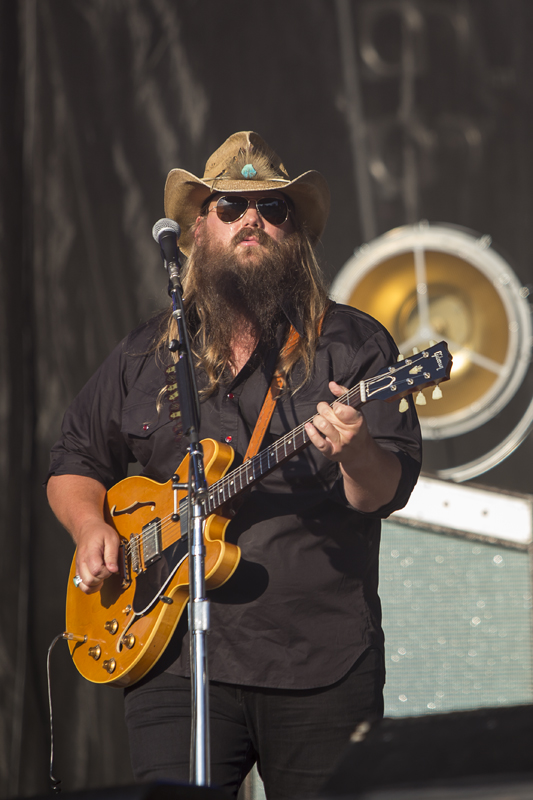
Critics generally praised Chris Stapleton's guest appearance.

Music critics praised the production, Swift's songwriting, and Stapleton's guest appearance. Variety's Chris Willman gave "I Bet You Think About Me" a five-star rating and lauded the lyrics as sharp. Although Willman considered Stapleton's guest appearance too short, he praised the country production as rowdier compared to Swift's early artistic output. Jessica Nicholson from Billboard complimented Stapleton's "burnished, bluesy vocal" and the "well-crafted" lyrics about a kiss-off to a high-class ex-lover. Also from Billboard, Jason Lipshutz remarked that Swift's "deadpanning" delivery highlighted her wittiness. In USA Today, Melissa Ruggieri wrote that Stapleton's "whiskey-hued vocals are the beautiful sandpaper to Swift's sleek voice" and found the lyrics some of Swift's "snarkiest". Time's critics in 2023 placed "I Bet You Think About Me" fourth on their ranking of Swift's 25 vault tracks; Moises Mendes II commended the lyricism and deemed Stapleton a fitting guest vocalist. Josh Kurp of Uproxx ranked it seventh out of 26 vault tracks and said that the "sarcastic" lyricism made it a good drinking song. At the 65th Annual Grammy Awards (2023), the song received a nomination for Best Country Song.

After Red (Taylor's Version) was released, "I Bet You Think About Me" debuted at number 22 on the US Billboard Hot 100 chart dated November 27, 2021. According to MusicRow, it was the most added song on country radio during its first week of release. The single peaked at number 23 on the Country Airplay chart and number three on the Hot Country Songs chart. In Canada, "I Bet You Think About Me" reached number 17 on the Canadian Hot 100 and number 34 on the Canada Country chart. The song peaked at number 22 on the Billboard Global 200, number 43 on the ARIA Singles Chart in Australia, and number 75 on the UK Streaming Chart in the United Kingdom.

== Music video ==
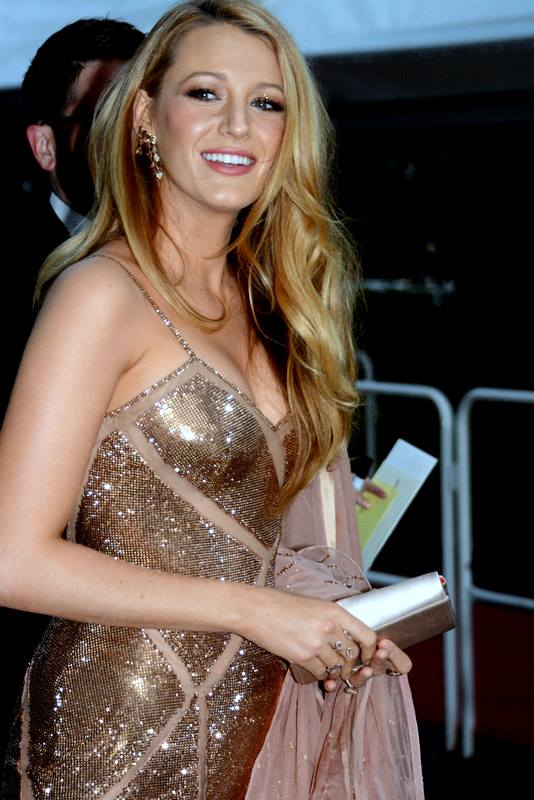
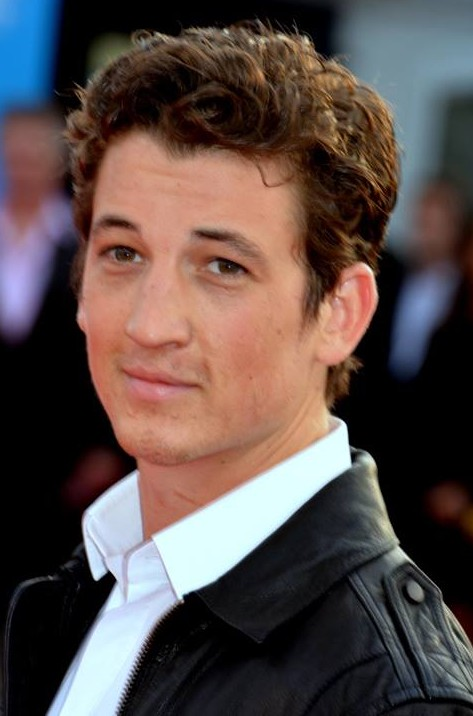
The video marked the directorial debut of Blake Lively (left) and stars Miles Teller (right).

A music video for "I Bet You Think About Me" premiered on the video-sharing platform YouTube on November 15, 2021. Swift and the American actress Blake Lively wrote the treatment for the video, and the latter directed it in her directorial debut. The video documents a wedding, with the wedding couple played by the actor Miles Teller and his wife Keleigh Sperry, who had been a friend of Swift's for years. Swift plays an ex-girlfriend who intrudes upon the wedding. Aaron Dessner has a cameo as a member of the wedding band, while Swift's brother Austin Swift is credited as a producer for the music video. Stapleton does not appear in the video. In 2022, the music video was nominated for Video of the Year at the 57th Academy of Country Music Awards and Video of the Year at the 56th Annual Country Music Association Awards.

=== Synopsis ===
The 6-minute video begins with Teller's character in a bathroom, practicing a speech for his wedding, though he feels frustrated and seems to sense that something is off. At the wedding ceremony, Swift wreaks havoc wherever she goes: first, she disrupts cocktail hour as a catering server. Next, she ruins the wedding cake and prompts a young bridesmaid to do the same. Then, after giving a toast at the banquet--during which she gives the bride (played by Teller's real wife, Keleigh Sperry) a red scarf--she chugs wine and faints in front of the guests. Lastly, while eating, she makes several young girls stick out their middle fingers.

After being blinded by the light from a camera, Teller opens his eyes to find himself on a dance floor, empty except for Swift, who is now donning a wedding dress. Time seems to have frozen around them, as none of the watching guests move. The two dance together, until Swift pulls away. Her wedding dress turns into a red gown, and she and her band play "I Bet You Think About Me" for him as everything else at the wedding turns red in color. The destroyed wedding cake repairs itself, and inside his mind, Teller sees himself and Swift dancing again, with her repetitively pulling away. The video ends with Teller in the bathroom again, who has now realized the life he and Swift could have had, had he not left her.

== Personnel ==
Credits are adapted from the liner notes of Red (Taylor's Version).

Production

- Taylor Swift – lead vocals, songwriter, producer
- Lori McKenna – songwriter
- Chris Stapleton – background vocals
- Aaron Dessner – producer, recording engineer
- Michael Fahey – assistant vocal recording
- Josh Kaufman – additional recording engineer
- Jonathan Low – recording engineer, mixer
- Jeremy Murphy – strings recording
- Vance Powell – vocal recording
- Christopher Rowe – vocal recording

Musicians

- Robert Ames – conductor
- Bryce Dessner – orchestrator
- London Contemporary Orchestra – orchestra
- Aaron Dessner – acoustic guitar, bass guitar, high-strung guitar, piano
- Josh Kaufman – electric guitar, harmonica, lap steel guitar
- Zara Benyounes – first violin
- Galya Bisengalieva – first violin
- Antonia Kesel – first violin
- Natalie Kouda – first violin
- Anna Ovsyanikova – first violin
- Charlotte Reid – first violin
- Dave Brown – double bass
- Anna de Bruin – second violin
- Guy Button – second violin
- Charis Jenson – second violin
- Nicole Crespo O'Donoghue – second violin
- Nicole Stokes – second violin
- Eloisa-Fleur Thom – second violin
- Stephanie Edmudson – viola
- Clifton Harrison – viola
- Matthew Kettle – viola
- Zoe Matthews – viola
- Jonny Byers – cello
- Oliver Coates – cello
- Max Ruisi – cello
- James Krivchenia – drums, percussion

== Charts ==
=== Weekly charts ===
Weekly chart performance for "I Bet You Think About Me"
Chart (2021–2022)	Peak position
Australia (ARIA)	43
Canada Hot 100 (Billboard)	17
Canada Country (Billboard)	34
Global 200 (Billboard)	22
UK Audio Streaming (Official Charts)	75
US Billboard Hot 100	22
US Country Airplay (Billboard)	23
US Hot Country Songs (Billboard)	3

=== Year-end charts ===
2022 year-end chart performance for "I Bet You Think About Me"
Chart (2022)	Position
US Hot Country Songs (Billboard)	69

== Certifications ==
Certifications "I Bet You Think About Me"
Region	Certification	Certified units/sales
Australia (ARIA)	Gold	35,000^{‡}
Brazil (Pro-Música Brasil)	Gold	20,000^{‡}
New Zealand (RMNZ)	Gold	15,000^{‡}
United Kingdom (BPI)	Silver	200,000^{‡}
^{‡} Sales+streaming figures based on certification alone.

== Release history ==
Release dates and formats for "I Bet You Think About Me"
Region	Date	Format	Label(s)	Ref.
Various	November 12, 2021	Digital download	Republic	
United States	November 15, 2021	Country radio	Republic; MCA Nashville	
