= Red (Taylor's Version) =

2021 re-recorded album by Taylor Swift

Studio album (re-recorded) by Taylor Swift
- Released: November 12, 2021
- Studios: Ballroom West (Los Angeles); Blackbird (Nashville); Capitol B (Los Angeles); Conway Recording (Los Angeles); Electric Lady (New York City); The Garage (Topanga); House Mouse (Stockholm); Instrument Landing (Minneapolis); Kallbacken (Stockholm); Kitty Committee (Belfast); Long Pond (New York City); Prime Recording (Nashville); Sterloid Sounds (Los Angeles)
- Genres: Pop; arena rock; country
- Length: 130:26
- Label: Republic
- Producers: Taylor Swift; Christopher Rowe; Shellback; Aaron Dessner; Jack Antonoff; Elvira Anderfjärd; Dan Wilson; Jeff Bhasker; Jacknife Lee; Butch Walker; Espionage

Taylor Swift chronology
Fearless (Taylor's Version) (2021)	Red (Taylor's Version) (2021)	Midnights (2022)

Singles from Red (Taylor's Version)
- 1. "I Bet You Think About Me" Released: November 15, 2021; 2. "Message in a Bottle" Released: November 15, 2021

Red (Taylor's Version) is the second re-recorded album by the American singer-songwriter Taylor Swift, released on November 12, 2021, through Republic Records. A re-recording of Swift's fourth studio album, Red (2012), it was part of her re-recording project following the 2019 dispute over the master recordings of her back catalog.

In addition to re-recorded versions of songs from the original album, Red (Taylor's Version) includes the re-recording of the 2012 charity single "Ronan" and nine tracks denoted as "From the Vault": (Note: This article refers to these tracks as "vault tracks" hereafter for concision.) six unreleased songs, a 10-minute-long version of "All Too Well", and Swift's solo versions of "Better Man" (2016) and "Babe" (2018), which she had written for other artists. Swift and most original producers reprised their works on the re-recorded tracks with additions from Christopher Rowe, and the vault tracks were produced by Aaron Dessner, Jack Antonoff, Elvira Anderfjärd, and Espionage. Featured artists include Phoebe Bridgers, Chris Stapleton, and Ed Sheeran, with the lattermost contributing vocals to two tracks.

Red (Taylor's Version) is a genre-blending album that combines pop, country, rock, and electronic, featuring acoustic instruments, strings, and electronic keyboards. Its songs address the different dynamics of love and heartbreak. The album received unanimous acclaim for Swift's vocals, its enhanced production quality, and the vault tracks. Red (Taylor's Version) topped the charts in Argentina, Australia, Canada, Ireland, New Zealand, Portugal, and the United Kingdom. In the United States, it was Swift's fourth number-one on the Billboard 200 in less than 16 months, registering the shortest time span for an artist to collect four number-one albums. It was certified six-times platinum by the Recording Industry Association of America.

Swift promoted the album with televised appearances on NBC talk shows and a self-directed short film accompanying "All Too Well (10 Minute Version)". Red (Taylor's Version) broke the record for the most single-week new entries by an artist, with 26 of its tracks charting on the Billboard Hot 100; "All Too Well (10 Minute Version)" became the longest song to ever top the chart. The vault tracks "I Bet You Think About Me" and "Message in a Bottle" were promoted as radio singles. Publications have credited Red (Taylor's Version) with popularizing the "Sad Girl Autumn" popular culture phenomenon. The album won a Billboard Music Award, two American Music Awards, and an NME Award.

== Background ==
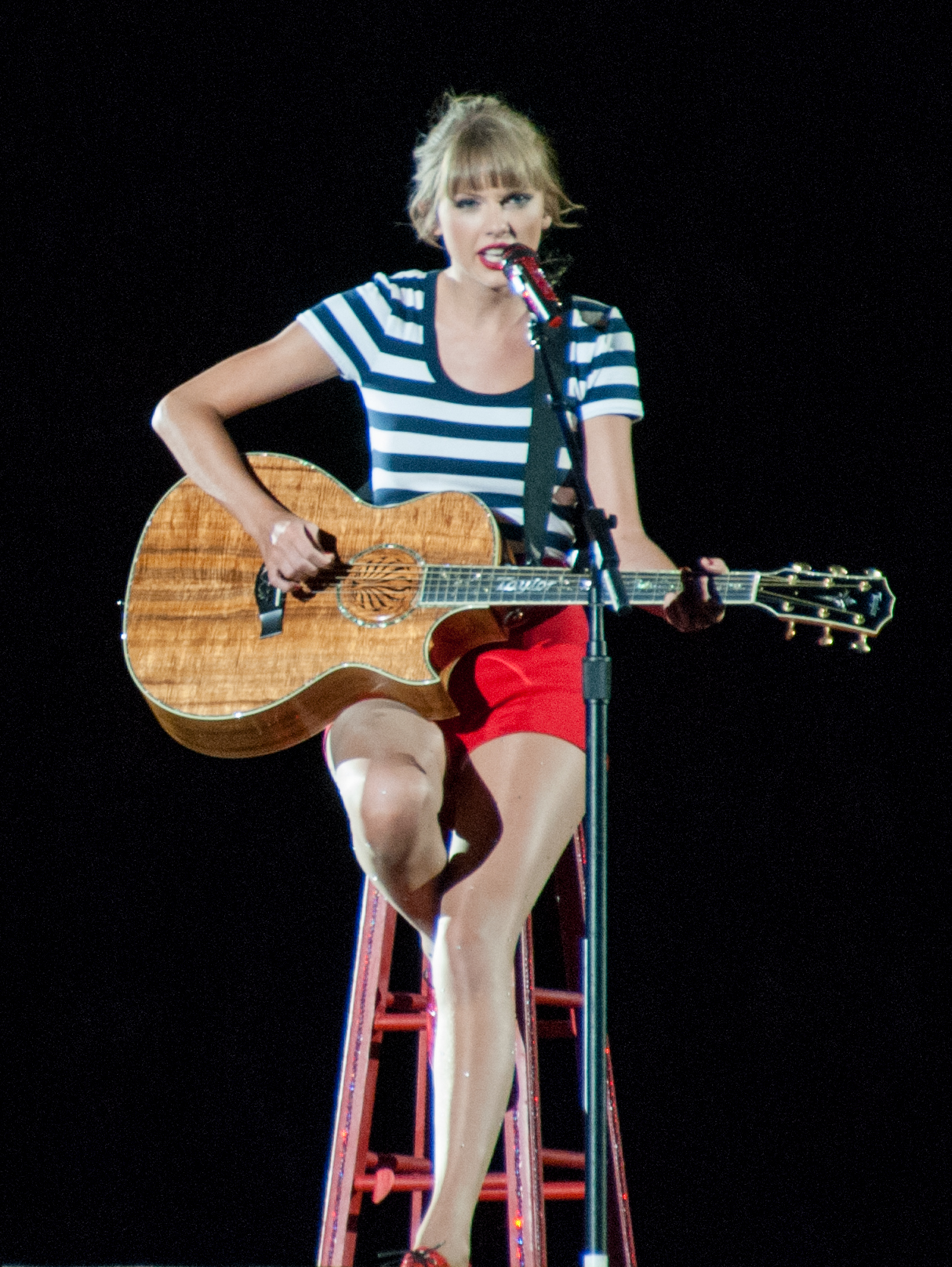
Swift performing on the Red Tour (2013)

Taylor Swift signed a recording contract with Nashville-based independent record label Big Machine in 2005. As part of the contract, Big Machine released Swift's first six studio albums, from Taylor Swift (2006) to Reputation (2017). Her fourth studio album, Red, was released on October 22, 2012. It expanded beyond the country stylings of her past albums and explored styles of mainstream pop and other genres. The album's lead single, "We Are Never Ever Getting Back Together", was Swift's first number-one song on the Billboard Hot 100. Other singles, "I Knew You Were Trouble" and "22", were commercially successful and propelled Swift towards pop stardom. Although critical reviews of Red were generally positive, its eclectic musical influences led to critics questioning Swift's country music identity; the album was retrospectively regarded as a testament to Swift's artistic versatility. Rolling Stone placed it at number 99 on its 2021 revision of the 500 Greatest Albums of All Time.

By August 2018, Swift's contract with Big Machine had expired; she signed a new contract with Republic Records, a division of Universal Music Group, which secured her the rights to own the masters of the new music she would release. In 2019, the talent manager Scooter Braun and his company, Ithaca Holdings, acquired Big Machine Records. The masters of Swift's Big Machine-released albums, including Red, were effectively transferred to Braun, which resulted in a public dispute between Swift and Braun. Swift denounced the purchase and began re-recording her first six studio albums, including Red, in November 2020. By re-recording the albums, Swift had full ownership of the new masters, which enabled her to control the licensing of her songs for commercial use and therefore substituted the Big Machine–owned masters.

The first in Swift's re-recording series was Fearless (Taylor's Version), which was released on April 9, 2021. It is the re-recording of her second studio album, Fearless (2008). In addition to re-recordings of the original Fearless album tracks, Fearless (Taylor's Version) includes several unreleased tracks denoted as "From the Vault". Fearless (Taylor's Version) became the first re-recorded album in history to top the US Billboard 200. Two months after the release of Fearless (Taylor's Version), on June 18, 2021, Swift announced Red (Taylor's Version) as her second re-recorded album; it is the re-recording of Red. In addition to the re-recordings of the original album tracks, Red (Taylor's Version) also includes nine vault tracks.

== Music and lyrics ==
=== Composition ===
In a social media post, Swift wrote that re-recording Red made her think of the album, both musically and lyrically, as "resembling a heartbroken person [...], all over the place, a fractured mosaic of feelings that somehow all fit together in the end". Music critics mostly characterized Red (Taylor's Version) as a pop album with eclectic musical styles, as with the original album. It also echoes the arena rock sound of its original recording, with songs that draw on country pop and pop rock styles. All songs feature the additional "Taylor's Version" moniker; they incorporate diverse sounds, including synth-pop, indie rock, electronic, dubstep, and folk, using both acoustic and electronic instruments. Tracks 1–20 are re-recordings of the original Red album songs, and they are country pop and experimental tracks intertwined between one another. Track 21 is the re-recording of "Ronan", a 2012 standalone charity single inspired by a four-year-old boy, Ronan Thompson, who died from cancer complications. Gary Lightbody of the rock band Snow Patrol and Ed Sheeran returned to feature on "The Last Time" and "Everything Has Changed", respectively.

All but one re-recorded tracks feature the same arrangements as their original versions; they were produced by their respective original producers, except Max Martin, Dann Huff, and Nathan Chapman, whose production was conducted by Swift and Christopher Rowe. "Girl at Home" was reworked from an acoustic number into a synth-pop track produced by Elvira Anderfjärd. The re-recorded tracks feature Swift's mature, deeper, and more resonant vocals, and a subtly sharper production that either tweaks or emphasizes certain instruments. Pitchfork's Olivia Horn wrote that the melody of "Sad Beautiful Tragic" might have tweaked "a note or two", USA Today's Melissa Ruggieri found the drums on "I Knew You Were Trouble" sharper and the guitars on "22" more defined, and NME's Hannah Mylrea described the opening drums on "State of Grace" as "crisper", the soft rock guitars on "Red" as "a little brighter", and the mandolin on "Stay Stay Stay" as "lifted". According to Carrie Battan from The New Yorker, some of the stronger instrumentation made the re-recorded album resemble a live performance.

=== "From the Vault" tracks ===
"Babe"
"Babe" was recorded by the country band Sugarland in 2018. Swift's version has a pop-ska arrangement with slide guitar, keyboards, and brass.

"Forever Winter"
"Forever Winter" is a power pop track incorporating horns, flutes, and guitars in its chorus.

Tracks 22–30 are labeled "From the Vault", which are songs Swift had written but did not include in the 2012 album. Two vault tracks—"Better Man" and "Babe"—are songs that had been written by Swift and recorded by Little Big Town in 2016 and Sugarland in 2018, respectively. The closing track, "All Too Well (10 Minute Version)", is an unabridged version of "All Too Well" that contains lyrics Swift wrote in 2011 before trimming down the track. Carson Mlnarik from MTV News wrote that some vault tracks featured Swift's country songwriting, which was a reminder of how "Red is a country album at its core". The vault tracks were produced by Swift, Shellback, Anderfjärd, Espionage, Jack Antonoff, and Aaron Dessner.

"Better Man" is a banjo-led country ballad that incorporates mandolin and strings with lyrics about the aftermath of a painful breakup. "Nothing New", a folk duet with Phoebe Bridgers, is about insecurities around aging and the social perceptions of young women. "Babe", whose version by Sugarland is a country song, is reworked into a pop-ska and country-pop arrangement consisting of slide guitar, keyboards, brass, and percussion. Its lyrics describe the missteps in a dissolving relationship.

"Message in a Bottle" is an upbeat dance-pop and electropop track about the beginnings of a romantic connection. "I Bet You Think About Me", featuring background harmony vocals by Chris Stapleton, is a harmonica-driven country ballad. It has tongue-in-cheek lyrics deriding an ex-lover's luxurious and pretentious lifestyle. "Forever Winter" is a power pop song opening with energetic brass before proceeding to the chorus that features Swift's dynamic vocals and incorporates horns, flutes, and guitars. Lyrically, "Forever Winter" is about Swift trying to help a friend through his mental health struggles.

"Run" is an acoustic indie folk-leaning duet with Ed Sheeran, who wrote the track with Swift the same day they wrote "Everything Has Changed". The production of "Run" is driven by a twiddling guitar and orchestral compositions, while its lyrics consist of romantic gestures. "The Very First Night" is an uptempo bubblegum and country pop song that sees Swift reminiscing about the first moments of a blossoming romance. "All Too Well (10 Minute Version)" is a slow ballad with a pop rock sound driven by a thudding and insistent bassline. It features additional verses that provide a richer context to the original song.

== Release and promotion ==
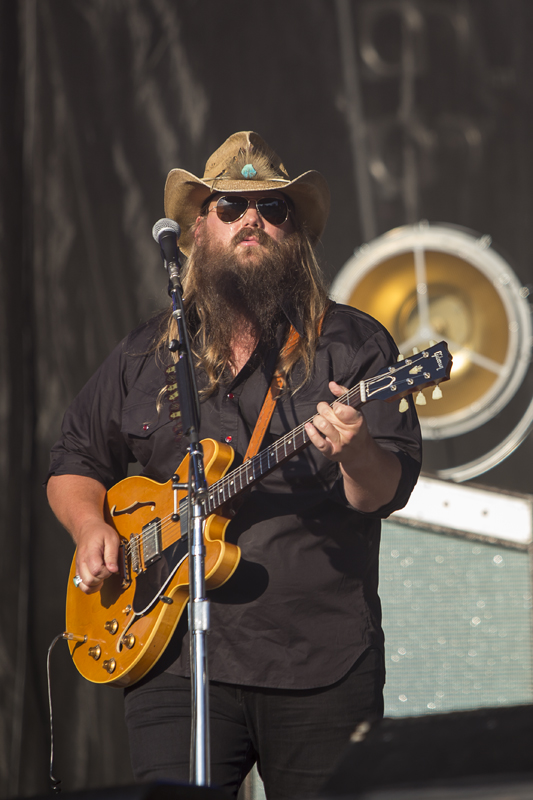
Chris Stapleton (pictured) features on the country-radio single "I Bet You Think About Me".

On June 18, 2021, Swift released the cover art of Red (Taylor's Version) and initially announced that the re-recorded album would be released on November 19, 2021. Alongside the announcement, pre-orders for the digital album were made available. The cover depicts Swift wearing red lipstick, a beige peacoat, and a burgundy-colored "Matti" fisherman velvet cap, seated in a vintage 1932 Chevrolet Cabriolet convertible with an autumnal background. Janessa Leoné designed the cap which quickly sold out on Leoné's website. The customized ring that Swift wears on the cover was designed by one of Swift's real-life friends. On August 5, 2021, Swift posted a video across her social media, teasing a word puzzle for the fans to solve; it spelled out "Chris Stapleton", "Phoebe Bridgers", "Babe", "Better Man", and "All Too Well Ten Minute Version". Concurrently, pre-orders for the album's CDs went up on Swift's website. She posted the official track listing on August 6.

On September 30, Swift announced Red (Taylor's Version) would be released on November 12, a week earlier than scheduled. She used social media to release snippets of several re-recorded songs prior to the album release: "22" and "I Knew You Were Trouble" via an Instagram story on August 5, "Red" via an Instagram video on October 24, and "Babe" via Tumblr on November 11. Via Republic Records, Red (Taylor's Version) was released for streaming, download, and physical formats of CD and vinyls, including limited editions with customized merchandise for the retailers Target Corporation, Walmart, and Urban Outfitters. In January 2022, five streaming "chapters" containing tracks from Red (Taylor's Version) were released: Could You Be the One Chapter, She Wrote a Song About Me Chapter, The Slow Motion Chapter, and From the Vault Chapter.

Starbucks partnered with Swift to commemorate the release of Red (Taylor's Version), which coincided with the company's "red cup holiday season". The fitness equipment manufacturer Peloton announced an exclusive collaboration with Swift to use songs from the album for their on-demand fitness classes. Swift promoted Red (Taylor's Version) via two NBC late-night talk shows, The Tonight Show Starring Jimmy Fallon and Late Night with Seth Meyers, which aired back-to-back on November 11. Concurrently with the album's release on November 12, she premiered All Too Well: The Short Film, which accompanied "All Too Well (10 Minute Version)" and stars herself, Sadie Sink, and Dylan O'Brien; she also performed the song at the premiere. The following day, she appeared as the musical guest and performed "All Too Well (10 Minute Version)" on a season 47 episode of Saturday Night Live. The song was a number-one hit on the Billboard Hot 100, becoming the longest number-one song in history, surpassing the 8-minutes-and-37-seconds "American Pie" (1971) by Don McLean. The vault tracks "I Bet You Think About Me" and "Message in a Bottle" were promoted as singles, respectively, to country radio and pop/adult contemporary radio formats.

== Critical reception ==
Professional ratings
Aggregate scores
Source	Rating
AnyDecentMusic?	8.6/10
Metacritic	91/100
Review scores
Source	Rating
AllMusic	3.5/5 stars
The A.V. Club	A−
Clash	9/10
The Guardian	4/5 stars
The Independent	5/5 stars
The Line of Best Fit	9/10
The New Zealand Herald	5/5 stars
NME	4/5 stars
Pitchfork	8.5/10
Rolling Stone	5/5 stars

Red (Taylor's Version) received universal critical acclaim. At Metacritic, which assigns a normalized rating out of 100 to reviews from professional publications, the album received a weighted mean score of 91 based on 16 reviews; it is Swift's highest-rated project on the site.

Lydia Burgham of The New Zealand Herald wrote that listening to Red (Taylor's Version) made her reflect on the original Red as Swift's "magnum opus". Many critics opined that the re-recorded tracks had better production with more emphasis on the instrumentation, including Rob Sheffield of Rolling Stone, Helen Brown of The Independent, and Hannah Mylrea of NME. Under the Radar's Andy Von Pip and Melissa Ruggieri of USA Today highlighted Swift's vocals as being more mature and warmer. The Line of Best Fit's Paul Bridgewater wrote that they were "subtly bolder and more assertive", and Kate Solomon of the i wrote that they had "newly limber muscles". Some critics, such as Bobby Olivier of Spin and Laura Snapes of The Guardian, thought that the changes in production and vocals brought forth a less intense listening experience than the original album, but Ruggieri opined that they "don't diminish the spirit of the 2012 edition".

The lyricism of Swift's songwriting was particularly well received. Red (Taylor's Version) was Pitchfork's "Best New Music" of its release week; Olivia Horn summed up the album as a representation of Swift's "ecstatic, expressive vocals, tart humor, vivid imagery, and tender attention to the nuances of love and loss". Von Pip wrote that the re-recorded album made the original's lyrical sentiments more lingering. Anna Leszkiewicz of the New Statesman described Red (Taylor's Version) as a masterful recount of complicated early-adulthood feelings, and Ana Clara Ribeiro of PopMatters wrote that the re-recorded album upheld the enduring lyrical sentiments that stood the test of time. In the Financial Times, Ludovic Hunter-Tilney wrote, "the songs' carousel of romantic drama still spins vibrantly, constructed with a winning mix of wit, design and sincerity." Beth Kirkbride of Clash said, Red (Taylor's Version) is a "medley of genres" toying with various styles and "an exercise in catharsis".

Some critics highlighted Swift's insight and musicality. Bridgewater opined that Red (Taylor's Version) "balances fan service alongside an insightful documentation of one of modern pop's best songwriters at a key juncture in her career", and added that Swift has carefully curated the expanded tracklist without devolving from the album's original appeal. Slant Magazine's Jonathan Keefe, The Atlantic's Spencer Kornhaber, and Consequence's Mary Siroky felt the expanded album testifies to Swift's musical growth, exuding "a stronger emotional resonance". Variety's Chris Willman appreciated the vault tracks.

== Accolades ==
Red (Taylor's Version) received many accolades of the music industry, such as placements on best-of lists. At the 2022 Billboard Music Awards, Swift received seven nominations, including wins for Top Country Album, Top Country Artist, Top Country Female Artist, and Top Billboard 200 Artist. At the 2022 American Music Awards, Swift won all six of her nominations, including Artist of the Year, Favorite Pop Female Artist, and Favorite Country Female Artist. At the 65th Annual Grammy Awards, "All Too Well (10 Minute Version)", All Too Well: The Short Film, and "I Bet You Think About Me" were nominated for Song of the Year, Best Music Video, and Best Country Song, respectively, with All Too Well: The Short Film winning its category.

Rankings on 2021 year-end lists
Publication	List	Rank	Ref.
Billboard	The 50 Best Albums of 2021	25	
Clash	The 50 Best Albums of 2021	12	
Insider	The Best Albums of 2021	4	
Metacritic	The 40 Best Albums of 2021	2	
People	The Top Albums of 2021	4	

Awards and nominations
Organization	Year	Award	Result	Ref.
Guinness World Records	2022	Most Day-one Streams of An Album on Spotify (Female)	Won	
NME Awards	2022	Best Reissue	Won	
Kids' Choice Awards	2022	Favorite Album	Nominated	
Billboard Music Awards	2022	Top Country Album	Won	
American Music Awards	2022	Favorite Pop/Rock Album	Won	
American Music Awards	2022	Favorite Country Album	Won	
ARIA Music Awards	2022	Best International Artist	Nominated	
Juno Awards	2023	International Album of the Year	Nominated	

== Commercial performance ==
Upon release, Red (Taylor's Version) broke the record for the most-streamed album created by a woman in a single day, surpassing Swift's Folklore (2020), and became the first female artist to amass over 100 million streams in a day on Spotify. The album sold over 1.2 million album-equivalent units globally in its first week. By December 2021, Spotify announced that Swift was the most-streamed woman on the platform of the year, and the second-most-streamed act overall, behind Bad Bunny. The International Federation of the Phonographic Industry recognized Swift as the Global Recording Artist of 2021, marking the third consecutive time. Red (Taylor's Version) sold 1.14 million copies globally in 2021.

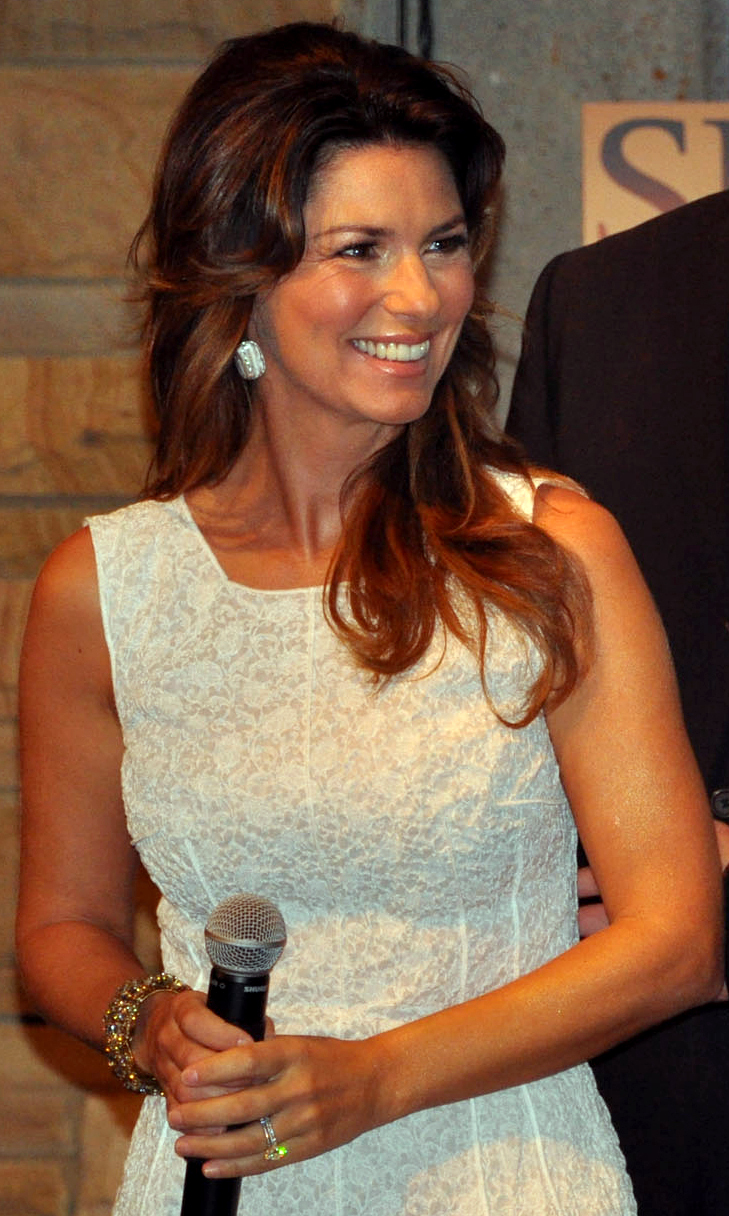
Red (Taylor's Version) helped Swift become the female artist with the most weeks at number one on Top Country Albums, surpassing Shania Twain (pictured).

In the United States, Red (Taylor's Version) debuted atop the Billboard 200 with 605,000 first-week units that consisted of 303.23 million on-demand streams—surpassing the largest streaming week for a country album previously held by Morgan Wallen's Dangerous: The Double Album (2021). The album opened with 369,000 pure album sales—the largest figure for a country album since Luke Bryan's Crash My Party (2014). It marked Swift's tenth Billboard 200 chart topper, making Swift claim the fastest duration to earn four number ones on the Billboard 200 (less than 16 months), breaking Elton John's 46-year-old record. Red (Taylor's Version) spent seven weeks atop Top Country Albums, which brought Swift's number of weeks at number one to 99, surpassing Shania Twain's 97-week record for a female artist. It was the second-best-selling album of 2021 in the United States and had surpassed 3.32 million US units by July 2023.

On the Billboard Hot 100, 26 of the album's tracks debuted in the same week—"State of Grace (Taylor's Version)" and "State of Grace (Acoustic Version) (Taylor's Version)" were counted as one entry, as were "All Too Well (Taylor's Version)" and "All Too Well (10 Minute Version)". This set the records for the most simultaneous debuts overall and chart entries by a female artist, both of which were previously set by Swift's Lover (2019). Four of those tracks reached the top 40 region, bringing Swift's sum of top-40 entries to 85—the third-highest sum in history, surpassing Elvis Presley. "All Too Well (Taylor's Version)" debuted at number one, marking the third time Swift debuted at number one on both the Billboard 200 and Hot 100 charts the same week—following "Cardigan" and Folklore in August 2020 and "Willow" and Evermore in December 2020—a record for any artist.

Red (Taylor's Version) peaked atop the albums charts in the Anglosphere countries, including Australia, Canada, Ireland, New Zealand, and the United Kingdom. In Canada, it was the fifth-best-selling album of 2021, ranking within the top 10 across digital, CD, and vinyl sales metrics. The album brought Swift's number of chart-topping albums to eight in the United Kingdom, nine in Australia—making Swift the first artist in history to have four number-one albums within two years, and seven in Ireland—the most for a female artist this millennium.

== Impact ==
During the release week of Red (Taylor's Version), numerous brands and organizations—such as M&M's, Skittles, the Kansas City Chiefs, Olive Garden, Teletubbies, Taco Bell, Oreo, Sour Patch Kids, and the French Embassy in the United States—used their social media accounts to endorse the album; some of them added "(Taylor's Version)" to their Twitter usernames. Paper wrote that Swift's impact was "felt across social media", with the brands "capitalizing on her momentum," while Inc. said that the companies leveraged the album's cultural relevance. Some media publications deemed Red (Taylor's Version) part of a 2021 music trend called "Sad Girl Autumn" or "Sad Girl Fall", which refers to the release of melancholic and introspective music by female artists during autumn. Swift released an acoustic rendition of "All Too Well (10 Minute Version)" subtitled "Sad Girl Autumn Version"; The Independent's Meredith Clark said that "we must thank [Swift] for originating the season", citing Red (Taylor's Version) as the chief reason.

The Wall Street Journal's Anne Steele highlighted the commercial performance of Red (Taylor's Version)—particularly how its tracks were outperforming the original recordings on streaming platforms and went viral on social media—to say that the album was "reshaping the music industry" and landing "lucrative" licensing deals for usage in motion pictures. Steele opined that the re-recorded album's success influenced Republic Records' parent company Universal Music Group to implement stricter terms in recording deals by doubling the time before an artist can re-record their music, but they also increased royalty payments to artists following their demands for better revenue shares. Variety named Swift the "Queen of Stream" after the album broke streaming records, and Rolling Stone India opined that "it's no small feat" for a re-released album to score a number-one song.

Various publications considered Red (Taylor's Version) one of the biggest popular culture and music moments of 2021. The Recording Academy deemed it a defining factor for pop music within the year. Ms. and Slate opined that Red (Taylor's Version) ushered in a critical reevaluation for the original Red, as the initial reviews were influenced by the sexist scrutiny on Swift's image and dating life. Billboard named Swift the "Greatest Pop Star of 2021", and she was the highest-paid musician of 2021 globally.

== Track listing ==
All tracks are written by Taylor Swift, except where noted.

Red (Taylor's Version) track listing
No.	Title	Writer(s)	Producer(s)	Length
1.	"State of Grace"		Swift; Christopher Rowe	4:55
2.	"Red"		Swift; Rowe	3:43
3.	"Treacherous"	Swift; Dan Wilson	Wilson	4:02
4.	"I Knew You Were Trouble"	Swift; Max Martin; Shellback	Swift; Rowe; Shellback	3:39
5.	"All Too Well"	Swift; Liz Rose	Swift; Rowe	5:29
6.	"22"	Swift; Martin; Shellback	Swift; Rowe; Shellback	3:50
7.	"I Almost Do"		Swift; Rowe	4:04
8.	"We Are Never Ever Getting Back Together"	Swift; Martin; Shellback	Swift; Rowe; Shellback	3:13
9.	"Stay Stay Stay"		Swift; Rowe	3:25
10.	"The Last Time" (featuring Gary Lightbody of Snow Patrol)	Swift; Lightbody; Jacknife Lee	Lee	4:59
11.	"Holy Ground"		Jeff Bhasker	3:22
12.	"Sad Beautiful Tragic"		Swift; Rowe; Paul Mirkovich^{[a]}	4:44
13.	"The Lucky One"		Bhasker	4:00
14.	"Everything Has Changed" (featuring Ed Sheeran)	Swift; Sheeran	Butch Walker	4:05
15.	"Starlight"		Swift; Rowe; Mirkovich^{[a]}	3:40
16.	"Begin Again"		Swift; Rowe	3:58
17.	"The Moment I Knew"		Swift; Rowe; Mirkovich^{[a]}	4:45
18.	"Come Back... Be Here"	Swift; Wilson	Wilson	3:43
19.	"Girl at Home"		Elvira Anderfjärd	3:40
20.	"State of Grace" (acoustic version)		Swift; Rowe	5:21
21.	"Ronan"	Swift; Maya Thompson	Swift; Rowe	4:24
22.	"Better Man"		Swift; Aaron Dessner	4:57
23.	"Nothing New" (featuring Phoebe Bridgers)		Swift; Dessner; Tony Berg^{[b]}	4:18
24.	"Babe"	Swift; Patrick Monahan	Swift; Jack Antonoff	3:44
25.	"Message in a Bottle"	Swift; Martin; Shellback	Anderfjärd; Shellback	3:45
26.	"I Bet You Think About Me" (featuring Chris Stapleton)	Swift; Lori McKenna	Swift; Dessner	4:45
27.	"Forever Winter"	Swift; Mark Foster	Swift; Antonoff	4:23
28.	"Run" (featuring Ed Sheeran)	Swift; Sheeran	Swift; Dessner	4:00
29.	"The Very First Night"	Swift; Amund Bjørklund; Espen Lind	Espionage; Tim Blacksmith^{[a]}; D Mob^{[a]}	3:20
30.	"All Too Well (10 Minute Version)"	Swift; Rose	Swift; Antonoff	10:13
Total length:				130:26

=== Notes ===
- ^{^[a]} signifies executive producer
- ^{^[b]} signifies vocal producer
- All tracks on the standard edition are noted as "Taylor's Version"; tracks 22–30 are additionally noted as "From the Vault".
- The album's CD package consists of two discs; one containing tracks 1–16, and the other with tracks 17–30.

== Personnel ==
=== Musicians ===
- Taylor Swift – vocals, background vocals (1–4, 6–9, 11–15, 17, 18)
- Amos Heller – bass guitar (1, 2, 4–9, 16, 20), synth bass (5, 6, 8), clapping (9)
- Matt Billingslea – drums, percussion (1, 2, 4–9, 16, 20, 21); vibraphone (1), drum programming (4, 6, 8), clapping (9)
- Max Bernstein – electric guitar (1, 2, 4, 9), synthesizer (4–6, 8, 9, 16, 20), acoustic guitar (7), steel guitar (16)
- Mike Meadows – electric guitar (1), synthesizer (1, 2, 4, 6, 8), Hammond B3 (2, 16), acoustic guitar (4–9, 11, 13, 16, 20), background vocals (5, 9), clapping (9), mandolin (9, 16), piano (21)
- Paul Sidoti – electric guitar (1, 2, 4–6, 8, 9, 16, 21), acoustic guitar (7), piano (20)
- Jonathan Yudkin – strings (1, 2, 17), bouzouki (2), violin (16)
- David Cook – piano (2, 5, 16)
- Dan Wilson – bass, guitar (3, 18); background vocals (3)
- Aaron Sterling – drums, percussion, programming (3, 18)
- Andy Thompson – electric guitar (3), keyboards (3, 18), bass, conductor, synth bass (18)
- Sara Mulford – piano (3, 18), synthesizer (18)
- Dan Burns – programming (4, 6, 8)
- Jacknife Lee – bass, guitar, keyboards, piano (10)
- Davide Rossi – string arrangement, cello, viola, violin (10)
- Matt Bishop – drums (10)
- Gary Lightbody – vocals, guitar (10); background vocals (14)
- Owen Pallett – string arrangement (10)
- Bebel Matsumiya – background vocals (11, 13)
- Jeff Bhasker – background vocals, synthesizer (11, 13)
- Ian Gold – drum programming (11, 13)
- Anders Mouridsen – electric guitar (11, 13)
- Alexander Sasha Krivtsov – acoustic bass guitar (12, 17), electric bass (15)
- Justin Derrico – acoustic guitar (12, 15, 17), bouzouki, electric guitar (15); ukulele (17)
- Nate Morton – drums (12, 15, 17), drum programming (15)
- Paul Mirkovich – piano, synthesizer (12, 15, 17); synth bass (12, 17), drum programming (15, 17)
- Ed Sheeran – vocals, acoustic guitar (14, 28); background vocals (14)
- Butch Walker – background vocals, bass, drums, guitar, keyboards, percussion (14)
- Pete Amato – drum programming (15)
- Charlie Judge – accordion (16)
- Caitlin Evanson – background vocals (16, 22)
- Liz Huett – background vocals (17, 22)
- Dan Lawonn – cello (18)
- Kirsten Whitson – cello (18)
- Ruth Marshall – cello (18)
- Charlie Block – double bass (18)
- David Campbell – string arrangement (18)
- Sam Bergman – viola (18)
- Valerie Little – viola (18)
- Allison Ostrander – violin (18)
- Conor O'Brien – violin (18)
- Erika Hoogeveen – violin (18)
- Felicity James – violin (18)
- Huldah Niles – violin (18)
- Kate Bennett – violin (18)
- Mary Alice Hutton – violin (18)
- Natalia Moiseeva – violin (18)
- Natsuki Kumagai – violin (18)
- Troy Gardner – violin (18)
- Elvira Anderfjärd – background vocals, bass, drums, keyboards, programming (19, 25)
- Aaron Dessner – acoustic guitar, bass guitar, electric guitar, keyboards, piano (22, 23, 26); synthesizer (22, 23, 28), drum programming (22, 28)
- Josh Kaufman – electric guitar (22, 26, 28), lap steel guitar (22, 26), acoustic guitar, mandolin (22); harmonica (26)
- London Contemporary Orchestra – orchestra (22, 26, 28)
  - Galya Bisengalieva – orchestra leader, violin
  - Robert Ames – conductor
  - Jonny Byers, Max Ruisi, Oliver Coates – cello
  - Dave Brown – double bass
  - Clifton Harrison, Matthew Kettle, Stephanie Edmundson, Zoe Matthews – viola
  - Anna Ovsyanikova, Anna de Bruin, Antonia Kesel, Charis Jenson, Charlotte Reid, Eloisa-Fleur Thorn, Guy Button, Natalie Klouda, Nicole Crespo O'Donoghue, Nicole Stokes, Zara Benyounes – violin
- James Krivchenia – drums, percussion (22, 26, 28)
- Clarice Jensen – cello (23)
- Yuki Numata Resnick – violin (23)
- Phoebe Bridgers – vocals (23)
- Jack Antonoff – acoustic guitar, bass, electric guitar, keyboards (24, 27, 30); Mellotron, percussion, programming (24, 27, 30); drums (24, 27), 12-string acoustic guitar (27), slide guitar (30)
- Mikey Freedom Hart – acoustic guitar (24), celesta, Hammond B3 (24, 30); electric guitar, slide guitar, synthesizer (24, 27); bass, pedal steel (27); baritone guitar, organ (30), piano, Wurlitzer organ (30)
- Sean Hutchinson – drums, percussion (24, 27, 30)
- Evan Smith – flute, saxophone (24, 27, 30); synthesizer (30)
- Michael Riddleberger – percussion (24, 27, 30)
- Cole Kamen-Green – trumpet (24, 27)
- Shellback – guitar, keyboards, programming (25)
- Chris Stapleton – vocals (26)
- Mark Foster – background vocals (27)
- Thomas Bartlett – keyboards, synthesizer (28)
- Espen Lind – bass (29)
- Freddy Holm – dobro, guitar, keyboards (29)
- Torstein Lofthus – drums (29)
- Amund Bjørklund – keyboards (29)
- Bobby Hawk – strings (30)

=== Technical ===
- Taylor Swift – executive producer
- Randy Merrill – mastering
- Şerban Ghenea – mixing (1–21, 24, 25, 27, 29, 30)
- Jonathan Low – mixing, recording (22, 23, 25, 28, 30); engineering (23, 28)
- Bryce Bordone – mix engineering (1–9, 11–21, 24, 25, 27), mixing assistance (10, 29)
- Derek Garten – engineering, editing (1, 2, 4–7, 9, 12, 15–17, 20, 21); vocal engineering (22)
- John Hanes – engineering (10, 29)
- Ian Gold – engineering (11, 13)
- Aaron Dessner – engineering (23, 28), recording (22, 23)
- Bella Blasko – engineering, recording (23, 28)
- Will Maclellan – engineering (23, 28)
- Cole Kamen-Green – engineering (24, 27)
- David Hart – engineering (24, 27, 30)
- Evan Smith – engineering (24, 27, 30)
- Jack Antonoff – engineering, recording (24, 27, 30)
- John Rooney – engineering, engineering assistance (24, 27, 30)
- Laura Sisk – engineering, recording (24, 27, 30)
- Michael Riddleberger – engineering (24, 27, 30)
- Mikey Freedom Hart – engineering (24, 27, 30)
- Sean Hutchinson – engineering (24, 27, 30)
- Jon Gautier – engineering (30)
- David Payne – recording (1, 2, 5, 7, 16, 20, 21)
- Aaron Sterling – recording (3, 18)
- Andy Thompson – recording (3, 18)
- John Mark Nelson – recording (3, 18)
- Sara Mulford – recording (3, 18)
- Jacknife Lee – recording (10)
- Matt Bishop – recording, editing (10)
- Travis Ference – recording, additional engineering (12, 15, 17); editing (15)
- Butch Walker – recording (14)
- Justin Derrico – recording (15), additional engineering (12, 15, 17)
- Miles Hanson – recording (18)
- Elvira Anderfjärd – recording (19)
- Jeremy Murphy – recording (22, 28)
- Espen Lind – recording (29)
- Mike Hartung – recording (29)
- Christopher Rowe – vocal engineering
- Sam Holland – vocal engineering (4, 8)
- Robert Sellens – vocal engineering (14, 28)
- Tony Berg – vocal production (23)
- Austin Brown – editing, engineering assistance (1, 2, 5, 7, 9, 16, 20, 21)
- Dan Burns – additional engineering (1, 2, 4, 5, 7–9, 16, 20, 21)
- Paul Mirkovich – additional engineering (12, 15, 17)
- Pete Amato – additional engineering (15)
- Daniel Ficca – additional engineering (18)
- Josh Kaufman – additional engineering (26)
- Jeff Fitzpatrick – engineering assistance (17)
- Jon Sher – engineering assistance (24, 27, 30)
- Lauren Marquez – engineering assistance (24, 27, 30)
- Michael Fahey – engineering assistance (26)

== Charts ==
=== Weekly charts ===
2021–2022 weekly chart performance
Chart (2021–2022)	Peak position
Argentine Albums (CAPIF)	1
Australian Albums (ARIA)	1
Australian Country Albums (ARIA)	1
Belgian Albums (Ultratop Flanders)	3
Belgian Albums (Ultratop Wallonia)	5
Canadian Albums (Billboard)	1
Croatian International Albums (HDU)	4
Czech Albums (ČNS IFPI)	32
Danish Albums (Hitlisten)	3
Dutch Albums (Album Top 100)	3
Finnish Albums (Suomen virallinen lista)	6
French Albums (SNEP)	10
Hungarian Albums (MAHASZ)	27
Icelandic Albums (Tónlistinn)	4
Irish Albums (Official Charts)	1
Italian Albums (FIMI)	8
Japanese Albums (Oricon)	15
Japanese Hot Albums (Billboard Japan)	16
Lithuanian Albums (AGATA)	4
New Zealand Albums (RMNZ)	1
Norwegian Albums (VG-lista)	1
Portuguese Albums (AFP)	4
Scottish Albums (Official Charts)	1
Spanish Albums (Promusicae)	3
Swedish Albums (Sverigetopplistan)	8
UK Albums (Official Charts)	1
US Billboard 200	1
US Top Country Albums (Billboard)	1

2023–2024 weekly chart performance
Chart (2023–2024) (Note: After Red (Taylor's Version) was released in 2021, the original Red appeared on the Austrian and German charts with statistics combined with the re-recording. The re-recording was separated into its own chart history in November 2023.)	Peak position
Austrian Albums (Ö3 Austria)	47
German Albums (Offizielle Top 100)	22

=== Year-end charts ===
2021 year-end charts
Chart (2021)	Position
Australian Albums (ARIA)	19
Belgian Albums (Ultratop Flanders)	96
Dutch Albums (Album Top 100)	75
Irish Albums (IRMA)	37
New Zealand Albums (RMNZ)	39
Portuguese Albums (AFP)	49
Spanish Albums (PROMUSICAE)	75
UK Albums (OCC)	32

2022 year-end charts
Chart (2022)	Position
Australian Albums (ARIA)	23
Belgian Albums (Ultratop Flanders)	56
Canadian Albums (Billboard)	5
New Zealand Albums (RMNZ)	26
Portuguese Albums (AFP)	24
Spanish Albums (PROMUSICAE)	58
UK Albums (OCC)	52
US Billboard 200	5
US Top Country Albums (Billboard)	2

2023 year-end charts
Chart (2023)	Position
Australian Albums (ARIA)	29
Belgian Albums (Ultratop Flanders)	55
Canadian Albums (Billboard)	26
Dutch Albums (Album Top 100)	67
New Zealand Albums (RMNZ)	49
Portuguese Albums (AFP)	43
Spanish Albums (PROMUSICAE)	62
UK Albums (OCC)	51
US Billboard 200	17
US Top Country Albums (Billboard)	5

2024 year-end charts
Chart (2024)	Position
Australian Albums (ARIA)	29
Australian Country Albums (ARIA)	3
Belgian Albums (Ultratop Flanders)	57
Canadian Albums (Billboard)	34
Dutch Albums (Album Top 100)	92
Portuguese Albums (AFP)	49
Spanish Albums (PROMUSICAE)	87
UK Albums (OCC)	63
US Billboard 200	32
US Top Country Albums (Billboard)	8

2025 year-end charts
Chart (2025)	Position
Belgian Albums (Ultratop Flanders)	159
US Billboard 200	100
US Top Country Albums (Billboard)	19

== Certifications ==
Certifications
Region	Certification	Certified units/sales
Australia (ARIA)	2× Platinum	140,000^{‡}
Austria (IFPI Austria)	Platinum	15,000^{‡}
Brazil (Pro-Música Brasil)	3× Platinum	120,000^{‡}
Canada (Music Canada)	4× Platinum	320,000^{‡}
Denmark (IFPI Danmark)	Platinum	20,000^{‡}
France (SNEP)	Platinum	100,000^{‡}
Italy (FIMI)	Platinum	50,000^{‡}
New Zealand (RMNZ)	3× Platinum	45,000^{‡}
Poland (ZPAV)	Platinum	20,000^{‡}
Portugal (AFP)	Gold	3,500^{‡}
Spain (Promusicae)	Gold	20,000^{‡}
United Kingdom (BPI)	Platinum	300,000^{‡}
United States (RIAA)	6× Platinum	6,000,000^{‡}
^{‡} Sales+streaming figures based on certification alone.

== See also ==
- List of Billboard 200 number-one albums of 2021
- List of UK Albums Chart number ones of the 2020s
- List of UK Album Downloads Chart number ones of the 2020s
- List of number-one albums of 2021 (Australia)
- List of number-one albums of 2021 (Canada)
- List of number-one albums of 2021 (Ireland)
- List of number-one albums from the 2020s (New Zealand)
- List of number-one albums in Norway
