= Begin Again (Taylor Swift song) =

2012 single by Taylor Swift

Single by Taylor Swift

from the album Red
- Written: 2011
- Released: October 1, 2012
- Studio: Blackbird (Nashville, Tennessee)
- Genre: Country; folk-pop; soft rock
- Length: 3:57
- Label: Big Machine
- Songwriter: Taylor Swift
- Producers: Taylor Swift; Dann Huff; Nathan Chapman

Taylor Swift singles chronology
"Ronan" (2012)	"Begin Again" (2012)	"I Knew You Were Trouble" (2012)

Music video
- "Begin Again" on YouTube

"Begin Again" is a song written and recorded by the American singer-songwriter Taylor Swift for her fourth studio album, Red (2012). It was released as the second single from Red on October 1, 2012, by Big Machine Records. Produced by Swift, Dann Huff, and Nathan Chapman, "Begin Again" is a gentle country, folk-pop, and soft rock ballad with arpeggiated acoustic guitar, steel guitar, and percussion. Its lyrics detail falling in love again after going through heartbreak.

Music critics praised the gentle production and the narrative songwriting, with some welcoming Swift's mature perspective on love. "Begin Again" was nominated for Best Country Song at the 56th Annual Grammy Awards in 2014. In the United States, the single peaked at number seven on the Billboard Hot 100 and number three on Country Airplay, and it was certified platinum by the Recording Industry Association of America. It peaked at number four on the Canadian Hot 100 and received certifications in Australia, Brazil, and Canada.

The song's accompanying music video was directed by Philip Andelman. Shot in Paris, France, the video depicts Swift strolling around the city with a male love interest. Swift performed "Begin Again" live at the 2012 Country Music Association Awards and on the Red Tour (2013–2014). She also sang it on certain dates of her Reputation Tour in 2018 and the Eras Tour in 2023–2024. Following the 2019 dispute regarding the ownership of Swift's back catalog, she re-recorded the song as "Begin Again (Taylor's Version)" for her re-recorded album Red (Taylor's Version) (2021).

== Background and release ==
Taylor Swift designated her fourth studio album, Red, as a breakup album that was inspired by a particularly intense relationship she had experienced. She wrote "Begin Again" in 2011, and the track was produced for Red by Swift, Nathan Chapman, and Dann Huff. "Begin Again" was recorded by Steve Marcantonio and mixed by Justin Niebank, with assistance from Drew Bollman, at Blackbird Studio, Nashville. Hank Williams mastered the track at Nashville's MasterMix studio.

Swift previewed "Begin Again" on Good Morning America on September 24, 2012, and Big Machine Records released it for download onto iTunes the next day. "Begin Again" was one of the four promotional singles that preceded the release of Red, and it was later released to country radio in the United States on October 1, 2012, as the album's second single by Big Machine. An individually numbered CD single was released on October 23, 2012, to Amazon.com and Swift's official store.

== Composition and lyrics ==
"Begin Again" (2012)
"Begin Again" is a country, folk-pop, and soft rock ballad driven by arpeggiated acoustic guitar and steel guitar.

At 3 minutes and 57 seconds long, "Begin Again" is a country, folk-pop, and soft rock ballad. Set over a tempo of 79 beats per minute, the arrangement is driven by arpeggiated acoustic guitar, mandolin, violin, accordion, and gentle percussion in its production. The drums are initially brushed, and as the song progresses, they are replaced by sticks to increase the intensity. The production builds up with an orchestration of loose chords played on electric guitar, deep bass, pedal steel guitar, and subtle synth accentuations.

Marc Hogan from Spin opined that the instruments evoked to the music of the 1970s soft-rock singer-songwriters Joni Mitchell and James Taylor, the latter of whom is referenced to in the lyrics, "You said you never met one girl who had as many James Taylor records as you/ But I do." This idea was corroborated by the music writers Damien Somville and Marine Benoit, who described the influence as Taylor's 1970s "folk soft rock". For the music critic Annie Zaleski, "Begin Again" is stylistically reminiscent of the songs by Taylor and Kris Kristofferson, whom Swift cited as her influences. Lindsay Zoladz from The New York Times found the song to feature a "coffee shop folksiness". The musicologist James E. Perone believed that the song's production confirms the significance of Swift's country roots on the genre-spanning, pop-oriented Red.

The lyrics of "Begin Again" are about a protagonist falling in love again after a failed relationship. During the premiere of the song on Good Morning America, Swift said that the track is about the vulnerability of going on a first date after having gone through a breakup. While the breakup left the narrator feeling like "all love ever does is break and burn and end", upon going on this first date after eight months since her last relationship, she sees this new man as more compassionate, understanding, and caring about her interests: "I think it's strange that you think I'm funny, because he never did." While the connection seems promising, the song does not come to a conclusion about how this relationship will end up. In an interview with the Los Angeles Times, Swift said that she placed "Begin Again" last on Red's track listing and "State of Grace" first because they were both influenced by the same person, who also inspired other tracks. She added that "Begin Again" was the last track she wrote about her relationship with this person.

Billy Dukes from Taste of Country remarked that the narrator of "Begin Again" is willing to reveal her vulnerability to the new lover, which makes the song touching. The placement of "Begin Again" as the final track on the standard edition of Red received analysis—Perone wrote that the track served as the thematic conclusion to the album. Noting the tracks of Red were centered on the emotional intensity of the narrator after exploring a newfound relationship—followed through stages of heartbreak and "red" tumultuous feelings from a toxic breakup—he settled that the track focused on a relationship that is deeper and potentially more lasting.

== Critical reception ==
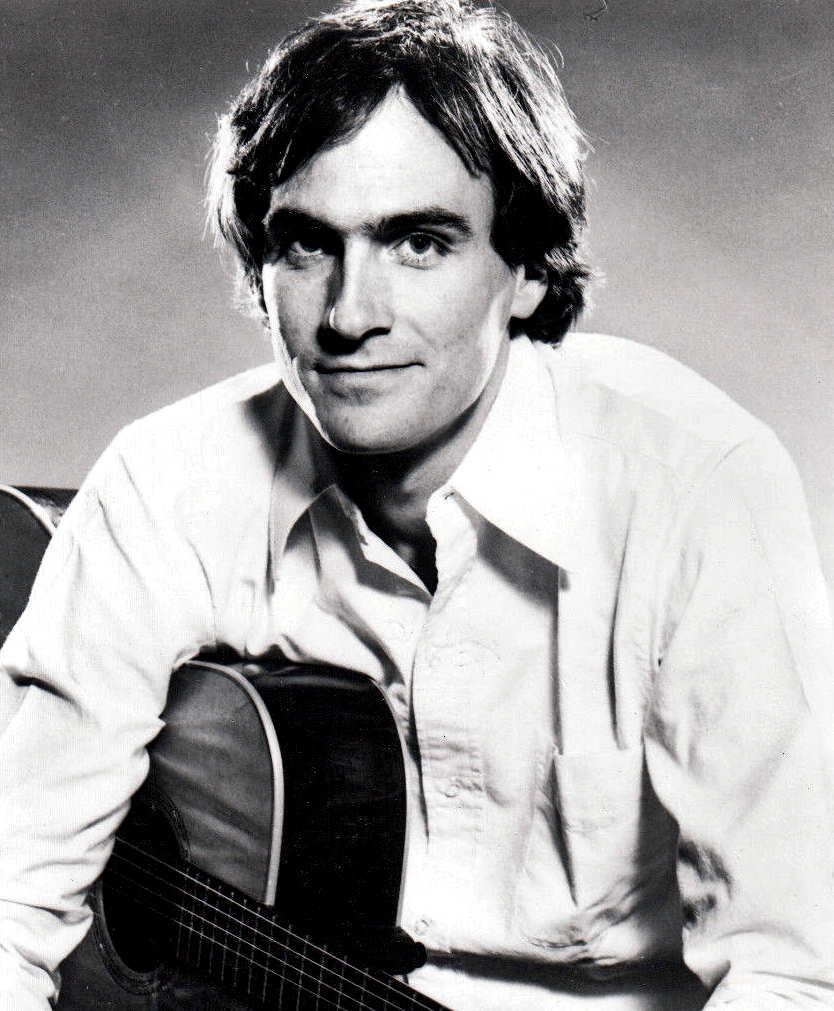
Several critics compared "Begin Again" to the music of James Taylor (pictured), who is referenced in the lyrics.

Critical reception of "Begin Again" was generally positive. Several critics praised Swift's narrative songwriting. Perone regarded the lyrics as "wide-ranging and free-ranging" and deemed the track an appropriate album closer for Red. Giving the song four stars out of five, Dukes described it as "a cleansing breath" that catered well to Swift's country fans after the pop lead single "We Are Never Ever Getting Back Together". Grady Smith of Entertainment Weekly lauded Swift's writing for "taking a single moment in time and letting it unfold like a pop-up storybook". Writing for NPR, J. English commented that the optimistic sentiments of "Begin Again" were one of the messy and complicated emotions of early womanhood explored in Red, which made the album compelling. Nathan Wisnicki of PopMatters had mixed opinions about the James Taylor reference, but he contended that the song's narrative was one of the examples for the earnest and sharp sentiments coming directly from the singer's lived experiences.

Other critics commented on the country sound of "Begin Again" in the context of the genre-spanning album Red. The A.V. Club's Michael Gallucci picked it among the album's best tracks, alongside "We Are Never Ever Getting Back Together" and "Red", because they "bridge where Swift has been and where she’s going". Billboard described Swift's vocals as "breathy, girlish" and wrote that the track ended the album "on a memorable, hopeful note". The magazine ranked "Begin Again" at number six on their list of the best songs of 2012, describing it as restrained that showcased a newfound maturity for Swift. The song was nominated for Best Country Song at the 56th Annual Grammy Awards in 2014.

Retrospective reviews of "Begin Again" have been generally positive. Alexis Petridis of The Guardian placed the single at number 20 out of Swift's 44 singles up to that point, writing that the "keenly observed lyrical details" were better than anything on her previous album Speak Now. Rob Sheffield from Rolling Stone ranked the song 52nd out of Swift's 286 songs, calling the track "a deceptively simple ballad that sneaks up and steamrolls all over you". The Times placed the song at number five in their 2024 list of the 20 best songs by Swift, praising the detailed songwriting and acoustic production. Vulture's Nate Jones put it at number 32 out of 245 songs in Swift's catalog, highlighting its earnestness and commenting that its placement as an album closer set the precedent to Swift's album closers being gentle ballads on her later albums 1989, Reputation, and Lover.

== Commercial performance ==
In the United States, "Begin Again" debuted at number one on the Hot Digital Songs chart with first-week sales of 299,000 digital copies; it was Swift's fifth chart topper. On the Billboard Hot 100 chart dated October 4, 2012, it debuted and peaked at number seven, becoming Swift's 12th top-10 entry and her ninth top-10 debut.

On the Hot Country Songs chart dated October 13, 2012, "Begin Again" opened at number 37, with first-week three million airplay impressions. For the next week's issue, Billboard incorporated digital sales and streaming data to the Hot Country Songs chart, in addition to only airplay data as previously done. As such, the airplay-only chart became Country Airplay. "Begin Again" appeared at number 29 on the newly revamped Country Airplay and peaked at number three, spending 22 weeks charting. On the multi-metric Hot Country Songs chart, the single peaked at number 10. On March 29, 2013, the song was certified platinum by the Recording Industry Association of America in recognition of one million digital sales.

In Canada, "Begin Again" reached number four on the Canadian Hot 100 and number seven on the Canada Country airplay chart and received a gold certification from Music Canada. Elsewhere, the song debuted on the charts in several territories, peaking within the top 40 of New Zealand (11), Australia (20), Ireland (25), Scotland (27), the United Kingdom (30), and Spain (35), and Italy (72). The single was certified platinum in Australia, and gold in Brazil and New Zealand.

== Music video and live performances ==
The music video for "Begin Again" premiered on MTV on October 23, 2012. Swift chose to film the video in Paris as a "love letter" in tribute to the city, "'Cause it's just the city and this storyline of somebody moving on and finding yourself again." Directed by Philip Andelman, the video starts with Swift standing on a bridge while pensively gazing across the water. She then takes a walk along the Seine and sketches the Eiffel Tower at a cafe, where she encounters a photographer. The two spend time together, bicycling and walking through the streets of Paris.

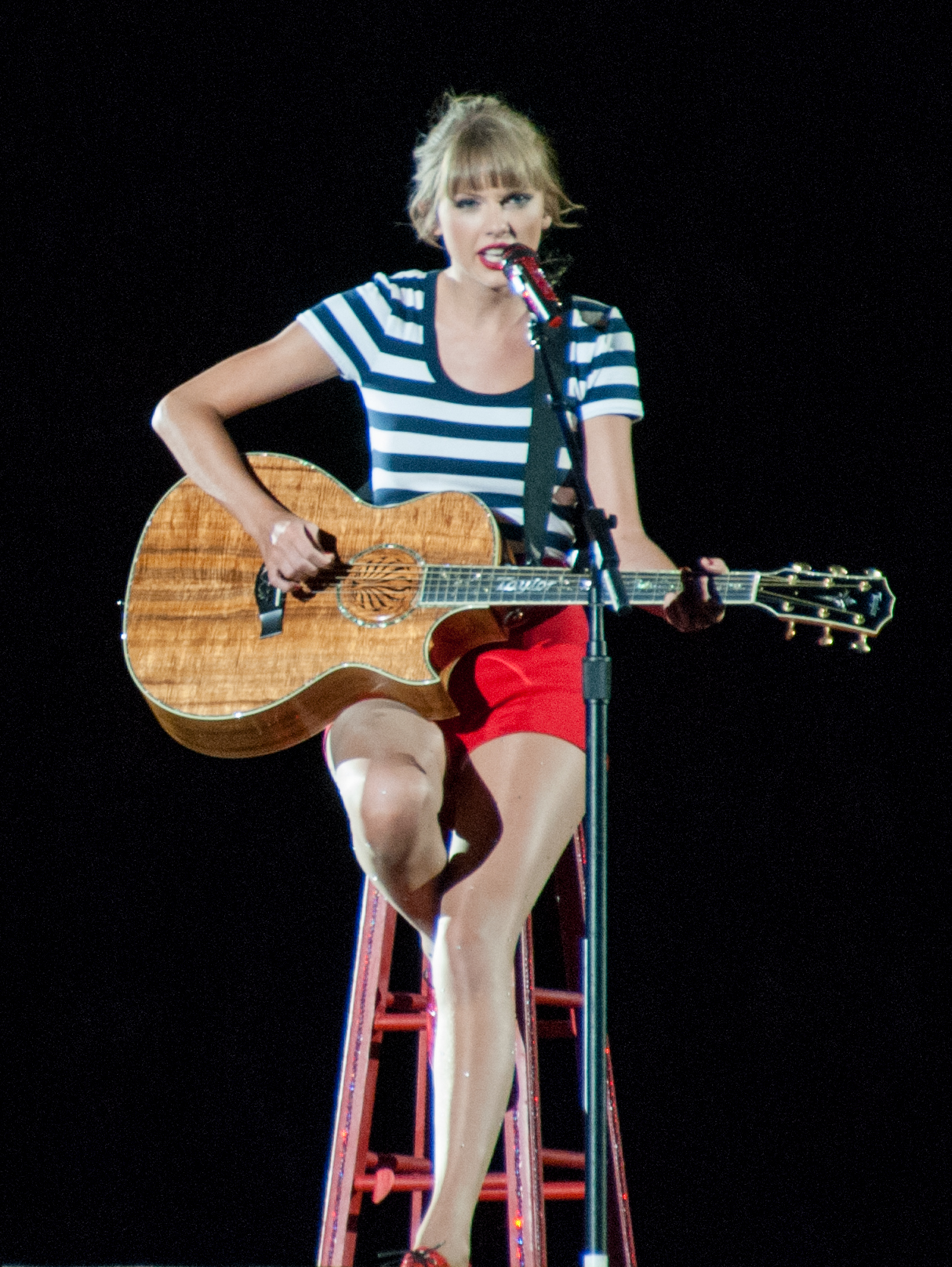
Swift performing "Begin Again" on the Red Tour (2013)

The video's Parisian setting was compared by critics to that of Adele's music video for "Someone like You" (2011). Entertainment Weekly said that the video for "Begin Again" was "lovely [...] but a little bit sleepy" and opined that it recalled Swift's "Back to December" — "is it the color palette, or just the general moodiness?" The video was nominated for Video of the Year at the 2013 American Country Awards and Female Video of the Year at the 2013 CMT Music Awards.

Swift first performed "Begin Again" at the 2012 Country Music Association Awards in Nashville. The performance featured Swift, in a red dress, singing on a Parisian café-inspired stage with an accordion player. Writing for Entertainment Weekly, Grady Smith believed Swift did not showcase a powerful voice like other country artists, but found Swift's tone "gently evocative and rather soothing" in the right place. She also performed the song on The Ellen DeGeneres Show and Late Show with David Letterman in 2012. The song was part of Swift's set list for an episode of VH1 Storytellers, filmed at Harvey Mudd College in October 2012.

On the Red Tour (2013–2014), Swift performed "Begin Again" as part of an acoustic set on the B-stage. At the August 31, 2018, concert in Minneapolis, as part of her Reputation Stadium Tour, she sang "Begin Again" on acoustic guitar as a "surprise song". Swift again performed an acoustic guitar rendition at the April 23, 2023, concert in Houston; and a piano mashup with her song "Paris" at the May 12, 2024, concert in Paris, France, as part of the Eras Tour.

== Credits and personnel ==
Adapted from the liner notes of Red

- Taylor Swift – lead vocals, writer, producer
- Dann Huff – producer, electric guitar, digital editing, acoustic guitar
- Nathan Chapman – producer, acoustic guitar, high string acoustic guitar
- Steve Marcantonio – recording
- Seth Morton – assistant recording
- Justin Niebank – mixing
- Drew Bollman – assistant mixing
- Mike "Frog" Griffith – production coordinator
- Jason Campbell – production coordinator
- Tom Bukovac – electric guitar
- Paul Franklin – steel guitar
- Ilya Toshinsky – mandolin
- Jimmie Lee Sloas – bass
- Jonathan Yudkin – violin, string
- Charlie Judge – Hammond B3, synthesizers, strings, accordion, piano
- Aaron Sterling – drums
- Caitlin Evanson – background vocals

== Charts ==
=== Weekly charts ===
Weekly chart performance for "Begin Again"
Chart (2012–2013)	Peak position
Australia (ARIA)	20
Canada Hot 100 (Billboard)	4
Canada Country (Billboard)	7
Ireland (IRMA)	25
Italy (FIMI)	72
New Zealand (Recorded Music NZ)	11
Scottish Singles Sales (Official Charts)	27
Spain (Promusicae)	35
UK Singles (Official Charts)	30
US Billboard Hot 100	7
US Hot Country Songs (Billboard)	10
US Country Airplay (Billboard)	3

=== Year-end charts ===
2012 year-end chart for "Begin Again"
Chart (2012)	Position
US Hot Country Songs (Billboard)	100

2013 year-end charts for "Begin Again"
Chart (2013)	Position
US Country Airplay (Billboard)	48
US Hot Country Songs (Billboard)	57

== Certifications ==
Certifications for "Begin Again"
Region	Certification	Certified units/sales
Australia (ARIA)	Platinum	70,000^{‡}
Brazil (Pro-Música Brasil)	Gold	30,000^{‡}
Canada (Music Canada)	Gold	40,000^{*}
New Zealand (RMNZ)	Gold	15,000^{‡}
United States (RIAA)	Platinum	1,000,000^{*}
^{*} Sales figures based on certification alone.^{‡} Sales+streaming figures based on certification alone.

== "Begin Again (Taylor's Version)" ==
"Begin Again (Taylor's Version)"

Song by Taylor Swift

from the album Red (Taylor's Version)
- Released: November 12, 2021
- Studio: Black Bird (Nashville)
- Length: 4:00
- Label: Republic
- Songwriter: Taylor Swift
- Producers: Taylor Swift; Christopher Rowe

Lyric video
- "Begin Again (Taylor's Version)" on YouTube

After signing a new contract with Republic Records, Swift began re-recording her first six studio albums in November 2020. The decision came after the public 2019 dispute between Swift and the talent manager Scooter Braun, who acquired Big Machine Records, including the masters of Swift's albums the label had released. By re-recording them, Swift had full ownership of the new masters, including the copyright licensing of her songs, devaluing the Big Machine-owned masters. The re-recording of "Begin Again", subtitled "(Taylor's Version)", was released as part of Red's re-recording, Red (Taylor's Version), on November 12, 2021.

"Begin Again (Taylor's Version)" was produced by Swift and Christopher Rowe, and it was recorded by David Payne at Blackbird Studios, Nashville. Rowe recorded Swift's vocals at Kitty Committee Studio in Belfast, Northern Ireland, and Serban Ghenea mixed both tracks at MixStar Studios, Virginia Beach, Virginia. Slant Magazine's Jonathan Keefe complimented the re-recorded track for showcasing a stronger country production and an improved in Swift's musical instincts, "heightening its plainspoken candor and hopefulness". Sheffield complimented Swift's matured vocals, writing that it was "poignant to hear her thirty-something voice" revisiting the "fragile optimism" of the track. For Anna Leszkiewicz of the New Statesman, the "warm harmonies" are more prominent on the re-recording.

"Begin Again (Taylor's Version)" peaked at number 76 on the Billboard Global 200 and number 61 on the Canadian Hot 100. In the United States, the track peaked at number 77 on the Billboard Hot 100 and number 25 on Hot Country Songs.

=== Personnel ===
Adapted from the liner notes of Red (Taylor's Version)

- Taylor Swift – lead vocals, songwriter, producer
- Christopher Rowe – producer, vocals engineer
- David Payne – recording engineer
- Dan Burns – additional engineer
- Austin Brown – assistant engineer, assistant editor
- Bryce Bordone – engineer
- Derek Garten – engineer
- Serban Ghenea – mixer
- Charles Judge – accordion
- Mike Meadows – acoustic guitar, Hammond organ, mandolin
- Amos Heller – bass guitar
- Matt Billingslea – drums
- Paul Sidoti – electric guitar
- David Cook – piano
- Max Bernstein – steel guitar, synths
- Jonathan Yudkin – violin
- Caitlin Evanson – background vocals

=== Charts ===
Weekly chart performance for "Begin Again (Taylor's Version)"
Chart (2021)	Peak position
Canada (Canadian Hot 100)	61
Global 200 (Billboard)	76
US Billboard Hot 100	77
US Hot Country Songs (Billboard)	25

== See also ==
- List of number-one digital songs of 2012 (U.S.)
