= Jolie & the Wanted (album) =

Studio album by Jolie & the Wanted
- Released: June 26, 2001
- Genre: Country
- Length: 41:21
- Label: DreamWorks Nashville
- Producer: Mark Bright; Dann Huff

Jolie & the Wanted the only album released country music group Jolie & the Wanted. It was released on June 26, 2001 via DreamWorks Nashville and was produced by Mark Bright and Dann Huff.

Released from the album were the singles "I Would", "Boom", "(When I Look in Your Eyes) I'm Beautiful", and "Party on the Patio". However, only the first two singles charted, where they both reached number 55 on the Billboard Hot Country Songs chart.

Bret Love of Allmusic gave the album two stars out of five, saying that Jolie's "sound has all the indicators of a pre-fabricated pop star[…]It's all fine if you're into that sort of thing, but the album is completely lacking in soul."

== Track listing ==
1. "Boom" (John Rotch, Shara Johnson) - 3:12
2. "I Would" (Brett James, Troy Verges) - 3:58
3. "Let It Go" (Stephony Smith, Jason Sellers) - 4:02
4. "I'm Beautiful" (Greg Barnhill, Holly Lamar, Jolie Edwards) - 4:21
5. "The Wantin' Not the Gettin'" (Al Anderson, Bob DiPiero, Jeffrey Steele) - 4:10
6. "Party on the Patio" (Craig Wiseman, Steele) - 4:55
7. "Wasted" (Anderson, Steele) - 3:54
8. "It's Only Love" (Bekka Bramlett, Steele) - 3:33
9. "You Make Me Feel Like a Woman" (Chris Lindsey, Aimee Mayo) - 3:35
10. "You Make Me" (Roxie Dean, Jamie O'Neal, Daryl Burgess) - 3:18
11. "I Go Crazy" (Paul Davis) - 4:21

== Personnel ==
- Tim Akers - keyboards
- Steve Brewster - drums
- Lisa Cochran - background vocals
- Eric Darken - percussion
- Jolie Edwards - lead vocals
- Paul Franklin - dobro, steel guitar
- Dann Huff - acoustic guitar, electric guitar
- Kirk "Jelly Roll" Johnson - harmonica
- Gordon Kennedy - electric guitar
- Chris McHugh - drums
- Jerry McPherson - electric guitar
- Gene Miller - background vocals
- Michael Rhodes - bass guitar
- Jackie Street - bass guitar
- Biff Watson - acoustic guitar
- John Willis - acoustic guitar
- Jonathan Yudkin - fiddle, mandolin
