= Jolie & the Wanted =

American country music band

- Origin: Omaha, Nebraska, U.S.
- Genres: Country
- Years active: 2000–2003
- Label: DreamWorks Nashville
- Past members: Jolie Edwards; Andy Hull; Steve King; Ethan Pilzer; Phil Symonds; Jonathan Trebing

Jolie & the Wanted was an American country music band composed of Jolie Edwards (lead vocals), Phil Symonds (guitar), Jonathan Trebing (guitar), Steve King (keyboards), Ethan Pilzer (bass guitar) and Andy Hull (drums). Signed to DreamWorks Records Nashville in 2000, the band released one studio album in 2001 and charted two singles on the Billboard Hot Country Songs charts. They split up in 2003.

== History ==
Jolie & the Wanted released one full studio album, and four singles to radio. The album, which was self-titled, was released on June 26, 2001, on DreamWorks Records Nashville division. It included the singles "I Would" and "Boom", both of which reached a peak of No. 55 on the Billboard Hot Country Singles & Tracks (now Hot Country Songs) charts.

In 2003, the group announced they would no longer be recording together. Edwards later signed to Warner Bros. Nashville but did not release anything. She would later release an independent album, Livin' Proof, in 2006. Ethan Pilzer joined the MuzikMafia, an association of singer-songwriters led by Big & Rich.

== Discography ==
=== Albums ===
Title	Album details
Jolie & the Wanted	Released: June 26, 2001; Label: DreamWorks Nashville
Livin' Proof (Jolie Edwards solo)	Released: 2004; Label: DGW Records

=== Singles ===
Year	Single	Peak positions	Album
Year	Single	US Country	Album
2000	"I Would"	55	Jolie & the Wanted
2001	"Boom"	55	Jolie & the Wanted
2001	"(When I Look In Your Eyes) I'm Beautiful"	—	Jolie & the Wanted
2001	"Party on the Patio"	—	Jolie & the Wanted
"—" denotes releases that did not chart

=== Music videos ===
Year	Video	Director
2000	"I Would"	
2001	"Boom"	David Abbott
