= Christopher Rowe (music producer) =

American record producer

Christopher Rowe is an American record producer, audio engineer and guitarist specializing in country rock. He is best known for his work with Taylor Swift.

== Career ==
Rowe began his career working as a guitarist on folk, new age, and ethnological records before moving into country music as an assistant engineer and editor. He was part of the production team for the Dixie Chicks album Fly.

Rowe has worked with Taylor Swift since 2011, as a sound mixer and engineer for her concert films Speak Now World Tour – Live (2011), The 1989 World Tour Live (2015), Reputation Stadium Tour (2018) and Folklore: The Long Pond Studio Sessions (2020).

Rowe played a more significant role in Swift's "Taylor's Version" album re-recording campaign, working as a producer and engineer on a majority of the tracks. These albums comprise Fearless (Taylor's Version) and Red (Taylor's Version) in 2021, and Speak Now (Taylor's Version) and 1989 (Taylor's Version) in 2023.

== Partial discography ==
Year	Album / Track	Artist	Role
1993	Human Rites	Douglas Spotted Eagle	electric guitar
1998	It Don't Get Any Better Than This	George Jones	assistant engineer
1998	I'm Alright	Jo Dee Messina	assistant engineer
1998	Faith	Faith Hill	assistant engineer
1999	Love Trip	Jerry Kilgore	mixing
1999	Fly	Dixie Chicks	engineer
2001	Step Right Up	Charlie Robison	engineer
2001	Say No More	Clay Walker	engineer, mixing, assistant engineer
2001	Jolie & the Wanted	Jolie & the Wanted	engineer
2002	No Shoes, No Shirt, No Problems	Kenny Chesney	editing
2002	Friday Night in Dixie	Rhett Akins	engineer, mixing
2003	Vicious Cycle	Lynyrd Skynyrd	engineer
2003	Keith Urban/The Ranch	Keith Urban and The Ranch	assistant engineer
2003	All I Want for Christmas Is a Real Good Tan	Kenny Chesney	engineer
2003	Across the Sky	Across the Sky	engineer
2004	The Kurt Carr Project: One Church	Kurt Carr	engineer
2004	Lyve: The Vicious Cycle Tour	Lynyrd Skynyrd	assistant engineer
2004	A Traditional Christmas	Joe Nichols	engineer
2005	Wide Open Spaces / Fly	Dixie Chicks	engineer, assistant
2005	The Road and the Radio	Kenny Chesney	engineer
2005	III	Joe Nichols	engineer
2006	The Dollar	Jamey Johnson	engineer
2006	Taylor Swift	Taylor Swift	remixing
2006	Peace, Love & Coondawgs	Cody McCarver	engineer
2007	Just Who I Am: Poets & Pirates	Kenny Chesney	engineer
2007	Cody McCarver	Cody McCarver	engineer
2008	Lucky Old Sun	Kenny Chesney	engineer
2009	Sara Smile	Jimmy Wayne	mixing
2009	Lullaby	Jewel	mixing
2009	Big Dreams & High Hopes	Jack Ingram	engineer, mixing
2013	Let It Snow: A Holiday Collection	Jewel	mixing
2013	In Time	The Mavericks	engineer, mixing
2016	Deep Tracks	Faith Hill	assistant engineer
2020	Twenty Years of Rascal Flatts: The Greatest Hits	Rascal Flatts	editing
2021	The Sonic Ranch	Midland	mixing
2021	Fearless (Taylor's Version)	Taylor Swift	producer, engineer, vocal engineer
2021	"Wildest Dreams (Taylor's Version)"	Taylor Swift	producer, engineer, vocal engineer
2021	Red (Taylor's Version)	Taylor Swift	producer, engineer, vocal engineer
2022	"This Love (Taylor's Version)"	Taylor Swift	producer, engineer, vocal engineer
2023	"If This Was A Movie (Taylor's Version)"	Taylor Swift	producer, engineer, vocal engineer
2023	"Eyes Open (Taylor's Version)"	Taylor Swift	producer, engineer, vocal engineer
2023	"Safe & Sound (Taylor's Version)"	Taylor Swift	producer, engineer, vocal engineer
2023	Speak Now (Taylor's Version)	Taylor Swift	producer, engineer, vocal engineer
2023	1989 (Taylor's Version)	Taylor Swift	producer, engineer, vocal engineer
2024	The Tortured Poets Department	Taylor Swift	vocal engineer
2025	The Life of a Showgirl	Taylor Swift	additional engineer
