= Starlight (Taylor Swift song) =

2012 song by Taylor Swift

Song by Taylor Swift

from the album Red
- Released: October 22, 2012
- Studio: Blackbird (Nashville)
- Genre: Dance-pop
- Length: 3:40
- Label: Big Machine
- Songwriter: Taylor Swift
- Producers: Taylor Swift; Nathan Chapman; Dann Huff

Audio video
- "Starlight" on YouTube

"Starlight (Taylor's Version)"

Song by Taylor Swift

from the album Red (Taylor's Version)
- Released: November 12, 2021
- Studio: Capitol (Hollywood)
- Length: 3:40
- Label: Republic
- Songwriter: Taylor Swift
- Producers: Taylor Swift; Christopher Rowe

Lyric video
- "Starlight (Taylor's Version)" on YouTube

"Starlight" is a song by the American singer-songwriter Taylor Swift for her fourth studio album, Red (2012). She was inspired to write the song by the teenage romance of Ethel Kennedy and Robert F. Kennedy: the lyrics narrate a summer romance in 1945 and depict two characters sneaking into a yacht club party. Produced by Swift, Nathan Chapman, and Dann Huff, "Starlight" is a dance-pop song with elements of country pop and trance music.

Music critics generally praised the narrative songwriting of "Starlight" and its catchy sound, although reviews have generally regarded it as a lesser entry in Swift's discography. Some critics remarked that the third-person perspective was a showcase of her expanding artistry beyond her usual autobiographical songs. "Starlight" peaked at number 80 on the Canadian Hot 100 and number 5 on the Bubbling Under Hot 100.

Swift used "Starlight" in a commercial for her fragrance in 2013. Following a 2019 dispute over Swift's back catalog, she re-recorded "Starlight" and released it as "Starlight (Taylor's Version)", as part of her 2021 re-recorded album Red (Taylor's Version). The re-recorded song peaked at number 102 on the Billboard Global 200 and charted in Canada and the United States.

== Background and release ==
Taylor Swift conceptualized her fourth studio album, Red (2012), as a breakup album that details the complex and conflicting feelings from a lost love, inspired by a real-life relationship of hers. She worked with new producers in addition to Nathan Chapman, who had produced her previous country pop albums. Swift, Chapman, and Dann Huff produced three songs for Red, including "Starlight", which was written by Swift alone. Big Machine Records released Red on October 22, 2012, and "Starlight" is number 15 on the standard track listing. Swift used "Starlight" as the soundtrack to a commercial for her fragrance "Taylor by Taylor Swift", which was available at Ulta Beauty stores, in 2013.

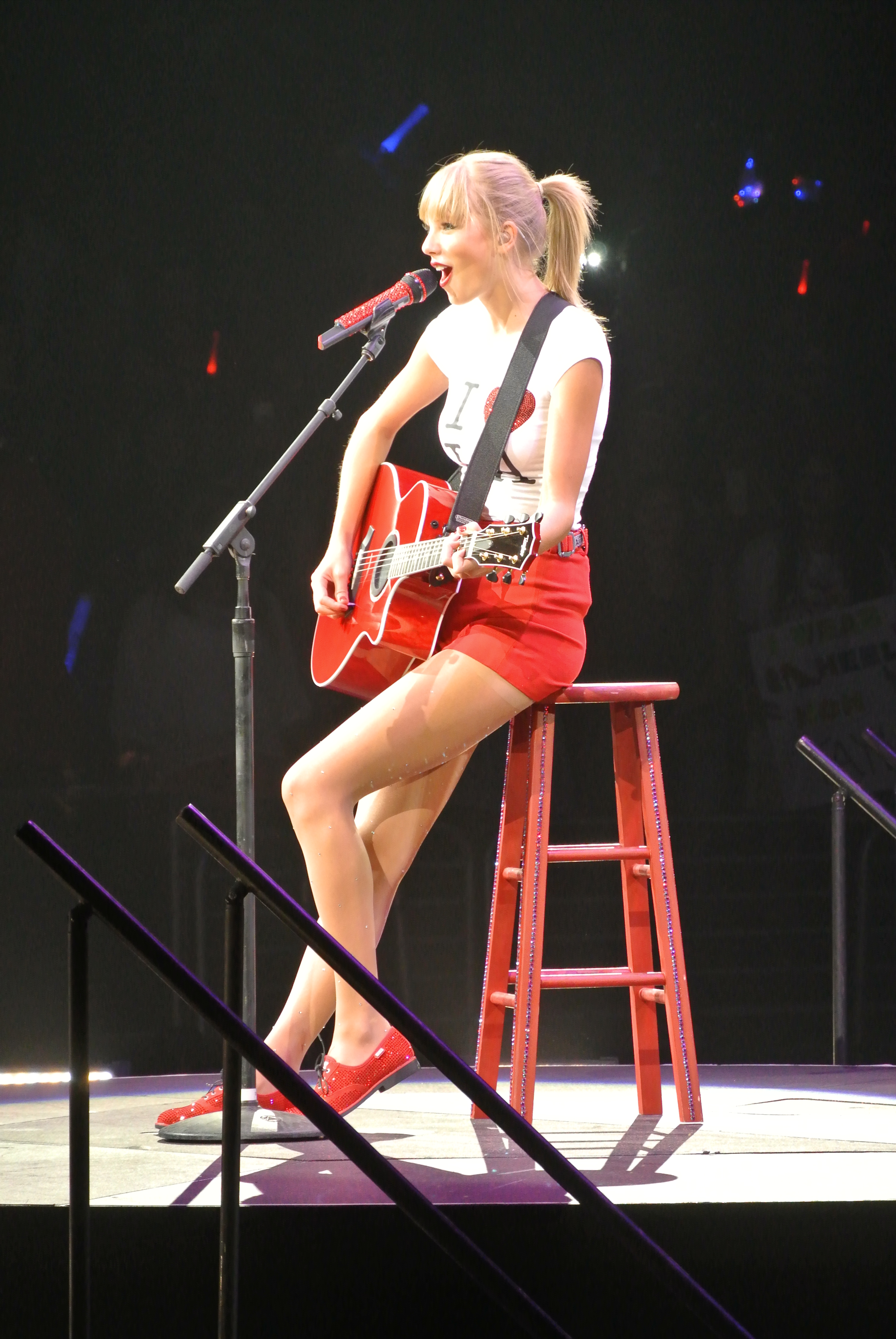
Swift performed "Starlight" on the Red Tour in 2013.

Swift has performed "Starlight" during several concerts. On December 3, 2012, she performed an acoustic rendition at the Robert F. Kennedy Center for Justice and Human Rights, where she was honored with the Ripple of Hope Award for her humanitarian efforts. On March 27, 2013, as part of the Red Tour concert in Newark, New Jersey, she performed the song on acoustic guitar. She also performed it at the Reputation Stadium Tour concert in Brisbane on November 6, 2018. On the Eras Tour, she sang it twice: in Denver on July 15, 2023, and as part of a mashup with "Mine" in Singapore on March 2, 2024.

After signing a new contract with Republic Records, Swift began re-recording her first six studio albums, including Red, in November 2020. The decision followed a public 2019 dispute between Swift and the talent manager Scooter Braun, who acquired Big Machine Records, including the masters of Swift's albums which the label had released. Re-recording them would enable her to have full licensing rights of her songs for commercial use. The re-recorded version of "Starlight" was released as "Starlight (Taylor's Version)", as part of Swift's re-recorded album Red (Taylor's Version), which was released through Republic Records on November 12, 2021.

== Composition and lyrics ==
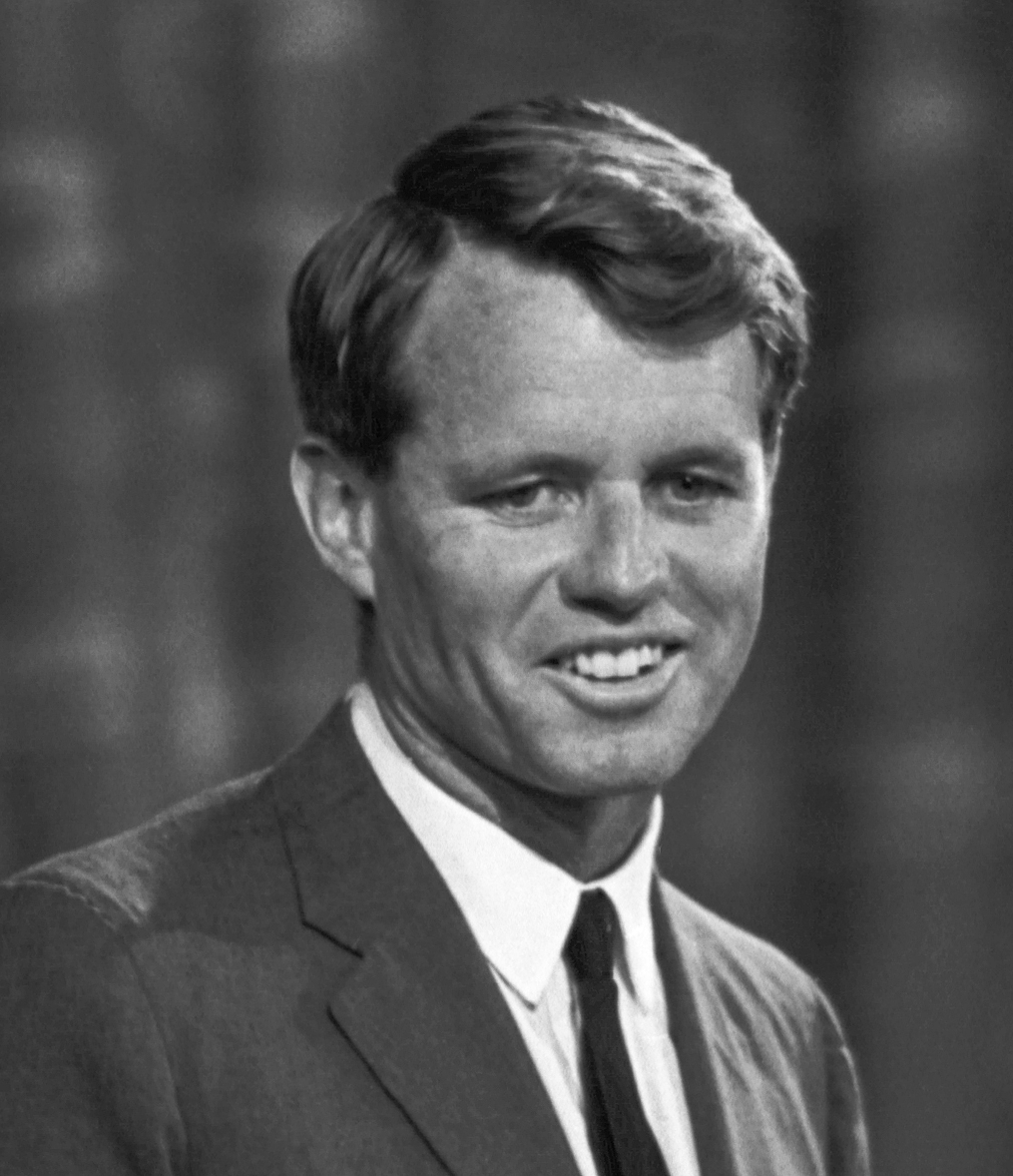
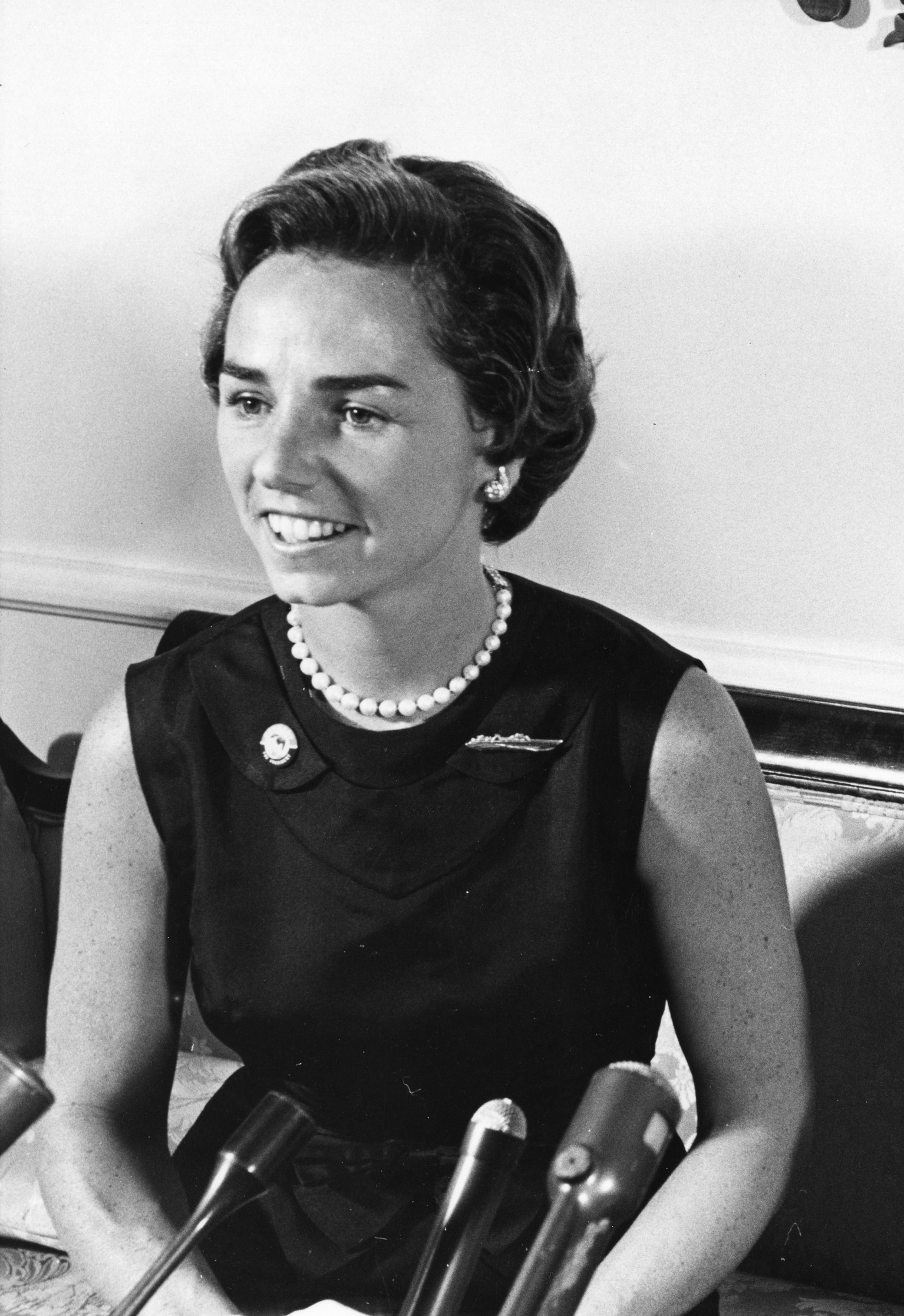
Swift wrote "Starlight" about the teenage romance of Robert F. Kennedy (left) and Ethel Kennedy (right).

Swift was inspired to write "Starlight" by the teenage romance of Ethel Kennedy and Robert F. Kennedy; she had become friends with Ethel and other members of the Kennedy family in 2012. In the liner notes of Red, she dedicated the song to Ethel. According to Swift, she came across a black-and-white picture of Ethel and Robert dancing, thinking to herself about "how much fun they must have had that night". Her imagination of a whirlwind teenage romance informed the lyrics, which tell of a teenage couple intruding a yacht club party in the summer of 1945. The couple was "17 and crazy", pretended they were "a duchess and a prince", and "[danced] like we're made of starlight". Rob Sheffield of Rolling Stone compared the narrative of "Starlight" to that of a F. Scott Fitzgerald romance, an idea corroborated by The Independent's Roisin O'Connor, who thought that the party setting was "Gatsby-esque". Ludovic Hunter-Tilney from the Financial Times opined that the songwriting evoked Bruce Springsteen's style.

Swift, Chapman, and Huff produced "Starlight", which was recorded by Joe Baldridge at Blackbird Studio in Nashville. Its production was coordinated by Mike "Frog" Griffith and Jason Campbell. On the track, Chapman and Huff both played electric guitars; the former also played piano and synth. Jimmie Sloas played bass guitar, Charlie Judge played synth and strings, and J Bonilla played drums and programmed the percussion. A dance-pop song, "Starlight" has a lively production composed of swirling keyboards, twinkling piano, and dynamic electric guitars. Its opening evokes a trance music song, and the break includes an electric guitar solo, conceived by Chapman and performed by Huff. According to the musicologist James E. Perone, "Starlight" displays a novelty in Swift's melodic songwriting: its verses are more "conventionally tuneful" compared to the melodies built on short motives and pitch ranges of her early songs. He overall described the track as "vaguely contemporary country pop in nature", while The Washington Post's Allison Stewart characterized it as "Katy Perry-goes-country" with Swift's twangy vocals. For the critic Annie Zaleski, the song's sound resembles that of Fleetwood Mac's 1987 album Tango in the Night.

The re-recording, "Starlight (Taylor's Version)", was produced by Swift and Christopher Rowe, who recorded her lead vocals at Kitty Committee Studio in Belfast. Paul Mirkovich executive-produced the track, and he played piano, synths, and programmed the drum machines with Pete Amato and Nate Morton. The track was recorded by Justin Derrico and Travis Ference at Capitol Studios in Hollywood; the former also played guitars and bouzouki. Morton also played live drums, and Alexander Krivtsov played electric bass guitar. Engineered by Bryce Bordone and Derek Garten at Prime Recording Studio in Nashville, "Starlight (Taylor's Version)" was mixed by Ghenea at MixStar Studios in Virginia Beach.

== Reception ==
Reviews of "Starlight" were mixed to positive. In lukewarm reviews, Mesfin Fekadu of the Associated Press opined that the song lacks "oomph and feeling" and was derivative of Swift's previous styles, and Sean Daly of the Tampa Bay Times considered it a filler and "midtempo fluff" that "[Swift] can write ... in her sleep". Brian Passey from The Spectrum thought that Swift's songwriting style on "Starlight" evoked the style of Max Martin, which made her lose some trademarks.

More complimentary reviews considered "Starlight" a catchy song. Country Weekly's Joseph Hudak described it as "a dazzler, custom-made for ecstatic nights in the club", Spin's Michael Robbins selected it as one of the Red tracks that "go down like pop punch spiked by pros", and Billboard commented that the song served as a "danceable, fists-in-the-air love anthem". Sam Werner from the Pittsburgh Post-Gazette regarded it as one of Red's songs that are "quintessential Swift", and Stewart selected it as one of the album's tracks that are musically interesting for combining new styles for Swift and her old country sound. MusicOMH's Philip Matusavage wrote that the song "shows that Swift can do brilliant pop all by herself", an idea corroborated by Perone, who thought that Swift could do well as a commercial pop songwriter.

Several critics have considered "Starlight" a precedent to Swift's non-autobiographical songs, specifically the 2020 track "The Last Great American Dynasty". Zaleski contended that the song was one of Swift's early creative nonfiction songs before fully embracing fictional narratives on her 2020 album Folklore. Retrospective rankings of Swift's songs have placed "Starlight" in lower-tier positions. Three journalists from Time aggregated their individual scores and placed "Starlight" 13th out of Red's 16 tracks; Samantha Cooney deemed it an idea that "[didn't] quite work". Vulture's Nate Jones placed it 208th out of Swift's 245 songs up to April 2025: "Never forget that one of the most critically acclaimed albums of the 2010s contains a piece of Ethel Kennedy fanfiction." Sheffield was more positive; he ranked the song 146th out of Swift's 274 songs up to April 2025, saying that the chorus ("Oh my, what a marvelous tune") sounds "quaint [...], yet she makes it stick".

Upon the release of Red in 2012, "Starlight" peaked at number 80 on the Canadian Hot 100, number 28 on the US Hot Country Songs chart, and number 5 on the US Bubbling Under Hot 100 chart. The re-recorded version, "Starlight (Taylor's Version)", peaked at number 73 on the Canadian Hot 100 and number 90 on the US Billboard Hot 100 in 2021; it additionally peaked at number 102 on the Billboard Global 200 chart.

== Personnel ==
"Starlight" (2012)

- Taylor Swift – producer, writer
- Nathan Chapman – producer, electric guitars, electric guitar solo conceiving, piano, synth
- Dann Huff – producer, electric guitars, electric guitar solo performing
- Jimmie Sloas – bass
- Charlie Judge – synth, strings
- J Bonilla – drums, percussion programming
- Mike "Frog" Griffith – production coordinating
- Jason Campbell – production coordinating
- Joe Baldridge – recording
- Serban Ghenea – mixing
- John Hanes – mix engineering
- Tim Roberts – mix engineer assistant
- Tom Coyne – mastering

"Starlight (Taylor's Version)" (2021)

- Taylor Swift – producer, writer, background vocals, lead vocals
- Christopher Rowe – producer, lead vocals recording
- Paul Mirkovich – additional recording, drum machine programming, executive producer, piano, synths
- Justin Derrico – recording, acoustic guitar, bouzouki, electric guitar
- Pete Amato – additional recording, drum machine programming
- Travis Ference – recording, additional recording, editing
- Nate Morton – drum machine programming, drums
- Alexander "Sasha" Krivtsov – electric bass
- Bryce Bordone – engineering
- Derek Garten – engineering, editing
- Serban Ghenea – mixing

== Charts ==
=== "Starlight" ===
Chart performance for "Starlight"
Chart (2012)	Peak position
Canada Hot 100 (Billboard)	80
US Hot Country Songs (Billboard)	28
US Bubbling Under Hot 100 (Billboard)	5
US Digital Song Sales (Billboard)	39

=== "Starlight (Taylor's Version)" ===
Chart performance for "Starlight (Taylor's Version)"
Chart (2021)	Peak position
Canada (Canadian Hot 100)	73
Global 200 (Billboard)	102
US Billboard Hot 100	90
US Hot Country Songs (Billboard)	33
