= Red (Taylor Swift album) =

- Standard edition cover

Studio album by Taylor Swift
- Released: October 22, 2012
- Recorded: c. 2011–2012
- Studios: Blackbird; Pain in the Art (Nashville); Ballroom West (New York City); Conway; Enormous; The Village (Los Angeles); Instrument Landing (Minneapolis); Marlay (North Hollywood); MXM (Stockholm); Garage (Topanga Canyon); Ruby Red (Santa Monica)
- Genres: Pop; country pop; pop rock; arena rock; country rock
- Length: 65:09
- Label: Big Machine
- Producers: Taylor Swift; Nathan Chapman; Jeff Bhasker; Dann Huff; Jacknife Lee; Max Martin; Shellback; Butch Walker; Dan Wilson

Taylor Swift chronology
| Speak Now World Tour – Live (2011) | Red (2012) | 1989 (2014) |

Singles from Red
- 1. "We Are Never Ever Getting Back Together" Released: August 13, 2012; 2. "Begin Again" Released: October 1, 2012; 3. "I Knew You Were Trouble" Released: November 27, 2012; 4. "22" Released: March 12, 2013; 5. "Red" Released: June 24, 2013; 6. "Everything Has Changed" Released: July 14, 2013; 7. "The Last Time" Released: November 4, 2013

Red is the fourth studio album by the American singer-songwriter Taylor Swift. It was released on October 22, 2012, through Big Machine Records. Inspired by a breakup that left behind emotional tumult, Swift framed Red as a breakup album that chronicles the aftermath of a failed relationship.

The songs on Red depict the complex and conflicting feelings ensuing from lost love. To convey those sentiments through music, Swift enlisted new producers to experiment with styles other than the country pop sound of her past albums. She produced Red with Nathan Chapman, Dann Huff, Max Martin, Shellback, Jeff Bhasker, Dan Wilson, Jacknife Lee, and Butch Walker. Regarded by critics as a primarily pop record, it incorporates eclectic styles of rock, folk, and country, featuring both acoustic instruments and electronic arrangements of synths and drum machines. Swift promoted Red as a country album, although music critics debated its genre classification and questioned her identity as a country artist.

Swift supported the album with the Red Tour (2013–2014) and seven singles; "We Are Never Ever Getting Back Together" and "I Knew You Were Trouble" peaked at numbers one and two on the Billboard Hot 100 and in the top 10 in several countries; and "Begin Again" and "Red" were US country top-10 singles. Red topped the charts and received multi-platinum certifications in Australia, Canada, New Zealand, and the United Kingdom. In the United States, it spent seven weeks atop the Billboard 200—making Swift the first artist since the Beatles to have three consecutive albums with over six weeks at number one—and was certified eight-times platinum by the Recording Industry Association of America.

Initial reviews of Red mostly praised Swift's songwriting for showcasing mature perspectives and sharp details, although the pop-leaning production divided critics who deemed it either bold or inconsistent. Red was nominated for Album of the Year and Best Country Album at the 56th Annual Grammy Awards. Retrospectively, critics have regarded it as a career-defining album that reflected Swift's maturity and pushed her songwriting to greater heights. Rolling Stone placed the album at number 99 on their 2023 revision of "500 Greatest Albums of All Time". Following a 2019 dispute regarding the ownership of Swift's back catalog, she released the re-recorded album Red (Taylor's Version) in 2021, and acquired the original album's master recording in 2025.

== Background ==
Taylor Swift's third studio album, Speak Now, was released by Big Machine Records on October 25, 2010. She wrote the album entirely herself and produced it with Nathan Chapman, who had produced both of her previous albums. Speak Now expands on those albums' country pop sound with a more aggressive influence of crossover pop that was also characteristic of Fearless (2008) and incorporates rock styles including pop rock, arena rock, and new wave rock. Speak Now registered in the 2010 Guinness World Records as the fastest-selling digital album by a female artist and was nominated for Best Country Album at the 54th Grammy Awards in 2012.

After Speak Now, Swift continued working with Chapman on her next album. By October 2011, she had written around 25 songs. Although executives at Big Machine felt that the materials were sufficient and congratulated her for finishing work within one year, Swift felt that her creativity was diminished because she had been repeating the same songwriting process. She sought to collaborate with other producers to venture outside of her "comfort zone" of writing songs alone. While Swift viewed the solo-written Speak Now as her statement as a songwriter, she envisioned her fourth studio album as a statement of her "thirst for learning". She reworked the new album while touring on the Speak Now World Tour from 2011 to 2012.

== Writing and production ==
Swift recalled working on her fourth studio album within two years—she wrote songs by herself and produced them with Chapman within the first year, and engaged other producers within the second year. According to Swift, she recruited producers with whom she had not worked, but whose works had instilled curiosities in her. While experimenting sonically, she prioritized conveying emotional sentiments through her lyrics over what particular sounds she should pursue, as with her typical approach. On songs that Swift co-wrote, she first presented her co-writers with the feelings she had been going through, played a rough version of her song on guitar, and asked for their ideas on ways to better convey the story. Each track's production corresponded to the emotion it portrayed, to which Swift attributed the album's "eclectic blend of music".

Production sessions took place in between stops of the Speak Now World Tour during 2011–2012. The first song that Swift wrote was "All Too Well"; during a February 2011 rehearsal of the tour, she ad-libbed lyrics written after a broken relationship while playing a four-chord guitar riff as her touring band spontaneously played backing instruments. Swift told Rolling Stone that this relationship caused "a few roller coasters", and she channeled the tumult into the songs. She continued writing tracks like "Red" and "State of Grace" and produced them with Chapman in her creative base of Nashville, Tennessee. "Red" was a critical point during the album's formation; Big Machine's president Scott Borchetta overheard the production and suggested a pop-oriented sound. After several failed attempts at the desired outcome, Swift asked Borchetta to recruit Max Martin, a Swedish producer known for his chart-topping pop songs. Swift travelled to Los Angeles to work with Martin and his frequent collaborator Shellback, who produced the songs "22", "I Knew You Were Trouble", and "We Are Never Ever Getting Back Together".

Swift and Chapman produced the final version of "Red" with Dann Huff, and the three produced two more tracks: "Starlight" and "Begin Again". She engaged Jeff Bhasker because she was intrigued by his drum production, citing "We Are Young" (2011) by the indie band Fun as an example. Bhasker produced two songs: "Holy Ground" and "The Lucky One". She wrote "Everything Has Changed" with the English singer-songwriter Ed Sheeran and produced it with Butch Walker, and Dan Wilson co-wrote and produced "Treacherous". "The Last Time" is a collaboration of Swift with the Irish-Scottish band Snow Patrol: Gary Lightbody co-wrote and featured as a guest vocalist, and Jacknife Lee produced it. Swift named the album Red, denoting the color to which she associated the tumultuous and extreme emotions that she was experiencing—"intense love, intense frustration, jealousy, confusion". By the time recording began, Swift had written more than 30 songs, and 16 of which made the final cut of the standard edition; Swift was the sole writer of nine tracks as well as two tracks of the three new tracks from the deluxe edition.

== Composition ==
=== Music ===
Red incorporates various styles of pop, rock, and folk, namely dance-pop, indie pop, synth-pop, dubstep, Britrock, pop rock, and arena rock. (Note: Attributed to publications including Rolling Stone, NPR, The Guardian, Beats Per Minute, Atwood Magazine, the Alternative Press, and Consequence) The arrangements of its songs include acoustic instruments, electronic synths, and drum machines. Calling Red her "only true breakup album", Swift said that the diverse musical styles were a "metaphor for how messy a real breakup is". Its first half consists of country and pop songs intertwined with each other; "22", "I Knew You Were Trouble", and "We Are Never Ever Getting Back Together" have a pop production that incorporates electronic vocal processing and hip-hop-influenced bass drums. "State of Grace", "Red", and "Holy Ground" expand on the 1980s arena-rock stylings of Speak Now, while "All Too Well", "I Almost Do", "Stay Stay Stay", "Sad Beautiful Tragic", and "Begin Again" feature the country sound of Swift's earlier music.

Critics were divided on the album's genre classification. Jon Dolan's review for Rolling Stone appeared in the magazine's column for country music, but he described its musical foundation as "post-country rock". Some reviewers commented that Red blurred the divide between country and pop, while others called it a straightforward pop album with contemporary influences, deeming it Swift's inevitable move away from country into mainstream pop. Jon Caramanica of The New York Times regarded Swift as a "pop star in a country context more than a country star" and argued that Red was the culmination of a gradual progress since her debut album to expand beyond the limitations of country music. In his article for Grantland, Steven Hyden argued that Red's broad musical styles made it a country album as much as a pop or rock one. Some retrospective reviews labeled Red as country pop, pop rock, arena rock, and country rock.

=== Lyrics ===
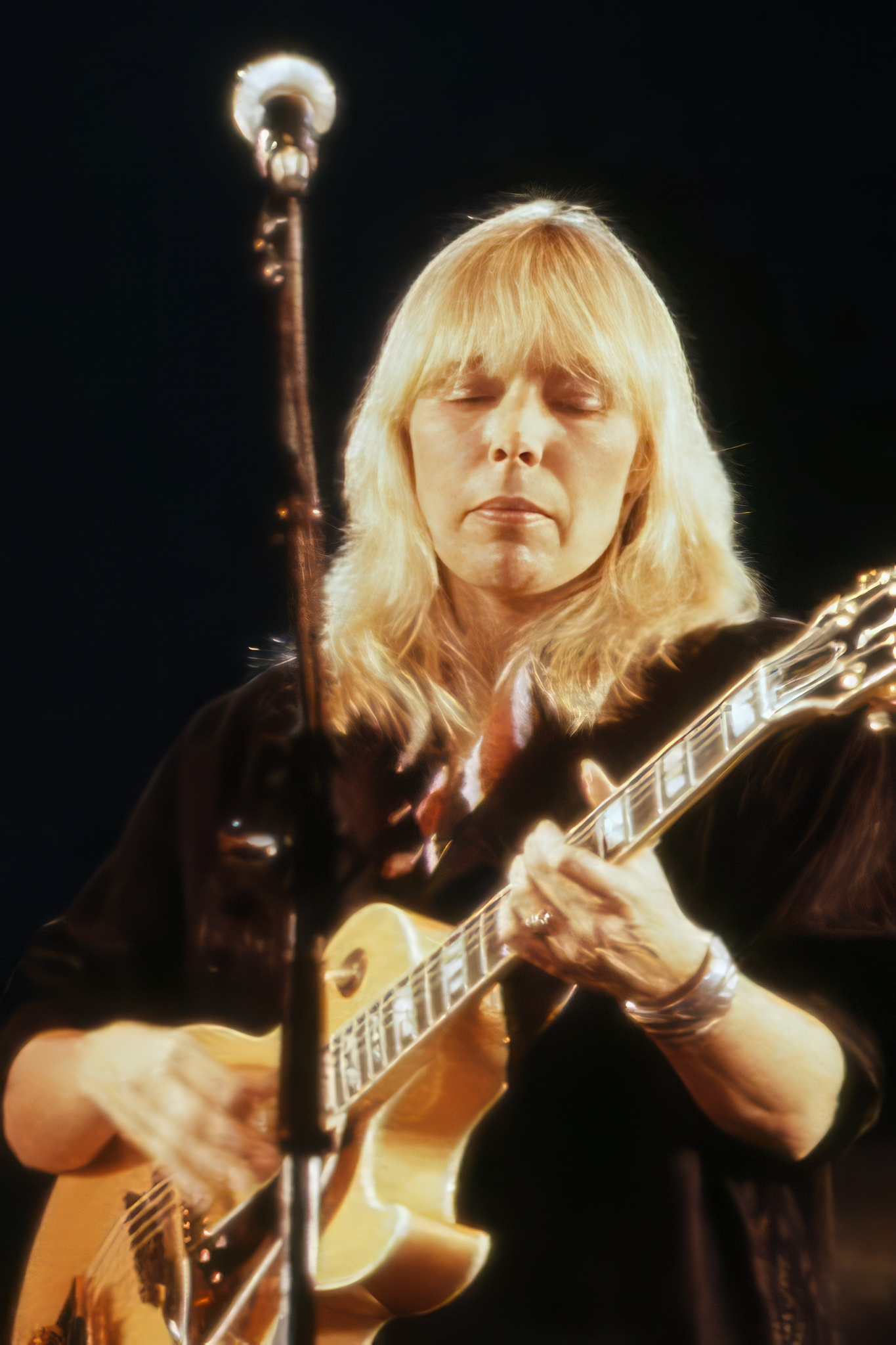
Blue (1971) by Joni Mitchell (pictured) inspired Swift's songwriting on Red.

Swift's songwriting influences on Red include the Chilean poet Pablo Neruda and the Canadian singer-songwriter Joni Mitchell. In the album's physical booklet, she quotes a line from Naruda's poem Tonight I Can Write The Saddest Lines, "Love is so short, forgetting is so long." She was inspired by Mitchell's 1971 album Blue for how it "explores somebody's soul so deeply". Several journalists opined that Blue also influenced the cover artwork of Red, which shows Swift looking downward with her face partially shadowed from her brimmed hat. In The Atlantic, Brad Nelson argued that Swift's songcraft uses details and narrative devices that resemble the styles of rock and roll musicians such as Steely Dan, Bruce Springsteen, and Leonard Cohen.

Using autobiographical songwriting, Red is about the aftermath of an intense breakup, detailing loss, pain, abandonment, and regrets. According to Swift, most of the album was inspired by an ex-boyfriend who later contacted her after listening to it and described the experience as "bittersweet ... like going through a photo album". Whereas her previous albums contain fantasy-driven narratives with happy endings, Red explores the uneasy reality of how a relationship can painfully end; Caramanica wrote, "Almost everything here is corroded in some way." Each song is contained within a fixed scene and narrative with defined characters, informed by the storytelling aspect of country songwriting.

Reflecting Swift's personal experience, Red details her recurring themes of love and heartbreak, but from a more complex perspective gained from her early-20s adulthood. Nelson wrote that Red sees Swift no longer putting the blame solely on ex-lovers and instead viewing heartbreak with "ambiguity", while Emily Yoshida from Vulture opined that there are moments of vulnerability that "feel wise beyond the 22 years Swift was". There are allusions to sexuality on tracks like "State of Grace", "Treacherous", and "Stay Stay Stay"; writing for NPR, J. English regarded this new theme as Swift's coming of age and her first-hand experience and exploration in womanhood, a departure from her past albums which had hinted at sex but from an outsider's perspective.

=== Songs ===
"Treacherous"
"Treacherous" is a folk ballad that blends country and pop styles and features acoustic guitars and vocal harmonies.

"State of Grace" is an arena-rock song that features chiming guitars and dynamic drums, and its lyrics are about the tumultuous feelings stemming from romantic beginnings. According to the musicologist James E. Perone, the lyric, "Love is a ruthless game, unless you play it good and right", sets the overall theme of an album about passionate romance gone wrong. The title track explores an intense relationship that has failed, relating the stages of love to colors: "losing him" is blue, "missing him" is a dark gray, and "loving him" is red. It is built on an acoustic arrangement consisting of string instruments of acoustic guitar, banjitar, cello, fiddle, and bouzouki, which display a country sound, while also featuring electronic vocal manipulation and elements of mainstream pop, soft rock, and adult contemporary. "Treacherous", which begins with slow guitar strumming and percussion and gradually builds up, is a folk ballad that blends country and pop styles and features acoustic guitars and vocal harmonies. Its lyrics are about attempting to protect a fragile relationship.

"I Knew You Were Trouble" has a pop-rock production in its verses, and its refrain begins with a dubstep drop and continues with aggressive synth backing and hip hop-influenced syncopated percussion. In the lyrics of "I Knew You Were Trouble", Swift's character blames herself for a toxic relationship that has ended. Critics considered the song widely different from the music that Swift had explored on her past albums: Perone said that the track's dynamic shifts between the verses were "sudden and unexpected", and Caramanica wrote that the dubstep drop was "a wrecking ball, changing the course not just of the song but also of Ms. Swift's career". "All Too Well", considered by critics the emotional centerpiece of the album's narrative, has a slow-building production with overdubs of acoustic guitar, electric guitar, bass, drums, and harmony vocals. It chronicles a lost relationship from the peak of romance to the lingering memories after it has ended.

"22" is about celebrating the joys of being youthful by going out and meeting new people to move on from heartbreak. Its verses are driven by acoustic guitar, and its refrain incorporates a dance-influenced arrangement consisting of electronic synths and hip hop-influenced bass drums. According to Perone, the arrangement of "I Almost Do" is derived from Swift's early country songs: its verses are formed on short melodic motives and Swift's lower register vocals, while its refrain has a longer range in Swift's vocals. The song displays elements of country and folk via acoustic guitars and open string notes in the texture. In "I Almost Do", Swift's character wonders what she would do if an ex-lover asked her to come back to him, and she admits she would likely agree to do so. Her character in "We Are Never Ever Getting Back Together", meanwhile, promises an ex-lover that they will never rekindle their relationship. Swift's vocals in the song are electronically processed, and its production features an acoustic guitar arrangement alongside filtered guitar tones, synths, and hip hop-influenced bass drums. "Stay Stay Stay", a fast-tempo song combining styles of country and 1980s pop, features toy piano, ukulele, mandolin, and hand claps, and its lyrics are about two lovers trying to reconcile after a fight.

"Holy Ground"
"Holy Ground" combines an arena rock and country rock production with country pop and pop rock beats to express gratitude for a failed relationship.

"The Last Time", a duet with Lightbody, is a melancholic power ballad that begins with piano and crescendoes with strings and electric guitars. Perone compared its production with the music of late-1970s and early-1980s rock bands but with a muted texture. Lightbody's and Swift's characters detail their perspectives on a failing long-term relationship in the first and second verses, and the refrain is backed by an orchestra playing intense strings and brass. In "Holy Ground", Swift's character reminisces about an absent lover and the specific memories of their past, expressing gratitude for their failed relationship. It is an arena rock, country rock, and heartland rock track that incorporates country pop and pop rock beats; persistent drums; and a twangy guitar riff. "Sad Beautiful Tragic", an intimate and melancholic acoustic track, is composed of overdubs of acoustic instruments. She wrote the song when reminiscing about a relationship that had ended "months before", which evoked wistful feelings. Perone commented that "Sad Beautiful Tragic" extended the "lyrical impressionism" of Swift's songwriting by using various images without drawing a straightforward connection between them. "The Lucky One" incorporates a driving drum machine and has a soft-rock, indie rock, and 1960s pop-rock sound. Written in third-person perspective, the lyrics tell the story of a successful singer who looked "like a '60s queen" in her high-school days, was envied by her friends after achieving fame in "the angels' city", and ultimately "chose the rose garden over Madison Square".

"Everything Has Changed", a duet with Sheeran, is a mid-tempo acoustic guitar-led ballad that incorporates deep bass drums. Perone commented that the song's arrangement is similar to the music from Swift's debut album, using "a high degree of syncopation" at the sixteenth note level. In the song, Swift and Sheeran sing about the beginnings of a new romance, alternating their lead vocals in the verses. Swift was inspired to write "Starlight" by the teenage romance of Ethel Kennedy and Robert F. Kennedy. In the lyrics, Swift's character reminisces about meeting her lover one evening in the "summer of '45" and how they intruded a "yacht club party" and danced "like [they] were made of starlight". Containing an electric guitar solo, "Starlight" is a dance-pop song that Perone deemed "vaguely contemporary country pop in nature". In the closing track of the standard edition, "Begin Again", Swift's character explores how a newfound love interest differs from her ex-lovers, giving her hopes of a new romance. According to Perone, that the genre-spanning Red concludes with a country ballad confirms country music as an integral part of Swift's musical identity.

The deluxe edition of Red includes three extra original songs: "The Moment I Knew", "Come Back ... Be Here", and "Girl at Home"; demo recordings of "Treacherous" and "Red"; and an acoustic version of "State of Grace". "The Moment I Knew" is a somber pop-rock piano ballad; its lyrics were inspired by Swift's 21st birthday: her narrator realizes that the relationship is coming to an end when she keeps staring at the door, hoping her boyfriend would appear to celebrate her birthday party, but he never comes. "Come Back... Be Here", with a 2000s adult-contemporary-oriented sound, has lyrics about a long-distance relationship with few chances to endure. "Girl at Home", a 1980s-styled folk-pop song with elements of electronic music and country, details a woman's contempt for a flirtatious man who is in a relationship with another woman.

== Release and promotion ==
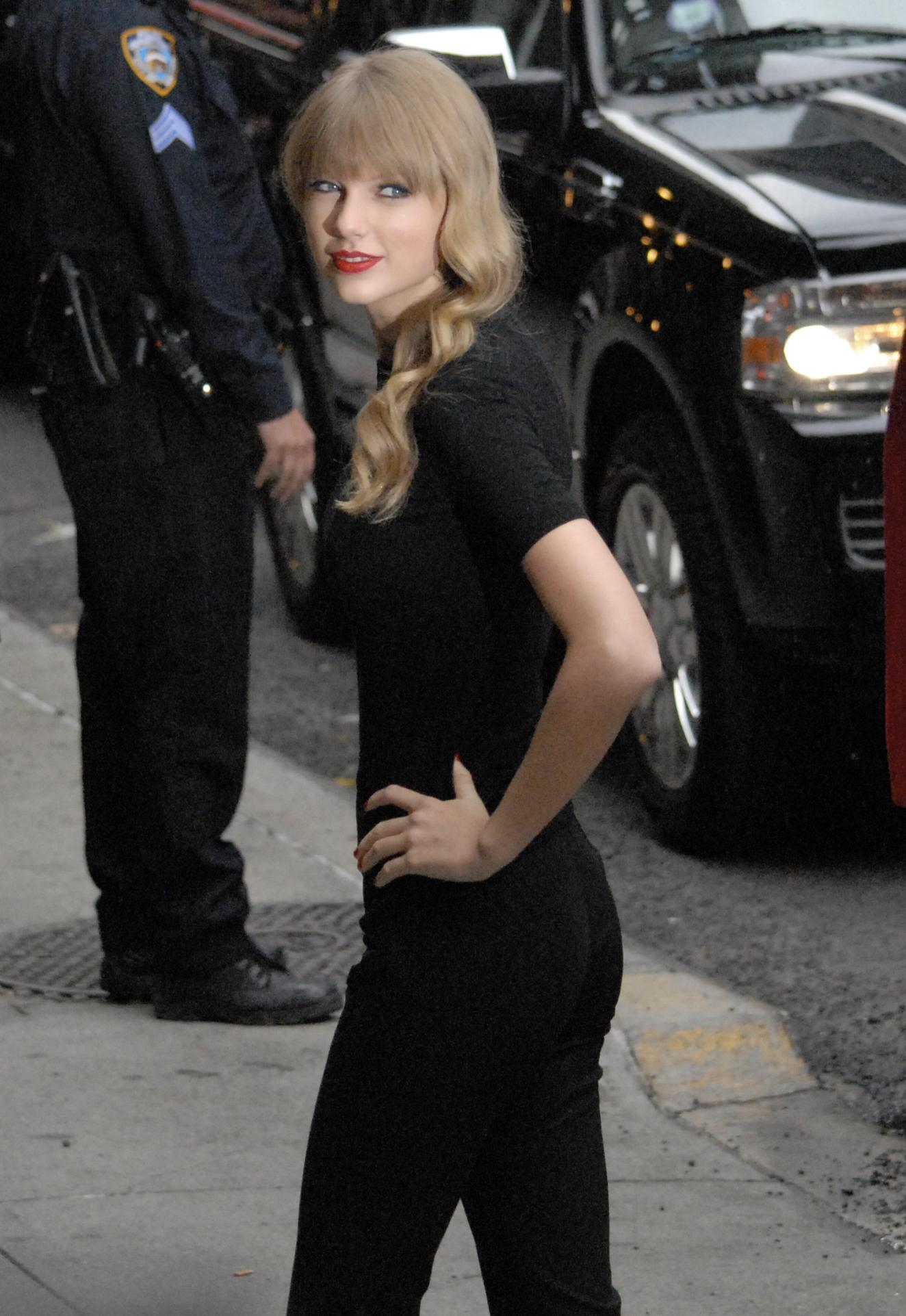
Swift outside the studio of Late Show with David Letterman to promote Red, October 23, 2012

Swift and Big Machine implemented an extensive marketing plan for Red, encompassing brand endorsements, multimedia promotions, and song releases. She announced the album on August 13, 2012, via a live webchat held on Google Hangouts. Her corporate partnerships included album distribution deals at retail sites by Starbucks, Walgreens, Walmart, and Papa John's, and an exclusive merchandise line with Keds. Both the standard and deluxe editions were released on October 22, 2012. In the United States, the standard edition was available in digital and physical formats, and the deluxe edition was available exclusively for physical purchase at Target.

A day after the release, Swift began a cycle of television appearances in the United States, which included Good Morning America (October 23), Late Show with David Letterman (October 23), The View (October 24), The Ellen DeGeneres Show (October 25), Katie (October 26), and 20/20 (October 26). She gave interviews to as many as 72 radio stations, mostly in the United States and some from South Africa, New Zealand, Spain, Germany, and Mexico. On social media, Swift encouraged her fans to ask their local radio stations to air her songs. Her live performances at awards shows included the MTV Video Music Awards, the Country Music Association Awards, and the American Music Awards. In November 2012, she embarked on a promotional tour in Japan, appearing on Nippon Television's show Sukkiri and giving an interview to the radio station InterFM. On a promotional tour for Red in France in 2013, she gave a private concert to fans and journalists in Paris, and appeared at the NRJ Music Awards.

"We Are Never Ever Getting Back Together" was released as the lead single on August 13, 2012. It was Swift's first number-one single on the Billboard Hot 100. After Billboard revised the Hot Country Songs chart to include downloads and streaming in addition to airplay, the single spent 10 weeks at number one due to strong digital sales. Elsewhere, it topped the Canadian and New Zealand singles charts and peaked in the top 10 in Australia, Japan, Norway, Spain, and the United Kingdom. (Note: Chart positions for Canada; Australia, New Zealand, Norway, Spain; Japan; the UK) During a four-week countdown to the album's release, from September 24 to October 22, Swift previewed one album track each week via Good Morning America: "Begin Again", "Red", "I Knew You Were Trouble", and "State of Grace". "Begin Again" and "Red" were released to US country radio as singles, and they both peaked in the top 10 of Country Airplay. "I Knew You Were Trouble" was released to US pop radio on November 27, 2012; it peaked atop the Pop Songs chart for seven weeks, reached number two on the Billboard Hot 100, and peaked in the top 10 in Australia, New Zealand, Denmark, Germany, Switzerland, and the United Kingdom. (Note: Chart positions for the Billboard Hot 100; the Pop Songs chart; Australia, New Zealand, Denmark, Germany, Switzerland; the UK) Other singles were "22" and "Everything Has Changed", which reached the top 10 in the United Kingdom, and "The Last Time".

Despite Red's promotion as a country album, its diverse musical styles sparked a media debate over Swift's status as a country artist. Its two most successful singles, "We Are Never Ever Getting Back Together" and "I Knew You Were Trouble", were successful pop hits that had little impact on country radio. Spin argued Red was difficult to categorize because country music was "the most dynamically vibrant pop genre of the last decade or so". Critics commented that Swift had always been more pop-oriented than country, and they described Red as her inevitable move to mainstream pop. In an interview with The Wall Street Journal, Swift said that country music "feels like home" and responded to the critical debate: "I leave the genre labeling to other people."

=== Touring ===
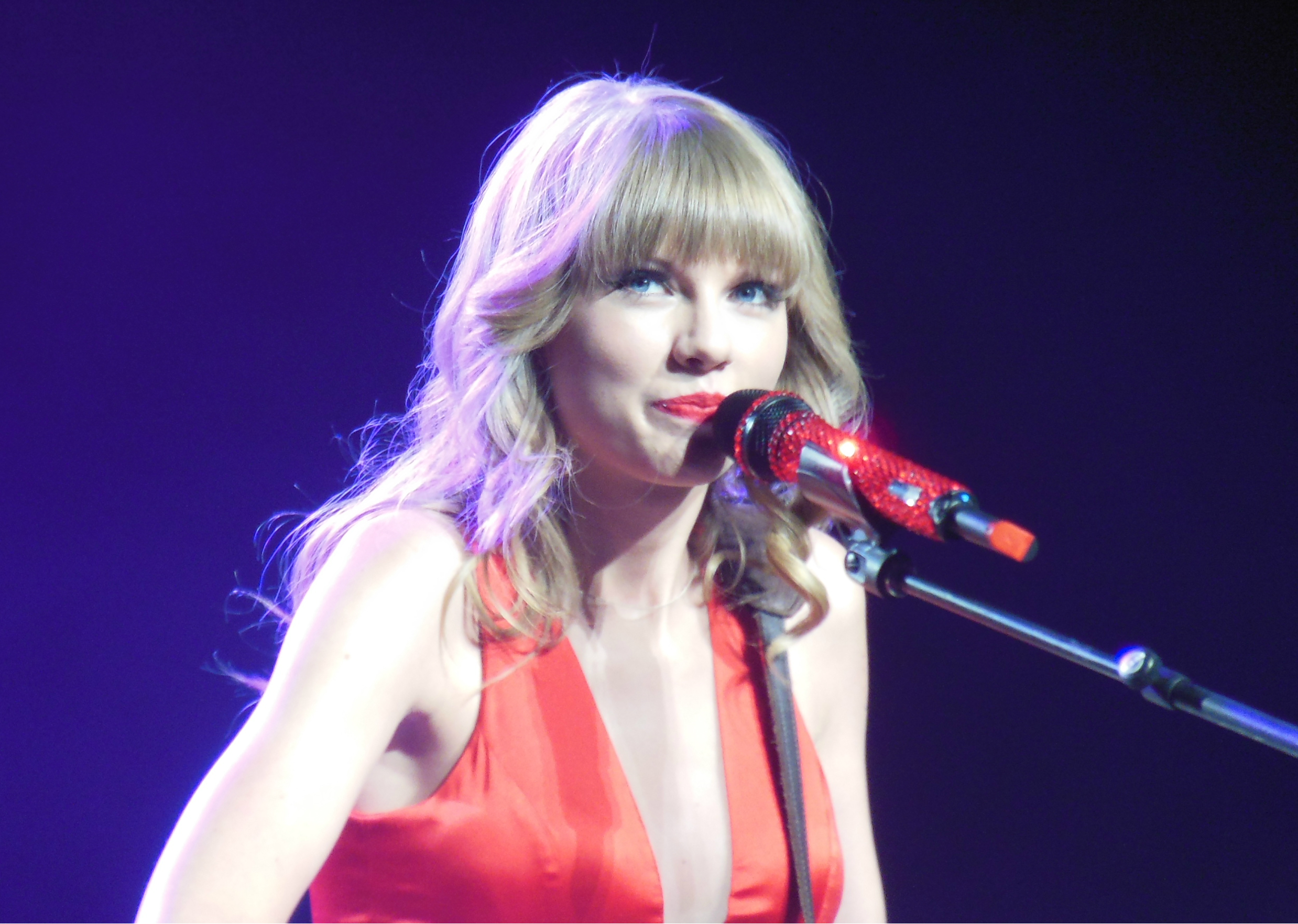
Swift on the Red Tour in 2013

Swift announced the first North American leg of the Red Tour on October 26, 2012. Its first 58 dates began in Omaha, Nebraska, visited Canada and the United States throughout the spring and summer of 2013, and concluded in September in Nashville, Tennessee. To support a high demand, Swift held the concerts in sports arenas and stadiums. After the North American leg, the Red Tour visited Australasia, the United Kingdom, Germany, and Asia.

The Red Tour broke several revenue records. The four shows at Staples Center in Los Angeles extended Swift's total of sold-out shows to 11, making her the solo artist with the most sold-out shows at the venue. She was the first female artist to sell out the Sydney Football Stadium since its opening in 1988. Tickets for the Shanghai show sold out within 60 seconds, setting the Chinese record for the fastest sellout. When it ended in June 2014, the Red Tour had grossed $150.2 million and became the highest-grossing tour by a country artist of all time.

== Commercial performance ==
In the United States, Red debuted at number one on the Billboard 200 with first-week sales of 1.208 million copies. It surpassed Garth Brooks's Double Live (1998) as the fastest-selling country album and, together with Speak Now, made Swift the first female solo artist to have two million-selling albums within one week. Red spent seven non-consecutive weeks at number one on the Billboard 200, making Swift the first female artist and the first overall since the Beatles in 1969 to have three consecutive studio albums each spend six or more weeks atop the chart. (Note: Fearless spent 11 weeks at number one in 2008–2009, and Speak Now spent 6 weeks in 2010–2011.) Its number-one position for the week ending December 23, 2012, marked Swift's third consecutive time—after Fearless and Speak Now—to have a number-one album during the last week before Christmas, which is traditionally the most competitive week of the year.

On Billboard's Top Country Albums chart, Red spent 16 weeks at number one and was the year-end number-one album of both 2012 and 2013. It was the second-best-selling album of 2012 in the United States with 3.11 million copies sold after two months of sales, and surpassed 3.84 million copies after one year of release. The album had sold 4.582 million US copies as of January 2024, and it was certified eight-times platinum for surpassing eight million album-equivalent units by the Recording Industry Association of America in October 2025.

Red sold 2.8 million copies worldwide after less than one month of release, 5.2 million by the end of 2012—the global second-best-selling album of the year, and 8 million by August 2014. The album reached number one on charts in Australia, Canada, New Zealand, Ireland, and Scotland. It received platinum or higher certifications in Australia (five-times platinum), Canada (four-times platinum), and New Zealand (six-times platinum). In the United Kingdom, Red was Swift's first number-one album and had four top-10 singles, the most of her albums; it had sold 619,000 copies as of June 2021 and was certified triple platinum by the British Phonographic Industry in January 2025.

== Critical reception ==
Professional ratings
Aggregate scores
| Source | Rating |
|---|---|
| AnyDecentMusic? | 6.6/10 |
| Metacritic | 77/100 |
Review scores
| Source | Rating |
| AllMusic | (Note: Upon Red's release, AllMusic gave the album a four-star rating. The site reassessed the album with a five-star rating since around August 2020.) |
| The A.V. Club | B+ |
| The Daily Telegraph | 3/5 stars |
| Entertainment Weekly | B+ |
| The Guardian | 4/5 stars |
| Los Angeles Times | 3/4 stars |
| MSN Music (Expert Witness) | A− |
| Pitchfork | 9.0/10 |
| Rolling Stone | 3.5/5 stars |
| Spin | 8/10 |

Upon its release, Red received generally positive reviews from music critics, although there were a mix of complimentary and dismissive reviews. On the review aggregator website Metacritic, the album received a weighted average score of 77 out of 100, based on 23 reviews in mainstream publications.

Many reviews praised Swift's songwriting for its emotional exploration; they regarded Red as a pivotal album for Swift, citing its themes of adulthood and real-life experiences as a representation of her maturity. (Note: Attributed to reviews in Billboard, The New York Times, Rolling Stone, and Spin) Dolan highlighted the "stark-relief emotional mapping" that recalled the singer-songwriters Joni Mitchell and Carole King, while Entertainment Weekly's Melissa Maerz hailed the detail-heavy narratives of songs like "All Too Well", and The Observer's Alex Macpherson remarked that Swift was able to "pull you inside her break-up narratives" with her use of language. The Guardian's Kate Mossman commented that the many emotions on Red made it "one of the finest fantasies pop music has ever constructed". Nelson opined that Swift's songwriting on Red became sharper and more nuanced; in his retrospective review for Pitchfork, he highlighted a "newfound patience" to her perspectives that resulted in multi-dimensional songs. In a more measured praise, Stephen Thomas Erlewine from AllMusic opined that the lyrics were at times "on the nose". American Songwriter's Jewly Hight commented that although Swift's songwriting outlook was occasionally one-sided, it was still more accomplished than "plenty of songwriters twice her age".

The production received mixed reviews, with the pop-leaning tracks being particularly divisive. Consequence of Sound's Jon Bernstein likened this reaction to the controversy when Bob Dylan "went electric". On a positive side, Billboard opined that the album pushed Swift to artistic heights with successful experimentations. Erlewine highlighted the "pristine pop confections" and remarked that she deftly executed the diverse musical styles, while Caramanica and Randall Roberts of the Los Angeles Times commented that the genre-spanning styles showcased a bold and worthwhile transition. Less complimentary reviews from Slant Magazine's Jonathan Keefe and The A.V. Club's Michael Gallucci deemed the broad musical styles ambitious but inconsistent, which prevented Red from being a truly great pop album. On a more critical side, Mesfin Fekadu of the Associated Press wrote that the experimentations did not always succeed, resulting in an "empty" sound compared to Fearless and Speak Now, while James Lachno of The Daily Telegraph deemed the production bloated and commented that it would be better had Swift abandoned country altogether.

Within weeks after the initial reviews, several critics defended the album. Channing Freeman of Sputnikmusic opined that the criticism towards the pop-leaning production was due to sexism, citing several online reviews that focused on Swift's love life and undermined her musicianship. He wrote that by embracing "pure pop sensibilities", the album became a distillation of all the conflicting emotions she had explored in her lyricism. In PopMatters, Nathan Wisnicki commented that the mixed reviews were a result of music journalism's tendency to pigeonhole Swift into a specific genre. He argued that Red showed Swift as both a deft songwriter and a great pop artist, which made her worthy of being representative of her generation, Millennials. The rock critic Robert Christgau viewed Red as Swift's attempt to approximate Stephin Merritt on 69 Love Songs, writing that while she "hits the mark less often than Merritt – 65 or 70 percent", the ambitious reach "forces her to aim higher" and resulted in songs that "hit just as hard", like "Begin Again", "Stay Stay Stay", and "the feisty ones".

== Accolades ==
In 2013, Red was nominated for Album of the Year at the Country Music Association Awards, the Academy of Country Music Awards, the American Music Awards, and the Libera Awards, and it won Favorite Country Album at the American Music Awards, and Top Billboard 200 Album and Top Country Album at the Billboard Music Awards. Internationally, the album won Top Selling Album at the Canadian Country Music Association Awards, helped Swift earn a nomination for Best International Artist at the Australian ARIA Music Awards, and was nominated for International Album of the Year at the Canadian Juno Awards. At the 56th Annual Grammy Awards in 2014, Red was nominated for Album of the Year and Best Country Album.

Various publications featured Red on their lists of the best albums of 2012. The album was ranked in the top 10 by Billboard, Newsday, MTV News; top 20 by The Guardian and Stereogum; top 30 by PopMatters, and top 50 by Rolling Stone and Spin, who additionally included it in their list of the year's best country albums. On the mass critics' poll Pazz & Jop by The Village Voice, it ranked 17th based on aggregate scores of all voters, earning votes from 34 critics. Caramanica ranked it second on his list of 2012's best albums (behind Emeli Sandé's Our Version of Events).

== Legacy ==
=== Critical recognition ===
Although its diverse styles were met with mixed reactions upon release from critics and fans, who took issue with the pop-leaning direction, Red has been considered by critics as a career-defining album for Swift. They highlight the genre-blending sound as a bold and successful endeavor that laid the groundwork to Swift's full transition to pop music. (Note: Attributed to multiple references:)—Pitchfork opined that the eclectic production expanded Swift's songcraft to reach higher standards, while some critics opined that the pop songwriting influenced Swift's more streamlined writing on her later albums. According to i-D, the album turned the "arena-rock-meets-country-pop" sound into her signature. Meanwhile, Hyden opined that it solidified Swift's status as a genre-agnostic musician capable of turning any sound into her own. Red's themes of heartbreak and sexuality during early adulthood marked her evolution to embrace more complex and subtle songwriting perspectives on relationships in subsequent albums.

Several critics have regarded Red as Swift's magnum opus, and it has frequently been ranked by publications in the upper tier of her entire discography, (Note: Attributed to multiple references:) being ranked as her best album by The A.V. Club, i-D, the Star Tribune, and Paste. (Note: References:) The critic Rob Sheffield wrote that the album established Swift as both the representative pop songwriter of her generation and one of the greatest songwriters of all time. Publications that ranked Red among the best albums of the 2010s include Atwood Magazine, The Independent, and Pitchfork; it was ranked within the top 10 by Billboard, Rolling Stone, Stereogum, Uproxx, and the Tampa Bay Times, (Note: References:) while Taste of Country ranked it as one of the best country albums of the decade. Rolling Stone ranked it at number 99 on its 2023 revision of "The 500 Greatest Albums of All Time" and number 36 on its 2025 list of "The 250 Greatest Albums of the 21st Century So Far", and Paste featured the album at number 171 on their 2025 list "The 300 Greatest Albums of All Time".

=== Popular culture ===
Red was released when Swift's popularity became increasingly intertwined with tabloid gossip that routinely publicized her love life and associated her songs to her ex-boyfriends, leading to misogynistic criticism that trivialized her songwriting. According to the music critic Jessica Hopper, the criticism of Swift's music in relation to her public image was a natural product of how young female artists engaged with their fans through music. By constructing an image that reflected her transition from "pop's Virgin Queen" into a sexually-aware woman, but with an implicit and feminine approach, she conflated her songs with the tabloid gossip to create a greater narrative, which showcased a deft manipulation of her own image, "a cultural prescience that speaks to [her] ambition and interest in being understood".

Red's successful pop singles influenced Swift to work again with Martin and Shellback on her fifth studio album, 1989 (2014), which recalibrated her artistic identity from country to pop. Critics have regarded Red as a classic breakup album that had a generational impact on both Millennials and Generation Z, and cited it as an influence on confessional singer-songwriters including Halsey, Kacey Musgraves, Troye Sivan, Billie Eilish, Olivia Rodrigo, and Conan Gray. (Note: Attributed to multiple references:) In the view of Hyden, the album inspired a generation of "indie" artists to create pop-friendly music without being confined by the "underground" rock scene. In 2019, an indie rock tribute album titled ReRed, featuring Wild Pink, Adult Mom, Chris Farren, among others, was released with all of its proceeds going to the Equal Justice Initiative.

=== 2021 re-recording ===
Following the 2019 dispute over the ownership of the masters to her back catalog, Swift began re-recording her first six studio albums including Red in November 2020. By re-recording those albums, Swift had the ownership to the new master recordings, which enabled her to control the licensing of her songs for commercial use and therefore devalued the Big Machine-owned masters. The re-recording of Red, titled Red (Taylor's Version), was released on November 12, 2021. In addition to the re-recordings of the 19 tracks on the original Red, the re-recorded album features re-recorded versions of the charity single "Ronan", the songs "Better Man" and "Babe" that Swift had written for the country groups Little Big Town and Sugarland, the 10-minute version of "All Too Well", and six previously unreleased tracks. The ownership of the original album's master recording, alongside her other five albums released under Big Machine, was acquired by Swift on May 30, 2025.

== Track listing ==
Standard edition
| No. | Title | Writer(s) | Producer(s) | Length |
|---|---|---|---|---|
| 1. | "State of Grace" | Taylor Swift | Swift; Nathan Chapman | 4:55 |
| 2. | "Red" | Swift | Swift; Chapman; Dann Huff | 3:43 |
| 3. | "Treacherous" | Swift; Dan Wilson | Wilson | 4:02 |
| 4. | "I Knew You Were Trouble" | Swift; Max Martin; Shellback | Martin; Shellback | 3:39 |
| 5. | "All Too Well" | Swift; Liz Rose | Swift; Chapman | 5:29 |
| 6. | "22" | Swift; Martin; Shellback | Martin; Shellback | 3:52 |
| 7. | "I Almost Do" | Swift | Swift; Chapman | 4:04 |
| 8. | "We Are Never Ever Getting Back Together" | Swift; Martin; Shellback | Martin; Shellback; Swift (Note: The album's liner notes credit Martin and Shellback as producers, but the Recording Academy, in a list announcing nominees for the Grammy Award for Record of the Year in 2012, additionally credits Swift as a producer.) | 3:13 |
| 9. | "Stay Stay Stay" | Swift | Swift; Chapman | 3:25 |
| 10. | "The Last Time" (featuring Gary Lightbody of Snow Patrol) | Swift; Lightbody; Jacknife Lee | Lee | 4:59 |
| 11. | "Holy Ground" | Swift | Jeff Bhasker | 3:22 |
| 12. | "Sad Beautiful Tragic" | Swift | Swift; Chapman | 4:44 |
| 13. | "The Lucky One" | Swift | Bhasker | 4:00 |
| 14. | "Everything Has Changed" (featuring Ed Sheeran) | Swift; Sheeran | Butch Walker | 4:05 |
| 15. | "Starlight" | Swift | Swift; Chapman; Huff | 3:40 |
| 16. | "Begin Again" | Swift | Swift; Chapman; Huff | 3:57 |
| Total length: | | | | 65:09 |

Deluxe edition
| No. | Title | Writer(s) | Producer(s) | Length |
|---|---|---|---|---|
| 17. | "The Moment I Knew" | Swift | Swift; Chapman | 4:46 |
| 18. | "Come Back... Be Here" | Swift; Wilson | Wilson | 3:43 |
| 19. | "Girl at Home" | Swift | Swift; Chapman | 3:40 |
| 20. | "Treacherous" (original demo recording) | Swift; Wilson | Wilson | 4:00 |
| 21. | "Red" (original demo recording) | Swift | Swift; Chapman | 3:47 |
| 22. | "State of Grace" (acoustic version) | Swift | Swift; Chapman | 5:23 |
| Total length: | | | | 25:19 |

=== Notes ===
- "I Knew You Were Trouble" is stylized as "I Knew You Were Trouble." (with a period).

== Personnel ==
Musicians

- Taylor Swift – lead vocals, background vocals, acoustic guitar
- Nathan Chapman – bass guitar, drums, acoustic guitar, electric guitar, keyboards, mandolin, percussion, piano, soloist, synthesizer, background vocals
- Peggy Baldwin – cello
- Brett Banducci – viola
- Jeff Bhasker – bass guitar, keyboards, piano, background vocals
- J. Bonilla – drums, percussion
- Nick Buda – drums
- Tom Bukovac – electric guitar
- David Campbell – string arrangements, conducting
- Daphne Chen – violin
- Lauren Chipman – viola
- Eric Darken – percussion
- Marcia Dickstein – harp
- Richard Dodd – cello
- Paul Franklin – steel guitar
- Eric Gorfain – violin
- Dann Huff – bouzouki, electric guitar, high strung guitar, mandolin
- Charlie Judge – accordion, Hammond B3, piano, upright piano, strings, synthaxe, synthesizer
- Gina Kronstadt – violin
- John Krovoza – cello
- Marisa Kuney – violin
- Jacknife Lee – bass guitar, guitar, keyboards
- Max Martin – keyboards
- Grant Mickelson – guitar
- Anders Mouridsen – guitar
- Jamie Muhoberac – cello
- Neli Nikolaeva – violin
- Owen Pallett – conductor, orchestration
- Radu Pieptea – violin
- Simeon Pillich – contrabass
- Wes Precourt – violin
- Bill Rieflin – drums
- Shellback – bass guitar, guitar, acoustic guitar, electric guitar, keyboards
- Jake Sinclair – bass guitar, background vocals
- Jimmie Lee Sloas – bass guitar
- Aaron Sterling – drums
- Jeff Takiguchi – contrabass
- Andy Thompson – guitar, electric piano
- Ilya Toshinsky – mandolin
- Butch Walker – drums, guitar, keyboards, percussion, background vocals
- Patrick Warren – string arrangements
- Amy Wickman – violin
- Dan Wilson – bass guitar, electric guitar, piano, background vocals
- Rodney Wirtz – violin
- Jonathan Yudkin – cello, fiddle, violin
- Caitlin Evanson – background vocals
- Liz Huett – background vocals ("The Moment I Knew")
- Tyler Sam Johnson – background vocals
- Gary Lightbody – featured artist, background vocals
- Ciara O'Leary – background vocals
- Ed Sheeran – featured artist

Production

- Taylor Swift – songwriting, production
- Nathan Chapman – production, engineering
- Joe Baldridge – engineering
- Sam Bell – engineering
- Matt Bishop – engineering
- Delbert Bowers – assistant
- Chad Carlson – engineering
- Tom Coyne – mastering
- Leland Elliott – assistant
- Jeff Bhasker – production
- Eric Eylands – assistant
- Greg Fuess – assistant
- Chris Galland – assistant
- Şerban Ghenea – mixing
- Matty Green – assistant
- John Hanes – mixing engineering
- Sam Holland – engineering
- Dann Huff – production
- David Huff – digital editing
- Michael Ilbert – engineer
- Tyler Sam Johnson – guitar engineer
- Jacknife Lee – engineering, production, songwriting, programming
- Gary Lightbody – songwriting
- Steve Marcantonio – engineer
- Manny Marroquin – mixing
- Max Martin – production, songwriting
- Seth Morton – assistant
- Justin Niebank – mixing
- Chris Owens – assistant
- John Rausch – engineering
- Matt Rausch – engineering
- Tim Roberts – assistant
- Eric Robinson – engineering
- Liz Rose – songwriting
- Pawel Sek – engineering
- Shellback – production, songwriting, programming
- Ed Sheeran – songwriting
- Jake Sinclair – engineering
- Mark "Spike" Stent – mixing
- Andy Thompson – engineering
- Butch Walker – production
- Hank Williams – mastering
- Brian David Willis – engineer
- Dan Wilson – production, songwriting

Visuals and design

- Taylor Swift – creative director
- Sarah Barlow – photography
- Austin Hale – designing
- Jemma Muradian – hair stylist
- Bethany Newman – art direction
- Josh Newman – art direction
- Lorrie Turk – make-up artist

Managerial

- Scott Borchetta – executive producer
- Leann Bennett – production coordination
- Jason Campbell – production coordination
- Mike "Frog" Griffith – production coordination
- JoAnn Tominaga – production coordination

== Charts ==
=== Weekly charts ===
2012–2013 weekly chart performance
| Chart (2012–2013) | Peak position |
|---|---|
| Australian Albums (ARIA) | 1 |
| Australian Country Albums (ARIA) | 1 |
| Austrian Albums (Ö3 Austria) | 3 |
| Belgian Albums (Ultratop Flanders) | 2 |
| Belgian Albums (Ultratop Wallonia) | 25 |
| Canadian Albums (Billboard) | 1 |
| Chinese Albums (Sino Chart) | 1 |
| Croatian Albums (HDU) | 27 |
| Danish Albums (Hitlisten) | 3 |
| Dutch Albums (Album Top 100) | 7 |
| Finnish Albums (Suomen virallinen lista) | 49 |
| French Albums (SNEP) | 30 |
| German Albums (Offizielle Top 100) | 5 |
| Irish Albums (IRMA) | 1 |
| Italian Albums (FIMI) | 3 |
| Japanese Albums (Oricon) | 3 |
| Japanese Albums (Billboard Japan) | 5 |
| Mexican Albums (Top 100 Mexico) | 4 |
| New Zealand Albums (RMNZ) | 1 |
| Norwegian Albums (VG-lista) | 2 |
| Portuguese Albums (AFP) | 8 |
| Scottish Albums (Official Charts) | 1 |
| South African Albums (RISA) | 4 |
| South Korean Albums (Gaon) | 12 |
| South Korean International Albums (Gaon) | 1 |
| Spanish Albums (Promusicae) | 4 |
| Swedish Albums (Sverigetopplistan) | 8 |
| Swiss Albums (Schweizer Hitparade) | 9 |
| UK Albums (Official Charts) | 1 |
| US Billboard 200 | 1 |
| US Top Country Albums (Billboard) | 1 |

2019–2024 weekly chart performance
| Chart (2019–2024) | Peak position |
|---|---|
| Austrian Albums (Ö3 Austria) | 4 |
| Croatian International Albums (HDU) | 4 |
| German Albums (Offizielle Top 100) | 8 |
| Greek Albums (IFPI) | 1 |
| Hungarian Physical Albums (MAHASZ) | 33 |
| Swiss Albums (Schweizer Hitparade) | 7 |
| US Independent Albums (Billboard) | 3 |

=== Year-end charts ===
2012 year-end charts
| Chart (2012) | Position |
|---|---|
| Australian Albums (ARIA) | 7 |
| Canadian Albums (Billboard) | 10 |
| Danish Albums (Hitlisten) | 84 |
| Japanese Albums (Oricon) | 64 |
| Mexican Albums (AMPROFON) | 56 |
| New Zealand Albums (RMNZ) | 6 |
| South Korean International Albums (Gaon) | 36 |
| UK Albums (OCC) | 42 |
| US Billboard 200 | 4 |
| US Top Country Albums (Billboard) | 1 |

2013 year-end charts
| Chart (2013) | Position |
|---|---|
| Australian Albums (ARIA) | 24 |
| Belgian Albums (Ultratop Flanders) | 140 |
| Canadian Albums (Billboard) | 8 |
| Japanese Albums (Oricon) | 38 |
| Japanese Albums (Billboard Japan) | 60 |
| French Albums (SNEP) | 194 |
| New Zealand Albums (RMNZ) | 17 |
| South Korean International Albums (Gaon) | 98 |
| UK Albums (OCC) | 27 |
| US Billboard 200 | 2 |
| US Top Country Albums (Billboard) | 1 |

2014 year-end charts
| Chart (2014) | Position |
|---|---|
| Australian Albums (ARIA) | 96 |
| Chinese Albums (Sino Chart) | 18 |
| South Korean International Albums (Gaon) | 86 |
| US Billboard 200 | 106 |
| US Top Country Albums (Billboard) | 24 |

2015 year-end charts
| Chart (2015) | Position |
|---|---|
| Japanese Albums (Billboard Japan) | 94 |
| US Billboard 200 | 111 |

2017 year-end charts
| Chart (2017) | Position |
|---|---|
| US Top Country Albums (Billboard) | 48 |

2018 year-end charts
| Chart (2018) | Position |
|---|---|
| US Top Country Albums (Billboard) | 28 |

2019 year-end charts
| Chart (2019) | Position |
|---|---|
| US Top Country Albums (Billboard) | 25 |

2020 year-end charts
| Chart (2020) | Position |
|---|---|
| US Top Country Albums (Billboard) | 25 |

2021 year-end charts
| Chart (2021) | Position |
|---|---|
| Austrian Albums (Ö3 Austria) | 70 |
| US Independent Albums (Billboard) | 28 |
| US Top Country Albums (Billboard) | 15 |

2022 year-end charts
| Chart (2022) | Position |
|---|---|
| US Top Country Albums (Billboard) | 62 |

2024 year-end chart
| Chart (2024) | Position |
|---|---|
| Australian Country Albums (ARIA) | 33 |

=== Decade-end charts ===
2010s decade-end charts
| Chart (2010–2019) | Position |
|---|---|
| Australian Albums (ARIA) | 23 |
| UK Albums (OCC) | 96 |
| US Billboard 200 | 32 |
| US Top Country Albums (Billboard) | 11 |

=== All-time charts ===
All-time charts
| Chart | Position |
|---|---|
| US Billboard 200 (Note: Compiled by Billboard for albums 1963–2015) | 140 |
| US Billboard 200 (Women) (Note: Compiled by Billboard for albums 1963–2017) | 37 |
| US Top Country Albums (Billboard) (Note: Compiled by Billboard for albums 1963–2016) | 72 |

== Certifications ==
Certifications, with pure sales where available
| Region | Certification | Certified units/sales |
|---|---|---|
| Australia (ARIA) | 5× Platinum | 350,000^{‡} |
| Austria (IFPI Austria) | Platinum | 20,000^{*} |
| Belgium (BRMA) | 2× Platinum | 60,000^{‡} |
| Brazil (Pro-Música Brasil) | Gold | 20,000^{*} |
| Canada (Music Canada) | 4× Platinum | 320,000^{^} |
| Colombia | Gold | |
| Denmark (IFPI Danmark) | Platinum | 20,000^{‡} |
| France (SNEP) | Gold | 50,000^{‡} |
| Germany (BVMI) | Platinum | 200,000^{‡} |
| Ireland (IRMA) | Platinum | 15,000^{^} |
| Japan (RIAJ) | Platinum | 250,000^{^} |
| Japan (RIAJ) Digital download | Gold | 100,000^{*} |
| Mexico (AMPROFON) | Gold | 30,000^{^} |
| New Zealand (RMNZ) | 6× Platinum | 90,000^{‡} |
| Poland (ZPAV) | Platinum | 20,000^{‡} |
| Singapore (RIAS) | 2× Platinum | 20,000^{*} |
| Sweden (GLF) | Gold | 20,000^{‡} |
| Switzerland (IFPI Switzerland) | Platinum | 30,000^{‡} |
| United Kingdom (BPI) | 3× Platinum | 900,000^{‡} |
| United States (RIAA) | 8× Platinum | 8,000,000^{‡} |
^{*} Sales figures based on certification alone.^{^} Shipments figures based on certification alone.^{‡} Sales+streaming figures based on certification alone.

== See also ==
- List of Billboard 200 number-one albums of 2012
- List of Billboard 200 number-one albums of 2013
- List of Billboard Top Country Albums number ones of 2012
- List of Billboard Top Country Albums number ones of 2013
- List of number-one albums of 2012 (Australia)
- List of number-one albums of 2012 (Canada)
- List of number-one albums from the 2010s (New Zealand)
- List of UK Albums Chart number ones of the 2010s
