= Treacherous (song) =

2012 song by Taylor Swift

Song by Taylor Swift

from the album Red
- Released: October 22, 2012
- Studio: Ballroom West (Los Angeles); Instrument Landing (Minneapolis); Marlay (North Hollywood)
- Genre: Folk; arena rock
- Length: 4:02
- Label: Big Machine
- Songwriters: Taylor Swift; Dan Wilson
- Producer: Dan Wilson

Audio video
- "Treacherous" on YouTube

"Treacherous" is a song by the American singer-songwriter Taylor Swift from her fourth studio album, Red (2012). She wrote the track with its producer, Dan Wilson. Blending styles of country and pop, "Treacherous" is a slow-burning folk and arena rock ballad that builds up into a finale. Its lyrics are about a narrator's attempt to protect a fragile and dangerous relationship. A demo of "Treacherous" was included in the tracklist of Red's deluxe edition.

Music critics selected "Treacherous" as an album highlight, commending Swift's songwriting and the production. Retrospectively, they have regarded it as one of Swift's better songs. The track peaked at number two on the US Bubbling Under Hot 100 and number 65 on the Canadian Hot 100. Swift included it in the set list of the Red Tour (2013–2014) and performed it on select dates of the Reputation Stadium Tour (2018) and the Eras Tour (2023–2024).

A re-recorded version, titled "Treacherous (Taylor's Version)", was released as part of Swift's second re-recorded album, Red (Taylor's Version) (2021). It peaked at number 42 on the Billboard Global 200 and reached the national charts of Australia, Canada, Singapore, and the United States.

== Production and release ==
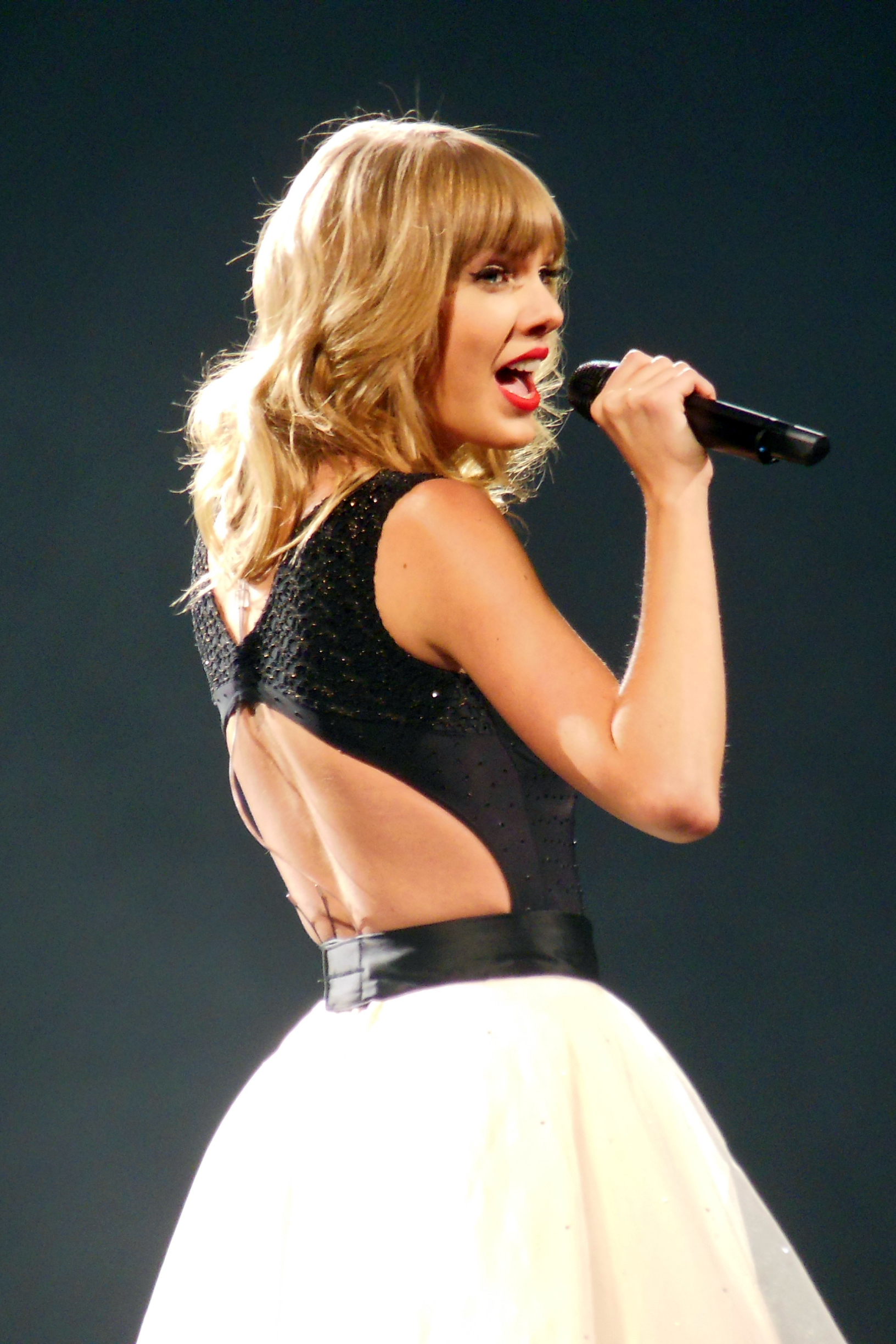
Swift performing "Treacherous" on the Red Tour

Taylor Swift solely wrote her third studio album, Speak Now (2010), and co-produced it with long-time collaborator Nathan Chapman; it expands the country pop production of its 2008 predecessor Fearless. On the album's follow-up, titled Red, Swift wanted to experiment with other musical styles. She approached producers outside of her career base in Nashville, Tennessee. In an interview with USA Today, Swift said that she chose the producers because she liked their style and wanted to learn from them. One of them was Dan Wilson, whom Swift was inspired to work with because of his work with the Minneapolis-based rock band Semisonic. Their sessions resulted in two songs for Red, which were "Come Back... Be Here" and "Treacherous".

"Treacherous" has a duration of four minutes and two seconds. In an interview with Taste of Country, Swift stated that the track was inspired by a conflicted feeling of being at risk every time you fall in love. It was written alongside a number of other songs due to bursts of productivity; Swift and Wilson wrote the song in ten minutes in his studio, with Swift "full of excitement" according to Wilson. He was impressed with Swift for the clarity in her songwriting and noted that she had "a very high level of positivity", which he deemed rare. The song was recorded at Ballroom West in Los Angeles, Instrument Landing in Minneapolis, and Marlay Studio in North Hollywood, Los Angeles. It was mixed at Larrabee Studios in Universal City, California, and was mastered at MasterMix in Nashville.

"Treacherous" was released as the third track on Red on October 22, 2012, by Big Machine Records. A demo of the song was also released as a deluxe-edition bonus track. In the United States, "Treacherous" peaked at number two on the Bubbling Under Hot 100 and number 26 on Hot Country Songs. It also reached number 65 on the Canadian Hot 100. Before the album's release, on August 13, Swift performed an acoustic rendition for a YouTube Webchat session held in Nashville. To promote Red, Swift embarked on the Red Tour (2013–2014), and included "Treacherous" on the set list. She performed the track as a "surprise song" on select dates of the Reputation Stadium Tour (Philadelphia, July 2018) and the Eras Tour (Tampa, April 2023; Paris, May 2024).

== Music and lyrics ==
"Treacherous"
"Treacherous" is a folk ballad that blends country and pop styles and features a crescendo towards the end.

"Treacherous" is a slow-burning ballad that combines folk and arena rock with country and pop styles. It starts with mandolin, slow guitar strums, and percussion. As the acoustic and electric guitar intertwine, background vocals harmonize at each iteration of the refrain. Towards the end, the song builds up into a finale that Mary Kate Carr from The A.V. Club described as "complementary crescendo that could sweep anyone away". For Pitchfork, Ivy Nelson wrote that whereas the beginning is "relatively motionless, frozen in time by all the tension in Swift's voice", as the track progresses, "the guitars and drums melt into dark, wet echoes like pelting raindrops". Sam Lansky from Idolator likened the production to that of U2's song "With or Without You" (1987), specifically due to the "aching guitars".

The lyrics are about a narrator's attempt to protect a fragile and dangerous relationship that has broken. On the song's meaning, Swift said, "[...] I tend to feel like when you're looking back on the things that have hurt you in life, I look back on them and think if it made you feel something, it was worth it." Some critics noted the lyrics, "I'll do anything you say / If you say it with your hands", as the first time Swift explicitly incorporated sexuality in her lyrics. Chris Willman from The Hollywood Reporter compared its narrative to that of Sheryl Crow's "My Favorite Mistake" (1998) and attributed its sensuality partly to Swift's "nearly whispered vocals", which convey "the tentativeness of her sensuality in falling for a bad boy".

== Critical reception ==
Several critics picked "Treacherous" as a highlight from Red. Willman said that it contains some of the most poetic lyrics on the album, and Lansky considered its musical direction an example of Swift's "diversions into sonic experimentation that wouldn't fare as well on the radio, and they feel even more exciting". American Songwriter's Jewly Hight selected it as one of the tracks that showcase Swift's talents at capturing emotions in tangible detail. Nelson labeled the song a "masterclass in dynamics from arrangement to lyric", and highlighted how the production complements the lyrical sentiments. Jonathan Keefe of Slant Magazine was impressed by Swift's songwriting for "expressing genuine insights into complex relationship dynamics". Mesfin Fekadu from the Associated Press considered the song "a good one" from an album that he deemed mediocre. In a less positive review, Billboard said that the instrumental build-up "steers away from the hushed, confessional beauty" of the initial verses.

In retrospective reviews, critics have considered "Treacherous" one of Swift's better songs. Rob Sheffield of Rolling Stone said that she "braves the ski slopes of love, with a seething acoustic guitar that finally detonates halfway though". The musicologist James E. Perone deemed its musical approach an evidence of "increased maturity in Swift's work as a songwriter and performer". Billboard's Hannah Dailey said the song has "some of her most gorgeous poetry" and thought it was "overlooked by the general masses". Sputnikmusic was amazed by Swift for her reflections of love and life on Red, and cited "Treacherous" as an example because of how she "vividly captured forbidden lust and temptation". Time ranked the song as the album's second-best track—Samantha Cooney considered the song "criminally underrated", and Annabel Gutterman said it was a "gorgeous song" and a "beautiful ballad about risking your heart when you know things might end badly". Alex Hopper from American Songwriter deemed "Treacherous" a highpoint from Red, and Michael Savio of PopMatters selected it as one of Swift's "finest, most pensive" songs.

== Personnel ==
Credits are adapted from the liner notes of Red.

- Taylor Swift – lead vocals, songwriting, acoustic guitar, background vocals
- Dan Wilson – songwriting, production, background vocals, electric guitar, bass, piano
- Andy Thompson – electric piano, synth strings, guitar, recording
- Aaron Sterling – drums
- Manny Marroquin – mixing
- Chris Galland – mixing assistance
- Delbert Bowers – mixing assistance
- Hank Williams – mastering
- John Rausch – recording
- Eric Robinson – recording

== Charts ==
Chart performance for "Treacherous"
Chart (2012)	Peak position
Canada Hot 100 (Billboard)	65
US Hot Country Songs (Billboard)	26
US Bubbling Under Hot 100 (Billboard)	2

== "Treacherous (Taylor's Version)" ==
"Treacherous (Taylor's Version)"

Song by Taylor Swift

from the album Red (Taylor's Version)
- Released: November 12, 2021
- Studio: Ballroom West (Los Angeles); Instrument Landing (Minneapolis)
- Length: 4:02
- Label: Republic
- Songwriters: Taylor Swift; Dan Wilson
- Producer: Dan Wilson

Lyric video
- "Treacherous (Taylor's Version)" on YouTube

After a dispute with Big Machine over the sale of the master recordings of Swift's first six studio albums, she re-recorded Red as Red (Taylor's Version). It was released by Republic Records as Swift's second re-recorded album on November 12, 2021; the re-recorded version of "Treacherous" is titled "Treacherous (Taylor's Version)". It has the same length as the original, and Wilson returned as the producer. The song was recorded at Ballroom West, Instrument Landing, and Sterloid Sounds. Swift's vocals were recorded at Kitty Committee Studio in Belfast, Northern Ireland. The track was mixed at MixStar Studios in Virginia Beach, Virginia, and was mastered at Sterling Sound in Edgewater, New Jersey. The re-recorded track is musically identical to the original recording, like the rest of Red (Taylor's Version), but with a more mature voice from Swift. The A.V. Club's Mary Kate Carr said that "Treacherous (Taylor's Version)" introduced a "haunting, newly mature singer-songwriter vibe" to Swift's artistry.

Upon the album's release, "Treacherous (Taylor's Version)" debuted at number 42 on the Billboard Global 200 and reached the national charts of Singapore (30), Australia (38), and Canada (41). In the United States, the song reached number 54 on the Billboard Hot 100 and number 15 on Hot Country Songs. It also peaked at number 67 on the United Kingdom's Audio Streaming Chart. "Treacherous (Taylor's Version)" received a gold certification in Australia.

=== Personnel ===
Credits are adapted from the liner notes of Red (Taylor's Version).

- Taylor Swift – lead vocals, background vocals, songwriting
- Dan Wilson – background vocals, songwriting, production, guitars, bass
- Andy Thompson – keyboards, electric guitar, recording
- Aaron Sterling – programming, drums, percussion, recording
- Sara Mulford – piano, synth, recording
- Serban Ghenea – mixing
- Bryce Bordone – mix engineering
- Randy Merrill – mastering
- Christopher Rowe – vocal recording
- John Mark Nelson – recording

=== Charts ===
Chart performance for "Treacherous (Taylor's Version)"
Chart (2021)	Peak position
Australia (ARIA)	38
Canada Hot 100 (Billboard)	41
Global 200 (Billboard)	42
Singapore (RIAS)	30
UK Audio Streaming (Official Charts)	67
US Billboard Hot 100	54
US Hot Country Songs (Billboard)	15

=== Certification ===
Certification for "Treacherous (Taylor's Version)"
Region	Certification	Certified units/sales
Australia (ARIA)	Gold	35,000^{‡}
^{‡} Sales+streaming figures based on certification alone.
