= List of Top Country Albums number ones of 2012 =

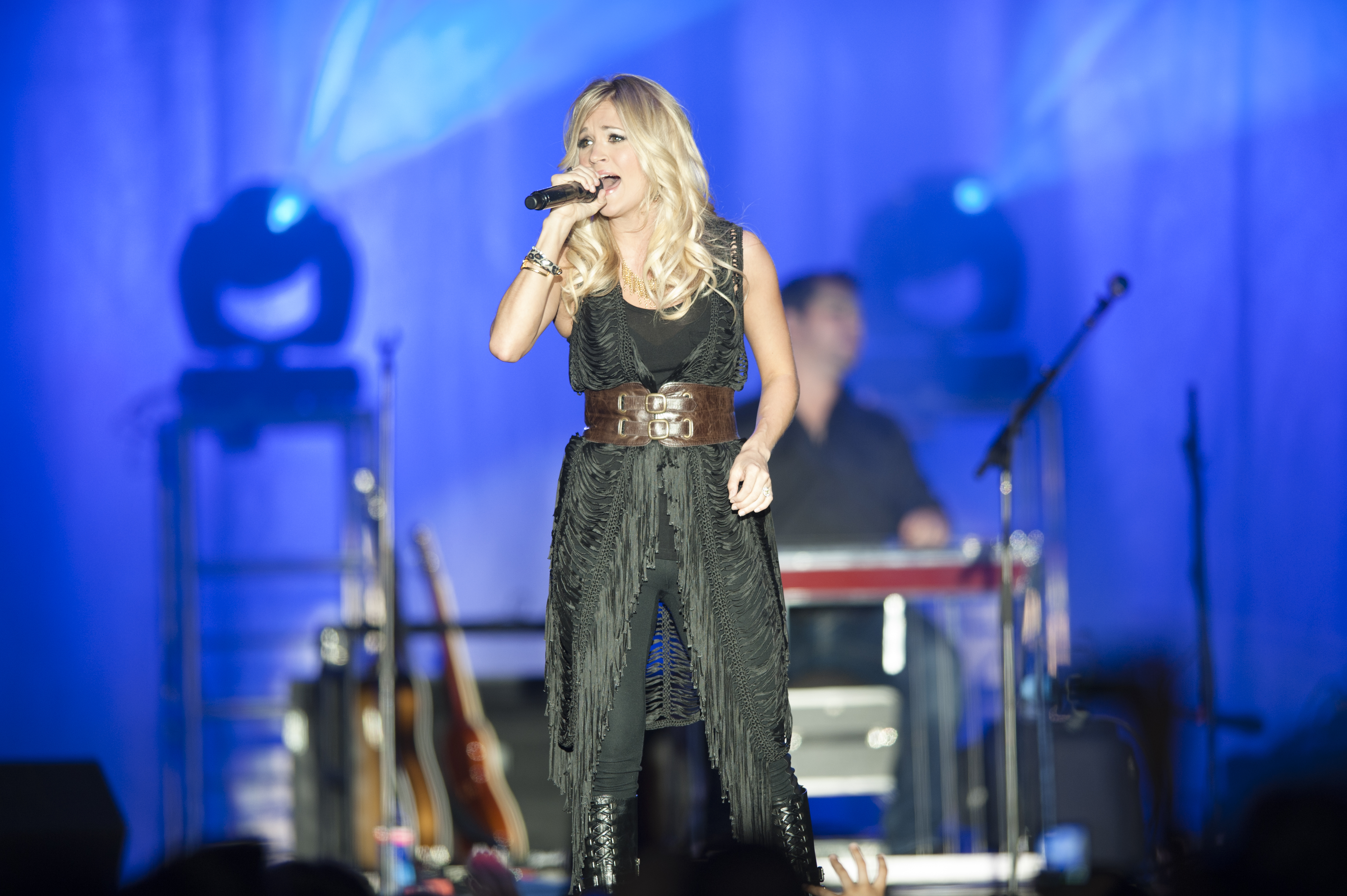
Carrie Underwood spent seven weeks at number one with Blown Away.

Top Country Albums is a chart that ranks the top-performing country music albums in the United States, published by Billboard. In 2012, 17 different albums topped the chart; placings were based on electronic point of sale data from retail outlets.

In the issue of Billboard dated January 7, the band Lady Antebellum held the top spot with Own the Night, the album's sixth week in the top spot. It occupied the peak position for the first four weeks of 2012 before being displaced by Toby Keith's Clancy's Tavern and subsequently returned to number one for a further four weeks beginning in the issue dated March 3. It tied for the highest total number of weeks spent at number one during the year with Taylor Swift's Red, which reached number one in the issue of Billboard dated November 10 and remained there for the final eight weeks of the year. The album would prove to be Swift's last entry on the Top Country Albums chart for nearly a decade, as she moved away from the country music genre with her subsequent releases. Carrie Underwood came closest to matching the two acts' time at number one, spending seven non-consecutive weeks atop the listing with Blown Away.

Three acts reached number one in 2012 for the first time, beginning with Lionel Richie, who topped the chart in April with Tuskegee, only the second album of his 30-year solo career to enter the country albums listing. Throughout his career with the Commodores and as a solo artist, spanning five decades, Richie was initially associated with the soul genre and later known for pop ballads, but in 2012 he recorded Tuskegee, an album of duets with country singers, which was a success on both the pop and country charts. In late August, country-rap artist Colt Ford reached the top spot for the first time with Declaration of Independence, and two weeks later Dustin Lynch made his first appearance at number one with his self-titled debut album. Lynch, along with fellow 2012 chart-toppers Luke Bryan and Jason Aldean, was associated with the so-called bro-country style, an emerging sub-genre which incorporated influences from rock music and hip hop and often featured lyrics relating to partying, attractive young women, and pick-up trucks.

== Chart history ==
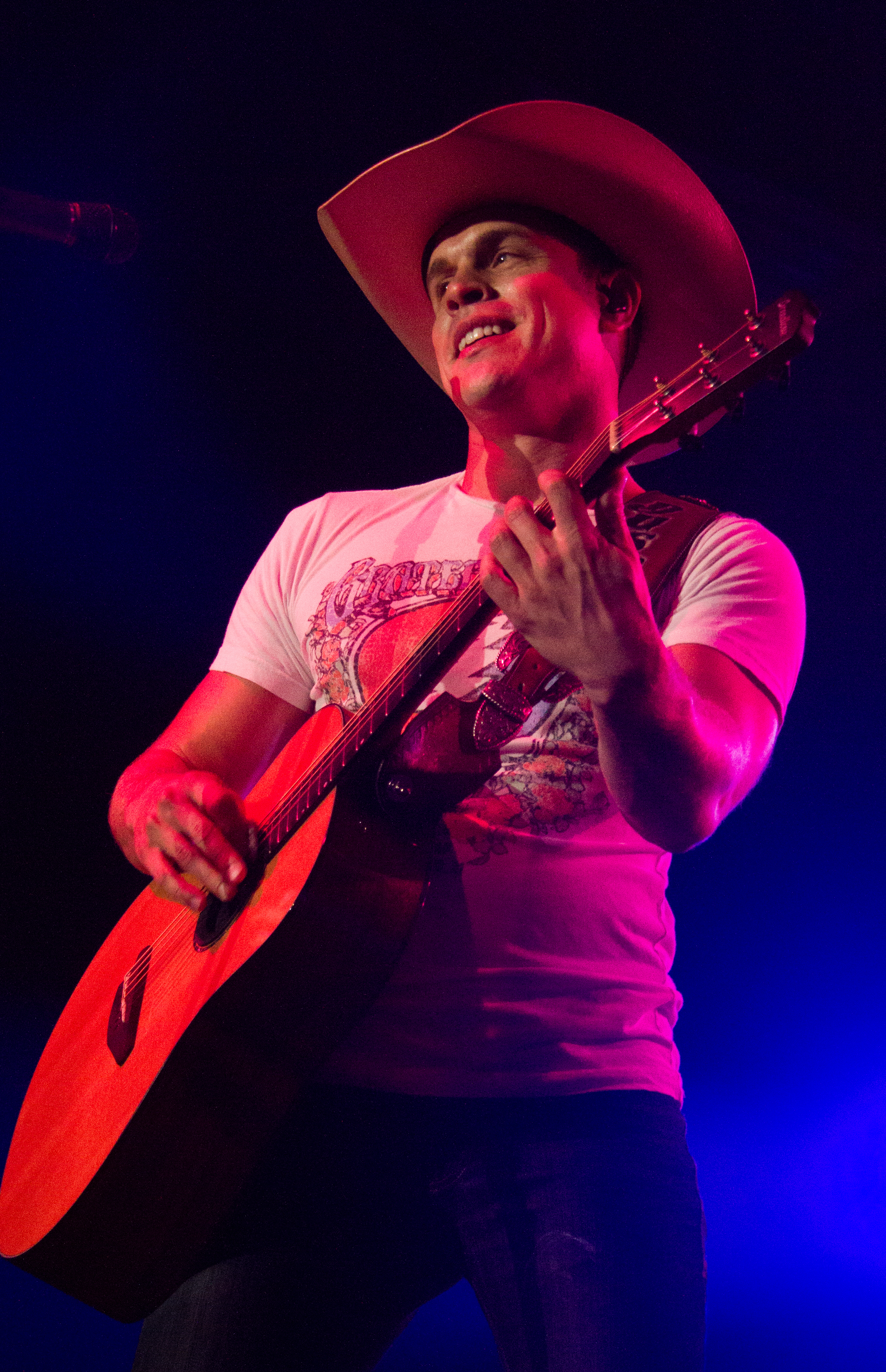
Dustin Lynch topped the chart with his self-titled album.

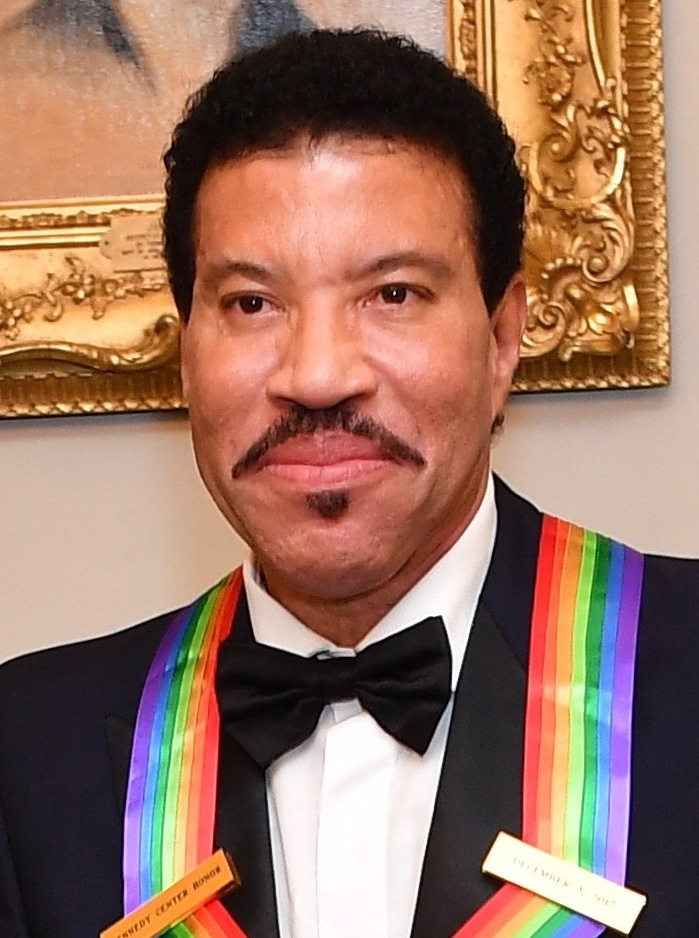
Veteran singer Lionel Richie, most associated with the soul genre and known for his ballads, had his first number-one country album in 2012.

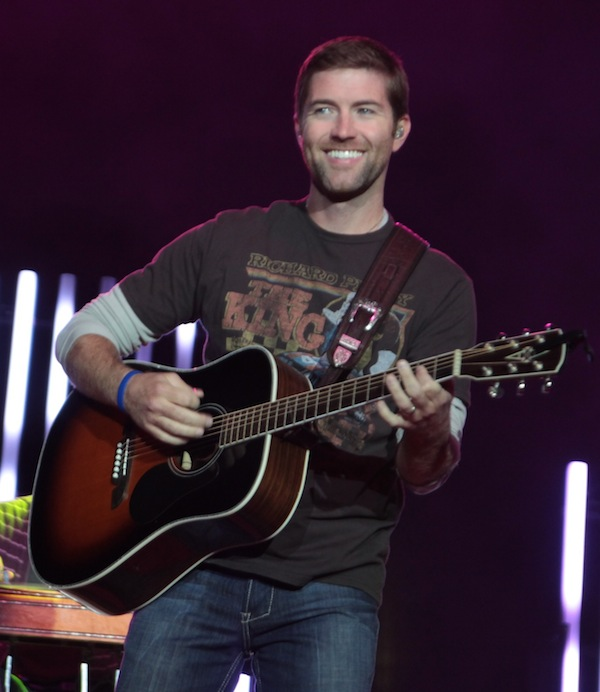
Josh Turner topped the chart with Punching Bag.

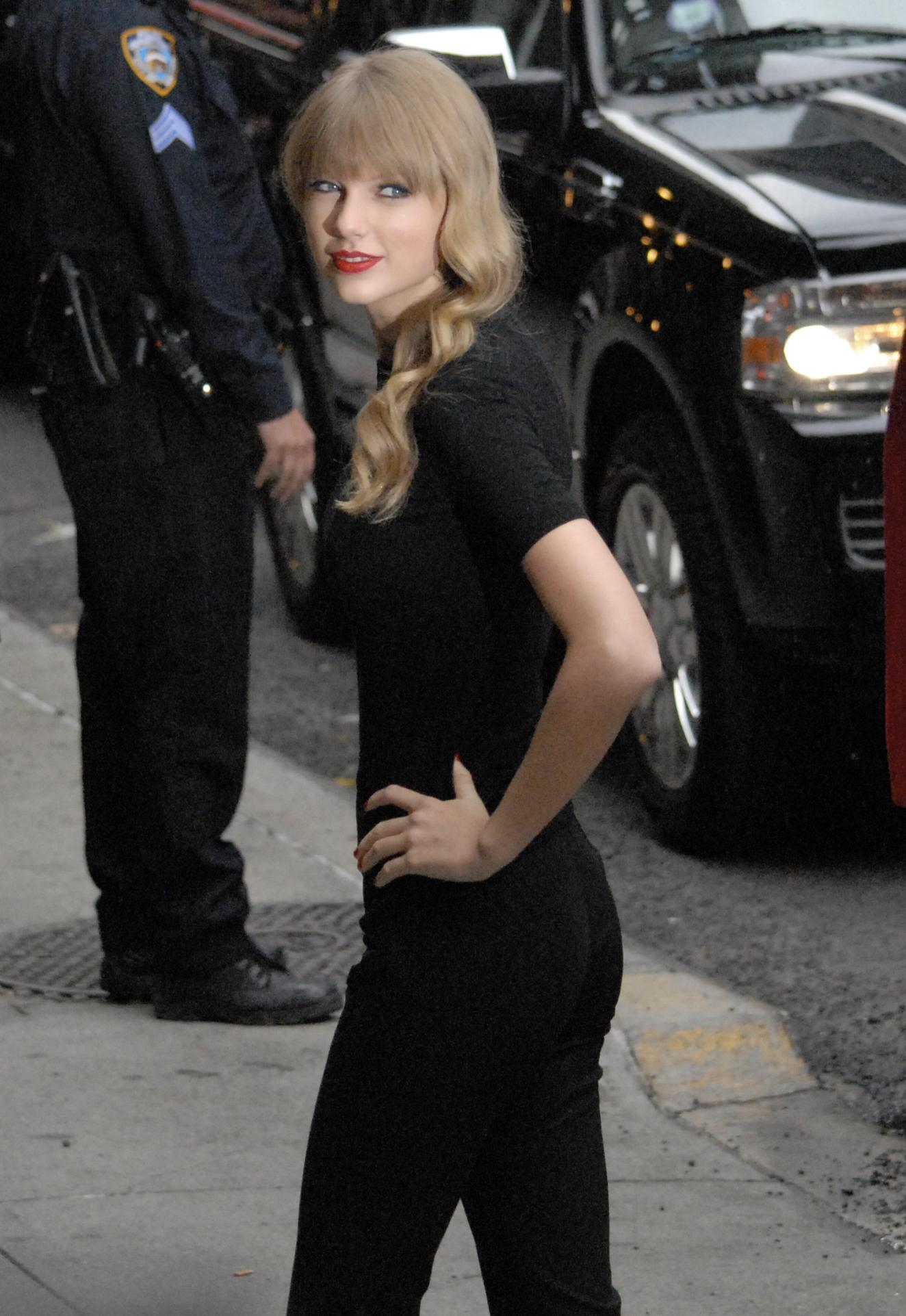
Taylor Swift ended the year at number one.

Issue date	Title	Artist(s)	Ref.
January 7	Own the Night	Lady Antebellum	
January 14	Own the Night	Lady Antebellum	
January 21	Own the Night	Lady Antebellum	
January 28	Own the Night	Lady Antebellum	
February 4	Clancy's Tavern	Toby Keith	
February 11	Emotional Traffic	Tim McGraw	
February 18	Emotional Traffic	Tim McGraw	
February 25	Home	Dierks Bentley	
March 3	Own the Night	Lady Antebellum	
March 10	Own the Night	Lady Antebellum	
March 17	Own the Night	Lady Antebellum	
March 24	Own the Night	Lady Antebellum	
March 31	Tailgates & Tanlines	Luke Bryan	
April 7	Tailgates & Tanlines	Luke Bryan	
April 14	Tuskegee	Lionel Richie	
April 21	Changed	Rascal Flatts	
April 28	Tuskegee	Lionel Richie	
May 5	Tuskegee	Lionel Richie	
May 12	Tuskegee	Lionel Richie	
May 19	Blown Away	Carrie Underwood	
May 26	Blown Away	Carrie Underwood	
June 2	Blown Away	Carrie Underwood	
June 9	Blown Away	Carrie Underwood	
June 16	Blown Away	Carrie Underwood	
June 23	Thirty Miles West	Alan Jackson	
June 30	Punching Bag	Josh Turner	
July 7	Welcome to the Fishbowl	Kenny Chesney	
July 14	Welcome to the Fishbowl	Kenny Chesney	
July 21	Welcome to the Fishbowl	Kenny Chesney	
July 28	Uncaged	Zac Brown Band	
August 4	Uncaged	Zac Brown Band	
August 11	Uncaged	Zac Brown Band	
August 18	Uncaged	Zac Brown Band	
August 25	Declaration of Independence	Colt Ford	
September 1	Uncaged	Zac Brown Band	
September 8	Dustin Lynch	Dustin Lynch	
September 15	Blown Away	Carrie Underwood	
September 22	Blown Away	Carrie Underwood	
September 29	Tornado	Little Big Town	
October 6	Tornado	Little Big Town	
October 13	Tornado	Little Big Town	
October 20	Tornado	Little Big Town	
October 27	Tornado	Little Big Town	
November 3	Night Train	Jason Aldean	
November 10	Red	Taylor Swift	
November 17	Red	Taylor Swift	
November 24	Red	Taylor Swift	
December 1	Red	Taylor Swift	
December 8	Red	Taylor Swift	
December 15	Red	Taylor Swift	
December 22	Red	Taylor Swift	
December 29	Red	Taylor Swift	
