= Should've Said No =

2008 single by Taylor Swift

Single by Taylor Swift

from the album Taylor Swift
- Released: May 19, 2008
- Studio: Dark Horse Recording (Franklin, Tennessee)
- Genre: Country rock; pop rock; stadium rock
- Length: 4:04
- Label: Big Machine
- Songwriter: Taylor Swift
- Producer: Nathan Chapman

Taylor Swift singles chronology
"Picture to Burn" (2008)	"Should've Said No" (2008)	"Love Story" (2008)

Music video
- "Should've Said No" on YouTube

"Should've Said No" is a song written and recorded by the American singer-songwriter Taylor Swift for her debut studio album, Taylor Swift (2006). The song was released to US country radio as the album's fifth and final single on May 19, 2008, by Big Machine Records. Produced by Nathan Chapman, "Should've Said No" combines country rock, pop rock, and stadium rock with banjo and distorted guitars. The lyrics are about Swift's contempt for a cheating ex-lover.

Music critics praised the song's production and Swift's songwriting. "Should've Said No" was Swift's second number-one single on the Hot Country Songs chart and peaked at number 33 on the Billboard Hot 100. The single was certified platinum, for exceeding one million digital copies sold, by the Recording Industry Association of America (RIAA). It entered the singles charts in Canada and New Zealand.

Swift performed "Should've Said No" live at the 43rd Academy of Country Music Awards; the performance was recorded and released as the official music video. The song was also included in the set list of her first headlining tour, the Fearless Tour (2009–2010). She also sang the song as a guest star on the Jonas Brothers' Burnin' Up Tour; the performance was featured in the concert film Jonas Brothers: The 3D Concert Experience. In 2018, she included a mashup of "Should've Said No" and "Bad Blood" in the set list of her Reputation Stadium Tour (2018).

== Background and writing ==
"Should've Said No" was a last-minute addition to Taylor Swift's first album project; she wrote it two days before the album was mastered and published, working on it overnight with the producer Nathan Chapman. She said she wrote it as a reaction to something "dramatic and crazy" that happened to her, and she felt that she needed "to address it in the form of music". The first line that came to her was the title, and she wrote the refrain in five minutes. Swift said that many of the lyrics were based on actual words that she used when confronting her ex-boyfriend. The whole song took her 20 minutes to compose. Swift commented that "Should've Said No" and "Picture to Burn" are the two songs on the album that depict a vengeful attitude towards those who wronged her; whereas "Picture to Burn" has an angry attitude, "Should've Said No" is "more of a moral statement. It's an 'I love you, we were awesome and great together, but you messed this up and I would still be with you' kinda thing. You said yes, and you should've said no."

== Music and lyrics ==
"Should've Said No" is an uptempo country rock song that incorporates a banjo and opens with a steel guitar riff. It is written in the key of E minor. Swift's lead vocals range from G_{3} to C_{5}. Roger Holland of PopMatters categorized the track as pop rock and said that the country-music arrangement was minimal. Brittany Spanos from Rolling Stone remarked that "Should've Said No" stands out as a pop-rock-leaning tune in a country-music album. In The Guardian, Alexis Petridis described it as a "post-grunge stadium rock anthem". Musicologist James E. Perone commented that "Should've Said No" features a production incorporating textured guitars that resembles a rock power ballad, and includes elements of American folk music through the use of the pentatonic scale in the melody and the fiddles in unison with other instruments.

In the lyrics, the narrator chastises a cheating ex-boyfriend and tells him that she would have forgiven him if he had said no to the girl with whom he cheated on the narrator. She has no intention to get back with him, no matter how much he pleads. Before ending their relationship, the narrator asks the ex-boyfriend, "Before you go, tell me this: Was it worth it? Was she worth this?" to which she answers herself, "No," repeatedly. Some authors remarked that the song has an empowering message to young female listeners, who listen to Swift's music to find power to control their own lives. In The New York Times, Jon Caramanica wrote that the song is "a little vicious ... animated by something sharper than traditional teenage angst".

== Release and commercial performance ==
"Should've Said No" was the fifth and final single from Swift's debut album. It was released to US country radio on May 19, 2008, by Big Machine Records. An alternate version of the song was released on her extended play Beautiful Eyes (2008). A remix was included in the international edition of Swift's second studio album, Fearless, released in March 2009. In October 2019, following the Taylor Swift masters dispute, Big Machine Records re-released "Should've Said No", along with other singles from Swift's debut album, on limited-edition vinyl.

In the United States, the single peaked at number 33 on the Billboard Hot 100. It was Swift's second number-one single on the Hot Country Songs chart, following "Our Song"; both singles were solely written by Swift. It spent two weeks at number one on the Hot Country Songs chart. The song was certified platinum by the Recording Industry Association of America (RIAA) in 2009 and, by November 2017, had sold 1.5 million digital copies in the United States. "Should've Said No" also charted on the Canadian Hot 100 (peaking at number 67) and the Official New Zealand Music Chart (peaking at number 18).

== Critical reception ==
Roger Holland of PopMatters lauded the song's production and felt that it proved Swift's potential success beyond her country-music identity. Chris Neal of Country Weekly and Jon Caramanica of The New York Times both selected "Should've Said No" as one of the best songs on Swift's debut album. Reviewing the international edition of Fearless, Fiona Chua of MTV Asia selected the track as a highlight, lauding its upbeat production and emotional sentiments that resonated with many tween females. New Zealand magazine The Spinoff's Sam Brooke placed it at number five on a list of the best songs of 2009. The song was one of the 50 award-winning songs at the 2009 BMI Country Awards.

In retrospect, Ed Masley of The Arizona Republic considered "Should've Said No" one of the better songs in Swift's discography. Spanos picked it as one of Swift's 10 best deep cuts, deeming it a precedent to Swift's experimentation beyond country music that would later turn her into a household name. Jonathan Bradley from Billboard commented that the song's theme of anger set a precedent for some of Swift's later songs. On a less positive side, Valerie Megan of Consequence praised the production but criticized the lyrics as clunky.

== Live performances ==
Swift included "Should've Said No" in the set list of a promotional tour for her debut album in 2008. She sang the song as the opening act to Rascal Flatts' 2008 tour. Swift performed the song live at the 43rd Academy of Country Music Awards in May 2008. The performance was recorded and later released as the song's live music video. In the video, the performance begins with Swift playing the guitar in a hooded sweatshirt and jeans, and after an on-stage costume change, she is seen in a black dress. Swift sings the song and drapes her arm around the guitar player during a guitar solo. Towards the end, she performs the last lines of the song in the pouring rain onstage, and the crowd receives with a standing ovation. She also performed the song with Jonas Brothers on the Burnin' Up Tour; the performance is included in the concert film Jonas Brothers: The 3D Concert Experience (2009).

Swift included the song in the set list of her first headlining tour, the Fearless Tour (2009–2010). She later performed the song on select dates of the Red Tour (St. Louis, March 2013, East Rutherford, July 2013) the 1989 World Tour (Santa Clara, August 2015), and the Eras Tour (Foxborough, May 2023, Sydney, February 2024, mashup with "You're Not Sorry" (2008), Miami, October 2024, mashup with "I Did Something Bad" (2017)). On her 2018 Reputation Stadium Tour, she included a mashup of the song and "Bad Blood" in the set list.

== Personnel ==
Credits are adapted from the liner notes of Taylor Swift (2006).

- Taylor Swift – vocals, harmony vocals, songwriting
- Nathan Chapman – production, additional engineering, acoustic guitar, electric guitar, harmony vocals
- Chad Carlson – engineering, recording
- Jeremy Wheatley – additional recording engineering, additional mixing, additional programming
- Richard Edgeler – assistant engineering, assistant mixing
- Richard Adlam – additional programming
- Alexis Smith – additional programming
- Gordon Hammond – assistant engineering
- Jeff Balding – mixing
- John Wills – banjo
- Tim Marks – bass guitar
- Nick Buda – drums
- Rob Hajacos – fiddle
- Eric Darken – percussion
- Scotty Sanders – steel guitar

== Charts ==
=== Weekly charts ===
Weekly chart performance
Chart (2008–2009)	Peak position
Canada Hot 100 (Billboard)	67
Canada Country (Billboard)	5
New Zealand (Recorded Music NZ)	18
US Billboard Hot 100	33
US Hot Country Songs (Billboard)	1
US Pop 100 (Billboard)	61

=== Year-end charts ===
Year-end chart performance
Chart (2008)	Position
US Hot Country Songs (Billboard)	29

== Certifications ==
Certifications
Region	Certification	Certified units/sales
Australia (ARIA)	Gold	35,000^{‡}
New Zealand (RMNZ)	Gold	15,000^{‡}
United States (RIAA)	Platinum	1,000,000^{*}
^{*} Sales figures based on certification alone.^{‡} Sales+streaming figures based on certification alone.

== Release history ==
Release dates and formats
Region	Date	Format	Label	Ref.
United States	May 19, 2008	Country radio	Big Machine	
United States	October 24, 2019	7-inch vinyl	Big Machine	
