= A Place in This World =

2006 song by Taylor Swift

Song by Taylor Swift

from the album Taylor Swift
- Written: November 2003
- Released: October 24, 2006
- Studio: Castle-A; Sound Cottage (Nashville)
- Genre: Pop
- Length: 3:19
- Label: Big Machine
- Songwriters: Taylor Swift; Robert Ellis Orrall; Angelo Petraglia
- Producer: Nathan Chapman

Audio
- "A Place in This World" on YouTube

"A Place in This World" is a song by the American singer-songwriter Taylor Swift from her debut studio album, Taylor Swift (2006). She wrote it with Robert Ellis Orrall and Angelo Petraglia, while Nathan Chapman handled its production. Big Machine Records released it as the album's fourth track on October 24, 2006. It is a banjo–driven pop song and a sentimental ballad that features country and alternative rock influences. Swift wrote the track at thirteen after pondering if she would achieve success in her career.

Music critics generally praised "A Place in This World" for its songwriting and compared it to diary entries. They have retrospectively placed it in low positions in rankings of Swift's discography. She performed it on some dates of the Reputation Stadium Tour (2018) and the Eras Tour (2023–2024).

== Background and production ==
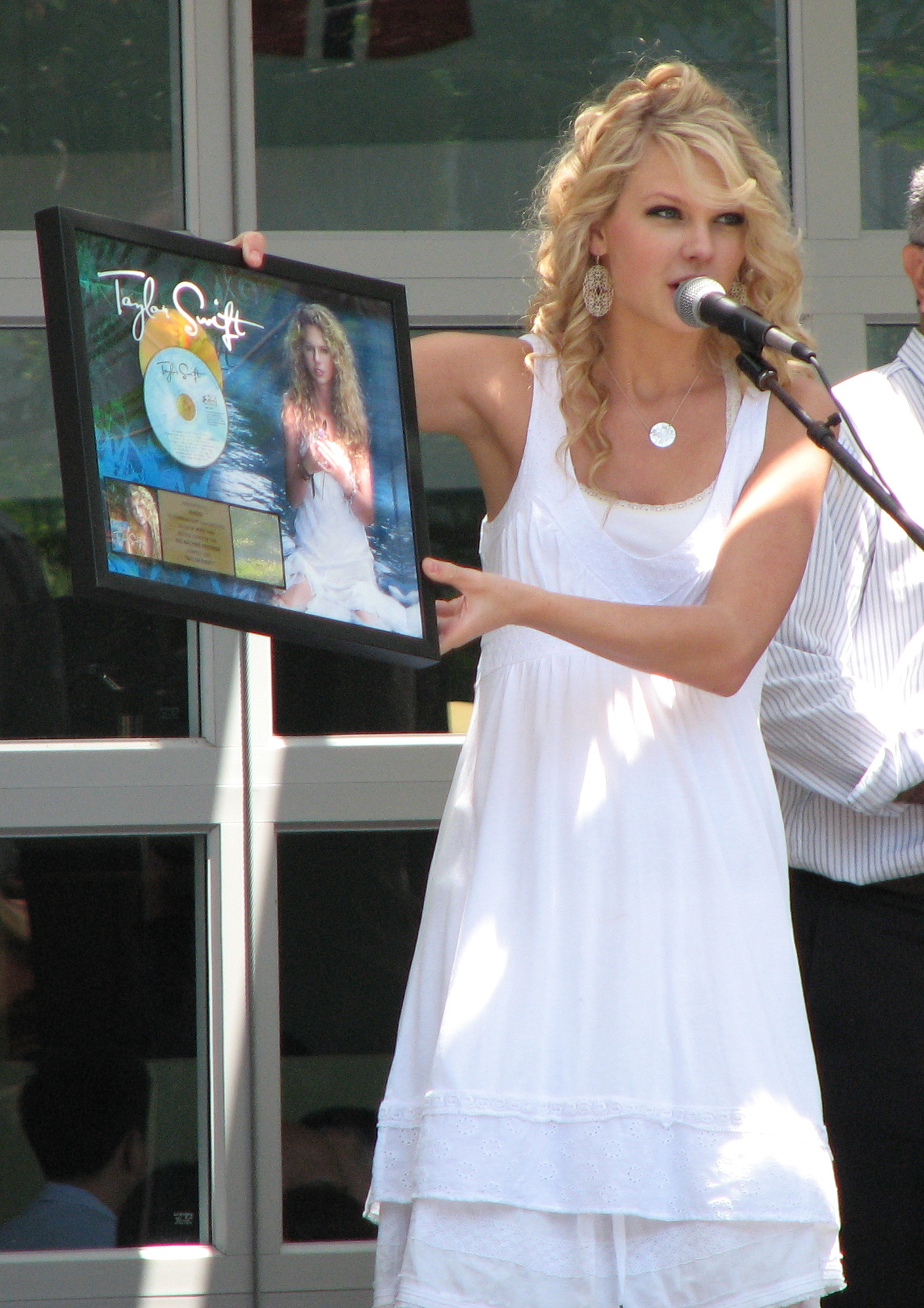
Swift promoting her debut studio album in 2007

In November 2003, Taylor Swift wrote the song "A Place in This World" at thirteen, while living in Pennsylvania and traveling regularly to Nashville, Tennessee, with her mother. The following year, she moved to Nashville to pursue a career in country music. She signed with Sony/ATV in 2004 to become a professional songwriter, and with Big Machine Records in 2005 to become a country music singer. Swift wrote the final version of "A Place in This World" with Robert Ellis Orrall and Angelo Petraglia, and recorded a demo on January 15, 2004. Near the end of 2005, Swift recorded her self-titled debut studio album with Nathan Chapman, who also produced the track. The album's working title was originally A Place in This World, before Swift decided to make it self-titled.

Swift played acoustic guitar and provided harmony vocals for "A Place in This World". Chapman played acoustic guitar and electric guitar, while contributing harmony vocals with his wife, Stephanie Chapman. Chad Carlson recorded the song at Castle-A Studios (Nashville), and provided additional recording with Chapman at Sound Cottage Studios (Nashville). The track was mixed by Chuck Ainlay at Masterfonics Studios (Nashville). Musicians who played instruments for "A Place in This World" include Nick Buda (drums), Tim Marks (bass guitar), Scotty Sanders (steel guitar), Eric Darken (percussion), Rob Hajacos (fiddle), and John Willis (mandolin).

== Music and lyrics ==
"A Place in This World"
A sample of "A Place in This World", a banjo–driven pop song with country and alternative rock influences

"A Place in This World" is 3 minutes and 19 seconds long. It is a banjo–driven pop song and a sentimental ballad, featuring country and alternative rock influences and a midtempo rhythm. "A Place in This World" begins with a guitar chord and incorporates an arpeggiated banjo and three guitars—a strumming acoustic guitar and two rhythmic electric guitars—in the first verse and pre-chorus. The chorus is accompanied by a steady drum beat, pedal steel guitars, and electric guitars; the second chorus additionally features an electric guitar solo. The bridge incorporates notes of tubular bells and tremolos of mandolins.

Swift was inspired to write the track by a television special about Faith Hill, who moved to Nashville to become a country singer, and wrote it after contemplating whether she would achieve success in her career. The lyrics are about her pursuit of stardom and uncertainty about the future ("Oh, I'm alone, on my own / And that's all I know / Oh, I'm just a girl / Trying to find a place in this world"). They shift from self-assurance to self-doubt ("I'll be strong / I'll be wrong / Oh, but life goes on") and reassure the listeners ("I'm not the only one who feels the way I do"). The musicologist James E. Perone found "A Place in This World" similar to Irene Cara's single "Flashdance... What a Feeling" (1983) in both theme and melody, and Vulture's Nate Jones compared it to Britney Spears's single "I'm Not a Girl, Not Yet a Woman" (2002) and the music of ABC Family shows.

== Release and live performances ==
Swift's debut studio album was released on October 24, 2006, through Big Machine Records; "A Place in This World" is the fourth song on the track listing. A performance recorded at an Apple store in SoHo, New York, was released as part of an iTunes–exclusive live extended play on January 15, 2008. The live version was later included on an international deluxe edition of Swift's second studio album, Fearless (2008).

Swift performed "A Place in This World" on acoustic guitar at the Chicago Country Music Festival on October 12, 2008, and played it at the San Antonio Stock Show & Rodeo on February 10, 2009. She sang an acoustic rendition of the track at the Pittsburgh show of the Reputation Stadium Tour on August 7, 2018; Rolling Stone's Andy Greene picked it as one of the ten best acoustic performances of the tour. Swift played the song on acoustic guitar at the second Houston show of the Eras Tour on April 22, 2023. She performed "A Place in This World" as part of a mashup with her single "New Romantics" (2016) at the final show of the Eras Tour in Vancouver on December 8, 2024. The performance was recorded and released as part of the concert film Taylor Swift: The Eras Tour: The Final Show, which premiered on December 12, 2025, through Disney+.

== Critical reception ==
Music critics praised "A Place in This World" for its songwriting and considered it a deep cut in Swift's discography. Rolling Stone's Rob Sheffield thought that it contained "seeds of greatness" although she was still making her debut as a country songwriter; he picked "I'll be strong / I'll be wrong / Oh, but life goes on" as his favorite lyric from the song. Billboard's Jonathan Bradley opined that the "searching naivety" of the track was expressed proficiently and drew parallels to the music of Lorde. NME's Hannah Mylrea felt the song was a peek into Swift's diary and thought that the opening line "I don't know what I want, so don't ask me" was a "wonderfully teenage" lyric. Billboard's Bobby Olivier and Andrew Unterberger deemed it a vulnerable song and similarly compared its lyrics to diary entries. "A Place in This World" appeared in rankings of Swift's discography by Paste's Jane Song (148 out of 158), Mylrea (130 out of 161), Jones (236 out of 245), and Sheffield (284 out of 286).

== Personnel ==
Credits are adapted from the liner notes of Taylor Swift.

- Taylor Swift – lead vocals, songwriter, acoustic guitar, harmony vocals
- Robert Ellis Orrall – songwriter
- Angelo Petraglia – songwriter
- Nathan Chapman – producer, additional recording engineer, acoustic guitar, electric guitar, harmony vocals
- Chad Carlson – recording engineer, additional recording engineer
- Steve Short – assistant recording engineer
- Chuck Ainlay – mixer
- Scott Kidd – assistant mixer
- Stephanie Chapman – harmony vocals
- Nick Buda – drums
- Tim Marks – bass guitar
- Scotty Sanders – steel guitar
- Eric Darken – percussion
- Rob Hajacos – fiddle
- John Willis – mandolin
