= Tim McGraw (song) =

2006 single by Taylor Swift

Single by Taylor Swift

from the album Taylor Swift
- Written: 2005
- Released: June 19, 2006
- Studio: Quad; Sound Cottage (Nashville)
- Genre: Country; country pop
- Length: 3:52
- Label: Big Machine
- Songwriters: Taylor Swift; Liz Rose
- Producer: Nathan Chapman

Taylor Swift singles chronology
"Tim McGraw" (2006)	"Teardrops on My Guitar" (2007)

Music video
- "Tim McGraw" on YouTube

"Tim McGraw" is the debut single by the American singer-songwriter Taylor Swift, released on June 19, 2006, by Big Machine Records. Swift wrote the song with Liz Rose for her debut studio album, Taylor Swift (2006). Produced by Nathan Chapman, "Tim McGraw" is an acoustic guitar-led country and country pop ballad that incorporates the '50s progression and features fiddle, mandolin, and Dobro guitar. The lyrics are about a summer romance that has passed: the narrator pleads with her ex-boyfriend to remember her every time he hears her favorite song by the country musician Tim McGraw, the track's namesake.

Music critics praised "Tim McGraw" for its engaging narrative with memorable details and nostalgia-inducing sentiments. Retrospective reviews have regarded the single as a blueprint for Swift's songwriting. Rolling Stone featured it on their lists "100 Greatest Debut Singles of All Time" (2020) and "200 Greatest Country Songs of All Time" (2024). In the United States, "Tim McGraw" peaked at number 40 on the Billboard Hot 100 and number six on Hot Country Songs. The track charted at number 10 on Canada Country and has received certifications in Australia and the United States.

Trey Fanjoy directed the music video, in which Swift's character and the ex-boyfriend reminisce about a past summer romance in rural Tennessee. Swift promoted "Tim McGraw" and her debut album with a six-month radio tour in 2006 and by opening for other country musicians' tours in 2006 and 2007. She performed the song at the 42nd Academy of Country Music Awards in 2007; included it in the set list of her first headlining tour, the Fearless Tour (2009–2010); and performed it on several dates of her later tours.

== Background and production ==
In 2004, Pennsylvania-born Taylor Swift moved to Nashville, Tennessee at 14 to pursue a career in country music. She signed a songwriting contract with Sony/ATV Music Publishing in 2004—the youngest signee in its history—and a recording contract with Big Machine Records in 2005. Swift spent four months near the end of 2005 recording her debut album, Taylor Swift; recording was wrapped by the time Swift had completed her freshman year of high school.

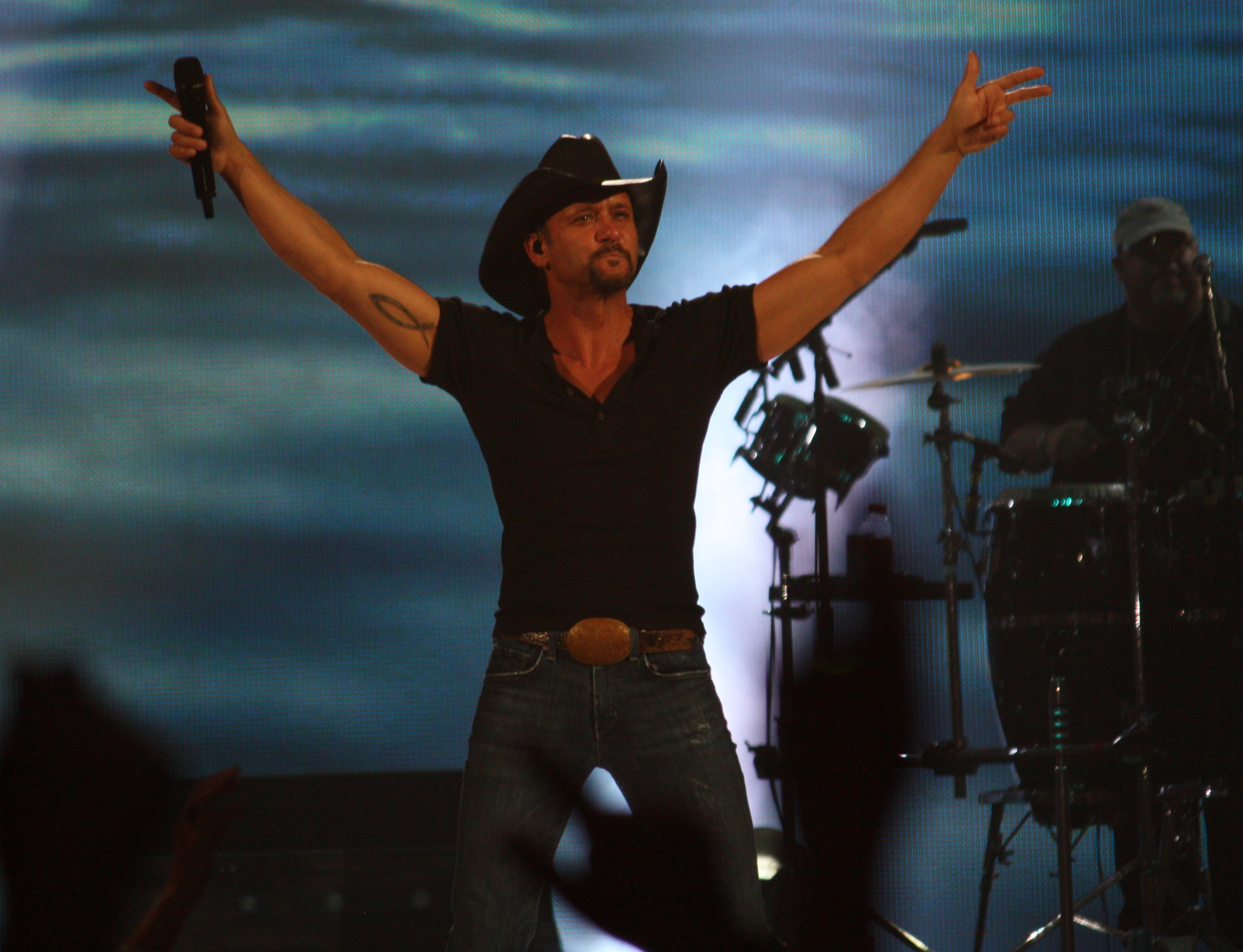
Tim McGraw (pictured in 2010), the song's namesake

Swift developed the idea for "Tim McGraw" during a math class at school and wrote it within 15 minutes. She thought about how her relationship with her senior boyfriend would end because he would leave for college: "I started thinking about all the things that I knew would remind him of me." After finishing school, she came to the Sony/ATV office to finish the song with co-writer Liz Rose; they completed the track on a piano. According to Rose, Swift came to her with "the idea and the melody, knowing exactly what she wanted". The two brainstormed ideas to polish the track, and the first thing that came to Swift was her love for Tim McGraw's music. The final lyrics contain several personal references, including Swift's favorite song of McGraw: "Can't Tell Me Nothin" from his 2004 album Live Like You Were Dying.

Swift initially titled the track "When You Think Tim McGraw", a decision that Rose considered "weird" but also "bold". She approached the producer Nathan Chapman to record the song. Chapman had produced demos for other artists in Nashville, and his studio was a converted one-car garage at the back of the Sony/ATV offices. Big Machine was skeptical of Chapman because he had not produced a commercial album, but Swift believed they had the "right chemistry". He said that when Swift first played the song to him, he was astonished by the emotional engagement and thought of the song as a refreshing way to depict a romance between two people. He arranged the instruments, played both acoustic and electric guitars, and sang background vocals; other instruments recorded for "Tim McGraw" include fiddle, mandolin, bass guitar, Dobro guitar, and drums.

== Release ==
In a meeting that Swift had with Big Machine's head Scott Borchetta to discuss which songs would be featured on her debut album, she performed "Tim McGraw" for Borchetta on ukulele. As soon as Swift finished singing it, Borchetta decided that it would be her first single. He suggested that Swift rename it "Tim McGraw", deeming it a move that could make fans of McGraw—a contemporary country "superstar"—immediately become curious in her name. Swift initially did not believe that "Tim McGraw" was an appropriate choice for a single, but she retrospectively reflected that it was a right decision. Big Machine released "Tim McGraw" to country radio in the United States on June 19, 2006. It is first on the track listing of Taylor Swift, released on October 24, 2006. After the 2019 dispute regarding the ownership of Swift's albums that Big Machine had released, "Tim McGraw" was reissued on 7-inch vinyl by Big Machine on August 16, 2019.

To promote the single, Swift spent mid-2006 sending promotional copies of "Tim McGraw" to country radio stations across the United States: "With every envelope that I would seal I would look at the address and the station on there and think, 'Please, please just listen to this one time.'" She also encouraged her fans via Myspace to request their local radio stations to play the song. Swift said that when the subject of "Tim McGraw" learned about the song, he thought it was "cool" and kept his friendship with her despite their breakup. In a 2021 interview with Apple Music, McGraw said that he initially had some reservations about the song ("Have I gotten to that age now to where they're singing songs about me? Does that mean I've jumped the shark a bit?"), but he ultimately enjoyed it and became friends with Swift.

In the United States, "Tim McGraw" debuted at number 60 on the Hot Country Songs chart dated July 1, 2006. It reached the top 10 of Hot Country Songs by December 2006 and peaked at number six on the chart dated January 27, 2007. On the Billboard Hot 100 chart, the single debuted at number 86 on the issue dated September 26, 2006, peaked at number 40 on January 13, 2007, and spent 20 weeks. It was one of the Award-Winning Songs at the 2007 Country Awards by Broadcast Music, Inc., which honored the most-played country songs on United States television and airplay of the year. The single had sold 1.6 million digital copies by November 2017 and was certified double platinum, for surpassing two million units based on sales and streaming, by the Recording Industry Association of America in March 2020. Elsewhere, the single peaked at number 10 on the Canada Country chart and has been certified gold in Australia.

== Music ==
"Tim McGraw" (2006)
"Tim McGraw" is a mid-tempo country ballad, driven by acoustic guitar. It follows the '50s progression and incorporates elements of alternative rock.

"Tim McGraw" is 3 minutes and 52 seconds long. It is a mid-tempo country and country pop ballad that is driven by a twelve-string guitar and incorporates fiddle, Dobro, and banjo. Swift sings in the low range of her soprano. Critics described the production of "Tim McGraw" as understated and simple. The music critic Annie Zaleski described the tones of the instruments as "wistful" and "keening".

Written in the key of C major, "Tim McGraw" uses the '50s progression (I—vi—IV—V; C—Am—F—G), which is associated with late-1950s and early-1960s doo-wop and rock and roll songs. The minor vi chord adds a sense of melancholy and wistfulness to the sound, as described by Zaleski and the musicologist James E. Perone. According to Perone, by using the '50s progression, "Tim McGraw" evokes classic hits such as Dolly Parton's "I Will Always Love You" (1974), the Marvelettes' "Please Mr. Postman" (1961), and Hoagy Carmichael's "Heart and Soul" (1938) and thus has a timeless feel to it.

The refrain, as described by Perone, is "motivically based"—each one of the melodic motif is built within a small pitch range. According to Perone, this, as well as the fact that the refrain is built on repetitions of the initial short motif, gives the song a catchy tune that makes the audience want to sing along to. Additionally, the refrain—and to a certain extent, the verses—uses syncopation at the sixteenth-note level, which lends the song a production reminiscent to non-country genres such as alternative rock and hip-hop.

== Lyrical interpretations ==
"Tim McGraw" is about a summer romance that has passed and left behind fleeting memories. In the opening lines, the narrator recalls how her ex-boyfriend deemed her eyes superior to "Georgia stars at night", a compliment that she deems exaggerated. She details the breakup in the second verse: although she spent September crying, she is relieved that the ex-boyfriend was not there to witness her mourning, for she believes that it will preserve the beautiful memories intact. In the refrain, the narrator pleads with him to remember her every time he hears a song by Tim McGraw that they once danced to at night. She mentions several other items and moments that she hopes will make him reminisce about their love: her little black dress, her faded blue jeans, the nature surrounding them the night they danced to the song, and the moment she laid her head on his chest. In the final verse, the narrator confesses that she has written him a letter detailing her hopes that he will remember her fondly.

While Swift wrote "Tim McGraw" envisioning the end of her relationship before it actually ended, its narrative incorporates motifs of memory and passage of time, which evoke nostalgic sentiments, in the views of critics; Maura Johnston of Pitchfork dubbed the song "saudade-drenched". Although the narrator wishes her ex-boyfriend to remember her, she knows she cannot control that and thus expresses her desire through repetitions of the phrase "I hope": "I hope it takes you back to that place", "I hope you think of me." According to the English-literature academic Maggie Laurel Boyd, "Tim McGraw" presents Swift's memories not only to the subject (her physical appearance, clothing items, and the McGraw song) but also to the audience (her mourning the breakup). In doing so, she demonstrates that memory is personal and manipulatable, and that she could choose which evidence to conjecture her story. For the English literature scholar Miranda Steege, this was also Swift's agency to control her narrative over an inevitable ending.

Although the song is romantic in nature, some critics commented that the opening lines where the narrator responds to her ex-boyfriend's compliment, "That's a lie", showcase a cynical or skeptic aspect to her character. The final refrain depicts how time has passed and the relationship has ended: "Someday you'll turn your radio on." According to the musicologist Nate Sloan, Swift's technique of structuring how a song progresses and tells a story with a timeline of events, including a reinterpretation of the storyline in the final refrain, is rooted in country-music tradition dated back to the 1980s. Dubbed the "Time-Shift paradigm" by the music theorist Jocelyn Neal, this practice invokes sentiments of nostalgia, loss, and distance from a seemingly familiar experience, which creates an emotional engagement with the listener.

The cultural studies academic Shaun Cullen wrote that the lyrical details of "Tim McGraw", which evoke a Southern United States rural life ("backroads", "blue jeans", "Chevy truck", "Georgia stars"), were instrumental in creating Swift's early image as a country musician, overcoming her "outsider" status because she had lived in the South for only a few years before she became popular.

== Critical reception ==
Music critics generally praised "Tim McGraw" as a solid debut single. There were positive comments regarding the production: Rob Sheffield of Blender wrote that the song "hit [...] hard" because of Swift's "personality and poise", and Jonathan Keefe of Slant Magazine highlighted its "massive pop hooks". Multiple critics praised Swift's vocals; Jeff Tamarkin of AllMusic considered them both girlish and mature, and Keith Groller of The Morning Call deemed Swift's voice youthful but also a "good fit" for the melancholy and reflective sentiments of the subject matter. Roger Holland of PopMatters said that its "suitably twangy and atmospheric" qualities made it comparable to "some of the best country singles of recent years", but he said the title "causes [him] to break out in hives from time to time".

The lyrics also received positive reviews for their nostalgic sentiments. Jon Bream of the Star Tribune hailed the song as "an ingenious way of mixing a clever hook with believable sentiment" and included the song in his list of the "12 singles that made me turn up the radio". Tamarkin thought that associating a musician like McGraw with lost romance was a familiar songwriting device, but Swift managed to make it sound original and considered it a successful hook. The Arizona Republic's Ed Masley contended that the vulnerability portrayed made the song relatable. Rolling Stone selected the track as an example of Swift's early success for "sounding bright-eyed but remarkably seasoned".

Multiple critics have considered "Tim McGraw" a blueprint for Swift's songwriting about lost love, romantic longing, and nostalgia, which came to define much of her artistry. In this regard, the communication scholar Keith Nainby considered "Tim McGraw" her signature song. Some reviews have commented that the title was an ingenious move for Swift to attract early attention from country music fans. Rolling Stone featured "Tim McGraw" in two of its all-time rankings: "100 Greatest Debut Singles of All Time" (2020), on which "Tim McGraw" is ranked at number 11, and "200 Greatest Country Songs of All Time" (2024), on which the song is ranked at number 124.

== Music video ==
The music video for "Tim McGraw" was directed by Trey Fanjoy and filmed in Hendersonville, Tennessee; the cabin featured in the video was a property of Johnny Cash. Swift said that the male lead was cast because of his physical resemblance to the subject of the song. The video premiered on July 22, 2006, on Great American Country. It was nominated for "Number One Streamed Video From a New Artist (Rookie of the Year Award)" at the web-hosted 2006 CMT Online Awards and won "Breakthrough Video of the Year" at the 2007 CMT Music Awards.

The video begins with Swift dressed in a white sundress and lying on the grass by a lake, holding a transistor radio, as evening approaches. She begins singing the song as the ex-boyfriend is seen departing the town driving a 1970 Chevrolet CST-10. He turns on the radio, listens to the song that Swift sings, and turns back to the cabin. There, he opens a letter, wedged to the door, addressed to "Johnny". Between these scenes are flashbacks of their memories, such as them frolicking in a field, lying in a pickup truck and watching the stars, and slow dancing.

== Live performances ==
In 2006, Swift spent six months promoting "Tim McGraw" and Taylor Swift on a radio tour and performed the song during several country music festivals. In July 2006, she gave an acoustic performance of several Taylor Swift tracks, including "Tim McGraw", at Billboard's headquarters in New York City. To further promote the album, Swift opened for other country musicians' tours through 2006–2008. She performed "Tim McGraw" during her opening sets for Rascal Flatts in 2006; for George Strait, Brad Paisley, and Tim McGraw and Faith Hill's joint tour Soul2Soul II Tour in 2007; and for Rascal Flatts again in 2008. A performance at an Apple Store in SoHo, Manhattan, was recorded and released as part of an extended play exclusively via the iTunes Store on January 15, 2008.

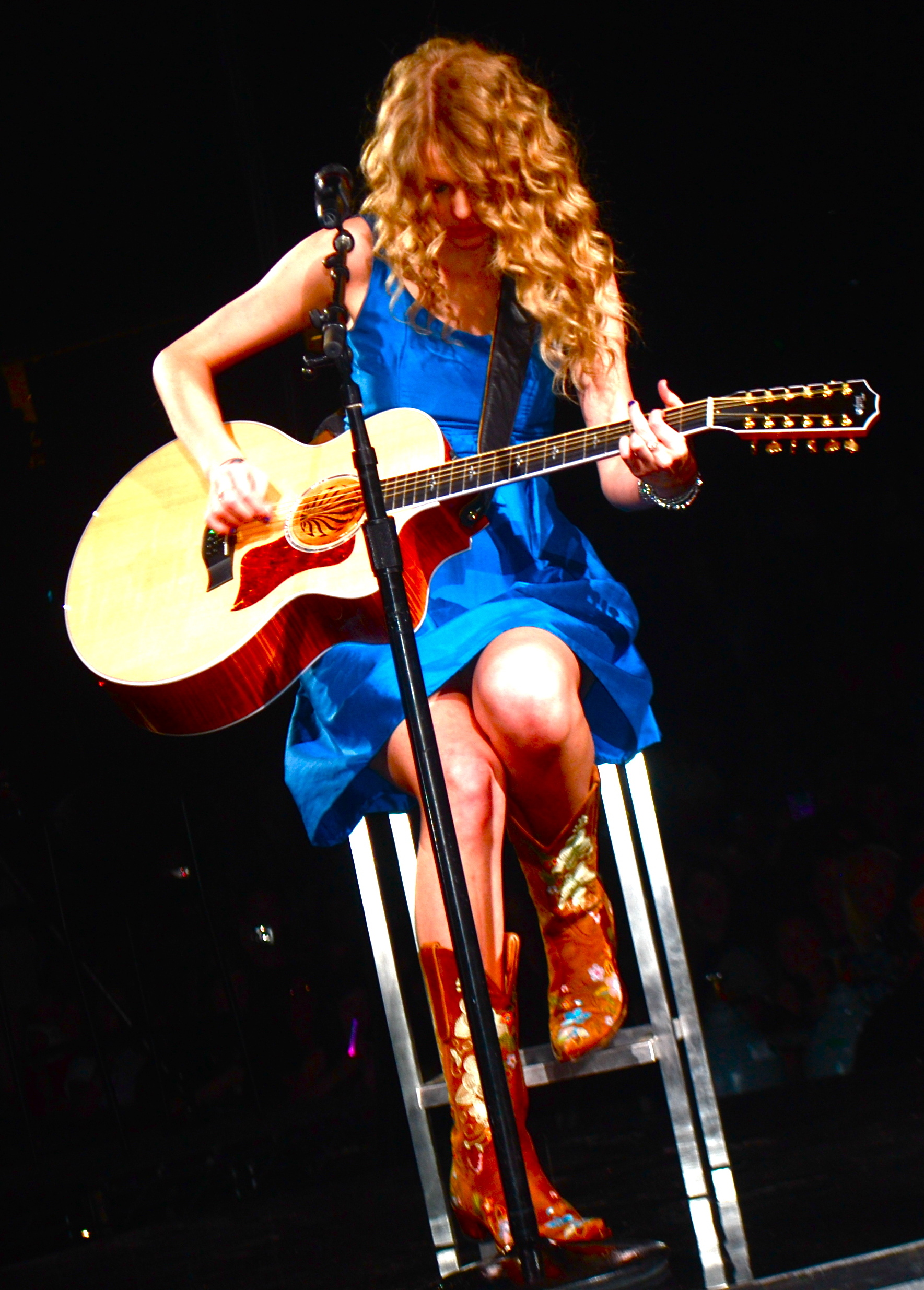
Swift performing "Tim McGraw" on the Fearless Tour in 2010

Swift also performed "Tim McGraw" on broadcast television shows. On October 24, 2006, she performed the track live on Good Morning America and The Megan Mullally Show. Swift had her first awards show performance at the 42nd Academy of Country Music Awards on May 15, 2007, where she sang "Tim McGraw" strumming an acoustic guitar. After finishing her performance, she stood up to greet McGraw, who sat in the front row. Reflecting on the performance, Billboard's Hannah Dailey thought that it showcased how Swift had enough "audacity" to name her debut single after one of country music's biggest stars and sing it in front of him on live television, which proved her relentless talent and ambition to reach new career heights into the 2010s and 2020s decades.

During promotion of her second studio album, Fearless, in 2009, Swift performed "Tim McGraw" during several festivals that she headlined, including Houston Livestock Show and Rodeo, Florida Strawberry Festival, Craven Country Jamboree, and WE Fest. She included the song in the set list of her first headlining concert tour, the Fearless Tour (2009–2010); it was part of an acoustic set that Swift performed on a small, rotating "B-stage" platform located on the floor level of the venues. Swift, dressed in a sundress and cowboy boots, sat on a wooden stool while performing with a wooden acoustic guitar strapped to her shoulder. After she finished the set, she stood up and walked back to the main stage, hugging fans and signing autographs along the way.

After the Fearless Tour, "Tim McGraw" ceased to be a frequent live number in Swift's concerts, although she did perform it on several dates of her later tours. On the Red Tour, she performed the song during the concert in Toronto on June 14, 2013. Swift did not perform the song again in over five years; during the Nashville concert as part of the Reputation Stadium Tour on August 25, 2018, Swift sang "Tim McGraw" solo on piano before introducing Tim McGraw and Faith Hill onstage to sing with her. Zaleski contended that the moment McGraw joined her onstage was "a goose-bump-inducing, full-circle moment that was deeply satisfying". On the Eras Tour, Swift performed "Tim McGraw" three times: she sang it on piano at the March 17, 2023, concert in Glendale, Arizona; as part of a mashup on acoustic guitar with "Cowboy like Me" at the March 9, 2024, concert in Singapore; and as part of a mashup on acoustic guitar with "Timeless" at the October 18, 2024, concert in Miami.

== Personnel ==
Credits are adapted from the liner notes of Taylor Swift.

- Taylor Swift – writer, vocals
- Liz Rose – writer
- Nathan Chapman – producer, additional recording, acoustic guitar, electric guitar
- Bruce Bouton – Dobro
- Nick Buda – drums
- Eric Darken – percussion
- Rob Hajacos – fiddle
- Tim Marks – bass guitar
- Lex Price – mandolin
- Chad Carlson – recording
- Aaron Chmielewski – assistant engineer
- Greg Lawrence – assistant mixer
- Chuck Ainlay – mixer

== Charts ==
=== Weekly charts ===
Weekly chart performance
Chart (2006–2007)	Peak position
Canada Country (Billboard)	10
US Billboard Hot 100	40
US Hot Country Songs (Billboard)	6
US Pop 100 (Billboard)	69

=== Year-end chart ===
Year-end chart
Chart (2007)	Position
US Hot Country Songs (Billboard)	59

== Certifications ==
Certifications
Region	Certification	Certified units/sales
Australia (ARIA)	Gold	35,000^{‡}
United States (RIAA)	2× Platinum	2,000,000^{‡}
^{‡} Sales+streaming figures based on certification alone.

== Sources ==
- Ledbetter, Andrew M. (2024). "A Semantic Network and Fantasy Theme Analysis of Symbolic Convergence and Fan Engagement with Taylor Swift's Songs". Communication Quarterly. 73 (1): 25–50. doi:10.1080/01463373.2024.2430011.
- Ford, Jessica; Macrossan, Phoebe (December 24, 2024). "'I Work Hard and I'm Nice to People': Taylor Swift, Miss Americana and the Limits of White Neoliberal Feminism". Continuum. 38 (6): 934–946. doi:10.1080/10304312.2024.2445312.
- Nainby, Keith (2024). "'I Hope You Think of Me': The Art of Taylor Swift". Examining Blank Spaces and the Taylor Swift Phenomenon: An Investigation of Contingent Identities. Lexington Books. pp. 31–80. ISBN 978-1-6669-4272-9.
- Parvis, Sarah (September 15, 2009). Taylor Swift. Andrews McMeel Publishing. ISBN 978-0-7407-8596-2.
- Perone, James E. (2017). "The Early Years". The Words and Music of Taylor Swift. The Praeger Singer-Songwriter Collection. ABC-CLIO. pp. 6–19. ISBN 978-1-4408-5294-7.
- Perone, James E. (2018). "Taylor Swift". Listen to Pop! Exploring a Musical Genre. ABC-CLIO. pp. 151–157. ISBN 978-14-4-086377-6.
- Sloan, Nate (2021). "Taylor Swift and the Work of Songwriting". Contemporary Music Review. 40 (1): 11–26. doi:10.1080/07494467.2021.1945226.
- Spencer, Liv (2010). Taylor Swift: Every Day Is a Fairytale – The Unofficial Story. ECW Press. ISBN 978-1-55022-931-8.
- Tontiplaphol, Betsy Winakur; Klimchynskaya, Anastasia, eds. (2024). The Literary Taylor Swift: Songwriting and Intertextuality. Bloomsbury Publishing. ISBN 979-8765104538.
  - Cullen, Shaun. "What It Means to Shake It Off: Taylor Swift, Race, and Citizenship". In Tontiplaphol & Klimchynskaya (2024), pp. 139–150.
  - Steege, Miranda. "'Time, Curious Time': Memory, Agency, and Elastic Temporality in Taylor Swift". In Tontiplaphol & Klimchynskaya (2024), pp. 151–162.
  - Boyd, Maggie Laurel. "'Say You'll Remember Me... All Too Well': Taylor Swift's Mobilizing and Monopolizing Memory Work". In Tontiplaphol & Klimchynskaya (2024), pp. 163–174.
- Zaleski, Annie (2024). "The Debut Era". Taylor Swift: The Stories Behind the Songs. Thunder Bay Press / Simon & Schuster. pp. 7–26. ISBN 978-1-6672-0845-9.
