= Picture to Burn =

2008 single by Taylor Swift

Single by Taylor Swift

from the album Taylor Swift
- Released: February 4, 2008
- Studio: Castles Studio-A (Nashville)
- Genre: Country rock; pop rock
- Length: 2:53
- Label: Big Machine
- Songwriters: Taylor Swift; Liz Rose
- Producer: Nathan Chapman

Taylor Swift singles chronology
"Our Song" (2007)	"Picture to Burn" (2008)	"Should've Said No" (2008)

Music video
- "Picture to Burn" on YouTube

"Picture to Burn" is a song by the American singer-songwriter Taylor Swift from her debut studio album, Taylor Swift (2006). Big Machine Records released the song to US country radio on February 4, 2008, as the album's fourth single. Written by Swift and Liz Rose, the lyrics were inspired by a narcissistic classmate of Swift and depict a protagonist's vengeance against an ex-lover. Nathan Chapman produced the track, a country rock and pop rock tune with elements of alternative rock and Southern rock, featuring plunking banjo and distorted electric guitars.

The original album version of "Picture to Burn" contained the lyric, "That's fine; I'll tell mine you're gay", which was modified to "That's fine; You won't mind if I say", on the radio edit and subsequent versions. Music critics praised the song's production and lyrics for earnestly depicting teenage anger. In the US, the single peaked at number 28 on the Billboard Hot 100 and number 3 on Hot Country Songs, and it was certified double platinum. "Picture to Burn" also charted in Canada and received certifications in Australia, Canada, and the UK.

The music video for "Picture to Burn" was directed by Trey Fanjoy and features Swift fantasizing about taking revenge on her ex-boyfriend after she discovers him with another woman. The video has Swift and her band performing with pyrotechnics as a backdrop. Swift included "Picture to Burn" in the set list of her first headlining tour, the Fearless Tour (2009–2010).

== Background and release ==
In 2004, Pennsylvania-born Taylor Swift moved to Nashville, Tennessee at fourteen to pursue a career in country music. She signed a professional songwriting contract with Sony/ATV in 2004 and a recording contract with Big Machine Records in 2005. She wrote many songs with Liz Rose, who became an important collaborator and formed a lasting working relationship with Swift in her future career. Swift had productive sessions with Rose because she respected Swift's vision and did not want to put her in the "Nashville cookie-cutter songwriting mold". Near the end of 2005, Swift recorded songs for her self-titled debut album with the producer Nathan Chapman. By the time production wrapped, Swift had completed her first year of high school in Hendersonville, Tennessee.

"Picture to Burn" was one of the album tracks Swift wrote with Rose on guitar. Swift was inspired to write it by a male classmate at Hendersonville High School. In an interview with The Washington Post, Swift said, "It's about a guy who didn't like me back, and I got really mad, you know?" She also found him narcissistic, which frustrated her; in an after-school songwriting session with Rose, Swift exclaimed to herself, "I hate his stupid truck that he doesn't let me drive. He's such a redneck! Oh my God!" The two later developed a line in the chorus based on this sentence. Swift said "Picture to Burn" was a "brutally honest" song and cited it as an example of how she expressed her feelings towards those who wronged her. She said it was the only song driven by anger on her self-titled debut album (2006) and that it was a topic she felt most teenage females could relate to. After Swift performed "Picture to Burn" at concerts throughout 2006–2007, she decided to pick it as a single because the crowd seemed to be the most enthusiastic with most screaming it "at the top of their lungs".

In retrospect, Swift stated that the song was something typical of her to say in her teenage years and that it exemplified how she processed emotion at the time, "I didn't know anything then." She explained, "I had this song called 'Picture to Burn,' that's talking about how 'I hate your truck,' and 'I hate that you ignored me,' 'I hate you.' Now, the way that I would say that and the way that I would feel that kind of pain is a lot different." Despite her evolving on a personal level and as a songwriter, she claimed not to be regretful of "Picture to Burn", rather happy she was able to demonstrate "those emotions that when you're so angry, you hate everything. It's like recording your diary over the years, and that's a gift", she said. "Picture to Burn" was released to US country radio as the fourth single from Taylor Swift on February 4, 2008, by Big Machine Records. It was released to US contemporary hit radio on July 15, 2008, by Big Machine and Republic Records.

== Composition ==
"Picture to Burn" (2008)
An audio sample of Taylor Swift's "Picture to Burn", a country rock song with lyrics about burning photographs of an ex-boyfriend.

"Picture to Burn" is 2 minutes and 55 seconds long. It incorporates instruments associated with country music (banjo played by Jeff Hyde and fiddle by Rob Hajacos) and rock music (electric guitar played by Chapman). The track incorporates country rock and pop rock. The musicologist James E. Perone commented that "Picture to Burn" is an amalgam of mainstream country-rock, country (the use of banjo), and alternative rock (the distorted guitars, "abrupt" dynamic shift, and melodic syncopation at the 16th-note level). The 16th-note level syncopation evoked 1970s Southern rock; according to Perone, Swift's use of this syncopation is most noticeable in her lead vocals in the verses, which contrasts with other country or country-rock songs and instead resembles the 1970s jazz-oriented vocal flexibility of such musicians as Carole King, Joni Mitchell, and Rickie Lee Jones. The break features separate electric guitar and banjo sections, which Perone said to "symbolically [tie] 'Picture to Burn' to the worlds of modern rock and country".

Lyrically, "Picture to Burn" is an evisceration of a no-good adolescent male, and is directed towards an ex-boyfriend. The narrator ridicules the ex-boyfriend's love for pickup trucks and threatens to date all of his friends. About the song's theme, Sean Dooley of About.com commented, "Swift takes no prisoners in her quest to make a former flame feel her wrath for doing her wrong." In the first verse, Swift introduces relationship by stating she acknowledged the fact that her former boyfriend was more in love with himself than with her. The second verse has Swift plotting retaliation: "There's no time for tears / I'm just sitting here planning my revenge / There's nothing stopping me / From goin' out with all of your best friends." For the refrains, she speaks of setting fire to photographs of her ex-boyfriend, concluding them with a musical punch line, "As far as I'm concerned / You're just another picture to burn". About.com found the song's theme to be feminism.

== Critical reception ==
The song received critical acclaim. Chris Neal of Country Weekly believed "Picture to Burn", along with "Should've Said No", were the most immediately striking songs on Taylor Swift. Billboard lauded the song as "a totally infectious slice of fun with a singalong chorus that you won't be able to dismiss from your memory bank". Jack Lowe of About.com said the song was fun, and that females would specially enjoy it. Kate Kiefer of Paste magazine selected the track as one of Swift's six best singles, and stated, "She really shows her age in this one". Roger Holland of PopMatters commented that the song was the epitome of how, according to him, Swift was more given in uptempo tempos, and that it served as indication to the nature of Swift's debut album. Holland added, "'Picture to Burn' is two parts Ashlee Simpson to one part Amy Dalley, with an overly familiar guitar melody that could have been lifted directly from the latter." Top music critic Robert Christgau selected "Picture to Burn" as a highlight on Taylor Swift.

Josh Love of The Village Voice attributed the song to be one of the reasons how the singer rose to stardom. He called it a "bluntly relatable composition [...] that connected [Swift] with teens from across the spectrum." Patrick McDonald of The Seattle Times called it a "clever, sassy, upbeat song" Alison Bonaguro of the Chicago Tribune said the song was a "clean-but-still-rowdy" number for Swift. Kevin Courtney of The Irish Times mentioned "Picture to Burn" among powerful revenge songs and noted the lyric "Go and tell your friends that I'm obsessive and crazy / That's fine / I'll tell mine you're gay" (a lyric later changed in subsequent releases of the song to the less inflammatory "you won't mind if I say"). He supported the sentiment behind the song and wrote, "You go girl".

== Commercial performance ==
In the United States, "Picture to Burn" peaked at number 28 on the Billboard Hot 100 chart dated May 17, 2008, and spent 20 weeks in total on the chart. The single was certified double platinum by the Recording Industry Association of America (RIAA) in 2014, denoting two million copies based on sales and streaming. By November 2017, "Picture to Burn" had sold 1.7 million digital copies in the United States. On the Hot Country Songs chart, it was the fourth consecutive top-ten single from Swift's debut album, peaking at number three. It spent a total of 20 weeks on Hot Country Songs. In Canada, the single peaked at number 48 on the Canadian Hot 100 chart dated May 3, 2008. It was certified gold by Music Canada for sales of 40,000 digital downloads.

== Music video ==
Trey Fanjoy, who had worked with Swift on past music videos, directed "Picture to Burn" Swift said they conceptualized the video to be "edgy and comical", departing from the tone of their previous collaborations. Swift herself was styled edgier than usual, sporting clothing, hair, and jewelry she was not accustomed to. She was intended to wear thigh-length boots, but was not able to find a pair to correspond with her height. Instead, her stylist sewed black fabric to strap onto black high heels to give the illusion of thigh-length boots. The video's plot was conjectured to involve rampaging and seeking revenge on her ex-boyfriend. Swift chose football player Justin Sandy to portray her ex-boyfriend in the video, believing he had a classic and suspiciously perfect demeanor; she described him as "real life Ken". The video guest-stars Swift's backup band and real-life high school friend Abigail Anderson.

The video was filmed over the course of two days in Nashville, Tennessee. On the first day, performance scenes were filmed inside the Sommet Center, and involved pyrotechnics. Swift was at first nervous about the shoot, as it was her first experience with pyrotechnics. "There are some things I'm nervous about. My hair could very well catch on fire," she said. She was later assured of its safety and explained to about the discrepancy in the distance of the fire in reality than on camera: on camera, it appears to be quite close to her, whereas, in actuality, it was placed far behind her. On the second day, the remaining scenes were filmed at a suburban house in Nashville. Props were provided by the video personnel. On the set, Fanjoy suggested using binoculars for the primary scenes, but Swift disagreed, believing it could come across as "cheesy". She ultimately accepted the idea after Fanjoy explained how it would translate on camera.

The video premiered on March 14, 2008, on AOL's The Boot. It commences with Swift and Anderson in a car parked behind a tree. Swift reminiscences, looking at a photograph of her and her ex-boyfriend together, calling him "a jerk". Anderson is then seen ogling outside the window with binoculars, and spots Swift's ex-boyfriend and another woman arriving in a pick-up truck. Discovering this, Swift states angrily he never allowed her to drive the truck. As Swift's ex-boyfriend and the woman start frolicking inside the truck, the music begins and the video transcends to a concrete room where Swift (clothed in a grey, one-shoulder mini-dress and black leather, thigh-length boots) is playing an electric guitar, alongside her backup band. During the refrain fire ignites behind them. Afterwards, the band is depicted entering a house furtively, using flashlights. Swift is sitting on a brown couch, sporting a black tank top, black leather pants and a beehive hairdo, as the band ransacks the house. The ex-boyfriend and the woman are shown approaching the house, and, seeing this, Anderson informs Swift and the band via a walkie-talkie. He enters the house and discovers it was ransacked. The video concludes with Swift and Anderson leaving the spot, with the photograph of Swift and her ex-boyfriend in flames, thrown in the sidewalk.

== Accolades ==
Year	Organization	Award	Result	Ref.
2008	SESAC Nashville Music Awards	Country Performance Activity Awards	Won	
2009	BMI Awards	Award-Winning Songs	Won	
2009	BMI Awards	Publisher of the Year	Won	

== Live performances ==
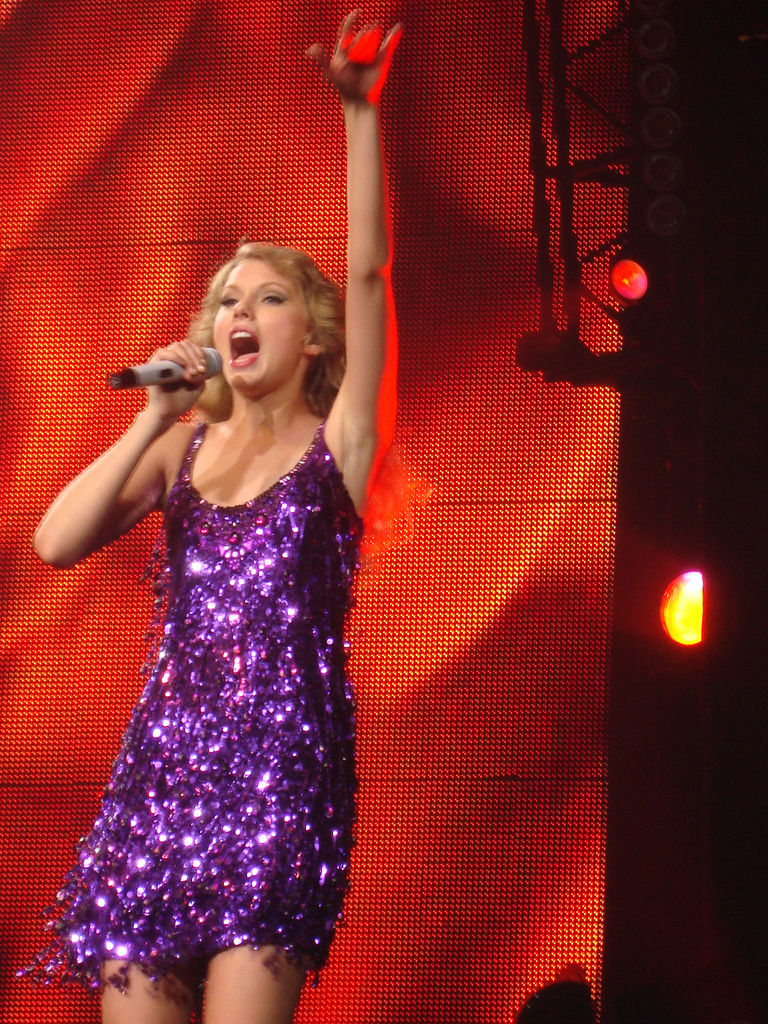
Swift performing "Picture to Burn" on the Fearless Tour in 2010

"Picture to Burn" was part of Swift's set lists as the opening act to Brad Paisley's 2007 tour and Rascal Flatts's 2008 tour. While promoting her debut album, Swift sang "Picture to Burn" on October 10, 2007, on Regis & Kelly. She then performed the song at a concert at the Apple Store in SoHo, New York, which was recorded and released as a live extended play (EP), iTunes Live from SoHo, exclusively sold through the iTunes Store. Commencing promotion for it in early and mid-2008, Swift performed "Picture to Burn" on Studio 330 Sessions, Good Morning America, the 2008 CMT Music Awards, and Nashville Star. Since completing promotion for Taylor Swift and its corresponding singles, the singer has performed the song on Clear Channel Communications's Stripped, at the 2009 CMA Music Festival, at the 2009 V Festival, and at the Australian charity concert Sydney Sound Relief.

Swift performed "Picture to Burn" to close the main set, before commencing the encore on all venues of her first headlining concert tour, the Fearless Tour (2009–10). During 2009 performances, Swift donned a black cocktail dress with sparkly ornaments along the stomach, as she roamed throughout the stage, which was projected with images of searing flames, singing the song. In the 2010 extension, Swift bared a spangly, violet mini-dress. Jim Harrington of the San Jose Mercury News believed "Picture to Burn"'s performance on April 11, 2010 at the HP Pavilion in San Jose, California demonstrated how versatile Swift was as a performer, feeling equally at gusto with tender ballads and uptempo rockers. Of the performance at the tour's final concert on June 5, 2010, at Gillette Stadium in Foxborough, Massachusetts, Jay N. Miller of The Patriot Ledger said, "She strutted down the catwalk chastising another hapless ex-boyfriend". Attending the same concert, Molly Trust of Billboard deemed the performance one of the most energized moments of the night, while Susan McDonald of The Sun Chronicle deemed it simple, yet the most powerful. On July 14, 2023, at the Empower Field Stadium in Denver, Swift performed "Picture to Burn" as a "surprise song", as part of the Eras Tour (2023–2024).

== Credits and personnel ==
Credits are adapted from the liner notes of Taylor Swift (2006).

- Taylor Swift – vocals, songwriting
- Liz Rose – songwriting
- Nathan Chapman – production, additional engineering, acoustic guitar, electric guitar, harmony vocals
- Chad Carlson – engineering, additional engineering
- Steve Short – assistant engineering
- Chuck Ainlay – mixing
- Scott Kidd – assistant mixing
- Jeff Hyde – banjo
- Tim Marks – bass guitar
- Nick Buda – drum set
- Rob Hajacos – fiddle
- John Willis – mandolin
- Eric Darken – percussion
- Scotty Sanders – steel guitar

== Charts ==
=== Weekly charts ===
Chart (2008)	Peak position
Canada Hot 100 (Billboard)	48
Canada Country (Billboard)	1
US Billboard Hot 100	28
US Hot Country Songs (Billboard)	3
US Pop 100 (Billboard)	49

=== Year-end charts ===
Charts (2008)	Position
Canada Country (Billboard)	10
US Hot Country Songs (Billboard)	31

== Certifications ==
Certifications
Region	Certification	Certified units/sales
Australia (ARIA)	Platinum	70,000^{‡}
Canada (Music Canada)	Gold	40,000^{*}
New Zealand (RMNZ)	Gold	15,000^{‡}
United Kingdom (BPI)	Silver	200,000^{‡}
United States (RIAA)	2× Platinum	2,000,000^{‡}
^{*} Sales figures based on certification alone.^{‡} Sales+streaming figures based on certification alone.

== Release history ==
Release dates and formats
Region	Date	Format	Label	Ref.
United States	February 4, 2008	Country radio	Big Machine	
United States	July 15, 2008	Contemporary hit radio	Big Machine; Republic	
United States	December 20, 2019	7-inch vinyl	Big Machine	
