= Liz Rose =

American songwriter

- Born: Elisabeth Wagner; September 6, 1957 (age 69); Dallas, Texas, U.S.
- Genre: Country
- Occupation: Songwriter
- Years active: 1994–present
- Spouse: Brian Maher
- Website: thelizrose.com

Elisabeth Wagner (born September 6, 1957), known professionally as Liz Rose, is an American country music songwriter, best known for her work with Taylor Swift. She has co-written 17 of Swift's officially released songs, including "You Belong with Me", which was nominated for the Grammy Award for Song of the Year; "Teardrops on My Guitar"; "White Horse", which won both Swift and her a Grammy Award for Best Country Song in 2010; and "All Too Well", a re-recording of which — "All Too Well (10 Minute Version)" — reached number one on the Billboard Hot 100 in 2021 and was nominated for the Grammy Award for Song of the Year in 2023. She works regularly alongside songwriters Lori McKenna and Hillary Lindsey, collectively calling themselves The Love Junkies and writing songs for Little Big Town and Carrie Underwood, among others.

== Biography ==
Elisabeth Wagner was born in Dallas, Texas, and raised in Irving, Texas. Rose moved to Nashville, Tennessee, with her then-husband, Johnny Rose, and began writing songs through the suggestion of a friend. One of her first cuts was "Elisabeth", which was recorded by Billy Gilman. In 2003, Gary Allan took Rose's "Songs About Rain" (co-written with Pat McLaughlin) into the country's top 20. Rose spoke in the podcast Broken Record about being married 4 times.

Rose began writing songs with Taylor Swift on Swift's 2006 self-titled debut album, on which Rose has seven co-writer's credits. Among those cuts were the album's first two singles, "Tim McGraw" and "Teardrops on My Guitar", which helped Rose win a Songwriter of the Year award from SESAC in 2007. Rose continued to collaborate with Swift on her second album, 2008's Fearless. Swift and Rose co-wrote the singles, "White Horse" and "You Belong with Me" as well as the title track. "White Horse" won both of them the Grammy Award for Best Country Song in 2010, and "You Belong with Me" was nominated for Grammy Award for Song of the Year. On Swift's fourth album, 2012's Red, Rose co-wrote one song, entitled "All Too Well".

She has also worked with songwriting for Swedish country singer Jill Johnson and Nashville-based band Mockingbird Sun, co-writing their second single "Lucky Guy".

With regular collaborators, Lori McKenna and Hillary Lindsay as part of The Love Junkies, she co-wrote the song "Girl Crush" performed by Little Big Town. For the song, she won the 2015 CMA Song of the Year and was nominated at the 2016 Grammy Awards for Song of the Year and Best Country Song, winning the latter.

She also contributed to Carrie Underwood's album Storyteller with the song "Like I'll Never Love You Again".

Liz Rose first began her career as a songwriter at age 37. A successful songwriter, she does not play an instrument.

Rose is one of the board of directors of National Music Publishers' Association.

Her daughter is country/Americana artist Caitlin Rose.

== Songs written ==
Songwriting discography
Artist	Album	Song	Co-written with	Charts and Awards
Lauren Alaina	Wildflower (2011)	"Like My Mother Does"	Nathan Chapman, Nikki Williams	
Gary Allan	See If I Care (2003)	"Songs About Rain"	Pat McLaughlin	
Eli Young Band	Life at Best (2011)	"Crazy Girl"	Lee Brice	No. 1 on US Hot Country Songs, No. 1 on Year End Hot Country Songs, 2× Platinum
Eli Young Band	10,000 Towns (2014)	"Angel Like You"	Heather Morgan, Mike Eli	
Colbie Caillat	Gypsy Heart (2014)	"Never Getting Over You"	Colbie Caillat, Jason Reeves	
Nelly Furtado	The Ride (2017)	"Tap Dancing"	Nelly Furtado, Natalie Hemby	
Jewel	Perfectly Clear (2008)	"Till It Feels Like Cheating"	Jewel	
Jewel	Sweet and Wild (2010)	"Satisfied"	Jewel	
Jill Johnson	Flirting with Disaster (2011)	"Flirting with Disaster"	Jill Johnson, Lisa Carver	
Jill Johnson	Flirting with Disaster (2011)	"What's a Little Rain"	Jill Johnson, Pam Rose	
Jill Johnson	Flirting with Disaster (2011)	"In One Piece"	Jill Johnson, Lisa Carver	
Jill Johnson	Flirting with Disaster (2011)	"While You're Sleeping"	Jill Johnson, Lisa Carver	
Jill Johnson	Flirting with Disaster (2011)	"I'm Awake Now"	Jill Johnson, Pam Rose	
Jill Johnson	Flirting with Disaster (2011)	"Don't Want to Let You Go"	Jill Johnson, Lisa Carver	
Jill Johnson	Flirting with Disaster (2011)	"I"m Never Far"	Jill Johnson, Pam Rose	
Jill Johnson	Flirting with Disaster (2011)	"When We Had It So Good"	Jill Johnson, Pam Rose	
Jill Johnson	Flirting with Disaster (2011)	"Roll My Way"	Jill Johnson, Lisa Carver, Pam Rose	
Jill Johnson	Flirting with Disaster (2011)	"The Sound of Leaving"	Jill Johnson, Lisa Carver	
Jill Johnson	Flirting with Disaster (2011)	"Used to Think He Was Everything"	Jill Johnson, Lori McKenna	
Jill Johnson	Flirting with Disaster (2011)	"Dreaming Me Away"	Jill Johnson, Lisa Carver	
Jypsi	Jypsi (2008)	"I Don't Love You Like That"	Stephanie Chapman	
Little Big Town	Tornado (2012)	"Sober"	Hillary Lindsey, Lori McKenna	
Little Big Town	Pain Killer (2014)	"Tumble and Fall"	Karen Fairchild, Kimberly Schlapman, Lori McKenna, Hillary Lindsey	
Little Big Town	Pain Killer (2014)	"Girl Crush"	Lori McKenna, Hillary Lindsey	No. 1 US Hot Country Songs, 2× Platinum
Little Big Town	Pain Killer (2014)	"Save Your Sin"	Lori McKenna, Hillary Lindsey	
Martina McBride	Shine (2009)	"Walk Away"	Nathan Chapman, Jesse Walker	
Martina McBride	Reckless (2016)	"Diamonds" (w/Keith Urban)	Nicolle Galyon, Eric Paslay	
Tim McGraw	Tim McGraw and the Dancehall Doctors (2002)	"All We Ever Find"	Kim Patton-Johnston	
Drake Milligan	Dallas/Fort Worth (2022)	"Hearts Don't Break Even"	Brandon Hood, Drake Milligan	
Kylie Minogue	Golden (2018)	"Golden"	Kylie Minogue, Lindsay Rimes, Steve McEwan	
Jess Moskaluke	The Demos	"Mapdot"	Jess Moskaluke, Zach Abend	
Cassadee Pope	Frame by Frame (2013)	"Edge of a Thunderstorm"	Cassadee Pope, busbee	
RaeLynn	Me	"God Made Girls"	RaeLynn, Nicolle Galyon, Lori McKenna	No. 1 Country Digital Songs
Blake Shelton	If I'm Honest (2016)	"Every Goodbye	busbee, Ryan Hurd	
Jennette McCurdy	Jennette McCurdy (2012)	"Better"	Jennette McCurdy, Tommy Lee James	
Taylor Swift	Taylor Swift (2006)	"Tim McGraw"	Taylor Swift	
Taylor Swift	Taylor Swift (2006)	"Picture to Burn"	Taylor Swift	No. 3 on US Hot Country Songs, 2× Platinum
Taylor Swift	Taylor Swift (2006)	"Teardrops on My Guitar"	Taylor Swift	No. 2 on US Hot Country Songs, 3× Platinum
Taylor Swift	Taylor Swift (2006)	"Cold As You"	Taylor Swift	
Taylor Swift	Taylor Swift (2006)	"Tied Together with a Smile"	Taylor Swift	
Taylor Swift	Taylor Swift (2006)	"Stay Beautiful"	Taylor Swift	
Taylor Swift	Taylor Swift (2006)	"Mary's Song (Oh My My My)"	Taylor Swift, Brian Maher	
Taylor Swift	The Taylor Swift Holiday Collection (2007)	"Christmases When You Were Mine"	Taylor Swift, Nathan Chapman	
Taylor Swift	Fearless (2008)	"Fearless"	Taylor Swift, Hillary Lindsey	Platinum
Taylor Swift	Fearless (2008)	"White Horse"	Taylor Swift	No. 2 on US Hot Country Songs, 2× Platinum, won Grammy Award for Best Country Song with Swift
Taylor Swift	Fearless (2008)	"You Belong with Me"	Taylor Swift	No. 2 on Billboard Hot 100, No. 1 on US Adult Contemporary, No. 1 on US Hot Country Songs, 7× Platinum, nominated Grammy Award for Song of the Year with Swift
Taylor Swift	Fearless (2008)	"Tell Me Why"	Taylor Swift	
Taylor Swift	Fearless (2008)	"Come in with the Rain"	Taylor Swift	
Taylor Swift	Fearless (2008)	"Superstar"	Taylor Swift	
Taylor Swift	Red (2012)	"All Too Well"	Taylor Swift	
Taylor Swift	Fearless (Taylor's Version) (2021)	"Fearless (Taylor's Version)"	Taylor Swift, Hillary Lindsey	
Taylor Swift	Fearless (Taylor's Version) (2021)	"White Horse (Taylor's Version)"	Taylor Swift	
Taylor Swift	Fearless (Taylor's Version) (2021)	"You Belong with Me (Taylor's Version)"	Taylor Swift	
Taylor Swift	Fearless (Taylor's Version) (2021)	"Tell Me Why (Taylor's Version)"	Taylor Swift	
Taylor Swift	Fearless (Taylor's Version) (2021)	"Come in with the Rain (Taylor's Version)"	Taylor Swift	
Taylor Swift	Fearless (Taylor's Version) (2021)	"Superstar (Taylor's Version)"	Taylor Swift	
Taylor Swift	Fearless (Taylor's Version) (2021)	"We Were Happy"	Taylor Swift	
Taylor Swift	Fearless (Taylor's Version) (2021)	"Bye Bye Baby"	Taylor Swift	
Taylor Swift	Red (Taylor's Version) (2021)	"All Too Well (Taylor's Version)"	Taylor Swift	No. 1 on Billboard Hot 100 (Note: Chart performances of both the five-minute and ten-minute versions were combined by most national charts. The songs constitute a single chart entry, which is credited with either one of the song titles—"All Too Well (Taylor's Version)" or "All Too Well (10 Minute Version)".)
Taylor Swift	Red (Taylor's Version) (2021)	"All Too Well (10 Minute Version) (Taylor's Version)"	Taylor Swift	No. 1 on Billboard Hot 100
Sykamore	Pinto (2022)	"Go Easy on Me"	Jordan Ostrom, Bobby Campbell	
Carrie Underwood	Storyteller (2015)	"Like I'll Never Love You Again"	Hillary Lindsey, Lori McKenna	
Carrie Underwood	Cry Pretty (2018)	"Cry Pretty"	Carrie Underwood, Hillary Lindsey, Lori McKenna	
Lee Ann Womack	Greatest Hits (2004)	"The Wrong Girl"	Pat McLaughlin	

== Awards and nominations ==
Year	Association	Category	Nominated work	Result
2010	Academy of Country Music	Song of the Year	You Belong with Me (with Taylor Swift)	Nominated
2010	Grammy Awards	Song of the Year	You Belong with Me (with Taylor Swift)	Nominated
2010	Grammy Awards	Best Country Song	White Horse (with Taylor Swift)	Won
2012	Academy of Country Music	Song of the Year	Crazy Girl (with Lee Brice)	Won
2015	Country Music Association	Song of the Year	Girl Crush (with Lori McKenna and Hillary Lindsey)	Won
2016	Grammy Awards	Song of the Year	Girl Crush (with Lori McKenna and Hillary Lindsey)	Nominated
2016	Grammy Awards	Best Country Song	Girl Crush (with Lori McKenna and Hillary Lindsey)	Won
2016	Academy of Country Music	Song of the Year	Girl Crush (with Lori McKenna and Hillary Lindsey)	Nominated
2020	Grammy Awards	Best Country Song	It All Comes Out in the Wash (with Miranda Lambert, Lori McKenna and Hillary Lindsay)	Nominated
2023	Grammy Awards	Song of the Year	All Too Well (10 Minute Version) (The Short Film) (with Taylor Swift)	Nominated
