= Teardrops on My Guitar =

2007 single by Taylor Swift

Single by Taylor Swift

from the album Taylor Swift
- Released: February 20, 2007
- Studio: Sound Cottage (Nashville)
- Genre: Country pop; pop; soft rock
- Length: 3:35
- Label: Big Machine
- Songwriters: Taylor Swift; Liz Rose
- Producer: Nathan Chapman

Taylor Swift singles chronology
"Tim McGraw" (2006)	"Teardrops on My Guitar" (2007)	"Our Song" (2007)

Music video
- "Teardrops on My Guitar" on YouTube

"Teardrops on My Guitar" is a song by the American singer-songwriter Taylor Swift from her debut studio album, Taylor Swift (2006). Big Machine Records released the song to country radio on February 20, 2007, and to pop radio on November 9, as the album's second single in the United States. In 2009, the track was released as a single in Europe and included on the "international" edition of Swift's second studio album, Fearless. Swift wrote "Teardrops on My Guitar" with Liz Rose. Inspired by Swift's feelings for a high-school classmate, the lyrics depict an unrequited love.

Nathan Chapman produced the track, which is a gentle acoustic guitar-driven ballad that incorporates mandolin, fiddle, electric guitar, and hushed steel guitar; the version released to pop radio features a drum loop. Despite its release to country radio, several critics disputed this genre categorization and considered it pop or soft rock. Reviews generally complimented Swift's vocals and songwriting for earnestly portraying teenage heartbreak. Retrospectively, critics have considered "Teardrops on My Guitar" a defining single for her early career.

In the United States, the single peaked at number 13 on the Billboard Hot 100 chart, reached the top 10 on the Pop Songs chart to become Swift's first pop crossover hit, and was certified triple platinum by the Recording Industry Association of America (RIAA). Elsewhere, it charted at numbers 45 in Canada and 51 in the United Kingdom. Trey Fanjoy directed the music video, which stars Swift as a heartbroken girl after learning that the boy in whom she is interested is dating another girl. Swift performed "Teardrops on My Guitar" on the Fearless Tour (2009–2010) and during various concerts of her later tours.

== Background ==
Taylor Swift spent four months near the end of 2005 to record her debut studio album, Taylor Swift, with the producer Nathan Chapman. Recording for the album was completed after Swift had finished her freshman year of high school. Big Machine Records released Taylor Swift in North America on October 24, 2006. Swift wrote or co-wrote every song, including "Teardrops on My Guitar", which was a writing collaboration with Liz Rose.

Swift was inspired to write "Teardrops on My Guitar" by a high-school classmate, whose first name, Drew, is mentioned in the lyrics. According to Swift, the two sat next to each other in class and became friends; although she wanted to date him, he frequently spoke to her about another girl he had feelings for, which led to Swift developing an unrequited love for him. She channeled this feeling into songwriting and developed the idea for "Teardrops on My Guitar" while on her way home from school one day. The subject of the song was unaware of his influence until after it was released: Swift was on her way to attend a hockey game and he appeared at her driveway; according to Swift, because they had not talked for over two and a half years, it was an awkward encounter but ended civilly.

== Release ==
"Teardrops on My Guitar" was the second single from Taylor Swift. In the United States, Big Machine Records released the song to country radio on February 20, 2007, and, in a partnership with Republic Records, released it to contemporary hit radio on November 9, 2007. An acoustic version of "Teardrops on My Guitar" was included on Swift's extended play (EP) Beautiful Eyes, which was released on July 15, 2008, exclusively via Walmart. Two remixes, by Joe Bermudez and Cahill, were also released.

In March 2009, an "international mix" of "Teardrops on My Guitar" was included on the "international" edition of Swift's second studio album, Fearless. The song was released to Italian radio on May 8, 2009, by Universal Music Group, and as a UK single on May 18, 2009, by Mercury Records. Following the June 2019 dispute over the talent manager Scooter Braun's acquisition of Big Machine and the masters to Swift's back catalog, Big Machine re-released "Teardrops on My Guitar" on limited-edition vinyl in August 2019.

== Composition ==
"Teardrops on My Guitar"
A sample of the refrain featuring mandolin and guitar. Despite its release to country radio, critics had conflicting opinions about its genre and described it as pop and soft rock.

The original album version of "Teardrops on My Guitar" is 3 minutes and 35 seconds, while the radio edit is 3 minutes and 24 seconds. It is a ballad with an arrangement led by mandolin, composed of steel guitar, hushed pedal steel, subdued banjo, brushed drums, and a mix of acoustic and electric guitars. The choruses are instrumented by pedal steel guitar, understated violin, subtly distorted electric guitars, and drums on beats 2 and 4 of each bar. The electric guitars feature a grainy sound, and the end of the second chorus is accentuated by a guitar solo by Chapman. Swift sings with soft vocals, which feature a light twang. Critics described the song's arrangement as simple and its sound as mournful, solemn, and tender. According to the critic Annie Zaleski, the composition and Swift's voice have a restrained quality, but she sings with underscored emotions as if she were "fighting to hold back those tears". The version released to pop radio, at three minutes, omits the banjo, mandolin, and steel guitar. It adds a mid-tempo drum loop and echo effects to Swift's singing.

Although the song was released to country radio, critics had different opinions on its genre classification. Grady Smith from Rolling Stone thought that its mournful sound followed the tradition of country ballads, and Billboard's Andrew Unterberger deemed it a country single. Meanwhile, NPR and Roger Holland of PopMatters categorized it as a pop song; the latter argued that it does not contain country elements at all. Ed Masley from The Arizona Republic described the genre as soft rock. As described by the music writers Damian Somville and Marine Benoit, the track is standard country pop: its structure and melodic development exemplify 2000s pop, and its instrumental arrangement is characteristic of 1990s Nashville country. According to the musicologist James E. Perone, "Teardrops on My Guitar" contains prominent pop hooks and is a musically flexible track that could be categorized into pop, country, or rock. In the view of Drew Bratcher, a scholar specialized in arts and culture of the American South, by combining pop, "confessional country", alternative country, "and a hundred other qualifying adjectives that potentially disqualified it from being country altogether", "Teardrops on My Guitar" signified a future sound for the country genre.

The lyrics of "Teardrops on My Guitar" depict an unrequited love that evokes yearning and heartbreak. Swift's narrator is in love with a boy named Drew, who likes another girl. She fakes "a smile so he won't see" how she is hurt inside. Her unspoken feelings intensify and leave her insecure ("I bet she's beautiful") and obsessive ("Can he tell that I can't breathe?"). Dave Heaton of PopMatters interpreted the lines, "And there he goes, so perfectly/ The kind of flawless I wish I could be", as Swift's unachievable ideal of being perfect, which is depicted in many of her other songs. According to Keith Nainby, a scholar in communications and cultural studies, "Teardrops on My Guitar" not only includes autobiographical lyrics but also features imaginative and mythologizing details to depict "youthful romantic ambitions", which are common features in Swift's songwriting on Taylor Swift and Fearless. The radio edit includes the edited lyric, "I laugh 'cause it's just so funny", replacing the original, "I laugh 'cause it's so damn funny."

== Critical reception ==
"Teardrops on My Guitar" received praise from music critics for its portrayal of earnest adolescent feelings. Randy Lewis of the Los Angeles Times thought that the teenage sensibilities contributed to Taylor Swift's charm, and Deborah Evans Price of Billboard wrote that the lyrics had a conversational quality that made the audience easily relate to Swift as a friend. Perone regarded the "teardrops on my guitar" imagery as one of her most memorable lyrical details. NPR selected "Teardrops on My Guitar" as one of the defining songs of the 2000s decade; according to their editor, the way Swift "captures the physicality of yearning without over-selling or over-sexualizing it" recalled classic girl-group songs by the Shirelles, the Crystals, and the Cookies, and resonated with many young women. Jon Bream of the Star Tribune considered the song's message empowering for women.

Reviews also praised the production. Price described Swift's singing voice as pure and earnest, complimented the production as sweet and tender, and wrote that the song was "destined to be a hit". Perone considered the arrangement simple yet effective, showcasing Swift's early abilities to draw from diverse musical styles of country, pop, and rock. He nonetheless described the pop radio version as "anonymous". Rolling Stone selected the track as an example of Swift's early success for "sounding bright-eyed but remarkably seasoned". Reviewing the pop radio version, Chuck Taylor from Billboard considered it a "beautiful mainstream intro" for Swift's burgeoning success, while Maura Johnston of Pitchfork wrote that it exemplified Swift's "deft melodic touch and conversational way with deeply felt emotions" that resonated with many listeners. Fiona Chua of MTV Asia selected "Teardrops on My Guitar" as a standout on the Asian edition of Fearless.

Retrospective reviews of "Teardrops on My Guitar" have remained generally positive. The song was included in Business Insider's 2019 list of the 14 best songs written by teenagers and Teen Vogue's 2016 list of the "91 Best Songs About Unrequited Love". Rob Sheffield of Rolling Stone considered it one of Swift's "defining early smashes", and Unterberger lauded it as an effective single with a "weeping melody", relatable lyrics, and clever title. Vulture's Nate Jones regarded the track as the best example of Swift and Rose's "early songwriting cheat code", highlighting how "they switch the words of the chorus around at the end of the song". Variety's Chris Willman dubbed it the starting point of Swift's pop success beyond country. Alexis Petridis of The Guardian provided a lukewarm commentary, saying that the single was well-crafted but unexceptional. Bratcher commented that he was "iffy" with the song's "country" labeling, but he deemed it a nice listen with relatable lyrics.

== Commercial performance ==
"Teardrops on My Guitar" was Swift's breakthrough chart success. In the United States, it peaked at number 13 on the Billboard Hot 100 chart and number two on the Hot Country Songs chart. It became Swift's first pop crossover success, peaking at number seven and spending 21 weeks on the Pop Songs chart. The single peaked within the top 10 of four airplay charts—Hot Country Songs, Pop Songs, Adult Pop Songs, and Adult Contemporary. At the 2008 Country Awards hosted by Broadcast Music, Inc., which honored the most successful country songs on US airplay that year, "Teardrops of My Guitar" won Song of the Year. The song also won Recurrent Country Performance Activity at the 2008 SESAC Nashville Awards. It was certified triple platinum by the Recording Industry Association of America (RIAA) in April 2014, for surpassing three million units based on sales and streaming. By July 2019, "Teardrops on My Guitar" had sold three million digital copies in the United States.

Elsewhere, "Teardrops on My Guitar" peaked at number 45 on the Canadian Hot 100 and number 51 on the UK singles chart. In Canada, the single additionally entered the airplay charts, reaching number 6 on Canada Country, number 16 on Canada CHR/Top 40 and on Canada Hot AC, and number 21 on Canada AC. The track has been certified platinum in Australia and Canada, gold in New Zealand, and silver in the United Kingdom.

== Music video ==
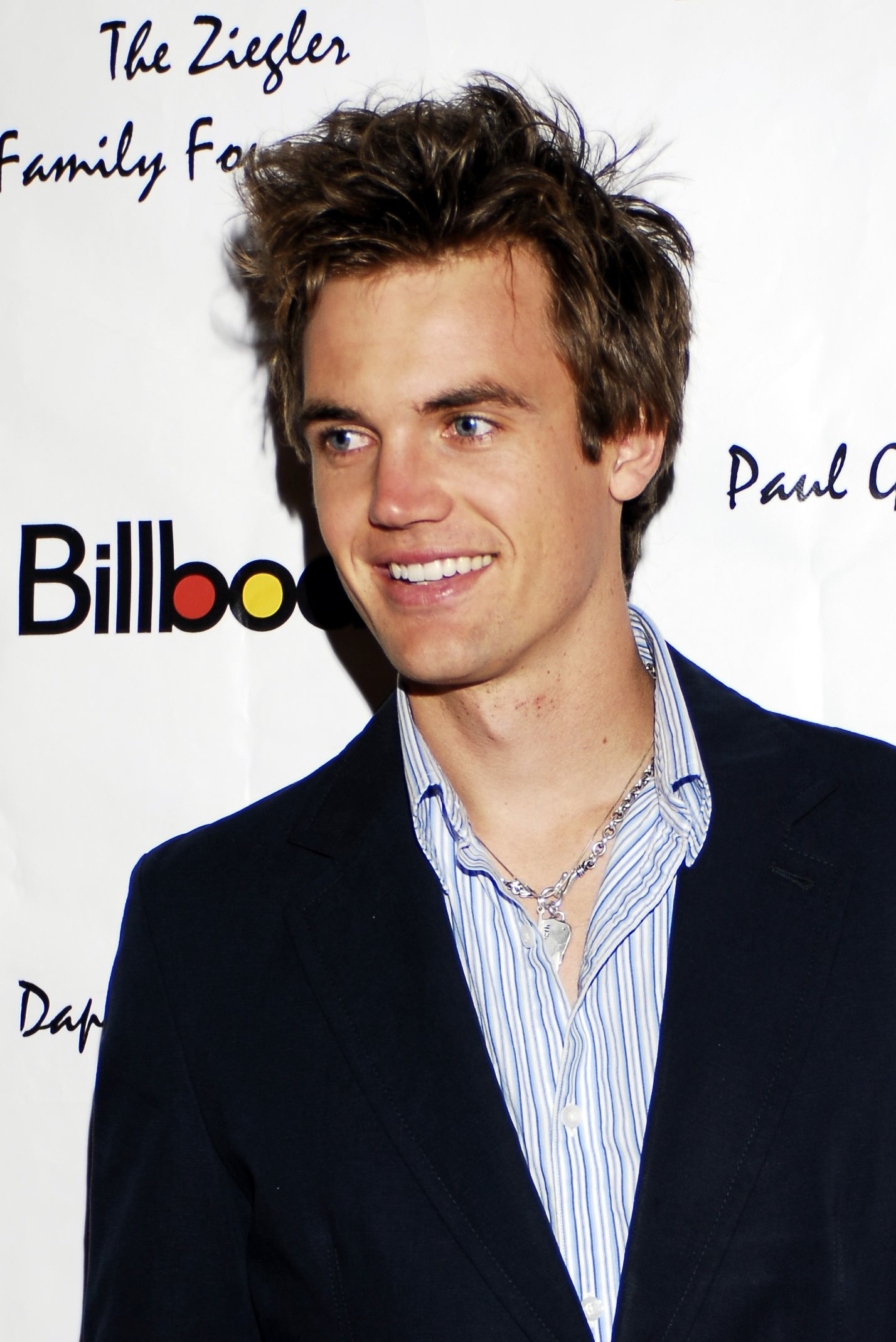
Tyler Hilton (pictured in 2007) portrayed the male lead in the video for "Teardrops on My Guitar".

The music video for "Teardrops of My Guitar" was shot on January 15, 2007 and was directed by Trey Fanjoy, who developed the idea for the narrative with Swift. In an interview with VH1, Swift said that although her label's personnel expected the video to be a mature one, she insisted on shooting it at Hume-Fogg High School in Nashville, which she thought was true to the song's narrative and "back to basics". The singer and actor Tyler Hilton portrayed the male lead. Swift had been fond of Hilton's music and acting on the television series One Tree Hill and the film Walk the Line, and she chose him to portray the male lead because she thought he physically resembled the song's subject. She invited her high-school friends, her cousin, and her brother Austin to portray fellow high-school students in the halls.

The video depicts Swift and Hilton as high-school students. Swift's character is in love with Hilton's, but he is in love with another girl. Scenes of the two characters studying together at school are intertwined with scenes of Swift's character alone in her bedroom, wearing elaborate makeup with rhinestones near her eyes and a long aquamarine evening gown, lying beside an acoustic guitar on her bed. By the song's bridge, Swift's character witnesses the male lead kissing his girlfriend as she watches despondently. The video ends with Swift in the bedroom, crying on the mattress. The aquamarine gown was designed by the wife of Scott Borchetta, who is Big Machine's president.

The video premiered on CMT, CMT Pure, and Great American Country on February 20, 2007. Besides being aired on country music channels, the video also received airplay on MTV's Total Request Live, being Swift's first video to do so. The video received a nomination for "Number One Streamed Music Video" at the web-hosted 2007 CMT Online Awards. Its nomination for Best New Artist at the 2008 MTV Video Music Awards made Swift "stunned" because she thought it was not possible to be nominated as a country artist; Jon Caramanica of The New York Times wrote that such a nomination had been "almost unheard of for a country artist". Spin and Glenn Rowley of Grammy.com thought that "Teardrops on My Guitar" was Swift's first music video with depth to its visual narrative and featured some of her trademarks: being rejected by a boy, yearning, and elaborate gowns.

== Live performances ==
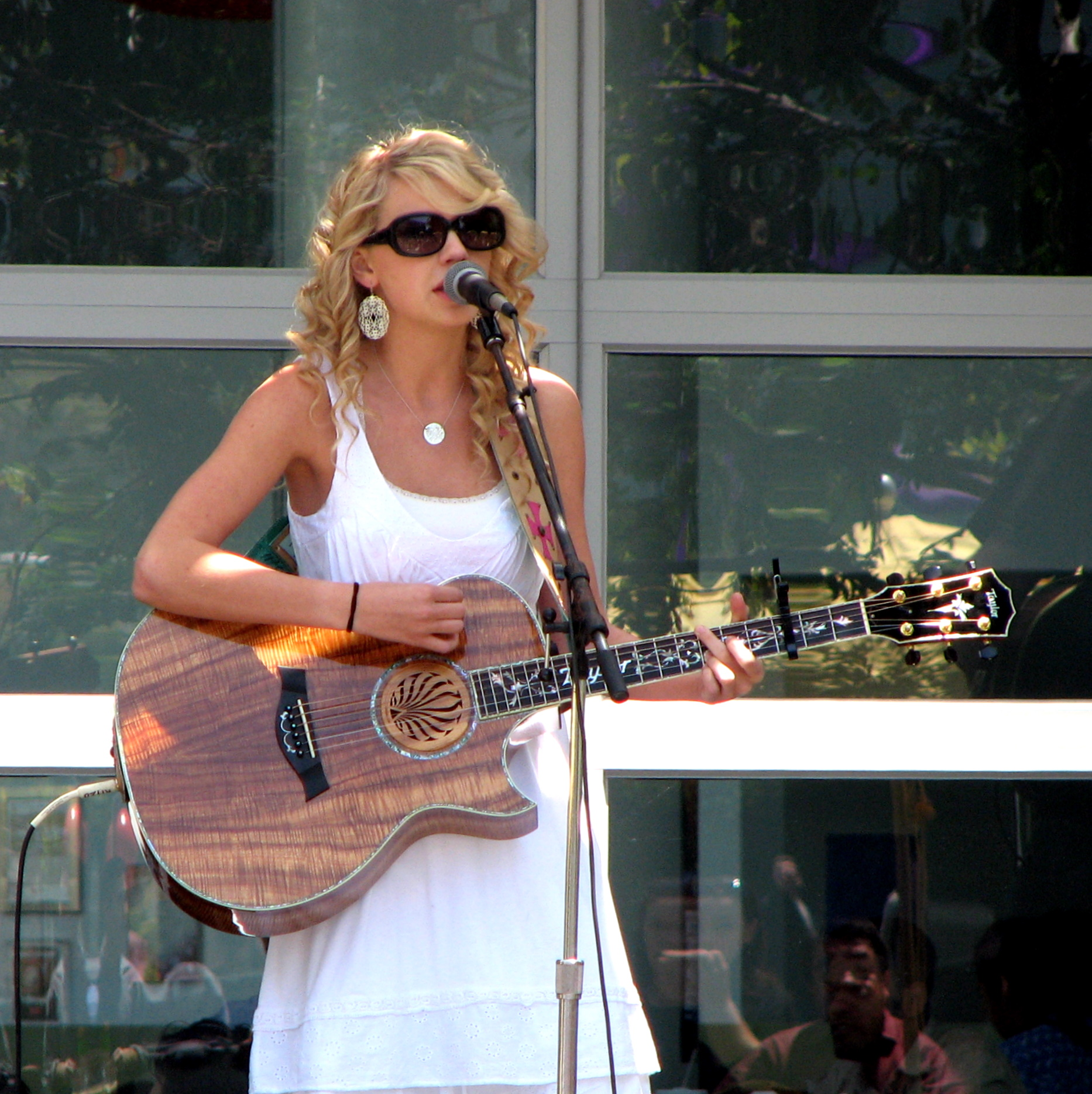
Swift performing in 2007

In 2007–2008, Swift promoted her debut album by opening for other country artists' tours; she performed "Teardrops on My Guitar" during her opening sets for George Strait, Brad Paisley, and Rascal Flatts. She embarked on a US promotional tour in 2008 and included "Teardrops on My Guitar" in its set list. Swift also performed the track on America's Got Talent in 2007, and at Stagecoach Festival and the Chicago Marathon in 2008. A live performance recorded at an Apple Store in SoHo, Manhattan, was released as part of an iTunes Store-exclusive extended play on January 15, 2008.

Before Fearless was released, on October 9, 2008, Swift and the English rock band Def Leppard taped an episode for CMT Crossroads, where they performed each other's tracks, including "Teardrops on My Guitar". In May 2009, while promoting Fearless in the United Kingdom, Swift appeared on The Paul O'Grady Show and performed "Teardrops on My Guitar". The song was part of the set lists of her performances at many festivals that she headlined in 2009, including the Florida Strawberry Festival, the Houston Livestock Show and Rodeo, Craven Country Jamboree, and Z100 Jingle Ball.

Swift included "Teardrops on My Guitar" in the set list of her first headlining concert tour, the Fearless Tour (2009–2010). During the performance, she dressed in a sparkly cocktail dress and black leather boots. It began with Swift sitting at a desk at the upper level of the stage; she sat next to a backup dancer who portrayed Swift's love interest, and the screen projected a school library. The love interest then stood up and came down the stairs to the main stage to slow dance with a female backup dancer, as Swift sang and watched them from above. Swift then appeared at the main stage to conclude the performance.

Swift performed "Teardrops on My Guitar" occasionally on her later tours. During the Red Tour, she sang a stripped-down version of track at the San Antonio concert on May 22, 2013, and at the Singapore concert on June 9, 2014. During the Denver stop of her Reputation Stadium Tour on May 25, 2018, she performed it as a "surprise song". On the Eras Tour, Swift performed "Teardrops on My Guitar" three times. She sang it on piano during the Nashville concert on May 5, 2023, and at the Melbourne concert on February 18, 2024. During the July 23, 2024, concert in Hamburg, she performed an acoustic guitar mashup of "Teardrops on My Guitar" and her song "The Last Time" (2012).

== Credits and personnel ==
Credits are adapted from the liner notes of Taylor Swift.

- Taylor Swift – vocals, songwriter, guitar, harmony vocals
- Liz Rose – songwriter
- Nathan Chapman – producer, recording engineer, banjo, bass, acoustic guitar, electric guitar, percussion, Hammond B-3, harmony vocals
- Eric Darken – percussion
- Dan Dugmore – steel guitar
- Rob Hajacos – fiddle
- John Willis – acoustic guitar (high string)
- Jeff Balding – mixing
- Hank Williams – mastering

== Charts ==
=== Weekly charts ===
2007–2008 weekly chart performance
Chart (2007–2008)	Peak position
Canada Hot 100 (Billboard)	45
Canada AC (Billboard)	21
Canada CHR/Top 40 (Billboard)	16
Canada Country (Billboard)	6
Canada Hot AC (Billboard)	16
US Billboard Hot 100	13
US Adult Contemporary (Billboard)	5
US Adult Pop Airplay (Billboard)	6
US Hot Country Songs (Billboard)	2
US Pop Airplay (Billboard)	7
US Pop 100 (Billboard)	11
US Pop 100 Airplay (Billboard)	10

2009 weekly chart performance
Chart (2009)	Peak position
UK Singles (Official Charts)	51

=== Year-end charts ===
2007 year-end charts
Chart (2007)	Position
US Billboard Hot 100	89
US Hot Country Songs (Billboard)	28

2008 year-end charts
Chart (2008)	Position
US Billboard Hot 100	48
US Adult Contemporary (Billboard)	6
US Adult Pop Songs (Billboard)	30
US Pop Songs (Billboard)	35

== Certifications and sales ==
Certifications, with pure sales where available
Region	Certification	Certified units/sales
Australia (ARIA)	Platinum	70,000^{‡}
Canada (Music Canada)	Platinum	80,000^{*}
New Zealand (RMNZ)	Gold	15,000^{‡}
United Kingdom (BPI)	Silver	200,000^{‡}
United States (RIAA)	3× Platinum	3,000,000
^{*} Sales figures based on certification alone.^{‡} Sales+streaming figures based on certification alone.

== Release history ==
Release dates and formats
Region	Date	Format	Label	Ref.
United States	February 20, 2007	Country radio	Big Machine	
United States	November 9, 2007	Contemporary hit radio	Big Machine; Republic	
Italy	May 8, 2009	Radio airplay	Universal	
United Kingdom	May 18, 2009	Single release	Mercury	
United States	August 30, 2019	7-inch vinyl	Big Machine	
