= Taylor Swift (album) =

- Standard edition cover

Studio album by Taylor Swift
- Released: October 24, 2006
- Recorded: 2005–2006
- Studios: Castles; Quad; Sound Cottage; Sound Emporium (Nashville)
- Genre: Country
- Length: 40:28
- Label: Big Machine
- Producers: Nathan Chapman; Robert Ellis Orrall

Taylor Swift chronology
Taylor Swift (2006)	The Taylor Swift Holiday Collection (2007)

Singles from Taylor Swift
- 1. "Tim McGraw" Released: June 19, 2006; 2. "Teardrops on My Guitar" Released: February 20, 2007; 3. "Our Song" Released: September 10, 2007; 4. "Picture to Burn" Released: February 4, 2008; 5. "Should've Said No" Released: May 19, 2008

Taylor Swift is the debut studio album by the American singer-songwriter Taylor Swift. It was released in North America on October 24, 2006, and reissued multiple times between 2007 and 2008 by Big Machine Records. Inspired by Swift's teenage perspective on life, the lyrics explore themes of love, friendship, and insecurity.

Swift relocated from Pennsylvania to Nashville, Tennessee, at the age of 14 to sign a songwriting contract with Sony/ATV Tree Music Publishing. Her recording contract with Big Machine in 2005 enabled her to work on the album with the producer Nathan Chapman during her freshman year of high school. She wrote or co-wrote all tracks of Taylor Swift; co-writers include Robert Ellis Orrall, Brian Maher, Angelo Petraglia, and Liz Rose. Musically, Taylor Swift is a country album with elements of pop and pop rock, featuring acoustic arrangements with guitars, banjos, and fiddles.

Five songs from the album were released as singles; "Our Song" and "Should've Said No" peaked atop the Hot Country Songs chart, and "Teardrops on My Guitar" charted in the top 10 on the Pop Songs chart. Swift embarked on a six-month radio tour in 2006 and opened tours for other country artists throughout 2006–2007. By promoting Taylor Swift via the social networking site Myspace, she reached a teenage audience that had been excluded as a target demographic for country music. Initial reviews praised the production for its crossover appeal and Swift's earnest depictions of adolescent emotions and experiences. Taylor Swift was nominated for Album of the Year at the 2008 Academy of Country Music Awards.

In the United States, Taylor Swift spent 24 weeks at number one on the Top Country Albums chart, became the longest-charting album of the 2000s decade on the Billboard 200, and made Swift the first female country artist to write or co-write every song on a platinum-certified debut album by the Recording Industry Association of America. Taylor Swift was later certified eight-times platinum in the United States. Taylor Swift's country pop sound and autobiographical songwriting set a blueprint for Swift's next albums and became an inspiration for other confessional singer-songwriters. Rolling Stone featured it in their 2022 list "100 Best Debut Albums of All Time".

== Background ==
Taylor Swift had an interest in the performing arts as a child. While acting in a children's musical theatre company, she developed a fondness for singing and would perform country music on the company's karaoke machine during the cast parties. After watching a documentary about Faith Hill, she felt certain that she needed to move to Nashville, Tennessee—the center of country music—to become a country singer. At 11, Swift broadened her performing capabilities by opening for Charlie Daniels and singing the national anthem of the United States, "The Star-Spangled Banner", at local sports games. She traveled from her hometown in Pennsylvania to Nashville with her mother to pitch demo tapes of karaoke covers to record labels, none of which offered her a recording contract, as they believed her teenage songs were unsuitable for country music's target middle-aged demographic.

The rejections made Swift become determined to distinguish herself from other aspiring country singers. At 12, she started writing songs and learned to play the guitar with the help of a computer repairman who had fixed her family's computer. Her performance of "America the Beautiful" at the 2002 US Open caught the attention of Dan Dymtrow, a music manager who helped 13-year-old Swift get an artist development deal with RCA Records in Nashville. To assist Swift's artistic endeavors, her father transferred his stockbroking job to Nashville, and her family relocated to the Nashville suburb of Hendersonville, where she enrolled in Hendersonville High School before being homeschooled after two years.

== Development and conception ==
Dymtrow's management led to Swift's early exposure to show business—she had an advertising tie-in with Abercrombie & Fitch, a music compilation CD with Maybelline, and a 2004 appearance in Vanity Fair. With a songwriting deal with Sony/ATV Publishing House at 14, she became the youngest signee in the publishing company's history. Swift commuted from Hendersonville to Nashville every afternoon after class to practice writing with experienced Music Row songwriters. After one year on the development deal with RCA Records, Swift performed self-written songs to the label's executives, who decided to hold her off an official contract and keep her in development until she was 18. She left the label and recalled: "I genuinely felt that I was running out of time. I'd written all these songs and I wanted to capture these years of my life on an album while they still represented what I was going through."

Swift invited record label executives to her showcase concert at Nashville's Bluebird Café on November 4, 2004; among the invitees was Scott Borchetta, a music executive who had worked for MCA Nashville and DreamWorks Records. Borchetta was planning to establish an independent record label that needed financing. Impressed by Swift's performance, he offered to her and her parents that as soon as the label was set up, she would have a recording contract with him. Two weeks later, Swift called Borchetta to accept the offer. The label was Big Machine Records, which partnered with Universal Music Group for music distribution. According to Swift, she signed with Big Machine because the deal allowed her to write all songs that would feature in her albums. Her contract was finalized by July 2005, when she ended her partnership with Dymtrow, and her father purchased a three-percent stake in the company.

Swift wrote over 40 songs for the album, and 11 made it onto the standard edition. Seven songs were co-written by Liz Rose, who became an important collaborator and formed a lasting working relationship with Swift on later albums. According to Rose, they had productive sessions because she respected Swift's vision and did not want to put her in the "Nashville cookie-cutter songwriting mold". Robert Ellis Orrall and Angelo Petraglia co-wrote "A Place in This World", and Brian Maher co-wrote "Mary's Song (Oh My My My)" with Rose. Three tracks—"The Outside", "Should've Said No", and "Our Song"—were written solely by Swift. The deluxe edition features three additional songs—"I'm Only Me When I'm with You", "Invisible", and "A Perfectly Good Heart" (Note: On the 2008 physical copies, the title is published as "Perfectly Good Heart".)—co-written by Orrall, Petraglia, Brett James, and Troy Verges.

After experimenting with different producers, Swift persuaded Big Machine to recruit Nathan Chapman, who had produced demos for other Nashville artists in a converted one-car garage behind the Sony/ATV offices. Big Machine was skeptical about hiring Chapman because he had never produced a commercially released album, but conceded because Swift felt they had the "right chemistry". Before approaching Chapman, Swift conceptualized how her songs should sound: "I know exactly where I want the hook to be and [...] what instruments I want to use." He has sole production credits on all songs but one, "The Outside", which credits Orrall as the producer and Chapman as an additional producer. Recording took place for four months near the end of 2005 and was completed by the time Swift had finished her freshman year of high school.

== Themes and lyrics ==
Taylor Swift follows the confessional songwriting practice of country music, with lyrics inspired by Swift's observations and reflections that depict her adolescent perceptions of life, focusing on romantic relationships, friendships, and self-identity. She viewed the lyrics as atypical of country music's usual emphasis on rural lifestyles. To capture real-time feelings in songs, she wrote anytime and anywhere, from studio sessions to school breaks. This practice resulted in straightforward lyrics that The Daily Telegraph found to have "an earnest naiveté". Narrated from the perspective of a teenage girl in an American small town, the songs are set within high-school hallways and rural backroads, resulting in a personal and contemplative tone.

Much of Taylor Swift centers on teenage love, inspired both by Swift's own relationships and her observations of others'. In "Tim McGraw", inspired by a senior boyfriend during her freshman year of high school, Swift's narrator hopes that after ending the relationship and leaving for college, the boyfriend would reminisce about her every time he hears their mutual favorite song by the country singer Tim McGraw. "Stay Beautiful", addressed to a character named Cory, expresses Swift's admiration for him from afar, unbeknownst to him. "Mary's Song (Oh My My My)", written from the third-person perspective of a character named Mary, portrays a love that has survived trials and tribulations and ends with a marriage celebrated by a supportive crowd. In "Our Song", which Swift wrote for her high-school talent show, her character sings about creating a song drawn from her and her boyfriend's daily experiences. Unrequited love is the theme of "Teardrops on My Guitar", in which Swift's narrator is disappointed upon learning that Drew, the boy she dreams about, is in love with another girl; and "Invisible", inspired by a childhood crush of Swift who would talk to her about other girls that he liked.

"Picture to Burn"
Instrumented by plucking banjos and distorted electric guitars, "Picture to Burn" was described by Rolling Stone as a song that "perfectly captures the mindset of a teenage breakup".

Breakup songs are also prominent on Taylor Swift. "Picture to Burn" and "Should've Said No" both depict a vengeful attitude towards boys who cheat. In "Picture to Burn", the narrator criticizes her ex-boyfriend as self-centered and lying, and she vows revenge by dating his friends and burning photographic evidence of him. Its original version included the lyric, "That's fine; I'll tell mine you're gay", but the radio edit and subsequent versions modified it to: "That's fine; You won't mind if I say." In "Should've Said No", the narrator confronts a cheating ex-lover about the fact that had he not done so: had he declined the other girl, he might still have had her without having to beg for forgiveness. "Cold as You" laments a fruitless relationship in which the lover does not appreciate the female protagonist. Swift said it was her favorite song lyrically on the album, highlighting its hook ("I've never been anywhere cold as you"): "I love a line in a song where afterward you're just like... burn."

In other songs, Swift sings about insecurity and self-consciousness. "The Outside", which Swift wrote at 12, describes the loneliness she felt when her love of country music alienated her from her friends at school. "A Place in This World", written by Swift at age thirteen when she first moved to Nashville, expresses her uncertainty about where she truly belongs. Swift wrote "Tied Together with a Smile" the day she learned one of her best friends had an eating disorder. The song describes a young girl who lacks self-esteem and disguises her inner turbulence with a smile, but Swift's character tells her that she will never overcome her struggles until she learns to love herself. In "I'm Only Me When I'm with You", Swift's narrator appreciates a loved one for their understanding, which makes her comfortable enough to share her insecurities and secrets.

== Music ==
Taylor Swift incorporates multiple country music elements, including a twang in Swift's vocals and acoustic arrangements composed of guitars, fiddles, banjos, mandolins, and dobro instruments that conjure the roots of American folk music popular in the American South. Big Machine marketed the album to country radio, but music critics debated its genre classification. Some publications' reviews appeared in their country music columns; multiple others commented that the songs incorporate influences of pop, rock, and rap. Jon Caramanica from The New York Times called the overall sound "pop-minded country", while Business Insider's Callie Ahlgrim considered it "banjo-pop" and The Daily Telegraph's James Lachno deemed it "country bubblegum-pop". Grady Smith from Rolling Stone listed "Tim McGraw", "Teardrops on My Guitar", "Our Song", and "Picture to Burn" among Swift's "countriest songs" that evoke "classic country" in their instruments and song structure. According to Maura Johnston, in her review for Pitchfork, the album is a "solid" country record, but many of its songs have a "deft melodic touch and conversational way" that make them seamlessly translatable to mainstream pop music.

"Tim McGraw"
The lead single and opening track, "Tim McGraw", evokes diverse influences of country, rock and roll, and doo-wop through its chord progression and melody.

The opening track "Tim McGraw" is an understated acoustic guitar-driven ballad that incorporates the '50s progression (I–vi–IV–V); its melody is defined by repeated short motifs and variations of one figure within a small pitch range, and its refrain—and to a lesser degree, its verses—extensively uses syncopation at the sixteenth-note level. According to musicologist James E. Perone, these elements evoke diverse styles, such as the nostalgic feel of 1950s–1960s rock and roll and doo-wop, combined with the melodic rhythms of contemporary alternative rock and hip-hop. The genre-agnostic sound of "Tim McGraw" informs the styles of other tracks. "Picture to Burn" similarly uses syncopation at the sixteenth-note level, and Swift's vocals in the song imitate the jazz-influenced flexibility of 1970s female singer-songwriters such as Rickie Lee Jones, Carole King, and Joni Mitchell. Its arrangement features a mix of banjo, mandolin, pedal steel, and fiddle, and separate solos of banjo and electric guitar in the break.

"Teardrops on My Guitar" features a tender production composed of hushed pedal steel, subdued banjo, and a mix of acoustic and electric guitars, with a sound that critics deem adaptable to pop, rock, and country. The version released to pop radio replaced the banjo with a drum loop; Perone commented that this change transformed the track from a genre-agnostic tune to a "rather anonymous pop ballad". "A Place in This World" is built on picked banjos and features influences of 1990s alternative rock, and "Cold as You" has a slow-tempo balladic production instrumented by sorrowful fiddles. "The Outside", similar to "Tim McGraw" and "Picture to Burn", uses 1970s jazz-influenced vocal flexibility and short musical motifs that evoke alternative rock; its country rock melody alternates between syncopated phrases at the eighth-note and sixteenth-note levels. The arrangement of "Tied Together with a Smile" includes prominent acoustic guitars, fiddles, and dobro, evoking folk and country styles.

"Stay Beautiful", similar to "Tim McGraw", follows the '50s progression; it incorporates traditional styles of folk and country. In "Should've Said No", the electric guitar tone evokes the texture of rock power ballads, while the fiddles in the introduction and break, along with the use of minor chords and the pentatonic scale, showcase influences of Anglo-American folk music. "Mary's Song (Oh My My My)" is a mandolin-led country pop track with influences of traditional country folk. The standard album's closing track, "Our Song", is built on a banjo riff with a dynamic contrast between the verses and the refrains: the verses use repeated pitches in the lower register of Swift's vocals, with her singing at one pitch for a sustained period; the refrains emphasize the fifth scale-step with a wider-ranging melody and higher-pitched vocals, resulting in an upbeat and tuneful sound. Some critics identify elements of hip-hop and rhythmic music in the phrasing and the compressed drums during the final refrain.

"I'm Only Me When I'm with You" is driven by subdued pedal steel, lively drums, and interweaving fiddles. The version included on Taylor Swift is the same as the one that Swift recorded at 14 while she was still under RCA Records' development deal; the label had rejected it because they deemed it "too pop". "Invisible" features melancholic fiddle instrumentation, while "A Perfectly Good Heart" has a balladic, country-pop production.

== Release and promotion ==
Big Machine released "Tim McGraw" to US country radio on June 19, 2006, as Swift's debut single. Swift spent the summer of 2006 with her mother and Big Machine personnel putting CD copies of the single to pitch to radio stations across the United States. To promote the single and the album, she embarked on a six-month radio tour, continuing through the end of 2006. "Tim McGraw" peaked at number 40 on the Billboard Hot 100. On the Hot Country Songs chart, the single reached the top 10 by December 2006 and peaked at number six in January 2007.

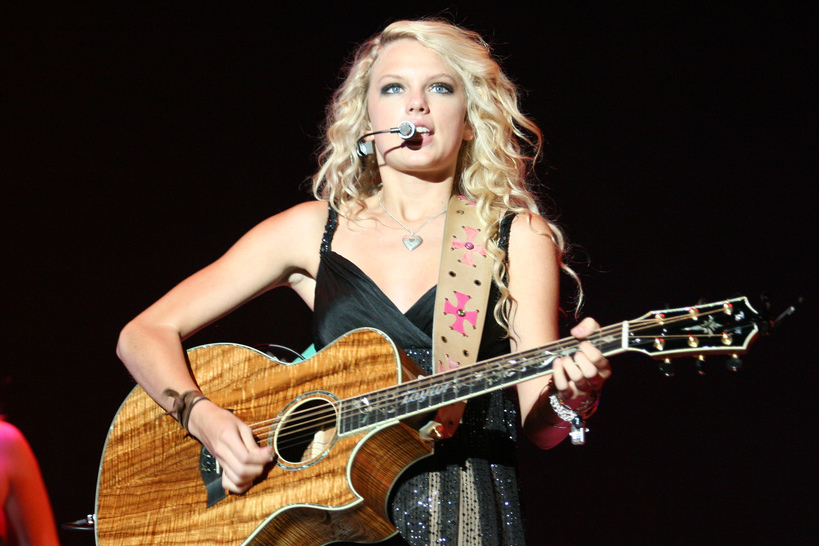
Swift opening for Brad Paisley in 2007. To promote her first album, Swift opened for other country musicians in 2007 and 2008.

Big Machine released Taylor Swift on October 24, 2006. Swift designed doodle graphics for the album packaging. In the liner notes, Swift included hints at the subjects of her songs: in the lyrics to each track, she capitalized certain syllables that would spell out the message; she was inspired by the Beatles' practice of hiding secret messages in their records. On the day of the album's release, Swift performed live on Good Morning America and The Megan Mullally Show. She performed on America's Got Talent and Total Request Live and opened tours for other country musicians, including Rascal Flatts in October–November 2006, George Strait in January–March 2007, Brad Paisley in April–November 2007, and Tim McGraw and Faith Hill in July 2007.

Taylor Swift was reissued several times between 2006 and 2008; each edition contained different bonus tracks and music videos. A deluxe edition was released on November 6, 2007. It contains the three bonus tracks and a recording of Swift's first phone conversation with McGraw. Its DVD accompaniment includes the music videos of "Tim McGraw", "Teardrops on My Guitar", and "Our Song"; behind-the-scenes footage; and a home video. An "enhanced" edition was released in March 2008, containing the "pop version" of "Teardrops on My Guitar". Swift extensively used her social media profile on Myspace to communicate with her audience, sharing her daily blogs and song information. Her online marketing strategy boosted the album's popularity among teenagers and young adults, who had been excluded as target demographics for country music.

Four more singles were released: "Teardrops on My Guitar", "Our Song", "Picture to Burn", and "Should've Said No". All of them reached the top 10 of Hot Country Songs, making Swift the first female country artist to have five US top-10 country hits from her debut album. "Teardrops on My Guitar" had a crossover release to pop radio; it peaked at number 13 on the Billboard Hot 100 and reached the top 10 on four of Billboard's airplay charts: Hot Country Songs, Pop Songs, Adult Pop Songs, and Adult Contemporary, becoming Swift's first crossover success on the pop charts. "Our Song" and "Should've Said No" reached number one on Hot Country Songs. With "Our Song", Swift became the first female solo country artist to single-handedly write and sing a number-one country song.

In August 2019, Big Machine re-released the Taylor Swift singles on limited-edition vinyl. This was met with backlash from Swift's fans in light of the dispute over the ownership of Swift's album masters, which had been sold by Big Machine to the talent manager, Scooter Braun. The ownership of those masters was acquired by Swift on May 30, 2025; she revealed on the same day that she had finished re-recording Taylor Swift.

== Critical reception ==
=== Reviews ===
Professional ratings
Aggregate scores
Source	Rating
Metacritic	67/100
Review scores
Source	Rating
AllMusic	3.5/5 stars
Christgau's Consumer Guide	(choice cut)
Country Weekly	3.5/5 stars
The Palm Beach Post	A
The Philadelphia Inquirer	3/4 stars
Pitchfork	6.7/10
PopMatters	6/10
Rolling Stone	3/5 stars

Taylor Swift received generally positive reviews. According to critical consensus, Swift's songwriting used familiar topics but succeeded in sounding original and novel. The review aggregate site Metacritic reported five published reviews and assigned the album an aggregated score of 67 out of 100.

Laura Snapes of The Guardian said that critics were impressed by Swift's "pure yet prematurely wise" portrayals of adolescent feelings; such reviewers include Ken Rosenbaum of The Toledo Blade, Nick Cristiano of The Philadelphia Inquirer, Jeff Tamarkin of AllMusic, and Rolling Stone. Several critics, such as Rosenbaum, Johnston, and Country Weekly's Chris Neal, praised Swift's ability to convey different emotions that made her songs connect with people of all ages, not just teenagers. Tamarkin opined that the lyrical details were sophisticated.

The reception of the album's sound was not as uniformly positive. In a laudatory review, The Palm Beach Post's Janis Fontaine wrote that Taylor Swift had a musical maturity with catchy melodies that complemented the lyrical sentiments. Rosenbaum and The Morning Call's Keith Groller praised Swift's vocals, and Cristiano complimented the acoustic country sounds for showcasing the "taste and restraint of the singing and writing". Johnston considered Taylor Swift a showcase of Swift's deft musical abilities to create catchy songs from different styles and not just country.

In less complimentary reviews, Tamarkin criticized some unnecessary "gloss" to the songs, and Chrissie Dickinson of the Chicago Tribune deemed Taylor Swift "pleasant enough" but not groundbreaking. Writing for PopMatters, Roger Holland argued that Taylor Swift limited Swift's creative outlook to country music despite her "very obvious pop sensibilities". Robert Christgau designated the album with a "cut", selecting "Tim McGraw" and "Picture to Burn" as highlights. (Note: In Robert Christgau's rating, a "cut" means "a good song on an album that isn't worth your time or money".)

=== Accolades and reappraisal ===
Taylor Swift helped Swift earn a nomination for New Female Vocalist of the Year at the 2007 Academy of Country Music Awards and a nomination for the Grammy Award for Best New Artist at the 50th Annual Grammy Awards (2008), and win a Horizon Award at the 2007 Country Music Association Awards. The album was nominated for Album of the Year at the 2008 Academy of Country Music Awards.

Retrospective reviews have remained generally favorable, praising the album for featuring Swift's early songwriting strengths. According to Perone, the songs evoke high-school sentiments while being "general and vague" about the characters' ages, suggesting that they could have been written by someone more experienced in life than the teenage Swift at the time. In July 2022, Rolling Stone ranked Taylor Swift at number 32 on its list "100 Best Debut Albums of All Time".

== Commercial performance ==
In the United States, Taylor Swift debuted at number 19 on the Billboard 200 chart dated November 11, 2006, with first-week sales of 40,000. The album continued to sell at a fairly consistent pace, defying the typical trend of albums gradually declining in sales; it had sold one million copies by November 2007 and reached its peak at number five on the Billboard 200 chart dated January 19, 2008. By October 2009, Taylor Swift had become the longest-charting album of the 2000s, having spent 157 weeks on the chart. On the Top Country Albums chart, it spent 24 non-consecutive weeks at number one. The album had sold 5.871 million copies by January 2024. The Recording Industry Association of America, in September 2025, certified Taylor Swift eight-times platinum for accumulating eight million album-equivalent units. It made Swift the first female solo country artist to write or co-write every song on a platinum-certified debut album.

Taylor Swift peaked at number 14 in Canada and charted in several European markets, appearing on some charts years after its initial release. It peaked at numbers 81 in the United Kingdom, 59 in Ireland, 49 in Austria, 33 in Portugal, and 2 in Greece. In the Asia–Pacific region, the album peaked at number 33 in Australia, 38 in New Zealand, and 53 in Japan. Taylor Swift was certified quintuple platinum in Canada, double platinum in Australia, platinum in New Zealand and the United Kingdom, and gold in Singapore.

== Impact ==
Ms. Swift ... has quickly established herself as the most remarkable country music breakthrough artist of the decade. [...] She has aggressively used online social networks to stay connected with her young audience in a way that ... is proving to be revolutionary in country music, ... helping country reach a new audience.

— Jon Caramanica, The New York Times (2008)

When Taylor Swift was released, country music was welcoming a surge of young female artists. While Swift was part of this trend, her themes of adolescence and youth were considered novel for country music's middle-aged target demographic. Her album was met with doubts from Nashville music industry executives, but its commercial success on country radio established her as one of the few successful female artists in a radio format traditionally dominated by male musicians. Its success helped the newly formed Big Machine Records sign Garth Brooks and Jewel to their roster of artists.

Although there were disagreements over her identity as a country artist, according to Rolling Stone, following the Dixie Chicks controversy in 2003 that left "a huge space opened up in the heart of the country audience", Swift "has completely filled it" with a country style that was as "rock-informed" as "teen-poppy". Analyzing Swift's early success in country music, the communication studies scholar Clementine Oberst argued that Taylor Swift's lyrical focus on heterosexual monogamy and religious beliefs contributed to her image as a wholesome, all-American teenage girl, aligning with country music's "hegemonic whiteness". Her personal songs and online marketing via Myspace resonated with teenagers—a demographic that had been neglected as a target audience in country music. This broad relatability contributed to her popularity on both country and pop radio.

Many of Taylor Swift's aspects set the blueprint for Swift's later albums—the country-pop sound, the autobiographical, confessional songwriting, and the online marketing strategy on social media sites—which helped her cultivate a loyal fan base known as Swifties. Besides shaping Swift's artistry, the confessional songs about unrequited love and heartbreak inspired a subsequent generation of singer-songwriters such as Conan Gray and Olivia Rodrigo. Taylor Swift also contributed to the popularity of a modernized country-pop sound; Rolling Stone thought that the album showcased "complete mastery of a genre [that Swift] was also completely transforming."

== Track listing ==
Standard edition
No.	Title	Writer(s)	Producer(s)	Length
1.	"Tim McGraw"	Taylor Swift; Liz Rose	Nathan Chapman	3:54
2.	"Picture to Burn"	Swift; Rose	Chapman	2:55
3.	"Teardrops on My Guitar"	Swift; Rose	Chapman	3:35
4.	"A Place in This World"	Swift; Robert Ellis Orrall; Angelo Petraglia	Chapman	3:22
5.	"Cold as You"	Swift; Rose	Chapman	4:01
6.	"The Outside"	Swift	Orrall; Chapman^{[a]}	3:29
7.	"Tied Together with a Smile"	Swift; Rose	Chapman	4:11
8.	"Stay Beautiful"	Swift; Rose	Chapman	3:58
9.	"Should've Said No"	Swift	Chapman	4:04
10.	"Mary's Song (Oh My My My)"	Swift; Rose; Brian Maher	Chapman	3:35
11.	"Our Song"	Swift	Chapman	3:24
Total length:				40:28

Deluxe edition
No.	Title	Writer(s)	Producer(s)	Length
12.	"I'm Only Me When I'm with You"	Swift; Orrall; Petraglia	Orrall; Petraglia	3:35
13.	"Invisible"	Swift; Orrall	Orrall	3:26
14.	"A Perfectly Good Heart"	Swift; Brett James; Troy Verges	James; Verges	3:42
15.	"Taylor Swift's 1st Phone Call with Tim McGraw"			4:44
Total length:				55:55

Revised edition
No.	Title	Writer(s)	Producer	Length
15.	"Teardrops on My Guitar" (pop version)	Swift; Rose	Chapman	2:58
Total length:				54:09

=== Notes ===
- ^{^[a]} signifies an additional producer
- "A Perfectly Good Heart" is titled "Perfectly Good Heart" on some CD releases for the revised edition.
- Limited standard editions available at Best Buy included a download link for the song "I Heart ?" on Swift's official website.
- The deluxe edition contains a bonus DVD disc, featuring more than one hour of video content. A special deluxe edition, released at Target, contains an extended DVD content.
- Later pressings of the album use the radio mixes for "Picture to Burn", "Teardrops on My Guitar" and "Our Song", in lieu of the original versions.

== Personnel ==
- Taylor Swift – lead vocals, background vocals, songwriting, acoustic guitar
- Nathan Chapman – acoustic guitar, banjo, bass, drums, electric guitar, engineer, background vocals, mandolin, production
- Scott Borchetta – executive producer
- Chuck Ainlay – mixing
- Jeff Balding – mixing
- Bruce Bouton – dobro
- Mike Brignardello – bass guitar
- Nick Buda – drums
- Gary Brunette – electric guitar
- Jason Campbell – production coordination
- Chason Carlson – engineer
- Aaron Chmielewski – assistant engineer
- Dennis Holt – drums (track 12)
- Eric Darken – percussion
- Allen Ditto – engineer
- Dan Dugmore – pedal steel
- Shannon Forrest – drums
- Rob Hajacos – fiddle
- Gordon Hammon – assistant engineer
- Tony Harrell – keyboard
- Jeffrey Hyde – banjo
- Scott Kidd – mixing assistant
- Greg Lawrence – mixing assistant
- Andy Leftwich – fiddle, mandolin
- Liana Manis – background vocals
- Tim Marks – bass
- Robert Ellis Orrall – background vocals, producer
- Lex Price – mandolin
- Lee Ann Ramey – graphic design
- Joshua Whitmore – dobro, pedal steel
- Clarke Schleicher – engineer
- Steve Short – assistant engineer
- Sandi Spika Borchetta – stylist
- Whitney Sutton – production coordination
- Ilya Toshinsky – acoustic guitar, banjo
- Wanda Vick – fiddle
- Hank Williams – mastering
- John Willis – banjo, mandolin, hi string acoustic guitar

== Charts ==
=== Weekly charts ===
2006–2009 weekly chart performance
Chart (2006–2009)	Peak position
Canadian Albums (Billboard)	14
Scottish Albums (Official Charts)	64
UK Albums (Official Charts)	81
UK Country Albums (Official Charts)	1
US Billboard 200	5
US Top Country Albums (Billboard)	1

2010–2015 weekly chart performance
Chart (2010–2015)	Peak position
Australian Albums (ARIA)	33
Australian Country Albums (ARIA)	2
Irish Albums (IRMA)	59
Japanese Albums (Oricon)	53
New Zealand Albums (RMNZ)	38

2021–2025 weekly chart performance
Chart (2021–2025)	Peak position
Argentine Albums (CAPIF)	10
Austrian Albums (Ö3 Austria)	49
Belgian Albums (Ultratop Flanders)	192
Croatian International Albums (HDU)	17
Greek Albums (IFPI)	2
Hungarian Physical Albums (MAHASZ)	31
Japanese Hot Albums (Billboard Japan)	92
Portuguese Albums (AFP)	33
Scottish Albums (Official Charts)	17
Swedish Physical Albums (Sverigetopplistan)	20
US Independent Albums (Billboard)	11

=== Year-end charts ===
Year-end charts
Chart	Position
US Billboard 200 (2007)	19
US Billboard 200 (2008)	5
US Billboard 200 (2009)	24
US Billboard 200 (2010)	62
US Billboard 200 (2011)	164
US Top Country Albums (2007)	3
US Top Country Albums (2008)	2
US Top Country Albums (2009)	6
US Top Country Albums (2010)	19
US Top Country Albums (2023)	41
US Top Country Albums (2024)	60
US Independent Albums (2023)	45
Australian Country Albums (2024)	16

=== Decade-end charts ===
2000s decade-end charts
Chart (2000–2009)	Position
US Billboard 200	53
US Top Country Albums (Billboard)	9

=== All-time charts ===
All-time charts
Chart	Position
US Billboard 200 (Note: Compiled by Billboard for albums that charted during 1963–2015)	18
US Billboard 200 (Women) (Note: Compiled by Billboard for albums that charted during 1963–2017)	9
US Top Country Albums (Billboard) (Note: Compiled by Billboard for albums that charted during 1963–2016)	3

== Certifications and sales ==
Certifications, with pure sales where available
Region	Certification	Certified units/sales
Australia (ARIA)	2× Platinum	140,000^{‡}
Canada (Music Canada)	5× Platinum	500,000^{‡}
New Zealand (RMNZ)	Platinum	15,000^{‡}
Singapore (RIAS)	Gold	5,000^{*}
United Kingdom (BPI)	Platinum	300,000^{‡}
United States (RIAA)	8× Platinum	5,781,000 (Note: US sales as of January 2024)
^{*} Sales figures based on certification alone.^{‡} Sales+streaming figures based on certification alone.

== Release history ==
Release formats
Initial release date	Edition(s)	Format(s)	Ref.
October 24, 2006	Standard	CD; digital download	
November 6, 2007	Deluxe	CD and DVD	
March 18, 2008	Revised	CD; digital download; vinyl LP	
