= Justin Sandy =

American football player

No. 40
- Position: Safety

Personal information
- Born: Wayne, Nebraska, U.S.
- Listed height: 6 ft 0 in (1.83 m)
- Listed weight: 215 lb (98 kg)

Career information
- College: University of Northern Iowa

Career history
- Sioux City East High School Black Raiders (2000); University of Northern Iowa (2001-2004); Tennessee Titans (2004–2005); Cleveland Browns (2006–2007)

Awards and highlights
- Iowa 4A Player of the Year (2000); First-team All-Missouri Valley Football Conference (2003); UNI Football Team MVP (2003)

Career statistics
- Total tackles: 5
- Stats at Pro Football Reference

Justin Sandy is a former National Football League (NFL) safety. He was signed by the Tennessee Titans as an undrafted free agent in 2004 then went on to sign with the Cleveland Browns in 2006. As a student-athlete he attended the University of Northern Iowa. He is also known for portraying the ex boyfriend of American singer Taylor Swift in the music video for her 2008 song Picture to Burn.

== Early life ==
Sandy attended Sioux City East High School (Sioux City, Iowa) totaling 58 receptions for 957 yards and 28 touchdowns. After a team-effort playoff run his senior season, Sandy was voted Iowa 4A State Player of the Year.

== College career ==
As an athlete, Sandy played NCAA college football at the University of Northern Iowa

Throughout his NCAA football career, Sandy was positioned on all three phases of the game: offense, defense, and special teams.

He totaled 47 games in his career, and defensively posted 192 tackles and added 7 interceptions.

He was voted All-Conference multiple seasons by the coaches of the Missouri Valley Conference and voted Most Value Player by his teammates concluding his senior season.

After graduating, Sandy went on to attend postgraduate programs at both Harvard University and Kellogg School of Management.

== Professional career ==
Called an underdog, as an undrafted free agent to the Tennessee Titans in 2004, Sandy was just one of two athletes to successfully earn a Titans roster spot. He was competing with 30 other NCAA free agent players from universities all around the country.

* Worth noting, in addition to Sandy, the speaker, philanthropist, and entrepreneur, Jarrett Payton, was the only other undrafted free agent to make the Titans roster that year. Jarrett also happens to be the son of Hall-of-Famer Walter Payton.

=== Tennessee Titans ===
Sandy was originally signed by the Tennessee Titans as an undrafted rookie free agent on April 28, 2004.

After earning the respect of the coaches and teammates during his time on the practice squad, he was activated to the active roster and made his NFL debut at the Jacksonville Jaguars on November 21.

During the 3rd quarter of his first active NFL game, he suffered a stress fracture in his left foot while blocking an opposing player during a special teams play.

He managed to finish the game but collapsed to the ground immediately upon the conclusion and was rushed to the training room for immediate treatment.

After surgery and several months of rehabilitation on his left foot, Sandy suffered his second major career setback when he suffered the same injury on his right foot just months later.

Determined to return to the field the following season, Sandy sought second opinions.

After discussing his options with coaches and multiple doctors, Sandy opted to forgo the traditional rehabilitation for a controversial cancer treatment which was promised to expedite bone healing.

His healing time was cut in half, and he was able to return for the final preseason game of 2005 against the San Francisco 49ers.

In 2005, he played in three games.

He was returned to the field of play and test his skills against noteworthy NFL players like TE Todd Heap, LB Ray Lewis, and S Ed Reed.

His first start came against the Baltimore Ravens on September 21, 2005.

During the game, Sandy re-fractured his right foot while leaping over a fullback in the backfield to tackle a Ravens running back, thus suffering his third major injury in less than a one-year span.

He was unable to return to play for the remainder of that season.

Asked about his multiple injuries and setbacks, Sandy responded by saying "Tough times don't last, tough people do", quoting his admired high school football coach, Walt Fiegel.

=== Cleveland Browns ===
After departing from the Titans, Sandy earned a roster position with the Cleveland Browns.

During the preseason, Sandy became a starting special-teams player and was in the running for a starting safety position with Cleveland before suffering another major injury, a knee injury during a preseason game versus the Dallas Cowboys.

After two seasons with the Browns in 2006 and 2007, Sandy was forced to make a decision: keep on playing and require a total knee replacement a few years down the road or retire.

Sandy departed with the Cleveland Browns on July 21, 2008. He then went on to retire as an NFL player after a five-year career.

== Notable ==
Sandy starred in the music video for Taylor Swift's song "Picture to Burn" from her album "Taylor Swift." Sandy played Swift's ex-boyfriend and Swift described him as 'a real-life ken.'

Sandy also appeared briefly in the 2009 feature film "Surrogates" by Bruce Willis.
