= Jordana Bryant =

American singer-songwriter (born 2005)

- Born: July 30, 2005 (age 21); Bryn Mawr, Pennsylvania, U.S.
- Origin: Bryn Mawr, Pennsylvania, U.S.
- Genre: Country pop
- Occupation: Singer-songwriter
- Instruments: Vocals; guitar
- Years active: 2020-present

Jordana Bryant (born July 30, 2005) is an American country pop singer from Pennsylvania who began her career posting covers on YouTube and Instagram. She has accumulated more than 400 million views across social channels and over 50 million streams across platforms. She released her debut album, Hopeless Romantic, on September 4, 2026.

== Early life ==
Jordana Bryant grew up in Bryn Mawr, Pennsylvania. Her father influenced her musically introducing her to artists including Garth Brooks, Dolly Parton, and Reba McEntire, Taylor Swift, and Ed Sheeran. She began learning guitar at age 10. Bryant attended The Shipley School and graduated a year early before moving to Nashville to pursue music full time.

== Music career ==
During the COVID-19 pandemic, Bryant began posting videos online including a cover of Carrie Underwood's "Before He Cheats". She released her first single "This Love," in 2020 and the EP Last First in 2021.

In April 2022, Bryant entered into an artist development deal with Riser House Entertainment. MusicRow reported that she had generated more than 15 million views across her social platforms at the time the relationship was announced. Her first Riser House single, "Guilty," was released that month. That was followed by a string of singles co-written with Zack Kale and Seth Mosley. By the end of 2022, she had accumulated over 20 million views online and over 10 million views on TikTok. During 2022, Bryant opened for Restless Road, made her debut in Nashville during CMA Fest, and performed in the Florida Georgia Line-inspired musical 'May We All: A New Country Musical'. Also in 2022, Bryant released the Christmas EP First Christmas In Love. Her 2022 single "New Friends" has more than 80 million plays on Instagram and TikTok.

Bryant released her self-titled debut EP in April of 2023. Billboard listed her track "Penniless & Broke" as one of the '8 Must-Hear New Country Songs' and Sirius XM included the track on rotation on The Highway. Later that year, Bryant appeared as direct support on select dates of Alexandra Kay’s 'All I’ve Ever Known Tour.'

Beginning in 2024, Bryant started releasing music independently through Starlight Music Productions. Her sophomore 6-song EP Right Key, Wrong Porch, was released on March 2025. The project was produced by Nathan Chapman, and Seth Mosley.

Bryant released the duet "Out Of The Blue" with former America's Got Talent finalist Joseph O'Brien on May 9th., followed by "Take It As A Blessing," a collaboration with Alexa Cappelli in July. Later that summer, Bryant opened for Lauren Alaina and Niko Moon.

In 2026, Bryant began releasing singles off of her debut album including "Too Little Too Late," "Best Worst Part of Me," and "If I Know You," a collaboration with Tanner Grigoli released through Assemble Sound/Atlantic Records. Her debut album, Hopeless Romantic, was released on September 4, 2026. By release day, the album had already garnered over 10 million streams on Spotify. The 12-track album was executive produced by Seth Mosley and Inverness and released independently.

Bryant joined Julia Cole as a supporting artist on Cole’s Love You to Death Tour in fall 2026.

== Discography ==
=== Singles ===
Year	Title	Label / release credit
2020	"This Love"	Starlight Music Productions
2020	"Not Saying"	Starlight Music Productions
2022	"Guilty"	Riser House Entertainment
2022	"New Friends"	Riser House Entertainment
2022	"Country Music"	Riser House Entertainment
2022	"Had to Be There"	Riser House Entertainment
2022	"Romeo"	Riser House Entertainment
2022	"Bad Relationships"	Riser House Entertainment
2022	"First Christmas in Love"	Riser House Entertainment
2023	"Can I Get It Back"	Riser House Entertainment
2023	"Can I Get It Back (R3HAB Remix)"	Riser House Entertainment
2023	"Penniless & Broke"	Riser House Entertainment
2023	"Best Friend"	Riser House Entertainment
2023	"18"	Riser House Entertainment
2024	"Teenage Dream"	Riser House Entertainment
2024	"How’d You Do It"	Starlight Music Productions
2024	"Fire Works"	Starlight Music Productions
2024	"Saddle Up"	Starlight Music Productions
2024	"Taylor for President"	Starlight Music Productions
2024	"I Could See It"	Starlight Music Productions
2024	"The Crash"	Starlight Music Productions
2024	"Home for Christmas"	Starlight Music Productions
2025	"Remembering It Wrong"	Starlight Music Productions
2025	"Something Like Us"	Starlight Music Productions
2025	"Miles Don’t Matter"	Starlight Music Productions
2025	"Out of the Blue" (with Joseph O’Brien)	Starlight Music Productions
2025	"Take It as a Blessing" (with Alexa Cappelli)	Starlight Music Productions
2025	"Weekend"	Starlight Music Productions
2025	"Ordinary"	Starlight Music Productions
2025	"New Friends Reimagined"	Starlight Music Productions
2026	"Love Like That"	Starlight Music Productions
2026	"Missing You"	Starlight Music Productions
2026	"Truth Is"	Starlight Music Productions
2026	"Rearview"	Starlight Music Productions
2026	"Too Little Too Late"	Starlight Music Productions
2026	"Best Worst Part of Me"	Starlight Music Productions
2026	"If I Know You" (with Tanner Grigoli)	Assemble Sound / Atlantic Records

=== Albums ===
List of albums
Title	Details
Hopeless Romantic	Released: September 4, 2026; Label: Starlight Music Productions

=== EPs ===
List of extended plays
Title	Details
Last First	Released: May 7, 2021; Label: Independent
First Christmas in Love	Released: December 9, 2022; Label: Riser House Entertainment
Jordana Bryant	Released: April 21, 2023; Label: Riser House
The New Friends Collections	Released: June 23, 2023; Label: Riser House
Driving Home For Christmas	Released: November 3, 2023; Label: Riser House
Right Key, Wrong Porch	Released: March 14, 2025; Label: Starlight Music Productions
