= 42nd Academy of Country Music Awards =

US music awards ceremony in 2007

- Date: May 15, 2007
- Location: MGM Grand Garden Arena, Las Vegas, Nevada
- Hosted by: Reba McEntire

Highlights
- Most wins: Carrie Underwood (3)
- Most nominations: George Strait (8)

Television/radio coverage
- Network: CBS

The 42nd Academy of Country Music Awards were held on May 15, 2007, at the MGM Grand Garden Arena, Las Vegas, Nevada. The ceremony was hosted by ACM Award Winner Reba McEntire.

== Winners and nominees ==
Winners are shown in bold.

Entertainer of the Year	Album of the Year
**Kenny Chesney**; Brooks & Dunn; Tim McGraw; Rascal Flatts; George Strait	**Some Hearts — Carrie Underwood**; Hillbilly Deluxe — Brooks & Dunn; It Just Comes Natural — George Strait; Me and My Gang — Rascal Flatts; These Days — Vince Gill
Top Female Vocalist of the Year	Top Male Vocalist of the Year
**Carrie Underwood**; Sara Evans; Faith Hill; Miranda Lambert; Martina McBride	**Brad Paisley**; Kenny Chesney; Toby Keith; George Strait; Keith Urban
Top Vocal Group of the Year	Top Vocal Duo of the Year
**Rascal Flatts**; Diamond Rio; Emerson Drive; Little Big Town; Lonestar	**Brooks & Dunn**; Big & Rich; Montgomery Gentry; Sugarland; The Wreckers
Single Record of the Year	Song of the Year
**“Give It Away” — George Strait**; “Before He Cheats” — Carrie Underwood; “I Loved Her First” — Heartland; “What Hurts the Most” — Rascal Flatts; “Would You Go With Me” — Josh Turner	**“Give It Away” — Bill Anderson, Buddy Cannon, Jamey Johnson**; “Amarillo Sky” — John Rich, Big Kenny, Rodney Clawson, Bart Pursley; “Before He Cheats” — Chris Tompkins, Josh Kear; “If You’re Going Through Hell (Before the Devil Even Knows)” — Sam Tate, Annie Tate, Dave Berg; “Would You Go With Me” — Shawn Camp, John Scott Sherrill
Top New Male Vocalist of the Year	Top New Female Vocalist of the Year
**Rodney Atkins**; Craig Morgan; Chris Young	**Miranda Lambert**; Kellie Pickler; Taylor Swift
Top New Duo or Group of the Year	Video of the Year
**Little Big Town**; Heartland; The Wreckers	**"Before He Cheats" — Carrie Underwood**; "8th of November" — Big & Rich; "Amarillo Sky" — Jason Aldean; "Hillbilly Deluxe" — Brooks & Dunn; "The Seashores of Old Mexico" — George Strait
Vocal Event of the Year
**"Building Bridges" — Brooks & Dunn, Vince Gill and Sheryl Crow**; "I Don't Want To" — Ashley Monroe and Ronnie Dunn; "Me and God" — Josh Turner, Dr. Ralph Stanley, Marty Roe, Dana Williams and Gene Johnson; "Politically Uncorrect" — Gretchen Wilson with Merle Haggard; "That's How They Do It In Dixie" — Hank Williams Jr., Gretchen Wilson, Big & Rich and Van Zant

== Performers ==
Performer(s)	Song(s)
Kenny Chesney	"Beer in Mexico"
Miranda Lambert	"Famous in a Small Town"
Martina McBride	"Anyway"
Josh Turner	"Would You Go With Me"
George Strait	"Wrapped"
Carrie Underwood	"Wasted"
Taylor Swift	"Tim McGraw"
Rascal Flatts	"He Ain't the Leavin' Kind"
Brad Paisley	"Ticks"
Toby Keith	"High Maintenance Woman"
Big & Rich; John Legend	"Lost in This Moment"
Little Big Town	"A Little More You"
Rodney Atkins	"These Are My People"
Jason Aldean	"Johnny Cash"
Reba McEntire; Kelly Clarkson	"Because of You"
Brooks & Dunn	"Hillbilly Deluxe"
Faith Hill	"Lost"
Sugarland	"Everyday America"
Tim McGraw	"If You're Reading This"
Vince Gill	"Sweet Thing"

== Presenters ==
Presenter(s)	Notes
Hannah Storm; Tracy Lawrence	Song of the Year
Martina McBride	Album of the Year
Gary Dourdan; The Wreckers	Top New Male Vocalist
Brad Mates; Michelle Stafford	Top New Vocal Duo or Group
Carrie Underwood	Top New Female Vocalist
Vince Gill	Present Home Depot Humanitarian Award to Brooks & Dunn
Terri Clark; Darius Rucker	Single Record of the Year
Montgomery Gentry; Gabrielle Reece	Top Male Vocalist of the Year
Joe Nichols; Blake Shelton	Top Vocal Group of the Year
Eric Szmanda; Sara Evans	Top Vocal Duo of the Year
Luke Wilson	Top Female Vocalist of the Year
Shania Twain	Entertainer of the Year
