= Nick Buda =

American drummer

- Born: March 26, 1974 (age 52); Cape Town, South Africa
- Genres: Country, rock, pop
- Occupations: Drummer, record producer
- Works: Recordings with: Taylor Swift, Jewel, Nathan Chapman
- Years active: 2000-present
- Website: http://www.nickbuda.com/

Nick Buda (born March 26, 1974) is an American drummer and record producer based in Nashville, Tennessee. Primarily associated with contemporary country music, Buda has been featured on recordings by Taylor Swift, Dolly Parton and Martina McBride, and has also worked with Lionel Richie, Jewel, Michael W. Smith and more.

== Early life ==
Born March 26, 1974 in Cape Town, South Africa, Buda was enrolled in piano lessons as a child but soon gravitated toward his teacher's drum set instead. At the age of 12, he and his family moved to the United States seeking an escape from apartheid and a path to better opportunities.

Buda continued to pursue drumming throughout high school, playing in several local bands and touring briefly with “Everlasting Love” co-writer Mac Gayden. He went on to attend Boston's Berklee College of Music on the recommendation of one of his idols – Sting drummer Vinnie Colaiuta – graduating in 1996 with a bachelor's degree focused on percussion performance.

== Career ==
After returning to Nashville following college, Buda moved to Atlanta, Georgia, in 2000 to join the touring band of jam-fusion pioneer Colonel Bruce Hampton. He performed with Hampton's group for two years, sharing the stage with high-profile acts like The Allman Brothers Band, Phish, Little Feat, Derek Trucks, Bob Weir and more.

Returning to Nashville again in 2002, Buda shifted his work to the country music industry, touring with mainstream artists like Cyndi Thompson, Hank Williams Jr. and Emily West, among others, and performing on the historic Grand Ole Opry and Late Night With David Letterman. However, he soon realized he was not cut out for a life solely on the road and started making inroads into Nashville's recording community.

=== Recording career and Taylor Swift albums ===
After building a small home studio, Buda was introduced to producer/songwriter/guitarist Nathan Chapman, who was in need of a drummer to track some last-minute demo sessions. Striking up a potent working partnership, the pair began recording multiple demos each week as part of a studio team which also included Tim Marks (bass) and Chad Carlson (engineer).

One of those demo sessions was for a teenaged singer/songwriter and aspiring country star named Taylor Swift, who liked the group's work so much she convinced her Big Machine record label to let Chapman produce her debut album – 2006's Taylor Swift – joined by Buda and the others.

Buda went on to play drums on all four of Swift's country albums (Taylor Swift, Fearless, Speak Now and Red), each of which has now sold more than six million copies worldwide. In 2009, Fearless won Grammy awards for Best Country Album and Album of the Year.

Since then, Buda has continued to work as a recording drummer, contributing to albums by Dolly Parton, Lionel Richie, Martina McBride, Jewel and Michael W. Smith.

=== Production studio and continuing work ===
Buda owns and operates The Loft – a professional recording studio located in Nashville – where he continues his work as a session drummer and produces the work of other artists. He also continues to perform live with artists such as Jewel and others.
