= Nathan Chapman (music producer) =

American record producer

- Born: Nathan Paul Chapman
- Origin: Nashville, Tennessee, U.S.
- Genres: Country; pop; rock
- Occupations: Record producer; songwriter; session musician
- Years active: 2006–present

Nathan Paul Chapman is an American record producer, best known for his work with American singer-songwriter Taylor Swift. His first production credit was on her debut album Taylor Swift (2006); he served similar roles for her following releases Fearless (2008), Speak Now (2010), Red (2012) and 1989 (2014).

Chapman is a 2001 graduate of Lee University. At the 52nd Grammy Awards in 2010, Chapman won the Grammy Award for Album of the Year for working as a co-producer on Swift's album Fearless and he won the same award at the 58th Grammy Awards in 2016 for co-producing Swift's album 1989.

Other acts for whom Chapman has produced include Kylie Minogue, Martina McBride, The Band Perry, Jypsi, Point of Grace, Keith Urban, Krystall Keith, Shania Twain, Lady A, Electra Mustaine, Madeline Merlo, Jordana Bryant, Tenille Arts, and Jimmy Wayne. In addition to his production work, Chapman is a session musician who plays guitar, banjo, and mandolin.

== Awards and nominations ==
Year	Association	Category	Result
2008	Academy of Country Music	Album of the Year – Taylor Swift, Taylor Swift	Nominated
2009	Academy of Country Music	Producer of the Year	Nominated
2009	Academy of Country Music	Album of the Year – Taylor Swift, Fearless	Won
2009	Country Music Association	Album of the Year – Taylor Swift, Fearless	Won
2009	American Music Awards	Favorite Country Album – Taylor Swift, Fearless	Won
2010	Grammy Awards	Album of the Year – Taylor Swift, Fearless	Won
2010	Grammy Awards	Record of the Year – Taylor Swift, "You Belong with Me"	Nominated
2010	Grammy Awards	Best Country Album – Taylor Swift, Fearless	Won
2010	Academy of Country Music	Producer of the Year	Nominated
2011	Academy of Country Music	Album of the Year – Taylor Swift, Speak Now	Nominated
2011	Academy of Country Music	Producer of the Year	Nominated
2011	Dove Awards	Best Country Album – Point of Grace, No Changin' Us	Won
2011	Dove Awards	Best Holiday Album – Point of Grace, Home for the Holidays	Won
2014	Grammy Awards	Album of the Year – Taylor Swift, Red	Nominated
2016	Grammy Awards	Album of the Year – Taylor Swift, 1989	Won
