= Fearless (Taylor Swift album) =

- Standard North American cover

Studio album by Taylor Swift
- Released: November 11, 2008
- Recorded: 2007–2008
- Studios: Blackbird; Fool on the Hill; Quad; Sound Cottage; Sound Emporium; Starstruck (Nashville, Tennessee); Sound Kitchen (Franklin, Tennessee)
- Genre: Country pop
- Length: 53:26
- Label: Big Machine
- Producers: Nathan Chapman; Taylor Swift

Taylor Swift chronology
Beautiful Eyes (2008)	Fearless (2008)	Speak Now (2010)

Singles from Fearless
- 1. "Love Story" Released: September 15, 2008; 2. "White Horse" Released: December 8, 2008; 3. "You Belong with Me" Released: April 20, 2009; 4. "Fifteen" Released: August 31, 2009; 5. "Fearless" Released: January 4, 2010

Fearless is the second studio album by the American singer-songwriter Taylor Swift. It was released in North America on November 11, 2008, by Big Machine Records. Inspired by Swift's teenage perspectives, Fearless explores love and life using fairy tale-inspired lyrical imagery.

Swift wrote most of the album while touring in 2007–2008 and produced it with Nathan Chapman. It features co-writing credits from Liz Rose, Hillary Lindsey, Colbie Caillat, and John Rich. A country pop album, Fearless features acoustic arrangements of traditional country instruments like banjos, fiddles, and mandolins, intertwined with electric guitars. Its songs follow the standard verse–chorus–bridge form with dynamic bridges and choruses. The crossover elements of pop, folk, and rock of Fearless led to some critics arguing against its categorization as a country album.

To promote the album, Swift embarked on the Fearless Tour from April 2009 to July 2010, and five songs were released as singles. "Love Story" and "You Belong with Me" were commercially successful on both country and pop radio. In the United States, Fearless spent 11 weeks atop the Billboard 200 and was certified 11-times platinum by the Recording Industry Association of America, becoming the first of Swift's albums to reach the diamond mark. The album was Swift's international breakthrough success: it peaked at number one in Canada and New Zealand; received multi-platinum certifications in Australia, Canada, Ireland, New Zealand, and the United Kingdom; and has sold 12 million copies worldwide.

Music critics lauded the album's radio-friendly tunes and emotional engagement that appealed to not only teenagers but also a broad audience, although some deemed the production formulaic. The most-awarded country album of all time, Fearless won Album of the Year at both the Country Music Association Awards and the Academy of Country Music Awards in 2009, and it won Album of the Year and Best Country Album at the Grammy Awards in 2010. The album featured on Rolling Stone's list "100 Greatest Country Albums of All Time" (2022). Following the 2019 dispute regarding the ownership of Swift's back catalog, she released the re-recorded album Fearless (Taylor's Version) in 2021, and acquired the original album's master recording in 2025.

== Background ==
Taylor Swift signed a publishing contract with Sony/ATV Tree Publishing in 2004 to become a songwriter; at 14 years old, she became the youngest Sony/ATV signee in its history. After signing a recording contract with Nashville-based Big Machine Records in 2005 to become a country music singer, Swift wrote songs with other Music Row songwriters and recorded her first album Taylor Swift with the producer Nathan Chapman for four months near the end of 2005. Released on October 24, 2006, the album Taylor Swift was the longest-charting album on the US Billboard 200 of the 2000s decade, and established Swift as one of country music's rising stars. Its third single, "Our Song", made Swift the youngest person to single-handedly write and sing a number-one song on the Hot Country Songs chart. Her success was rare for a female teenage artist, as country music had been dominated by mostly middle-aged male musicians.

To promote Taylor Swift, Swift toured as the opening act for other country musicians, including Rascal Flatts and George Strait, during 2007–2008. While on tour, she continued writing songs for her follow-up album mostly by herself on the road, "at the concert venue ... a quiet place in some room at the venue, like the locker room". In addition to self-penned material, Swift had songwriting sessions with Liz Rose, with whom she had largely collaborated on her first album. She also wrote with the musician John Rich and the singer-songwriter Colbie Caillat.

== Writing and production ==
Swift first came up with the direction for her second studio album after writing "Fearless", a song about an imaginary "best first date", while touring with Brad Paisley in mid-2007. Swift's songwriting was influenced by Paisley and Sheryl Crow's approach to expressing emotions. (Note: Swift admired Crow for her "candidness, ... how she tells it like it is, but still is vulnerable". Speaking on Paisley, Swift said: "He can write something so touching it can make you cry, and then he can make you laugh so hard that you can't breathe.") Continuing on the romantic themes of her first album, Swift chose to write songs about her personal feelings and observations of the world around her from the perspectives of a teenage girl, instead of the luxurious lifestyle brought by her newfound fame, to ensure her fans could relate to her songs: "I really try to write more about what I feel and guys and love because that's what fascinates me more than anything else – love and what it does to us and how we treat people and how they treat us. So pretty much every song on the album has a face that I associate with it."

Swift usually started writing by identifying a core emotion she wanted to convey through the melody on guitar. For other songs, she sometimes came up with the title first before writing the hook. While some songs were inspired by Swift's personal relationships, she said that most songs were dramatized observations rather than real-life experiences: "I've gone through breakups and the core emotions behind them, but it doesn't take much to get that sort of emotion out in a song, luckily for me." She explained that certain emotions on her songs such as frustration or heartbreak came easily without her actually going through emotional turmoil. By July 2007, Swift had written as many as 75 songs. She recorded the album within a few months after touring with George Strait. Chapman, who produced Swift's debut, returned as producer, and recording took place at studios in Tennessee, including six in Nashville and one in Franklin.

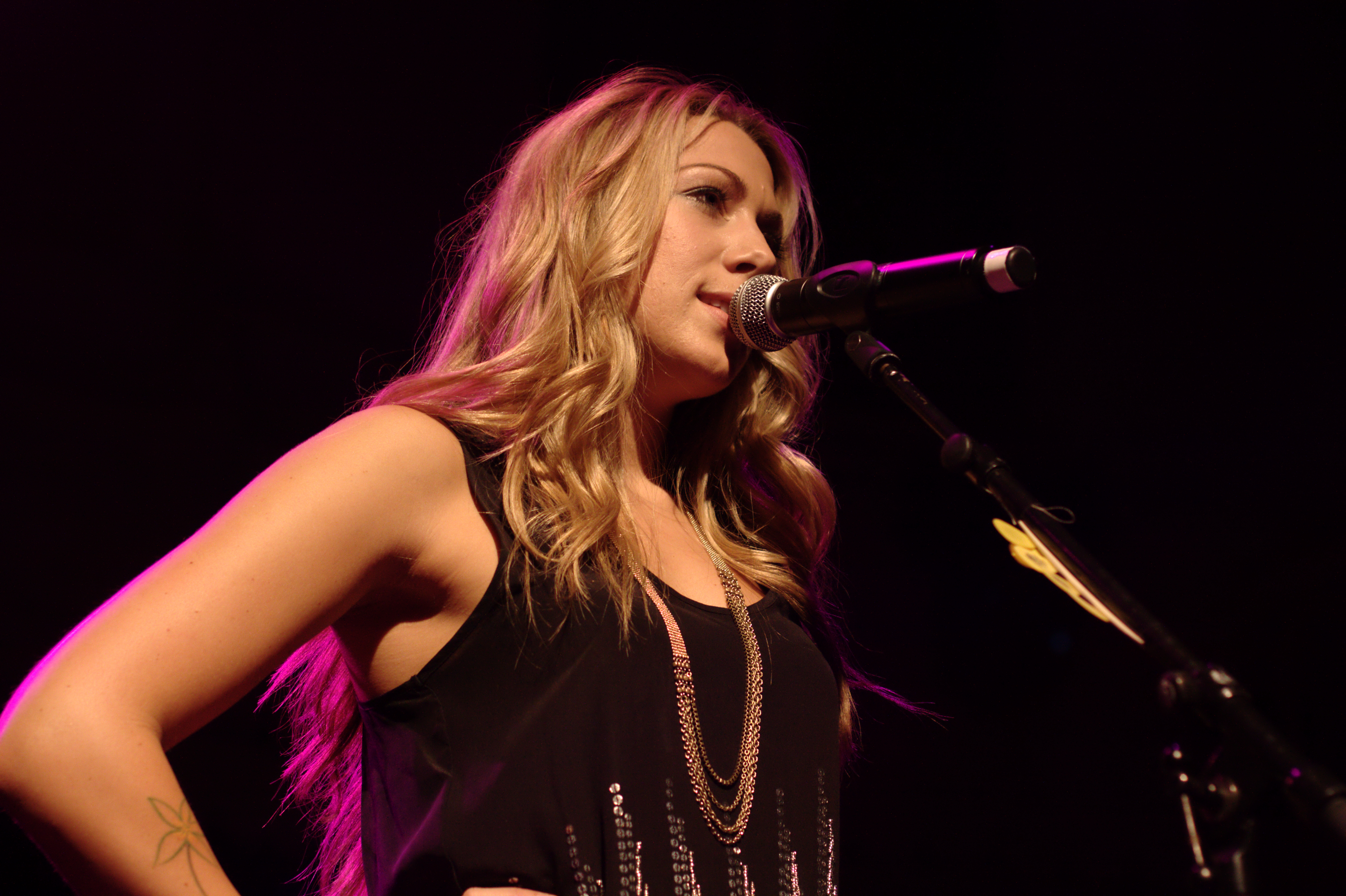
Swift wrote and recorded the song "Breathe" with Colbie Caillat (pictured in 2011).

During the recording sessions, Swift emphasized the authenticity of the songs' emotional sentiments over technical rigidity: "I think it's the writer in me that's a little more obsessed with the meaning of the song than the vocal technique." By March 2008, Swift had recorded six songs, including one co-written by and featuring Caillat, "Breathe"; Swift had used Caillat's 2007 song "Bubbly" as a reference point during the recording sessions, because of its simple arrangements and honest sentiments. Apart from newly penned songs, Swift recorded a few that she had written for her debut album, believing there were stories that deserved to be put out. Swift made her debut as a record producer, co-producing all tracks with Chapman. The standard edition consists of 13 tracks, which Swift had planned because she considered 13 her lucky number. Of the 13 tracks, Swift wrote seven by herself; the remaining were co-written with Caillat, Rose, Rich, and Hillary Lindsey. Recording took place within eight months and finished in October 2008, when Swift completed the track "Forever & Always" just before Fearless was mastered and published. The tracks "Change" and "Breathe" were recorded in December 2007.

== Composition ==
=== Lyrics ===
Like Swift's debut album, Fearless's prominent themes are love and life from a high school teenage girl's perspective. The songs in Fearless examine those themes with a more nuanced and mature observation. Swift embraced country music's narrative songwriting to convey her coming of age. She wrote the track "Fifteen" during her freshman high school year at Hendersonville High School. In the narrative, Swift and another girl named Abigail—her real-life high school friend—go through teenage love and heartbreak together. As the song concludes, Swift realizes she could accomplish more than dating high school senior boys. Music critics highlighted "Fifteen" as an example of Swift's songwriting about teenage themes, both with a starry-eyed innocence and a sense of nostalgia.

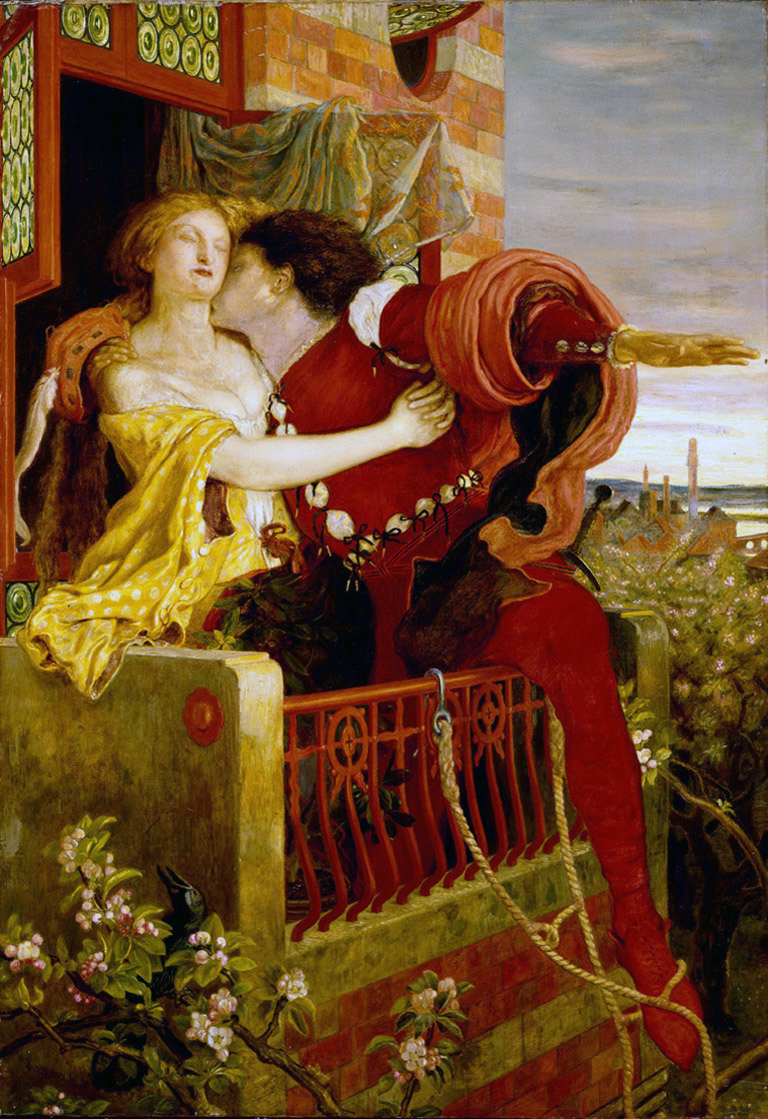
Swift wrote the lyrics to "Love Story" inspired by Shakespeare's Romeo and Juliet (pictured is a painting depicting a scene from the play).

Many of Fearless's songs are about starry-eyed romance and use imagery associated with fairy tales, such as princes, princesses, white horses, and kissing in the rain. The title track "Fearless" is Swift's imagination of a perfect first date, on which she is caught in her "best dress" in the rain. Inspired by a love interest unpopular to Swift's family and friends, "Love Story" is based on Romeo and Juliet by William Shakespeare. In the lyrics, Swift replaced the original story's conclusion with a marriage proposal, an ending she believed the two characters deserved. The optimistic "Love Story" is contradicted by "White Horse", which was inspired by the same love interest. In "White Horse", Swift is disillusioned that the love interest is not her ideal Prince Charming who could treat her like a princess after his unfaithfulness. "Hey Stephen" is about Swift's hidden feelings for Stephen Barker Liles of Love and Theft, a country band that had opened shows for her. Heartbreak and emotional tumult are explored in songs such as "Tell Me Why", about an on-and-off relationship with an informal love interest; "You're Not Sorry", with lyrics describing an unfaithful man; and "Forever & Always", inspired by Swift's breakup with the singer Joe Jonas.

Other songs were inspired by romantic relationships of Swift's friends. Swift wrote "You Belong with Me" after overhearing one of her band members speaking to his unsympathetic girlfriend over the phone. Out of sympathy, she wrote a story in which the protagonist harbors feelings for an out-of-reach love interest. The lyrics feature high school iconography, describing the protagonist as an ordinary girl "on the bleachers", and the antagonistic girlfriend as a popular cheer captain. In "The Way I Loved You", Swift sings about her passionate feelings for a complicated ex-lover, despite her current relationship with a decent boyfriend. Apart from romance, Fearless explores friendship, family love, and life lessons from Swift's underdog perspective. "Breathe" is about a fallout with a close friend. She dedicated "The Best Day" to her mother after they went shopping together because Swift was turned down by her schoolmates. The lyrics of "Change"—the closing track of the standard edition—detail Swift's determination to succeed despite her underdog status as a singer from a small, independent record label in Nashville. She finished writing "Change" the night she won the Horizon Award at the 2007 Country Music Association Awards.

=== Music ===
A country pop album, Fearless follows the country styling of Swift's debut album. The tracks are characterized by instruments associated with country music such as fiddle, banjo, mandolin, and acoustic guitar, intertwined with dynamic electric guitar and strings in the build-up. (Note: As described by such sources as The Boston Globe, The Guardian, and musicOMH) The production is consistent throughout: each song follows a recurring verse–chorus–bridge structure and has a dramatic bridge, a stripped-down final verse, and a dramatic final refrain.

Music critics debated the album's genre. Many considered Fearless more pop than country, citing the pop-friendly musical arrangements (Note: Attributed to such sources as AllMusic and the Chicago Tribune) and the elements of styles of pop, rock, and folk, namely teen pop, pop rock, and soft rock. (Note: Attributed to such sources as The Guardian, NPR, and Rolling Stone) According to Hazel Cills of Pitchfork, the country elements are minimal: Swift's "faux-country accent" and "a few bits" of banjo and fiddle scattered throughout. In the British newspaper The Guardian, Alexis Petridis said the country identifiers are limited to the lyrical references to God and "one-horse towns", and the production is "orthodontically perfect pop-rock" with Swift's melodies evoking "the pitiless efficiency of a Scandinavian pop factory". Swift, in an interview with The Philadelphia Inquirer, responded to the critical debate: "[Whether] you tell stories about how you live on a farm and cherish your family and God, or whether you tell stories about being in high school and being cheated on, they're stories about your life. That's what makes me a country artist." Some retrospective reviews deemed Fearless a record steeped in country music; The Daily Telegraph's James Lachno described the sound as "country bubblegum-pop".

"The Way I Loved You"
"The Way I Loved You" features grunge-inspired distorted electric guitars, exhibiting diverse musical influences in addition to the album's country pop production.

Many of the songs contain a radio–friendly pop production, demonstrated through tracks such as "Fearless", "Fifteen", "Love Story", "You Belong with Me", "Tell Me Why", "The Way I Loved You", and "Change". The musicologist James E. Perone commented that the songs contain hints of country, pop, folk, and alternative rock with their instrumental mix. "You Belong with Me" has a banjo–led country pop production in the verses and new wave–inspired electric guitars in the buildup, with elements of 1980s new wave rock portrayed by the repeated eighth notes joined by fiddle, mandolin, and guitar. "Tell Me Why" opens with country fiddles and incorporates influences of 1990s alternative rock and hip-hop in the syncopated drum beats and rock in the guitar instrumentation. The dynamic "The Way I Loved You" features distorted electric guitars with textual shifts that recall 1990s grunge. The ballads "White Horse" and "You're Not Sorry" also have pop hooks. The standard edition's penultimate track, "The Best Day", features a stripped-down country rock production with guitar strums.

== Release and promotion ==
=== Packaging ===
Swift named the album Fearless inspired by the title track: "[Being] fearless doesn't mean you're completely unafraid and it doesn't mean that you're bulletproof. It means that you have a lot of fears, but you jump anyway." All the songs on the album reflected her "fearless" attitude to embrace the hardships and challenges in love and life. Swift was the booklet's designer; Joseph Anthony Barker, Ash Newell, and Sheryl Nields were responsible for the photography; and Leen Ann Ramey designed the cover artwork. The 13-track standard edition was released on November 11, 2008, by Big Machine Records. An international edition featuring three bonus tracks—"Our Song", "Teardrops on My Guitar", and "Should've Said No"—was released on March 9, 2009, by Big Machine in partnership with Universal Music Group.

Swift announced a reissue of Fearless, subtitled Platinum Edition, on September 10, 2009. The reissue was released on October 26, 2009. The Platinum Edition package includes a CD and a DVD; the CD features six additional songs—"Jump Then Fall", "Untouchable", "Forever & Always" (Piano Version), "Come in with the Rain", "SuperStar", and "The Other Side of the Door"—placed prior to the original tracks. The DVD comprises the music videos for "Change", "The Best Day", "Love Story", "White Horse", and "You Belong with Me"; behind-the-scenes footage for the latter three; behind-the-scene footage from the first concert of the Fearless Tour; and "Thug Story"—a video Swift filmed with the rapper T-Pain exclusively for the 2009 CMT Music Awards. "Untouchable" is a cover of a 2007 song by the rock band Luna Halo; its lyrics and arrangement were rewritten by Swift, leading to her earning a writing credit on her version.

=== Marketing ===
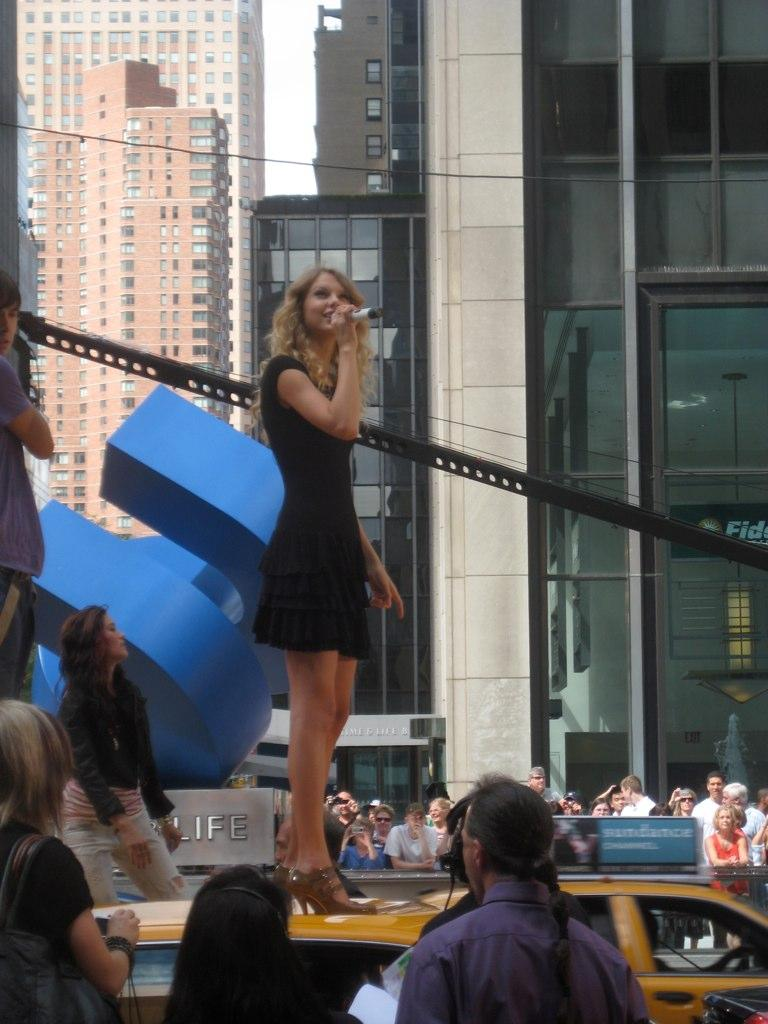
Swift rehearsing "You Belong with Me" for the 2009 MTV Video Music Awards; her acceptance speech for Best Female Video was interrupted by the rapper Kanye West, which prompted widespread media coverage.

On June 8, 2008, Swift performed songs from Fearless on Clear Channel's Stripped; the performance was recorded and included in the Platinum Edition reissue. Prior to the album's commercial release, "Change" was made available via the iTunes Store on August 8 as a promotional single. It was included on the AT&T Team USA Soundtrack, a compilation of songs played during the United States' participation in the 2008 Summer Olympics. A digital campaign launched through the iTunes Store, called "Countdown to Fearless", featured one song released each week during the five weeks leading to the album's release. "Breathe" was released as a promotional single exclusively via Rhapsody on October 21, 2008.

Swift made many television appearances to promote Fearless throughout late 2008, performing on shows including The Ellen DeGeneres Show, Good Morning America, and Late Night with David Letterman. A special CMT Crossroads episode featuring Swift and rock band Def Leppard singing each other's songs was recorded on October 6 at the Roy Acuff Theater in Nashville, and aired on CMT on November 7, 2008. Her performances at awards shows that year included the Country Music Association Awards and the American Music Awards.

Besides live appearances, Swift used her MySpace account to promote to a young audience, sharing snippets of songs for streaming before they were released to radio, as she had done with her debut album. She continued to appear on televised events through 2009, hosting Saturday Night Live, and performing at awards shows including the 51st Annual Grammy Awards, the CMT Music Awards, and the Country Music Association Awards. At the 2009 MTV Video Music Awards, the rapper-producer Kanye West interrupted Swift's acceptance speech for winning Best Female Video with "You Belong with Me"—an incident known as "Kanyegate", which received widespread media coverage and led to a longer feud.

Five songs were released as singles from Fearless. The lead single, "Love Story", was released on September 15, 2008. It peaked atop Hot Country Songs and was the first country song to reach number one on Pop Songs, a Billboard chart monitoring pop radio in the United States. The single peaked at number four on the US Billboard Hot 100, number two on the UK Singles Chart, and number one in Australia. The four remaining singles were "White Horse" (December 8, 2008), "You Belong with Me" (April 20, 2009), "Fifteen" (August 31, 2009), and "Fearless" (January 4, 2010). All four peaked within the top 40 of the Billboard Hot 100, with "You Belong with Me" peaking at number two, and within the top ten of Hot Country Songs, with "You Belong with Me" reaching number one. (Note: "White Horse", "Fifteen", and "Fearless" peaked at numbers two, seven, and ten, respectively.) Similar to "Love Story", "You Belong with Me" was a crossover success, becoming the first country song to top the all-genre Radio Songs chart, driven mostly by non-country airplay. According to Nielsen SoundScan, "Love Story" and "You Belong with Me" were the two most-played songs on US radio throughout 2009.

=== Touring ===
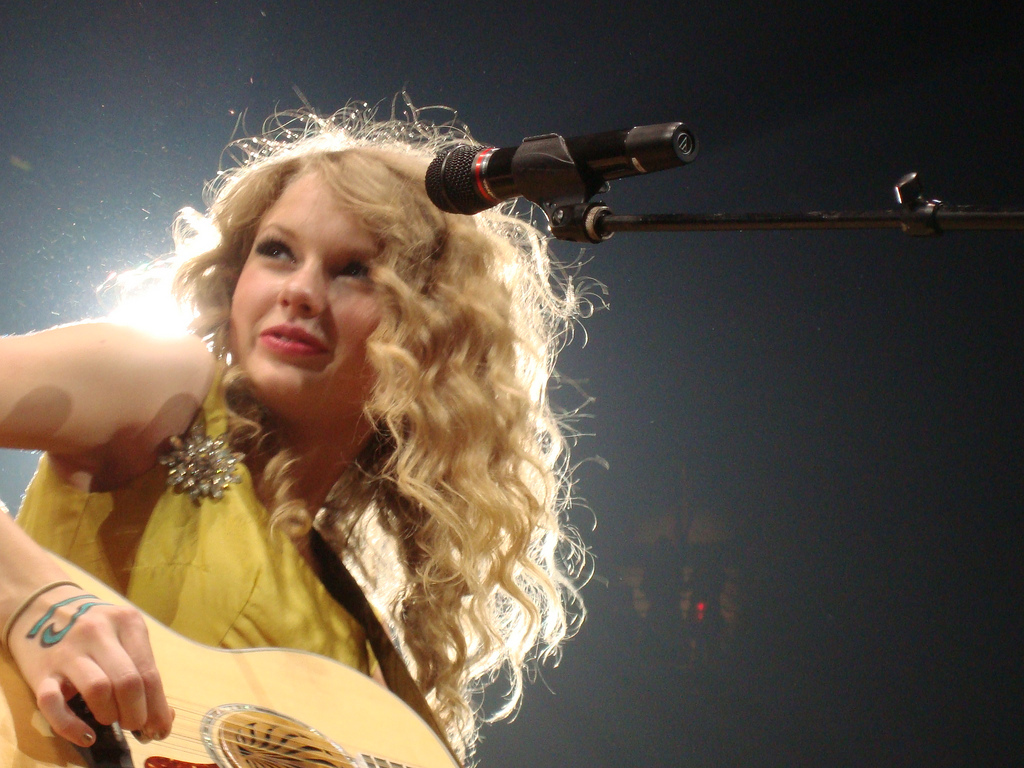
Swift performing on the Fearless Tour (pictured in 2010)

Swift announced the Fearless Tour, her first headlining tour, in January 2009. The tour started in Evansville, Indiana on April 23, and visited the United States and Canada over six months. Prior to the Fearless Tour, Swift headlined three music festivals: the San Antonio Stock Show & Rodeo in February 2009, and the Houston Livestock Show and Rodeo and the Florida Strawberry Festival in March. In October, when the first North American leg finished, Swift announced a second North American leg beginning on March 4, 2010, in Tampa, Florida. Outside North America, the Fearless Tour visited Australia and Japan in February 2010. The tour was met with high demand, selling out tickets within minutes. Swift wrapped up the North American leg at the Gillette Stadium in Foxborough, Massachusetts on June 5, 2010. The tour grossed over $63 million and played to over 1.1 million fans.

== Commercial performance ==
A commercial success in the United States, Fearless set many chart records and catapulted Swift to mainstream prominence. On the Billboard 200, it debuted at number one with first-week sales of 592,000 copies and spent 11 non-consecutive weeks at number one—the longest run for a female country album and for any album in the 2000s decade. It is the album with the most top-40 entries on the Billboard Hot 100 (13, including tracks from the Platinum Edition). (Note: "Fearless", "Fifteen", "Love Story", "White Horse", "You Belong with Me", "Forever & Always", "You're Not Sorry", "Change", "Jump Then Fall", "Untouchable", "Come In with the Rain", "SuperStar", and "The Other Side of the Door") Five tracks peaked within the top 10: "Fearless", "Love Story", "You Belong with Me", "Change", and "Jump Then Fall". On the Top Country Albums chart, Fearless spent 35 weeks at number one, becoming the female album with the second-longest weeks at number one, behind Shania Twain's Come On Over (1997, 50 weeks).

With 3.217 million copies sold in the United States, throughout 2009, Fearless was the year's best-selling album in the country. The achievement made Swift, then 20 years old, the youngest artist and the only female country musician to have a best-selling album of a calendar year. It was the only album from the 2000s decade to spend its first full year in the top 10 of the Billboard 200 and spent a total of 58 weeks in the top 10—a record for a country musician. By January 2024, Fearless had sold 7.285 million copies in the United States. In September 2025, the Recording Industry Association of America certified the album 11-times platinum for surpassing 11 million album-equivalent units based on sales and streams. It was the first of Swift's albums to cross the diamond certification threshold.

Fearless marked Swift's international breakthrough. It peaked atop the charts of Canada and New Zealand and within the top five of Australia (number two), Scotland (number four), and the United Kingdom (number five). It received multi-platinum certifications in Ireland and the United Kingdom (double platinum), Canada (four-times platinum), New Zealand (six-times platinum), and Australia (eight-times platinum). The album reached the top 10 in Japan, and top 20 in Austria, Brazil, Germany, Greece, and Sweden. It was certified gold in Japan, Germany, Austria, and Norway; platinum in Denmark; double-platinum in Singapore, and nine-times platinum in the Philippines. As of April 2021, the album had sold 12 million copies worldwide.

== Critical reception ==
Contemporaneous professional ratings
Aggregate scores
Source	Rating
Metacritic	73/100
Review scores
Source	Rating
AllMusic (Note: Upon release, AllMusic gave Fearless a four stars rating. The site reassessed the album with a four and a half stars rating since at least 2012, and awarded the album a five stars rating in 2018.)	5/5 stars
Blender	4/5 stars
Entertainment Weekly	B
The Guardian	3/5 stars
MSN Music (Consumer Guide)	A−
The Observer	4/5 stars
Q	2/5 stars
Rolling Stone	4/5 stars
Slant Magazine	2.5/5 stars
USA Today	3/4 stars

Fearless received generally positive reviews from music critics in the press. On Metacritic, which assigns an aggregated score out of 100 to reviews in mainstream publications, the album earned a score of 73, based on 14 reviews.

Many critics lauded Swift's songwriting craftsmanship. Reviews published in The Boston Globe, Blender, Entertainment Weekly, The Village Voice, and USA Today remarked that Fearless was an honest and vulnerable record contrasting with albums by other teenage singers, thanks to Swift's self-penned songs. Other reviews from AllMusic, Billboard, and The Observer deemed the lyrics mature for her age. In MSN Music, Robert Christgau found the album's romantic idealism distasteful, but he lauded Swift's songwriting skills as remarkable for a teenage artist. Jonathan Keefe from Slant Magazine agreed the songs were well-written but felt they fell short of refinement.

Some critics praised Fearless's crossover appeal. AllMusic's Stephen Thomas Erlewine and The Boston Globe's James Reed remarked that the album straddled the perceived boundary between country and pop; the former called it "one of the best mainstream pop albums of 2008". In Rolling Stone, Jody Rosen hailed Swift as a "songwriting savant with an intuitive gift for the verse-chorus-bridge architecture". Writing for L Magazine, Tom Breihan hailed the album as "ridiculously crisp" with every production element being "exactly where it needs to be", and commended Swift as the foremost pop musician of her time. Christgau commented that the songs were effective partly because of "the musical restraint of a strain of Nashville bigpop that avoids muscle-flexing rockism".

Other reviewers were divided over the production. Chris Richards of The Washington Post commended the radio-friendly tunes, but he commented that the album was repetitive overall. Although Richards praised Swift's vocals for what he deemed a "chirpy cadence" that made her assign "fresh notes to almost every syllable", Keefe deemed her voice weak and strained, which blemished the album with occasional breath controls and nasal tones. Petridis found the praise in the American press surprising: though he agreed Swift's songwriting was remarkable, he found the music "bland and uninventive", which occasionally left the audience "wondering if the world really needs any more music like this". The British magazine Q wrote: "Her giggly peers will find she speaks their language, while grown-ups will prefer her to keep quiet."

== Accolades ==
Fearless featured on 2008 year-end lists by the Associated Press (7th), Blender (32nd), Rolling Stone (39th), and The Village Voice's Pazz & Jop (58th); and 2009 year-end list by The Guardian (40th). Jon Caramanica in The New York Times placed the album at number four on his list of 2008's best albums and called Swift "one of pop's finest songwriters, country's foremost pragmatist and more in touch with her inner life than most adults".

The most-awarded country album in history, Fearless won Album of the Year at both the Country Music Association (CMA) Awards and the Academy of Country Music (ACM) Awards in 2009. It was honored as the Top Selling Album by the Canadian Country Music Association in 2009 and 2010. At the American Music Awards of 2009, Fearless won Favorite Country Album and was nominated for Favorite Pop/Rock Album. Its other accolades included a Teen Choice Award for Choice Female Album, a SiriusXM Indie Award for International Album of the Year, and a Juno Award nomination for International Album of the Year.

At the 52nd Annual Grammy Awards in February 2010, Fearless won Album of the Year and Best Country Album. The Album of the Year made 20-year-old Swift the youngest artist to win the award—a record she held until 18-year-old Billie Eilish won Album of the Year at the 62nd Annual Grammy Awards in 2020. Swift is the second country artist to win the three highest awards for a country album by the ACM, the CMA, and the Grammys—after the Chicks with Fly (1999)—and the first to further win the Grammy for Album of the Year for the same album. "White Horse" won two Grammy Awards that year: Best Female Country Vocal Performance and Best Country Song.

== Impact ==
Fearless's critical and commercial successes earned Swift mainstream popularity beyond country music. The widespread success of "Love Story" and "You Belong with Me" particularly attracted criticism against her identity as a country artist, with several commentaries labelling her a pop artist. Perone wrote that Fearless moved Swift's status from a "singer-songwriter prodigy to singer-songwriter superstar", highlighting the critical praise that she received. He also attributed the album's high sales to Swift's savvy marketing: with enhanced bonus material for the CD instead of download, Fearless became "indicative of a 21st century marketing trend in CD recordings". Swift's rising fame prompted media scrutiny on her public image; despite her popularity with teenage girls, some feminist writers took issue with Fearless's themes, such as pining for boys and competing against girls, as antifeminist and harmful to her audience.

Fearless ... has endured – not so much for the banjos and mandolins Swift geared to country radio, but for its teen-pop tension between happy-ending romances and bitter reflections on youthful naïveté, neatly chiseled into Swift's terse lyrics.

— Jon Pareles, The New York Times (2021)

Swift's songwriting on Fearless embodied the "Swiftian" confessional narratives that became emblematic in her artistry. (Note: Attributed to such sources as Vulture, The New Yorker, and The Independent) In a 2019 review for Pitchfork, Cills commented that the simplicity and earnestness of Fearless were a testament to Swift's abilities of writing timeless songs. According to Cills, whereas other teen idols were often sexualized, it was refreshing that Swift wrote about teenage experiences "in her own terms, [...] "redefining what 'teen pop' could sound like in the process". Other retrospective reviews attributed the album's enduring popularity to the universal feelings that it evokes—heartbreak, frustration, first love, and aspirations. (Note: Attributed to such sources as the i, The Line of Best Fit, and Billboard)

In 2024, Spin deemed Fearless the best album by Swift, upholding it as "a masterpiece of high school anxiety and adolescent heartbreak". Caramanica ranked Fearless the second-best in Swift's 11-album discography: he said that the album solidified Swift's success in country music while its songwriting retained her teenage earnestness that had been frequently overlooked in the industry, which was a "powerful" feat both artistically and commercially. Fearless placed at number 99 on NPR's "150 Greatest Albums Made by Women" (2017), number 11 on Billboard's "Greatest of All Time Top Country Albums" (2016), number 10 on Rolling Stone's "100 Greatest Country Albums of All Time" (2022), and number 3 on Billboard's "Top Billboard 200 Albums of the 21st Century" (2025). According to Billboard's Andrew Unterberger, the album popularized country music to teenage girls and its Grammy win for Album of the Year proved Swift as "one of the most important singer-songwriters of her generation".

Swift began re-recording her first six studio albums, including Fearless, in November 2020. The decision came after a public dispute between her and the music executive Scooter Braun, who acquired the masters of Swift's first six studio albums—which Swift had been trying to buy for years—following her departure from Big Machine Records in November 2018. The re-recording of Fearless, subtitled Taylor's Version, was released on April 9, 2021, through Republic Records. Fearless (Taylor's Version) contains re-recordings of all tracks from the Platinum Edition and the Valentine's Day soundtrack single "Today Was a Fairytale" (2010), and new recordings of six previously unreleased "From the Vault" tracks. Following the release of Fearless (Taylor's Version), the original album reached a new peak on charts in Austria (number two), Germany (number two), and Switzerland (number three). The ownership of the original album was sold back to Swift on May 30, 2025, alongside her other five albums released under Big Machine.

== Track listing ==
All tracks are produced by Swift and Nathan Chapman.

Standard edition
No.	Title	Writer(s)	Length
1.	"Fearless"	Taylor Swift; Liz Rose; Hillary Lindsey	4:01
2.	"Fifteen"	Swift	4:54
3.	"Love Story"	Swift	3:55
4.	"Hey Stephen"	Swift	4:14
5.	"White Horse"	Swift; Rose	3:54
6.	"You Belong with Me"	Swift; Rose	3:51
7.	"Breathe" (featuring Colbie Caillat)	Swift; Caillat	4:23
8.	"Tell Me Why"	Swift; Rose	3:20
9.	"You're Not Sorry"	Swift	4:21
10.	"The Way I Loved You"	Swift; John Rich	4:03
11.	"Forever & Always"	Swift	3:45
12.	"The Best Day"	Swift	4:05
13.	"Change"	Swift	4:40
Total length:			53:26

Platinum edition
No.	Title	Writer(s)	Length
1.	"Jump then Fall"	Swift	3:56
2.	"Untouchable"	Cary Barlowe; Nathan Barlowe; Tommy Lee James; Swift	5:11
3.	"Forever & Always" (piano version)	Swift	4:27
4.	"Come In with the Rain"	Swift; Rose	3:58
5.	"Superstar"	Swift; Rose	4:21
6.	"The Other Side of the Door"	Swift	3:57
Total length:			79:16

=== Notes ===
- "Untouchable" is a reworked version of Luna Halo's "Untouchable" (2007), written by Cary Barlowe, Nathan Barlowe, and Tommy Lee James.
- "Superstar" is stylized as "SuperStar".
- An exclusive live version of "Tell Me Why" was included as the closing track on the standard edition for Napster.
- Target exclusive standard edition includes a DVD with behind the scenes footage of "Breathe" and "Change".
- International editions include the international mixes of "Love Story" (in lieu of the original), "Our Song", "Teardrops on My Guitar", and "Should've Said No", the latter three songs are produced solely by Chapman and were originally available in their original form on Swift's self-titled debut album (2006).
- The initial Australian release mirrors the standard edition of Fearless, a later reissue follows the international track list and album art and adds the US pop mix of "Love Story" as a closing track.
- Releases in European territories (excluding the United Kingdom and Ireland) include "Umbrella" and "Mary's Song (Oh My My My)", from the iTunes Live from SoHo extended play, and a three minute video interview, as Amazon MP3 bonus tracks on Fearless.
- The Japanese edition follows the international track listing and include four bonus tracks: "Beautiful Eyes", "Picture to Burn" (radio edit), "I'm Only Me When I'm with You", and "I Heart ?"
- Platinum edition places the original tracks after the six bonus songs, and includes a DVD which features the music videos for "Change", "The Best Day", "Love Story", "White Horse", and "You Belong with Me" with behind the scenes material for the last three videos, a Fearless Tour photo gallery and behind the scenes footage from the tour’s first show, and "CMT Awards Thug Story" featuring T-Pain.
- Walmart exclusive Platinum edition also includes live performances of "Love Story" and "You Belong with Me" from the V Festival.
- Target exclusive Platinum edition copies also include live performances of "Untouchable" and "Fearless" from Clear Channel's Stripped.

== Personnel ==
- Taylor Swift – lead vocals, producer, songwriter, vocal harmony, acoustic guitar, booklet design
- Nathan Chapman – producer, acoustic guitar, bass guitar, electric guitar, keyboard, Hammond organ, mandolin, mixing, percussion, piano, programming, steel guitar, vocal harmony
- Scott Borchetta – executive producer
- Sammie Allan – backing vocals
- Joseph Anthony Baker – photography
- Steve Blackmon – mixing assistant
- Drew Bollman – mixing assistant
- Andrew Bowers – finger snapping
- Nicholas Brown – finger snapping
- Nick Buda – drums
- Kenzie Butler – assistant engineer, engineer
- Colbie Caillat – finger snapping, guest appearance
- Jason Campbell – production coordinator
- Chad Carlson – engineer, mixing, sound recording
- Joseph Cassell – wardrobe stylist
- Todd Cassetty – enhanced recording
- Carolyn Cooper – finger snapping
- Burrus Cox – finger snapping
- Eric Darken – percussion, vibraphone
- Shawn Daughtry – mixing assistant
- Dan Dugmore – steel guitar
- Lauren Elcanv – finger snapping
- Caitlin Evanson – vocal harmony
- Kyle Ford – assistant engineer, engineer
- Kyle Ginther – assistant engineer, engineer
- Kenny Greenberg – electric guitar
- Jed Hackett – engineer
- Rob Hajacos – fiddle
- Tony Harrell – Hammond organ, keyboard, piano
- Amos Heller – bass guitar
- Claire Indie – cello
- John Keefe – drums
- Tim Lauer – Hammond organ, keyboard, piano
- Matt Legge – assistant engineer, engineer
- Tim Marks – bass guitar
- Delaney McBride – finger snapping
- Emma McBride – finger snapping
- Justin McIntosh – graphic design
- Grant Mickelson – electric guitar
- Ash Newell – photography
- Justin Niebank – mixing
- Sheryl Nields – photography
- Mark Petaccia – assistant engineer, engineer
- LeeAnn Ramey – cover art, graphic design
- Sandi Spika – hair stylist, make-up artist, wardrobe stylist
- Bryan Sutton – acoustic guitar, mandolin
- Whitney Sutton – copy coordinator
- Todd Tidwell – assistant engineer, engineer, mixing assistant
- Ilya Toshinsky – banjo
- Lorrie Turk – make-up artist
- Brady Wardlaw – hair stylist
- Hank Williams – mastering
- Brian David Willis – engineer
- Al Wilson – percussion
- Jonathan Yudkin – cello, string arrangements, strings

== Charts ==
=== Weekly charts ===
2008–2009 weekly chart performance
Chart (2008–2009)	Peak position
Australian Albums (ARIA)	2
Australian Country Albums (ARIA)	1
Austrian Albums (Ö3 Austria)	14
Belgian Albums (Ultratop Flanders)	52
Belgian Albums (Ultratop Wallonia)	68
Brazilian Albums (APBD)	18
Canadian Albums (Billboard)	1
Danish Albums (Hitlisten)	23
Dutch Albums (Album Top 100)	43
European Top 100 Albums (Billboard)	13
French Albums (SNEP)	26
German Albums (Offizielle Top 100)	12
Irish Albums (IRMA)	7
Japanese Albums (Oricon)	8
Mexican Albums (Top 100 Mexico)	37
New Zealand Albums (RMNZ)	1
Norwegian Albums (VG-lista)	5
Scottish Albums (Official Charts)	4
South African Albums (RISA)	6
Spanish Albums (Promusicae)	28
Swedish Albums (Sverigetopplistan)	12
Swiss Albums (Schweizer Hitparade)	35
UK Albums (Official Charts)	5
UK Country Albums (Official Charts)	1
US Billboard 200	1
US Top Country Albums (Billboard)	1

2019–2022 weekly chart performance
Chart (2019–2022) (Note: The chart positions listed below coincided with the release of the 2021 re-recording Fearless (Taylor's Version). In Austria, Germany, and Switzerland, the sales performance of the original Fearless was combined with that of Fearless (Taylor's Version).)	Peak position
Austrian Albums (Ö3 Austria)	2
German Albums (Offizielle Top 100)	2
Greek Albums (IFPI)	1
Swiss Albums (Schweizer Hitparade)	3
US Independent Albums (Billboard)	10

2024 weekly chart performance
Chart (2024)	Peak position
Portuguese Albums (AFP)	111

=== Year-end charts ===
2008 year-end charts
Chart (2008)	Position
US Billboard 200	66
US Top Country Albums (Billboard)	13

2009 year-end charts
Chart (2009)	Position
Australian Albums (ARIA)	4
Canadian Albums (Billboard)	2
European Albums (Billboard)	89
New Zealand Albums (RMNZ)	2
UK Albums (OCC)	46
US Billboard 200	1
US Top Country Albums (Billboard)	1

2010 year-end charts
Chart (2010)	Position
Australian Albums (ARIA)	17
Canadian Albums (Billboard)	14
Japanese Albums (Oricon)	75
New Zealand Albums (RMNZ)	31
UK Albums (OCC)	122
US Billboard 200	7
US Top Country Albums (Billboard)	2

2011 year-end charts
Chart (2011)	Position
US Billboard 200	88
US Top Country Albums (Billboard)	42

2012 year-end chart
Chart (2012)	Position
US Billboard 200	126

2013 year-end chart
Chart (2013)	Position
US Top Pop Catalog Albums (Billboard)	39

2017 year-end chart
Chart (2017)	Position
US Top Country Albums (Billboard)	65

2018 year-end chart
Chart (2018)	Position
US Top Country Albums (Billboard)	42

2019 year-end chart
Chart (2019)	Position
US Top Country Albums (Billboard)	46

2020 year-end chart
Chart (2020)	Position
US Top Country Albums (Billboard)	47

2021 year-end chart
Chart (2021)	Position
US Top Country Albums (Billboard)	44

2022 year-end chart
Chart (2022)	Position
US Top Country Albums (Billboard)	67

2023 year-end chart
Chart (2023)	Position
US Top Country Albums (Billboard)	43

=== Decade-end charts ===
2000s decade-end charts
Chart (2000–2009)	Position
Australian Albums (ARIA)	87
US Billboard 200	56
US Top Country Albums (Billboard)	10

2010s decade-end charts
Chart (2010–2019)	Position
Australian Albums (ARIA)	55
US Billboard 200	98
US Top Country Albums (Billboard)	31

=== All-time charts ===
All-time charts
Chart (1963–2015)	Position
US Billboard 200	4
US Billboard 200 (Women)	2
US Top Country Albums (Billboard)	11

== Certifications and sales ==
Certifications with pure sales where available
Region	Certification	Certified units/sales
Australia (ARIA)	8× Platinum	560,000^{‡}
Austria (IFPI Austria)	Gold	10,000^{*}
Canada (Music Canada)	4× Platinum	320,000^{^}
Denmark (IFPI Danmark)	Platinum	20,000^{‡}
GCC (IFPI Middle East)	Gold	3,000^{*}
Germany (BVMI)	Gold	100,000^{‡}
Ireland (IRMA)	2× Platinum	30,000^{^}
Italy (FIMI)	Gold	25,000^{‡}
Japan (RIAJ)	Gold	115,000 (Note: Japanese sales as of September 2010)
Philippines	9× Platinum	135,000 (Note: Philippine sales as of February 2011)
New Zealand (RMNZ)	6× Platinum	90,000^{‡}
Norway (IFPI Norway)	Gold	15,000^{*}
Poland (ZPAV)	Gold	10,000^{‡}
Singapore (RIAS)	2× Platinum	20,000^{*}
Switzerland (IFPI Switzerland)	Gold	15,000^{‡}
United Kingdom (BPI)	2× Platinum	600,000^{‡}
United States (RIAA)	11× Platinum	7,285,000 (Note: US sales as of January 2024)
^{*} Sales figures based on certification alone.^{^} Shipments figures based on certification alone.^{‡} Sales+streaming figures based on certification alone.

== Release history ==
List of release dates and formats
Date	Edition(s)	Format(s)	Ref.
November 11, 2008	Standard	CD; digital download	
March 9, 2009	Standard (international)	CD; digital download	
October 26, 2009	Platinum	CD and DVD; digital download; vinyl LP	

== See also ==
- Grammy Award records – Youngest artists to win Album of the Year
- List of Billboard 200 number-one albums of 2008
- List of Billboard 200 number-one albums of 2009
- List of Top Country Albums number ones of 2008
- List of Top Country Albums number ones of 2009
- List of Top Country Albums number ones of 2010
- List of number-one albums of 2008 (Canada)
- List of number-one albums from the 2000s (New Zealand)
- List of number-one country albums of 2010 (Australia)
- List of best-selling albums by women
- List of best-selling albums of the 21st century
- List of best-selling albums in the Philippines
- List of best-selling albums in the United States
