= List of Top Country Albums number ones of 2008 =

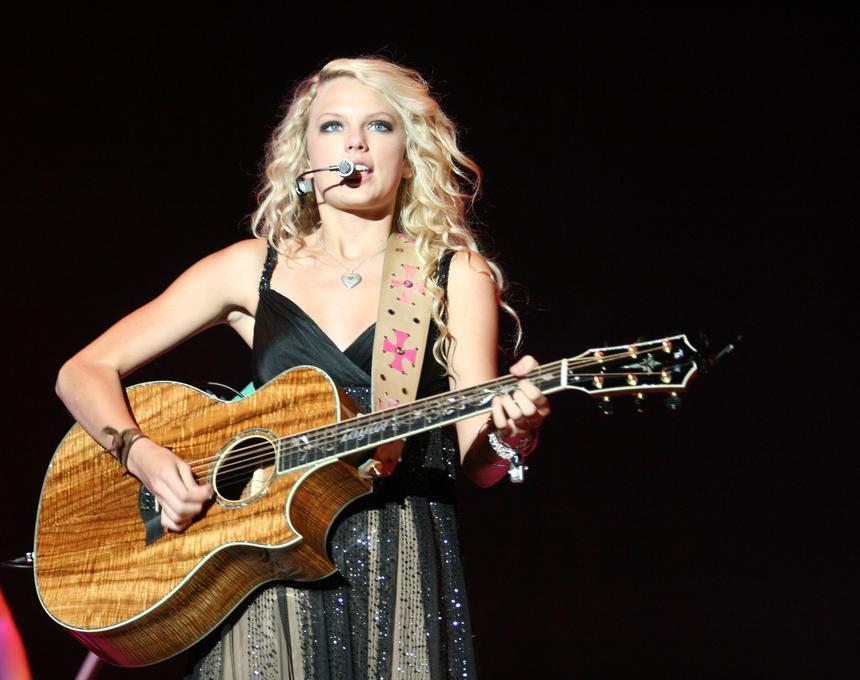
Taylor Swift had three number ones in 2008.

Top Country Albums is a chart that ranks the top-performing country music albums in the United States, published by Billboard. In 2008, 21 different albums topped the chart; placings were based on electronic point of sale data from retail outlets.

In the issue of Billboard dated January 5, the Eagles were at number one with Long Road Out of Eden, the album's sixth week in the top spot. Two weeks later, it was displaced by the self-titled album by Taylor Swift, which returned to number one having spent eight weeks atop the chart in 2007. The album spent a further 16 weeks at number one in 2008, in five separate spells atop the chart. Its final week at number one came in the issue of Billboard dated July 26, and the following week Swift replaced herself in the top spot when Beautiful Eyes entered the chart at number one. The new release, a limited-run EP available only at Walmart stores or online, held the top spot for a single week. Swift returned to number one in November with her second full-length album Fearless, which spent the final five weeks of the year atop the chart and made her the only act with three number ones during the year.

Two acts reached number one with two different albums in 2008. Tim McGraw unusually topped the chart with two different greatest hits albums: in May he spent a single week at number one with Greatest Hits: Limited Edition, a combined re-release of his first two such albums, which had each reached number one in their own right in 2000 and 2006. In October he returned to the top of the chart with the newly released Greatest Hits 3. Toby Keith spent time at number one with both 35 Biggest Hits and That Don't Make Me a Bad Guy. Several acts reached number one in 2008 for the first time, beginning with the group Lady Antebellum with its self-titled album in May. On June 7, Julianne Hough, best known as one of the professional dancers from the TV show Dancing with the Stars, spent a week at number one with her debut album. Two weeks later singer Jewel reached the top spot with her first release to enter the country chart; her albums had appeared on the all-genre Billboard 200 chart for more than a decade, but Perfectly Clear was her first recording in the country genre. The duo Sugarland spent six non-consecutive weeks at number one in August and September with its first chart-topper Love on the Inside, and in September and October Jessica Simpson and Darius Rucker both topped the chart for the first time. Rucker was the first African-American artist to become a major star in the country genre since Charley Pride in the late 1960s.

== Chart history ==
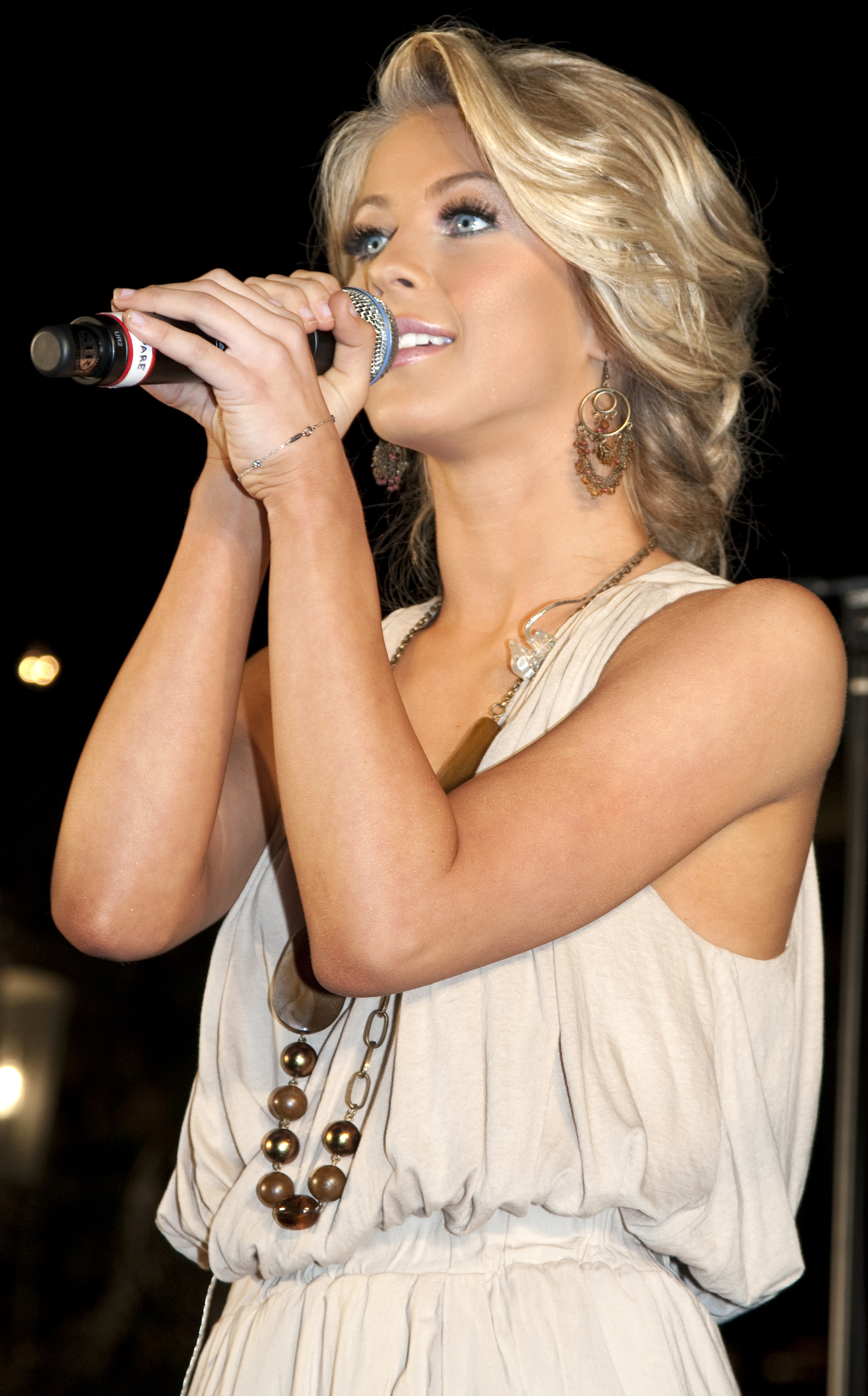
Julianne Hough topped the chart six months after she was half of the winning couple on TV's Dancing with the Stars for the second time.

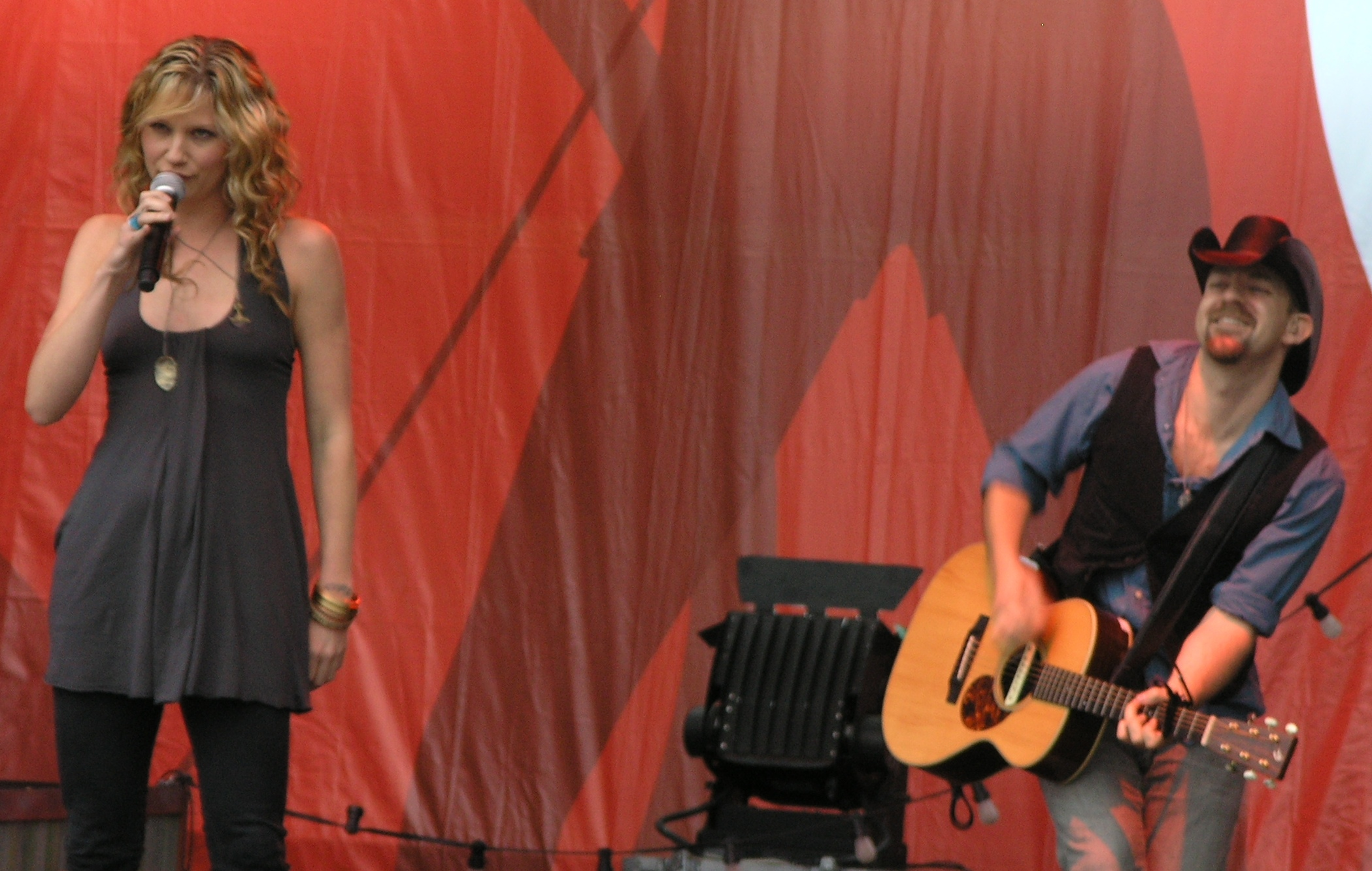
Sugarland spent six weeks at number one with Love on the Inside.

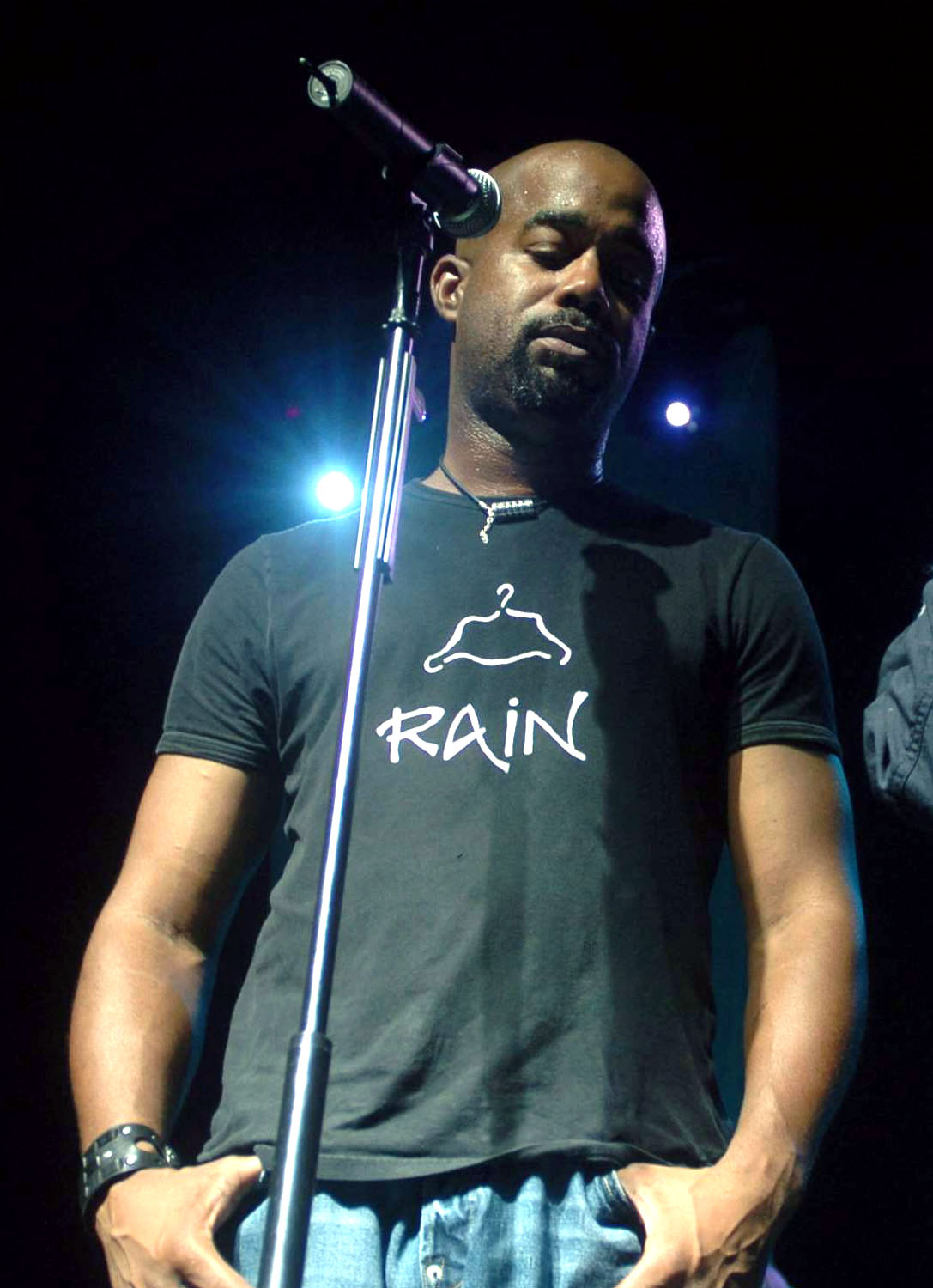
Learn to Live was the first number one for Darius Rucker.

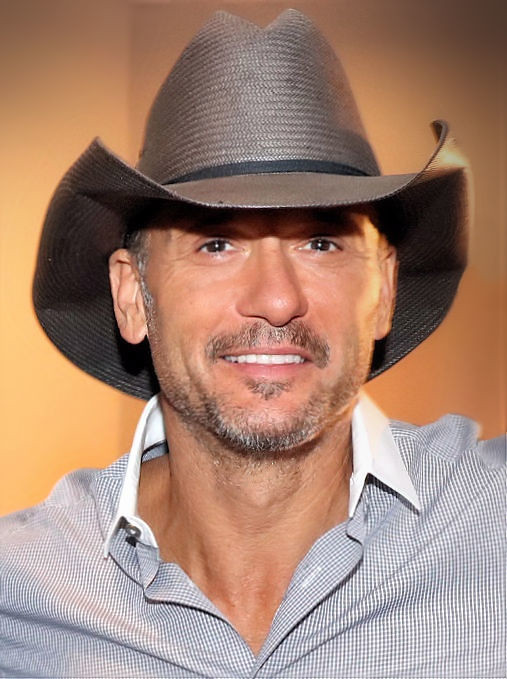
Tim McGraw topped the chart with two different greatest hits albums in 2008.

Issue date	Title	Artist(s)	Ref.
January 5	Long Road Out of Eden	Eagles	
January 12	Long Road Out of Eden	Eagles	
January 19	Taylor Swift	Taylor Swift	
January 26	Taylor Swift	Taylor Swift	
February 2	Taylor Swift	Taylor Swift	
February 9	Taylor Swift	Taylor Swift	
February 16	Taylor Swift	Taylor Swift	
February 23	Taylor Swift	Taylor Swift	
March 1	Taylor Swift	Taylor Swift	
March 8	My Life's Been a Country Song	Chris Cagle	
March 15	Taylor Swift	Taylor Swift	
March 22	Good Time	Alan Jackson	
March 29	Good Time	Alan Jackson	
April 5	Taylor Swift	Taylor Swift	
April 12	Taylor Swift	Taylor Swift	
April 19	Troubadour	George Strait	
April 26	Troubadour	George Strait	
May 3	Lady Antebellum	Lady Antebellum	
May 10	Troubadour	George Strait	
May 17	Greatest Hits: Limited Edition	Tim McGraw	
May 24	35 Biggest Hits	Toby Keith	
May 31	35 Biggest Hits	Toby Keith	
June 7	Julianne Hough	Julianne Hough	
June 14	Taylor Swift	Taylor Swift	
June 21	Perfectly Clear	Jewel	
June 28	Taylor Swift	Taylor Swift	
July 5	Taylor Swift	Taylor Swift	
July 12	Taylor Swift	Taylor Swift	
July 19	Taylor Swift	Taylor Swift	
July 26	Taylor Swift	Taylor Swift	
August 2	Beautiful Eyes	Taylor Swift	
August 9	Love on the Inside	Sugarland	
August 16	Love on the Inside	Sugarland	
August 23	Love on the Inside	Sugarland	
August 30	Love on the Inside	Sugarland	
September 6	Love on the Inside	Sugarland	
September 13	Now That's What I Call Country	Various Artists	
September 20	Love on the Inside	Sugarland	
September 27	Do You Know	Jessica Simpson	
October 4	Learn to Live	Darius Rucker	
October 11	Learn to Live	Darius Rucker	
October 18	Kellie Pickler	Kellie Pickler	
October 25	Greatest Hits 3	Tim McGraw	
November 1	Lucky Old Sun	Kenny Chesney	
November 8	Lucky Old Sun	Kenny Chesney	
November 15	That Don't Make Me a Bad Guy	Toby Keith	
November 22	Play	Brad Paisley	
November 29	Fearless	Taylor Swift	
December 6	Fearless	Taylor Swift	
December 13	Fearless	Taylor Swift	
December 20	Fearless	Taylor Swift	
December 27	Fearless	Taylor Swift	
