= Reality Check (band) =

Alternative rock band

- Genres: Alternative rock; CCM; Hip-hop rock; Alternative rap
- Years active: 1996–1998
- Label: Star Song Communications
- Spinoffs: Luna Halo
- Past members: Chris Blaney; Nathan Barlowe; Rod Shuler; Jonny MacIntosh; Dave Muckel; Jody Waldrop; Yinka Jolaoso; Steve Dale

Reality Check was an Alternative Rock band, that formed in the mid-1990s, with the support of Michael Tait, of DC Talk. Originally consisting of three members, Chris Blaney, Nathan Barlowe, and Rod Shuler, the band grew to eight members, before disbanding in 1998. Two members of Reality Check, Nathan Barlowe and Jonny MacIntosh, went on to help form Luna Halo.

== Musical career ==
After releasing an independent album, called Soulfood, Reality Check signed a deal with Star Song Communications, and released a self-titled album, on June 3, 1997. The next year, Reality Check disbanded for unknown reasons.

=== Music ===
Reality Check's sound could be described as a mix of PFR, and DC Talk.

==== Soulfood ====
Soulfood was the group's first album, released under the name Reality Check. Soulfood relied heavily on samples for the backing tracks, including beats from artists, such as the Beastie Boys, and House of Pain. This album featured a different sound than their later work, such as their self-titled album, and could best be defined as late 1980s hip-hop.
Tracks

- Positivity
- Temptation
- One Reason
- I Can't See
- Devil's In My Hair
- Praise On
- Step 2 Da Mic
- Friends
- Soulfood
- The Blood
- Role Models
- Bring It To The Cross

==== Self-titled Album (Reality Check) ====
This album contains two tracks, featuring Michael Tait. In the song "Apart From You", Tait can be heard singing the words, "apart from you", in the background, during the bridge. There is also a hidden prank call at 5:19, on the last track on the CD, where Tait, and friend, Jason Halbert, are called simultaneously in a prank three-way call. This track is not available on the cassette version.
Tracks

- The Way I Am
- Plastic
- Masquerade
- Carousel
- Know You Better
- Midnight Confessions
- Apart From You
- Time is Fading
- Speak To Me
- Losing Myself

== Members ==
- Nathan Barlowe - lead vocals, guitar
- Chris Blaney - vocals
- Josh Sampson - lead guitar
- Dave Muckel - horns, vocals
- Rod Shuler - vocals
- Steve Dale - bass guitar
- Yinka Jolaoso - percussion
- Jonathan MacIntosh - electric guitar
- Jody Waldrop - drums

== Music videos ==
- Masquerade

== Awards ==
- Academy of Gospel Music Arts' Spotlight `96 Best Artist
- 2 New Talent Showcase Awards at Atlantafest
