= The Way I Loved You =

2008 song by Taylor Swift

Song by Taylor Swift

from the album Fearless
- Released: November 11, 2008
- Genre: Country
- Length: 4:03
- Label: Big Machine
- Songwriters: Taylor Swift; John Rich
- Producers: Taylor Swift; Nathan Chapman

Audio video
- "The Way I Loved You" on YouTube

"The Way I Loved You (Taylor's Version)"

Song by Taylor Swift

from the album Fearless (Taylor's Version)
- Released: April 11, 2021
- Studio: Blackbird; Prime Recording (Nashville)
- Length: 4:03
- Label: Republic
- Songwriters: Taylor Swift; John Rich
- Producers: Taylor Swift; Christopher Rowe

Lyric video
- "The Way I Loved You (Taylor's Version)" on YouTube

"The Way I Loved You" is a song by the American singer-songwriter Taylor Swift from her second studio album, Fearless (2008). She wrote the song with John Rich and served as a producer with Nathan Chapman. Inspired by an encounter with a guy who seemed ideal to date with, it is about the rumination for an ex-lover despite being in a stable relationship. The song has a dynamic contemporary country production with a pop-oriented country and rock arrangement; it features a marching snare drum, and loud and subtle stringed instruments.

Early and retrospective reviews that were positive about the song generally praised Swift's songwriting, direction, and vocal performance. In the United States, "The Way I Loved You" peaked at number 72 on the Billboard Hot 100, and received a gold certification from the Recording Industry Association of America (RIAA). Swift included it as part of the regular set list of her Fearless Tour (2009–2010).

A re-recorded version of the song, "The Way I Loved You (Taylor's Version)", was included on the re-recording of Fearless, Fearless (Taylor's Version) (2021). The song charted in Canada, the US, and on the Billboard Global 200. It received platinum and silver certifications from the Australian Recording Industry Association (ARIA) in Australia, the Pro-Música Brasil (PMB) in Brazil, and the British Phonographic Industry (BPI) in the United Kingdom. The re-recording received mostly positive reviews from critics, but one criticized the lyrics as childish.

== Background and writing ==
Taylor Swift wrote songs for her second studio album, Fearless (2008), while touring as an opening act for fellow country musicians to promote her self-titled debut studio album during 2007–2008, when she was 17–18 years old. Continuing the romantic themes of the previous album, Swift wrote tracks about love and personal experiences from the perspective of a teenage girl to ensure her fans could relate to Fearless. Although much of the album contains autobiographical themes, some songs are based on her observations of other people's relationships. Swift said that nearly every album track had a "face" that she associated with it.

Swift was inspired to write "The Way I Loved You" after meeting a guy who seemed like the ideal person to be in a relationship with but felt that it would be not as exciting as dating a more toxic partner. She brought the song's concept to a writing session with the singer-songwriter John Rich to provide a different perspective. Swift said that Rich managed to relate to it "because he is that complicated, frustrating messy guy in his relationships". She added that it "was just so cool" to write with him and praised him as an "incredible writer". Rich, meanwhile, was impressed with Swift's writing at her age and how connected she was with her audience. The song was produced by her and Nathan Chapman, and mixed by Justin Nieback at Blackbird Studio in Nashville, Tennessee.

== Releases ==
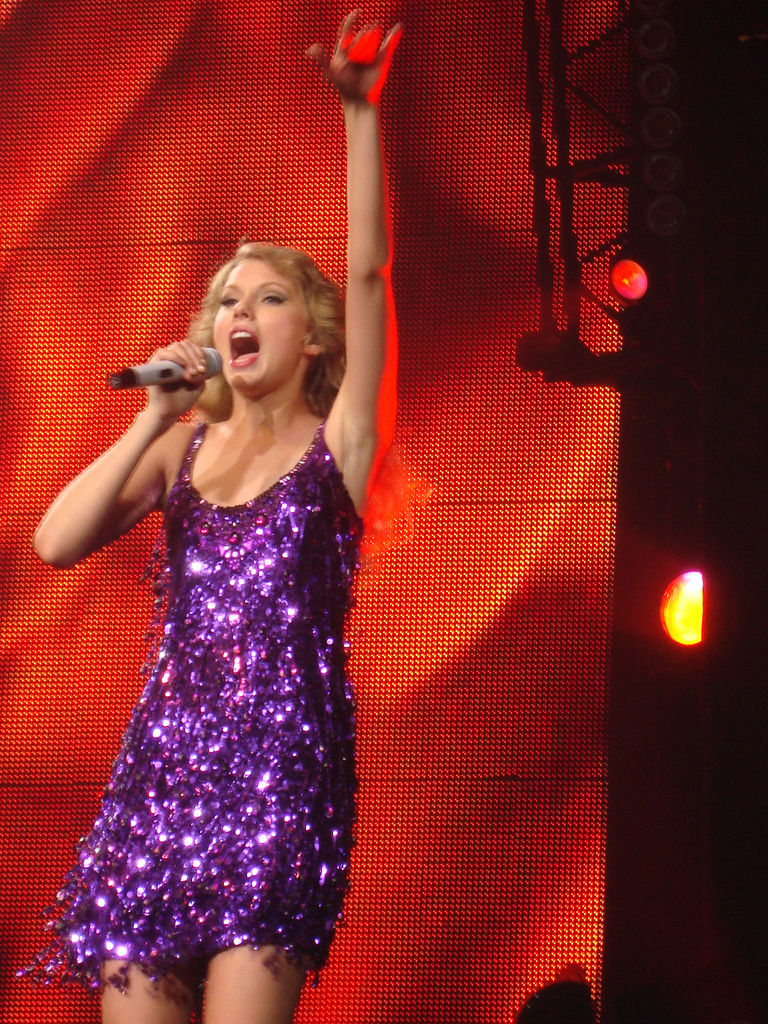
Swift on the Fearless Tour, where its set list featured "The Way I Loved You"

"The Way I Loved You" was released as the tenth track on Fearless on November 11, 2008, by Big Machine Records. In the United States, the song debuted and peaked at number 72 on the Billboard Hot 100. It is where also the Recording Industry Association of America (RIAA) gave the song a gold certification, which denotes 500,000 units based on sales and streaming. "The Way I Loved You" was included on the regular set list of Swift's first headlining concert tour, the Fearless Tour (2009–2010). She wore a purple sparkling dress while singing the track. On May 24, 2024, Swift performed the song as part of a mashup with her songs "Come Back... Be Here" (2012) and "The Other Side of the Door" (2008) during the Lisbon stop of her Eras Tour (2023–2024).

After signing a new contract with Republic Records, Swift began re-recording her first six studio albums in November 2020. The decision followed a public 2019 dispute between Swift and the talent manager Scooter Braun, who acquired Big Machine Records, including the masters of Swift's albums that the label had released. By re-recording the albums, Swift had full ownership of the new masters, which enabled her to control the licensing of her songs for commercial use and therefore substituted the Big Machine–owned masters. The re-recording of "The Way I Loved You" is subtitled as "(Taylor's Version)", and was released by Republic Records as part of the parent album's re-recording, Fearless (Taylor's Version), on April 11, 2021.

Swift and Christopher Rowe produced "The Way I Loved You (Taylor's Version)". It was recorded at Black Bird Studios and Prime Recording both in Nashville, Tennessee, and Swift's vocals were recorded at Kitty Committee Studios in London. The song was mixed at MixStar Studios in Virginia Beach, Virginia, and mastered at Sterling Sound in Edgewater, New Jersey. Upon the album's release, "The Way I Loved You (Taylor's Version)" reached the charts of the Canadian Hot 100 (60) and the Billboard Global 200 (93). In the United States, it debuted on the Billboard Hot 100 and Hot Country Songs, with peaks at 94 and 24, respectively. The song also received a platinum certifications from the Australian Recording Industry Association (ARIA) in Australia and the Pro-Música Brasil (PMB) in Brazil, and a silver certification from the British Phonographic Industry (BPI) in the United Kingdom.

== Music and lyrics ==
Musically, "The Way I Loved You" is a contemporary country song that runs for 4 minutes and 3 seconds. It features a dynamic production and a pop-oriented country and rock arrangement. The verses are led by a string quartet and a marching snare drum. The rest of the song is driven by distorted electric guitars, loud rock guitars, a subtly plucked banjo, an energetic violin, and a piano, the last two of which accompany the chorus. (Note: As described by the musicologist James E. Perone, NPR, and Chris Willman of Variety,) According to Jonathan Keefe from Slant Magazine, it features a "nearly a cappella bridge". Rolling Stone's journalist Jody Rosen believed that the song is "packed with loud, lean guitars and rousing choruses", while Nate Jones of Vulture thought the collaboration between Swift and Rich "may explain how stately and mid-tempo" it was. The re-recorded "The Way I Loved You (Taylor's Version)" has the same length as the original. The production has a similar arrangement and Swift's vocals on it were identified by critics as fuller, smoother, and at times more accented.

"The Way I Loved You"
A 19-second sample of the song's chorus, where Swift reminisces on a past relationship over loud and subtle stringed instruments

In the lyrics, Swift's character currently occupies a stable relationship but ruminates on a past, tumultuous romance. She previously dated a "wild and crazy" boyfriend prior to meeting her current lover who seems ideal for her and "makes all [her] single friends [...] jealous". The verses are about how good and sensible her new partner is; Swift wrote that the marching snare drum makes him seem stiff. The chorus sees her remembering the relationship with her previous boyfriend: "I miss screaming and fighting and kissing in the rain/ And it's 2 a.m., and I'm cursing your name." She expresses her yearning for him, although the current one is decent and could talk business with her father.

The lyrics contain motifs that recur in Swift's other songs, such as cars ("In the front seat of his car"), fake smiles ("He can't see the smile I'm faking"), and kissing in the rain, ("But I miss screaming and fighting and kissing in the rain"). Emily Lee from iHeartRadio felt that "The Way I Loved You" was the first Swift song to have a fictional narrative. Roisin O'Connor of The Independent said that the plotline recalled Katy Perry's "Thinking of You" (2009). Blender's writer Rob Sheffield thought the lover, while kind to Swift, "[does not] get her hot". James E. Perone, a musicologist, commented that the songwriting and production elements "suggest a country pop take on 1990s grunge". According to Variety's Chris Willman, the song's strings represent the current partner while the rock aspect of it encapsulates the previous boyfriend. For Gigwise, Kelsey Barnes said that the "constant build-up from each verse" evokes a type of "anxiety-inducing relationship" that the guy Swift is dating makes her feel nothing and makes her think of the other one.

== Critical reception ==
Initial reactions for "The Way I Loved You" were included in Fearless album reviews. Rosen viewed the song as one of the album's tracks that focused on "[extending Swift's] dominion beyond the country-music-loving red states". Dave Heaton from PopMatters picked the song as an example of "[symbolizing] the gap between how you know you should behave and what you deep down really want to do". Keefe thought it evoked Swift's previous "Avril Lavigne-esque sneer [...] hits", but panned her voice as weak.

Retrospective reviews were included in lists and rankings of Swift's discography. Hannah Dailey of Billboard believed "The Way I Loved You" was Swift "at her most delightfully dramatic – which, in many ways," defined Fearless. Lee viewed the song as one of the album's "most underrated" tracks and where it showcased Swift as a "master storyteller". Laura Dzubay from Consequence said the song should have been the lead single to Fearless instead of "Love Story" (2008) because of the "cleverly tilting verses and relentless chorus". Similarly, Alex Hopper of American Songwriter favored the track over "Love Story", argued that it was "more passionate", and deemed it a "fan-favorite". Hannah Mylrea of NME felt that the song, although a "bit of a head-banging country moment", is devoid of radio-friendly hooks and "megawatt moments of Swift's other tunes".

Reviewing "The Way I Loved You (Taylor's Version)", Katie Goh from The Guardian stated that the "overwhelming rush" of the lyrics capture the emotions felt by a teenager. Katie Moulton of Consequence thought Swift's more trained vocals on the re-recorded track give it "new life". Erin Browne from Vulture believed that the song "feels different sung in her 30s" because he felt that Swift "does not miss" the relationship. Callie Ahlgrim of Business Insider thought the song best exemplified Swift's growth as a vocalist and that the production was polished and mastered. Kelsey Barnes from Gigwise believed that it was an "deeply underrated" song that "will get its justice in the re-recordings" and one of her best tracks. Willman highlighted it as one of the many album tracks that "stood the test of time", but Keefe believed that the song's imagery "[remained] juvenile".

== Personnel ==
"The Way I Loved You"

- Taylor Swift – vocals, songwriting, production
- John Rich – songwriting
- Nathan Chapman – production
- Chad Carlson – recording
- Justin Niebank – mixing
- Steve Blackmon – additional mixing

"The Way I Loved You (Taylor's Version)"

- Taylor Swift – lead vocals, songwriting, production
- John Rich – songwriting
- Christopher Rowe – production, vocal recording, backing vocals
- Amos Heller – bass
- Jonathan Yudkin – strings
- Matt Billingslea – drums
- Max Bernstein – electric guitar
- Mike Meadows – acoustic guitar, piano, banjo
- Paul Sidoti – electric guitar
- John Hanes – engineering
- Derek Garten – digital editing, additional engineering
- Lowell Reynolds – digital editing, additional engineering
- David Payne – recording
- Serban Ghenea – mixing
- Randy Merrill – mastering

== Charts ==
Chart performance for "The Way I Loved You"Chart performance
Chart (2008)	Peak position
US Billboard Hot 100	72

Chart performance for "The Way I Loved You (Taylor's Version)"
Chart (2021)	Peak position
Canada Hot 100 (Billboard)	60
Global 200 (Billboard)	93
US Billboard Hot 100	94
US Hot Country Songs (Billboard)	24

== Certifications ==
Certifications for "The Way I Loved You"
Region	Certification	Certified units/sales
Spain (Promusicae)	Gold	30,000^{‡}
United States (RIAA)	Gold	500,000^{‡}
^{‡} Sales+streaming figures based on certification alone.

Certifications for "The Way I Loved You (Taylor's Version)"
Region	Certification	Certified units/sales
Australia (ARIA)	Platinum	70,000^{‡}
Brazil (Pro-Música Brasil)	Platinum	40,000^{‡}
New Zealand (RMNZ)	Gold	15,000^{‡}
United Kingdom (BPI)	Silver	200,000^{‡}
^{‡} Sales+streaming figures based on certification alone.
