= Luna Halo (album) =

Studio album by Luna Halo
- Released: 30 October 2007
- Recorded: 2005–2006
- Genre: Rock
- Length: 36:51
- Language: English
- Label: American Recordings/Columbia
- Producer: Rick Rubin (exec.), Neal Avron

Luna Halo chronology
Tour (2006)	Luna Halo (2007)	Thank You... Goodnight (2012)

Luna Halo is the second studio album by the American rock band Luna Halo. It was released on October 30, 2007 on American Recordings, marking their first major label release.

The band shot a music video for the second track "Untouchable." It was also heard on the 4th episode of the Canadian animated sitcom Stoked.

American singer-songwriter Taylor Swift also covered the song in a country pop style and even reworked some of the lyrics for the Platinum Edition (2009) of her second album, Fearless (2008). She re-recorded the cover as part of her first re-recorded album, Fearless (Taylor's Version) (2021).

== Critical reception ==
Professional ratings
Review scores
Source	Rating
AllMusic	4/5 stars
Cross Rhythms	9/10
IGN	6.9/10
Melodic	4/5 stars

The album received positive reviews from critics. Writing for AllMusic, Jared Johnson called the album "a catchy rock record with an authentic indie punch, guaranteed to please fans of the "newest" new wave". In IGN, Chad Grischow gave the album "okay" score and said "the album's singular focus on love gets old after a bit, making Luna Halo's otherwise solid album best taken in small doses". In a positive review for Cross Rhythms, Mike Rimmer called the album a "meaty, bouncy rock'n'roll with the hookiest of choruses piled on top of swathes of guitars and driving rhythms". Kaj Roth from Melodic gave the album 4 out of 5 stars and stated that "their Britrock influenced modern rock sound is irresistable".

== Track listing ==
All tracks are produced by Rick Rubin and Neal Avron.

Luna Halo track listing
No.	Title	Writer(s)	Length
1.	"Kings & Queens"	Nathan Barlowe, Jason Nesmith	3:19
2.	"Untouchable"	Cary Barlowe, N. Barlowe, Tommy Lee James	3:32
3.	"Medicate"	N. Barlowe, Dave Bassett	3:17
4.	"I'm Alright"	C. Barlowe, N. Barlowe, Bassett	2:35
5.	"On My Way"	C. Barlowe, N. Barlowe, Chris Coleman, Aaron Jenkins	3:06
6.	"On Your Side"	C. Barlowe, N. Barlowe, Coleman	4:04
7.	"The Fool"	C. Barlowe, N. Barlowe, Jenkins, Kevin Max	3:29
8.	"Big Escape"	C. Barlowe, N. Barlowe, Coleman, Jenkins	3:26
9.	"Falling Down"	C. Barlowe, N. Barlowe, James	3:30
10.	"English Boys"	C. Barlowe, N. Barlowe	3:45
11.	"World On Fire"	C. Barlowe, N. Barlowe, Jenkins, Max	2:48
Total length:			36:51
