= Grammy Award for Best Pop Collaboration with Vocals =

American music award

- Awarded for: Quality collaborative pop performances with vocals
- Country: United States
- Presented by: National Academy of Recording Arts and Sciences
- First award: 1995
- Final award: 2011
- Website: grammy.com

The Grammy Award for Best Pop Collaboration with Vocals was an honor presented at the Grammy Awards, a ceremony that was established in 1958 and originally called the Gramophone Awards, to recording artists for quality pop songs on which singers collaborate. Awards in several categories are distributed annually by the National Academy of Recording Arts and Sciences of the United States to "honor artistic achievement, technical proficiency and overall excellence in the recording industry, without regard to album sales or chart position."

The award for Best Pop Collaboration with Vocals was first presented to Al Green and Lyle Lovett at the 37th Grammy Awards (1995) for the song "Funny How Time Slips Away". According to the category description guide for the 52nd Grammy Awards, the award was presented to artists that performed "newly recorded collaborative pop performances" that "do not normally perform together."

In 1997, the father-daughter duo of Nat King Cole and Natalie Cole won the award for "When I Fall in Love", a "virtual duet" remake of one of his signature hits, using a recording of his vocals more than 30 years after his death in 1965.

There have been five instances in which an artist was nominated for more than one song in the same year, with different collaborators. In 1998, Barbra Streisand received nominations for the songs "I Finally Found Someone" (with Bryan Adams) and "Tell Him" (with Celine Dion). Santana was nominated in 2000 for the songs "Love of My Life" (with Dave Matthews) and "Smooth" (with Rob Thomas). In 2002, Christina Aguilera was nominated for the songs "Nobody Wants to Be Lonely" (Ricky Martin) and "Lady Marmalade" (with Lil' Kim, Mýa and Pink). In 2005, Ray Charles earned nominations for the songs "Sorry Seems to Be the Hardest Word" (with Elton John) and "Here We Go Again" (with Norah Jones). In 2010, Colbie Caillat was nominated for the songs "Breathe" (with Taylor Swift) and "Lucky" (with Jason Mraz). Four of the five won the award with one of their two nominations (Santana's "Smooth"; Aguilera's "Lady Marmalade"; Charles's "Here We Go Again"; and Caillat's "Lucky").

Two-time award recipients include Van Morrison, Pink, Santana, Alison Krauss, and Robert Plant. Krauss and Plant are the only duo to win more than once, as well as the only consecutive winners. Christina Aguilera and Stevie Wonder share the record for the most nominations, with six each.

The award was discontinued in 2012 in a major overhaul of Grammy categories. At that point, all duo or group performances in the pop category were shifted to the newly formed Best Pop Duo/Group Performance category. The 2011 award for a cover version of "Imagine" was the last one to be awarded in the Best Pop Collaboration with Vocals category.

== Recipients ==
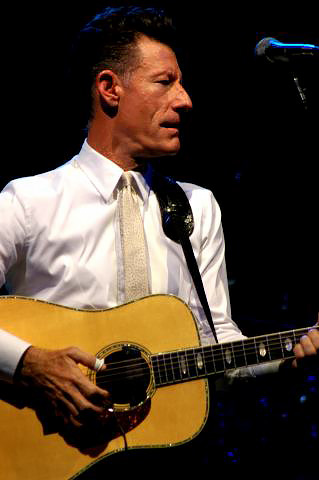
Lyle Lovett (pictured) and Al Green became the first award recipients in 1995 for the song "Funny How Time Slips Away".

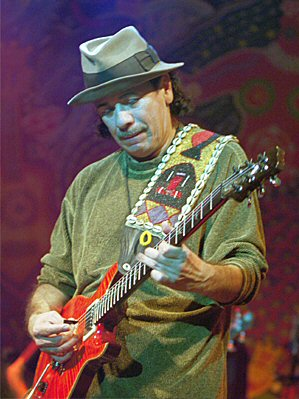
2000 and 2003 award winner Santana performing in 2000.

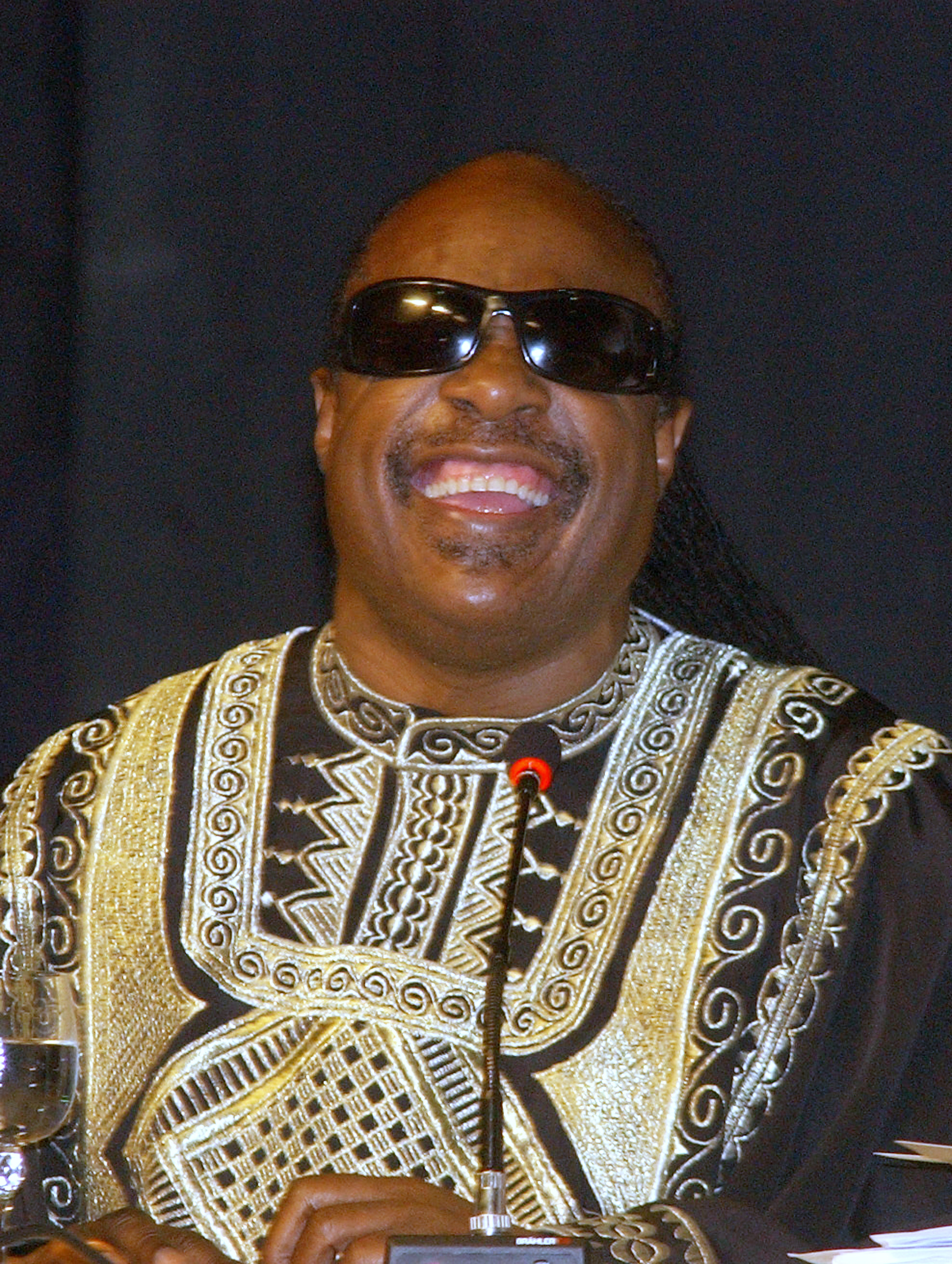
Six-time nominee Stevie Wonder in 2006

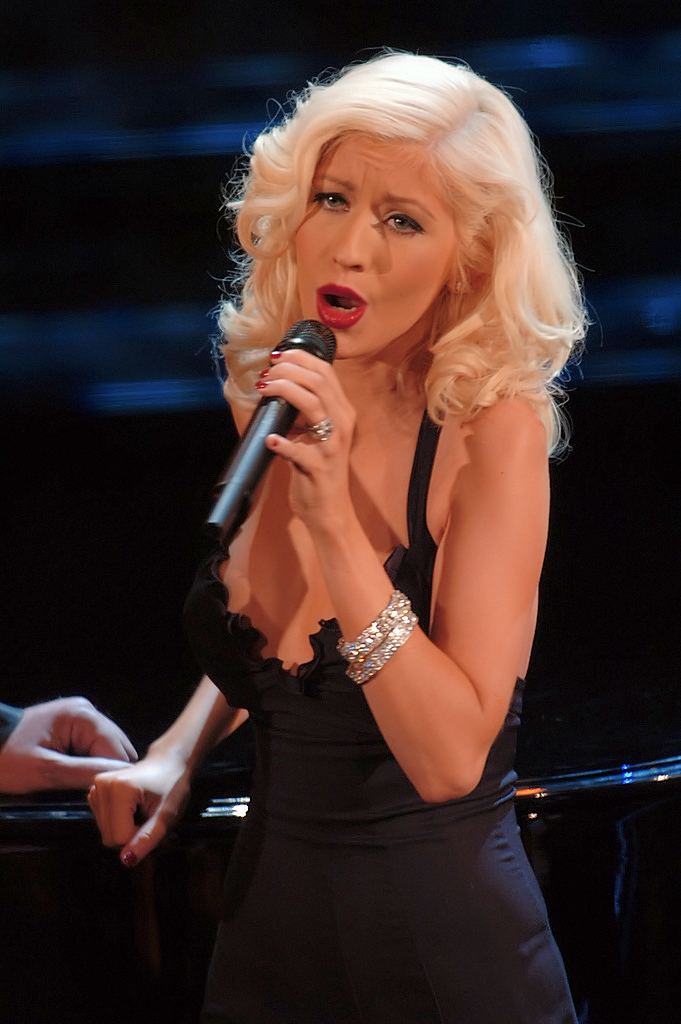
Six-time nominee and 2002 award winner Christina Aguilera

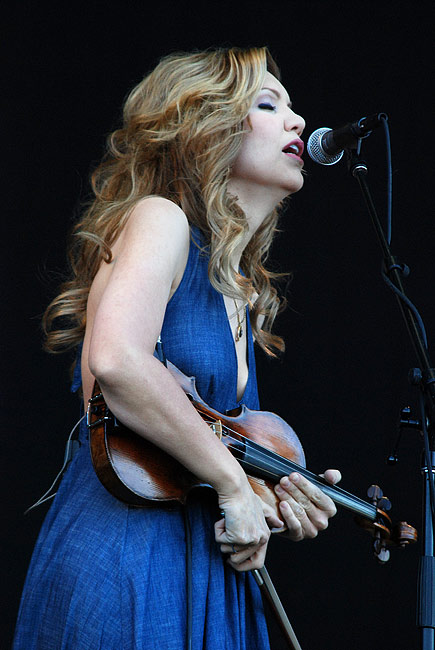
Two-time recipient Alison Krauss performing in 2008

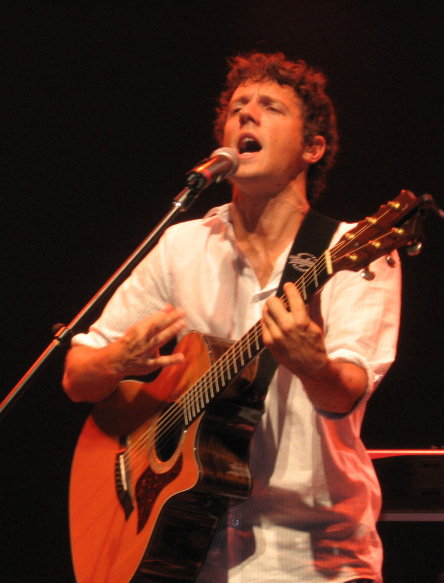
2010 award winner Jason Mraz performing in 2006

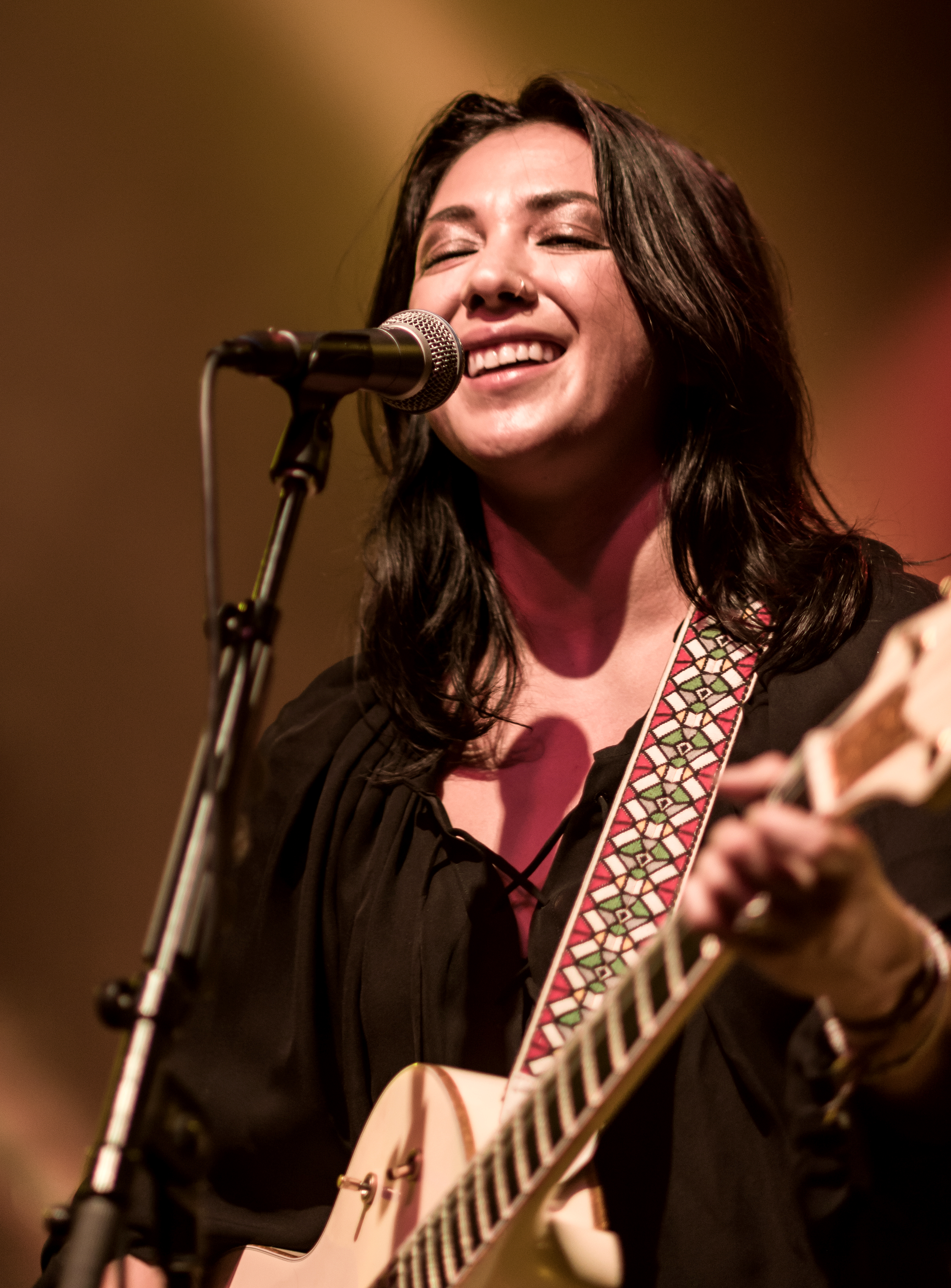
2003 award winner Michelle Branch performing in 2017

Year^{[I]}	Performing artists	Work	Nominees	Ref.
1995	Al Green and Lyle Lovett	"Funny How Time Slips Away"	Bryan Adams, Rod Stewart and Sting – "All for Love"; Tony Bennett and k.d. lang – "Moonglow" (Live); John Mellencamp and Me'shell Ndegeocello – "Wild Night"; Luther Vandross and Mariah Carey – "Endless Love"	
1996	The Chieftains and Van Morrison	"Have I Told You Lately"	Jon B. and Babyface – "Someone to Love"; Anita Baker and James Ingram – "When You Love Someone"; Mariah Carey and Boyz II Men – "One Sweet Day"; Michael Jackson and Janet Jackson – "Scream"	
1997	Natalie Cole and Nat King Cole	"When I Fall in Love"	Burt Bacharach and Elvis Costello – "God Give Me Strength"; Brandy, Tamia, Gladys Knight and Chaka Khan – "Missing You"; Whitney Houston and CeCe Winans – "Count On Me"; Sting, John McLaughlin, Dominic Miller and Vinnie Colaiuta – "The Wind Cries Mary"; Frank Sinatra and Luciano Pavarotti – "My Way"	
1998	John Lee Hooker and Van Morrison	"Don't Look Back"	Babyface and Stevie Wonder – "How Come, How Long"; Tony Bennett and Billie Holiday – "God Bless the Child"; Bryan Adams and Barbra Streisand – "I Finally Found Someone"; Barbra Streisand and Celine Dion – "Tell Him"	
1999	Elvis Costello and Burt Bacharach	"I Still Have That Other Girl"	Babyface and Stevie Wonder – "How Come, How Long" (Live); Jackson Browne and Bonnie Raitt – "Kisses Sweeter than Wine"; Celine Dion and R. Kelly – "I'm Your Angel"; Van Morrison and The Chieftains – "Shenandoah"	
2000	Santana and Rob Thomas	"Smooth"	Celine Dion and Andrea Bocelli – "The Prayer"; Whitney Houston and Mariah Carey – "When You Believe"; 'N Sync and Gloria Estefan – "Music of My Heart"; Santana and Dave Matthews – "Love of My Life"	
2001	B.B. King and Dr. John	"Is You Is, or Is You Ain't (My Baby)"	Mariah Carey, Joe and 98 Degrees – "Thank God I Found You"; Sheryl Crow and Sarah McLachlan – "The Difficult Kind" (Live); Celine Dion and Frank Sinatra – "All the Way"; Lauryn Hill and Bob Marley – "Turn Your Lights Down Low"	
2002	Christina Aguilera, Lil' Kim, Mýa and Pink	"Lady Marmalade"	Ricky Martin & Christina Aguilera – "Nobody Wants to Be Lonely"; Tony Bennett and Billy Joel – "New York State of Mind"; Brian McKnight and Justin Timberlake – "My Kind of Girl"; Shaggy and Rikrok – "It Wasn't Me"	
2003	Santana and Michelle Branch	"The Game of Love"	Christina Aguilera and Redman – "Dirrty"; India.Arie and Stevie Wonder – "The Christmas Song"; Tony Bennett and k.d. lang – "What a Wonderful World"; Sheryl Crow and Don Henley – "It's So Easy"; Natalie Cole and Diana Krall – "Better Than Anything"	
2004	Sting and Mary J. Blige	"Whenever I Say Your Name"	Christina Aguilera and Lil' Kim – "Can't Hold Us Down"; Tony Bennett and k.d. lang – "La Vie en rose"; Bob Dylan and Mavis Staples – "Gonna Change My Way of Thinking"; Pink and William Orbit – "Feel Good Time"	
2005	Ray Charles and Norah Jones	"Here We Go Again"	Johnny Cash and Joe Strummer – "Redemption Song"; Ray Charles and Elton John – "Sorry Seems to Be the Hardest Word"; Paul McCartney and Eric Clapton – "Something" (Live); Stevie Wonder and Take 6 – "Moon River"	
2006	Gorillaz and De La Soul	"Feel Good Inc."	The Black Eyed Peas and Jack Johnson – "Gone Going"; Foo Fighters and Norah Jones – "Virginia Moon"; Herbie Hancock and Christina Aguilera – "A Song for You"; Stevie Wonder and India.Arie – "A Time to Love"	
2007	Tony Bennett and Stevie Wonder	"For Once in My Life"	Mary J. Blige and U2 – "One"; Sheryl Crow and Sting – "Always on Your Side"; Nelly Furtado and Timbaland – "Promiscuous"; Shakira and Wyclef Jean – "Hips Don't Lie"	
2008	Robert Plant and Alison Krauss	"Gone Gone Gone (Done Moved On)"	Tony Bennett and Christina Aguilera – "Steppin' Out" (Live); Beyoncé and Shakira – "Beautiful Liar"; Gwen Stefani and Akon – "The Sweet Escape"; Timbaland, Nelly Furtado and Justin Timberlake – "Give It to Me"	
2009	Robert Plant and Alison Krauss	"Rich Woman"	Alicia Keys and John Mayer – "Lesson Learned"; Madonna, Justin Timberlake and Timbaland – "4 Minutes"; Maroon 5 and Rihanna – "If I Never See Your Face Again"; Jordin Sparks and Chris Brown – "No Air"	
2010	Jason Mraz and Colbie Caillat	"Lucky"	Rosanne Cash and Bruce Springsteen – "Sea of Heartbreak"; Ciara and Justin Timberlake – "Love Sex Magic"; Willie Nelson and Norah Jones – "Baby, It's Cold Outside"; Taylor Swift and Colbie Caillat – "Breathe"	
2011	Herbie Hancock, Pink, India.Arie, Seal, Konono Nº1, Jeff Beck and Oumou Sangaré	"Imagine"	B.o.B, Eminem and Hayley Williams – "Airplanes Part II"; Elton John and Leon Russell – "If It Wasn't for Bad"; Lady Gaga and Beyoncé – "Telephone"; Katy Perry and Snoop Dogg – "California Gurls"	

^{^[I]} Each year is linked to the article about the Grammy Awards held that year.

== See also ==
- Grammy Award for Best Pop Vocal Album
- List of Grammy Award categories
