= List of Top Country Albums number ones of 2009 =

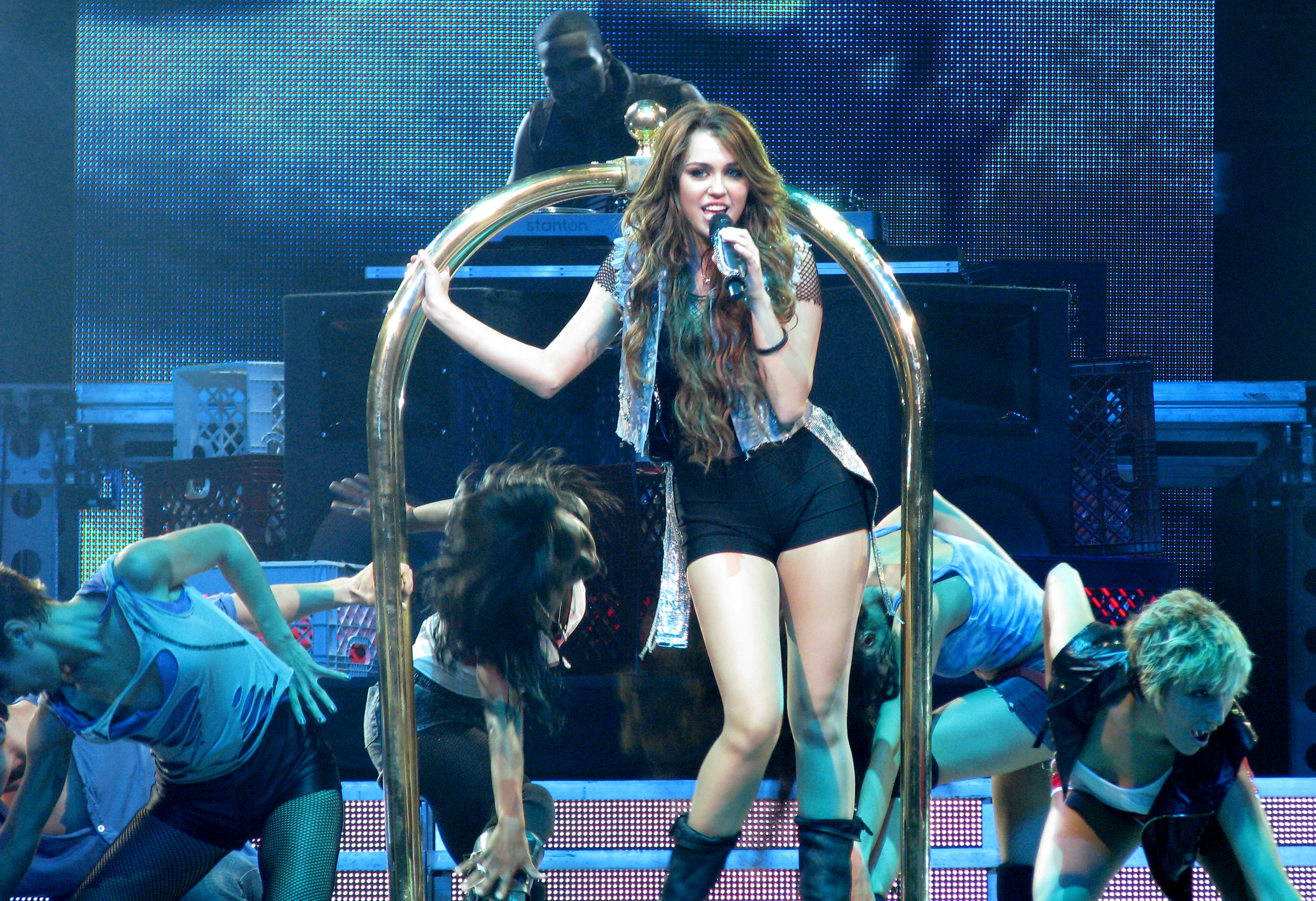
Miley Cyrus performed the majority of the songs on the soundtrack of Hannah Montana: The Movie, in which she also starred. The soundtrack album spent nine weeks at number one.

Top Country Albums is a chart that ranks the top-performing country music albums in the United States, published by Billboard. In 2009, 16 different albums topped the chart; placings were based on electronic point of sale data from retail outlets.

Unusually, the year began and ended with the same album at number one. In the issue of Billboard dated January 3, 19-year-old singer Taylor Swift's album Fearless spent its sixth week in the top spot. The album held the top spot for 13 of the first 14 weeks of 2009. Later in the year, the album experienced a resurgence in its chart performance, returning to number one in the issue dated August 1. It returned to the top spot periodically for the remainder of the year, and in the issue dated December 26 spent its 29th week atop the chart. The album also topped the all-genre Billboard 200 for 11 weeks, and won a number of awards, including the Grammy Awards for Album of the Year and Best Country Album. It was 2009's biggest-selling album in the U.S. and would eventually be certified diamond by the Recording Industry Association of America for shipping more than 10 million units.

After Fearless, the album which spent the most time at number one on the Top Country Albums chart in 2009 was the soundtrack album of the film Hannah Montana: The Movie, starring 16-year-old actress/singer Miley Cyrus, who performed most of the tracks. The album spent nine non-consecutive weeks atop the chart, interrupted for a single week by Kenny Chesney's Greatest Hits II. In contrast to teen stars Swift and Cyrus, George Strait topped the chart at the age of 57 with Twang. It was the 23rd number one for the singer, who had first reached the peak position with Right or Wrong more than 25 years earlier and achieved regular chart-toppers ever since. Strait's album was displaced from number one by Keep On Loving You by Reba McEntire, another veteran country star who had been achieving chart-toppers since the 1980s. It was the 11th number one for McEntire, breaking the record for the most chart-topping country albums by a female artist which she had previously shared with Loretta Lynn.

== Chart history ==
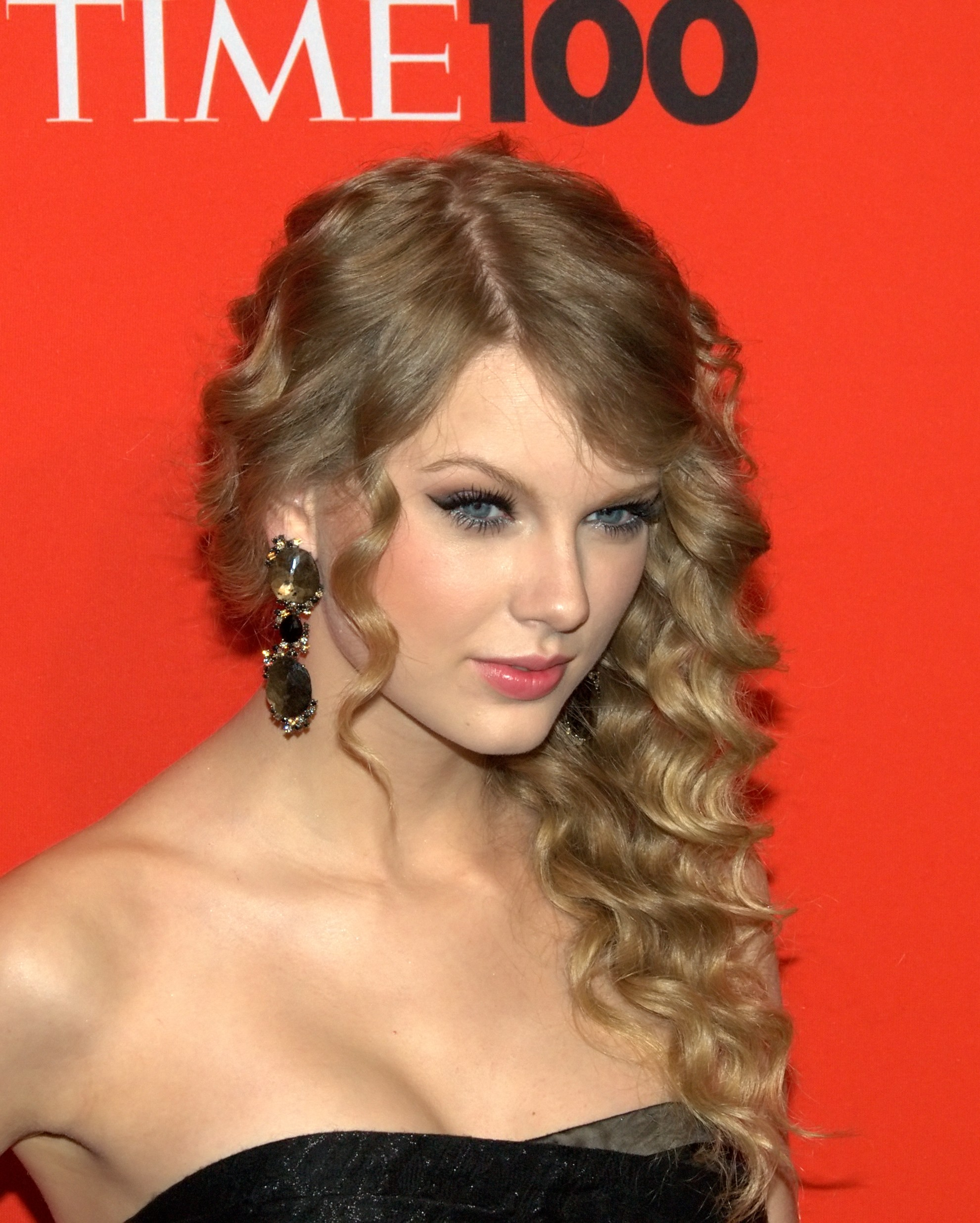
Taylor Swift's album Fearless both began and ended the year at number one, spending 24 weeks atop the chart, the year's longest chart topper.

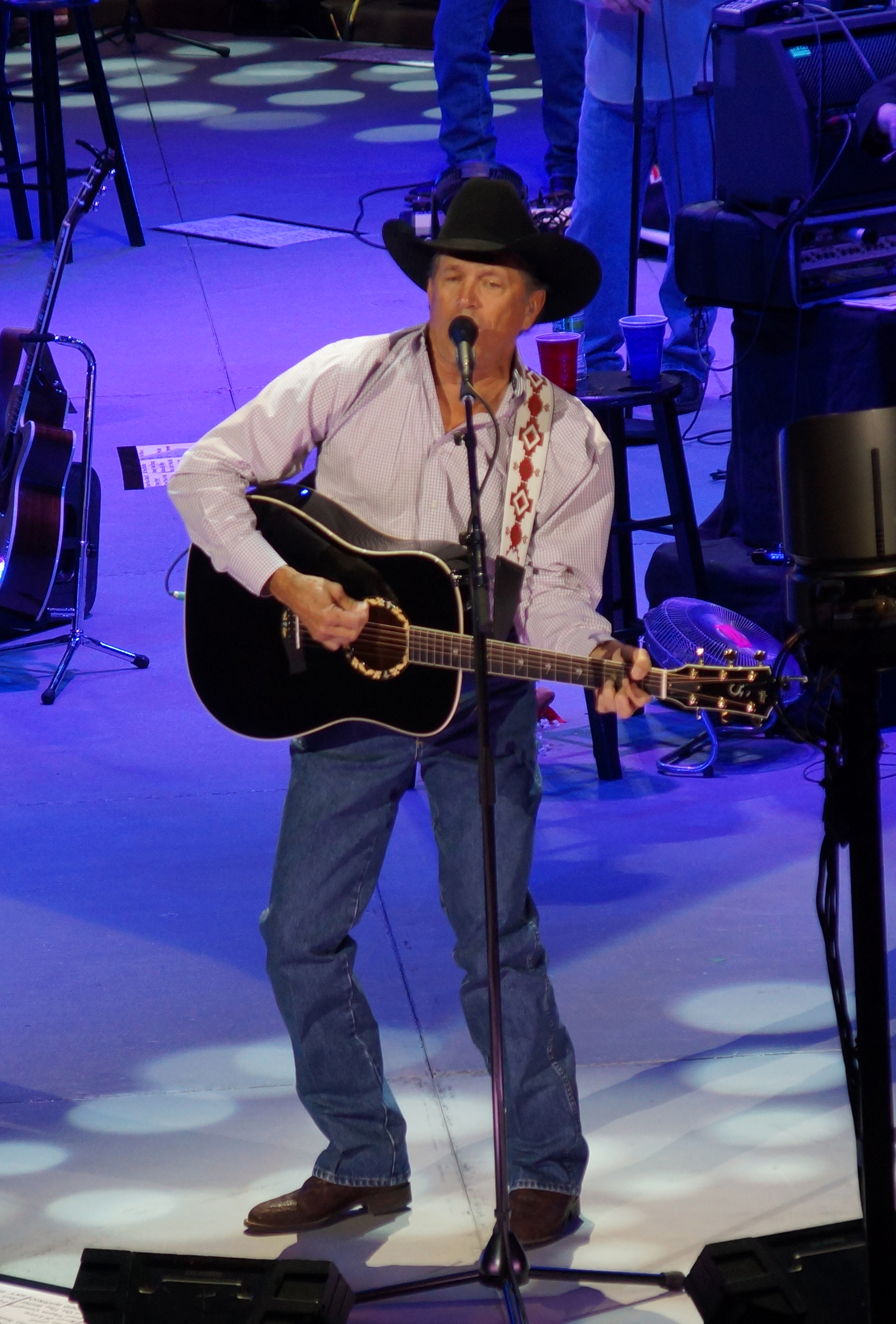
George Strait continued his run of number ones, more than 25 years after he first reached the top spot.

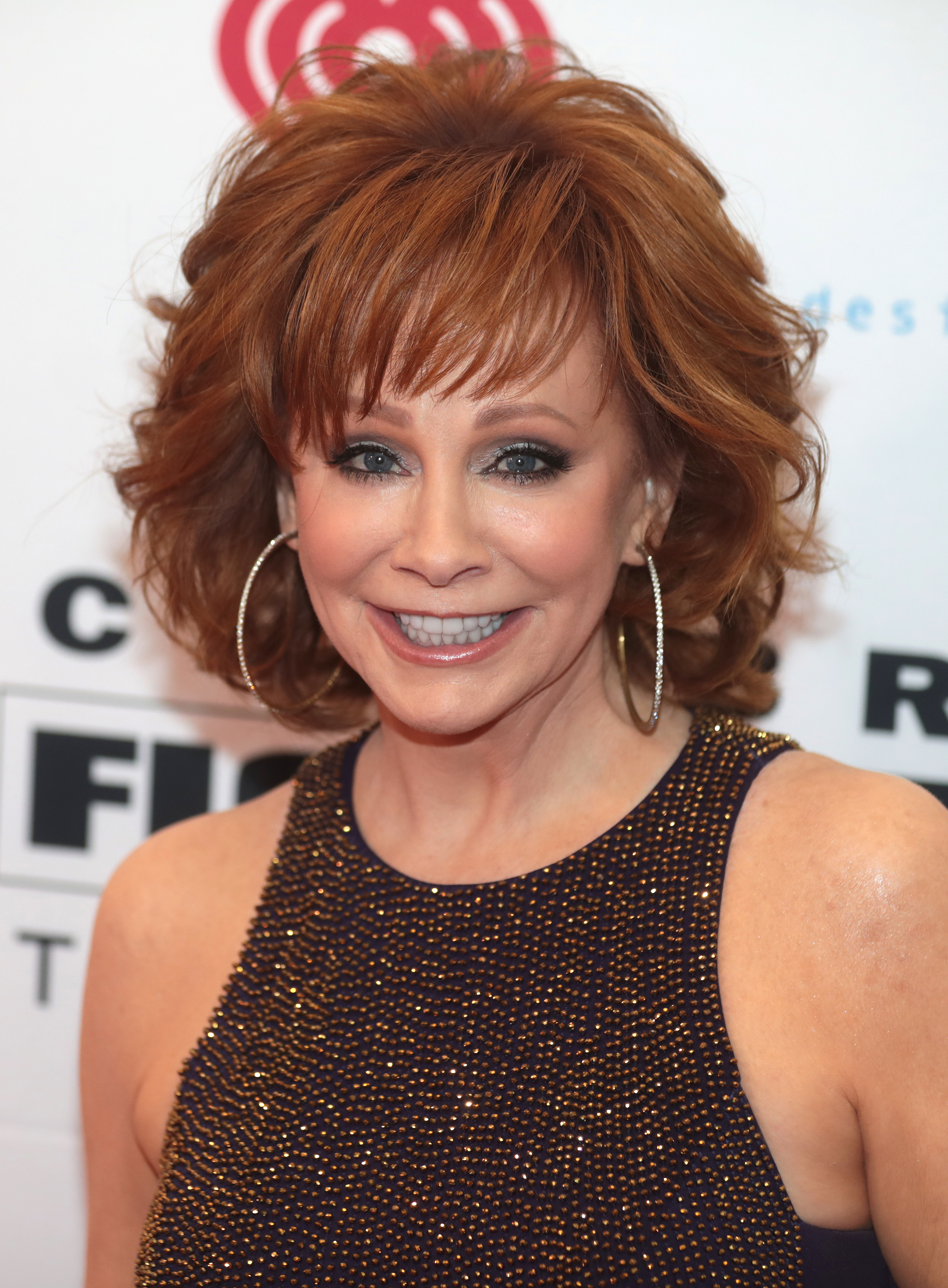
Reba McEntire set a new record in 2009 for the highest number of chart-topping albums by a female artist.

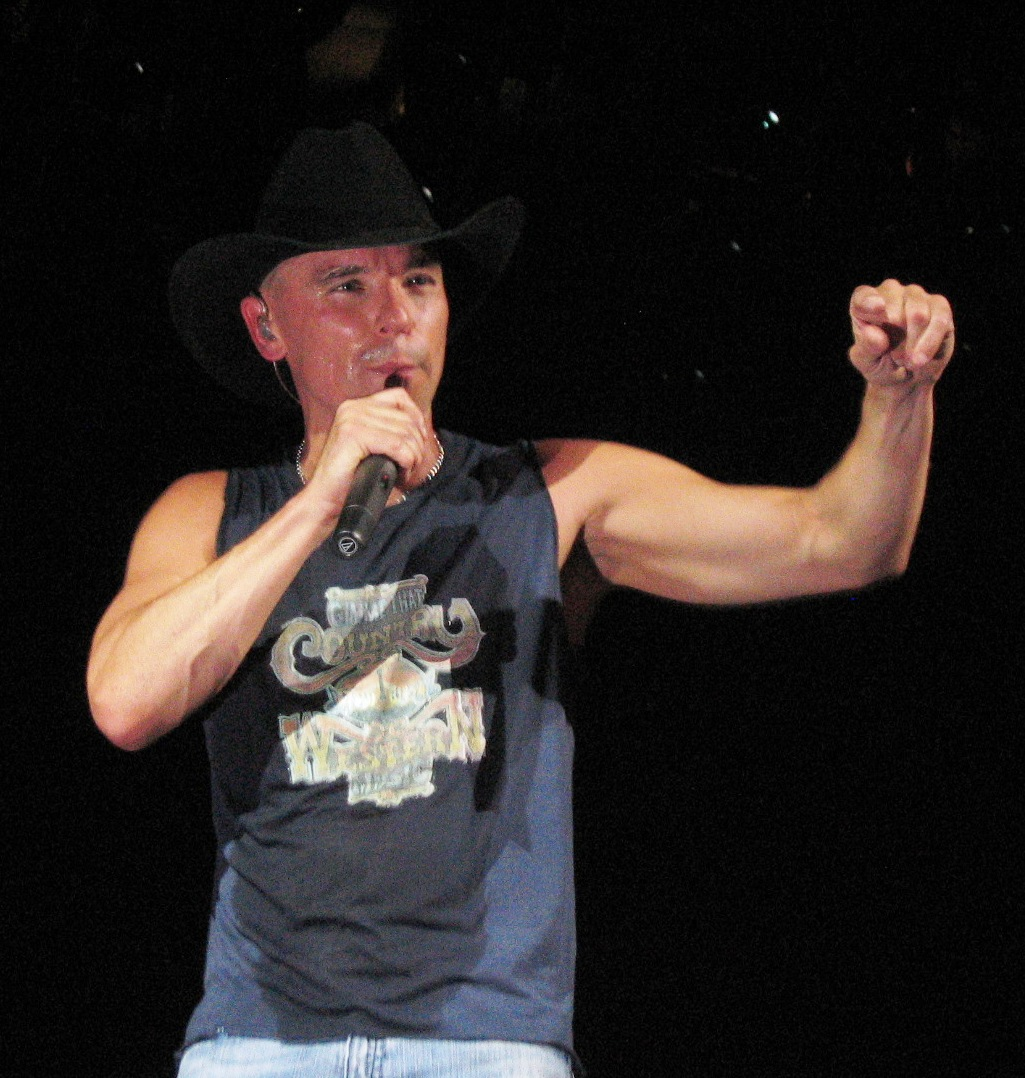
Kenny Chesney's Greatest Hits II interrupted the Hannah Montana soundtrack album's run at number one for a single week.

Issue date	Title	Artist(s)	Ref.
January 3	Fearless	Taylor Swift	
January 10	Fearless	Taylor Swift	
January 17	Fearless	Taylor Swift	
January 24	Fearless	Taylor Swift	
January 31	Fearless	Taylor Swift	
February 7	Fearless	Taylor Swift	
February 14	Fearless	Taylor Swift	
February 21	Feel That Fire	Dierks Bentley	
February 28	Fearless	Taylor Swift	
March 7	Fearless	Taylor Swift	
March 14	Fearless	Taylor Swift	
March 21	Fearless	Taylor Swift	
March 28	Fearless	Taylor Swift	
April 4	Fearless	Taylor Swift	
April 11	Shine	Martina McBride	
April 18	Defying Gravity	Keith Urban	
April 25	Unstoppable	Rascal Flatts	
May 2	Unstoppable	Rascal Flatts	
May 9	Hannah Montana: The Movie	Soundtrack	
May 16	Hannah Montana: The Movie	Soundtrack	
May 23	Hannah Montana: The Movie	Soundtrack	
May 30	Hannah Montana: The Movie	Soundtrack	
June 6	Greatest Hits II	Kenny Chesney	
June 13	Hannah Montana: The Movie	Soundtrack	
June 20	Hannah Montana: The Movie	Soundtrack	
June 27	Hannah Montana: The Movie	Soundtrack	
July 4	Hannah Montana: The Movie	Soundtrack	
July 11	Hannah Montana: The Movie	Soundtrack	
July 18	American Saturday Night	Brad Paisley	
July 25	American Saturday Night	Brad Paisley	
August 1	Fearless	Taylor Swift	
August 8	Fearless	Taylor Swift	
August 15	Fearless	Taylor Swift	
August 22	Live on the Inside	Sugarland	
August 29	Twang	George Strait	
September 5	Keep on Loving You	Reba McEntire	
September 12	Keep on Loving You	Reba McEntire	
September 19	Fearless	Taylor Swift	
September 26	#1's... and Then Some	Brooks & Dunn	
October 3	Fearless	Taylor Swift	
October 10	Fearless	Taylor Swift	
October 17	Revolution	Miranda Lambert	
October 24	American Ride	Toby Keith	
October 31	Fearless	Taylor Swift	
November 7	Southern Voice	Tim McGraw	
November 14	Fearless	Taylor Swift	
November 21	Play On	Carrie Underwood	
November 28	Play On	Carrie Underwood	
December 5	Play On	Carrie Underwood	
December 12	Fearless	Taylor Swift	
December 19	Fearless	Taylor Swift	
December 26	Fearless	Taylor Swift	
