= Breathe (Taylor Swift song) =

2008 song by Taylor Swift featuring Colbie Caillat

Promotional single by Taylor Swift featuring Colbie Caillat

from the album Fearless
- Released: October 21, 2008
- Studio: Blackbird; Starstruck (Nashville)
- Genre: Country pop; pop rock
- Length: 4:23
- Label: Big Machine
- Songwriters: Taylor Swift; Colbie Caillat
- Producers: Taylor Swift; Nathan Chapman

Audio video
- "Breathe" on YouTube

"Breathe (Taylor's Version)"

Song by Taylor Swift featuring Colbie Caillat

from the album Fearless (Taylor's Version)
- Released: April 9, 2021
- Studio: Blackbird (Nashville); Kitty Committee (London)
- Length: 4:20
- Label: Republic
- Songwriters: Taylor Swift; Colbie Caillat
- Producers: Taylor Swift; Christopher Rowe

Lyric video
- "Breathe (Taylor's Version)" on YouTube

"Breathe" is a song by Taylor Swift featuring Colbie Caillat from Swift's second studio album, Fearless (2008). Swift wrote the song with Caillat and produced it with Nathan Chapman. A country pop and pop rock ballad, "Breathe" incorporates strummed acoustic instruments and a string section. The lyrics are about heartbreak from losing a close friend. Big Machine Records released the track onto Rhapsody on October 21, 2008. Music critics found "Breathe" a sentimental song with resonant lyrics, but some deemed it insubstantial. The song was nominated for Best Pop Collaboration with Vocals at the 52nd Annual Grammy Awards in 2010, losing the award to Caillat's other contender, "Lucky" (with Jason Mraz).

"Breathe" peaked at number 87 on the US Billboard Hot 100 and was certified gold by the Recording Industry Association of America. Swift performed the song live on August 18, 2018, in Miami Gardens, Florida, for the Reputation Stadium Tour. After a 2019 dispute regarding the ownership of Swift's back catalog, she re-recorded "Breathe" with Caillat and released it as "Breathe (Taylor's Version)" as part of Fearless (Taylor's Version), the re-recording of Fearless, in 2021. "Breathe (Taylor's Version)" charted on the Canadian Hot 100 and the Billboard Global 200.

== Background and recording ==
Taylor Swift wrote songs for her second studio album, Fearless, while touring as an opening act for other country musicians to promote her self-titled debut studio album during 2007–2008, when she was 17–18 years old. Continuing the romantic themes of her first album, Swift wrote songs about love and personal experiences from the perspective of a teenage girl to ensure her fans could relate to Fearless. In her first role as producer, Swift and the producer Nathan Chapman recorded over 50 songs for Fearless, and "Breathe" was one of the 13 tracks that made the final cut.

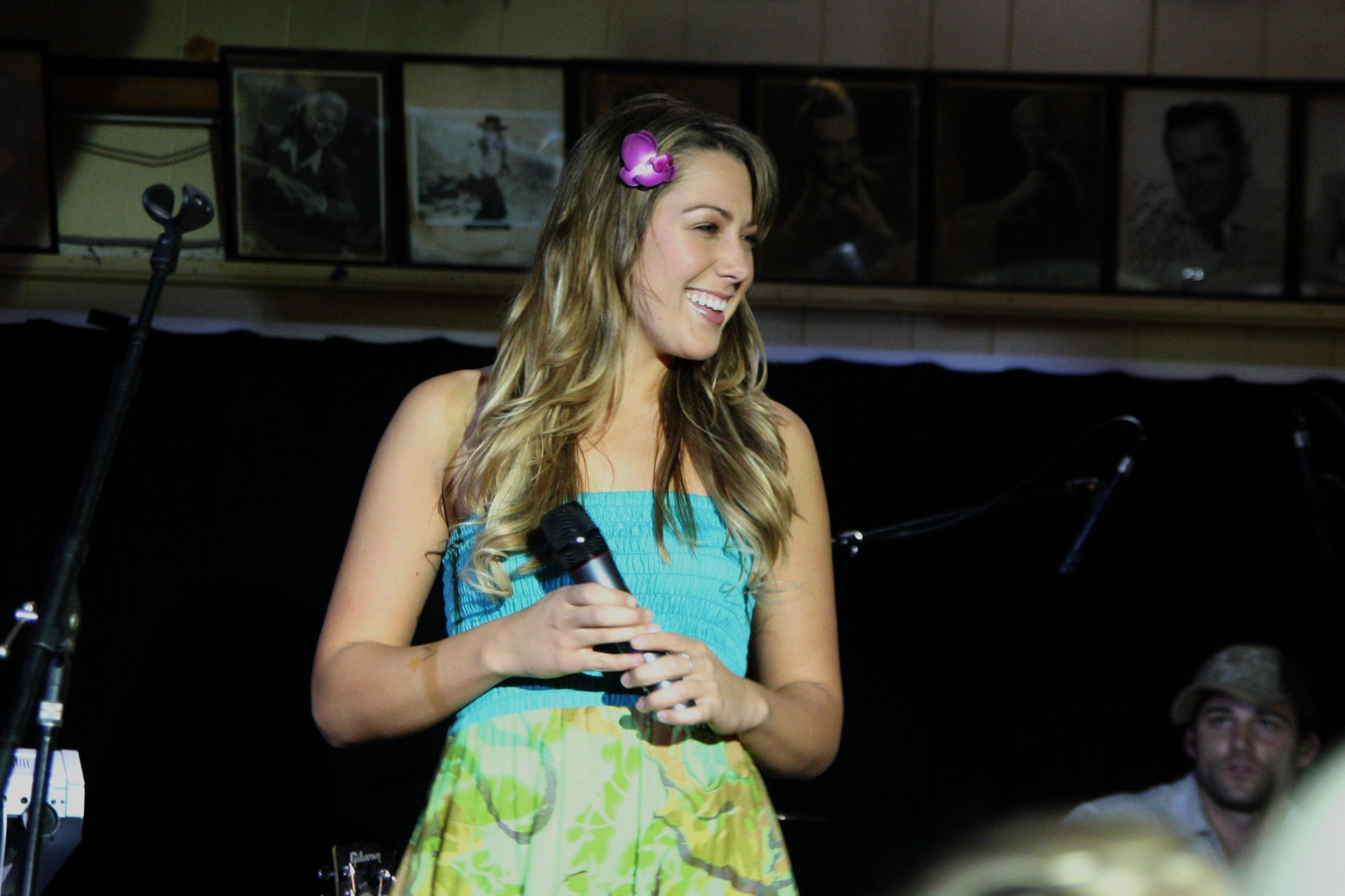
Colbie Caillat co-wrote and sang backing vocals on "Breathe".

While recording Fearless, Swift and Chapman used "Bubbly" (2007) by Colbie Caillat as a reference point. According to the mixer Justin Niebank, the two admired the simple arrangement and "the fact that on 'Bubbly' you could really sense that it was just an honest person sitting in a room surrounded by musicians". Swift asked her management to collaborate with Caillat, and the two artists wrote "Breathe" when Caillat had a day off from a promotional radio tour in Nashville, Tennessee. The two finished writing within 30 minutes in what Swift called a "back shed" behind her management company. Swift and Caillat recorded their vocals at Starstruck Studio and the engineer Chad Carlson recorded the track at Blackbird Studio, both in Nashville. Swift originally wanted Caillat to harmonize with her in the chorus, but the two ended up singing throughout the track because Swift was impressed with Caillat's vocals. According to Swift, "Breathe" was one of the first six tracks produced for Fearless by March 2008.

== Release ==
Big Machine Records released "Breathe" for download exclusively onto Rhapsody on October 21, 2008. Verizon Wireless used the song in a promotional campaign; it offered an exclusive ringtone of "Breathe" for contest winners. On the week ending November 29, 2008, "Breathe" debuted and peaked at number eighty-seven on the Billboard Hot 100, spending one week on the chart. Its appearance, along with six other songs, on the chart tied Swift with Hannah Montana (Miley Cyrus) for the female act to have the most songs charting on the Billboard Hot 100 in the same week. It was also one of six songs to debut that tied her with Cyrus, again, for the most debuts on the chart in the same week. In 2014, the song was certified gold by the Recording Industry Association of America (RIAA).

On the Miami Gardens, Florida, concert as part of her Reputation Stadium Tour on August 18, 2018, Swift performed "Breathe" as part of a "surprise song" for the mid-show acoustic session; she told the crowd that she was "99 percent sure" she had never performed the song live before. A re-recorded version of "Breathe", titled "Breathe (Taylor's Version)", was released on April 9, 2021 as the seventh track from Fearless (Taylor's Version), the re-recorded version of Fearless. Caillat returned as the song's feature.

== Music and lyrics ==
"Breathe" is 4 minutes and 23 seconds long. It is a country pop and pop rock ballad with elements of folk music. The track is driven by strummed acoustic instruments such as guitar and mandolin. It incorporates piano and violin accents which culminate in a full string section. Marissa R. Moss of Rolling Stone called the song a "country crossover moment". In the refrain, Caillat sings vocal harmonies.

The lyrics for "Breathe" are about heartbreak and the loss of a close friendship. In the song's verses, the narrator acknowledges that people change and grow apart, though she is upset because she knows the person "like the back of her hand." In the song's refrains, she realizes the need to remain strong and breathe in order to live without the person. Ken Tucker of Billboard believed "Breathe" was a "love-gone-wrong song."

According to Swift, "Breathe" is about having to depart from a someone, however, not blaming anyone. Swift believed the scenario was one of the most difficult goodbyes, "when it's nobody's fault. It just has to end." Swift explained, "It was total therapy because I came in and I was like look, 'One of my best friends, I'm gonna have to not see anymore and it's not gonna be part of what I do. It's the hardest thing to go through. It's crazy listening to the song because you would think it's about a relationship and it's really about losing a friend and having a fallout." Caillat and Swift said one of the beauties of the song was that many people would be able to relate to it because it is never specific as why the departure is occurring or whose fault it was. Caillat said in an interview that Swift "was writing about something she was going through with a band member at the time, and she was pouring her heart out about it."

== Critical reception ==
"Breathe" was generally well received by music critics. Ken Tucker of Billboard said the song was suited for women of different age groups. Gary Trust, also from Billboard, wrote in January 2010 that the track had a commercial success potential that "could keep Swift's string of smashes stretching into 2011". Bruce Mitchell of the Kelowna Capital News described the song as mature and lovely, and John Law of The Sudbury Star opined that the track, alongside "You're Not Sorry", "offers clues of the artist [Swift] may become" with "hooks that'll level the competition". Bernadette McNulty of The Daily Telegraph recommended "Breathe" for download in her review of Fearless. Jim Abbott of the Orlando Sentinel opined that the acoustic arrangement of the track was a "quieter" moment on the album that showed Swift's "most appealing side". Billboard's Taylor Weatherby considered the song Swift's seventh best feature. Weatherby complemented Swift's vocals, saying "she has a lovely voice that could practically sing you to sleep". He continued, describing Caillat's voice as "smooth". He concluded, "It may be the most soothing breakup song of all time."

In less enthusiastic reviews, Jonathan Keefe of Slant Magazine thought Swift should have chosen another collaborator as he believed Caillat was inert, while Larry Rodgers in The Arizona Republic wrote that the pop-rock arrangement sounded dull.

"Breathe" was one of two songs featuring Caillat that was nominated for the Grammy Award for Best Pop Collaboration with Vocals in 2010, the other being Jason Mraz's "Lucky", the winner of the award. About "Breathe" not winning the award, Caillat said, "I love 'Breathe' with Taylor, but I've been performing 'Lucky' with Jason all around the world the last year, so I'm happy it won."

== Credits and personnel ==
"Breathe"

- Taylor Swift – lead vocals, producer, songwriter
- Colbie Caillat – lead vocals, background vocals, harmony vocals, songwriter
- Nathan Chapman – producer, acoustic guitar
- Jonathan Yudkin – string arrangement, composition, performance
- Chad Carlson – recording
- Justin Niebank – mixing
- Drew Bollman – mixing assistant
- Hank Williams – mastering

"Breathe (Taylor's Version)"

- Christopher Rowe – vocals engineering, producer
- Taylor Swift – producer, lead vocals
- Lowell Reynolds – assistant engineer, additional engineer
- David Payne – recording engineer
- Derek Garten – additional engineer
- John Hanes – engineer
- Serban Ghenea – mixing
- Mike Meadows – acoustic guitar, mandolin, piano
- Paul Sidoti – acoustic guitar
- Amos Heller – bass guitar
- Matt Billingslea – electric guitar
- Jonathan Yudkin – strings
- Colbie Caillat – guest vocals

== Charts ==
=== "Breathe" ===
Chart (2008)	Peak position
US Billboard Hot 100	87

=== "Breathe (Taylor's Version)" ===
Chart performance for Taylor's version
Chart (2021)	Peak position
Canada Hot 100 (Billboard)	78
Global 200 (Billboard)	133
US Bubbling Under Hot 100 (Billboard)	8
US Hot Country Songs (Billboard)	34

== Certifications ==
Certifications
Region	Certification	Certified units/sales
Australia (ARIA)	Gold	35,000^{‡}
United States (RIAA)	Gold	500,000^{‡}
^{‡} Sales+streaming figures based on certification alone.
