= Luna Halo =

American rock band

- Origin: Nashville, Tennessee, U.S.
- Genres: Rock; Contemporary Christian music
- Years active: 1999–2012, 2015, 2022-present
- Labels: Spirit Music Group, Sparrow, American
- Past members: Nathan Barlowe; Cary Barlowe; Jonathan Smith; Victor Broden; Jonny MacIntosh; Brad Minor; Jonathan Smith; Mark Kruezer; Ben Showalter; Chris Coleman; Aaron Jenkins

Luna Halo is a Nashville-based rock band. The lead singer, Nathan Barlowe initially honed his skills with Reality Check, a modern rock Christian outfit, before forming Luna Halo in 1999.

== Musical career ==
In 2000, Luna Halo was fronted by former Reality Check front man Nathan Barlowe and released their debut CD Shimmer on Christian music label Sparrow Records. Even though Shimmer was praised by critics, Luna Halo left Sparrow Records and the Christian music industry before recording their next album due to creative differences.

Barlowe replaced guitarist MacIntosh with his younger brother Cary Barlowe, Aaron Jenkins replaced bassist Brad Minor, and drummer Chris Coleman replaced Jonathan Smith, completing the lineup for the new Luna Halo.

Rumors of an imminent major label deal began to surface in 2004, and a deal with DreamWorks, was announced prematurely, but later proved to be untrue, after negotiations broke down. The band released another EP, Wasting Away (originally recorded as a demo for DreamWorks) and opened shows for artists Velvet Revolver, Hoobastank, Collective Soul, Ours, Needtobreathe and Family Force 5.

In 2005, Luna Halo were signed to American Recordings and began work on their second album, Luna Halo. Originally scheduled for a Summer 2006 release, the album was plagued with delays. This was due to American Recordings owner Rick Rubin's departure from Warner Bros to Columbia Records. The album was finally released in late 2007.

On June 18, 2008, the band released a statement stating that drummer Chris Coleman was leaving the band to take a break from music and go back to school. In November, Jonathan Smith (the original Luna Halo drummer) rejoined the band.

In May 2008, the band shot a music video for the song "World On Fire", directed by Chris Grieder alongside Flying Dog Films.

On November 24, 2008, the band released a statement via MySpace stating that Aaron Jenkins would be leaving the band, because he was expecting the birth of his second child. On December 16, the band announced Victor Broden as their new bass player.

On November 13, 2012, lead singer Nathan Barlowe announced that Luna Halo would be playing their final show on December 8, 2012, at 12th and Porter in Nashville, TN. This show would mark not only the band's final show, but also their twelve-year anniversary celebration.

Their song 'I'm Alright' from their 2007 album was also featured inside Flatout: Ultimate Carnage as a part of the soundtrack.

After a seven-year hiatus, on February 11, 2022 Luna Halo performed a sold out show at the Mercury lounge in Nashville, Tennessee. They announced during their show that they only had two days to prepare for this concert.

Luna Halo signed a multi-album deal with Spirit Music Nashville/Fluid Music Revolution in June 2024 and is currently working on new material to be released in the Fall of 2024.

== Members ==
2002–2024

Band Members

- Nathan Barlowe – lead vocals, guitar
- Cary Barlowe – guitar, vocals
- Aaron Jenkins– bass
- Chris Coleman- drums

== Discography ==
- Shimmer (album) 2000, under Sparrow
- Luna Halo (EP) 2002
- New Drug (EP) 2003
- Wasting Away (EP) 2004
- Tour (EP) 2006, under American/Warner
- Luna Halo (EP) 2007
- Luna Halo (album) 2007, under American/Columbia
- Thank You... Goodnight' (mixtape) 2012
- The End is the Beginning (album) 2024, under Spirit/Fluid
