= So Fresh: The Hits of Summer 2010 + the Best of 2009 =

So Fresh: The Hits of Summer 2010 + The Best Of 2009

Compilation album by Various artists
- Released: 20 November 2009
- Genre: Pop
- Label: Sony Music

So Fresh chronology
So Fresh: The Hits of Spring 2009 (2009)	So Fresh: The Hits of Summer 2010 + The Best Of 2009 (2009)	So Fresh: The Hits of Autumn 2010 (2010)

So Fresh: The Hits of Summer 2010 & The Best of 2009 is a compilation of songs which were popular on the ARIA Charts of Australia in 2009, and hits in summer 2010. The album was released on 20 November 2009.

== Track listing ==
=== Disc 1 ===
1. Vanessa Amorosi – "This Is Who I Am" (3:26)
2. The Black Eyed Peas – "Meet Me Halfway" (3:46)
3. Britney Spears – "3" (3:25)
4. Taylor Swift – "Fifteen" (4:55)
5. Guy Sebastian featuring Jordin Sparks – "Art of Love" (4:00)
6. Kesha – "Tik Tok" (3:20)
7. La Roux – "Bulletproof" (3:27)
8. The All-American Rejects – "I Wanna" (3:29)
9. Powderfinger – "All of the Dreamers" (3:37)
10. Mika – "We Are Golden" (3:30)
11. A. R. Rahman and The Pussycat Dolls featuring Nicole Scherzinger – "Jai Ho! (You Are My Destiny)" (3:42)
12. Kelly Clarkson – "My Life Would Suck Without You" (3:33)
13. Gossip – "Love Long Distance" (4:26)
14. Kate Miller-Heidke – "Caught in the Crowd" (3:33)
15. Wale featuring Lady Gaga – "Chillin" (3:17)
16. Dizzee Rascal – "Holiday" (3:40)
17. Calvin Harris – "Ready for the Weekend" (3:37)
18. Jay Sean featuring Lil Wayne – "Down" (3:32)
19. Kevin Rudolf featuring Lil Wayne – "Let It Rock" (3:52)
20. Kid Cudi vs. Crookers – "Day 'n' Nite" (2:44)
21. Wolfmother – "New Moon Rising" (3:46)

=== Disc 2 ===
1. Pink – "I Don't Believe You" (4:36)
2. Jessica Mauboy – "Let Me Be Me" (3:49)
3. Mariah Carey – "Obsessed" (4:02)
4. Pixie Lott – "Boys and Girls" (3:03)
5. Beyoncé – "Single Ladies (Put a Ring on It)" (3:13)
6. Orianthi – "According to You" (3:20)
7. Bluejuice – "Broken Leg" (2:59)
8. Newton Faulkner – "If This Is It" (4:01)
9. The Fray – "You Found Me" (4:03)
10. Cassie Davis – "No More" (3:41)
11. Ciara featuring Justin Timberlake – "Love Sex Magic" (3:41)
12. Jordin Sparks – "S.O.S. (Let the Music Play)" (3:33)
13. The Script – "Before the Worst" (3:23)
14. Little Birdy – "Summarize" (3:19)
15. Akon featuring Colby O'Donis and Kardinal Offishall – "Beautiful" (5:13)
16. Shakira – "She Wolf" (3:08)
17. Rihanna – "Rehab" (4:55)
18. Sean Kingston – "Fire Burning" (4:02)
19. Backstreet Boys – "Straight Through My Heart" (3:27)
20. Damien Leith – "To Get to You" (3:35)
21. Wes Carr – "Feels Like Woah" (3:14)

== Charts ==
Chart (2009)	Peak position
Australian ARIA Compilations Chart	1

=== Year-end charts ===
Chart (2009)	Peak position
Australian ARIA Compilations Chart	1

== Certifications ==
Region	Certification	Certified units/sales
Australia (ARIA)	2× Platinum	140,000^{^}
^{^} Shipments figures based on certification alone.
