= You're Not Sorry =

2008 song by Taylor Swift

Promotional single by Taylor Swift

from the album Fearless
- Released: October 28, 2008
- Genre: Rock
- Length: 4:21
- Label: Big Machine
- Songwriter: Taylor Swift
- Producers: Taylor Swift; Nathan Chapman

Audio video
- "You're Not Sorry" on YouTube

"You're Not Sorry (Taylor's Version)"

Song by Taylor Swift

from the album Fearless (Taylor's Version)
- Released: April 9, 2021
- Studio: Black Bird; Prime Recording (Nashville)
- Length: 4:21
- Label: Republic
- Songwriter: Taylor Swift
- Producers: Taylor Swift; Christopher Rowe

Lyric video
- "You're Not Sorry (Taylor's Version)" on YouTube

"You're Not Sorry" is a song written and recorded by the American singer-songwriter Taylor Swift for her second studio album, Fearless (2008). In its lyrics, Swift's narrator calls out an ex-boyfriend for his betrayal. Produced by Swift and Nathan Chapman, "You're Not Sorry" is a rock power ballad with a sound that critics describe as mournful or dramatic: its verses are driven by piano and fiddle, while its refrains incorporate dynamic, crescendoing electric guitars.

To promote Fearless before its release, Big Machine Records made "You're Not Sorry" available for download via the iTunes Store on October 28, 2008. An electronic remix was released for the episode "Turn, Turn, Turn" of the TV series CSI: Crime Scene Investigation, in which Swift made a guest appearance. "You're Not Sorry" peaked at number 11 on both the Canadian Hot 100 and the US Billboard Hot 100, and it was certified platinum by the Recording Industry Association of America. Swift performed the track at the 44th Academy of Country Music Awards in 2009 and included it in the set lists of the Fearless Tour (2009–2010) and the Speak Now World Tour (2011–2012).

Critical reception of "You're Not Sorry" was mixed: reviews either praised the production as catchy or criticized it as overdone. Following the 2019 dispute regarding the ownership of Swift's back catalog, she re-recorded the song as "You're Not Sorry (Taylor's Version)" for her re-recorded album Fearless (Taylor's Version) (2021). Critics mostly praised Swift's vocals on the re-recorded version as having improved. "You're Not Sorry (Taylor's Version)" charted in Canada and on the Billboard Global 200.

== Background and writing ==
Taylor Swift wrote songs for her second studio album, Fearless, while touring as an opening act for other country musicians during 2007–2008, when she was 17–18 years old; she was promoting her first album, Taylor Swift (2006). Continuing the romantic themes of Taylor Swift, Fearless is about love and heartbreak from the perspective of a teenage girl, using autobiographical narratives embedded with high-school and fairy-tale imagery. According to Swift, this was a deliberate choice to ensure her fans could relate to her album, and nearly every track had a "face" that she associated with it. She and the producer Nathan Chapman recorded over 50 songs for Fearless, and "You're Not Sorry" was one of the 13 tracks that made the final cut.

Swift was inspired to write "You're Not Sorry" by an ex-boyfriend whom she realized was not being honest with her, and it took her a while to figure out his lies: "He came across as Prince Charming [...] who had a lot of secrets that he didn't tell me about." She recalled that the situation turned into a "breaking point" where she felt she had to walk away before allowing herself to get hurt further. Swift wrote "You're Not Sorry" alone and produced the track with Chapman. It was recorded by Chad Carlson and mixed by Justin Niebank, assisted by Steve Blackmon, at Blackbird Studio in Nashville.

== Release ==
Big Machine Records released "You're Not Sorry" for download exclusively via the iTunes Store on October 28, 2008, as part of the campaign "Countdown to Fearless". Fearless was released by Big Machine on November 11, 2008; "You're Not Sorry" is track number nine on the standard pressing. An electronic remix, made available for download via the iTunes Store on March 5, 2009, featured in the episode "Turn, Turn, Turn" of the television series CSI: Crime Scene Investigation, in which Swift made a guest appearance.

On the US Billboard Hot 100, "You're Not Sorry" debuted and peaked at number 11 in November 2008, and the CSI remix helped it re-enter at number 67 in March 2009, spending five weeks in total. It is one of the 13 Fearless tracks that charted within the top 40 of the Billboard Hot 100, breaking the record for the most top-40 entries from a single album. On the Pop 100 chart, the track peaked at number 21. The song was certified gold in 2009 and platinum in 2017 by the Recording Industry Association of America, and its US digital sales as of August 2012 stood at 697,000 copies. The track peaked at number 11 on the Canadian Hot 100.

Swift left Big Machine and signed a new contract with Republic Records in 2018. She began re-recording her first six studio albums that had been released under Big Machine in November 2020; this decision followed a 2019 dispute between Swift and the talent manager Scooter Braun, who acquired Big Machine Records and the masters of Swift's albums. Re-recording them would enable her to have full licensing rights of her songs for commercial use. The re-recording of "You're Not Sorry", titled "You're Not Sorry (Taylor's Version)", was released as part of the re-recorded album Fearless (Taylor's Version) on April 9, 2021, by Republic. Produced by Swift and Christopher Rowe, "You're Not Sorry (Taylor's Version)" peaked at number 165 on the Billboard Global 200 and number 90 on the Canadian Hot 100. In the United States, it peaked at number 11 on the Bubbling Under Hot 100 chart and number 40 on the Hot Country Songs chart.

== Music and lyrics ==
"You're Not Sorry"
"You're Not Sorry" is a rock power ballad instrumented by piano, cello, and electric guitar.

At 4 minutes and 21 seconds long, "You're Not Sorry" is a rock power ballad with elements of country and hard rock. Composed in the key of E-flat minor, the track features piano and cello that constitute its verses, and its refrains are instrumented by loud, dynamic electric guitars, and heavy drums accentuated by a tambourine on each snare beat. Critics described the soundscape as somber, solemn, and dramatic. Electric guitars are prominent: in the instrumental part that precedes the second verse, they are played in double stop on the tonic and the upper third; in the solo, they are played in arpeggios on the upper part of the neck. The critic Annie Zaleski characterized the song as a "thundering ballad" and attributed this quality to what she described as melodramatic piano, mournful fiddle, and crescendoing electric guitars. Jordan Levin of the Miami Herald deemed it a "rebellious" tune, and Jonathan Keefe of Slant Magazine wrote that the refrains feature prominent pop hooks.

Swift sings with dramatic vocals that span over two octaves; according to Erin Strecker of Billboard, Swift's voice conveys pain and "lets loose" singing lyrics such as, "Looking so innocent I might believe you if I didn't know/ Could have loved you all my life if you hadn't left me waiting in the cold." Scott Mervis of the Pittsburgh Post-Gazette described her delivery as "chanteuse a la Tori Amos". The re-recording, "You're Not Sorry (Taylor's Version)", features an identical arrangement as the original, but some critics commented that its production features Swift's richer and deeper vocals; according to the commercial music professor Michael A. Lee, her voice is less nasal and comes more from the chest, the background vocals are more subdued, and the strings are recorded in a closer proximity to the microphones.

Swift grouped "You're Not Sorry" among the breakup songs on Fearless, alongside "White Horse" and "Forever & Always". According to her, "You're Not Sorry" expresses dissatisfaction at a romantic failing from an angry perspective. The song's narrator resents the fact that her ex-boyfriend betrayed her trust, and it took her a while to realize that his apologies are insincere and that he will never change. This ex-boyfriend does not take accountability for his mistakes, so the narrator ends the relationship for her own good. Kelsey Barnes of Gigwise dubbed "You're Not Sorry" the antithesis to Fearless's lead single "Love Story". She regarded "You're Not Sorry" and "White Horse" as "two sides of a same coin"; the former sees Swift blaming her blind optimism, while the latter sees her blaming the ex-boyfriend.

Some reviews highlighted "You're Not Sorry" as a counterpart to the fairy tale–inspired optimistic love songs that make up the majority of Fearless. Rob Sheffield, writing for Blender, thought that the lyrics contained "tingling pheromones". MTV's Kyle Anderson remarked that the lyricism was "surprisingly heavy" and the slow-burning arrangement made the emotional tension more palpable. Ash Amanda of the Edmonton Journal contended that "You're Not Sorry" retained the "feminine passion" of Swift's first album, but it represented a more contemplative and reflective tone that replaced the vengeful attitude of tracks like "Picture to Burn" or "Should've Said No". She described "You're Not Sorry" as a "silent [reprisal] over fairy-tale boyfriends who don't live up to their knighthood".

== Critical reception ==
Music critics gave "You're Not Sorry" mixed reviews. Sheffield labeled the track "drippy" and opined that it was not as effective as other upbeat Fearless tracks. Retrospective reviews from Hannah Mylrea of NME (2020) and Nate Jones of Vulture (2024) called the song overdone and unflinching. The musicologist James E. Perone found the lyrics empowering for females, but he found the message repetitive given the track's placement on the album, because it reprises the themes of the preceding tracks like "White Horse" and "Tell Me Why".

Positive reviews that complimented the production were from Keefe, who highlighted the prominent pop hooks, and The Sudbury Star's John Law, who praised the "big-league" sound that would suggest new musical directions for Swift's artistry and "level the competition". Nick Catucci of New York said that he could come up with better songs in the last ten years, but he admitted that "this bittersweet bit of pop fluff succeeds splendidly" and remarked that Swift operated "on her own terms". Some reviews were fond of Swift's singing. Brittany Spanos of Rolling Stone wrote about how her voice "pierces through the sound of her band for one of her first truly dramatic vocal deliveries", and Thomas Kitner of the Hartford Courant regarded the track as a "smart balance" between teenage naivete and matured craftsmanship, in part thanks to Swift's "breathy and simple" vocals. Strecker in 2014 selected "You're Not Sorry" as one of Swift's 10 "most underrated" songs.

Reviews of "You're Not Sorry (Taylor's Version)" generally acclaimed Swift's vocals as having improved. Joe Coscarelli from The New York Times said he had admired Swift's songwriting but felt the original production "[plods] a little", and the "fresh and refined" re-recording made him more appreciative of the track. Rhian Daly of The Forty-Five selected it as one of Swift's most underrated songs, saying that the "rockier" sound and the "Nashville twang" suggested the diverse musical experimentations that contributed to her later works.

== Live performances ==
Swift performed "You're Not Sorry" live for the first time at the 44th Academy of Country Music Awards on April 5, 2009. She entered the stage with a magic trick by David Copperfield that made her appear in a seemingly empty cage suspended in the air. Swift then played a piano to sing "You're Not Sorry" and towards its conclusion, she was supported by a string section. The biographer Liv Spencer considered the Copperfield introduction one of Swift's most memorable awards-show moments. Todd Martens of the Los Angeles Times considered it unnecessary and criticized her vocals as weak. Swift later performed the song at the 2009 CMA Music Festival in on June 14.

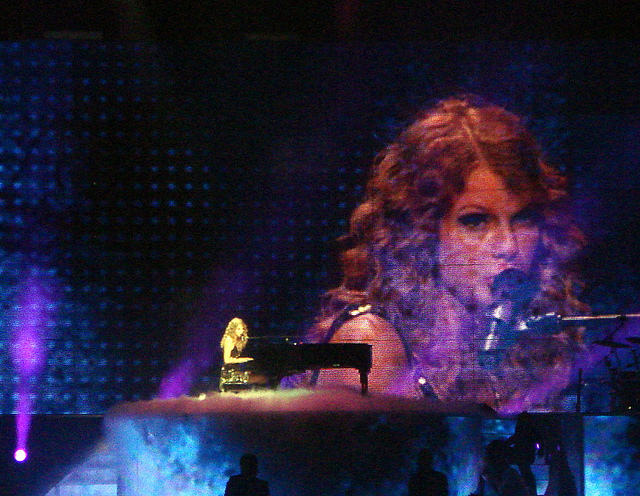
Swift performing "You're Not Sorry" on the Fearless Tour in 2010

The song was part of the regular set list for Swift's first headlining concert tour, the Fearless Tour (2009–2010). During each performance, Swift donned a black cocktail dress with sparkly ornaments along the stomach. She began by singing "You're Not Sorry" while playing a black baby grand piano and then covered snippets of Justin Timberlake's 2006 single "What Goes Around... Comes Around" while whipping her hair. Towards the number's conclusion, Swift intermingled between the two songs as stage lights flashed, smoke swirled, and backup dancers performed hip-hop acrobatics. Jon Pareles of The New York Times deemed this performance a highlight of the show, but Reed Fischer of Miami New Times regarded it as one of "the only unsavory moments". Alice Fisher of The Observer found Swift's theatrics and acting unconvincing, although she found her piano performance "fantastic".

For the set list of the Speak Now World Tour (2011–2012), Swift included "You're Not Sorry" as part of a mashup with her 2010 single "Back to December" and OneRepublic's 2007 single "Apologize". The performance began with snowy stage graphics and tuxedo–wearing dancers performing a choreography on a bridge that was lowered onto the stage. Dressed in a long gown, Swift sang the mashup while playing a baby grand piano, backed by nine violinists. Swift occasionally performed "You're Not Sorry" on her later tours. On the Red Tour, she sang the track during the show in Tacoma, Washington, in March 2013. On the Eras Tour, she performed "You're Not Sorry" on piano during the show in Houston, Texas, on April 21, 2023, and as part of a guitar mashup with her 2006 song "Should've Said No" during the show in Sydney, Australia, on February 23, 2024.

== Personnel ==
"You're Not Sorry" (2008)

- Taylor Swift – producer
- Nathan Chapman – producer
- Chad Carlson – recording
- Justin Niebank – mixing
- Steve Blackmon – assistant mixing

"You're Not Sorry (Taylor's Version)" (2021)

- Taylor Swift – lead vocals, producer
- Lowell Reynolds – assistant recording engineer, additional engineer
- David Payne – recording
- Christopher Rowe – producer, lead vocals recording
- Derek Garten – additional engineer
- John Hanes – engineer
- Serban Ghenea – mixing
- Amos Heller – bass
- Matt Billingslea – drums
- Max Bernstein – electric guitar
- Mike Meadows – electric guitar, background vocals
- Paul Sidoti – piano
- Jonathan Yudkin – strings

== Charts ==
=== "You're Not Sorry" ===
Chart performance
Chart (2008–2009)	Peak position
Canada Hot 100 (Billboard)	11
US Billboard Hot 100	11
US Billboard Pop 100	21

=== "You're Not Sorry (Taylor's Version)" ===
Chart performance for Taylor's version
Chart (2021)	Peak position
Canada (Canadian Hot 100)	90
Global 200 (Billboard)	165
US Bubbling Under Hot 100 (Billboard)	11
US Hot Country Songs (Billboard)	40

== Certification ==
Certification
Region	Certification	Certified units/sales
United States (RIAA)	Platinum	1,000,000^{‡}
^{‡} Sales+streaming figures based on certification alone.
