= So Fresh: The Hits of Spring 2009 =

Compilation album by Various artists
- Released: 11 September 2009
- Recorded: 2009
- Genre: Pop
- Label: Sony Music

So Fresh chronology
| So Fresh: The Hits of Winter 2009 (2009) | So Fresh: The Hits of Spring 2009 (2009) | So Fresh: The Hits of Summer 2010 + the Best of 2009 (2009) |

So Fresh - The Hits of Spring 2009 is a compilation of hit songs in Australia from Spring 2009. The album was released on 11 September 2009.

== Track listing ==
=== CD ===
1. The Black Eyed Peas – "I Gotta Feeling" (4:50)
2. Kate Miller-Heidke – "The Last Day on Earth" (4:47)
3. Guy Sebastian – "Like It Like That" (3:50)
4. Lady Gaga – "Paparazzi" (3:29)
5. Jordin Sparks – "Battlefield" (4:01)
6. Gossip – "Heavy Cross" (4:04)
7. Taylor Swift – "You Belong with Me" (3:52)
8. Pink – "Funhouse" (3:25)
9. Kelly Clarkson – "Already Gone" (4:41)
10. Short Stack – "Sway, Sway Baby!" (2:51)
11. The Pussycat Dolls – "Hush Hush; Hush Hush" (4:12)
12. Cascada – "Evacuate the Dancefloor" (3:26)
13. Dizzee Rascal and Armand Van Helden – "Bonkers" (2:57)
14. Pitbull – "I Know You Want Me (Calle Ocho)" (3:04)
15. La Roux – "In for the Kill" (4:09)
16. Paloma Faith – "Stone Cold Sober" (2:55)
17. Jessica Mauboy – "Up/Down" (3:26)
18. Calvin Harris – "I'm Not Alone" (3:31)
19. Cassie Davis – "Do It Again" (2:52)
20. Tommy Trash – "Need Me to Stay" (3:38)

=== DVD ===
1. The Black Eyed Peas – "I Gotta Feeling"
2. Lady Gaga – "Paparazzi"
3. Jordin Sparks – "Battlefield"
4. Gossip – "Heavy Cross"
5. Taylor Swift – "You Belong with Me"
6. Guy Sebastian – "Like It Like That"
7. Kate Miller-Heidke – "The Last Day on Earth"
8. Pink – "Funhouse"
9. Kelly Clarkson – "Already Gone"
10. Short Stack – "Sway, Sway Baby!"
11. The Pussycat Dolls – "Hush Hush; Hush Hush"
12. Cascada – "Evacuate the Dancefloor"

== Charts ==
=== Year-end charts ===
| Chart (2009) | Peak position |
|---|---|
| Australian ARIA Compilations Chart | 3 |

== Certifications ==
| Region | Certification | Certified units/sales |
|---|---|---|
| Australia (ARIA) | 2× Platinum | 140,000^{^} |
^{^} Shipments figures based on certification alone.
