= So Fresh: The Hits of Autumn 2009 =

Compilation album by Various artists
- Released: 27 March 2009
- Genre: Pop
- Label: Sony BMG

So Fresh chronology
So Fresh: The Hits of Summer 2009 (2008)	So Fresh: The Hits of Autumn 2009 (2009)	So Fresh: The Hits of Winter 2009 (2009)

So Fresh: The Hits of Autumn 2009 is a compilation album of songs that were popular on the ARIA Charts of Australia in Autumn 2009. It also features a DVD containing the latest music videos. The album was released on 27 March 2009.

== Track listing ==
=== Disc 1 ===
1. Taylor Swift – "Love Story" (3:56)
2. Kelly Clarkson – "My Life Would Suck Without You" (3:33)
3. The Fray – "You Found Me" (4:03)
4. Jessica Mauboy – "Burn" (2:53)
5. The All-American Rejects – "Gives You Hell" (3:32)
6. Pink – "Please Don't Leave Me" (3:53)
7. Cassie Davis – "Like It Loud" (3:06)
8. Lady Gaga – "Eh, Eh (Nothing Else I Can Say)" (2:56)
9. Wes Carr – "Feels Like Woah" (3:14)
10. The Pussycat Dolls featuring Snoop Dogg – "Bottle Pop" (3:31)
11. The Ian Carey Project – "Get Shaky" (3:26)
12. Britney Spears – "Circus" (3:11)
13. Natalie Bassingthwaighte – "Someday Soon" (4:13)
14. Global Deejays featuring Rozalla – "Everybody's Free" (Klaas Radio Edit) (3:15)
15. Kevin Rudolf featuring Lil Wayne – "Let It Rock" (3:53)
16. Akon – "Right Now (Na Na Na)" (4:04)
17. Fall Out Boy – "America's Suitehearts" (3:42)
18. The Living End – "Raise the Alarm" (3:38)
19. Metro Station – "Seventeen Forever" (2:54)
20. Secondhand Serenade – "Your Call" (3:55)

=== Disc 2 (DVD) ===
1. Taylor Swift – "Love Story"
2. Kelly Clarkson – "My Life Would Suck Without You"
3. The Fray – "You Found Me"
4. Jessica Mauboy – "Burn"
5. The All-American Rejects – "Gives You Hell"
6. Pink – " Please Don't Leave Me"
7. Cassie Davis – "Like It Loud"
8. The Pussycat Dolls – "Bottle Pop"
9. The Ian Carey Project – "Get Shaky"
10. Britney Spears – "Circus"
11. Kevin Rudolf featuring Lil Wayne – "Let It Rock"
12. Akon – " Right Now (Na Na Na)"

== Certifications ==
Region	Certification	Certified units/sales
Australia (ARIA)	Gold	35,000^{^}
^{^} Shipments figures based on certification alone.
