= White Horse (Taylor Swift song) =

2008 single by Taylor Swift

Single by Taylor Swift

from the album Fearless
- Released: December 8, 2008
- Genre: Country pop
- Length: 3:54
- Label: Big Machine
- Songwriters: Taylor Swift; Liz Rose
- Producers: Taylor Swift; Nathan Chapman

Taylor Swift singles chronology
"Love Story" (2008)	"White Horse" (2008)	"You Belong with Me" (2009)

Music video
- "White Horse" on YouTube

"White Horse (Taylor's Version)"

Song by Taylor Swift

from the album Fearless (Taylor's Version)
- Released: April 9, 2021
- Studio: Black Bird; Prime Recording; (Nashville)
- Length: 3:54
- Label: Republic
- Songwriters: Taylor Swift; Liz Rose
- Producers: Taylor Swift; Christopher Rowe

Lyric video
- "White Horse (Taylor's Version)" on YouTube

"White Horse" is a song by the American singer-songwriter Taylor Swift and the second single from her second studio album, Fearless (2008). Big Machine Records released the track to US country radio on December 8, 2008. Swift wrote "White Horse" with Liz Rose and produced it with Nathan Chapman. An understated country pop ballad, the song is driven by a finger-picked guitar and includes piano and cello accents. The lyrics incorporate fairy-tale imagery of princesses and white horses: the narrator is heartbroken upon realizing that her boyfriend is not an ideal figure like she thought, and in the end she leaves her town with hopes of finding somebody more worthy.

Music critics lauded "White Horse" for what they deemed a somber production and a portrayal of universal feelings arising from heartbreak, but some found the lyrics uncreative. At the 2010 Grammy Awards, the track won Best Country Song and Best Female Country Vocal Performance. In the United States, the single peaked at number 13 on the Billboard Hot 100 and number two on the Hot Country Songs chart, and the Recording Industry Association of America (RIAA) certified it double platinum. The song also charted in Australia, Canada, and the United Kingdom; it received certifications in the first two countries.

Trey Fanjoy directed the song's music video, which depicts Swift reliving memories with her ex-boyfriend and her discovery of his infidelity after having ended their relationship through a phone call. The video premiered on February 7, 2009, on CMT, and it became the first video to debut at number one on the network's countdown. Swift performed "White Horse" live at the 2008 American Music Awards, on her Fearless Tour (2009–2010), and on certain dates of her later tours. Following the 2019 dispute regarding the ownership of Swift's back catalog, she re-recorded the song as "White Horse (Taylor's Version)" for her 2021 re-recorded album Fearless (Taylor's Version).

== Background and writing ==
Taylor Swift wrote songs for her second studio album, Fearless, while touring as an opening act for other country musicians to promote her first album Taylor Swift during 2007–2008, when she was 17–18 years old. Continuing the romantic themes of her first album, Swift wrote songs about love and personal experiences from the perspective of a teenage girl to ensure her fans could relate to Fearless. She said that nearly every album track had a "face" that she associated with it. The end product is a collection of songs about the challenges of love with prominent high-school and fairy-tale lyrical imagery. Swift and the producer Nathan Chapman recorded more than 50 songs for Fearless, and "White Horse" was one of the 13 tracks that made the final cut. Recorded by the engineer Chad Carlson, "White Horse" was produced by Swift and Chapman. Justin Niebank, assisted by Steve Blackmon, mixed it at Blackbird Studio in Nashville.

According to a note published in the liner notes of Swift's 2019 album Lover, part of the lyrics to "White Horse" dated from December 2006. She wrote the first verse by herself, and Liz Rose helped her complete the song in 45 minutes. Swift completed writing "White Horse" weeks after she finished the lead single "Love Story", almost one year before the release of Fearless. Swift said she was inspired to write "White Horse" by the moment she realized all the fantasies she had about a boy turned out completely false. The subject was also the inspiration for "Love Story"—Swift never dated him and, although initially infatuated with him, realized he was not an ideal Prince Charming like she thought. She told The Daily Telegraph that she kept his identity anonymous so as to "not glorify his inspirational qualities". Whereas both "Love Story" and "White Horse" feature prominent fairy-tale lyrical imagery, Swift said it was important to regard fairy tales with "both sides"; the former song represented her optimistic and idealistic viewpoint on romance, and the latter her disillusionment with the said notion.

== Release ==
Swift intended to leave "White Horse" off Fearless because she felt the album already had a fair share of sad songs. She changed the decision when the producers of Grey's Anatomy wanted to feature the song in the series. Swift recalled that at a meeting set up by her agency with the show's executive producers Shonda Rhimes and Betsy Beers, she played "White Horse" alone on guitar and they "freaked out". The song appeared on the premiere of season five, broadcast on September 25, 2008. Swift was elated by the feature and said it was her "life goal" to have her song on Grey's Anatomy, one of her favorite series.

"White Horse" was released as an album cut on Fearless, on November 11, 2008, by Big Machine Records. On December 8, Big Machine released the song to US country radio as the second single from the album. In the United States, "White Horse" debuted and peaked at number 13 on the Billboard Hot 100 chart week ending November 29, 2008. It gave Swift her sixth top-20 debut in 2008, which broke the record for the most top-20 debuts in a calendar year by an artist. On Hot Country Songs, the single peaked at number two on the chart week ending April 4, 2009. It was certified double platinum by the Recording Industry Association of America (RIAA) in 2014 and had sold two million digital copies in the United States by 2017. The single also charted in Australia (41), Canada (43), and the United Kingdom (60). It was certified platinum in Australia and gold in Canada.

After signing a new contract with Republic Records, Swift began re-recording her first six studio albums in November 2020. The decision followed a public 2019 dispute between Swift and the talent manager Scooter Braun, who acquired Big Machine Records, including the masters of Swift's albums which the label had released. By re-recording the albums, Swift had full ownership of the new masters, which enabled her to control the licensing of her songs for commercial use and therefore substituted the Big Machine-owned masters. The re-recording of "White Horse", titled "White Horse (Taylor's Version)", was produced by Swift and Christopher Rowe and released as part of Fearless's re-recording, Fearless (Taylor's Version). Swift contacted the singer-songwriters Olivia Rodrigo and Conan Gray to preview a snippet of "White Horse (Taylor's Version)" on their social media on April 8, 2021, one day before Republic Records released Fearless (Taylor's Version). "White Horse (Taylor's Version)" charted in Canada (72) and Australia (99), and it peaked at number 111 on the Billboard Global 200. In the United States, the re-recorded song peaked at number two on Bubbling Under Hot 100 and number 29 on Hot Country Songs.

== Music and lyrics ==
"White Horse" (2008)
"White Horse" is a country pop ballad driven by a finger-picked acoustic guitar, piano and cello accents. In the lyrics, a narrator is disillusioned with her notion of a fairy-tale romance.

"White Horse" runs for 3 minutes and 54 seconds. It is a country pop ballad; Slant Magazine's Jonathan Keefe wrote that it has a pop hook. Written in the key of C major, the song has an understated production driven by a finger-picked acoustic guitar alongside piano arpeggios and cello accents from the first refrain. The beat is created by delicate drum brushes. The sparse production highlights Swift's vocals that some critics found tender and breathy. For certain critics, the track's sound is melancholy and poignant—Jim Abott from the Orlando Sentinel picked it as a track that represents the album's sad songs. The Arizona Republic's Ed Masley attributed this quality to the "haunting" piano and "dark, dramatic" cello. Swift said the sparse production made "White Horse" a Fearless track she was very proud of. The re-recorded "White Horse (Taylor's Version)" has the same arrangement, but the cello in the introduction is more resonant and the outro is a little longer.

The co-writer Liz Rose said the song is "every teenage girl's dream song of everything she ever wished from a boy". In the lyrics, a narrator is heartbroken that the boyfriend whom she used to love turns out contrary to the ideal figure she had hoped for. The narrator and the boyfriend reside in a small town. In the refrain, she compares her romance to a fairy tale fallen apart: "I'm not a princess, this ain't a fairytale/ I'm not the one you'll sweep off her feet/ Lead her up the stairwell." She then tells him that "it's too late for [him] and [his] white horse" to return to her and rekindle the relationship. In the final refrain, the narrator says she will move on from him and escape her town for a bigger world outside, to find somebody else who is more worthy, "This is a big world, that was a small town/ There in my rearview mirror disappearing now."

Some lyrical motifs on "White Horse" reprise those on the preceding Fearless tracks: the narrator dreams of being a "princess" ("Love Story") and compares the subject to an "angel" ("Hey Stephen"). Some critics said "White Horse" is a Fearless track that explores the disconnect between fantasy and real life and an antithesis of the optimist lead single "Love Story", which explores a fairy-tale-inspired romance that has a happy ending. (Note: Attributed to reviews by Billboard's Deborah Evans Price, NME's Hannah Mylrea, and the Reading Eagle) Josh Love in The Village Voice found the lyrics to be from the perspective of a "reborn realist". According to Gigwise's Kelsey Barnes, Swift's vocals in the re-recording no longer display the naivete and shame of feeling sad and instead express the narrator's loss of innocence from a more reflective point-of-view.

== Critical reception ==
When "White Horse" was first released, some critics praised the song for what they deemed a portrayal of heartbreak that, although told from a teenager's perspective, appealed to a broad audience and not just Swift's target audience of teenagers. (Note: Attributed to reviews by Billboard's Ken Tucker, The Korea Times' Cathy Rose A. Garcia, and The Observer's Alice Fisher) Love said its lyrics showcased "preternatural wisdom and inclusiveness", and USA Today's Elysa Gardner complimented the "guileless urgency and unmannered precociousness". Other critics praised the production. Reviewing the single for Billboard, Deborah Evan Price wrote it appealed to many people because its production highlighted Swift's lyrics and "heart-on-the-sleeve" vocals that "[made] the pain and disillusionment palpable". The Guardian's Alex Macpherson lauded the "breathtaking" final refrain, and Keefe, who picked the track as Fearless's best, complimented how "strongly the hooks stand out". Newsday's Glenn Gamboa ranked "White Horse" ninth on a list of the 10 best songs of 2008. At the 2010 Grammy Awards, the single won Best Country Song and Best Female Country Vocal Performance.

Reviewing the re-recorded "White Horse (Taylor's Version)", some critics positively remarked how it retained the original's earnest emotion. In The New York Times, Joe Coscarelli found the re-recording's production fresh and refined, which elevated the original's songwriting. Keefe, who initially criticized Swift's vocals as weak and restrained, wrote that they improved on "White Horse (Taylor's Version)", which consolidated it as the album's best track. Allison Stewart of The Washington Post felt the re-recorded song, though a compelling track, "drags a little". "White Horse" featured highly on some retrospective rankings of Swift's songs, such as those by Masley, who highlighted the "aching" refrain, and The Guardian's Alexis Petridis, who praised its "impressive subtlety".

Some critics were not as complementary and said the lyrics were uncreative—Roisin O'Connor of The Independent said the fairy-tale-indebted narrative was not as effective as that of the previous single, "Love Story". Keefe deemed the lyrical imagery "well worn, clichéd", and NME's Lucy Harbron said it "comes at the expense of emotional heft". The musicologist James E. Perone deemed the lyrics familiar and generic, but contended that the track was effective because of Swift's performance and the "engaging music and musical arrangement".

== Music video ==
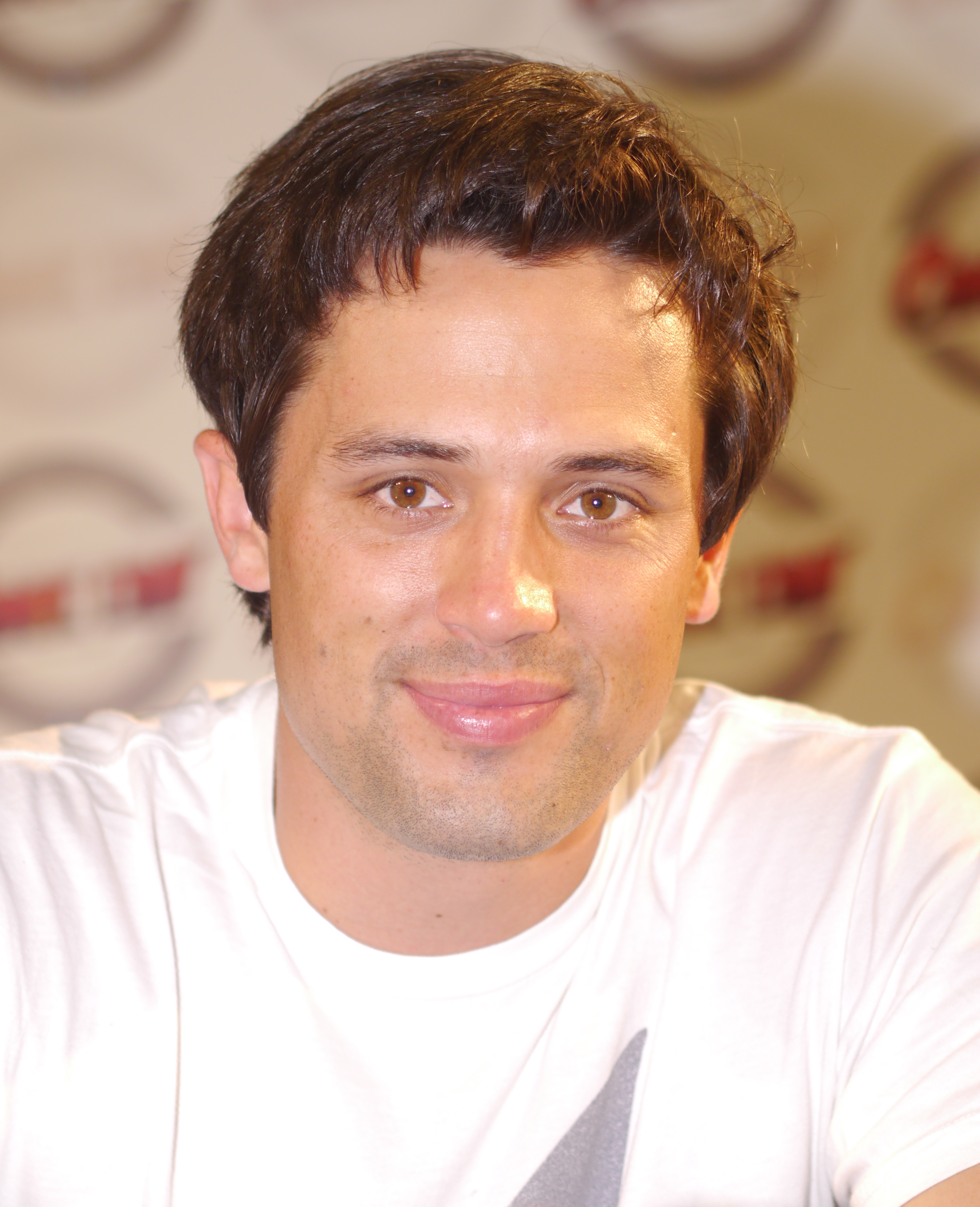
Swift chose Stephen Colletti (pictured in 2012) as the male lead: a character who is seemingly loyal but cheats in a relationship.

Trey Fanjoy, who had directed Swift's previous music videos, returned to film the "White Horse" music video for Swift. On the video's plot, Swift said the theme was infidelity. Because this was also the theme for the music video of her past single "Picture to Burn" (2008), she wanted "White Horse" to convey a different aspect of it: whereas the former stars a girl to whom someone was unfaithful to, the latter depicts a girl whom someone was unfaithful with. Swift explained the concept: "This girl falls in love with this guy and he's perfect. [...] Then, she comes to realize that he's been leading a double life. He was already in a relationship years before he ever met her."

Swift chose the actor Stephen Colletti, whom she had watched on the series One Tree Hill, to portray the male lead because of his sweet and endearing demeanor. According to her, Colletti was ideal to portray a character who seemed as though he would never lie in a relationship but ultimately did and brought "the worst heartbreak". She and Fanjoy shot the video in one day in January 2009, in Germantown, Nashville. It rained heavily that day, which Swift found appropriate for the gloomy and dark feel she wanted: it brought forth more muted tones and made the video less colorful lighting-wise. The last scene, which involved crying, was challenging for Swift because she felt unaccustomed doing so in front of the crew. Fanjoy helped Swift feel more comfortable and guided her into thinking about what made her most solemn; they completed the scene within three hours.

The video starts with Swift's and Colletti's characters talking on the phone. Colletti's character asks if Swift's still loves him and asks for another chance. Then, Swift's character is seen sitting on the living room floor, next to a fireplace, and reminiscing about her intimate moments with him. When she has lunch with a friend at a restaurant, her friend informs her of his infidelity. When Swift's character walks home on a street at night, she sees Colletti's character carrying groceries with another woman into a house. She runs away from the scene and the video transitions to the beginning's phone call, where Colletti's character repeats, "Will you give me another chance?" A rapid flashback of cut-scenes is played and, after its conclusion, Swift denies his request, hangs up, and cries. The video premiered on February 7, 2009, on CMT. It was the first video to debut at number one on CMT's weekly countdown.

== Live performances ==
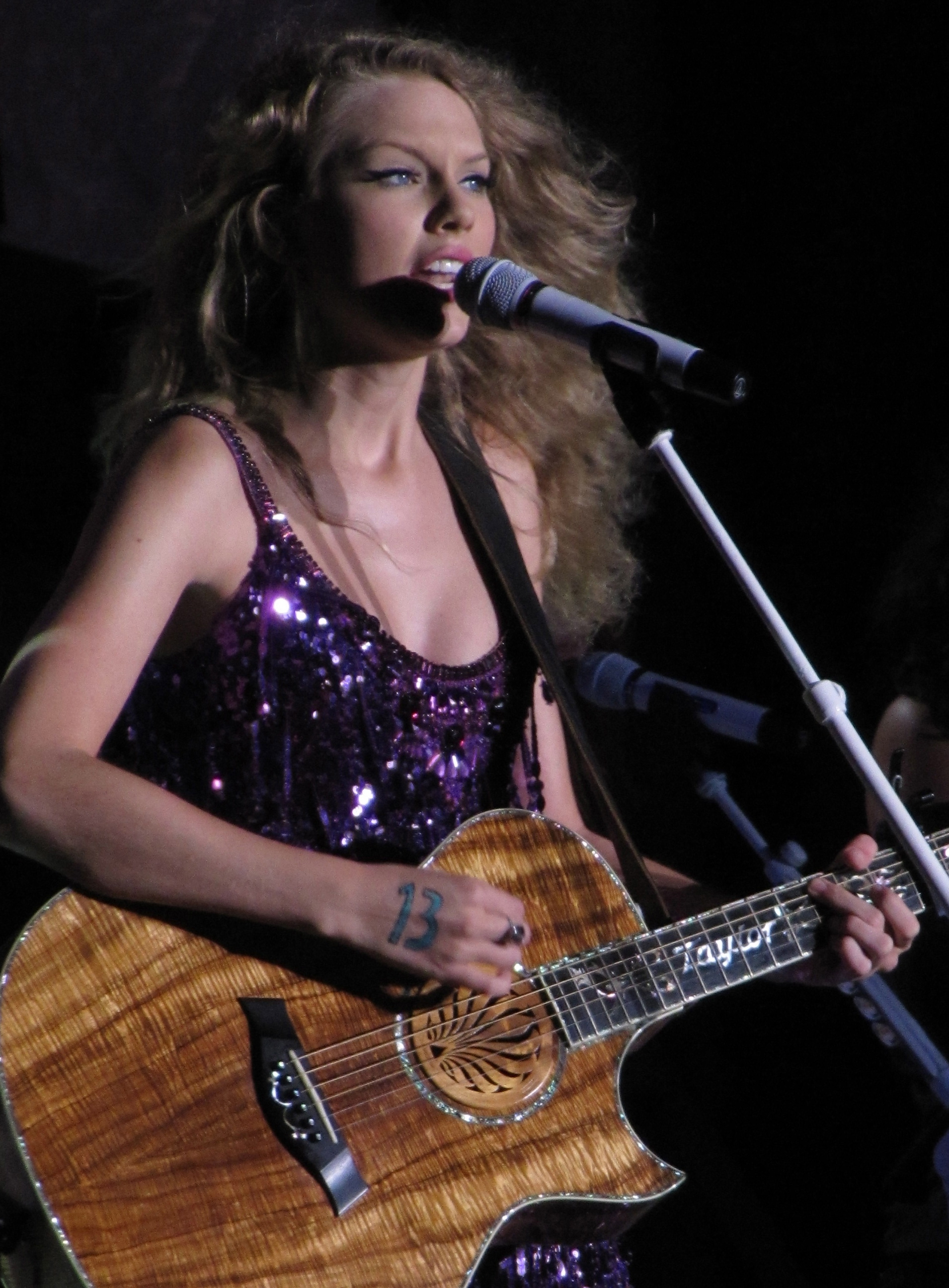
Swift performing live in 2010

Swift first performed "White Horse" at the 2008 American Music Awards on November 23; she donned a white evening gown and sang the song sitting on a floral-patterned couch. She again performed the song at a pre-awards concert for nominees of the 51st Annual Grammy Awards, which was held on December 3, 2008, at the Nokia Theatre in Los Angeles. At the concert, she was the only artist who performed her own song in addition to covering a song that had been inducted into the Grammy Hall of Fame: she sang a portion of Brenda Lee's "I'm Sorry" (1960) before singing "White Horse". In the Los Angeles Times, Ann Powers deemed Swift's rendition of "White Horse" the concert's best performance: "In that moment, Swift had it all: tabloid heat and a firm hold on her brand, along with songcraft and the well-contained charisma of a career artist."

"White Horse" was part of the set lists for Swift's 2009 headline festival performances including Houston Livestock Show and Rodeo, the Florida Strawberry Festival, and Craven Country Jamboree. She also performed "White Horse" live at her Australian concert debut at the Tivoli in Brisbane on March 5, 2009, and on a November 2010 episode of Dancing with the Stars. Swift included "White Horse" in the set list of her first headlining concert tour, the Fearless Tour (2009–2010), where she performed the song by herself on an acoustic guitar. At the Los Angeles concert on May 22, 2009, she sang "White Horse" in a duet with the singer-songwriter John Mayer.

On her later tours, Swift performed the song as a surprise number not part of the regular setlist on select dates. She sang it at the Red Tour concert in Edmonton, June 2013, the 1989 World Tour concert in Los Angeles, August 2015, and the Reputation Stadium Tour concert in Arlington, October 2018. On the Eras Tour, Swift performed "White Horse" as a "surprise song" in Las Vegas, March 2023, and in Sydney (as a mashup with "Coney Island", with Sabrina Carpenter), February 2024.

== Personnel ==
"White Horse" (2008)

- Chad Carlson – recording engineer
- Nathan Chapman – producer
- Taylor Swift – producer
- Steve Blackmon – assistant mixer
- Justin Niebank – mixer

"White Horse (Taylor's Version)" (2021)

- Christopher Rowe – vocals engineer, producer
- Taylor Swift – producer, lead vocals
- David Payne – recording engineer
- Derek Garten – additional engineer
- John Hanes – engineer
- Lowell Reynolds – assistant recording engineer, additional engineer
- Serban Ghenea – mixing
- Mike Meadows – acoustic guitar, background vocals
- Amos Heller – bass guitar
- Matt Billingslea – drums
- Paul Sidoti – piano
- Jonathan Yudkin – strings

== Charts ==
=== Weekly charts ===
Weekly chart performance
Chart (2008–2009)	Peak position
Australia (ARIA)	41
Canada Hot 100 (Billboard)	43
Canada Country (Billboard)	5
UK Singles (Official Charts)	60
US Billboard Hot 100	13
US Hot Country Songs (Billboard)	2
US Pop 100 (Billboard)	23

Weekly chart performance for "Taylor's Version"
Chart (2021)	Peak position
Australia (ARIA)	99
Canada (Canadian Hot 100)	72
Global 200 (Billboard)	111
US Bubbling Under Hot 100 (Billboard)	2
US Hot Country Songs (Billboard)	29

=== Year-end charts ===
Year-end chart performance
Chart (2009)	Position
US Billboard Hot 100	76
US Hot Country Songs (Billboard)	27

== Certifications ==
Certifications
Region	Certification	Certified units/sales
Australia (ARIA)	Platinum	70,000^{‡}
Australia (ARIA) "Taylor's Version"	Gold	35,000^{‡}
Canada (Music Canada)	Gold	40,000^{*}
United States (RIAA)	2× Platinum	2,000,000^{‡}
^{*} Sales figures based on certification alone.^{‡} Sales+streaming figures based on certification alone.
