= Fearless Tour =

2009–2010 concert tour by Taylor Swift

- Tour by Taylor Swift
- Promotional poster for the tour
- Location: United States; Canada; Japan; England; Australia; The Bahamas
- Associated album: Fearless
- Start date: April 23, 2009
- End date: July 10, 2010
- No. of shows: 118
- Supporting acts: Kellie Pickler; Gloriana; Justin Bieber
- Attendance: 1.2 million (99 shows)
- Box office: $66.5 million (99 shows) ($99.8 million in 2025 dollars)

Taylor Swift concert chronology
- Fearless Tour (2009–2010); Speak Now World Tour (2011–2012)

The Fearless Tour was the debut concert tour by the American singer-songwriter Taylor Swift, in support of her second studio album, Fearless (2008). It began in Evansville, Indiana, United States, on April 23, 2009, and concluded in Cavendish, Canada, on July 10, 2010. Swift's first headlining concert tour after she had opened shows for other musicians to support her debut studio album Taylor Swift (2006), it covered 118 dates and visited North America, England, Australia, and Japan.

Kellie Pickler, Gloriana, and Justin Bieber were supporting acts. The set list consisted of songs mostly from Fearless and some from Taylor Swift. The song "You're Not Sorry" was performed as a medley with excerpts from Justin Timberlake's "What Goes Around... Comes Around" (2006). For the 2010 shows, Swift added the soundtrack single "Today Was a Fairytale" to the set list.

Music and media critics generally praised Swift's stage presence, showmanship, and interactions with her audience, although some thought that she did not possess strong live vocals. Upon completion, the Fearless Tour drew 1.2 million people in attendance and grossed $66.5 million. Several shows were recorded and released for a concert series, Journey to Fearless, which aired on The Hub from October 22 to 24, 2010. Journey to Fearless was later released on DVD and Blu-ray in October 2011.

== Background and development ==
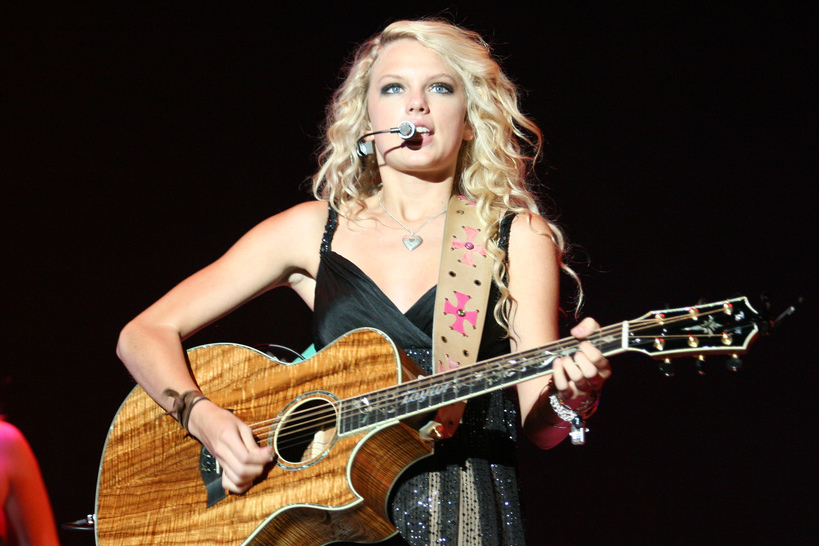
Before headlining the Fearless Tour, Swift had opened shows for other musicians; pictured is Swift opening for Brad Paisley in 2007.

Big Machine Records released Fearless, the second album of the American singer-songwriter Taylor Swift, on November 11, 2008, in North America. She wrote the majority of the album while touring as an opening act for country musicians such as Brad Paisley and Rascal Flatts throughout 2007–2008. Fearless topped the US Billboard 200 for 11 weeks and made Swift the best-selling musician of 2008 in the United States. It also received critical praise for her songwriting and won numerous industry awards.

On January 30, 2009, Swift announced 52 dates for the Fearless Tour, which was her first headlining tour; she said, "I never wanted to go into an arena and have to downsize it so there were only 5,000 or 4,000 people there. [...] So we waited a long time to make sure the headlining tour was everything I wanted [it] to be." To conceptualize her tour, she drew on her experiences opening for other country acts including Paisley, Rascal Flatts, Tim McGraw, Faith Hill, George Strait, and Kenny Chesney. The first 52 shows visited cities across the United States, kicking off in Evansville, Indiana, on April 23, 2009. Kellie Pickler and Gloriana were announced as opening acts. The tour took place after Swift, aged 19, finished high school. This would be her first time touring Australia. Performing at the Burswood Dome (Now defunct)

In mid-2009, Swift announced two shows in England, including a London show announced in June and a Manchester show announced in August; both were scheduled for November. Justin Bieber was announced as the supporting act. On September 30, 2009, Swift announced a February 2010 Australian leg, and a week later, she announced 37 additional shows in North America, scheduled for March–June 2010. In January 2010, she announced a show in Tokyo, Japan, scheduled for February. The last US show was held on June 5, 2010, at Gillette Stadium in Foxborough, Massachusetts. The Fearless Tour also visited the Bahamas and, in total, covered 118 shows over 15 months, until July 10, 2010.

== Production and stage ==
Swift was inspired by her childhood years at the community theater to incorporate theatrical elements to the stage: "[...] I never want people to think that they're just seeing a show where I'm playing song after song after song. When I play a song, I want people to feel like they're experiencing exactly what I went through when I wrote the song as I'm singing it for them." She involved herself in the stage designing process with the production designer Jonathan Smeeton, who helped realize Swift's vision for theatrical and dramatic settings that accompanied the narratives of her songs. Smeeton conceived the ideas and collaborated with Barry Otto from the production company CT Touring over a few weeks at a studio to execute the designs.

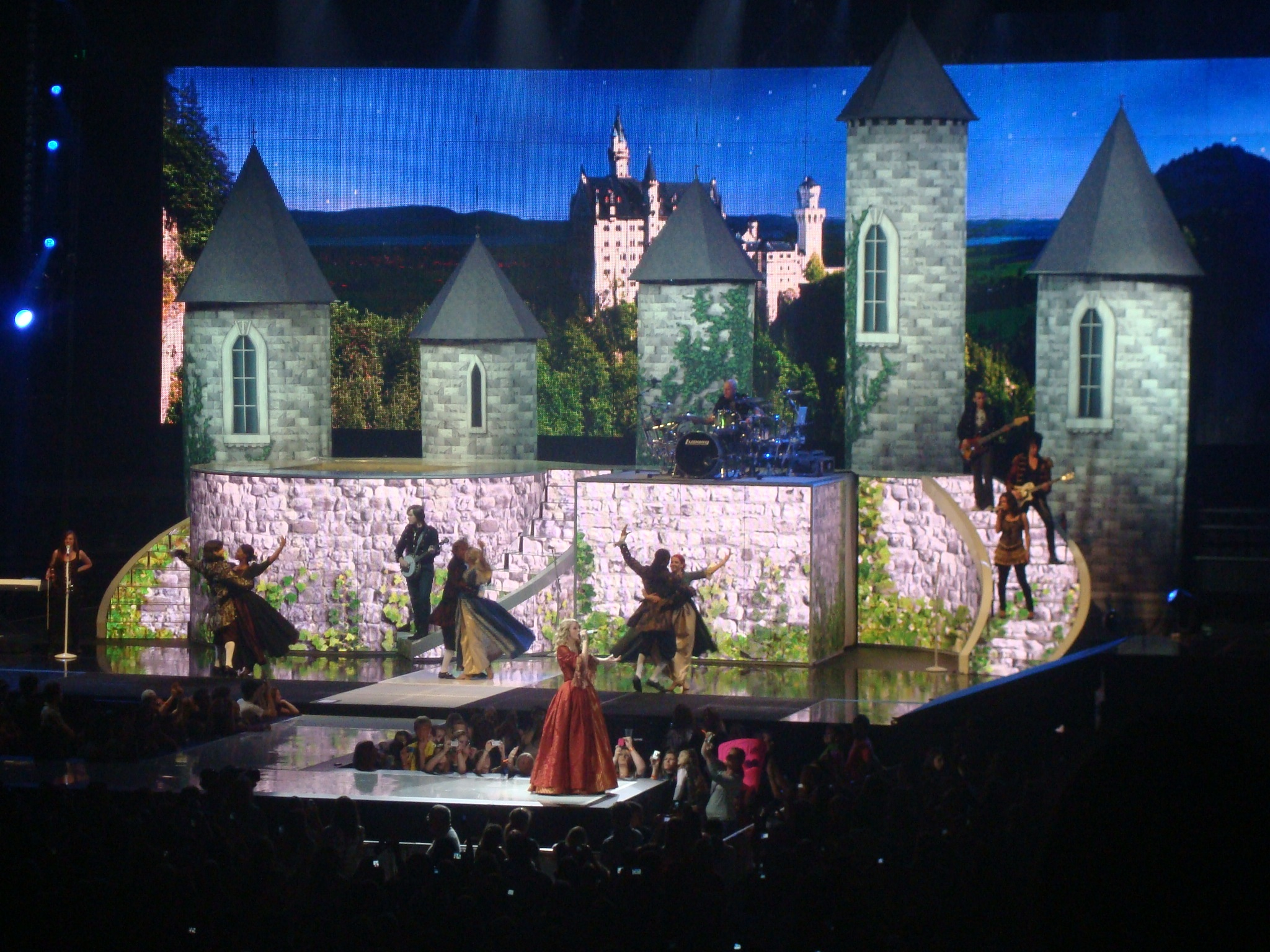
Swift (in red) performing "Love Story"; the two-leveled main stage included a LED back wall onto which images and videos were projected and three winding staircases.

The set included a back wall built from LED panels, a middle ground with five towers and two flying screens, and a foreground with a 10-feet-square drum riser at the left stage and a 20-feet diameter circular riser at the right. Both risers were 8 feet tall, giving another projection surface right off the stage itself. All pieces were designed in white to best showcase the projected images. Images that were projected onto the background included "Bavarian castles", "Victorian ivy", flying butterflies, and clouds; each were used in different song performances to accompany their individual meanings and statements. A fairytale-inspired castle, co-designed by Swift, featured more than one million lumens of light. In total, the equipment included 12 Barco FLM HD projectors, 56 Martin Professional 40mm LED panels, 4 Sony HDC 1500 HD cameras, and 1 Grass Valley Kayak 200 HD flypack system. The two-storied main stage consisted of three winding staircases, a background for projections, and extensions that allowed the audience to better interact with Swift; an auxiliary state where she sang some acoustic songs was a rotating stage in the back, on the floor.

The tour's front of house (FOH) engineer, Russell Fischer, and mixer, Andrea "Vito" Carena, chose Audio-Technica's 5000 Series Wireless System for the lead and background vocals. Swift used Audio-Technica's Artist Elite 5000 Series UHF Wireless System with an AEW-T4100 handheld transmitter for her lead vocals. Fischer selected other microphones from Audio-Technica for the background vocals (AEW-T5400), systems (AEW-R5200), guitars and overheads (AT4050 Cardioid), and kick drums (ATM25 Hypercardioid). Fischer selected Audio-Technica because their products had "massive rejection and controllable gain before feedback" and ensured that the feedback generated by Swift's movements around the audio systems did not get into the mix.

One month before the tour kicked off, Swift held open-call auditions to recruit dancers. Six dancers in total were finalized: three males and three females. Rehearsals took place in an old steel factory in Nashville, Tennessee, starting in February 2009 and lasting for over a month. There were over 150 personnel working full-time for the Fearless Tour, including band members, dancers, stage designers, logisticians, chefs, wardrobe personnel, public relations personnel, and drivers for trucks and buses.

== Concert synopsis ==
Each concert lasted for two hours and encompassed 17 songs for the 2009 shows and 16 songs for 2010. The set list consisted of songs mostly from Fearless and some from Swift's 2006 album Taylor Swift. Before the concert began, the screen showed footage of celebrities including Miley Cyrus, Faith Hill, and Garth Brooks sharing their definitions of the word "fearless".

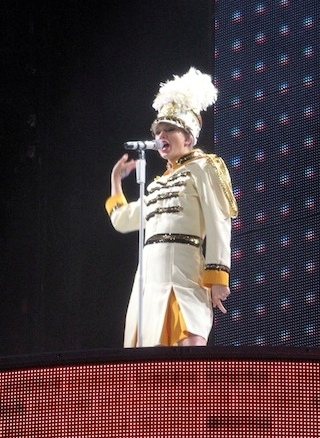
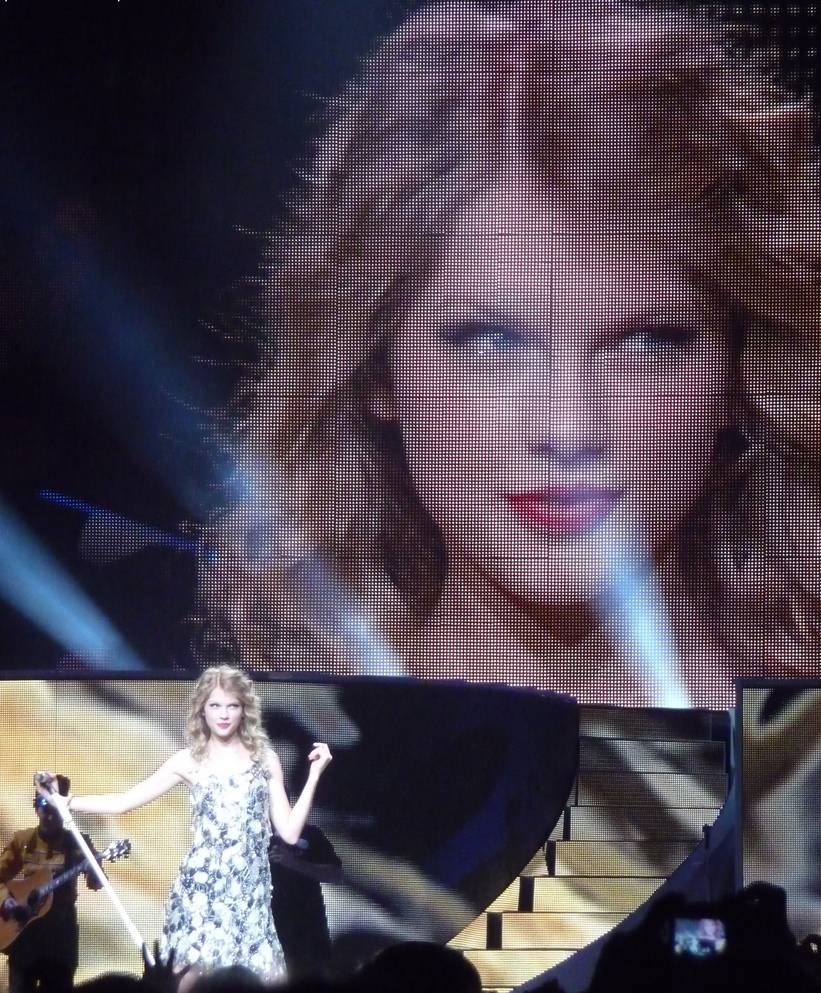
Swift performed the opening number "You Belong With Me" first in a marching band outfit (left) before changing to a sparkling cocktail dress (right).

The show opened with the stage decorated as a school hallway as background videos showed lockers; six background dancers were dressed as cheerleaders, and the seven-member backing band wore marching band outfits. Swift appeared at the top of the stage, in a drum majorette uniform, and sang "You Belong with Me". Midway, the dancers removed her marching-band outfit to reveal a sparkling, silver cocktail dress and boots. She then played a sparkling rhinestoned acoustic guitar to sing "Our Song" before she performed "Tell Me Why". Then, she spoke to her audience about an unrequited love in high school, as the background screen showed a library, and performed "Teardrops on My Guitar"; she played a helpless school girl who watched her love interest (played by a male dancer) dance with another girl. After speaking to her audience about finding true love, she sang "Fearless", strumming an acoustic guitar and twirling across the stage.

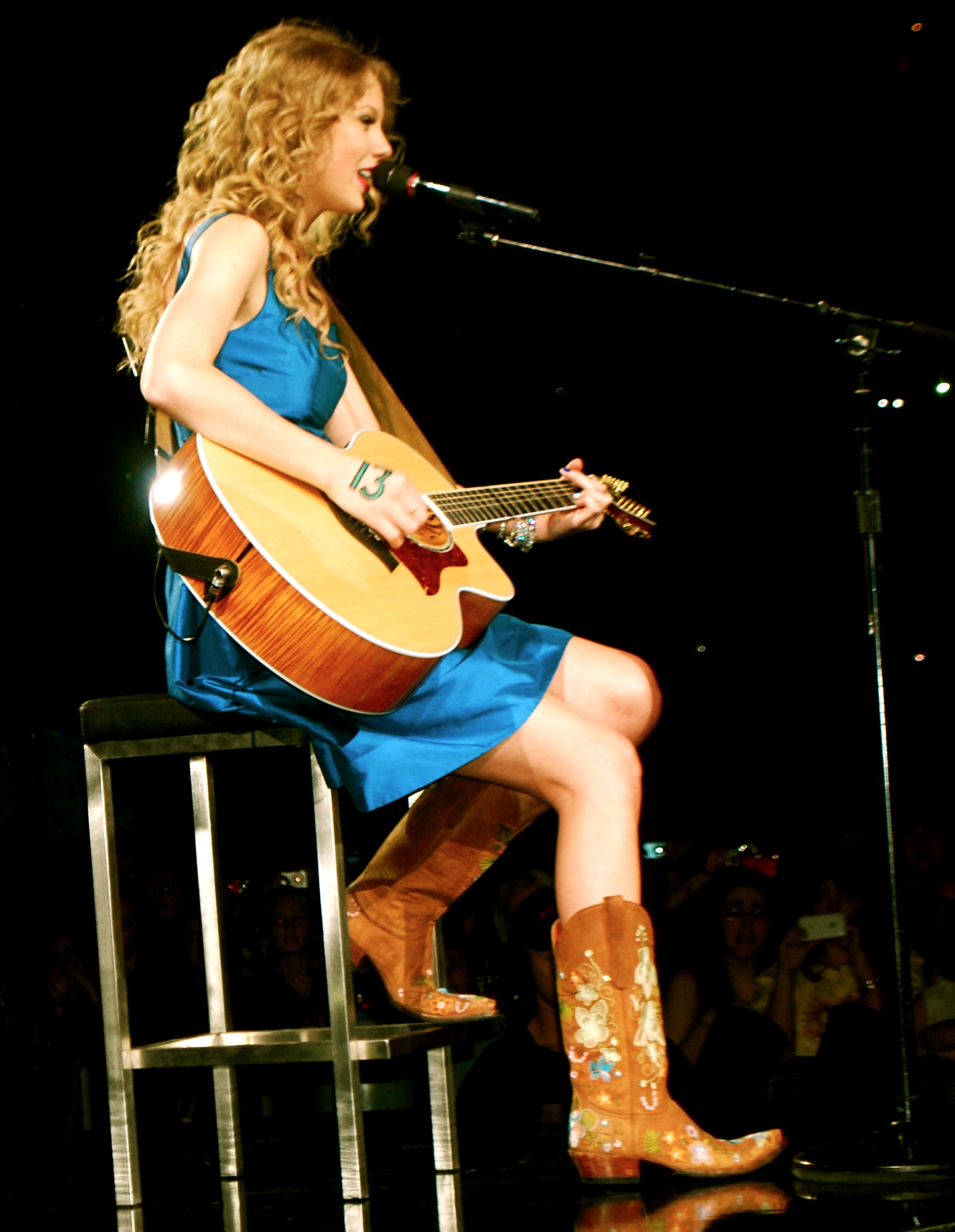
For the B-stage, Swift performed acoustic versions of her songs on guitar, donning a knee-length dress and cowboy boots.

The next segment began with a video showing Swift doing a mock interview with Hoda Kotb, who asked Swift why any male should date her if she would call out their wrongdoings in her songs. Swift responded that if the boyfriends did not want that they "shouldn't do bad things". She then appeared onstage in a red dress and performed "Forever & Always", during which she threw an armchair down the staircase onstage. The concert proceeded with a video skit titled "Crimes of Passion" featuring a detective tracing how Swift's name-dropping ex-boyfriends in her songs affected their lives. The next segment was a mid-show acoustic session, which began with "Hey Stephen". Swift sang the song on an acoustic guitar, standing in the aisle of lower-level seating. Midway through the song, Swift, in a knee-length dress and cowboy boots, went down the aisle toward a rotating B-stage at the floor level, as she hugged her fans and signed autographs for them. At the B-stage, she performed acoustic versions of "Fifteen" and "Tim McGraw" on a guitar. Swift then returned to the main stage for "White Horse".

For the performance of "Love Story", the backup dancers wore Victorian clothing and danced to Pachelbel's Canon as a castle backdrop was projected onto the stage. Swift appeared at the top of the stage, donning a crimson gown with golden accents that critics said to evoke the fashion from the Victorian, Edwardian, or Elizabethan eras. For the final chorus of "Love Story", Swift hid behind backup dancers as she changed into a white wedding dress and a jeweled headband. She then changed to a sparkling purple mini-dress to sing "The Way I Loved You", accompanied by a male backup dancer in a tuxedo.

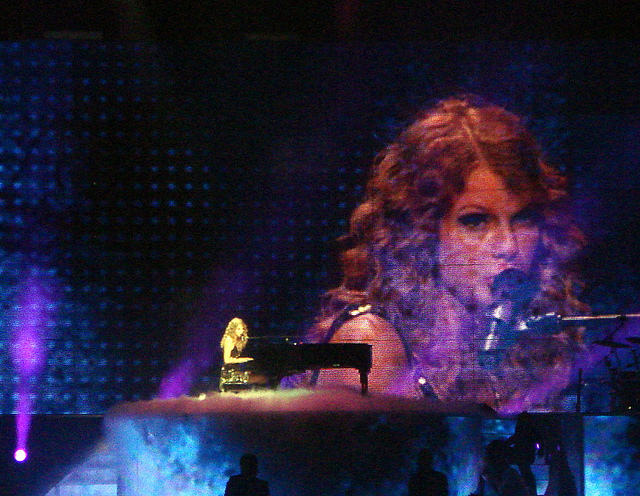
Swift playing a baby grand piano to sing "You're Not Sorry"

Next, she played a baby grand piano at the top of the stage to sing "You're Not Sorry" before incorporating excerpts of Justin Timberlake's "What Goes Around...Comes Around" as the stage lighting flashed, guitar chords played loudly, and the dancers, in black, performed hip-hop-inspired acrobatics. The next number was "Picture to Burn", accompanied by background projections of burning flames. "Change", included in the 2009 concerts, closed the segment: Swift shared her thoughts on 2009 as a "tough year" as the screen projected images of victims of economic and natural disasters, and as she sang the lyrics about "things [turning] around", the projections showed images of triumph.

The encore for the 2009 shows included two songs: "I'm Only Me When I'm with You" and "Should've Said No"; she sang the former with the supporting acts Gloriana and Kellie Pickler as confetti fell down the stage. For the 2010 shows, Swift replaced "I'm Only Me When I'm with You" with the soundtrack single "Today Was a Fairytale" and sang it alone. For the closing number, "Should've Said No", she recalled an ex-boyfriend who cheated on her in a speech to the audience before singing the song as the stage was accompanied by artificial rainfall.

== Critical reception ==
The Fearless Tour received generally positive reviews in the press. Many journalists commented that Swift's stage presence and interactions with her audience contributed to her relatability. Reviewing the Los Angeles shows, Craig Rosen from The Hollywood Reporter highlighted her girl-next-door persona and August Brown from the Los Angeles Times thought that she radiated a "real and immediate identification" with her fans. Craig S. Semon from the Telegram & Gazette and Kevin C. Johnson of the St. Louis Post-Dispatch deemed her stage presence confident and contagious. The Indianapolis Star's David Lindquist wrote that the show was successful thanks to the moments where Swift shared her life stories and experiences with fans. MTV's Jocelyn Vena wrote of the show held at Madison Square Garden in New York: "There wasn't a moment when the crowd wasn't enthralled or charmed by Swift." Lynn Saxberg of the Ottawa Citizen thought that the audience was charmed by Swift's sincerity: "She sang with conviction, performed with confidence and you couldn't help smiling at her enthusiasm as she tossed her long, blond curly hair." In the Arkansas Democrat-Gazette, Jennifer Christman called Swift "a fierce force to be reckoned with".

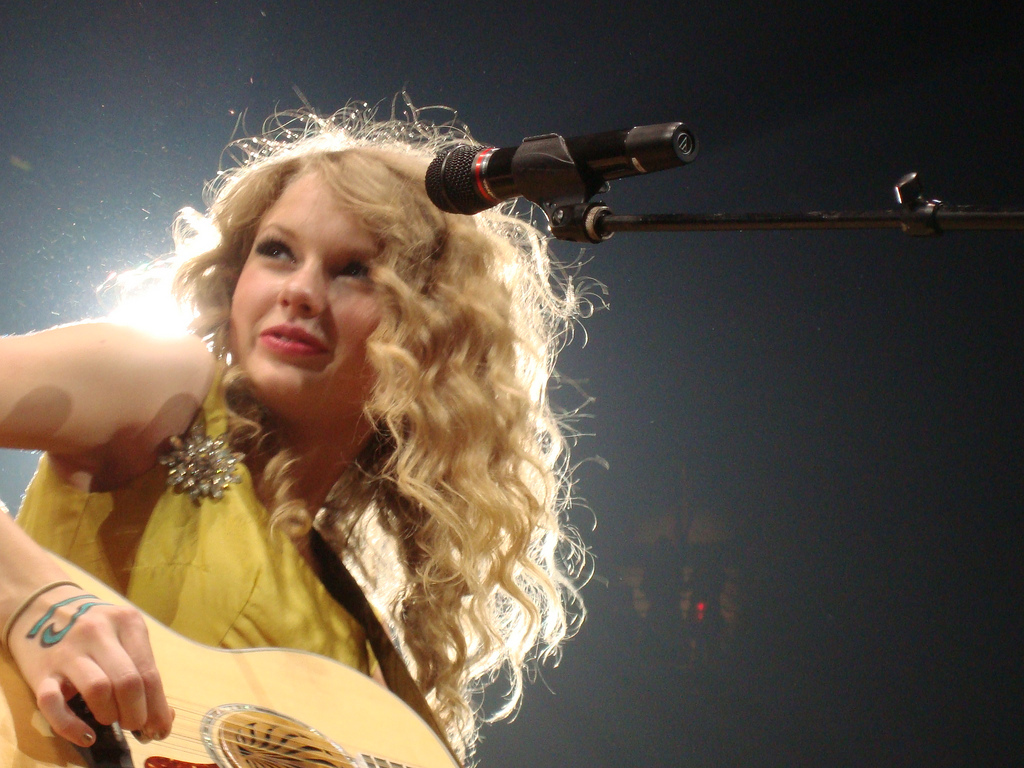
Some critics praised the acoustic segment where Swift played songs on an acoustic guitar; pictured is Swift singing "Fifteen".

Other reviews praised Swift's songwriting and artistry. The Washington Post's David Malitz wrote that Swift did not have the "most dynamic" stage presence, but he said her performances made the emotional sentiments of her songs more palpable. Jon Pareles of The New York Times and Scott Mervis of the Pittsburgh Post-Gazette were entertained by Swift's showmanship and acting skills that accompanied different numbers; the former selected the "wrathful" numbers of "You're Not Sorry" and "Should've Said No" as highlights. The Salt Lake Tribune's David Burger and The Florida Times-Union's Tom Szaroleta opined that Swift had an admirable showmanship that eluded veteran performers. Molly Trust of Billboard complimented the set list for balancing between high-energy numbers and mellow ballads and lauded Swift for both her musicianship and her crowd-engaging talents. In more reserved reviews, the Phoenix New Times Christina Fuoco-Karasinski, The Oklahoman's Brandy McDonnell, and The Seattle Times Mary Guiden thought that some numbers were rather too sweet, immature, and high-school-oriented that were not to their likings, but they all deemed them highly resonant with Swift's predominantly teenage fans.

There were different opinions on Swift's live vocals. Malitz wrote it was "easy to overlook the fact that Swift has a fairly ordinary voice". Mervis opined that she had a "quite lovely" voice that was best portrayed during the acoustic numbers. Sean Daly of the Tampa Bay Times described Swift's vocals as "sweet, if thin" and wrote: "[...] what she lacks in vocal chops, she more than makes up for in star power." Saxberg thought that despite the criticism of Swift's limited vocal range, her voice was "strong and clear, refreshingly uncluttered with vocal gymnastics". McDonnell said that Swift did not possess strong vocals as with other female country singers but sounded "strong and sure" throughout the show, which was most showcased via the acoustic segment. Fuoco-Karasinski similarly deemed the acoustic segment the show's most charming part. Hazel Sheffield of The Daily Telegraph gave the London concert a four-star rating; she wrote that although Swift's vocals "often err on the flat side", she was a winning performer thanks to her relatability and unassuming personality. Alice Fisher of The Observer thought that despite the emotionally resonant songs, Swift's appeal as a performer was "less obvious" because of her sometimes awkward facial expressions or dance moves. Reviews of the last US show in Foxborough opined that Swift had improved her live vocals; Jay N. Miller of The Patriot Ledger admired Swift's vocal stability, and James Reed of The Boston Globe said her voice was "mostly fine"; the latter deemed "Fifteen" the show's highlight for being authentic and honest.

Some critics retrospectively commented that Swift's fashion and stage during the tour became some of her trademarks. Annie Zaleski wrote that the acoustic segment of the Fearless Tour was the blueprint for Swift's later tours and highlighted the sparkly dresses as a memorable look. Nina Braca in Billboard also identified some fashion statements that became iconic: Swift's blonde curly hair locks, "glittery gold outfits", and winged eyeliner.

== Ticket sales and box office ==
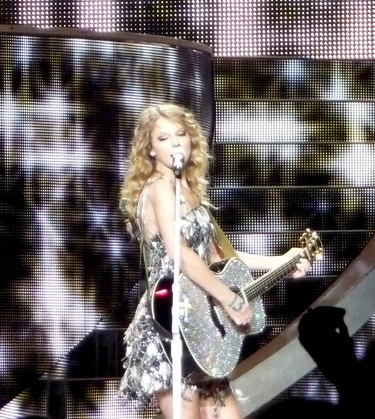
Swift performing at the Staples Center in Los Angeles; tickets for the show on May 22, 2009, sold out in two minutes.

Tickets for the first Fearless Tour shows went on sale starting February 6, 2009, through Ticketmaster. Billboard reported that the tour "sold out every show within minutes" and declared Swift one of the "rising stars" in touring. The first on-sale tickets were for the May 22, 2009, Los Angeles show at Staples Center, and they sold out within two minutes. The next on-sale shows were similarly sold out in minutes; the Evansville show sold out in just 30 seconds and the New York City show within 60 seconds. In honor of the kickoff of the sold-out tour in Evansville, Swift was presented the key to the city and the City Council President declared April 23, 2009, to be "Taylor Swift Day". High demands for the tour drove a secondary market where scalpers resold tickets at a much higher price than the original; Louis Messina, the president of the tour's promoter AEG Live, said that the situation demanded legal intervention and had lobbied for anti-scalping laws.

Sales for the second US leg took place via Comcast starting October 23, 2009, after the first leg had wrapped. Tickets for all of the 15 announced stops sold out within two minutes, leading Swift to add additional shows. Her headlining performance at Country USA in Oshkosh, Wisconsin, on June 24, 2009, registered 42,000 people in attendance, the largest up to that point during the festival's 14-year history. Her headlining session at the North Dakota State Fair on July 25, 2009, attracted 50,646 people, marking the first time the festival recorded a daily attendance of over 40,000. Swift became one of the artists to sell out the Save Mart Center in Fresno, California less than 10 minutes, and she became the first female musician to headline and sell out Gillette Stadium in Foxborough.

According to Pollstar, it was the 48th-highest-grossing tour of 2009 and 28th-highest-grossing of 2010. As reported by Billboard, the Fearless Tour was one of the "Hot Tours" and the 15th-highest-grossing of 2010, with 45 sellout shows out of 47 total, 643,168 in attendance, and $40,312,810 in gross. The highest-grossing show was at Gillette Stadium in Foxborough; it brought $3.7 million in ticket sales from 56,868 concertgoers. In total, Billboard reported that the tour grossed $63,705,590 from 89 reported shows and recorded an audience of 1,138,977. A finalized estimate by Billboard as of 2018 claimed that the total gross was $66.5 million.

== Recording and broadcast ==
On May 31, 2009, NBC broadcast a one-hour special titled Dateline: On Tour with Taylor Swift as part of Dateline. The special was shot over three months and documented the making and behind-the-scenes of the Fearless Tour, including concert backstage footage from the United States, the United Kingdom, and Australia. Footage of the tour also featured in the music video for the track "Fearless", released in February 2010. From October 22–24, 2010, The Hub aired a three-part music documentary miniseries titled Journey to Fearless.

Journey to Fearless was released on Blu-ray and DVD through Shout! Factory on October 11, 2011; it runs for 135 minutes and contains 13 live numbers alongside behind-the-scenes footage. American Songwriter's Dan Weiss found the DVD release's timing odd because it was concurrent with the release of Speak Now World Tour – Live, when Swift was promoting her third album Speak Now. Giving it a 2.5-star rating, Weiss said that the DVD contained some lovely moments, but it was not groundbreaking and offered insufficient insights into Swift's rise to stardom. McDonnell was more positive and said the DVD was a "fun way" for fans to explore Swift more deeply. In 2016, Journey to Fearless was certified platinum by the Australian Recording Industry Association for its DVD sales in Australia.

== Set list ==
The following is the set list adapted from the show on May 1, 2009, in Jacksonville. It is not meant to represent all shows.

1. "You Belong with Me"
2. "Our Song"
3. "Tell Me Why"
4. "Teardrops on My Guitar"
5. "Fearless"
6. "Forever & Always"
7. "Hey Stephen"
8. "Fifteen"
9. "Tim McGraw"
10. "White Horse"
11. "Love Story"
12. "The Way I Loved You"
13. "You're Not Sorry" / "What Goes Around... Comes Around"
14. "Picture to Burn"
15. "Change"

Encore

16. "I'm Only Me When I'm with You" (with Kellie Pickler and Gloriana)
17. "Should've Said No"

Notes

- "Change" was removed from the set list on October 1, 2009.
- "Today Was a Fairytale" replaced "I'm Only Me When I'm with You" for the 2010 shows.
- "The Best Day" was performed in Evansville on April 23, 2009, and in Moline on May 8, 2010.
- "Jump then Fall" was performed during the encore in Foxborough on June 5, 2010.

Special guests

- During the show in Los Angeles on May 22, 2009, Swift performed "Your Body Is a Wonderland" and "White Horse" with John Mayer.
- During the show in Nashville on September 12, 2009, Swift performed "This Kiss" and "The Way You Love Me" with Faith Hill.
- During the show in Los Angeles on April 15, 2010, Swift performed "Hot n Cold" with Katy Perry.

== Tour dates ==
List of 2009 concerts
Date (2009)	City	Country	Venue	Opening act(s)	Attendance	Revenue
April 23	Evansville	United States	Roberts Municipal Stadium	Gloriana; Kellie Pickler	7,463 / 7,463	$360,617
April 24	Jonesboro	United States	Convocation Center	Gloriana; Kellie Pickler	7,822 / 7,822	$340,328
April 25	St. Louis	United States	Scottrade Center	Gloriana; Kellie Pickler	13,764 / 13,764	$650,420
April 28	Alexandria	United States	Bishop Ireton High School	—N/a	—N/a	—N/a
April 30	North Charleston	United States	North Charleston Coliseum	Gloriana; Kellie Pickler	8,751 / 8,751	$398,154
May 1	Jacksonville	United States	Jacksonville Veterans Memorial Arena	Gloriana; Kellie Pickler	11,072 / 11,072	$507,012
May 2	Biloxi	United States	Mississippi Coast Coliseum	Gloriana; Kellie Pickler	9,436 / 9,436	$437,313
May 6	London	England	Shepherd's Bush Empire	—N/a	6,789 / 6,789	$401,328
May 7	London	England	Shepherd's Bush Empire	—N/a	6,789 / 6,789	$401,328
May 14	Spokane	United States	Spokane Arena	Gloriana; Kellie Pickler	10,798 / 10,798	$482,146
May 15	Seattle	United States	KeyArena	Gloriana; Kellie Pickler	12,061 / 12,061	$528,637
May 16	Portland	United States	Rose Garden	Gloriana; Kellie Pickler	13,226 / 13,226	$613,284
May 17	Nampa	United States	Ford Arena	Gloriana; Kellie Pickler	8,970 / 8,970	$413,622
May 21	Glendale	United States	Jobing.com Arena	Gloriana; Kellie Pickler	13,052 / 13,052	$647,923
May 22	Los Angeles	United States	Staples Center	Gloriana; Kellie Pickler	13,648 / 13,648	$720,940
May 23	Paradise (Note: Labeled as Las Vegas in promotional material)	United States	Mandalay Bay Events Center	Gloriana; Kellie Pickler	8,311 / 8,311	$551,051
May 24	San Diego	United States	Valley View Casino Center	Gloriana; Kellie Pickler	10,174 / 10,174	$502,689
May 26	Salt Lake City	United States	EnergySolutions Arena	Gloriana; Kellie Pickler	13,042 / 13,042	$555,207
June 4 (Note: This concert was a part of BamaJam.)	New Brockton	United States	BamaJam Farms	—N/a	—N/a	—N/a
June 11	Columbia	United States	Merriweather Post Pavilion	Gloriana; Kellie Pickler	17,619 / 17,619	$608,438
June 12	Greensboro	United States	Greensboro Coliseum	Gloriana; Kellie Pickler	14,641 / 14,641	$690,959
June 24 (Note: This concert was a part of the Country USA Festival.)	Oshkosh	United States	Ford Festival Park	—N/a	42,000 / 42,000	—N/a
June 25 (Note: This concert was a part of the Chippewa Valley Country Fest.)	Cadott	United States	Amphitheatre Concert Grounds	—N/a	—N/a	—N/a
July 8	Calgary	Canada	Pengrowth Saddledome	Gloriana; Kellie Pickler	—N/a	—N/a
July 9 (Note: This concert was a part of Commonwealth Country.)	Edmonton	Canada	Commonwealth Stadium	Gloriana; Kellie Pickler	33,910 / 44,500	$2,540,906
July 10 (Note: This concert was a part of the Craven Country Jamboree.)	Craven	Canada	Big Valley Park	—N/a	—N/a	—N/a
July 11	Winnipeg	Canada	MTS Centre	Gloriana; Kellie Pickler	11,369 / 11,369	$512,487
July 16 (Note: This concert was a part of the Country Thunder Festival.)	Twin Lakes	United States	Country Thunder Festival	—N/a	—N/a	—N/a
July 17	Columbus	United States	Value City Arena	Gloriana; Kellie Pickler	—N/a	—N/a
July 18	Charleston	United States	Charleston Civic Center	Gloriana; Kellie Pickler	—N/a	—N/a
July 23 (Note: This concert was a part of the Cheyenne Frontier Days.)	Cheyenne	United States	Cheyenne Frontier Days Arena	Kellie Pickler	—N/a	—N/a
July 24	Rapid City	United States	Barnett Arena	Gloriana; Kellie Pickler	—N/a	—N/a
July 25 (Note: This concert was a part of the North Dakota State Fair.)	Minot	United States	North Dakota State Fair Grandstand	—N/a	50,646 / 50,646	—N/a
August 1	Philadelphia	United States	Wachovia Spectrum	Gloriana; Kellie Pickler	—N/a	—N/a
August 7 (Note: This concert was a part of the WE Fest.)	Detroit Lakes	United States	Soo Pass Ranch	—N/a	—N/a	—N/a
August 9	Omaha	United States	Qwest Center Omaha	Gloriana; Kellie Pickler	13,892 / 13,892	$675,455
August 22 (Note: This concert was part of the V Festival.)	Chelmsford	England	Hylands Park	—N/a	—N/a	—N/a
August 23	Weston-under-Lizard	England	Weston Park	—N/a	—N/a	—N/a
August 27	New York City	United States	Madison Square Garden	Gloriana; Kellie Pickler	13,597 / 13,597	$976,062
August 28	Montville	United States	Mohegan Sun Arena	Gloriana; Kellie Pickler	7,507 / 7,507	$296,306
August 29	University Park	United States	Bryce Jordan Center	Gloriana; Kellie Pickler	—N/a	—N/a
August 30	Louisville	United States	Freedom Hall	Gloriana; Kellie Pickler	—N/a	—N/a
September 3	Duluth	United States	Arena at Gwinnett Center	Gloriana; Kellie Pickler	—N/a	—N/a
September 4	Greenville	United States	Bi-Lo Center	Gloriana; Kellie Pickler	—N/a	—N/a
September 5	Charlotte	United States	Time Warner Cable Arena	Gloriana; Kellie Pickler	14,298 / 14,298	$668,757
September 9	Lafayette	United States	Cajundome	Gloriana; Kellie Pickler	—N/a	—N/a
September 10	Bossier City	United States	CenturyTel Center	Gloriana; Kellie Pickler	—N/a	—N/a
September 11	Birmingham	United States	BJCC Arena	Gloriana; Kellie Pickler	—N/a	—N/a
September 12	Nashville	United States	Bridgestone Arena	Gloriana; Kellie Pickler	14,269 / 14,269	$642,387
September 25	Dallas	United States	American Airlines Center	Gloriana; Kellie Pickler	13,794 / 13,794	$628,062
September 26	North Little Rock (Note: Labeled as Little Rock in promotional material)	United States	Verizon Arena	Gloriana; Kellie Pickler	13,978 / 13,978	$654,089
September 27	Tulsa	United States	BOK Center	Gloriana; Kellie Pickler	—N/a	—N/a
October 1	Pittsburgh	United States	Mellon Arena	Gloriana; Kellie Pickler	—N/a	—N/a
October 2	Grand Rapids	United States	Van Andel Arena	Gloriana; Kellie Pickler	—N/a	—N/a
October 3	Cleveland	United States	Quicken Loans Arena	Gloriana; Kellie Pickler	15,524 / 15,524	$743,492
October 8	Indianapolis	United States	Conseco Fieldhouse	Gloriana; Kellie Pickler	13,373 / 13,373	$634,876
October 9	Rosemont	United States	Allstate Arena	Gloriana; Kellie Pickler	26,265 / 26,265	$1,150,896
October 10	Rosemont	United States	Allstate Arena	Gloriana; Kellie Pickler	26,265 / 26,265	$1,150,896
October 11	Minneapolis	United States	Target Center	Gloriana; Kellie Pickler	13,563 / 13,563	$623,975
November 23	London	England	Wembley Arena	Justin Bieber	11,400 / 11,509	$592,630
November 24	Manchester	England	Manchester Evening News Arena	Justin Bieber	—N/a	—N/a

List of 2010 concerts
Date (2010)	City	Country	Venue	Opening act(s)	Attendance	Revenue
February 4	Brisbane	Australia	Brisbane Entertainment Centre	Gloriana	11,334 / 11,334	$956,505
February 6	Sydney	Australia	Acer Arena	Gloriana	27,030 / 27,030	$2,030,640
February 7	Sydney	Australia	Acer Arena	Gloriana	27,030 / 27,030	$2,030,640
February 8	Newcastle	Australia	Newcastle Entertainment Centre	Gloriana	7,180 / 7,180	$555,396
February 10	Melbourne	Australia	Rod Laver Arena	Gloriana	23,493 / 23,493	$1,627,510
February 11	Melbourne	Australia	Rod Laver Arena	Gloriana	23,493 / 23,493	$1,627,510
February 12	Adelaide	Australia	Adelaide Entertainment Centre	Gloriana	9,066 / 9,066	$585,352
February 17	Tokyo	Japan	Zepp Tokyo	—N/a	—N/a	—N/a
March 4	Tampa	United States	St. Pete Times Forum	Gloriana; Kellie Pickler	13,861 / 13,861	$793,049
March 5	Orlando	United States	Amway Arena	Gloriana; Kellie Pickler	11,101 / 11,101	$598,581
March 7	Sunrise	United States	BankAtlantic Center	Gloriana; Kellie Pickler	13,453 / 13,453	$777,442
March 10	Austin	United States	Frank Erwin Center	Gloriana; Kellie Pickler	11,928 / 11,928	$642,705
March 11	Dallas	United States	American Airlines Center	Gloriana; Kellie Pickler	14,022 / 14,022	$742,954
March 12	Corpus Christi	United States	American Bank Center	Gloriana; Kellie Pickler	8,423 / 8,423	$501,169
March 18	Philadelphia	United States	Wachovia Center	Gloriana; Kellie Pickler	30,360 / 30,360	$2,002,321
March 19	Philadelphia	United States	Wachovia Center	Gloriana; Kellie Pickler	30,360 / 30,360	$2,002,321
March 20	Charlottesville	United States	John Paul Jones Arena	Gloriana; Kellie Pickler	11,858 / 11,858	$664,305
March 26	Auburn Hills (Note: Labeled as Detroit in promotional material)	United States	The Palace of Auburn Hills	Gloriana; Kellie Pickler	29,125 / 29,125	$1,711,591
March 27	Auburn Hills	United States	The Palace of Auburn Hills	Gloriana; Kellie Pickler	29,125 / 29,125	$1,711,591
March 28	Cincinnati	United States	U.S. Bank Arena	Gloriana; Kellie Pickler	11,208 / 11,208	$645,592
March 31	Oklahoma City	United States	Ford Center	Gloriana; Kellie Pickler	11,795 / 11,795	$675,184
April 1	Wichita	United States	Intrust Bank Arena	Gloriana; Kellie Pickler	11,208 / 11,208	$610,801
April 2	Kansas City	United States	Sprint Center	Gloriana; Kellie Pickler	13,781 / 13,781	$761,110
April 6	Denver	United States	Pepsi Center	Gloriana; Kellie Pickler	25,991 / 25,991	$1,497,135
April 7	Denver	United States	Pepsi Center	Gloriana; Kellie Pickler	25,991 / 25,991	$1,497,135
April 10	Fresno	United States	Save Mart Center	Gloriana; Kellie Pickler	11,706 / 11,706	$649,488
April 11	San Jose	United States	HP Pavilion	Gloriana; Kellie Pickler	12,744 / 12,744	$716,726
April 15	Los Angeles	United States	Staples Center	Gloriana; Kellie Pickler	27,518 / 27,518	$1,736,197
April 16	Los Angeles	United States	Staples Center	Gloriana; Kellie Pickler	27,518 / 27,518	$1,736,197
April 29	Lexington	United States	Rupp Arena	Gloriana; Kellie Pickler	17,966 / 17,966	$1,024,223
April 30	Columbia	United States	Colonial Life Arena	Gloriana; Kellie Pickler	13,429 / 13,429	$755,475
May 1	Raleigh	United States	RBC Center	Gloriana; Kellie Pickler	13,895 / 13,895	$752,303
May 6	Des Moines	United States	Wells Fargo Arena	Gloriana; Kellie Pickler	13,264 / 13,264	$738,280
May 7	Saint Paul	United States	Xcel Energy Center	Gloriana; Kellie Pickler	14,914 / 14,914	$846,111
May 8	Moline	United States	iWireless Center	Gloriana; Kellie Pickler	10,641 / 10,641	$610,668
May 12	Newark	United States	Prudential Center	Gloriana; Kellie Pickler	26,065 / 26,065	$1,742,669
May 13	Newark	United States	Prudential Center	Gloriana; Kellie Pickler	26,065 / 26,065	$1,742,669
May 14	Uniondale	United States	Nassau Veterans Memorial Coliseum	Gloriana; Kellie Pickler	25,831 / 25,831	$1,713,529
May 15	Uniondale	United States	Nassau Veterans Memorial Coliseum	Gloriana; Kellie Pickler	25,831 / 25,831	$1,713,529
May 20	Ottawa	Canada	Scotiabank Place	Gloriana; Kellie Pickler	13,376 / 13,376	$873,206
May 21	Toronto	Canada	Air Canada Centre	Gloriana; Kellie Pickler	30,458 / 30,458	$2,497,690
May 22	Toronto	Canada	Air Canada Centre	Gloriana; Kellie Pickler	30,458 / 30,458	$2,497,690
May 25	Houston	United States	Toyota Center	Gloriana; Kellie Pickler	23,493 / 23,493	$1,290,926
May 26	Houston	United States	Toyota Center	Gloriana; Kellie Pickler	23,493 / 23,493	$1,290,926
May 29 (Note: This concert was part of the Bayou Country Superfest.)	Baton Rouge	United States	Tiger Stadium	—N/a	—N/a	—N/a
June 1	Washington, D.C.	United States	Verizon Center	Gloriana; Kellie Pickler	27,290 / 27,290	$1,824,743
June 2	Washington, D.C.	United States	Verizon Center	Gloriana; Kellie Pickler	27,290 / 27,290	$1,824,743
June 5	Foxborough	United States	Gillette Stadium	Gloriana; Justin Bieber; Kellie Pickler	56,868 / 56,868	$3,726,157
June 19	Nassau	The Bahamas	Imperial Ballroom	Gloriana; Kellie Pickler	—N/a	—N/a
July 10 (Note: This concert was part of the Cavendish Beach Music Festival.)	Cavendish	Canada	Cavendish Beach Festival Grounds	—N/a	—N/a	—N/a
Total					1,311,933 / 1,322,632 (99.19%)	$66,839,126
