= So Fresh: The Hits of Summer 2009 =

Compilation album by Various Artists
- Released: 28 November 2008
- Genre: Pop
- Length: 150:28
- Label: Sony BMG

Various Artists chronology
So Fresh: The Hits of Spring 2008 (2008)	So Fresh: The Hits of Summer 2009 (2008)	So Fresh: The Hits of Autumn 2009 (2009)

So Fresh: The Hits of Summer 2009 and the Best of 2008 is a compilation from So Fresh, first released on 28 November 2008.

== Track listing ==
=== Disc 1 ===
1. Pink – "So What" (3:35)
2. Britney Spears – "Womanizer" (3:43)
3. Lady Gaga – "Poker Face" (3:57)
4. The Presets – "Talk Like That" (3:40)
5. Kings of Leon – "Sex on Fire" (3:23)
6. The Pussycat Dolls – "I Hate This Part" (3:39)
7. Christina Aguilera – "Keeps Gettin' Better" (3:02)
8. Kate Miller-Heidke – "Can't Shake It" (3:15)
9. MGMT – "Kids" (5:03)
10. The Living End – "Moment in the Sun" (4:22)
11. Sam Sparro – "21st Century Life" (3:37)
12. Metro Station – "Shake It" (3:00)
13. Leona Lewis – "Bleeding Love" (4:22)
14. Newton Faulkner – "Dream Catch Me" (3:57)
15. Colbie Caillat – "Bubbly" (3:17)
16. Sara Bareilles – "Love Song" (4:18)
17. OneRepublic – "Stop and Stare" (3:43)
18. Short Stack – "Shimmy a Go Go" (3:43)
19. Lenka – "The Show" (3:55)
20. Pnau – "Baby" (2:48)

=== Disc 2 ===
1. Jessica Mauboy featuring Flo Rida – "Running Back" (3:46)
2. Chris Brown featuring Keri Hilson: "Superhuman" (3:37)
3. Ne-Yo – "Miss Independent" (3:51)
4. Dizzee Rascal featuring Calvin Harris and Chrome – "Dance wiv Me" (3:23)
5. Secondhand Serenade – "Fall for You" (3:03)
6. Rihanna – "Don't Stop the Music" (4:28)
7. Natalie Bassingthwaighte – "Alive" (3:31)
8. The Ting Tings – "That's Not My Name" (5:08)
9. Jordin Sparks – "Tattoo" (3:52)
10. Alicia Keys – "No One" (4:14)
11. Kaz James – "We Hold On" (3:31)
12. Kelly Rowland – "Work" (3:11)
13. Nelly featuring Fergie – "Party People" (4:02)
14. The Potbelleez – "Are You with Me" (3:40)
15. Timbaland featuring Keri Hilson and Nicole Scherzinger – "Scream" (3:45)
16. Ashlee Simpson – "Outta My Head (Ay Ya Ya)" (3:37)
17. Brian McFadden – "Like Only a Woman Can" (3:51)
18. Mika – "Big Girl (You Are Beautiful)" (4:07)
19. Hook n Sling – "The Best Thing (2008)" (4:02)
20. Rogue Traders – "I Never Liked You" (3:30)

== Certifications ==
Region	Certification	Certified units/sales
Australia (ARIA)	3× Platinum	210,000^{^}
^{^} Shipments figures based on certification alone.
