= So Fresh: The Hits of Autumn 2010 =

Compilation album by Various artists
- Released: 19 March 2010
- Genre: Pop
- Label: Sony BMG

So Fresh chronology
So Fresh: The Hits of Summer 2010 + the Best of 2009 (2009)	So Fresh: The Hits of Autumn 2010 (2010)	So Fresh: The Hits of Winter 2010 (2010)

So Fresh: The Hits of Autumn 2010 is an Australian compilation album. The album was released on 19 March 2010.

== CD ==
1. Owl City – "Fireflies" (3:48)
2. Kesha featuring 3OH!3 – "Blah Blah Blah" (2:52)
3. Jay Sean featuring Sean Paul and Lil Jon – "Do You Remember" (3:31)
4. Lady Gaga – "Bad Romance" (4:00)
5. Rihanna – "Russian Roulette" (3:46)
6. Stan Walker – "Black Box" (3:28)
7. Justin Bieber – "One Time" (3:36)
8. Richard Vission and Static Revenger featuring Luciana – "I Like That" (2:23)
9. Guy Sebastian – "All to Myself" (4:32)
10. The Black Eyed Peas – "Rock That Body" (4:00)
11. Pink – "Ave Mary A" (3:16)
12. La Roux – "Quicksand" (3:06)
13. Powderfinger – "Burn Your Name" (3:52)
14. Florence and the Machine – "You've Got the Love" (2:46)
15. Chris Brown – "Crawl" (3:57)
16. Natalie Bassingthwaighte – "Love Like This" (3:54)
17. Gossip – "Pop Goes the World" (3:25)
18. Calvin Harris – "Flashback" (3:47)
19. Adam Lambert – "Whataya Want from Me" (3:47)
20. Passion Pit – "Little Secrets" (3:59)

== DVD ==
1. Owl City – "Fireflies"
2. Jay Sean featuring Sean Paul and Lil Jon – "Do You Remember"
3. Lady Gaga – "Bad Romance"
4. Rihanna – "Russian Roulette"
5. Stan Walker – "Black Box"
6. Justin Bieber – "One Time"
7. Richard Vission and Static Revenger featuring Luciana – "I Like That"
8. Guy Sebastian – "All to Myself"
9. Florence and the Machine - "You've Got the Love"
10. Chris Brown – "Crawl"
11. Natalie Bassingthwaighte – "Love Like This"
12. Calvin Harris – "Flashback"
13. Adam Lambert – "Whataya Want from Me"

== Charts ==
=== Year-end charts ===
Chart (2010)	Peak position
Australian ARIA Compilations Chart	4

== Certifications ==
Region	Certification	Certified units/sales
Australia (ARIA)	Platinum	70,000^{^}
^{^} Shipments figures based on certification alone.
