= So Fresh: The Hits of Winter 2009 =

Compilation album by Various artists
- Released: 19 June 2009
- Genre: Pop
- Label: Sony Music

So Fresh chronology
So Fresh: The Hits of Autumn 2009 (2009)	So Fresh: The Hits of Winter 2009 (2009)	So Fresh: The Hits of Spring 2009 (2009)

So Fresh: The Hits of Winter 2009 is a music album that was released on 19 June 2009. It contains a bonus DVD with 12 music videos.

== Track listing (CD) ==
1. The Black Eyed Peas – "Boom Boom Pow" (3:39)
2. A. R. Rahman and The Pussycat Dolls featuring Nicole Scherzinger – "Jai Ho! (You Are My Destiny)" (3:42)
3. Lady Gaga – "LoveGame" (3:36)
4. Ciara featuring Justin Timberlake – "Love Sex Magic" (3:41)
5. Pink – "Bad Influence" (3:36)
6. The Script – "Breakeven" (4:21)
7. Akon featuring Colby O'Donis and Kardinal Offishall – "Beautiful" (5:14)
8. Kelly Clarkson – "I Do Not Hook Up" (3:20)
9. Lady Sovereign – "So Human" (3:08)
10. Natalie Bassingthwaighte – "1000 Stars" (4:00)
11. Soulja Boy featuring Sammie – "Kiss Me thru the Phone" (3:15)
12. Jessica Mauboy – "Because" (4:18)
13. Wes Carr – "Fearless" (2:53)
14. Kid Cudi vs. Crookers – "Day 'n' Nite" (2:44)
15. Franz Ferdinand – "No You Girls" (3:42)
16. Kings of Leon – "Revelry" (3:21)
17. U2 – "Get On Your Boots" (3:25)
18. Cassie Davis featuring Travie McCoy – "Differently" (3:50)
19. Kanye West featuring Young Jeezy – "Amazing" (3:58)
20. The Presets – "If I Know You" (4:28)

== Track listing (DVD) ==
1. The Black Eyed Peas – "Boom Boom Pow"
2. Lady Gaga – "LoveGame"
3. Ciara featuring Justin Timberlake – "Love Sex Magic"
4. The Script – "Breakeven"
5. Akon featuring Colby O'Donis and Kardinal Offishall – "Beautiful"
6. Kelly Clarkson – "I Do Not Hook Up"
7. Lady Sovereign – "So Human"
8. Natalie Bassingthwaighte – "1000 Stars"
9. Soulja Boy featuring Sammie – "Kiss Me thru the Phone"
10. Franz Ferdinand – "No You Girls"
11. Cassie Davis featuring Travis McCoy – "Differently"
12. Kanye West featuring Young Jeezy – "Amazing"

== Charts ==
Chart (2009)	Peak position
Australian ARIA Compilations Chart	1

=== Year-end charts ===
Chart (2009)	Peak position
Australian ARIA Compilations Chart	8

== Certifications ==
Region	Certification	Certified units/sales
Australia (ARIA)	Platinum	70,000^{^}
^{^} Shipments figures based on certification alone.
