= Fifteen (song) =

2009 single by Taylor Swift

Single by Taylor Swift

from the album Fearless
- Released: August 31, 2009
- Recorded: 2008
- Studio: Blackbird (Nashville)
- Genre: Country pop; guitar pop
- Length: 4:54
- Label: Big Machine
- Songwriter: Taylor Swift
- Producers: Taylor Swift; Nathan Chapman

Taylor Swift singles chronology
"You Belong with Me" (2009)	"Fifteen" (2009)	"Two Is Better Than One" (2009)

Music video
- "Fifteen" on YouTube

"Fifteen" is a song written and recorded by the American singer-songwriter Taylor Swift for her second studio album, Fearless (2008). Inspired by Swift's high-school freshman year, the lyrics narrate how she and her friend Abigail Anderson, both at 15, experience teenage heartbreak and realize life aspirations. Swift included the track on the album after Anderson consented to the personal references. She and Nathan Chapman produced "Fifteen", a country pop song with a pop melody. Big Machine Records released "Fifteen" to American country radio on August 31, 2009, as the fourth single from Fearless.

Swift partnered with the electronics retailer Best Buy for "@15", a charity initiative for teenagers. "Fifteen" charted and received certifications in Australia, Canada, and the United States. Music critics lauded Swift's songwriting for creating a catchy sound and using storytelling with vivid details to earnestly portray teenage experiences; many picked it as an album and career highlight. The single won a Teen Choice Award for Choice Country Song. Some feminist authors criticized the lyrics mentioning Anderson's disappointment after she "gave everything she had to a boy who changed his mind" as sex-negative.

Roman White directed the music video for "Fifteen", which uses a green screen and features Swift reliving high-school memories with Anderson in a garden. It received a nomination for Best Female Video at the 2010 MTV Video Music Awards. Swift performed "Fifteen" at the 2009 Grammy Awards, at the 2009 Country Music Association Awards, on TV shows in the United States and England, and on the Fearless Tour (2009–2010) and the Speak Now World Tour (2011–2012). After a 2019 dispute regarding the ownership of Swift's back catalog, she released a re-recorded version, "Fifteen (Taylor's Version)", as part of her re-recorded album Fearless (Taylor's Version) (2021).

== Background and writing ==
Taylor Swift wrote songs for her second studio album, Fearless, while touring as an opening act for other country musicians to promote her first album Taylor Swift during 2007–2008, when she was 17–18 years old. Continuing the romantic themes of her first album, Swift wrote songs about love and personal experiences from the perspective of a teenage girl to ensure her fans could relate to Fearless. To this extent, Swift said that nearly every album track had a "face" that she associated with it. The end product is a collection of songs about the challenges of love with prominent high-school and fairy-tale lyrical imagery. Swift and the producer Nathan Chapman recorded over 50 songs for Fearless, and "Fifteen" was one of the 13 tracks that made the final cut. They produced the track, and Justin Niebank mixed it at Blackbird Studios in Nashville.

Swift was inspired to write "Fifteen" by her high-school freshman year experiences in Hendersonville, Tennessee. She began with the lyric "And Abigail gave everything she had to a boy/ Who changed his mind/ We both cried", which refers to her real-life best friend Abigail Anderson. She wrote the rest of the song based on this line. In a blog explaining the meaning behind all Fearless tracks published by Big Machine Records, Swift wrote about "Fifteen": "I just decided I really wanted to tell that story about our first year of high school because I felt in my freshman year, I grew up more than any year in my life so far." She said that the song both reflected her and Abigail's experiences with first love and heartbreak and offered a cautionary tale to her intended audience of teenage girls entering or already in their freshman year of high school.

After finishing the song, Swift was unsure of how Anderson would respond because it "was a really personal song, especially from her angle of it". Before including it on the album, she performed it for Anderson and asked whether she was comfortable with it. Anderson then consented to the personal references and said, "If one girl can kind of learn from it or connect to a song like that, it's totally worth it." Swift told CMT that recording "Fifteen" was like witnessing a loved one of hers undergo pain, which made her cry.

== Music and lyrics ==
"Fifteen"
"Fifteen" is a country pop ballad driven by mandolin, inspired by Swift's high-school freshman year. Its lyrics narrate how she and her friend Abigail Anderson went through teenage love and heartbreak.

"Fifteen" is 4 minutes and 55 seconds long. It is a country pop ballad. Driven by a mandolin, it concludes with an outro where Swift sings, "la la la." Critics said that "Fifteen" has a prominent pop production; Larry Rodgers of The Arizona Republic described it as "rootsy pop", and John Terauds of the Toronto Star deemed it guitar pop. Grady Smith of Rolling Stone listed "Fifteen" as one of the "countriest" songs by Swift, stating the song was a counterpart to the more radio-friendly "Love Story" and "You Belong with Me" from Fearless.

The lyrics of "Fifteen" have Swift narrating about multiple events. In the first verse, Swift details first entering high school with intentions of merely staying out of her peers' way. The second verse bears Swift meeting Anderson and gossiping about the school's queen bees with her. Successively, Swift describes first dates and falling in love for the first time. However, Swift and Anderson become heartbroken, revealing that Anderson "gave everything she had" to someone who later changed his mind. The song's refrains have Swift cautioning young girls to not fall in love easily and acknowledging that she came to the realization of being able to accomplish more than dating a football team member. Terauds and Tom Gardner of The Daily Gleaner wrote that "Fifteen" was musically and thematically reminiscent of Janis Ian's "At Seventeen" (1975).

== Critical reception ==
In reviews of Fearless, critics lauded Swift's songwriting craftsmanship on "Fifteen". Grady Smith of Rolling Stone wrote that while "Love Story" and "You Belong with Me" brought Swift to mainstream fame, "Fifteen" consolidated her status as a songwriter because it is a "deftly worded tune" that deals with subject matters like "the perils of high school, young love and even the loss of virginity". Many reviewers recommended "Fifteen" for download. (Note: Including Joe Breen of The Irish Times, Rashod D. Ollison of The Baltimore Sun, John P. McLaughlin of The Province, Elysa Gardner of USA Today, and Chris Richards of The Washington Post) Elysa Gardner of USA Today and Chris Richards of The Washington Post opined that its adolescent sentiments are genuine and authentic, as opposed to the general music by other teenage artists, a sentiment that was corroborated by Leah Greenbelt of Entertainment Weekly ("When she sings about sexuality, she sounds like a real teen, not some manufactured vixen-Lolita") and Craig Mathieson of The Age ("[The song] is high-school angst that rings truer than most eruptions of mall-boy emo"). James Reed of The Boston Globe wrote, "You can practically see the lyrics ... scribbled in a diary."

Elysa Gardner, the Telegram & Gazette's Craig S. Semon, and The Guardian's Alexis Petridis added that the track showcased a precociousness. Stephen Thomas Erlewine of AllMusic found that Swift portrays "a big sister instead of a big star" in "Fifteen", which exemplified her "maturation" that was "deliberate and careful". Ken Tucker of Billboard believed the song could appeal with teenagers looking for hope and adult women reminiscing the past, and Rob Sheffield of Blender wrote that the track showcased an "adult restraint" while still letting the teenage sentiments shine. In The Village Voice, Josh Love selected "Fifteen" as a standout for showcasing Swift's "sharp, unsparing" talent for portraying high-school romance as "neither as fairy tale nor tragedy, but instead as the mixed-up cycle of fun and frustration it really is", compared to other "ridiculously idealized" country songs. Semon was impressed by Swift's ability at 18 years old to look back at her early teenage years with mature hindsight, but Petridis thought that it was "a bit creepy" to see an 18-year-old reflecting through "wizened-but-wise eyes", writing: "You applaud her skill, while feeling slightly unsettled by the thought of a teenager pontificating away like Yoda."

Other critics commented on the melody. Tucker wrote that "no one speaks with more authority and catchy precision than Taylor Swift". Greenbalt said that "Fifteen" was a "beautifully crafted" song, and the Belfast Telegraph hailed it as a "really great modern pop song". Writing for the Philadelphia Daily News, Jonathan Takiff described the sound as "equally endearing, vulnerable and flirty". Jody Rosen, in a review for Rolling Stone, selected "Fifteen" as a demonstration of Swift as "a songwriting savant with an intuitive gift for verse-chorus-bridge architecture". Rosen compared her songwriting to that of the producers Dr. Luke and Max Martin, whom he referred to as "Swedish pop gods". He also thought the song contained Swift's "peculiar charm": "Her music mixes an almost impersonal professionalism—it's so rigorously crafted it sounds like it has been scientifically engineered in a hit factory—with confessions that are squirmingly intimate and true." In a less enthusiastic review, Jonathon Keefe of Slant Magazine agreed that the lyrics, particularly those in the bridge, made it clear why Swift's music resonated "so strongly with her audience", but he criticized the vocals in the outro as "noticeably, consistently flat by anywhere from a quarter to a half pitch".

Jon Caramanica of The New York Times said "Fifteen" was one of Swift's best-written songs. Prior to its single release, Kate Kiefer of Paste magazine suggested for the song be released as a single from Fearless, adding that she loved it. Aidan Vaziri of San Francisco Chronicle ranked it twelfth on his top 12 singles of 2009 list, commenting, "Damn it if this song isn't too sweet, too vulnerable and just too real to ignore." On a negative side, some critics took issue with the alleged themes of idealized femininity and virginity, interpreting the lyrics mentioning Anderson's disappointment after she "gave everything she had to a boy who changed his mind" as sex-negative and encouraging the idea of submissive femininity.

== Release and commercial performance ==
Following the release of Fearless, on the week ending November 29, 2008, "Fifteen" debuted at number 79 on the Billboard Hot 100 Its appearance, along with six other songs, on the chart tied Swift with Hannah Montana (Miley Cyrus) for the female act to have the most songs charting on the Billboard Hot 100 in the same week, a record later surpassed by Swift herself when she charted 16 songs at once in 2020. It re-entered at number 94 on the week ending October 3, 2009, after its single release.

"Fifteen" was released to US country radio on August 31, 2009, by Big Machine Records. On the week ending December 19, 2009, "Fifteen" reached its peak at number 23 on the Billboard Hot 100, and, on the week ending February 6, 2010, spent its last week at number 40, after 21 weeks on the chart. The song is one of 13 songs from Fearless charted within the top 40 of the Billboard Hot 100, breaking the record for the most top 40 entries from a single album. The single was certified double platinum by the Recording Industry Association of America. As of November 2017, "Fifteen" has sold over 1.5 million copies in the United States.

"Fifteen" debuted at number 41 on Hot Country Songs. It jumped to number 31 in its second week and on the week ending November 7, 2009, it entered the top 10 at number 10. Six weeks later, it reached its peak at number seven on the week ending December 12, 2009. The single became her second single that did not reach the top three of Hot Country Songs since her debut single "Tim McGraw". "Fifteen" also peaked at number 10 on Pop Songs, number 12 on Adult Contemporary, and number 14 on Adult Pop Songs.

On the week ending January 23, 2010, the song peaked at number 19 in Canada. It was certified gold by Music Canada for sales of 40,000 digital downloads. "Fifteen" peaked at number 48 in Australia on the week ending December 13, 2009.

== Music video ==
The music video for "Fifteen" was directed by Roman White, who previously directed Swift's music video "You Belong with Me". White began with the intention of creating a video different than others Swift did in the past. To do so, he believed he needed to set the video outside of high school. White explained, "Well, I think I really wanted this video to kind of be an evolution for Taylor [...] I actually said to her, 'I don't think we should shoot in a high school.' And I don't think she wanted to either." White conceptualized the video's setting by taking into account the literal meaning of the song and transforming into something new. He conceptualized the setting to be a new world where Swift could revisit her memories, as they manifest around her. "Let's take the literal meaning of this song and watch it evolve in front of us ... almost as a memory in your head. And create this world, somewhere you walk in on this desolate desert and you start to sing about all these great memories you have... of everything you love blooming around you, and so we literally grew this garden around her", White said. The world moved from one situation to the next. White decided to annex surreal elements to create a cross between a garden and the heart of the memories. He intertwined Swift's emotions with the growth of the garden. The garden grew when Swift felt happy, but at the sight of pain and negative emotions, clouds appear and the garden dies, which also symbolized Swift's best friend Abigail Anderson's broken heart.

Swift and her best friend Abigail Anderson reliving memories in the music video for "Fifteen"

Swift's friend, Anderson, portrayed herself in the video. The love interests of both Swift and Anderson were cast by Swift after she received images of them via e-mail. The video was filmed in two days. The first day consisted of actors, including Swift and Anderson, filming before a green screen. On the set, White presented Swift with caricature drawings depicting the music video, in order to guide herself. Swift was impressed by Anderson's acting skills, considering her lack of experience, and called it "prolific". On the second day, scenes at a high school were filmed; artificial rain was made. Afterward, White and a team of visual effect artists created the setting. "If you watch just the offline edit of this video, it's just green. It's just Taylor walking around a giant green screen. And to think that every single thing in that video was created is amazing, 'cause a lot of people worked really hard on it", White said. The visual effects team were at work for the video for some time, sometimes staying overnight in the office to produce the video. The direction was to make the video seem "magical". Some of the props used when filming were recreated using digital animation, such as the door and the desks. Because extras were filmed separately, White was meticulous to find the right shots to make the scene more cohesive. White believed the finished product had a sense of innocence.

The video begins with Swift, barefoot and clad in a white sundress, approaching a tall, arched doorway which materializes in the middle of a barren landscape. Swift looks at a photograph of herself and her friend tucked into the arch and, then, passes through the doors. On the other side of the arch, animated flowers and vines grow across the scenes. People and objects from a high school fade in and out of view. Swift walks through the memories and begins to play an acoustic guitar beneath a tree. Afterward, Anderson appears, sitting at a desk before a chalkboard in the field of flowers. Swift sits down beside her and the two begin to whisper and laugh to each other. In the next scene, Swift plays a namesake Taylor brand guitar while Anderson goes on her first date; she kisses her date, but pushes him away when he tries to go further. Her love interest and all surroundings dissolve to show Anderson sitting alone on a stone bench. Swift approaches her and hugs her tightly as the field around them turns dark and stormy. The video then alternates between Swift singing in the rain and hugging her friend. After the landscape deteriorates, the video transitions to reality, where Swift, wearing a black trench coat, stands in the rain, across the street from a high school. Swift then sees a student at the entrance; the two make eye contact and the video concludes. To date, the video has over 171 million views on YouTube.

The music video premiered on October 9, 2009, on CMT. Peter Gicas of E! thought the video was "sweet" and said, "And while the visuals here—Taylor walking in and out of various animated scenes—are certainly nice to look at, they nevertheless take a back seat to the country star's cuteness." Leah Greenblatt of Entertainment Weekly graded the video a B. Greenblatt believed the video was reverential and painterly, but criticized it by saying "Fifteen"'s most powerful lyrics were outdone by the dreamy design. Jocelyn Vena of MTV wrote, "Taylor Swift is 'Fifteen' all over again in the new music video for her song of the same name." At the 2010 MTV Video Music Awards, the video was nominated for the MTV Video Music Award for Best Female Video, but lost to Lady Gaga's video for "Bad Romance" (2009). Annelot Prins, a lecturer in American cultural studies, opined that "Fifteen" is one of Swift's early-career music videos that embodied her "white femininity" persona as "virtuous fairytale princess, who wears elaborate gowns and pristine white dresses". Prins argued that this persona was "built on a highly marketable gendered, raced and classed identity" that typified "post-racial white nostalgia and post-feminist irony".

== Accolades ==
Accolades
Year	Organization	Award	Result	Ref.
2010	BMI Awards	Award-Winning Songs	Won	
2010	BMI Awards	Publisher of the Year	Won	
2010	MTV Video Music Awards	Best Female Video	Nominated	
2010	Teen Choice Awards	Choice Country Song	Won	

== Live performances ==
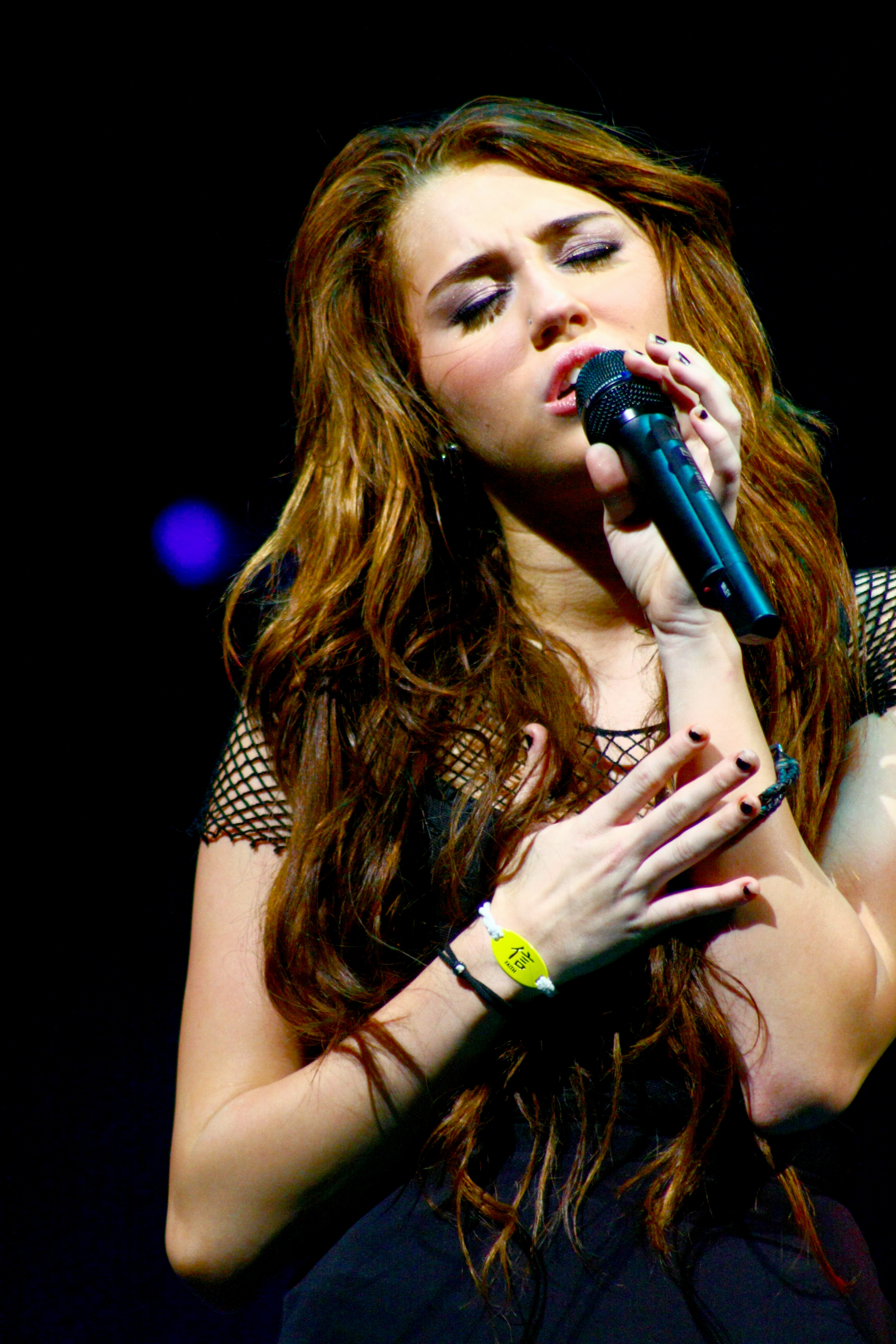
Swift performed "Fifteen" with Miley Cyrus (pictured) at the 2009 Grammy Awards.

Swift first performed "Fifteen", as a duet with the singer Miley Cyrus, at the 51st Annual Grammy Awards. The duo sat on wooden stools for the acoustic performance, with Swift wearing a baggy beige dress layered over a tight black outfit and playing an acoustic guitar. Kate Galloway, an academic in popular music, opined that Swift performed "Fifteen" live with "imperfect" vocals. Galloway wrote that whereas some reviewers had criticized Swift's weak live vocals, her Grammy performance was "beautifully flawed, raw, vulnerable, dissolving the illusionary gauze between the professional musician and the amateur out in the audience", which made her accessible to her audience and invalidated the technical criticisms of her singing. Swift also performed the song at We're All for the Hall, a benefit concert organized by Country Music Hall of Fame and Museum, the 2009 CMA Music Festival, the 2009 V Festival, the Australian charity concert Sydney Sound Relief, and the Country Music Association Awards. In the United Kingdom, Swift performed "Fifteen" on Later... with Jools Holland and The Paul O'Grady Show.

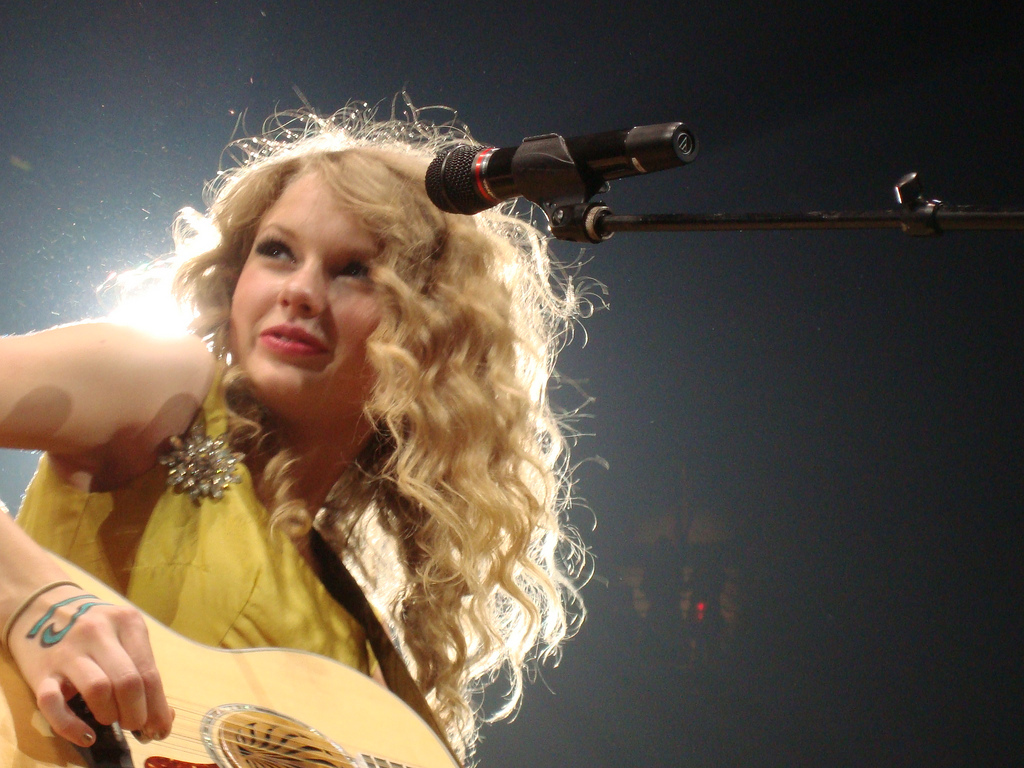
Swift performing "Fifteen" during the Fearless Tour in 2009

Swift performed the song on all venues in 2009 and 2010 of her first headlining concert tour, the Fearless Tour. The performances of "Fifteen" set on a small platform located at the opposite end, parallel to the stage in the arena. Swift, dressed in a pastel sundress, sat on a wooden stool while performing with wooden 12-string acoustic guitar strapped to her shoulder. Nicole Frehsee of Rolling Stone favored Swift's performance of "Tim McGraw" at the August 27, 2009 concert at Madison Square Garden in New York City. Frehsee described the entire concert as an "elaborate spectacle that doesn't slow down, even when the singer hauls her acoustic guitar into the audience to play a sweet, stripped down set of tunes including 'Fifteen'." "Fifteen" served as a performance on the setlist of Swift's second concert tour, the Speak Now World Tour (2011); the performances featured Swift sitting and playing an acoustic guitar, wearing a blue cocktail dress.

Swift performed the song during her 1989 World Tour in place of "You Are in Love" on selected dates, such as the shows in Indianapolis and Atlanta. She also performed the acoustic version of the song on Formula 1 Grand Prix on October 22, 2016, at Austin, Texas. The song was performed on her Reputation Stadium Tour at the second show in London in honor of the concert being the fifteenth show of the tour. On the May 6, 2023, Nashville show of the Eras Tour, Swift sang "Fifteen" in dedication to Anderson who was in attendance. She performed it again as part of a mashup with her song "You're on Your Own, Kid" (2022) on the tour's March 7, 2024, Singapore and June 2, 2024, Lyon shows.

== @15 ==
Swift partnered with electronics retailer Best Buy for @15, a program that allowed teens to help decide how Best Buy's "@15 Fund" would be distributed among various charities. Swift taped a Public Service Announcement (PSA), called a "Teen Service Announcement" by Best Buy, for @15. Within the PSA, which was released on February 9, 2009, scenes of Swift reminiscing on high school and encouraging originality and uniqueness were inter-cut with scenes of her singing "Fifteen". In June 2009, @15 became a partner for Swift's Fearless Tour. The announcement was shown at each stop during the North American leg of the tour. In fifteen tour stops, @15 donated forty concert tickets and a guitar autographed by Swift to local teen-oriented charity groups, such as chapters of Boys & Girls Clubs of America and Big Brothers Big Sisters.

== Personnel ==
Adapted from the liner notes of Fearless

- Taylor Swift – vocals, songwriter, producer
- Nathan Chapman – producer
- Drew Bollman – assistant mixer
- Chad Carlson – recording engineer
- Justin Niebank – mixer

== Charts ==
=== Weekly charts ===
Weekly chart performance
Chart (2009–2010)	Peak position
Australia (ARIA)	48
Canada Hot 100 (Billboard)	19
Canada AC (Billboard)	21
Canada CHR/Top 40 (Billboard)	10
Canada Country (Billboard)	4
Canada Hot AC (Billboard)	8
Mexico Ingles Airplay (Billboard)	35
US Billboard Hot 100	23
US Adult Contemporary (Billboard)	12
US Adult Pop Airplay (Billboard)	16
US Hot Country Songs (Billboard)	7
US Pop Airplay (Billboard)	10
US Pop 100 (Billboard)	55

=== Year-end charts ===
Year-end chart performance
Chart (2010)	Position
US Adult Contemporary (Billboard)	28

== Certifications ==
Certifications and sales
Region	Certification	Certified units/sales
Australia (ARIA)	Platinum	70,000^{‡}
Canada (Music Canada)	Gold	40,000^{*}
New Zealand (RMNZ)	Gold	15,000^{‡}
United States (RIAA)	2× Platinum	2,000,000^{‡}
^{*} Sales figures based on certification alone.^{‡} Sales+streaming figures based on certification alone.

== "Fifteen (Taylor's Version)" ==
"Fifteen (Taylor's Version)"

Song by Taylor Swift

from the album Fearless (Taylor's Version)
- Released: April 9, 2021
- Studio: Black Bird; Prime Recording (Nashville, Tennessee)
- Length: 4:54
- Label: Republic
- Songwriter: Taylor Swift
- Producers: Taylor Swift; Christopher Rowe

Lyric video
- "Fifteen (Taylor's Version)" on YouTube

"Fifteen (Taylor's Version)" is the re-recorded version of "Fifteen" by the American singer-songwriter Taylor Swift. The track is written by Swift and produced by Swift and Christopher Rowe. It was released on April 9, 2021, through Republic Records, as the second track on Fearless (Taylor's Version), the re-recording of Fearless. An official lyric video of the re-recording was released to YouTube.

"Fifteen (Taylor's Version)" was well received by critics, who praised Swift's more mature vocals as adding depth to the song. Upon the album's release, the song charted in Australia, Canada, and the United States, and appeared in the top 20 of the Hot Country Songs chart.

=== Background ===
On February 11, 2021, Swift announced a re-recording of "Fifteen", titled "Fifteen (Taylor's Version)", as part of Fearless (Taylor's Version), the re-recorded version of Fearless. The album was released on April 9, 2021.

=== Critical reception ===
Critics generally praised "Fifteen (Taylor's Version)". NME's Hannah Mylrea called it one of Swift's most moving songs, while also remarking that lines such as "Back then I swore I was gonna marry him someday / But I realised some bigger dreams of mine" cut deeper 10 years later. Alexandra Pollard of The Independent expressed similar sentiments, saying that there was "an added layer" to "Fifteen (Taylor's Version)" and songs like it on the album. Writing for Gigwise, Kelsey Barnes wrote that "the small vocal changes in 'Fifteen (Taylor's Version)' which means so much more when you think about her now, at 31, and all of the fans that have grown up alongside her since then", saying that Swift's age could be heard and felt "in the best way".

=== Personnel ===
Credits are adapted from the liner notes of Fearless (Taylor's Version).

- Taylor Swift - Lead vocals, songwriting, executive producer, production
- Mike Meadows - Acoustic guitar, mandolin
- Caitlin Evanson - Background vocals
- Paul Sidoti - Electric guitar
- Amos Heller - Bass
- Matt Billingslea - Drums
- Max Bernstein - Electric guitar
- Jonathan Yudkin - Cello
- Christopher Rowe - Production, recording engineering, background vocals
- Randy Merrill - Mastering
- Serban Ghenea - Mixing
- John Hanes - Engineer
- David Payne - Recording engineering

=== Charts ===
Chart performance
Chart (2021)	Peak position
Australia (ARIA)	72
Canada Hot 100 (Billboard)	56
Global 200 (Billboard)	84
New Zealand Hot Singles (RMNZ)	7
US Billboard Hot 100	88
US Hot Country Songs (Billboard)	20
