= Hey Stephen =

2008 song by Taylor Swift

Song by Taylor Swift

from the album Fearless
- Released: November 11, 2008
- Genre: Country pop; folk-pop; teen pop
- Length: 4:14
- Label: Big Machine
- Songwriter: Taylor Swift
- Producers: Taylor Swift; Nathan Chapman

Audio video
- "Hey Stephen" on YouTube

"Hey Stephen (Taylor's Version)"

Song by Taylor Swift

from the album Fearless (Taylor's Version)
- Released: April 9, 2021
- Studio: Black Bird; Prime Recording; (Nashville)
- Length: 4:14
- Label: Republic
- Songwriter: Taylor Swift
- Producers: Taylor Swift; Christopher Rowe

Lyric video
- "Hey Stephen (Taylor's Version)" on YouTube

"Hey Stephen" is a song written and recorded by the American singer-songwriter Taylor Swift for her second studio album, Fearless (2008). It is a country pop, folk-pop, and teen pop song about an unrequited love, inspired by a real-life infatuation. Produced by Swift and Nathan Chapman, "Hey Stephen" features drums inspired by girl group records, an upright bass that propels its groove, and a subdued Hammond B-3 organ. In reviews of Fearless, critics who picked "Hey Stephen" as an album highlight praised its melody and earnest lyrics about adolescent feelings. The song peaked at number 94 on the US Billboard Hot 100 and was certified gold by the Recording Industry Association of America (RIAA).

Swift included "Hey Stephen" in the set list of her first headlining tour, the Fearless Tour (2009–2010). Following the 2019 dispute regarding the ownership of Swift's back catalog, she re-recorded the song as "Hey Stephen (Taylor's Version)" for her re-recorded album Fearless (Taylor's Version) (2021). "Hey Stephen (Taylor's Version)" charted in Australia and Canada. In retrospective rankings, some reviewers remained positive but others regarded the track as generic.

== Background and writing ==
Taylor Swift wrote songs for her second studio album, Fearless, while touring as an opening act for other country musicians to promote her first album Taylor Swift during 2007–2008, when she was 17–18 years old. Continuing the romantic themes of her first album, Swift wrote songs about love and personal experiences from the perspective of a teenage girl to ensure her fans could relate to Fearless. To this extent, Swift said that nearly every album track had a "face" that she associated with it. The end product is a collection of songs about the challenges of love with prominent high-school and fairy-tale lyrical imagery. Swift and the producer Nathan Chapman recorded over 50 songs for Fearless, and "Hey Stephen" was one of the 13 tracks that made the final cut. They produced the track, and Justin Niebank mixed it at Blackbird Studio in Nashville. In the album liner notes, the secret message for the song is "Love and Theft", referencing the duo Love and Theft that opened shows for her in 2008. (Note: The "secret messages" of Swift's songs are decoded by arranging certain capitalized letters in each song's lyrics, printed in the album booklet, in the order they appear to spell out a certain word or phrase.)

When asked by Rolling Stone's Austin Scaggs if Stephen was a real person, Swift replied, "I have no issue with naming names. My personal goal is for my songs to be so detailed that the guy the song is written about knows it's about him." The song's inspiration was Love and Theft's member Stephen Barker Liles, with whom she had had a friendly relationship. After Fearless was released, Swift texted him about the song. She recalled it was "fun" to put a personal confession on the album, which she was "going to have to deal with", and it was "interesting" to know what Liles had to say about it. Liles spoke to The Boot (2009): "I was very relieved when it turned out to be a nice song, and it's actually one of the nicest things anybody's ever done for me." He wrote "Try to Make It Anyway" as an answer song to Swift when they were touring together and released it for download and streaming in 2011.

== Releases ==
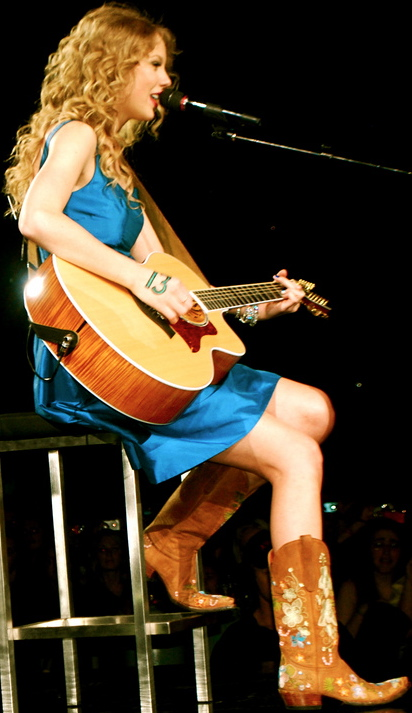
Swift performed "Hey Stephen" on her Fearless Tour in 2009–2010.

"Hey Stephen" was released as an album cut on Fearless, on November 11, 2008, by Big Machine Records. It entered and peaked at number 94 on the US Billboard Hot 100 chart dated November 29, 2008. The Recording Industry Association of America (RIAA) certified the song gold, denoting 500,000 units based on sales and streaming. Swift performed the track live at her Australian concert debut at the Tivoli in Brisbane on March 5, 2009. "Hey Stephen" was part of the mid-show acoustic session on Swift's first headlining tour, the Fearless Tour (2009–2010). Midway through the performance, Swift would go down the aisle to greet and hug her fans. She occasionally performed "Hey Stephen" on her later tours. She sang the track at the September 18, 2018, St. Louis show of the Reputation Stadium Tour. On the Eras Tour, she performed "Hey Stephen" at the May 14, 2023, show in Philadelphia, and the May 11, 2024, show in Paris.

After signing a new contract with Republic Records, Swift began re-recording her first six studio albums in November 2020. The decision followed a public 2019 dispute between Swift and the talent manager Scooter Braun, who acquired Big Machine Records, including the masters of Swift's albums which the label had released. By re-recording the albums, Swift had full ownership of the new masters, which enabled her to control the licensing of her songs for commercial use and therefore substituted the Big Machine–owned masters. Swift and Christopher Rowe produced the re-recorded track, which was recorded by David Payne at Black Bird and Prime Recording Studios in Nashville. Rowe recorded Swift's lead vocals at her home studio in London, and Serban Ghenea mixed the track at MixStar Studios in Virginia Beach, Virginia.

The re-recording of "Hey Stephen", subtitled "Taylor's Version", was released as part of Fearless's re-recording, Fearless (Taylor's Version). Swift released a snippet of "Hey Stephen (Taylor's Version)" on her Twitter account on April 8, 2021, one day before Republic Records released Fearless (Taylor's Version). "Hey Stephen (Taylor's Version)" charted in Australia (86) and Canada (68). It peaked at number 105 on the Billboard Global 200. In the United States, "Hey Stephen (Taylor's Version)" peaked at number one on Bubbling Under Hot 100 and number 28 on Billboard's Hot Country Songs chart.

== Music and lyrics ==
"Hey Stephen"
"Hey Stephen" is a country pop, folk-pop, and teen pop song that features girl group-influenced drums and vocals, an upright bass that propels its groove, and a subdued Hammond B-3.

At 4 minutes and 14 seconds long, "Hey Stephen" is a country pop, folk-pop, and teen pop song. It features a minimalistic production that critics described as "smooth" and "playful". (Note: Attributed to Somville & Benoit 2025, p. 67, Larry Rodgers for The Arizona Republic, and Jonathan Keefe for Slant Magazine) The track begins with a drum beat that Rob Sheffield of Rolling Stone found reminiscent of the Ronettes' "Be My Baby" (1963), and Maria Sherman of NPR Music said it evoked classic Motown girl-group records. After the first drum beat, Swift hums. The song progresses with an arrangement driven by strummed gut string guitars, and a groove propelled by an upright bass.

From the first refrain, the arrangement includes a subdued Hammond B-3 organ that evokes Southern soul. Swift chuckles before the final refrain and hums with ad-libs as finger snaps lead towards the end. In the original 2008 song, the finger snaps are credited to Martina McBride's children and their friends, who visited Swift one day when she was at the recording studio of McBride's husband, John. The re-recorded "Hey Stephen (Taylor's Version)" features the same arrangement, which led to The New York Times' Joe Coscarelli commenting it sounded "more remastered than rerecorded". Michael A. Lee, a professor in commercial music, identified some minor changes: Swift's voice is richer and less breathy, and the cymbals in the break are louder.

The lyrics are about an unrequited love for a seemingly out-of-reach boy. The title character is a boy in whom "all the girls" are interested, and although they toss stones at his window to get his attention, Swift's character tells Stephen that she is the only one "waiting there even when it's cold". She confesses to him that she wants to kiss him because of his angelic looks and lists several reasons why he should date her. In the bridge, Swift's character mentions the reason why Stephen should choose her over other girls: "All those other girls, well they're beautiful, but would they write a song for you?" Ken Tucker found this lyric to showcase Swift's "confident sense of humor", and the musicologist James E. Perone commented that it aligned Swift with the 1970s singer-songwriter tradition of mentioning their songwriting profession in their own works.

"Hey Stephen" incorporates some lyrical motifs that recur in many of Swift's other songs, such as rain ("Can't help it if I wanna kiss you in the rain so") (Note: This imagery features on songs such as "Fearless" ("There's something 'bout the way the street looks when it just rained"), "Forever & Always" ("It rains when you're here and it rains when you're gone"), and "Sparks Fly" ("Drop everything now/ Meet me in the pouring rain").) and waiting for somebody by the window. (Note: This imagery features on songs such as "Our Song", "Love Story", and "Come In with the Rain".) At one point, Swift sings, "Hey Stephen, why are people always leaving/ I think you and I should stay the same." The biographer Liv Spencer attributed this lyric to the impact of Swift's touring that "sometimes means too many goodbyes". In a 2021 article for Gigwise, Kelsey Barnes said "Hey Stephen" was an example of Swift's early songwriting: the track reflected her desire to be "seen, understood, and loved by others", a recurring theme on many of her later songs. For Barnes, it offered a glimpse into Swift's personal life before it became sensationalized in the press. Annie Zaleski thought that although the lyrics portrayed longing, the song turned out "rather sanguine" thanks to the "swirling" Hammond organ and Swift's "conspiratorial" vocals.

== Critical reception ==
In album reviews of Fearless, many critics picked "Hey Stephen" as a highlight. (Note: Attributed to reviews by Darryl Sterdan for The Edmonton Sun, Joe Breen for The Irish Times, and Rob Sheffield for Blender) They positively remarked how "Hey Stephen" portrays universal teenage feelings towards love and infatuation (Note: Attributed to reviews by Craig S. Semon for the Telegram & Gazette, Katie Hubbard for The Charleston Gazette, and Thomas Kintner for the Hartford Courant)—Craig S. Semon of the Telegram & Gazette said, "Swift's loose and playful confession is enough to make anybody blush." Others praised Swift's songwriting for creating what they deemed a catchy melody. (Note: Attributed to reviews by Hubbard, Ash Amanda for the Edmonton Journal, and Chris Richards for The Washington Post) Larry Rodgers in The Arizona Republic wrote the track was "hummable pop" and Chris Richards in The Washington Post complimented how the track "beams its irresistible smile before permanently lodging itself in your hippocampus". Jody Rosen in a review for Rolling Stone selected the song as an example of Swift's songwriting that highlighted her "peculiar charm" on Fearless: "Her music mixes an almost impersonal professionalism—it's so rigorously crafted it sounds like it has been scientifically engineered in a hit factory—with confessions that are squirmingly intimate and true." In Slant Magazine, Jonathan Keefe picked "Hey Stephen" as one of the album's most charming cuts and praised the emotional sentiments that resonated with Swift's main audience of teenagers, but he felt it lacked the sophistication that others credited her with.

In retrospective reviews of the song, Sheffield and Nate Jones from Vulture complimented its melody. The former highlighted its "classic girl-group flourishes" and wrote that he enjoyed Swift's humming, and the latter opined that the track showcased how "Swift is in the zone as a writer, performer, and producer". Jon Bream of the Star Tribune described "Hey Stephen" as "perfect high school pop" and picked it as a highlight on Fearless. Reviewing the re-recorded "Hey Stephen (Taylor's Version)", Exclaim!'s Heather Taylor-Singh said it retained the original's earnest emotion and The Line of Best Fit's Ross Horton wrote it remained "superb" as it was before. Some others were not as complimentary. Hazel Cills of Pitchfork said the track's "extreme specificity", which felt like "a copy of Swift's yearbook we're somehow privy to", was too much for an already personal album. Mary Siroky in Consequence called "Hey Stephen" a catchy song but wrote its "repetitive melody" and "cliched" lyrical motifs make it the album's least compelling. For Perone, although the lyrics are conventional and generic, "Swift's performance and her melodic writing make the song enjoyable and engaging anyway".

== Personnel ==
"Hey Stephen" (2008)

- Taylor Swift – vocals, writer, producer
- Nathan Chapman – producer
- Drew Bollman – assistant mixer
- Chad Carlson – recording engineer
- Justin Niebank – mixer
- Andrew Bowers – finger snaps
- Burrus Cox – finger snaps
- Carolyn Cooper – finger snaps
- Lauren Elcan – finger snaps
- Delaney McBride – finger snaps
- Emma McBride – finger snaps
- Nicholas Brown – instruments

"Hey Stephen (Taylor's Version)" (2021)

- Taylor Swift – lead vocals, writer, producer
- Christopher Rowe – vocal recording, producer
- Max Bernstein – vibraphone
- Matt Billingslea – drums, finger snaps
- Caitlin Evanson – background vocals
- Derek Garten – additional engineer
- Serban Ghenea – mixing
- John Hanes – engineer
- Amos Heller – bass guitar
- Mike Meadows – acoustic guitar, Hammond B3, finger snaps, background vocals
- David Payne – recording
- Lowell Reynolds – assistant recording engineer
- Jonathan Yudkin – fiddle, fiddle recording

== Charts ==
=== "Hey Stephen" ===
Chart performance
| Chart (2008) | Peak position |
|---|---|
| US Billboard Hot 100 | 94 |

=== "Hey Stephen (Taylor's Version)" ===
Chart performance
| Chart (2021) | Peak position |
|---|---|
| Australia (ARIA) | 86 |
| Canada Hot 100 (Billboard) | 68 |
| Global 200 (Billboard) | 105 |
| US Bubbling Under Hot 100 (Billboard) | 1 |
| US Hot Country Songs (Billboard) | 28 |

== Certification ==
Certification
| Region | Certification | Certified units/sales |
|---|---|---|
| United States (RIAA) | Gold | 500,000^{‡} |
^{‡} Sales+streaming figures based on certification alone.
