= So Fresh =

Australian compilation album series

So Fresh: The Hits of Spring 2000 was the first album in the So Fresh series. The first track is "It's My Life" by Bon Jovi.

So Fresh: The Hits of Summer 2003 + The Biggest Hits of 2002 is the highest certified So Fresh album, having shipped six-times platinum (over 420,000 copies) within two months of its release.

So Fresh is an Australian compilation album series. It began in 2000, as a joint venture from Sony, BMG (later merged into Sony) and Universal, replacing the prior Hit Machine series, which ran from 1993 to 2000. From 2000 until 2023, So Fresh albums were released four times per year, named after each season (Summer, Autumn, Winter and Spring), consisting of current hit songs from artists signed to Sony, BMG or Universal. In March 2024, So Fresh announced that the series would change to a single annual edition; So Fresh: Best of 2024 was released in November 2024.

So Fresh albums have been highly successful in Australia. Every edition from Spring 2000 to Winter 2016 was certified at least platinum (for over 70,000 copies shipped or sold), (Note: See discography section for citations.) and every year from 2001–2011, 2014–2015 and 2017–2024, the year's highest selling compilation in Australia has been a So Fresh album. As of Summer 2024, all 94 seasonal So Fresh albums have reached number one on the ARIA Compilations Chart.

Various other So Fresh spin-off albums have also been released, including an annual Christmas compilation each year from 2002 to 2019, and several DVD releases. From September 2003 until approximately November 2006, So Fresh also ran a weekly TV show on the Nine Network, featuring "music clips, interviews [and] the ARIA top 10", hosted by Jules Lund (replaced by David Whitehill circa early 2004) and Elysia Pratt.

== Discography ==
=== Main series ===
Typically, So Fresh's Autumn, Winter and Spring releases are a single CD, while the Summer releases are a two-CD set, mixing current hits with the "biggest hits" or "best" of the past year. From Autumn 2008 to Autumn 2016, the Autumn, Winter and Spring releases included a "bonus DVD" with music videos for selected songs from the CD (from Winter 2014 onwards, separate CD-only versions were also released). Since Summer 2015, the Summer albums have been released in both double-disc versions, and single-disc versions without the "best of".

Title	Release date	Peak chart position (Note: Peak position on the ARIA Compilations Chart (various-artists compilations are not eligible for the regular albums chart).)	Certification (Note: Certification by the Australian Recording Industry Association.)
So Fresh: The Hits of Spring 2000	4 September 2000	1	Platinum
So Fresh: The Hits of Summer 2001 + The Biggest Hits of 2000	27 November 2000	1	4× Platinum
So Fresh: The Hits of Autumn 2001	2 April 2001	1	Platinum
So Fresh: The Hits of Winter 2001	18 June 2001	1	2× Platinum
So Fresh: The Hits of Spring 2001	17 September 2001	1	5× Platinum
So Fresh: The Hits of Summer 2002 + The Biggest Hits of 2001	3 December 2001	1	5× Platinum
So Fresh: The Hits of Autumn 2002	25 March 2002	1	3× Platinum
So Fresh: The Hits of Winter 2002	17 June 2002	1	3× Platinum
So Fresh: The Hits of Spring 2002	16 September 2002	1	4× Platinum
So Fresh: The Hits of Summer 2003 + The Biggest Hits of 2002	25 November 2002	1	6× Platinum
So Fresh: The Hits of Autumn 2003	31 March 2003	1	4× Platinum
So Fresh: The Hits of Winter 2003	30 June 2003	1	2× Platinum
So Fresh: The Hits of Spring 2003	15 September 2003	1	3× Platinum
So Fresh: The Hits of Summer 2004 + The Biggest Hits of 2003	1 December 2003	1	5× Platinum
So Fresh: The Hits of Autumn 2004	29 March 2004	1	3× Platinum
So Fresh: The Hits of Winter 2004	21 June 2004	1	4× Platinum
So Fresh: The Hits of Spring 2004	13 September 2004	1	2× Platinum
So Fresh: The Hits of Summer 2005 + The Biggest Hits of 2004	22 November 2004	1	5× Platinum
So Fresh: The Hits of Autumn 2005	28 March 2005	1	2× Platinum
So Fresh: The Hits of Winter 2005	13 June 2005	1	2× Platinum
So Fresh: The Hits of Spring 2005	19 September 2005	1	2× Platinum
So Fresh: The Hits of Summer 2006 + The Best of 2005	28 November 2005	1	5× Platinum
So Fresh: The Hits of Autumn 2006	27 March 2006	1	2× Platinum
So Fresh: The Hits of Winter 2006	12 June 2006	1	2× Platinum
So Fresh: The Hits of Spring 2006	18 September 2006	1	2× Platinum
So Fresh: The Hits of Summer 2007 + The Best of 2006	27 November 2006	1	5× Platinum
So Fresh: The Hits of Autumn 2007	26 March 2007	1	Platinum
So Fresh: The Hits of Winter 2007	16 June 2007	1	2× Platinum
So Fresh: The Hits of Spring 2007	8 September 2007	1	2× Platinum
So Fresh: The Hits of Summer 2008 + The Best of 2007	24 November 2007	1	3× Platinum
So Fresh: The Hits of Autumn 2008	29 March 2008	1	3× Platinum
So Fresh: The Hits of Winter 2008	21 June 2008	1	2× Platinum
So Fresh: The Hits of Spring 2008	13 September 2008	1	2× Platinum
So Fresh: The Hits of Summer 2009 + The Best of 2008	28 November 2008	1	4× Platinum
So Fresh: The Hits of Autumn 2009	27 March 2009	1	2× Platinum
So Fresh: The Hits of Winter 2009	19 June 2009	1	Platinum
So Fresh: The Hits of Spring 2009	11 September 2009	1	2× Platinum
So Fresh: The Hits of Summer 2010 + The Best of 2009	20 November 2009	1	3× Platinum
So Fresh: The Hits of Autumn 2010	19 March 2010	1	Platinum
So Fresh: The Hits of Winter 2010	18 June 2010	1	Platinum
So Fresh: The Hits of Spring 2010	10 September 2010	1	Platinum
So Fresh: The Hits of Summer 2011 + The Best of 2010	19 November 2010	1	3× Platinum
So Fresh: The Hits of Autumn 2011	18 March 2011	1	Platinum
So Fresh: The Hits of Winter 2011	17 June 2011	1	Platinum
So Fresh: The Hits of Spring 2011	9 September 2011	1	Platinum
So Fresh: The Hits of Summer 2012 + The Best of 2011	18 November 2011	1	2× Platinum
So Fresh: The Hits of Autumn 2012	16 March 2012	1	Platinum
So Fresh: The Hits of Winter 2012	15 June 2012	1	Platinum
So Fresh: The Hits of Spring 2012	14 September 2012	1	Platinum
So Fresh: The Hits of Summer 2013 + The Best of 2012	23 November 2012	1	2× Platinum
So Fresh: The Hits of Autumn 2013	29 March 2013	1	Platinum
So Fresh: The Hits of Winter 2013	21 June 2013	1	Platinum
So Fresh: The Hits of Spring 2013	13 September 2013	1	Platinum
So Fresh: The Hits of Summer 2014 + The Best of 2013	22 November 2013	1	2× Platinum
So Fresh: The Hits of Autumn 2014	28 March 2014	1	Platinum
So Fresh: The Hits of Winter 2014	13 June 2014	1	Platinum
So Fresh: The Hits of Spring 2014	12 September 2014	1	Platinum
So Fresh: The Hits of Summer 2015 + The Best of 2014	28 November 2014	1 (Note: The double-disc So Fresh: The Hits of Summer 2015 + The Best of 2014 and single-disc So Fresh: The Hits of Summer 2015 charted separately on the ARIA Compilations Chart in their first week, with the former debuting at number one and the latter at number two. Only one entry for them appeared on the chart from the following week onwards, suggesting their sales were likely combined thereafter.)	2× Platinum
So Fresh: The Hits of Autumn 2015	20 March 2015	1	Platinum
So Fresh: The Hits of Winter 2015	19 June 2015	1	Platinum
So Fresh: The Hits of Spring 2015	11 September 2015	1	Platinum
So Fresh: The Hits of Summer 2016 + The Best of 2015	27 November 2015	1	Platinum
So Fresh: The Hits of Autumn 2016	18 March 2016	1	Platinum
So Fresh: The Hits of Winter 2016	17 June 2016	1	Platinum
So Fresh: The Hits of Spring 2016	9 September 2016	1	Gold
So Fresh: The Hits of Summer 2017 + The Best of 2016	25 November 2016	1	—
So Fresh: The Hits of Autumn 2017	24 March 2017	1	—
So Fresh: The Hits of Winter 2017	16 June 2017	1	—
So Fresh: The Hits of Spring 2017	8 September 2017	1	—
So Fresh: The Hits of Summer 2018 + The Best of 2017	24 November 2017	1	Platinum
So Fresh: The Hits of Autumn 2018	23 March 2018	1	Gold
So Fresh: The Hits of Winter 2018	15 June 2018	1	Gold
So Fresh: The Hits of Spring 2018	21 September 2018	1	—
So Fresh: The Hits of Summer 2019 + The Best of 2018	23 November 2018	1	Gold
So Fresh: The Hits of Autumn 2019	22 March 2019	1	—
So Fresh: The Hits of Winter 2019	21 June 2019	1	—
So Fresh: The Hits of Spring 2019	20 September 2019	1	—
So Fresh: The Hits of Summer 2020 + The Best of 2019	22 November 2019	1	—
So Fresh: The Hits of Autumn 2020	20 March 2020	1	—
So Fresh: The Hits of Winter 2020	17 July 2020	1	—
So Fresh: The Hits of Spring 2020	16 October 2020	1	—
So Fresh: The Hits of Summer 2021 + The Best of 2020	4 December 2020	1	—
So Fresh: The Hits of Autumn 2021	26 March 2021	1	—
So Fresh: The Hits of Winter 2021	25 June 2021	1	—
So Fresh: The Hits of Spring 2021	24 September 2021	1	—
So Fresh: The Hits of Summer 2022 + The Best of 2021	3 December 2021	1	—
So Fresh: The Hits of Autumn 2022	1 April 2022	1	—
So Fresh: The Hits of Winter 2022	24 June 2022	1	—
So Fresh: The Hits of Spring 2022	16 September 2022	1	—
So Fresh: The Hits of Summer 2023 + The Best of 2022	2 December 2022	1	—
So Fresh: The Hits of Autumn 2023	21 April 2023	1	—
So Fresh: The Hits of Winter 2023	30 June 2023	1	—
So Fresh: The Hits of Spring 2023	29 September 2023	1	—
So Fresh: The Hits of Summer 2024 + The Best of 2023	8 December 2023	1	—
So Fresh: Best of 2024	29 November 2024	1	—
So Fresh: Best of 2025	27 November 2025	1	

=== Christmas releases ===
Title	Release date	Peak chart position	Certification
So Fresh: Christmas Songs from Past to Present	11 November 2002	6	Gold
So Fresh Presents Songs for Christmas	10 November 2003	4	Gold
So Fresh Presents Songs for Christmas 2004	22 November 2004	4	—
So Fresh: Songs for Christmas 2005	28 November 2005	4	Gold
So Fresh: Songs for Christmas 2006	4 November 2006	3	Gold
So Fresh: Songs for Christmas 2007	17 November 2007	4	Gold
So Fresh: Songs for Christmas 2008	7 November 2008	5	Gold
So Fresh: Songs for Christmas 2009	13 November 2009	3	Gold
So Fresh: Songs for Christmas 2010	12 November 2010	3	Gold
So Fresh: Songs for Christmas 2011	18 November 2011	3	Gold
So Fresh: Songs for Christmas 2012	9 November 2012	2	Gold
So Fresh: Songs for Christmas 2013	8 November 2013	2	Gold
So Fresh: Songs for Christmas 2014	14 November 2014	4	—
So Fresh: Songs for Christmas 2015	6 November 2015	5	—
So Fresh: Songs for Christmas 2016	4 November 2016	2	—
So Fresh: Songs for Christmas 2017	3 November 2017	2	—
So Fresh: The Best of Christmas	9 November 2018	2	—
So Fresh: Best Ever Christmas	8 November 2019	2	—

=== Other CD releases ===
Title	Release date	Peak chart positions		Certification
Title	Release date	Comp.	Dance (Note: Peak position on the ARIA Dance Albums Chart (which does allow various-artists compilations).)	Certification
So Fresh: The #1 Hits	17 May 2008	2	—N/a	Gold
So Fresh: The Top 10s 1999–2008	10 April 2009	9	—N/a	—
So Fresh: A Decade of Hits 2001–2010 Vol. 2	13 May 2011	5	—N/a	—
So Fresh: Dance	10 August 2012	1	—N/a (Note: The first So Fresh: Dance was not included on the ARIA Dance Albums Chart.)	Gold
So Fresh: Dance 2013	10 May 2013	2	2	—
So Fresh: Dance 2014	23 May 2014	2	1	—
So Fresh: Dance 2015	31 July 2015	4	1	—
So Fresh: 15 Years of the Greatest Hits	20 November 2015	3	—N/a	Gold
So Fresh: Dance 2016	29 July 2016	5	3	—
So Fresh: Greatest Hits of the '90s	18 November 2016	3	—N/a	—
So Fresh: Greatest Hits of the '80s	27 October 2017	2	—N/a	—
So Fresh: The Best Ever (20th Anniversary Edition)	20 November 2020	1	—N/a	—

=== DVD releases ===
Title	Release date	Peak chart position (Note: Peak position on the ARIA Music DVD Chart.)	Certification
So Fresh: ...The Story So Far	c. Oct–Dec 2001	—	—
So Fresh: The Story Continues... 2002	25 November 2002	7	—
So Fresh: 2003 Volume 1	30 June 2003	2	—
So Fresh: 2003 Volume 2	1 December 2003	10	Platinum
So Fresh: 2004 Volume 1	21 June 2004	1	—
So Fresh: 2004 Volume 2	22 November 2004	3	—
So Fresh: The Hits of 2005 Volume 1	13 June 2005	6	Gold
