= So Fresh: The Hits of Winter 2001 =

Compilation album by Various artists
- Released: June 18, 2001
- Genre: Pop
- Length: 77:17
- Label: Sony BMG Music Entertainment

So Fresh chronology
So Fresh: The Hits of Autumn 2001 (2001)	So Fresh: The Hits of Winter 2001 (2001)	So Fresh: The Hits of Spring 2001 (2001)

So Fresh: The Hits of Winter 2001 is a compilation of songs that were popular in Australia in winter 2001.

== Track listing ==
1. Nelly Furtado – "I'm Like a Bird" (4:03)
2. Lil' Bow Wow – "Bow Wow (That's My Name)" (3:23)
3. Limp Bizkit – "Rollin'" (3:35)
4. Outkast – "Ms. Jackson" (4:03)
5. Destiny's Child – "Survivor" (4:01)
6. Jennifer Lopez – "Love Don't Cost a Thing" (3:42)
7. Craig David – "7 Days" (3:56)
8. 3LW – "No More (Baby I'ma Do Right)" (3:31)
9. ATC – "Around The World (La La La La La)" (3:36)
10. Leah Haywood – "Takin' Back What's Mine" (3:40)
11. Ronan Keating – "Lovin' Each Day" (3:32)
12. Human Nature – "When We Were Young" (3:27)
13. Nelly – "E.I." (4:15)
14. Joy Enriquez – "Tell Me How You Feel" (4:06)
15. Pink – "You Make Me Sick" (4:06)
16. Bon Jovi – "Thank You For Loving Me" (5:09)
17. soulDecision – "Ooh It's Kinda Crazy" (4:20)
18. Tony Lee Scott – "Take Me Away" (3:05)
19. K-Ci & JoJo – "Crazy" (4:21)
20. Westlife – "I Lay My Love on You" (3:32)

== Charts ==
Year	Chart	Peak position	Certification
2001	ARIA Compilations Chart	1	2× Platinum
