= So Fresh: The Hits of Summer 2002 =

So Fresh: The Hits of Summer 2002 plus the Biggest Hits of 2001

Compilation album by Various artists
- Released: 3 December 2001
- Length: 73:00 (CD 1); 76:14 (CD 2)
- Label: Sony BMG

So Fresh chronology
So Fresh: The Hits of Spring 2001 (2001)	So Fresh: The Hits of Summer 2002 plus the Biggest Hits of 2001 (2001)	So Fresh: The Hits of Autumn 2002 (2002)

So Fresh: The Hits of Summer 2002 is a various artists compilation album. It was released on 3 December 2001.

== Track listing ==
=== CD 1 ===
1. Alien Ant Farm – "Smooth Criminal" (3:28)
2. Eve featuring Gwen Stefani – "Let Me Blow Ya Mind" (3:47)
3. City High – "What Would You Do?" (2:56)
4. Afroman – "Because I Got High" (3:20)
5. Gabrielle – "Out of Reach" (Architects Radio Edit) (3:38)
6. Kurupt – "It's Over" (3:33)
7. Nikki Webster – "Strawberry Kisses" (3:32)
8. Five – "Let's Dance" (3:37)
9. Mademoiselle – "Do You Love Me?" (3:14)
10. Nelly Furtado – "Turn Off the Light" (3:38)
11. U2 – "Elevation" (3:37)
12. Westlife – "When You're Looking Like That" (3:53)
13. Sara-Marie and Sirens – "I'm So Excited (The Bum Dance)" (4:04)
14. Destiny's Child – "Emotion" (3:57)
15. Joanne – "I Don't Know" (3:21)
16. Jamiroquai – "Little L" (3:58)
17. Jennifer Lopez – "Ain't It Funny" (4:04)
18. Mandy Moore – "Crush" (3:56)
19. Jessica Simpson – "Irresistible" (3:13)
20. Bob the Builder – "Mambo No. 5" (3:12)

=== CD 2 ===
1. Eminem featuring Dido – "Stan" (5:32)
2. Outkast – "Ms. Jackson" (4:03)
3. Mýa – "Case of the Ex" (3:52)
4. Leah Haywood – "Summer of Love" (3:05)
5. Selwyn – "Buggin' Me" (3:31)
6. S Club 7 – "Don't Stop Movin'" (3:52)
7. Ricky Martin – "She Bangs" (4:04)
8. Human Nature – "He Don't Love You" (3:11)
9. ATC – "Around the World (La La La La La)" (3:37)
10. Pink – "Most Girls" (5:00)
11. Joy Enriquez – "Tell Me How You Feel" (4:06)
12. 3 Doors Down – "Kryptonite" (3:55)
13. Incubus – "Drive" (3:54)
14. Weezer – "Island in the Sun" (3:20)
15. Something for Kate – "Three Dimensions" (3:22)
16. Stella One Eleven – "Go Slow Girl" (3:43)
17. Vanessa Amorosi – "The Power" (3:25)
18. Ronan Keating – "Lovin' Each Day" (3:32)
19. Craig David – "Walking Away" (3:25)
20. Dido – "Thank You" (3:38)

== Charts ==
Year	Chart	Peak position	Certification
2001	ARIA Compilations Chart	1	4× Platinum
