= So Fresh: The Hits of Spring 2000 =

Compilation album by Various Artists
- Released: August 28, 2000
- Genre: Pop
- Label: JVC/BMG Australia

So Fresh chronology
So Fresh: The Hits of Spring 2000 (2000)	So Fresh: The Hits of Summer 2001 (2000)

So Fresh: The Hits Of Spring 2000 is a compilation album released by So Fresh. This was the first album in the So Fresh series and was released in Australia on 28 August 2000 to replace the Hit Machine series.

== Track listing ==
1. Bon Jovi – "It's My Life" (3:44)
2. Anastacia – "I'm Outta Love" (3:47)
3. Bomfunk MC's – "Freestyler" (2:53)
4. Sisqó – "Thong Song" (3:28)
5. S Club 7 – "S Club Party" (3:28)
6. Vanessa Amorosi – "Shine" (3:53)
7. Leah Haywood – "We Think It's Love" (3:14)
8. Jessica Simpson – "I Think I'm in Love with You" (3:37)
9. Mandy Moore – "So Real" (3:49)
10. Vertical Horizon – "Everything You Want" (4:06)
11. Lo-Tel – "Teenager of the Year" (4:29)
12. Aqua – "Around the World" (3:28)
13. Enrique Iglesias – "Be with You" (3:39)
14. Real Blondes – "I Won't Let Go" (3:11)
15. Christina Aguilera – "I Turn to You" (3:57)
16. Anuj – "Can You Stand the Heat" (3:24)
17. Eiffel 65 – "Too Much of Heaven" (4:09)
18. Hanson – "This Time Around" (3:59)
19. Blink-182 – "Adam's Song" (3:34)
20. Live – "They Stood Up for Love" (4:15)

== Charts ==
Year	Chart	Peak position	Certification
2000	ARIA Compilations Chart	1	3xPlatinum
