= I Spy =

I Spy or iSpy may refer to:

== Game ==
- I spy, a guessing game
- Industrial Spy: Operation Espionage, also known as I Spy, a squad-based tactical strategy game

== Books ==
- I-Spy (Michelin), a series of spotter's guides for children, 1950s onwards
- I Spy (book series), a 1990s series of picture books by Jean Marzollo and Walter Wick

== Film and television ==
- I Spy (2002 film), a film starring Eddie Murphy and Owen Wilson
- I Spy, an episode from the BBC children's show Balamory
- I Spy (1934 film), a British film
- I Spy (1955 TV series), a TV series starring Raymond Massey
- I Spy (1965 TV series), an American television series starring Robert Culp and Bill Cosby
- I Spy (2002 TV series), an HBO Family series based on the picture books
- "iSpy" (Modern Family), the 14th episode of the fifth season of American television series Modern Family

== Music ==
- I Spy (band), a Canadian band
- "I Spy" (Erica Baxter song), a 2006 song from Through My Eyes
- "iSpy" (Kyle song), a 2016 song by Kyle featuring Lil Yachty
- "I Spy", a song by Dead Kennedys from the album Bedtime for Democracy
- "I Spy", a song by Pulp from Different Class

== See also ==
- Eye Spy (disambiguation)
