= Tony Scott (disambiguation) =

Tony Scott (1944–2012) was a British film director.

Tony or Anthony Scott may also refer to:

== Entertainment ==
- Tony Scott (musician) (1921–2007), American jazz clarinetist
- Tony Scott (rapper) (1971–2026), Dutch rapper
- Tony Lee Scott, Australian pop singer
- A. O. Scott (Anthony Oliver Scott, born 1966), American film critic

== Sports ==
- Tony Scott (baseball) (1951–2024), American professional baseball player
- Tony Scott (footballer) (1941–2021), English professional footballer
- Tony Scott (American football) (born 1976), American footballer
- Anthony Scott (footballer) (born 1995), Australian rules footballer for the Western Bulldogs
- Tony Scott (wrestler) (1935–2015), Welsh wrestler

== Other ==
- Tony Scott (politician) (born 1976), member of the Connecticut House of Representatives
- Tony Scott (physicist), Irish physicist and science communicator
- Tony Scott, CIO of the US federal government 2015–2017
