= Helen Fry =

British historian, lecturer and biographer

Dr Helen Fry (born 1967) is an English historian, author, biographer and broadcaster who specialises in the history of World War II, with a particular focus on espionage and the Intelligence services of the Allies. She has written and edited over 25 books covering the social history of the Second World War, including topics covering women in Intelligence, the 10,000 German and Austrian Jewish refugees who fought for Britain, and wider coverage of espionage and spy networks.

== Early life and education ==
Helen Fry was born in North Devon in 1967. She graduated with a B.A. Hons in 1991 and Ph.D. in 1994 in Theology/Theological Studies from the University of Exeter. During the 1990s, Fry was active on the international stage in the youth movement of The Council of Christians and Jews, and in promoting inter-faith relations.

== Career ==
Fry is an Honorary Research Fellow in the Department of Hebrew and Jewish Studies at University College London and teaches at the London Jewish Cultural Centre. She presented a paper at the 2001 symposium at the University of Southampton on "Port Jews."

Fry has written over 25 books, with special expertise on the 10,000 German-speaking refugees who served in the British forces during the Second World War, especially in the Royal Pioneer Corps. Reviewer Martin Rubin described her book Freud's War as taking readers into the "unusual corners of global conflicts" and described her book as a detailed portrait of different military experiences during World War II.

Fry's writing on women in espionage has explored female spy networks, the range of roles women undertook in espionage (including as double agents, as interrogators and parachuting behind enemy lines), tasks undertaken by women such as knitting codes into woollen jumpers and secret eavesdropping. She has also recounted the lives of some of the famous Bletchley Park codebreakers.

Fry has been interviewed as a military history expert for television documentaries, including David Jason’s Secret Service (Channel 4), Spying on Hitler’s Army (Channel 4/PBS), Churchill’s Germany Army (National Geographic) Race To Victory (History Channel), Home Front Heroes (BBC1) and The Hunt for Hitler’s Missing Millions (Channel 5). She has additionally covered the D-Day anniversary commemorations with historian and broadcaster James Holland in live BBC broadcasts from Normandy.

Fry is an ambassador for the National Centre for Military Intelligence (NCMI) and a trustee of both the Friends of the Intelligence Corps Museum and the Medmenham Collection. She is also President of The Friends of the National Archives UK.

== Awards ==
Fry's book MI9: A History of the British Secret Service for Escape and Evasion in WWII was shortlisted for The Duke of Wellington Military Medal in 2021.

Fry was awarded the Military History Matters Magazine Silver Award for her 2023 book, Women in Intelligence, which was voted for by readers. The book was also named a Waterstones Best Book of 2023 in the Military History category.

She has also been awarded the Lifetime Contribution Award for Jewish Military History and Education by the Jewish Military Association. She is an Honorary member of The Association of Jewish Refugees.

== Selected publications ==
- The King's Most Loyal Enemy Aliens (Sutton, 2007). Republished in paperback as Churchill's German Army (The History Press, 2010).
- Music & Men: The Life and Loves of Harriet Cohen (The History Press, 2009).
- Freud's War (The History Press, 2009).
- The M Room (self-published on Amazon, 2013).
- The London Cage: The Secret History of Britain's WWII Interrogation Centre (Yale University Press, 2017)
- MI9: A History of the Secret Service for Escape and Evasion in World War II (Yale University Press, 2020)
- The Walls Have Ears: The Greatest Intelligence Operation of World War II. (Yale University Press, 2020)
- Spymaster: The Man who Saved MI6 (Yale University Press, 2021) a biography about Thomas Kendrick
- Women in Intelligence (Yale University Press, 2023)
- X Troop Commando (Yale University Press, 2024)

Fry is also an associate editor of Eye Spy Magazine.
