= So Fresh: The Hits of Summer 2007 =

So Fresh: The Hits of Summer 2007 Plus the Best of 2006

Compilation album by Various artists
- Released: 25 November 2006
- Genre: Pop
- Length: 72:09 (CD 1); 74:54 (CD 2)
- Label: Sony BMG

So Fresh chronology
So Fresh: The Hits of Spring 2006 (2006)	So Fresh: The Hits of Summer 2007 Plus the Best of 2006 (2006)	So Fresh: The Hits of Autumn 2007 (2007)

So Fresh: The Hits of Summer 2007 Plus the Best of 2006 is a compilation of the latest songs that were popular in Australia. This particular version includes "the best of 2006", featuring the best music of all 2006 compilations. It was released on 25 November 2006. It was the number one compilation album in the 2006 End of Year ARIA Charts. The album also was certified quintuple platinum in 2007.

== Track listing ==
=== CD 1 ===
1. Justin Timberlake featuring Timbaland – "SexyBack" (4:03)
2. Scissor Sisters – "I Don't Feel Like Dancin'" (4:48)
3. Nelly Furtado – "Maneater" (3:17)
4. Pink – "U + Ur Hand" (3:33)
5. Sandi Thom – "What If I'm Right" (2:56)
6. The Pussycat Dolls – "I Don't Need a Man" (3:40)
7. Rihanna – "We Ride" (3:56)
8. Stephanie McIntosh – "Tightrope" (3:02)
9. Christina Aguilera – "Hurt" (4:02)
10. TV Rock – "Bimbo Nation" (3:13)
11. James Morrison – "You Give Me Something" (3:32)
12. Guy Sebastian – "Taller, Stronger, Better" (3:47)
13. Ne-Yo – "When You're Mad" (3:40)
14. Beyoncé – "Irreplaceable" (3:48)
15. Nick Lachey – "I Can't Hate You Anymore" (3:53)
16. Young Divas – "Happenin' All Over Again" (3:28)
17. Human Nature – "Dancing in the Street" (2:55)
18. The Black Eyed Peas – "Pump It" (3:34)
19. Sugababes – "Red Dress" (3:36)
20. Girlband – "Party Girl" (3:26)

=== CD 2 ===
1. Fergie – "London Bridge" (3:28)
2. Shakira featuring Carlos Santana – "Illegal" (3:53)
3. The Killers – "When You Were Young" (3:39)
4. Wolfmother – "Joker & the Thief" (3:29)
5. Rogue Traders – "In Love Again" (3:40)
6. Nickelback – "If Everyone Cared" (3:36)
7. The Fray – "How to Save a Life" (4:23)
8. Augie March – "One Crowded Hour" (4:13)
9. Anthony Callea – "Live for Love" (3:45)
10. Westlife – "You Raise Me Up" (4:00)
11. Ashlee Simpson – "L.O.V.E." (2:33)
12. Lindsay Lohan – "Confessions of a Broken Heart (Daughter to Father)" (3:40)
13. Snow Patrol – "Chasing Cars" (4:26)
14. Delta Goodrem – "Together We Are One" (4:14)
15. Erica Baxter – "I Spy" (3:31)
16. Chris Lake featuring Laura V – "Changes" (3:14)
17. Melissa Tkautz – "Easily Affected" (3:58)
18. Sérgio Mendes featuring The Black Eyed Peas – "Mas que Nada" (4:23)
19. Chicane featuring Tom Jones – "Stoned in Love" (3:38)
20. Chamillionaire featuring Krayzie Bone – "Ridin'" (5:05)

== Charts ==
Chart (2006–2007)	Peak position
Australian ARIA Top 20 Compilations	1

== Certifications ==
Region	Certification	Certified units/sales
Australia (ARIA)	5× Platinum	350,000^{^}
^{^} Shipments figures based on certification alone.

== See also ==
- So Fresh
- 2006 in music
- 2007 in music
