= What Do You Want (disambiguation) =

What Do You Want may refer to:

- "What Do You Want", a song by Jerrod Niemann
- "What Do You Want?", a song by Adam Faith
- "What Do You Want", a song by Benson Boone from the album Fireworks & Rollerblades
- "What Do You Want", a song by Joy Enriquez from the album Joy Enriquez (album)
- "What Do U Want", a song by Cassie from the album Cassie (album)
