= Eye Spy =

Eye Spy may refer to:

- Eye Spy Magazine, a British magazine focusing on the intelligence community
- Eye Spy (EP), an EP by Bullet for My Valentine
- "Eye Spy" (Agents of S.H.I.E.L.D.), an episode of the television series Agents of S.H.I.E.L.D.
- "Eye Spy" (NCIS), an episode of the television series NCIS
- "Eye Spy", an episode of the television series Zoboomafoo

== See also ==
- I Spy (disambiguation)
