= I Won't Let Go =

I Won't Let Go may refer to:

- "I Won't Let Go" (InMe song)
- "I Won't Let Go" (Janelle Monáe song)
- "I Won't Let Go" (Rascal Flatts song)
- "I Won't Let Go", a song by John P. Kee from the album Colorblind (1994), also on the compilation WOW Gospel 2004
- "I Won't Let Go", a single by Monarchy (band)
- "I Won't Let Go", a single by Real Blondes
- "I Won't Let Go", a single by The System (band)
- "I Won't Let Go", a song by Mike Tramp from the album More to Life Than This
