= So Fresh: The Hits of Spring 2004 =

Compilation album by Various artists
- Released: 20 September 2004
- Genre: Pop
- Label: Sony BMG

So Fresh chronology
So Fresh: The Hits of Winter 2004 (2004)	So Fresh: The Hits of Spring 2004 (2004)	So Fresh: The Hits of Summer 2005 (2004)

So Fresh: The Hits of Spring 2004 is a compilation of songs that were popular in Australia in winter 2004. It was released on 20 September 2004.

== Track listing ==
1. Avril Lavigne – "My Happy Ending" (4:03)
2. JC Chasez – "All Day Long I Dream About Sex" (3:36)
3. Paulini – "Angel Eyes" (4:03)
4. Cosima – "When the War Is Over" (3:46)
5. Anastacia – "Sick and Tired" (3:30)
6. The Black Eyed Peas – "Let's Get It Started" (3:38)
7. Usher – "Burn" (4:17)
8. Freestylers – "Push Up" (3:56)
9. J-Kwon – "Tipsy" (4:06)
10. Outkast – "Roses" (4:14)
11. Frankee – "F.U.R.B. (Fuck You Right Back)" (3:19)
12. Britney Spears – "Everytime" (Hi-Bias Radio Remix) (3:28)
13. Jessica Simpson – "Take My Breath Away" (3:14)
14. Shannon Noll – "Learn to Fly" (4:12)
15. Miranda Murphy – "That Girl" (3:36)
16. Rob Mills – "Ms. Vanity" (3:46)
17. Kayne Taylor – "Heartbreaker" (3:10)
18. Franz Ferdinand – "Take Me Out" (3:58)
19. Killing Heidi –"I Am" (3:26)
20. Hoobastank – "The Reason" (3:53)

== Charts ==
Year	Chart	Peak Position	Certification
2004	ARIA Compilations Chart	1	2xPlatinum

== See also ==
- So Fresh
