= So Fresh: The Hits of Spring 2008 =

Compilation album by Various artists
- Released: 13 September 2008
- Genre: Pop
- Label: Sony BMG

So Fresh chronology
So Fresh: The Hits of Winter 2008 (2008)	So Fresh: The Hits of Spring 2008 (2008)	So Fresh: The Hits of Summer 2009 (2009)

So Fresh: The Hits of Spring 2008 is a compilation of twenty tracks by various artists which were popular on the ARIA Charts of Australia in mid-2008 and is part of the ongoing So Fresh series. Along with the audio disc, it included a DVD containing music videos for ten tracks, and was released on 13 September 2008.

== Track listing ==
=== Disc 1 ===
1. Metro Station – "Shake It" (3:00)
2. Sam Sparro – "Black and Gold" (3:32)
3. Rihanna – "Disturbia" (3:58)
4. Chris Brown – "Forever" (4:37)
5. Ne-Yo – "Closer" (3:56)
6. Jordin Sparks – "One Step at a Time" (3:26)
7. The Potbelleez – "Are You with Me" (3:42)
8. MGMT – "Electric Feel" (3:49)
9. The Ting Tings – "That's Not My Name" (5:10)
10. The Living End – "White Noise" (3:44)
11. Brian McFadden – "Twisted" (3:38)
12. Ladyhawke – "Paris Is Burning" (3:49)
13. Vanessa Amorosi – "The Simple Things (Something Emotional)" (3:36)
14. Pete Murray – "Saving Grace" (2:58)
15. Nelly featuring Fergie – "Party People" (4:04)
16. Usher – "Moving Mountains" (5:00)
17. Alicia Keys – "Superwoman" (4:35)
18. Kelly Rowland featuring Travie McCoy – "Daylight" (3:31)
19. Delta Goodrem – "I Can't Break It to My Heart" (4:01)
20. Lady Gaga featuring Colby O'Donis – "Just Dance" (Trevor Simpson Edit) (3:40)

=== Disc 2 (DVD) ===
1. Metro Station – "Shake It"
2. Sam Sparro – "Black and Gold"
3. Rihanna – "Disturbia"
4. Chris Brown – " Forever"
5. Jordin Sparks – "One Step at a Time"
6. The Potbelleez – "Are You with Me"
7. MGMT – "Electric Feel"
8. Brian McFadden – "Twisted"
9. Vanessa Amorosi – "The Simple Things (Something Emotional)"
10. Pete Murray – "Saving Grace"
11. Nelly featuring Fergie – "Party People"
12. Alicia Keys – "Superwoman"

== Charts ==
Chart (2008)	Peak position
Australian ARIA Compilation Albums Chart	1

== Certifications ==
Region	Certification	Certified units/sales
Australia (ARIA)	2× Platinum	140,000^{^}
^{^} Shipments figures based on certification alone.
