= So Fresh: The Hits of Summer 2003 =

Compilation album by various artists
- Released: 25 November 2002
- Genre: Pop
- Label: Sony BMG

So Fresh chronology
So Fresh: The Hits of Spring 2002 (2002)	So Fresh: The Hits of Summer 2003 (2002)	So Fresh: The Hits of Autumn 2003 (2003)

So Fresh: The Hits of Summer 2003 Plus the Biggest Hits of 2002 is a compilation of the latest songs that were popular in Australia. It was released on 25 November 2002.

== Track listing ==
=== CD 1 ===
1. Las Ketchup – "The Ketchup Song (Aserejé)" (3:32)
2. Holly Valance – "Down Boy" (3:26)
3. Enrique Iglesias – "Don't Turn Off the Lights" (3:47)
4. Shakaya – "Cinderella" (3:34)
5. Killing Heidi – "Outside of Me" (4:00)
6. Scooter – "The Logical Song" (3:54)
7. Kelly Osbourne – "Papa Don't Preach" (3:25)
8. Wyclef Jean featuring Claudette Ortiz – "Two Wrongs" (3:52)
9. Good Charlotte – "Lifestyles of the Rich and Famous" (3:11)
10. Daniel Bedingfield – "James Dean (I Wanna Know)" (3:41)
11. Westlife – "Unbreakable" (4:32)
12. Monica – "All Eyez on Me" (4:00)
13. Ronan Keating – "I Love It When We Do" (3:51)
14. U2 – "Electrical Storm" (William Orbit Mix) (4:39)
15. Sugababes – "Round Round" (3:57)
16. Toya – "No Matta What (Party All Night)" (3:27)
17. Marc Anthony – "I've Got You" (3:49)
18. Abs – "What You Got" (3:54)
19. Tina Arena – "Symphony of Life" (Metro Mix 7") (4:08)
20. Milky – "Just the Way You Are" (3:34)

=== CD 2 ===
1. Elvis vs. JXL – "A Little Less Conversation" (3:33)
2. George Michael – "Freeek!" (4:33)
3. Darren Hayes – "Insatiable" (5:11)
4. Usher – "U Got It Bad" (4:08)
5. Nikki Webster – "Something More Beautiful" (3:31)
6. Nelly – "Hot in Herre" (3:49)
7. Sophie Ellis-Bextor – "Murder on the Dancefloor" (3:47)
8. DJ Ötzi – "Hey Baby" (3:37)
9. John Mayer – "No Such Thing" (3:52)
10. Chad Kroeger featuring Josey Scott – "Hero" (3:19)
11. Selwyn – "Way Love's Supposed to Be" (3:50)
12. Ja Rule featuring Case – "Livin' It Up" (4:18)
13. Alicia Keys – "Girlfriend" (3:35)
14. A1 – "Caught in the Middle" (3:25)
15. The Calling – "Wherever You Will Go" (3:29)
16. DJ Sammy and Yanou featuring Do – "Heaven" (S'n'Y Mix) (3:54)
17. Kosheen – "Hide U" (4:12)
18. Pink – "Get the Party Started" (3:12)
19. Tim Deluxe – "It Just Won't Do" (3:20)
20. Five for Fighting – "Superman (It's Not Easy)" (3:44)

== Charts ==
Year	Chart	Peak position	Certification
2002	ARIA Compilations Chart	1	6× Platinum
