= Through My Eyes (album) =

Studio album by Erica Baxter
- Released: 28 April 2007 (Australia)
- Recorded: 2005–2007
- Genre: Pop
- Label: Sony BMG
- Producer: Audius Mtawarira

Through My Eyes is singer, model Erica Baxter's debut album. It was released in April 2007 through Sony BMG. The album features Erica's debut single, "I Spy" which was written by singer, songwriter Natasha Bedingfield. Baxter co-wrote 8 of the 12 tracks. The album failed to chart on the Top 100 albums chart.

== Track listing ==
#	Title	Songwriters	Duration
1.	"Hey"	Erica Baxter/Audius Mtwararia	3:10
2.	"Brokenhearted"	Erica Baxter/Tom Nichols/Tim Baxter	3:23
3.	"I Spy"	Natasha Bedingfield/Kevin D Hughes	3:31
4.	"Drive"	Erica Baxter/Kevin D Hughes/Adam Argyle/Lou Mullen	3:46
5.	"Just Another Day"	Erica Baxter/Audius Mtwararia	3:12
6.	"I Don't Feel A Thing"	Hanne Sorvaag/Tommy Berre	3:37
7.	"Jane Doe"	Erica Baxter/Dion Howell/Michael "fingaz" Mugisha	2:46
8.	"Kiss Me Again"	Dion Howell/Marcus Killian/Michael "fingaz" Mugisha	3:51
9.	"Ever Be The Same"	Erica Baxter/Audius Mtwararia	3:54
10.	"Frustrated"	Erica Baxter/Audius Mtwararia/Erinn Sherlock	4:05
11.	"So Beautiful"	Michael Szumowski/N. Dunn	4:14
12.	"Country Girl"	Erica Baxter/Audius Mtwararia	3:53

== Others ==
- "Something Is Following Me" (Erica Baxter/Audius Mtawarira) - Unreleased album session track.
- "Fly Away" (Erica Baxter/Audius Mtawarira/Passion Gold) - "I Spy" b-side.
- "Paper Tiger" (Erica Baxter/Audius Mtawariria/Erin Sherlock) - "I Spy" b-side.
- "I Dream of Ice Cream" (Chris Harriott, Simon Hopkinson) - was to be on The Food album.

== Charts ==
Chart (2007)	Peak position
Australian Hitseekers Chart	18
