= So Fresh: The Hits of Spring 2015 =

Compilation album by Various Artists
- Released: 11 September 2015
- Genre: Pop
- Label: Universal Music Australia

So Fresh chronology
So Fresh: The Hits of Winter 2015 (2015)	So Fresh: The Hits of Spring 2015 (2015)	So Fresh: The Hits of Summer 2016 (2015)

So Fresh: The Hits of Spring 2015 is a compilation album which has 22 tracks. The album was released on 11 September 2015, and peaked at number one on the ARIA Compilations Chart. The album has been certified gold for shipment of 35,000 units.

== Track listing ==
Standard edition
No.	Title	Artist(s)	Length
1.	"Are You with Me"	Lost Frequencies	2:20
2.	"Wings"	Delta Goodrem	3:28
3.	"Like I'm Gonna Lose You"	Meghan Trainor and John Legend	3:45
4.	"Can't Feel My Face"	The Weeknd	3:37
5.	"Watch Me (Whip/Nae Nae)"	Silentó	3:04
6.	"Worth It" (featuring Kid Ink)	Fifth Harmony	3:45
7.	"Black Magic"	Little Mix	3:33
8.	"She's Kinda Hot"	5 Seconds of Summer	3:18
9.	"Flashlight"	Jessie J	3:30
10.	"Fire and the Flood"	Vance Joy	4:11
11.	"Scars" (radio edit)	James Bay	3:57
12.	"Waiting for Love"	Avicii	3:51
13.	"Cool for the Summer"	Demi Lovato	3:36
14.	"Shine"	Years & Years	3:30
15.	"Stole the Show" (featuring Parson James)	Kygo	3:45
16.	"You Know You Like It" (featuring AlunaGeorge)	DJ Snake	4:09
17.	"You Were Right"	Rüfüs	4:01
18.	"Show Me Love" (featuring Kimberly Anne)	Sam Feldt	3:03
19.	"When You Feel This" (featuring Jay Sean and Rick Ross)	Stafford Brothers	3:25
20.	"Follow Me" (featuring Jason Derulo)	Hardwell	3:20
21.	"Whip It!" (featuring Chloe Angelides)	LunchMoney Lewis	4:05
22.	"Freedom"	Pharrell Williams	2:42

=== Bonus DVD ===
1. 5 Seconds of Summer – "She's Kinda Hot"
2. Delta Goodrem – "Wings"
3. Lost Frequencies – "Are You with Me"
4. The Weeknd – "Can't Feel My Face"
5. Silentó – "Watch Me (Whip/Nae Nae)"
6. Jessie J – "Flashlight"
7. Vance Joy – Fire and the Flood"
8. Fifth Harmony featuring Kid Ink – "Worth It"
9. Avicii – "Waiting for Love"
10. Years & Years – "Shine"
11. Pharrell Williams – "Freedom"
12. Sam Feldt featuring Kimberly Anne – "Show Me Love"

== Charts ==
Chart (2015)	Position
Australia (ARIA) Top 20 Compilations	1

== Certifications ==
Region	Certification	Certified units/sales
Australia (ARIA)	Gold	35,000^{^}
^{^} Shipments figures based on certification alone.
