= So Fresh: The Hits of Summer 2004 =

So Fresh: The Hits of Summer 2004 Plus the Best of 2003

Compilation album by Various artists
- Released: 1 December 2003
- Genre: Pop
- Label: Sony BMG

So Fresh chronology
So Fresh: The Hits of Spring 2003 (2003)	So Fresh: The Hits of Summer 2004 Plus the Best of 2003 (2003)	So Fresh: The Hits of Autumn 2004 (2004)

So Fresh: The Hits of Summer 2004 Plus the Best of 2003 is a compilation album featuring songs from various artists in many genres. Songs were picked from some of the most popular during the summer of 2003, plus a few of the most popular songs from 2003. The album was released on 1 December 2003. Despite Avril Lavigne being listed on the album artwork as a featured artist there is no song by that artist on this release.

== Track listing ==
Disc 1

1. Australian Idol – The Final 12 – "Rise Up" (3:47)
2. The Black Eyed Peas – "Where Is the Love?" (4:33)
3. Delta Goodrem – "Not Me, Not I" (4:25)
4. Dido – "White Flag" (3:38)
5. Justin Timberlake – "Señorita" (4:56)
6. Pink – "Trouble" (3:13)
7. Kelly Clarkson – "Low" (3:29)
8. Holly Valance – "State of Mind" (3:19)
9. Evanescence – "Going Under" (3:35)
10. Eminem – "Business" (4:13)
11. 50 Cent – "21 Questions" (3:45)
12. R. Kelly – "Thoia Thoing" (3:43)
13. Big Brovaz – "Baby Boy" (3:20)
14. Elvis Presley – "Rubberneckin'" (Paul Oakenfold Remix) (3:29)
15. Junior Senior – "Move Your Feet" (3:00)
16. Gareth Gates – "Sunshine" (3:37)
17. Maroon 5 – "Harder to Breathe" (2:54)
18. Stella One Eleven – "Out There Somewhere" (4:10)
19. The Ataris – "The Boys of Summer" (4:19)
20. Nickelback – "Someday" (3:27)

Disc 2

1. Powderfinger – "(Baby I've Got You) On My Mind" (3:21)
2. Christina Aguilera – "Fighter" (4:07)
3. INXS – "I Get Up" (3:29)
4. Mýa – "My Love Is Like...Wo" (3:29)
5. Jay-Z featuring Beyoncé – "'03 Bonnie & Clyde" (3:25)
6. t.A.T.u. – "Not Gonna Get Us" (3:37)
7. David Campbell – "When She's Gone" (3:34)
8. Thicke – "When I Get You Alone" (3:36)
9. Something for Kate – "Song for a Sleepwalker" (3:53)
10. Sandrine – "Trigger" (3:45)
11. Lo-Tel – "Angel" (3:36)
12. Jason Nevins presents U.K.N.Y. featuring Holly James – "I'm in Heaven" (3:37)
13. Puddle of Mudd – "She Hates Me" (3:28)
14. 1200 Techniques – "Where Ur At" (3:52)
15. Kurtis Mantronik presents Chamonix – "How Did You Know (77 Strings)" (3:31)
16. Candice Alley – "Dream the Day Away" (Four on the Floor Mix) (4:05)
17. Duncan James – "The Speed of Life" (3:54)
18. Nikki Webster – "Dancing in the Street" (3:51)
19. Ja Rule featuring Ashanti – "Mesmerize" (4:39)
20. Counting Crows featuring Vanessa Carlton – "Big Yellow Taxi" (3:46)

== Charts ==
Year	Chart	Peak position	Certification
2003	ARIA Compilations Chart	1	4xPlatinum

== See also ==
- So Fresh
- 2004 in music
