= So Fresh: The Hits of Winter 2016 =

Compilation album by Various Artists
- Released: 17 June 2016
- Genre: Pop
- Label: Universal Music Australia

So Fresh chronology
So Fresh: The Hits of Autumn 2016 (2016)	So Fresh: The Hits of Winter 2016 (2016)	So Fresh: The Hits of Spring 2016 (2016)

So Fresh: The Hits of Winter 2016 is a compilation album which has 22 tracks. The album was released on 17 June 2016.

== Track listing ==
Standard edition
No.	Title	Artist(s)	Length
1.	"Just Like Fire"	Pink	3:36
2.	"Don't Let Me Down" (featuring Daya)	The Chainsmokers	3:28
3.	"Say It" (featuring Tove Lo)	Flume	4:21
4.	"I Took a Pill in Ibiza" (Seeb Remix)	Mike Posner	3:17
5.	"Work from Home" (featuring Ty Dolla Sign)	Fifth Harmony	3:36
6.	"No"	Meghan Trainor	3:35
7.	"Dear Life"	Delta Goodrem	3:09
8.	"Sound of Silence"	Dami Im	3:18
9.	"Secret Love Song" (featuring Jason Derulo)	Little Mix	4:09
10.	"Dangerous Woman"	Ariana Grande	3:55
11.	"Wild Things"	Alessia Cara	3:09
12.	"Lot to Learn"	Luke Christopher	4:07
13.	"Panda"	Desiigner	3:46
14.	"Company"	Justin Bieber	3:28
15.	"Wherever I Go"	OneRepublic	2:51
16.	"This Girl"	Kungs vs. Cookin' on 3 Burners	3:16
17.	"Sex"	Cheat Codes and Kris Kross Amsterdam	3:49
18.	"Like I Would"	Zayn	3:14
19.	"Close" (featuring Tove Lo)	Nick Jonas	3:55
20.	"Rock Bottom" (featuring DNCE)	Hailee Steinfeld	3:18
21.	"Team"	Iggy Azalea	3:30
22.	"Messin' Around" (featuring Enrique Iglesias)	Pitbull	3:43

== Charts ==
=== Weekly charts ===
Chart (2016)	Position
Australia (ARIA) Top 20 Compilations	1

=== Year-end charts ===
Chart (2016)	Position
Australia (ARIA) Top 50 Compilations	7

== Certifications ==
Region	Certification	Certified units/sales
Australia (ARIA)	Platinum	70,000^{^}
^{^} Shipments figures based on certification alone.
