= So Fresh: The Hits of Autumn 2007 =

Compilation album by Various artists
- Released: 26 March 2007
- Recorded: 2007
- Genre: Pop
- Length: 72:09
- Label: Sony BMG

So Fresh chronology
So Fresh: The Hits of Summer 2007 (2007)	So Fresh: The Hits of Autumn 2007 (2007)	So Fresh: The Hits of Winter 2007 (2007)

So Fresh: The Hits of Autumn 2007 is a compilation of the latest songs that were popular in Australia. It was released on 26 March 2007. The CD artwork was created by Dónall at Campbell Murray Creating. The CD thanks Denis Handlin, Tony Glover, Gill Robert, Casandra Tennant-Pascoe (Sony BMG Music Entertainment Australia)

== Track listing ==
1. Gwen Stefani – "Wind It Up" (3:10)
2. Damien Leith – "Night of My Life" (3:32)
3. Nelly Furtado – "Say It Right" (3:34)
4. Fall Out Boy – "This Ain't a Scene, It's an Arms Race" (3:32)
5. The Killers – "Bones" (3:46)
6. The Fray – "How to Save a Life" (4:21)
7. Shannon Noll and Natalie Bassingthwaighte – "Don't Give Up" (4:40)
8. Fergie featuring will.i.am – "Fergalicious" (4:53)
9. Pink – "Nobody Knows" (3:56)
10. Scissor Sisters – "She's My Man" (4:02)
11. Snow Patrol – "Hands Open" (3:15)
12. JoJo – "Too Little Too Late" (3:39)
13. Paula DeAnda featuring The D.E.Y. – "Walk Away (Remember Me)" (4:20)
14. The Pussycat Dolls featuring Timbaland – "Wait a Minute" (3:42)
15. Guy Sebastian – "Elevator Love" (3:39)
16. Stephanie McIntosh – "So Do I Say Sorry First?" (3:00)
17. Take That – "Patience" (3:19)
18. Anthony Callea – "Addicted to You" (3:32)
19. Evanescence – "Lithium" (3:42)
20. Teddy Geiger – "These Walls" (3:41)
- "How to Save a Life" by The Fray is also featured on So Fresh: The Hits of Summer 2007.

== Certifications ==
Region	Certification	Certified units/sales
Australia (ARIA)	Platinum	70,000^{^}
^{^} Shipments figures based on certification alone.

== See also ==
- 2007 in music
