= So Fresh: The Hits of Autumn 2003 =

Compilation album by various artists
- Released: 28 March 2003
- Genre: Pop
- Length: 76:03
- Label: Sony BMG Music Entertainment

So Fresh chronology
So Fresh: The Hits of Summer 2003 (2002)	So Fresh: The Hits of Autumn 2003 (2003)	So Fresh: The Hits of Winter 2003 (2003)

So Fresh: The Hits of Autumn 2003 is a compilation of songs that were popular in Australia in summer 2003. It was released on 28 March 2003.

== Track listing ==
1. Big Brovaz – "Nu Flow" (3:19)
2. Eminem – "Cleanin' Out My Closet" (4:37)
3. Christina Aguilera – "Beautiful" (4:00)
4. Counting Crows featuring Vanessa Carlton – "Big Yellow Taxi" (3:45)
5. Delta Goodrem – "Born to Try" (4:11)
6. Avril Lavigne – "Sk8er Boi" (3:23)
7. Puddle of Mudd – "She Hates Me" (3:27)
8. Jennifer Lopez featuring Jadakiss and Styles P – "Jenny from the Block" (Trackmasters Remix) (3:08)
9. Kelly Rowland – "Stole" (4:09)
10. Holly Valance – "Naughty Girl" (3:22)
11. Ja Rule featuring Bobby Brown – "Thug Lovin'" (4:33)
12. In-Grid – "You Promised Me (Tu Es Foutu)" (3:36)
13. Pink – "Family Portrait" (3:48)
14. LeAnn Rimes – "Life Goes On" (3:33)
15. DJ Sammy – "The Boys of Summer" (4:00)
16. The Androids – "Do It with Madonna" (3:48)
17. Ronan Keating and Lulu – "We've Got Tonight" (Almighty Vocal Edit) (3:32)
18. Kylie Minogue – "Come into My World" (4:05)
19. Nikki Webster – "24/7 (Crazy 'bout Your Smile)" (3:17)
20. Bon Jovi – "Misunderstood" (3:47)

== Charts ==
Year	Chart	Peak position	Certification
2003	ARIA Compilations Chart	1	4xPlatinum
