= So Fresh: The Hits of Winter 2002 =

Compilation album by Various artists
- Released: 17 June 2002
- Genre: Pop
- Label: Sony BMG

So Fresh chronology
So Fresh: The Hits of Autumn 2002 (2002)	So Fresh: The Hits of Winter 2002 (2002)	So Fresh: The Hits of Spring 2002 (2002)

So Fresh: The Hits of Winter 2002 is an Australian compilation album of pop songs. It was released on 17 June 2002 by Sony BMG.

== Track listing ==
1. Shakira – "Whenever, Wherever" (3:18)
2. The Calling – "Wherever You Will Go" (3:29)
3. Ronan Keating – "If Tomorrow Never Comes" (3:37)
4. Enrique Iglesias – "Hero" (4:12)
5. Ja Rule featuring Ashanti – "Always on Time" (4:05)
6. Busta Rhymes – "Break Ya Neck" (4:06)
7. Selwyn – "Way Love's Supposed to Be" (3:52)
8. Westlife – "World of Our Own" (3:31)
9. Anastacia – "One Day in Your Life" (3:30)
10. Jamiroquai – "Love Foolosophy" (3:48)
11. Kosheen – "Catch" (3:23)
12. Toya – "I Do!!" (3:37)
13. Alicia Keys – "A Woman's Worth" (4:23)
14. Five for Fighting – "Superman (It's Not Easy)" (3:42)
15. U2 – "Walk On" (4:31)
16. Grinspoon – "Chemical Heart" (4:40)
17. 1200 Techniques – "Karma" (4:21)
18. H-Blockx featuring Turbo B – "The Power" (3:29)
19. Natalie Imbruglia – "Wrong Impression" (3:25)
20. Pink – "Get the Party Started" (3:13)

== Charts ==
Year	Chart	Peak position	Certification
2002	ARIA Compilations Chart	1	3× Platinum
