= So Fresh: The Hits of Spring 2001 =

Compilation album by Various artists
- Released: 17 September 2001
- Genre: Pop
- Label: Sony BMG

So Fresh chronology
So Fresh: The Hits of Winter 2001 (2001)	So Fresh: The Hits of Spring 2001 (2001)	So Fresh: The Hits of Summer 2002 (2002)

So Fresh: The Hits Of Spring 2001 is a compilation album which features some of the most popular songs in 2001 in Australia.

== Track listing ==
1. S Club 7 – "Don't Stop Movin'" (3:53)
2. Lifehouse – "Hanging by a Moment" (3:36)
3. Train – "Drops of Jupiter (Tell Me)" (4:20)
4. The Supermen Lovers – "Starlight" (3:50)
5. Destiny's Child – "Bootylicious" (3:29)
6. Jagged Edge featuring Run–D.M.C. – "Let's Get Married" (4:10)
7. D12 – "Purple Pills" (4:24)
8. Nelly featuring City Spud – "Ride wit Me" (4:16)
9. Creed – "With Arms Wide Open" (3:44)
10. Toploader – "Dancing in the Moonlight" (3:51)
11. Westlife – "Uptown Girl" (3:07)
12. Mandy Moore – "In My Pocket" (3:41)
13. Jennifer Lopez – "Play" (3:18)
14. Sirens featuring The Big Brother Housemates – "The Housemates Song (Don't You Think That It's Strange?)" (3:39)
15. Joanne – "So Damn Fine" (3:37)
16. Roger Sanchez – "Another Chance" (3:16)
17. Fatboy Slim – "Weapon of Choice" (5:38)
18. Something for Kate – "Monsters" (3:39)
19. Dido – "Here with Me" (4:06)
20. Blink-182 – "The Rock Show" (2:50)

== Charts ==
Year	Chart	Peak position	Certification
2001	ARIA Compilations Chart	1	5xPlatinum
