= So Fresh: The Hits of Winter 2005 =

Compilation album by Various artists
- Released: 11 June 2005
- Genre: Pop
- Label: Sony BMG

So Fresh chronology
So Fresh: The Hits of Autumn 2005 (2005)	So Fresh: The Hits of Winter 2005 (2005)	So Fresh: The Hits of Spring 2005 (2005)

So Fresh: The Hits of Winter 2005 is a compilation of songs that were popular in Australia in winter 2005. It was released on 11 June 2005.

== Track listing ==
1. Will Smith – "Switch" (3:17)
2. Gwen Stefani featuring Eve – "Rich Girl" (3:57)
3. Mario – "Let Me Love You" (4:17)
4. Mariah Carey featuring Jermaine Dupri and Fatman Scoop – "It's Like That" (3:23)
5. Frankie J – "Obsession (No Es Amor) (So Fresh Version)" (3:20)
6. Nitty – "Hey Bitty" (2:50)
7. Tammin – "Whatever Will Be" (3:46)
8. Britney Spears – "Do Somethin'" (3:23)
9. Anthony Callea – "Rain" (3:47)
10. Delta Goodrem and Brian McFadden – "Almost Here" (3:47)
11. Shakaya featuring Nate Wade – "Are You Ready" (3:23)
12. Ashlee Simpson – "La La" (3:42)
13. Usher – "Caught Up" (3:46)
14. Destiny's Child – "Soldier" (So Fresh Version) (3:53)
15. Joel Turner and The Modern Day Poets – "Funk U Up" (4:15)
16. Guy Sebastian – "Oh Oh" (Cutfather & Joe Remix) (3:17)
17. Avril Lavigne – "He Wasn't" (2:59)
18. Lindsay Lohan – "Over" (3:39)
19. Rogue Traders – "Voodoo Child" (3:33)
20. BodyRockers – "I Like the Way" (3:21)

== Charts ==
Year	Chart	Peak position	Certification
2005	ARIA Compilations Chart	1	2xPlatinum

== See also ==
- So Fresh
