= So Fresh: The Hits of Winter 2006 =

Compilation album by Various artists
- Released: 10 June 2006
- Genre: Pop
- Label: Sony BMG

So Fresh chronology
So Fresh: The Hits of Autumn 2006 (2006)	So Fresh: The Hits of Winter 2006 (2006)	So Fresh: The Hits of Spring 2006 (2006)

So Fresh: The Hits of Winter 2006 is part of the So Fresh album series. It was released in Australia on 10 June 2006.

== Track listing ==
1. Rihanna – "SOS" (4:00)
2. Rogue Traders – "We're Coming Home" (3:22)
3. Ne-Yo – "So Sick" (3:27)
4. Chris Brown – "Yo (Excuse Me Miss)" (3:48)
5. Mariah Carey featuring Jermaine Dupri – "Get Your Number" (3:15)
6. Young Divas – "This Time I Know It's for Real" (3:39)
7. The Pussycat Dolls featuring will.i.am – "Beep" (3:48)
8. Sugababes – "Red Dress" (3:36)
9. Pink – "Stupid Girls" (3:12)
10. Westlife – "You Raise Me Up" (Chameleon Remix) (3:17)
11. Delta Goodrem – "Together We Are One" (4:14)
12. Ashlee Simpson – "L.O.V.E." (2:33)
13. Shannon Noll – "Now I Run" (3:43)
14. Nickelback – "Savin' Me" (3:37)
15. The Black Eyed Peas – "Pump It" (3:34)
16. Bernard Fanning – "Songbird" (2:35)
17. Pete Murray – "Opportunity" (3:37)
18. Christina Milian featuring Young Jeezy – "Say I" (3:32)
19. Lee Harding – "Anything for You" (3:02)
20. Kate DeAraugo – "Faded" (3:30)
21. Deep Dish featuring Stevie Nicks – "Dreams" (3:48)

== Charts ==
Year	Chart	Peak position	Certification
2006	ARIA Compilations Chart	1	2xPlatinum

== See also ==
- So Fresh
- 2006 in music
