= So Fresh: The Hits of Summer 2005 =

So Fresh: The Hits of Summer 2005 plus the Biggest Hits of 2004

Compilation album by Various artists
- Released: 22 November 2004
- Genre: Pop
- Length: 76:57 (CD 1); 75:03 (CD 2)
- Label: Sony BMG

Various artists chronology
| So Fresh: The Hits of Spring 2004 (2004) | So Fresh: The Hits of Summer 2005 plus the Biggest Hits of 2004 (2004) | So Fresh: The Hits of Autumn 2005 (2005) |

So Fresh: The Hits of Summer 2005 plus the Biggest Hits of 2004 is a compilation album which features some of the most popular songs in 2004 in Australia. The album was released on 22 November 2004.

== Track listing ==
=== CD 1 ===
1. JoJo – "Leave (Get Out)" (4:01)
2. Guy Sebastian – "Out with My Baby" (3:38)
3. Nelly – "My Place" (4:31)
4. Jessica Simpson – "Angels" (4:03)
5. Joel Turner and the Modern Day Poets – "These Kids" (3:59)
6. Usher – "Confessions Part II" (3:50)
7. Maroon 5 – "She Will Be Loved" (4:00)
8. Seether featuring Amy Lee – "Broken" (4:17)
9. Natasha Bedingfield – "These Words" (3:35)
10. The Black Eyed Peas – "Shut Up" (5:06)
11. Darren Hayes – "Popular" (3:52)
12. Spiderbait – "Black Betty" (3:26)
13. Killing Heidi – "Calm Down" (3:30)
14. Shannon Noll – "New Beginning" (3:59)
15. Nickelback – "Figured You Out" (3:48)
16. Blink-182 – "I Miss You" (3:46)
17. Pete Murray – "Please" (3:23)
18. Nina Sky – "Move Ya Body" (3:51)
19. LMC vs. U2 – "Take Me to the Clouds Above" (2:48)
20. Alcazar – "This Is the World We Live In" (3:35)

=== CD 2 ===
1. Avril Lavigne – "Nobody's Home" (3:33)
2. Anastacia – "Welcome to My Truth" (4:02)
3. Britney Spears – "My Prerogative" (3:33)
4. Hilary Duff and Haylie Duff – "Our Lips Are Sealed" (2:39)
5. Ciara – "Goodies" (3:34)
6. Dido – "Sand in My Shoes" (5:00)
7. Ronan Keating – "I Hope You Dance" (3:35)
8. Paulini – "We Can Try" (3:40)
9. Rob Mills – "Every Single Day" (3:35)
10. Grinspoon – "Hard Act to Follow" (3:28)
11. Evanescence – "My Immortal" (4:33)
12. Limp Bizkit – "Behind Blue Eyes" (4:30)
13. Gavin DeGraw – "I Don't Want to Be" (3:38)
14. 3 Doors Down – "Here Without You" (3:57)
15. Kylie Minogue – "Chocolate" (3:59)
16. Outkast – "Prototype" (4:24)
17. Baby Bash – "Suga Suga" (3:59)
18. Selwyn – "Boomin'" (3:03)
19. Sarah Connor – "Bounce" (Kayrob Radio Mix) (3:13)
20. Armand Van Helden – "My My My" (3:05)

== Charts ==
| Year | Chart | Peak position | Certification |
|---|---|---|---|
| 2004 | ARIA Compilations Chart | 1 | 4xPlatinum |

== See also ==
- So Fresh
- 2004 in music
