= So Fresh: The Hits of Spring 2002 =

Compilation album by Various artists
- Released: 16 September 2002
- Genre: Pop
- Label: Sony BMG

So Fresh chronology
| So Fresh: The Hits of Winter 2002 (2002) | So Fresh: The Hits of Spring 2002 (2002) | So Fresh: The Hits of Summer 2003 (2002) |

So Fresh: The Hits of Spring 2002 is a compilation of songs that were popular in Australia at the time of release. It was released on 16 September 2002.

== Track listing ==
1. Holly Valance – "Kiss Kiss" (Wise Buddah Mix) (3:25)
2. Sophie Ellis-Bextor – "Get Over You" (3:14)
3. Enrique Iglesias – "Escape" (3:28)
4. Nelly – "Hot in Herre" (3:49)
5. Shakaya – "Sublime" (3:18)
6. DJ Sammy and Yanou featuring Do – "Heaven" (S'n'Y Mix) (3:54)
7. Angie Stone – "Wish I Didn't Miss You" (4:19)
8. Ashanti – "Foolish" (3:51)
9. Christina Milian – "When You Look at Me" (3:43)
10. Pink – "Don't Let Me Get Me" (3:31)
11. Destiny's Child – "Nasty Girl" (Maurice's Nu Soul Remix) (3:59)
12. Jennifer Lopez featuring Nas – "I'm Gonna Be Alright" (Trackmasters Remix) (2:53)
13. Will Smith introducing Trā-Knox – "Black Suits Comin' (Nod Ya Head)" (3:55)
14. Paulina Rubio – "Don't Say Goodbye" (3:39)
15. Selwyn – "Rich Girl" (Rudy Mix) (3:28)
16. Charlton Hill – "2's Company" (3:53)
17. Bachelor Girl – "I'm Just a Girl" (3:56)
18. Tim Deluxe – "It Just Won't Do" (3:19)
19. DJ Ötzi – "Hey Baby" (3:37)
20. Tenacious D – "Tribute" (3:56)

== Charts ==
| Year | Chart | Peak position | Certification |
|---|---|---|---|
| 2002 | ARIA Compilations Chart | 1 | 4× Platinum |
