= So Fresh: The Hits of Autumn 2014 =

Compilation album by Various artists
- Released: 28 March 2014
- Genre: Pop
- Label: Universal Music Australia

So Fresh chronology
So Fresh: The Hits of Summer 2014 (2014)	So Fresh: The Hits of Autumn 2014 (2014)	So Fresh: The Hits of Winter 2014 (2014)

So Fresh: The Hits of Autumn 2014 is a compilation that features 22 songs that have charted the top 40 on the ARIA Charts. The album was released on 28 March 2014.

== Track listing ==
CD
No.	Title	Artist	Length
1.	"Happy" (From Despicable Me 2)	Pharrell Williams	3:51
2.	"All of Me"	John Legend	4:29
3.	"Addicted to You"	Avicii	2:27
4.	"Swing" (Joel Fletcher Mix) (Radio Edit)	Joel Fletcher and Savage	2:58
5.	"Rude"	MAGIC!	3:43
6.	"Brave"	Sara Bareilles	3:38
7.	"Unconditionally"	Katy Perry	3:48
8.	"You're Beautiful"	Nathaniel	2:59
9.	"Midnight Memories"	One Direction	2:54
10.	"Strong"	London Grammar	4:34
11.	"God Only Knows"	MKTO	3:14
12.	"The Man"	Aloe Blacc	4:14
13.	"She Looks So Perfect"	5 Seconds of Summer	3:22
14.	"When You Were Mine"	Taylor Henderson	3:27
15.	"Jump" (Edited)	Rihanna	4:24
16.	"Red Lights"	Tiësto	3:21
17.	"Like a Drum"	Guy Sebastian	3:00
18.	"Adore You"	Miley Cyrus	4:37
19.	"The Best Day of My Life" (Single Version)	American Authors	3:13
20.	"Of the Night"	Bastille	3:34

iTunes bonus tracks
No.	Title	Artist	Length
21.	"You're Beautiful" (Matt Watkins Remix)	Nathaniel	5:34
22.	"Strong" (High Contrast Remix)	London Grammar	5:28

== Charts ==
Chart (2014)	Peak position
Australian ARIA Compilations Chart	1

=== Year-end charts ===
Chart (2014)	Peak position
Australian ARIA Compilations Chart	5

== Certifications ==
Region	Certification	Certified units/sales
Australia (ARIA)	Platinum	70,000^{^}
^{^} Shipments figures based on certification alone.
