= So Fresh: The Hits of Spring 2011 =

Compilation album by Various artists
- Released: 9 September 2011
- Genre: Pop
- Label: Sony Music

So Fresh chronology
So Fresh: The Hits of Winter 2011 (2011)	So Fresh: The Hits of Spring 2011 (2011)	So Fresh: The Hits of Summer 2012 + The Best of 2011 (2011)

So Fresh: The Hits of Spring 2011 is an Australian compilation album. The album was the #2 compilation of the year and was certified platinum. The album was released on 9 September 2011.

== Track listing ==
CD

1. Gotye featuring Kimbra – "Somebody That I Used to Know" (4:04)
2. Maroon 5 featuring Christina Aguilera – "Moves like Jagger" (3:21)
3. Jessica Mauboy – "Inescapable" (3:34)
4. Nicki Minaj – "Super Bass" (3:20)
5. LMFAO featuring Natalia Kills – "Champagne Showers" (4:23)
6. Rihanna – "Cheers (Drink to That)" (4:00)
7. Lady Gaga – "The Edge of Glory" (4:21)
8. Calvin Harris featuring Kelis – "Bounce" (3:38)
9. Aloe Blacc – "I Need a Dollar" (4:03)
10. Hot Chelle Rae – "Tonight Tonight" (3:18)
11. Example – "Changed the Way You Kiss Me" (3:12)
12. Marvin Priest featuring Wynter Gordon – Take Me Away" (3:49)
13. Chris Brown – "She Ain't You" (4:06)
14. Jessie J – "Nobody's Perfect" (3:41)
15. Britney Spears – "I Wanna Go" (3:30)
16. The Black Eyed Peas – "Don't Stop the Party" (3:59)
17. Benny Benassi featuring Gary Go – "Cinema" (3:01)
18. Avril Lavigne – "Smile" (3:27)
19. Pete Murray – "Always a Winner" (4:11)
20. Jack Vidgen – "Yes I Am" (3:34)

DVD

1. Gotye featuring Kimbra – "Somebody That I Used to Know"
2. Jessica Mauboy – "Inescapable"
3. Nicki Minaj – "Super Bass"
4. Calvin Harris featuring Kelis – "Bounce"
5. Aloe Blacc – "I Need a Dollar"
6. Hot Chelle Rae – "Tonight Tonight"
7. Example – "Changed the Way You Kiss Me"
8. Marvin Priest featuring Wynter Gordon – "Take Me Away"
9. Chris Brown – "She Ain't You"
10. Jessie J – "Nobody's Perfect"
11. Benny Benassi featuring Gary Go – "Cinema"
12. Pete Murray – "Always a Winner"
