= So Fresh: The Hits of Winter 2003 =

Compilation album by various artists
- Released: 30 June 2003
- Recorded: 2003
- Genre: Pop
- Length: 76:03
- Label: Sony BMG Music Entertainment

So Fresh chronology
So Fresh: The Hits of Autumn 2003 (2003)	So Fresh: The Hits of Winter 2003 (2003)	So Fresh: The Hits of Spring 2003 (2003)

So Fresh: The Hits of Winter 2003 is a compilation album composed of songs that were popular at the time of release. The album sold less copies than the other So Fresh albums released in the same year, but was still certified 2× Platinum.

== Track listing ==
1. t.A.T.u. – "All the Things She Said" (3:34)
2. Christina Aguilera – "Fighter" (4:06)
3. Delta Goodrem – "Lost Without You" (4:10)
4. Justin Timberlake – "Cry Me a River" (4:48)
5. Jay-Z featuring Beyoncé – "'03 Bonnie & Clyde" (3:25)
6. Jennifer Lopez featuring LL Cool J – "All I Have" (4:15)
7. Amiel – "Lovesong" (3:30)
8. Dixie Chicks – "Landslide" (The Sheryl Crow Remix) (3:49)
9. Avril Lavigne – "I'm with You" (3:44)
10. Ja Rule featuring Ashanti – "Mesmerize" (4:39)
11. Kelly Rowland – "Can't Nobody" (4:04)
12. Candice Alley – "Falling" (3:41)
13. Rogue Traders vs. INXS – "One of My Kind" (3:20)
14. Saffron Hill featuring Ben Onono – "My Love is Always" (3:30)
15. Grinspoon – "Don't Change" (3:51)
16. Busted – "What I Go to School For" (3:29)
17. Shakaya – "The Way You Make Me Feel" (Shakaya Style) (3:50)
18. Macy Gray – "When I See You" (3:43)
19. Shawn Desman – "Get Ready" (3:34)
20. Sarah Whatmore – "When I Lost You" (3:27)

== Certifications ==
Year	Chart	Peak position	Certification
2003	ARIA Compilations Chart	1	2xPlatinum

== See also ==
- So Fresh
- 2003 in music
