= So Fresh: The Hits of Autumn 2002 =

Compilation album by various artists
- Released: 25 March 2002
- Genre: Pop
- Label: Sony BMG

So Fresh chronology
So Fresh: The Hits of Summer 2002 (2001)	So Fresh: The Hits of Autumn 2002 (2002)	So Fresh: The Hits of Winter 2002 (2002)

So Fresh: The Hits of Autumn 2002 is a compilation of songs that were popular in Australia in summer 2002. The album was released on 25 March 2002.

== Track listing ==
1. Sophie Ellis-Bextor – "Murder on the Dancefloor" (3:47)
2. 112 – "Dance with Me" (3:58)
3. Shakaya – "Stop Calling Me" (3:37)
4. Ja Rule featuring Case – "Livin' It Up" (4:18)
5. Nickelback – "How You Remind Me" (3:43)
6. Alcazar – "Crying at the Discoteque" (3:51)
7. Jennifer Lopez – "I'm Real" (3:15)
8. Alicia Keys – "Fallin'" (3:30)
9. St. Lunatics featuring Nelly – "Batter Up" (4:12)
10. Blu Cantrell – "Hit 'Em Up Style (Oops!)" (4:10)
11. Mary J. Blige – "Family Affair" (4:00)
12. Jagged Edge featuring Nelly – "Where the Party At" (3:54)
13. Natalie Imbruglia – "That Day" (4:42)
14. Nikki Webster – "The Best Days" (3:23)
15. Christina Milian – "AM to PM" (3:51)
16. Killing Heidi – "Heavensent" (4:30)
17. Jamiroquai – "You Give Me Something" (3:18)
18. Anastacia – "Paid My Dues" (3:20)
19. Tina Arena – "Dare You to Be Happy" (4:11)
20. Kosheen – "Hide U" (John Creamer & Stephane K Remix Edit) (4:13)

== Charts ==
Year	Chart	Peak position	Certification
2002	ARIA Compilations Chart	1	3× Platinum
