= So Fresh: The Hits of Winter 2004 =

Compilation album by Various artists
- Released: 21 June 2004
- Genre: Pop
- Label: Sony BMG

So Fresh chronology
So Fresh: The Hits of Autumn 2004 (2004)	So Fresh: The Hits of Winter 2004 (2004)	So Fresh: The Hits of Spring 2004 (2004)

So Fresh: The Hits of Winter 2004 is a compilation of songs that were popular in Australia in winter 2004. It was released on 21 June 2004. Despite including 'I Don't Want You Back' this album doesn't have a warning label for explicit language, though the version of the song on this release is the clean edited version.

== Track listing ==
1. Anastacia – "Left Outside Alone" (4:16)
2. Shannon Noll – "Drive" (3:58)
3. Jessica Simpson – "With You" (3:11)
4. Baby Bash featuring Frankie J – "Suga Suga" (3:59)
5. Beyoncé – "Naughty Girl" (3:28)
6. Outkast – "The Way You Move" (3:54)
7. Human Nature – "When You Say You Love Me" (4:01)
8. Maroon 5 – "This Love" (3:26)
9. Pete Murray – "So Beautiful" (4:38)
10. Avril Lavigne – "Don't Tell Me" (3:25)
11. The Black Eyed Peas – "Hey Mama" (3:46)
12. Britney Spears – "Toxic" (3:19)
13. Sarah Connor – "Bounce" (3:14)
14. Enrique Iglesias featuring Kelis – "Not in Love" (3:42)
15. Guy Sebastian – "All I Need Is You" (4:04)
16. Eamon – "Fuck It (I Don't Want You Back)" (3:45)
17. Three Days Grace – "I Hate Everything About You" (3:52)
18. Courtney Act – "Rub Me Wrong" (3:49)
19. Popstars Live: The Finalists – "Stand Up Next to Me" (4:11)
20. Nickelback – "Feelin' Way Too Damn Good" (3:53)

== Charts ==
Year	Chart	Peak position	Certification
2004	ARIA Compilations Chart	1	4xPlatinum

== See also ==
- So Fresh
