= So Fresh: The Hits of Summer 2006 =

So Fresh: The Hits of Summer 2006 Plus the Best of 2005

Compilation album by Various artists
- Released: 27 November 2005
- Genre: Pop
- Length: 72:09 (CD 1); 74:54 (CD 2)
- Label: Sony BMG

So Fresh chronology
So Fresh: The Hits of Spring 2005 (2005)	So Fresh: The Hits of Summer 2006 Plus the Best of 2005 (2005)	So Fresh: The Hits of Autumn 2006 (2006)

So Fresh: The Hits of Summer 2006 Plus the Best of 2005 is a compilation album featuring songs from various artists in all genres. Songs were picked from some of the most popular during the summer of 2005 and 2006, plus a few most popular songs from 2005. The album was released on 27 November 2005.

This compilation album has been certified five times platinum, selling in excess of 350,000 copies, which makes it one of So Fresh's most popular compilations released.

== Track listing ==
CD 1

1. Mariah Carey – "We Belong Together" (3:22)
2. The Pussycat Dolls – "Don't Cha" (4:03)
3. Jessica Simpson – "These Boots Are Made for Walkin'" (3:41)
4. Kelly Clarkson – "Because of You" (3:40)
5. Bon Jovi – "Have a Nice Day" (3:50)
6. Nickelback – "Photograph" (4:20)
7. Gwen Stefani – "Cool" (3:11)
8. Rogue Traders – "Way to Go!" (3:11)
9. Rihanna – "Pon de Replay" (3:36)
10. The Black Eyed Peas – "Don't Lie" (3:41)
11. Pete Murray – "Better Days" (3:46)
12. Ashlee Simpson – "Boyfriend" (3:01)
13. Ben Lee – "Into the Dark" (2:47)
14. Alex Lloyd – "Never Meant to Fail" (3:48)
15. Akon – "Belly Dancer (Bananza)" (4:01)
16. Amerie – "Touch" (3:40)
17. The Killers – "Smile Like You Mean It" (3:55)
18. Backstreet Boys – "Just Want You to Know" (3:53)
19. Frankie J – "Obsession (No Es Amor)" (3:21)
20. Spiderbait – "On My Way" (3:23)

CD 2

1. Shannon Noll – "Shine" (3:34)
2. U2 – "City of Blinding Lights" (5:47)
3. Franz Ferdinand – "Do You Want To" (3:37)
4. Bloodhound Gang – "Foxtrot Uniform Charlie Kilo" (2:52)
5. Joel Turner and The Modern Day Poets – "Respect" (4:05)
6. Anthony Callea – "Per Sempre (for Always)" (3:52)
7. Delta Goodrem – "Be Strong" (4:01)
8. Natalie Imbruglia – "Shiver" (3:43)
9. 2Pac featuring Elton John – "Ghetto Gospel" (3:59)
10. Bow Wow featuring Omarion – "Let Me Hold You" (4:09)
11. Charlotte Church – "Crazy Chick" (3:08)
12. Australian Idol Final 13 – "Ready" (3:31)
13. BodyRockers – "Round and Round" (3:24)
14. Will Smith – "Switch" (3:17)
15. Nitty – "Nasty Girl" (4:08)
16. Usher – "Caught Up" (3:46)
17. Britney Spears – "Do Somethin'" (3:23)
18. David Campbell – "End of the World" (4:10)
19. Random – "Are You Ready" (3:43)
20. Good Charlotte – "I Just Wanna Live" (2:46)

== Charts ==
Year	Chart	Peak position	Certification
2005	ARIA Compilations Chart	1	5xPlatinum

== See also ==
- So Fresh
- 2005 in music
