= So Fresh: The Hits of Autumn 2006 =

Compilation album by Various artists
- Released: 26 March 2006
- Genre: Pop
- Label: Sony BMG Music Entertainment

So Fresh chronology
| So Fresh: The Hits of Summer 2006 (2005) | So Fresh: The Hits of Autumn 2006 (2006) | So Fresh: The Hits of Winter 2006 (2006) |

So Fresh: The Hits of Autumn 2006 is a compilation album featuring songs from various artists in all genres of popular music. The songs were picked from among some of the most popular during the autumn of 2006 in Australia. The album was released on 26 March 2006.

== Track listing ==
1. Mariah Carey – "Don't Forget About Us" (3:54)
2. Chris Brown – "Run It!" (3:14)
3. Gwen Stefani – "Luxurious" (4:26)
4. TV Rock – "Flaunt It" (3:29)
5. Rogue Traders – "Watching You" (3:29)
6. Lee Harding – "Wasabi" (3:00)
7. The Black Eyed Peas – "My Humps" (4:12)
8. The Pussycat Dolls – "Stickwitu" (3:29)
9. Sugababes – "Push the Button" (3:38)
10. Kelly Clarkson – "Walk Away" (3:08)
11. Rihanna – "If It's Lovin' that You Want" (3:28)
12. Daddy Yankee – "Gasolina" (3:15)
13. Nickelback – "Far Away" (3:59)
14. Bernard Fanning – "Wish You Well" (2:31)
15. Pete Murray – "Class A" (3:05)
16. Shannon Noll – "Lift" (3:57)
17. Lindsay Lohan – "Confessions of a Broken Heart (Daughter to Father)" (3:43)
18. Kate DeAraugo – "Maybe Tonight" (3:38)
19. Backstreet Boys – "I Still..." (3:49)
20. Meck featuring Leo Sayer – "Thunder in My Heart Again" (3:08)

== Charts ==
| Year | Chart | Peak position | Certification |
|---|---|---|---|
| 2006 | ARIA Compilations Chart | 1 | 2xPlatinum |

== See also ==
- So Fresh
- 2006 in music
