= The Call (Joy Enriquez album) =

Studio album by Joy Enriquez
- Released: January 15, 2016
- Genre: Gospel, Christian pop, Christian EDM, Christian R&B, urban gospel, worship
- Length: 61:01
- Label: Lifestyle
- Producer: Rodney Jerkins

The Call is the third studio album from Joy Enriquez. Lifestyle Music Group released the album on January 15, 2016. She worked with her husband, Rodney Jerkins, in the production of this album.

== Critical reception ==
Professional ratings
Review scores
Source	Rating
365 Days of Inspiring Media	4.5/5 stars
New Release Today	4/5 stars

Awarding the album four stars from New Release Today, Dwayne Lacy states, "The Call just works, and it is not forced." Jonathan Andre, allotting the album four and a half stars at 365 Days of Inspiring Media, writes, "The Call, my favourite gospel infused album I've heard since Mandisa's Overcomer!" Reviewing the album for Hallels, Timothy Yap says, "She is comfortable, expressive, and as her name suggests joyful."

== Track listing ==
No.	Title	Length
1.	"O' Happy Day"	6:00
2.	"Shine" (featuring Heavenly Joy)	4:59
3.	"Conquer"	4:10
4.	"Hallelujah" (featuring Kirk Franklin and Lindsey Stirling)	4:25
5.	"Walking on Water"	3:57
6.	"Shelter"	4:09
7.	"The Call"	3:50
8.	"70,000"	3:55
9.	"Lord I Need You"	3:24
10.	"Nothing but the Blood"	5:42
11.	"Imagine That"	4:05
12.	"Wonderful"	4:16
13.	"Hosanna (The Greatest Hero)"	3:41
14.	"The Call" (Spanish version)	4:28
Total length:		61:01

== Chart performance ==
Chart (2016)	Peak position
US Top Gospel Albums (Billboard)	24
