= So Fresh: The Hits of Autumn 2016 =

Compilation album by Various artists
- Released: 18 March 2016
- Genre: Pop
- Label: Sony Music Australia

So Fresh chronology
So Fresh: The Hits of Summer 2016 (2015)	So Fresh: The Hits of Autumn 2016 (2016)	So Fresh: The Hits of Winter 2016 (2016)

So Fresh: The Hits of Autumn 2016 is a compilation album which has 22 tracks. The album was released on 18 March 2016, and peaked at number one on the ARIA Compilations Chart. The album has been certified gold for shipment of 35,000 units.

== Track listing ==
Standard edition
No.	Title	Artist(s)	Length
1.	"Love Yourself"	Justin Bieber	3:51
2.	"Pillowtalk"	Zayn	3:23
3.	"Fast Car" (featuring Dakota)	Jonas Blue	3:30
4.	"All My Friends" (featuring Tinashe and Chance the Rapper)	Snakehips	3:48
5.	"Youth"	Troye Sivan	3:03
6.	"The Girl Is Mine" (featuring Destiny's Child and Brandy)	99 Souls	3:32
7.	"Roses" (featuring Rozes)	The Chainsmokers	3:45
8.	"Middle" (featuring Bipolar Sunshine)	DJ Snake	3:39
9.	"1955" (featuring Montaigne and Tom Thum)	Hilltop Hoods	3:57
10.	"Ex's & Oh's"	Elle King	3:21
11.	"Hands to Myself"	Selena Gomez	3:20
12.	"Keep Talking"	Cyrus	3:24
13.	"Stand by You"	Rachel Platten	3:37
14.	"Flip It" (featuring Snoop Dogg)	Charlotte Devaney	3:14
15.	"Sax"	Fleur East	3:56
16.	"Sweet Lovin'" (featuring Bryn Christopher)	Sigala	3:21
17.	"Reality" (featuring Janieck Devy)	Lost Frequencies	2:38
18.	"In the Night"	The Weeknd	3:54
19.	"Something in the Way You Move"	Ellie Goulding	3:45
20.	"Here"	Alessia Cara	3:19
21.	"Keeping Score" (featuring Paige IV)	L D R U	3:02
22.	"Faded"	Alan Walker	3:31

== Weekly charts ==
Chart (2016)	Position
Australia (ARIA) Top 20 Compilations	1

== Certifications ==
Region	Certification	Certified units/sales
Australia (ARIA)	Gold	35,000^{^}
^{^} Shipments figures based on certification alone.
