= So Fresh: The Hits of Autumn 2004 =

2004 compilation album by various artists

Compilation album by various artists
- Released: 29 March 2004
- Genre: Pop
- Label: Sony BMG

So Fresh chronology
So Fresh: The Hits of Summer 2004 (2003)	So Fresh: The Hits of Autumn 2004 (2004)	So Fresh: The Hits of Winter 2004 (2004)

So Fresh: The Hits of Autumn 2004 is a compilation of songs that were popular in Australia in autumn 2004.

== Track listing ==
1. Shannon Noll – "What About Me" (3:20)
2. Outkast – "Hey Ya!" (3:57)
3. Delta Goodrem – "Predictable" (3:38)
4. The Black Eyed Peas – "Shut Up" (3:47)
5. Guy Sebastian – "Angels Brought Me Here" (3:58)
6. Kylie Minogue – "Red Blooded Woman" (4:19)
7. Limp Bizkit – "Behind Blue Eyes" (4:31)
8. Kelly Clarkson – "The Trouble with Love Is" (3:40)
9. Nickelback – "Figured You Out" (3:49)
10. Martin Solveig – "Rocking Music" (3:38)
11. Fatman Scoop featuring The Crooklyn Clan – "Be Faithful" (2:42)
12. Beyoncé – "Me, Myself and I" (3:58)
13. Christina Aguilera – "The Voice Within" (4:25)
14. Powderfinger – "Sunsets" (3:51)
15. Pink – "God Is a DJ" (3:46)
16. Hilary Duff – "Come Clean" (3:35)
17. D.Kay & Epsilon featuring Stamina MC – "Barcelona" (3:31)
18. Justin Timberlake – "I'm Lovin' It" (3:43)
19. Junior Senior – "Rhythm Bandits" (2:51)
20. Mercury4 – "5 Years from Now" (3:46)

== Charts ==
Year	Chart	Peak position	Certification
2004	ARIA Compilations Chart	1	3xPlatinum

== See also ==
- So Fresh
