= So Fresh: The Hits of Spring 2003 =

Compilation album by various artists
- Released: 15 September 2003
- Genre: Pop
- Label: BMG Australia

Various artists chronology
So Fresh: The Hits of Winter 2003 (2003)	So Fresh: The Hits of Spring 2003 (2003)	So Fresh: The Hits of Summer 2004 (2003)

So Fresh: The Hits of Spring 2003 is a compilation album part of the Australian best-selling So Fresh series. It was released on 15 September 2003.

== Track listing ==
1. R. Kelly – "Ignition (Remix)" (3:04)
2. Kelly Clarkson – "Miss Independent" (3:34)
3. 50 Cent – "In da Club" (3:46)
4. Beyoncé featuring Jay-Z – "Crazy in Love" (4:11)
5. Ja Rule – "The Reign" (4:07)
6. Justin Timberlake – "Rock Your Body" (4:27)
7. Evanescence – "Bring Me to Life" (3:55)
8. Delta Goodrem – "Innocent Eyes" (3:51)
9. Gareth Gates – "Unchained Melody" (3:53)
10. Big Brovaz – "Favourite Things" (3:14)
11. Mercury4 – "Get Me Some" (3:44)
12. Planet Funk – "Who Said (Stuck in the UK)" (3:06)
13. Jennifer Lopez – "I'm Glad" (3:42)
14. David Campbell – "Hope" (3:12)
15. Amity Dry – "The Lighthouse" (4:38)
16. Blu Cantrell – "Breathe" (3:22)
17. Something for Kate – "Déjà Vu" (4:13)
18. Ashanti – "Rock wit U (Awww Baby)" (3:38)
19. Anita Spring – "Blink (Stay a Little Longer)" (Groove Bros. Remix) (3:12)
20. Avril Lavigne – "Losing Grip" (3:54)

== Charts ==
Year	Chart	Peak position	Certification
2003	ARIA Compilations Chart	1	3xPlatinum
