= So Fresh: The Hits of Autumn 2001 =

Compilation album by Various Artists
- Released: 2 April 2001
- Genre: Pop
- Label: Sony BMG Music Entertainment

So Fresh chronology
So Fresh: The Hits of Summer 2001 (2000)	So Fresh: The Hits of Autumn 2001 (2001)	So Fresh: The Hits of Winter 2001 (2001)

So Fresh: The Hits of Autumn 2001 is a compilation album featuring songs from various artists in all genres. The songs were picked from some of the most popular during the autumn of 2001 in Australia.

== Track listing ==
1. Destiny's Child – "Independent Women" (3:41)
2. Mýa – "Case of the Ex" (3:53)
3. Ricky Martin – "She Bangs" (4:04)
4. Human Nature – "He Don't Love You" (3:12)
5. Vanessa Amorosi – "The Power" (3:26)
6. U2 – "Beautiful Day" (4:07)
7. 3 Doors Down – "Kryptonite" (3:56)
8. Samantha Mumba – "Body II Body" (3:59)
9. Pink – "Most Girls" (5:01)
10. Kandi – "Don't Think I'm Not" (3:52)
11. Nelly – "Country Grammar (Hot Shit)" (3:53)
12. soulDecision – "Faded" (3:30)
13. Westlife – "My Love" (3:53)
14. Sonique – "Sky" (4:03)
15. 98 Degrees – "Give Me Just One Night (Una Noche)" (3:26)
16. Ronan Keating – "The Way You Make Me Feel" (3:40)
17. Joanne – "Busted" (3:15)
18. Anastacia – "Not That Kind" (3:22)
19. You Am I – "Damage" (3:29)
20. Public Domain – "Operation Blade (Bass in the Place)" (3:06)

== Charts ==
Year	Chart	Peak position	Certification
2001	ARIA Compilations Chart	1	Platinum
