= So Fresh: The Hits of Winter 2007 =

Compilation album by Various Artists
- Released: 16 June 2007
- Genre: Pop
- Label: Sony BMG

So Fresh chronology
So Fresh: The Hits of Autumn 2007 (2007)	So Fresh: The Hits of Winter 2007 (2007)	So Fresh: The Hits of Spring 2007 (2007)

So Fresh: The Hits of Winter 2007 is an Australian compilation album containing the latest music that were popular in Australia at the time of release. It was released on 16 June 2007 (see 2007 in music). On 2 July 2007 the album was certified as platinum for selling 70,000 copies.

== Track listing ==
1. Avril Lavigne – "Girlfriend" (3:38)
2. Gwen Stefani featuring Akon – "The Sweet Escape" (4:07)
3. Mika – "Grace Kelly" (3:08)
4. Christina Aguilera – "Candyman" (3:15)
5. Justin Timberlake – "What Goes Around... Comes Around" (5:15)
6. Pink – "Leave Me Alone (I'm Lonely)" (3:20)
7. Hinder – "Lips of an Angel" (4:22)
8. Good Charlotte – "Keep Your Hands off My Girl" (3:25)
9. Dean Geyer – "If You Don't Mean It" (3:13)
10. Nelly Furtado – "All Good Things (Come to an End)" (5:12)
11. Ne-Yo – "Because of You" (3:49)
12. TV Rock vs. Dukes of Windsor – "The Others" (3:25)
13. Timbaland featuring Justin Timberlake and Nelly Furtado – "Give It to Me" (3:34)
14. The All-American Rejects – "It Ends Tonight" (3:45)
15. Kings of Leon – "On Call" (3:23)
16. Sophie Ellis-Bextor – "Catch You" (3:18)
17. James Morrison – "Undiscovered" (3:29)
18. Amy Winehouse – "Rehab" (3:34)
19. Young Divas – "Searchin'" (3:33)
20. Girlband – "Electric" (3:33)

== Charts ==
Chart (2007)	Peak position
Australian ARIA Top 20 Compilations Chart	1

== Certifications ==
Region	Certification	Certified units/sales
Australia (ARIA)	Platinum	70,000^{^}
^{^} Shipments figures based on certification alone.

== See also ==
- So Fresh
