= So Fresh: The Hits of Winter 2008 =

Compilation album by Various artists
- Released: 21 June 2008
- Genre: Pop
- Label: Sony BMG

So Fresh chronology
So Fresh: The No. 1 Hits (2008)	So Fresh: The Hits of Winter 2008 (2008)	So Fresh: The Hits of Spring 2008 (2008)

So Fresh: The Hits of Winter 2008 is a compilation of songs which were popular on the ARIA Charts of Australia in Winter 2008. It was released on 21 June 2008. It features a DVD containing the latest music videos.

== Track listing ==
=== CD ===
1. Newton Faulkner – "Dream Catch Me" (3:58)
2. Rihanna – "Take a Bow" (3:49)
3. Mariah Carey – "Touch My Body" (3:29)
4. Leona Lewis – "Better in Time" (3:53)
5. Kelly Rowland – "Work" (Freemasons Radio Edit) (3:11)
6. Jordin Sparks and Chris Brown – "No Air" (4:25)
7. Vanessa Amorosi – "Perfect" (4:48)
8. Brian McFadden – "Like Only a Woman Can" (3:51)
9. Britney Spears – "Break the Ice" (3:16)
10. OneRepublic – "Stop and Stare" (3:44)
11. Timbaland featuring Keri Hilson and Nicole Scherzinger – "Scream" (3:46)
12. Sara Bareilles – "Love Song" (4:19)
13. Duffy – "Mercy" (3:40)
14. Pete Murray – "You Pick Me Up" (4:32)
15. Rogue Traders – "What You're On" (3:35)
16. Ashlee Simpson – "Outta My Head (Ay Ya Ya)" (3:38)
17. Delta Goodrem – "You Will Only Break My Heart" (3:03)
18. Pnau – "Baby" (2:46)
19. Soulja Boy – "Yahhh!" (3:10)
20. Psycho Teddy – "Psycho Teddy" (3:07)

=== DVD ===
1. Newton Faulkner – "Dream Catch Me" (3:53)
2. Rihanna – "Take a Bow" (3:47)
3. Mariah Carey – "Touch My Body" (4:18)
4. Jordin Sparks and Chris Brown – "No Air" (4:48)
5. Vanessa Amorosi – "Perfect" (3:12)
6. Leona Lewis – "Better in Time" (3:57)
7. Sara Bareilles – "Love Song" (4:23)
8. Kelly Rowland – "Work" (Freemasons Radio Edit) (3:11)
9. Pnau – "Baby" (2:46)
10. Britney Spears – "Break the Ice" (3:20)
11. Brian McFadden – "Like Only a Woman Can" (3:57)
12. OneRepublic – "Stop and Stare" (4:04)
13. Delta Goodrem – "You Will Only Break My Heart" (3:04)
14. Ashlee Simpson – "Outta My Head (Ay Ya Ya)" (3:47)

== Certifications ==
Region	Certification	Certified units/sales
Australia (ARIA)	2× Platinum	140,000^{^}
^{^} Shipments figures based on certification alone.
