= Erica Packer =

Australian former singer and model (born 1977)

- Also known as: Erica Baxter
- Born: Erica Louise Baxter; 16 August 1977 (age 49)
- Origin: Gunnedah, NSW, Australia
- Genre: Pop
- Occupations: Model singer songwriter
- Instrument: Vocals
- Years active: 2000–present

Erica Louise Baxter (formerly Packer; born 16 August 1977) is an Australian former singer, former model and former second wife of James Packer, Australia's eighth richest man.

== Early life ==
Erica Baxter was born in Gunnedah, northwest New South Wales, on 10 November 1977 and attended the private girls' school Abbotsleigh.

== Music career ==
In 2006, Baxter signed a multiple-album recording contract with Sony BMG Music Australia. Packer began working with ARIA Award-Winning Australian Music Producer Audius Mtawairia who produced most of the album in Sydney, New South Wales. Packer wrote eight tracks for the record. Packer released the Natasha Bedingfield penned first single "I Spy". The track was featured on the Compilation CD So Fresh: The Hits of Summer 2007. The album Through My Eyes was released on 28 April 2007 in Australia and peaked on the Australian Hitseekers Chart at No. 18.

== Personal life ==
She married James Packer on 20 June 2007 after dating on and off for four years. The wedding was at the Antibes town hall, or Hotel de Ville, on the French Riviera. Baxter and Packer have three children. In September 2013, James and Erica Packer announced their separation after six years of marriage.

Prior to her marriage to Packer, Erica was romantically involved with singer and actor Jason Donavan for two years from 1994.

Erica is currently dating French businessman and pharma boss billionaire Sebastian Aguettant.

== Discography ==
=== Albums ===
List of albums, with selected details
Title	Details
Through My Eyes	Released: 2007; Label: Sony BMG (88697012122); Format: CD

=== Singles ===
List of singles, with Australian chart positions
Title	Year	Peak chart positions	Album
Title	Year	AUS	Album
"Dreams" (040 featuring Erica Baxter)	2001	—	Non-album single
"I Spy"	2006	57	Through My Eyes
"I Don't Feel a Thing"	2007	—	Through My Eyes
