= So Fresh: The Hits of Summer 2012 + The Best of 2011 =

Compilation album by Various artists
- Released: 18 November 2011
- Genre: Pop
- Length: 72:50
- Label: Sony Music Australia

So Fresh chronology
So Fresh: The Hits of Spring 2011 (2011)	So Fresh: The Hits of Summer 2012 + The Best of 2011 (2011)	So Fresh: The Hits of Autumn 2012 (2012)

So Fresh: The Hits of Summer 2012 + The Best of 2011 is a two disc compilation that was released on 18 November 2011. It features 41 songs from various artists that were either recent hits or hits throughout the year on the ARIA Charts. It reached number one on the ARIA Compilation Chart.

== Track listing ==
Disc 1

1. Kelly Clarkson – "Mr. Know It All" (3:52)
2. Jessie J – "Domino" (3:51)
3. Adele – "Someone like You" (4:43)
4. Calvin Harris – "Feel So Close" (3:25)
5. Gotye featuring Kimbra – "Somebody That I Used to Know" (4:05)
6. Taio Cruz featuring Flo Rida – "Hangover" (3:41)
7. Alexandra Stan – "Mr. Saxobeat" (3:14)
8. Jessica Mauboy featuring Stan Walker – "Galaxy" (4:04)
9. Natalie Bassingthwaighte – "All We Have" (3:16)
10. The Black Eyed Peas – "The Time (Dirty Bit)" (4:12)
11. Rihanna – "S&M" (4:04)
12. The Wanted – "Glad You Came" (3:15)
13. Dev – "In the Dark" (3:48)
14. Nicole Scherzinger – "Wet" (3:36)
15. Gavin DeGraw – "Not Over You" (3:36)
16. Havana Brown – "Get It" (3:39)
17. Florence and the Machine – "Shake It Out" (3:51)
18. Vanessa Amorosi – "Amazing" (3:35)
19. Justice Crew – "Sexy and You Know It" (3:27)
20. Chris Brown – "Yeah 3x" (4:02)

Disc 2

1. Foster the People – "Pumped Up Kicks" (3:56)
2. Hot Chelle Rae – "I Like It Like That" (No Rap Version) (2:46)
3. LMFAO featuring Lauren Bennett and GoonRock – "Party Rock Anthem" (4:23)
4. Lady Gaga – "Born This Way" (4:21)
5. Pete Murray – "Free" (3:37)
6. Pitbull featuring Ne-Yo, Afrojack and Nayer – "Give Me Everything" (4:14)
7. Stan Walker featuring Static Revenger – "Light It Up" (3:29)
8. Jennifer Lopez – "On the Floor" (No Rap Version) (3:39)
9. Pink – "Raise Your Glass" (3:23)
10. Nicki Minaj featuring Rihanna – "Fly" (3:33)
11. Diddy – Dirty Money featuring Skylar Grey – "Coming Home" (4:00)
12. Example – "Stay Awake" (3:24)
13. Britney Spears – "Criminal" (3:44)
14. Avril Lavigne – "Wish You Were Here" (3:44)
15. Neon Trees – "Animal" (3:06)
16. Guy Sebastian featuring Eve – "Who's That Girl" (3:40)
17. Kesha – "We R Who We R" (3:26)
18. Alexis Jordan – "Happiness" (4:03)
19. Usher – "More" (RedOne Jimmy Joker Remix) (3:40)
20. Leona Lewis and Avicii – "Collide" (4:00)
21. Marvin Priest – "Own This Club" (3:24)

== Year-end charts ==
Chart (2011)	Peak position
Top 50 Compilations (ARIA)	1
Chart (2012)	Peak position
Top 50 Compilations (ARIA)	8
