= So Fresh: The Hits of Autumn 2005 =

Compilation album by Various artists
- Released: 23 March 2005
- Genre: Pop
- Label: Sony BMG

So Fresh chronology
So Fresh: The Hits of Summer 2005 (2004)	So Fresh: The Hits of Autumn 2005 (2005)	So Fresh: The Hits of Winter 2005 (2005)

So Fresh: The Hits of Autumn 2005 is a compilation of songs that were popular in Australia in autumn 2005. It was released on 23 March 2005. The compilation was certified double platinum by the Australian Recording Industry Association (ARIA), denoting shipments of 140,000 copies.

== Track listing ==
1. Jennifer Lopez – "Get Right" (3:45)
2. Nitty – "Nasty Girl" (4:07)
3. Destiny's Child – "Lose My Breath" (4:02)
4. Nelly featuring Tim McGraw – "Over and Over" (4:14)
5. Maroon 5 – "Sunday Morning" (4:02)
6. Delta Goodrem – "Out of the Blue" (4:18)
7. Kelly Clarkson – "Since U Been Gone" (3:09)
8. Good Charlotte – "I Just Wanna Live" (2:46)
9. Michael Gray – "The Weekend" (3:11)
10. Lovefreekz – "Shine" (3:13)
11. Deep Dish – "Flashdance" (3:15)
12. Tammin – "Pointless Relationship" (3:24)
13. Anthony Callea – "The Prayer" (4:13)
14. JoJo featuring Bow Wow – "Baby It's You" (3:35)
15. Natasha Bedingfield – "Unwritten" (3:38)
16. Guy Sebastian – "Kryptonite" (3:59)
17. Casey Donovan – "Listen with Your Heart" (4:00)
18. Ashlee Simpson – "Shadow" (3:57)
19. The Killers – "Mr. Brightside" (3:43)
20. U2 – "Vertigo" (3:12)

== Charts ==
Year	Chart	Peak position
2005	ARIA Compilations Chart	1

== Certifications ==
Country	Provider	Certification
Australia	ARIA	2× Platinum

== See also ==
- So Fresh
