= So Fresh: The Hits of Autumn 2015 =

Compilation album by Various Artists
- Released: 20 March 2015
- Genre: Pop
- Label: Universal Music Australia

So Fresh chronology
So Fresh: The Hits of Summer 2015 (2014)	So Fresh: The Hits of Autumn 2015 (2015)	So Fresh: The Hits of Winter 2015 (2015)

So Fresh: The Hits of Autumn 2015 is a compilation album which has 24 tracks that each have charted in the top 40 on the ARIA Singles Chart. The album was released on 20 March 2015, and peaked at number one on the ARIA Compilations Chart where it remained for eight weeks. By the end of April it was certified gold for shipment of 35,000 units.

== Track listing ==
Standard edition
No.	Title	Artist(s)	Length
1.	"Uptown Funk" (featuring Bruno Mars)	Mark Ronson	4:30
2.	"Cheerleader" (Felix Jaehn Remix) (Radio Edit)	OMI	3:00
3.	"Take Me to Church"	Hozier	4:01
4.	"Hold Back the River"	James Bay	4:03
5.	"The Nights"	Avicii	2:56
6.	"Pray to God" (featuring HAIM)	Calvin Harris	3:52
7.	"Sugar"	Maroon 5	3:55
8.	"Dear Future Husband"	Meghan Trainor	3:04
9.	"Masterpiece"	Jessie J	3:40
10.	"Blame It on Me"	George Ezra	3:16
11.	"Jealous" (Radio Edit)	Labrinth	4:02
12.	"6 Words"	Wretch 32	3:33
13.	"Fade Out Lines"	The Avener and Phoebe Killdeer	3:14
14.	"Wish You Were Mine" (Radio Edit)	Philip George	2:57
15.	"Sugar Man"	Yolanda Be Cool and DCUP	2:40
16.	"I'm an Albatraoz"	AronChupa	2:46
17.	"Ah Yeah So What" (featuring Wiley and Elen Levon) (Radio Edit)	Will Sparks	3:15
18.	"One Last Time"	Ariana Grande	3:17
19.	"The Day Before I Met You"	Jessica Mauboy	3:33
20.	"Jealous"	Nick Jonas	3:42
21.	"Lighthouse"	G.R.L.	3:36
22.	"Lay Me Down"	Sam Smith	4:13

iTunes Store bonus tracks
No.	Title	Artist(s)	Length
23.	"The Nights" (Mike Mago Remix)	Avicii	4:42
24.	"Cheerleader" (Ricky Blaze Remix)	OMI	3:03

Deluxe edition DVD
No.	Title	Artist(s)	Length
1.	"Uptown Funk" (featuring Bruno Mars) (Music Video)	Mark Ronson
2.	"Cheerleader" (Felix Jaehn Remix) (Music Video)	OMI
3.	"Hold Back the River" (Music Video)	James Bay
4.	"The Nights" (Music Video)	Avicii
5.	"Pray to God" (featuring HAIM) (Music Video)	Calvin Harris
6.	"Sugar" (Music Video)	Maroon 5
7.	"Masterpiece" (Music Video)	Jessie J
8.	"Blame It on Me" (Music Video)	George Ezra
9.	"Jealous" (Music Video)	Labrinth
10.	"Fade Out Lines" (Music Video)	The Avener and Phoebe Killdeer
11.	"One Last Time" (Music Video)	Ariana Grande
12.	"The Day Before I Met You" (Music Video)	Jessica Mauboy
