= So Fresh: The Hits of Spring 2005 =

Compilation album by Various artists
- Released: 18 September 2005
- Genre: Pop
- Label: Sony BMG

So Fresh chronology
So Fresh: The Hits of Winter 2005 (2005)	So Fresh: The Hits of Spring 2005 (2005)	So Fresh: The Hits of Summer 2006 (2005)

So Fresh: The Hits of Spring 2005 is a compilation of songs that were popular in Australia in spring 2005. It was released on 18 September 2005.

== Track listing ==
1. 2Pac featuring Elton John – "Ghetto Gospel" (3:59)
2. Akon – "Lonely" (3:34)
3. Backstreet Boys – "Incomplete" (3:59)
4. The Black Eyed Peas – "Don't Phunk with My Heart" (4:00)
5. Gwen Stefani – "Hollaback Girl" (3:20)
6. Mario – "Here I Go Again" (3:21)
7. Amerie – "1 Thing" (4:00)
8. Nelly – "'N' Dey Say" (3:27)
9. Kelly Clarkson – "Behind These Hazel Eyes" (3:16)
10. Delta Goodrem – "A Little Too Late" (3:27)
11. Anthony Callea – "Hurts So Bad" (3:03)
12. Random – "Put Your Hands Up" (3:27)
13. Eminem – "Mockingbird" (4:11)
14. Kanye West – "Diamonds from Sierra Leone" (4:00)
15. Martin Solveig – "Everybody" (4:16)
16. Freemasons featuring Amanda Wilson – "Love on My Mind" (3:00)
17. Jem – "They" (3:15)
18. Tammin – "It's a Beautiful Thing" (3:15)
19. The Killers – "All These Things That I've Done" (3:49)
20. Schnappi – "Schnappi, das kleine Krokodil" (2:10)

== Charts ==
Year	Chart	Peak position	Certification
2005	ARIA Compilations Chart	1	2xPlatinum

== See also ==
- So Fresh
