= So Fresh: The Hits of Summer 2001 =

Compilation album by Various Artists
- Released: 27 November 2000
- Genre: Pop
- Label: Sony BMG Music Entertainment

So Fresh chronology
So Fresh: The Hits of Spring 2000 (2000)	So Fresh: The Hits of Summer 2001 (2000)	So Fresh: The Hits of Autumn 2001 (2001)

So Fresh: The Hits of Summer 2001 is a compilation of the latest songs that were popular in Australia at the time of release. It was released in November 2000.

== Track listing ==
=== CD 1 ===
1. Christina Aguilera – "Come On Over Baby (All I Want Is You)" (3:25)
2. Mary Mary – "Shackles (Praise You)" (3:19)
3. Samantha Mumba – "Gotta Tell You" (3:21)
4. Wheatus – "Teenage Dirtbag" (4:03)
5. Bomfunk MC's – "B-Boys & Flygirls" (Y2K Mix) (3:15)
6. Five + Queen – "We Will Rock You" (3:09)
7. Jennifer Lopez – "Let's Get Loud" (4:00)
8. Modjo – "Lady (Hear Me Tonight)" (3:45)
9. Destiny's Child – "Jumpin', Jumpin'" (3:49)
10. A1 – "Take On Me" (3:33)
11. True Steppers and Dane Bowers featuring Victoria Beckham – "Out of Your Mind" (3:26)
12. Girl Thing – "Last One Standing" (3:38)
13. Ronan Keating – "Life Is a Rollercoaster" (3:56)
14. Mandy Moore – "I Wanna Be with You" (4:14)
15. Leah Haywood – "Crazy" (3:08)
16. Toni Braxton – "Spanish Guitar" (Mousse T.'s Radio Mix) (4:04)
17. Nine Days – "Absolutely (Story of a Girl)" (3:15)
18. Daphne and Celeste – "U.G.L.Y." (3:25)
19. S Club 7 – "Two in a Million" (3:35)
20. Bond – "Victory" (4:40)

=== CD 2 ===
1. Anastacia – "I'm Outta Love" (3:48)
2. Bon Jovi – "Say It Isn't So" (3:33)
3. Pink – "There You Go" (3:24)
4. Naughty by Nature featuring Phiness – "Holiday" (4:08)
5. Sisqó featuring Beanie Sigel – "Unleash the Dragon" (3:54)
6. Chicane featuring Bryan Adams – "Don't Give Up" (3:41)
7. Aneiki – "Pleased to Meet You" (3:51)
8. Aqua – "Cartoon Heroes" (3:40)
9. Enrique Iglesias – "Be with You" (3:40)
10. Coco Lee – "Wherever You Go" (3:52)
11. Lara Fabian – "I Will Love Again" (3:45)
12. Jessica Simpson – "I Wanna Love You Forever" (4:25)
13. Human Nature – "Be There with You" (3:53)
14. Bachelor Girl – "Permission to Shine" (4:18)
15. Brian McKnight – "Back at One" (3:23)
16. Boyz II Men – "Pass You By" (4:04)
17. 98 Degrees – "I Do (Cherish You)" (3:47)
18. Hanson – "If Only" (4:31)
19. Blink-182 – "All the Small Things" (2:49)
20. Frenzal Rhomb – "War" (2:30)

== Charts ==
Year	Chart	Peak position	Certification
2000	ARIA Compilation Chart	1	4× Platinum
