= So Fresh: The Hits of Spring 2006 =

Compilation album by Various artists
- Released: 18 September 2006
- Genre: Pop
- Label: Sony BMG

So Fresh chronology
So Fresh: The Hits of Winter 2006 (2006)	So Fresh: The Hits of Spring 2006 (2006)	So Fresh: The Hits of Summer 2007 (2006)

So Fresh: The Hits of Spring 2006 is part of the So Fresh album series. It was released in Australia on 18 September 2006.

== Track listing ==
1. Shakira featuring Wyclef Jean – "Hips Don't Lie" (3:38)
2. Christina Aguilera – "Ain't No Other Man" (3:48)
3. Rihanna – "Unfaithful" (3:47)
4. Stephanie McIntosh – "Mistake" (3:20)
5. Nick Lachey – "What's Left of Me" (4:05)
6. Pink – "Who Knew" (3:28)
7. The Pussycat Dolls featuring Snoop Dogg – "Buttons" (3:53)
8. Beyoncé – "Déjà Vu" (3:24)
9. Ne-Yo – "Sexy Love" (3:40)
10. Jessica Simpson – "A Public Affair" (3:21)
11. Shannon Noll – "Lonely" (4:43)
12. Keane – "Is It Any Wonder?" (3:05)
13. Sandi Thom – "I Wish I Was a Punk Rocker (With Flowers in My Hair)" (2:33)
14. The Fray – "Over My Head (Cable Car)" (3:57)
15. Teddy Geiger – "For You I Will (Confidence)" (3:49)
16. Nickelback – "Animals" (3:05)
17. Bernard Fanning – "Watch Over Me" (3:31)
18. Snow Patrol – "You're All I Have" (4:32)
19. The All-American Rejects – "Move Along" (3:57)
20. The Grates – "19-20-20" (2:04)
21. Paulini – "I Believe" (3:13)
22. Nelly featuring Paul Wall and Ali & Gipp – "Grillz" (3:47)

== Charts ==
Year	Chart	Peak position	Certification
2006	ARIA Compilations Chart	1	2xPlatinum

== See also ==
- So Fresh
- 2006 in music
