= So Fresh: The Hits of Spring 2014 =

Compilation album by Various artists
- Released: 12 September 2014
- Genre: Pop
- Label: Universal Music Australia

Various artists chronology
So Fresh: The Hits of Winter 2014 (2014)	So Fresh: The Hits of Spring 2014 (2014)	So Fresh: The Hits of Summer 2015 (2014)

So Fresh: The Hits of Spring 2014 is a compilation that features 23 songs that have charted the top 40 on the ARIA Charts. The album was released on 12 September 2014.

== Track listing ==
CD
No.	Title	Artist	Length
1.	"All About That Bass" (Radio Disney Version)	Meghan Trainor	3:07
2.	"Ugly Heart"	G.R.L.	3:17
3.	"We Are Done"	The Madden Brothers	3:34
4.	"Bang Bang"	Jessie J, Ariana Grande, and Nicki Minaj	3:16
5.	"Budapest"	George Ezra	3:20
6.	"Only Love Can Hurt Like This"	Paloma Faith	3:51
7.	"Ghost"	Ella Henderson	3:35
8.	"I'm Ready"	AJR	3:46
9.	"It's My Birthday" (featuring Cody Wise)	will.i.am	4:12
10.	"Break Free" (featuring Zedd)	Ariana Grande	3:34
11.	"Jubel" (Radio Edit)	Klingande	3:19
12.	"Black Widow" (featuring Rita Ora)	Iggy Azalea	3:29
13.	"Come Get It Bae" (Clean Version)	Pharrell Williams	3:21
14.	"Pills n Potions" (Explicit Version)	Nicki Minaj	4:26
15.	"Gladiator"	Dami Im	3:40
16.	"Stay High" (featuring Hippie Sabotage) (Habits Remix)	Tove Lo	4:17
17.	"Nobody to Love"	Sigma	3:09
18.	"Superheroes"	The Script	4:02
19.	"Happy Little Pill"	Troye Sivan	3:42
20.	"I'm Not the Only One" (Radio Edit)	Sam Smith	3:24
21.	"Already Gone"	Taylor Henderson	3:07
22.	"Gladiator" (7th Heaven Pop Mix)	Dami Im	3:45
23.	"I'm Not the Only One" (Armand Van Helden Remix)	Sam Smith	6:34

== Charts ==
Chart (2014)	Peak position
Australian ARIA Compilations Chart	1

=== Year-end charts ===
Chart (2014)	Peak position
Australian ARIA Compilations Chart	2

== Certifications ==
Region	Certification	Certified units/sales
Australia (ARIA)	Platinum	70,000^{^}
^{^} Shipments figures based on certification alone.
