= So Fresh: The Hits of Summer 2015 =

Compilation album by Various artists
- Released: 28 November 2014
- Genre: Pop
- Label: Universal Music Australia

Various artists chronology
So Fresh: The Hits of Spring 2014 (2014)	So Fresh: The Hits of Summer 2015 (2014)	So Fresh: The Hits of Autumn 2015 (2015)

So Fresh: The Hits of Summer 2015 is a compilation that features 21 songs that have charted the top 40 on the ARIA Charts. The album was released on 28 November 2014.

== Track listing ==
The Hits of Summer 2015
No.	Title	Artist	Length
1.	"You Ruin Me"	The Veronicas	3:50
2.	"The Days" (Radio Edit)	Avicii	3:45
3.	"Can I Get a Moment?"	Jessica Mauboy	3:25
4.	"Coming Back"	Dean Ray	3:17
5.	"Stand by You"	Marlisa	3:12
6.	"Heroes (We Could Be)" (featuring Tove Lo)	Alesso	3:29
7.	"Blame" (featuring John Newman)	Calvin Harris	3:34
8.	"Rise & Fall"	Justice Crew	3:44
9.	"Cosby Sweater"	Hilltop Hoods	3:37
10.	"Shower"	Becky G	3:26
11.	"Live Louder"	Nathaniel	3:09
12.	"This Is How We Do"	Katy Perry	3:24
13.	"Bump and Grind 2014" (featuring Rick Ross)	Waze & Odyssey and R. Kelly	3:00
14.	"Wicked Games" (featuring Anna Naklab) (Radio Edit)	Parra for Cuva	3:15
15.	"Take Me Over" (featuring SAFIA)	Peking Duk	3:28
16.	"Changing" (featuring Paloma Faith) (Radio Edit)	Sigma	3:11
17.	"Anaconda"	Nicki Minaj	4:20
18.	"Beg For It" (featuring MØ)	Iggy Azalea	2:58
19.	"Love Me Harder"	Ariana Grande and The Weeknd	3:56
20.	"I'm So Excited" (featuring will.i.am and Cody Wise)	Anja Nissen	3:39
21.	"Ready for the Good Life"	Paloma Faith	3:25

== Charts ==
Chart (2014)	Peak position
Australian ARIA Compilations Chart	1

=== Year-end charts ===
Chart (2014)	Peak position
Australian ARIA Compilations Chart	1

== Certifications ==
Region	Certification	Certified units/sales
Australia (ARIA)	2× Platinum	140,000^{^}
^{^} Shipments figures based on certification alone.
