= Joy Enriquez (album) =

Studio album by Joy Enriquez
- Released: September 25, 2001
- Genre: R&B; pop; Latin
- Length: 50:23
- Label: Arista
- Producer: Antonio "L.A." Reid (exec.); Kenneth "Babyface" Edmonds (also exec.); Pete "LUV" Farmer (exec.); Beyoncé; Steve Morales; David Siegel; Soulshock & Karlin; Fred Jerkins III; LaShawn Daniels; Chris "Dip-Q" Jennings; Danny Sembello; Eric "Donavan East" Johnson; Marti Sharron; Ian Prince

Joy Enriquez chronology
Joy Enriquez (2001)	Atmosphere of Heaven (2006)

Singles from Joy Enriquez
- 1. "How Can I Not Love You" Released: 1999; 2. "Tell Me How You Feel" Released: 2000; 3. "Shake Up the Party" Released: April 17, 2001; 4. "What Do You Want" Released: August 21, 2001

Alternative cover
- Australian cover

Joy Enriquez is the debut studio album from American singer Joy Enriquez. The album was released in September 2001.

== Critical reception ==
Professional ratings
Review scores
Source	Rating
AllMusic	3/5 stars
MTV Asia	8/10

Jonathan Widran from AllMusic said; "She's given great intensely hooky surefire pop hits written and produced by heavyweights like Soulshock & Karlin and Babyface, and there's even a fun little gem with a perky Latin groove "Shake up the Party" to pay homage to her heritage and yes, she can sing, sometimes sensually, sometimes showing some range that could hint at a poor man's Mariah Carey-type niche, but really, this rises on the success of the grooves and hooks. "What Do You Want" is a bouncy declaration that she's giving listeners the best she can, so they have to admire that. "Tell Me How You Feel" has a classic soul feel, with a few Mariah Carey-like moments. The first ballad, "Without You," gives her voice a shot to soar, which helps temper the clichés. Overall, lots of fun, and the pink packaging helps listeners think "party." Pop music and this type of stuff in particular being fickle as it is, the question will be how long Enriquez can keep the party going."

== Track listing ==
No.	Title	Writer(s)	Producer(s)	Length
1.	"What Do You Want"	Beyoncé Knowles; Steve Morales; David Siegel	Knowles; Morales; Siegel	3:54
2.	"Tell Me How You Feel"	Carsten Schack; Channette M. Higgens; Channoah L. Higgens; Gus Redmond; Jeffrey Simon; Joy Enriquez; Kenneth Karlin; Larry Brownlee	Soulshock & Karlin	403
3.	"I Can't Believe"	S. Johnson; Fred Jerkins III; LaShawn Daniels	F. Jerkins; Daniels	4:24
4.	"Situation"	Kenneth "Babyface" Edmonds; Adam Reily	Babyface	3:27
5.	"Shake Up the Party"	Chris "Dip-Q" Jennings; Danny Sembello; Eric "Donavan East" Johnson; Marti Sharron	Jennings; Sembello; Johnson; Sharron	3:31
6.	"Without You"	Ian Prince	Prince	5:00
7.	"I Don't Want You"	F. Johnson; Jerkins; Daniels	F. Jerkins; Daniels	3:58
8.	"Someday"	Babyface	Babyface	3:49
9.	"Just When I Needed You"	Ian Prince	Prince	3:19
10.	"Between You and Me"	F. Jerkins; Daniels; Rodney Jerkins	F. Jerkins; Daniels	3:42
11.	"Uh Oh"	Kara DioGuardi; Morales; Siegel	Morales	4:08
12.	"Losin' the Love"	Babyface; Marc Nelson	Babyface	4:41
13.	"With This Love"	Gustav Holst; Prince	Prince	3:44
14.	"How Can I Not Love You" (from Anna and the King)	George Fenton; Babyface; Robert Kraft	Babyface	3:34

Note

- NB: Tracks 1 and 11 were included on the US release only.

Sample credits

- "Tell Me How You Feel" contains an excerpt from "Mellow Mellow Right on" as performed by Lowrell.
- "With This Love" contains excerpts from "The Planets" as composed by Gustav Holst.

== Charts ==
Chart performance for Joy Enriquez
Chart (2001)	Peak position
Australian Albums (ARIA)	79
New Zealand Albums (RMNZ)	31
