= So Fresh: The Hits of Winter 2014 =

Compilation album by Various artists
- Released: 13 June 2014
- Genre: Pop
- Label: Universal Music Australia

Various artists chronology
So Fresh: The Hits of Autumn 2014 (2014)	So Fresh: The Hits of Winter 2014 (2014)	So Fresh: The Hits of Spring 2014 (2014)

So Fresh: The Hits of Winter 2014 is a compilation that features 24 songs that have charted the top 40 on the ARIA Charts. The album was released on 13 June 2014. In 2014, the album was certified platinum in Australia.

== Track listing ==
CD
No.	Title	Artist	Length
1.	"Que Sera"	Justice Crew	3:31
2.	"Problem" (featuring Iggy Azalea)	Ariana Grande	3:14
3.	"Don't Stop"	5 Seconds of Summer	2:50
4.	"Stolen Dance" (Radio Edit)	Milky Chance	3:22
5.	"Stay with Me"	Sam Smith	2:54
6.	"I Will Never Let You Down"	Rita Ora	3:24
7.	"Fancy" (featuring Charli XCX)	Iggy Azalea	3:18
8.	"Not a Bad Thing" (Radio Edit)	Justin Timberlake	4:26
9.	"Waves" (Robin Schulz Radio Edit)	Mr Probz	3:27
10.	"Summer"	Calvin Harris	3:42
11.	"Faded"	ZHU	3:43
12.	"Lay Me Down"	Avicii	5:00
13.	"Wild Wild Love" (featuring G.R.L.)	Pitbull	3:22
14.	"Birthday"	Katy Perry	3:34
15.	"Never Be the Same"	Jessica Mauboy	3:52
16.	"Up!"	Samantha Jade	3:27
17.	"Replay"	Zendaya	3:30
18.	"Marilyn Monroe" (Radio Edit)	Pharrell Williams	3:43
19.	"Super Love"	Dami Im	3:24
20.	"Love Runs Out"	OneRepublic	3:45
21.	"Selfie"	The Chainsmokers	3:04
22.	"High" (featuring Nicole Millar)	Peking Duk	3:48
23.	"Stay with Me" (Shy FX Remix)	Sam Smith	3:32
24.	"Up!" (7th Heaven Club Mix)	Samantha Jade	6:37

== Charts ==
Chart (2014)	Peak position
Australian ARIA Compilations Chart	1

=== Year-end charts ===
Chart (2014)	Peak position
Australian ARIA Compilations Chart	4

== Certifications ==
Region	Certification	Certified units/sales
Australia (ARIA)	Platinum	70,000^{^}
^{^} Shipments figures based on certification alone.
