= So Fresh: The Hits of Summer 2016 =

Compilation album by Various artists
- Released: 27 November 2015
- Genre: Pop
- Label: Sony Music Entertainment Australia; Universal Music Australia

Various artists chronology
So Fresh: The Hits of Spring 2015 (2015)	So Fresh: The Hits of Summer 2016 (2016)	So Fresh: The Hits of Autumn 2016 (2016)

So Fresh: The Hits of Summer 2016 is a 21 track compilation album by Various Artists that was released through Sony Music Entertainment Australia and Universal Music Australia on 27 November 2015. A two disc deluxe edition of the album, So Fresh: The Hits of Summer 2016 + The Best of 2015, features a total of 43 tracks. Since its release, the compilation has been certified Platinum by ARIA.

== Track listing ==
Hits of Summer 2016
No.	Title	Artist(s)	Length
1.	"Sorry"	Justin Bieber	3:22
2.	"On My Mind"	Ellie Goulding	3:35
3.	"Locked Away" (featuring Adam Levine)	R. City	3:49
4.	"The Fix" (featuring Jeremih)	Nelly	2:55
5.	"Dessert"	Dawin	3:33
6.	"Ocean Drive"	Duke Dumont	3:27
7.	"Ain't Nobody (Loves Me Better)" (featuring Jasmine Thompson)	Felix Jaehn	3:07
8.	"Broken Arrows"	Avicii	3:54
9.	"Easy Love" (Radio Edit)	Sigala	2:41
10.	"Today's the Day"	P!nk	3:47
11.	"This Ain't Love"	Jessica Mauboy	3:29
12.	"Hula Hoop"	OMI	3:28
13.	"Cake by the Ocean" (Clean Version)	DNCE	3:40
14.	"WILD"	Troye Sivan	3:50
15.	"I'd Go with You Anywhere"	Birds of Tokyo	3:21
16.	"Hey Everybody!"	5 Seconds of Summer	3:18
17.	"Stitches"	Shawn Mendes	3:29
18.	"Good for You" (featuring ASAP Rocky)	Selena Gomez	3:42
19.	"Renegades"	X Ambassadors	3:17
20.	"Writing's on the Wall"	Sam Smith	3:48
21.	"Better When I'm Dancin'"	Meghan Trainor	2:55

The Hits of 2016 and The Best of 2015 (Disc one)
No.	Title	Artist(s)	Length
1.	"Sorry"	Justin Bieber	3:19
2.	"Wings"	Delta Goodrem	3:26
3.	"Bills"	LunchMoney Lewis	3:23
4.	"I'm an Albatraoz"	AronChupa	2:46
5.	"Dessert"	Dawin	3:30
6.	"Shut Up and Dance"	WALK THE MOON	3:17
7.	"One Last Time"	Ariana Grande	3:16
8.	"Sugar"	Maroon 5	3:54
9.	"The Fix" (featuring Jeremih)	Nelly	2:53
10.	"Do It Again"	Pia Mia featuring Chris Brown	3:09
11.	"This Ain't Love"	Jessica Mauboy	3:27
12.	"Worth It" (featuring Kid Ink)	Fifth Harmony	3:43
13.	"Good for You" (featuring ASAP Rocky)	Selena Gomez	3:40
14.	"Today's the Day"	P!nk	3:44
15.	"Hey Everybody!"	5 Seconds of Summer	3:16
16.	"WILD"	Troye Sivan	3:47
17.	"Lighthouse"	G.R.L.	3:35
18.	"Somebody" (featuring Jeremih)	Natalie La Rose	3:08
19.	"Stitches"	Shawn Mendes	3:26
20.	"Trouble" (featuring Jennifer Hudson)	Iggy Azalea	2:45
21.	"Better When I'm Dancin'"	Meghan Trainor	2:55
22.	"Writing's on the Wall"	Sam Smith	3:45

The Hits of 2016 and The Best of 2015 (Disc two)
No.	Title	Artist(s)	Length
1.	"On My Mind"	Ellie Goulding	3:33
2.	"You Don't Own Me" (featuring G-Eazy)	Grace	3:19
3.	"Locked Away" (featuring Adam Levine)	R. City	3:46
4.	"Take Me to Church"	Hozier	4:01
5.	"Hold Back the River"	James Bay	3:58
6.	"Georgia"	Vance Joy	3:49
7.	"Hula Hoop"	OMI	3:25
8.	"Ain't Nobody (Loves Me Better)" (featuring Jasmine Thompson)	Felix Jaehn	3:05
9.	"Broken Arrows"	Avicii	3:51
10.	"Firestone" (featuring Conrad Sewell)	Kygo	4:31
11.	"Ocean Drive"	Duke Dumont	3:25
12.	"Easy Love" (Radio Edit)	Sigala	2:38
13.	"King"	Years & Years	3:33
14.	"Cake by the Ocean" (Clean Version)	DNCE	3:38
15.	"Masterpiece"	Jessie J	3:39
16.	"Jealous"	Nick Jonas	3:42
17.	"Five More Hours"	Deorro and Chris Brown	3:32
18.	"Nobody Love"	Tori Kelly	3:22
19.	"I'd Go with You Anywhere"	Birds of Tokyo	3:19
20.	"Renegades"	X Ambassadors	3:14
21.	"Say My Name" (featuring Derek Siow)	Peking Duk	3:06

== Charts ==
=== Weekly charts ===
Chart (2015)	Position
Australia (ARIA) Top 20 Compilations	1

=== Year-end charts ===
Chart (2015)	Position
Australia (ARIA) Top 50 Compilations	4

== Certifications ==
Region	Certification	Certified units/sales
Australia (ARIA)	Platinum	70,000^{^}
^{^} Shipments figures based on certification alone.
