= So Fresh: The Hits of Winter 2011 =

Compilation album by Various artists
- Released: 17 June 2011
- Genre: Pop
- Label: Sony Music

Various artists chronology
So Fresh: The Hits of Autumn 2011 (2011)	So Fresh: The Hits of Winter 2011 (2011)	So Fresh: The Hits of Spring 2011 (2011)

So Fresh: The Hits of Winter 2011 is an Australian compilation album. It was released on 17 June 2011. ARIA accredited this album as platinum. It achieved the fourth position on the Australian compilation chart for 2011.

== Track listing ==
CD

1. Jennifer Lopez featuring Pitbull – "On the Floor" (3:50)
2. Pitbull featuring Ne-Yo, Afrojack and Nayer – "Give Me Everything" (4:16)
3. Jessie J featuring B.o.B – "Price Tag" (3:42)
4. Rihanna – "California King Bed" (4:12)
5. Lady Gaga – "Judas" (4:09)
6. Chris Brown featuring Benny Benassi – "Beautiful People" (3:45)
7. Havana Brown – "We Run the Night" (3:36)
8. Marvin Priest – "Own This Club" (3:23)
9. Britney Spears – "Till the World Ends" (3:58)
10. The Black Eyed Peas – "Just Can't Get Enough" (3:40)
11. The Potbelleez – "From the Music" (3:11)
12. Avril Lavigne – "What the Hell" (3:39)
13. Kesha – "Blow" (3:40)
14. Stan Walker – "Loud" (3:23)
15. Nicole Scherzinger – "Don't Hold Your Breath" (3:18)
16. Alexis Jordan – "Good Girl" (3:56)
17. Justice Crew featuring Flo Rida – "Dance with Me" (3:44)
18. Wes Carr – "Been a Long Time" (3:06)
19. Martin Solveig featuring Kele – "Ready 2 Go" (3:03)
20. Mike Posner – "Bow Chicka Wow Wow" (3:15)

DVD

1. Jennifer Lopez featuring Pitbull – "On the Floor"
2. Pitbull featuring Ne-Yo, Afrojack and Nayer – "Give Me Everything"
3. Jessie J featuring B.o.B – "Price Tag"
4. Rihanna – "California King Bed"
5. Chris Brown featuring Benny Benassi – "Beautiful People"
6. Havana Brown – "We Run the Night"
7. Marvin Priest – "Own This Club"
8. Britney Spears – "Till the World Ends"
9. Avril Lavigne – "What the Hell"
10. Kesha – "Blow"
11. Nicole Scherzinger – "Don't Hold Your Breath"
12. Justice Crew featuring Flo Rida – "Dance with Me"
