= Joy Enriquez =

American singer and actress

- Genres: Pop; Latin pop; R&B; CCM
- Occupations: Singer; actress
- Years active: 1998–present
- Labels: Arista; JoyfulChild; Lifestyle Music Group
- Spouse: Rodney "Darkchild" Jerkins (m. 2004)

Joy Enriquez is an American singer and actress who has appeared on the television series 7th Heaven and also starred in films such as Chasing Papi and Lady and the Tramp II: Scamp's Adventure (voice). Enriquez was also a background singer on the single "When You Believe", a duet by Whitney Houston and Mariah Carey.

== Biography ==
On April 4, 2004, Enriquez married record producer Rodney Jerkins, who had worked on her debut album. Their first child is Rodney David Jerkins Jr. Their second child is daughter Heavenly Joy Jerkins. Their third child is Hannah Joy Jerkins.

After almost completing a follow-up album in the same Pop/R&B vein as her debut, which would have featured the leaked track "It's So Funny", a collaboration with Mase, Joy had a change of heart about the musical direction she wished to pursue. She decided that her next release should be an inspirational/contemporary Christian music record. The ensuing album, Atmosphere of Heaven, was released on March 7, 2006 on the independent label JoyfulChild, which was formed by Jerkins and Enriquez.

In 2010, she wrote the track "Boom Chika Boom" for the Our Family Wedding soundtrack, and performed/wrote the song "Beatz Be Rockin'" for the Nickelodeon iCarly series.

She contributed songs to the Lifetime series Dance Moms in 2012 with the track "Light My Fire" getting a separate digital single release.

In 2013, her reality series House of Joy premiered on the NUVOtv network on July 18, 2013. After each episode, a new digital single would be released on digital services. These eight songs, along with the theme song, were released on an EP, House of Joy, on September 10, 2013.

In 2015, she released two digital singles: "Hallelujah" featuring Lindsey Stirling and "Shine" featuring her daughter Heavenly Joy. Her third studio album The Call was released on January 15, 2016.

== Discography ==
=== Studio albums ===
| Year | Album details | Chart positions | |
| Year | Album details | AUS | NZ |
|---|---|---|---|
| 2001 | Joy Enriquez: Released: September 25, 2001; Label: LaFace/Arista | 79 | 31 |
| 2006 | Atmosphere of Heaven: Released: June 3, 2006; Label: JoyfulChild | — | — |
| 2016 | The Call: Released: January 15, 2016; Label: Lifestyle Music Group | — | — |

=== EPs ===
| Year | Details |
|---|---|
| 2013 | House of Joy: Released: September 10, 2013; Label: Lifestyle Music Group |

=== Singles ===
| Year | Single | Chart positions | | | | Certification | Album |
| Year | Single | US Dance | US Rhythmic | AUS | NZ | Certification | Album |
|---|---|---|---|---|---|---|---|
| 1999 | "How Can I Not Love You"^{[B]} | — | — | — | — | | Joy Enriquez (all editions) |
| 2000 | "Tell Me How You Feel" | — | 31 | 24 | 14 | RMNZ: Gold | Joy Enriquez (all editions) |
| 2001 | "Shake Up the Party" | 23 | — | 57 | 45 | | Joy Enriquez (all editions) |
| 2001 | "What Do You Want" | — | — | — | — | | Joy Enriquez (all editions) |
| 2006 | "Get to Know Him" | — | — | — | — | | Atmosphere of Heaven |
| 2006 | "Been So Good" | — | — | — | — | | Atmosphere of Heaven |
| 2015 | "Hallelujah" (featuring Lindsey Stirling) | — | — | — | — | | The Call |
| 2015 | "Shine" (featuring Heavenly Joy) | — | — | — | — | | The Call |

Notes

- "—" denotes releases that did not chart or were not released in that country.
- A Joy Enriquez was re-released in Japan and United States in a different album cover and track listing.
- B Song was also included on Anna and the King movie soundtrack as a theme song.

=== Soundtracks ===
| Year | Song | Film |
|---|---|---|
| 1998 | "When You Believe" (background vocals) | The Prince of Egypt |
| 1999 | "How Can I Not Love You" | Anna and the King |
| 2001 | "Shake Up the Party" | Double Take |
| 2001 | "Bella Notte (This Is the Night)" (with Carlos Ponce) | Lady and the Tramp II: Scamp's Adventure |
| 2002 | "Shake Up the Party" | Boat Trip |
| 2003 | "Bad Girls" | Chasing Papi |
2010
| 2010 | "Beatz Be Rockin'" | iCarly |

== Personal life ==
Enriquez has been married to producer Rodney Jerkins since April 4, 2004, and they have four children.

In 2015, Enriquez's daughter, Heavenly Joy, was a contestant on season 10 of America's Got Talent.

== Filmography ==
=== Film ===
| Year | Film | Role | Notes |
|---|---|---|---|
| 2001 | Lady and the Tramp II: Scamp's Adventure | | Voice role |
| 2003 | Chasing Papi | Mary | |

=== Television ===
| Year | Title | Role | Notes |
|---|---|---|---|
| 1989 | Star Search | Herself | Contestant |
| 2000 | Music in High Places | Herself | Episode "Joy Enriquez in Puerto Rico" |
| 2001 | The Bold and the Beautiful | Herself | 1 episode |
| 2001 | Resurrection Blvd. | Herself | Episode "Con Cuidado" |
| 2001—2002 | 7th Heaven | Joy Reyes | 6 episodes |
| 2013 | House of Joy | Herself | 8 episodes |
