= Tell Me How You Feel =

2000 single by Joy Enriquez

Single by Joy Enriquez

from the album Joy Enriquez
- Released: September 19, 2000
- Length: 4:09
- Label: Arista
- Songwriters: Kenneth Karlin; Anthem; Carsten Shack; Larry Brownlee; Gus Redmond; Fred Simon; Joy Enriquez; Jeffrey Simon
- Producers: Soulshock; Kenneth Karlin

Joy Enriquez singles chronology
| "How Can I Not Love You" (1999) | "Tell Me How You Feel" (2000) | "Shake Up the Party" (2001) |

Music video
- "Tell Me How You Feel" on YouTube

"Tell Me How You Feel" is a song by American singer and actress Joy Enriquez. It samples "Mellow Mellow Right On" by Lowrell Simon. The song was released as the second single from her debut self-titled studio album in September 2000, peaking at number 17 on the US Billboard Bubbling Under R&B/Hip-Hop Songs chart, number 24 in Australia and number 14 in New Zealand, where it was certified gold for sales of over 5,000.

== Track listings ==
US CD single

1. "Tell Me How You Feel" – 4:06
2. Snippets from Joy Enriquez
  1. "Shake Up the Party"
  2. "Situation"
  3. "I Can't Believe"

Australian maxi-CD single

1. "Tell Me How You Feel" – 4:06
2. "Tell Me How You Feel" (Full Crew remix) – 4:04
3. "Between You and Me" – 4:21
4. "How Can I Not Love You" – 4:33

European CD single

1. "Tell Me How You Feel" (album version) – 4:06
2. "Tell Me How You Feel" (Full Crew remix) – 4:05

European maxi-CD single

1. "Tell Me How You Feel" (album version) – 4:06
2. "Tell Me How You Feel" (Full Crew remix) – 4:05
3. "Dime mi amor" (Spanish version) – 3:59
4. "Tell Me How You Feel" (instrumental) – 4:05

Japanese CD single

1. "Tell Me How You Feel"
2. "How Can I Not Love You"

== Charts ==
| Chart (2000–2001) | Peak position |
|---|---|
| Australia (ARIA) | 24 |
| Australian Urban (ARIA) | 9 |
| New Zealand (Recorded Music NZ) | 14 |
| US Rhythmic Top 40 (Billboard) | 31 |

== Certifications ==
| Region | Certification | Certified units/sales |
|---|---|---|
| New Zealand (RMNZ) | Gold | 5,000^{*} |
^{*} Sales figures based on certification alone.

== Release history ==
| Region | Date | Format(s) | Label(s) | Ref(s). |
|---|---|---|---|---|
| United States | September 19, 2000 | Rhythmic contemporary; contemporary hit radio | Arista | |
| United States | September 26, 2000 | Urban contemporary radio | Arista | |
| Japan | December 6, 2000 | CD | Arista | |
| Australia | February 26, 2001 | CD | Arista | |
| Denmark | August 27, 2001 | CD | Arista; BMG | |
