= Real Blondes =

Australian group

- Origin: Australia
- Years active: 1999–2001
- Labels: Epic Records
- Past members: Kristy Peters, Kelly Webb, Rachelle Medley

Real Blondes were a short lived Australian pop trio. They released two singles and had a campaign with Impulse fragrance.

== Career ==
Real Blondes formed in 1999 in an internet chat room before meeting in person. Kelly Webb's mother had written "We B Cool" and they recorded it at the Webb house. The trio were signed to Epic Records and released "We B Cool" in August 1999.

Their second single, "I Won't Let Go" was released in June 2000 and peaked at number 39 on the ARIA Charts.

== Discography ==
=== Singles ===
List of singles, with selected chart positions
Title	Year	Peak chart positions
Title	Year	AUS
"We B Cool"	1999	67
"I Won't Let Go"	2000	39
