= Eye Spy Magazine =

Eye Spy Magazine (International Intelligence Magazine in the United Kingdom) was a magazine published by Eye Spy Publishing Ltd. from North Yorkshire, England until 2020. In the United States, it was edited in New York City, in the Empire State Building.

== History and profile ==
Eye Spy was started by Mark Birdsall in 2000. The magazine dealt with international intelligence stories, many of which had to do with such subjects as Al Qaeda, the destruction of TWA flight 800, the ex-Soviet Union, spies and their careers, the history of espionage, global terrorism and a wide array of other controversial issues all of which have to do with 'intelligence'.

The magazine claimed to obtain its information from intelligence group sources worldwide. Eye Spy featured articles which discuss and analyze 'James Bond' style spy technology on a perfectly serious level. There were also often glowing endorsements of training courses or instructional material marketed by companies linked to some of the magazine's regular contributors. The magazine reported that it was required reading for actual intelligence industry professionals.

Eye Spy was an independent magazine and was sold in 36 countries.
