= I Spy (Erica Baxter song) =

Single by Erica Baxter

from the album Through My Eyes
- Released: 14 October 2006
- Recorded: 2006
- Genre: Pop
- Length: 3:32
- Label: Sony BMG
- Songwriters: Natasha Bedingfield; Kevin D Hughes
- Producers: Tom Nichols; Tim Baxter; Klaus Derendorf

Erica Baxter singles chronology
"Dreams" (2001)	"I Spy" (2006)	"I Don't Feel A Thing" (2007)

I Spy is a pop song which was released as the first single from Australian Erica Baxter’s debut album Through My Eyes. The single was released on 14 October 2006.

"I Spy" was written by British singer, Natasha Bedingfield and Kevin D Hughes. The single featured two previously unreleased songs, "Fly Away" and "Paper Tiger" which both were co-written by Baxter.

== Track listing ==
#	I Spy	Length
1.	"I Spy"	3:32
2.	"Fly Away"	3:35
3.	"Paper Tiger"	3:34

== Chart performance ==
"I Spy" debuted at #72 on the Singles Chart in Australia, #13 on the Australasian Top 20 and #47 on the Physical Singles Chart. In its second week, "I Spy" moved up to #57 on the Singles Chart, it moved up to #12 from #13 on the Australasian Charts and moved up to #37 on the Physical Singles Chart. On its third week the single dropped out of the Top 100 Singles, dropped off the Australasian Charts and dropped to #98 on the Physical Singles Chart. The next week it failed to appear on any charts.

== Charts ==
Chart	Peak position
Australia (ARIA)	57
