= Tony Lee Scott =

Australian singer

- Born: Australia
- Origin: Australia
- Genres: Pop
- Occupations: Singer; songwriter
- Instrument: Vocals
- Years active: 2000–2001
- Labels: Sony Music Australia

Tony Lee Scott is an Australian pop singer, who released two singles in the early 2000s.

== Early life ==
Tony Lee Scott was born and raised on a wheat farm in Queensland's Darling Downs to a Scottish father and a Maori mother. Tony's father played in a country music band.

== Discography ==
=== Singles ===
List of singles, with selected chart positions
Title	Year	Peak chart positions
Title	Year	AUS
"Take Me Away"	2000	50
"Tastes So Sweet"	2001	—
