= List of awards and nominations received by Taylor Swift =

Accolades by American singer-songwriter

Taylor Swift awards and nominations
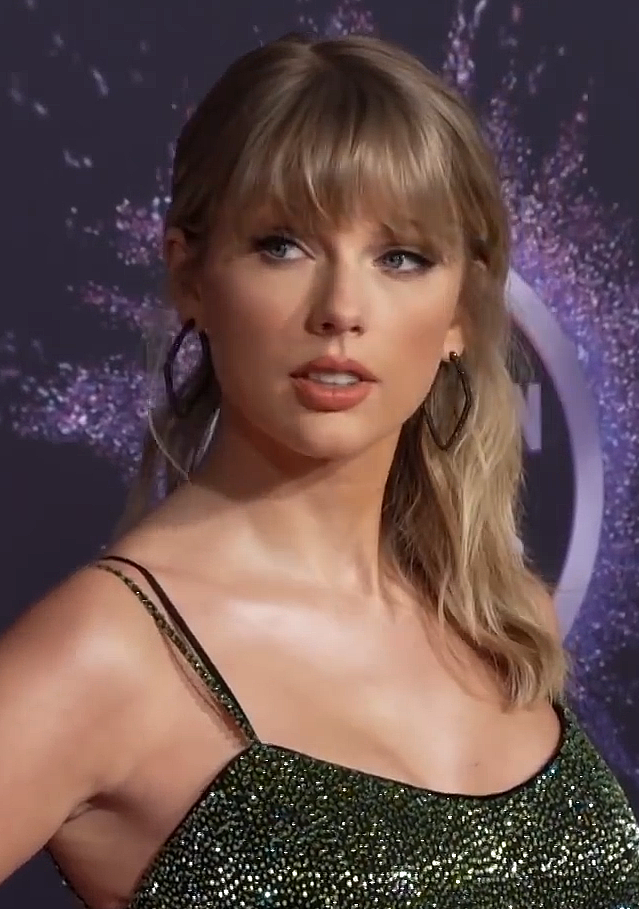
- Swift at the American Music Awards of 2019; she is the most-awarded artist by the organization.
Awards and nominations
Award	Wins	Nominations
Academy of Country Music Awards	8	31
American Country Awards	4	24
American Country Countdown Awards	0	1
American Music Awards	40	62
Anthem Awards	1	1
Apple Music Awards	2	2
APRA Awards (Australia)	1	4
ARIA Music Awards	5	13
The Arthur Awards	0	1
Asian Pop Music Awards	1	1
The Astra Awards	0	1
Attitude Awards	1	1
A2IM Libera Awards	1	6
BBC Music Awards	1	2
BBC Radio 1 Teen Awards	1	3
Billboard Music Awards	49	90
Billboard Touring Awards	4	17
Billboard Women in Music	3	3
Billboard Year-End Awards	1	1
BMI Country Awards	25	25
BMI London Awards	5	5
BMI Pop Awards	60	60
Bravo Otto	3	6
BreakTudo Awards	1	23
Brit Awards	2	15
BuzzAngle Music Awards	7	7
Camerimage International Film Festival	1	3
Canadian Country Music Association	5	5
CD Shop Awards	1	1
Channel V Thailand Music Video Awards	1	1
Clio Awards	2	2
Country Music Association Awards	12	29
Country Music Awards of Australia	1	1
CMC Music Awards	3	3
CMT Music Awards	8	25
Critics' Choice Documentary Awards	1	2
Critics' Choice Movie Awards	0	1
Dance Magazine Awards	1	1
Danish Music Awards	2	3
Do Something Awards	1	3
Echo Awards	0	2
Elle Style Awards	1	1
FiFi Awards	2	3
GAFFA Awards (Denmark)	0	2
GAFFA Awards (Sweden)	0	1
GLAAD Media Awards	1	1
Glamour Awards	1	1
Global Awards	1	8
Golden Boot Awards	1	2
Golden Globe Awards	0	5
Gracie Awards	1	1
Grammy Awards	14	63
Grand Remi Awards	1	1
Guild of Music Supervisors Awards	0	1
Guinness World Records	118	118
Hit FM Music Awards	4	4
Hito Music Awards	4	4
Hollywood Critics Association Film Awards	1	1
Hollywood Critics Association Midseason Awards	0	1
Hollywood Music in Media Awards	1	2
Huading Awards	0	1
IFPI Awards	15	15
iHeartRadio Music Awards	41	77
iHeartRadio Titanium Award	2	2
Japan Gold Disc Awards	11	11
Joox Indonesia Music Awards	1	1
Joox Malaysia Music Awards	1	1
Joox Thailand Music Awards	0	3
Juno Awards	0	10
KKBOX Music Awards	2	2
Latino Entertainment Journalists Association Film Awards	0	1
LOS40 Music Awards	2	11
Meteor Music Awards	0	1
MTV Europe Music Awards	19	51
MTV Italian Music Awards	0	4
MTV Millennial Awards	2	8
MTV Millennial Awards Brazil	1	4
MTV Movie & TV Awards	1	3
MTV Video Music Awards	33	82
MTV Video Music Awards Japan	2	8
MTVU Woodie Awards	1	1
Much Music Video Awards	1	12
Music Awards Japan	0	4
Music Business Association	1	1
MVPA Awards	0	2
Myx Music Awards	3	9
Nashville Songwriter Awards	14	14
Nashville Songwriters Hall of Fame	1	1
Nashville Symphony Ball	1	1
National Music Publishers' Association	1	1
Neox Fan Awards	0	1
NetEase Annual Music Awards	7	7
New Music Awards	4	9
Nickelodeon Kids' Choice Awards	8	55
Meus Prêmios Nick	0	1
Nickelodeon Australian Kids' Choice Awards	0	8
Nickelodeon Argentina Kids' Choice Awards	0	2
Nickelodeon Colombia Kids' Choice Awards	0	1
Nickelodeon Mexico Kids' Choice Awards	1	4
Nickelodeon UK Kids' Choice Awards	0	4
NME Awards	3	9
Northwest Tennessee Disaster Services	1	1
NRJ Music Awards	3	10
O Music Awards	1	2
OFM Music Awards	1	1
People's Choice Awards	20	39
PETA's Libby Awards	1	1
Pollstar Awards	4	8
Premios Juventud	0	2
Premios MUSA	1	2
Premios Odeón	2	3
Primetime Emmy Awards	1	2
Q Awards	1	2
QQ Music Dianfeng Awards	2	2
Queerty Awards	0	1
Radio Disney Music Awards	8	20
RFK Center	1	1
Rockbjörnen	0	2
RTHK International Pop Poll Awards	28	28
Satellite Awards	0	2
Set Decorators Society of America Awards	1	1
Shorty Awards	2	3
SiriusXM Indie Awards	3	10
Society of Composers & Lyricists	0	1
Songwriters Hall of Fame	2	2
Space Shower Music Awards	0	1
TEC Awards	0	1
Teen Choice Awards	26	66
Telehit Awards	3	6
Tencent Music Entertainment Awards	4	4
Ticketmaster Awards	2	2
UK Music Video Awards	0	5
V Chart Awards	8	8
Vevo Certified Awards	50	50
Webby Awards	1	2
Weibo Starlight Awards	3	3
World Music Awards	0	8
Young Hollywood Awards	1	1
YouTube Music Awards	2	4
Žebřík Music Awards	1	1

Totals (Note: Certain award groups do not simply award one winner. They acknowledge several different recipients, have runners-up, and have third place. Since this is a specific recognition and is different from losing an award, runner-up mentions are considered wins in this award tally. For simplification and to avoid errors, each award in this list has been presumed to have had a prior nomination.)
- Wins: 718
- Nominations: 1,720

The American singer-songwriter Taylor Swift has received numerous industry awards and honorary accolades. She is the most-awarded artist of the American Music Awards (40), the Billboard Music Awards (49), the MTV Video Music Awards (33), and the iHeartRadio Music Awards (41). She has the most Album of the Year wins at the Grammy Awards (4) and the most Video of the Year wins at the MTV Video Music Awards (6), and she has been recognized as the Global Recording Artist of the Year by the International Federation of the Phonographic Industry more times than any other artist (6).

Swift began her career in country music. She was nominated for Best New Artist at the 50th Annual Grammy Awards in 2008. Her second studio album, Fearless (2008), won Album of the Year at the Country Music Association Awards, the Academy of Country Music Awards, and the Grammy Awards; it also won the Grammy Award for Best Country Album. Her singles "White Horse" (2008) and "Mean" (2010) both won the Grammy Award for Best Country Song; the former also won Best Female Country Vocal Performance, and the latter Best Country Solo Performance. Her soundtrack single "Safe & Sound" for The Hunger Games (2011) won the Grammy Award for Best Song Written for Visual Media.

Swift transitioned from country to pop stardom with her fifth studio album, 1989 (2014), which won Album of the Year and Best Pop Vocal Album at the 58th Annual Grammy Awards in 2016, where the music video for its single "Bad Blood" won Best Music Video. At the 2016 BMI Pop Awards, Swift was honored with the Taylor Swift Award, becoming the second artist after Michael Jackson to have an award named after its recipient. In 2019, Swift was honored as the Woman of the Decade by Billboard and the Artist of the Decade at the American Music Awards. Her eighth studio album, Folklore (2020), won Album of the Year at the 63rd Annual Grammy Awards in 2021. She became the first woman to be honored with the Global Icon Award at the Brit Awards in 2021.

In 2023, Swift became the first entertainer to be honored as Time's Person of the Year. She achieved her fourth Grammy Award for Album of the Year with her tenth studio album, Midnights (2022), which also won Best Pop Vocal Album, at the 66th Annual Grammy Awards in 2024. The Grammy nomination for Song of the Year of "Anti-Hero" made her the first songwriter to have seven nominations in this category. Swift's eleventh album, The Tortured Poets Department (2024), made her the first woman to earn seven Album of the Year nominations at the Grammys. In January 2025, she was named the Top Artist of the 21st Century by Billboard.

In 2026, Swift was inducted into the Songwriters Hall of Fame and the Nashville Songwriters Hall of Fame. She also became the first artist to receive the MTV VMA Artist Director Honors, at the 2026 MTV Video Music Awards. Swift's twelfth album, The Life of a Showgirl (2025), made her the first artist to earn eight Album of the Year nominations at the Grammys strictly for solo albums. It also made her the first woman to be nominated in this category for five consecutive studio albums.

== Awards and nominations ==
Award	Year (Note: Indicates the year of ceremony. Each year is linked to the article about the awards held that year, wherever possible.)	Recipient(s)	Category	Result	Ref.
Academy of Country Music Awards	2007	Swift	New Female Vocalist of the Year	Nominated	
Academy of Country Music Awards	2008	Swift	New Female Vocalist of the Year	Won	
Academy of Country Music Awards	2008	Swift	Female Vocalist of the Year	Nominated	
Academy of Country Music Awards	2008	Taylor Swift	Album of the Year	Nominated	
Academy of Country Music Awards	2009	Swift	Female Vocalist of the Year	Nominated	
Academy of Country Music Awards	2009	"Love Story"	Video of the Year	Nominated	
Academy of Country Music Awards	2009	Fearless	Album of the Year	Won	
Academy of Country Music Awards	2009	Swift	Crystal Milestone Award	Won	
Academy of Country Music Awards	2010	Swift	Entertainer of the Year	Nominated	
Academy of Country Music Awards	2010	Swift	Female Vocalist of the Year	Nominated	
Academy of Country Music Awards	2010	"You Belong with Me"	Video of the Year	Nominated	
Academy of Country Music Awards	2010	"You Belong with Me"	Song of the Year	Nominated	
Academy of Country Music Awards	2011	Swift	Jim Reeves International Award	Won	
Academy of Country Music Awards	2011	Swift	Entertainer of the Year	Won	
Academy of Country Music Awards	2011	Swift	Female Vocalist of the Year	Nominated	
Academy of Country Music Awards	2011	Speak Now	Album of the Year	Nominated	
Academy of Country Music Awards	2012	Swift	Entertainer of the Year	Won	
Academy of Country Music Awards	2012	Swift	Female Vocalist of the Year	Nominated	
Academy of Country Music Awards	2012	"Mean"	Video of the Year	Nominated	
Academy of Country Music Awards	2013	Swift	Entertainer of the Year	Nominated	
Academy of Country Music Awards	2013	Swift	Female Vocalist of the Year	Nominated	
Academy of Country Music Awards	2013	"We Are Never Ever Getting Back Together"	Video of the Year	Nominated	
Academy of Country Music Awards	2013	Red	Album of the Year	Nominated	
Academy of Country Music Awards	2014	Swift	Entertainer of the Year	Nominated	
Academy of Country Music Awards	2014	Swift	Female Vocalist of the Year	Nominated	
Academy of Country Music Awards	2014	"Highway Don't Care" (with Tim McGraw and Keith Urban)	Video of the Year	Won	
Academy of Country Music Awards	2014	"Highway Don't Care" (with Tim McGraw and Keith Urban)	Single Record of the Year	Nominated	
Academy of Country Music Awards	2014	"Highway Don't Care" (with Tim McGraw and Keith Urban)	Vocal Event of the Year	Nominated	
Academy of Country Music Awards	2015	Swift	50th Anniversary Milestone Award	Won	
Academy of Country Music Awards	2019	"Babe" (with Sugarland)	Video of the Year	Nominated	
Academy of Country Music Awards	2022	"I Bet You Think About Me" (featuring Chris Stapleton)	Video of the Year	Nominated	
American Country Awards	2010	Swift	Artist of the Year	Nominated	
American Country Awards	2010	Swift	Female Artist of the Year	Nominated	
American Country Awards	2010	Swift	Touring Headline Package of the Year	Nominated	
American Country Awards	2011	Swift	Artist of the Year	Nominated	
American Country Awards	2011	Swift	Female Artist of the Year	Nominated	
American Country Awards	2011	Swift	Touring Headline Act of the Year	Nominated	
American Country Awards	2011	Speak Now	Album of the Year	Nominated	
American Country Awards	2011	"Mean"	Female Single of the Year	Nominated	
American Country Awards	2011	"Back to December"	Female Video of the Year	Nominated	
American Country Awards	2012	Swift	Artist of the Year	Nominated	
American Country Awards	2012	Swift	Female Artist of the Year	Nominated	
American Country Awards	2012	Swift	Touring Artist of the Year	Nominated	
American Country Awards	2012	"Ours"	Female Single of the Year	Nominated	
American Country Awards	2012	"Ours"	Female Video of the Year	Nominated	
American Country Awards	2013	Swift	Artist of the Year	Nominated	
American Country Awards	2013	Swift	Female Artist of the Year	Nominated	
American Country Awards	2013	Swift	Touring Artist of the Year	Nominated	
American Country Awards	2013	Swift	Worldwide Artist	Won	
American Country Awards	2013	"Begin Again"	Female Single of the Year	Nominated	
American Country Awards	2013	"Begin Again"	Video of the Year	Nominated	
American Country Awards	2013	"Begin Again"	Female Video of the Year	Nominated	
American Country Awards	2013	"Highway Don't Care" (with Tim McGraw and Keith Urban)	Collaborative Single of the Year	Won	
American Country Awards	2013	"Highway Don't Care" (with Tim McGraw and Keith Urban)	Collaborative Video of the Year	Won	
American Country Awards	2013	"Highway Don't Care" (with Tim McGraw and Keith Urban)	Song of the Year (Songwriters Award)	Won	
American Country Countdown Awards	2014	Swift	Female Vocalist of the Year	Nominated	
American Music Awards	2007	Swift	Favorite Country Female Artist	Nominated	
American Music Awards	2008	Swift	Favorite Country Female Artist	Won	
American Music Awards	2009	Swift	Artist of the Year	Won	
American Music Awards	2009	Swift	Favorite Pop/Rock Female Artist	Won	
American Music Awards	2009	Swift	Favorite Country Female Artist	Won	
American Music Awards	2009	Swift	Favorite Adult Contemporary Artist	Won	
American Music Awards	2009	Fearless	Favorite Country Album	Won	
American Music Awards	2009	Fearless	Favorite Pop/Rock Album	Nominated	
American Music Awards	2010	Swift	Favorite Country Female Artist	Won	
American Music Awards	2011	Swift	Artist of the Year	Won	
American Music Awards	2011	Swift	Favorite Country Female Artist	Won	
American Music Awards	2011	Speak Now	Favorite Country Album	Won	
American Music Awards	2012	Swift	Favorite Country Female Artist	Won	
American Music Awards	2013	Swift	Artist of the Year	Won	
American Music Awards	2013	Swift	Favorite Pop/Rock Female Artist	Won	
American Music Awards	2013	Swift	Favorite Country Female Artist	Won	
American Music Awards	2013	Red	Favorite Country Album	Won	
American Music Awards	2013	Red	Favorite Pop/Rock Album	Nominated	
American Music Awards	2014	Swift	Dick Clark Award for Excellence	Won	
American Music Awards	2015	Swift	Artist of the Year	Nominated	
American Music Awards	2015	Swift	Favorite Pop/Rock Female Artist	Nominated	
American Music Awards	2015	Swift	Favorite Adult Contemporary Artist	Won	
American Music Awards	2015	1989	Favorite Pop/Rock Album	Won	
American Music Awards	2015	"Blank Space"	Song of the Year	Won	
American Music Awards	2015	"Bad Blood" (featuring Kendrick Lamar)	Collaboration of the Year	Nominated	
American Music Awards	2018	Swift	Artist of the Year	Won	
American Music Awards	2018	Swift	Favorite Pop/Rock Female Artist	Won	
American Music Awards	2018	Reputation	Favorite Pop/Rock Album	Won	
American Music Awards	2018	Reputation Stadium Tour	Tour of the Year	Won	
American Music Awards	2019	Swift	Artist of the Decade	Won	
American Music Awards	2019	Swift	Artist of the Year	Won	
American Music Awards	2019	Swift	Favorite Pop/Rock Female Artist	Won	
American Music Awards	2019	Swift	Favorite Adult Contemporary Artist	Won	
American Music Awards	2019	"You Need to Calm Down"	Favorite Music Video	Won	
American Music Awards	2019	Lover	Favorite Pop/Rock Album	Won	
American Music Awards	2020	Swift	Artist of the Year	Won	
American Music Awards	2020	Swift	Favorite Pop/Rock Female Artist	Won	
American Music Awards	2020	"Cardigan"	Favorite Music Video	Won	
American Music Awards	2020	Folklore	Favorite Pop/Rock Album	Nominated	
American Music Awards	2021	Swift	Artist of the Year	Nominated	
American Music Awards	2021	Swift	Favorite Pop/Rock Female Artist	Won	
American Music Awards	2021	Evermore	Favorite Pop/Rock Album	Won	
American Music Awards	2022	Swift	Artist of the Year	Won	
American Music Awards	2022	Swift	Favorite Country Female Artist	Won	
American Music Awards	2022	Swift	Favorite Pop/Rock Female Artist	Won	
American Music Awards	2022	All Too Well: The Short Film	Favorite Music Video	Won	
American Music Awards	2022	Red (Taylor's Version)	Favorite Country Album	Won	
American Music Awards	2022	Red (Taylor's Version)	Favorite Pop Album	Won	
American Music Awards	2025	Swift	Artist of the Year	Nominated	
American Music Awards	2025	Swift	Favorite Touring Artist	Nominated	
American Music Awards	2025	Swift	Favorite Female Pop Artist	Nominated	
American Music Awards	2025	The Tortured Poets Department	Album of the Year	Nominated	
American Music Awards	2025	The Tortured Poets Department	Favorite Pop Album	Nominated	
American Music Awards	2025	"Fortnight" (featuring Post Malone)	Collaboration of the Year	Nominated	
American Music Awards	2026	Swift	Artist of the Year	Nominated	
American Music Awards	2026	Swift	Favorite Female Pop Artist	Nominated	
American Music Awards	2026	The Life of a Showgirl	Album of the Year	Nominated	
American Music Awards	2026	The Life of a Showgirl	Favorite Pop Album	Nominated	
American Music Awards	2026	"The Fate of Ophelia"	Song of the Year	Nominated	
American Music Awards	2026	"The Fate of Ophelia"	Best Music Video	Nominated	
American Music Awards	2026	"The Fate of Ophelia"	Best Pop Song	Nominated	
American Music Awards	2026	"Elizabeth Taylor"	Song of the Summer	Nominated	
Anthem Awards	2024	Vote.org + Taylor Swift on National Voter Registration Day	Human & Civil Rights – Awareness & Media Categories (Non Profit)	Won	
Apple Music Awards	2020	Swift	Songwriter of the Year	Won	
Apple Music Awards	2023	Swift	Artist of the Year	Won	
APRA Awards	2010	"Love Story"	International Work of the Year	Nominated	
APRA Awards	2016	"Blank Space"	International Work of the Year	Nominated	
APRA Awards	2016	"Style"	International Work of the Year	Nominated	
APRA Awards	2024	"Anti-Hero"	Most Performed International Work	Won	
ARIA Music Awards	2010	Swift	Most Popular International Artist	Nominated	
ARIA Music Awards	2013	Red	Best International Artist	Nominated	
ARIA Music Awards	2015	1989	Best International Artist	Nominated	
ARIA Music Awards	2016	1989	Best International Artist	Nominated	
ARIA Music Awards	2018	Reputation	Best International Artist	Nominated	
ARIA Music Awards	2019	Lover	Best International Artist	Won	
ARIA Music Awards	2020	Folklore	Best International Artist	Nominated	
ARIA Music Awards	2021	Evermore	Best International Artist	Won	
ARIA Music Awards	2022	Red (Taylor's Version)	Best International Artist	Nominated	
ARIA Music Awards	2023	Midnights	Best International Artist	Won	
ARIA Music Awards	2024	The Tortured Poets Department	Best International Artist	Won	
ARIA Music Awards	2025	Swift	Best International Artist	Won	
ARIA Music Awards	2026	The Life of a Showgirl	Most Popular International Artist	Nominated	
Art Directors Guild Awards	2020	Taylor Swift: Reputation Stadium Tour	Variety, Reality or Competition Series	Nominated	
The Arthur Awards	2021	Swift	Tour of the Decade	Nominated	
Asian Pop Music Awards	2022	Midnights	Best Global Artist	Won	
The Astra Awards	2024	Taylor Swift: The Eras Tour	Best Documentary Feature	Nominated	
Attitude Awards	2020	Swift	Attitude Icon Award	Won	
A2IM Libera Awards	2012	Swift	Road Warrior of the Year	Nominated	
A2IM Libera Awards	2013	Red	Album of the Year	Nominated	
A2IM Libera Awards	2013	Swift	Hardest Working Artist of the Year	Nominated	
A2IM Libera Awards	2014	Swift	Hardest Working Artist of the Year	Nominated	
A2IM Libera Awards	2015	1989	Album of the Year	Nominated	
A2IM Libera Awards	2018	Reputation	Independent Impact Award	Won	
BBC Music Awards	2014	Swift	International Artist of the Year	Nominated	
BBC Music Awards	2015	Swift	International Artist of the Year	Won	
BBC Radio 1 Teen Awards	2016	Swift	Most Entertaining Celebrity	Won	
BBC Radio 1 Teen Awards	2018	Swift	Best International Solo Artist	Nominated	
BBC Radio 1 Teen Awards	2019	Swift	Best International Solo Artist	Nominated	
Billboard Music Awards	2011	Swift	Top Artist	Nominated	
Billboard Music Awards	2011	Swift	Top Female Artist	Nominated	
Billboard Music Awards	2011	Swift	Top Billboard 200 Artist	Won	
Billboard Music Awards	2011	Swift	Top Country Artist	Won	
Billboard Music Awards	2011	Speak Now	Top Billboard 200 Album	Nominated	
Billboard Music Awards	2011	Speak Now	Top Country Album	Won	
Billboard Music Awards	2011	"Mine"	Top Country Song	Nominated	
Billboard Music Awards	2012	Swift	Top Touring Artist	Nominated	
Billboard Music Awards	2012	Swift	Top Country Artist	Nominated	
Billboard Music Awards	2012	Swift	Woman of the Year	Won	
Billboard Music Awards	2013	Swift	Top Artist	Won	
Billboard Music Awards	2013	Swift	Top Female Artist	Won	
Billboard Music Awards	2013	Swift	Top Billboard 200 Artist	Won	
Billboard Music Awards	2013	Swift	Top Hot 100 Artist	Nominated	
Billboard Music Awards	2013	Swift	Billboard Milestone Award	Nominated	
Billboard Music Awards	2013	Swift	Top Country Artist	Won	
Billboard Music Awards	2013	Swift	Top Social Artist	Nominated	
Billboard Music Awards	2013	Swift	Top Digital Songs Artist	Won	
Billboard Music Awards	2013	Red	Top Billboard 200 Album	Won	
Billboard Music Awards	2013	Red	Top Country Album	Won	
Billboard Music Awards	2013	"We Are Never Ever Getting Back Together"	Top Streaming Song (Video)	Nominated	
Billboard Music Awards	2013	"We Are Never Ever Getting Back Together"	Top Country Song	Won	
Billboard Music Awards	2014	Swift	Top Social Artist	Nominated	
Billboard Music Awards	2014	Swift	Top Country Artist	Nominated	
Billboard Music Awards	2015	Swift	Top Artist	Won	
Billboard Music Awards	2015	Swift	Top Female Artist	Won	
Billboard Music Awards	2015	Swift	Top Billboard 200 Artist	Won	
Billboard Music Awards	2015	Swift	Top Hot 100 Artist	Won	
Billboard Music Awards	2015	Swift	Top Radio Songs Artist	Nominated	
Billboard Music Awards	2015	Swift	Top Digital Songs Artist	Won	
Billboard Music Awards	2015	Swift	Top Streaming Artist	Nominated	
Billboard Music Awards	2015	Swift	Top Social Artist	Nominated	
Billboard Music Awards	2015	Swift	Billboard Chart Achievement Award	Won	
Billboard Music Awards	2015	1989	Top Billboard 200 Album	Won	
Billboard Music Awards	2015	"Shake It Off"	Top Hot 100 Song	Nominated	
Billboard Music Awards	2015	"Shake It Off"	Top Digital Song	Nominated	
Billboard Music Awards	2015	"Shake It Off"	Top Streaming Song (Video)	Won	
Billboard Music Awards	2015	"Blank Space"	Top Streaming Song (Video)	Nominated	
Billboard Music Awards	2016	Swift	Top Artist	Nominated	
Billboard Music Awards	2016	Swift	Top Female Artist	Nominated	
Billboard Music Awards	2016	Swift	Top Billboard 200 Artist	Nominated	
Billboard Music Awards	2016	Swift	Top Hot 100 Artist	Nominated	
Billboard Music Awards	2016	Swift	Top Radio Songs Artist	Nominated	
Billboard Music Awards	2016	Swift	Top Social Media Artist	Nominated	
Billboard Music Awards	2016	Swift	Top Touring Artist	Won	
Billboard Music Awards	2016	1989	Top Billboard 200 Album	Nominated	
Billboard Music Awards	2018	Swift	Top Artist	Nominated	
Billboard Music Awards	2018	Swift	Top Female Artist	Won	
Billboard Music Awards	2018	Swift	Top Billboard 200 Artist	Nominated	
Billboard Music Awards	2018	Reputation	Top Billboard 200 Album	Nominated	
Billboard Music Awards	2018	Reputation	Top Selling Album	Won	
Billboard Music Awards	2019	Swift	Top Female Artist	Nominated	
Billboard Music Awards	2019	Swift	Top Touring Artist	Nominated	
Billboard Music Awards	2020	Swift	Top Artist	Nominated	
Billboard Music Awards	2020	Swift	Top Female Artist	Nominated	
Billboard Music Awards	2020	Swift	Top Billboard 200 Artist	Nominated	
Billboard Music Awards	2020	Swift	Top Song Sales Artist	Nominated	
Billboard Music Awards	2020	Swift	Billboard Chart Achievement Award	Nominated	
Billboard Music Awards	2020	Lover	Top Billboard 200 Album	Nominated	
Billboard Music Awards	2021	Folklore	Top Billboard 200 Album	Nominated	
Billboard Music Awards	2021	Swift	Top Billboard 200 Artist	Won	
Billboard Music Awards	2021	Swift	Top Female Artist	Won	
Billboard Music Awards	2021	Swift	Top Artist	Nominated	
Billboard Music Awards	2022	Swift	Top Female Artist	Nominated	
Billboard Music Awards	2022	Swift	Top Artist	Nominated	
Billboard Music Awards	2022	Swift	Top Billboard 200 Artist	Won	
Billboard Music Awards	2022	Swift	Top Country Artist	Won	
Billboard Music Awards	2022	Swift	Top Country Female Artist	Won	
Billboard Music Awards	2022	Fearless (Taylor's Version)	Top Country Album	Nominated	
Billboard Music Awards	2022	Red (Taylor's Version)	Top Country Album	Won	
Billboard Music Awards	2023	Swift	Top Artist	Won	
Billboard Music Awards	2023	Swift	Top Female Artist	Won	
Billboard Music Awards	2023	Swift	Top Billboard 200 Artist	Won	
Billboard Music Awards	2023	Swift	Top Hot 100 Artist	Nominated	
Billboard Music Awards	2023	Swift	Top Country Artist	Nominated	
Billboard Music Awards	2023	Swift	Top Country Female Artist	Won	
Billboard Music Awards	2023	Swift	Top Radio Songs Artist	Won	
Billboard Music Awards	2023	Swift	Top Streaming Songs Artist	Nominated	
Billboard Music Awards	2023	Swift	Top Songs Sales Artist	Won	
Billboard Music Awards	2023	Swift	Top Hot 100 Producer	Nominated	
Billboard Music Awards	2023	Swift	Top Hot 100 Songwriter	Won	
Billboard Music Awards	2023	Swift	Top Global 200 Artist	Won	
Billboard Music Awards	2023	Swift	Top Global 200 (Excl. US) Artist	Won	
Billboard Music Awards	2023	"Anti-Hero"	Top Hot 100 Song	Nominated	
Billboard Music Awards	2023	"Anti-Hero"	Top Radio Song	Nominated	
Billboard Music Awards	2023	"Anti-Hero"	Top Streaming Song	Nominated	
Billboard Music Awards	2023	"Anti-Hero"	Top Selling Song	Won	
Billboard Music Awards	2023	"Anti-Hero"	Top Billboard Global 200 Song	Nominated	
Billboard Music Awards	2023	Midnights	Top Billboard 200 Album	Nominated	
Billboard Music Awards	2023	Speak Now (Taylor's Version)	Top Country Album	Nominated	
Billboard Music Awards	2024	Swift	Top Artist	Won	
Billboard Music Awards	2024	Swift	Top Female Artist	Won	
Billboard Music Awards	2024	Swift	Top Billboard 200 Artist	Won	
Billboard Music Awards	2024	Swift	Top Hot 100 Artist	Won	
Billboard Music Awards	2024	Swift	Top Radio Songs Artist	Won	
Billboard Music Awards	2024	Swift	Top Streaming Songs Artist	Won	
Billboard Music Awards	2024	Swift	Top Songs Sales Artist	Nominated	
Billboard Music Awards	2024	Swift	Top Hot 100 Producer	Nominated	
Billboard Music Awards	2024	Swift	Top Hot 100 Songwriter	Won	
Billboard Music Awards	2024	Swift	Top Global 200 Artist	Won	
Billboard Music Awards	2024	Swift	Top Global 200 (Excl. US) Artist	Won	
Billboard Music Awards	2024	"Fortnight" (featuring Post Malone)	Top Collaboration	Nominated	
Billboard Music Awards	2024	"Cruel Summer"	Top Radio Song	Nominated	
Billboard Music Awards	2024	"Cruel Summer"	Top Global 200 Song	Nominated	
Billboard Music Awards	2024	"Cruel Summer"	Top Global 200 (Excl. US) Song	Nominated	
Billboard Music Awards	2024	The Tortured Poets Department	Top Billboard 200 Album	Won	
Billboard Music Awards	2024	1989 (Taylor's Version)	Top Billboard 200 Album	Nominated	
Billboard Live Music (Touring) Awards	2010	Fearless Tour	Top Package	Won	
Billboard Live Music (Touring) Awards	2010	Swift	Eventful Fans' Choice Award	Nominated	
Billboard Live Music (Touring) Awards	2011	Speak Now World Tour	Concert Marketing and Promotion Award	Won	
Billboard Live Music (Touring) Awards	2011	Speak Now World Tour	Top Package	Nominated	
Billboard Live Music (Touring) Awards	2011	Speak Now World Tour	Eventful Fans' Choice Award	Nominated	
Billboard Live Music (Touring) Awards	2012	Swift	Top Package	Nominated	
Billboard Live Music (Touring) Awards	2012	Swift	Eventful Fans' Choice Award	Nominated	
Billboard Live Music (Touring) Awards	2013	The Red Tour	Top Package	Won	
Billboard Live Music (Touring) Awards	2013	The Red Tour	Concert Marketing and Promotion Award	Nominated	
Billboard Live Music (Touring) Awards	2013	Swift	Eventful Fans' Choice Award	Nominated	
Billboard Live Music (Touring) Awards	2015	The 1989 World Tour	Top Tour	Nominated	
Billboard Live Music (Touring) Awards	2015	Swift	Top Draw	Nominated	
Billboard Live Music (Touring) Awards	2018	Reputation Stadium Tour	Top Tour	Nominated	
Billboard Live Music (Touring) Awards	2018	Reputation Stadium Tour	Top U.S. Tour	Won	
Billboard Live Music (Touring) Awards	2018	Taylor Swift's Reputation Stadium Tour: MetLife Stadium (July 20–22, 2018)	Top Boxscore	Nominated	
Billboard Live Music (Touring) Awards	2018	Swift	Top Draw	Nominated	
Billboard Live Music (Touring) Awards	2019	Swift x FujiFilm Activation for the Reputation Stadium Tour	Concert and Marketing Promotions Award	Nominated	
Billboard Women in Music	2011	Swift	Woman of the Year	Won	
Billboard Women in Music	2014	Swift	Woman of the Year	Won	
Billboard Women in Music	2019	Swift	Woman of the Decade	Won	
Billboard Year-End Awards	2009	Swift	Artist of the Year (Female)	Won	
BMI Country Awards	2007	"Tim McGraw"	Award-Winning Songs	Won	
BMI Country Awards	2008	"Our Song"	Award-Winning Songs	Won	
BMI Country Awards	2008	"Teardrops On My Guitar"	Award-Winning Songs	Won	
BMI Country Awards	2008	"Teardrops On My Guitar"	Song of the Year	Won	
BMI Country Awards	2009	"Love Story"	Song of the Year	Won	
BMI Country Awards	2009	"Love Story"	Award-Winning Songs	Won	
BMI Country Awards	2009	"Picture to Burn"	Award-Winning Songs	Won	
BMI Country Awards	2009	"Should've Said No"	Award-Winning Songs	Won	
BMI Country Awards	2010	Swift	Songwriter of the Year	Won	
BMI Country Awards	2010	"You Belong with Me"	Song of the Year	Won	
BMI Country Awards	2010	"Fifteen"	Award-Winning Songs	Won	
BMI Country Awards	2010	"Best Days of Your Life" (with Kellie Pickler)	Award-Winning Songs	Won	
BMI Country Awards	2010	"White Horse"	Award-Winning Songs	Won	
BMI Country Awards	2010	"You Belong with Me"	Award-Winning Songs	Won	
BMI Country Awards	2011	"Back To December"	Award-Winning Songs	Won	
BMI Country Awards	2011	"Fearless"	Award-Winning Songs	Won	
BMI Country Awards	2011	"Mine"	Award-Winning Songs	Won	
BMI Country Awards	2012	"Mean"	Top 50 Songs	Won	
BMI Country Awards	2012	"Sparks Fly"	Top 50 Songs	Won	
BMI Country Awards	2013	"Begin Again"	Top 50 Songs	Won	
BMI Country Awards	2013	"Ours"	Top 50 Songs	Won	
BMI Country Awards	2014	"Highway Don't Care" (with Tim McGraw)	Top 50 Songs	Won	
BMI Country Awards	2014	"Red"	Top 50 Songs	Won	
BMI Country Awards	2017	"Better Man"	Top 50 Songs	Won	
BMI Country Awards	2019	"Babe"	Top 50 Songs	Won	
BMI London Awards	2014	"Everything Has Changed" (featuring Ed Sheeran)	Award-Winning Song	Won	
BMI London Awards	2018	"Look What You Made Me Do"	Pop Award	Won	
BMI London Awards	2019	"End Game" (featuring Ed Sheeran and Future)	Pop Award	Won	
BMI London Awards	2021	"Betty"	Award-Winning Song	Won	
BMI London Awards	2022	"Exile"	Award-Winning Song	Won	
BMI Pop Awards	2009	Swift	BMI President's Award	Won	
BMI Pop Awards	2009	"Teardrops On My Guitar"	Award-Winning Songs	Won	
BMI Pop Awards	2010	"Love Story"	Song of the Year	Won	
BMI Pop Awards	2010	"Love Story"	Award-Winning Songs	Won	
BMI Pop Awards	2010	"You Belong with Me"	Award-Winning Songs	Won	
BMI Pop Awards	2011	"Two Is Better Than One" (with Boys Like Girls)	Award-Winning Songs	Won	
BMI Pop Awards	2011	"You Belong with Me"	Award-Winning Songs	Won	
BMI Pop Awards	2012	"Mine"	Award-Winning Songs	Won	
BMI Pop Awards	2013	"We Are Never Ever Getting Back Together"	Award-Winning Songs	Won	
BMI Pop Awards	2014	"I Knew You Were Trouble"	Award-Winning Songs	Won	
BMI Pop Awards	2015	Swift	Songwriter of the Year	Won	
BMI Pop Awards	2015	"22"	Award-Winning Songs	Won	
BMI Pop Awards	2015	"Everything Has Changed" (featuring Ed Sheeran)	Award-Winning Songs	Won	
BMI Pop Awards	2015	"Shake It Off"	Award-Winning Songs	Won	
BMI Pop Awards	2016	Swift	Taylor Swift Award	Won	
BMI Pop Awards	2016	Swift	Songwriter of the Year	Won	
BMI Pop Awards	2016	"Bad Blood" (featuring Kendrick Lamar)	Award-Winning Songs	Won	
BMI Pop Awards	2016	"Blank Space"	Award-Winning Songs	Won	
BMI Pop Awards	2016	"Style"	Award-Winning Songs	Won	
BMI Pop Awards	2016	"Wildest Dreams"	Award-Winning Songs	Won	
BMI Pop Awards	2017	"This Is What You Came For"	Award-Winning Songs	Won	
BMI Pop Awards	2018	"I Don't Wanna Live Forever" (with Zayn)	Award-Winning Songs	Won	
BMI Pop Awards	2019	"Look What You Made Me Do"	Award-Winning Songs	Won	
BMI Pop Awards	2019	"...Ready for It?"	Award-Winning Songs	Won	
BMI Pop Awards	2019	"End Game" (featuring Ed Sheeran and Future)	Award-Winning Songs	Won	
BMI Pop Awards	2019	"Delicate"	Award-Winning Songs	Won	
BMI Pop Awards	2019	Swift	Songwriter of the Year	Won	
BMI Pop Awards	2020	"Me!" (featuring Brendon Urie)	Award-Winning Songs	Won	
BMI Pop Awards	2020	"You Need to Calm Down"	Award-Winning Songs	Won	
BMI Pop Awards	2021	"Lover"	Award-Winning Songs	Won	
BMI Pop Awards	2021	"The Man"	Award-Winning Songs	Won	
BMI Pop Awards	2022	"Cardigan"	Most Performed Songs of the Year	Won	
BMI Pop Awards	2022	"Willow"	Most Performed Songs of the Year	Won	
BMI Pop Awards	2022	"Deja Vu"	Most Performed Songs of the Year	Won	
BMI Pop Awards	2024	"Anti-Hero"	Most Performed Songs of the Year	Won	
BMI Pop Awards	2024	"Bejeweled"	Most Performed Songs of the Year	Won	
BMI Pop Awards	2024	"Cruel Summer"	Most Performed Songs of the Year	Won	
BMI Pop Awards	2024	"Karma"	Most Performed Songs of the Year	Won	
BMI Pop Awards	2024	"Lavender Haze"	Most Performed Songs of the Year	Won	
BMI Pop Awards	2024	"Maroon"	Most Performed Songs of the Year	Won	
BMI Pop Awards	2024	"Midnight Rain"	Most Performed Songs of the Year	Won	
BMI Pop Awards	2024	"Snow on the Beach" (featuring Lana Del Rey)	Most Performed Songs of the Year	Won	
BMI Pop Awards	2024	"Vigilante Shit"	Most Performed Songs of the Year	Won	
BMI Pop Awards	2024	"You're on Your Own, Kid"	Most Performed Songs of the Year	Won	
BMI Pop Awards	2024	Swift	Songwriter of the Year	Won	
BMI Pop Awards	2025	Swift	Songwriter of the Year	Won	
BMI Pop Awards	2025	"Don't Blame Me"	Most Performed Songs of the Year	Won	
BMI Pop Awards	2025	"Down Bad"	Most Performed Songs of the Year	Won	
BMI Pop Awards	2025	"Fortnight" (featuring Post Malone)	Most Performed Songs of the Year	Won	
BMI Pop Awards	2025	"I Can Do It with a Broken Heart"	Most Performed Songs of the Year	Won	
BMI Pop Awards	2025	"Is It Over Now?"	Most Performed Songs of the Year	Won	
BMI Pop Awards	2025	"Now That We Don't Talk"	Most Performed Songs of the Year	Won	
BMI Pop Awards	2025	"Who's Afraid of Little Old Me?"	Most Performed Songs of the Year	Won	
BMI Pop Awards	2026	Swift	Songwriter of the Year	Won	
BMI Pop Awards	2026	"But Daddy I Love Him"	Most Performed Songs of the Year	Won	
BMI Pop Awards	2026	"Florida!!!" (featuring Florence and the Machine)	Most Performed Songs of the Year	Won	
BMI Pop Awards	2026	"Guilty as Sin?"	Most Performed Songs of the Year	Won	
BMI Pop Awards	2026	"My Boy Only Breaks His Favorite Toys"	Most Performed Songs of the Year	Won	
BMI Pop Awards	2026	"So Long, London"	Most Performed Songs of the Year	Won	
BMI Pop Awards	2026	"The Smallest Man Who Ever Lived"	Most Performed Songs of the Year	Won	
Bravo Otto	2012	Swift	Super Singer Female	Bronze	
Bravo Otto	2013	Swift and Selena Gomez	Super-BFFs	Gold	
Bravo Otto	2019	Swift	International Singer	Nominated	
Bravo Otto	2020	Swift	International Singer	Nominated	
Bravo Otto	2022	Swift	International Singer	Bronze	
Bravo Otto	2023	Swift	International Singer	Nominated	
BreakTudo Awards	2017	"Look What You Made Me Do"	Best Music Video	Nominated	
BreakTudo Awards	2017	Swift	Best International Female Artist	Nominated	
BreakTudo Awards	2018	Swift	Female Artist International	Nominated	
BreakTudo Awards	2018	"Delicate"	Video of the Year	Nominated	
BreakTudo Awards	2018	Reputation	Album of the Year	Nominated	
BreakTudo Awards	2018	Reputation Stadium Tour	Summer Tour	Nominated	
BreakTudo Awards	2019	"You Need to Calm Down"	International Video of the Year	Nominated	
BreakTudo Awards	2019	"Me!" (featuring Brendon Urie)	Boom Clip of the Year	Nominated	
BreakTudo Awards	2019	Swift	International Female Artist	Nominated	
BreakTudo Awards	2020	Swift	International Female Artist	Nominated	
BreakTudo Awards	2020	Folklore	Album of the Year	Nominated	
BreakTudo Awards	2021	Swifties	International Fandom	Nominated	
BreakTudo Awards	2021	Swift	International Female Artist	Nominated	
BreakTudo Awards	2022	Swift	International Female Artist	Nominated	
BreakTudo Awards	2022	All Too Well: The Short Film	International Music Video	Nominated	
BreakTudo Awards	2023	"Anti-Hero"	International Hit	Nominated	
BreakTudo Awards	2023	Swift	International Female Artist	Won	
BreakTudo Awards	2024	Swift	International Female Artist	Nominated	
BreakTudo Awards	2024	"Fortnight" (featuring Post Malone)	International Hit of the Year	Nominated	
BreakTudo Awards	2024	Swifties	International Fandom of the Year	Nominated	
BreakTudo Awards	2026	Swifties	International Fandom of the Year	Pending	
BreakTudo Awards	2026	Swift	International Female Artist	Pending	
BreakTudo Awards	2026	"The Fate of Ophelia"	International Hit of the Year	Pending	
Brit Awards	2010	Swift	International Breakthrough Artist	Nominated	
Brit Awards	2013	Swift	International Female Solo Artist	Nominated	
Brit Awards	2015	Swift	International Female Solo Artist	Won	
Brit Awards	2018	Swift	International Female Solo Artist	Nominated	
Brit Awards	2018	"I Don't Wanna Live Forever" (with Zayn)	British Video of the Year	Nominated	
Brit Awards	2021	Swift	International Female Solo Artist	Nominated	
Brit Awards	2021	Swift	Global Icon Award	Won	
Brit Awards	2022	Swift	International Artist of the Year	Nominated	
Brit Awards	2023	Swift	International Artist of the Year	Nominated	
Brit Awards	2023	"Anti-Hero"	International Song of the Year	Nominated	
Brit Awards	2024	Swift	International Artist of the Year	Nominated	
Brit Awards	2025	Swift	International Artist of the Year	Nominated	
Brit Awards	2025	"Fortnight" (featuring Post Malone)	International Song of the Year	Nominated	
Brit Awards	2026	"The Fate of Ophelia"	International Song of the Year	Nominated	
Brit Awards	2026	Swift	International Artist of the Year	Nominated	
British LGBT Awards	2020	Swift	Celebrity Ally	Nominated	
BuzzAngle Music Awards	2017	Reputation	Physical Album Sales	Won	
BuzzAngle Music Awards	2017	Reputation	Digital Album Sales	Won	
BuzzAngle Music Awards	2017	Reputation	Indie Album	Won	
BuzzAngle Music Awards	2017	Swift	Artist Physical Album Sales	Won	
BuzzAngle Music Awards	2017	Swift	Indie Artist	Won	
BuzzAngle Music Awards	2019	Lover	Top Albums by Album Sales	Won	
BuzzAngle Music Awards	2019	Lover	Digital Album Sales	Won	
Camerimage International Film Festival	2020	"Lover"	Best Music Video	Nominated	
Canadian Country Music Association	2009	Fearless	Top Selling Album	Won	
Canadian Country Music Association	2010	Fearless	Top Selling Album	Won	
Canadian Country Music Association	2011	Speak Now	Top Selling Album	Won	
Canadian Country Music Association	2012	Swift	Generation Award	Won	
Canadian Country Music Association	2013	Red	Top Selling Album	Won	
CD Shop Awards	2020	Lover	Music Jacket Creative Awards	Won	
Channel V Thailand Music Video Awards	2009	Swift	Popular New Artist	Won	
Clio Awards	2016	"Taylor vs. Treadmill" for Apple	Bronze Award for Best Commercials	Won	
Clio Awards	2016	"Taylor vs. Treadmill" for Apple	Silver Award for Best Commercials (between 30 and 60 seconds long)	Won	
Country Music Association Awards	2007	Swift	Horizon Award	Won	
Country Music Association Awards	2008	Swift	Female Vocalist of the Year	Nominated	
Country Music Association Awards	2009	Swift	Entertainer of the Year	Won	
Country Music Association Awards	2009	Swift	Female Vocalist of the Year	Won	
Country Music Association Awards	2009	Swift	International Artist Achievement Award	Won	
Country Music Association Awards	2009	Fearless	Album of the Year	Won	
Country Music Association Awards	2009	"Love Story"	Music Video of the Year	Won	
Country Music Association Awards	2010	Swift	Female Vocalist of the Year	Nominated	
Country Music Association Awards	2011	Swift	Entertainer of the Year	Won	
Country Music Association Awards	2011	Swift	Female Vocalist of the Year	Nominated	
Country Music Association Awards	2011	Speak Now	Album of the Year	Nominated	
Country Music Association Awards	2011	"Mean"	Song of the Year	Nominated	
Country Music Association Awards	2011	"Mean"	Music Video of the Year	Nominated	
Country Music Association Awards	2012	Swift	Entertainer of the Year	Nominated	
Country Music Association Awards	2012	Swift	Female Vocalist of the Year	Nominated	
Country Music Association Awards	2012	"Safe & Sound" (featuring the Civil Wars)	Musical Event of the Year	Nominated	
Country Music Association Awards	2013	Swift	Pinnacle Award	Won	
Country Music Association Awards	2013	Swift	International Artist Achievement Award	Won	
Country Music Association Awards	2013	Swift	Entertainer of the Year	Nominated	
Country Music Association Awards	2013	Swift	Female Vocalist of the Year	Nominated	
Country Music Association Awards	2013	Red	Album of the Year	Nominated	
Country Music Association Awards	2013	"Highway Don't Care" (with Tim McGraw and Keith Urban)	Single of the Year	Nominated	
Country Music Association Awards	2013	"Highway Don't Care" (with Tim McGraw and Keith Urban)	Musical Event of the Year	Won	
Country Music Association Awards	2013	"Highway Don't Care" (with Tim McGraw and Keith Urban)	Music Video of the Year	Won	
Country Music Association Awards	2014	Swift	Female Vocalist of the Year	Nominated	
Country Music Association Awards	2017	"Better Man"	Song of the Year	Won	
Country Music Association Awards	2018	"Babe" (with Sugarland)	Video of the Year	Nominated	
Country Music Association Awards	2022	"I Bet You Think About Me"	Video of the Year	Nominated	
Country Music Association Awards	2026	"I Knew It, I Knew You"	Single of the Year	Nominated	
Country Music Awards of Australia	2014	Red	Top Selling International Album of the Year	Won	
CMC Music Awards	2011	Swift	International Artist of the Year	Won	
CMC Music Awards	2014	Swift	International Artist of the Year	Won	
CMC Music Awards	2014	"Highway Don't Care" (with Tim McGraw)	International Video of the Year	Won	
CMT Artists of the Year	2010	Swift	Artists of the Year	Won	
CMT Artists of the Year	2011	Swift	Artists of the Year	Won	
CMT Music Awards	2007	"Tim McGraw"	Breakthrough Video of the Year	Won	
CMT Music Awards	2008	"Our Song"	Female Video of the Year	Won	
CMT Music Awards	2008	"Our Song"	Video of the Year	Won	
CMT Music Awards	2009	"Love Story"	Video of the Year	Won	
CMT Music Awards	2009	"Love Story"	Female Video of the Year	Won	
CMT Music Awards	2009	"Photograph" (with Def Leppard)	Wide Open Country Video of the Year	Nominated	
CMT Music Awards	2009	"Photograph" (with Def Leppard)	CMT Performance of the Year	Nominated	
CMT Music Awards	2010	"You Belong with Me"	Video of the Year	Nominated	
CMT Music Awards	2010	"You Belong with Me"	Female Video of the Year	Nominated	
CMT Music Awards	2010	"Best Days of Your Life" (with Kellie Pickler)	Collaborative Video of the Year	Nominated	
CMT Music Awards	2011	"Mine"	Video of the Year	Won	
CMT Music Awards	2011	"Mine"	Female Video of the Year	Nominated	
CMT Music Awards	2011	"Mine"	Best Web Video of the Year	Nominated	
CMT Music Awards	2012	"Safe & Sound" (featuring the Civil Wars)	Video of the Year	Nominated	
CMT Music Awards	2012	"Safe & Sound" (featuring the Civil Wars)	Collaborative Video of the Year	Nominated	
CMT Music Awards	2012	"Ours"	Female Video of the Year	Nominated	
CMT Music Awards	2013	"Begin Again"	Female Video of the Year	Nominated	
CMT Music Awards	2013	"We Are Never Ever Getting Back Together"	Video of the Year	Nominated	
CMT Music Awards	2014	"Highway Don't Care" (with Tim McGraw and Keith Urban)	Collaborative Video of the Year	Nominated	
CMT Music Awards	2014	"Highway Don't Care" (with Tim McGraw and Keith Urban)	Video of the Year	Nominated	
CMT Music Awards	2014	"Red"	Video of the Year	Nominated	
CMT Music Awards	2014	"Red"	Female Video of the Year	Nominated	
CMT Music Awards	2021	"The Best Day (Taylor's Version)"	Best Family Feature	Won	
CMT Music Awards	2022	"I Bet You Think About Me" (featuring Chris Stapleton)	Video of the Year	Nominated	
CMT Music Awards	2022	"Love Story (Taylor's Version)"	Trending Comeback Song of the Year	Won	
Critics' Choice Documentary Awards	2020	Miss Americana	Most Compelling Living Subjects of a Documentary	Won	
Critics' Choice Documentary Awards	2023	Taylor Swift: The Eras Tour	Best Music Documentary	Nominated	
Critics' Choice Movie Awards	2023	"Carolina"	Best Song	Nominated	
Dance Magazine Awards	2020	"Me!" (featuring Brendon Urie)	Best Music Video	Won	
Danish Music Awards	2015	1989	International Album of the Year	Nominated	
Danish Music Awards	2020	Folklore	International Album of the Year	Won	
Danish Music Awards	2023	Midnights	International Album of the Year	Won	
Do Something Awards	2011	Taylor Swift's Speak Now Tour to Benefit Tornado Victims	Do Something Concert	Won	
Do Something Awards	2012	Swift	Do Something Music Artist	Nominated	
Do Something Awards	2012	Swift Takes High School Senior With Leukemia To ACM Awards	Do Something Facebook	Nominated	
Echo Awards	2015	1989	International Album of the Year	Nominated	
Echo Awards	2018	Swift	International Rock/Pop Female Artist	Nominated	
Elle Style Awards	2015	Swift	Woman of the Year	Won	
FiFi Awards	2012	Wonderstruck	Fragrance of the Year: Women's Luxe	Nominated	
FiFi Awards	2013	Wonderstruck Enchanted	Fragrance Celebrity of the Year	Won	
FiFi Awards	2015	Incredible Things	Fragrance of the Year: Women's Popular	Won	
Gaffa Awards (Denmark)	2021	Swift	International Solo Artist of the Year	Nominated	
Gaffa Awards (Denmark)	2021	Folklore	International Album of the Year	Nominated	
Gaffa Awards (Denmark)	2023	Swift	International Solo Artist of the Year	Nominated	
Gaffa Awards (Denmark)	2023	Midnights	International Release of the Year	Nominated	
Gaffa Awards (Denmark)	2023	"Anti-Hero"	International Hit of the Year	Nominated	
Gaffa Awards (Sweden)	2021	Swift	International Solo Artist of the Year	Nominated	
GLAAD Media Awards	2020	Swift	Vanguard Award	Won	
Glamour Awards	2014	Swift	International Solo Artist	Won	
Global Awards	2018	Swift	Best Female Artist	Nominated	
Global Awards	2020	Swift	Best Mass Appeal Artist	Nominated	
Global Awards	2023	"Anti-Hero"	Best Song	Nominated	
Global Awards	2023	Swift	Best Female	Nominated	
Global Awards	2024	"Karma"	Best Song	Nominated	
Global Awards	2024	Swift	Best Female	Won	
Global Awards	2024	Swift	Best Pop	Nominated	
Global Awards	2024	Swift	Best Fans	Nominated	
Golden Boot Awards	2019	"Babe" (with Sugarland)	Music Video of the Year	Nominated	
Golden Boot Awards	2019	"Babe" (with Sugarland)	Collaboration of the Year	Won	
Golden Globe Awards	2013	"Safe & Sound" (featuring the Civil Wars)	Best Original Song – Motion Picture	Nominated	
Golden Globe Awards	2014	"Sweeter than Fiction"	Best Original Song – Motion Picture	Nominated	
Golden Globe Awards	2020	"Beautiful Ghosts"	Best Original Song – Motion Picture	Nominated	
Golden Globe Awards	2023	"Carolina"	Best Original Song – Motion Picture	Nominated	
Golden Globe Awards	2024	Taylor Swift: The Eras Tour	Cinematic and Box Office Achievement	Nominated	
Gracie Awards	2021	Folklore: The Long Pond Studio Sessions	Grand Award for Special or Variety	Won	
Grammy Awards	2008	Swift	Best New Artist	Nominated	
Grammy Awards	2010	"You Belong with Me"	Record of the Year	Nominated	
Grammy Awards	2010	"You Belong with Me"	Song of the Year	Nominated	
Grammy Awards	2010	"You Belong with Me"	Best Female Pop Vocal Performance	Nominated	
Grammy Awards	2010	Fearless	Album of the Year	Won	
Grammy Awards	2010	Fearless	Best Country Album	Won	
Grammy Awards	2010	"Breathe" (featuring Colbie Caillat)	Best Pop Collaboration with Vocals	Nominated	
Grammy Awards	2010	"White Horse"	Best Female Country Vocal Performance	Won	
Grammy Awards	2010	"White Horse"	Best Country Song	Won	
Grammy Awards	2012	"Mean"	Best Country Solo Performance	Won	
Grammy Awards	2012	"Mean"	Best Country Song	Won	
Grammy Awards	2012	Speak Now	Best Country Album	Nominated	
Grammy Awards	2013	"We Are Never Ever Getting Back Together"	Record of the Year	Nominated	
Grammy Awards	2013	"Safe & Sound" (featuring the Civil Wars)	Best Country Duo/Group Performance	Nominated	
Grammy Awards	2013	"Safe & Sound" (featuring the Civil Wars)	Best Song Written for Visual Media	Won	
Grammy Awards	2014	Red	Album of the Year	Nominated	
Grammy Awards	2014	Red	Best Country Album	Nominated	
Grammy Awards	2014	"Highway Don't Care" (with Tim McGraw and Keith Urban)	Best Country Duo/Group Performance	Nominated	
Grammy Awards	2014	"Begin Again"	Best Country Song	Nominated	
Grammy Awards	2015	"Shake It Off"	Record of the Year	Nominated	
Grammy Awards	2015	"Shake It Off"	Song of the Year	Nominated	
Grammy Awards	2015	"Shake It Off"	Best Pop Solo Performance	Nominated	
Grammy Awards	2016	"Blank Space"	Record of the Year	Nominated	
Grammy Awards	2016	"Blank Space"	Song of the Year	Nominated	
Grammy Awards	2016	"Blank Space"	Best Pop Solo Performance	Nominated	
Grammy Awards	2016	1989	Album of the Year	Won	
Grammy Awards	2016	1989	Best Pop Vocal Album	Won	
Grammy Awards	2016	"Bad Blood" (featuring Kendrick Lamar)	Best Pop Duo/Group Performance	Nominated	
Grammy Awards	2016	"Bad Blood" (featuring Kendrick Lamar)	Best Music Video	Won	
Grammy Awards	2018	"Better Man"	Best Country Song	Nominated	
Grammy Awards	2018	"I Don't Wanna Live Forever"	Best Song Written for Visual Media	Nominated	
Grammy Awards	2019	Reputation	Best Pop Vocal Album	Nominated	
Grammy Awards	2020	"Lover"	Song of the Year	Nominated	
Grammy Awards	2020	"You Need to Calm Down"	Best Pop Solo Performance	Nominated	
Grammy Awards	2020	Lover	Best Pop Vocal Album	Nominated	
Grammy Awards	2021	Folklore	Album of the Year	Won	
Grammy Awards	2021	Folklore	Best Pop Vocal Album	Nominated	
Grammy Awards	2021	"Cardigan"	Song of the Year	Nominated	
Grammy Awards	2021	"Cardigan"	Best Pop Solo Performance	Nominated	
Grammy Awards	2021	"Exile" (featuring Bon Iver)	Best Pop Duo/Group Performance	Nominated	
Grammy Awards	2021	"Beautiful Ghosts"	Best Song Written for Visual Media	Nominated	
Grammy Awards	2022	Evermore	Album of the Year	Nominated	
Grammy Awards	2023	"All Too Well (10 Minute Version) (The Short Film)"	Song of the Year	Nominated	
Grammy Awards	2023	"I Bet You Think About Me"	Best Country Song	Nominated	
Grammy Awards	2023	"Carolina"	Best Song Written for Visual Media	Nominated	
Grammy Awards	2023	All Too Well: The Short Film	Best Music Video	Won	
Grammy Awards	2024	"Anti-Hero"	Record of the Year	Nominated	
Grammy Awards	2024	"Anti-Hero"	Song of the Year	Nominated	
Grammy Awards	2024	"Anti-Hero"	Best Pop Solo Performance	Nominated	
Grammy Awards	2024	Midnights	Album of the Year	Won	
Grammy Awards	2024	Midnights	Best Pop Vocal Album	Won	
Grammy Awards	2024	"Karma" (featuring Ice Spice)	Best Pop Duo/Group Performance	Nominated	
Grammy Awards	2025	"Fortnight" (featuring Post Malone)	Record of the Year	Nominated	
Grammy Awards	2025	"Fortnight" (featuring Post Malone)	Song of the Year	Nominated	
Grammy Awards	2025	"Fortnight" (featuring Post Malone)	Best Music Video	Nominated	
Grammy Awards	2025	The Tortured Poets Department	Album of the Year	Nominated	
Grammy Awards	2025	The Tortured Poets Department	Best Pop Vocal Album	Nominated	
Grammy Awards	2025	"Us" (with Gracie Abrams)	Best Pop Duo/Group Performance	Nominated	
Grammy Awards	2027	"The Fate of Ophelia"	Record of the Year	Pending	
Grammy Awards	2027	The Life of a Showgirl	Album of the Year	Pending	
Grammy Awards	2027	"I Knew It, I Knew You"	Song of the Year	Pending	
Grammy Awards	2027	"I Knew It, I Knew You"	Best Song Written for Visual Media	Pending	
Grammy Awards	2027	"The Life of a Showgirl" (featuring Sabrina Carpenter)	Best Pop Duo/Group Performance	Pending	
Grand Remi Awards (WorldFest-Houston International Film Festival)	2015	"Shake It Off"	Best Music Video	Won	
Guild of Music Supervisors Awards	2023	"Carolina"	Best Song Written and/or Recorded for a Film	Nominated	
Hit FM Music Awards	2023	Swift	Female Artist of the Year	Won	
Hit FM Music Awards	2023	"The Joker and the Queen" (with Ed Sheeran)	Collaboration of the Year	Won	
Hit FM Music Awards	2023	"Anti-Hero"	Top 10 Singles	Won	
Hit FM Music Awards	2023	"Snow on the Beach" (featuring Lana Del Rey)	Top 10 Singles	Won	
Hito Music Awards	2013	"We Are Never Ever Getting Back Together"	Best Western Song	Won	
Hito Music Awards	2016	"Bad Blood" (featuring Kendrick Lamar)	Best Western Song	Won	
Hito Music Awards	2018	"Look What You Made Me Do"	Best Western Song	Won	
Hito Music Awards	2020	"Me!" (featuring Brendon Urie)	Best Western Song	Won	
Hollywood Critics Association Film Awards	2023	All Too Well: The Short Film	Best Short Film	Won	
Hollywood Music in Media Awards	2022	"Carolina"	Best Original Song in a Feature Film	Nominated	
Hollywood Music in Media Awards	2026	"I Knew It, I Knew You"	Best Original Song in an Animated Film	Won	
The Hollywood Reporter	2026	Swift	Sherry Lansing Leadership Award	Won	
Huading Awards	2020	"Beautiful Ghosts"	Best Global Film Theme Song	Nominated	
IFPI Awards	2015	Swift	Global Recording Artist of 2014	Won	
IFPI Awards	2020	Swift	Global Recording Artist of 2019	Won	
IFPI Awards	2023	Swift	Global Recording Artist of 2022	Won	
IFPI Awards	2023	Midnights	Global Vinyl Album of 2022	Won	
IFPI Awards	2024	Swift	Global Recording Artist of 2023	Won	
IFPI Awards	2024	1989 (Taylor's Version)	Global Vinyl Album of 2023	Won	
IFPI Awards	2025	Swift	Global Recording Artist of 2024	Won	
IFPI Awards	2025	The Tortured Poets Department	Global Album of 2024	Won	
IFPI Awards	2025	The Tortured Poets Department	Global Sales Album of 2024	Won	
IFPI Awards	2025	The Tortured Poets Department	Global Streaming Album of 2024	Won	
IFPI Awards	2025	The Tortured Poets Department	Global Vinyl Album of 2024	Won	
IFPI Awards	2026	Swift	Global Recording Artist of 2025	Won	
IFPI Awards	2026	The Life of a Showgirl	Global Album of 2025	Won	
IFPI Awards	2026	The Life of a Showgirl	Global Sales Album of 2025	Won	
IFPI Awards	2026	The Life of a Showgirl	Global Vinyl Album of 2025	Won	
iHeartRadio Music Awards	2014	Swift	Best Fan Army	Nominated	
iHeartRadio Music Awards	2014	"Highway Don't Care" (with Tim McGraw and Keith Urban)	Country Song of the Year	Nominated	
iHeartRadio Music Awards	2015	Swift	Artist of the Year	Won	
iHeartRadio Music Awards	2015	Swift	Best Fan Army	Nominated	
iHeartRadio Music Awards	2015	"Shake It Off"	Song of the Year	Won	
iHeartRadio Music Awards	2015	"Blank Space"	Best Lyrics	Won	
iHeartRadio Music Awards	2016	Swift	Female Artist of the Year	Won	
iHeartRadio Music Awards	2016	The 1989 World Tour	Best Tour	Won	
iHeartRadio Music Awards	2016	Swift	Best Fan Army	Nominated	
iHeartRadio Music Awards	2016	Swift	Most Meme-able Moment	Won	
iHeartRadio Music Awards	2016	"Blank Space"	Song of the Year	Nominated	
iHeartRadio Music Awards	2016	"Bad Blood" (featuring Kendrick Lamar)	Best Collaboration	Nominated	
iHeartRadio Music Awards	2016	1989	Album of the Year	Won	
iHeartRadio Music Awards	2018	Swift	Female Artist of the Year	Won	
iHeartRadio Music Awards	2018	Swift	Best Fan Army	Nominated	
iHeartRadio Music Awards	2018	"Look What You Made Me Do"	Best Lyrics	Nominated	
iHeartRadio Music Awards	2018	"Look What You Made Me Do"	Best Music Video	Nominated	
iHeartRadio Music Awards	2018	Olivia Benson	Cutest Musician's Pet	Nominated	
iHeartRadio Music Awards	2019	Reputation Stadium Tour	Tour of the Year	Won	
iHeartRadio Music Awards	2019	Swift	Best Fan Army	Nominated	
iHeartRadio Music Awards	2019	"Delicate"	Best Music Video	Won	
iHeartRadio Music Awards	2020	Lover	Pop Album of the Year	Won	
iHeartRadio Music Awards	2020	Swift	Female Artist of the Year	Nominated	
iHeartRadio Music Awards	2020	Swift	Best Fan Army	Nominated	
iHeartRadio Music Awards	2020	"You Need to Calm Down"	Best Lyrics	Nominated	
iHeartRadio Music Awards	2020	"Lover (Remix)" (featuring Shawn Mendes)	Best Remix	Nominated	
iHeartRadio Music Awards	2020	"Me!" (featuring Brendon Urie)	Best Music Video	Nominated	
iHeartRadio Music Awards	2020	"Can't Stop Loving You"	Best Cover Song	Nominated	
iHeartRadio Music Awards	2021	Folklore	Pop Album of the Year	Won	
iHeartRadio Music Awards	2021	Swift	Female Artist of the Year	Nominated	
iHeartRadio Music Awards	2021	Swift	Best Fan Army	Nominated	
iHeartRadio Music Awards	2021	"Cardigan"	Best Lyrics	Nominated	
iHeartRadio Music Awards	2022	"All Too Well (10 Minute Version)"	Best Lyrics	Won	
iHeartRadio Music Awards	2022	Swift	Best Fan Army	Nominated	
iHeartRadio Music Awards	2022	Swift	Female Artist of the Year	Nominated	
iHeartRadio Music Awards	2023	Swift	Innovator Award	Won	
iHeartRadio Music Awards	2023	Swift	Artist of the Year	Nominated	
iHeartRadio Music Awards	2023	Swift	Best Fan Army	Nominated	
iHeartRadio Music Awards	2023	Midnights	Pop Album of the Year	Won	
iHeartRadio Music Awards	2023	"Anti-Hero"	Song of the Year	Won	
iHeartRadio Music Awards	2023	"Anti-Hero"	Best Lyrics	Won	
iHeartRadio Music Awards	2023	"Anti-Hero"	Best Music Video	Nominated	
iHeartRadio Music Awards	2023	"Bejeweled"	TikTok Bop of the Year	Won	
iHeartRadio Music Awards	2023	"Question...?"	Favorite Use of a Sample	Won	
iHeartRadio Music Awards	2024	"Cruel Summer"	Song of the Year	Nominated	
iHeartRadio Music Awards	2024	"Cruel Summer"	Pop Song of the Year	Nominated	
iHeartRadio Music Awards	2024	"Cruel Summer"	TikTok Bop of the Year	Won	
iHeartRadio Music Awards	2024	Swift	Artist of the Year	Won	
iHeartRadio Music Awards	2024	Swift	Pop Artist of the Year	Won	
iHeartRadio Music Awards	2024	Swift	Best Fan Army	Nominated	
iHeartRadio Music Awards	2024	Swift	Favorite Tour Style	Won	
iHeartRadio Music Awards	2024	"Is It Over Now?"	Best Lyrics	Won	
iHeartRadio Music Awards	2024	Taylor Swift: The Eras Tour	Favorite On Screen	Nominated	
iHeartRadio Music Awards	2024	The Eras Tour	Tour of the Year	Won	
iHeartRadio Music Awards	2025	The Eras Tour	Tour of the Century	Won	
iHeartRadio Music Awards	2025	The Eras Tour	Favorite Tour Style	Won	
iHeartRadio Music Awards	2025	Taylor Swift: The Eras Tour (Taylor's Version)	Favorite On Screen	Won	
iHeartRadio Music Awards	2025	Swift	Artist of the Year	Won	
iHeartRadio Music Awards	2025	Swift	Pop Artist of the Year	Nominated	
iHeartRadio Music Awards	2025	"Fortnight" (featuring Post Malone)	Best Collaboration	Nominated	
iHeartRadio Music Awards	2025	"Fortnight" (featuring Post Malone)	Best Lyrics	Won	
iHeartRadio Music Awards	2025	"Fortnight" (featuring Post Malone)	Best Music Video	Won	
iHeartRadio Music Awards	2025	Taylor Swift bringing out Travis Kelce	Favorite Surprise Guest	Won	
iHeartRadio Music Awards	2025	"22" hat	Favorite Tour Tradition	Nominated	
iHeartRadio Music Awards	2025	Surprise songs	Favorite Tour Tradition	Won	
iHeartRadio Music Awards	2025	The Tortured Poets Department	Pop Album of the Year	Won	
iHeartRadio Music Awards	2026	The Life of a Showgirl	Pop Album of the Year	Won	
iHeartRadio Music Awards	2026	The Life of a Showgirl	Album of the Year	Won	
iHeartRadio Music Awards	2026	Swift	Artist of the Year	Won	
iHeartRadio Music Awards	2026	Swift	Pop Artist of the Year	Nominated	
iHeartRadio Music Awards	2026	"The Fate of Ophelia"	Song of the Year	Nominated	
iHeartRadio Music Awards	2026	"The Fate of Ophelia"	Pop Song of the Year	Won	
iHeartRadio Music Awards	2026	"The Fate of Ophelia"	Favorite TikTok Dance	Nominated	
iHeartRadio Music Awards	2026	"The Fate of Ophelia"	Best Lyrics	Won	
iHeartRadio Music Awards	2026	"The Fate of Ophelia"	Best Music Video	Won	
iHeartRadio Music Awards	2026	Taylor Swift: The End of an Era	Favorite On Screen	Nominated	
iHeartRadio Music Awards	2026	The Eras Tour	Favorite Tour Style	Won	
iHeartRadio Titanium Award	2018	"I Don't Wanna Live Forever" (with Zayn)	Winning Songs	Won	
iHeartRadio Titanium Award	2019	"Delicate"	Winning Songs	Won	
Japan Gold Disc Awards	2015	1989	Album of the Year (Western)	Won	
Japan Gold Disc Awards	2015	1989	Best 3 Albums (Western)	Won	
Japan Gold Disc Awards	2018	Reputation	Best 3 Albums (Western)	Won	
Japan Gold Disc Awards	2019	Lover	Best 3 Albums (Western)	Won	
Japan Gold Disc Awards	2019	Lover	Album of the Year (Western)	Won	
Japan Gold Disc Awards	2021	Folklore	Best 3 Albums (Western)	Won	
Japan Gold Disc Awards	2023	Midnights	Best 3 Albums (Western)	Won	
Japan Gold Disc Awards	2025	The Tortured Poets Department	Best 3 Albums (Western)	Won	
Japan Gold Disc Awards	2025	The Tortured Poets Department	Album of the Year (Western)	Won	
Japan Gold Disc Awards	2025	Swift	Artist of the Year (Western)	Won	
Japan Gold Disc Awards	2026	The Life of a Showgirl	Best 3 Albums (Western)	Won	
Joox Indonesia Music Awards	2021	Swift	International Artist of the Year	Won	
Joox Thailand Music Awards	2018	Swift	International Artist of the Year	Nominated	
Joox Thailand Music Awards	2022	Swift	Top Social Global Artist of the Year	Nominated	
Joox Thailand Music Awards	2022	"All Too Well (10 Minute Version)"	International Song of the Year	Nominated	
Juno Awards	2010	Fearless	International Album of the Year	Nominated	
Juno Awards	2011	Speak Now	International Album of the Year	Nominated	
Juno Awards	2013	Red	International Album of the Year	Nominated	
Juno Awards	2015	1989	International Album of the Year	Nominated	
Juno Awards	2018	Reputation	International Album of the Year	Nominated	
Juno Awards	2021	Folklore	International Album of the Year	Nominated	
Juno Awards	2022	Evermore	International Album of the Year	Nominated	
Juno Awards	2023	Red (Taylor's Version)	International Album of the Year	Nominated	
Juno Awards	2023	Midnights	International Album of the Year	Nominated	
Juno Awards	2024	1989 (Taylor's Version)	International Album of the Year	Nominated	
Los 40 Music Awards	2012	Swift	Best International Artist	Won	
Los 40 Music Awards	2015	Swift	Best International Artist	Nominated	
Los 40 Music Awards	2015	"Shake It Off"	Best International Video	Nominated	
Los 40 Music Awards	2015	1989	Best International Album	Nominated	
Los 40 Music Awards	2023	Midnights	Best International Album	Won	
Los 40 Music Awards	2023	Swift	Best International Artist	Nominated	
Los 40 Music Awards	2023	Swift	Best International Live Artist	Nominated	
Los 40 Music Awards	2024	Swift	Best International Live Artist	Nominated	
Los 40 Music Awards	2024	The Tortured Poets Department	Best International Album	Nominated	
Los 40 Music Awards	2026	The Life of a Showgirl	Best International Album	Nominated	
Los 40 Music Awards	2026	"The Fate of Ophelia"	Best International Song	Nominated	
Meteor Music Awards	2010	Swift	Best International Female	Nominated	
MTV Europe Music Awards	2009	Swift	Best New Act	Nominated	
MTV Europe Music Awards	2012	Swift	Best Female	Won	
MTV Europe Music Awards	2012	Speak Now World Tour	Best Live Act	Won	
MTV Europe Music Awards	2012	Swift	Best Look	Won	
MTV Europe Music Awards	2012	Swift	Best Pop	Nominated	
MTV Europe Music Awards	2012	Swift	Best World Stage Performance	Nominated	
MTV Europe Music Awards	2013	Swift	Best Female	Nominated	
MTV Europe Music Awards	2013	The Red Tour	Best Live Act	Nominated	
MTV Europe Music Awards	2013	Swift	Best Pop	Nominated	
MTV Europe Music Awards	2014	Swift	Best Female	Nominated	
MTV Europe Music Awards	2014	Swift	Best Look	Nominated	
MTV Europe Music Awards	2015	"Bad Blood" (featuring Kendrick Lamar)	Best Song	Won	
MTV Europe Music Awards	2015	"Bad Blood" (featuring Kendrick Lamar)	Best Video	Nominated	
MTV Europe Music Awards	2015	"Bad Blood" (featuring Kendrick Lamar)	Best Collaboration	Nominated	
MTV Europe Music Awards	2015	Swift	Best Female	Nominated	
MTV Europe Music Awards	2015	Swift	Best Pop	Nominated	
MTV Europe Music Awards	2015	Swift	Best Live Act	Nominated	
MTV Europe Music Awards	2015	Swift	Biggest Fans	Nominated	
MTV Europe Music Awards	2015	Swift	Best Look	Nominated	
MTV Europe Music Awards	2015	Swift	Best US Act	Won	
MTV Europe Music Awards	2015	Swift	Best Act North American	Nominated	
MTV Europe Music Awards	2017	"Look What You Made Me Do"	Best Video	Nominated	
MTV Europe Music Awards	2017	Swift	Best Artist	Nominated	
MTV Europe Music Awards	2017	Swift	Best Look	Nominated	
MTV Europe Music Awards	2017	Swift	Best Pop	Nominated	
MTV Europe Music Awards	2017	Swift	Biggest Fans	Nominated	
MTV Europe Music Awards	2017	Swift	Best US Act	Nominated	
MTV Europe Music Awards	2018	Swift	Biggest Fans	Nominated	
MTV Europe Music Awards	2019	Swift	Best US Act	Won	
MTV Europe Music Awards	2019	Swift	Best Artist	Nominated	
MTV Europe Music Awards	2019	Swift	Biggest Fans	Nominated	
MTV Europe Music Awards	2019	"Me!" (featuring Brendon Urie)	Best Video	Won	
MTV Europe Music Awards	2020	"The Man"	Best Video	Nominated	
MTV Europe Music Awards	2020	Swift	Best US Act	Nominated	
MTV Europe Music Awards	2020	Swift	Biggest Fans	Nominated	
MTV Europe Music Awards	2021	Swift	Best US Act	Won	
MTV Europe Music Awards	2021	Swift	Biggest Fans	Nominated	
MTV Europe Music Awards	2021	"Willow"	Best Video	Nominated	
MTV Europe Music Awards	2022	All Too Well: The Short Film	Best Video	Won	
MTV Europe Music Awards	2022	All Too Well: The Short Film	Best Longform Video	Won	
MTV Europe Music Awards	2022	Swift	Best Artist	Won	
MTV Europe Music Awards	2022	Swift	Best Pop	Won	
MTV Europe Music Awards	2022	Swift	Best US Act	Nominated	
MTV Europe Music Awards	2022	Swift	Biggest Fans	Nominated	
MTV Europe Music Awards	2023	"Anti-Hero"	Best Song	Nominated	
MTV Europe Music Awards	2023	"Anti-Hero"	Best Video	Won	
MTV Europe Music Awards	2023	Swift	Best Artist	Won	
MTV Europe Music Awards	2023	Swift	Best Pop	Nominated	
MTV Europe Music Awards	2023	Swift	Best Live	Won	
MTV Europe Music Awards	2023	Swift	Best US Act	Nominated	
MTV Europe Music Awards	2023	Swift	Biggest Fans	Nominated	
MTV Europe Music Awards	2024	Swift	Best Artist	Won	
MTV Europe Music Awards	2024	Swift	Best Pop	Nominated	
MTV Europe Music Awards	2024	Swift	Best Live	Won	
MTV Europe Music Awards	2024	Swift	Best US Act	Won	
MTV Europe Music Awards	2024	Swift	Biggest Fans	Nominated	
MTV Europe Music Awards	2024	"Fortnight" (featuring Post Malone)	Best Video	Won	
MTV Europe Music Awards	2024	"Fortnight" (featuring Post Malone)	Best Collaboration	Nominated	
MTV Fandom Awards	2015	Swifties	Fandom Army of the Year	Nominated	
MTV Video Music Awards	2008	"Teardrops on My Guitar"	Best New Artist	Nominated	
MTV Video Music Awards	2009	"You Belong with Me"	Best Female Video	Won	
MTV Video Music Awards	2010	"Fifteen"	Best Female Video	Nominated	
MTV Video Music Awards	2011	"Mean"	Best Video with a Social Message	Nominated	
MTV Video Music Awards	2013	"I Knew You Were Trouble"	Video of the Year	Nominated	
MTV Video Music Awards	2013	"I Knew You Were Trouble"	Best Female Video	Won	
MTV Video Music Awards	2015	"Blank Space"	Best Female Video	Won	
MTV Video Music Awards	2015	"Blank Space"	Best Pop Video	Won	
MTV Video Music Awards	2015	"Bad Blood" (featuring Kendrick Lamar)	Video of the Year	Won	
MTV Video Music Awards	2015	"Bad Blood" (featuring Kendrick Lamar)	Best Collaboration	Won	
MTV Video Music Awards	2015	"Bad Blood" (featuring Kendrick Lamar)	Best Art Direction	Nominated	
MTV Video Music Awards	2015	"Bad Blood" (featuring Kendrick Lamar)	Best Cinematography	Nominated	
MTV Video Music Awards	2015	"Bad Blood" (featuring Kendrick Lamar)	Best Direction	Nominated	
MTV Video Music Awards	2015	"Bad Blood" (featuring Kendrick Lamar)	Best Editing	Nominated	
MTV Video Music Awards	2015	"Bad Blood" (featuring Kendrick Lamar)	Best Visual Effects	Nominated	
MTV Video Music Awards	2015	"Bad Blood" (featuring Kendrick Lamar)	Song of Summer	Nominated	
MTV Video Music Awards	2017	"I Don't Wanna Live Forever" (with Zayn)	Best Collaboration	Won	
MTV Video Music Awards	2018	"Look What You Made Me Do"	Best Art Direction	Nominated	
MTV Video Music Awards	2018	"Look What You Made Me Do"	Best Editing	Nominated	
MTV Video Music Awards	2018	"Look What You Made Me Do"	Best Visual Effects	Nominated	
MTV Video Music Awards	2019	"You Need to Calm Down"	Video of the Year	Won	
MTV Video Music Awards	2019	"You Need to Calm Down"	Song of the Year	Nominated	
MTV Video Music Awards	2019	"You Need to Calm Down"	Best Pop	Nominated	
MTV Video Music Awards	2019	"You Need to Calm Down"	Video for Good	Won	
MTV Video Music Awards	2019	"You Need to Calm Down"	Best Direction	Nominated	
MTV Video Music Awards	2019	"You Need to Calm Down"	Best Editing	Nominated	
MTV Video Music Awards	2019	"You Need to Calm Down"	Best Art Direction	Nominated	
MTV Video Music Awards	2019	"You Need to Calm Down"	Best Power Anthem	Nominated	
MTV Video Music Awards	2019	"You Need to Calm Down"	Song of Summer	Nominated	
MTV Video Music Awards	2019	"Me!" (featuring Brendon Urie)	Best Collaboration	Nominated	
MTV Video Music Awards	2019	"Me!" (featuring Brendon Urie)	Best Visual Effects	Won	
MTV Video Music Awards	2019	"Me!" (featuring Brendon Urie)	Best Cinematography	Nominated	
MTV Video Music Awards	2020	"The Man"	Video of the Year	Nominated	
MTV Video Music Awards	2020	"The Man"	Video for Good	Nominated	
MTV Video Music Awards	2020	"The Man"	Best Direction	Won	
MTV Video Music Awards	2020	"Lover"	Best Pop	Nominated	
MTV Video Music Awards	2020	"Lover"	Best Art Direction	Nominated	
MTV Video Music Awards	2020	"Cardigan"	Song of Summer	Nominated	
MTV Video Music Awards	2021	Swift	Artist of the Year	Nominated	
MTV Video Music Awards	2021	"Willow"	Best Pop	Nominated	
MTV Video Music Awards	2021	"Willow"	Best Art Direction	Nominated	
MTV Video Music Awards	2021	"Willow"	Best Direction	Nominated	
MTV Video Music Awards	2022	All Too Well: The Short Film	Best Direction	Won	
MTV Video Music Awards	2022	All Too Well: The Short Film	Best Editing	Nominated	
MTV Video Music Awards	2022	All Too Well: The Short Film	Best Cinematography	Nominated	
MTV Video Music Awards	2022	All Too Well: The Short Film	Best Long Form Video	Won	
MTV Video Music Awards	2022	All Too Well: The Short Film	Video of the Year	Won	
MTV Video Music Awards	2023	"Anti-Hero"	Video of the Year	Won	
MTV Video Music Awards	2023	"Anti-Hero"	Song of the Year	Won	
MTV Video Music Awards	2023	"Anti-Hero"	Best Pop	Won	
MTV Video Music Awards	2023	"Anti-Hero"	Best Direction	Won	
MTV Video Music Awards	2023	"Anti-Hero"	Best Editing	Nominated	
MTV Video Music Awards	2023	"Anti-Hero"	Best Cinematography	Won	
MTV Video Music Awards	2023	"Anti-Hero"	Best Visual Effects	Won	
MTV Video Music Awards	2023	Swift	Artist of the Year	Won	
MTV Video Music Awards	2023	Swift	Show of the Summer	Won	
MTV Video Music Awards	2023	"Karma" (featuring Ice Spice)	Song of Summer	Nominated	
MTV Video Music Awards	2023	Midnights	Album of the Year	Won	
MTV Video Music Awards	2024	Swift	Artist of the Year	Won	
MTV Video Music Awards	2024	Swift	Best Pop	Won	
MTV Video Music Awards	2024	"Fortnight" (featuring Post Malone)	Video of the Year	Won	
MTV Video Music Awards	2024	"Fortnight" (featuring Post Malone)	Song of the Year	Nominated	
MTV Video Music Awards	2024	"Fortnight" (featuring Post Malone)	Best Collaboration	Won	
MTV Video Music Awards	2024	"Fortnight" (featuring Post Malone)	Best Direction	Won	
MTV Video Music Awards	2024	"Fortnight" (featuring Post Malone)	Best Art Direction	Nominated	
MTV Video Music Awards	2024	"Fortnight" (featuring Post Malone)	Best Editing	Won	
MTV Video Music Awards	2024	"Fortnight" (featuring Post Malone)	Best Cinematography	Nominated	
MTV Video Music Awards	2024	"Fortnight" (featuring Post Malone)	Best Visual Effects	Nominated	
MTV Video Music Awards	2024	"Fortnight" (featuring Post Malone)	Song of Summer	Won	
MTV Video Music Awards	2024	"You Belong with Me"	VMAs Most Iconic Performance	Nominated	
MTV Video Music Awards	2025	Swift	Artist of the Year	Nominated	
MTV Video Music Awards	2026	Swift	Artist of the Year	Nominated	
MTV Video Music Awards	2026	"The Fate of Ophelia"	Video of the Year	Won	
MTV Video Music Awards	2026	"The Fate of Ophelia"	Best Pop	Nominated	
MTV Video Music Awards	2026	"The Fate of Ophelia"	Best Art Direction	Nominated	
MTV Video Music Awards	2026	"The Fate of Ophelia"	Best Cinematography	Nominated	
MTV Video Music Awards	2026	"The Fate of Ophelia"	Best Editing	Nominated	
MTV Video Music Awards	2026	"The Fate of Ophelia"	Best Choreography	Nominated	
MTV Video Music Awards	2026	"The Fate of Ophelia"	Best Visual Effects	Nominated	
MTV Video Music Awards	2026	"Opalite"	Best Direction	Won	
MTV Video Music Awards	2026	"I Knew It, I Knew You"	Song of Summer	Nominated	
MTV Video Music Awards	2026	The Life of a Showgirl	Best Album	Nominated	
MTV Video Music Awards	2026	Swift	MTV VMA Artist Director Honors	Won	
MTV Movie & TV Awards	2010	Valentine's Day	Best Kiss (with Taylor Lautner)	Nominated	
MTV Movie & TV Awards	2021	Miss Americana	Best Music Documentary	Nominated	
MTV Movie & TV Awards	2023	"Carolina"	Best Song	Won	
MTV Italian Music Awards	2014	Swift	Artist Saga	Nominated	
MTV Italian Music Awards	2015	Swift	Wonder Woman	Nominated	
MTV Italian Music Awards	2015	Swift	MTV Awards Star	Nominated	
MTV Italian Music Awards	2016	"Wildest Dreams"	Air Vigorsol Best Fresh Video	Nominated	
MTV Video Music Awards Japan	2011	"Mine"	Best Female Video	Nominated	
MTV Video Music Awards Japan	2011	"Mine"	Best Pop Video	Nominated	
MTV Video Music Awards Japan	2013	"We Are Never Ever Getting Back Together"	Best Female Video	Nominated	
MTV Video Music Awards Japan	2013	"We Are Never Ever Getting Back Together"	Best Pop Video	Nominated	
MTV Video Music Awards Japan	2013	"We Are Never Ever Getting Back Together"	Best Karaoke Video	Nominated	
MTV Video Music Awards Japan	2015	"Blank Space"	Best Female Video – International	Nominated	
MTV Video Music Awards Japan	2019	"Me!" (featuring Brendon Urie)	Best Female Video – International	Won	
MTV Video Music Awards Japan	2026	"The Fate of Ophelia"	Best Solo Artist Video – International	Won	
MTV Millennial Awards	2013	"We Are Never Ever Getting Back Together"	Catchiest Hit of the Year	Won	
MTV Millennial Awards	2015	Swift	Worldwide Instagrammer of the Year	Nominated	
MTV Millennial Awards	2015	"Blank Space"	International Hit of the Year	Nominated	
MTV Millennial Awards	2017	"I Don't Wanna Live Forever" (with Zayn)	Collaboration of the Year	Won	
MTV Millennial Awards	2023	"Anti-Hero"	Global Hit of the Year	Nominated	
MTV Millennial Awards	2024	Swift	Fandom of the Year	Nominated	
MTV Millennial Awards	2024	Swift and Travis Kelce	Epic Kiss of the Year	Nominated	
MTV Millennial Awards	2024	The Eras Tour	Event of the Year	Nominated	
MTV Millennial Awards Brazil	2018	"Look What You Make Me Do"	International Hit	Nominated	
MTV Millennial Awards Brazil	2018	Swift and Katy Perry	Shade of the Year	Won	
MTV Millennial Awards Brazil	2018	Olivia Benson	Pet of the Year	Nominated	
MTV Millennial Awards Brazil	2019	Olivia Benson	Pet of the Year	Nominated	
MTVU Woodie Awards	2015	"Riptide" (Vance Joy)	Best Cover Woodie	Won	
Much Music Video Awards	2010	"You Belong with Me"	International Video of the Year – Artist	Nominated	
Much Music Video Awards	2010	"You Belong with Me"	Your Fave International Video	Nominated	
Much Music Video Awards	2011	"Mine"	Most Watched Video of the Year	Nominated	
Much Music Video Awards	2013	"We Are Never Ever Getting Back Together"	International Video of the Year – Artist	Nominated	
Much Music Video Awards	2013	Swift	Your Fave International Artist/Group	Won	
Much Music Video Awards	2014	"Everything Has Changed" (featuring Ed Sheeran)	International Video of the Year – Artist	Nominated	
Much Music Video Awards	2015	"Blank Space"	International Video of the Year – Artist	Nominated	
Much Music Video Awards	2015	Swift	Your Fave International Artist/Group	Nominated	
Much Music Video Awards	2016	"Bad Blood"	International Artist of the Year	Nominated	
Much Music Video Awards	2016	"Bad Blood"	Most Buzzworthy International Artist or Group	Nominated	
Much Music Video Awards	2016	Swift	Fan Fave International Artist or Group	Nominated	
Much Music Video Awards	2018	Swift	Fan Fave Artist	Nominated	
Music Awards Japan	2025	"Fortnight" (featuring Post Malone)	Best International Pop Song in Japan	Nominated	
Music Awards Japan	2025	"Fortnight" (featuring Post Malone)	Best of Listeners' Choice: International Song	Nominated	
Music Awards Japan	2026	"The Fate of Ophelia"	Best International Pop Song in Japan	Nominated	
Music Awards Japan	2026	"The Fate of Ophelia"	Best of Listeners' Choice: International Song	Nominated	
Music Business Association Awards	2010	Swift	Artist of the Year	Won	
MusicDaily Awards	2021	Swift	Best Artist	Won	
MVPA Awards	2020	"Lover"	Best Production Design in a Video	Nominated	
MVPA Awards	2020	"Cardigan"	Best Visual Effects in a Video	Nominated	
Myx Music Awards	2010	"Love Story"	Favorite International Video	Won	
Myx Music Awards	2013	"We Are Never Ever Getting Back Together"	Favorite International Video	Nominated	
Myx Music Awards	2015	"Shake It Off"	Favorite International Video	Won	
Myx Music Awards	2016	"Bad Blood" (featuring Kendrick Lamar)	Favorite International Video	Won	
Myx Music Awards	2018	"Look What You Made Me Do"	Favorite International Video	Nominated	
Myx Music Awards	2019	"Delicate"	Favorite International Video	Nominated	
Myx Music Awards	2020	"Lover"	Favorite International Video	Nominated	
Myx Music Awards	2021	"Cardigan"	Favorite International Video	Nominated	
Myx Music Awards	2024	"Fortnight" (featuring Post Malone)	Global Video of the Year	Nominated	
Nashville Songwriter Awards	2007	Swift (Note: Tied with Alan Jackson)	Songwriter-Artist of the Year	Won	
Nashville Songwriter Awards	2009	Swift	Songwriter-Artist of the Year	Won	
Nashville Songwriter Awards	2010	Swift	Songwriter-Artist of the Year	Won	
Nashville Songwriter Awards	2011	Swift	Songwriter-Artist of the Year	Won	
Nashville Songwriter Awards	2012	Swift	Songwriter-Artist of the Year	Won	
Nashville Songwriter Awards	2013	Swift	Songwriter-Artist of the Year	Won	
Nashville Songwriter Awards	2015	Swift	Songwriter-Artist of the Year	Won	
Nashville Songwriter Awards	2015	"Shake It Off"	Ten Songs I Wish I'd Written	Won	
Nashville Songwriter Awards	2017	"Better Man"	Ten Songs I Wish I'd Written	Won	
Nashville Songwriter Awards	2020	"Lover"	Ten Songs I Wish I'd Written	Won	
Nashville Songwriter Awards	2021	"Cardigan"	Ten Songs I Wish I'd Written	Won	
Nashville Songwriter Awards	2021	"Willow"	Ten Songs I Wish I'd Written	Won	
Nashville Songwriter Awards	2022	Swift	Songwriter-Artist of the Decade	Won	
Nashville Songwriter Awards	2023	"Anti-Hero"	Ten Songs I Wish I'd Written	Won	
Nashville Songwriters Hall of Fame	2026	Swift	Hall of Fame Award	Won	
Nashville Symphony Ball	2011	Swift	Harmony Award	Won	
National Music Publishers' Association	2021	Swift	Songwriter Icon	Won	
Neox Fan Awards	2013	"22"	Best Song of the Year	Nominated	
NetEase Annual Music Awards	2020	Swift	Top Western Act	Won	
NetEase Annual Music Awards	2020	Folklore	Top Western Album	Won	
NetEase Annual Music Awards	2020	Folklore	Top Folk Music Album	Won	
NetEase Annual Music Awards	2022	Midnights (3am Edition)	Top English Album	Won	
NetEase Annual Music Awards	2023	1989 (Taylor's Version)	Top English Album	Won	
NetEase Annual Music Awards	2024	The Tortured Poets Department: The Anthology	Top English Album	Won	
NetEase Annual Music Awards	2024	"Fortnight" (feat Post Malone)	Top English Single	Won	
New Music Awards	2015	Swift	AC Female Artist of the Year	Won	
New Music Awards	2016	Swift	AC Female Artist of the Year	Won	
New Music Awards	2024	"Cruel Summer"	Top 40/CHR Song of the Year	Won	
New Music Awards	2024	"Karma"	AC Song of the Year	Nominated	
New Music Awards	2024	Swift	Top 40/CHR Female Artist of the Year	Won	
New Music Awards	2024	Swift	AC Female Artist of the Year	Nominated	
New Music Awards	2025	"Fortnight"	Top 40/CHR Song of the Year	Nominated	
New Music Awards	2025	Swift	Top 40/CHR Female Artist of the Year	Nominated	
New Music Awards	2025	Swift	AC Female Artist of the Year	Nominated	
Nickelodeon Kids' Choice Awards	2010	Swift	Favorite Female Singer	Won	
Nickelodeon Kids' Choice Awards	2010	"You Belong with Me"	Favorite Song	Won	
Nickelodeon Kids' Choice Awards	2011	Swift	Favorite Female Singer	Nominated	
Nickelodeon Kids' Choice Awards	2011	"Mine"	Favorite Song	Nominated	
Nickelodeon Kids' Choice Awards	2012	Swift	Favorite Female Singer	Nominated	
Nickelodeon Kids' Choice Awards	2012	"Sparks Fly"	Favorite Song	Nominated	
Nickelodeon Kids' Choice Awards	2012	Swift	The Big Help Award	Won	
Nickelodeon Kids' Choice Awards	2013	Swift	Favorite Female Singer	Nominated	
Nickelodeon Kids' Choice Awards	2013	"We Are Never Ever Getting Back Together"	Favorite Song	Nominated	
Nickelodeon Kids' Choice Awards	2013	The Lorax	Favorite Voice in an Animated Movie	Nominated	
Nickelodeon Kids' Choice Awards	2014	Swift	Favorite Female Singer	Nominated	
Nickelodeon Kids' Choice Awards	2014	"I Knew You Were Trouble"	Favorite Song	Nominated	
Nickelodeon Kids' Choice Awards	2015	Swift	Favorite Female Singer	Nominated	
Nickelodeon Kids' Choice Awards	2015	"Shake It Off"	Favorite Song	Nominated	
Nickelodeon Kids' Choice Awards	2016	Swift	Favorite Female Singer	Nominated	
Nickelodeon Kids' Choice Awards	2016	"Bad Blood" (featuring Kendrick Lamar)	Favorite Song	Nominated	
Nickelodeon Kids' Choice Awards	2016	"Bad Blood" (featuring Kendrick Lamar)	Favorite Collaboration	Nominated	
Nickelodeon Kids' Choice Awards	2018	Swift	Favorite Female Singer	Nominated	
Nickelodeon Kids' Choice Awards	2018	Swift	Favorite Global Music Star	Nominated	
Nickelodeon Kids' Choice Awards	2018	"Look What You Made Me Do"	Favorite Song	Nominated	
Nickelodeon Kids' Choice Awards	2019	Swift	Favorite Female Artist	Nominated	
Nickelodeon Kids' Choice Awards	2019	Swift	Favorite Global Music Star	Won	
Nickelodeon Kids' Choice Awards	2019	"Delicate"	Favorite Song	Nominated	
Nickelodeon Kids' Choice Awards	2020	Cats	Favorite Movie Actress	Nominated	
Nickelodeon Kids' Choice Awards	2020	"You Need to Calm Down"	Favorite Song	Nominated	
Nickelodeon Kids' Choice Awards	2020	"Me!" (featuring Brendon Urie)	Favorite Collaboration	Nominated	
Nickelodeon Kids' Choice Awards	2020	Swift	Favorite Female Artist	Nominated	
Nickelodeon Kids' Choice Awards	2020	Swift	Favorite Global Music Star	Won	
Nickelodeon Kids' Choice Awards	2021	"Cardigan"	Favorite Song	Nominated	
Nickelodeon Kids' Choice Awards	2021	Swift	Favorite Female Artist	Nominated	
Nickelodeon Kids' Choice Awards	2021	Swift	Favorite Global Music Star	Nominated	
Nickelodeon Kids' Choice Awards	2022	Swift	Favorite Female Artist	Nominated	
Nickelodeon Kids' Choice Awards	2022	"All Too Well (10 Minute Version)"	Favorite Song	Nominated	
Nickelodeon Kids' Choice Awards	2022	Fearless (Taylor's Version)	Favorite Album	Nominated	
Nickelodeon Kids' Choice Awards	2022	Red (Taylor's Version)	Favorite Album	Nominated	
Nickelodeon Kids' Choice Awards	2023	Midnights	Favorite Album	Won	
Nickelodeon Kids' Choice Awards	2023	"Anti-Hero"	Favorite Song	Nominated	
Nickelodeon Kids' Choice Awards	2023	"Bejeweled"	Favorite Song	Nominated	
Nickelodeon Kids' Choice Awards	2023	Swift	Favorite Female Artist	Won	
Nickelodeon Kids' Choice Awards	2023	Swift	Favorite Global Music Star	Nominated	
Nickelodeon Kids' Choice Awards	2023	Olivia Benson	Favorite Pet	Won	
Nickelodeon Kids' Choice Awards	2024	Swift	Favorite Female Artist	Won	
Nickelodeon Kids' Choice Awards	2024	Swift	Favorite Global Music Star	Won	
Nickelodeon Kids' Choice Awards	2024	The Eras Tour	Favorite Ticket of the Year	Won	
Nickelodeon Kids' Choice Awards	2024	The Tortured Poets Department: The Anthology	Favorite Album	Nominated	
Nickelodeon Kids' Choice Awards	2024	"Karma" (featuring Ice Spice)	Favorite Music Collaboration	Nominated	
Nickelodeon Kids' Choice Awards	2024	"Fortnight" (featuring Post Malone)	Favorite Music Collaboration	Nominated	
Nickelodeon Kids' Choice Awards	2025	Swift	Favorite Female Artist	Nominated	
Nickelodeon Kids' Choice Awards	2025	"I Can Do It with a Broken Heart"	Favorite Song	Nominated	
Nickelodeon Kids' Choice Awards	2026	Swift	Favorite Female Artist	Nominated	
Nickelodeon Kids' Choice Awards	2026	Swift	Favorite Global Music Star	Nominated	
Nickelodeon Kids' Choice Awards	2026	"The Fate of Ophelia"	Favorite Song	Nominated	
Nickelodeon Kids' Choice Awards	2026	"I Knew It, I Knew You"	Favorite Song from a Movie	Nominated	
Nickelodeon Kids' Choice Awards	2026	"The Life of a Showgirl" (featuring Sabrina Carpenter)	Favorite Music Collaboration	Nominated	
Nickelodeon Kids' Choice Awards	2026	The Life of a Showgirl	Favorite Album	Nominated	
Meus Prêmios Nick	2021	"Willow"	Video of the Year	Nominated	
Nickelodeon Australian Kids' Choice Awards	2009	Swift	Fave International Singer	Nominated	
Nickelodeon Australian Kids' Choice Awards	2009	"Love Story"	Fave Song	Nominated	
Nickelodeon Australian Kids' Choice Awards	2010	Valentine's Day (with Taylor Lautner)	Fave Kiss	Nominated	
Nickelodeon Australian Kids' Choice Awards	2010	Swift	Hottest Hottie	Nominated	
Nickelodeon Australian Kids' Choice Awards	2013	Swift	Aussie's Fave Music Act	Nominated	
Nickelodeon Australian Kids' Choice Awards	2013	"I Knew You Were Trouble"	Aussie's Fave Song	Nominated	
Nickelodeon Australian Kids' Choice Awards	2015	Swift	Aussie/Kiwi's Favourite Fan Army	Nominated	
Nickelodeon Australian Kids' Choice Awards	2015	Meredith Grey and Olivia Benson	Aussie/Kiwi's Favourite Animal	Nominated	
Nickelodeon Argentina Kids' Choice Awards	2013	"We Are Never Ever Getting Back Together"	Favorite International Song	Nominated	
Nickelodeon Argentina Kids' Choice Awards	2015	Swift	Favorite International Artist or Group	Nominated	
Nickelodeon Colombia Kids' Choice Awards	2015	Swift	Favorite International Artist or Group	Nominated	
Nickelodeon Mexico Kids' Choice Awards	2015	Swift	Favorite International Artist or Group	Nominated	
Nickelodeon Mexico Kids' Choice Awards	2023	Swift	Favorite Global Artist	Won	
Nickelodeon Mexico Kids' Choice Awards	2023	Swift	Master Fandom	Nominated	
Nickelodeon Mexico Kids' Choice Awards	2023	"Lavender Haze"	Global Hit of the Year	Nominated	
Nickelodeon UK Kids' Choice Awards	2015	Swift	UK Favorite Fan Army	Nominated	
Nickelodeon UK Kids' Choice Awards	2016	Swift	UK Favourite Fan Family	Nominated	
Nickelodeon UK Kids' Choice Awards	2016	Meredith Grey	UK Favourite Famous Cat	Nominated	
Nickelodeon UK Kids' Choice Awards	2016	Olivia Benson	UK Favourite Famous Cat	Nominated	
NME Awards	2015	Swift	Hero of the Year	Nominated	
NME Awards	2015	Swift	Villain of the Year	Nominated	
NME Awards	2016	Swift	Hero of the Year	Nominated	
NME Awards	2016	Swift	Best International Solo Artist	Won	
NME Awards	2018	Swift	Best International Solo Artist	Nominated	
NME Awards	2018	"Look What You Made Me Do"	Best Music Video	Nominated	
NME Awards	2020	Swift	Best Solo Act in the World	Won	
NME Awards	2022	Red (Taylor's Version)	Best Reissue	Won	
NME Awards	2022	All Too Well: The Short Film	Best Music Video	Nominated	
Northwest Tennessee Disaster Services	2012	Swift	Honorary Star of Compassion	Won	
NRJ Music Awards	2015	Swift	International Female Artist of the Year	Won	
NRJ Music Awards	2015	"Bad Blood" (featuring Kendrick Lamar)	Video of the Year	Won	
NRJ Music Awards	2017	Swift	International Female Artist of the Year	Nominated	
NRJ Music Awards	2017	"Look What You Made Me Do"	Video of the Year	Nominated	
NRJ Music Awards	2019	Swift	International Female Artist of the Year	Nominated	
NRJ Music Awards	2023	Swift	International Female Artist of the Year	Nominated	
NRJ Music Awards	2023	"Anti-Hero"	International Video of the Year	Nominated	
NRJ Music Awards	2024	Swift	International Female Artist of the Year	Won	
NRJ Music Awards	2024	Swift	Concert of the Year	Nominated	
NRJ Music Awards	2024	"Fortnight" (featuring Post Malone)	International Collaboration of the Year	Nominated	
O Music Awards	2012	Swift	Fan Army FTW	Nominated	
O Music Awards	2012	Swift	Most Extreme Fan Outreach	Won	
OFM Music Awards	2015	1989	Album of the Year	Won	
People's Choice Awards	2009	"Love Story"	Favorite Country Song	Nominated	
People's Choice Awards	2009	Swift	Favorite Star Under 35	Nominated	
People's Choice Awards	2010	Swift	Favorite Female Artist	Won	
People's Choice Awards	2010	Swift	Favorite Country Artist	Nominated	
People's Choice Awards	2010	Swift	Favorite Pop Artist	Nominated	
People's Choice Awards	2011	Swift	Favorite Female Artist	Nominated	
People's Choice Awards	2011	Swift	Favorite Country Artist	Won	
People's Choice Awards	2012	Swift	Favorite Female Artist	Nominated	
People's Choice Awards	2012	Swift	Favorite Country Artist	Won	
People's Choice Awards	2012	Swift	Favorite Tour Headliner	Nominated	
People's Choice Awards	2013	"We Are Never Ever Getting Back Together"	Favorite Song	Nominated	
People's Choice Awards	2013	Swift	Favorite Female Artist	Nominated	
People's Choice Awards	2013	Swift	Favorite Country Artist	Won	
People's Choice Awards	2014	Swift	Favorite Country Artist	Won	
People's Choice Awards	2015	"Shake It Off"	Favorite Song	Won	
People's Choice Awards	2015	Swift	Favorite Female Artist	Won	
People's Choice Awards	2015	Swift	Favorite Pop Artist	Won	
People's Choice Awards	2016	"Bad Blood" (featuring Kendrick Lamar)	Favorite Song	Nominated	
People's Choice Awards	2016	Swift	Favorite Female Artist	Won	
People's Choice Awards	2016	Swift	Favorite Pop Artist	Won	
People's Choice Awards	2016	Swift	Favorite Social Media Celebrity	Nominated	
People's Choice Awards	2018	Reputation Stadium Tour	Concert Tour of the Year	Won	
People's Choice Awards	2018	Swift	Female Artist of the Year	Nominated	
People's Choice Awards	2018	Swift	Social Celebrity of the Year	Nominated	
People's Choice Awards	2019	Lover	Album of the Year	Won	
People's Choice Awards	2019	"Me!" (featuring Brendon Urie)	Music Video of the Year	Nominated	
People's Choice Awards	2019	Swift	Social Celebrity of the Year	Nominated	
People's Choice Awards	2019	Swift	Female Artist of the Year	Nominated	
People's Choice Awards	2020	Swift	Female Artist of the Year	Nominated	
People's Choice Awards	2020	Folklore	Album of the Year	Nominated	
People's Choice Awards	2020	"Only the Young"	Soundtrack Song of the Year	Won	
People's Choice Awards	2022	Midnights	Album of the Year	Won	
People's Choice Awards	2022	"Anti-Hero"	Music Video of the Year	Won	
People's Choice Awards	2022	Swift	Female Artist of the Year	Won	
People's Choice Awards	2024	Swift	Female Artist of the Year	Won	
People's Choice Awards	2024	Swift	Pop Artist of the Year	Won	
People's Choice Awards	2024	Swift	Social Celebrity of the Year	Won	
People's Choice Awards	2024	The Eras Tour	Concert Tour of the Year	Won	
People's Choice Awards	2024	Taylor Swift: The Eras Tour	Movie of the Year	Nominated	
Pollstar Awards	2019	Reputation Stadium Tour	Best Pop Tour	Won	
Pollstar Awards	2021	Swift	Touring Artist of the Decade	Nominated	
Pollstar Awards	2021	Swift	Pop Touring Artist of the Decade	Nominated	
Pollstar Awards	2024	The Eras Tour	Major Tour of the Year	Won	
Pollstar Awards	2024	The Eras Tour	Pop Tour of the Year	Nominated	
Pollstar Awards	2024	AMC x Taylor Swift: The Eras Tour Theatrical Exhibition	Brand Partnership/Live Campaign of the Year	Won	
Pollstar Awards	2025	The Eras Tour	Major Tour of the Year	Won	
Pollstar Awards	2025	The Eras Tour	Pop Tour of the Year	Nominated	
Premios Juventud	2015	"Blank Space"	Favorite Hit	Nominated	
Premios Juventud	2015	Swift	Favorite Hitmaker	Nominated	
Premios MUSA	2023	Swift	International Anglophone Artist of the Year	Won	
Premios MUSA	2023	"Anti-Hero"	International Anglophone Song of the Year	Nominated	
Premios Odeón	2022	Swift	International Odeón Artist	Nominated	
Premios Odeón	2025	The Tortured Poets Department	International Album of the Year	Won	
Premios Odeón	2026	The Life of a Showgirl	International Album of the Year	Won	
Primetime Emmy Awards	2015	AMEX Unstaged: Taylor Swift Experience	Outstanding Creative Achievement in Interactive Media — Original Interactive Program	Won	
Primetime Emmy Awards	2026	Taylor Swift: The Eras Tour: The Final Show	Outstanding Variety Special (Pre-Recorded)	Nominated	
Q Awards	2015	Swift	Best Solo Artist	Nominated	
Q Awards	2018	Swift	Best Live Artist	Won	
Queerty Awards	2019	"You Need to Calm Down"	Queer Anthem	Runner-up	
Radio Disney Music Awards	2013	"I Knew You Were Trouble"	Song of the Year	Won	
Radio Disney Music Awards	2013	"We Are Never Ever Getting Back Together"	Best Break Up Song	Won	
Radio Disney Music Awards	2013	Swift	Best Female Artist	Nominated	
Radio Disney Music Awards	2014	"Everything Has Changed" (featuring Ed Sheeran)	Best Musical Collaboration	Won	
Radio Disney Music Awards	2014	Swift	Fiercest Fans	Won	
Radio Disney Music Awards	2014	Swift	Best Female Artist	Nominated	
Radio Disney Music Awards	2015	"Shake It Off"	Song of the Year	Nominated	
Radio Disney Music Awards	2015	"Shake It Off"	Best Song to Dance To	Won	
Radio Disney Music Awards	2015	Swift	Best Female Artist	Nominated	
Radio Disney Music Awards	2015	Swift	Most Talked About Artist	Nominated	
Radio Disney Music Awards	2016	"Bad Blood" (featuring Kendrick Lamar)	Song of the Year	Won	
Radio Disney Music Awards	2016	"Bad Blood" (featuring Kendrick Lamar)	Best Breakup Song	Won	
Radio Disney Music Awards	2016	Swift	Best Female Artist	Nominated	
Radio Disney Music Awards	2016	Swift	Most Talked About Artist	Won	
Radio Disney Music Awards	2016	Swift	Artist With The Best Style	Nominated	
Radio Disney Music Awards	2016	Swift	Fiercest Fans	Nominated	
Radio Disney Music Awards	2017	"I Don't Wanna Live Forever" (with Zayn)	Best Collaboration	Nominated	
Radio Disney Music Awards	2018	Swift	Best Artist	Nominated	
Radio Disney Music Awards	2018	"Look What You Made Me Do"	Song of the Year	Nominated	
Radio Disney Music Awards	2018	"Look What You Made Me Do"	Best Song To Lip-Sync To	Nominated	
Robert F. Kennedy Center for Justice and Human Rights	2012	Swift	Ripple of Hope Award	Won	
Rockbjörnen	2015	"Shake It Off"	Best Foreign Tune	Nominated	
Rockbjörnen	2023	"Anti-Hero"	Best Foreign Tune	Nominated	
RTHK International Pop Poll Awards	2013	"We Are Never Ever Getting Back Together"	Top Ten International Gold Songs	Won	
RTHK International Pop Poll Awards	2013	Red	The Best Selling English Album	Won	
RTHK International Pop Poll Awards	2013	Swift	Top Female Artist	Gold	
RTHK International Pop Poll Awards	2015	"Shake It Off"	Top Ten International Gold Songs	Won	
RTHK International Pop Poll Awards	2015	"Shake It Off"	Super Gold Song	Won	
RTHK International Pop Poll Awards	2015	1989	The Best Selling English Album	Won	
RTHK International Pop Poll Awards	2015	Swift	Top Female Artist	Gold	
RTHK International Pop Poll Awards	2016	"Style"	Top Ten International Gold Songs	Won	
RTHK International Pop Poll Awards	2016	Swift	Top Female Artist	Gold	
RTHK International Pop Poll Awards	2018	"Look What You Make Me Do"	Top Ten International Gold Songs	Won	
RTHK International Pop Poll Awards	2018	Reputation	The Best Selling English Album	Won	
RTHK International Pop Poll Awards	2018	Swift	Top Female Artist	Gold	
RTHK International Pop Poll Awards	2020	"Lover"	Top Ten International Gold Songs	Won	
RTHK International Pop Poll Awards	2020	Lover	The Best Selling English Album	Won	
RTHK International Pop Poll Awards	2020	Swift	Top Female Artist	Silver	
RTHK International Pop Poll Awards	2021	"Cardigan"	Top Ten International Gold Songs	Won	
RTHK International Pop Poll Awards	2021	"Cardigan"	Super Gold Song	Won	
RTHK International Pop Poll Awards	2021	Swift	Top Female Artist	Gold	
RTHK International Pop Poll Awards	2022	"Mr. Perfectly Fine"	Top Ten International Gold Songs	Won	
RTHK International Pop Poll Awards	2022	Swift	Top Female Artist	Gold	
RTHK International Pop Poll Awards	2023	"Anti-Hero"	Top Ten International Gold Songs	Won	
RTHK International Pop Poll Awards	2023	"Anti-Hero"	Super Gold Song	Won	
RTHK International Pop Poll Awards	2023	Midnights	Top English Album	Won	
RTHK International Pop Poll Awards	2023	Swift	Top Female Artist	Gold	
RTHK International Pop Poll Awards	2024	Swift	Top Female Singer	Won	
RTHK International Pop Poll Awards	2024	The Tortured Poets Department	Top English Album	Won	
RTHK International Pop Poll Awards	2024	"You're Losing Me"	Top Ten International Gold Songs	Won	
RTHK International Pop Poll Awards	2024	"You're Losing Me"	Super Gold Song	Won	
Satellite Awards	2018	"I Don't Wanna Live Forever" (with Zayn)	Best Original Song	Nominated	
Satellite Awards	2023	"Carolina"	Best Original Song	Nominated	
Shorty Awards	2015	Swift	Best Singer	Won	
Shorty Awards	2016	Swift	Best Singer	Won	
Shorty Awards	2021	Folklore: The Long Pond Studio Sessions	Best Use of Emojis	Nominated	
SiriusXM Indie Awards	2009	"Love Story"	Favourite International Single	Nominated	
SiriusXM Indie Awards	2009	Fearless	Favourite International Album	Won	
SiriusXM Indie Awards	2009	Swift	Favourite International Solo Artist	Nominated	
SiriusXM Indie Awards	2011	Swift	International Solo Artist of the Year	Won	
SiriusXM Indie Awards	2012	Swift	International Solo Artist of the Year	Nominated	
SiriusXM Indie Awards	2012	Speak Now	International Album of the Year	Nominated	
SiriusXM Indie Awards	2013	Swift	International Artist of the Year	Won	
SiriusXM Indie Awards	2013	Red	International Album of the Year	Nominated	
SiriusXM Indie Awards	2013	"We Are Never Ever Getting Back Together"	International Single of the Year	Nominated	
SiriusXM Indie Awards	2013	"We Are Never Ever Getting Back Together"	International Video of the Year	Nominated	
Society of Composers & Lyricists	2023	"Carolina"	Outstanding Song in a Drama or Documentary	Nominated	
Songwriters Hall of Fame	2010	Swift	Hal David Starlight Award	Won	
Songwriters Hall of Fame	2026	Swift	Hall of Fame Award	Won	
Space Shower Music Awards	2016	Swift	Best International Artist	Nominated	
TEC Awards	2019	"Look What You Made Me Do"	Best Record Production / Single or Track	Nominated	
Teen Choice Awards	2008	Swift	Choice Breakout Artist	Won	
Teen Choice Awards	2009	Swift	Choice Female Artist	Won	
Teen Choice Awards	2009	"Love Story"	Choice Love Song	Nominated	
Teen Choice Awards	2009	Fearless	Choice Female Album	Won	
Teen Choice Awards	2009	Fearless Tour	Choice Music Tour	Nominated	
Teen Choice Awards	2010	Swift (with Taylor Lautner)	Choice Chemistry	Nominated	
Teen Choice Awards	2010	Swift (with Taylor Lautner)	Choice Liplock	Nominated	
Teen Choice Awards	2010	Swift	Choice Breakout Female	Won	
Teen Choice Awards	2010	Swift	Choice Female Artist	Nominated	
Teen Choice Awards	2010	Swift	Choice Female Country Artist	Won	
Teen Choice Awards	2010	"Fifteen"	Choice Country Song	Won	
Teen Choice Awards	2010	Fearless	Choice Country Album	Won	
Teen Choice Awards	2011	Swift	Red Carpet Hot Icon – Female	Won	
Teen Choice Awards	2011	Swift	Choice Female Artist	Won	
Teen Choice Awards	2011	Swift	Choice Female Country Artist	Won	
Teen Choice Awards	2011	Swift	Ultimate Choice	Won	
Teen Choice Awards	2011	"Mean"	Choice Country Song	Won	
Teen Choice Awards	2011	"Back to December"	Choice Break-Up Song	Won	
Teen Choice Awards	2011	"Mine"	Choice Love Song	Nominated	
Teen Choice Awards	2012	Swift	Choice Female Artist	Won	
Teen Choice Awards	2012	Swift	Choice Female Country Artist	Won	
Teen Choice Awards	2012	The Lorax	Choice Voice	Won	
Teen Choice Awards	2012	"Eyes Open"	Choice Single by a Female Artist	Won	
Teen Choice Awards	2012	"Sparks Fly"	Choice Country Song	Won	
Teen Choice Awards	2013	Swift	Choice Female Artist	Nominated	
Teen Choice Awards	2013	Swift	Choice Female Country Artist	Won	
Teen Choice Awards	2013	Swift	Choice Smile	Nominated	
Teen Choice Awards	2013	"I Knew You Were Trouble"	Choice Single by a Female Artist	Nominated	
Teen Choice Awards	2013	"We Are Never Ever Getting Back Together"	Choice Country Song	Won	
Teen Choice Awards	2013	"We Are Never Ever Getting Back Together"	Choice Break-Up Song	Nominated	
Teen Choice Awards	2013	"Red Tour"	Choice Summer Tour	Nominated	
Teen Choice Awards	2014	Swift	Choice Female Artist	Nominated	
Teen Choice Awards	2014	Swift	Choice Female Country Artist	Won	
Teen Choice Awards	2014	Swift	Choice Smile	Nominated	
Teen Choice Awards	2014	Swift	Choice Social Media Queen	Nominated	
Teen Choice Awards	2014	Swift	Choice Instagrammer	Nominated	
Teen Choice Awards	2014	Swift	Choice Fanatic Fans	Nominated	
Teen Choice Awards	2015	Swift	Choice Female Artist	Nominated	
Teen Choice Awards	2015	Swift	Choice Female Hottie	Nominated	
Teen Choice Awards	2015	Swift	Choice Summer Music Star: Female	Won	
Teen Choice Awards	2015	Swift	Choice Social Media Queen	Nominated	
Teen Choice Awards	2015	Swift	Choice Twit	Won	
Teen Choice Awards	2015	"Shake It Off"	Choice Single by a Female Artist	Nominated	
Teen Choice Awards	2015	"Bad Blood" (featuring Kendrick Lamar)	Choice Break-Up Song	Won	
Teen Choice Awards	2015	"Bad Blood" (featuring Kendrick Lamar)	Choice Music Collaboration	Won	
Teen Choice Awards	2015	"Bad Blood" (featuring Kendrick Lamar)	Choice Summer Song	Nominated	
Teen Choice Awards	2015	"Blank Space"	Choice Party Song	Nominated	
Teen Choice Awards	2015	"1989 World Tour"	Choice Summer Tour	Nominated	
Teen Choice Awards	2016	Swift	Choice Female Artist	Nominated	
Teen Choice Awards	2016	"New Romantics"	Choice Song by a Female Artist	Nominated	
Teen Choice Awards	2017	"I Don't Wanna Live Forever" (with Zayn)	Choice Music Collaboration	Nominated	
Teen Choice Awards	2017	Swift	Choice Instagrammer	Nominated	
Teen Choice Awards	2018	Swift	Choice Female Artist	Nominated	
Teen Choice Awards	2018	"Look What You Made Me Do"	Choice Song by a Female Artist	Nominated	
Teen Choice Awards	2018	"End Game"	Choice Music Collaboration	Nominated	
Teen Choice Awards	2018	"Delicate"	Choice Pop Song	Nominated	
Teen Choice Awards	2018	Reputation Stadium Tour	Choice Summer Tour	Nominated	
Teen Choice Awards	2018	Swift	Choice Fandom	Nominated	
Teen Choice Awards	2019	Swift	Icon Award	Won	
Teen Choice Awards	2019	Swift	Choice Female Artist	Nominated	
Teen Choice Awards	2019	Swift	Choice Summer Female Artist	Nominated	
Teen Choice Awards	2019	Swift	Choice Social Star	Nominated	
Teen Choice Awards	2019	"Me!" (featuring Brendon Urie)	Choice Song by a Female Artist	Nominated	
Teen Choice Awards	2019	"Me!" (featuring Brendon Urie)	Choice Pop Song	Nominated	
Teen Choice Awards	2019	"You Need to Calm Down"	Choice Summer Song	Nominated	
Teen Choice Awards	2019	Swift	Choice Fandom	Nominated	
Telehit Awards	2013	Red	Best Female Pop Album	Won	
Telehit Awards	2015	Swift	Best Female Artist	Won	
Telehit Awards	2015	"Bad Blood" (featuring Kendrick Lamar)	Video of the Year	Won	
Telehit Awards	2019	Swift	Best Solo Female Act	Nominated	
Telehit Awards	2019	"You Need to Calm Down"	Best Anglo Video	Nominated	
Telehit Awards	2019	"You Need to Calm Down"	People's Best Video	Nominated	
Tencent Music Entertainment Awards	2020	Swift	Best Foreign Artist	Won	
Tencent Music Entertainment Awards	2021	Swift	Best Foreign Artist	Won	
Tencent Music Entertainment Awards	2023	Swift	Best Foreign Artist	Won	
Tencent Music Entertainment Awards	2024	Swift	Best Foreign Artist	Won	
Ticketmaster Awards	2018	Swift	Artist of the Year	Won	
Ticketmaster Awards	2019	Reputation Stadium Tour	Touring Milestone Award	Won	
UK Music Video Awards	2015	"Bad Blood" (featuring Kendrick Lamar)	Best Pop Video – International	Nominated	
UK Music Video Awards	2015	"Bad Blood" (featuring Kendrick Lamar)	Best Styling	Nominated	
UK Music Video Awards	2020	"Cardigan"	Best Visual Effects in a Video	Nominated	
UK Music Video Awards	2022	All Too Well: The Short Film	Best Cinematography in a Video	Nominated	
UK Music Video Awards	2026	"Opalite"	Best Production Design in a Video	Nominated	
V Chart Awards	2013	Swift	Favorite Artist of the Year (Western)	Won	
V Chart Awards	2014	"22"	Best Music Video of the Year	Won	
V Chart Awards	2015	"Blank Space"	Best Music Video of the Year	Won	
V Chart Awards	2015	Swift	Favorite Artist of the Year (Western)	Won	
V Chart Awards	2015	Swift	Top Female Artist (Western)	Won	
V Chart Awards	2016	Swift	Top Female Artist (Western)	Won	
V Chart Awards	2017	Swift	Favorite Artist of the Year (Western)	Won	
V Chart Awards	2017	Swift	Top Female Artist (Western)	Won	
Webby Awards	2021	"The Man"	Best Music Video	Nominated	
Webby Awards	2024	Swift and Vote.org	Best Creator or Influencer Collaboration, Features (Social)	Won	
Weibo Starlight Awards	2019	Swift	Most Influential Musician (Western)	Won	
Weibo Starlight Awards	2021	Swift	Kings of Stars	Won	
Weibo Starlight Awards	2021	Swift	Western Hall of Fame Award	Won	
World Music Awards	2010	Swift	World's Best Pop/Rock Artist	Nominated	
World Music Awards	2010	Fearless	World's Best Album	Nominated	
World Music Awards	2012	Red	World's Best Album	Nominated	
World Music Awards	2012	"We Are Never Ever Getting Back Together"	World's Best Song	Nominated	
World Music Awards	2012	"We Are Never Ever Getting Back Together"	World's Best Video	Nominated	
World Music Awards	2012	Swift	World's Best Female Artist	Nominated	
World Music Awards	2012	Swift	World's Best Live Act	Nominated	
World Music Awards	2012	Swift	World's Best Entertainer of the Year	Nominated	
Young Hollywood Awards	2008	Swift	Superstar of Tomorrow	Won	
YouTube Music Awards	2013	Swift	Artist of the Year	Nominated	
YouTube Music Awards	2013	"I Knew You Were Trouble"	Response of the Year	Nominated	
YouTube Music Awards	2013	"I Knew You Were Trouble"	YouTube Phenomenon	Won	
YouTube Music Awards	2015	Swift	50 Artists to Watch	Won	
Žebřík Music Awards	2023	Swift	Foreign Female Artist of the Year	Won	

== Other accolades ==
=== Guinness World Records ===
As of December 2024, Swift has acquired 80 Guinness World Records.

Key
†	Indicates a former world-record holder

Year the record was awarded, title of the record, and the record holder
Year	Record	Record holder	Ref.
2008	Most Entries in the US Top-20 in a Year by a Solo Artist (Note: In 2008, Swift had six tracks enter the top 20 of the Billboard Hot 100: "Change", "Love Story", "Fearless", "You're Not Sorry", "You Belong with Me" and "White Horse".)	Swift	
2009	Most Simultaneous Top-20 Entries on U.S. Digital chart (Note: On November 14, 2009, Swift became the first act to place five tracks ("Jump Then Fall", "Untouchable", "Other Side of the Door", "Superstar" and "Come in with the Rain") inside the top 20 of Billboard Digital Song Sales chart at the same time.)	Swift	
2009	Youngest Country Entertainer of the Year (Note: 19 years old)	Swift	
2010	† Youngest Album of the Year winner at the Grammy Awards (Note: Swift was 20 years old when she first won the award in 2010 for her second studio album, Fearless. Billie Eilish surpassed this record in 2020, winning the award for When We All Fall Asleep, Where Do We Go?, when she was 18 years old.)	Swift	
2010	† Youngest Solo Artist to win Album of the Year at the Grammy Awards	Swift	
2010	Fastest-Selling US Digital Download by a Female (Note: In the week ending February 6, 2010, "Today Was A Fairytale" topped the Billboard Digital Song Sales chart and sold a record 325,000 digital downloads in the U.S.)	"Today Was a Fairytale"	
2010	Fastest Selling Digital Album by a Female Artist (Note: For the week ending November 13, 2010, Swift's third studio album, Speak Now, sold 278,000 digital downloads in the U.S.)	Speak Now	
2010	† Fastest-Selling Album in the U.S. by a Female Country Artist (Note: In the week ending November 13, 2010, Speak Now shifted 1,047,000 copies, accounting for a record 18% of all album sales in the U.S. that week. Red suppressed it in November 2012 with over 1.2 million copies.)	Speak Now	
2010	† Most Simultaneous US Hot 100 Hits by A Female (Note: In November 2010, Swift had a record 11 tracks from Speak Now charting on the Billboard Hot 100 at the same time. This record was broken by many women before Swift regained the record with the 18 tracks of her seventh album, Lover, in 2019. In 2021, 26 tracks from her second re-recorded album, Red (Taylor's Version), simultaneously debuted on the Hot 100, marking the first time an artist charted so many Hot 100 entries in a single week.)	Swift	
2010	First Artist to Have Singles Enter the Top 10 of the U.S. Hot 100 in Successive Weeks (Note: Swift became the first artist to have two singles debut in the top 10 of the Hot 100 in successive weeks, with "Speak Now" on October 23, 2010, and "Back To December" on October 30, 2010.)	Swift	
2010	First Artist in U.S. Chart History to Have Seven Singles Debut in the Top 10 of the Hot 100 (Note: Swift is the first artist to have seven of her singles debut inside the Hot 100 top 10, breaking the record of five singles set by Mariah Carey in 1998. Swift did it with "Change"(2008), Fearless" (2008), "Jump Then Fall" (2009), "Today Was a Fairytale" (2010), Mine" (2010), "Speak Now" (2010) and "Back To December" (2010).)	Swift	
2012	First Solo Female with Two Million-Selling Weeks on the U.S. Albums Chart (Note: Achieved with Speak Now (2010) and Red (2012))	Swift	
2012	Fastest Selling Single in Digital History (Note: On August 14, 2012, "We Are Never Ever Getting Back Together" topped the iTunes singles chart in just 50 minutes after release.)	"We Are Never Ever Getting Back Together"	
2012	Fastest Selling Album in the US by a Country Artist (Note: Red sold 1.208 million copies in a week, ousting Garth Brooks' Double Live (1.085 million on December 5, 1998).)	Red	
2012	Fastest Selling Album in the US by a Female Country Artist	Red	
2014	Most Million-Selling Weeks on the US Albums Chart with Three Consecutive Albums (Note: The albums Speak Now (2010), Red (2012), and 1989 (2014), each sold more than a million copies within one week each.)	Swift	
2015	Most Teen Choice Awards won by an Individual (Note: Swift had won 24 Teen Choice Awards as of August 16, 2015; 22 of those as a musician and two as an actress. She extended the record with 26 as of September 2023)	Swift	
2015	Most Teen Choice Awards won by a Female	Swift	
2015	Most Teen Choice Awards won by a Musician	Swift	
2015	Most Teen Choice Awards won by a Female Musician	Swift	
2015	† Most Million-Selling Weeks on US Albums Charts (Note: Swift achieved it with Speak Now (2010), Red (2012), and 1989 (2014), and extended the record in 2017 with her sixth studio album, Reputation, and in 2022 with her tenth studio album, Midnights.)	Swift	
2015	Highest Earning Couple in Hollywood (2015) (Note: Swift and her ex-boyfriend Calvin Harris earned a combined $146 million from June 2014 to June 2015; Swift earned $80 million and Harris $66 million.)	Swift	
2016	Highest Annual Earnings for a Musician (2016) (Note: She earned an estimated $170 million in the 12 months leading up to June 1, 2016, according to Forbes.)	Swift	
2016	Highest Annual Earnings for a Female Musician Ever (Note: According to Forbes, Swift earned an estimated $170 million in the 12 months leading up to June 1, 2016, beating Katy Perry's earnings of 2014–15 by $35 million. Swift earned $185 million between June 1, 2018, and June 1, 2019, surpassing her own record.)	Swift	
2017	† Most Viewed Music Video Online (Female Artist) (Note: Had 2,110,214,601 views on May 11, 2017; surpassed by Katy Perry's "Roar" (2013).)	"Shake It Off"	
2017	Most Million-Selling Weeks on US Albums Charts	Swift	
2018	Most Streamed Track in One Week (Female) (Note: "Look What You Made Me Do" collected 84.4 million streams in its first week.)	"Look What You Made Me Do"	
2018	† Most Watched Video Online in 24 Hours (Note: The music video was watched 43.2 millions times in its first day on YouTube. Swift's "Me!" regained this record in 2019, after which it was broken again on multiple occasions.)	"Look What You Made Me Do"	
2018	† Most Streamed Track on Spotify in the First 24 Hours (Note: 8 million streams in its first 24 hours on Spotify; this record has been surpassed multiple times since then.)	"Look What You Made Me Do"	
2018	† Most Watched Vevo video in 24 Hours (Note: "Look What You Made Me do" music video was watched 43.2 million times in its first day on YouTube. American singer Ariana Grande's "Thank U, Next" (2018) surpassed it with 55.4 million views, before Swift broke the record again with 65.2 million views of "Me!" (2019).)	"Look What You Made Me Do"	
2018	Highest Grossing Music Tour by a Female Artist (2018) (Note: Amassed $345.7 million in 2018, according to Billboard.)	Reputation Stadium Tour	
2019	Most Viewed Vevo video in 24 hours	"Me!"	
2019	† Most Views of a New Music Video from a Solo Artist in 24 hours on YouTube (Note: The music video for "Lalisa" (2021), the solo debut single of Thai rapper Lisa, broke the record on September 14, 2021.)	"Me!"	
2019	Highest Climber on the US Singles Chart (Note: "Me!" ascended 98 spots from number 100 to 2 on the Hot 100 chart dated May 11, 2019.)	Swift	
2019	Highest Annual Earnings for a Female Musician Ever	Swift	
2019	Highest Annual Earnings for a Musician (2019) (Note: She earned an estimated $185 million between June 1, 2018, and June 1, 2019, according to Forbes.)	Swift	
2019	Highest Annual Earnings for a Musician (Female, 2019)	Swift	
2019	Highest-Earning Living Celebrity (2019)	Swift	
2019	Highest-Earning Living Celebrity (Female, 2019)	Swift	
2019	† Most Weeks at No.1 on the Billboard Artist 100 Chart (Note: 36 weeks, as of June 22, 2019. Increased to 51 weeks, as of November 5, 2022, and to 80, as of October 7, 2022)	Swift	
2019	† Most American Music Awards Won by a Female Artist (Note: Swift first acquired the record with 29 American Music Awards as of November 24, 2019; surpassed herself with a record of 34, as of November 21, 2021; and the current record of 40, as of November 20, 2022.)	Swift	
2019	† Most American Music Awards won	Swift	
2019	† Most Simultaneous US Hot 100 Entries by a Female	Swift	
2019	Most Global Recording Artist of the Year (IFPI) awards won (Note: Twice; 2014 and 2019.)	Swift	
2019	Biggest-Selling Album Worldwide For A Solo Artist (2019) (Note: IFPI reported Lover was 2019's biggest-selling album by a solo artist, selling 3.2 million copies globally.)	Lover	
2020	† Most Day-One Streams of An Album On Spotify (Female) (Note: Folklore garnered 80.6 million streams on July 24, 2020, breaking the record set by Ariana Grande's Thank U, Next in 2019. Swift's own Red (Taylor's Version) later surpassed Folklore with 90.8 million streams. Her tenth studio album, Midnights, subsequently broke the overall all-gender record with 184.6 million streams on October 21, 2022.)	Folklore	
2020	Most Cumulative Weeks at No.1 on US Albums Chart by a Solo Female (Note: 47 weeks, as of October 3, 2020.)	Swift	
2020	Shortest Gap Between New No.1 Albums on the US Billboard 200 (Female) (Note: Evermore topped the chart 140 days after Folklore did.)	Swift	
2021	† Most No.1s on the US Digital Song Sales chart (Note: 26, as of June 10, 2023. Swift first achieved the record on March 20, 2021, with 22 number-ones, which was updated to 24 on November 5, 2022; Her first chart-topper was "Today Was a Fairytale" (2010), and "Hits Different" (2022) the latest.)	Swift	
2021	Most Album of the Year awards won at the Grammys by a vocalist (Note: Three, tied with Frank Sinatra, Stevie Wonder, and Paul Simon; Swift won the award for Fearless, 1989, and Folklore, in 2010, 2016, and 2021, respectively.)	Swift	
2021	Most Album of the Year awards won at the Grammys (Female)	Swift	
2021	First female Brits Global Icon Award winner	Swift	
2021	Youngest Brits Global Icon Award winner (Note: 31 years and 149 days old when she received it.)	Swift	
2021	Highest Climb to No.1 on the US Albums Chart (Female) (Note: Fearless (Taylor's Version) ascended 156 spots on the chart dated October 16, 2022.)	Swift	
2021	† Most Day-one Streams of an Album on Spotify (Female)	Red (Taylor's Version)	
2021	† Most Streamed Act on Spotify in 24 Hours (Female) (Note: Swift received 122.9 million streams on November 12, 2021, but subsequently achieved the overall record, receiving 228 million streams on October 21, 2022.)	Swift	
2021	Most Simultaneous US Hot 100 New Entries (Note: 26 new entries on the chart dated November 27, 2021.)	Swift	
2021	Most Simultaneous US Hot 100 New Entries by a Solo Act	Swift	
2021	Most Simultaneous US Hot 100 Entries by a Female	Swift	
2021	Most No.1 Albums on the US Billboard 200 in a Calendar Year (Female) (Note: Evermore (January 2, January 16 and June 12), Fearless (Taylor’s Version) (April 24 and October 16), and Red (Taylor’s Version) (November 27) in 2021.)	Swift	
2021	† Most American Music Awards won	Swift	
2021	† Most American Music Awards won by a Female Artist	Swift	
2021	Longest Song to Reach No. 1 on the Billboard Hot 100	"All Too Well (10 Minute Version)"	
2022	Highest Annual Earnings for a Female Musician (2021) (Note: US$80,000,000 earned in 2021)	Swift	
2022	Most Nickelodeon Kids' Choice Awards nominations for an Individual (Note: 35 nominations as of 2022)	Swift	
2022	Most Teen Choice Awards won by an Individual	Swift	
2022	Most Teen Choice Awards won by a Musician	Swift	
2022	Most Streamed Act on Spotify in 24 hours	Swift	
2022	Most Day-one Streams of an Album on Spotify	Midnights	
2022	Most Streamed Album on Spotify in 24 hours	Midnights	
2022	Most Streamed Album on Spotify in One Week (Note: 776,481,256 streams in the week ending October 27, 2022.)	Midnights	
2022	Most Day-one Streams of an Album on Spotify (Female)	Midnights	
2022	Most Streamed Album by a Female Artist in One Week (US) (Note: 549,260,000 streams)	Midnights	
2022	Fastest-Selling Vinyl Album (US) (Note: 575,000 vinyl LPs sold in one week, surpassing Harry Styles' Harry's House, while sold 182,000 vinyl LPs in one week in 2022.)	Midnights	
2022	Most Streamed Album on Amazon Music in 24 Hours	Midnights	
2022	Most Albums with Million-Selling Weeks on the US Billboard 200	Swift	
2022	Most Million-Selling Weeks on the US Albums chart	Swift	
2022	† Most Cumulative Weeks at No.1 on US Albums chart (Solo Female) (Note: 56, as of November 5, 2022; 63 weeks, as of July 29, 2023.)	Swift	
2022	Most No.1s on Billboard Streaming Songs chart (female) (Note: Six, including the latest "Anti-Hero".)	Swift	
2022	Most Songs to Debut at No.1 on the Billboard Hot 100 (Female) (Note: Five, a tie with Ariana Grande)	Swift	
2022	†Most Top 10 Hits on the US Hot 100 (female) (Note: 40, surpassing Madonna (38) in 2022; updated to 42 in 2023.)	Swift	
2022	First Act to Debut at Positions 1–10 Simultaneously on the US Hot 100 (Note: 10 tracks from Midnights.)	Swift	
2022	First Act to Debut at Positions 1–10 Simultaneously on the US Digital Song Sales chart	Swift	
2022	Most Simultaneous Top 20 entries on the US Digital Songs Sales chart (Note: 11 tracks from Midnights.)	Swift	
2022	Most US No.1 Albums by a Female Artist (Note: 11 in 2022, tying with Barbra Streisand, and broke the tie when it became 12 in 2023.)	Swift	
2022	Most Consecutive No.1 Studio Albums on the US Billboard 200	Swift	
2022	Most Debuts at No.1 on the US Albums Chart (Female)	Swift	
2022	Most Simultaneous No.1 debuts on the US Billboard 200 and Hot 100 (Note: 4 times; Folklore and "Cardigan, Evermore and "Willow", Red (Taylor's Version) and "All Too Well (Taylor's Version)", and Midnights and "Anti-Hero".)	Swift	
2022	† Most No.1s on the US Digital Songs Sales chart	Swift	
2022	† Most Weeks at No.1 on the Billboard Artist 100 Chart	Swift	
2022	Most Simultaneous Top 10 Hits on ARIA Singles Chart (Note: Nine tracks from Midnights)	Swift	
2022	† Most Streamed Female Act on Spotify (Note: Swift, surpassing Ariana Grande, achieved the record with 35 billion streams as of November 2022, and extended the record to 41 billion streams as of February 2023.)	Swift	
2022	First Act to Debut at Positions 1–5 Simultaneously on Billboard Global 200 chart (Note: "Anti-Hero" (No.1), "Lavender Haze" (No.2), "Snow on the Beach" (No.3), "Maroon" (No.4) and "Midnight Rain" (No.5); all from Midnights)	Swift	
2022	Most American Music Awards won	Swift	
2022	Most American Music Awards won by a Female Artist	Swift	
2023	Most Simultaneous Albums on the US Billboard 200 (Living Artist) (Note: 10 albums on charts dated March 4 and May 6, 2023.)	Swift	
2023	Most Simultaneous Albums on the US Billboard 200 (Female)	Swift	
2023	Most Streamed Female Act on Spotify	Swift	
2023	Most Monthly Listeners on Spotify (Female) (Note: Over 100 million on August 29, 2023)	Swift	
2023	Most Top 10 hits on the US Hot 100 (Female)	Swift	
2023	Most US singles chart entries (Female) (Note: 212 as of July 22, 2023.)	Swift	
2023	Most US No.1 albums by a female artist	Swift	
2023	Most Cumulative Weeks at No.1 on US albums chart (Solo Female)	Swift	
2023	Most No.1s on the US Digital Song Sales chart	Swift	
2023	Greatest Seismic Activity caused by a Music concert	Swift	
2023	Most Weeks at No.1 on Billboard's Artist 100 chart	Swift	
2023	Most Grammy nominations for Song of the Year (Note: Seven, as of 2023.)	Swift	
2023	Highest-grossing Concert or Performance film at the Global Box office (Note: US$246,365,022)	Taylor Swift: The Eras Tour	
2023	Highest-grossing Music Tour (Note: $1.039 billion, as of November 2023.)	The Eras Tour	
2023	Highest-grossing Music Tour by a Female Artist	The Eras Tour	
2023	Highest-grossing Music Tour in a Single Year	The Eras Tour	
2023	Highest-grossing Music Tour by a Female Artist (2023)	The Eras Tour	
2023	Highest-grossing Music Tour by a Solo Artist	The Eras Tour	
2023	Highest-grossing Music Tour Per Concert by a Female Artist	The Eras Tour	
2023	Most Time Person of the Year Titles (Female)	Swift	
2025	Most concurrent views for a podcast on YouTube (Note: 1.3 million, for her appearance on New Heights)	Swift	

=== Listicles ===
Name of publisher, name of listicle, year(s) listed, and placement result
Publisher	Listicle	Year(s)	Result	Ref.
ABC	Barbara Walters' 10 Most Fascinating People	2014	Placed	
Apple Music	100 Best Albums	2024	18th (1989 (Taylor's Version))	
Billboard	Power 100	2024	1st	
Billboard	Music's Top Global Money Makers	2014	15th	
Billboard	Music's Top Global Money Makers	2015, 2018, 2021	1st	
Billboard	Music's Top Global Money Makers	2017	48th	
Billboard	Music's Top Global Money Makers	2020	2nd	
Billboard	The Greatest Pop Stars By Year	2015, 2021, 2023	1st	
Billboard	The Greatest Pop Stars By Year	2022	3rd	
Billboard	The Greatest Pop Stars By Year	2009, 2012, 2017, 2020	Honorable Mention	
Billboard	The 100 Greatest Music Video Artists of All Time	2020	29th	
Billboard	Top 50 Breakup Songs of All Time	2022	1st ("All Too Well")	
Billboard	The 500 Best Pop Songs	2023	42nd ("You Belong with Me"); 161st ("Blank Space")	
Billboard	Greatest Pop Stars of the 21st Century	2024	2nd	
Billboard	Top Artists of the 21st Century	2025	1st	
Bloomberg	Bloomberg 50	2018	Placed	
Brandwatch	Most Influential People on Twitter	2018–2019	1st	
Brandwatch	Most Influential People on Twitter	2020	3rd	
Brandwatch	Most Influential People on Twitter	2021	1st	
Brandwatch	Most Influential People on Twitter	2022	2nd	
Bustle	These 10 GOATS Are Paving The Way In Their Respective Fields	2021	5th	
Cleveland.com	Greatest Artist of All Time in Every Music Genre: The Definitive List	2019	Runner-up (Pop)	
CNN	The 10 Artists Who Transformed Music in the 2010s	2019	Placed	
Consequence	The 100 Greatest Albums of All Time	2022	39th (1989)	
Consequence	Artist of the Year	2023	Placed	
Entertainment Weekly	Entertainers of the Year	2019–2020, 2023	Placed	
Elle Canada	100 Women That Are Changing the World	2022	Placed	
Forbes	30 Under 30 (named to "All-Star Alumni" in 2017)	2012–2014	Placed	
Forbes	World's Highest-Paid Women in Music (including first-placements in 2016 and 2019)	2011–2020	Placed	
Forbes	Most Powerful Women	2015	64th	
Forbes	Most Powerful Women	2019	71st	
Forbes	Most Powerful Women	2020	82nd	
Forbes	Most Powerful Women	2021	78th	
Forbes	Most Powerful Women	2022	79th	
Forbes	Most Powerful Women	2023	5th	
Forbes	Most Powerful Women	2024	23rd	
Forbes	Most Powerful Women	2025	21st	
Forbes	Celebrity 100 (including first-placements in 2016 and 2019)	2011–2020	Placed	
Forbes	The World's Highest-Paid Entertainers	2019	1st	
Forbes	The World's Highest-Paid Entertainers	2022	9th	
Forbes	America's Richest Self-Made Women	2016–2023	Placed	
Forbes	Top-Earning Musicians of the Decade	2019	2nd	
Forbes	Forbes 250: America's Greatest Innovators	2026	250th	
Forbes	Iconoclast 50	2026	Placed	
Financial Times	Most Influential Women	2020	Placed	
Fortune	40 Under 40	2015	6th	
Fortune	Most Powerful Women	2015	51st	
Fortune	World's Greatest Leaders	2015	6th	
Google	Most-Searched-For Women in Music	2019	1st	
The Hollywood Reporter	Women in Entertainment Power 100	2022–2024	Placed	
The Hollywood Reporter	25 Platinum Players in Music	2023	Placed	
iHeartRadio Canada	Icons of the Decade	2019	Placed	
The Independent	50 women who broke barriers in the music industry	2020	Placed	
Insider	The 20 top artists of the decade	2019	Placed	
Insider	25 Most Iconic Breaking Songs in Music History	2022	Placed	
Jaxsta	The Jaxsta Honors List: Producers	2022	6th	
Jaxsta	The Jaxsta Honors List: Producers	2023	4th	
Lebanon Daily News	Women of the Century Pennsylvania	2020	Placed	
MarketWatch	MarketWatch 50	2023	Placed	
Maxim	Maxim Hot 100 (under "Icons & Megastars")	2023	Placed	
The New York Times	The 30 Greatest Living American Songwriters	2026	Placed	
Paste	The 300 Greatest Albums of All Time	2024	171st (Red)	
People	People of the Year	2019	Placed	
People	15 Women Changing the Music Industry Today	2022	Placed	
People	Most Intriguing People of the Year	2023	1st	
Pitchfork	The 200 Most Important Artists of Pitchfork's First 25 Years (under "The Icons")	2021	Placed	
The Post	The 8 Most Influential Musicians of the 2010s	2019	Placed	
Rolling Stone	100 Greatest Songwriters of All Time (youngest listed)	2015	97th	
Rolling Stone	100 Greatest Country Artists of All Time	2017	80th	
Rolling Stone	500 Greatest Albums of All Time	2020	99th (Red); 170th (Folklore); 393rd (1989)	
Rolling Stone	100 Greatest Music Videos of All Time	2021	67th ("Blank Space")	
Rolling Stone	500 Greatest Songs of All Time	2021	69th ("All Too Well"); 357th ("Blank Space"); 400th ("Cruel Summer")	
Rolling Stone	30 Greatest Grammy Performances of All Time	2021	4th ("Cardigan" / "August" / "Willow")	
Rolling Stone	Highest-Paid Musicians of 2021	2021	10th	
Rolling Stone	Best Summer Songs of All Time	2022	37th ("Cruel Summer")	
Rolling Stone	200 Greatest Singers of All Time	2023	102nd	
Rolling Stone	100 Greatest Country Albums of All Time	2023	10th (Fearless)	
Rolling Stone	200 Greatest Country Songs of All Time	2024	20th ("Mean"); 126th ("Tim McGraw")	
Rolling Stone	The 250 Greatest Albums of the 21st Century So Far	2025	5th (Folklore); 36th (Red); 72nd (1989); 196th (Speak Now)	
The Sunday Times	21 best songs of the 21st century	2022	16th ("Blank Space")	
The Sunday Times	Ranked: the best 20 solo singers of this century	2023	14th	
Time	Time 100	2010	Placed	
Time	Time 100	2015	Placed	
Time	Time 100	2019	Placed	
Time	Time Person of the Year	2017	Placed (as part of "Silence Breakers")	
Time	Time Person of the Year	2023	Placed	
The Telegraph	The 60 greatest female singer-songwriters of all time	2018	16th	
Tumblr	Tumblr's Artist of the Year	2022	Placed	
Variety	Variety500: The 500 Most Important People in Global Media	2017–2022	Placed	
Variety	Hollywood's New Leaders (under "Creative")	2014	Placed	
VH1	VH1's 100 Greatest Women In Music	2012	43rd	
Wired	The 10 Best Artists of the 2010s	2019	Placed	
YouGov	Most-Admired Women	2019	10th	
YouGov	Most-Admired Women	2020	9th	
YouGov	Most-Admired Women	2021	7th	

=== Honorary degree ===
Name of school, year given, and name of degree
School	Year	Degree	Ref.
New York University	2022	Doctorate of Fine Arts (D.F.A.)	
