= People's Choice Award for Favorite Country Artist =

Pop culture award

People Choice Awards for Favorite Country Artist
- Country: America
- Presented by: People Choice Awards
- First award: 2010
- Currently held by: Taylor Swift

Highlights
- Most wins: Taylor Swift (4)

The People Choice Awards for Favorite Country Artist has been awarded since 2010.The category was split by Favorite Male Country Artist, Favorite Female Country Artist and Favorite Country Group in 2015. The all-time winner in this category is Taylor Swift with 4 wins.

== Winners and nominees ==
Year	Recipient	Nominees
2014	Taylor Swift	Lady Antebellum; Carrie Underwood; Blake Shelton; The Band Perry
2013	Taylor Swift	Tim McGraw; Blake Shelton; Carrie Underwood; Jason Aldean
2012	Taylor Swift	Blake Shelton; Rascal Flatts; Lady Antebellum; Keith Urban
2011	Taylor Swift	Keith Urban; Carrie Underwood; Lady Antebellum; Rascal Flatts
2010	Carrie Underwood	Brad Paisley; Keith Urban; Taylor Swift; Rascal Flatts
