= List of Taylor Swift live performances =

Live shows by American singer-songwriter

Taylor Swift live performances
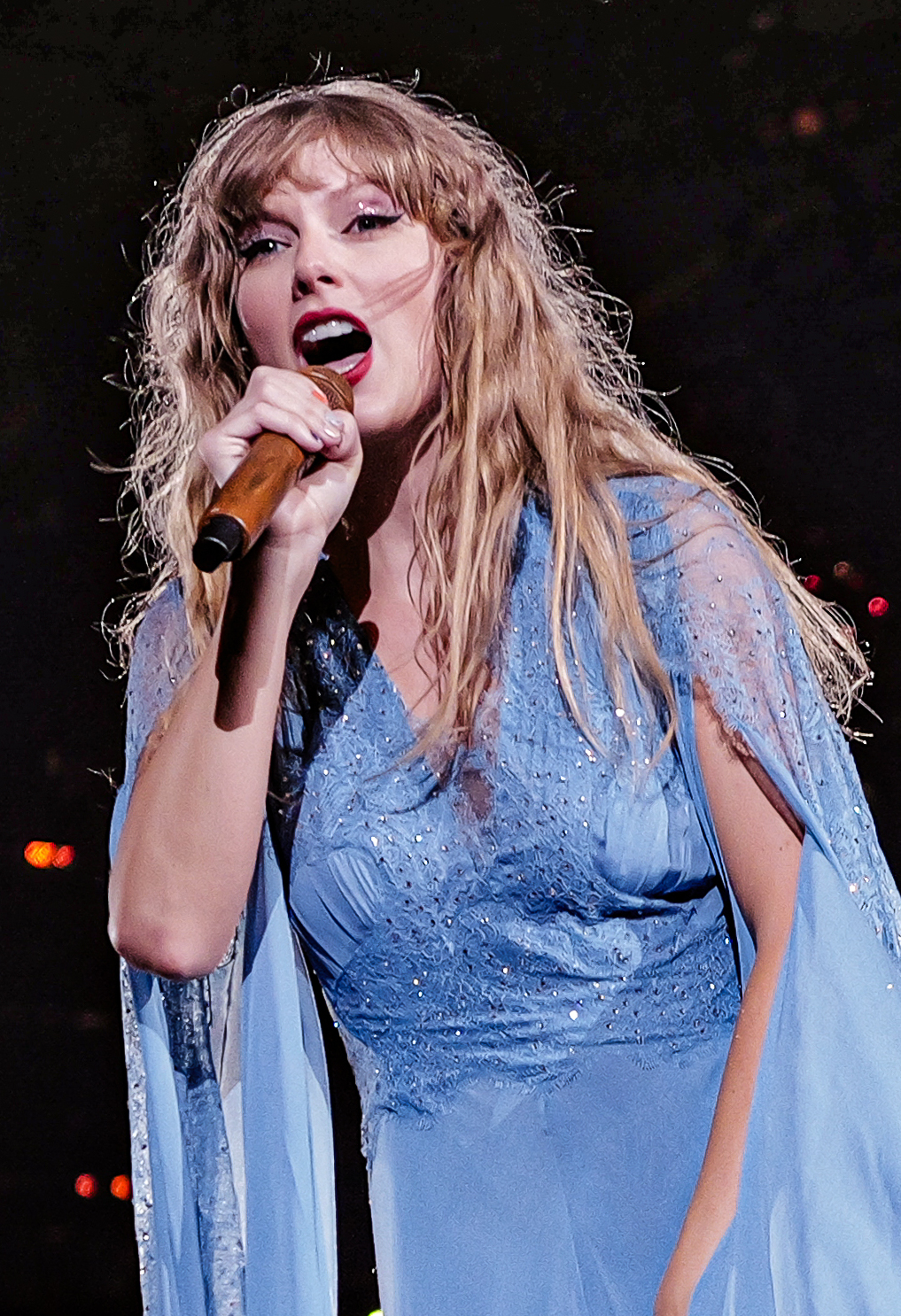
- Swift on the Eras Tour in 2023
- Concert tours: 6
- Festivals: 40
- Award shows: 50
- TV shows and specials: 95
- Radio shows and specials: 12
- Benefit concerts: 21
- Sporting events: 10
- Other live performances: 40

The American singer-songwriter Taylor Swift has headlined six concert tours to support her albums. She has additionally performed at festivals, awards shows, benefit concerts, and sporting events, as well as on TV and radio.

Before officially starting her music career, Swift performed the national anthem of the United States, "The Star-Spangled Banner", at various sporting events. After the release of her debut studio album, Taylor Swift (2006), she toured as an opening act for the country musicians Rascal Flatts, George Strait, Brad Paisley, Tim McGraw, and Faith Hill. In spring 2009, she promoted her second studio album, Fearless (2008), by headlining several festivals in the United States and a promotional tour in Australia. Her first headlining concert tour, the Fearless Tour, ran in 2009–2010; it visited six countries and grossed over $66 million from 118 shows. She also headlined festivals outside North America, including the V Festival in the United Kingdom and the Summer Sonic Festival in Japan.

Swift promoted her third studio album, Speak Now (2010), with televised performances in the United States, Japan, Italy, France, and the United Kingdom. The Speak Now World Tour followed in 2011–2012, covering 110 shows and visiting 18 territories across Asia, Europe, North America, and Oceania. It was the highest-grossing tour by a female artist and by a solo artist in 2011 and grossed $123 million. Her fourth and fifth studio albums, Red (2012) and 1989 (2014), were both promoted with numerous television and award-show performances. The Red Tour, which ran in 2013–2014, became the highest-grossing country tour after its completion with $150 million grossed from 86 shows in 12 countries and was her last headlining tour as a country artist. 1989, the album that transformed Swift's status from a country musician to a pop star, was supported by the 1989 World Tour (2015); it encompassed 85 dates in 11 countries and was the highest-grossing tour of 2015 with $250 million.

Swift's sixth studio album, Reputation (2017), was supported by the Reputation Stadium Tour (2018), which was her first all-stadium tour—its North American leg grossed $202.3 million and set the record for the highest-grossing North American tour of all time, breaking the previous record held by the 1989 World Tour. The Reputation Stadium Tour was 2018's highest-grossing tour by a female artist, accumulating $345.7 million. Swift promoted Lover (2019) with numerous television and awards show performances. From March 2023 to December 2024, Swift embarked on the Eras Tour, which supported all of the albums in her discography. Covering 149 dates and spanning five continents, it is the first concert tour in history to surpass $1 billion in revenue, grossing $2 billion and attracting 10 million in attendance.

== Concert tours ==
=== Headlining ===
List of concert tours, showing dates, associated album(s), number of shows, and relevant statistics
Title	Dates	Associated album(s)	Countries/Territories	Shows	Attendance	Gross	Adjusted gross (in 2025 dollar)	Ref.
Fearless Tour	April 23, 2009 – July 10, 2010	Fearless	United States; Canada; England; Australia; Japan; The Bahamas	118	1,200,000	$66,500,000	$98,182,130	
Speak Now World Tour	February 9, 2011 – March 18, 2012	Speak Now	United States; Canada; Australia; New Zealand; Singapore; Japan; South Korea; Philippines; Hong Kong; Belgium; Norway; Germany; Netherlands; Italy; France; Spain; England; Ireland; Northern Ireland	110	1,640,000	$123,700,000	$173,474,054	
The Red Tour	March 13, 2013 – June 12, 2014	Red	United States; Canada; New Zealand; Australia; United Kingdom; Germany; China; Japan; Indonesia; Philippines; Singapore; Malaysia	86	1,700,000	$150,200,000	$204,271,155	
The 1989 World Tour	May 5, 2015 – December 12, 2015	1989	Japan; United States; Germany; Netherlands; Scotland; England; Ireland; Canada; Singapore; China; Australia	85	2,280,000	$250,700,000	$340,519,795	
Reputation Stadium Tour	May 8, 2018 – November 21, 2018	Reputation	United States; England; Ireland; Canada; Australia; New Zealand; Japan	53	2,939,000	$345,700,000	$443,234,495	
The Eras Tour	March 17, 2023 – December 8, 2024	Various	United States; Mexico; Argentina; Brazil; Japan; Australia; Singapore; France; Sweden; Portugal; Spain; Scotland; England; Wales; Ireland; Netherlands; Switzerland; Italy; Germany; Poland; Canada	149	10,168,008	$2,077,618,725	$2.195386759×10^{9}	

=== Promotional ===
List of promotional concert tours, showing dates and relevant information
Title	Dates	Country	Description	Ref.
Taylor Swift's first Australian tour	March 5–14, 2009	Australia	Swift's promotional concert tour in support of her second studio album, Fearless (2008), in Australia. It visited Brisbane, Melbourne, and Sydney. Morgan Evans was the opening act.	

=== As an opening act ===
List of concert tours as an opening act, showing dates and headlining artist(s)
Title	Dates	Headlining artist(s)	Country	Ref.
Me and My Gang Tour	October 19 – November 3, 2006	Rascal Flatts	United States	
George Strait's 2007 Tour	January 11 – March 3, 2007	George Strait	United States	
Bonfires and Amplifiers Tour	April 26 – November 16, 2007	Brad Paisley	United States	
Soul2Soul II Tour	July 9 – 18, 2007	Tim McGraw and Faith Hill	United States	
Bob That Head Tour	June 13 – September 26, 2008	Rascal Flatts	United States	
Escape Together World Tour	June 9 – August 8, 2009	Keith Urban	United States	

== Festivals ==
List of festival performances, showing dates, locations, and performed songs where available
Date	Event	City	Country	Performed song(s)	Ref.
October 1, 2006	I-105 Fallfest Country Music Fesetival	Lancaster	United States	Unknown	
October 7, 2006	In the Street	Frederick	United States	Unknown	
October 14, 2006	KZLA Country Bash	Irvine	United States	"Tim McGraw"	
October 21, 2006	Lexington Barbecue Festival	Lexington	United States	"Picture to Burn"; "Tim McGraw"	
July 6, 2007	Festival of the Bells	Hillsboro	United States	Unknown	
August 18, 2007	Trails West!	St. Joseph	United States	Unknown	
May 3, 2008	Stagecoach	Indio	United States	"I'm Only Me When I'm with You"; "Our Song"; "Teardrops on My Guitar"; "Should've Said No"; "A Perfectly Good Heart"; "Tim McGraw"; "Picture to Burn"	
August 9, 2008	WE Fest	Detroit Lakes	United States	"I'm Only Me When I'm with You"; "Our Song"; "Teardrops on My Guitar"; "Should've Said No"; "Tim McGraw"; "Picture to Burn"	
October 12, 2008	Chicago Country Music Festival (Note: Part of the 2008 Chicago Marathon)	Chicago	United States	"I'm Only Me When I'm with You"; "Our Song"; "Should've Said No"; "Change"; "Stay Beautiful"; "A Place in This World"	
March 1, 2009	Florida Strawberry Festival	Plant City	United States	"You Belong with Me"; "Our Song"; "Tell Me Why"; "Teardrops on My Guitar"; "Forever & Always"; "Hey Stephen"; "White Horse"; "Leavin'"; "Should've Said No"; "Fearless"; "Tim McGraw"; "Love Story"; "Change"; "Picture to Burn"	
March 7, 2009	CMC Rocks the Snowys (Note: Part of Swift's first Australian tour)	Thredbo	Australia	"You Belong with Me"; "Our Song"; "Tell Me Why"; "Teardrops on My Guitar"; "Forever & Always"; "Hey Stephen"; "White Horse"; "Leavin'"; "Should've Said No"; "Fearless"; "Tim McGraw"; "Love Story"; "Change"; "Picture to Burn"	
June 4, 2009	BamaJam (Note: Part of the Fearless Tour)	Enterprise	United States	"You Belong with Me"; "Should've Said No"	
June 14, 2009	CMA Music Festival	Nashville	United States	"Picture to Burn"; "Our Song"; "You Belong with Me"; "Fifteen"; "You're Not Sorry"; "Love Story"	
June 24, 2009	Country USA Festival	Oshkosh	United States	Unknown	
June 25, 2009	Chippewa Valley Country Fest	Cadott	United States	Unknown	
July 10, 2009	Craven Country Jamboree	Craven	Canada	"You Belong with Me"; "Our Song"; "Teardrops on My Guitar"; "Fearless"; "Forever & Always"; "Tim McGraw"; "You're Not Sorry"; "Picture to Burn"; "Love Story"	
July 16, 2009	Country Thunder Festival	Twin Lakes	United States	"Love Story"; "You Belong with Me"	
July 23, 2009	Cheyenne Frontier Days	Cheyenne	United States	Unknown	
July 25, 2009	North Dakota State Fair	Minot	United States	Unknown	
August 7, 2009	WE Fest	Detroit Lakes	United States	"You Belong with Me"; "Tim McGraw"; "White Horse"	
August 22, 2009	V Festival	Chelmsford	England	Unknown	
August 23, 2009	V Festival	Staffordshire	England	Unknown	
December 11, 2009	Z100 Jingle Ball	New York	United States	"Half of My Heart (with John Mayer); "Two Is Better Than One" (with Boys Like Girls); "You Belong with Me"; "Teardrops on My Guitar"; "Fifteen"; "Love Story"	
May 29, 2010	Bayou Country Superfest	Baton Rouge	United States	Unknown	
July 10, 2010	Cavendish Beach Music Festival	Cavendish	Canada	Unknown	
August 8, 2010	Summer Sonic Festival	Chiba	Japan	"You Belong with Me"; "Our Song"; "Teardrops on My Guitar"; "Fearless"; "Forever & Always"; "Fifteen"; "Today Was a Fairytale"; "Should've Said No"; "Love Story"; "Picture to Burn"	
June 12, 2011	CMA Music Festival	Nashville	United States	"The Story of Us"; "Our Song"; "Mean"; "Fearless" / "Hey, Soul Sister" / "I'm Yours"; "You Belong with Me"; "Love Story"	
September 21, 2012	iHeartRadio Music Festival	Las Vegas	United States	"Sparks Fly"; "You Belong with Me"; "Mean"; "Love Story"; "We Are Never Ever Getting Back Together"	
December 1, 2012	iHeartRadio Jingle Ball Tour 2012: KIIS-FM's Jingle Ball 2012	Los Angeles	United States	"State of Grace"; "I Knew You Were Trouble"; "You Belong with Me"; "Red"; "We Are Never Ever Getting Back Together"	
December 7, 2012	iHeartRadio Jingle Ball Tour 2012: Z100 Jingle's Ball 2012	New York	United States	"State of Grace"; "You Belong with Me"; "Everything Has Changed" (with Ed Sheeran); "Love Story"; "I Knew You Were Trouble"; "We Are Never Ever Getting Back Together"	
June 6, 2013	CMA Music Festival	Nashville	United States	"We Are Never Ever Getting Back Together"; "Mean"; "Love Story"; "Red"; "Highway Don't Care" (with Tim McGraw and Keith Urban)	
September 19, 2014	iHeartRadio Music Festival	Las Vegas	United States	"We Are Never Ever Getting Back Together"; "22"; "I Knew You Were Trouble"; "Love Story"; "Shake It Off"	
December 5, 2014	iHeartRadio Jingle Ball Tour 2014	Los Angeles	United States	"We Are Never Ever Getting Back Together"; "Blank Space"; "I Knew You Were Trouble"; "Love Story"; "Shake It Off"	
December 7, 2014	Capital FM's Jingle Bell Ball 2014	London	England	"We Are Never Ever Getting Back Together"; "Blank Space"; "I Knew You Were Trouble"; "Love Story"; "Shake It Off"	
December 12, 2014	iHeartRadio Jingle Ball Tour 2014: Z100 Jingle's Ball 2014	New York	United States	"Welcome to New York"; "We Are Never Ever Getting Back Together"; "Blank Space"; "I Knew You Were Trouble"; "Shake It Off"	
May 15, 2015	Rock in Rio USA	Winchester	United States	"Welcome to New York"; "New Romantics"; "Blank Space"; "I Knew You Were Trouble"; "I Wish You Would"; "How You Get the Girl"; "I Know Places"; "Tenerife Sea" (with Ed Sheeran); "Wonderland"; "Clean"; "Love Story"; "Style"; "This Love"; "Bad Blood"; "We Are Never Ever Getting Back Together"; "Wildest Dreams" / "Enchanted"; "Out of the Woods"; "Shake It Off"	
May 24, 2015	BBC Radio 1's Big Weekend	Norwich	England	"We Are Never Ever Getting Back Together"; "Blank Space"; "Style"; "I Knew You Were Trouble"; "Love Story"; "Bad Blood"; "Shake It Off"	
June 27, 2015	British Summer Time (Note: Part of the 1989 World Tour)	London	England	"Welcome to New York"; "New Romantics"; "Blank Space"; "I Knew You Were Trouble"; "I Wish You Would"; "How You Get the Girl"; "I Know Places"; "All You Had to Do Was Stay"; "You Are in Love"; "Clean"; "Love Story"; "Style"; "This Love"; "Bad Blood"; "We Are Never Ever Getting Back Together"; "Wildest Dreams" / "Enchanted"; "Out of the Woods"; "Shake It Off"	
December 1, 2017	iHeartRadio Jingle Ball Tour 2017: KIIS-FM's Jingle Ball 2017	Inglewood	United States	"...Ready for It?"; "Blank Space"; "Shake It Off"; "I Don't Wanna Live Forever"; "End Game" (with Ed Sheeran); "Look What You Made Me Do"	
December 7, 2017	B96 Chicago and Pepsi Jingle Bash 2017	Chicago	United States	"...Ready for It?"; "Blank Space"; "Shake It Off"; "I Don't Wanna Live Forever"; "Gorgeous"; "Look What You Made Me Do"	
December 8, 2017	iHeartRadio Jingle Ball Tour 2017: Z100 Jingle Ball	New York	United States	"...Ready for It?"; "Blank Space"; "Shake It Off"; "I Don't Wanna Live Forever"; "End Game" (with Ed Sheeran); "Look What You Made Me Do"	
December 10, 2017	Capital FM's Jingle Bell Ball 2017	London	England	"...Ready for It?"; "Blank Space"; "Shake It Off"; "I Don't Wanna Live Forever"; "Gorgeous"; "Look What You Made Me Do"	
May 27, 2018	BBC Music's Biggest Weekend	Swansea	Wales	"...Ready for It?"; "Gorgeous"; "Look What You Made Me Do"; "Delicate"; "Blank Space"; "Shake It Off"	
June 1, 2019	Wango Tango	Carson	United States	"Shake It Off"; "Blank Space"; "I Knew You Were Trouble"; "Love Story"; "Delicate"; "Style"; "We Are Never Ever Getting Back Together"; "Me!" (with Brendon Urie)	
December 8, 2019	Capital FM's Jingle Bell Ball 2019	London	England	"Blank Space"; "Me!"; "London Boy"; "Lover"; "We Are Never Ever Getting Back Together"; "22"; "You Need to Calm Down"; "Christmas Tree Farm"; "Shake It Off"	
December 13, 2019	Z100's iHeartRadio Jingle Ball 2019	New York	United States	"Blank Space"; "Me!"; "Lover"; "Welcome to New York"; "You Need to Calm Down"; "Christmas Tree Farm"; "Shake It Off"	

== Award shows ==
List of awards show performances, showing event names, dates, locations, and performed songs
Date	Event	City	Country	Performed song(s)	Ref.
May 15, 2007	42nd Academy of Country Music Awards	Las Vegas	United States	"Tim McGraw"	
November 7, 2007	2007 Country Music Association Awards	Nashville	United States	"Our Song"	
April 14, 2008	2008 CMT Music Awards	Nashville	United States	"Picture to Burn"	
May 18, 2008	43rd Academy of Country Music Awards	Las Vegas	United States	"Should've Said No"	
November 12, 2008	2008 Country Music Association Awards	Nashville	United States	"Love Story"	
November 23, 2008	2008 American Music Awards	Los Angeles	United States	"White Horse"	
February 8, 2009	51st Annual Grammy Awards	Los Angeles	United States	"Fifteen" (with Miley Cyrus)	
April 5, 2009	44th Academy of Country Music Awards	Las Vegas	United States	"Picture to Burn" (with Brooks & Dunn); "You're Not Sorry"	
June 16, 2009	2009 CMT Music Awards	Nashville	United States	"Thug Story" (pre-recorded "Love Story" parody with T-Pain); "You Belong with Me"; "Pour Some Sugar on Me" (with Def Leppard)	
September 13, 2009	2009 MTV Video Music Awards	New York	United States	"You Belong with Me"	
November 11, 2009	2009 Country Music Association Awards	Nashville	United States	"Forever & Always"; "Fifteen"	
January 31, 2010	52nd Annual Grammy Awards	Los Angeles	United States	"Today Was a Fairytale"; "Rhiannon" (with Stevie Nicks); "You Belong with Me" (with Stevie Nicks)	
April 18, 2010	45th Academy of Country Music Awards	Las Vegas	United States	"Change"	
September 12, 2010	2010 MTV Video Music Awards	Los Angeles	United States	"Innocent"	
November 10, 2010	2010 Country Music Association Awards	Nashville	United States	"Back to December"	
November 14, 2010	2010 BBC Radio 1's Teen Awards	London	England	"Love Story"; "Speak Now"; "Mine"	
November 21, 2010	2010 American Music Awards	Los Angeles	United States	"Back to December" / "Apologize"	
April 3, 2011	46th Academy of Country Music Awards	Las Vegas	United States	"Mean"	
November 9, 2011	2011 Country Music Association Awards	Nashville	United States	"Ours"	
February 12, 2012	54th Annual Grammy Awards	Los Angeles	United States	"Mean"	
September 6, 2012	2012 MTV Video Music Awards	Los Angeles	United States	"We Are Never Ever Getting Back Together"	
October 7, 2012	2012 BBC Radio 1's Teen Awards	London	England	"You Belong with Me"; "Love Story"; "Red"; "We Are Never Ever Getting Back Together"	
November 1, 2012	2012 Country Music Association Awards	Nashville	United States	"Begin Again"	
November 11, 2012	2012 MTV Europe Music Awards	Frankfurt	Germany	"We Are Never Ever Getting Back Together"	
November 18, 2012	2012 American Music Awards	Los Angeles	United States	"I Knew You Were Trouble"	
November 29, 2012	2012 ARIA Music Awards	Sydney	Australia	"I Knew You Were Trouble"	
January 24, 2013	2012 Los Premios 40 Principales	Madrid	Spain	"We Are Never Ever Getting Back Together"	
January 26, 2013	2013 NRJ Music Awards	Cannes	France	"We Are Never Ever Getting Back Together"	
February 10, 2013	55th Annual Grammy Awards	Los Angeles	United States	"We Are Never Ever Getting Back Together"	
February 20, 2013	2013 Brit Awards	London	England	"I Knew You Were Trouble"	
April 7, 2013	48th Academy of Country Music Awards	Las Vegas	United States	"Highway Don't Care" (with Tim McGraw and Keith Urban)	
May 19, 2013	2013 Billboard Music Awards	Las Vegas	United States	"22"	
June 5, 2013	2013 CMT Music Awards	Nashville	United States	"Red"	
November 6, 2013	2013 Country Music Association Awards	Nashville	United States	"Red" (with Alison Krauss, Edgar Meyer, Eric Darken, Sam Bush, and Vince Gill)	
January 26, 2014	56th Annual Grammy Awards	Los Angeles	United States	"All Too Well"	
August 24, 2014	2014 MTV Video Music Awards	Inglewood	United States	"Shake It Off"	
September 4, 2014	2014 German Radio Awards	Marl	Germany	"Shake It Off"	
October 19, 2014	2014 BBC Radio 1's Teen Awards	London	England	"Love Story"	
November 23, 2014	2014 American Music Awards	Los Angeles	United States	"Blank Space"	
February 25, 2015	2015 Brit Awards	London	England	"Blank Space"	
March 29, 2015	2015 iHeartRadio Music Awards	Los Angeles	United States	"Ghosttown" (with Madonna)	
August 30, 2015	2015 MTV Video Music Awards	Los Angeles	United States	"The Night Is Still Young"; "Bad Blood" (both with Nicki Minaj)	
February 15, 2016	58th Annual Grammy Awards	Los Angeles	United States	"Out of the Woods"	
October 9, 2018	2018 American Music Awards	Los Angeles	United States	"I Did Something Bad"	
May 1, 2019	2019 Billboard Music Awards	Las Vegas	United States	"Me!" (with Brendon Urie of Panic! at the Disco)	
August 26, 2019	2019 MTV Video Music Awards	Newark	United States	"You Need to Calm Down"; "Lover"	
November 24, 2019	2019 American Music Awards	Los Angeles	United States	"The Man"; "Love Story"; "I Knew You Were Trouble"; "Blank Space"; "Shake It Off" (with Halsey and Camila Cabello); "Lover" (with Misty Copeland and Craig Hall)	
September 16, 2020	55th Academy of Country Music Awards	Nashville	United States	"Betty"	
March 14, 2021	63rd Annual Grammy Awards	Los Angeles	United States	"Cardigan"; "August"; "Willow" (all with Jack Antonoff and Aaron Dessner)	
September 20, 2022	2022 Nashville Songwriter Awards	Nashville	United States	"All Too Well (10 Minute Version)"	
November 18, 2026	60th Annual Country Music Association Awards	Nashville	United States	"I Knew It, I Knew You"; "Our Song"	

== TV shows and specials ==
List of TV performances, showing event names, dates, locations, and performed songs where applicable
Date	Event	City	Country	Performed song(s)	Ref.
October 24, 2006	Good Morning America	New York	United States	"Tim McGraw"	
October 24, 2006	The Megan Mullaly Show	New York	United States	"Tim McGraw"	
February 13, 2007	The Tonight Show with Jay Leno	Burbank	United States	"Tim McGraw"	
August 21, 2007	America's Got Talent	Las Vegas	United States	"Teardrops on My Guitar" (with Julienne Irwin)	
October 10, 2007	Live with Regis and Kelly	New York	United States	"Our Song"	
November 28, 2007	75th Rockefeller Center Christmas Tree Lighting	New York	United States	"Silent Night"	
December 25, 2007	The Today Show	Las Vegas	United States	"Christmases When You Were Mine"; "Silent Night"	
December 31, 2007	Dick Clark's New Year's Rockin' Eve	New York	United States	"Our Song"; "Teardrops on My Guitar"	
January 17, 2008	The Ellen DeGeneres Show	Burbank	United States	"Our Song"	
April 29, 2008	Good Morning America	New York	United States	"Our Song"; "Picture to Burn"	
April 30, 2008	Live with Regis and Kelly	New York	United States	"Picture to Burn"	
November 7, 2008 (Note: This is the broadcast day. The performance took place and was recorded on October 6, 2008.)	CMT Crossroads: Taylor Swift and Def Leppard	Nashville	United States	"Photograph"; "Picture to Burn"; "Love Story"; "Hysteria"; "Teardrops on My Guitar"; "When Love & Hate Collide"; "Should've Said No"; "Pour Some Sugar on Me"; "Love"; "Our Song"; "Two Steps Behind" (all with Def Leppard)	
November 10, 2008	Good Morning America	New York	United States	"Love Story"	
November 10, 2008	Late Show with David Letterman	New York	United States	"Fearless"	
November 11, 2008	The Ellen DeGeneres Show	Burbank	United States	"Love Story"; "Should've Said No"	
December 5, 2008	The Tonight Show with Jay Leno	Burbank	United States	"White Horse"; "Our Song"	
December 6, 2008 (Note: This is the broadcast day. The performance took place and was recorded in November 2008.)	CMT Giants: Alan Jackson	Nashville	United States	"Drive (For Daddy Gene)"	
December 31, 2008	Dick Clark's New Year's Rockin' Eve	New York	United States	"Picture to Burn"; "Love Story"; "Forever & Always"; "Change"	
January 10, 2009	Saturday Night Live	New York	United States	"Love Story"; "Forever & Always"	
February 18, 2009	Loose Women	London	England	"Love Story"	
April 6, 2009	George Strait: ACM Artist of the Decade All Star Concert	Las Vegas	United States	"Run"	
May 5, 2009	Later... with Jools Holland	London	England	"Love Story"	
May 8, 2009	The Paul O'Grady Show	London	England	"Teardrops on My Guitar"	
May 29, 2009	The Today Show	New York	United States	"Love Story"; "You Belong with Me"; "Teardrops on My Guitar"; "Our Song"	
August 21, 2009	GMTV	London	England	"You Belong with Me"	
September 15, 2009	The View	New York	United States	"You Belong with Me"	
October 27, 2009	Dancing with the Stars	Los Angeles	United States	"Jump Then Fall"; "Love Story"	
November 7, 2009	Saturday Night Live	New York	United States	"The Monologue Song (La La La)"; "You Belong with Me"; "Untouchable"	
November 18, 2009	The Paul O'Grady Show	London	England	"Fifteen"	
February 17, 2010	Sukkiri Morning Show	Tokyo	Japan	"You Belong with Me"	
February 18, 2010	So You Think You Can Dance Australia	Sydney	Australia	"You Belong with Me"	
February 28, 2010	Music Japan Overseas	Tokyo	Japan	"You Belong with Me"	
May 23, 2010	ACM Presents: Brooks & Dunn – The Last Rodeo	Las Vegas	United States	"Ain't Nothing 'bout You"	
October 5, 2010	X Factor Italia	Milan	Italy	"Mine"	
October 19, 2010	Le Grand Journal	Cannes	France	"Mine"	
October 26, 2010	The Today Show	New York	United States	"Mine"; "Speak Now"; "Love Story"	
October 26, 2010	Late Show with David Letterman	New York	United States	"You Belong with Me"; "Back to December"; "Love Story"; "Mine"; "Speak Now"	
October 27, 2010	Live with Regis and Kelly	New York	United States	"Mine"	
November 1, 2010	The Ellen DeGeneres Show	Burbank	United States	"You Belong with Me"; "Back to December"; "Mine"	
November 2, 2010	Dancing with the Stars	Los Angeles	United States	"Mine"; "White Horse"	
November 18, 2010	Zoom In	Tokyo	Japan	"Mine"	
November 19, 2010	Music Station	Tokyo	Japan	"Mine"	
November 25, 2010	NBC's Thanksgiving Special: Taylor Swift – Speak Now	Los Angeles and New York	United States	"Mine"; "Sparks Fly"; "The Story of Us"; "Long Live"; "Haunted"; "Mean"; "Back to December"; "Enchanted"; "Speak Now"	
May 11, 2011	The Ellen DeGeneres Show	Burbank	United States	"The Story of Us"	
February 21, 2012	The Ellen DeGeneres Show	Burbank	United States	"Pumped Up Kicks" (with Zac Efron)	
September 13, 2012	TV Xuxa	Rio de Janeiro	Brazil	"We Are Never Ever Getting Back Together"; "Long Live"	
October 14, 2012	The X Factor	London	England	"We Are Never Ever Getting Back Together"	
October 15, 2012	VH1 Storytellers	Claremont	United States	"You Belong with Me"; "Red"; "Ours"; "Eyes Open"; "Mean"; "Begin Again"; "We Are Never Ever Getting Back Together"; "Our Song"; "Love Story"	
October 23, 2012	The View	New York	United States	"We Are Never Ever Getting Back Together"	
October 23, 2012	Late Show with David Letterman	New York	United States	"We Are Never Ever Getting Back Together"; "Red"; "Love Story"; "Mean"; "Begin Again"; "You Belong with Me"	
October 23, 2012	Good Morning America	New York	United States	"We Are Never Ever Getting Back Together"; "Red"; "Love Story"	
October 30, 2012	Dancing with the Stars	Los Angeles	United States	"We Are Never Ever Getting Back Together"	
November 9, 2012	Skavlan	London	United Kingdom	"We Are Never Ever Getting Back Together"	
November 15, 2012	The X Factor	Los Angeles	United States	"State of Grace"	
November 20, 2012	Sukkiri Morning Show	Tokyo	Japan	"We Are Never Ever Getting Back Together"	
November 25, 2012	The Today Show	Sydney	Australia	"We Are Never Ever Getting Back Together"; "Red"; "I Knew You Were Trouble"	
December 15, 2012	Schlag den Raab	Cologne	Germany	"We Are Never Ever Getting Back Together"	
December 31, 2012	Dick Clark's New Year's Rockin' Eve	New York	United States	"I Knew You Were Trouble"; "We Are Never Ever Getting Back Together"	
January 28, 2013	Le Grand Journal	Paris	France	"We Are Never Ever Getting Back Together"	
January 28, 2013	Off Live – Taylor Swift Live On The Seine	Paris	France	"Red"; "You Belong with Me"; "22"; "I Knew You Were Trouble"; "Love Story"; "We Are Never Ever Getting Back Together"	
February 22, 2013	The Graham Norton Show	London	England	"I Knew You Were Trouble"	
March 9, 2013	Let's Dance for Comic Relief	London	England	"22"	
May 19, 2013	ACM Presents: Tim McGraw's Superstar Summer Night	Las Vegas	United States	"Highway Don't Care" (with Tim McGraw and Keith Urban)	
June 8, 2013	Britain's Got Talent	London	England	"Everything Has Changed" (with Ed Sheeran)	
July 4, 2013	Macy's 4th of July Fireworks Spectacular	New York	United States	"We Are Never Ever Getting Back Together"; "Everything Has Changed" (with Ed Sheeran)	
November 3, 2013	The X Factor	London	England	"The Last Time" (with Gary Lightbody of Snow Patrol)	
November 13, 2013	Victoria's Secret Fashion Show	New York	United States	"My Songs Know What You Did in the Dark (Light Em Up)" (with Fall Out Boy); "I Knew You Were Trouble"	
October 6, 2014	Le Grand Journal	Paris	France	"Shake It Off"	
October 7, 2014	C à vous	Paris	France	"Shake It Off"	
October 12, 2014	The X Factor	London	England	"Shake It Off"	
October 20, 2014	The X Factor	Sydney	Australia	"Shake It Off"	
October 23, 2014	Jimmy Kimmel Live!	Los Angeles	United States	"Shake It Off"; "Out of the Woods"; "I Knew You Were Trouble" (not broadcast); "We Are Never Ever Getting Back Together" (not broadcast)	
October 24, 2014	Alan Carr: Chatty Man	London	England	"Shake It Off"	
October 27, 2014	The Ellen DeGeneres Show	Burbank	United States	"Shake It Off"; "Out of the Woods"	
October 28, 2014	Late Show with David Letterman	New York	United States	"Welcome to New York"	
October 30, 2014	Good Morning America	New York	United States	"Welcome to New York"; "Out of the Woods"; "Shake It Off"	
November 5, 2014	Mezamashi TV	Tokyo	Japan	"Shake It Off"	
November 6, 2014	Sukkiri Morning Show	Tokyo	Japan	"Shake It Off"	
November 25, 2014	The Voice	New York	United States	"Blank Space"	
November 29, 2014	Songs	Tokyo	Japan	"We Are Never Ever Getting Back Together"; "Blank Space"; "Shake It Off"	
December 9, 2014	Victoria's Secret Fashion Show	London	England	"Blank Space"; "Style"	
December 31, 2014	Dick Clark's New Year's Rockin' Eve	New York	United States	"Welcome to New York"; "Shake It Off"	
February 16, 2015	Saturday Night Live 40th Anniversary Special after party	New York	United States	"I Saw Her Standing There"; "Shake It Off" (both with Paul McCartney, Jimmy Fallon, and Dan Aykroyd)	
November 9, 2017 (Note: This is the broadcast day. The performance took place and was recorded on October 18, 2017.)	ABC World Premiere Performance	Watch Hill	United States	"New Year's Day"	
November 11, 2017	Saturday Night Live	New York	United States	"...Ready for It?"; "Call It What You Want"	
November 13, 2017	The Tonight Show Starring Jimmy Fallon	New York	United States	"New Year's Day"	
May 21, 2019	The Voice	Los Angeles	United States	"Me!" (with Brendon Urie)	
May 22, 2019	Germany's Next Topmodel	Düsseldorf	Germany	"Me!"	
May 24, 2019	The Graham Norton Show	London	England	"Me!"	
May 25, 2019	The Voice	Paris	France	"Shake It Off"; "Me!"	
August 22, 2019	Good Morning America	New York	United States	"You Need to Calm Down"; "Me!"; "Shake It Off"	
October 5, 2019	Saturday Night Live	New York	United States	"Lover"; "False God"	
November 7, 2019	Sukkiri Morning Show	Tokyo	Japan	"Me!"	
December 14, 2019	Strictly Come Dancing	London	England	"Lover"	
December 18, 2019	The Tonight Show Starring Jimmy Fallon	New York	United States	"Memory" (with Jimmy Fallon, the Roots, and the cast of Cats)	
November 25, 2020 (Note: This is the broadcast day. The session took place and was recorded in September 2020.)	Folklore: The Long Pond Studio Sessions	—N/a (Note: Unknown locale in the Hudson Valley)	United States	"The 1"; "Cardigan"; "The Last Great American Dynasty"; "Exile" (with Bon Iver); "My Tears Ricochet"; "Mirrorball"; "Seven"; "August"; "This Is Me Trying"; "Illicit Affairs"; "Invisible String"; "Mad Woman"; "Epiphany"; "Betty"; "Peace"; "Hoax"; "The Lakes" (all with Jack Antonoff and Aaron Dessner)	
November 13, 2021	Saturday Night Live	New York	United States	"All Too Well (10 Minute Version)"	

== Radio shows and specials ==
List of radio performances, showing dates, locations, and performed song(s)
Date	Event	City	Country	Performed song(s)	Ref.
September 1, 2006	Grand Ole Opry	Nashville	United States	"Tim McGraw"	
June 19, 2007	WGAR-FM's Afternoon Saloon	Cleveland	United States	"Our Song"; "Permanent Marker"; "Teardrops on My Guitar"; "Fearless"; "Should've Said No"; "Stay Beautiful"; "Tim McGraw"; "Picture to Burn"	
October 20, 2010	BBC Radio 2	London	England	"Viva la Vida"; "Mine"	
April 5, 2011	Live Lounge	London	England	"The Story of Us"; "White Blank Page"	
November 27, 2012	2Day FM	Sydney	Australia	"Red"; "I Knew You Were Trouble"; "We Are Never Ever Getting Back Together"	
October 9, 2014	Live Lounge	London	England	"Shake It Off"; "Love Story"; "Riptide"	
October 27, 2014	1989 Secret Session with iHeartRadio	New York	United States	"Welcome to New York"; "Shake It Off"; "Out of the Woods"; "Style"; "Blank Space"; "Shake It Off"	
December 3, 2015	Nova's Red Room	—N/a (Note: On Hamilton Island)	Australia	"Blank Space"; "Out of the Woods"; "Wildest Dreams"; "Shake It Off"	
November 10, 2017	SiriusXM Fishbowl	New York	United States	"Call It What You Want"; "New Year's Day"; "American Girl"	
August 23, 2019	SiriusXM Hits 1 Town Hall	New York	United States	"The Archer"; "You Need to Calm Down"; "Daylight"	
September 2, 2019	Live Lounge	London	England	"London Boy"; "Lover"; "Can't Stop Loving You"; "Holy Ground"; "The Archer"; "You Need to Calm Down"	

== Benefit concerts ==
List of benefit concert performances, showing event names, dates, locations, and songs performed
Date	Event/Venue	City	Country	Performed song(s)	Ref.
February 12, 2006	"What Happens Down in Mexico" party benefitting Battle Ground Academy	Franklin	United States	Unknown	
April 26, 2006	Fundraiser for the Exchange Club "The Family Centre"	Nashville	United States	Unknown	
August 15, 2006	Fundraiser for the Greater Alliance Carnation Festival	Alliance	United States	"Tim McGraw"	
November 8, 2006	WBEE Concert for the Families benefit	Henrietta	United States	Unknown	
December 8, 2006	A Benefit Christmas Concert for Toys for Tots	Santa Ynez	United States	Unknown	
May 17, 2007	Fundraiser for the St. Jude Children's Research Hospital	Woodlake	United States	"Tim McGraw"; "Teardrops on My Guitar"	
March 14, 2009	Sound Relief	Sydney	Australia	"You Belong with Me"; "Our Song"; "Love Story"; "Change"	
November 21, 2009	Children in Need	London	England	"Love Story"	
January 22, 2010	Hope for Haiti Now	Los Angeles	United States	"Breathless"	
June 22, 2010	Nashville Rising	Nashville	United States	"You Belong with Me"; "Love Story"	
September 23, 2010	All for the Hall (Note: A benefit concert for the Country Music Hall of Fame)	Los Angeles	United States	"Love Story"; "Mine"	
May 21, 2011	Speak Now... Help Now (Note: A special benefit rehearsal show of the Speak Now World Tour)	Nashville	United States	"Mine"; "The Story of Us"	
September 7, 2012	Stand Up to Cancer	Los Angeles	United States	"Ronan"	
December 3, 2012	Robert F. Kennedy Center for Justice and Human Rights	New York	United States	"Starlight"	
November 27, 2013	Winter Whites Gala	London	England	"I Knew You Were Trouble"; "Love Story"; "Livin' on a Prayer" (with Jon Bon Jovi and Prince William)	
October 17, 2014	Stand Up to Cancer	London	England	"Bake It Off" (pre-recorded "Shake It Off" parody with Jamie Oliver)	
October 24, 2014	We Can Survive	Los Angeles	United States	"We Are Never Ever Getting Back Together"; "Out of the Woods"; "I Knew You Were Trouble"; "Shake It Off"	
May 7, 2018	University of Phoenix Stadium (Note: A special benefit rehearsal show of the Reputation Stadium Tour)	Glendale	United States	Unknown	
December 5, 2018	The Ally Coalition Talent Show	New York	United States	"Delicate" (with Hayley Kiyoko)	
October 19, 2019	We Can Survive	Los Angeles	United States	"Blank Space"; "Me!"; "Lover"; "You Need to Calm Down"; "Shake It Off"	
April 18, 2020 (Note: This is the virtual broadcast day. The performance was pre-recorded in 2020.)	One World: Together At Home	—N/a (Note: The concert was held online.)		"Soon You'll Get Better"	
June 24, 2025	Tight Ends & Friends	Nashville	United States	"Shake It Off" (with Kane Brown)	
June 23, 2026	Tight Ends & Friends	Nashville	United States	"Love Story" (with Lainey Wilson)	
October 17, 2026	Academy Museum Gala	Los Angeles	United States	"Blank Space"; "Love Story"; "The Fate of Ophelia"; "I Knew It, I Knew You"	

== Sporting events ==
List of sporting event performances, showing event names, dates, locations, and songs performed
Date	Event/Venue	City	Country	Performed song(s)	Ref.
April 5, 2002	Detroit Pistons–Philadelphia 76ers NBA game	Philadelphia	United States	"The Star-Spangled Banner"	
September 24, 2006	Cincinnati Bengals–Pittsburgh Steelers NFL game	Pittsburgh	United States	"The Star-Spangled Banner"	
November 12, 2006	2006 Checker Auto Parts 500	Avondale	United States	"The Star-Spangled Banner"	
November 23, 2006	NFL on Thanksgiving Day	Detroit	United States	"The Star-Spangled Banner"	
April 9, 2007	Los Angeles Dodgers–Colorado Rockies MLB game	Los Angeles	United States	"The Star-Spangled Banner"	
October 25, 2008	2008 World Series	Philadelphia	United States	"The Star-Spangled Banner"	
September 9, 2010	NFL Kickoff Game	New Orleans	United States	"Mine"; "You Belong with Me"	
October 22, 2016	Formula One United States Grand Prix	Austin	United States	"New Romantics"; "22"; "Blank Space"; "I Knew You Were Trouble"; "Style"; "You Belong with Me"; "Fifteen"; "Holy Ground"; "We Are Never Ever Getting Back Together" / "Bad Blood"; "Love Story"; "This Is What You Came For"; "Sparks Fly"; "Wildest Dreams" / "Enchanted"; "Out of the Woods"; "Shake It Off"	
February 4, 2017	Super Saturday Night	Houston	United States	"New Romantics"; "22"; "Blank Space"; "I Knew You Were Trouble"; "Style"; "I Don't Wanna Live Forever"; "You Belong with Me"; "This Is What You Came For"; "Better Man"; "Red"; "We Are Never Ever Getting Back Together"; "Love Story"; "All Too Well"; "Wildest Dreams" / "Enchanted"; "Bad Blood"; "Out of the Woods"; "Shake It Off"	

== Other live performances ==
List of miscellaneous live performances, showing event/venue names, dates, locations, and songs performed where applicable
Date	Event/Venue	City	Country	Performed song(s)	Ref.
July 4, 2006	St. Petersburg Pier	St. Petersburg	United States	"Tim McGraw"; "Our Song"; "I'd Lie"; "Permanent Marker"	
August 21, 2006	Yahoo! Entertainment's "Who's Next?"	Los Angeles	United States	"Tim McGraw"	
November 18, 2006	Anthem Christmas tree festivity	Anthem	United States	"Tim McGraw"	
February 8, 2007	Crocodile Rock Café	Allentown	United States	"Stay Beautiful"; "Tim McGraw"; "Sparks Fly"; "Missing You"; "Sweet Home Alabama"; "Picture to Burn"	
April 6, 2007	Sovereign Performing Arts Center	Reading	United States	"Lose Yourself"; "Missing You" (with Tyler Hilton); "Irreplaceable"; "Tim McGraw"	
August 15, 2008	Savannah Civic Center	Savannah	United States	"Our Song"; "Teardrops on My Guitar"; "Should've Said No"; "Change"; "Mary's Song (Oh My My My)"; "Picture to Burn"; "Tim McGraw"	
October 22, 2008	81st National FFA Convention & Expo Concert	Indianapolis	United States	"Love Story"; "Our Song"	
December 3, 2008	51st Grammy Nominations Concert	Los Angeles	United States	"I'm Sorry"; "White Horse"	
February 10, 2009	San Antonio Stock Show & Rodeo	San Antonio	United States	"You Belong with Me"; "Our Song"; "Tell Me Why"; "Teardrops on My Guitar"; "Forever & Always"; "Hey Stephen"; "White Horse"; "A Place in This World"; "Should've Said No"; "Fearless"; "Tim McGraw"; "Love Story"; "Change"; "Picture to Burn"	
March 20, 2009	Houston Livestock Show and Rodeo	Houston	United States	"You Belong with Me"; "Our Song"; "Tell Me Why"; "Teardrops on My Guitar"; "Forever & Always"; "Hey Stephen"; "White Horse"; "Should've Said No"; "Fearless"; "Tim McGraw"; "Love Story"; "Change"; "Picture to Burn"	
April 28, 2009	Bishop Ireton High School	Alexandria	United States	"You Belong with Me"; "White Horse"; "Hey Stephen"; "Our Song"; "Teardrops on My Guitar"; "Love Story"	
February 24, 2010	Country Radio Seminar	Nashville	United States	Unknown	
April 26, 2010	Auburn University	Auburn	United States	"Love Story"	
October 27, 2010	John F. Kennedy International Airport – Terminal 5	New York City	United States	"You Belong with Me"; "Back to December"; "Love Story"; "Speak Now"; "Mine"	
January 21, 2011	Allure of the Seas	Cozumel	Mexico	"Sparks Fly"; "Fearless" / "I'm Yours" / "Hey, Soul Sister"	
January 12, 2012	The Civil Wars' concert	Nashville	United States	"Safe & Sound" (with the Civil Wars)	
July 2, 2012	Tanglewood	Lenox	United States	"Fire and Rain" (with James Taylor); "Ours"; "Love Story"	
August 13, 2012	YouTube Webchat – Red's release announcement	Nashville	United States	"We Are Never Ever Getting Back Together"; "Treacherous"; "22"	
September 13, 2012	Taylor Swift's first Brazil concert	Rio de Janeiro	Brazil	"Sparks Fly"; "You Belong with Me"; "Mean"; "Love Story"; "Fifteen"; "We Are Never Ever Getting Back Together"; "Long Live" (with Paula Fernandes)	
March 1, 2013	Country Radio Seminar	Nashville	United States	"Cruise" (with Florida Georgia Line)	
June 3, 2013	50 & Counting	Chicago	United States	"As Tears Go By" (with the Rolling Stones)	
November 1, 2013	+ Tour	New York	United States	"Everything Has Changed" (with Ed Sheeran)	
March 26, 2015	The Big Revival Tour	Nashville	United States	"Big Star" (with Kenny Chesney)	
September 30, 2015	Grammy Museum at L.A. Live	Los Angeles	United States	"Wildest Dreams"; "Clean"; "How You Get the Girl"; "Blank Space"; "Out of the Woods"; "All You Had to Do Was Stay"; "Shake It Off"	
December 2, 2017	99.7'Now!'s Poptopia	San Jose	United States	"...Ready for It?"; "Blank Space"; "Shake It Off"; "I Don't Wanna Live Forever"; "End Game"; "Look What You Made Me Do"	
March 1, 2018	Spotify Singles	Nashville	United States	"September"; "Delicate"	
March 31, 2018	Bluebird Café Easter Eve concert	Nashville	United States	"Shake It Off"; "Better Man"; "Love Story"	
June 28, 2018	AT&T Taylor Swift NOW: Chicago secret concert	Chicago	United States	"Gorgeous"; "Delicate"; "All Too Well"; "New Year's Day"; "Shake It Off"	
April 23, 2019	Time 100 Gala	New York	United States	"Style"; "Delicate"; "Love Story"; "New Year's Day"; "Shake It Off"	
June 14, 2019	50th anniversary celebration of the Stonewall Riots	New York	United States	"Shake It Off" (with Jesse Tyler Ferguson)	
July 10, 2019	Amazon Prime Day Concert	New York	United States	"Me!"; "Blank Space"; "I Knew You Were Trouble"; "Love Story"; "Welcome to New York"; "Delicate"; "Style"; "You Need to Calm Down"; "Shake It Off"	
August 22, 2019	"Lover's Lounge" YouTube livestream	New York	United States	"The Archer"	
September 9, 2019	City of Lover	Paris	France	"Me!"; "Blank Space"; "I Knew You Were Trouble"; "The Archer"; "Love Story"; "Delicate"; "Death by a Thousand Cuts"; "Cornelia Street"; "The Man"; "All Too Well"; "Red"; "Daylight"; "Style"; "You Need to Calm Down"; "Lover"; "Shake It Off"	
October 16, 2019	Tiny Desk Concerts	Washington, D.C.	United States	"The Man"; "Lover"; "Death by a Thousand Cuts"; "All Too Well"	
November 10, 2019	Alibaba Singles' Day Gala	Shanghai	China	"Me!"; "Lover"; "You Need to Calm Down"	
October 30, 2021	Rock and Roll Hall of Fame – Carole King's induction ceremony	Cleveland	United States	"Will You Love Me Tomorrow"	
November 12, 2021	All Too Well: The Short Film premiere	New York	United States	"All Too Well (10 Minute Version)"	
June 11, 2022	Tribeca Film Festival	New York	United States	"All Too Well (10 Minute Version)"	
July 21, 2022	One More Haim Tour	London	England	"Gasoline" / "Love Story" (with Haim)	
October 26, 2022	I, I Tour	London	England	"Exile" (with Bon Iver and Aaron Dessner)	
January 12, 2023	At Their Very Best	London	England	"Anti-Hero"; "The City"	
June 9, 2026	Toy Story 5 premiere	Los Angeles	United States	"I Knew It, I Knew You"; "You've Got a Friend in Me" (with Randy Newman)	
August 18, 2026	The Icon Sessions at the Grammy Museum at L.A. Live	Los Angeles	United States	"I Knew It, I Knew You" / "August / "All Too Well (10 Minute Version)"	
