= Taylor Swift music =

Taylor Swift music may refer to:

- Taylor Swift albums discography
- Taylor Swift singles discography
- List of songs by Taylor Swift
- List of Taylor Swift live performances
