= Forever & Always =

2008 song by Taylor Swift

Song by Taylor Swift

from the album Fearless
- Released: November 11, 2008
- Recorded: October 2008
- Studio: Starstruck (Nashville)
- Genre: Country pop; pop rock
- Length: 3:45
- Label: Big Machine
- Songwriter: Taylor Swift
- Producers: Taylor Swift; Nathan Chapman

Audio video
- "Forever & Always" on YouTube

"Forever & Always (Taylor's Version)"

Song by Taylor Swift

from the album Fearless (Taylor's Version)
- Released: April 9, 2021
- Studio: Black Bird; Prime Recording (Nashville)
- Length: 3:45
- Label: Republic
- Songwriter: Taylor Swift
- Producers: Taylor Swift; Christopher Rowe

Lyric video
- "Forever & Always (Taylor's Version)" on YouTube

"Forever & Always" is a song written and recorded by the American singer-songwriter Taylor Swift for her second studio album, Fearless (2008). Inspired by her relationship with Joe Jonas, which lasted for several months in 2008, the lyrics are about an abrupt breakup that leaves the narrator angered and confused. Produced by Swift and Nathan Chapman, "Forever & Always" is a country pop and pop rock song instrumented by guitars and fiddles. It was the last track recorded for Fearless, being added to the album shortly before it was mastered and published. A "Piano Version" was released as part of the Fearless: Platinum Edition reissue in 2009.

Music critics deemed the production of "Forever & Always" catchy and highlighted the emotions in Swift's vocals, but a few considered the track generic. Journalists have commented that the song became the blueprint for Swift's songwriting inspired by her high-profile romantic relationships. Swift performed "Forever & Always" at several live events, including the 2009 Country Music Association Awards and her Fearless Tour (2009–2010). Commercially, the track reached the top 40 on the US Billboard Hot 100 chart and the Canadian Hot 100 chart, and it was certified platinum by the Recording Industry Association of America.

After a 2019 dispute regarding the ownership of Swift's back catalog, she re-recorded the song as "Forever & Always (Taylor's Version)" for her 2021 re-recorded album Fearless (Taylor's Version). The new version peaked at number 41 on the Billboard Global 200 and charted in Australia, Canada, Singapore, and the United States.

== Background and release ==
During 2007–2008, Taylor Swift toured as an opening act for other country musicians to promote her debut album, Taylor Swift (2006). While on tour, she wrote her second studio album, Fearless. To ensure her fans could relate to Fearless, she wrote about "love and what it does to us and how we treat people and how they treat us" and used her life experiences at 17–18 years old as inspirations.

"Forever & Always" was the last song that Swift wrote for Fearless. She pleaded with Big Machine Records' head Scott Borchetta to let her include the track on the album a day before the track list was finalized because it was about "something really, really dramatic and crazy" that needed to be addressed via music. The production took place at the last minute because Swift wrote songs to reflect her real-time experiences: "I can write something, call up my producer, we can get in the studio, put a rush on it, get an overnight mix." Recording of "Forever & Always" was completed in October 2008, one day before Fearless was mastered and published. Swift and Nathan Chapman produced the track, which was recorded at Starstruck Studio in Nashville.

Big Machine released Fearless on November 11, 2008, with "Forever & Always" as track number 11. A "Piano Version" of "Forever & Always" was released as part of the Platinum Edition reissue of Fearless on October 26, 2009. Supported by this "Piano Version", the track peaked at number 34 on the US Billboard Hot 100 chart issued for November 14, 2009. It was one of nine songs that Swift had on the Hot 100 that week, the first time a female artist had held nine chart entries at the same time. The Recording Industry Association of America awarded the song a platinum certification for surpassing one million units based on sales and streaming. The song peaked at number 37 on the Canadian Hot 100 and was certified gold in Australia.

Swift left Big Machine and signed with Republic Records in 2018. She began re-recording her first six studio albums in November 2020; this decision followed a 2019 dispute between Swift and the talent manager Scooter Braun, who acquired Big Machine Records and the masters of Swift's albums. Re-recording them would enable her to have full licensing rights of her songs for commercial use. The re-recordings of "Forever & Always" and its "Piano Version", both subtitled "Taylor's Version", were produced by Swift and Christopher Rowe; they were released as part of Fearless's re-recording, Fearless (Taylor's Version), on April 9, 2021, by Republic Records. "Forever & Always (Taylor's Version)" charted in Australia (45), Canada (37), Singapore (28), and the United States (65). It peaked at number 41 on the Billboard Global 200 chart.

== Writing and lyrics ==
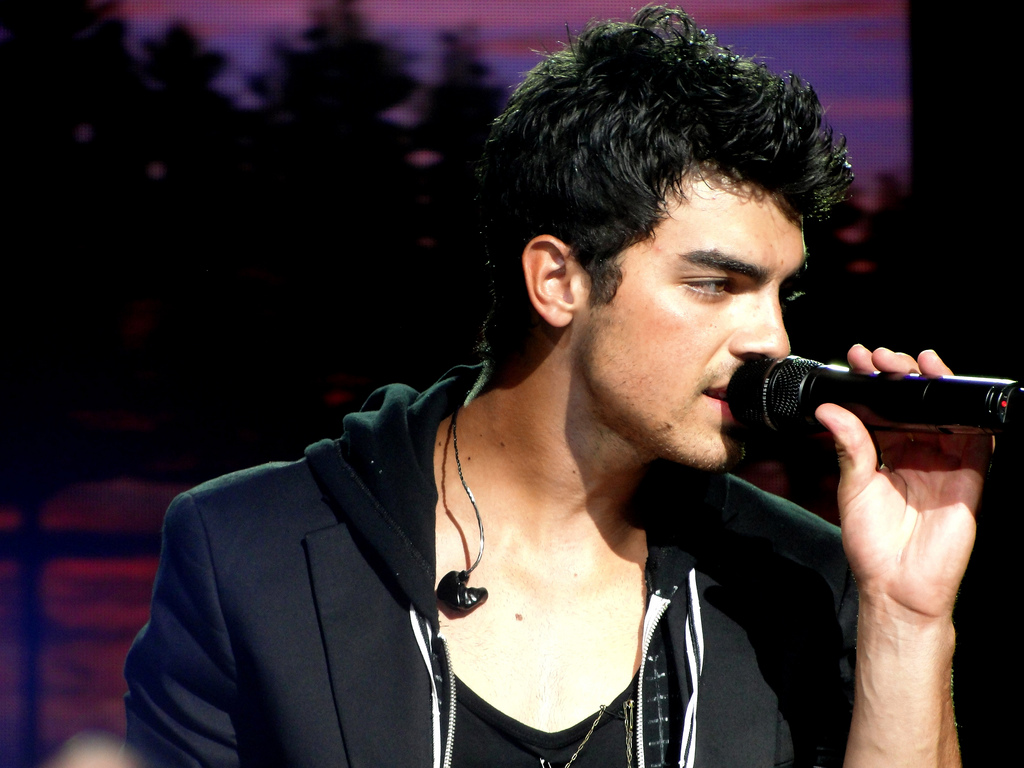
Swift's breakup with Joe Jonas inspired "Forever & Always".

Swift was inspired to write "Forever & Always" by her breakup with the singer Joe Jonas, whom she dated from July to October 2008. Appearing on The Ellen DeGeneres Show to promote Fearless in November 2008, Swift said that Jonas broke up with her "over the phone in 25 seconds". Feeling that she "owed it" to her fans to be open about their fallout, Swift publicized it via press interviews, on radio, and on her Myspace. Jonas addressed the song in a 2009 issue of Seventeen magazine: "It's flattering. It's always nice to hear their side of the story." Swift, in a May 2019 appearance on the Ellen show, recalled that "[putting] Joe Jonas on blast" in the past was the "most rebellious thing" she did as a teenager.

The lyrics of "Forever & Always" channel Swift's anger, sadness, and frustration in the immediate aftermath of the breakup. She said that the track's title was meant to be sarcastic: although the ex-boyfriend in the lyrics promised to stay with Swift's narrator forever, he unceremoniously broke up with her without proper explanations. This leaves the narrator wondering if it was because of something she did. Angered, she calls out the ex-boyfriend's behaviors, such as not calling her and running and hiding "like a scared little boy" when she told him something too direct. The lyrics use rain imagery to depict feelings of betrayal ("It rains in your bedroom, everything is wrong/ It rains when you're here and it rains when you're gone"), subverting its usage as a romantic trope in Swift's other songs.

The liner notes of Fearless include two "secret messages" for "Forever & Always" ("If you play these games, we're both going to lose") and its "Piano Version" ("Still miss who I thought he was"). (Note: The "secret messages" of Swift's songs are decoded by arranging certain capitalized letters in each song's lyrics, printed in the album booklet, in the order they appear to spell out a certain word or phrase.) The music critic Annie Zaleski described the tone of the track as "raw-nerve". Whereas Fearless features prominent influences from fairy tales, the heartache portrayed in "Forever & Always" is rooted in real-life experiences and thus embodies a more realistic outlook on love. Gigwise's Kelsey Barnes opined that the track represents a universal experience: a first-time heartbreak that was life-changing. Barnes added that she was fascinated by Swift's young age when she went through such a devastating loss. Lizzie Widdicombe of The New Yorker described the lyrics as "wistful" and "theatrically sad", and Callie Ahlgrim of Business Insider highlighted how the track shows Swift "practically [...] pacing around her bedroom", pondering over what went wrong.

== Music ==
"Forever & Always"
"Forever & Always" is a country pop and pop rock song instrumented by dynamic guitars and fiddles.

"Forever & Always (Piano Version)"
The "Piano Version" is instrumented by piano and cello and has a slower tempo.

At 3 minutes and 45 seconds long, "Forever & Always" is a country pop and pop rock song that features guitars and fiddles. Zaleski called it an "emo-country tune". Swift said that the music channeled her real-time emotions: the track begins with what Swift described as "this pretty melody that's easy to sing along with", and it ends with her "basically screaming" to reflect her anger. Tom Gardner of the Associated Press felt that the track showcased her "sweet unassuming voice [taking] on an edge". The arrangement of "Forever & Always (Taylor's Version)" is the same as the original's, but the production has a few differences: the rattle of the hi-hats is clearer and the fade-out in the outro is faster. Pitchfork's Dani Blum wrote that the vocals on "Taylor's Version" are "subdued but more full", suggesting sorrow and acceptance.

The "Piano Version", at 4 minutes and 27 seconds long, is instrumented by piano and cello. John Moser of The Morning Call described the sound as "piano rock" that resembles the styles of the Fray and Jack's Mannequin. For Barnes, this slower and plaintive piano production adds a new layer to the narrative: after expressing an angry outburst, Swift spent time to reflect on her pain and disbelief, bringing forth a more "heartbreaking" atmosphere. According to the professor in commercial music Michael A. Lee, the "Taylor's Version" re-recording features Swift's mature vocals and an enhanced piano production, recorded with a fuller range of frequencies. These changes make the piano sound more like a grand piano rather than an "upright, bordering on honky-tonk" one as in the original.

== Critical reception ==
Several reviews of "Forever & Always" described the production as catchy. Jim Farber of the New York Daily News selected it as one of the album's catchiest tracks that "soar", and Jane Song of Paste deemed it a "perfect pencil-drumming song". The musicologist James E. Perone similarly complimented the radio-friendly production but felt that it was too generic and "market-oriented" for a singer-songwriter like Swift. Blum selected the track as the album's best, highlighting the shock and woundedness that Swift's vocals convey. Moser and Billboard's Lisa Brown preferred the "Piano Version" to the original; the former deemed it the most interesting track of the Platinum Edition and praised Swift's vocals that suggested she could deliver more than just "teenage love songs", while the latter considered it more mature and cathartic. Writing for The A.V. Club, Mark Kate Carr complimented the original as a "certified banger" and the "Piano Version" for its "lovely arrangement" that allows for a brooding listening experience. Reviewing the re-recording "Taylor's Version", Stereogum's Tom Breihan opined that Swift's matured vocals add a refreshing perspective to a song about teenage feelings.

Other reviews focused on the lyricism. Several critics contended that "Forever & Always" became a blueprint for Swift's songwriting about her failed relationships that received media coverage. Billboard's Jennifer Keishin Armstrong regarded the track as Swift's first "tabloid-baiting kiss-off" that still managed to preserve Swift's image as an unassuming "suburban girl" who happened to be talented at songwriting. Hazel Cills of Pitchfork focused on the storytelling aspect of "Forever & Always": by "stacking minute summaries of a moment on top of each other", Swift created a storyboard of successive imagery to create a mini-story. Carr and NME's Hannah Mylrea said that the song contains some strong lyrics; the former thought that they contain a sophistication, and the latter was impressed by how Swift could "evoke the crushing feeling of a crumbling relationship in under four minutes". Vulture's Nate Jones placed the track at number 26 on his ranking of Swift's 245 songs up until April 2024; he praised the "colloquial" vocal delivery and contended that although the rain imagery does not make sense, it works "on an instinctual level".

== Live performances ==
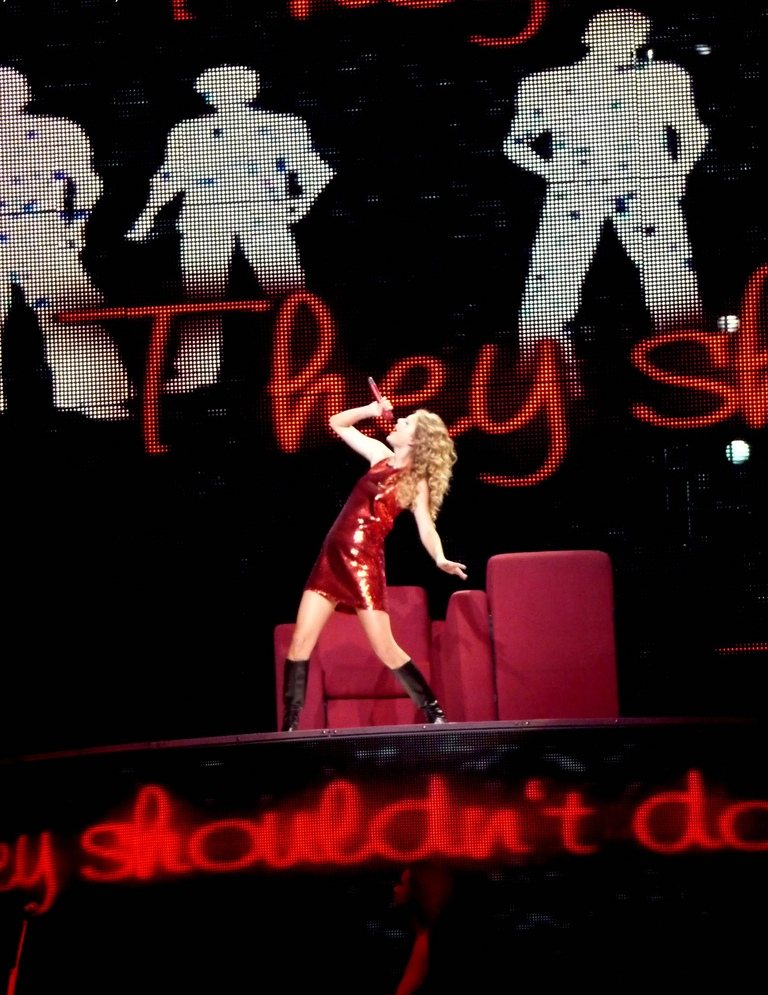
Swift performing "Forever & Always" on the Fearless Tour in 2010

Swift first performed "Forever & Always" at the 2009 Dick Clark's New Year's Rockin' Eve, held on December 31, 2008, in New York City. She performed the song as part of a medley with "Picture to Burn", "Love Story", and "Change". She performed "Forever & Always" again in a January 2009 episode of Saturday Night Live and the 2009 Country Music Association Awards in November, and she included it in the set lists of her concerts during the Houston Livestock Show and Rodeo in March, and Craven Country Jamboree in July 2009.

"Forever & Always" was part of the regular set list of Swift's first headlining concert tour, the Fearless Tour (2009–2010). The stage screened a mock interview of Swift on why she wrote songs that called out her ex-boyfriends before she appeared onstage in a red dress to sing the song. Midway through the number, she threw an armchair down the stairs onstage.

Swift occasionally performed "Forever & Always" on her later concert tours. She sang it at the March 22, 2013, show in Columbia, South Carolina, as part of the Red Tour, and the September 15, 2018, show in Indianapolis, Indiana, as part of the Reputation Stadium Tour. On the Eras Tour (2023–2024), she performed "Forever & Always" twice: at the May 13, 2023, show in Philadelphia, Pennsylvania, and as part of a piano mashup with her 2022 song "Maroon" at the February 26, 2024, show in Sydney, Australia.

== Personnel ==
"Forever & Always" (2008)

- Taylor Swift – lead vocals, songwriter, producer
- Chad Carslon – recording engineer, mixing engineer
- Nathan Chapman – producer
- Shawn Daugherty – assistant mixer
- Todd Tidwell – assistant mixer

"Forever & Always (Taylor's Version)" (2021)

- Taylor Swift – lead vocals, background vocals, songwriter, producer
- Max Bernstein – electric guitar
- Matt Billingslea – drums, percussion programming
- Dan Burns – percussion programming
- Derek Garten – additional engineer
- Serban Ghenea – mixing
- John Hanes – engineer
- Amos Heller – bass guitar
- Mike Meadows – acoustic guitar, background vocals
- David Payne – recording
- Lowell Reynolds – assistant recording engineer, additional engineer
- Christopher Rowe – producer, vocals recording
- Paul Sidoti – electric guitar, background vocals
- Jonathan Yudkin – fiddles

== Charts ==
=== "Forever & Always" ===
Chart positions
Chart (2008)	Peak position
Canada Hot 100 (Billboard)	37
US Billboard Hot 100	34
US Country Digital Song Sales (Billboard)	44

=== "Forever & Always (Taylor's Version)" ===
Chart positions for Taylor's version
Chart (2021)	Peak position
Australia (ARIA)	45
Canada (Canadian Hot 100)	37
Global 200 (Billboard)	41
Singapore (RIAS)	28
UK Audio Streaming (Official Charts)	83
US Billboard Hot 100	65
US Hot Country Songs (Billboard)	12

== Certifications ==
Certifications
Region	Certification	Certified units/sales
Australia (ARIA)	Gold	35,000^{‡}
Australia (ARIA) "Taylor's Version"	Gold	35,000^{‡}
New Zealand (RMNZ) "Taylor's Version"	Gold	15,000^{‡}
United States (RIAA)	Platinum	1,000,000^{‡}
^{‡} Sales+streaming figures based on certification alone.
