= Fearless (Taylor Swift song) =

2010 single by Taylor Swift

Single by Taylor Swift

from the album Fearless
- Released: January 4, 2010
- Studio: Blackbird (Nashville, Tennessee)
- Genre: Pop rock; country pop; country rock
- Length: 4:01
- Label: Big Machine
- Songwriters: Taylor Swift; Liz Rose; Hillary Lindsey
- Producers: Taylor Swift; Nathan Chapman

Taylor Swift singles chronology
"Two Is Better Than One" (2009)	"Fearless" (2010)	"Today Was a Fairytale" (2010)

Music video
- "Fearless" on YouTube

"Fearless" is a song by the American singer-songwriter Taylor Swift and the title track of her second studio album, Fearless (2008). She wrote the track with Liz Rose and Hillary Lindsey, and produced it with Nathan Chapman. A pop rock, country pop, and country rock song, "Fearless" is instrumented by booming drums and chiming guitars. Lyrically, it sees Swift's narrator embracing the romantic drive of a thrilling first date, allowing herself to live true to her heart.

Big Machine Records released "Fearless" to country radio in the United States as the album's fifth and final single on January 4, 2010. Music critics generally praised the production as catchy and engaging and the lyrics for portraying earnest adolescent sentiments; some retrospective reviews have regarded "Fearless" as one of Swift's best songs. In the United States, the single peaked at number nine on the Billboard Hot 100 and number 10 on Hot Country Songs, and it was certified platinum by the Recording Industry Association of America. The song also charted in Canada, Spain, and the United Kingdom.

Swift included "Fearless" in the set list to her first headlining tour, the Fearless Tour (2009–2010); footage from the tour was used in the song's music video. She later included the song in the set lists of the Speak Now World Tour (2011–2012) and the Eras Tour (2023–2024). After a 2019 dispute regarding the ownership of Swift's back catalog, she re-recorded the song and released it as "Fearless (Taylor's Version)" for her 2021 album Fearless (Taylor's Version). The re-recorded song charted in Australia, Canada, Singapore, and the United States.

== Background and writing ==
Taylor Swift wrote songs for her second studio album, Fearless, while touring as an opening act for other country musicians during 2007–2008, when she was 17–18 years old; she was promoting her first album, Taylor Swift (2006). Continuing the romantic themes of Taylor Swift, Fearless is about love and heartbreak from the perspective of a teenage girl, using autobiographical narratives embedded with high-school and fairy-tale imagery. According to Swift, this was a deliberate choice to ensure her fans could relate to her album, and nearly every track had a "face" that she associated with it. She and the producer Nathan Chapman recorded over 50 songs for Fearless, and "Fearless" was one of the 13 tracks that made the final cut.

Swift wrote "Fearless" with Liz Rose and Hillary Lindsey. She first conceived the track while touring, when she was single: "I wasn't even in the beginning stages of dating anybody." Her imaginations of what could happen during an ideal first date developed into a songwriting idea for the track. Summarizing the song's theme as "the best first date [she hasn't] had yet", Swift described "Fearless" as an aspirational song that deviated from other album songs about real-time feelings or experiences.

== Music and lyrics ==
"Fearless"
"Fearless" is a country pop, pop rock, and country rock song incorporating booming drums and chiming guitars.

Set over a tempo of 100 beats per minute, "Fearless" is four minutes and one second long. Swift and Chapman produced the track, which was recorded by Chad Carlson and mixed by Justin Niebank at Blackbird Studio in Nashville. "Fearless" is a country pop, pop rock, and country rock song. Its arrangement is driven by booming drums and chiming twelve-string guitars, played by multiple techniques including strumming, arpeggios, and melodic counterpoints. The production also incorporates mandolin, electric guitar, fiddle, and a subdued Hammond B3 organ; the bridge incorporates a key change. Swift's vocals span from F3 to C5. The musicologist James E. Perone writes that there are "unexpected musical influences" evoking diverse styles of country, pop, folk, and alternative rock in the drums, guitars, and other instruments' "tone colors". Larry Rodgers of The Arizona Republic categorized the song as "rootsy pop".

Lyrically, the song details Swift's imagination of an ideal first date: her narrator embraces the romantic drive and the thrilling sentiments. The narrator pays attention to the details, such as how the pavement glistens in the moonlight after a rain, how her date "runs [his] hand through [his] hair", and how she gets excited and nervous anticipating a first kiss. The couple have an impromptu dance in a parking lot and frolic in the rain before giving each other a passionate kiss. She relinquishes her pretense, allowing herself to live true to her heart: "I don't know why, but with you I'd dance in a storm in my best dress;" this lyric embodies some of the imagery commonly used in Swift's other songs: dancing, rain, and concealing one's timidity.

Swift described the song's greater concept as "the fearlessness of falling in love": "[No] matter how many times you get hurt, you will always fall in love again." Rob Sheffield, writing for Blender, opined that the lyric mentioning Swift's narrator getting caught in a storm "in my best dress" showed that she "likes to make a scene". For Annie Zaleski, the track encapsulates the excitement of a wonderful date that one wishes "would last forever". Amanda Ash of the Edmonton Journal thought that there is a sense of uncertainty under those thrilling moments.

== Release and commercial performance ==
"Fearless" was first released as a promotional single from the album on October 14, 2008, as part of "Countdown to Fearless", an exclusive campaign by the iTunes Store. Big Machine Records released Fearless on November 11, 2008. Swift chose "Fearless" as the title track because she felt it represented the overarching theme of the album about fearlessly being oneself: "fearless doesn't mean you're completely unafraid and it doesn't mean that you're bulletproof. It means that you have a lot of fears, but you jump anyway." The song was the fifth and final single from Fearless; Big Machine released it to country radio in the United States on January 4, 2010.

On the US Billboard Hot 100 chart dated November 1, 2008, "Fearless" debuted and peaked at number nine. It was Swift's second top-10 debut of 2008 after "Change", making her the first female artist since Madonna in 1998 to have two top-10 debuts in one calendar year. "Fearless" is one of the 13 tracks from Fearless to chart within the top 40 of the Billboard Hot 100, breaking the record for the most top-40 entries from a single album. It peaked at number 10 on the Hot Country Songs and number 18 on the Pop 100 charts. The Recording Industry Association of America awarded the single a platinum certification on October 23, 2012, and the single had sold one million downloads in the United States by November 2017.

In Canada, "Fearless" peaked at number 69 on the Canadian Hot 100 and number 7 on the Canada Country chart. The single peaked at number 32 in Spain and number 111 in the United Kingdom. It received a platinum certification in Australia.

== Critical reception ==
In reviews of Fearless, critics generally praised the title track for its catchy production. Those who picked it as an album highlight included the Hartford Courant's Thomas Kintner, who wrote that its "juicy jangling" production "keeps [Swift] ahead of the game", and The Baltimore Sun's Rashod D. Ollison, who described the sound as "breezy". Jody Rosen of Rolling Stone highlighted the loud guitars and dynamic refrains, and Jim Abbott of the Orlando Sentinel found the track suitable for "arena sing-alongs".

Others, such as Alice Fisher of The Guardian and Jim Harrington of The San Jose Mercury News, complimented the lyrics for portraying universal feelings evoked by love that appealed to a broad audience. In USA Today, Elysa Gardner appreciated the storytelling lyrics and the earnest "innocence and wonder" that the track portrayed. Ash thought that "Fearless" set the overall tone for the album and found it to incorporate a sense of maturity to the obvious teenage sentiments. In a less enthusiastic review, Jonathan Keefe of Slant Magazine wrote that the song demonstrated a lack of refinement in Swift's songwriting in how the meter "emphasizes the incorrect syllables of words".

Retrospective opinions on "Fearless" have remained generally positive. Zaleski described the production as "easygoing" but also bold, Swift's vocals "forceful", and the key change "epic". She also found the lyrical details vivid and specific that elevated the emotional engagement. Several critics have ranked the track highly among Swift's discography. Sheffield, in his 2024 ranking of Swift's 274 songs, placed "Fearless" at number 42. He praised how the lyrics incorporated many of the familiar tropes of her songwriting and the production "builds up to a swoon". Nate Jones of Vulture (2024) ranked the song 29th out of 245, hailing the way Swift channeled the thrilling emotions despite the lyrics using familiar themes.

"Fearless" was ranked among the 20 best songs by Swift by Billboard's Jason Lipshutz (2017), Paste's Jane Song (2020), Exclaim!'s Alex Hudson and Megan LaPierre (2024), and Variety's Chris Willman (2024). Lipshutz selected the opening lines ("There's something 'bout the way/ The street looks when it's just rained/ There's a glow off the pavement") as an example of Swift's abilities to depict romantic whimsy that not many artists could. Willman contended that the title track's "simpler ambitions" and "typically great melodic line" made it as enduring as other fairy tale–inspired Fearless songs. The Guardian's Alexis Petridis was not as welcoming, placing "Fearless" at number 35 on his ranking of Swift's 44 singles up until 2019. He wrote that while it was not a bad song, it lacked the "sucker-punch power" of other singles like "Love Story".

== Live performances and music video ==
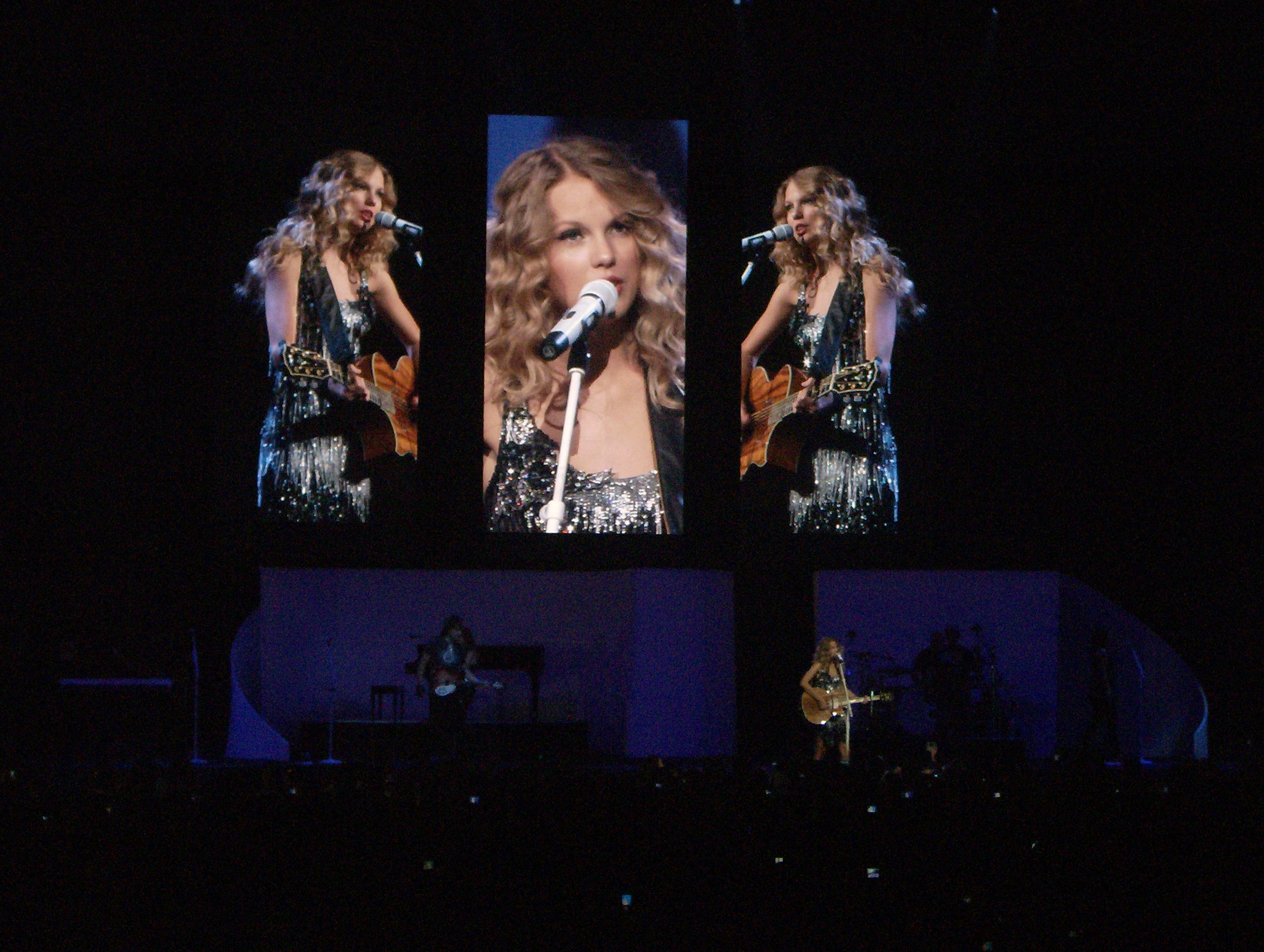
Swift performed "Fearless" on the Fearless Tour (2009–2010).

During promotion of Fearless, Swift performed the title track on Late Show with David Letterman on November 10, 2008, and as part of her concerts for the festivals and events she headlined in 2009, including the Houston Livestock Show and Rodeo and the Florida Strawberry Festival in March, and Craven Country Jamboree in July. She also performed it at the 2010 Summer Sonic Festival in Japan. Swift included "Fearless" in the set list of her first headlining concert tour, the Fearless Tour (2009–2010). For the performance of the song, she donned a silver sparkly cocktail dress and black cowboy boots, played a rhinestoned acoustic guitar, and twirled onstage. Recordings from the Fearless Tour were used in the music video for "Fearless", directed by Todd Cassetty; it intertwines Swift's performances with behind-the-scene footage.

On the Speak Now World Tour (2011–2012), Swift performed "Fearless" as part of an acoustic mashup with Jason Mraz's 2008 song "I'm Yours" and Train's 2009 song "Hey, Soul Sister", on ukulele. The performance was recorded and released on DVD as part of the live album Speak Now World Tour – Live. She occasionally performed "Fearless" as a "surprise" number outside the regular set lists of her later tours. On the Red Tour, she sang it at the shows in Houston (May 2013), Chicago (August 2013), and London (February 2014). She performed an acoustic version of "Fearless" during the San Diego show of the 1989 World Tour (August 2015) and the East Rutherford show of the Reputation Stadium Tour (July 2018).

The song was included as part of the regular set list for her sixth headlining concert tour, the Eras Tour (2023–2024). It served as the opening number for the Fearless act. She performed the track donning a golden fringe dress and playing a rhinestoned guitar, which evoked her fashion in the Fearless tour of 2008.

== Personnel ==
Adapted from the liner notes of Fearless

- Chad Carlson – recording
- Nathan Chapman – producer
- Taylor Swift – producer, lead vocals
- Justin Nieback – mixing
- Drew Bollman – mixing assistant

== Charts ==
=== Weekly charts ===
2010 weekly chart performance
Chart (2010)	Peak position
Canada Hot 100 (Billboard)	69
Canada Country (Billboard)	7
Spain (Promusicae)	32
UK Singles (OCC)	111
US Billboard Hot 100	9
US Hot Country Songs (Billboard)	10
US Pop 100 (Billboard)	18

2024 weekly chart performance
Chart (2024)	Peak position
Singapore (RIAS)	10

=== Year-end charts ===
Year-end chart performance
Chart (2010)	Position
US Hot Country Songs	55

== Certifications ==
Certification
Region	Certification	Certified units/sales
Australia (ARIA)	Platinum	70,000^{‡}
New Zealand (RMNZ)	Gold	15,000^{‡}
United States (RIAA)	Platinum	1,000,000^{*}
^{*} Sales figures based on certification alone.^{‡} Sales+streaming figures based on certification alone.

== "Fearless (Taylor's Version)" ==
"Fearless (Taylor's Version)"

Song by Taylor Swift

from the album Fearless (Taylor's Version)
- Released: April 9, 2021
- Studio: Blackbird (Nashville, Tennessee); Prime Recording (Nashville, Tennessee)
- Length: 4:01
- Label: Republic
- Songwriters: Taylor Swift; Liz Rose; Hillary Lindsey
- Producers: Taylor Swift; Christopher Rowe

Lyric video
- "Fearless (Taylor's Version)" on YouTube

After signing a new contract with Republic Records, Swift began re-recording her first six studio albums, including Fearless, in November 2020. The decision came after a 2019 public dispute between Swift and the talent manager Scooter Braun, who acquired Big Machine Records, including the masters of Swift's albums the label had released. By re-recording her catalog, Swift had full ownership of the new masters, including the copyright licensing of her songs. In doing so, she would benefit from the financial gains over the Big Machine–owned masters.

Swift released the re-recorded version of Fearless, titled Fearless (Taylor's Version), on April 9, 2021, via Republic; all re-recorded tracks contain the additional "Taylor's Version" moniker. A day prior to the album's release, a snippet of "Fearless (Taylor's Version)", the re-recording of the title track, premiered on Good Morning America. Swift and Christopher Rowe produced "Fearless (Taylor's Version)", which was recorded by David Payne at Blackbird and Prime Recording Studios in Nashville. Rowe recorded Swift's vocals at her home studio in London, and Serban Ghenea mixed the track at MixStar Studios in Virginia Beach, Virginia.

=== Reception ===
"Fearless (Taylor's Version)" has the same arrangement as its original counterpart, leading The New York Times's Joe Coscarelli to comment that the re-recorded version "[sounds] more remastered than rerecorded". There are subtle alterations in the details; The New York Times's Jon Pareles wrote that the re-recording omits the organ note 10 seconds into the song, and the commercial music professor Michael A. Lee identified the electric guitar as louder, particularly during the fade-out at the 3:53 mark. According to Pareles, the alternations are so slight that fans who were used to the original album would not tell the difference. Hannah Mylrea of NME deemed the instrumentation more refined while making the song retain its "starry-eyed lyricism" and "stellar instrumental arrangements", and Sheffield and Clash's Lucy Harbron highlighted Swift's matured vocals.

"Fearless (Taylor's Version)" peaked at number 53 on the Billboard Global 200. It charted in Canada (46) and Singapore (26). In the United States, the track peaked at number 71 on the Billboard Hot 100 and number 14 on Hot Country Songs. In Australia, "Fearless (Taylor's Version)" peaked at number 54 on the ARIA Singles Chart and was certified platinum. It was certified silver in the United Kingdom, where it peaked at number 99 on the UK Streaming Chart.

=== Personnel ===
Adapted from the liner notes of Fearless (Taylor's Version)

- Taylor Swift – vocals, songwriting, production
- Hillary Lindsey – songwriting
- Liz Rose – songwriting
- Christopher Rowe – production, vocal engineering
- Mike Meadows – acoustic guitar, twelve-string guitar, background vocals, Hammond B3, mandolin
- Derek Garten – engineering
- John Hanes – engineering
- Lowell Reynolds – engineering, recording
- David Payne – recording
- Caitlin Evanson – background vocals
- Paul Sidoti – background vocals, electric guitar
- Amos Heller – bass
- Matt Billingslea – drums
- Max Bernstein – electric guitar
- John Yudkin – fiddle
- Randy Merrill – mastering
- Serban Ghenea – mixing

=== Chart performance ===
Chart performance
Chart (2021)	Peak position
Australia (ARIA)	54
Canada (Canadian Hot 100)	46
Global 200 (Billboard)	53
New Zealand Hot Singles (RMNZ)	4
Singapore (RIAS)	26
UK Audio Streaming (Official Charts)	99
US Billboard Hot 100	71
US Hot Country Songs (Billboard)	14
US Rolling Stone Top 100	36

=== Certifications ===
Certifications
Region	Certification	Certified units/sales
Australia (ARIA)	Platinum	70,000^{‡}
New Zealand (RMNZ)	Gold	15,000^{‡}
United Kingdom (BPI)	Silver	200,000^{‡}
^{‡} Sales+streaming figures based on certification alone.
