= 45th Academy of Country Music Awards =

US music awards ceremony in 2010

- Date: April 18, 2010
- Location: MGM Grand Garden Arena, Las Vegas, Nevada
- Hosted by: Reba McEntire

Highlights
- Most wins: Miranda Lambert (3)
- Most nominations: Miranda Lambert; Lady A; Carrie Underwood; (5 each)

Television/radio coverage
- Network: CBS
- Viewership: 12.5 million

The 45th Academy of Country Music Awards were held on April 18, 2010, at the MGM Grand Garden Arena, Las Vegas, Nevada. The ceremony was hosted by ACM Award Winner Reba McEntire.

== Winners and nominees ==
Winners are shown in bold.

Entertainer of the Year (Note: From 2008 to 2015, 'Entertainer of the Year' was decided by a combination of ACM professional membership and fan votes cast online and via text message.)	Album of the Year
**Carrie Underwood**; Kenny Chesney; Toby Keith; Brad Paisley; George Strait; Taylor Swift; Keith Urban; Zac Brown Band	**Revolution – Miranda Lambert**; American Saturday Night – Brad Paisley; Lady Antebellum -– Lady Antebellum; Play On – Carrie Underwood; The Foundation – Zac Brown Band
Top Female Vocalist of the Year	Top Male Vocalist of the Year
**Miranda Lambert**; Reba McEntire; Taylor Swift; Carrie Underwood; Lee Ann Womack	**Brad Paisley**; Kenny Chesney; Darius Rucker; George Strait; Keith Urban
Top Vocal Group of the Year	Top Vocal Duo of the Year
**Lady Antebellum**; Little Big Town; Randy Rogers Band; Rascal Flatts; Zac Brown Band	**Brooks & Dunn**; Joey & Rory; Montgomery Gentry; Steel Magnolia; Sugarland
Single Record of the Year	Song of the Year
**"Need You Now" – Lady Antebellum**; "People Are Crazy" – Billy Currington; "Red Light" – David Nail; "Toes" – Zac Brown Band; "White Liar" – Miranda Lambert	**"Need You Now" – Dave Haywood, Josh Kear, Charles Kelley, Hillary Scott**; "Cowboy Casanova" – Mike Elizondo, Brett James, Carrie Underwood; "People Are Crazy" – Bobby Braddock, Troy Jones; "White Liar" – Natalie Hemby, Miranda Lambert; "You Belong With Me" – Liz Rose, Taylor Swift
Top New Artist of the Year	Video of the Year
**Luke Bryan**; Gloriana; Joey + Rory	**"White Liar" – Miranda Lambert**; "Boots On" – Randy Houser; "Need You Now" – Lady Antebellum; "Welcome to the Future" – Brad Paisley; "You Belong With Me" – Taylor Swift
Vocal Event of the Year
**"Hillbilly Bone" – Blake Shelton with Trace Adkins**; "Honky Tonk Stomp" – Brooks & Dunn with Billy Gibbons; "I Told You So" – Carrie Underwood with Randy Travis; "I'm Alive" – Kenny Chesney with Dave Matthews; "Seeing Stars" – Jack Ingram with Patty Griffin

== Performers ==
Performer(s)	Song(s)
Miranda Lambert; Carrie Underwood; Brad Paisley; John Fogerty; Charlie Daniels	"Travelin' Band"
Blake Shelton; Trace Adkins	"Hillbilly Bone"
Billy Currington	"That's How Country Boys Roll"
Kenny Chesney	"Ain't Back Yet"
Laura Bell Bundy	"Giddy On Up"
Toby Keith	"Cryin' for Me (Wayman's Song)"
Taylor Swift	"Change"
Gloriana; Luke Bryan; Joey + Rory	Top New Artist of the Year Medley "Wild at Heart" "Do I" "Cheater, Cheater"
Lady Antebellum	"American Honey"
Rascal Flatts	"Unstoppable"
Jason Aldean	"Crazy Town"
Miranda Lambert	"The House That Built Me"
Jack Ingram; Dierks Bentley	"Barbie Doll"
Carrie Underwood	"Temporary Home"
Tim McGraw	"Still"
Brad Paisley	"Water"
Brooks & Dunn	"My Maria"
Reba McEntire	"Keep On Loving You"
Keith Urban	"I'm In"
Darius Rucker	"Forever Road"

== Presenters ==
Award	Presenter(s)
Song of the Year	Faith Hill
Single of the Year	Joe Nichols; Lindsey Vonn
Top New Artist of the Year	Julianne Hough
Album of the Year	Kristen Bell
Top Vocal Group of the Year	Eddie Cibrian
Top Male Artist of the Year	Matthew McConaughey
Top Vocal Duo of the Year	Randy Travis; Carrie Underwood
Top Female Artist of the Year	Josh Duhamel
Entertainer of the Year	Reba McEntire
