= Welcome to New York (song) =

2014 song by Taylor Swift

Promotional single by Taylor Swift

from the album 1989
- Released: October 20, 2014
- Studio: Conway Recording (Los Angeles)
- Genre: Synth-pop; electropop; disco
- Length: 3:32
- Label: Big Machine
- Songwriters: Taylor Swift; Ryan Tedder
- Producers: Taylor Swift; Ryan Tedder; Noel Zancanella

Audio video
- "Welcome to New York" on YouTube

"Welcome to New York" is a song by the American singer-songwriter Taylor Swift from her fifth studio album, 1989 (2014). Written by Swift and Ryan Tedder, the song was inspired by Swift's relocation to New York City in April 2014. Its lyrics explore a newfound freedom in the city and a lighthearted attitude towards past heartbreaks.

Swift, Tedder, and Noel Zancanella produced "Welcome to New York", a track driven by pulsing synthesizers, programmed drums, and multitracked vocals. Music critics described the genre as synth-pop, electropop, and disco. The song was released for download on October 20, 2014, a week ahead of 1989's release. "Welcome to New York" received mixed reviews from critics, most of whom criticized the lyrics as unsophisticated for a New York tribute song. Some defenders praised the production as bright and catchy and interpreted the lyrics as being supportive of LGBT rights.

The song peaked within the top 20 of music charts in Canada, New Zealand, Hong Kong, Hungary, and Scotland. In the United States, it reached number 48 on the Billboard Hot 100 and was certified platinum by the Recording Industry Association of America. Swift donated all proceeds from the sales to the New York City Department of Education. She included the track in the set list of the 1989 World Tour (2015) and performed it on a few dates of her later tours. Following the 2019 dispute regarding the ownership of Swift's back catalog, she re-recorded the song as "Welcome to New York (Taylor's Version)" for her re-recorded album 1989 (Taylor's Version) (2023).

== Background ==
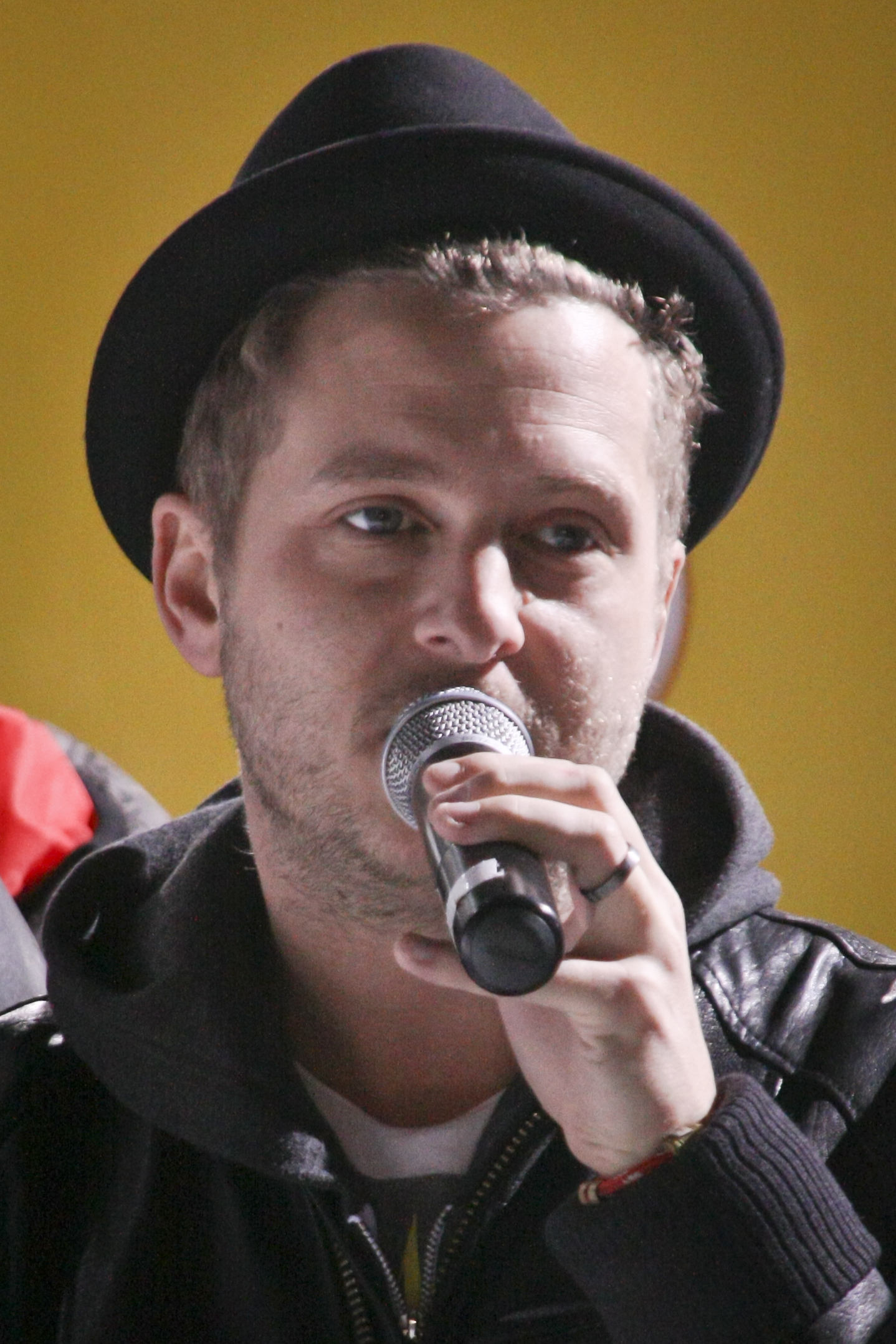
Ryan Tedder (pictured) co-wrote and co-produced "Welcome to New York" with Swift.

The singer-songwriter Taylor Swift abandoned the country stylings of her past music and embraced a pop production for her fifth studio album, 1989 (2014), which she marketed as her "first official" pop album. Her musical inspiration was 1980s synth-pop and its experimentation with synthesizers, drum pads, and overlapped vocals. She began writing the album in mid-2013 while touring in support of her fourth album, Red (2012), and enlisted prominent contemporary pop producers including Ryan Tedder, whom she contacted via a Voice Memo.

One of Swift's inspirations on 1989 was her relocation to New York City from Nashville in spring 2014. In a Rolling Stone interview, she recalled that she was "so intimidated" by the city and its "blaring honesty" that she thought she could not "make it here because [she] wasn't [...] bold enough, brave enough". Swift eventually felt ready to embrace it when she bought a penthouse in the Tribeca neighborhood in April 2014. She came to New York unattached to anybody romantically, after having received media attention for her dating life. According to Swift, her "wide-eyed optimism" prompted her to see New York as a place that inspired her to take on "endless potential and possibilities".

== Writing and production ==
"Welcome to New York" encapsulates Swift's feelings when she first moved to New York. She put it first on 1989's track list because she wanted to highlight New York as a memorable event in her life and a formative aesthetic influence of the album. In the lyrics, a narrator expresses their newfound sense of freedom ("Everybody here was someone else before") and compares living in New York to having a nice beat they could dance to. They move on from past heartbreaks ("Took our broken hearts, put them in a drawer"), celebrate the bright lights and energy, but maintain their identity ("The lights are so bright / But they never blind me, me")—Vogue's Alex Frank interpreted this as an answer to "Empire State of Mind" (2009) by Jay-Z and Alicia Keys. The second verse's lyrics, "And you can want who you want / Boys and boys and girls and girls", generated interpretations from some publications as Swift's support for diversity and LGBT rights. The music scholar Eric Smialek contended that the lyrics received media attention due to "popular belief" that Swift was politically inactive. According to Smialek, the LGBT representation is "not foregrounded" but displays "at least incidental awareness and advocacy".

"Welcome to New York"
A synth-pop song, "Welcome to New York" features a pulsing Juno-106 synthesizer, programmed drum machines, and multitracked vocals. The lyrics were inspired by Swift's feelings when she first moved to New York City in 2014.

Because Swift wanted a 1980s-influenced sound, Tedder programmed the song with a Juno-106 synthesizer, which he described as a "very 1980s" instrument. He finished the first draft in three hours and completed the first demo later that week. While touring in Switzerland, Tedder produced four other versions. Though he preferred one later version, Swift chose the one closest to the first demo as the final version. Swift and Tedder produced "Welcome to New York" with Noel Zancanella, who played additional synthesizers and programmed the drums. Tedder and Smith Carlson recorded the track at Conway Recording Studios in Los Angeles, California. It was mixed by Serban Ghenea at MixStar Studios in Virginia Beach, Virginia, and mastered by Tom Coyne at Sterling Sound Studios in New York. The track is 3 minutes and 32 seconds long.

"Welcome to New York" opens with pulsing synthesizers and programmed drum machines that create clapping-like rhythms. Swift's vocals are multitracked and processed with electronic elements. According to the musicologist James E. Perone, the composition is monothematic, demonstrated by repetitions of one single pitch throughout both the verses and the refrains. In contemporary reviews, music critics characterized the genre as synth-pop. (Note: Attributed to USA Today's Brian Mansfield, Slate's Forrest Wickman, the Boston Herald's Jed Gottlieb, and the New York Daily News' Jim Farber) Lindsay Zoladz from Vulture described it as electropop, and Rob Sheffield of Rolling Stone deemed it a "disco ode" to New York, the birthplace of disco. The song's pulsing synth production sets the tone for 1989's 1980s-indebted sound. There were comparisons to music by other artists: Perone said the synthesizers and drum machines called to mind 1980s artists Cyndi Lauper and Prince, NME's Matthew Horton wrote the "synth jab" evoked the band OMD, and The New Zealand Herald found the production reminiscent of Robyn.

== Release ==
Big Machine Records released "Welcome to New York" for download via the iTunes Store on October 20, 2014, a week ahead of 1989's release. Swift had shared a 30-second sample of the song via YouTube a day prior. In the United States, the song peaked at number 48 on the Billboard Hot 100 and was certified platinum by the Recording Industry Association of America (RIAA) for accumulating one million units based on sales and streams. In the United Kingdom, it peaked at numbers 16 and 39 on the Scottish and UK singles charts respectively and was certified silver by the British Phonographic Industry (BPI) for surpassing 200,000 units. It peaked at number 23 on the singles chart of Australia, where it was certified double-platinum by the Australian Recording Industry Association (ARIA) for surpassing 140,000 units. Elsewhere, it was a top-10 song in New Zealand (peaking at number 6), and reached the top 30 in Hungary (16), Canada (19), Spain (21), and Denmark (27).

Swift donated all proceeds of the sales of "Welcome to New York" to the New York City Department of Education. NYC & Company named Swift an official tourism ambassador for New York City, a move that generated media controversy; various publications regarded the song as a "gentrification anthem" that did not represent an authentic New York and the Nashville-based Swift as an unfit candidate compared to New York-born-and-raised celebrities such as Robert De Niro and Jennifer Lopez. NYC & Co's spokesman defended Swift and said that the campaign was "a new approach" that focused on "the wonderment and excitement" of a person first arriving at the city. The urban studies scholar Alessandro Busà commented that Swift was a fitting choice for NYC & Co's promotion of a "new New York City", which he described as a "sanitized, young, rather hipsterish brand".

== Critical reception ==
"Welcome to New York" received a mixed reaction from critics. Most criticisms regarded the lyrics as unsophisticated and superficial for a New York tribute song and subpar for Swift's artistry. They added that Swift's depiction and love of New York neglected the real-life socioeconomic issues that most city residents had to face. Jason Lipshutz of Billboard wrote: "while Swift perkily admires [the city], she doesn't remark on the subway rats or waking up in closet-sized bedrooms." The synth production also received negative comments from two Time critics as being "cheesy" and "lifeless". Jon Caramanica from The New York Times described the track as "shimmery [...] if slightly dim", and Fact's Aimee Cliff complained how the song "manages to reduce an entire city to a pristine skyline seen from a top floor window". Caramanica, Cliff, and Zoladz picked "Welcome to New York" as one of 1989's weakest tracks, as did Parade's Samuel R. Murrian and Spin's Al Shipley in retrospective reviews.

Speaking to Billboard regarding the reaction, Swift said it made her think differently but defended the song because she was focusing on how to capture a "momentary emotion". She added, "To take a song and try to apply it to every situation everyone is going through—economically, politically, in an entire metropolitan area—is asking a little much of a piece of a [sic] music." There were some sympathetic comments. Robert Christgau said, "I think it's silly to demand sociology from someone who can't stroll Central Park without bodyguards." PopMatters's Corey Baesley wrote that "Welcome to New York" was both "undeniably catchy" and "completely unlistenable", but the song was a reasonable album opener because "it's a manifesto, not an overture". In Consequence of Sound, Sasha Geffen opined that the track is not about New York City itself but "New York City the idea—an aspirational playground always situated slightly out of reach". Daniel D'Addario of Time highlighted the LGBT implications and described the song as a "new kind of equality anthem".

Some reviews were more appreciative. Roison O'Connor from The Independent contended that the song received an "unfair rap" from critics and complimented it as "a blast of fresh air". Spin magazine's Andrew Unterberger highlighted the track as a representation of Swift's adulthood and mature perspective, and Marah Eakin of The A.V. Club deemed it catchy. Perone labeled the track as "an engaging, popular, and very interesting song within the Swift canon", and Annie Zaleski similarly regarded it as a unique track in Swift's discography, highlighting the "production touches that whoosh like a cool breeze". "Welcome to New York" featured as one of Swift's best songs on lists by Clash (2021) and Billboard (2023).

== Live performances and other uses ==
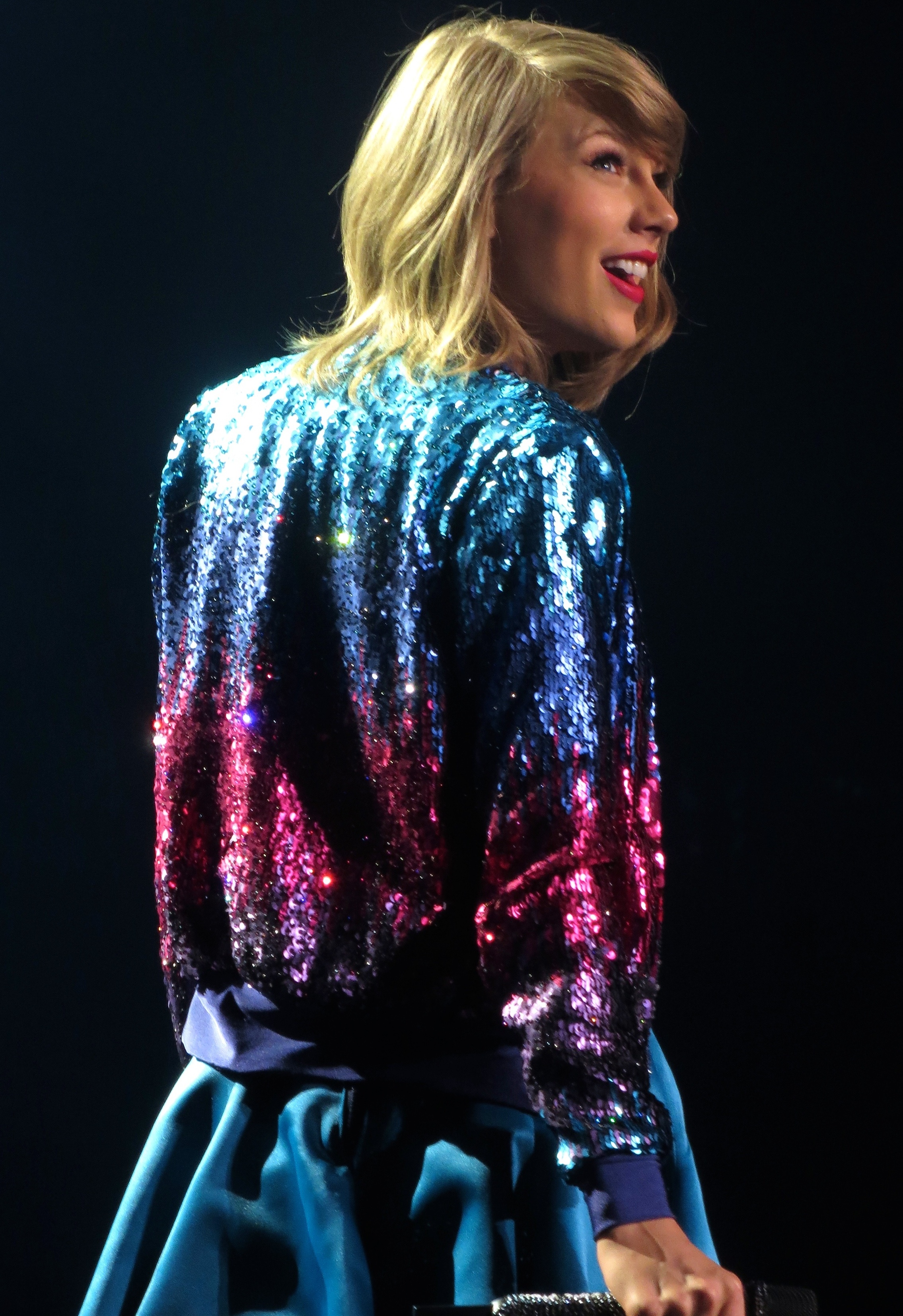
Swift on the 1989 World Tour, where she performed "Welcome to New York" as the opening number

On October 27, 2014, to celebrate the album's release, Swift held a concert called "1989 Secret Sessions" in Manhattan. It featured tracks from 1989, including "Welcome to New York", and was live streamed by Yahoo! and iHeartRadio. During promotion of the album, Swift performed "Welcome to New York" on TV shows including Late Show with David Letterman and Good Morning America. She also performed the song during two events in 2019: the Amazon Prime Day concert and Z100's iHeartRadio Jingle Ball. "Welcome to New York" was the opener in the set list for Swift's 2015 tour, the 1989 World Tour. Swift performed it as a "surprise song" outside the regular set list during two concerts of her later tours: at the East Rutherford show as part of her Reputation Stadium Tour on July 20, 2018, and again at East Rutherford as part of the Eras Tour on May 28, 2023. On the latter tour's she sang the song with a piano at the Stockholm stop on May 18, 2024, where Swift sang it as part of a medley with "Say Don't Go" (2023) and "Clean" (2014) and at the New Orleans stop on October 26, 2024, where she sang it as part of a medley with "Hits Different" (2022).

The singer-songwriter Ryan Adams recorded a cover version of "Welcome to New York" for his 2015 track-by-track cover album of Swift's 1989. His version features an acoustic arrangement backed by building strings, guitar strums, piano, and drums. Adams sings with vocals that critics described as "aching" and "clenched-teeth". Dan Caffrey from Consequence of Sound said Adams's "Welcome to New York" incorporates influences of power pop that resemble the music of Tom Petty. PopMatters writer Evan Sawdey deemed the song the weakest track on Swift's 1989 but complimented Adams for giving it a "warmer, more humanistic treatment", and The Observer's Emily Mackay regarded it as "a desperate hit of Springsteenian yearning" that was among the album's better songs. By contrast, Sarah Murphy from Exclaim! opined that the cover was "rendered ridiculous when sung by a weathered rock star".

== Personnel ==
Credits adapted from the liner notes of 1989

- Taylor Swift – vocals, songwriter, producer
- Smith Carlson – recording
- Tom Coyne – mastering
- Eric Eylands – assistant recording
- Serban Ghenea – mixing
- John Hanes – engineered for mix
- Ryan Tedder – producer, recording, songwriter, background vocals, piano, Juno
- Matthew Tryba – assistant recording
- Noel Zancanella – producer, drum programming, synthesizer

== Charts ==
2014 chart performance of "Welcome to New York"
Chart (2014)	Peak position
Australia (ARIA)	23
Canada Hot 100 (Billboard)	19
Denmark (Tracklisten)	27
Euro Digital Song Sales (Billboard)	20
France (SNEP)	85
Hong Kong (HKRIA)	12
Hungary (Single Top 40)	16
Ireland (IRMA)	55
Japan Hot 100 (Billboard)	80
New Zealand (Recorded Music NZ)	6
Scottish Singles Sales (Official Charts)	16
Spain (Promusicae)	21
UK Singles (Official Charts)	39
US Billboard Hot 100	48

2023 chart performance of "Welcome to New York"
Chart (2023)	Peak position
Portugal (AFP)	59

== Certifications ==
Certifications for "Welcome to New York"
Region	Certification	Certified units/sales
Australia (ARIA)	2× Platinum	140,000^{‡}
New Zealand (RMNZ)	Platinum	30,000^{‡}
United Kingdom (BPI)	Gold	400,000^{‡}
United States (RIAA)	Platinum	1,000,000^{‡}
^{‡} Sales+streaming figures based on certification alone.

== "Welcome to New York (Taylor's Version)" ==
"Welcome to New York (Taylor's Version)"

Song by Taylor Swift

from the album 1989 (Taylor's Version)
- Released: October 27, 2023
- Studio: Mandarin Oriental (Milan)
- Length: 3:32
- Label: Republic
- Songwriters: Taylor Swift; Ryan Tedder
- Producers: Taylor Swift; Ryan Tedder; Noel Zancanella

Lyric video
- "Welcome to New York (Taylor's Version)" on YouTube

After signing a new contract with Republic Records, Swift began re-recording her first six studio albums in November 2020. The decision followed a public 2019 dispute between Swift and the talent manager Scooter Braun, who acquired Big Machine Records, including the masters of Swift's albums which the label had released. By re-recording the albums, Swift had full ownership of the new masters, which enabled her to control the licensing of her songs for commercial use and therefore substituted the Big Machine–owned masters.

The re-recording of "Welcome to New York", subtitled "Taylor's Version", was released as part of 1989's re-recording, 1989 (Taylor's Version), on October 27, 2023. Swift, Tedder, and Zancanella produced "Welcome to New York (Taylor's Version)", which was recorded by Tedder and Rich Rich at the Mandarin Oriental in Milan, Italy; mixed by Ghenea at MixStar Studios in Virginia Beach, Virginia; and mastered by Randy Merrill at Sterling Sound in Edgewater, New Jersey. Tedder and Zancanella played the synthesizers, the former provided background vocals and played additional piano, and the latter programmed the drums.

Some reviews of "Welcome to New York (Taylor's Version)" commented that its production and energy remained identical to that of the original song. The Independent's Adam White said the re-recorded track "goes harder with its synths", and the Financial Times' Ludovic Hunter-Tilney labelled it an "irresistibly bright tribute" to New York City. The re-recorded track peaked at number 16 on the Billboard Global 200. It debuted in the top 20 of singles charts in Australia (11), the Philippines (11), New Zealand (14), the United States (number 14), and Canada (15). In the United States, the song's top-20 debut extended Swift's record for the most top-20 chart entries by a female artist.

=== Personnel ===
Credits adapted from the liner notes of 1989 (Taylor's Version)

- Taylor Swift – lead vocals, songwriter, producer
- Bryce Bordone – engineer for mix
- Serban Ghenea – mixing
- Randy Merrill – mastering
- Rich Rich – recording engineer
- Christopher Rowe – vocals recording
- Ryan Tedder – recording engineer, producer, songwriter, piano, synthesizer, background vocals
- Noel Zancanella – drum programming, producer, synthesizer

=== Charts ===
Chart performance for "Welcome to New York (Taylor's Version)"
Chart (2023)	Peak position
Australia (ARIA)	11
Canada (Canadian Hot 100)	15
Global 200 (Billboard)	16
Greece International (IFPI)	30
Ireland (Billboard)	16
New Zealand (Recorded Music NZ)	14
Philippines (Billboard)	11
Singapore (RIAS)	19
Sweden (Sverigetopplistan)	80
UK (Billboard)	12
UK Singles Downloads (Official Charts)	96
UK Streaming (OCC)	15
US Billboard Hot 100	14
Vietnam (Vietnam Hot 100)	76

=== Certification ===
Certification for "Welcome to New York (Taylor's Version)"
Region	Certification	Certified units/sales
Australia (ARIA)	Gold	35,000^{‡}
Brazil (Pro-Música Brasil)	Platinum	40,000^{‡}
United Kingdom (BPI)	Silver	200,000^{‡}
^{‡} Sales+streaming figures based on certification alone.
