= 2009 Country Music Association Awards =

Annual US music awards ceremony

- Date: November 11, 2009
- Location: Sommet Center, Nashville, Tennessee, United States of America
- Hosted by: Brad Paisley; Carrie Underwood

Highlights
- Most wins: Taylor Swift (4)
- Most nominations: Brad Paisley (7)

Television/radio coverage
- Network: ABC
- Viewership: 17.1 million

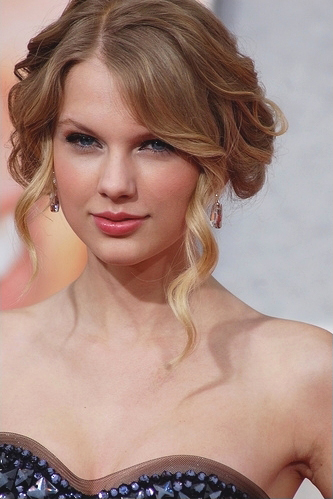
Taylor Swift, Entertainer of the Year recipient.

The 2009 Country Music Association Awards, 43rd Annual Ceremony, was held on November 11, 2009, at the Sommet Center (later the Bridgestone Arena) in Nashville, Tennessee and was hosted by Brad Paisley and Carrie Underwood for the second time. Taylor Swift became the youngest person in CMA history to be nominated for and win Entertainer of the Year.

== Winners and nominees ==
Winners are shown in Bold.

| Entertainer of the Year | Album of the Year |
|---|---|
| **Taylor Swift**; Kenny Chesney; Brad Paisley; George Strait; Keith Urban | **Fearless** **— Taylor Swift**; American Saturday Night — Brad Paisley; Defying Gravity — Keith Urban; Love on the Inside — Sugarland; That Lonesome Song — Jamey Johnson |
| Male Vocalist of the Year | Female Vocalist of the Year |
| **Brad Paisley**; Kenny Chesney; Darius Rucker; George Strait; Keith Urban | **Taylor Swift**; Miranda Lambert; Martina McBride; Reba McEntire; Carrie Underwood |
| Vocal Group of the Year | Vocal Duo of the Year |
| **Lady Antebellum**; Eagles; Little Big Town; Rascal Flatts; Zac Brown Band | **Sugarland**; Big & Rich; Brooks & Dunn; Joey + Rory; Montgomery Gentry |
| Single of the Year | Song of the Year (Songwriters' Award) |
| **"I Run to You"** — Lady Antebellum; "Chicken Fried" — Zac Brown Band; "In Color" — Jamey Johnson; "People Are Crazy" — Billy Currington; "Then" — Brad Paisley | **"In Color" — Jamey Johnson, Lee Thomas Miller and James Otto**; "Chicken Fried" — Zac Brown and Wyatt Durrette III; "I Told You So" — Randy Travis; "People Are Crazy" — Zac Brown, Wyatt Durrette III, John Driskell Hopkins and Shawn Mullins; "Then" — Brad Paisley, Chris DuBois and Ashley Gorley |
| New Artist of the Year | Musician of the Year |
| **Darius Rucker**; Randy Houser; Jamey Johnson; Jake Owen; Zac Brown Band | **Mac McAnally**; Eddie Bayers; Paul Franklin; Dan Huff; Brent Mason |
| Music Video of the Year | Musical Event of the Year |
| **"Love Story" — Taylor Swift; (Dir. Trey Fanjoy)**; "Boots On" — Randy Houser; (Dir. Drake Vaughan and Eric Welch); "People Are Crazy" — Billy Currington; (Dir. The Brads); "Start a Band" — Brad Paisley and Keith Urban; (Dir. Jim Shea); "Old Enough" — The Raconteurs feat. Ricky Skaggs and Ashley Monroe; (Dir. Autumn de Wilde) | **"Start a Band"** — **Brad Paisley and Keith Urban**; "Cowgirl's Don't Cry" — Brooks & Dunn and Reba McEntire; "Down The Road" — Kenny Chesney and Mac McAnally; "Everything But Quits" — Lee Ann Womack and George Strait; "Old Enough" — The Raconteurs, Ricky Skaggs and Ashley Monroe; "I Told You So" — Carrie Underwood and Randy Travis |

== Performers ==
| Artist(s) | Song(s) |
|---|---|
| Taylor Swift | "Forever & Always" |
| Darius Rucker | "Alright" |
| Miranda Lambert | "White Liar" |
| Brad Paisley | "Welcome to the Future" |
| Zac Brown Band | "The Devil Went Down to Georgia" |
| George Strait | "Twang" |
| Lady Antebellum | "Need You Now" |
| Carrie Underwood | "Cowboy Casanova" |
| Vince Gill; Daughtry | "Tennessee Line" |
| Keith Urban | "'Til Summer Comes Around" |
| Tim McGraw | "Southern Voice" |
| Sugarland | "Keep You" |
| Brooks & Dunn; Billy Gibbons | "Honky Tonk Stomp" |
| Jamey Johnson; Kid Rock | "Between Jennings and Jones" |
| Taylor Swift | "Fifteen" |
| Jason Aldean | "Big Green Tractor" |
| Martina McBride; George Strait | Tribute to Barbara Mandrell "I Was Country When Country Wasn't Cool" |
| Reba McEntire | "Consider Me Gone" |
| Billy Currington | "People Are Crazy" |
| Kenny Chesney; Dave Matthews | "I'm Alive" |

== Presenters ==
| Presenter(s) | Award |
|---|---|
| Kid Rock | Single of the Year |
| Kellie Pickler and Jake Owen | Song of the Year |
| Patricia Heaton and Neil Flynn | Vocal Group of the Year |
| The Judds | New Artist of the Year |
| Randy Houser and Robin Roberts | Album of the Year |
| Dale Earnhardt, Jr. and Julianne Hough | Vocal Duo of the Year |
| LeAnn Rimes | Male Vocalist of the Year |
| Kris Kristofferson and Lee Ann Womack | Female Vocalist of the Year |
| Tim McGraw and Faith Hill | Entertainer of the Year |
