= Long Live (Taylor Swift song) =

2010 song by Taylor Swift

Song by Taylor Swift

from the album Speak Now
- Written: June 2010
- Released: October 25, 2010
- Genre: Arena rock; heartland rock; pop rock
- Length: 5:17
- Label: Big Machine
- Songwriter: Taylor Swift
- Producers: Taylor Swift; Nathan Chapman

Audio video
- "Long Live" on YouTube

"Long Live" is a song written and recorded by the American singer-songwriter Taylor Swift for her third studio album, Speak Now (2010). Produced by Swift and Nathan Chapman, "Long Live" is an arena rock, heartland rock, and pop rock song featuring girl group harmonies and chiming rock guitars. The lyrics are about Swift's gratitude for her fans and bandmates, using high-school and royalty imagery to describe the accomplishments in the narrator's life.

After Speak Now was released, "Long Live" entered and peaked at number 85 on the US Billboard Hot 100. Some music critics deemed it an album highlight and lauded the production and lyrics, but others felt it was generic and unmemorable. A remix featuring verses written and sung in Portuguese by the Brazilian singer Paula Fernandes, accompanied by a music video, was released as a digital single in Brazil in January 2012 to promote the live album Speak Now World Tour – Live. A commercial successes in Brazil, "Long Live" peaked at number five on the Brasil Hot 100 Airplay chart and was certified four-times diamond by Pro-Música Brasil.

Swift included the song on the set lists of three of her world tours — the Speak Now World Tour (2011–2012), Reputation Stadium Tour (2018), and The Eras Tour (2023–2024) — and performed it on select dates of the Red Tour (2013–2014) and the 1989 World Tour (2015). A re-recorded version, titled "Long Live (Taylor's Version)", was released as part of Swift's third re-recorded album Speak Now (Taylor's Version) on July 7, 2023. The re-recorded version was also featured in the end credits in the accompanying concert film.

== Composition and lyrics ==
"Long Live"
"Long Live" features chiming rock guitars, loud cymbals, and girl-group-styled vocal harmonies.

Taylor Swift released her third studio album, Speak Now, on October 25, 2010. She wrote all 14 tracks on the standard album by herself and co-produced them with Nathan Chapman. "Long Live" is the closing track of Speak Now's 14-track standard edition. Musically, "Long Live" is an arena rock, heartland rock, and pop rock song featuring contemporary country elements, chiming rock guitars, loud cymbal beats, and girl-group-styled vocal harmonies. Rob Sheffield in Rolling Stone compared the song's guitars to those on "Hysteria" by Def Leppard, while the musicologist James E. Perone compared the song's production to rock music from the 1980s, specifically the music of the Irish band U2.

Swift dedicated "Long Live" to her bandmates and fans. The lyrics celebrate moments of triumph in the narrator's life, featuring royalty (kings and queens) and high school imagery ("You traded your baseball cap for a crown / And they gave us our trophies / And we held them up for our town") to describe the accomplishments in life. The narrator describes herself as a queen who, with a king by her side, fights dragons to protect her kingdom. Swift also acknowledges that her triumph will fade some day, and there are bittersweet and poignant moments ("But if God forbid fate should step in / And force us into a goodbye / If you have children someday / When they point to the pictures / Please tell them my name"). Towards the end, Swift sings, "Will you take a moment / Promise me this / That you'll stand by me forever", which Billboard interpreted as her message to her fans. Perone commented that the lyrical theme of overcoming odds to achieve victory, coupled with the "near anthem-like structure", resembles David Bowie's 1977 classic "Heroes". Brittany Spanos from Rolling Stone agreed with this interpretation, saying that "Long Live" throws back to "Heroes" by how "it portrays two lovers who have amicably parted ways but not without leaving an unforgettable mark on one another".

In Vulture, Nate Jones commented that despite Swift's intention to dedicate the track to her bandmates and fans, the "adolescent self-mythologizing" lyrics are universal enough to be taken as a graduation song. Jonathan Keefe from Slant Magazine commented that the track features fairy-tale imagery recalling Swift's 2008 album Fearless. In an analysis for the New Statesman, Anna Leszkiewicz deemed the imagery of crowns, kings, and queens in "Long Live" a representation of Swift's optimism towards her life and career, and her earnestness with her fans. Leszkiewicz noted that in some of Swift's later songs, such as "Blank Space" (2014) and "Call It What You Want" (2017), the imagery became darker and represented the pitfalls of celebrity. Some lyrics of the song are included in one of Swift's journal entries from June 2010, printed in the liner notes of her 2019 studio album Lover.

== Live performances ==
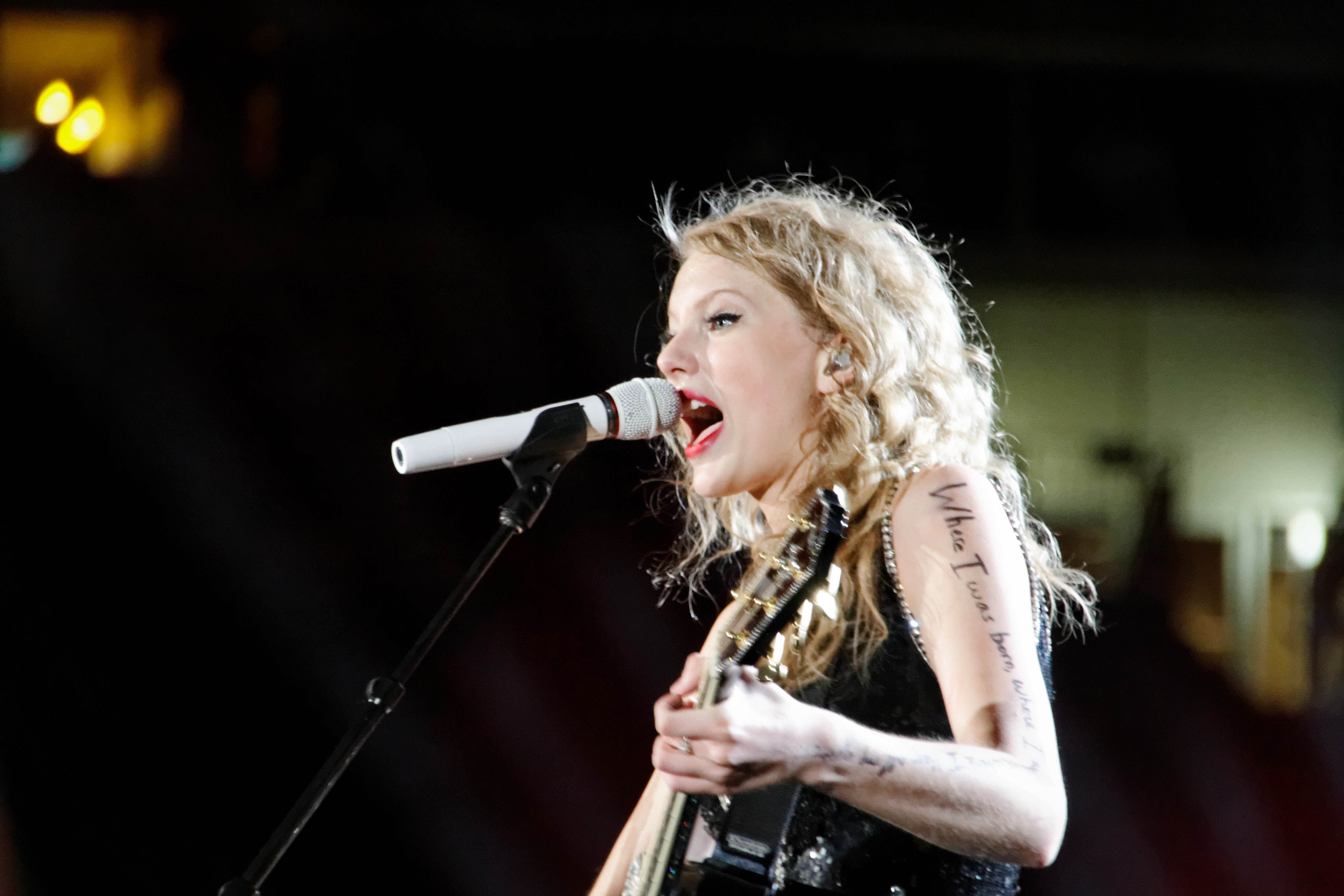
Swift performing "Long Live" on the Speak Now World Tour (pictured in Pittsburgh in 2011)

Swift's first live performance of "Long Live" was for an NBC Speak Now Thanksgiving Special, which broadcast on November 25, 2010. The television special showcased the making of the album along with live performances on a rooftop in New York City. She also included the song as part of the set list of the Speak Now World Tour (2011–2012), performing it as the last song before the encore.

Swift performed "Long Live" on select dates of her later tours, including the Red Tour (Vancouver, June 2013), and the 1989 World Tour (Melbourne, third night, December 2015). On her Reputation Stadium Tour (2018), she performed a mashup of "Long Live" and "New Year's Day" (2017) on piano. Following the release of Speak Now (Taylor's Version) (2023), Swift added "Long Live" to the set list for the Eras Tour (2023–2024), from July 7, 2023 to March 9, 2024, as part of the Speak Now act; she also performed as part of a piano mashup with "You're on Your Own, Kid" (2022) during a Lisbon concert on May 25, 2024 and as part of a guitar mashup with "Change" (2008) during a London concert on August 19, 2024. Most recently, she performed a mashup of "Long Live", "New Year's Day" and "The Manuscript" (2024) on piano during the final show of the Eras Tour in Vancouver.

== Reception ==
After Speak Now was released, "Long Live" debuted and peaked at number 85 on the US Billboard Hot 100. In a review of Speak Now for Rolling Stone, Sheffield stated that it is "a ridiculously over-the-top prom anthem". He placed "Long Live" sixth on his list ranking all songs in Swift's discography, and called it "a song nobody else could have written, as she rides those power chords home". In BBC Music, Matthew Horton noted the track as an example of Swift's maturing songwriting. In a 2021 retrospective for Consequence, Natalia Barr picked "Long Live" as the best song from Speak Now; he lauded its anthemic production and lyrical sentiments and opined that the song "has only gotten better with time". PopMatters editor Dave Heaton compared the song favorably to "Change" from Fearless; he found "Long Live" somewhat generic, but that the ambiguity of its subject matter strengthened the song's appeal as an anthem. Spanos picked it among the 10 best deep cuts in Swift's discography and wrote: "Swift can make falling in love sound like every holiday is happening at once."

On a less positive side, Keefe believed that the high-school imagery showcased Swift's lack of repertoire in her songwriting. In her review for HitFix, Melinda Newman deemed "Long Live" too long and lyrically unsophisticated compared to the sharper lyricism of other tracks. Mikael Wood from Spin selected the song as one of Speak Now's most forgettable, alongside "Sparks Fly". NME's Hannah Mylrea, in a 2020 ranking of Swift's catalog, regarded "Long Live" as a generic filler on Speak Now.

== Paula Fernandes version ==
"Long Live" (remix)

Promotional single by Taylor Swift and Paula Fernandes

from the album Speak Now World Tour – Live
- Released: 3 January 2012
- Length: 5:17
- Songwriter: Taylor Swift: Paula Fernandes

Music video
- "Long Live" (remix) on YouTube

In 2012, Swift released a new version of "Long Live" featuring the Brazilian singer Paula Fernandes. It features Portuguese verses written and sung by Fernandes, and was released to promote the Brazilian edition of Swift's 2011 live album, Speak Now World Tour – Live, and was included in the soundtrack of the Brazilian soap opera Avenida Brasil. The version was made available on the Brazilian iTunes Store on January 3, 2012, through Universal Music Group.

The music video for the song, directed by Eduardo Levy, includes scenes of Fernandes singing the song in a studio in Brazil and Swift performing it during a U.S. concert. In Billboard, Taylor Weatherby praised Fernandes's deeper vocals complementing Swift's lighter tones. Swift and Fernandes performed the song live at a Rio de Janeiro concert held at Citibank Hall on September 13, 2012. The version featuring Fernandes reached the top five on Billboard Brasil's Hot 100 Airplay chart. "Long Live" was later included on Fernandes's studio album Meus Encantos (2012) as a bonus track, and her live album Multishow Ao Vivo: Um Ser Amor (2013).

== Charts ==
2011 chart performance
Chart (2011)	Peak position
US Billboard Hot 100	85
US Country Digital Song Sales (Billboard)	13

Chart performance for the Paula Fernandes version
Chart (2012)	Peak position
Brazil (Brasil Hot 100 Airplay)	5
Brazil (Brasil Hot Pop)	2

2024 chart performance
Chart (2024)	Peak position
Singapore (RIAS)	19

== Certifications ==
Certification
Region	Certification	Certified units/sales
Australia (ARIA)	Gold	35,000^{‡}
Brazil (Pro-Música Brasil)	4× Diamond	1,000,000^{‡}
^{‡} Sales+streaming figures based on certification alone.

== "Long Live (Taylor's Version)" ==
"Long Live (Taylor's Version)"

Song by Taylor Swift

from the album Speak Now (Taylor's Version)
- Released: July 7, 2023
- Studio: Blackbird (Nashville); Kitty Committee (London)
- Length: 5:17
- Label: Republic
- Songwriter: Taylor Swift
- Producers: Taylor Swift; Christopher Rowe

Lyric video
- "Long Live (Taylor's Version)" on YouTube

After signing a new contract with Republic Records, Swift began re-recording her first six studio albums in November 2020. The decision came after the public 2019 dispute between Swift and the talent manager Scooter Braun, who acquired Big Machine Records, including the masters of Swift's albums the label had released. By re-recording her catalog, Swift had full ownership of the new masters, including the copyright licensing of her songs, devaluing the Big Machine-owned masters.

A re-recorded version of "Long Live", titled "Long Live (Taylor's Version)", was released on July 7, 2023, via Republic Records as part of Speak Now (Taylor's Version), Swift's third re-recorded album.

=== Personnel ===
Adapted from Speak Now (Taylor's Version) digital album inline notes

- Taylor Swift – vocals, background vocals, songwriter, producer
- Christopher Rowe – producer, vocal engineer
- David Payne – recording engineer
- Lowell Reynolds – assistant recording engineer, editor
- Derek Garten – engineer, editor, programming
- Serban Ghenea – mixing
- Bryce Bordone – mix engineer
- Randy Merrill – mastering
- Matt Billingslea – drums, percussion
- Amos Heller – bass guitar
- Paul Sidoti – electric guitar
- Mike Meadows – acoustic guitar, Hammond B-3, background vocals
- Max Bernstein – electric guitar, synthesizer
- David Cook – piano
- Brian Pruitt – drum programming
- Caitlin Evanson – background vocals

=== Charts ===
Chart performance for Taylor's version
Chart (2023)	Peak position
Australia (ARIA)	53
Canada Hot 100 (Billboard)	58
Global 200 (Billboard)	55
Philippines (Billboard)	16
Singapore (RIAS)	29
UK Streaming (OCC)	99
US Billboard Hot 100	53
US Hot Country Songs (Billboard)	24

=== Certifications ===
Certification for Taylor's version
Region	Certification	Certified units/sales
Australia (ARIA)	Platinum	70,000^{‡}
New Zealand (RMNZ)	Gold	15,000^{‡}
United Kingdom (BPI)	Silver	200,000^{‡}
^{‡} Sales+streaming figures based on certification alone.
