= Change (Taylor Swift song) =

2008 song by Taylor Swift

Promotional single by Taylor Swift

from the album AT&T Team USA Soundtrack
- Written: December 2007
- Released: August 8, 2008
- Recorded: December 2007
- Genre: Power pop
- Length: 4:43
- Label: Big Machine
- Songwriter: Taylor Swift
- Producers: Taylor Swift; Nathan Chapman

Music video
- "Change" on YouTube

"Change (Taylor's Version)"

Song by Taylor Swift

from the album Fearless (Taylor's Version)
- Released: April 9, 2021
- Studio: Blackbird (Nashville); Prime Recording (Nashville)
- Length: 4:39
- Label: Republic
- Songwriter: Taylor Swift
- Producers: Taylor Swift; Christopher Rowe

Lyric video
- "Change (Taylor's Version)" on YouTube

"Change" is a song by the American singer-songwriter Taylor Swift, released on August 8, 2008, to promote the AT&T Team USA Soundtrack for the United States team at the 2008 Olympics. "Change" was included in Swift's second studio album, Fearless (2008). Swift wrote the track after winning the Horizon Award at the 2007 Country Music Association Awards; its lyrics are about overcoming obstacles to achieve victory.

Produced by Swift and Nathan Chapman, "Change" is a power pop song with dynamic strings and electric guitars. Music critics praised the production but found Swift's vocals weak and thin. The song peaked at number 10 on the Billboard Hot 100, number 21 on the Pop 100 chart, and number 57 on the Hot Country Songs chart. The Recording Industry Association of America (RIAA) certified the track gold. Shawn Robbins directed the music video for "Change" featuring Swift performing with a band in a ballroom. An alternate version features footage of the United States team at the 2008 Olympics.

Swift included "Change" in the set list to her first headlining tour, the Fearless Tour, in 2009 and performed the song live at the 45th Academy of Country Music Awards in 2010. After a 2019 dispute regarding the ownership of Swift's back catalog, she released a re-recorded version, "Change (Taylor's Version)", on Fearless (Taylor's Version), the 2021 re-recorded version of Fearless.

== Background and release ==
When Taylor Swift first signed to Big Machine Records, it was the smallest record label in Nashville, Tennessee. At some point, Swift realized that it would be more difficult for her to achieve success through a small label, than in a larger label, constricting their contacts and making it nearly impossible to embark on concert tours and have presenter or performer slots on award shows. In addition, as the only signed artist, she could not ask for favors and only had herself to encourage the hope that scenarios would eventually change. Swift described the scenario as an "uphill climb" and said, "There was this moment where I sat there and was like, 'When are we going to get a fighting chance? We're the smallest record label in Nashville, but we want this really bad.'" After reassuring to herself that it would be different in the future, she wrote the beginning of "Change". She let the track sit for a while, waiting for a remarkable event to trigger its completion. She then completed the track the day after she won the Horizon Award at the 2007 Country Music Association Awards and saw Scott Borchetta, the president of Big Machine Records, crying.

The song was recorded in December 2007, when she recognized it applied to more scenarios and had a "bigger meaning" than originally. American television network National Broadcasting Company (NBC) had asked Swift to perform at the 2008 Summer Olympics in Beijing, China. However, an appearance could not be scheduled because Swift was touring at the time. Instead, Swift's father suggested using "Change" as a theme for the event. Therefore, "Change" was used during NBC's daily video highlights in August 2008, prior to the release of Fearless. "I wrote the song 'Change' as an underdog story. It's kind of crazy to think that the Olympics chose this as one of the songs to play during the Olympic Games", Swift commented. It was included on the AT&T Team USA Soundtrack (2008). The song was released as a promotional single on the iTunes Store on August 8, 2008. All proceeds were donated to the United States Olympic team.

After its digital release, "Change" was included on the track list of Swift's second studio album, Fearless, released on November 11, 2008. Following a masters dispute, Swift released the re-recorded version of Fearless, subtitled Taylor's Version, on April 9, 2021; Fearless (Taylor's Version) includes the re-recorded "Change", also subtitled "Taylor's Version". "Change (Taylor's Version)" was produced by Swift and Christopher Rowe.

== Composition and reception ==
At 4 minutes and 46 seconds long, "Change" is a power pop song instrumented by distorted electric guitars and swelling strings. The lyrics of "Change" speak of overcoming obstacles and achieving triumph, while instilling hope in oneself. It centers around the concept of surpassing others' expectations and the limitations they set out. The song turns the notion of fearlessness into a movement that is not specified. Dave Heaton of PopMatters noted the lyric "I believe in whatever you do" meant Swift was unconcerned with the specifics of the cause. He presumed it was a universal message or was about changing the traditions of country music sound and defying the expectations of what country artists can achieve with their careers. Jody Rosen of Rolling Stone believed the lyrics were "vaguely political".

The song received generally mixed reviews from contemporary critics. Jonathan Keefe of Slant Magazine was unimpressed by Swift's vocals, describing them as unpleasant and thin. Keefe added that her voice often cracked and, therefore, prevented the song from becoming an anthem. Heaton compared "Change" and Swift's "Long Live", both which ended Fearless and Speak Now (2010), respectively. He stated, "There's something really generic about the song[s], but that quality becomes the cornerstone of an anthem." Heaton also commented that the song was appealing to multiple audiences, as long as they felt restrained by any scenario.

On the week ending August 30, 2008, "Change" debuted at its peak position of number 10 on the Billboard Hot 100, selling over 131,000 digital downloads, making it Swift's best-charting song at the time and first top-10 appearance. In the following week, the song descended to number 39 and then number 100 on the Hot 100, marking its third and last week on the chart. The song is one of 13 tracks from Fearless to chart within the top 40 of the Hot 100, breaking the record for the most top-40 entries from a single album. "Change" also peaked at number 57 on the Hot Country Songs chart on the week ending August 30, 2008. The track also peaked at number 21 on the now-defunct Pop 100 chart.

== Music video ==
The accompanying music video for "Change" was directed by Shawn Robbins. It was filmed at the ballroom in the Scottish Rite Cathedral in Indianapolis, Indiana. The video commences with a shot of a stained glass window. It then transitions to Swift, clothed in a white cocktail dress and black cowboy boots, performing alongside her backup band in an empty ballroom. The band members are dressed semi-casual and play the instruments: bass, drums, and various guitars. As the video progresses, Swift is seeing singing and dancing. Cut-scenes feature close-ups of Swift in another setting, clothed by another white cocktail dress and surrounded by hot pink, white, and blue twinkling lights in a black background. The video concludes with Swift turning back and walking toward the backup band. An alternate version of the video features footage from United States Olympic team at the 2008 Summer Olympics. Both versions of the music video premiered on NBC.com in August 2008.

== Live performances ==
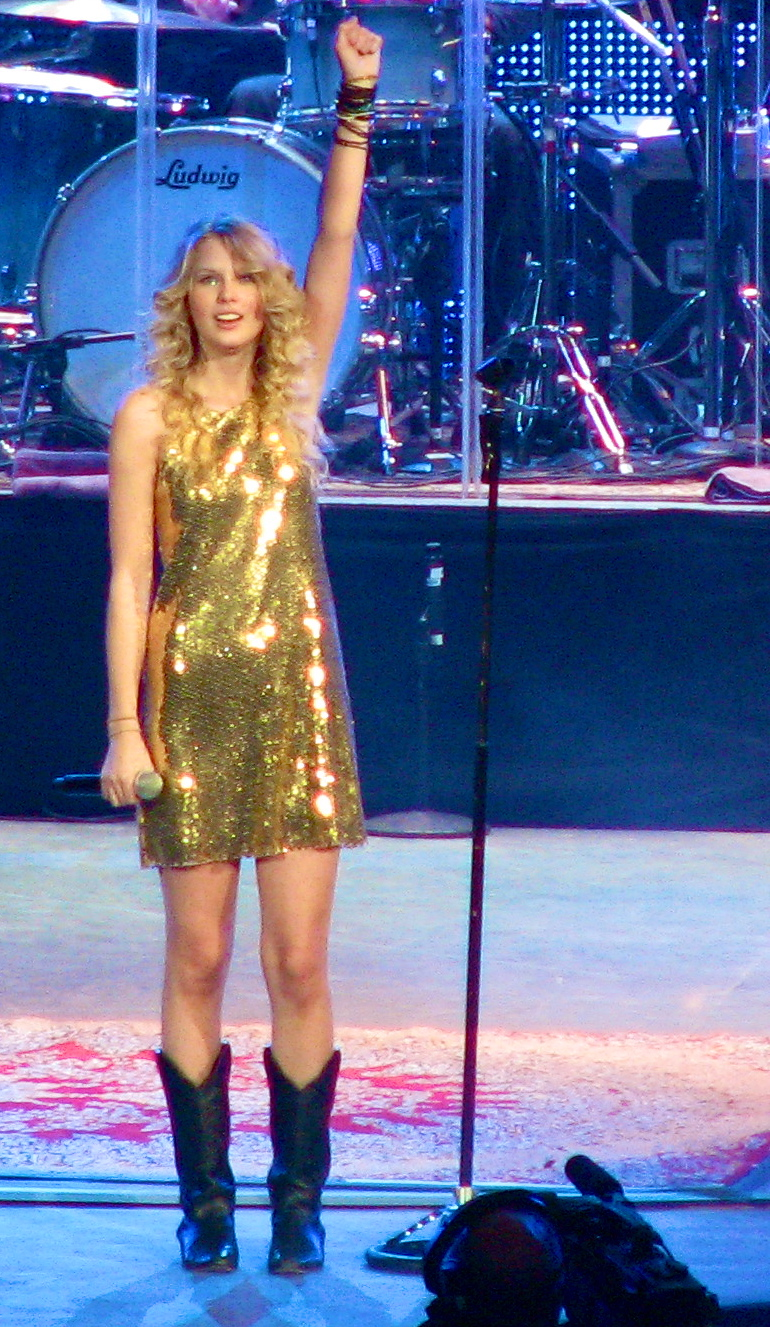
Swift performing "Change" in the Houston Rodeo

Swift has performed the track on the AOL Sessions. Since, Swift has performed the track at the Studio 330 Sessions, the 2009 CMA Music Festival, the 2009 V Festival, and the Australian charity concert Sydney Sound Relief. Swift's first televised performance of "Change" was at the 2010 Academy of Country Music Awards, where she, donning a sparkly evening gown, sang on an elevator suspended from the crowd. She then did a quick outfit change to a black ensemble, came down, where she was joined by a teenage choir, and finished the performance by surfing the crowd.

Swift performed "Change" on the first North American leg of the Fearless Tour. During the performances, Swift wore a sparkly silver and black dress with black, leather boots. She noted, "It's been a tough year", and commenced singing throughout the stage as images of victims of economic and natural disasters were projected on the video screens. As the song approximated, its last refrain, she said, "Things turn back around." Then, scenes of triumph appeared on the video screens. Craig Rosen of The Hollywood Reporter attended the May 22, 2009 concert in Los Angeles, California at the Staples Center and commented, "It was overly simplistic and a bit naive, but still hard not to be moved." Jon Pareles of The New York Times said Swift offered the audience with optimistic thinking with the performance in the August 27, 2009 concert at Madison Square Garden in New York City. She performed the song in 2013 during the performance in Greensboro on her Red Tour, at the second show in Foxborough on her Reputation Stadium Tour in 2018, and at the seventh show in London on her The Eras Tour, in 2024 in a mashup with "Long Live" (2010).

== Charts ==
Chart performance
Chart (2008)	Peak position
US Billboard Hot 100	10
US Pop 100 (Billboard)	21
US Hot Country Songs (Billboard)	57

== Certification ==
Certification
Region	Certification	Certified units/sales
United States (RIAA)	Gold	500,000^{*}
^{*} Sales figures based on certification alone.
