= Back to December =

2010 single by Taylor Swift

Single by Taylor Swift

from the album Speak Now
- Released: November 15, 2010
- Genre: Country pop; power ballad
- Length: 4:53
- Label: Big Machine
- Songwriter: Taylor Swift
- Producers: Taylor Swift; Nathan Chapman

Taylor Swift singles chronology
| "Mine" (2010) | "Back to December" (2010) | "Mean" (2011) |

Music video
- "Back to December" on YouTube

"Back to December" is a song written and recorded by the American singer-songwriter Taylor Swift for her third studio album, Speak Now (2010). Big Machine Records released it as the album's second single on November 15, 2010. Produced by Swift and Nathan Chapman, "Back to December" is a country pop song and a power ballad that incorporates a string section. Inspired by Swift's relationship with the actor Taylor Lautner, the lyrics are about a remorseful plea for forgiveness from a former lover.

In contemporary reviews, music critics praised "Back to December" for its production and the mature lyrics expressing regret over lost love. Several critics have considered it one of Swift's best songs. In the United States, the single peaked at number six on the Billboard Hot 100 and number three on the Hot Country Songs chart, and the Recording Industry Association of America certified it triple platinum. Elsewhere, "Back to December" peaked at number seven in Canada and received certifications in Australia, Brazil, Canada, and the United Kingdom.

The song's music video, directed by Yoann Lemoine, depicts the aftermath of a breakup between Swift and her boyfriend. Swift performed "Back to December" at the Country Music Association Awards and the American Music Awards. On the Speak Now World Tour (2011–2012), she performed the song as part of a medley with OneRepublic's "Apologize" and her song "You're Not Sorry". A re-recorded version, titled "Back to December (Taylor's Version)", was released as part of Swift's third re-recorded album, Speak Now (Taylor's Version), on July 7, 2023. The re-recorded song topped the Philippines Songs chart.

== Background and release ==
Swift wrote her third studio album, Speak Now (2010), entirely by herself. According to Swift, Speak Now is a collection of songs about the things she had wanted to say to the people in her life, but never had a chance to. "Back to December" is an apology to a past lover in the form of a song, something that she had never done before. In press interviews leading up to the release of Speak Now, Swift said that although her past songs usually criticized her ex-boyfriends, she felt the need to apologize to a person who was nice to her: "Guys get what they deserve in my songs, and if they deserve an apology, they should get one. There was someone who was absolutely wonderful to me and I dropped the ball, and I needed to say all that."

"Back to December" was produced by Swift and Nathan Chapman. It was first released as a promotional single from Speak Now on October 12, 2010, as a part of the exclusive campaign by the iTunes Store leading up to the album's release. On November 15, 2010, the song was released to US country radio by Big Machine Records, as the second single from Speak Now. Around the time of its release, the inspiration behind the song was subject to media scrutiny, because of Swift's dating history with other celebrities. In press interviews, Swift refused to reveal the subject of the song, as well as other Speak Now tracks, because she wanted to focus on the songwriting aspect of her work. The actor Taylor Lautner, an ex-boyfriend of Swift, told the press in 2016 that he was the inspiration of "Back to December".

== Composition ==
"Back to December"
A sample of "Back to December", showing the song's use of orchestral strings in the refrain. The power ballad combines country and pop and has lyrics about the narrator apologizing to an ex-lover for having hurt him.

"Back to December" has a length of 4 minutes and 55 seconds. Musically, it is a power ballad. In contemporary reviews, critics categorized the ballad as country and pop. The song incorporates an orchestral arrangement consisting of strings, recorded at Capitol Studios in Los Angeles. It is one of the three Speak Now tracks to incorporate orchestral strings, the other two being "Haunted" and "Enchanted". Maura Johnston from Vulture described the song's texture as "a chilly day when the sun goes down too soon and the mind can only turn to past regrets". Clash opined that the production is "wintry" with "soft flourishes of guitar and strings". In the Los Angeles Times, Martens Todd found the song borderline 1980s rock.

In the lyrics, the narrator apologizes to an ex-lover for having hurt him. The lyrics lament a failed relationship that could have been special, "It turns out freedom ain't nothing but missing you / Wishing I'd realized what I had when you were mine." The narrator reminisces about the last time she saw the ex-lover, "You gave me roses, and I left them there to die." She wishes to go back in time to change her mind, "I'd go back to December, turn around, and change my own mind / I go back to December all the time." In the bridge, the narrator attempts to fix uncovered memories and change where she went wrong, but ultimately realizes that it is too late.

Billboard journalist Lyndsey Havens wrote of the lyrics, "To hear Swift declare and own a previous mistake was both comforting and empowering all at once — and proved that it's OK, and sometimes even necessary, to swallow one's pride in the name of love." Mandi Bierly from Entertainment Weekly described the song as "a melancholy mea culpa with the kind of driving chorus and age-appropriate yet universal honesty". Leah Greenblatt from the same publication deemed the lyric "Your guard is up and I know why, because the last time you saw me is still burned in the back of your mind / You gave me roses and I left them there to die" one of the most outstanding lyrics from Speak Now.

== Critical reception ==
"Back to December" received widespread critical acclaim. Rob Sheffield from Rolling Stone gave it a positive review commenting, "Swift's voice is unaffected enough to mask how masterful she has become as a singer; she lowers her voice for the payoff lines in the classic mode of a shy girl trying to talk tough." Jonathan Keefe from Slant Magazine complimented Swift's ability "to write an indelible melody" and praised the production of the song, writing "[the song] showcase(s) Swift's unique knack for matching the overall tone of a melody to the broader themes of a song". He added that "it isn't easy to make a melancholy song like "Back to December" sound catchy at the same time, but that's what Swift does, and it's an impressive trick."

Rudy Klapper from Sputnikmusic described the song as a "regret-filled apology". In The Washington Post, Allison Stewart picked it as one of the album's "great" songs. Dan DeLuca, writing for The Philadelphia Inquirer, considered "Back to December" the Speak Now track that most showcased Swift's maturing songwriting, thanks to the lyrics depicting her acknowledgements of her own shortcomings without blaming others. Steven Hyden, in a review for The A.V. Club, was less enthusiastic, deeming "Back to December" a generic ballad and saying that it is not as effective as other album tracks where Swift criticizes those who had wronged her, such as "Innocent", "Better than Revenge", or "Mean".

Retrospectively, Johnston selected "Back to December" as one of the most memorable tracks on the album, deeming it a wistful song and praising the emotional sentiments: "Swift's lyrics slip between in-the-moment narration and getting lost in her head in an utterly relatable way." James Rettig, in a 10-year anniversary review of Speak Now for Stereogum, found it to represent Swift "at her best" for portraying universal feelings about "lost love and youthful regret" despite taking inspiration from her own personal life. Clash's editors included the single in their list of the 15 best songs by Swift, with Sahar Ghadirian specifically lauding the bridge. On a less complimentary side, Alexis Petridis of The Guardian ranked "Back to December" 39th in his 2019 ranking of Swift's 44 singles; while saying that the song is "beautifully produced", he remarked that it "never quite sets your pulse racing".

== Commercial performance ==
Upon its digital release, "Back to December" debuted and peaked at number six on the US Billboard Hot 100 with first-week digital sales of 242,000 downloads. On the Hot Country Songs chart, the single peaked at number three. On other airplay charts by Billboard, "Back to December" peaked at number 11 on Pop Songs, number 11 on Adult Pop Songs, and number 14 on Adult Contemporary. According to the Billboard Year-End Charts of 2011, "Back to December" ranked at number 38 on the year-end Hot Country Songs and number 74 on the year-end Hot 100 chart. As of November 2017, "Back to December" had sold two million digital copies in the United States. Elsewhere, the single peaked at number seven on the Canadian Hot 100, number 26 on the Australian ARIA Charts, and number 24 on the Official New Zealand Music Chart.

== Music video ==
=== Development and concept ===
The music video for "Back to December" was directed by Yoann Lemoine, and was filmed in late December 2010 before Christmas Day. In an interview with Country Music Television, Lemoine explained that he developed the idea for the video after being inspired from the 1982 film E.T. the Extra-Terrestrial. He also told MTV News that he wanted it to be simple yet metaphorical, adding, "I wanted to work on the coldness of feelings in a very visual way, playing with the snow, the distance and sadness." He wanted to focus on Swift's look in the video so that she would come off as accessible, saying "I wanted her to perform a very natural way, to make her look very European. This was the main challenge to me. All of Taylor's world is very far away from my culture, but I saw something in her that could be very rough and heartbreaking; far from the princess glittery outfits and glam that she often goes for." Lemoine was allowed to take control of the whole production of the video, although it was Swift's idea to have her character leave the letter for her beloved. Swift's love interest in the video was played by the model Guntars Asmanis. Lemoine commented that Asmanis was the perfect fit for Swift's love interest, saying "I wanted a boy that was fragile and beautiful. I didn't want to go for a hunk or a perfect cheesy boy that would have killed the sincerity of the video." The outdoor scenes were filmed in Binghamton, New York (including footage of the school and stadium at MacArthur Park) and neighboring Vestal, New York, while scenes with Swift were shot in an old country mansion outside of Nashville.

The music video premiered on January 13, 2011, on Country Music Television and Great American Country. It begins with a young man seen walking alone in a small town to the snowy football field in a winter morning. The video cuts to Swift inside a house wearing a comfy sweater draped over one shoulder. She is brooding and singing about her lost love while wandering morosely around her house. She is also seen sitting in the bathtub, missing her boyfriend who she didn't treat well when they were together. About halfway through the video, it starts to snow inside the spacious house. A montage of Swift writing a letter is shown alternately with scenes of her boyfriend strolling around the town. It is then revealed that the whole situation is the aftermath of a break-up between Swift and her boyfriend. It is also shown that Swift slips the letter that she has written in his coat pocket before he leaves. The final scene shows her ex-boyfriend sitting in the bleachers of the snowy football field, reading her apology letter.

=== Reception ===
Critical receptions towards the music video were generally positive. Jillian Mapes of Billboard believed that the video was "appropriately understated" considering the fact that the song is all about making an apology. Kyle Anderson from MTV argued that it puts Swift in a "pantheon of modern classics" with regards to its "almost haunting visual sense" which makes up for the inadequate narrative. Leah Collins of Dose called the music video "dreamy and moody". Leah Greenblatt of Entertainment Weekly similarly deemed it "kind of lovely", which corresponds with the melancholic yet regretful mood of the song. Joycelyn Vena from MTV said that the video was "darker" and "somber", something that is not synonymous with Swift. The Oxonian Review considered Swift's "listlessness, the bare trees, and snowy indoors" in the music video attuned to the tenor of the song, achieved by "mixing wide shots, medium close ups, and cut-ins of Ms. Swift and her ex, matching their gazes across frames, and blurring focus tastefully."

The Improper Bostonian said that the video has "the look and feel of a Hallmark movie and is almost as maudlin". Amos Barshad of New York described it as "terrible", and Tamar Anitai from MTV regarded it as "a bummer", writing, "it isn't just about a girl with her calendar permanently stuck on the twelfth month of the year. It's not just about feeling like a Lady Antebellum song. It's about getting stuck in a place of romantic regret."

== Awards and nominations ==
Awards and nominations
| Year | Organization | Award/work | Result | Ref. |
|---|---|---|---|---|
| 2011 | American Country Awards | Female Video of the Year | Nominated | |
| 2011 | BMI Awards | Publisher of the Year | Won | |
| 2011 | BMI Awards | Award-Winning Songs | Won | |
| 2011 | Teen Choice Awards | Choice Break-Up Song | Won | |

== Live performances ==
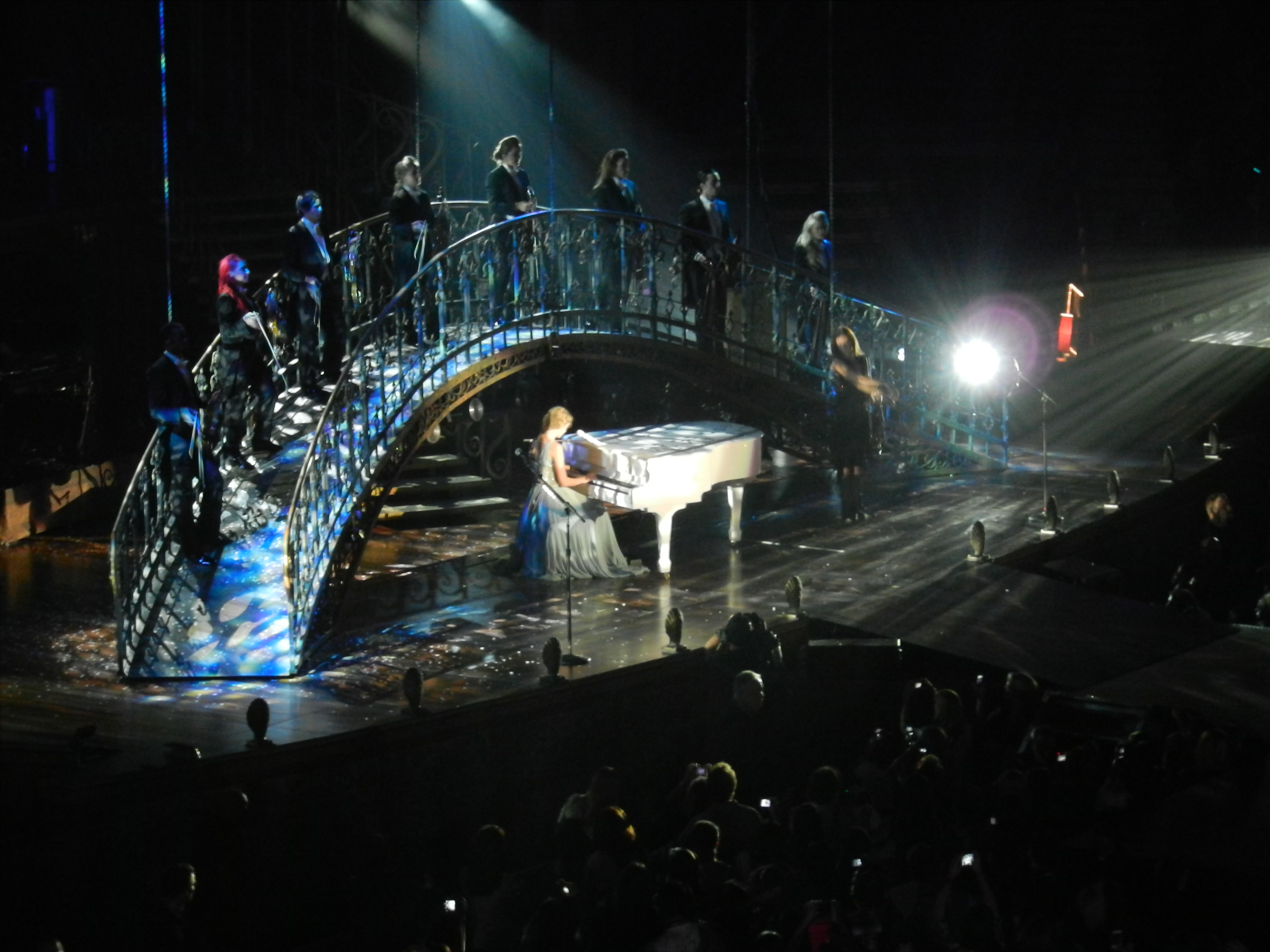
Swift singing "Back to December" on a piano, backed by an orchestra, on the Speak Now World Tour in 2011

Swift first performed "Back to December" in Paris at a showcase at the Salle Wagram theater, on October 18, 2010, to promote Speak Now a week before its release. Swift also performed the song on Speak Now: Taylor Swift Live From New York City, a special programme which was streamed live on CMT.com, MTV.com, VH1.com and other MTV websites in Europe, Asia, Australia and Latin America to celebrate the release of the album.

Swift also performed "Back to December" on several other occasions. On November 10, 2010, she performed the song live at the 44th annual Country Music Association Awards at Bridgestone Arena in Nashville. Her performance of the song during that event was graded as a "B+" in the Los Angeles Times, noting she "kept it simple" and "rose to the occasion". On November 21, 2010, Swift mashed "Back to December" with OneRepublic's "Apologize" at the 38th American Music Awards. Her rendition in the event was graded as a "B−" in the Los Angeles Times, noting that the mashup "seemed unnecessary".

Swift performed "Back to December" on November 24, 2010, during Thanksgiving night, on NBC. She later performed the song on The Ellen DeGeneres Show on December 2, 2010. On January 31, 2011, she sang the song in JetBlue's Terminal 5 in New York City as part of the JetBlue's Live at Terminal 5 concert series. She included the song on her Speak Now World Tour, performing it in a medley with "Apologize" and her song "You're Not Sorry". The performance was recorded and released as part of Swift's live album Speak Now: World Tour Live. On the July 15, 2023, concert in Denver, as part of the Eras Tour, Swift sang "Back to December" as a "surprise song".

== Charts ==
=== Weekly charts ===
Weekly chart performance
| Chart (2010–2011) | Peak position |
|---|---|
| Australia (ARIA) | 26 |
| Canada Hot 100 (Billboard) | 7 |
| Canada CHR/Top 40 (Billboard) | 34 |
| Canada Country (Billboard) | 5 |
| Canada Hot AC (Billboard) | 29 |
| Japan (Japan Hot 100) | 62 |
| Japan Adult Contemporary (Billboard) | 27 |
| New Zealand (Recorded Music NZ) | 24 |
| US Billboard Hot 100 | 6 |
| US Adult Contemporary (Billboard) | 14 |
| US Adult Pop Airplay (Billboard) | 11 |
| US Hot Country Songs (Billboard) | 3 |
| US Pop Airplay (Billboard) | 11 |

=== Year-end charts ===
Year-end chart performance
| Chart (2011) | Position |
|---|---|
| US Billboard Hot 100 | 74 |
| US Adult Contemporary (Billboard) | 30 |
| US Adult Pop Songs (Billboard) | 42 |
| US Hot Country Songs (Billboard) | 38 |

== Certifications ==
Certifications and sales
| Region | Certification | Certified units/sales |
|---|---|---|
| Australia (ARIA) | 2× Platinum | 140,000^{‡} |
| Brazil (Pro-Música Brasil) | Platinum | 60,000^{‡} |
| Canada (Music Canada) | Gold | 40,000^{*} |
| New Zealand (RMNZ) | Platinum | 30,000^{‡} |
| United Kingdom (BPI) | Silver | 200,000^{‡} |
| United States (RIAA) | 2× Platinum | 2,000,000^{‡} |
^{*} Sales figures based on certification alone.^{‡} Sales+streaming figures based on certification alone.

== Release history ==
Release dates and formats
| Country | Date | Format | Label | Ref. |
|---|---|---|---|---|
| Worldwide | October 12, 2010 | Digital download | Big Machine | |
| Worldwide | November 15, 2010 | Country radio | Big Machine | |
| Worldwide | November 30, 2010 | Contemporary hit radio | Big Machine; Republic | |
| United Kingdom | March 20, 2011 | Digital download | Universal | |

== "Back to December (Taylor's Version)" ==
"Back to December (Taylor's Version)"

Song by Taylor Swift

from the album Speak Now (Taylor's Version)
- Released: July 7, 2023
- Studio: Blackbird Studio (Nashville); Kitty Committee Studio (London); The EBC (London); Prime Recording (Nashville)
- Length: 4:54
- Label: Republic
- Songwriter: Taylor Swift
- Producers: Taylor Swift; Christopher Rowe

Lyric video
- "Back to December (Taylor's Version)" on YouTube

After signing a new contract with Republic Records, Swift began re-recording her first six studio albums in November 2020. The decision came after the public 2019 dispute between Swift and the talent manager Scooter Braun, who acquired Big Machine Records, including the masters of Swift's albums the label had released. By re-recording her catalog, Swift had full ownership of the new masters, including the copyright licensing of her songs, devaluing the Big Machine-owned masters. Her first two re-recordings, Fearless (Taylor's Version) and Red (Taylor's Version), were released in April and November 2021, respectively.

On May 5, 2023, at the first Nashville show of the Eras Tour, Swift announced Speak Now (Taylor's Version) as her next re-recorded album, slated for release on July 7, with "Back to December (Taylor's Version)" as the third track of the record. On June 29, a snippet of "Back to December (Taylor's Version)" was featured in the trailer to the second season of the Prime Video original series, The Summer I Turned Pretty. The re-recording was recorded in Nashville at Prime Recording Studios and Blackbird Studio, and in London at the Kitty Committee Studio and The EBC Studios.

=== Personnel ===
Adapted from Speak Now (Taylor's Version) digital album inline notes

Production

- Taylor Swift – producer
- Christopher Rowe – producer, vocal engineer
- David Payne – recording engineer
- Lowell Reynolds – assistant recording engineer, editor
- Derek Garten – engineer, editor, programming
- Serban Ghenea – mixing
- Bryce Bordone – mix engineer
- Randy Merrill – mastering

Musicians

- Taylor Swift – vocals, background vocals, songwriter
- Amos Heller – bass guitar
- Paul Sidoti – acoustic guitar, electric guitar
- Mike Meadows – acoustic guitar, Hammond B-3, mandolin, background vocals
- Max Bernstein – electric guitar, synth pads
- Jeremy Murphy – string recording
- London Contemporary Orchestra – strings
  - Galya Bisengalieva, Zahra Benyounes, Natalie Kloudak, Charlotte Reid, Anna Ovsyanikova, Antonia Kesel, Eloisa-Fleur Thom, Anna de Bruin, Charis Jenson, Guy Button, Nicole Crespo O'Donoghue, Nicole Stokes – violin
  - Zoe Matthews, Clifton Harrison, Matthew Kettle, Stephanie Edmundson – viola
  - Oliver Coates, Jonny Byers, Max Ruisi – cello
  - Dave Brown – double bass

=== Charts ===
Chart performance for Taylor's version
| Chart (2023) | Peak position |
|---|---|
| Australia (ARIA) | 11 |
| Canada Hot 100 (Billboard) | 17 |
| Global 200 (Billboard) | 10 |
| Greece (IFPI) | 52 |
| Ireland (Billboard) | 17 |
| Malaysia (Billboard) | 12 |
| Malaysia International (RIM) | 5 |
| New Zealand (Recorded Music NZ) | 10 |
| Philippines (Billboard) | 1 |
| Singapore (RIAS) | 4 |
| UK Streaming (OCC) | 30 |
| US Billboard Hot 100 | 16 |
| US Hot Country Songs (Billboard) | 5 |
| Vietnam (Vietnam Hot 100) | 55 |

=== Certifications ===
Certification for Taylor's version
| Region | Certification | Certified units/sales |
|---|---|---|
| Australia (ARIA) | Gold | 35,000^{‡} |
| Brazil (Pro-Música Brasil) | Gold | 20,000^{‡} |
| New Zealand (RMNZ) | Gold | 15,000^{‡} |
| United Kingdom (BPI) | Silver | 200,000^{‡} |
^{‡} Sales+streaming figures based on certification alone.
