= Speak Now World Tour – Live =

2011 live video album by Taylor Swift

Live album by Taylor Swift
- Released: November 21, 2011
- Recorded: 2011
- Genres: Country pop; pop rock
- Length: 79:03
- Label: Big Machine
- Director: Ryan Polito
- Producer: Taylor Swift

Taylor Swift chronology
Speak Now (2010)	Speak Now World Tour – Live (2011)	Red (2012)

Speak Now World Tour – Live is the first live album by the American singer-songwriter Taylor Swift. It was released on November 21, 2011, through Big Machine Records. The physical copy consists of an audio CD and a visual accompaniment on DVD and Blu-ray. Recorded on Swift's Speak Now World Tour, which she embarked on to support her third studio album Speak Now, the live album consists of songs and performances on various dates.

The 16-track CD is made up of live recordings of all Speak Now tracks on the standard edition save for two—"Never Grow Up" and "Innocent"—and the deluxe edition track "Ours". Additionally, it includes three covers of pop songs of other artists—"Drops of Jupiter" (Train), "Bette Davis Eyes" (Kim Carnes), and "I Want You Back" (the Jackson 5). Swift's single "Back to December" was performed as part of a medley with OneRepublic's "Apologize" and her own "You're Not Sorry" from her 2008 album Fearless. The DVD or Blu-ray contains bonus performances of Swift's other songs not from Speak Now and video recordings of Swift's rehearsals for the tour and personal life.

In Brazil, Speak Now World Tour – Live was supported by the digital single "Long Live" featuring the Brazilian singer Paula Fernandes, which reached the top 10 on the Brasil Hot 100 Airplay chart. Music critics praised the live album for showcasing Swift's stage persona and showmanship, but considered it too long and took issue with her live vocals as weak and strained. In the United States, the album peaked at number 11 on the Billboard 200 and had sold 368,000 copies by July 2019. Speak Now World Tour – Live additionally entered the top 30 on charts in Australia, where it was certified triple platinum, as well as in Greece, Canada, and Japan.

== Background and release ==
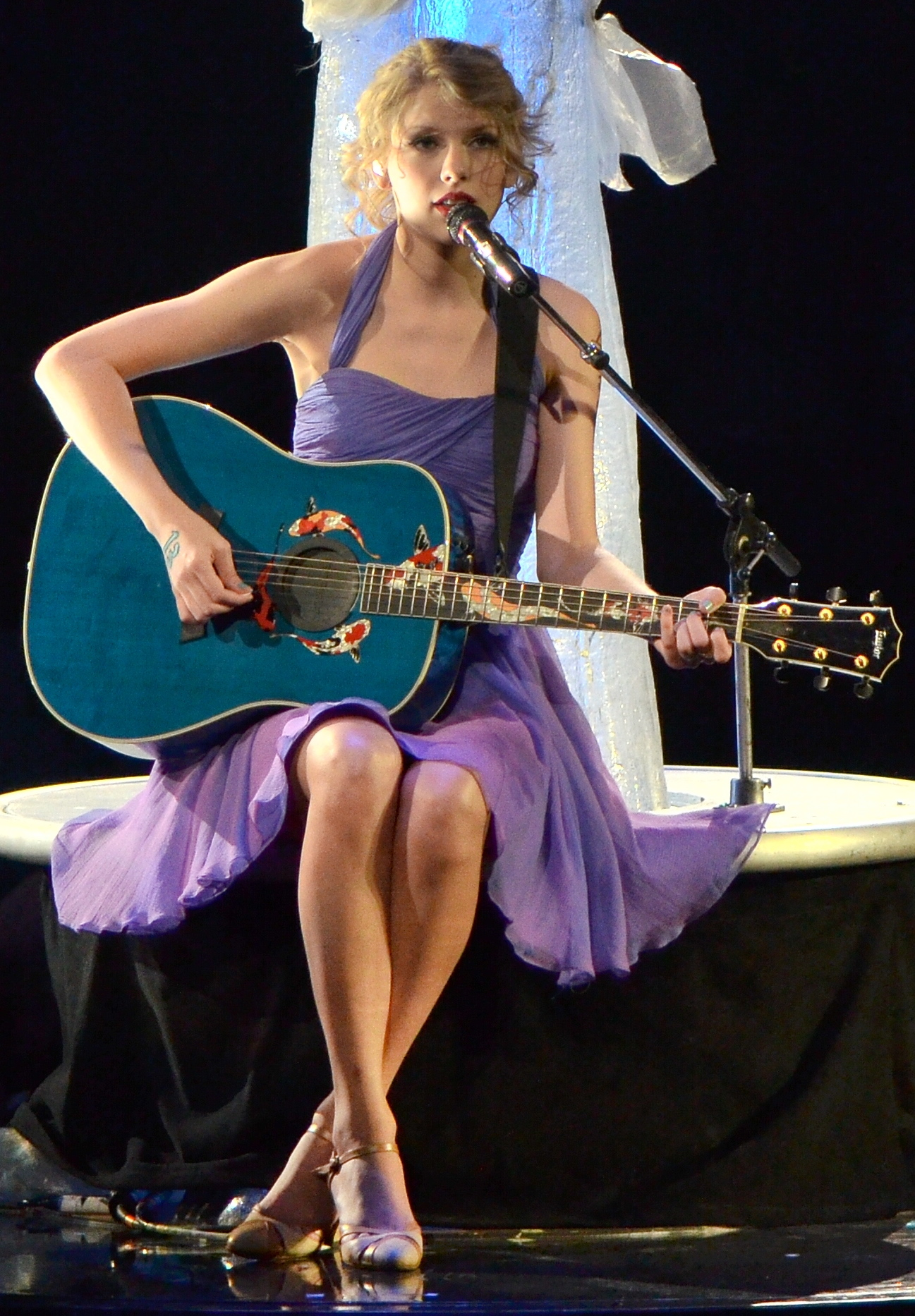
Swift on the Speak Now World Tour in Newark, New Jersey, July 2011

In October 2010, Taylor Swift released hеr third studio album, Speak Now. She quickly followed with the Speak Now World Tour, which started in February and wrapped its North American leg in November 2011. By December 2011, the album had sold 3.7 million copies, and the tour had attracted 1.3 million concertgoers. Swift's management team at Big Machine Records decided to release a live album to accompany the tour because of its profitability. According to the management team leader Jim Weatherson, "We've sold out virtually every show. [...] We know there's got to be a gap between 1.3 million tickets and 3.7 million albums. We felt we could create a wonderful piece for people to either relive the concert or experience what it was all about." On Swift's part, she told Billboard that she wanted to capture the tour on DVD because she would like to look back at it in the future": "Every single night I stand on that stage and it feels like it's the best crowd of the tour every night. They are so loud and emotional and so passionate, and [...] I want to look back on this years from now and show it to my kids and my grandkids."

Swift announced Speak Now World Tour – Live, her first live album, and its cover artwork via her official website on September 21, 2011. The live album was marketed as country music, aligning with Swift's self-identity as a country-music artist. The DVD and Blu-ray releases feature all seventeen performances from the North American leg of the Speak Now World Tour, as well as bonus content. The CD has over seventy-five minutes of music as well as select live performances of songs from the Speak Now album. The combo was released on November 21, 2011, via Big Machine Records in North America. It was released in Australia on November 25, and other territories on November 28. In the United States, Swift partnered with American Greetings Corporation for a holiday promotion where contest winners won a copy of Speak Now World Tour – Live.

In the United States, a Walmart-exclusive release contained a promotional CD single of "Ours", a track on Speak Now's deluxe edition. Meanwhile, a Target-exclusive edition contains bonus DVD material consisting of bonus performances of the songs "Ours", "Nashville" by David Mead, and "The Sweet Escape" by Gwen Stefani; and behind-the-scenes footage of the music video for "Mean". Many of the songs and performances were captured from various legs around the world of the tour. The Brazilian release of the album contains a new studio version of the song "Long Live", featuring new verses in Portuguese, composed and sung by the Brazilian singer Paula Fernandes. The track was released for download in January 2012, accompanied by a music video. The version peaked at number five on the Brasil Hot 100 Airplay chart.

== Content ==
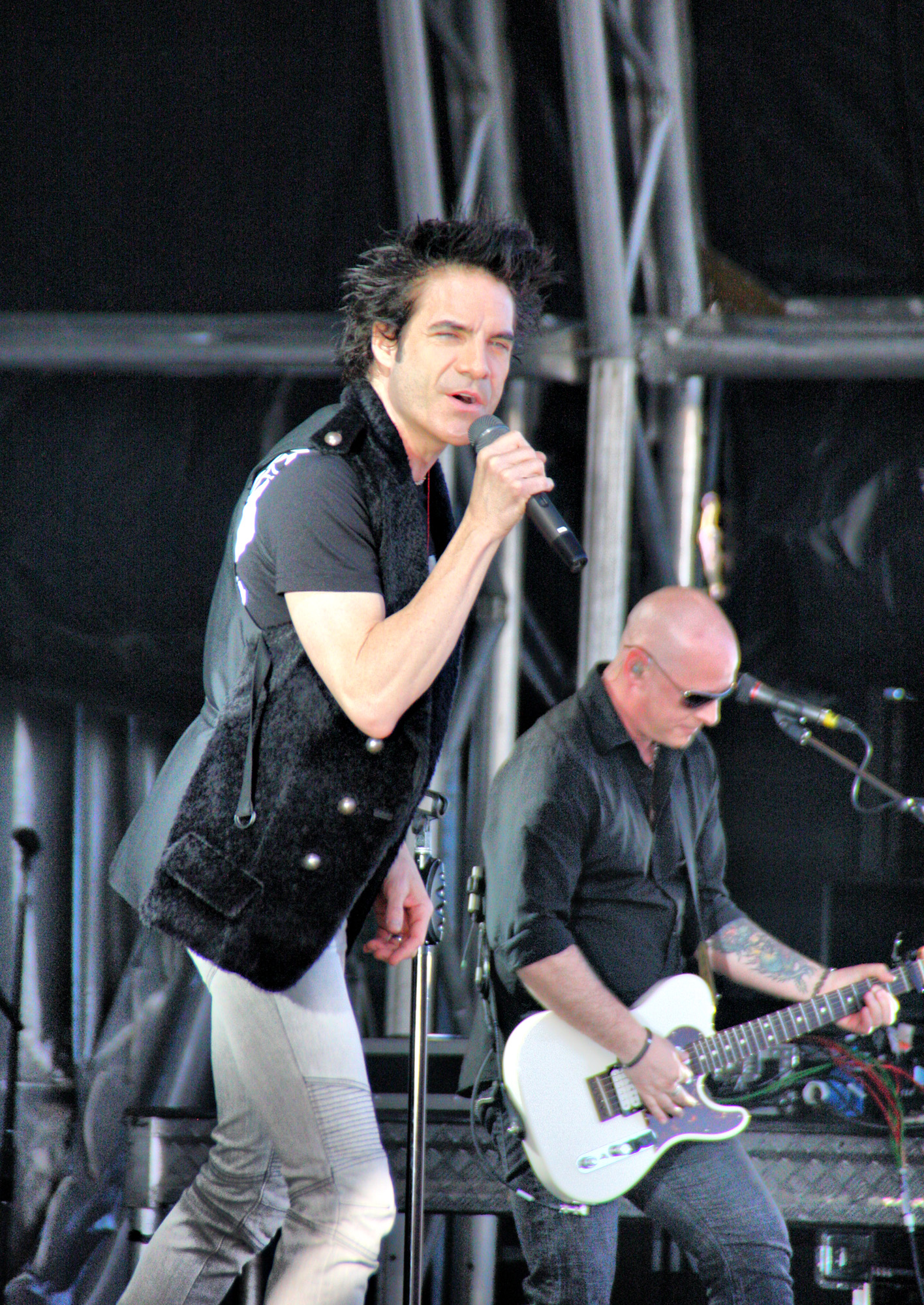
In addition to Swift's material, the live album includes two covers of Train (frontman Pat Monahan pictured).

Speak Now World Tour – Live is a set of CD and DVD; it consists of 16 tracks on the CD and 18 on the DVD, alongside bonus behind-the-scenes footage and videos of Swift's personal life. The CD runs for 79 minutes, and the DVD two hours. The 16-track CD consists of live recordings of all tracks on the standard edition of Speak Now, save for two—"Never Grow Up" and "Innocent"; a live recording of the deluxe edition track "Ours"; and three covers of songs by other artists—"Drops of Jupiter" (Train), "Bette Davis Eyes" (Kim Carnes), and "I Want You Back" (the Jackson 5). Swift's live recording of "Back to December" is part of a medley with two other songs: OneRepublic's "Apologize" and her own "You're Not Sorry" from her 2008 studio album Fearless. Music critics described Speak Now World Tour – Live as country pop and pop rock. Slant Magazine's Jonathan Keefe said that despite Swift's self-identity as a country musician, her music instead "leans far more heavily on massive pop-rock power chords and sing-along choruses" that suited the live arenas where Swift performed.

The DVD features bonus performances of songs from other albums by Swift—"Our Song", "You Belong with Me", "Fifteen", and "Love Story". The DVD recording of Swift's "Fearless" is part of a medley with Train's "Hey Soul Sister" and Jason Mraz's "I'm Yours". In addition, it also contains home videos and footage of Swift's rehearsals for the tour. Recorded on numerous shows from the Speak Now World Tour, the DVD performances showcase elaborate stage settings, choreography, backup dancers and band, and Swift's numerous costume changes. In AllMusic, James Christopher Monger said that the film "more closely resembled a high-profile Broadway musical than it did a country music concert".

The DVD starts with Swift performing "Sparks Fly" in a fringed golden dress as aerialists dangle from the rafters. She sings the tracks, "Mean" and "Our Song", on a banjitar alone, in front of a porch setting resembling the American countryside. For the performance of "Speak Now", which has lyrics about a protagonist interrupting a wedding, Swift is dressed in a royal blue dress, ponytail, and short white gloves, and performs girl group-styled choreography with colorful dressed backup dancers; another backup dancer plays a bride in a puffy gown. Swift then sings "Fearless" / "Hey Soul Sister" / "I'm Yours" on ukulele sitting under a glowing tree. Taylor also performs "Last Kiss" with her koi fish guitar, followed by Train's Drops of Jupiter. before leading into "You Belong With Me", which takes her back through the crowd back to the stage, finishing up YBWM before going into "Dear John", which she performs sitting on the stairs. The performance of "Enchanted" is accompanied by ballet dancers, whereas "Haunted" features Swift hurling herself at a bell. The last song before the encore is "Long Live", and the concert closes with "Fifteen" and "Love Story". During the performance of "Love Story", Swift sings on a floating balcony across the venue as glitter falls across the venue.

== Critical reception ==
Professional ratings
Review scores
Source	Rating
AllMusic	3/5 stars
Daily Breeze	3/5 stars
The Newcastle Herald	4.5/5 stars
Rolling Stone	3.5/5 stars
Roughstock	3/5 stars
Slant Magazine	3/5 stars
The Straits Times	3/5 stars

In a review for Roughstock, Matt Bjorke said Speak Now World Tour – Live might not appeal to those who had not been fans of Swift already, but appreciated her for improving live vocals. Jonathan Keefe in Slant Magazine found the covers of Train and OneRepublic awkward, criticized Swift's live vocals as weak and off-key, and considered the live album's impact unsubstantial because it "may not add anything to an already solid set of songs on a narrative level". Keefe nonetheless praised it for showing Swift's "one-of-us authenticity" and songwriting that strongly resonated with her audience.

In The Straits Times, Yeow Kai Chai similarly took issue with Swift's vocals as weak and off-key, and found the covers, such as "I Want You Back" and "Drops of Jupiter", forgettable. Yeow nonetheless appreciated Swift's stage persona: "Her sincerity and pretty girl-next-door smarts redeem every cookie-cutter confessional." The Daily Breeze journalist Sam Gnerre, on the contrary, deemed the covers the highlights. Gnerre found the CD rather "typical", but praised the DVD for showcasing Swift's showmanship, "her remarkable mix of youthful energy and seasoned skill". The Oklahoman's Brandy McDonnell praised the DVD and found the covers entertaining but said that "Ours" was disappointing and Swift's vocals were uneven. Jon Dolan of Rolling Stone lauded the content of the DVD but found the CD and bonus behind-the-scenes material redundant. Dolan commented that the best moments are where Swift performs alone with her guitar.

In The Newcastle Herald, Heather Williams similarly lauded Swift's artistry and called her "a great role model and musician". In The Gold Coast Bulletin, Bob Anthony wrote: "it's clear Swift knows how to put on a show. And while she may not be a country music purist's cup of tea, there are thousands of tweenies out there who would love nothing more than to have this collection in their collection." Carlos Olivares Baró in a review for Mexican media agency Notimex lauded the stage and selected the performances of "Sparks Fly", "Mean", "Speak Now", "Last Kiss", and "Long Live" as standouts.

== Commercial performance ==
Speak Now World Tour – Live debuted at number eleven on the US Billboard 200 chart with 77,000 copies sold first-week. It also debuted at number two on the Top Country Albums chart, the highest debut of the week. As of July 2019, the album has sold 368,000 copies in the US. The album peaked at number 16 on the Australian albums chart and entered the top 30 on albums charts in Canada and Japan. In Australia, it additionally peaked atop the country-music albums chart, and the DVD, which peaked at number five, was certified triple platinum by the Australian Recording Industry Association (ARIA) in 2014. Two of the tracks appeared on charts. The live recording of "Drops of Jupiter" peaked at number seven on the Bubbling Under Hot 100 Singles chart, number 22 on the Country Digital Song Sales chart, and number 74 on the Hot Canadian Digital Songs chart. The medley "Back to December / Apologize / You're Not Sorry" also peaked at number 45 on the Country Digital Song Sales chart.

In the United Kingdom, Speak Now World Tour – Live initially peaked at number 14 on the Official Charts Company's UK Music Video Chart in 2011. In 2023, the live album resurged in popularity and peaked atop the UK Music Video Chart dated July 30, 2023.

== Track listing ==
All tracks are written by Taylor Swift, except where noted.

Speak Now – World Tour Live audio track listing
No.	Title	Writer(s)	Length
1.	"Sparks Fly"		5:39
2.	"Mine"		4:19
3.	"The Story of Us"		4:49
4.	"Mean"		4:09
5.	"Ours"		4:05
6.	"Back to December / Apologize / You're Not Sorry"	Swift; Ryan Tedder	6:01
7.	"Better than Revenge"		5:44
8.	"Speak Now"		4:09
9.	"Last Kiss"		6:12
10.	"Drops of Jupiter"	Charlie Colin; Rob Hotchkiss; Pat Monahan; Jimmy Stafford; Scott Underwood	5:08
11.	"Bette Davis Eyes"	Jackie DeShannon; Donna Weiss	3:07
12.	"I Want You Back"	Berry Gordy Jr.; Alphonso Mizell; Freddie Perren; Deke Richards	1:21
13.	"Dear John"		6:45
14.	"Enchanted"		6:25
15.	"Haunted"		4:49
16.	"Long Live"		6:21
Total length:			1:19:03

Brazilian edition bonus track (disc 2)
No.	Title	Writer(s)	Length
1.	"Long Live" (featuring Paula Fernandes)	Swift; Fernandes	5:16
Total length:			1:24:19

Speak Now – World Tour Live video track listing
No.	Title	Writer(s)	Length
1.	"Sparks Fly"		7:27
2.	"Mine"		4:19
3.	"The Story of Us"		8:02
4.	"Our Song"		8:11
5.	"Mean"	Swift; Tedder	5:26
6.	"Back to December / Apologize / You're Not Sorry"		7:43
7.	"Better than Revenge"		5:45
8.	"Speak Now"		8:08
9.	"Fearless / Hey, Soul Sister / I'm Yours"	Swift; Liz Rose; Hillary Lindsey; Amond Bjorklund; Espen Lind; Monahan; Jason Mraz	5:53
10.	"Last Kiss"		9:10
11.	"Drops of Jupiter"	Stafford; Underwood; Monahan; Colin; Hotchkiss	5:13
12.	"You Belong with Me"	Swift; Rose	7:40
13.	"Dear John"		6:43
14.	"Enchanted"		8:59
15.	"Haunted"		6:33
16.	"Long Live"		8:01
17.	"Fifteen"		7:16
18.	"Love Story"		8:46
19.	"Home Movies"		5:05
20.	"Rehearsal of the Speak Now World Tour"		5:09
Total length:			2:19:29

Target edition DVD
No.	Title	Writer(s)	Length
17.	"Ours"		5:36
18.	"Fifteen"		7:16
19.	"Love Story"		8:46
20.	"Nashville"	David Mead	5:57
21.	"The Sweet Escape"	Gwen Stefani; Aliaune Thiam; Giorgio Tuinfort	3:22
22.	"On the Set with Taylor Swift: Mean"		20:43
23.	"Home Movies"		5:05
24.	"Rehearsal of the Speak Now World Tour"		5:09
Total length:			2:55:07

== Personnel ==
Credits adapted from AllMusic

=== Musicians ===
- Taylor Swift – lead vocals, rhythm guitar, acoustic guitar, banjo, piano, ukulele
- David Cook – keyboards
- Caitlin Evanson – fiddle, backing vocals, acoustic guitar
- Jody Harris – rhythm guitar
- Amos Heller – bass guitar
- Liz Huett – backing vocals
- Mike Meadows – backing vocals, banjo, rhythm guitar, mandolin
- Grant Mickelson – lead and rhythm guitar
- Paul Sidoti – lead and rhythm guitar, keyboards, backing vocals
- Al Wilson – drums
- Daniel Sadownick – percussion

=== Production ===
- Taylor Swift – art direction, director, lighting design, producer, set design
- Chris Adams – editing
- Robert Allen – executive producer, mixing
- Charity Baroni – dancer
- Shannon Beach – dancer
- Brent Bishop – assistant engineer
- C.J. Boggs – engineer
- Scott Borchetta – executive producer
- Justin Boulet – dancer
- Claire Callaway – dancer
- David Cook – musical director
- Justin Cortelyou – mixing
- Paula Erickson – liner notes
- Emily Evans – art direction
- Sharon Everitt – colorist, editing
- Bob Ezrin – mixing
- Thomas Freitag – assistant engineer
- Grant Garner – liner notes
- Derek Garten – assistant engineer
- Christie Goodwin – photography
- Olivier Goulet – video director
- Austin Hale – design
- Baz Halpin – director, lighting design, set design
- Greg Hancock – engineer
- Dom Kelley – dancer
- Justin Key – art direction
- Glenn Meadows – mastering
- Fernando Miro – dancer
- Joe Neil – engineer
- Bethany Newman – design
- Josh Newman – design
- Marlyn Ortiz – dancer
- Meredith Ostrowsky – dancer
- David Payne – engineer
- Ryan Polito – director
- Aaron Rayburn – design
- Garth Richardson – engineer
- Chris Rowe – engineer, mixing
- Joel Schwamburger – assistant engineer
- Jennifer Spenelli – editing assistant
- Andrea Swift – executive producer
- Austin Swift – photography
- Ben Terry – assistant engineer
- Brian Virtue – mixing
- Jim Weatherson – art direction, executive producer

== Charts ==
=== Weekly charts ===
2011–2012 weekly chart performance for Speak Now World Tour – Live
Chart (2011–2012)	Peak position
Australian Albums (ARIA)	16
Australian Country Albums (ARIA)	1
Australian Music DVDs (ARIA)	5
Canadian Albums (Billboard)	25
Japanese Albums (Oricon)	28
Mexican Albums (Top 100 Mexico)	67
South Korean Albums (Circe)	96
Spanish Albums (Promusicae)	91
UK Music Videos (Official Charts)	14
US Billboard 200	11
US Top Country Albums (Billboard)	2

2023–2026 weekly chart performance for Speak Now World Tour – Live
Chart (2023–2026)	Peak position
Irish Music DVDs (IRMA)	1
Greek Albums (IFPI)	3
Portuguese Albums (AFP)	150
UK Official DVD Chart (OCC)	42
UK Music Videos (Official Charts)	1

=== Year-end charts ===
2011 year-end chart performance for Speak Now World Tour – Live
Chart (2011)	Position
Australian Music DVDs (ARIA)	46

2012 year-end chart performance for Speak Now World Tour – Live
Chart (2012)	Position
US Billboard 200	100
US Top Country Albums (Billboard)	21

== Certifications ==
Certifications for Speak Now World Tour – Live
Region	Certification	Certified units/sales
Australia (ARIA)	Gold	35,000^{‡}
Australia (ARIA) DVD	3× Platinum	45,000^{^}
^{^} Shipments figures based on certification alone.^{‡} Sales+streaming figures based on certification alone.
