= Dear John letter =

Relationship termination letter usually sent to military personnel deployed

A Dear John letter is a letter written to a man by his wife or romantic partner to inform him that their relationship is over, usually because she has found another lover. The man is often a member of the military stationed overseas, although the letter may be used in other ways, including being left for him to discover when he returns from work to an emptied house.

== Origin and etymology ==
While the exact origins of the phrase are unknown, it is commonly believed to have been coined by Americans during World War II. "John" was the most popular and common name for boys in the United States every year from 1880 through 1923, making it a reasonable placeholder name when denoting those of age for military service. Large numbers of American troops were stationed overseas for many months or years, and as time passed, some of their wives or girlfriends began relationships with other men. One of the earliest known Dear John letters was written by Agnes von Kurowsky to Ernest Hemingway in 1919.

As letters to servicemen from wives or girlfriends back home would typically contain an affectionate greeting (such as "Dear Johnny", "My dearest John", or simply "Darling"), a serviceman receiving a note beginning with a curt "Dear John" when accustomed to a warmer greeting would instantly be aware of the letter's purpose.

A mid-war reference to Dear John letters was made in a United Press article of March 21, 1944.

A writer in the Democrat and Chronicle of Rochester, New York, summed it up in August 1945:

"Dear John," the letter began. "I have found someone else whom I think the world of. I think the only way out is for us to get a divorce," it said. They usually began like that, those letters that told of infidelity on the part of the wives of servicemen... The men called them "Dear Johns".

It has been claimed that the Vietnam War inspired more Dear John letters than any other U.S. conflict. This type of letter formed the background to the British television show Dear John, as well as the American sitcom Dear John.

Various online sources cite a war tale Dear John letters as the source for the phrase "that's all she wrote", which means "there is nothing left to say". As the tale goes, while some soldiers received letters several pages long, one soldier received a letter that only said "Dear John", and that's all she wrote. The opening words had said it all, hence the meaning of the phrase.

== See also ==
- Love letter
- The Blue Gardenia, a 1953 film noir driven by a Dear John letter
- Dear John, a 2010 romantic war drama film
- "Dear John" (Taylor Swift song)
- "Dear John" (Hank Williams song)
- "Dear John" (Status Quo song)
- "A Dear John Letter" (Jean Shepard and Ferlin Husky song)
- Military mail
- Dear John Letter to a 5-year Prisoner of War on the day of his release.
- Dear John (American TV series)
- Dear John (British TV series)
