= Speak Now World Tour =

2011–2012 concert tour by Taylor Swift

- Tour by Taylor Swift
- Promotional poster for the tour in 2011
- Location: Asia; Europe; North America; Oceania
- Associated album: Speak Now
- Start date: February 9, 2011
- End date: March 18, 2012
- No. of shows: 110
- Supporting acts: The JaneDear Girls; Needtobreathe; Frankie Ballard; Danny Gokey; Hunter Hayes; Randy Montana; James Wesley; Charlie Worsham; Adam Brand; David Nail; Hot Chelle Rae; Sezairi Sezali; Sam Concepcion; Tom Dice; Emma Marrone; Ryan Sheridan; Johnny Saito; Martin & James; The Bright
- Attendance: 1,642,435
- Box office: $123.7 million ($173.47 million in 2025 dollars)

Taylor Swift concert chronology
- Fearless Tour (2009–2010); Speak Now World Tour (2011–2012); The Red Tour (2013–2014)

The Speak Now World Tour was the second concert tour by the American singer-songwriter Taylor Swift, in support of her third studio album, Speak Now (2010). It began in Singapore, on February 9, 2011, and concluded in Auckland, New Zealand, on March 18, 2012. Visiting Asia and Europe before kicking off in North America on May 27, 2011, the tour covered 110 shows across 19 territories.

The set list consisted mostly of songs from Speak Now, with a few numbers from Swift's first two albums, Taylor Swift (2006) and Fearless (2008). "Back to December" was performed as a mashup with "You're Not Sorry" and OneRepublic's "Apologize", and "Fearless" with Train's "Hey, Soul Sister" and Jason Mraz's "I'm Yours". The stage decorations featured Broadway-inspired elements such as lighting, choreography, and costume changes. On several US shows, Swift invited special guests to perform duets onstage with her. Multiple shows were recorded for a concert film and live album, both titled Speak Now World Tour – Live, released on November 21, 2011.

Music critics generally praised the production and Swift's showmanship and interactions with her audience. The North American shows were met with high demand that led to tickets being sold out within minutes. According to Pollstar, the Speak Now World Tour was both the highest-grossing by a female and solo artist and the fourth overall of 2011; in North America, it was the year's second-highest-grossing tour. Billboard ranked it fifth on their list of the top tours of 2011, with estimated total gross of $123.7 million and attendance of 1.6 million.

== Background and development ==
Big Machine Records released Taylor Swift's entirely self-written third studio album, Speak Now, on October 25, 2010. Speak Now sold over one million copies after one week of release in the United States, leading The New York Times to comment that Swift "has transcended the limitations of genre and become a pop megastar".

To promote the album, Swift planned to embark on a world tour. Immediately after the album's release, she announced on CMT that she had finalized the first tour dates in Japan in February 2011, followed by Norway, Germany, France, Spain, and the United Kingdom in March. Prior to an official concert tour, Swift had headlined festivals worldwide, including the V Festival in the United Kingdom and the CMC Rocks the Snowys in Australia in 2009, and the Summer Sonic Festival in Japan in summer 2010.

The tour was sponsored by CoverGirl, of which Swift became the brand's face in 2011.

On November 23, 2010, Swift officially announced the Speak Now World Tour as her second headlining concert tour, following the Fearless Tour (2009). This announcement revealed the first 87 scheduled shows in 19 countries; the tour was to kick off in Asia, visiting territories including Singapore, Japan, South Korea, Hong Kong, and the Philippines, in February and then visited Europe in March, before taking place in North America from May until October 2011, kicking off in Omaha on May 27. Needtobreathe was confirmed as the opening act for the North American shows in December 2010.

In March 2011, Swift announced 16 additional dates for the North American leg, which was sponsored by CoverGirl and produced and promoted by The Messina Group (a partner of AEG Live), extending its run until November 2011. Additional opening acts included Frankie Ballard, Danny Gokey, Hunter Hayes, Josh Kelley, Randy Montana, James Wesley, Charlie Worsham, Adam Brand, and David Nail. The final dates of the Speak Now World Tour were for Australia and New Zealand, which were announced for March 2012. Hot Chelle Rae was confirmed as the opening act for the Australasian shows shortly prior to their commencement.

== Concert synopsis ==
Each concert in the North American leg lasted nearly two hours. Most songs on the set list were from Speak Now, with a few being from Swift's first two studio albums, Taylor Swift (2006) and Fearless (2008). Swift used Tom Petty and the Heartbreakers's "American Girl" (1977) as her entrance song prior to the show. Each concert incorporated a range of aesthetic decorations and visual elements, including large video screens, elaborate lighting systems, pyrotechnics, set changes, confetti, a satellite stage, and nine costume changes. Swift said that these stage elements were inspired by her favorite Broadway plays like Wicked that she saw in her childhood.

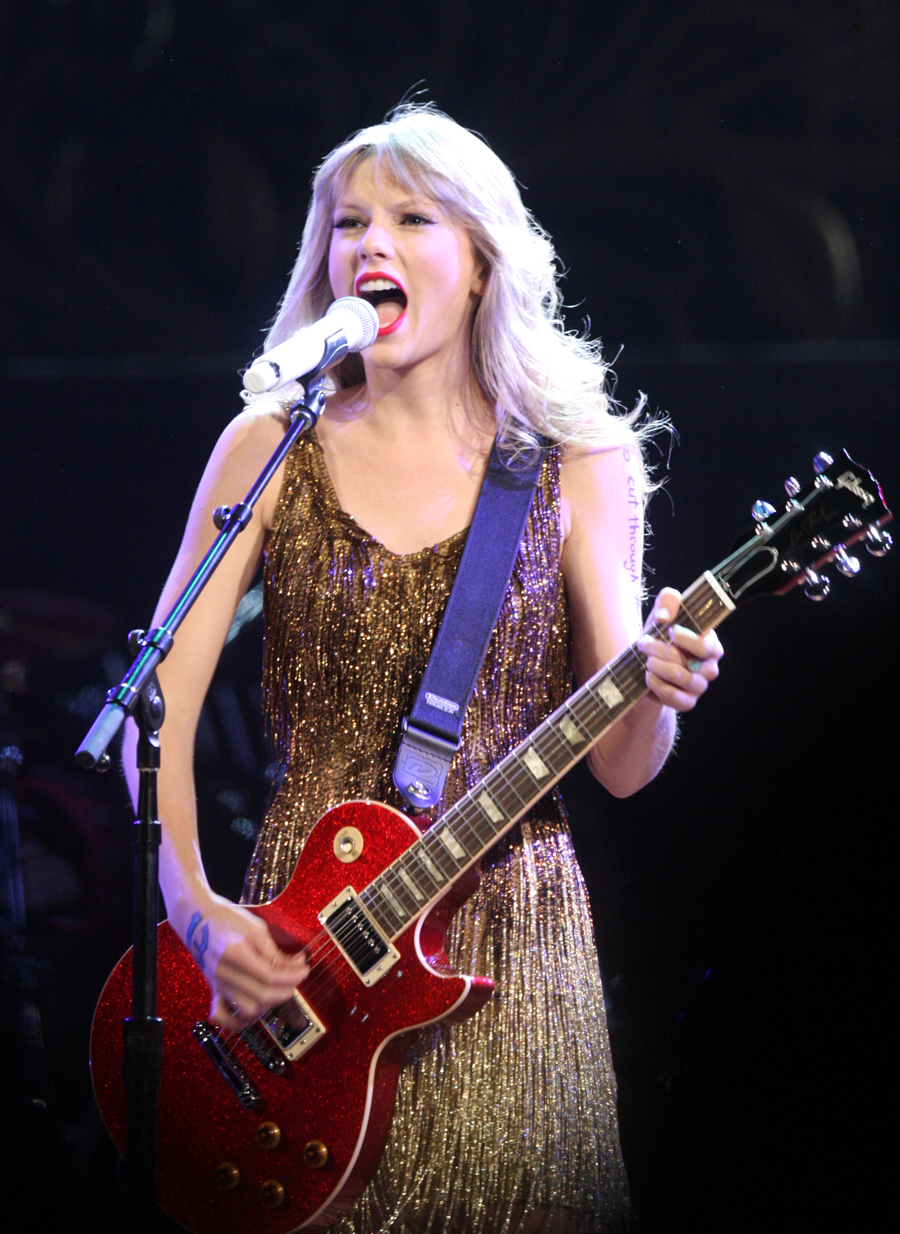
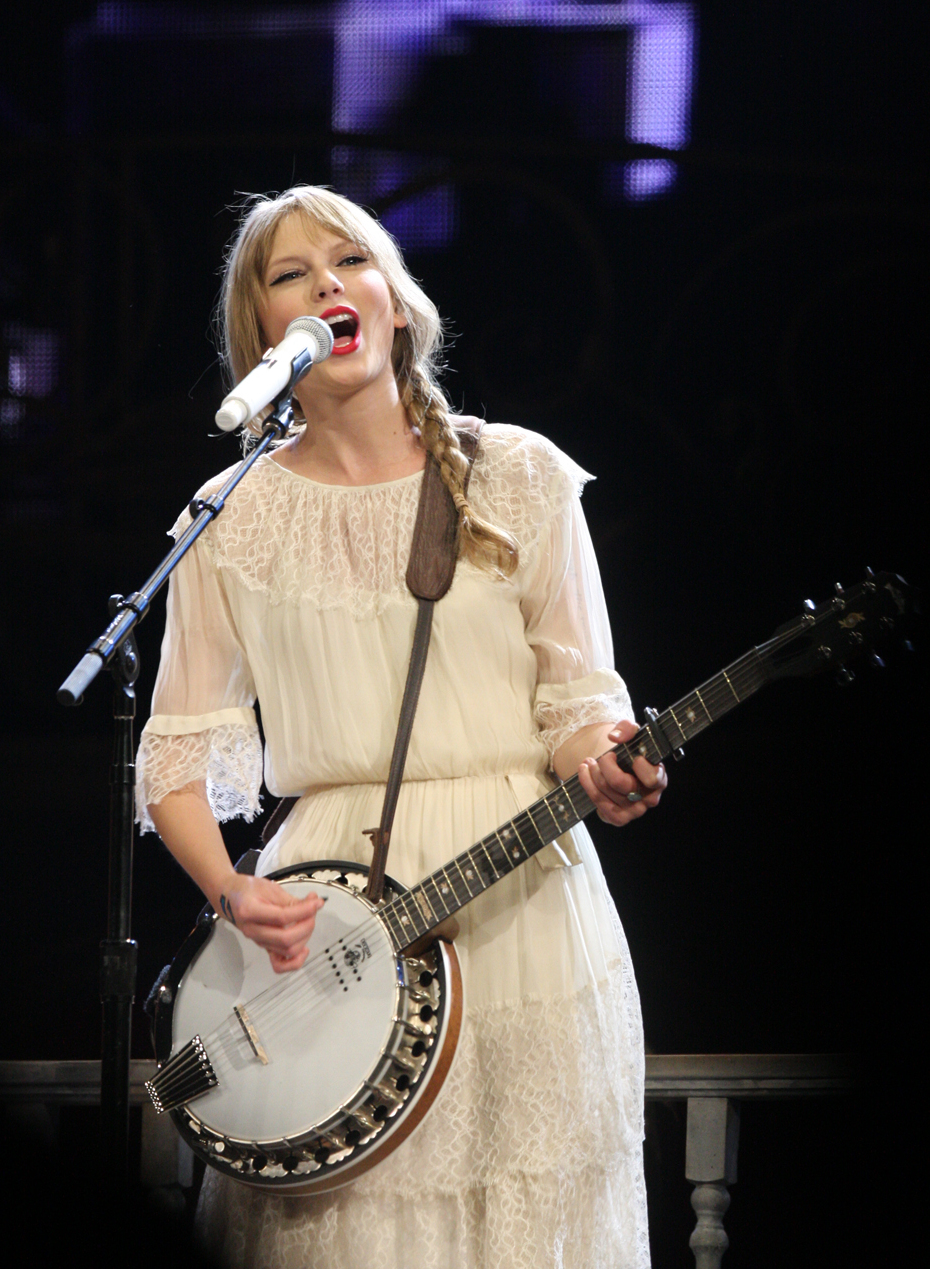
Swift played a red electric guitar to sing "Mine" (left) and a banjo-guitar to sing "Our Song" (right).

The show began with Swift's recorded voice saying, "There's a time for silence and a time for waiting your turn. But if you know how you feel and you so clearly know what you need to say, you'll know it. I don't think you should wait, I think you should Speak Now." Swift then appeared onstage amidst thick fog, dressed in a gold-fringed dress and black boots, and performed the opening number, "Sparks Fly", with her band playing on a three-staircase stage. She sang the second number, "Mine", playing a red Les Paul electric guitar as her band members also strummed guitars. She paused to greet the audience before resuming the show with the third song, "The Story of Us".

For the next numbers, "Our Song" and "Mean", the stage setting incorporated imagery of an American back porch to complement the songs' country sounds. Swift performed these songs playing a banjo-guitar, while a band member played a fiddle and dancers acted out using washboards, goats, and moonshine. The stage scenery then changed to a snow-covered one, with tuxedo-wearing dancers performing a choreography on a bridge that was lowered onto the stage as Swift, donning a long gown, sang "Back to December" in a mashup with "You're Not Sorry" and OneRepublic's "Apologize" while playing a baby grand piano, backed by nine violinists. It was followed by a performance of "Better than Revenge", which began with a voicemail saying, "Leave me a message and make it hot." Swift then appeared onstage in a red sequined mini-dress and cowboy boots, singing the song while standing on the bridge and play-fighting with a backup dancer. The number ended with an electric guitar solo that made room for Swift to disappear from the stage.

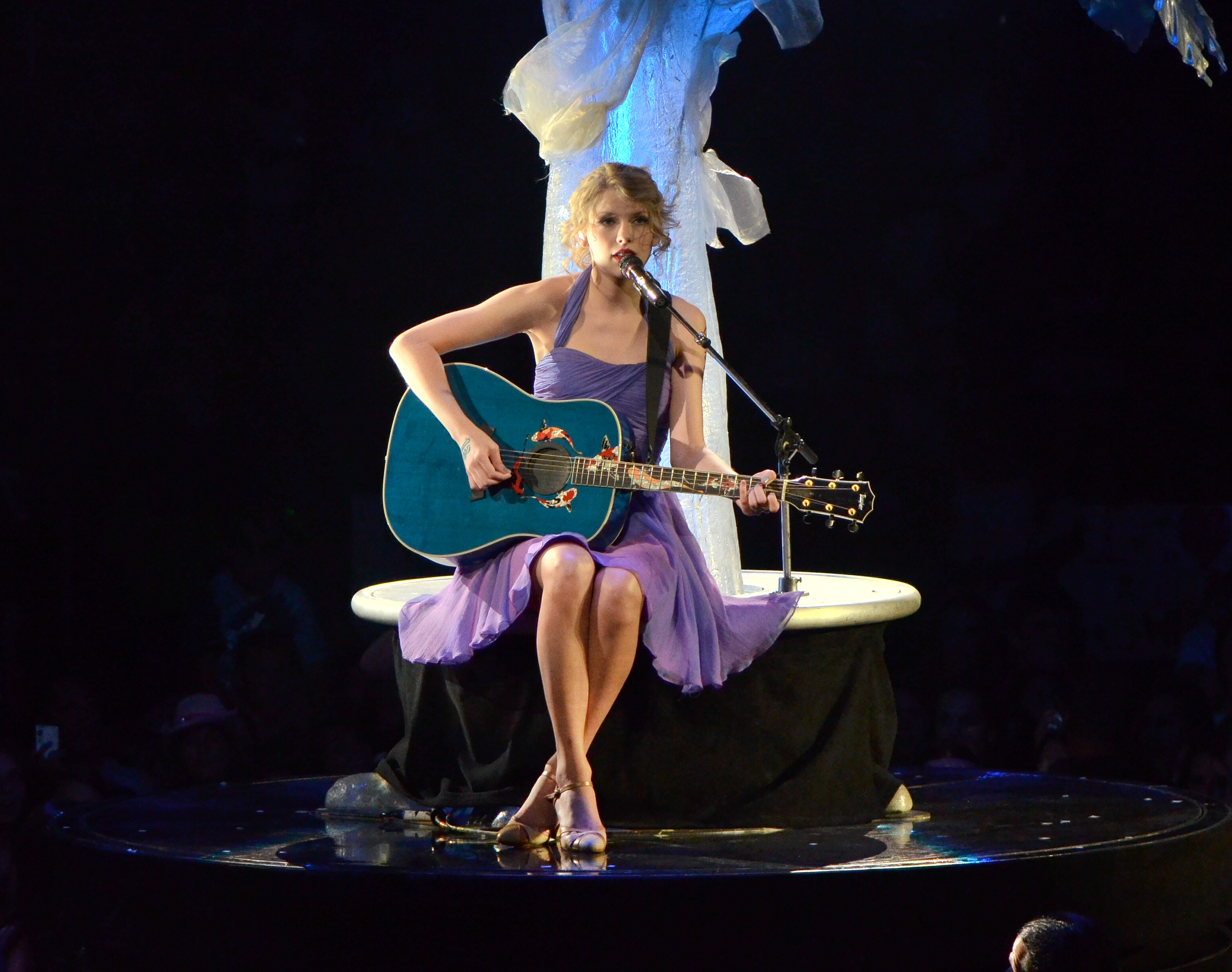
Swift played an acoustic guitar and sang "Last Kiss" under an illuminated tree.

The next number was "Speak Now", for which the stage was decorated to resemble a wedding ceremony in a church, with pews, a groom, and a bride. Towards the end of the song, Swift walked with the groom across the venue towards an auxiliary stage (the B-stage) at the other end of the venue, where she continued with an acoustic segment, consisting of a mashup "Fearless" / Jason Mraz's "I'm Yours" / Train's "Hey, Soul Sister" on ukulele, and "Last Kiss" on guitar, performed with Swift sitting under an illuminated tree. The last song she performed on the B-stage was "You Belong with Me", for which she then returned to the main stage to join her band members dancing. Next, she sang "Dear John" as fireworks accompanied the song's chorus.

For the next number, "Enchanted", Swift performed standing on a winding staircase as her backup dancers reenacted a ballet. Before singing the next song, "Haunted", Swift used a mallet to strike giant bells. As she sang the track, the bells rose up off the stage and from which acrobatic dancers appeared, performing on trapezes. Swift then dedicated the next number, "Long Live", to her band and audience. During the encore, Swift sang "Fifteen" alone on guitar, sitting by herself on a sofa, as the video screens showed images of her touring band's members at 15 years old. She closed the concert with "Love Story"; she sang the song while standing on a suspended platform that resembled a balcony, whisking around the venue as confetti fell down.

=== Alterations ===
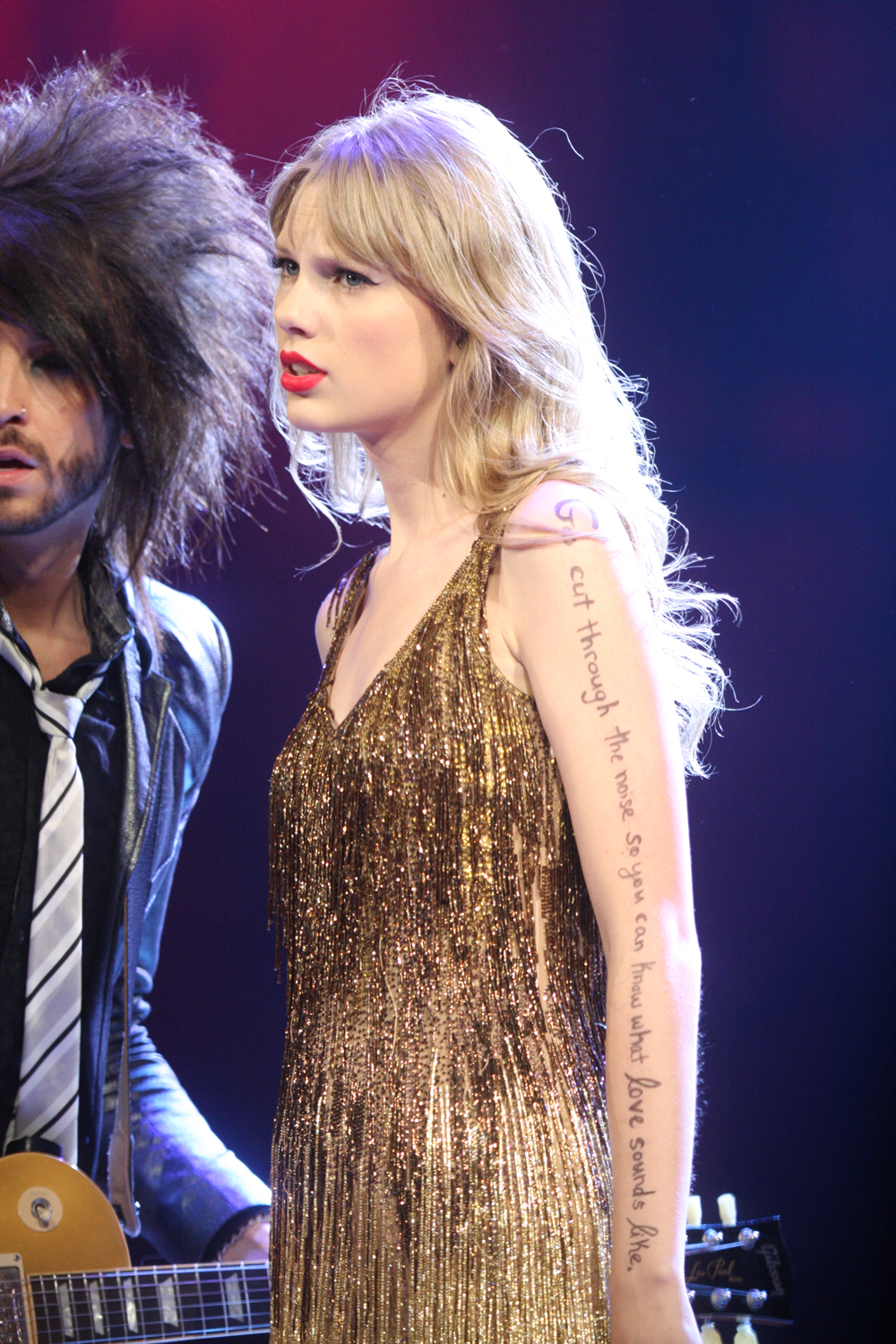
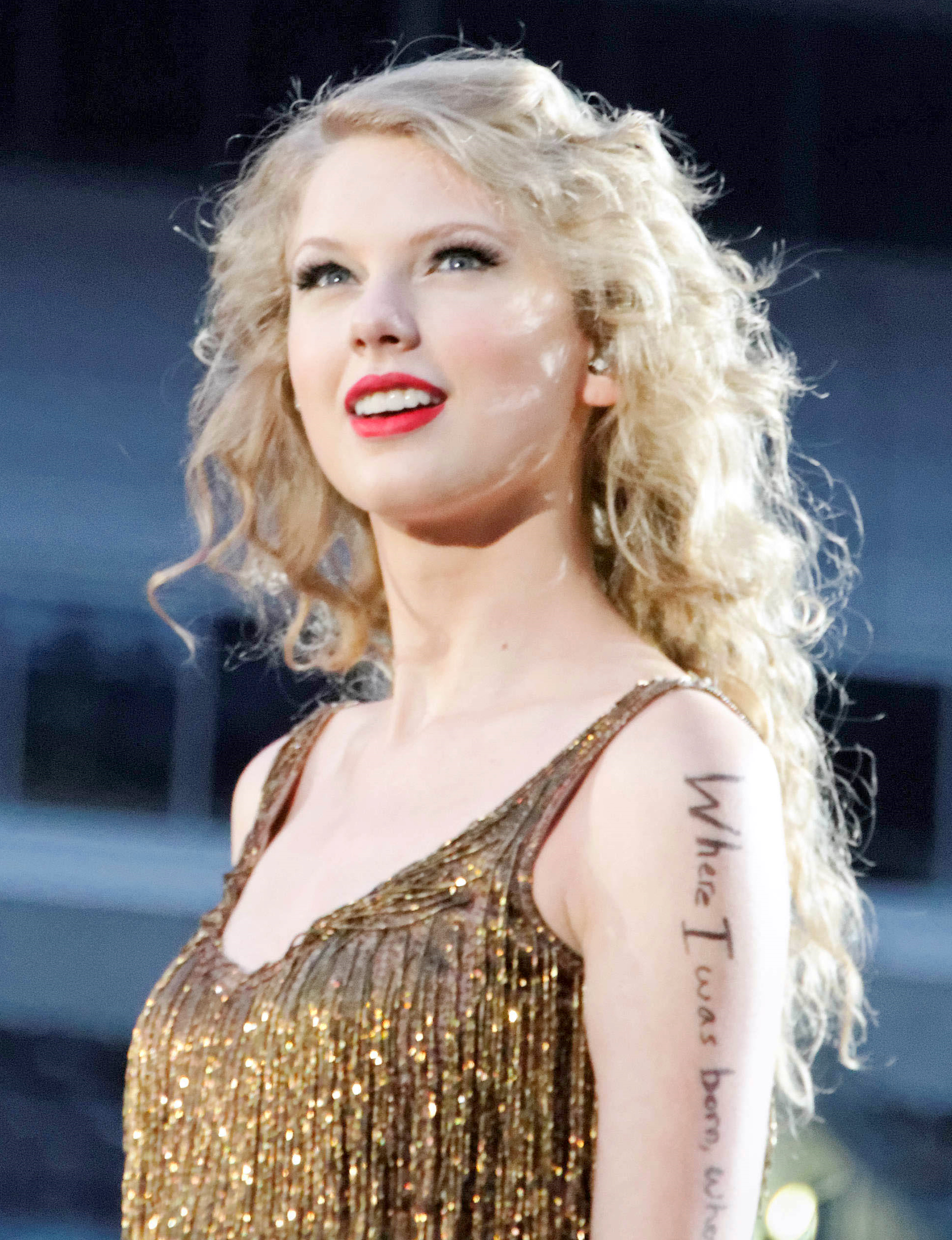
Swift quoted different song lyrics on her arm for each show; shown here are lyrics of Natasha Bedingfield's "Neon Lights" (left) and Montgomery Gentry's "My Town" (right).

The set list for the Asian and European legs was shorter: each show lasted for nearly 90 minutes, omitting several songs. "Ours" was added to the encore starting from the concert in Denver on September 27, 2011, and was performed during subsequent shows of the North American and Australasian legs. For the Australasian shows in March 2012, Swift added "Safe & Sound" during the encore. During the second Auckland show, she sang "Eyes Open" in place of "Safe & Sound".

Starting from the first North American show, Swift wrote different song lyrics and occasionally quotes from famous speeches and movies on her left arm for each show using a Sharpie marker. At a rehearsal for the tour in Nashville on May 21, 2011, Swift wrote a lyric from Selena Gomez's "Who Says" onto her left arm to cope with "a rough day", and she thereafter wrote different lyrics onto her arm "like a mood ring" for each show. Swift said that the song could be one she had not heard before, or one that somebody in the dressing room told her about before she went on the stage. Taste of Country thought that this practice demonstrated Swift's "mischievous habit of slipping encoded details of her personal life" into her music and performances, while The New Yorker cited it as an example of Swift's practice to increase "fan obsession" of "a desire for intimacy between singer and listener" by allowing her audience to get involved in her personal space.

Also on the North American shows, Swift performed many acoustic cover versions, and on each show she paid tribute to a homegrown artist. She stated that the cover versions allowed her to be "spontaneous" in an otherwise well-rehearsed show: "You'll have a lot of people who will come to more than one show, and I want them to get a different experience every time." On certain shows, Swift invited special guests such as Nicki Minaj, Justin Bieber, Usher, T.I., Jason Mraz, among others, and duetted with them.

== Critical reception ==
The first shows of the Speak Now World Tour in Asia and Europe received positive reviews. Reviews of the first show in Singapore by AsiaOne and The Straits Times highlighted Swift's sincere interactions with her audience. Reviewing the show in the Philippines, The Manila Bulletin wrote that it demonstrated Swift's "global appeal" that could attract "kids ... and their parents, ladies and their boyfriends ..., circles of friends, foreigners, and local celebrities all in one venue" and the Philippine Daily Inquirer complimented her musicianship demonstrated by the mashups and acoustic numbers. The Korea Times opined that despite performing in a half-full venue, Swift gave an entertaining show with well-produced visual accompaniments, her "charming qualities", and the "intense devotion" of the crowd. A review of the show in Germany by Soester Anzeiger described it as "bombastic American-style entertainment" with captivating theatrics and visuals. In a four-star review, The Guardian wrote: "Swift has the ability to flirt with 20,000 people at once, and so likably that you can forgive the occasional bit of shtick."

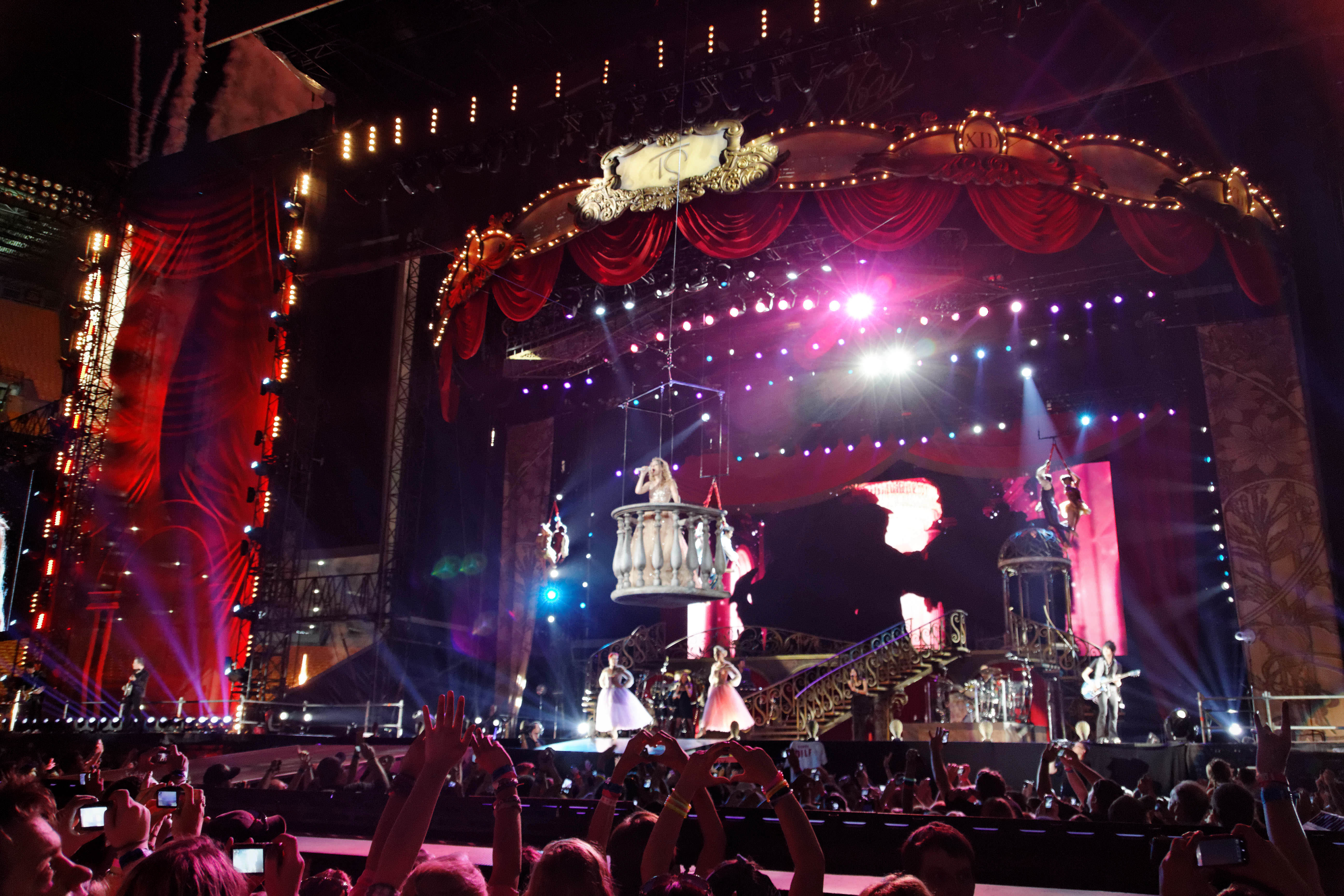
A view of the main stage. Some publications highlighted the Broadway-inspired theatrics of the shows.

Reviews from the North American press were generally positive. The Village Voice, The San Diego Union-Tribune, The Boston Globe, and Billboard applauded the performance for demonstrating Swift's songcraft about relatable subject matters that resonated well with her audience, while The Washington Post and the Pittsburgh Post-Gazette attributed Swift's relatability to her genuine and authentic stage persona. Entertainment Weekly complimented the set list for allowing the audience to give in to Swift's "girly fantasia" with songs about nostalgia and hopes: "Today might've been a fairy tale, but you've gotta have something for tomorrow."

Other reviews by The Baltimore Sun, The Oregonian, and The Philadelphia Inquirer highlighted the accompanying theatrics, costume changes, and stage aesthetics. Publications like The Star-Ledger, The Salt Lake Tribune, and The Globe and Mail, noted on the Broadway-influenced theatrics. The Boston Globe lauded Swift's ability to balance between the theatrics and her singing. The New York Times wrote that despite the deeply personal songs, Swift displayed "clockwork professionalism" with a "cool, systematic ambition". Australasian newspapers also gave the tour laudatory reviews. The Gold Coast Bulletin hailed Swift as "the complete package" and The New Zealand Herald, while remarking that the atmosphere of the show was "cloyingly romantic" that "can get a little too sugary", admired the combination of theatrics and songcraft that "we're unlikely to witness a show like that again in a long, long time".

Several reviews remarked on Swift's live vocals. The Oregonian wrote that her vocals did not span the greatest range but she made up for that with "the quality of her songwriting, top-notch performing skills and angelic good looks", while The Mercury News and the Pittsburgh Post-Gazette felt that Swift's plain and conventional voice effectively conveyed the message of her songs. The Baltimore Sun opined that the best part of the concert was when Swift performed acoustic numbers alone on guitar, while the Lubbock Avalanche-Journal praised Swift as not only a capable singer-songwriter but also an accomplished performer who knew how to engage her fans.

Some reviews were more reserved: OC Weekly opined that there were moments where it was hard to believe whether Swift was sincere or acting, while The Salt Lake Tribune thought that it would be nicer had Swift written songs about "something else meaningful" other than love and heartbreak. The Chicago Tribune opined that the theatrics were unnecessary and that Swift's "playing princess" was unfit for her status as a "grown-up superstar". The Fort Worth Star-Telegram wrote, "her patter was a little corny, obvious and ingratiating, but Swift is a grade-A charmer."

== Ticket sales and box office ==
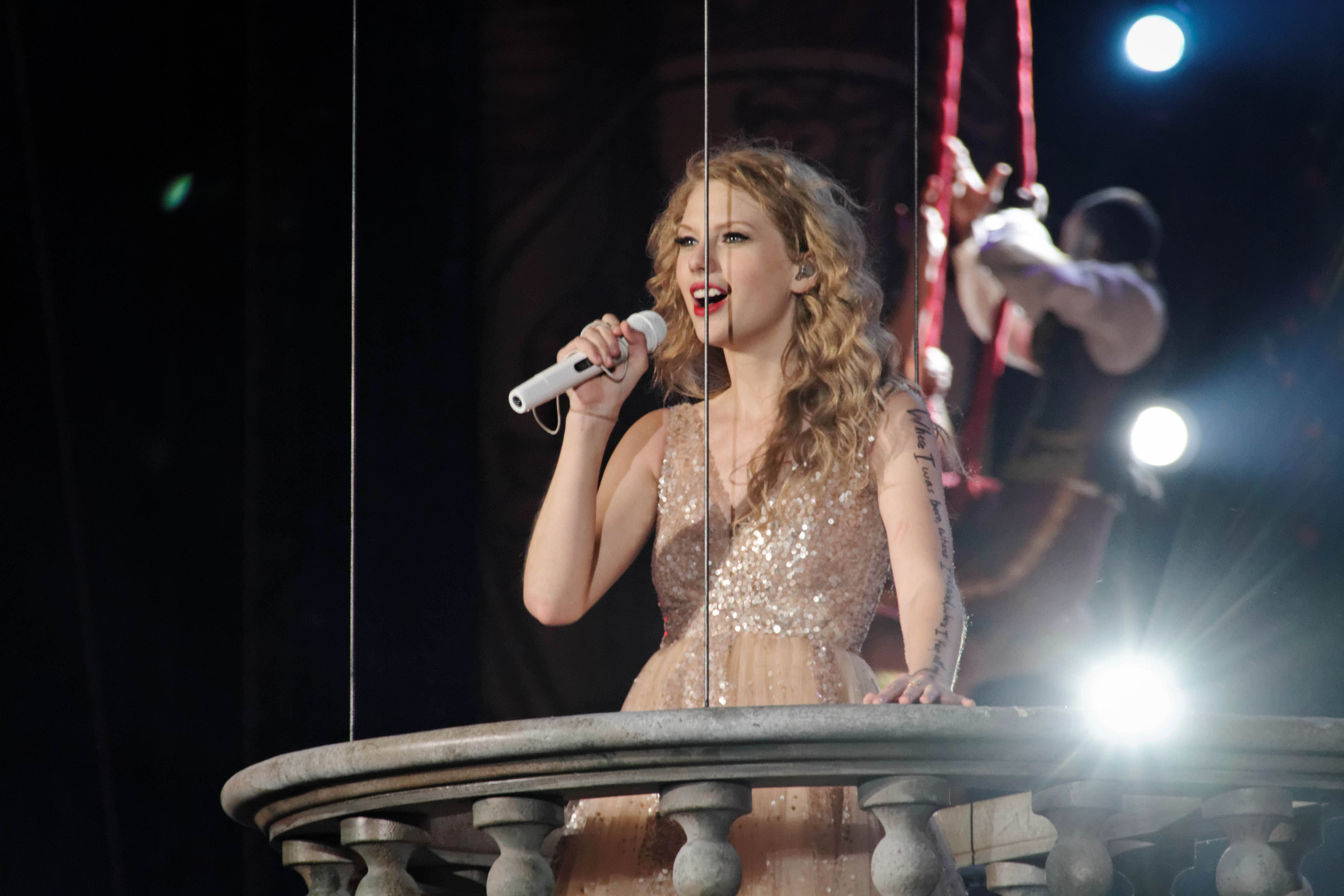
Swift singing "Love Story" on a suspended balcony at Heinz Field, Pittsburgh; it was one of the six stadium shows of the Speak Now World Tour in the United States.

Ticket sales for the first North American shows commenced on December 3, 2010. They sold out within minutes—the initial two Los Angeles shows at the Staples Center sold out in two minutes, and the Foxborough show at the Gillette Stadium sold out in five minutes—leading Swift to add two further shows in Los Angeles, one additional in Foxborough, and two additional in Newark. The tour was the first where Swift held multiple stadium shows in the United States, covering six football stadiums: Gilllete Stadium (Foxborough), Heinz Field (Pittsburgh), Ford Field (Detroit), Lincoln Financial Field (Philadelphia), Arrowhead Stadium (Kansas City), and Cowboys Stadium (Dallas). High demand for the Australasian leg also made Swift increase the number of shows in Melbourne and Auckland to three each.

The shows' attendance and gross were reported to Billboard. The Asian shows sold out quickly, including a two-day gig at the Nippon Budokan in Tokyo and a show in Osaka, Japan that drew 25,000 concertgoers. The European shows averaged 7,000 in attendance, with sell-out shows in the United Kingdom, Belgium, the Netherlands, and Germany. Upon wrapping up its North American leg at the Madison Square Garden in New York in November 2011, Swift and her management reported 1.5 million in ticket sales and $107.9 million in gross to Billboard; (Note: All figures are reported in US$ values at the date of report) the magazine commented that the extensive touring schedule was "a tough haul for a seasoned road warrior, much less a 21-year-old [Swift] on only her second headlining tour".

Based on data reported from November 1, 2010, through November 8, 2011, Billboard ranked Swift fifth on their "Top 25 Tours of 2011", reporting 1.4 million ticket sales and $97.4 million in gross from 89 dates, of which 87 were sold out. Meanwhile, Pollstar placed it fourth on their annual list of the "Top 25 Worldwide Tours", reporting earning of $104.2 million and attendance of 1.4 million from 100 shows; it was the highest-grossing tour by both a female artist and a solo artist on that list. On Pollstar's report for North America, the tour ranked as the second-highest-grossing of 2011, behind U2. The last shows of the tour in Australia and New Zealand were all sellouts; they drew in 138,000 in attendance and $15.8 million in gross per Billboard or $17 million in gross per Pollstar. In total, Billboard estimated the total gross as 123.7 million. At the 2011 Billboard Touring Award, the tour won the Concert Marketing & Promotion Award.

== Recording and broadcast ==
On May 21, 2011, Swift conducted the final rehearsal of the American show at Bridgestone Arena in Nashville. She turned the concert into a live stream event titled "Speak Now... Help Now" to fundraise for tornado victims. During the event, Swift streamed performances of "Mine" and "The Story of Us". The proceeds, amounting to $750,000, went directly to the Community Foundation of Middle Tennessee in order to help with tornado relief. Footage of four American shows were compiled in the music video for "Sparks Fly", released in August 2011. On September 14, 2011, The Ellen DeGeneres Show aired behind-the-scenes footage and Swift's live performance of "Our Song" with Ellen DeGeneres at the Staples Center in Los Angeles.

Big Machine Records released a live album, Speak Now World Tour – Live, on November 21, 2011, in North America. The live album contains a CD and a DVD featuring performances from various shows. One day prior to the release, CBS News aired a 60 Minutes profile of Swift, documenting behind-the-scenes footage of the tour.

== Standard set list ==
=== Asia and Europe ===
The following set list is adapted from shows in Quezon City on February 19, 2011, and Dublin on March 27, 2011.

1. "Sparks Fly"
2. "Mine"
3. "The Story of Us"
4. "Back to December" / "Apologize" / "You're Not Sorry"
5. "Better than Revenge"
6. "Speak Now"
7. "Fearless" / "I'm Yours" / "Hey, Soul Sister"
8. "Fifteen"
9. "You Belong with Me"
10. "Dear John"
11. "Enchanted"
12. "Long Live"

Encore

13. "Love Story"

=== North America ===
The following set list is adapted from the show in Newark, New Jersey on July 19, 2011. It is not intended to represent all shows throughout the remainder of the tour.

1. "Sparks Fly"
2. "Mine"
3. "The Story of Us"
4. "Our Song"
5. "Mean"
6. "Back to December" / "Apologize" / "You're Not Sorry"
7. "Better than Revenge"
8. "Speak Now"
9. "Fearless" / "I'm Yours" / "Hey, Soul Sister"
10. "Last Kiss"
11. Surprise cover
12. "You Belong with Me"
13. "Dear John"
14. "Enchanted"
15. "Haunted"
16. "Long Live"

Encore

17. "Fifteen"
18. "Love Story"

=== Notes ===
- During the show in Kansas City, Swift performed "Superman".
- Starting with the show in Denver, "Ours" was added to the set-list.
- During the shows in Lexington, Houston, and Raleigh, Swift performed "Never Grow Up".
- During the shows in Oceania, Swift performed "Safe & Sound" during the encore, except at the second show in Auckland, where she performed "Eyes Open".

== Alterations ==
=== Surprise covers ===
On select dates, Swift performed a cover of a local artist during the acoustic segment.

- July 15, 2011 – Toronto: "You Learn" by Alanis Morissette, "Baby" by Justin Bieber, and "She's So High" by Tal Bachman
- July 16, 2011 – Toronto: "Complicated" by Avril Lavigne
- July 19, 20 and 24, 2011 – Newark: "Livin' on a Prayer" by Bon Jovi
- July 20 and 24, 2011 – Newark: "Dancing in the Dark" by Bruce Springsteen
- July 23, 2011 – Newark: "Cowboy Take Me Away" by the Dixie Chicks
- July 28, 2011 – Grand Rapids: "Lose Yourself" by Eminem and "Smile" by Uncle Kracker
- July 29, 2011 – Indianapolis: "Jack & Diane" by John Cougar Mellencamp and "I Want You Back" by Jackson 5
- July 30, 2011 – Cleveland: "I Try" by Macy Gray and "My Wish" by Rascal Flatts
- August 3, 2011 – Washington: "Stay (I Missed You)" by Lisa Loeb and "A Sorta Fairytale" by Tori Amos
- August 6, 2011 – Philadelphia: "Who Knew" by Pink and "Unpretty" by TLC
- August 9, 2011 – Rosemont: "Sugar, We're Goin Down" by Fall Out Boy
- August 10, 2011 – Rosemont: "I Want You to Want Me" by Cheap Trick
- August 13–14, 2011 – St. Louis: "Just a Dream" by Nelly
- August 18–19, 2011 – Edmonton: "Complicated" by Carolyn Dawn Johnson
- August 23–24, 2011 – Los Angeles: "God Only Knows" by the Beach Boys
- August 23–24 and 28, 2011 – Los Angeles: "The Sweet Escape" by Gwen Stefani
- August 27, 2011 – Los Angeles: "Bette Davis Eyes" by Kim Carnes and "This Love" by Maroon 5
- August 28, 2011 – Los Angeles: "Realize" by Colbie Caillat
- September 1, 2011 – San Jose: "Drops of Jupiter" by Train
- September 2, 2011 – San Jose: "Good Riddance (Time of Your Life)" by Green Day
- September 6, 2011 – Portland: "Closer to Love" by Mat Kearney
- September 10, 2011 – Vancouver: "Summer of '69" by Bryan Adams
- September 11, 2011 – Vancouver: "Where Were You (When the World Stopped Turning)" by Alan Jackson
- September 16–17, 2011 – Nashville: "Nashville" by David Mead
- September 20, 2011 – Bossier City: "Lucky" by Britney Spears
- September 21, 2011 – Tulsa: "Swing, Swing" by the All-American Rejects
- September 27, 2011 – Denver: "How to Save a Life" by the Fray
- September 28, 2011 – Salt Lake City: "Animal" by Neon Trees
- October 1–2, 2011 – Atlanta: "Baby Girl" by Sugarland
- October 4, 2011 – North Little Rock: "Ain't Nothing 'Bout You" by Brooks & Dunn
- October 5, 2011 – New Orleans: "Breathless" by Better Than Ezra
- October 8, 2011 – Arlington: "The Boys of Summer" by Don Henley
- October 11, 2011 – Louisville: "The Back of Your Hand" by Dwight Yoakam
- October 14, 2011 – Lubbock: "Wide Open Spaces" by the Dixie Chicks
- October 15, 2011 – Oklahoma City: "What Hurts the Most" by Rascal Flatts
- October 20, 2011 – San Diego: "Dare You to Move" by Switchfoot
- October 21, 2011 – Glendale: "No Parade" by Jordin Sparks
- October 22, 2011 – Glendale: "All You Wanted" by Michelle Branch
- October 25, 2011 – San Antonio: "Run" by George Strait
- October 26, 2011 – Austin: "Hold On" by Jack Ingram
- October 30, 2011 – Memphis: "Cry Me a River" by Justin Timberlake

=== Special guests ===
Swift invited special guests for certain shows and performed with them:

- August 23, 2011 – Los Angeles: "Baby" with Justin Bieber
- August 24, 2011 – Los Angeles: "I'm Yours" with Jason Mraz
- August 27, 2011 – Los Angeles: "Tonight Tonight" with Hot Chelle Rae
- August 28, 2011 – Los Angeles: "Super Bass" with Nicki Minaj
- September 10, 2011 – Vancouver: "She's So High" with Tal Bachman
- September 16, 2011 – Nashville: "Bleed Red" with Ronnie Dunn and "That's What You Get" with Hayley Williams of Paramore
- September 17, 2011 – Nashville: "Keep Your Head Up" with Andy Grammer, "Big Star" with Kenny Chesney, and "Just to See You Smile" with Tim McGraw
- October 1, 2011 – Atlanta: "Yeah!" with Usher
- October 2, 2011 – Atlanta: "Live Your Life" with T.I.
- October 8, 2011 – Arlington: "Airplanes" with B.o.B
- October 21, 2011 – Glendale: "Meant to Live" with Jon Foreman of Switchfoot
- October 22, 2011 – Glendale: "The Middle" with Jim Adkins of Jimmy Eat World
- October 26, 2011 – Austin: "Sunny Came Home" with Shawn Colvin
- November 5, 2011 – Houston: "Just a Dream" with Nelly
- November 13, 2011 – Miami: "Right Round" with Flo Rida
- November 18, 2011 – Columbia: "Alright" with Darius Rucker
- November 21, 2011 – New York City: "Iris" with John Rzeznik of Goo Goo Dolls
- November 22, 2011 – New York City: "Who Says" with Selena Gomez and "Fire and Rain" with James Taylor

== Tour dates ==
List of 2011 concerts
Date (2011)	City	Country	Venue	Opening acts	Attendance (Note: As reported by Billboard Boxscore, based on attendance and availability)	Revenue
February 9	Singapore		Singapore Indoor Stadium	Sezairi Sezali	8,964 / 8,964	$916,850
February 11	Seoul	South Korea	Olympic Gymnastics Arena	—N/a	4,725 / 4,725	$385,374
February 13	Osaka	Japan	Osaka-Jo Hall	Johnny Saito	6,953 / 6,953	$758,113
February 16	Tokyo	Japan	Nippon Budokan	Johnny Saito	15,955 / 15,955	$1,738,227
February 17	Tokyo	Japan	Nippon Budokan	Johnny Saito	15,955 / 15,955	$1,738,227
February 19	Quezon City (Note: Labelled as Manila in promotional material)	Philippines	Smart Araneta Coliseum	Sam Concepcion	12,667 / 12,667	$859,037
February 21	Hong Kong		AsiaWorld–Arena	Johnny Saito	12,573 / 12,573	$1,030,633
March 6	Brussels	Belgium	Forest National	Tom Dice	4,622 / 4,622	$219,212
March 7	Rotterdam	Netherlands	Sportpaleis van Ahoy	Tom Dice	4,799 / 4,799	$248,314
March 9	Oslo	Norway	Oslo Spektrum	—N/a	8,650 / 8,650	$815,246
March 12	Oberhausen	Germany	König Pilsener Arena	Martin & James	6,082 / 6,082	$370,028
March 15	Assago	Italy	Mediolanum Forum	Emma Marrone	3,421 / 5,585	$153,303
March 17	Paris	France	Zénith de Paris	—N/a	3,598 / 3,598	$201,781
March 19	Madrid	Spain	Palacio de los Deportes	The Bright	3,962 / 3,962	$251,864
March 22	Birmingham	England	LG Arena	Martin & James	9,339 / 9,339	$508,854
March 25	Belfast	Northern Ireland	Odyssey Arena	Ryan Sheridan	8,058 / 8,058	$379,001
March 27	Dublin	Ireland	The O_{2}	Ryan Sheridan	8,681 / 8,681	$419,806
March 29	Manchester	England	Manchester Evening News Arena	Martin & James	10,488 / 11,622	$580,558
March 30	London	England	The O_{2} Arena	Martin & James	15,265 / 15,681	$891,152
May 27	Omaha	United States	Qwest Center Omaha	The JaneDear Girls; Needtobreathe; Frankie Ballard	26,992 / 26,992	$1,717,104
May 28	Omaha	United States	Qwest Center Omaha	The JaneDear Girls; Needtobreathe; Frankie Ballard	26,992 / 26,992	$1,717,104
May 29	Des Moines	United States	Wells Fargo Arena	The JaneDear Girls; Needtobreathe; Frankie Ballard	13,149 / 13,149	$862,771
June 2	Sunrise (Note: Labelled as Miami in promotional material)	United States	BankAtlantic Center	The JaneDear Girls; Needtobreathe; Frankie Ballard	24,077 / 24,077	$1,582,951
June 3	Sunrise	United States	BankAtlantic Center	The JaneDear Girls; Needtobreathe; Frankie Ballard	24,077 / 24,077	$1,582,951
June 4	Orlando	United States	Amway Center	The JaneDear Girls; Needtobreathe; Frankie Ballard	12,262 / 12,262	$791,980
June 7	Columbus	United States	Nationwide Arena	The JaneDear Girls; Needtobreathe; Frankie Ballard	14,817 / 14,817	$955,259
June 8	Milwaukee	United States	Bradley Center	The JaneDear Girls; Needtobreathe; Frankie Ballard	13,748 / 13,748	$897,042
June 11	Detroit	United States	Ford Field	The JaneDear Girls; Needtobreathe; Frankie Ballard; Randy Montana	47,992 / 47,992	$3,453,549
June 14	Saint Paul	United States	Xcel Energy Center	The JaneDear Girls; Needtobreathe; Frankie Ballard; Randy Montana	28,977 / 28,977	$1,913,737
June 15	Saint Paul	United States	Xcel Energy Center	The JaneDear Girls; Needtobreathe; Frankie Ballard; Randy Montana	28,977 / 28,977	$1,913,737
June 18	Pittsburgh	United States	Heinz Field	Needtobreathe; Randy Montana; Danny Gokey	52,009 / 52,009	$4,009,118
June 21	Buffalo	United States	First Niagara Center	Needtobreathe; Randy Montana	14,487 / 14,487	$966,749
June 22	Hartford	United States	XL Center	Needtobreathe; Randy Montana	12,436 / 12,436	$810,165
June 25	Foxborough	United States	Gillette Stadium	Needtobreathe; Randy Montana; James Wesley	110,800 / 110,800	$8,026,350
June 26	Foxborough	United States	Gillette Stadium	Needtobreathe; Randy Montana; James Wesley	110,800 / 110,800	$8,026,350
June 30	Greensboro	United States	Greensboro Coliseum	Needtobreathe; James Wesley	14,789 / 14,789	$990,701
July 1	Knoxville	United States	Thompson–Boling Arena	Needtobreathe; James Wesley	13,754 / 13,754	$903,875
July 14	Montreal	Canada	Bell Centre	Needtobreathe; Danny Gokey	13,439 / 13,439	$1,254,230
July 15	Toronto	Canada	Air Canada Centre	Needtobreathe; Danny Gokey	30,144 / 30,144	$3,036,000
July 16	Toronto	Canada	Air Canada Centre	Needtobreathe; Danny Gokey	30,144 / 30,144	$3,036,000
July 19	Newark	United States	Prudential Center	Needtobreathe; Danny Gokey	51,487 / 51,487	$3,875,463
July 20	Newark	United States	Prudential Center	Needtobreathe; Danny Gokey	51,487 / 51,487	$3,875,463
July 23	Newark	United States	Prudential Center	Needtobreathe; Danny Gokey	51,487 / 51,487	$3,875,463
July 24	Newark	United States	Prudential Center	Needtobreathe; Danny Gokey	51,487 / 51,487	$3,875,463
July 28	Grand Rapids	United States	Van Andel Arena	Needtobreathe; Hunter Hayes	11,012 / 11,012	$724,854
July 29	Indianapolis	United States	Conseco Fieldhouse	Needtobreathe; Hunter Hayes	13,329 / 13,329	$877,175
July 30	Cleveland	United States	Quicken Loans Arena	Needtobreathe; Hunter Hayes	14,873 / 14,873	$976,954
August 2	Washington, D.C.	United States	Verizon Center	Needtobreathe; Hunter Hayes	29,303 / 29,303	$2,068,789
August 3	Washington, D.C.	United States	Verizon Center	Needtobreathe; Hunter Hayes	29,303 / 29,303	$2,068,789
August 6	Philadelphia	United States	Lincoln Financial Field	Needtobreathe; Hunter Hayes; James Wesley	51,395 / 51,395	$4,268,678
August 9	Rosemont	United States	Allstate Arena	Needtobreathe; Hunter Hayes	26,112 / 26,112	$1,909,603
August 10	Rosemont	United States	Allstate Arena	Needtobreathe; Hunter Hayes	26,112 / 26,112	$1,909,603
August 13	St. Louis	United States	Scottrade Center	Needtobreathe; Hunter Hayes	27,965 / 27,965	$1,850,159
August 14	St. Louis	United States	Scottrade Center	Needtobreathe; Hunter Hayes	27,965 / 27,965	$1,850,159
August 18	Edmonton	Canada	Rexall Place	Needtobreathe; James Wesley	25,336 / 25,336	$2,136,270
August 19	Edmonton	Canada	Rexall Place	Needtobreathe; James Wesley	25,336 / 25,336	$2,136,270
August 23	Los Angeles	United States	Staples Center	Needtobreathe; James Wesley	54,900 / 54,900	$3,927,154
August 24	Los Angeles	United States	Staples Center	Needtobreathe; James Wesley	54,900 / 54,900	$3,927,154
August 27	Los Angeles	United States	Staples Center	Needtobreathe; James Wesley	54,900 / 54,900	$3,927,154
August 28	Los Angeles	United States	Staples Center	Needtobreathe; James Wesley	54,900 / 54,900	$3,927,154
September 1	San Jose	United States	HP Pavilion	Needtobreathe; James Wesley	24,827 / 24,827	$1,825,448
September 2	San Jose	United States	HP Pavilion	Needtobreathe; James Wesley	24,827 / 24,827	$1,825,448
September 3	Sacramento	United States	Power Balance Pavilion	Needtobreathe; James Wesley	12,432 / 12,432	$934,326
September 6	Portland	United States	Rose Garden	Needtobreathe; James Wesley	13,610 / 13,610	$903,445
September 7	Tacoma (Note: Labelled as Seattle in promotional material)	United States	Tacoma Dome	Needtobreathe; James Wesley	19,904 / 19,904	$1,289,430
September 10	Vancouver	Canada	Rogers Arena	Needtobreathe; James Wesley	26,030 / 26,030	$2,190,680
September 11	Vancouver	Canada	Rogers Arena	Needtobreathe; James Wesley	26,030 / 26,030	$2,190,680
September 16	Nashville	United States	Bridgestone Arena	Needtobreathe; Charlie Worsham	28,178 / 28,178	$1,841,134
September 17	Nashville	United States	Bridgestone Arena	Needtobreathe; Charlie Worsham	28,178 / 28,178	$1,841,134
September 20	Bossier City	United States	CenturyLink Center	Needtobreathe; Charlie Worsham	11,510 / 11,510	$728,546
September 21	Tulsa	United States	BOK Center	Needtobreathe; Charlie Worsham	12,546 / 12,546	$907,573
September 24	Kansas City	United States	Arrowhead Stadium	Needtobreathe; Charlie Worsham	48,562 / 48,562	$3,148,046
September 27	Denver	United States	Pepsi Center	Needtobreathe; Charlie Worsham	12,908 / 12,908	$834,916
September 28	Salt Lake City	United States	EnergySolutions Arena	Needtobreathe; Charlie Worsham	13,720 / 13,720	$896,946
October 1 (Note: The shows on October 1 and 2, 2011, in Atlanta at the Philips Arena were originally scheduled for July 9 and 10, 2011; however, due to illness, the shows were postponed.)	Atlanta	United States	Philips Arena	Needtobreathe; James Wesley	26,244 / 26,244	$1,726,661
October 2	Atlanta	United States	Philips Arena	Needtobreathe; James Wesley	26,244 / 26,244	$1,726,661
October 4	North Little Rock	United States	Verizon Arena	Needtobreathe; Charlie Worsham	13,566 / 13,566	$856,123
October 5	New Orleans	United States	New Orleans Arena	Needtobreathe; Charlie Worsham	12,943 / 12,943	$830,289
October 8	Arlington	United States	Cowboys Stadium	Needtobreathe; James Wesley; Charlie Worsham	55,451 / 55,451	$4,337,062
October 11 (Note: The show on October 11, 2011, in Louisville at the KFC Yum! Center was originally scheduled for July 2, 2011; however, due to illness, the show was postponed.)	Louisville	United States	KFC Yum! Center	Needtobreathe; James Wesley	14,848 / 14,848	$1,003,828
October 14	Lubbock	United States	United Spirit Arena	Needtobreathe; David Nail	10,419 / 10,419	$710,426
October 15	Oklahoma City	United States	Chesapeake Energy Arena	Needtobreathe; David Nail	11,592 / 11,592	$758,364
October 20	San Diego	United States	Valley View Casino Center	Needtobreathe; David Nail	10,834 / 10,834	$792,634
October 21	Glendale	United States	Jobing.com Arena	Needtobreathe; David Nail	27,029 / 27,029	$1,826,025
October 22	Glendale	United States	Jobing.com Arena	Needtobreathe; David Nail	27,029 / 27,029	$1,826,025
October 25	San Antonio	United States	AT&T Center	Needtobreathe; David Nail	13,851 / 13,851	$901,535
October 26	Austin	United States	Frank Erwin Center	Needtobreathe; David Nail	11,999 / 11,999	$752,078
October 29	Lexington	United States	Rupp Arena	Needtobreathe; David Nail	16,237 / 16,237	$1,041,935
October 30	Memphis	United States	FedExForum	Needtobreathe; David Nail	12,604 / 12,604	$820,036
November 5	Houston	United States	Minute Maid Park	Needtobreathe; David Nail; Adam Brand	42,095 / 42,095	$3,435,756
November 11	Jacksonville	United States	Jacksonville Veterans Memorial Arena	Needtobreathe; Adam Brand	11,785 / 11,785	$749,099
November 12	Tampa	United States	St. Pete Times Forum	Needtobreathe; Adam Brand	13,695 / 13,695	$914,300
November 13	Miami	United States	American Airlines Arena	Needtobreathe; Adam Brand	12,153 / 12,153	$786,904
November 16 (Note: The show on November 16, 2011, in Charlotte at the Time Warner Cable Arena was originally scheduled for July 8, 2011; however, due to illness, the show was postponed.)	Charlotte	United States	Time Warner Cable Arena	Needtobreathe; Danny Gokey	14,272 / 14,272	$920,903
November 17	Raleigh	United States	RBC Center	Needtobreathe; Adam Brand	13,567 / 13,567	$866,056
November 18	Columbia	United States	Colonial Life Arena	Needtobreathe; Adam Brand	12,807 / 12,807	$828,231
November 21	New York City	United States	Madison Square Garden	Needtobreathe; David Nail; Adam Brand	26,652 / 26,652	$1,988,411
November 22	New York City	United States	Madison Square Garden	Needtobreathe; David Nail; Adam Brand	26,652 / 26,652	$1,988,411

List of 2012 concerts
Date (2012)	City	Country	Venue	Opening acts	Attendance	Revenue
March 2	Perth	Australia	Burswood Dome	Hot Chelle Rae	15,142 / 15,142	$1,878,530
March 4	Adelaide	Australia	Adelaide Entertainment Centre	Hot Chelle Rae	8,589 / 8,589	$1,075,370
March 6	Brisbane	Australia	Brisbane Entertainment Centre	Hot Chelle Rae	19,870 / 19,870	$2,416,030
March 7	Brisbane	Australia	Brisbane Entertainment Centre	Hot Chelle Rae	19,870 / 19,870	$2,416,030
March 9	Sydney	Australia	Allphones Arena	Hot Chelle Rae	27,900 / 27,900	$3,420,360
March 10	Sydney	Australia	Allphones Arena	Hot Chelle Rae	27,900 / 27,900	$3,420,360
March 12	Melbourne	Australia	Rod Laver Arena	Hot Chelle Rae	33,793 / 33,793	$4,151,650
March 13	Melbourne	Australia	Rod Laver Arena	Hot Chelle Rae	33,793 / 33,793	$4,151,650
March 14	Melbourne	Australia	Rod Laver Arena	Hot Chelle Rae	33,793 / 33,793	$4,151,650
March 16	Auckland	New Zealand	Vector Arena	Hot Chelle Rae	32,585 / 32,585	$2,888,560
March 17	Auckland	New Zealand	Vector Arena	Hot Chelle Rae	32,585 / 32,585	$2,888,560
March 18	Auckland	New Zealand	Vector Arena	Hot Chelle Rae	32,585 / 32,585	$2,888,560
Total					1,645,135 / 1,648,849 (99.75%)	$123,678,576

== See also ==
- List of highest-grossing concert tours by women
