= Dear John (Taylor Swift song) =

2010 song by Taylor Swift

Song by Taylor Swift

from the album Speak Now
- Released: October 25, 2010
- Genre: Power ballad; country; country pop; electric blues; soft rock
- Length: 6:43
- Label: Big Machine
- Songwriter: Taylor Swift
- Producers: Taylor Swift; Nathan Chapman

Audio video
- "Dear John" on YouTube

"Dear John" is a song written and recorded by the American singer-songwriter Taylor Swift for her third studio album, Speak Now (2010). The title references the Dear John letter, which is a letter written to a man by his romantic partner to inform him that their relationship is over. The lyrics describe a 19-year-old's toxic and inappropriate relationship with an older man. Produced by Swift and Nathan Chapman, "Dear John" is a slow-burning country power ballad combining country pop, electric blues, and soft rock styles; the production incorporates electric guitar licks.

When Speak Now was first released, many critics praised "Dear John" for its emotional impact and jarring subject matter, though some criticized the accusatory nature of the lyrics as shallow and shortsighted. In retrospect, critics have universally acclaimed the song and regarded it as one of Swift's best in her catalog for its songwriting. "Dear John" peaked at number 54 on the US Billboard Hot 100 and at number 66 on the Canadian Hot 100. Swift included the song in the set list to her Speak Now World Tour (2010–2011). A re-recorded version, titled "Dear John (Taylor's Version)", was released as part of her third re-recorded album Speak Now (Taylor's Version) on July 7, 2023.

== Background and release ==
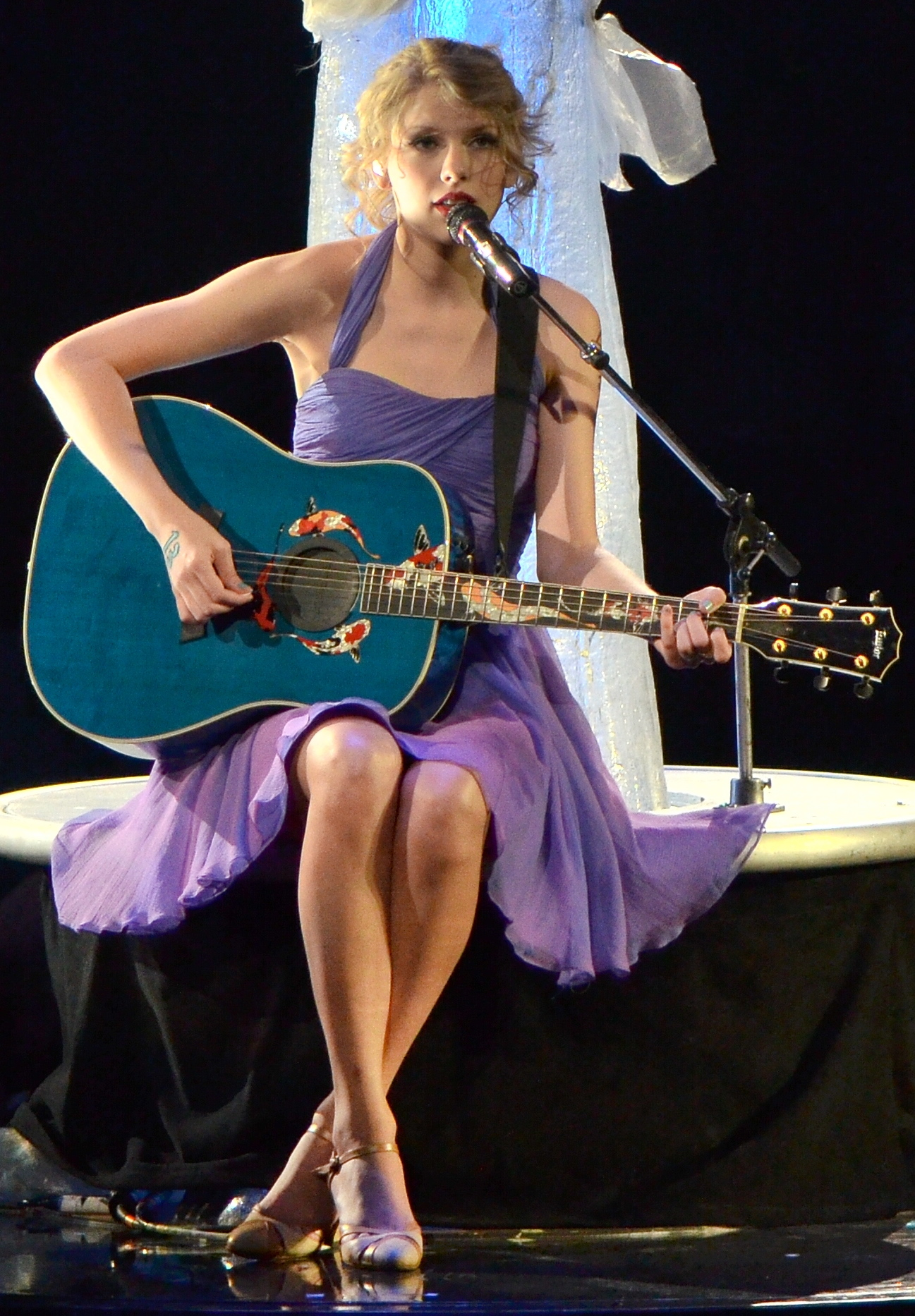
Swift on the Speak Now World Tour (2011)

Taylor Swift began work on her third studio album, Speak Now (2010), two years prior to its release. According to Swift, the album is a collection of songs about the things she had wanted to but could not say to the people she had met in real life. In the liner notes for Speak Now, Swift explained that every song on the album is an "open letter" to someone in her life, "telling them what I meant to tell them in person", noting that one song in particular is addressed to "someone who made my world very dark for a while". When Rolling Stone journalist Brian Hiatt asked about the track's "mercilessness", Swift said: "In every one of my relationships, I've been good and fair. [...] Chances are if they're being written about in a way they don't like, it’s because they hurt me really badly. [...] I don't think it's mean."

In an interview with Brian Mansfield for USA Today (October 2010), she said that the subject behind "Dear John" was an ex-boyfriend of hers, who was also the subject behind "The Story of Us", another Speak Now track. Whereas "The Story of Us" was inspired by their encounter at an awards show, "Dear John" was akin to "the last e-mail you'd send to somebody you used to be in a relationship with". The song is track number five on Speak Now, which was released on October 25, 2010, through Big Machine Records. Swift included the song on the set list of her Speak Now World Tour (2011–2012). During the shows, as the song approached its end, fireworks exploded onstage to accompany the lyrics, "I'm shining like fireworks over your sad, empty town." At the June 24, 2023, show in Minneapolis, as part of the Eras Tour (2023–2024), Swift performed "Dear John" as a "surprise song". Swift later performed "Dear John" on the August 17, 2024, show in London, in a mashup with "Sad Beautiful Tragic" (2012).

== Music and production ==
"Dear John" is a slow-burning power ballad produced by Swift and Nathan Chapman. At six minutes and forty three seconds (6:43), it is the longest track on Speak Now. Music critics described the genre as country, country pop, electric blues, and soft rock. They found influences of blues styles such as blues rock, specifically due to the electric guitar licks; Spin's Marc Hogan and Slant Magazine's Jonathan Keefe attributed the blues elements to a possible influence by the musician John Mayer, with Keefe thinking the "blues-pop" arrangement was reminiscent of Mayer's 2006 album Continuum. In the Los Angeles Times, Ann Powers wrote that Swift's vocals in "Dear John" expand considerably compared to those on her previous songs: "she opens up her throat so wide that she almost yells." According to George Lang from The Oklahoman, "'Dear John' could be a broadside worthy of Polly Jean Harvey."

== Lyrical interpretation ==
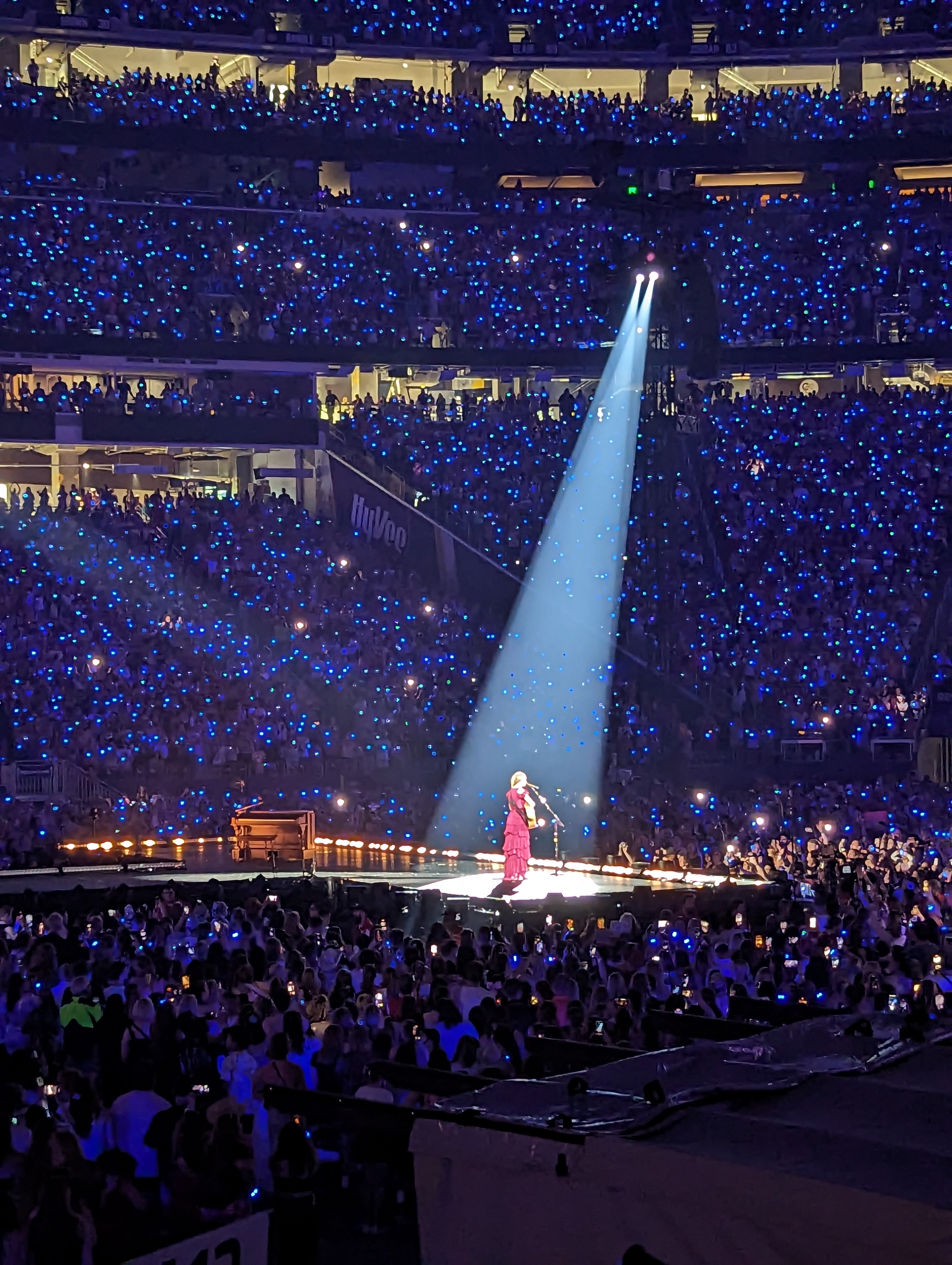
Swift performing "Dear John" as a "surprise song" on the Eras Tour (2023)

The title of "Dear John" references the expression "Dear John letter", which refers to a letter written to a man by his romantic partner to inform him that their relationship is over. Rob Sheffield from Rolling Stone summarized the lyrics as a "dissection of a failed quasi-relationship, with no happy ending, no moral, no solution, not even a lesson learned – just a bad memory filed away". The narrator is a 19-year-old woman who is manipulated by an older man whose motives she describes as "dark" and "twisted". She describes the reasons why she became heartbroken, confronts the man ("Don't you think I was too young to be messed with?"), recalls their tumultuous relationship ("You are an expert at sorry / And keeping lines blurry / And never impressed by me acing your tests / All the girls that you've run dry / Have tired, lifeless eyes / 'Cause you burned them out"), and blames herself for their problems ("I should've known").

After the bridge, she tells him, "I'm shining like fireworks over your sad, empty town", declaring her decision to move on. Some critics remarked that this part is the climax. The final line switches from "I should've known" to "You should've known", holding the man accountable for his wrongdoings. Eric R. Danton from the Hartford Courant considered the lyrics both a continuation of the "wistful teenage puppy-love mindset" of Swift's previous albums and an exploration of more grown-up perspectives. Sociologist and criminologist Laura L. Finley considers the narrator a survivor of sexual abuse when she was too young.

Due to Swift's high-profile, short-lived relationship with the singer-songwriter John Mayer, the media surmised that "Dear John" might have been inspired by him. In an interview with Rolling Stone (June 2012), Mayer said the song "humiliated" him and dismissed it as "cheap songwriting". Swift never confirmed nor denied the association, saying in an interview with Glamour (October 2012): "How presumptuous! I never disclose who my songs are about." Musicologist James E. Perone compared "Dear John" to John Lennon's "How Do You Sleep?" (1971), allegedly about fellow musician Paul McCartney, in how both were open letters directed at another celebrity that affected their personal lives. Sharing the same idea, Chris Willman from Yahoo! wrote that not since the Lennon–McCartney affair "has a major pop singer-songwriter so publicly and unguardedly taken on another in song", and he argued that "Dear John" was "braver... and more cutting" because of its "vulnerability and woundedness". Perone and Taffy Brodesser-Akner from The Paris Review commented that the song alludes to many of Mayer's supposedly egoistical and controversial traits; to this extent, the latter considered it a "master class in passive-aggression".

== Critical reception ==
Many critics selected "Dear John" as Speak Now's best song for its production and emotional impact. Such critics include Jon Caramanica in The New York Times (lauding the blues production for expanding beyond Swift's country-music comfort zone), Mikael Wood in Spin (saying it was "epic pop-country poetry"), and Willman in The Hollywood Reporter (underscoring the "chills-inducing climax"). Rolling Stone's Brittany Spanos and Vulture's Nate Jones highlighted the production's perceived similarities to Mayer's music, and Spanos deemed it superior to any of his work.

Several critics also praised the vivid and detail-heavy lyrics—Dan DeLuca of The Philadelphia Inquirer said "Dear John" was a sign of Swift's "growing confidence" in songwriting. Hogan wrote that this quality, alongside the song's deliberate pace, made "Dear John" a "devastating takedown for the ages". Meanwhile, Perone thought the track's length is a weak point because it pads the album's runtime. Other critics deemed the lyrics shallow and shortsighted, including The Morning Call's John J. Moser (criticizing Swift as "a bitter brat swimming in self pity"), Fort Worth Star-Telegram's Preston Jones (labelling the song "self-indulgent"), and Keefe (deeming it self-righteous). Billboard ranked "Dear John" at number 18 on its list of the "100 Best Deep Cuts by 21st Century Pop Stars", and its editor Jason Lipshutz lauded how "each bruised syllable is essential, every seething accusation methodically rolled out".

Critics have considered "Dear John" one of Swift's best songs. It was ranked among her best 10 tracks by Sheffield (2021), Song (2019), and The Independent's Roisin O'Connor (2019). For Sheffield, though the song might sound like a spontaneous vent, "it takes one devious operator to make a song this intricate feel that way". Clash (2021) included "Dear John" among Swift's top 15 songs—writer Lauren DeHollogne cited how the narrator's naivete makes the song simultaneously excruciating and beautiful to listen to.

== Charts ==
Chart performance
Chart (2010)	Peak position
Canada Hot 100 (Billboard)	68
US Billboard Hot 100	54
US Country Digital Song Sales (Billboard)	4

== Certification ==
Certification
Region	Certification	Certified units/sales
Australia (ARIA)	Gold	35,000^{‡}
^{‡} Sales+streaming figures based on certification alone.

== "Dear John (Taylor's Version)" ==
"Dear John (Taylor's Version)"

Song by Taylor Swift

from the album Speak Now (Taylor's Version)
- Released: July 7, 2023
- Studio: Blackbird (Nashville)
- Genre: Blues rock
- Length: 6:45
- Label: Republic
- Songwriter: Taylor Swift
- Producers: Taylor Swift; Christopher Rowe

Lyric video
- "Dear John (Taylor's Version)" on YouTube

After signing a new contract with Republic Records, Swift began re-recording her first six studio albums in November 2020. The decision came after the public 2019 dispute between Swift and the talent manager Scooter Braun, who acquired Big Machine Records, including the masters of Swift's albums the label had released. By re-recording her catalog, Swift had full ownership of the new masters, including the copyright licensing of her songs, devaluing the Big Machine-owned masters. A re-recorded version of "Dear John", titled "Dear John (Taylor's Version)", was released on July 7, 2023, via Republic Records as part of Speak Now (Taylor's Version), Swift's third re-recorded album. The re-recorded song features a blues rock arrangement.

=== Personnel ===
Adapted from Speak Now (Taylor's Version) digital album inline notes

- Taylor Swift – vocals, background vocals, songwriter, producer
- Christopher Rowe – producer, vocal engineer
- David Payne – recording engineer
- Lowell Reynolds – assistant recording engineer, editor
- Derek Garten – engineer, editor, programming
- Serban Ghenea – mixing
- Bryce Bordone – mix engineer
- Randy Merrill – mastering
- Matt Billingslea – drums, percussion, vibraphone
- Amos Heller – bass guitar
- Paul Sidoti – electric guitar
- Mike Meadows – acoustic guitar, Hammond B-3, background vocals
- Max Bernstein – electric guitar, synthesizer
- David Cook – piano
- Dan Burns – synthesizer programming

=== Charts ===
Chart performance for Taylor's version
Chart (2023)	Peak position
Australia (ARIA)	26
Canada Hot 100 (Billboard)	35
Global 200 (Billboard)	28
Greece (IFPI)	90
New Zealand (Recorded Music NZ)	27
Philippines (Billboard)	7
UK Streaming (OCC)	49
US Billboard Hot 100	26
US Hot Country Songs (Billboard)	9

=== Certifications ===
Certifications for Taylor's version
Region	Certification	Certified units/sales
Australia (ARIA)	Gold	35,000^{‡}
^{‡} Sales+streaming figures based on certification alone.
