= The Oxonian Review =

University of Oxford student literary magazine

- Categories: Literary magazine
- Frequency: Online: fortnightly during Oxford University term time; print: annually
- Founded: 2001
- Country: United Kingdom
- Language: English
- Website: oxonianreview.com

The Oxonian Review is a literary magazine produced by the students at the University of Oxford. Every fortnight during term time, an online edition is published featuring reviews and essays on current affairs and literature, alongside creative work including photo essays, poetry, fiction and artwork. It is the largest university-wide postgraduate-student publication at the University of Oxford.

== History ==
The Oxonian Review was established in 2001 at Balliol College, Oxford, as the Oxonian Review of Books, and published between 2001 and 2008 as a termly print magazine featuring essays and reviews of recently published work in literature, politics, history, science, and the arts, written mostly by postgraduate students of the University of Oxford. It now also serves as a venue featuring creative writing work by both "University members and non-Oxford affiliates". As a term-based magazine, its Editor in Chief and the editor of the ORbits, shorter pieces published throughout the week during term time, "are appointed for a term". Editors have included Jimin Kang, Wilson Tarbox, Tom Cutterham, and Izzy Stuart.

In November 2008, the publication carried out a large recruitment drive in order to expand beyond Balliol College and reach a wider audience. It relaunched in January 2009 as a web-based magazine, publishing fortnightly during term time, and annually in print. It was also renamed The Oxonian Review in 2009. The magazine now also organises a series of events in Oxford, including speaker dinners, seminars, music evenings, film screenings, competitions—such as the poetry and the short story prizes,— and writers' workshops.

Predominantly a postgraduate-run magazine, The Oxonian Review began welcoming undergraduate students on its staff in 2022, and is encouraging towards submitted work that has "variety and experiment" rather than only "polish and perfection."

== Relevance ==
While The Oxonian Review publishes essays and reviews, and fiction and poetry, it is particularly noted for its interviews, including those of the Dutch animator and director Michaël Dudok de Wit, and of the poets Geoffrey Hill and Victoria Chang.

A number of reviews published in the magazine are frequently featured on the websites of the publishers and authors they focus on.

== See also ==
- Cherwell (newspaper)
- The Oxford Student
