= Haunted (Taylor Swift song) =

2010 song by Taylor Swift

Song by Taylor Swift

from the album Speak Now
- Released: October 25, 2010 November 8, 2011 (acoustic version)
- Genre: Arena rock; goth rock
- Length: 4:02
- Label: Big Machine
- Songwriter: Taylor Swift
- Producers: Taylor Swift; Nathan Chapman

Audio video
- "Haunted" on YouTube; "Haunted" (Acoustic version) on YouTube

"Haunted" is a song written and recorded by the American singer-songwriter Taylor Swift from her third studio album, Speak Now (2010). Inspired by an unsettling realization, the lyrics are about the harrowing feelings following the aftermath of a relationship. Produced by Swift and Nathan Chapman, "Haunted" is an arena rock and goth rock song with an orchestral arrangement; it incorporates a composite instrumental riff, a dramatic piano line, and dense percussion. Critics primarily praised the song for the vocals, songwriting, and production, though some deemed it lacking.

An acoustic version of "Haunted", originally included on the deluxe edition of Speak Now, was released for download by Big Machine Records on November 8, 2011. The song charted in Canada and the United States, where it received a gold certification as well as in Australia. Swift included the track on the set list of her Speak Now World Tour (2011–12) and performed it at certain dates of her later tours. It was also used in an episode of the American television series, True Blood. Following a 2019 dispute regarding the ownership of Swift's back catalog, she re-recorded the song as "Haunted (Taylor's Version)" for the album's re-recording, Speak Now (Taylor's Version) (2023).

== Background and release ==
Taylor Swift began development on her third studio album, Speak Now (2010), two years prior to its release. She conceived the album as a collection of songs about the things she had wanted to but was unable to do with the people she had met in real life. Speak Now was solely written by Swift, who co-produced it with Nathan Chapman. Swift was inspired to write "Haunted" after waking up of a disturbing realization of someone she was in love with drifting away. Because of that, she envisioned the music to "reflect the intensity of the emotion of the song is about", and brought Paul Buckmaster to arrange strings for it. Both of them recorded the strings at Capitol Studios in Los Angeles.

"Haunted" was included as the twelfth track on Speak Now, which was released on October 25, 2010, by Big Machine Records. An acoustic version of the song was also released as part of a Target-exclusive deluxe edition of the album. The track debuted and peaked at number 61 on the Canadian Hot 100 and number 63 on the US Billboard Hot 100. It also reached number eight on the US Country Digital Song Sales and spent five weeks on the chart. In August 2011, the song was used in an episode of the American television series, True Blood. In November, all of Speak Now's deluxe tracks became available for iTunes-exclusive download; Big Machine Records released the acoustic version of "Haunted" onto the platform on November 8. It re-entered the Billboard Hot 100 at number 98 on the issue of November 26, 2011.

Over the years, "Haunted" received certifications in some countries. The song was first certified gold by the Recording Industry Association of America on December 27, 2017, after reaching 500,000 units in the US. In November 2023, the acoustic version received a gold certification from the Australian Recording Industry Association for selling over 35,000 units in Australia; the original also received the certification in January 2024.

== Music and lyrics ==
"Haunted"
A 24-second sample of the chorus, where Swift sings about being afflicted over a failed romance before proceeding with the song's composite instrumental riff and dense percussion.

"Haunted" is 4 minutes and 2 seconds long. It has an orchestral arrangement containing sweeping violins, tense accents, and dramatic countermelodies. The production incorporates an alternating eighth-note line in the orchestral strings and the song's lead electric guitar, both of which mix to create an unabashed composite instrumental riff. It also features a dramatic piano line and heavy-sounding percussion with a persistent drum line.

Critics deemed the song one of Speak Now's tracks that experimented beyond Swift's country style. (Note: Attributed to Brittney McKenna of Billboard, Mary Sirosky and a staff of Consequence, John J. Moser of The Morning Call, Jon Caramanica of The New York Times, Sam Sodomsky of Pitchfork, and James Rettig of Stereogum) Nate Jones of Vulture described the music as "Evanescence-style goth-rock", while The New York Times' journalist Jon Caramanica called it "anthemic arena rock". The musicologist James E. Perone said that the song combined arena rock and contemporary styles with "big-production and musical theater". Chris Willman from Our Country stated that "Haunted" was musically the most dramatic on the album and thought the track had "Evanescence-qualities" to it. Matt Bjorke of Roughstock agreed and attributed the sentiment to the song's groove. Carena Liptak from Taste of Country thought the song recalled rock acts like the aforementioned band. Roisin O'Connor of The Independent wrote that a number of musical elements were too dramatic for Swift. Hannah Dailey of Billboard and James Rettig of Stereogum thought it veered into pop-punk. For The Morning Call, John J. Moser wrote that the song had "an almost emo vibe and dramatic approach".

The lyrics of "Haunted" takes place at the end of a relationship with Swift's character pleading for her lover to not leave her. The lover does depart from her, and she is tormented by the aftermath of their relationship: "Something's gone terribly wrong/You're all I wanted". She is also unable to forget the romance. PopMatters' Dave Heaton thought it was reminiscent of the film Vertigo (1958) and made the "breakup sound like death".

== Critical reception ==
Early and retrospective reviews for "Haunted" were generally positive. Critics commented on the production. Perone considered the song memorable and a highlight from Speak Now because of its composition. Caramanica chose "Haunted" as an example of Chapman's versatility as a producer on the album. Jane Song from Paste said that Swift "should use more string instruments in her music". Liptak believed that it was entertaining to see her exploring darker tones and thought it has the "perfect musical treatment" for the narrative but "not quite beyond the point of no salvation". Rettig wrote that how much the song would sound better if Swift executed it with a different production.

Swift's vocals received commentary. The Los Angeles Times' writer Ann Powers commended her on how she handled the song's climax. Moser considered "Haunted" one of the best tracks from the album and an "impressive switch-up" and thought Swift's voice "overwrought over-reaching and crackling" was effective. Willman, writing for Variety, believed that it was where she "had a touch of girlish shrillness in her voice" that although not technically skillful, "doesn't mean we can't feel a twinge of quaint nostalgia" of her excessive performance on the track. Matthew Horton from BBC Music wrote that Swift's "[ripping] with her overwrought inner Bonnie Tyler" on the track was "less convincing" and made it sound misplaced on the album. Jones said that she almost succeeded with "Haunted" but thought her voice was not strong enough to pull the "unrestrained performance" it needed.

Critics also discussed the songwriting and lyrics. Dailey deemed the song mysterious and quaint as well as a "banger" that "captures a darker strain of the magical themes" of the album. A staff member from Billboard deemed Swift's melodramatic songwriting on "Haunted" made it an "extremely compelling deep cut" and a standout because it subverted the formula of breakup songs. Sam Gnerre of the Los Angeles Daily News thought the song was too long but said that it still contained her great skill of "crafting hooky choruses, melodic bridges and appealing vocal arrangements". Hannah Mylrea from NME viewed the song a "younger sibling to Swift's fairy-tale epics" but felt it "[lacked] the nuance that some of her enchanting," ideal romances her other tracks have.

== Live performances ==
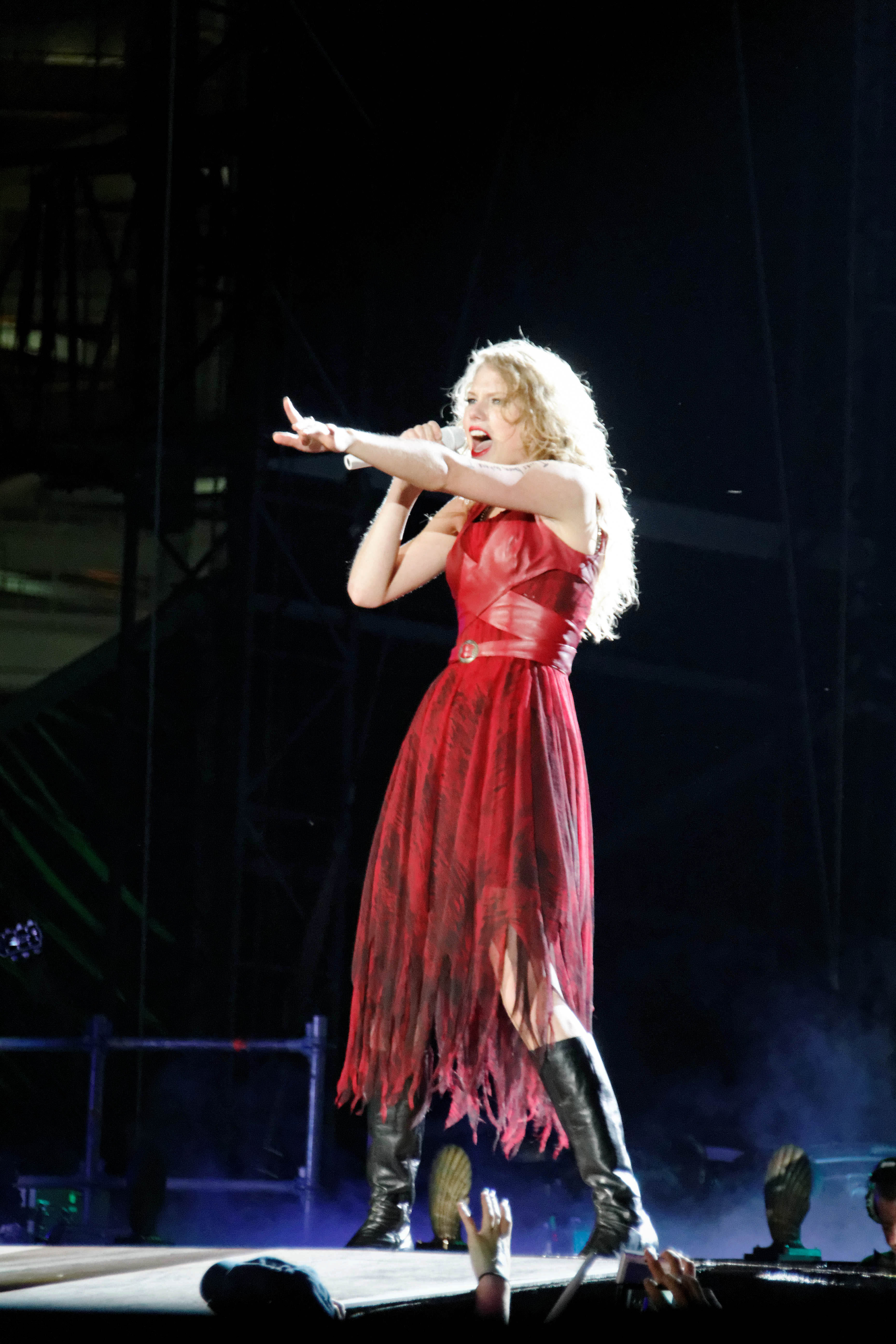
Swift performing "Haunted" on the Speak Now World Tour (2011–12)

On November 25, 2010, Swift performed "Haunted" during an NBC Speak Now Thanksgiving Special, which took place at the Psycho House in Universal Studios Hollywood; she was accompanied by a band with a string section. Rolling Stone's Larisha Paul praised the emotion and vulnerability of the performance. Swift included the song on the set list of her second headlining tour, Speak Now World Tour (2011–12), where aerial dancers dropped out of massive bells, which Swift hit with mallets as she performed. Kevin Coffey of Omaha World-Herald reported that the song's set was the biggest of the entire concert, and where Swift's voice was exceptionally strong at.

Swift would sing "Haunted" outside the set lists of her later tours. It was performed during the first Glendale show of her Red Tour (2013–14) and the second Landover show of her Reputation Stadium Tour (2018). In the Eras Tour (2023–24), Swift sang the song as a standalone track with an acoustic guitar on the first show in Detroit and as part of a mashup with her song "Exile" (2020) two times on the Sydney and Edinburgh stops of the tour. She also performed "Haunted" in a mashup with her song "Wonderland" (2014) during an Eras Tour show in Vancouver.

== Charts ==
Chart performance
Chart (2010–11)	Peak position
Canada Hot 100 (Billboard)	61
US Billboard Hot 100	63
US Country Digital Song Sales (Billboard)	8

== Certifications ==
Certifications
Region	Certification	Certified units/sales
Australia (ARIA)	Gold	35,000^{‡}
Australia (ARIA) Acoustic version	Gold	35,000^{‡}
United States (RIAA)	Gold	500,000^{‡}
^{‡} Sales+streaming figures based on certification alone.

== "Haunted (Taylor's Version)" ==
"Haunted (Taylor's Version)"

Song by Taylor Swift

from the album Speak Now (Taylor's Version)
- Released: July 7, 2023
- Studio: Kitty Committee Studios (London, England); EBC Studios (London, England) (strings); Prime Recording (Nashville, TN); Blackbird Studio (Nashville, TN)
- Length: 4:05
- Label: Republic
- Songwriter: Taylor Swift
- Producers: Taylor Swift; Christopher Rowe

Lyric video
- "Haunted (Taylor's Version)" on YouTube

Swift departed from Big Machine and signed a new contract with Republic Records in 2018. She began re-recording her first six studio albums in November 2020. The decision followed a 2019 dispute between Swift and the talent manager Scooter Braun, who acquired Big Machine Records, over the masters of Swift's albums that the label had released. By re-recording the albums, Swift had full ownership of the new masters, which enabled her to encourage licensing of her re-recorded songs for commercial use in hopes of substituting the Big Machine-owned masters. She denoted the re-recordings with a "Taylor's Version" subtitle.

The re-recording of "Haunted" is titled "Haunted (Taylor's Version)" and was included on Speak Now (Taylor's Version), the re-recording of Speak Now, which was released on July 7, 2023. The song has more reverberation and three additional seconds compared to the original. Kate Solomon from the i said that the "high drama" of the re-recorded track gave her a new appreciation for it. "Haunted (Taylor's Version)" peaked within the countries of the Philippines (25), Singapore (30), New Zealand (40), Australia (48), and Canada (55). The song debuted and peaked at number 50 on the Billboard Hot 100 and number 22 on Hot Country Songs. It also reached number 83 in the United Kingdom's Audio Streaming Chart. In May 2025, the track was certified gold by Pro-Música Brasil for surpassing 20,000 units in Brazil.

=== Credits ===
Adapted from Speak Now (Taylor's Version) digital album inline notes

Studios

- Swift's vocals recorded at Kitty Committee Studio (London)
- Strings recorded at EBC (London)
- Mixed at MixStar Studios (Virginia Beach, Virginia)
- Digitally edited and additionally engineered at Prime Recording (Nashville, Tennessee)
- Mastered at Sterling Sound (Edgewater, New Jersey)

Personnel

- Taylor Swift – lead vocals, background vocals, songwriting, production
- Christopher Rowe – production, vocal engineering
- Mike Meadows – acoustic guitar, Hammond B3, mandolin
- Amos Heller – bass guitar
- David Cook – piano
- Matt Billingslea – drums, percussion
- Max Bernstein – electric guitar
- Paul Sidoti – electric guitar
- London Contemporary Orchestra – strings
  - First violin – Anna Ovsyanikova, Antonia Kasel, Charlotte Reid, Galya Bisengalieva, Natalia Kloude, Zara Benyounes
  - Second violin – Anna De Bruin, Charis Genson, Eloisa-Fleur Thom, Guy Button, Nicole Crespo O'Donoghue, Nicole Stokes
  - Viola – Clifton Harrison, Matthew Kettle, Stephanie Edmundson, Zoe Matthews
  - Cello – Jonny Byers, Max Ruisi, Oliver Coates
  - Double bass – Dave Brown
  - String recording – Jeremy Murphy
- David Payne – engineering
- Derek Garten – digital editing, engineering, programming
- Lowell Reynolds – additional engineering, digital editing
- Serban Ghenea – mixing
- Bryce Bordone – mix engineering
- Randy Merrill – mastering

=== Charts ===
Chart performance for Taylor's version
Chart (2023)	Peak position
Australia (ARIA)	48
Canada Hot 100 (Billboard)	55
Global 200 (Billboard)	53
New Zealand (Recorded Music NZ)	40
Philippines (Billboard)	25
Singapore (RIAS)	30
UK Streaming (OCC)	83
US Billboard Hot 100	50
US Hot Country Songs (Billboard)	22

=== Certification ===
Certifications
Region	Certification	Certified units/sales
Brazil (Pro-Música Brasil)	Gold	20,000^{‡}
^{‡} Sales+streaming figures based on certification alone.
