= Innocent (Taylor Swift song) =

2010 song by Taylor Swift

Song by Taylor Swift

from the album Speak Now
- Released: October 25, 2010
- Genre: Alternative country; folk-pop
- Length: 5:02
- Label: Big Machine
- Songwriter: Taylor Swift
- Producers: Taylor Swift; Nathan Chapman

Audio video
- "Innocent" on YouTube

"Innocent" is a song written and recorded by the American singer-songwriter Taylor Swift from her third studio album, Speak Now (2010). Produced by Swift and Nathan Chapman, the song was written in response to Kanye West's interruption of her acceptance speech at the 2009 MTV Video Music Awards, feeling the need to sympathize with him after the public outrage he received. A gentle alternative country and folk-pop ballad with tender vocals, its lyrics are about a protagonist's encouragement of someone who has committed wrongdoings, claiming them to hold innocence and believing that they could redeem themself.

Following the album's release, the song peaked at numbers 27 and 53 on the US Billboard Hot 100 and Canadian Hot 100 charts respectively. Music critics gave "Innocent" mixed reviews; some viewed the song as a sympathetic message and praised Swift's songwriting, but others criticized it as patronizing and condescending. Swift performed the song live at the following year's MTV Video Music Awards on September 12, a month prior to the release of Speak Now, as a means of putting the controversy behind her and West.

The debate over the message of "Innocent" started to affect Swift's "America's Sweetheart" reputation, which resonated into both Swift's and West's public images and their feud throughout later years. A re-recorded version of the song, titled "Innocent (Taylor's Version)", was released as part of Swift's re-recorded album Speak Now (Taylor's Version) (2023).

== Background and writing ==
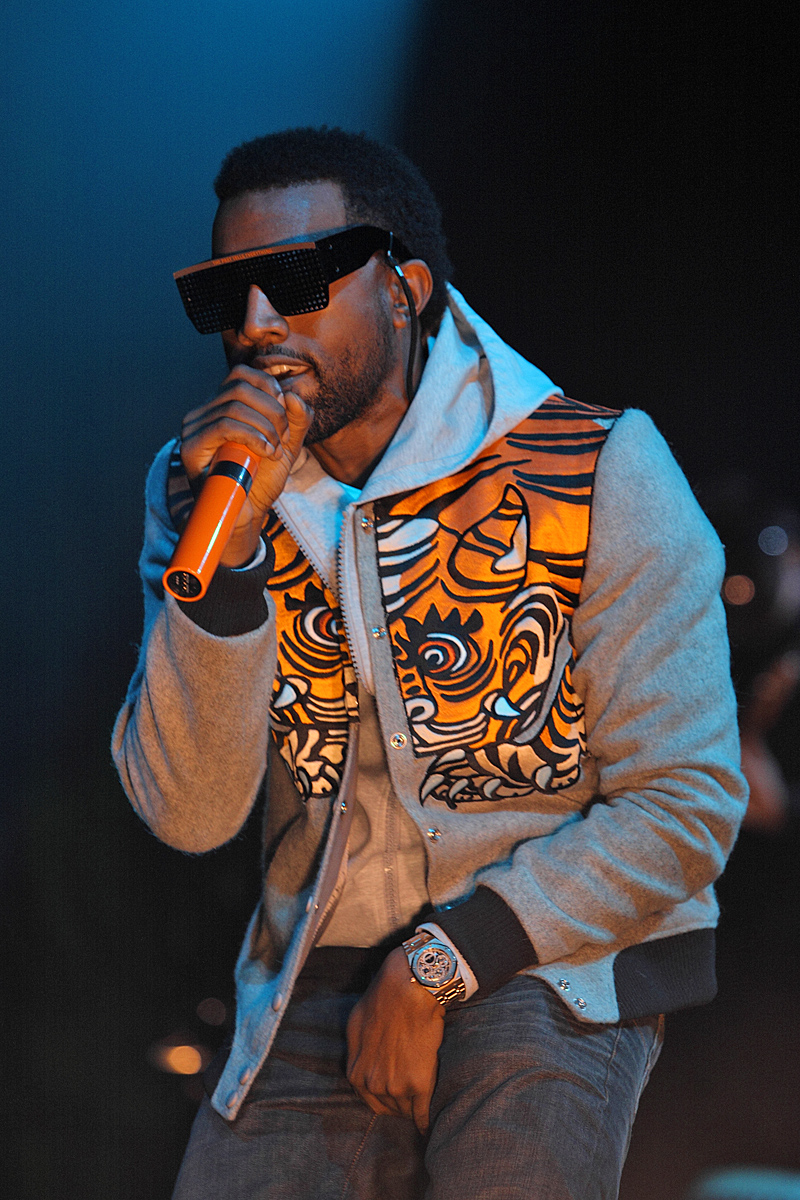
Swift wrote "Innocent" inspired by Kanye West's interruption of her acceptance speech at the 2009 MTV Video Music Awards.

Taylor Swift wrote all tracks on her third studio album Speak Now (2010), by herself. According to Swift, the album is a collection of songs about the things she had wanted to say to the people she had met in real life but did not. In the liner notes for Speak Now, Swift explained that every song on the album is an "open letter" to someone in her life, "telling them what I meant to tell them in person". She also noted that one song in particular is addressed to "someone I forgive for what he said in front of the whole world". At the 2009 MTV Video Music Awards, during Swift's acceptance speech for winning Best Female Video, the American rapper Kanye West interrupted her, protesting that Beyoncé had "one of the best videos of all time". Public opinion after the incident turned against West; former US president Barack Obama called him a "jackass". West said on the social media platform that he "bled hard" because of his actions, and went into a hiatus.

After the incident, Swift told New York magazine that while she knew people "expected me to write a song about [West]", she felt it was important to "write a song to him". In an interview with Billboard, she said she wrote the song between February and June 2010. Swift recalled that the incident made her stay silent for a while because it was "a huge, intense thing in my life that resonated for a long time". When she wrote "Innocent", she had come to a place of mind where she could talk about it. As she had to take time to process the emotions ensued from the incident, "Innocent", which took her six months to write, took longer for her to finish than other tracks, which she said usually took "about 30 minutes". She reflected that writing the song "taught [her] a lot about being able to step back from a situation you don't know what to do with, and put [herself] into somebody else's shoes". As a result, "Innocent" is her expression of sympathy to West, after the public outrage he received.

== Music and lyrics ==
Musically, "Innocent" is a gentle alternative country and folk-pop ballad, in which Swift performs with tender vocals. Musicologist James E. Perone remarked that it stands out from other pop ballads because of Swift's use of "a high degree of rhythmic syncopation in her delivery". The lyrics of "Innocent" see a protagonist sympathizing with a man who has committed wrongdoings. Although the man in question has suffered from self-doubt because of his actions, in the eyes of Swift's character, his "strings of lights are still bright". The narrator tells the man, "32 and still growing up now/Who you are is not what you did." The lyrics feature imagery associated with childhood innocence and simplicity, such as "lunchbox days" and "firefly catching days". According to The Wall Street Journal, the track further alludes to the pitfalls of fame, "Lost your balance on a tightrope/It's never too late to get it back."

Perone summed up the track as "a statement of support and encouragement". According to biographer Liv Spencer, "Innocent" is a continuation of the theme on "Never Grow Up", a Speak Now track about leaving childhood behind. In the lyrics, the narrator assures that even if one's "firefly catchin' days" are long behind them, they still carry a little bit of that innocence. The song mourns the loss of innocence, but offers a hopeful perspective that one could be "brand new" again. In Esquire, Maura Johnston noticed references to the 2009 MTV Video Music Awards incident; for example, the lyrics reference the month September, which was the month the awards show took place; and mention the age of the man in question as 32, West's age at the time. Johnston remarked that for those who are unaware of the celebrity surrounding Swift–West, the track can be interpreted as "a simple lament of a lost love, or a former friend being forgiven".

== Release and live performances ==
"Innocent" is the 11th track on Speak Now, which was released on October 25, 2010, through Big Machine Records. After the album's release, the track debuted and peaked at number 27 on the US Billboard Hot 100 and number 53 on the Canadian Hot 100.

Swift debuted "Innocent" with a live performance at the 2010 MTV Video Music Awards held on September 12, 2010. Addressing the West controversy at the past year's MTV Video Music Awards, the performance started with background clips showing the incident. Swift then sang the track as she played an acoustic guitar and sat on a couch; she afterwards performed the song barefoot. Time said that she sang the track with "a stormy, dreary background straight out of the tornado scene in The Wizard of Oz". Swift said the performance was to put behind the 2009 MTV Video Music Awards controversy. In an interview with the Belfast Telegraph, Swift said she was "grateful" to perform at the show because it was congruent with what she wanted to do with Speak Now: "[You] need to say what it is that you feel when you know what it is you feel – at that moment." When asked why she did not choose to perform the lead single, "Mine", to promote it better, she said, "I performed a song nobody had heard before, and I'm proud of that. Because it was the right thing to say." In 2023, Swift embarked on her sixth concert tour, the Eras Tour, which contained a segment of "surprise songs" where she perform random songs from her discography. On November 24, Swift sang "Innocent" as a "surprise song" during a concert in Sao Paulo, as part of the tour.

== Reception and aftermath ==
The song garnered mixed reception from music critics. After Swift's 2010 MTV performance, some viewed the song as sympathetic toward West, but others deemed it patronizing and Swift self-righteous. A Los Angeles Times critic called the lyrics "slams disguised as 'forgiveness'", and another from The New York Times referred to the song as "petty". Jonathan Keefe of Slant Magazine criticized the track as a "patronizing, condescending sermon", and saw Swift as hypocritical for writing a song calling out someone else's negative remarks when her songwriting typically criticized other people. Chris Willman in New York said that in "Innocent", Swift casts herself in a mature, maternal light: "she really plays mother to a baby." Johnston said that it "wasn't the most gracious act of forgiveness in history" and took issue with the lyrics detailing "a 20-year-old telling a 32-year-old that he's still growing up", which she deemed a sign of Swift feeling "a sense of satisfaction at being 'the better person'". The public debate started to affect Swift's "America's Sweetheart" public image and resonated for a long time, continuing into 2016, when she and West got involved in another controversy in which West released the single "Famous", including lyrical parts that Swift had not consented to.

On a more positive side, Allison Stewart of The Washington Post described "Innocent" as a "small masterpiece of passive-aggressiveness" in her review of the album. Writing for the Chicago Tribune, Chrissie Dickinson heralded the track as Swift's "greatest maturation as an artist" among the songs previewed prior to the album's release, finding it deeply sympathetic. In The A.V. Club, Steven Hyden, while acknowledging the lyrical content as "a poison dart [dipped] in sugar" aimed at West, considered "Innocent" one of Speak Now's highlights: "Swift's niftiest trick is being at her most likeable when she's indulging in such overt nastiness." Other album reviews from BBC Music's Matthew Horton and Entertainment Weekly's Leah Greenblatt picked "Innocent" as one of the album tracks that showed Swift's maturing songwriting about themes other than love and romance.

Reviewing the MTV awards performance, Melinda Newman of HitFix gave it a B; Newman praised the song for balancing personal details and universal appeal with its "beautiful" lyrics, but took issue with Swift's live vocals as weak. In NJ.com, Tris McCall appreciated the ballad's sympathetic message and commended Swift as the awards night's "big winner". The country-music journalist and CMT editorial director Chet Flippo praised Swift's MTV rendition of "Innocent" for expressing her feelings about a real person "in an artful way" and compared her practice to other country-music legends: "Sometimes forgiveness is the sweetest revenge, and it's what she achieved." The music entrepreneur and business instructor Jeff Rabhan agreed; he lauded Swift for delivering her thoughts in a "positive and professional" manner, and highlighting her artistic ability.

== Charts ==
Chart performance
Chart (2010)	Peak position
Canada Hot 100 (Billboard)	53
US Billboard Hot 100	27
US Country Digital Song Sales (Billboard)	2

== "Innocent (Taylor's Version)" ==
"Innocent (Taylor's Version)"

Song by Taylor Swift

from the album Speak Now (Taylor's Version)
- Released: July 7, 2023
- Studio: Blackbird Studio (Nashville, TN); Kitty Committee Studio (London, England); Prime Recording (Nashville, TN)
- Genre: Country pop
- Length: 5:01
- Label: Republic
- Songwriter: Taylor Swift
- Producers: Taylor Swift; Christopher Rowe

Lyric video
- "Innocent (Taylor's Version)" on YouTube

After signing a new contract with Republic Records, Swift began re-recording her first six studio albums in November 2020. The decision came after the public 2019 dispute between Swift and the talent manager Scooter Braun, who acquired Big Machine Records, including the masters of Swift's albums the label had released. By re-recording her catalog, Swift had full ownership of the new masters, including the copyright licensing of her songs, devaluing the Big Machine-owned masters.

A re-recorded version of "Innocent", titled "Innocent (Taylor's Version)", was released on July 7, 2023, via Republic Records, as part of Speak Now (Taylor's Version), Swift's third re-recorded album.

=== Personnel ===
Adapted from Speak Now (Taylor's Version) digital album inline notes

- Taylor Swift – vocals, background vocals, songwriter, producer
- Christopher Rowe – producer, vocal engineer
- David Payne – recording engineer
- Lowell Reynolds – assistant recording engineer, editor
- Derek Garten – engineer, editor, programming
- Serban Ghenea – mixing
- Bryce Bordone – mix engineer
- Randy Merrill – mastering
- Matt Billingslea – drums, percussion
- Amos Heller – bass guitar
- Paul Sidoti – electric guitar
- Mike Meadows – acoustic guitar, background vocals
- Max Bernstein – electric guitar, synthesizer, strings
- David Cook – piano
- Caitlin Evanson – background vocals

=== Charts ===
Chart performance for Taylor's version
Chart (2023)	Peak position
Australia (ARIA)	75
Canada Hot 100 (Billboard)	63
Global 200 (Billboard)	79
US Billboard Hot 100	63
US Hot Country Songs (Billboard)	28
