= Speak Now =

Studio album by Taylor Swift
- Released: October 25, 2010
- Recorded: 2009–2010
- Studios: Aimeeland (Nashville); Blackbird (Nashville); Pain in the Art (Nashville); Starstruck (Nashville); Capitol (Hollywood); Stonehurst (Bowling Green)
- Genres: Country pop; country rock; pop rock; power pop
- Length: 67:28
- Label: Big Machine
- Producers: Nathan Chapman; Taylor Swift

Taylor Swift chronology
Fearless (2008)	Speak Now (2010)	Speak Now World Tour – Live (2011)

Singles from Speak Now
- 1. "Mine" Released: August 4, 2010; 2. "Back to December" Released: November 15, 2010; 3. "Mean" Released: March 7, 2011; 4. "The Story of Us" Released: April 7, 2011; 5. "Sparks Fly" Released: July 18, 2011; 6. "Ours" Released: December 5, 2011

Speak Now is the third studio album by the American singer-songwriter Taylor Swift. It was released on October 25, 2010, through Big Machine Records. Swift wrote the album entirely herself while touring in 2009–2010 to reflect on her transition from adolescence to adulthood.

Swift framed Speak Now as a loose concept album of unsaid confessions she wanted to deliver to the subjects of her songs. Using confessional songwriting, the album is mostly about heartbreak and reflections on broken relationships, and some tracks were inspired by Swift's rising stardom in the public eye to address her critics and adversaries. She and Nathan Chapman produced Speak Now, which combines country pop, country rock, pop rock, and power pop. Its songs incorporate prominent rock stylings, and their melodies are characterized by acoustic instruments intertwined with chiming electric guitars, dynamic drums, and orchestral strings.

After the album's release, Swift embarked on the Speak Now World Tour from February 2011 to March 2012. The album was supported by six singles, including the US Billboard Hot 100 top-ten singles "Mine" and "Back to December", and the US Hot Country Songs number ones "Sparks Fly" and "Ours". Speak Now peaked atop the charts and received multi-platinum certifications in Australia, Canada, and New Zealand. In the United States, it sold one million copies within its first week, spent six weeks at number one on the Billboard 200, and was certified six-times platinum for surpassing six million album-equivalent units by the Recording Industry Association of America.

Music critics generally praised Speak Now for its radio-friendly melodies and emotional engagement. Some critics thought the lyrics represented Swift's maturity in early adulthood, but several others criticized the confrontational tracks as shallow. At the 54th Annual Grammy Awards in 2012, Speak Now was nominated for Best Country Album, and its single "Mean" won Best Country Song and Best Country Solo Performance. The album appeared in 2010s decade-end lists by Billboard and Spin, and Rolling Stone ranked it in their lists "The 50 Greatest Female Albums of All Time" (2012) and "The 250 Greatest Albums of the 21st Century So Far" (2025). Following the 2019 dispute regarding the ownership of Swift's back catalog, she released the re-recorded album Speak Now (Taylor's Version) in 2023, and the master recording ownership of Speak Now was acquired by Swift in 2025.

== Background ==
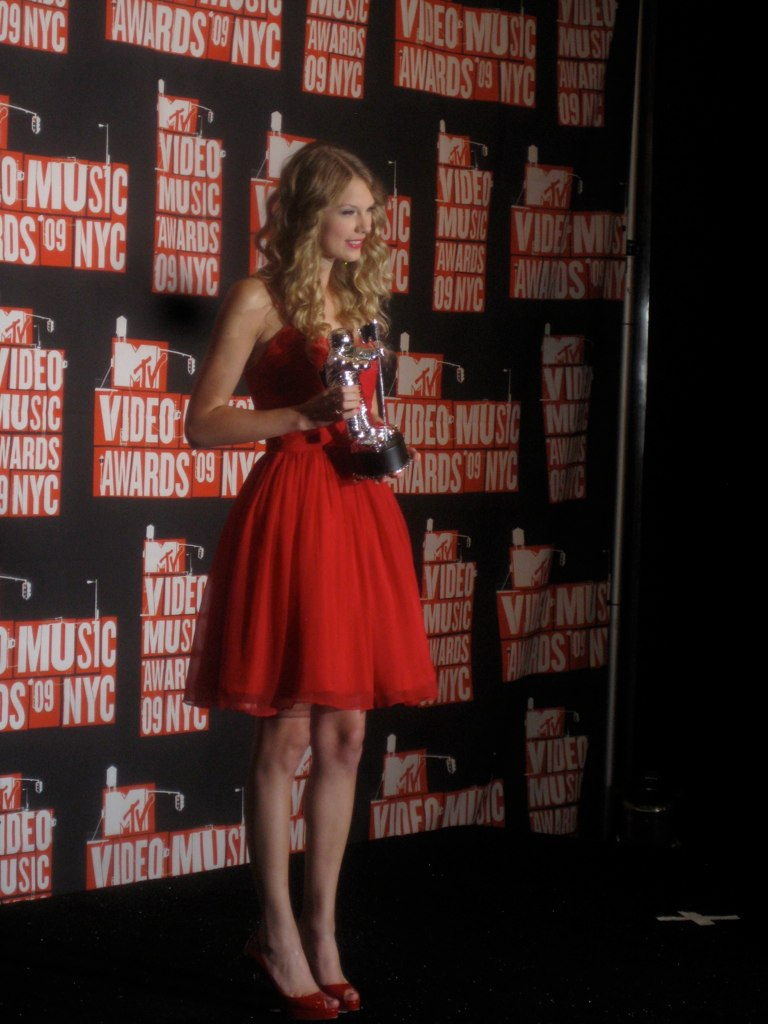
Swift at the 2009 MTV Video Music Awards

Taylor Swift released hеr second studio album Fearless through Nashville-based Big Machine Records in November 2008. The album spent 11 weeks at number one on the US Billboard 200, the longest chart run for a female country music artist. It was the best-selling album of 2009 in the United States, making then-20-year-old Swift the youngest artist to have an annual best-seller since Nielsen SoundScan began tracking album sales in 1991. Two of the album's singles, "Love Story" and "You Belong with Me", performed well on both country and pop radio and brought Swift to mainstream prominence. "Love Story" was the first country song to reach number one on the Pop Songs chart and "You Belong with Me" was the first country song to top the all-genre Radio Songs chart. At the 52nd Annual Grammy Awards in February 2010, Fearless won Album of the Year and Best Country Album, and its single "White Horse" won Best Female Country Vocal Performance and Best Country Song.

The success of Fearless made Swift one of country music's biggest stars to crossover into the mainstream market. At the 2009 MTV Video Music Awards, where Swift won Best Female Video for "You Belong with Me", the rapper Kanye West interrupted her acceptance speech; the incident received widespread media coverage and became known as "Kanyegate". At the 52nd Annual Grammy Awards, Swift sang "You Belong with Me" and "Rhiannon" with Stevie Nicks; some critics commented Swift performed with weak vocals. MTV News commented the MTV Awards incident transformed Swift into a "bona-fide mainstream celebrity", and The New York Times said it was refreshing to see a talented singer-songwriter like Swift "make the occasional flub". Swift began writing for her third studio album immediately after she released Fearless and continued during her Fearless Tour in 2009 and 2010.

== Writing and lyrics ==
Because of her extensive touring schedule, Swift wrote her third album alone: "I'd get my best ideas at 3:00 a.m. in Arkansas, and I didn't have a co-writer around so I would just finish it. That would happen again in New York and then again in Boston and that would happen again in Nashville." Inspired by her growth into adulthood, she conceived Speak Now as a loose concept album about the things she wanted to tell certain people she had met but never had a chance to. As with her songwriting on previous albums, Swift strove to convey emotional honesty with details as specifically as possible, believing it is important for a songwriter to do so. She described her songs as "diary entries" about her emotions that helped her navigate adulthood. Swift chose not to follow the trend of making increasingly sexualized music by artists of her age and believed such a path would be incongruent with her artistic vision. (Note: In a 2010 interview with Glamour, when the interviewer asked, "And you hear artists say things like, 'When I turned 21, the record label made me over into a sexualized creature'. Could you see yourself going in that direction?", Swift responded, "I don't ever look down on people for the way they choose to have fun; it's just not necessarily the way I like to have fun".)

"Back to December"
The orchestral string-laden "Back to December" is about Swift's confession of her wrongdoings and plea for an ex-lover's forgiveness, departing from the starry-eyed romance of her previous songs.

Departing from Fearless's theme of fairy tales and starry-eyed romance, Speak Now explores introspection and reflections on broken relationships. By avoiding sexual references in its songs, the album kept Swift's "good-girl" image intact. (Note: In scholar Adriane Brown's view, Swift's past albums are also about romantic, nonsexual relationships, which was congruent with her public image and identity as a white, feminine, innocent, middle-class American girl.) Some tracks were inspired by Swift's public experience, including past relationships with high-profile celebrities, which received media attention during the album's promotional rollout. The confessional lyrics of Speak Now are more direct and confrontational than those on Swift's past albums. On "Back to December", she asks an ex-lover to forgive her wrongdoings. Swift wrote the title track, "Speak Now", after hearing a friend's ex-boyfriend was marrying another woman; in the lyrics, the protagonist crashes the ex-boyfriend's wedding and tries to halt it. "Dear John" narrates a devastating relationship of a 19-year-old female narrator who accuses a much-older man of manipulating her with "dark, twisted games". Swift's encounter with an ex-lover at an awards show, where they ignored each other despite Swift feeling a need to speak to him inspired "The Story of Us". On "Better than Revenge", Swift affirms vengeance against a romantic rival who is known for "the things she does on the mattress".

Romantic optimism is another theme of the album. The opening track "Mine" is about Swift's hope of attaining happiness despite her tendency to "run from love" to avoid heartbreak. It was the first song she included on the track list because it represents her then-new perspective of romance. Swift had written "Sparks Fly"—a song about dangerous hints of love at first sight—before she released her 2006 debut album, Taylor Swift. She re-recorded the song for Speak Now after she received fan request to release it at the 2010 CMA Music Festival. "Enchanted" describes the aftermath of an encounter with a special person without knowing whether the infatuation would be reciprocated. "Haunted" is about romantic obsession and "Last Kiss" explores the lingering feelings after a breakup. On "Long Live", Swift expresses gratitude to her fans and bandmates. The lyrics of "Enchanted" and "Long Live" incorporate high-school-prom and fairy-tale imagery that recalls the youthful optimism of Fearless.

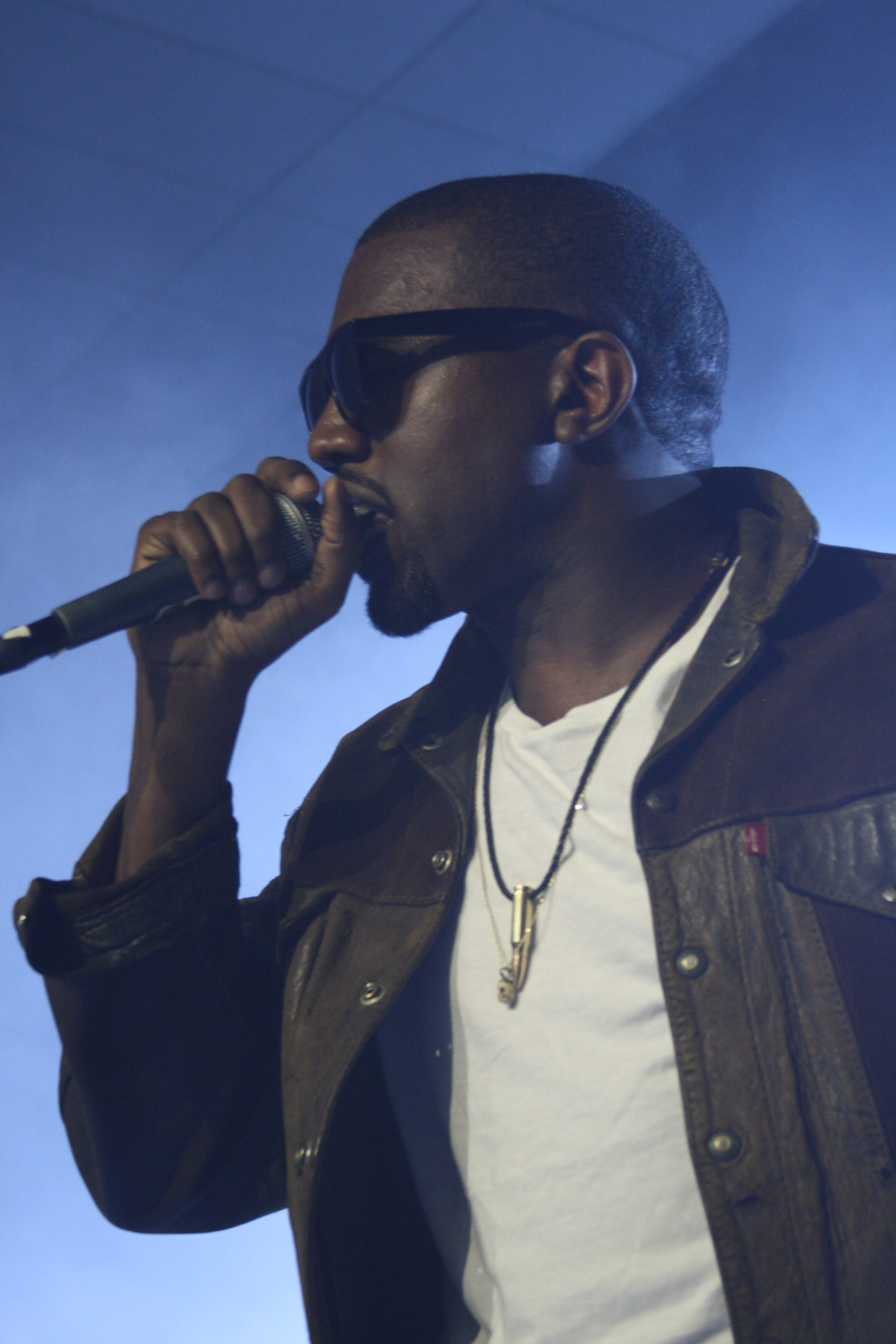
The 2009 MTV Awards incident with Kanye West (pictured) inspired "Innocent".

Besides love and romance, Swift wrote about self-perception. "Never Grow Up" is a contemplation of her childhood, adulthood, and future. The self-aware "Mean", in which Swift sings about facing a man who had tried to take her down, was inspired by her detractors. Because of her confessional songwriting, the media became invested in Swift's personal life and believed each song is about a real person: an ex-lover, a friend, or an enemy. Although Swift was interested to hear the response from the people to whom she dedicated the songs, she did not publicly name them and believed they would realize this themselves. She did reveal that Kanye West, who interrupted Swift's acceptance speech at the 2009 MTV Video Music Awards, was the subject of "Innocent". In the track, Swift sings about forgiving a man who wronged her; according to Esquire, the track can be interpreted as "a simple lament of a lost love, or a former friend being forgiven".

Swift wrote as many as 40 songs and by early 2010, she had begun to select songs for the album. To ensure the album would be coherent, she played the songs to her family, friends, and the producer Nathan Chapman, who had worked with Swift on both of her previous albums. Swift chose Enchanted as a working title but Big Machine Records' founder Scott Borchetta recommended Swift choose a different title, deeming Enchanted unfit for the album's mature perspective. (Note: Borchetta reportedly said to Swift; "Taylor, this record isn't about fairy tales and high school anymore. That's not where you're at.") She settled on the title Speak Now because she thought it best captures the album's essence: "I think it's such a metaphor, that moment where it's almost too late, and you've got to either say what it is you are feeling or deal with the consequences forever ... And this album seemed like the opportunity for me to speak now or forever hold my peace." Swift finalized the track list by June 2010.

== Composition ==
=== Production ===
Swift recorded much of Speak Now with Chapman at his Pain in the Art Studio in Nashville. Although Fearless's commercial success allowed Swift to engage a larger group of producers, she worked solely with Chapman because she believed they had a productive relationship. The recording process started with a demo; Swift recorded vocals and played guitar, and Chapman sang background vocals and played other instruments. After arranging the demos, they approached other engineers and musicians to tweak some elements, including overdubs and programmed drums. The first track Chapman produced with Swift on Speak Now is "Mine", which they recorded within five hours.

Because of his artistic autonomy, Chapman said he was responsible for "60 percent of the music on the album, including 90 percent of the guitars". Much of his production for Speak Now is identical to that for Fearless; he programmed the drums with Toontrack's software Superior Drummer, played drums on the Roland Fantom G6 keyboard, added electric guitars to the arrangements, recorded Swift's vocals with an Avantone CV12 microphone and his background vocals with a Shure SM57, produced the bass with an Avalon VT737 preamplifier, and used Endless Audio's CLASP System to synchronize his editing on Pro Tools and Logic. To make the sounds align with country music stylings, Chapman worked with other Nashville musicians to replace the programmed drums with live drums and add acoustic instruments such as fiddle. For instance, Chapman asked Steve Marcantonio to cut down programmed drums on "Mine" at Blackbird Studio in Nashville. For some tracks, including "Back to December", Swift and her team went to Capitol Studios in Los Angeles to record string orchestration.

After recording finished, Justin Niebank mixed the album on Pro Tools at Blackbird Studio. Within three weeks, Niebank finished mixing 17 tracks including 14 on the standard edition and three bonus tracks on the deluxe edition. Because Swift wanted Speak Now to be a direct communication with her audience, Niebank infused monoaural reverberation inspired by 1950s and 1960s music in the mix to evoke a "vintage" and "retro" vibe that, according to Niebank, brought a sense of authenticity. Hank Williams mastered the recordings. Because much of Speak Now was recorded and mixed in Nashville, Niebank believed the album stood out among popular records that were manipulated with contemporaneous technologies Auto-Tune and Melodyne. Although Chapman was responsible for much of the production, he said Swift's co-production credit was well-deserved: "We were really a team, very collaborative."

=== Music ===
"Mine"
Speak Now is primarily a country pop album with radio-friendly production, as exemplified by its lead single "Mine".

Speak Now features a country pop sound with prominent mainstream music elements, a style that had characterized Taylor Swift and Fearless, and is typified by the lead single and opening track, "Mine"; The Daily Telegraph's James Lachno described the sound as "country bubblegum-pop". The songs' arrangements are similar to those in Swift's first two albums, but the instruments' textures are more dense and evoke strong pop and rock influences. According to the musicologist James E. Perone, the rock textures of Speak Now are derived from 1970s and 1980s styles such as new wave rock and arena rock. There were disagreements over the album's genre classification, with critics categorizing it as country rock, pop rock, and power pop. The music critic Ann Powers, in a review for the Los Angeles Times, described the album's sound as an extension of country-pop towards alternative rock and bubblegum pop, with its tracks incorporating styles from "lush strings of Céline-style kitsch-pop to Americana banjo to countrypolitan electric guitar".

The song structures feature climatic build-ups, catchy pop melodies, and memorable hooks, characterized by chiming guitars, dynamic drums, and powerful choruses. The banjo-led bluegrass track "Mean" is the only song that critics regarded as purely country music. "Sparks Fly" has an arena-rock and pop-rock production with guitars and subtle fiddles, and "Speak Now" is an acoustic guitar-driven pop song with a 1950s rock chorus. "The Story of Us" and "Better than Revenge" are electric-guitar-driven pop-punk songs; the former contains influences of arena rock, dance-pop, and new wave, instrumented by electric guitar riffs and subdued mandolin; and the latter features soaring electric guitars and distorted vocals, evoking 1980s hard rock but with more melodic accessibility. The arena-rock and goth-rock number "Haunted" incorporates a dramatic recurring string section. The closing track "Long Live" is a heartland rock song featuring girl-group harmonies and chiming rock guitars.

The remaining tracks of Speak Now are ballads. "Back to December" is a gentle, orchestral, string-laden power ballad. "Dear John" is a slow-burning, bluesy, country-pop song with electric guitar licks. The guitar ballad "Never Grow Up" incorporates an understated production that accompanies its wistful lyrics. On "Enchanted", the acoustic guitar crescendos after each refrain and leads up to a harmony-layered coda at the end. "Innocent" and "Last Kiss" incorporate sparse instruments; the latter is a slow-tempo waltz with breathy vocals. "If This Was a Movie", a bonus song on the deluxe edition and the only song not written solely by Swift, (Note: Although "If This Was a Movie" (written by Swift and Martin Johnson) is on the deluxe edition of Speak Now, the 14-track standard edition was solely written by Swift, and thus the album is agreed upon by the press as self-penned by Swift.) is a fast-paced ballad with a recurring guitar riff and simple harmonies.

== Release and promotion ==
Swift announced Speak Now on July 20, 2010, in a live stream on Ustream. Big Machine Records released the lead single "Mine" to US country radio and digital download sites on August 4, 2010. The single peaked at number three on the US Billboard Hot 100 and was certified triple platinum by the Recording Industry Association of America (RIAA). It reached number six in Japan, number seven in Canada, and number nine in Australia. On August 18, Swift released the album's cover art, which depicts Swift with curly hair and red lipstick twirling in a deep-purple gown. On September 15, she announced a Target-exclusive deluxe edition; the deluxe edition cover features a red gown in place of the purple gown on the standard edition cover. Starting from October 4, 2010, Big Machine released one Speak Now track each week on the iTunes Store as part of a three-week countdown campaign; "Speak Now" was released on October 5, followed by "Back to December" on October 12 and "Mean" on October 19. On October 22, Xfinity premiered a preview of "The Story of Us".

Big Machine released the standard and deluxe editions of Speak Now on October 25, 2010. The Target-exclusive deluxe edition contains 14 songs of the standard; the bonus tracks "Ours", "If This Was a Movie", and "Superman"; acoustic versions of "Back to December" and "Haunted"; a "pop mix" of "Mine"; a 30-minute behind-the-scenes video for "Mine"; and the music video for "Mine". The deluxe edition was released to other retailers on January 17, 2012. To bolster sales of the album, Swift had partnerships with Starbucks, Sony Electronics, Walmart, and Jakks Pacific. In October 2011, Swift partnered with Elizabeth Arden, Inc. to release her fragrance brand "Wonderstruck", whose name references the lyrics of "Enchanted".

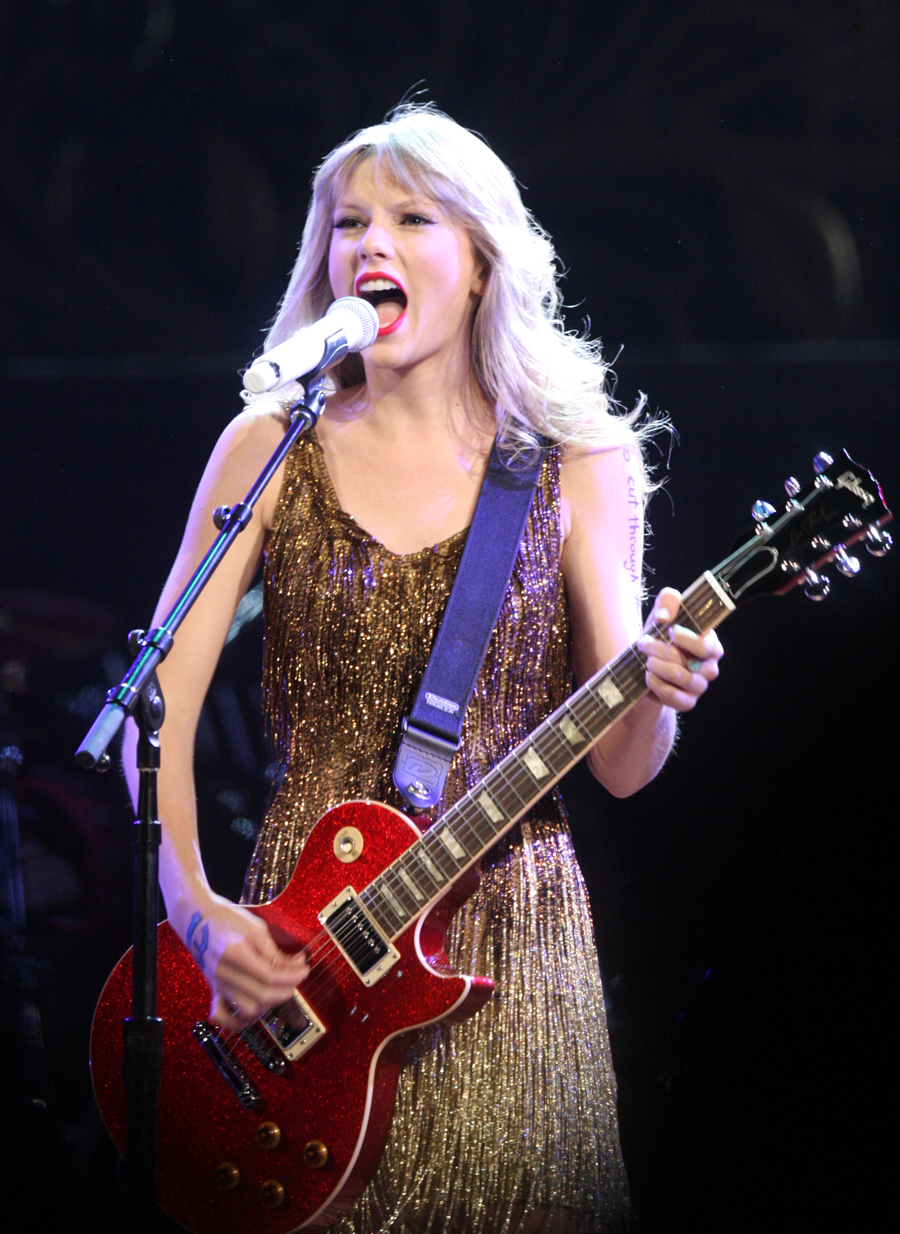
Swift on the Speak Now World Tour in 2012

To further promote Speak Now, Swift appeared on magazine covers and conducted press interviews. She performed "Innocent" at the 2010 MTV Video Music Awards. Her other performances at awards shows include the Country Music Association Awards and the American Music Awards in 2010; the Academy of Country Music Awards and the Country Music Association Awards in 2011. She also performed at a benefit concert for the Country Music Hall of Fame, held at Club Nokia L.A. In Europe, Swift performed on BBC Radio 2 and X Factor Italy, and she had interviews with BBC Radio 1 in the United Kingdom and NRJ in France. She embarked on a promotional tour in Japan, where she appeared on the television shows SMAPxSMAP and Music Station. Her round of American television shows included Today, Late Show with David Letterman, The Ellen DeGeneres Show, Live with Regis and Kelly, and Dancing with the Stars. She also gave private concerts to contest winners and played a semi-private concert for JetBlue at the John F. Kennedy International Airport in New York.

After "Mine", Swift released five more singles from Speak Now. "Back to December" and "Mean" were released to US country radio on November 15, 2010, and March 7, 2011. The two singles peaked at numbers seven and ten in Canada, and "Back to December" reached number six on the Billboard Hot 100. "The Story of Us" was released to US pop radio on April 19, 2011. "Sparks Fly" and "Ours" were released to US country radio on July 18 and December 5, 2011. Prior to its single release, "Ours", together with the other deluxe edition tracks, was released for digital download via the iTunes Store on November 8, 2011. "Sparks Fly" and "Ours" reached the top 20 on the Billboard Hot 100 and peaked atop the Hot Country Songs chart. The RIAA certified all six of the album's singles at least platinum; "Back to December" and "Mean" sold over two million copies each, and they were certified double-platinum and triple-platinum.

On November 23, 2010, Swift announced the Speak Now World Tour, which started in Singapore on February 9, 2011. The tour visited Asia and Europe before the North American leg started in Omaha, Nebraska, on May 27, 2011. Within two days of announcement, the tour sold 625,000 tickets. By April 2011, Swift had added another 16 shows to the North American leg. After the final US concert in New York City on November 22, 2011, the Speak Now World Tour had covered 80 sold-out North American shows. On August 10, 2011, Swift released a music video for "Sparks Fly" that includes footage from the tour. She released the album Speak Now World Tour – Live on November 21, 2011. In December 2011, Swift announced an extension of the tour to Australia and New Zealand starting in March 2012. Concluding on March 18, 2012, the Speak Now World Tour had covered 110 shows, visited 18 countries, (Note: United States, Canada, Australia, New Zealand, Singapore, Japan, Philippines, Hong Kong, Belgium, Norway, Germany, Netherlands, Italy, France, Spain, Ireland, Northern Ireland, and England.) and grossed $123.7 million.

== Commercial performance ==
Before Speak Now's release, Big Machine shipped two million copies of the album to stores in the United States. In the week ending November 13, 2010, the album debuted at number one on the Billboard 200 chart, with first-week sales of 1,047,000 copies. It marked the highest single-week tally for a female country artist and became the first album since Lil Wayne's Tha Carter III (2008) to sell over one million copies in its first week of release. Media publications including Billboard, MTV, and The New York Times published articles highlighting Speak Now's strong sales in the context of declining record sales brought about by the emergence of music download platforms. According to The New York Times, although the music industry in 2010 saw album sales "[plunging] by more than 50 percent in the last decade", the album proved Swift "has transcended the limitations of genre and become a pop megastar". The Guinness World Records in 2010 recognized Speak Now as the fastest-selling album in the United States by a female country artist.

In Speak Now's first charting week, 11 of the standard edition's 14 tracks charted on the Billboard Hot 100, making Swift the first female artist to have 11 songs on the Hot 100 at the same time. After the digital release of the deluxe edition tracks in November 2011, "If This Was a Movie" charted at number 10 on the Hot 100, making Swift the first artist to have eight songs debut in the top 10. (Note: The other seven songs that debuted in the top 10 of the Billboard Hot 100 are "Change" (2008), "Fearless" (2008), "Jump Then Fall" (2009), "Today Was a Fairytale" (2010), "Mine" (2010), "Speak Now" (2010), and "Back To December" (2010).) With this achievement, Speak Now had four songs peaking in the top 10 of the Billboard Hot 100—"Mine", "Back to December", "Speak Now", and "If This Was a Movie". The album spent six non-consecutive weeks atop the Billboard 200. Speak Now was the third-best-selling album of 2010 in the United States with sales of 2.96 million copies. By January 2024, it had sold 4.817 million copies in the United States. The RIAA certified the album six-times platinum, which denotes six million album-equivalent units based on sales, song downloads, and streaming.

Speak Now was a chart success in the wider English-speaking world: it peaked atop the albums charts of Australia, Canada, and New Zealand, and peaked at number six in Ireland and the United Kingdom. The album was certified triple-platinum in Australia, Canada, and New Zealand. Upon conclusion of the Asian leg of the Speak Now World Tour by February 2011, the album sold 400,000 copies in the region and received platinum sales certifications in Taiwan, South Korea, Indonesia, and the Philippines. In Europe, it charted at number four in Norway and number ten in Spain. After Swift embarked on the Eras Tour (2023–2024), Speak Now resurged in popularity in the United Kingdom: it re-entered the top 40 (at number 23) on the albums chart for the week ending May 18, 2023, which was its first top-40 appearance since November 2010.

== Critical reception ==
Contemporaneous professional ratings
Aggregate scores
Source	Rating
AnyDecentMusic?	6.9/10
Metacritic	77/100
Review scores
Source	Rating
AllMusic	4/5 stars
The A.V. Club	B−
Entertainment Weekly	B+
The Guardian	4/5 stars
Los Angeles Times	3/4 stars
MSN Music (Expert Witness)	A−
Paste	7.1/10
Rolling Stone	4/5 stars
Slant Magazine	3/5 stars
Spin	7/10

Initial reviews of Speak Now were generally positive. On the review aggregator site Metacritic, which assigns a normalized rating out of 100 to reviews from mainstream publications, the album has an average score of 77 that was based on 20 reviews. AnyDecentMusic? compiled 10 reviews and gave it an average score of 6.9 out of 10.

Most reviews praised Swift's songwriting for showcasing a mature perspective on love and relationships. Reviews from AllMusic, Entertainment Weekly, The Guardian, the Los Angeles Times, and Rolling Stone complimented the songs for portraying emotions with engaging narratives and vivid details. In AllMusic's review, Stephen Thomas Erlewine wrote: "[Swift] writes from the perspective of the moment yet has the skill of a songwriter beyond her years." American Songwriter approved of Swift's self-penned material and artistic control. In his consumer guide, Robert Christgau commented that although the album was too long and the romantic themes did not interest him, the songs were fascinating because of an "effort that bears a remarkable resemblance to care—that is, to caring in the best, broadest, and most emotional sense".

The album's dramatic themes of heartbreak and vengeance received mixed reviews. Now said although it included some memorable tracks, Speak Now was blemished by celebrity, rage, and grievances. Slant Magazine lauded Swift's melodic songwriting for offering radio-friendly pop hooks but criticized the lyrics of "Dear John", "Mean", "Innocent", and "Better than Revenge" as shallow and shortsighted. Meanwhile, Spin opined that the "bubblier" tracks like "Sparks Fly" and "Long Live" were forgettable, while the songs about vengeance like "Mean" and "Better than Revenge" were memorable because they explored "something nervy and intense when she goes nasty". In congruence, Steven Hyden from The A.V. Club wrote of those tracks: "Swift's niftiest trick is being at her most likeable when she's indulging in such overt nastiness." Entertainment Weekly agreed, deeming those tracks inevitable for Swift's artistic evolution. The Village Voice said Swift's songwriting was "not confessional, but dramatic" and found it more nuanced and mature compared to that of Fearless.

Other reviews focused on Speak Now's production. Reviews published in Paste and Slant Magazine called it a catchy album with radio-friendly pop tunes; the former was impressed by the crossover appeal but deemed the overall production dull. The Village Voice took issue with Swift's vocals as weak and strained. BBC Music found the album's track list too long but called it overall a "sparky and affecting record". Now approved of Swift's experimentation with styles other than country but considered it "too safe" and said the album was tarnished by "slickly produced power pop and a sugary sameness [that is] indiscernible from any number of today's radio-oriented artists". Ann Powers appreciated Speak Now's soft, introspective tracks for personalizing pop music. Jon Caramanica of The New York Times lauded the experimentation with genres such as blues and pop punk, and he called Speak Now a bold step for Swift.

== Accolades ==
On year-end lists of the best albums of 2010, Speak Now was ranked 12th by American Songwriter and 13th by Rolling Stone. The New York Times' Jon Caramanica ranked the album number two (behind Rick Ross's Teflon Don) in his 2010 year-end list. The album appeared on lists of the best country albums of 2010; PopMatters ranked it fifth and The Boot ranked it second. In 2012, Speak Now appeared at number 45 on Rolling Stone's list of "The 50 Greatest Female Albums of All Time"; Rob Sheffield commented: "She might get played on the country station, but she's one of the few genuine rock stars we've got these days, with a flawless ear for what makes a song click."

In 2019, Billboard listed Speak Now in 51st place on its list of the best albums of the 2010s and second on its list of best country albums of the same decade. The album also ranked 37th on Spin's 2010s decade-end list and 71st on that of Cleveland.com; and Taste of Country named it the fourth-best country album of the 2010s. Rolling Stone placed it at number 196 on their 2025 list of "The 250 Greatest Albums of the 21st Century So Far", deeming it the "peak of her Nashville era".

Speak Now received industry awards and nominations. In the United States, it was nominated for Album of the Year at the Academy of Country Music Awards, the American Country Awards, and in 2011 the Country Music Association Awards. At the 2011 Billboard Music Awards, Speak Now was nominated for Top Billboard 200 Album and won Top Country Album. It won Favorite Album (Country) at the 2011 American Music Awards and Top Selling Album of 2011 by the Canadian Country Music Association; and was nominated for International Album of the Year at the 2011 Juno Awards and for International Album of the Year at the 2012 Canadian Independent Music Awards. At the 54th Annual Grammy Awards in 2012, Speak Now was nominated for Best Country Album, and its single "Mean" won Best Country Solo Performance and Best Country Song.

== Impact ==
Swift has said that she wrote Speak Now by herself as a reaction to critics' doubts about her songwriting ability. While reviews had emphasized the importance of co-writers on her past albums, Speak Now granted Swift the definite credentials to assert authorship over her music and career. Some academics have upheld how the album solidified her artistry with its nuanced observations, confessional and confrontational songs about grappling with young adulthood and fame; many retrospective reviews have considered it a groundwork to her consistent songcraft of later albums. (Note: Attributed to retrospective rankings of Swift's albums by GQ's Lucy Ford, Entertainment Weekly's Allaire Nuss, and the Alternative Press's Kelsey Barnes) Its commercial success contributed to her fame as a pop star transcending her self-identity as a country-music artist. Pitchfork's Sam Sodomsky, reviewing the album in 2019, contended that her country-music identity served as an indicator of her autobiographical songwriting rather than musical style.

Several critics reflected on Speak Now in the context of Swift's celebrity. Many of its songs were inspired by experiences that were routinely documented in the press, such as short-lived romantic relationships and the 2009 MTV Awards incident. This set a precedent to not only the confessional songwriting on Swift's later albums, but also the media speculation on the subjects behind her lyrics. (Note: Attributed to retrospective reviews by Billboard, Vulture's Maura Johnston, Spin's Al Shipley, and Consequence's Mary Siroky) Maura Johnston opined that these songs laid the groundwork to her 2017 album Reputation, which focused on her image and confrontation against critics. According to the gender studies professor Adriane Brown, the songs about idealized romance and her innocent, "good-girl" image made her stand out in a contemporary pool of sexualized female pop artists. Brown commented that Swift's unwillingness to openly discuss sex and tendency to criticize females who "whore themselves out", as in the lyrics of "Better than Revenge", was problematic.

In November 2020, after a dispute over the ownership of the masters to her back catalog, Swift began re-recording her first six studio albums. On May 5, 2023, at the first Eras Tour show in Nashville, Swift announced the re-recorded version of Speak Now—Speak Now (Taylor's Version), and its release date on July 7. Speak Now (Taylor's Version) consists of re-recordings of all fourteen songs from the standard edition, the deluxe tracks "Ours" and "Superman", (Note: The re-recorded version of "If This Was a Movie" was released independently.) and six previously unreleased "From the Vault" songs. After Speak Now (Taylor's Version) was released, the original album reached new peaks in Switzerland (number one), Austria (number one), Germany (number two), and it was certified gold in the latter two countries. The ownership of the original album's master recording, alongside her other five albums released under Big Machine, was acquired by Swift on May 30, 2025.

== Track listing ==
All tracks are written by Taylor Swift, except the deluxe edition track "If This Was a Movie", which is written by Swift and Martin Johnson.

Standard edition
No.	Title	Length
1.	"Mine"	3:50
2.	"Sparks Fly"	4:20
3.	"Back to December"	4:53
4.	"Speak Now"	4:00
5.	"Dear John"	6:43
6.	"Mean"	3:57
7.	"The Story of Us"	4:25
8.	"Never Grow Up"	4:50
9.	"Enchanted"	5:52
10.	"Better than Revenge"	3:37
11.	"Innocent"	5:02
12.	"Haunted"	4:02
13.	"Last Kiss"	6:07
14.	"Long Live"	5:17
Total length:		66:55

Deluxe edition
No.	Title	Length
15.	"Ours"	3:58
16.	"If This Was a Movie"	3:54
17.	"Superman"	4:36
18.	"Back to December" (acoustic)	4:52
19.	"Haunted" (acoustic)	3:37
20.	"Mine" (pop mix)	3:50
21.	"On the Set: Behind the Scenes "Mine" Music Video" (video)	30:21
22.	"Mine" (music video)	3:55

=== Notes ===
- International editions feature the pop mix of "Mine", and different mixes for "Back to December" and "The Story of Us", in lieu of the original versions on track listings.
- The international iTunes Store standard edition adds the original version of "Mine" as the final track.
- The international deluxe edition includes the original versions of "Mine", "Back to December" and "The Story of Us" as the final tracks, all labeled as "US versions".
- The Japanese edition adds the original versions of "Back to December" and "The Story of Us" as the final tracks; the Japanese deluxe edition retains these track positions, with all forthcoming inclusions appearing afterwards.

== Personnel ==
Credits were adapted from the liner notes.

Musicians

- Taylor Swift – vocals, acoustic guitar, handclapping, vocal harmony, banjo
- Nathan Chapman – banjo, bass guitar, Fender Rhodes, electric twelve-string guitar, electric guitar, acoustic guitar, handclapping, mandolin, organ, piano, synthesizer, vocal harmony
- Tom Bukovac – electric guitar
- Nick Buda – drums
- Chris Carmichael – strings
- Smith Curry – lap steel guitar
- Eric Darken – percussion
- Caitlin Evanson – vocal harmony
- Shannon Forrest – drums
- John Gardner – drums
- Rob Hajacos – fiddle
- Amos Heller – bass guitar
- Liz Huett – vocal harmony
- Tim Lauer – Hammond B3, piano
- Tim Marks – bass guitar
- Mike Meadows – electric guitar, handclapping
- Grant Mickelson – electric guitar
- Michael Rhodes – bass guitar
- Paul Sidoti – electric guitar
- Tommy Sims – bass guitar
- Bryan Sutton – acoustic guitar, twelve-string guitar, ukulele
- Al Wilson – handclapping, percussion

Production

- Taylor Swift – background vocals direction, liner notes, songwriter, producer
- Nathan Chapman – engineer, producer, programming
- Chuck Ainlay – engineer
- Joseph Anthony Baker – photography
- Steve Blackmon – assistant
- Drew Bollman – assistant, assistant engineer, engineer
- Tristan Brock-Jones – assistant engineer
- David Bryant – assistant engineer
- Paul Buckmaster – conductor, orchestral arrangements
- Jason Campbell – production coordination
- Chad Carlson – engineer
- Chris Carmichael – composer, string arrangements
- Joseph Cassell – stylist
- Steve Churchyard – engineer
- Mark Crew – mixing engineer
- Dean Gillard – production, mixing, additional instrumentation
- Jed Hackett – engineer
- Jeremy Hunter – engineer
- Aubrey Hyde – wardrobe
- Suzie Katayama – orchestra contractor
- Steve Marcantonio – engineer
- Seth Morton – assistant engineer
- Emily Mueller – production assistant
- Jemma Muradian – hair stylist
- John Netti – assistant engineer
- Bethany Newman – design, illustrations
- Josh Newman – design, illustrations
- Justin Niebank – engineer, mixing
- Mark Petaccia – assistant engineer
- Joel Quillen – engineer
- Matt Rausch – assistant
- Lowell Reynolds – engineer
- Mike Rooney – assistant engineer
- Austin Swift – photography
- Todd Tidwell – assistant engineer, engineer
- Lorrie Turk – make-up
- Matt Ward – production, mixing, additional instrumentation
- Hank Williams – mastering
- Brian David Willis – engineer
- Nathan Yarborough – assistant mixing engineer

== Charts ==
=== Weekly charts ===
2010–2011 weekly charts
Chart (2010–2011)	Peak position
Australian Albums (ARIA)	1
Australian Country Albums (ARIA)	1
Austrian Albums (Ö3 Austria)	16
Belgian Albums (Ultratop Flanders)	18
Belgian Albums (Ultratop Wallonia)	45
Canadian Albums (Billboard)	1
Danish Albums (Hitlisten)	26
Dutch Albums (Album Top 100)	17
European Top 100 Albums (Billboard)	9
French Albums (SNEP)	39
German Albums (Offizielle Top 100)	15
Greek Albums (IFPI)	17
Hong Kong Albums (IFPI)	1
Irish Albums (IRMA)	6
Italian Albums (FIMI)	18
Japanese Albums (Billboard Japan)	6
Japanese Albums (Oricon)	6
Mexican Albums (AMPROFON)	8
New Zealand Albums (RMNZ)	1
Norwegian Albums (VG-lista)	4
Scottish Albums (Official Charts)	5
South Korean Albums (Circle)	28
Singaporean Albums (IFPI)	1
Spanish Albums (Promusicae)	10
Swedish Albums (Sverigetopplistan)	18
Swiss Albums (Schweizer Hitparade)	17
UK Albums (Official Charts)	6
US Billboard 200	1
US Top Country Albums (Billboard)	1

2019–2023 weekly charts
Chart (2019–2023) (Note: The chart positions listed below coincided with the release of the 2023 re-recording Speak Now (Taylor's Version). In Austria, Germany, Greece, Portugal and Switzerland, the chart performance of the original Speak Now was combined with that of Speak Now (Taylor's Version).)	Peak position
Argentine Albums (CAPIF)	3
Austrian Albums (Ö3 Austria Top 40)	1
German Albums (Offizielle Top 100)	2
Greek Albums (IFPI)	1
Portuguese Albums (AFP)	1
Swiss Albums (Schweizer Hitparade)	1
UK Albums (Official Charts)	23
US Independent Albums (Billboard)	4

=== Year-end charts ===
2010 year-end charts
Chart (2010)	Position
Australian Albums (ARIA)	15
Canadian Albums (Billboard)	15
New Zealand Albums (RMNZ)	15
UK Albums (OCC)	163
US Billboard 200	9
US Top Country Albums (Billboard)	3

2011 year-end charts
Chart (2011)	Position
Australian Albums (ARIA)	51
Canadian Albums (Billboard)	9
Japanese Albums (Billboard Japan)	85
New Zealand Albums (RMNZ)	34
US Billboard 200	2
US Top Country Albums (Billboard)	1

2012 year-end charts
Chart (2012)	Position
US Billboard 200	45
US Top Country Albums (Billboard)	18

2017 year-end chart
Chart (2017)	Position
US Top Country Albums (Billboard)	73

2018 year-end chart
Chart (2018)	Position
US Top Country Albums (Billboard)	77

2021 year-end charts
Chart (2021)	Position
US Top Country Albums (Billboard)	34
US Independent Albums (Billboard)	50

2022 year-end charts
Chart (2022)	Position
US Independent Albums (Billboard)	19
US Top Country Albums (Billboard)	15

2023 year-end charts
Chart (2023)	Position
Austrian Albums (Ö3 Austria)	42
German Albums (Offizielle Top 100)	32
Swiss Albums (Schweizer Hitparade)	63
US Billboard 200	115
US Independent Albums (Billboard)	14
US Top Country Albums (Billboard)	18

=== Decade-end charts ===
2010s decade-end charts
Chart (2010–2019)	Position
Australian Albums (ARIA)	39
US Billboard 200	50
US Top Country Albums (Billboard)	17

=== All-time charts ===
All-time charts
Chart	Position
US Billboard 200 (Women) (Note: Compiled by Billboard for albums 1963–2017)	66
US Top Country Albums (Billboard) (Note: Compiled by Billboard for albums 1963–2016)	73

== Certifications and sales ==
Certifications with pure sales where available
Region	Certification	Certified units/sales
Australia (ARIA)	3× Platinum	210,000^{‡}
Austria (IFPI Austria)	Gold	10,000^{*}
Brazil (Pro-Música Brasil)	Gold	20,000^{*}
Canada (Music Canada)	3× Platinum	240,000^{^}
Germany (BVMI)	Gold	100,000^{‡}
Hong Kong	Gold	
Indonesia	Platinum	
Ireland (IRMA)	Gold	7,500^{^}
Japan (RIAJ)	Gold	100,000^{^}
New Zealand (RMNZ)	3× Platinum	45,000^{‡}
Norway (IFPI Norway)	Gold	15,000^{*}
Philippines (PARI)	Platinum	15,000 (Note: Philippine sales as of February 2011)
Singapore (RIAS)	Platinum	10,000^{*}
Switzerland (IFPI Switzerland)	Gold	15,000^{‡}
Taiwan	Platinum	
United Kingdom (BPI)	Platinum	300,000^{‡}
United States (RIAA)	6× Platinum	4,817,000 (Note: US sales as of January 2024)
^{*} Sales figures based on certification alone.^{^} Shipments figures based on certification alone.^{‡} Sales+streaming figures based on certification alone.

== See also ==
- List of Billboard 200 number-one albums of 2010
- List of Billboard 200 number-one albums of 2011
- List of Top Country Albums number ones of 2010
- List of Top Country Albums number ones of 2011
- List of number-one albums of 2010 (Canada)
- List of number-one albums from the 2010s (New Zealand)
- List of number-one albums of 2010 (Australia)
