= List of Top Country Albums number ones of 2010 =

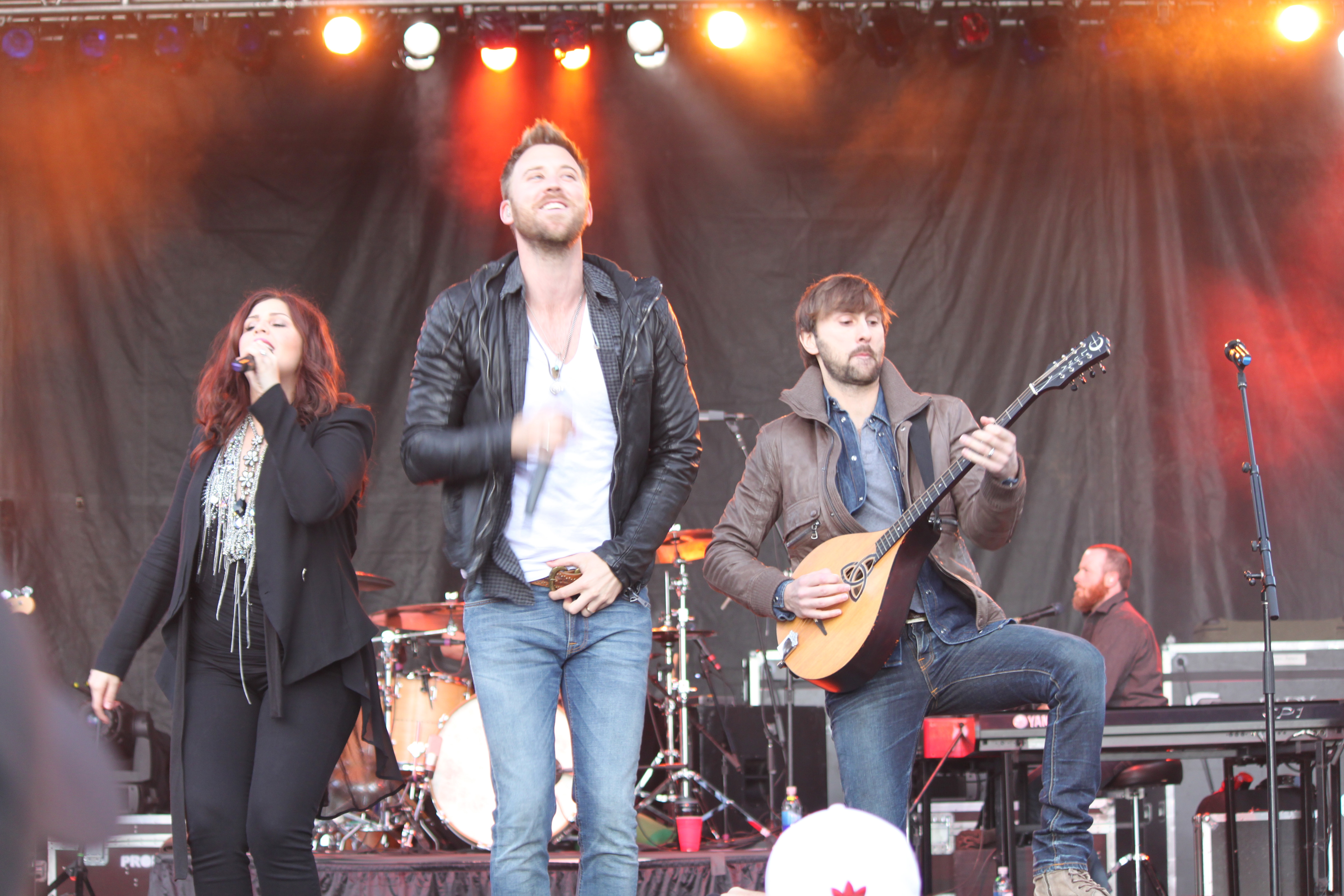
Lady Antebellum spent 24 consecutive weeks at number one with Need You Now.

Top Country Albums is a chart that ranks the top-performing country music albums in the United States, published by Billboard. In 2010, 14 different albums topped the chart; placings were based on electronic point of sale data from retail outlets.

The year both began and ended with albums by Taylor Swift at number one. In the issue of Billboard dated January 2, her album Fearless held the top spot, its thirtieth week atop the chart. It remained at number one for a further five weeks for a final total of 35 weeks in the peak position, the highest figure for an album since the soundtrack album of the film O Brother, Where Art Thou? spent the same length of time at number one in 2001 and 2002. Fearless was displaced from the top spot in the issue dated February 13 by Need You Now by the group Lady Antebellum, which spent 24 consecutive weeks at number one, lasting through the issue dated July 24. Swift returned to number one in November with Speak Now, which spent six of the final seven weeks of 2010, meaning that Swift was the only act with more than one number one during the year. Need You Now and Speak Now were among a number of country albums to also top the all-genre Billboard 200 chart in 2010.

Five acts reached number one in 2010 for the first time. In July, Jerrod Niemann gained his first chart-topper with Judge Jerrod & the Hung Jury, interrupting Lady Antebellum's time at number one for a single week. In August, Blake Shelton reached number one for the first time in his career with the six-track EP All About Tonight. Shelton had first entered both the country singles and albums charts in 2001 and had achieved a number of chart-topping singles, but had never managed to reach the top of the albums listing until 2010. The band Little Big Town also reached the top spot on the country albums chart for the first time in 2010 after a lengthy wait; The Reason Why topped the chart in September more than eight years after the group first entered the chart. The following month Jamey Johnson and the Zac Brown Band made their first appearances at number one in consecutive weeks with The Guitar Song and You Get What You Give respectively. The latter album began an unbroken run of chart-toppers for the group; as of the end of the decade the band had reached number one with five consecutive albums.

== Chart history ==
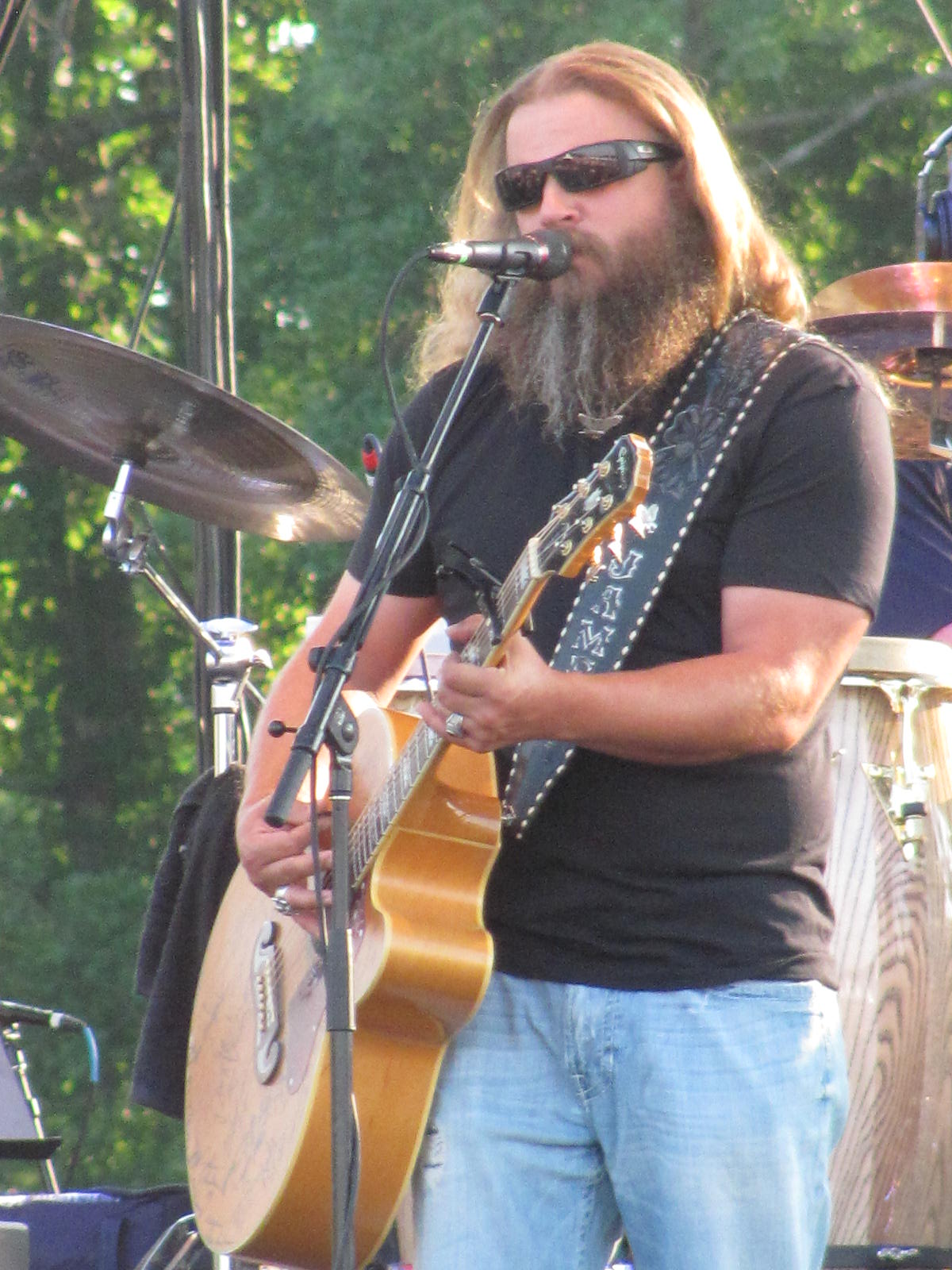
Jamey Johnson reached number one for the first time with The Guitar Song.

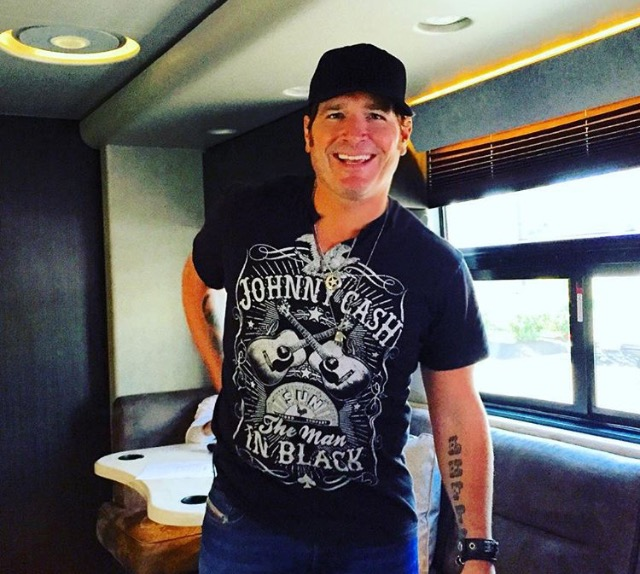
Judge Jerrod & the Hung Jury was the first chart-topper for Jerrod Niemann.

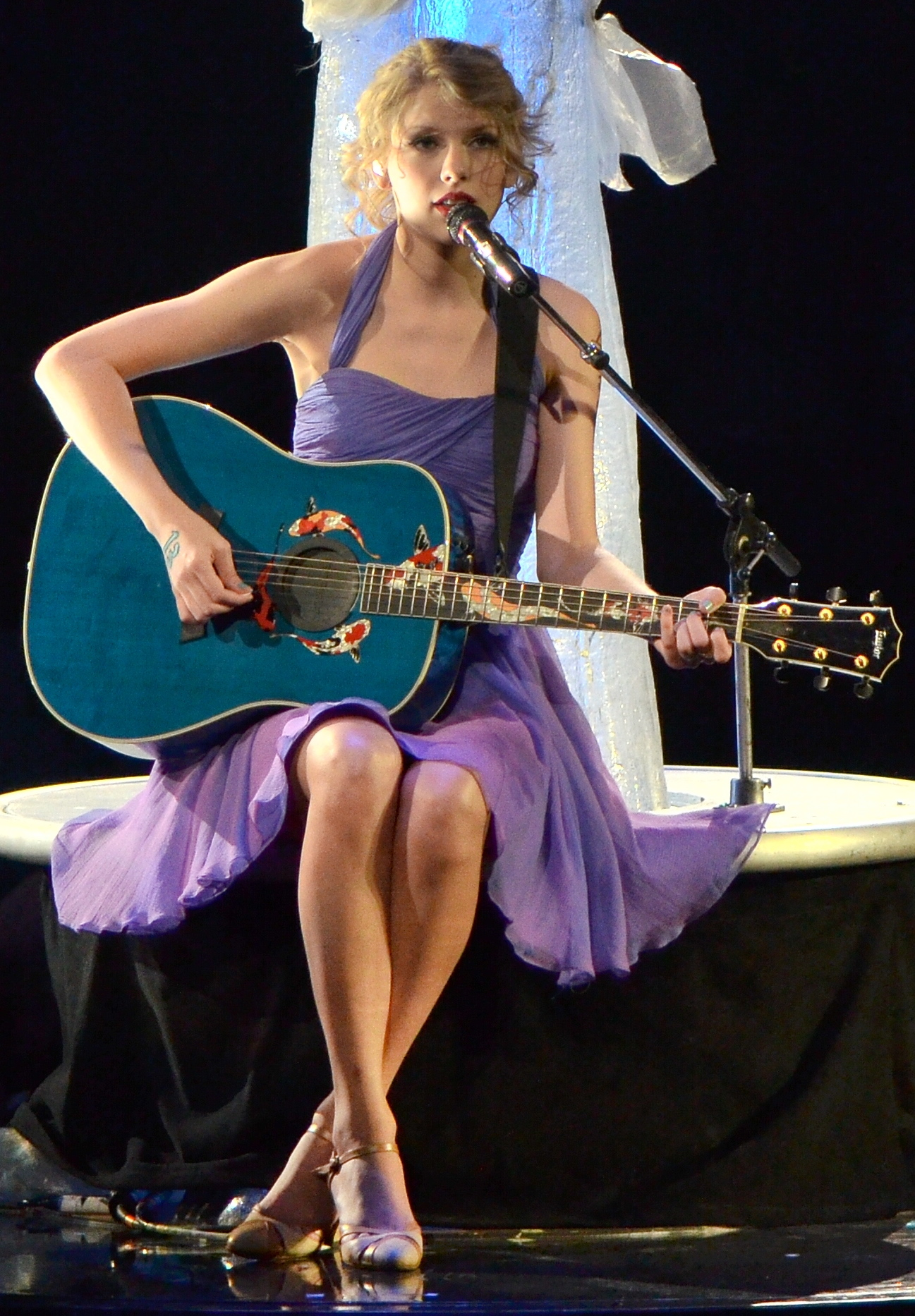
Taylor Swift both began and ended the year at number one.

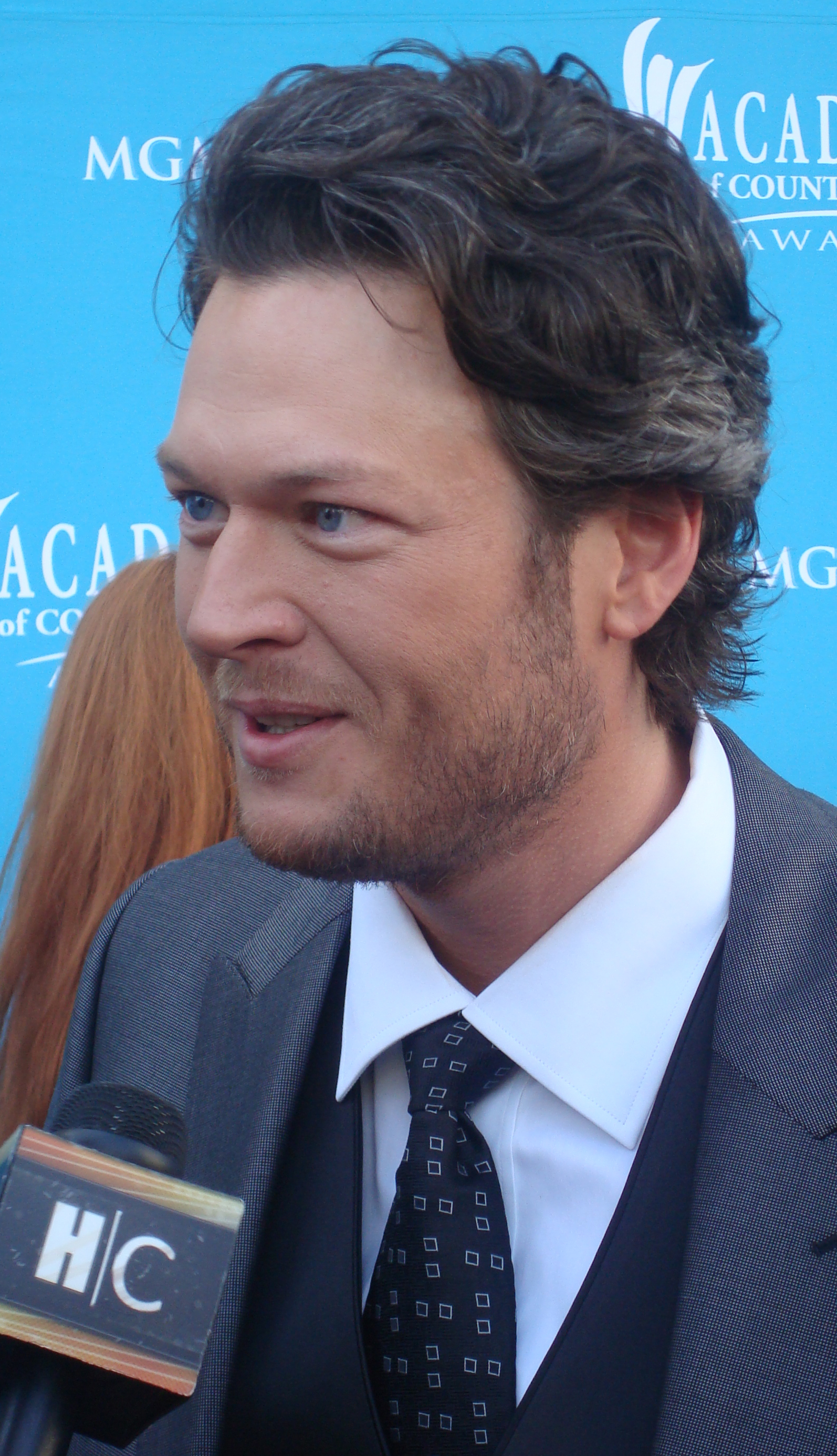
Blake Shelton topped the chart with the six-song EP All About Tonight.

Issue date	Title	Artist(s)	Ref.
January 2	Fearless	Taylor Swift	
January 9	Fearless	Taylor Swift	
January 16	Fearless	Taylor Swift	
January 23	Fearless	Taylor Swift	
January 30	Fearless	Taylor Swift	
February 6	Fearless	Taylor Swift	
February 13	Need You Now	Lady Antebellum	
February 20	Need You Now	Lady Antebellum	
February 27	Need You Now	Lady Antebellum	
March 6	Need You Now	Lady Antebellum	
March 13	Need You Now	Lady Antebellum	
March 20	Need You Now	Lady Antebellum	
March 27	Need You Now	Lady Antebellum	
April 3	Need You Now	Lady Antebellum	
April 10	Need You Now	Lady Antebellum	
April 17	Need You Now	Lady Antebellum	
April 24	Need You Now	Lady Antebellum	
May 1	Need You Now	Lady Antebellum	
May 8	Need You Now	Lady Antebellum	
May 15	Need You Now	Lady Antebellum	
May 22	Need You Now	Lady Antebellum	
May 29	Need You Now	Lady Antebellum	
June 5	Need You Now	Lady Antebellum	
June 12	Need You Now	Lady Antebellum	
June 19	Need You Now	Lady Antebellum	
June 26	Need You Now	Lady Antebellum	
July 3	Need You Now	Lady Antebellum	
July 10	Need You Now	Lady Antebellum	
July 17	Need You Now	Lady Antebellum	
July 24	Need You Now	Lady Antebellum	
July 31	Judge Jerrod & the Hung Jury	Jerrod Niemann	
August 7	Need You Now	Lady Antebellum	
August 14	Need You Now	Lady Antebellum	
August 21	Need You Now	Lady Antebellum	
August 28	All About Tonight	Blake Shelton	
September 4	Cowboy's Back in Town	Trace Adkins	
September 11	The Reason Why	Little Big Town	
September 18	Need You Now	Lady Antebellum	
September 25	Need You Now	Lady Antebellum	
October 2	The Guitar Song	Jamey Johnson	
October 9	You Get What You Give	Zac Brown Band	
October 16	Hemingway's Whiskey	Kenny Chesney	
October 23	Bullets in the Gun	Toby Keith	
October 30	Charleston, SC 1966	Darius Rucker	
November 6	The Incredible Machine	Sugarland	
November 13	Speak Now	Taylor Swift	
November 20	Speak Now	Taylor Swift	
November 27	Speak Now	Taylor Swift	
December 4	Nothing Like This	Rascal Flatts	
December 11	Speak Now	Taylor Swift	
December 18	Speak Now	Taylor Swift	
December 25	Speak Now	Taylor Swift	
