= Ours (song) =

2011 single by Taylor Swift

Single by Taylor Swift

from the album Speak Now (Deluxe Edition)
- Released: December 5, 2011
- Studio: Starstruck; Pain in the Art; Blackbird (Nashville)
- Genre: Country pop; country folk
- Length: 3:58
- Label: Big Machine
- Songwriter: Taylor Swift
- Producers: Taylor Swift; Nathan Chapman

Taylor Swift singles chronology
"Sparks Fly" (2011)	"Ours" (2011)	"Eyes Open" (2012)

Music video
- "Ours" on YouTube

"Ours" is a song written and recorded by the American singer-songwriter Taylor Swift for the deluxe edition of her third studio album, Speak Now (2010). It was released to US country radio as the album's last single on December 5, 2011, by Big Machine Records. Produced by Swift and Nathan Chapman, "Ours" is an understated country pop and country folk ballad with a folk-influenced production. The lyrics depict a young couple's resilience to protect their relationship despite others' scrutiny.

Music critics noted that "Ours" features an understated production as opposed to Swift's previous upbeat singles, and complimented the intricate lyrical details. In the United States, the song peaked at number one on the Hot Country Songs chart and at number 13 on the Billboard Hot 100, and was certified Platinum by the Recording Industry Association of America (RIAA). Internationally, the song charted on the singles charts of Australia, Canada, and the United Kingdom.

The single was supported by a music video directed by Declan Whitebloon featuring Zach Gilford. Swift performed the song live at the 2011 Country Music Association Awards and included it in the concerts of her Speak Now World Tour. A re-recorded version, titled "Ours (Taylor's Version)", was released as part of her third re-recorded album Speak Now (Taylor's Version) on July 7, 2023.

== Background and composition ==
The American singer-songwriter Taylor Swift began work on her third studio album, Speak Now (2010), two years prior to its release. "Ours" is a bonus song on the album's deluxe edition, which was available exclusively via Target in the United States. On November 8, 2011, "Ours" was released for download through the US iTunes Store by Big Machine Records. A promotional CD single was released on November 21, 2011; the CD single includes the song and a recorded live performance of "Ours". It was released to US country radio as the album's sixth and final single on December 5, 2011.

Swift wrote "Ours", which she also produced alongside Nathan Chapman. The song is a country pop and country folk ballad with a folk-influenced production instrumented by a ukulele, a Rhodes piano, and acoustic guitars. Compared to other Speak Now tracks, "Ours" features an understated production that highlights Swift's vocals. The lyrics depict a young couple's resilience to protect their relationship despite others' scrutiny. The first line that Swift wrote for the song was, "The stakes are high, the water's rough." The song's couple have experienced the hardships of life and realize, "Life makes love look hard." She tells the boyfriend that she loves him for him, " 'Cause I love the gap between your teeth/ And I love the riddles that you speak/ And any snide remarks from my father about your tattoos/ Will be ignored/ 'Cause my heart is yours," and affirms that she does not care what others think.

== Critical reception ==
Music critics gave "Ours" generally positive reviews. Billy Dukes of Taste of Country gave the song a four-and-a-half out of five rating and praised the understated production compared to the "shine and polish" of Swift's past singles. Karen Goodner of All Access similarly complimented the folksy and midtempo production. Allen Jacobs of Roughstock claimed "Ours" as Swift's "best single" since "White Horse" (2008). The Arizona Republic's Ed Masley complimented the "bittersweet ache" in Swift's vocals and said that the track sounds like what Fleetwood Mac would release. In Rolling Stone, Rob Sheffield favorably compared the song to the Replacements' music and said it is one of his most-repeated among Swift's discography. The lyrics "Don't you worry your pretty little mind / People throw rocks at things that shine" were highlighted by some critics as the song's most memorable.

On a less positive side, Alexis Petridis from The Guardian found the song not as groundbreaking as Swift's other singles, but said it contains "a certain low-key charm". Erin Thompson of Seattle Weekly opined that "Ours" is inferior to "If This Was a Movie", another Speak Now deluxe edition track. Thompson wrote that after a few listens, the former sounds like "a mess of mixed metaphors". Hannah Mylrea from NME dismissed the lyrics as "mawkish" and the production as "sickly sweet".

== Commercial performance ==
After its digital release in November 2011, "Ours" debuted and peaked at number 13 on the US Billboard Hot 100 and number five on the Hot Digital Songs chart, with first-week digital sales of 148,000 copies. It spent 20 weeks in total on the Hot 100. On the Hot Country Songs chart, "Ours" reached number one on the week ending March 31, 2012, becoming Swift's sixth chart topper. The single was certified Platinum by the Recording Industry Association of America (RIAA) for one million units sold in the US. As of November 2017, "Ours" has sold 1.5 million copies in the United States. Elsewhere, the song appeared at number 91 on Australia's ARIA Charts, number 68 on Canada's Canadian Hot 100, and at number 181 on the UK Singles Chart.

== Live performances and music video ==
Swift debuted the song live at the 2011 Country Music Association Awards on November 9. She sang an acoustic version and performed in a bright pink sweater on a living room sofa. "Ours" was added to the set lists of some U.S. shows in late 2011, and the Australian shows in 2012, as part of the Speak Now World Tour. In 2012, Swift sang the song as part of a VH1 Storytellers episode taped at Harvey Mudd College in California. Swift performed the song on select dates of later tours, including the Red Tour (Los Angeles, August 2013), the Reputation Stadium Tour (Foxborough, Massachusetts, July 2018), and the Eras Tour (Arlington, Texas, March 2023). On the June 29, 2024, show of the Eras Tour in Dublin, she sang the track in a mashup with her song "This Love" (2014).

The music video for "Ours" premiered on E! on December 2, 2011. The video was directed by Declan Whitebloom, who had directed the video for Speak Now's single "Mean". Swift conceptualized the video's narrative herself. In the video, Swift plays an office worker, donning tennis shoes and messy hair. She engages in mundane daily corporate experience such as riding the bus to work, waiting to drink at the water cooler, and enduring annoying co-workers. As the video approaches the end, Swift's character is excited to leave work and meet her boyfriend (portrayed by Zach Gilford). They meet at the airport; the boyfriend appears in military attire.

Much of the video is monotonous until the moment the couple meet; in the Nanaimo Daily News, Leah Collins noted that the part where Swift meets her boyfriend is the video's only "warm and fuzzy thing". Entertainment Weekly's Erin Strecker considered the video more adult and realistic than Swift's previous romantic videos, but praised it because it "still captures that butterflies-in-your-stomach, crazy-in-love tone that she is so famous for". The video spent seven weeks at number one on CMT; it also reached number one on Great American Country and Australia's Country Music Channel.

== Accolades ==
Accolades
Year	Organization	Award/work	Result	Ref.
2012	American Country Awards	Female Single of the Year	Nominated	
2012	American Country Awards	Female Video of the Year	Nominated	
2012	CMT Music Awards	Female Video of the Year	Nominated	
2013	BMI Awards	Country Awards Top 50 Songs	Won	

== Credits and personnel ==
Credits are adapted from the liner notes of the CD single.

- Taylor Swift – lead vocals, songwriter, producer
- Brian David Willis – additional engineering
- Bryan Sutton – 12-string guitar, ukulele
- Chad Carlson – recording
- Drew Bollman – assistant mixing
- Emily Mueller – production assistant
- Hank Williams – mastering
- Jason Campbell – production coordinator
- Justin Niebank – mixing
- Matt Rausch – assistant mixing
- Nathan Chapman – producer, recording, acoustic guitar, audio programming, Rhodes piano, harmony vocals, additional engineering
- Steve Blackmon – assistant mixing
- Matt Rausch – background vocals
- Tristan Brock-Jones – assistant engineer
- Todd Tidwell – assistant engineer
- Whitney Sutton – copy coordinator

== Charts ==
=== Weekly charts ===
Weekly chart performance
Chart (2011–2012)	Peak position
Australia (ARIA)	91
Canada Hot 100 (Billboard)	68
Canada Country (Billboard)	1
UK Singles (OCC)	181
US Billboard Hot 100	13
US Hot Country Songs (Billboard)	1

=== Year-end charts ===
Year-end chart performance
Chart (2012)	Position
US Hot Country Songs (Billboard)	37

== Certifications ==
Certifications
Region	Certification	Certified units/sales
Australia (ARIA)	Gold	35,000^{‡}
United States (RIAA)	Platinum	1,500,000
^{‡} Sales+streaming figures based on certification alone.

== Release history ==
Release dates and formats
Region	Date	Format	Label	Ref.
United States	November 8, 2011	Digital download	Big Machine	
United States	November 21, 2011	CD single	Big Machine	
United States	December 5, 2011	Country radio	Big Machine	

== "Ours (Taylor's Version)" ==
"Ours (Taylor's Version)"

Song by Taylor Swift

from the album Speak Now (Taylor's Version)
- Released: July 7, 2023
- Studio: Blackbird Studio (Nashville, TN); Kitty Committee Studio (London, England); Prime Recording (Nashville, TN)
- Length: 3:55
- Label: Republic
- Songwriter: Taylor Swift
- Producers: Taylor Swift; Christopher Rowe

Lyric video
- "Ours (Taylor's Version)" on YouTube

After signing a new contract with Republic Records, Swift began re-recording her first six studio albums in November 2020. The decision came after the public 2019 dispute between Swift and the talent manager Scooter Braun, who acquired Big Machine Records, including the masters of Swift's albums the label had released. By re-recording her catalog, Swift had full ownership of the new masters, including the copyright licensing of her songs, devaluing the Big Machine-owned masters.

A re-recorded version of "Ours", titled "Ours (Taylor's Version)", was released on July 7, 2023, via Republic Records as part of Speak Now (Taylor's Version), Swift's third re-recorded album.

=== Personnel ===
Adapted from Speak Now (Taylor's Version) digital album inline notes

- Taylor Swift – vocals, background vocals, songwriter, producer
- Christopher Rowe – producer, vocal engineer
- David Payne – recording engineer
- Lowell Reynolds – assistant recording engineer, editor
- Derek Garten – engineer, editor, programming
- Dan Burns – additional engineer, synthesizer programming
- Serban Ghenea – mixing
- Bryce Bordone – mix engineer
- Randy Merrill – mastering
- Matt Billingslea – drums
- Amos Heller – bass guitar
- Paul Sidoti – ukulele
- Mike Meadows – acoustic guitar, background vocals
- Max Bernstein – keyboards

=== Charts ===
Chart performance for Taylor's version
Chart (2023)	Peak position
Australia (ARIA)	85
Canada Hot 100 (Billboard)	65
Global 200 (Billboard)	91
Philippines (Billboard)	20
US Billboard Hot 100	68
US Hot Country Songs (Billboard)	29
