= Sparks Fly (song) =

2011 single by Taylor Swift

Single by Taylor Swift

from the album Speak Now
- Written: 2006
- Released: July 18, 2011
- Genre: Pop rock; country pop; power pop
- Length: 4:22
- Label: Big Machine
- Songwriter: Taylor Swift
- Producers: Taylor Swift; Nathan Chapman

Taylor Swift singles chronology
"The Story of Us" (2011)	"Sparks Fly" (2011)	"Ours" (2011)

Music video
- "Sparks Fly" on YouTube

"Sparks Fly" is a song by the American singer-songwriter Taylor Swift from her third studio album, Speak Now (2010). Swift had written the track in 2006 and occasionally performed it live, and she produced it with Nathan Chapman for Speak Now after receiving fan requests. "Sparks Fly" is a pop rock, country pop, and power pop song with influences of country music and arena rock; its production incorporates dynamic electric guitars and subtle fiddles. The lyrics are about temptations and reluctance caused by a dangerous love affair.

Big Machine Records released "Sparks Fly" to country radio in the United States on July 18, 2011, as the fifth single from Speak Now. The accompanying music video was released on August 10, 2011, and it features footage from the Speak Now World Tour. While some critics praised the production and lyrics that demonstrated personal emotions with specificity, others deemed the lyrical imagery somewhat unoriginal. "Sparks Fly" won a Teen Choice Award for Choice Music – Country Song.

In the United States, the single peaked at number 17 on the Billboard Hot 100 and at number one on Hot Country Songs, and it was certified platinum by the Recording Industry Association of America. It also charted in Australia and Canada. Swift performed "Sparks Fly" on the Speak Now World Tour (2011–2012) and the Red Tour (2013–2014), and she occasionally performed it on her later tours. Following the 2019 dispute regarding the ownership of Swift's back catalog, she re-recorded the song as "Sparks Fly (Taylor's Version)" for her re-recorded album Speak Now (Taylor's Version) (2023).

== Background and release ==
Taylor Swift wrote "Sparks Fly" when she was 16 years old, around the time she was conceiving her debut album, Taylor Swift (2006). She recalled that she performed the song occasionally for bar shows and small concerts, and in 2008, a recorded video of a performance circulated on the internet and gained traction among her fans. "Sparks Fly" became a fan favorite, and Swift decided to rework the song for her third studio album, Speak Now, after she received fan requests to release it at the 2010 CMA Music Festival backstage. This version includes some changes to the lyrics but keeps the original arrangement.

Speak Now was released on October 25, 2010. According to Swift, by the time the album was scheduled for release, she had performed "Sparks Fly" live "at maybe one or two shows". Big Machine Records released the song to country radio in the United States on July 18, 2011, as the album's fifth single. CD single variants were released as part of exclusive packages via Swift's online store; each package included Speak Now-themed merchandise. The single was also bundled with another exclusive package that included the Target-exclusive deluxe edition of Speak Now and related merchandise; this packaged included one of the three options for the CD single: "Sparks Fly", "The Story of Us", and "Mean".

== Music and lyrics ==
"Sparks Fly" (2011)
A sample of "Sparks Fly" featuring the refrain beginning with Swift's a capella "Drop everything now". The song combines country, pop rock, and arena rock with electric guitars in the production.

Swift wrote "Sparks Fly" by herself and produced it with Nathan Chapman. Set over a tempo of 115 beats per minute, it is a pop rock, country pop, and power pop song. In Taste of Country, Amanda Hensel commented that "Sparks Fly" straddles the perceived boundary between country and pop. Ed Masley of The Arizona Republic called the song "a perfect blend of '70s arena rock and country". The production is led by acoustic guitars, alternating between strumming and arpeggios, while also incorporating electric guitars and subtle fiddles. The electric guitars are layered, using techniques that include palm mute rhythms, ostinato motifs, tremolo effects, and melodic counterpoints.

According to Swift, the song is about an irresistible but dangerous love affair with strong connection and chemistry. In the lyrics, which feature fairy-tale imagery, the narrator talks about her obsession with a green-eyed boy, wanting to kiss him in the rain and waiting for him to lead her to private spaces. In the refrain, the narrator begs her love interest to "Drop everything now" and meet her in the pouring rain; Jonathan Keefe in Country Universe deemed this part the track's hook. The lyrics mentioning love under the rain recall many of Swift's previous songs from her second album Fearless (2008), including the title track, "Hey Stephen", and "Forever & Always".

The second verse of the 2010 album version replaces some lyrics in the original version such as, "Cause my heart is beating fast and you are beautiful," and includes new lyrics such as, "My mind forgets to remind me you're a bad idea." Chris Willman from Yahoo! Music commented that the new lyrics portray the narrator as more confident. Additionally, the album version leaves out the banjo on the original. According to Theon Weber of The Village Voice, the lyric, "Gimme something that'll haunt me when you're not around," is an allusion to sex.

== Critical reception ==
In a review of Speak Now for Rolling Stone, Rob Sheffield selected "Sparks Fly" as an example where Swift improved as a singer. Country Universe's Jonathan Keefe was unimpressed with Swift's vocals, which he deemed technically weak and limited, but lauded the song for its production and simplicity. Though Keefe remarked that the lyrical imagery was generic, the song "proves how evocative those turns-of-phrase can be in the right context". Keefe gave the track an A rating. Larry Rodgers of The Arizona Republic thought that the song showcased a grown-up side to Swift's songwriting, and Michael McFall of the Associated Press picked it as a highlight of Speak Now, lauding how Swift was "at her most vocally and lyrically expressive". In the Daily Breeze, Sam Gnerre described "Sparks Fly" as a "first-rate guitar-powered [rocker]". Elysa Gardner of USA Today deemed the song a "witty confession" and recommended it for download.

There were some less complimentary reviews. Bobby Peacock of Roughstock and Amanda Hensel of Taste of Country both gave "Sparks Fly" a three-and-a-half rating out of five. Peacock welcomed the lyrical revisions from the original version and said that although the refrain is catchy, the song begins to trail off by the second half. Hensel similarly commended the catchy production but felt that it lacked the originality of Speak Now's previous single "Mean". On a more negative side, Erin Thompson of Seattle Weekly commented the rain imagery on "Sparks Fly" represented Swift's lack of repertoire in her songwriting. John J. Moser from The Morning Call and Mikael Wood from Spin considered it one of the album's weakest tracks. Sean Dealy, in the St. Petersburg Times, criticized the track as one of the album's "factory-line label-pleasers" and wrote that Swift should write fewer songs in that manner.

In a retrospective review, NME's Hannah Mylrea lauded the "euphoric" production and described the song as a "toe-tapping head-banging anthem". Sheffield picked it as an example where Swift "shows off her uncanny power to make a moment sound gauchely private and messily public at the same time". In Consequence, Mary Siroky opined that "Sparks Fly", which "fervidly showcased Swift's maturing approaches to songwriting and romance", should have been Speak Now's lead single replacing the "safe and reflective" "Mine". Finley Liu, in a South China Morning Post ranking of Swift's discography, picked "Sparks Fly" as one of the album's underrated songs.

== Accolades ==
At the BMI Country Awards in 2012, "Sparks Fly" was one of the 50 award-winning songs and helped Sony Music Publishing earn the award for Publisher of the Year. It received a nomination for Favorite Song at the 2012 Nickelodeon Kids' Choice Awards and won Choice Country Song at the 2012 Teen Choice Awards. In 2019, Insider named "Sparks Fly" one of the eighteen best songs written by teenagers.

== Commercial performance ==
After Speak Now was released, "Sparks Fly" debuted at number 17 (which also became its peak) on the US Billboard Hot 100 chart dated November 4, 2010. It was one of the ten Speak Now tracks that debuted on the Hot 100 the same week, making Swift the first act to have ten new Hot 100 entries at the same time. After its single release, it re-entered the Billboard Hot 100 at number 84 on the week ending August 27, 2011. "Sparks Fly" spent a total of 20 weeks on the Hot 100.

On Billboard's Hot Country Songs chart, which monitored US country airplay, the song peaked at number one on the chart dated November 26, 2011; it spent 21 weeks in total on the chart. It was Swift's fifth Hot Country Songs number-one single and her first since "You Belong with Me" (2009). "Sparks Fly" ranked at number 37 on the 2011 Hot Country Songs year-end chart. The single was certified platinum by the Recording Industry Association of America (RIAA) for surpassing one million units and, as of November 2017, had sold 1.1 million digital copies in the United States.

In Canada, "Sparks Fly" debuted and peaked at number 28 on the Canadian Hot 100 and number three on the Canada Country chart. The single reached the lower-tier positions on charts in Australia (number 97) and Flanders (number 17 on the Ultratip chart).

== Live performances ==
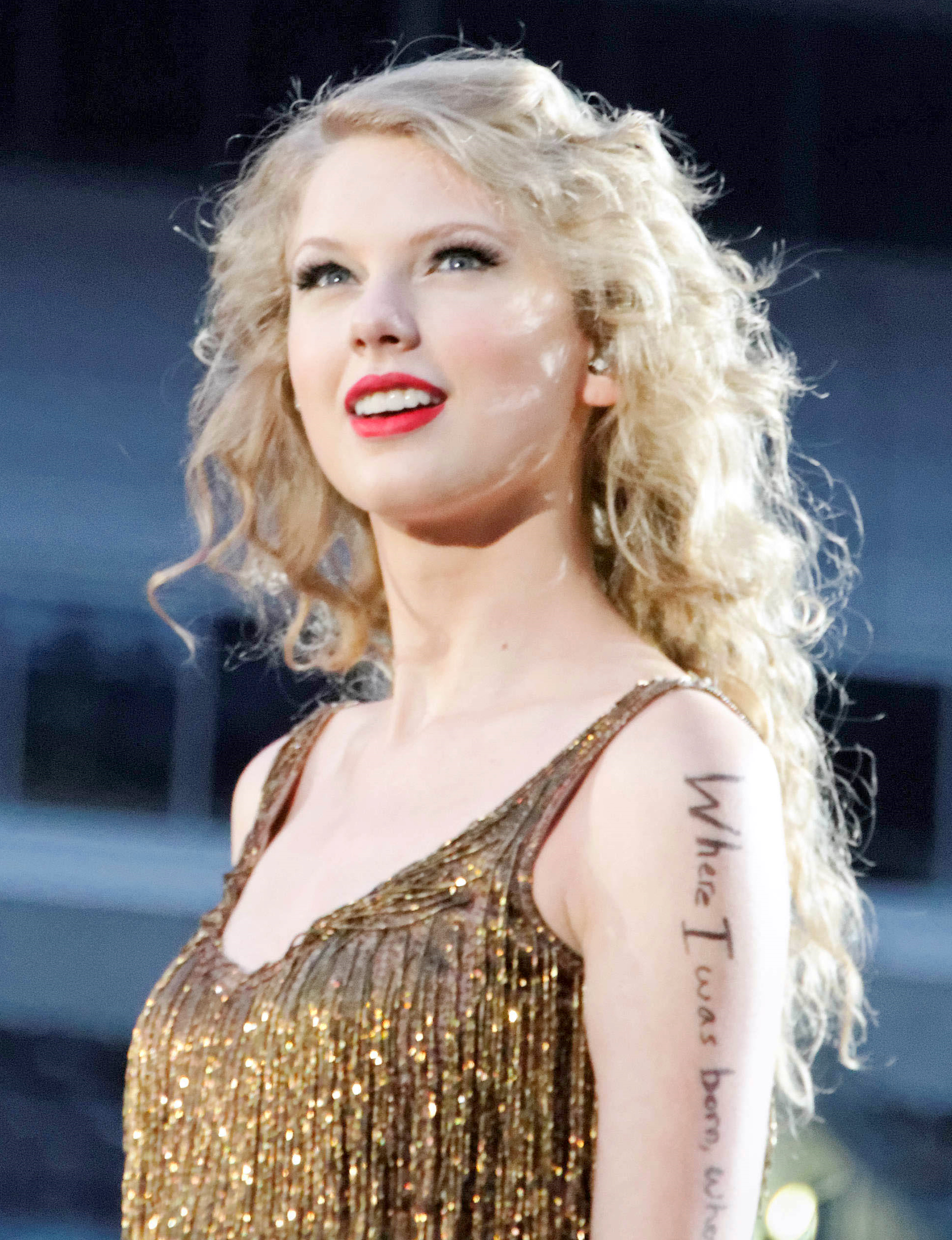
Swift during the performance of "Sparks Fly" on the Speak Now World Tour (pictured in Pittsburgh in 2011)

Swift performed "Sparks Fly" as an unreleased song during a few live shows in 2007. She performed "Sparks Fly" for an NBC Speak Now Thanksgiving Special, which broadcast on November 25, 2010. The television special showcased the making of the album along with live performances on a rooftop in New York City. On the Speak Now World Tour (2011–2012), Swift included it as the opening song to the concerts. She sang the song wearing a gold dress and tall black boots as fireworks dashed through a three-staircase stage. The performance was recorded and released on Swift's live album, Speak Now World Tour – Live (2011).

On January 11, 2011, Swift performed "Sparks Fly" as part of an exclusive concert for the Allure of the Seas cruise in Mexico. She later performed "Sparks Fly" at the 2011 CMA Music Festival, held in August, and at a showcase in Rio de Janeiro, Brazil, in September 2012, with Brazilian singer-songwriter Paula Fernandes. Swift later included the track on the set list of the Red Tour (2013–2014); during the shows, she sang the song on a platform suspended from the ceiling. She performed it at the Formula 1 Grand Prix held on October 22, 2016, in Austin. "Sparks Fly" was also part of select shows for Swift's later tours, the 1989 World Tour (Vancouver, August 2015), Reputation Stadium Tour (Columbus, July 2018), and the Eras Tour (Nashville, May 2023 / Singapore, March 2024). She sang the song as part of a mashup with her song "I Can Fix Him (No Really I Can)" (2024) on the May 29, 2024, concert in Madrid as part of the Eras Tour.

== Music video ==
The music video for "Sparks Fly", directed by Christian Lamb, was released on August 10, 2011. It features footage from the Speak Now World Tour; much of the footage was captured at four tour date locations, including one from the show in Newark, New Jersey. Throughout the video, Swift is seen performing with many stage actors, dancers, and acrobats, through multiple costume changes, and slow motion is used extensively. Media publications praised the video's production quality with visually stimulating stage settings. During the week of its release, the music video accumulated over 400,000 views and helped Swift rise from number nineteen to ten on Billboard's Social 50 chart.

== Charts ==
=== Weekly charts ===
Weekly chart performance
Chart (2011–2012)	Peak position
Australia (ARIA)	97
Belgium (Ultratip Bubbling Under Flanders)	19
Canada Hot 100 (Billboard)	28
Canada Country (Billboard)	3
US Billboard Hot 100	17
US Hot Country Songs (Billboard)	1

=== Year-end charts ===
Year-end chart performance
Chart (2011)	Position
US Hot Country Songs (Billboard)	37

== Certifications ==
Certifications
Region	Certification	Certified units/sales
Australia (ARIA)	Platinum	70,000^{‡}
New Zealand (RMNZ)	Gold	15,000^{‡}
United States (RIAA)	Platinum	1,000,000^{‡}
^{‡} Sales+streaming figures based on certification alone.

== Release history ==
List of radio and release dates
Region	Date	Format	Label
United States	July 18, 2011	Country radio	Big Machine
United States	August 10, 2011	Limited edition CD single	Big Machine

== "Sparks Fly (Taylor's Version)" ==
"Sparks Fly (Taylor's Version)"

Song by Taylor Swift

from the album Speak Now (Taylor's Version)
- Released: July 7, 2023
- Studio: Blackbird (Nashville); Kitty Committee (London)
- Length: 4:21
- Label: Republic
- Songwriter: Taylor Swift
- Producers: Taylor Swift; Christopher Rowe

Lyric video
- "Sparks Fly (Taylor's Version)" on YouTube

After signing a new contract with Republic Records, Swift began re-recording her first six studio albums in November 2020. The decision came after the public 2019 dispute between Swift and the music executive Scooter Braun, who acquired Big Machine Records, including the masters of Swift's albums the label had released. By re-recording her catalog, Swift had full ownership of the new masters, including the copyright licensing of her songs, devaluing the Big Machine-owned masters.

Swift announced Speak Now (Taylor's Version), the re-recorded album of Speak Now, at the Eras Tour concert in Nashville on May 5, 2023. After the announcement, she performed "Sparks Fly" on acoustic guitar as a surprise song. The re-recorded track "Sparks Fly (Taylor's Version)" was released as part of Speak Now (Taylor's Version) on July 7, 2023. Clash's Alex Berry contended that the re-recorded song sounded "a little more tired" than the original due to Swift's vocals lacking "the same angsty rage".

=== Personnel ===
Adapted from Speak Now (Taylor's Version) digital album inline notes

- Taylor Swift – vocals, background vocals, songwriter, producer
- Christopher Rowe – producer, vocal engineer
- David Payne – recording engineer
- Lowell Reynolds – assistant recording engineer, editor
- Derek Garten – engineer, editor, programming
- Serban Ghenea – mixing
- Bryce Bordone – mix engineer
- Randy Merrill – mastering
- Matt Billingslea – drums, percussion
- Amos Heller – bass guitar
- Paul Sidoti – electric guitar
- Mike Meadows – acoustic guitar, Hammond B-3, mandolin, background vocals
- Max Bernstein – electric guitar
- Jonathan Yudkin – fiddle
- David Cook – piano

=== Charts ===
Chart performance for Taylor's version
Chart (2023)	Peak position
Australia (ARIA)	17
Canada Hot 100 (Billboard)	25
Global 200 (Billboard)	20
Greece International (IFPI)	80
Ireland (Billboard)	22
New Zealand (Recorded Music NZ)	20
Philippines (Billboard)	3
Singapore (RIAS)	9
South Korea Download (Circle)	179
UK Streaming (OCC)	40
US Billboard Hot 100	22
US Hot Country Songs (Billboard)	8

=== Certification ===
Certifications for Taylor's version
Region	Certification	Certified units/sales
Australia (ARIA)	Gold	35,000^{‡}
^{‡} Sales+streaming figures based on certification alone.

== See also ==
- List of Hot Country Songs number ones of 2011
