= List of Top Country Albums number ones of 2011 =

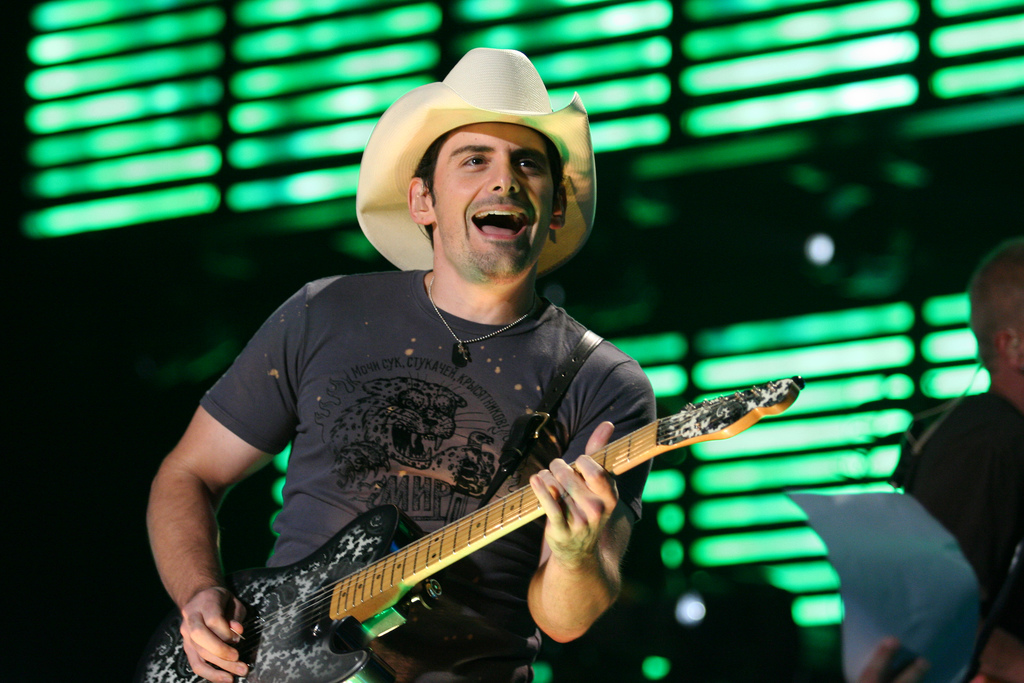
Brad Paisley spent two weeks at number one with This Is Country Music.

Top Country Albums is a chart that ranks the top-performing country music albums in the United States, published by Billboard. In 2011, 19 different albums topped the chart; placings were based on electronic point of sale data from retail outlets.

In the issue of Billboard dated January 1, Taylor Swift was at number one with Speak Now, the album's seventh week in the top spot. Swift's album held the peak position for the first seven weeks of 2011 before being displaced by Jason Aldean's My Kinda Party. The latter album was the year's longest-running chart-topper, spending 12 weeks atop the chart in five separate spells between February and July. It was displaced from the top spot for the first time in the issue dated March 5 by Need You Now by the group Lady Antebellum, which returned to number one having already spent 29 weeks at the top of the chart the previous year. The group was the only act to achieve more than one number one during 2011, as it returned to the top spot in October with Own the Night, which spent five non-consecutive weeks atop the chart before the end of the year and was the final chart-topper of 2011.

Half of the eighteen acts to top the chart in 2011 did so for the first time. In March, Aaron Lewis topped the chart with his first solo release, which was recorded in the country genre in contrast to his previous role as the lead vocalist of the alternative metal band Staind. In April, Alison Krauss & Union Station reached number one for the first time nearly 20 years after first entering the chart, and Ronnie Dunn achieved his first solo chart-topper two months later, following years of success as one half of the duo Brooks & Dunn. In July Justin Moore gained his first number one, and in August and September four consecutive chart-toppers were by acts which had not previously reached the top spot: Eric Church, Luke Bryan, Pistol Annies (although one member of the group, Miranda Lambert, had previously achieved number ones as a solo artist), and Jake Owen. Bryan, along with Jason Aldean, was associated with the so-called bro-country style, an emerging sub-genre which incorporated influences from rock music and hip hop and often featured lyrics relating to partying, attractive young women, and pick-up trucks. The final artist to reach number one for the first time was Scotty McCreery, who had won the tenth season of the TV singing competition American Idol earlier in the year. His album Clear as Day entered the chart at number one in the issue of Billboard dated October 22, and spent six weeks at number one before the end of the year in three separate spells.

== Chart history ==
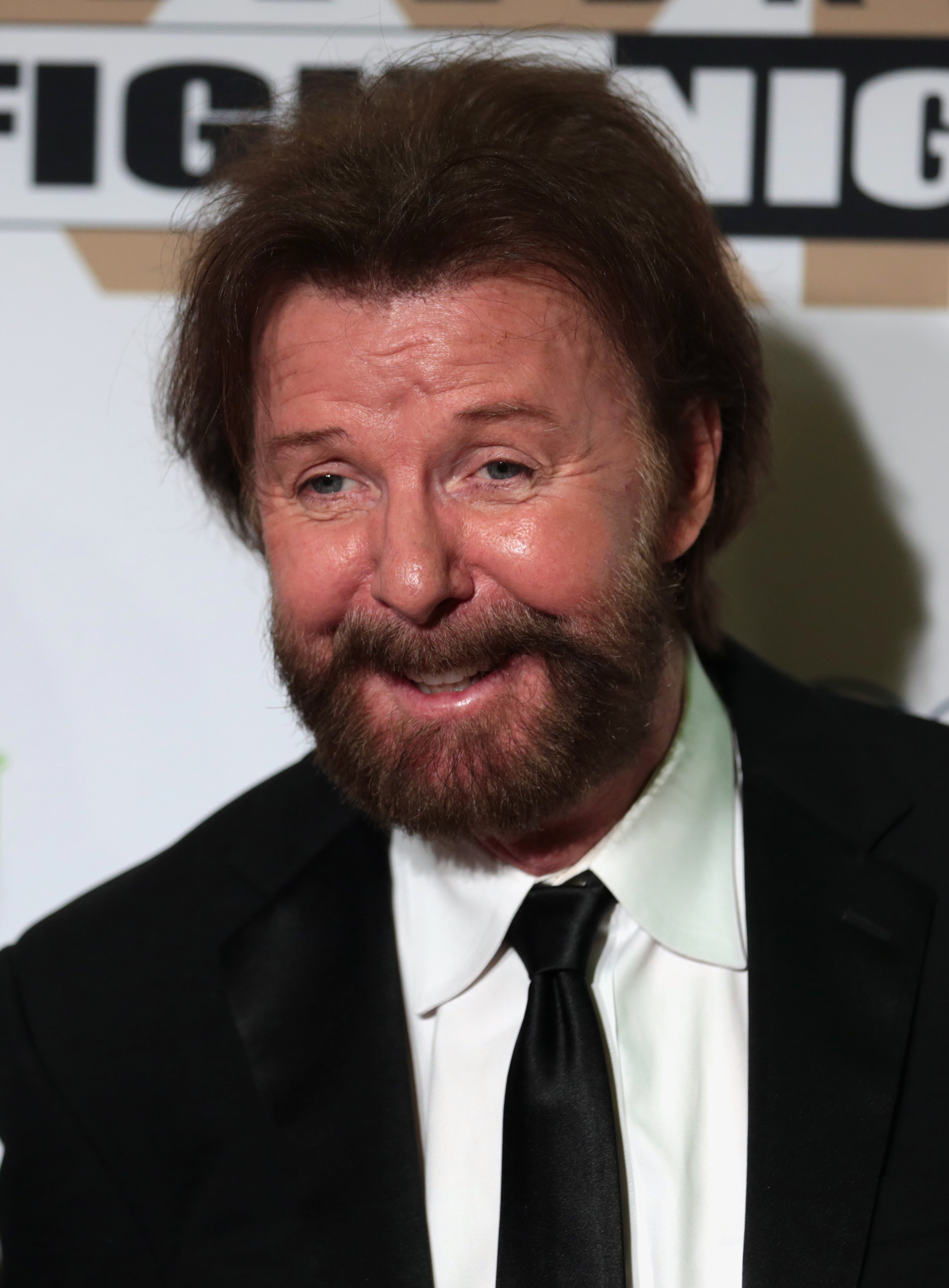
Ronnie Dunn had his first solo number one after many years of success as half of the duo Brooks & Dunn.

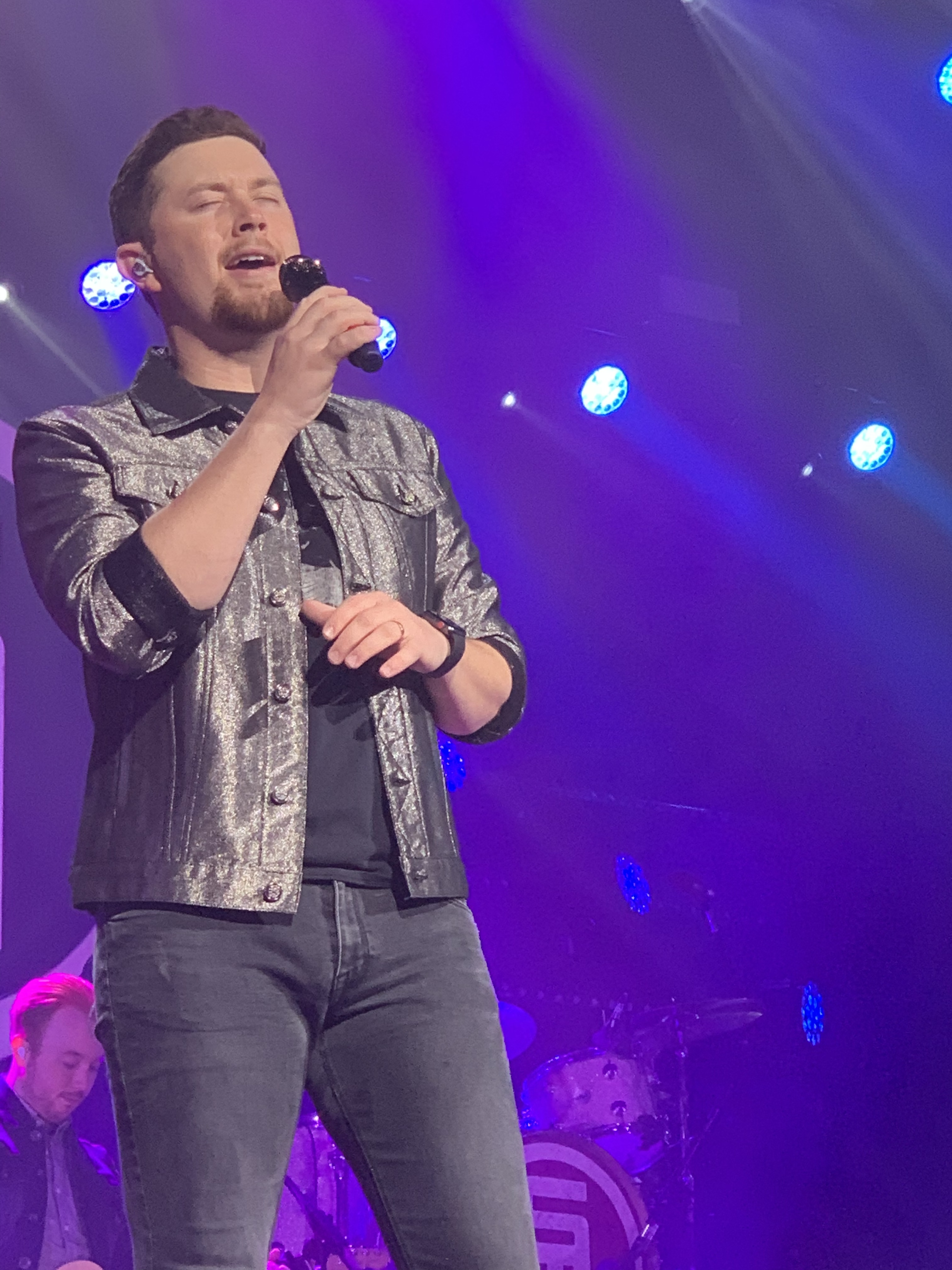
American Idol winner Scotty McCreery topped the chart in October.

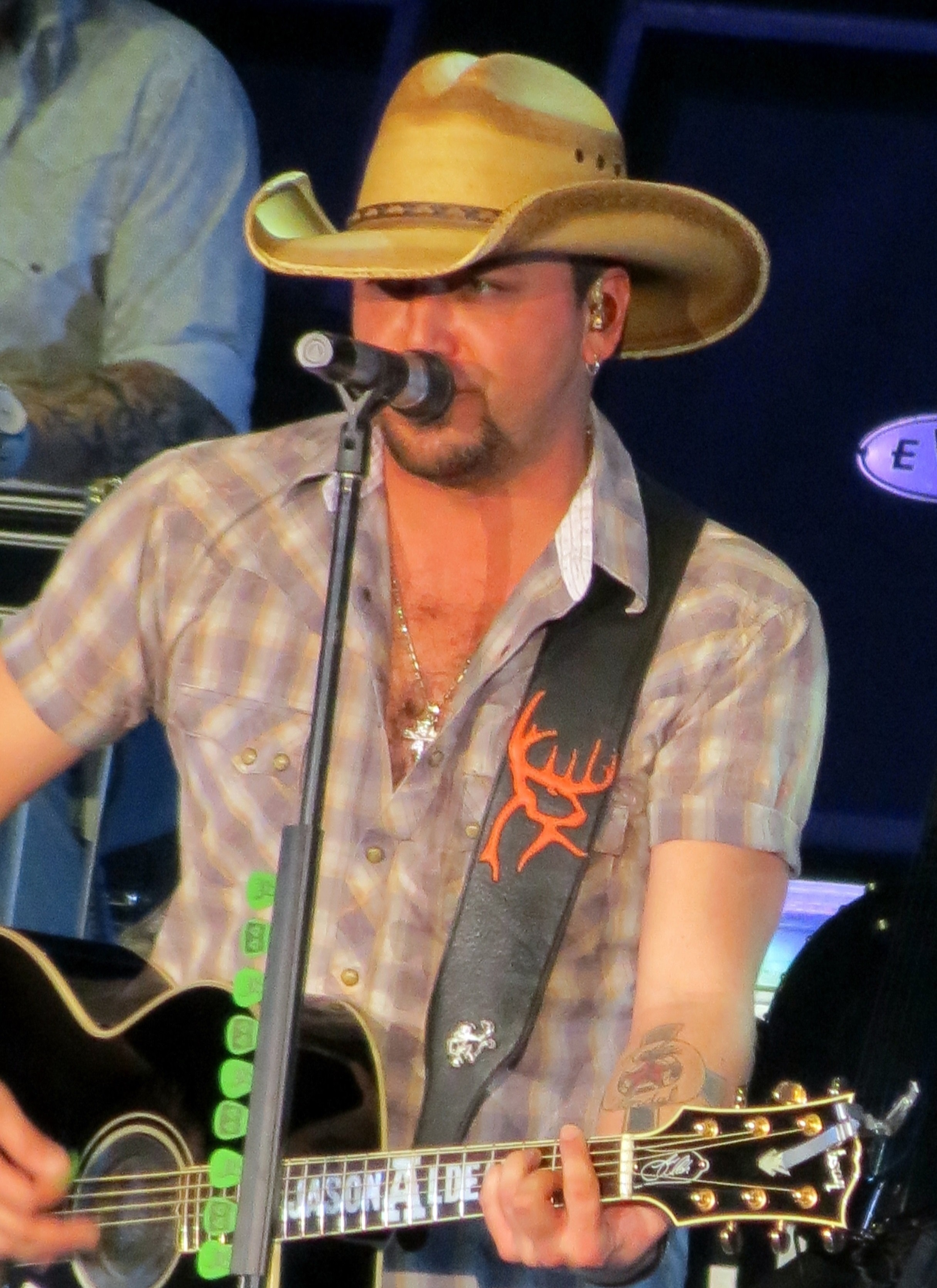
Jason Aldean's My Kinda Party was the year's longest-running number one.

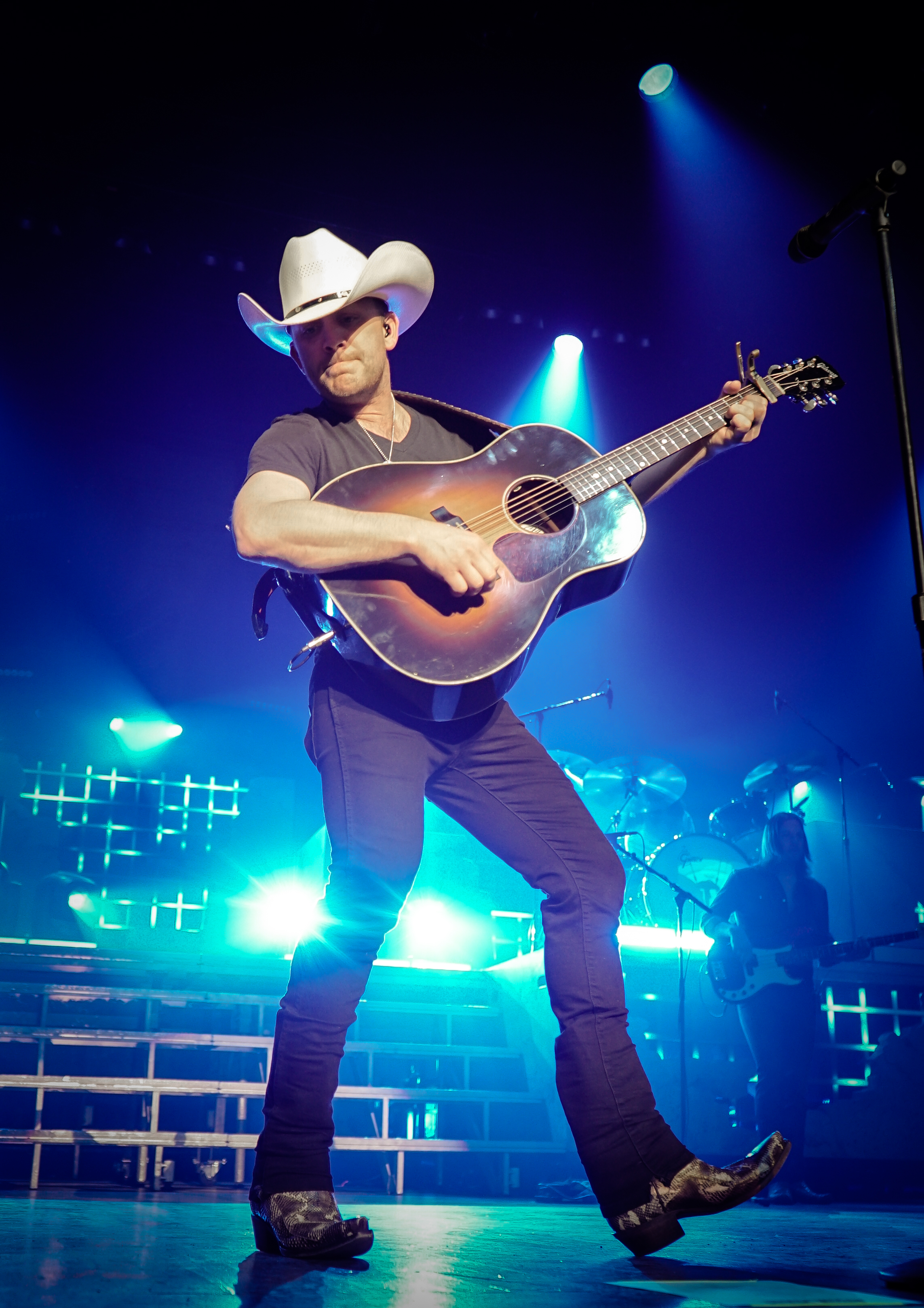
Outlaws Like Me was the first number one for Justin Moore.

| Issue date | Title | Artist(s) | Ref. |
|---|---|---|---|
| January 1 | Speak Now | Taylor Swift | |
| January 8 | Speak Now | Taylor Swift | |
| January 15 | Speak Now | Taylor Swift | |
| January 22 | Speak Now | Taylor Swift | |
| January 29 | Speak Now | Taylor Swift | |
| February 5 | Speak Now | Taylor Swift | |
| February 12 | Speak Now | Taylor Swift | |
| February 19 | My Kinda Party | Jason Aldean | |
| February 26 | My Kinda Party | Jason Aldean | |
| March 5 | Need You Now | Lady Antebellum | |
| March 12 | Need You Now | Lady Antebellum | |
| March 19 | Town Line | Aaron Lewis | |
| March 26 | Stronger | Sara Evans | |
| April 2 | Stronger | Sara Evans | |
| April 9 | My Kinda Party | Jason Aldean | |
| April 16 | My Kinda Party | Jason Aldean | |
| April 23 | My Kinda Party | Jason Aldean | |
| April 30 | Paper Airplane | Alison Krauss & Union Station | |
| May 7 | Paper Airplane | Alison Krauss & Union Station | |
| May 14 | My Kinda Party | Jason Aldean | |
| May 21 | My Kinda Party | Jason Aldean | |
| May 28 | My Kinda Party | Jason Aldean | |
| June 4 | My Kinda Party | Jason Aldean | |
| June 11 | This Is Country Music | Brad Paisley | |
| June 18 | This Is Country Music | Brad Paisley | |
| June 25 | Ronnie Dunn | Ronnie Dunn | |
| July 2 | My Kinda Party | Jason Aldean | |
| July 9 | Outlaws Like Me | Justin Moore | |
| July 16 | My Kinda Party | Jason Aldean | |
| July 23 | My Kinda Party | Jason Aldean | |
| July 30 | Red River Blue | Blake Shelton | |
| August 6 | Red River Blue | Blake Shelton | |
| August 13 | Chief | Eric Church | |
| August 20 | Chief | Eric Church | |
| August 27 | Tailgates & Tanlines | Luke Bryan | |
| September 3 | Tailgates & Tanlines | Luke Bryan | |
| September 10 | Hell on Heels | Pistol Annies | |
| September 17 | Barefoot Blue Jean Night | Jake Owen | |
| September 24 | Here for a Good Time | George Strait | |
| October 1 | Own the Night | Lady Antebellum | |
| October 8 | Own the Night | Lady Antebellum | |
| October 15 | Own the Night | Lady Antebellum | |
| October 22 | Clear as Day | Scotty McCreery | |
| October 29 | Clear as Day | Scotty McCreery | |
| November 5 | Clear as Day | Scotty McCreery | |
| November 12 | Clancy's Tavern | Toby Keith | |
| November 19 | Four the Record | Miranda Lambert | |
| November 26 | Four the Record | Miranda Lambert | |
| December 3 | Clear as Day | Scotty McCreery | |
| December 10 | Clear as Day | Scotty McCreery | |
| December 17 | Own the Night | Lady Antebellum | |
| December 24 | Clear as Day | Scotty McCreery | |
| December 31 | Own the Night | Lady Antebellum | |
