= Never Grow Up =

2010 song by Taylor Swift

Song by Taylor Swift

from the album Speak Now
- Released: October 25, 2010
- Genre: Folk; pop
- Length: 4:50
- Label: Big Machine
- Songwriter: Taylor Swift
- Producers: Taylor Swift; Nathan Chapman

Audio video
- "Never Grow Up" on YouTube

"Never Grow Up" is a song by the American singer-songwriter Taylor Swift from her third studio album, Speak Now (2010). She wrote the track inspired by her own feelings about childhood and growing up and handled the production with Nathan Chapman. An acoustic guitar-led folk and pop ballad, "Never Grow Up" deals with Swift's reflection and contemplation on her childhood. Critics interpreted the lyrics as a message to younger fans and girls about childhood and growing up.

In reviews of Speak Now, many critics found the song emotional and praised Swift's songwriting. They have retrospectively remained positive of the track and listed it in their rankings of her discography. Commercially, "Never Grow Up" reached number 84 and 12 on the US Billboard Hot 100 and Country Digital Song Sales charts, respectively. It received certifications in the United States and Australia. Swift performed the track outside the set lists on five of her concert tours. Following a 2019 dispute regarding the ownership of Swift's back catalog, she re-recorded the song as "Never Grow Up (Taylor's Version)" for the 2023 re-recorded album, Speak Now (Taylor's Version).

== Background and composition ==
Taylor Swift wrote her third studio album Speak Now (2010) entirely by herself and co-produced it with Nathan Chapman. She included all of the emotions she felt in the last two years on the album and conceived it as a collection of songs about the things she had wanted to but was unable to do with the people she had met in her life. One such song is "Never Grow Up", which Swift wrote for her younger self inspired by the nostalgia of her own childhood and the uncertainty of growing up. It is a folk and pop ballad led by an acoustic guitar (played by Chapman), lasting for four minutes and fifty seconds. Swift's vocals on the song are breathy, and she is accompanied by a background male vocalist. Critics deemed "Never Grow Up" one of Speak Now's most country-leaning tracks and the closest to Swift's previous works, with some believing that it could have been for her 2006 self-titled studio album. Rolling Stone's writer Rob Sheffield viewed the song as a "folksy fingerpicking change of pace" on Speak Now.

Based on confessional songwriting, the lyrics of "Never Grow Up" address Swift's reflection on her childhood. In the first verse, she takes on the perspective of a mother talking to a baby: "Your little eyelids flutter cause you're dreaming / So I tuck you in, turn on your favorite night light". Swift asks the baby to "never grow up" to keep up with their bond in the future. The next verse sees Swift observing a teenager convincing her mother to drop her off near a movie theater because she deems that it is not cool to see her at her age being dropped off by her parents. In the last verse, the perspective shifts to Swift herself, contemplating her childhood ("Wish I'd never grown up") and longingly looks back on it ("I could still be little"). She wants to remember all the memories ("Take pictures in your mind of your childhood room") but at the same time they are fading ("I just realized everything I have is someday gonna be gone").

Critics analyzed the lyrics as a message to younger girls and fans. In NME, Hannah Mylrea deemed it "Swift dealing out her best life advice for younger fans in particular". Sam Sodomsky of Pitchfork opined that she "[sounds] far older than her years as she urges girls younger than her to savor every moment" in their lives. Kate Atkinson from Billboard said that the song has a "universal" message of "trying to hold on to your own innocence and/or shielding the innocent ones around you". Matt Bjorke of Roughstock thought it was "written to a younger girl reminding her to cherish the moments" of her childhood as she grows fast and will "never [be] able to reclaim that carefree fantastic time of your life". For American Songwriter, Jacob Uitti believed that Swift was reaching out to her audience, particularly girls: "Sometimes we want to stay the same age, sometimes we want to be older. But no matter what we want, life happens."

== Release and live performances ==
"Never Grow Up" was included as the eight track on Speak Now, which was released on October 25, 2010, by Big Machine Records. In the United States, it peaked at number 84 on the Billboard Hot 100 and number 12 on the Country Digital Song Sales chart. On July 13, 2015, the song received a gold certification from the Recording Industry Association of America (RIAA) for selling 500,000 units in the US. In January 2024, it was certified platinum by the Australian Recording Industry Association (ARIA) for reaching 70,000 units in Australia.

After Speak Now's release, Swift performed "Never Grow Up" at selected locations of the album's associated world tour in 2011. These include Lexington, Houston, and Raleigh, all of which are where she performed an acoustic rendition of the song. In 2013, Swift sang the track with a guitar during a Washington concert of her Red Tour. On the August 15, 2015, show at Santa Clara of her 1989 World Tour, she performed "Never Grow Up" in dedication to her godson and the second child of the actress Jaime King. On her Reputation Stadium Tour (2018) and Eras Tour (2023–24), Swift sang it as a "surprise song"—a label for the songs she randomly plays throughout the concerts—in Philadelphia and Kansas City, respectively. She also performed the track two times as part of mashups of her songs during the Eras Tour in 2024; the first one was with "Robin" (2024) at a Zurich show on July 10 and the second with "The Best Day" (2008) at a Vancouver show on December 6.

== Critical reception ==
Initial reviews of "Never Grow Up" found the song vulnerable and praised Swift's songwriting. Chris Willman of Our Country described it as a "sweet lullabye with an undercurrent of sadness or even wary adult bitterness". Alex Macpherson from The Guardian believed that it was where Swift was at her most brave on the album and considered her singing to herself "devastating and genuinely uncomfortable". Sam Gnerre of the Los Angeles Daily News viewed the song as an "excellent ballad" and "a surprisingly prescient lullaby". Rick Moore from American Songwriter said that the "great opening lines and use of imagery" could see Swift start writing tracks without romance in them and become a "truly accomplished writer". Melinda Newman of HitFix wrote that the song was spare and lovely.

A few critics drew comparisons to other songs. The Los Angeles Times' writer Ann Powers likened it to Brad Paisley's "Letter to Me" (2007) conceptually but thought both songs had different takes on their theme. She also viewed the track as Swift's "most revealing" song to date. John J. Moser of The Morning Call considered "Never Grow Up" to have the opposite concept of her song "The Best Day" (2008) and one of the best tracks on the album where "Swift actually changes it up". Leah Greenblatt from Entertainment Weekly regarded the song as a "fragile lullaby" and the "soft-focus" reversal of Harry Chapin's track "Cat's in the Cradle" (1974). Other critics focused on other aspects of the song. Dave Heaton from PopMatters said that "Never Grow Up" had country radio potential and thought it showcased Swift's potential capability of "taking common country-radio templates and perfecting them". George Lang of The Oklahoman believed it was one of the tracks that prevented the album from becoming a "tabloid marathon". Matthew Horton of BBC Music regarded it as a "sunburst pop [nugget] that would brighten any daytime radio playlist".

Retrospective reviews of "Never Grow Up" remained positive. Atkinson and Sodomsky thought it was wistful and tender. The musicologist James E. Perone viewed "Never Grow Up" as a standout on the album and attributed it to the theme of childhood, which he lauded Swift's sentiments about it and how it complements with the composition. He also said that the song represented her growth as a songwriter, believing that she would explore more themes other than her autobiographical songwriting. James Rettig from Stereogum considered it one of the "most heart-wrenching" tracks from Swift's discography. Carena Liptak of Taste of Country and Martin Chilton of UDiscoverMusic considered the song highly introspective and praised the emotionalism that was displayed. Finley Liu from Young Post considered the song one of the album's underrated tracks.

"Never Grow Up" was included in the rankings of Swift's discography by Jane Song and a staff of Paste (at 56), Nate Jones of Vulture (92), Mylrea (106), and Sheffield (216). For Jones, the song was an example of her better writing with childhood than with old age, and he believed that the concept of children was well-written to the point "you'd swear she was secretly a 39-year-old mom". Song alongside Uitti wrote that it would make you emotional. The song was also featured in the rankings of 100 selected tracks from Swift by the editorial staff of Billboard and Roisin O'Connor of The Independent. Andrew Unterberger of the former considered the song a "sort of childhood trilogy closer" after "Mary's Song (Oh My My My)" (2006) and "The Best Day" and thought it was given "unexpected gravity" in the end, while O'Connor believed that the "tender acoustic picking" complemented by the vocals made the song soothing.

== Charts ==
2010 chart performance
Chart (2010)	Peak position
US Billboard Hot 100	84
US Country Digital Song Sales (Billboard)	12

== Certifications ==
Certifications
Region	Certification	Certified units/sales
Australia (ARIA)	Platinum	70,000^{‡}
United States (RIAA)	Gold	500,000^{‡}
^{‡} Sales+streaming figures based on certification alone.

== "Never Grow Up (Taylor's Version)" ==
"Never Grow Up (Taylor's Version)"

Song by Taylor Swift

from the album Speak Now (Taylor's Version)
- Released: July 7, 2023
- Length: 4:52
- Label: Republic
- Songwriter: Taylor Swift
- Producers: Taylor Swift; Christopher Rowe

Lyric video
- "Never Grow Up (Taylor's Version)" on YouTube

Swift departed from Big Machine and signed a new contract with Republic Records in 2018. She began re-recording her first six studio albums in November 2020. The decision followed a 2019 dispute between Swift and the talent manager Scooter Braun, who acquired Big Machine Records, over the masters of Swift's albums that the label had released. By re-recording the albums, Swift had full ownership of the new masters, which enabled her to encourage licensing of her re-recorded songs for commercial use in hopes of substituting the Big Machine-owned masters. She denoted the re-recordings with a "Taylor's Version" subtitle.

The re-recording of the track, titled "Never Grow Up (Taylor's Version)", was included on Speak Now (Taylor's Version), which is the re-recording of Speak Now released on July 7, 2023. In comparison to the original, it is two seconds longer in length and her voice has a tad less twang and is somewhat fuller. The re-recording peaked at number 71 on the Billboard Global 200 and reached the countries of the Philippines (15) and Canada (59). In the United States, it debuted and peaked at number 58 on the Billboard Hot 100 and number 27 on Hot Country Songs.

=== Critical reception ===
Several critics discussed the track with the new context of Swift's growth. Alex Hopper of American Songwriter, Mike DeWald of Riff Magazine, and Mark Sutherland of Rolling Stone UK found the song vulnerable and believed that it was further heightened by Swift being an adult. The Washington Post's Chris Richards viewed the re-recording as "reinhabiting her 20-year-old psyche as she sings to both her past and future selves" and believed that the "titular refrain" brought "a sort of nostalgic claustrophobia". For Pitchfork, Vrinda Jagota thought that towards the end the song "reveals itself as a means of mourning her past self" and promises that no one will ever leave or harm Swift.

There were comments on the production and her performance. DeWald said that the song sounds "like a track straight out" of Swift's album Folklore (2020), and where her vocal growth is particularly evident. Poppie Platt of The Telegraph stated that although her singing may seem jarring at first, her "grasp on tone and melody has much improved since her [early] days" that it is still effective. Financial Times' Ludovic Hunter-Tinley believed that the slight changes in her voice in the re-recording compared to that of the original "give the song a subliminally different sense of age". Kate Solomon from the I Paper wrote that the track would only be "annoying and cliched" but she believed that the re-recording was still faithful to the original.

=== Credits ===
Adapted from Speak Now (Taylor's Version) digital album inline notes

Studios

- Swift's vocals recorded at Kitty Committee Studios (London)
- Digitally edited and additionally engineered at Prime Recording (Nashville, Tennessee)
- Mixed at MixStar Studios (Virginia Beach, Virginia)
- Mastered at Sterling Sound (Edgewater, New Jersey)

Personnel

- Taylor Swift – lead vocals, backing vocals, songwriting, production
- Christopher Rowe – production, vocal recording
- Mike Meadows – acoustic guitar, backing vocals
- David Payne – engineering
- Lowell Reynolds – digital editing
- Derek Garten – digital editing, additional engineering
- Serban Ghenea – mixing
- Bryce Bordone – engineering for mix
- Randy Merrill – mastering

=== Charts ===
Chart performance for Taylor's version
Chart (2023)	Peak position
Canada Hot 100 (Billboard)	59
Global 200 (Billboard)	71
Philippines (Billboard)	15
US Billboard Hot 100	58
US Hot Country Songs (Billboard)	27
