= Rajiv Patel =

Rajiv Divyang Patel
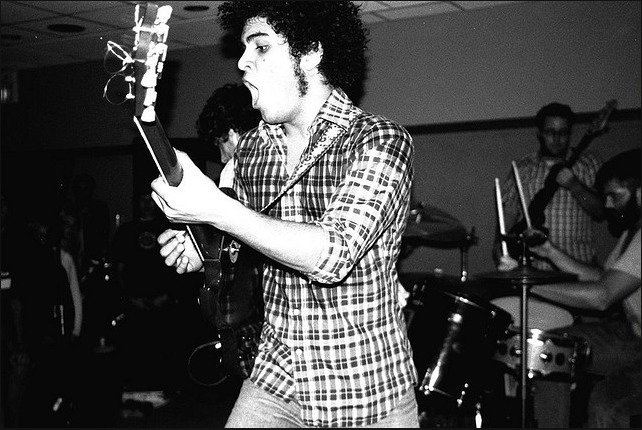
- Patel while performing with Before Braille

Background information
- Genres: indie rock
- Occupation: Guitarist
- Years active: 2002-2004, 2006–present
- Labels: Sunset Alliance

Rajiv Patel is an American musician and solo guitarist.

== Career ==
=== Patel's Bands ===
Soon after Before Braille recorded its debut LP, The Rumor, Patel was recruited and joined the band as its new lead guitarist. Although only in high school, Patel would influenced the style of Before Braille's music.

Patel is also known for his work as lead bass player in the band The Letterpress. Unlike many other bands, The Letterpress lacked any guitars, featuring only two bass players and a drummer. This, however, allowed the band to showcase Patel's skills in quite a different way to make up for the lack of guitarists.

=== Patel's solo work ===
In addition to his work as a member of various bands, Patel garnered attention as a solo guitarist. Because of his unique style, which draws on rock and Middle-Eastern influences, many critics agree that his music might take a couple listens to get used to, yet all appear to enjoy his work, noting that "If you take the time to get into it, you’ll REALLY like this." Ron Trembath at FensePost.com provides another example of the critical acclaim for Patel's solo work, calling it "the fresh cigarette on a Sunday morning or, if you prefer, the black coffee for the unsurpassed rain. This is just plain wonderful."

Critics are "blown away by what an amazing guitarist he is" and finding it "hard to believe someone could make that much music with just one instrument".

=== Patel's musical hiatus and return ===
In 2004, Patel took a two-year hiatus from the music industry to do missionary work in Peru for the Church of Jesus Christ of Latter-day Saints (LDS Church). After returning from Peru, Patel got back into music. However, because Before Braille broke up while he was still in South America, he initially pursued other projects. One of them, for example, was a venture with former members of Before Braille and Jared Woosley of Fivespeed called Red Means Red, although it does not appear that this band ever really got off the ground. Then in 2009, Patel released his first solo recording in five years, the Get Phased EP, and toured with Dear and the Headlights as both an opening act, as well as its bass player.

== Discography ==
=== Solo albums ===
Release date	Title	Label	Notes
2003	Obey the Cattle	Sunset Alliance	
2004	Of Black Water	Sunset Alliance	
2009	Get Phased EP	Sunset Alliance	This was initially released as a tour EP, that later became available to the broader public.

=== Albums with bands ===
Release date	Band	Title	Label	Notes
?	The Retaliation for What They Have Done to Us	Self-Titled	Sunset Alliance	Patel's song Bipolar Bear, which appears on his Of Black Water album, is a hidden track on this album.
2003	The Letterpress	Input/Output	Sunset Alliance	Ravij Patel played bass in this band instead of guitar.
2004	Before Braille	Cattle Punching on a Jack Rabbit EP	Sunset Alliance	
2004	Before Braille	Balance and Timing EP	Sunset Alliance, Bad News Bears Records	
2005	Before Braille	Tired of Not Being Away From Here	Sunset Alliance, You and Whose Army? Records	
2009	Before Braille	Kill the Messenger, Keep the Message	Sunset Alliance	
2009	Before Braille	Spring Cleaning	Sunset Alliance	The songs Ticker Tape Charade and Oh Well appear to be directly influenced by Patel's Make Like a Tree and Deer in the Headlights, respectively.
2011	Before Braille	Instrumentals	Sunset Alliance	

=== Solo Contributions to Compilations ===
- Americopa Mantle, Vol. 1 (Sunset Alliance, 2003)

Song: Rock 'N Roll Friends Check Each Others' Books Back In
