= Kill the Messenger, Keep the Message =

Studio album by Before Braille
- Released: 2009
- Recorded: Flying Blanket Recording
- Genre: Indie rock, experimental rock, post-rock, math rock
- Length: 53:40
- Label: Sunset Alliance (ALLY 032)
- Producer: Bob Hoag and Before Braille

Before Braille chronology
Tired of Not Being Away From Here (2005)	Kill the Messenger, Keep the Message (2009)	Spring Cleaning (2009)

Kill the Messenger, Keep the Message is the sixth studio album, and third LP, recorded by the indie rock band, Before Braille. It was released in 2009 by Sunset Alliance.

== History ==
Before Braille originally started working on this record in 2003. However, after releasing Tired of Not Being Away From Here, the band took an unexpected hiatus (i.e., it broke up). Consequently, work on its last album took much longer than previously planned, lasting up to five years while being recorded over multiple sessions. Preparations to finally put the record into a marketable condition did not finally begin in earnest until December 2007.

This was a highly anticipated record as the band told its fans about it for many years prior to its release. David Jensen describes the album as musically somewhere right between former efforts Cattle Punching on a Jack Rabbit and The Rumor and credits Led Zeppelin for the sound that the band essayed to reproduce with its guitars and drums. Furthermore, the members of the band described this as the best material that they had ever recorded.

Among the notable songs on the album include:

- "Wolves in Wolves' Clothing," which was inspired by the head of A&R at Aezra Records. This song was played regularly on Before Braille's early tours and it was the first time that Jared Woosley contributed vocals to a Before Braille song since "Twenty-four minus Eighteen" on The Rumor.
- "Debutant Stomp" was originally recorded in 2003. However, it took a while for singer David Jensen to figure out how to track vocals around a song so inspired by Rajiv Patel's guitar-noodling style.

With the demise of Before Braille having so recently occurred, a message was left in the artwork of this record's booklet, apparently addressing many of the problems that ultimately led to the band's end.

== Album Information ==
This album was recorded and produced at Flying Blanket Recording by Bob Hoag in 2003, 2004, 2007, and 2008. Before Braille members appearing on the record include: David Jensen, Brandon Smith, Rajiv Patel, Hans Ringger, and Kelly Reed. Also appearing on the record are Jared Woosley of Fivespeed, lending vocals to the song Wolves in Wolves' Clothing; Paul Jensen, lending vocals to the song Start Dictation/End Transmission; and Jason Corman (a.k.a. Mr. Fantastical), playing guitar on two songs and also lending vocals.

The artwork and design for this record was done by Jason Byron Nelson and was inspired by his original design, "Flowers in the Attic."

== Reception ==
Although it was "quietly" released following Before Braille's break-up, Kill the Messenger, Keep the Message has nevertheless received positive reviews. For example, Music Snobs Anonymous lists Kill the Messenger, Keep the Message as number 74 among the best albums of the 2000s. In addition, while reviewing Kill the Messenger, Keep the Message, Josh Macala at Raised by Gypsies found that Before Braille "had this quality that made them stand out," before concluding that "it is rare to find a band that can rock this hard and also make this much noise lyrically."

== Track listing ==
No.	Title	Length
1.	"Thread the Line"	3:31
2.	"Subject Predicate"	2:53
3.	"The Gathering"	4:02
4.	"Secret No. 8"	3:46
5.	"Ventolin"	4:22
6.	"Wolves in Wolves' Clothing"	4:17
7.	"Bad Habits Make New Friends (Blood Son)"	6:11
8.	"(The Annex)ation of Islam"	3:52
9.	"Help is in the Way"	5:34
10.	"Debutante Stomp"	4:41
11.	"Secret No. 9"	4:14
12.	"Start Dictation/End Transmission"	6:17
