= The Letterpress =

American rock band

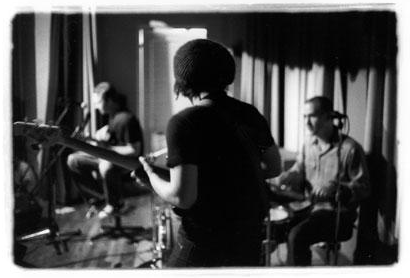

Background information
- Origin: Mesa, Arizona, United States
- Genres: Math rock, indie rock, emo
- Labels: Sunset Alliance
- Past members: Jeremy Drysdale - Bass, Vocals; Rajiv Patel - Lead Bass; Dustin Carson - Drums; Braden McCall (short stint) - Guitar

The Letterpress was a rock band from Mesa, Arizona, most widely known for its lack of guitars, as the band originally only consisted of two basses and a drum set.

== History ==
The Letterpress was formed with the idea of doing something different, taking then-current Before Braille guitarist Rajiv Patel and placing a bass in his hands, placing him with a former member of Before Braille, Dustin Carson, on drums, and then finishing up the trio was Jeremy Drysdale, of Noah Blake, who would sing and also play bass. The product of this composition would lead to, what one critic called, "rhythmically beautiful melodies . . . that really can't be compared directly to another band." Notwithstanding that critics view of the band's original sound, the Letterpress would draw comparisons to Pinback during most of its activity.

When Rajiv Patel left the band in 2004 to serve a mission in Peru for the Church of Jesus Christ of Latter-day Saints (LDS Church), he was replaced by another former member of Before Braille, Braden McCall, and demoed one song with McCall titled Physical Map, which was released on the band's MySpace page. This, however, was a departure from what originally made the band novel, since McCall played the guitar. Nevertheless, it appears that McCall's activity with the band was short-lived, as he later left the Letterpress to focus his efforts on his other band, Alcohol(iday).

Although Rajiv Patel had expressed his desire to return the Letterpress following his mission to record more material, it seems that the original iteration would reunite only once more to perform with Before Braille, Fivespeed, The Player Piano, and Novi Split during Sunset Alliance's ten-year anniversary show in January 2010.

== Discography ==
=== Solo albums ===
Release date	Title	Label	Notes
2004	Input/Output	Sunset Alliance	

=== Compilations ===
- Sunset Alliance Discography 2002-2004 (Sunset Alliance 2011)

Various former releases
