= Spring cleaning (disambiguation) =

Spring cleaning is the practice of thoroughly cleaning a house in the springtime.

Spring Cleaning may also refer to:

- Spring Cleaning (play), a 1925 play
- Spring Cleaning (album), a 2009 album by Before Braille
- The Spring Cleaning, a 1908 children's book by Frances Hodgson Burnett
- "Spring Cleaning", a song on the album One Jug of Wine, Two Vessels by Bright Eyes (band)
- "Spring Cleaning", an episode of Superstore
