= Visconte =

Visconte may refer to:

- Viscount
- Half Visconte, American indie rock group
- Rocky Visconte (born 1990), Australian soccer player
- Visconte Maggiolo (1478–1530), Italian cartographer and sailor
