= Spring Cleaning (album) =

Studio album by Before Braille
- Released: July 2, 2009
- Genre: Indie rock, Pop rock, Math Rock
- Length: 79:12
- Label: Sunset Alliance Records
- Producer: Bob Hoag & Before Braille

Before Braille chronology
Kill the Messenger, Keep the Message (2009)	Spring Cleaning (2009)	Before Braille Instrumentals (2011)

Spring Cleaning is the sixth studio album released by the indie rock band Before Braille. It was released on July 2, 2009, by Sunset Alliance Records.

== Album Information ==
The album's official name is: Spring Cleaning...Cut, Clean, Scab, Scar, Rewind, Remind, Repeat. The idea of releasing this record appears to have solidified in December 2007, during Kill the Messenger, Keep the Message's final weeks of production. Almost a record of B-sides and rare tracks, David Jensen, former lead-singer of the group, described it as a "collection of songs that were never given their chance on the stage." In the end, the record contains: nine brand new tracks; five out of print compilation songs; two songs from Before Braille's first recording, the Triplesplit, re-recorded and remastered; and, acoustic recordings of three songs from The Rumor.

Of the "new tracks" that were released on this record, many were actually old songs that had never been properly recorded and released. For example, "This is Not Theory" and "Hooray for Yourself" were originally recorded in 2001 as part of a demo that the band did for Aezra Records. Some of them were re-recorded after the band left Aezra in 2003 and then finished off in 2007. Another such song is "Five Minute Warning (R is for Regret)." According to the band, this song was a fan favorite during their earliest years, although it was never recorded.

Making appearances on this record are: Ian Metzger of Dear and the Headlights on the track "Colic"; Robin Wilson of the Gin Blossoms on the track "Hooray for Yourself"; and, Jason Corman (i.e. Mr. Fantastical) who makes guitar contributions throughout. Bob Hoag served, once again, as producer, and Chuckie Duff at Common Wall Media took care of the album art and design.

== Track listing ==
No.	Title	Length
1.	"Up, Up, Down, Down, Left, Right, Left, Right, B, A, Select Start"	3:43
2.	"Hooray for Yourself"	3:17
3.	"Venom by Memory"	5:46
4.	"Elected to Die"	3:39
5.	"This Is Not Theory"	4:42
6.	"Oh Well (Fountain Street)"	3:12
7.	"Colic"	4:52
8.	"Red Tape"	2:59
9.	"Not Tonight Not Ever"	3:21
10.	"Limb from Limb"	2:48
11.	"Five Minute Warning (R Is for Regret)"	5:13
12.	"Merry Christmas, I'm Cheating"	3:29
13.	"Ticker Tape Charade"	3:47
14.	"Good Night Quiet Noise (acoustic)"	3:22
15.	"Cinema Spine (acoustic)"	4:25
16.	"24 Minus 18 (acoustic)"	4:00
17.	"Gathering (acoustic)"	4:16
18.	"Merry Christmas I'm Cheating (acoustic)"	3:44
19.	"Making a Meal Outta You [Gouge Potato Instru-Mental Version]"	2:30
20.	"Thank You (Goodbye Archive)"	6:07
