= Jazz Odyssey =

Jazz Odyssey may refer to:

- Jacob Fred Jazz Odyssey, a musical group
- "Jazz Odyssey", a song by Audio Adrenaline from the album Bloom, 1996
- "Jazz Odyssey", a song by Liquid Tension Experiment from the album Spontaneous Combustion, 2007
- "Jazz Odyssey", a song by the Player Piano from the album Satellite, 2007
