= Not One Light Red: A Modified Document =

Studio album by Various Artists
- Released: 2000
- Genre: indie rock
- Length: 74:46
- Label: Sunset Alliance (SA 006); This Argonaut Records

Not One Light Red chronology
| Not One Light Red: A Modified Document (2000) | Not One Light Red: A Desert Extended (2003) |

Not One Light Red: A Modified Document is a compilation album created by Scott Tennent (formerly of Half Visconte and then the current manager of Modified Arts) and David Jensen (formerly of Before Braille) to serve 3 essential missions. Its first mission was to create a record that would showcase and introduce local Phoenix bands to the rest of the United States. Second, it was supposed to serve to help promote the local Phoenix music and art venue, The Modified (also known as Modified Arts). Finally, it was to serve as a springboard for a national independent record label based in the Phoenix area along the same lines as Kill Rock Stars in Olympia, Washington and Dischord Records in Washington, D.C.

Notable tracks on the record include:

- So Proud of You by Go Big Casino. Go Big Casino is Jim Adkins' (of Jimmy Eat World) solo-project, and So Proud of You was his first commercially released recording under that moniker. In fact, his presence on this record was actually one of the factors that allowed it to obtain a national distribution.
- Second Rome by Seven Storey. This was Seven Storey's first release after shortening its name from Seven Storey Mountain following the band's quasi-dissolution, as well as the first song released by Lance Lammers since his Based On a True Story EP on Deep Elm Records.
- Leave this City by Reubens Accomplice. This is one of the first commercially released recordings by Reubens Accomplice before the release of their first LP, I Blame the Scenery on Better Looking Records.
- A Clear Complextion by Pollen. This was a hard to find song from their years on Wind Up Records.
- Blood Over Wine by Fivespeed. This is one of the earliest releases put out by former Virgin Records band, Fivespeed.
- No Karate Chops by Before Braille. Although the recording would still sound mostly like a demo, this would also be the first commercially released track by Before Braille. This song would later be re-recorded and re-released as The Jaws of Life on The Rumor.

The art for the album also reflects its desire to promote the Phoenix-based artists showcased at The Modified. Its cover art is a painting called "The Swimmer" by Sergio Aguirre, and the rest of the packaging features paintings and illustrations by Brent Bond, Jill Betterly, and Lisa Williamson.

Three years later, Sunset Alliance worked to continue this series by releasing Not One Light Red: A Desert Extended This record would hope to extend interest in Phoenix bands by also including some national and international favorites such as Cursive and Kristofer Astrom.

== Track listing ==
| No. | Title | Length |
|---|---|---|
| 1. | "Second Rome by Seven Storey" | 3:45 |
| 2. | "Blood Over Wine by Fivespeed" | 3:23 |
| 3. | "Morning, Noon and Nite by Sea of Cortez" | 4:32 |
| 4. | "While You're Away by Harcuvar" | 4:40 |
| 5. | "So Proud of You by Go Big Casino" | 3:30 |
| 6. | ""Make A Wish" by Pinewood Derby" | 4:54 |
| 7. | ""Killing Hope" by Redfield" | 3:18 |
| 8. | "No Karate Chops by Before Braille" | 4:08 |
| 9. | "Procession, Part II by Sextet" | 3:53 |
| 10. | "A Clear Complexion by Pollen" | 4:45 |
| 11. | "Feel Like Another by ...And Guppies Eat Their Young" | 3:46 |
| 12. | "Follow Through #1 by Scott Tennent" | 5:07 |
| 13. | "Leave the City by Reubens Accomplice" | 3:22 |
| 14. | "We Don't Care What They Do Up North by Fightshy" | 6:14 |
| 15. | "Name Your Poison by Death of Marat" | 5:17 |
| 16. | "Ready by Chula" | 2:19 |
| 17. | "Blue-eyed Baldwin by Half Visconte" | 7:53 |
