= After the fact =

After the fact is an idiom meaning too late, or after something is finished

It may also refer to:

- After the Fact (Rodriguez album) 1976 album by Sixto Rodriguez (reissue of his 1971 album Coming from Reality)
- After the Fact (Magazine album) 1982 album by the band Magazine
- Ex post facto law, a law that retroactively changes the legal consequences of an action
- A posteriori, a Latin phrase referring to the epistemological concept of deriving knowledge from past experience
- "After the Fact", a song by the Player Piano from the album Satellite
