= Tired of Not Being Away from Here =

Tire of Not Being Away From Here

Studio album by Before Braille
- Released: 2005
- Recorded: Flying Blanket Recording
- Genre: Indie rock, Experimental rock, Post-rock, Math rock
- Length: 46:53
- Label: You and Whose Army? Records; Common Wall Media; Sunset Alliance (ALLY 028)
- Producer: Bob Hoag and Before Braille

Before Braille chronology
Balance and Timing (2004)	Tire of Not Being Away From Here (2005)	Kill the Messenger, Keep the Message (2009)

Tired of Not Being Away from Here is the fifth studio album, and second LP, recorded by the indie rock band, Before Braille. It was released in 2005 in the United Kingdom by You and Whose Army? Records, and distributed in the United States by Sunset Alliance and Common Wall Media.

This enhanced CD/LP contains all of the songs on the successful, limited release Cattle Punching on a Jack Rabbit EP, but adds an additional five songs, a hidden track, and has five videos.

== Album information ==
This enhanced CD/LP contains all of the songs on the successful, limited release Cattle Punching on a Jack Rabbit EP, but adds an additional five songs, a hidden track, and contains five videos.

Members of Before Braille that contributed to the recording of this album include: David Jensen, Brandon Buckmister, Kelly Reed, and Rajiv Patel. Also contributing to this album were: Gary Church on Cornet, Joe Hopkins on saxophone and clarinet, and John Woodcock on violin.

This album was recorded, mixed, and co-produced by Bob Hoag at Flying Blanket Recordings, and then mastered by Jason Livermore at the Blasting Room. Its artwork was done by Mel Kadel and its layout was completed by Jason Farrell.

== Reception ==
=== Critical reception ===
While this second LP departs from the more hook-driven sound of Before Braille's first effort, The Rumor, the critical consensus was very positive.

For example, according to Chelsea Ide of the Phoenix New Times, "Tired of Not Being Away From Here has the same signature style as other Before Braille records -- powerful rock with gut-wrenching lyrics -- but with this latest effort, the Phoenix band has spread its wings a bit wider" to offer a fuller sound "with stronger guitar bridges throughout."

Reviewing all of these same songs when they were released on the limited Cattle Punching on a Jack Rabbit EP, critics at Interpunk.com took notice of this difference as well, remarking that in "the past, people have tried to lump [ Before Braille ] into some sort of indie-pop rock category--maybe due to their success at CMJ & college radio--but this record is far edgier than anything they've done in the past." However, this "fresh and determined" new sound comes off as "an interesting, triumphant achievement."

=== Commercial reception ===
Even though Sunset Alliance Records lacked the money (and thus promotional power) of Before Braille's first record label, Aezra Records, Tired of Not Being Away From Here's commercial reception is a testament to the popularity of the band, and to its fans' efforts to hear the music. Upon release, Tired of Not Being Away From Here made at least a 5-week run on the CMJ 200 charts, and peaked at number 77.

== Track listing ==
No.	Title	Length
1.	"New Vein"	0:56
2.	"Proventil"	3:27
3.	"Well as Well"	4:25
4.	"The Case is Out"	4:03
5.	"We're Not Paying for Anything Anymore"	2:57
6.	"Losing Feeling"	2:57
7.	"Ideas vs. Protocol vs. Molotov"	3:48
8.	"The French Quarter Does Not Add Up"	3:23
9.	"Camera Disdain"	4:25
10.	"Fight or Flight"	3:33
11.	"Welcome Away"	13:00
