= Lucidity (web series) =

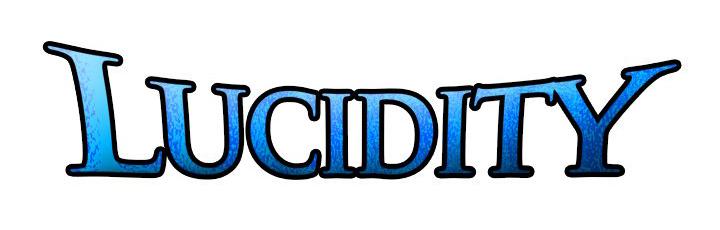
- Genre: Comedy
- Created by: Sean Oliver and Danny Torgersen
- Written by: Sean Oliver and Danny Torgersen
- Directed by: Sean Oliver and Danny Torgersen
- Starring: Sean Oliver; Danny Torgersen; Kandyce Hughes; Cassidy Hilgers; Bill
- Composer: Danny Torgersen
- Country of origin: United States
- Original language: English
- No. of episodes: 7

Production
- Producers: Simon Navarro; Keenan James; Drew Leatham; Jason McClellan; Cody Hunt; Sean Oliver; Danny Torgersen
- Production locations: Arizona; California; Nevada
- Running time: Varies

Original release
- Network: iTunes; Vimeo; YouTube
- Release: January 2, 2010 – present

Lucidity: The Web Saga is a metaphysical comedy web series produced by Third Productions. The program was created and written by Sean Oliver and Danny Torgersen, who co-star as George (Torgersen) and Jason (Oliver). In addition to screening at the 2013 Phoenix Comicon, Lucidity was an Official Selection at the L.A. Web Series Festival in 2011, 2012, and 2013. Winning The Saga multiple awards in Directing, Editing, Composition, and Special Effects

== Synopsis ==
Lucidity takes place in the astral dream world. The series begins with two roommates, George and Jason, who for reasons unknown share each other's dreams. The two have no control over their dreams and as the astral world increasingly encroaches on their real lives they decide to take action. This decision sends the roommates on an out-of-body adventure that neither of them were prepared for.

== Episodes ==
No.	Title	Length
I	"Decisions"	10:16
George and Jason are on the search for a new roommate while attempting to keep their mysterious dream connection a secret. Jason's mother grows concerned for the boys and their low quality of life.
II	"Responsibility and Endurance"	12:17
George and Jason attempt to balance their personal and work lives, while the dream world becomes increasingly unstable.
III	"Liquor Money and Premonitions"	15:20
Jason begins looking for an answer to his metaphysical connection to George in response to the growing insanity.
IV	"Lucidity"	19:43
George and Jason stumble across a mysterious DVD that teaches them how to lucid dream. Hopefully, they will end their psychic problems by learning to control their dreams.
V	"F**king Imbeciles"	28:42
After gaining lucidity George & Jason embark on their first lucid dream adventure only to discover that they have less dream control than expected.
VI	"Clearly Glitched"	42:06
After bringing someone back from the dream world George and Jason scramble to find a solution, but stumble upon something far greater...their Destiny.
VII	"Neogenic Nightmare"	22:42
George and Jason attempt to bury their past, literally, and avoid any further dream complications. But the dream asserts itself and forces them to try and clean up the mess that they are most certainly responsible for.
VIII	"The Ones"	41:47
George and Jason wander through the dream world attempting to locate the mysterious X on The Map. But after running into some old friends the two roommates are forced to visit their worst fears.

== Cast and Producers ==
=== Cast ===
- Jason - Sean Oliver

- George - Danny Torgersen

- Bill - Bill

- Dream Girl/Melody/Siren 1/Lady Vamp 3 - Cassidy Hilgers

- Ricky - Keenan James

- Arnold - Drew Leatham

- Chris - John Knott

- Miss K - Kandyce Hughes

- Lucid Hunter - Matt Bartos
- The Wizard - Zach Hilgers

=== Producers ===
Simon Navarro
Keenan James
Drew Leatham
Jason McClellan
Cody Hunt
Sean Oliver
Danny Torgersen

== Original Lucidity Soundtrack ==
The music for Lucidity is written and recorded by Danny Torgersen and Captain Squeegee. When asked about the music making process in an interview with Shawnnah Chaney from the ASU State Press, Torgersen is quoted, "Well, as we write the episode there’s often an indescribable cluster of melodies that begin to form in my brain. I call this part my brain recording...Typically if the musical ideas are any good I remember what it’s supposed to sound like and then desperately try to recreate it on my old crappy computer...After recording I actually work with John Knott, also our sound producer, who mixes and masters and does all those things I’ll never understand."

== Involvement in Lucid Dreaming Community ==
One of the main themes of the show is lucid dreaming and the real life questions that surround the subject. Creator Sean Oliver presented dream research regarding dream-to-dream communication via the internet at the 29th Annual International Association For The Study of Dreams Conference. In addition Lucidity has been featured in The Lucid Dream Exchange, as well as the "Get Lucid" podcast based out of the U.K. Gaining the attention of authors such as Robert Waggoner (wrote Lucid Dreaming: Gateway to the Inner Self) who responds to the fourth episode of Lucidity with, "For a zero-based-budget film company with volunteer cast and crew shooting, you guys deserve a lucid Emmy -- or LEmmy for Episode IV."

Creator Sean Oliver is quoted, "The dream is still a mystery. People live their lives thinking that we understand it, but the truth is we don’t, we ignore it. If we can’t accurately comprehend the dream state then perhaps some of our assumptions about normal consciousness are misguided as well. I think we should all explore that."
