= Art for Starters =

American indie rock band

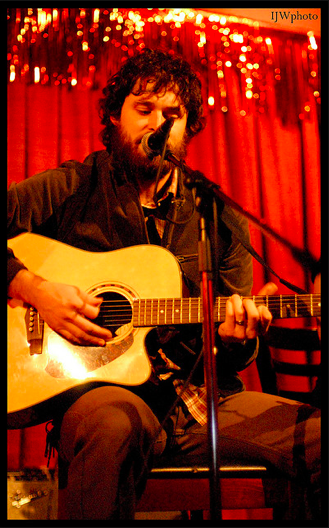
- David Jensen performing as Art for Starters on January 30, 2009 at the Ruby Room in downtown Phoenix.

Background information
- Origin: Mesa, Arizona
- Genres: Indie rock
- Years active: 2006 - present
- Label: Sunset Alliance
- Spinoff of: Before Braille
- Members: David Jensen; Spencer Reed; Chuckie Duff; Chad Martin; Bob Hoag
- Website: www.artforstarters.com

Art for Starters is a band from Mesa, Arizona. It is essentially former Before Braille frontman David Jensen's solo project.

== History ==
While still a member of Before Braille, David Jensen would constantly demo new songs for a project that he called Art for Starters. Some of those songs, such as Limb from Limb, Unfit, and Secret No. 7, would later be recorded with Before Braille. At one point, Jensen claims to have filled over fifty tapes with demos for this "project" that he never intended to pursue. Then in 2005, it appears that drug abuse led to Before Braille's demise.

Having been greatly trouble by the loss of his band, Jensen would spend many nights demoing new material on a cheap laptop to relieve the "stress and grime associated with the Before Braille" mess, while working as a night-watchman. It was while making these "bedroom recordings" that Jensen finally decided to go it alone. He had become tired of all the trouble that came with working in a band, and decided that he wanted to be solely responsible for his own musical future.

This led Jensen to record his first album as Art for Starters. The circumstances surrounding the recording itself are quite interesting. In late 2006, Jensen put together a band and recorded what would become his double-LP debut, Drugs Made My Favorite Bands, Drugs Ruined My Favorite People in two locations, Flying Blanket Studios and Bubbles Bounce Studios, after which mastering took place during an almost 28-hour marathon. Immediately thereafter, Jensen left the United States to teach English in South Korea.

When Jensen finally returned from Asia, it became time to release the album and to promote it with a tour. To do so, he had to recruit musicians who could replicate what he had done almost alone in the studio. After grouping together with musicians from many other local bands, including Chad Martin and Brad Cole from Fivespeed, David Marquez from the Sweetbleeders, Ree Boado from Lesser Heroes and Dearspeak, and then finally Ashley Taylor from Splitlips (who would later work again with David Jensen in Loyal Wife), a band was born.

Art for Starters finally released its first record, a double album titled Drugs Made my Favorite Bands, Drugs Ruined My Favorite People, by playing two separate shows, one to showcase the album's acoustic disc, and the other to showcase its rock disc. Both the record, as well as the live band, were immediately welcomed by the critics. Interest in Art for Starters would quickly grow and allow the live band to share the stage with national acts such as Taking Back Sunday and Dear and the Headlights

Unfortunately, just a few months later, the live band fizzled out and disappeared. According to reports, the acrimonious break-up occurred over a dispute over t-shirts. While it does not appear that Art for Starters will continue as a large group project, especially since David Jensen has gone on to start a new band called Loyal Wife, Jensen plans to continue releasing his own personal recordings under the Art for Starters moniker.

== Discography ==
=== Albums ===
Release date	Title	Label	Notes
2009	Drugs Made My Favorite Bands, Drugs Ruined My Favorite People	Sunset Alliance	A double-LP, this record features one disc that is strictly rock, while the other is strictly acoustic.
2011	Mark So Made	Sunset Alliance	This record, released only in digital format, is a collection of B-sides from the Drugs Made My Favorite Bands, Drugs Ruined My Favorite People double-LP.
2011	Without Voice	Sunset Alliance	Released only in digital format, this record contains all of the songs featured on the Drugs Made My Favorite Bands, Drugs Ruined My Favorite People double-LP, without vocals.
2011	Without Instrument	Sunset Alliance	Released only in digital format, this record features only the vocals from all of the songs featured on the Drugs Made My Favorite Bands, Drugs Ruined My Favorite People double-LP.

=== Compilations ===
- This is Flying Blanket, Vol. 1 (Common Wall Media, 2008)

Song: I Went to Church Instead

- The Shizz Presents...AM or PM, I Don't Know (Shizz Records, 2009)

Song: The Bone Stopped The Bullet

- Sunset Alliance Discography 2005-2011 (Sunset Alliance, 2011)

Various former releases

- You Heard Us Back When, Vol. 6 (Zia Records, 2012)

Song: Diction (The Beverly Hills Song)

== Band members ==
FEATURED ON RECORDINGS

- David Jensen - vocals, guitars
- Spencer Reed- bass
- Chuckie Duff - bass
- Chad Martin - drums
- Bob Hoag - drums, keys

LIVE BAND (2009)

- David Jensen - vocals, guitars
- Ashley Taylor - vocals
- Ree Boado - vocals, keys, synth
- Chad Martin - drums
- Brad Cole - guitar
- David Marquez - bass
- Spencer Reed - bass
- Rajiv Patel - guitar
- Loren Brinton - drums
