= Triplesplit Series, Vol. 1 =

Studio album by Before Braille, Fivespeed, Andherson
- Released: Dec. 1, 2000
- Recorded: Flying Blanket Recording, et al.
- Genre: Progressive Rock, Indie rock, Emo
- Length: 36:21
- Label: Sunset Alliance (SA 005)

Triplesplit Series, Vol. 1 was one of Sunset Alliance's first releases, and remains one of its best selling records. It features Andherson, Before Braille, and Fivespeed, each of whom would make an appearance on the popular Emo Diaries series on Deep Elm Records. This record comes at an interesting time for each of the bands, as Fivespeed had just opened for Jimmy Eat World at the release of Bleed American, Before Braille was preparing to enter the studio to start recording its full-length album, and Andherson had a "homecoming" of sorts in the Phoenix metro-area with this release, after having relocated to Berkeley, California.

Originally, as can be implied by its name, this was intended to be the first of a series of three-way split EPs. In fact, plans were laid for a "Volume 2," which was to be released with Fueled by Ramen records and carry the bands Before Braille, Seven Storey, and the Go Reflex (Bob Hoag's post Pollen band). However, the fact that Before Braille soon thereafter signed a contract with Aezra Records which prohibited them from contributing to any compilations, and that the lead-singer of Before Braille, David Jensen, is also the owner of Sunset Alliance, may have and led future editions of this project to be shelved.

== Track listing ==
No.	Title	Length
1.	"Blood Over Wine" (Fivespeed)	3:23
2.	"Kid" (Fivespeed)	2:36
3.	"Fallen Through" (Fivespeed)	2:26
4.	"Select Start" (Before Braille)	3:19
5.	"Red Tape" (Before Braille)	3:27
6.	"Low End of Luxury" (Before Braille)	4:37
7.	"Perennial" (Andherson)	6:17
8.	"Small Concession" (Andherson)	3:52
9.	"41st" (Andherson)	6:24
