= Before Braille =

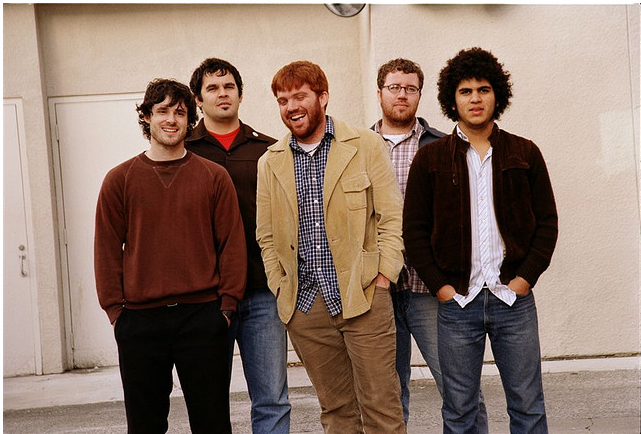
- Before Braille shortly after recording The Rumor

Background information
- Origin: Mesa, Arizona
- Genres: Math rock, indie rock, experimental rock, emo
- Years active: 1999–2006, 2010
- Labels: Sunset Alliance, You and Whose Army? Records, Aezra Records
- Website: www.beforebraille.com

Before Braille is an independent rock band from Mesa, Arizona known for its DIY work ethic and as a pioneer of Arizona's emo-core movement, or as they liked to call it, "480-area-core," during the early 2000s.

== History ==
Before Braille was originally formed in 1999 by former high-school buddies David Jensen and Hans Ringger. After each returned to their Arizona homeland after two years overseas, they met up to play music. Soon after that, they would recruit another high school friend, Brandon Smith, to join them on the bass. Eventually, the line-up was completed with Kelly Reed on drums, and Rajiv Patel on guitar (original guitarist Braden McCall left the band shortly before recording its debut full-length).

According to Jensen, the band's name comes from the idea of using guidelines to reach goals: "Everybody battles rules, but there are some that help you achieve. Braille is an example...with universal guidelines, a whole new world opened up." In the beginning, some of the guidelines that the band set for itself included: "(1) no guitar solos; (2) no drugs, alcohol, or cigarettes; (3) no individual songwriting credits; (4) no 'image'; and, (5) no patience for dishonesty."

Early on, they released songs on various compilations and started to garner some local attention. After reading about them in local publications, Aezra Records (an Arizona-based mid-major) contacted the band about making a record. According to the band, Aezra asked them to produce a ten-song demo in ten days, and if they liked it, they would pay to record Before Braille's first album. Even though the songs were far from polished, Aezra enjoyed the demo and made its formal offer. While Before Braille had originally planned to release its debut LP on Sunset Alliance, it decided to take advantage of Aezra's offer. In March 2002, Aezra released Before Braille's debut four-song EP, helping the band begin to attract serious attention and airplay.

In the fall of 2002, Aezra Records released Before Braille's debut full-length album, The Rumor, distributing it nationally through a distribution agreement with BMG Music. The Rumor continued to put Before Braille into both the local and national spotlight. For example, in 2003, the band was recognized by the Arizona Republic as Phoenix's best local band. Before Braille music also made it onto some of Phoenix's radio playlists with their song 24 minus 18.

National critics also heaped on the praise. For example, Stephen Carradini of independentclauses.com listed Before Braille as an up-and-comer in the "New Wave of Emo," stating that "Lyrical brilliance and dramatic delivery ensure Before Braille’s spot on this list." College Music Journal also praised Before Braille's sound, attesting that its "musical chops" would give the band lasting power after the rest of the emo movement had long past. The magazine's Jason Kundrath later stated that the band "brews its own unique blend of rock for the new millennium. Seething with salt, sweat, honey and asphalt (not unlike seasoned AZ contemporaries Jimmy Eat World), this foursome delivers a positively commanding performance that betrays its relatively recent appearance on the radar." All the praise appears to have been well earned. At its debut, Before Braille's The Rumor was the most added record on college radio. In addition, The Rumor made a significant run on CMJ's New Music Charts. In its second week, The Rumor hit number 28 on the CMJ Radio 200, and would continue to make a 9-week run on that chart.

All of this led Before Braille to share the stage with many national acts such as Jimmy Eat World, Piebald, The Anniversary, Cursive, The Used, Violent Femmes, and Fivespeed, and to play in major music festivals such as SXSW and The Vans Warped Tour.

While conflict with its record label would push Before Braille to leave Aezra Records and release its other albums on Sunset Alliance, a label owned and operated by Before Braille front-man Dave Jensen, this did not slow down or limit the band's success. Their follow-up EP, Cattle Punching on a Jack Rabbit, welcomed positive reviews and Get Out Magazine listed a song from that album, "Proventil", as one of the best songs to come from a Phoenix band. Cattle Punching's follow-up album, Tired of Not Being Away From Here, also received both local and national accolades. Responding to this record's release, The Arizona Republic recognized Before Braille as "The Best Band that Could Use a Break." Released with You and Whose Army Records as a UK Import, Tired of Not Being Away From Here also broke into the top 80 on the CMJ 100, even though it lacked the support and the money that helped to propel The Rumor.

=== Break-up ===
Although the group continued to release albums into 2005, things started to go sour soon thereafter. As it may be implied through the lyrics of former-frontman Dave Jensen's first post-Braille album Drugs Made My Favorite Bands, Drugs Ruined My Favorite People, as well as from some of his post-Braille interviews, debts, drugs, and infighting appear to have led to the band's demise. The following is the explanation that was given on the band's website on May 28, 2006:

Many people have been asking, but we haven't known how to respond. Here is out attempt to explain the state of Before Braille.... There were concerns w/in the band for sometime that finally came to the forefront. Opinions and methods on how to deal with those concerns varied quite differently. When we were unable to restore/maintain a working relationship, rather than end the band Dave volunteered to leave if the remaining members wanted to continue on. Ultimately, 3 of the 4 current members chose to take the name and look for a new singer and guitar player. (not including Rajiv in any of this, for he has been in Peru for 18 months) Unfortunately, the agreement that was made prior to Dave's exit is not working out. So, the band now consists of Dave who chooses to allow it to remain in the state of "indefinite hiatus." (To steal a term from ATDI.)

=== Post break-up ===
Since breaking up, Before Braille released two final albums, Kill the Messenger, Keep the Message, recorded prior to the break-up but never finished, and Spring Cleaning, a collection of new songs, rare songs, and re-recordings. Sunset Alliance also released two other stripped down "albums" of Before Braille music, one featuring only the vocals of the final two albums, while the other features the band without vocals.

Members of Before Braille have been involved in various projects since the band's demise. Dave Jensen has formed two post-Before Braille bands: Art for Starters and Loyal Wife. Art for Starters released two albums (Drugs Made My Favorite Bands, Drugs Ruined My Favorite People, and Mark So Made) and Loyal Wife released an album called Faux Light in April 2012. Rajiv Patel toured the country with Dear and the Headlights as a solo performer to promote his 2009 EP, Get Phased and also played bass for the band during that tour. Braden McCall has worked on various projects, including Alcohol(iday) and Deadwildlife, and has recorded and released multiple albums. Hans Ringger played bass in a band named Sharkspeed, releasing one album called Sea Sick Music in 2007, and currently plays with another band in Provo, Utah, called Regal Beast. Four other former-members of Before Braille combined with Jared Woosley of Fivespeed to form Red Means Red, and even demoed a few songs. That project never seems to have gotten off the ground.

In January 2010, former members Dave Jensen, Brandon Smith, Braden McCall, and Rajiv Patel were joined on the stage by Bob Hoag, who recorded and produced every Before Braille album, to play one last time at the Sunset Alliance 10-year Anniversary Show.

== Discography ==
=== Albums ===
Release date	Title	Label	Notes
2002	The Rumor	Aezra Records/Liquid 8/BMG/Sunset Alliance	Sunset Alliance eventually acquired full rights to this release
?	The Retaliation for What They Have Done to Us	Sunset Alliance	Instrumental secret project with no vocals to avoid detection from then-current record label
2004	Cattle Punching on a Jack Rabbit EP	Sunset Alliance	Pressing for this EP was limited.
2004	Balance and Timing EP	Sunset Alliance/ Bad News Bears Records	Released as a "Holiday EP"
2005	Tired of Not Being Away From Here	You and Whose Army? Records/ Common Wall Media/Sunset Alliance	UK Import
2009	Kill the Messenger, Keep the Message	Sunset Alliance	This album was recorded prior to the band's break-up, but not completed and released until almost three years after the break-up.
2009	Spring Cleaning	Sunset Alliance	This album was essentially a compilation of B-sides and rareties, but it also contained some new Before Braille songs.
2011	Instrumentals	Sunset Alliance	Digital only release featuring music from both 2009 albums without any vocals
2011	Vocals Only	Sunset Alliance	Digital only release featuring only the vocals from the music of both 2009 albums

=== Compilations ===
- Not One Light Red: A Modified Document (Sunset Alliance 2000)

Song: No Karate Chops (later re-recorded and re-released on The Rumor as The Jaws of Life)

- Triplesplit Series, Vol. 1: Fivespeed/Before Braille/Andherson (Sunset Alliance 2001)

Songs: Low end of Luxury; Select Start; Red Tape

- The Emo Diaries Chapter 7: Me Against the World (Deep Elm Records 2001)

Song: Venom By Memory

- Not One Light Red: A Desert Extended (Sunset Alliance 2002)

Song: Not Tonight, Not Ever (covering a song originally written and performed by Pinewood Derby)

- Americopa Mantle, Vol. 1 (Sunset Alliance 2003)

Songs: The Case is Out; Cause for Alarm

- Keepsake Compilation Vol. 1 (Keep Recordings 2004)

Song: Waiting on Dad & Muscle Relaxers

- Sunset Alliance Discography 1999-2001 (Sunset Alliance 2011)

Various former releases

- Sunset Alliance Discography 2002-2004 (Sunset Alliance 2011)

Various former releases

- Sunset Alliance Discography 2005-2011 (Sunset Alliance 2011)

Various former releases

== Band members ==
- David Jensen - vocals, guitar
- Hans Ringger - guitar
- Braden McCall - guitar
- Rajiv Patel - guitar
- Jordan Warner - guitar
- Brandon Buckmister - guitar
- Jason Corman (a.k.a. Mr. Fantastical) - guitar
- Brandon Smith - bass
- Ian Stupar - bass
- Tim Vanderwalker - bass
- Doug Fielding - bass
- Matt James - bass
- Dustin Carson - drums
- Kelly Reed - drums
- Brett Chairez - drums
- Bob Hoag - drums
