= Keep Moving (Novi Split album) =

Studio album by Novi Split
- Released: 2004
- Genres: Folk, indie pop, pop, lo-fi
- Length: 34:23
- Label: Sunset Alliance (ALLY 021)

Novi Split chronology
Keep Moving (2004)	Pink in the Sink (2007)

Keep Moving is the first studio album recorded by the indie-folk act Novi Split. It was released on January 1, 2003 by Sunset Alliance Records.

== Reception ==
Keep Moving attracted mostly favorable reviews.

Initially, many of the critics were drawn to the similarities between David J.'s Novi Split, and many other contemporary acts. Some compared him to Connor Oberst of Bright Eyes, while others felt that he was more similar in sound to Ben Gibbard of Death Cab for Cutie, Robert Pollard of Guided by Voices, or even Elliott Smith.

Perhaps the critics found so much in common between Novi Split and other acts that they loved because they tended to love Keep Moving. Grant Capes at Indieworkshop said exactly that when he declared: "David Jerkovitch instantly grabs you and continuously fingers you for the remainder of the record with its effortless pop and rock magic. You could draw all sorts of analogies to other more famous (?) indie bands, but would that really tell the whole story of this incredible album?" Indeed, according to Capes, "I guarantee that [later] you will be using David J. references to compare how amazing the new Dntel Service record is…"

Calling it a "disc that deserves a listen," Andrew Glynn at Leftoffthedial.com had difficulty picking any "particular songs to highlight, because the positive qualities are consistent across the album."

At Independentclauses.com, Stephen Carradini called Keep Moving "a spectacular acoustic album. It has the diversity that so many acoustic acts lack, and it gives us the first taste of some spectacular songwriters. . . . Elliott Smith is gone, but Novi Split has skillfully taken his place as the new 'great acoustic hope,' returning honesty, passion, and skillful songwriting to the acoustic guitar."

Finally, Matt Shimmer at Indieville.com also had high praises for Keep Moving, giving it an 85% score and describing the songwriting "as calm but deceptively intricate" while the lyrics remain "heartfelt and emotional."

However, as stated before, not everyone was a fan of this record. Andrew Steenberg of Exclaim.ca was among them. To him, "the good bits [of the record] get bogged down by such clichéd doggerel that even J. himself is forced to laugh (see 'The New Split' and 'I Had You')."

== Track listing ==
No.	Title	Length
1.	"300 Copies"	1:31
2.	"I Had You"	3:00
3.	"Not Now, Not Ever"	2:11
4.	"Glory! Glory!"	1:53
5.	"You Sleep, I Drive"	2:10
6.	"Me and Andy"	4:06
7.	"The 'Risks' Involved in Walking"	2:30
8.	"Ink"	1:18
9.	"Tonight! Tonight!"	2:46
10.	"This New Room"	1:09
11.	"The New Split"	3:22
12.	"Who's Going to Shoe Your Pretty Little Feet?"	1:34
13.	"Big Action"	2:28
14.	"Newborn Life Teething"	2:29
15.	"Niagara Falls"	1:56
