= Stereotyperider =

- Origin: Phoenix, Arizona
- Genres: post-hardcore, punk rock
- Years active: 1999–2009
- Labels: Suburban Home Records, Sunset Alliance

Stereotyperider is an American post-hardcore/punk band from Phoenix, Arizona, United States.

== History ==
Stereotyperider was formed in 1999 by former members of ManDingo and Adams Alcoholics. It was known as a pop-punk band that incorporated significant amounts of post-hardcore and indie influence into their music.

The band's name came from a friend in Mandingo. According to Mike Germinaro, in its earliest days, the band would always get trouble for "looking like dirty hippies and playing what was considered pop-punk." People were "riding the stereotype" that they had given the band, so the band decided to keep that as its name.

During its heyday, Stereotyperider could be found touring the United States with the likes of The Suicide Machines, Big Wig, Ensign, The (International) Noise Conspiracy, Nebula, and many others. Their success led them to become longest running act of Suburban Home Records, a respectable independent record label based in Denver, Colorado. In 2003, Stereotyperider won the award for Best Indie Group at the 2003 Arizona Ska Punk Awards Ceremony in Tempe, Arizona. They took home the same award three years later at the 2006 Arizona Ska Punk Awards.

After going through five different guitarists during their ten years of existence, and never earning the respect that they felt they deserved, the band decided that it was time to call it quits during the summer of 2009. Stereotyperider played its final show on June 27, 2009 at the Yucca Tap Room in Tempe, Arizona.

== Discography ==
=== Albums ===
| Release date | Title | Label |
|---|---|---|
| 1999 | Fair Weather Fan | Sunset Alliance |
| 2002 | Same Chords, Same Songs, Same Six Strings | Suburban Home Records |
| 2004 | Under the Influence, Vol. 1 | Suburban Home Records |
| 2004 | Prolonging the Inevitable | Suburban Home Records |
| 2009 | Songs in the Key of F and U | Suburban Home Records |

=== Compilations ===
- Sunset Alliance Discography 1999-2001 (Sunset Alliance 2011)

Songs: Destination ; Despised; Retro Active; Gone

== Past members ==
- Anthony Germinaro - bass
- Michael Upsahl- vocals
- David Aiona King - Drums
- Shane Addington - guitar
- Kelly Turner- guitar
- Kevin Bentz - guitar
- Luke Mathers - guitar
- Jay Collins - guitar
- Mikie Gaba - guitar
- Burke - guitar
