= Danny Torgersen =

American producer, trumpet player, multi-instrumentalist

- Origin: Phoenix, Arizona, U.S.
- Genres: Psychedelic; Reggae; Hip-Hop
- Years active: 2003–present
- Website: www.dan-et.com

Danny Torgersen is an American musician, vocalist, and trumpeter from Phoenix, Arizona, best known as the lead singer of the Phoenix-based progressive rock band Captain Squeegee.

Throughout his career, he has collaborated with a diverse array of artists and bands, including Grieves, Badfish, The Irie, Fayuca, Roger Clyne & The Peacemakers, and Authority Zero.

== Biography ==
Danny Torgersen was born and raised in Phoenix, Arizona, where he developed an early interest in music, particularly brass instruments. He began playing the trumpet in school and later pursued formal music studies at Arizona State University. During his formative years, Torgersen's eclectic musical tastes led him to explore various genres, including jazz, rock, and experimental music, which would later inform his diverse sound.

== Music career ==
=== Captain Squeegee ===
In 2002, Torgersen co-founded Captain Squeegee, a band that originated as a ska group but later evolved into a more experimental “space-jazz” ensemble blending progressive rock, jazz, and psychedelic influences. Their albums, To the Bardos! (2013) and Harmony Cure (2017), received critical acclaim within the Phoenix music scene and beyond, noted for their complex compositions and Torgersen’s distinctive trumpet melodies.

=== Dan E.T. ===
Dan E.T. is a solo project by Torgersen that builds upon his previous musical style, incorporating a broader range of genres and thematic concepts. His work frequently references topics such as aliens, conspiracy theories, and philosophy, while maintaining a fusion of rock, reggae, ska, and jazz.

Dan E.T.’s debut single, "RoundTrip," released in April 2023, featured rapper The Kaleidoscope Kid and showcased a reggae-inspired sound. This was followed by "Do You Right," a collaboration with frequent tour mate Grieves, a well-known underground hip-hop artist.

In 2025, Dan E.T. released "High Tide," a collaboration with Passafire, and "Eternity," featuring The Irie, further expanding his genre-blending style and reggae-infused sound.

=== Collaborations and touring ===
Throughout his career, Torgersen has been active both on tour and in the studio, collaborating with a wide range of artists across various genres. He has played trumpet for high-profile acts such as Cardi B, Weezer, Gondwana, Roger Clyne & The Peacemakers, Bumpin Uglies, and Authority Zero. He has also toured with Fidel Nadal (Argentina), Boom! Percussion, and AbbaFab.

Torgersen has opened for numerous notable bands and artists, including Animal Collective, CeeLo Green, George Clinton, The Mighty Mighty Bosstones, Ozomatli, Streetlight Manifesto, Watsky, Less Than Jake, and The Aquabats.

=== Other projects ===
Torgersen has composed and arranged music for film and television, including his own project, Lucidity: The Web Saga.

== Discography ==
Singles

- "RoundTrip" (2023) featuring The Kaleidoscope Kid
- "Do You Right" (2023) featuring Grieves
- "High Tide" (2025) with Passafire
- "Eternity" (2025) featuring The Irie
