= Cattle Punching on a Jack Rabbit =

EP by Before Braille
- Released: February 24, 2004
- Recorded: Flying Blanket Recording
- Genre: Indie rock, Experimental Rock, Post-Rock, Math Rock
- Length: 23:29
- Label: Sunset Alliance(ALLY 023)
- Producer: Bob Hoag, and Before Braille

Before Braille chronology
The Retaliation for What They Have Done to Us	Cattle Punching on a Jack Rabbit (2004)	Balance and Timing (2004)

Cattle Punching on a Jack Rabbit is Before Braille's third studio recording and was released as a limited release Extended Play in 2004 by Sunset Alliance Records.

All of Cattle Punching 's songs would later be re-released in 2005 by Sunset Alliance and You and Whose Army? Records as an imported full-length LP from the U.K., titled Tired of Not Being Away From Here.

== Reception ==
=== Critical reception ===
While Cattle Punching on a Jack Rabbit took a marked deviation from the pop sounds of Before Braille's initial release, The Rumor, it was generally well received.

The critics at Interpunk.com immediately noticed this difference, remarking that in "the past, people have tried to lump [ Before Braille ]into some sort of indie-pop rock category--maybe due to their success at CMJ & college radio--but this record is far edgier than anything they've done in the past." However, this "fresh and determined" new sound comes off as "an interesting, triumphant achievement."

Many other critics agreed. For example, Cattle Punching was received as a top pick in IMPACT press, where Craig Mazer would exclaim "Goddamn, this is good! A level of infectiousness like this is scarcely reached by other bands." The only complaint that he could leave was that the album had only 7 tracks. Matt Shimmer at indieville.com would state that "[a]s far as energetic math-rock goes, this is about as good as it gets." While Shimmer was not left completely satisfied, he concluded that Cattle Punching is a very satisfying EP. Stephen Carradini gave perhaps what could be one of the most glowing reviews at Independentclauses.com. According to Carradini, "Before Braille is the new school emo. Their passionate lyrics, blazing delivery, intense guitars, and murderous way with a hook will blow your mind. This is one of the best releases I have ever heard, independent or not."

=== Commercial reception ===
As a limited release, it is difficult to gauge the commercial success of this EP. However, when these same songs were released on Tired of Not Being Away From Here, they made at least a 5-week run on the CMJ 200 charts, peaking at number 77.

== Track listing ==
No.	Title	Length
1.	"New Vein"	0:56
2.	"Proventil"	3:27
3.	"Well as Well"	4:37
4.	"We're Not Paying for Anything Anymore"	2:43
5.	"Tired of Not Being Away From Here"	3:55
6.	"Fight or Flight"	3:33
7.	"Welcome Away"	4:15
