= Loyal Wife =

American indie rock band

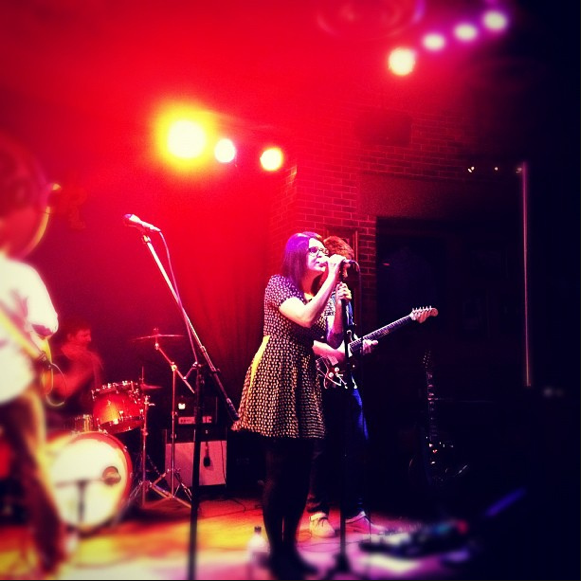
- Loyal Wife performing during its album release show in Phoenix, AZ in March 2012.

Background information
- Origin: Mesa, Arizona
- Genres: Indie rock, emo
- Years active: 2012 - present
- Labels: Sunset Alliance
- Members: David Jensen - vocals, guitar, keys Ashley Taylor - vocals Sam Hardwig - drums Spencer Reed - bass Blake Kimball - guitar
- Website: www.loyalwife.net

Loyal Wife is a band from Mesa, Arizona. It is former Before Braille frontman David Jensen's latest project.

== History ==
Band members David Jensen and Ashley Taylor originally crossed paths while Jensen was still in his band Before Braille. Their first collaboration would not occur, however, until after Before Braille's demise, when Jensen formed his first post-Before Braille project, Art for Starters. Having already recorded all of the material for his double LP, Drugs Made My Favorite Bands, Drugs Ruined My Favorite People, Jensen recruited Ashley Taylor to be part of his live band.

Even though Art for Starters eventually "fizzled out," Jensen and Taylor continued to keep in touch. Then, while attending a recording class at Mesa Community College, one of Jensen's classmates needed a band for a recording assignment. Jensen took that opportunity to demo a song called Ivory, in which he felt he could "hear" Taylor's voice singing. That recording went so well that he later booked time with Bob Hoag at Flying Blanket Studios to do more. To make the record, Jensen recruited former members of Awake and Alert, Sam Hardwig, Spencer Reed, and Blake Kimball. Yet, after discovering how much they loved their combined sound, they all decided to form a band.

Originally, Jensen had intended to call the band "Yell Aware." However, when a Facebook poll showed that only his wife liked the name, he suggested as an alternative, "Loyal Wife" as a sort of homage to his own. When Taylor decided she liked the name, it stuck.

To fund the recording of what would become their first album, Loyal Wife used the Kickstarter Project. In the end, this was a large success for the band as it raised a total of $7,534, or 152% of its original goal. The success of the Kickstarter allowed Loyal Wife to change its original goal of recording only an EP to recording a full-length LP which would be called Faux Light.

Initial reactions to Loyal Wife's first studio effort have been positive. Stephen Carradini at Independentclauses.com called Faux Light "an album of slowly-unfolding charms. After the immediate hit of 'Hold Up' and 'In Trouble,' the rest of the tunes here grew on me. It’s a definite progression, and one worth checking out. If you want passion in your rock and quiet tunes, Loyal Wife should be on your radar." In addition, Josh Macala at the review site Raised By Gypsies, was also enthusiastic about this debut, stating: "Really, this album takes you through such a fantastical journey that if you are not left wanting more after 'light off', then clearly you have no soul."

== Discography ==
=== Albums ===
Release date	Title	Label	Notes
2012	Faux Light	Sunset Alliance	
2018	Get Right	Sunset Alliance	Full record released as monthly singles

=== Compilations ===
- You Heard Us Back When, Vol. 6 (Zia Records, 2012)

Track: Cut the Rope

- You Heard Us Back When, Vol. 11 (Zia Records, 2017)

Track: This Is An Apology
