= Last Day Parade =

- Origin: Albuquerque, New Mexico
- Genres: Hardcore punk
- Years active: 1999–2001
- Labels: Kickstart Audio, Sunset Alliance
- Past members: Everett Bowler, Sanjay Chandran, Gabe Salinas, Ryan Medina, James Hall, Cory Palmer
- Website: https://www.instagram.com/last_day_parade

Last Day Parade was a hardcore rock band from Albuquerque, New Mexico.

The band released several recordings on Philadelphia's Kickstart Audio, distributed by Sunset Alliance Records. The group's music drew comparisons to At the Drive-In and Cap'n Jazz.

Since its break-up, some members of Last Day Parade formed the new band August Spies.

== Discography ==
Release date	Title	Label	Notes
2000	Sound In Motion	Morningside Projects	
2001	Driving at 90 MPH	Kickstart Audio, Sunset Alliance	
2001	Last Day Parade/Lauren Hospital Split	Kickstart Audio	Split 7-inch EP.
2002	Last Day Parade/The Commercials, et al. Five Way Split	Kickstart Audio; Chowda' Records	Split - CD
