= Reubens Accomplice =

American indie band

Reubens Accomplice is an American band from Phoenix, Arizona.

The group formed in 1994 at Thunderbird High School in Phoenix and released several 7" singles over the course of the 1990s, touring with DIY punk and emo acts such as Jimmy Eat World, Pedro the Lion, The Promise Ring, and Karate. The group's debut full-length, I Blame the Scenery was issued on Better Looking Records in 2001. Among the guests on the album are members of Calexico, Giant Sand, and Jimmy Eat World, as well as Neko Case. Their follow-up full-length, The Bull, the Balloon, and the Family, arrived in 2004.

In 2009, the group toured with Jimmy Eat World on the Clarity 10-year anniversary tour, having been the group's opening band on the original 1999 Clarity tour. Their newest album, Sons of Men, was released in 2012.

== Members ==
Current

- Jeff Bufano – guitar, vocals
- Ryan Kennedy – bass
- Chris Corak – guitar, vocals
- John O'Riley – drums

Former

- Andy Eames – bass
- Jim Knapp – drums

== Discography ==
=== Albums ===
- We Can Hold Our Own (Self released, 1994)
- I Blame the Scenery (Better Looking Records, 2001)
- The Bull, the Balloon, and the Family (Western Tread Recordings, 2004)
- Sons of Men (Arctic Rodeo Recordings, 2012)

=== Singles ===
- Red Handed Double Single (2 x 7" records) (Jerk Records, 1995)
- If There Were No Borders We'd Still Live In The Same State (Jerk Records, 1998)
- Sons of Men Single EP (2009)

=== Compilations ===
- Libations Unlimited: Phoenix '97–'99 (Sentry Press, 1999)

Song: "New Jam City"

- Not One Light Red: A Modified Document (Sunset Alliance, 2000)

Song: "Leave The City"

- Not One Light Red: A Desert Extended (Sunset Alliance, 2002)

Song: "Don't Forget the Promise"
