= Sunset Alliance Records =

Independent record label

- Founded: 1999
- Founder: Steve Lefever; David Jensen
- Genre: Rock
- Country of origin: U.S.
- Location: Mesa, Arizona
- Official website: sunsetalliance.com

Sunset Alliance Records is an independent record label based in Mesa, Arizona. It is owned and operated by David Jensen.

== History ==
After the release of a couple LPs featuring local rock bands, original owner and founder Steve Lefever had plans to let the label die. Then, in 2000, he approached the then-frontman of Before Braille, Dave Jensen, who had been working for two years to create a compilation album for the benefit of a local Phoenix art house and music venue, Modified Arts, and invited him to join in the management of Sunset Alliance and release that compilation on the label. While Dave Jensen's original plans had been to release that record on his own start-up label, Aireshire Drive, he jumped at the opportunity. In 2001, Dave Jensen took full ownership of the label and has managed it since.

After a decade of operations, Sunset Alliance remains a small enterprise that focuses on local artists. However, this has not kept the little label from attaining some significant national (and even international) success. During those first ten years, Sunset Alliance put out 46 releases, had three bands appear in the popular Emo Diaries series on Deep Elm Records, found its bands charting on the CMJ 200, sent its bands across the U.S. on concert and music festival tours, watched as some of its artists received international praise and released their records in foreign markets, and has even applauded as one of its groups moved on to a major label.

In January 2010, Sunset Alliance celebrated its ten-year anniversary with a revue show featuring some of its most successful bands, including: Before Braille, Fivespeed, The Player Piano, Novi Split, The Letterpress, and special guests Pinewood Derby.

Today, Sunset Alliance remains an active record label cooperating with different artists globally and focusing mainly on indie and alternative music. Although the majority of the latest releases are digital, the label keeps selling physical records and merch as well through their online shop.

== Bands ==
This list is compiled from information found on the Sunset Alliance website, as well as through the label's discography.

- Andherson
- Art for Starters
- Awake & Alert
- Before Braille
- The Bled
- Beninem
- Captain Baby
- Corrupt Citizen
- Felix
- 52nd Street Jazz Band
- Fivespeed
- Half Visconte
- Homeless Radio
- Icarus Phoenix
- Jeff Johnrey
- Last Day Parade
- The Letterpress
- Loyal Wife
- The Manhattan Project
- Mr. Fantastical
- The Necronauts
- Novi Split
- The Player Piano
- Rajiv Patel
- Redfield
- Roger Over & Out
- The Retaliation for What They Have Done to Us
- Signedso
- Shotstar
- Stereotyperider
- Tickertape Parade
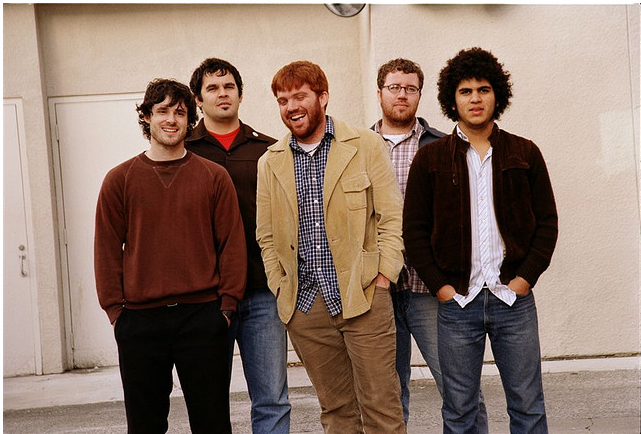
Before Braille

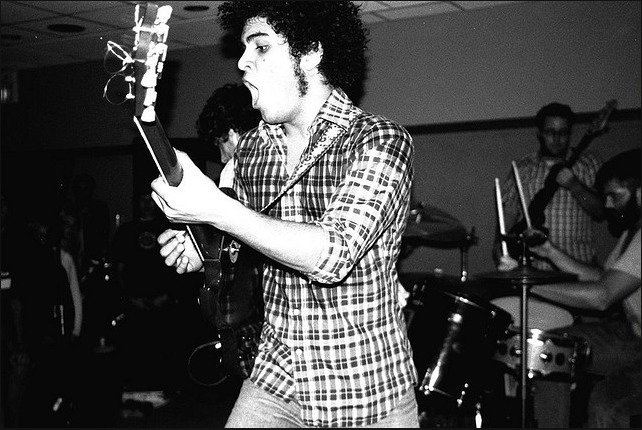
Rajiv Patel

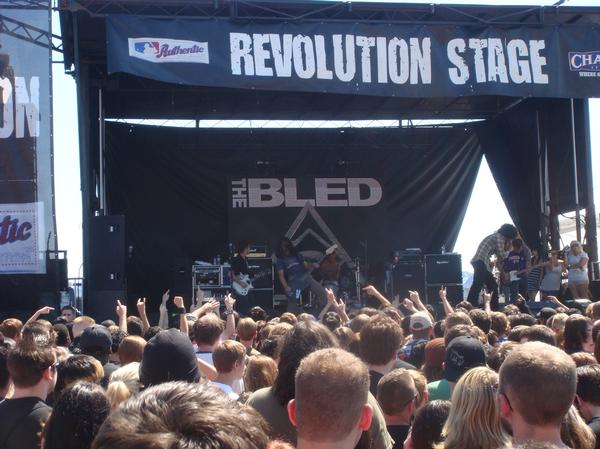
The Bled

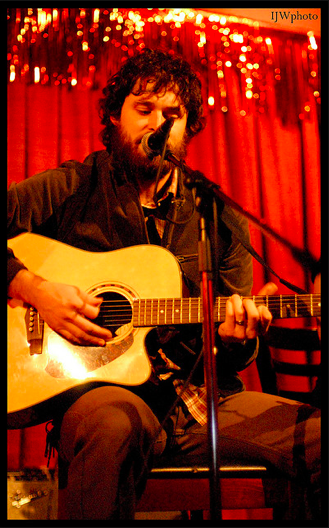
Art for Starters

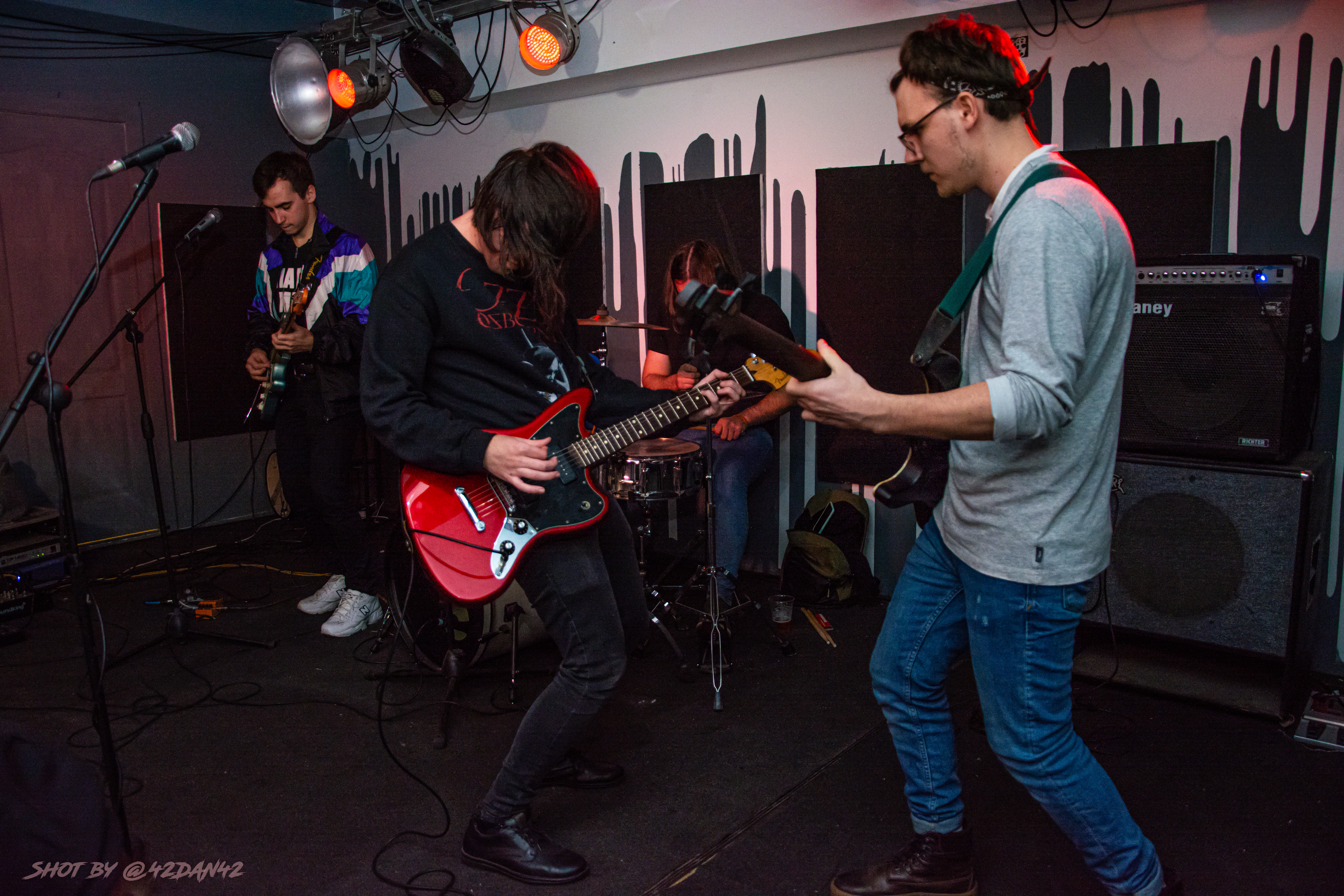
Homeless Radio

== Discography ==
| Release number | Title | Artist | Notes |
|---|---|---|---|
| SA 001 | Fair Weather Fan | Stereotyperider | |
| SA 002 | Uninvited | Corrupt Citizen | |
| SA 003 | Born to Rock | Redfield | |
| SA 004 | Self-titled EP | Fivespeed | Also known as the First of the Compact Cars EP |
| SA 005 | Triplesplit Series, Vol. 1 | Fivespeed, Before Braille, & Andherson | |
| SA 006 | Not One Light Red: A Modified Document | Various Artists | Released with This Argonaut Records for the benefit of Modified Arts. Bands featured on the compilation: Seven Storey, Fivespeed, Sea of Cortez, Harcuvar, Go Big Casino (Jim Adkins/Jimmy Eat World), Pinewood Derby, Redfield, Before Braille, Sextet, Pollen, ...And Guppies Eat Their Young, Scott Tennent, Reubens Accomplice, Fightshy, Death of Marat, Chula, Half Visconte. |
| SA 007 | Driving at 90mph | Last Day Parade | Released with Kickstart Audio |
| SA 008 | The Night was Sultry | The Manhattan Project | |
| ALLY009 | Trade in Your Halo | Fivespeed | |
| ALLY010 | Two Years of Silence Split EP | Felix & The Manhattan Project | |
| ALLY011 | Not One Light Red: A Desert Extended | by Various Artists | Bands featured on this release include: The Go Reflex, Cursive, Seven Storey, The Real Diego, Recover, Kristofer Astrom & Hidden Truck, Mock Orange, Bluetip, Fine China, The Format, Grey AM, Fivespeed, The Good Life, Fireside, Before Braille, J.Rawls, Bluebird, The Revolution Smile, Chris Mills, and Reubens Accomplice. |
| ALLY012 | Lost Sight | Redfield | |
| ALLY013 | His First Crush | The Bled | Released by Ride the Rocket Records. Sunset Alliance served as a distributive partner. |
| ALLY014 | Melodic Array of Change | The Necronauts | Released with High School Football Records. |
| ALLY015 | Self-titled | Signedso | |
| ALLY016 | Self-titled | The Player Piano | The original LP had a limited release of 1000, hand-numbered copies. |
| ALLY017 | What the Hell is Rock'n Roll | Shotstar | Released with Downfall Records |
| ALLY018 | Self-titled EP | Half Visconte | Released by This Argonaut Records. Sunset Alliance served as a distributive partner. |
| ALLY019 | Was it Fear | Half Visconte | |
| ALLY020 | You're Causing a Scene | Tickertape Parade | Originally, this release was listed as number ALLY020 in the Sunset Alliance catalog. However, for reasons that are not entirely clear, Tickertape Parade was "excommunicated" from the Sunset Alliance line-up and its catalog number was replaced by two other releases. The official Sunset Alliance website lacks any information concerning this recording or the band. |
| ALLY020A | Self-titled | The Retaliation for What They Have Done to Us | The Retaliation for What They Have Done to Us was a "secret" project started by members of Before Braille while they were still under contract with Aezra Records. They released this recording during that time, and it was later incorporated into the Sunset Alliance catalog. |
| ALLY020B | The Rumor | Before Braille | The Rumor was originally released on Aezra Records. Years later, Sunset Alliance purchased the rights to the album and thereafter has included it among its catalog of releases. |
| ALLY021 | Keep Moving | Novi Split | |
| ALLY022 | Obey the Cattle | Rajiv Patel | |
| ALLY023 | Cattle Punching on a Jack Rabbit EP | Before Braille | This EP had a limited release, and preceded the full-length album, Tired of Not Being Away From Here. |
| ALLY024 | Input/Output | The Letterpress | |
| ALLY025 | Americopa Mantle, Vol. 1 | Various Artists | This release was made for the benefit of local artists. It features: Before Braille, The Ruby Lee, The Go Reflex, Black Feet, Awake & Alert, Rajiv Patel, Sweet Bleeders, Not Quite Bernadette, and Wonderful Wednesday. |
| ALLY026 | Of Black Water | Rajiv Patel | |
| ALLY027 | Balance and Timing EP | Before Braille | Released with Bad News Bears Records. This was originally released as a "Holiday" EP. |
| ALLY028 | Tired of Not Being Away From Here | Before Braille | UK Import release with You and Whose Army? Records. Distributed in the U.S. by Sunset Alliance and Common Wall Media. |
| ALLY029 | Satellite | The Player Piano | The Japanese re-release of original Self-titled LP with Friend of Mine Records. This release carries two extra tracks: Jazz Odyssey and Cotton Carolinae. |
| ALLY030 | Drugs Made My Favorite Bands, Drugs Ruined My Favorite People | Art for Starters | Two-disc LP, one disc being purely rock, while the other contains only acoustic songs. |
| ALLY031 | Ham Hocks & Guitar Strings | Mr. Fantastical | |
| ALLY032 | Kill the Messenger, Keep the Message | Before Braille | |
| ALLY033 | Spring Cleaning | Before Braille | This album's full name is: Spring Cleaning...Cut, Clean, Scab, Scar, Rewind, Remind, Repeat. This record is essentially a compilation of B-sides and rareties, but it also contains some original Before Braille songs. |
| ALLY034 | Get Phased EP | Rajiv Patel | Released first as a tour EP. |
| ALLY035 | Step Up or Step Back (Single) | Beninem | Digital release only. |
| ALLY036 | Santa's Sleigh is Thumpin' (Single) | Beninem | Digital release only. |
| ALLY037 | One Liners (Single) | Beninem | Digital release only. |
| ALLY038 | Seconds Accumulate Dust | Roger Over & Out | Digital release only. |
| ALLY039 | Mark So Made | Art for Starters | Digital release only. This record features B-sides from the Drugs Made My Favorite Bands, Drugs Ruined My Favorite People Double-LP. |
| ALLY040 | Sunset Alliance Discography 1999-2001 | Various Artists | Digital release only. |
| ALLY041 | Sunset Alliance Discography 2002-2004 | Various Artists | Digital release only. |
| ALLY042 | Sunset Alliance Discography 2005-2011 | Various Artists | Digital release only. |
| ALLY043 | Without Voice | Art for Starters | Digital release only. |
| ALLY044 | Without Instrument | Art for Starters | Digital release only. |
| ALLY045 | Instrumentals | Before Braille | Digital release only. |
| ALLY046 | Vocals Only | Before Braille | Digital release only. |
| ALLY047 | Faux Light | Loyal Wife | |
| ALLY048 | Extended Stay | Jeff Johnrey | Digital release only. |
| ALLY049 | In Lieu of the Flu Sunset Alliance Mixtape, Vol. 1 | Various Artists | Digital release only available on Bandcamp. |
| ALLY050 | 52nd Street Revisited | 52nd Street Jazz Band | |
| ALLY051 | Keep Moving Disk 2 | Novi Split | B-Sides, rare tracks, and live recordings from Keep Moving-era; digital only release. |
| ALLY052 | Sugar Ox | Captain Baby | |
| ALLY053 | Born to Boogie, Born to Die | Mr. Fantastical | |
| ALLY054 | Sugar Ox Redux | Various Artists | A Bandcamp exclusive album released as a free download that contained remixed tracks from Captain Baby's debut, Sugar Ox. The artists contributing tracks were: D. Konopka (of OK Go), La Guerre, Grassfight, Octajohn, Hot Wheels, Reptoid, and Shunno). |
| ALLY055 | Faux Light Instrumentals | Loyal Wife | Digital only release of Loyal Wife's debut album without any vocals. |
| ALLY056 | Sugar Ox Instrumentals | Captain Baby | Digital only release of Captain Baby's debut album without any vocals. |
| ALLY057 | MJC Alpha | Captain Baby | Digital only release. |
| ALLY058 | We Notice Homes When They Break | Loyal Wife | Digital only release. |
| ALLY059 | Claim | Loyal Wife | Digital release containing original, alternative, and acoustic versions of the song. |
| ALLY060 | Old Friends | Loyal Wife | Digital only release. Get Right bonus track. |
| ALLY061 | This Is An Apology | Loyal Wife | Digital only release. |
| ALLY062 | Culprit | Loyal Wife | Digital only release. |
| ALLY063 | About This Town | Loyal Wife | Digital only release. |
| ALLY064 | Fast As I Can | Loyal Wife | Digital only release. |
| ALLY065 | Lowlight | Loyal Wife | Digital release containing original and alternative versions of the single. |
| ALLY066 | Black Serenade | Loyal Wife | Digital release containing original and alternative versions of the single. |
| ALLY067 | Hold Up | Loyal Wife | Digital release containing original and alternative versions of the single. |
| ALLY068 | Get Right (Instrumentals) | Loyal Wife | |
| ALLY069 | Get Right (Bandaged) | Loyal Wife | |
| ALLY070 | Get Right | Loyal Wife | Full record released as monthly singles. The release of the LP itself is expected in 2024 and it may have a short run of vinyl and CDs in limited quantity. |
| ALLY071 | Mormon Wheels (Pioneer Edit) | Loyal Wife | Digital only release. |
| ALLY072 | I & II | Umbrella | A retrospective LP of one of the key members of the indie-rock scene circa 1995–2005. |
| ALLY073 | The Bone Stopped The Bullet | Art For Starters | Digital release of the single from the Mark So Made LP. |
| ALLY074 | A Great Battle | Milo Jensen | The debut of single a 7-year-old composer and David Jensen's son Milo. |
| ALLY075 | No Tree Can Grow To Heaven Unless Its Roots Reach Down To Hell | Icarus Phoenix | The release is available both digitally and physically as a high-bias cassette tape. |
| ALLY076 | Knowhere (acoustic version) | Loyal Wife | Digital only release. |
| ALLY077 | Megatron (Freestyle) | J-Willz | Digital only release. |
| ALLY078 | Geek Hacker | Beninem | Digital only release. |
| ALLY079 | The Truth | Homeless Radio | The debut work from the Ukrainian indie-rock band. Digital only release. |
| ALLY080 | Dine Out | Beninem | Digital only release. |
| ALLY081 | Autistic Flow | Beninem | 11-track LP available both digitally and physically as a CD. |
| ALLY082 | Mine (Original Intent) | Retaliation | Digital only release. |
| ALLY083 | Just Ask Johnny | Beninem | Digital only release. |
| ALLY084 | A Great Battle (8-bit remix) | Milo Memes | Digital only release. A remix of the original battle soundtrack released back in the day. |
| ALLY085 | Brightest Days | Nochip | Digital only release. |
| ALLY086 | More Milk | Loyal Wife | Digital only release. |
| ALLY087 | Young Benny (Tribute to Benjamin Layne Shill) | J-Willz | Digital only release. |
| ALLY088 | 24 Minus 18 | Before Braille | Digital only release. A remastered version of the song from Before Braille's debut LP. |
| ALLY089 | Dysfunction/Victimization | Icarus Phoenix | Exclusive 'New Year' single available digitally. |
| ALLY090 | About You | Homeless Radio | Digital only release. Was released at the beginning of the Russian invasion of Ukraine. The contact with the band was lost for several months due to the tragic happenings in Ukraine, including Izyum. |
| ALLY091 | Lovers | Spencer L'Roy | Debut work of Spencer L'Roy. Digital only release. |
| ALLY092 | Spanish Dagger | Before Braille | Digital only release. A remastered version of the song from Before Braille's debut LP. |
| ALLY093 | Abra Cadaver | Before Braille | Digital only release. A remastered version of the song from Before Braille's debut LP. |
| ALLY094 | Saddle Up | Spencer L'Roy | Digital only release. |
| ALLY095 | 비밀 7 | Before Braille | Digital only release. |
| ALLY096 | 비밀 8 | Before Braille | Digital only release. |
| ALLY097 | 비밀 9 | Before Braille | Digital only release. |
| ALLY098 | Submarine | Homeless Radio | Digital only release. Tribute to the Joe Dunthorne's novel and Richard Ayoade's movie. The song received positive feedback from Dunthorne The Strokes producer Gordon Raphael. |
| ALLY099 | Not Misunderstanding Litotes (NML) | Icarus Phoenix | Digital only release. |
| ALLY100 | The Rumor (2022) | Before Braille | The remastered version of the Before Braille debut LP The Rumor, is available both digitally and physically as a vinyl. |
| ALLY101 | The Rumor (Instrumentals) | Before Braille | |
| ALLY102 | Covers | Before Braille (V/A) | |
| ALLY103 | Before Braille Covers | (V/A) Before Braille | A compilation covering Before Braille songs - primarily from the album The Rumor. The compilation consists predominantly of the Sunset Alliance roster artists. |
| ALLY104 | Supercar | Jesus Chrysler Supercar | |
| ALLY105 | Latterday Speedway | Jesus Chrysler Supercar | |
| ALLY106 | Landspeed | Jesus Chrysler Supercar | |
