= Input/Output (EP) =

EP by The Letterpress
- Released: 2003
- Recorded: Flying Blanket Recording
- Genres: Math rock, Indie rock, Emo
- Length: 24:54
- Label: Sunset Alliance (ALLY 024)
- Producer: Bob Hoag

Input/Output is an EP by the band The Letterpress that was released in 2003 by Sunset Alliance.

== Reception ==
While the critical reception for Input/Output was mixed, those who did not love The Letterpress's sound, praised its originality in creating complex melodies without any guitars, since the band features only two basses and a drum set.

Critics at Impact Press loved the record. According to them, the "[t]wo basses work together to create rhythmically beautiful melodies." allowing The Letterpress to feature "[g]reat musicianship with an original niche." Matt Shimmer at Indieville.com would also be a large proponent of the album, declaring that "this is a formidable effort from The Letterpress" which "should have no problem garnering interest from the math-rock and 'complex indie rock' communities," before giving the record a score of 85%.

Stephen Carradini at Independentclauses.com perhaps best expresses the opinion of those who did not absolutely love the record. While admitting "[t]he fact that The Letterpress can make music that would pass for smooth, hypnotic, guitar-based indie rock with only two basses is a spectacular achievement," Mr. Carradini contends that "[t]here is a point, though, where we have to distinguish novelty factor from actual musical ingenuity. While this is an extremely creative idea, and the music is good, 'Input/Output' sounds like a lot of other subdued indie rock. The members have expertly imitated electric guitars without actually playing electric guitars, but they imitated a little too well."

== Track listing ==
No.	Title	Length
1.	"Input/Output"	4:19
2.	"Autumn"	2:02
3.	"Ember"	2:48
4.	"Closer and Distant"	3:48
5.	"Launch Sequence"	4:15
6.	"Hanging in the Stars"	3:42
7.	"Falling Away"	4:00
