= J.D. Stooks =

American singer-songwriter

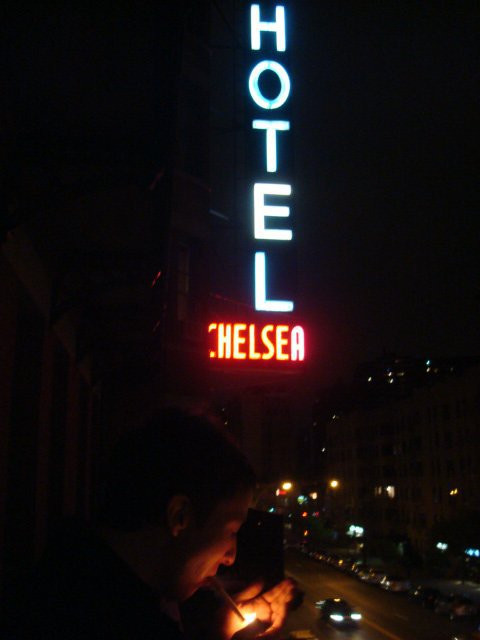
- Stooks at the Hotel Chelsea in 2011

Background information
- Origin: Phoenix, Arizona, United States
- Genres: Rock, alternative country, Indie rock
- Instrument(s): Vocals, guitar, piano, banjo
- Years active: 1996–present

J.D. Stooks is an American singer-songwriter from Phoenix, Arizona. He played guitar in Phoenix based punk rock band No Gimmick before setting out on a solo career in 2005.

== Career ==
=== No Gimmick ===
Stooks along with 3 High School friends formed the punk rock band No Gimmick in 1996. The band went on to win the "Best Punk Band" title at the 2003 Arizona Infusion of Music Awards. Stooks played on the band's first two releases One Wop, Two Micks and a Bean, and Loss for Words recorded in San Diego with Blink-182 collaborator Jeff Forrest. Stooks left the band after recording of the latter to pursue a solo career.

=== Solo work ===
In 2004 Stooks began recording This Evening's Ashtray with Bob Hoag at Flying Blanket Recording in Mesa, Arizona. The record was released in 2005 and was nominated for best singer-songwriter award at the 2005 Arizona Infusion of Music Awards. In 2007 Stooks released another Bob Hoag collaboration titled Women & Gold. The song Mary Mouer from the record was recorded in the upstairs dining room of Casey Moore's in Tempe, Arizona. The area is reportedly haunted by a former resident who was murdered in the room. In 2009 the single Maker's Mark was released. This was again produced by Bob Hoag and included the cover song Bad Love Anthem by Ben Trickey. In 2010 Stooks worked with Rob Kroehler of the band Ladylike and touring member of the band fun. This collaboration lead to Stooks' fourth release Shutterbug. Since 2010 Stooks has rarely performed live.

== Discography ==
This Evening's Ashtray (2005)

Women & Gold (2007)

Maker's Mark (2009)

Shutterbug (2010)
