= Seven Car Pileup =

7 Car Pileup
- Origin: Phoenix, Arizona, United States
- Genre: Indie rock
- Years active: 2007–2010
- Members: Mark Mason; Jess Pruitt; Mike Vigil
- Website: 7CarPileup.com

7 Car Pileup was a groove-based rock band from Tempe, Arizona. It has heavy roots in old-school funk and a small hint of jazz. The band consists of Mark Mason (vocals/guitar), Jess Pruitt (bass), and Mike Vigil (drums). Their name is taken from the TV show Scrubs.

== History ==
7 Car Pileup self-produced their debut album in a home studio in a house they all lived in. The self-titled album was released in late 2008.

The band recorded an EP with Music Producer Bob Hoag at Flying Blanket studios in Mesa Arizona in March 2009. The song Drive-In from their EP was the FM102x song of the day on June 23, 2009.

7 Car Pileup opened for Authority Zero at the 2009 ASU Polytechnic Home Coming, Cage the Elephant at the Marquee Theatre, and The Crash Kings.

== Discography ==
=== EPs ===
- Zombies With Dino (2009)

=== Albums ===
- 7 Car Pileup (2008)
