= Faux Light =

Studio album by Loyal Wife
- Released: April 3, 2012
- Recorded: Flying Blanket Recording
- Genre: Indie rock
- Length: 46:44
- Label: Sunset Alliance Records
- Producers: Bob Hoag and Loyal Wife

Faux Light is the first studio album recorded by the indie rock band Loyal Wife. It was released on April 3, 2012 by Sunset Alliance Records.

== Album information ==
Members of Loyal Wife that appear on this record are: David Jensen (Vocals, Guitar, Keys), Ashley Taylor (Vocals), Blake Kimball (Guitar), Spencer Reed (Bass), and Sam Hardwig (Drums). Matt Maloy made contributions on drums and Nat Theobald made contributions on bass for the song Ivory, and Jason Corman (a.k.a. Mr. Fantastical) played the guitar and the bass on GodSlight.

To fund the recording of what would become their first album, Loyal Wife used the Kickstarter Project. In the end, this was a large success for the band as it raised a total of $7,534, or 152% of its original goal. The success of the Kickstarter allowed Loyal Wife to change its original goal of recording only an EP to recording a full-length LP which would be called Faux Light.

== Reception ==
Reactions to Loyal Wife's first studio effort have been positive. Stephen Carradini at Independentclauses.com called Faux Light "an album of slowly-unfolding charms. After the immediate hit of 'Hold Up' and 'In Trouble,' the rest of the tunes here grew on me. It's a definite progression, and one worth checking out. If you want passion in your rock and quiet tunes, Loyal Wife should be on your radar." Josh Macala at the review site Raised By Gypsies, agreed, stating: "Really, this album takes you through such a fantastical journey that if you are not left wanting more after 'light off', then clearly you have no soul." In addition, Brad Fugate at Phoenixmusic.net called Faux Light "among the most commercially viable [music from the Phoenix area] that I've heard without compromising integrity."

On August 12, 2012, Jack Appleby at Absolutepunk.net included Faux Light among that week's staff recommendations.

== Track listing ==
No.	Title	Length
1.	"Ivory"	3:43
2.	"Not What You Want"	3:44
3.	"In Trouble"	5:04
4.	"Cut The Rope"	4:30
5.	"No Way"	3:30
6.	"Beautiful World"	4:09
7.	"GodSlight"	4:05
8.	"Hold Up"	2:57
9.	"Light On"	2:06
10.	"Light Off"	3:36
