= Was It Fear =

Was it Fear

Studio album by Half Visconte
- Released: 2002
- Recorded: Livinghead Studios
- Genre: emo, Indie rock
- Length: 62:30
- Label: Sunset Alliance (ALLY 019)
- Producer: Mike Hissong

Half Visconte chronology
Death of Marat/Half Visconte Split EP (2000)	Was it Fear (2002)

Was it Fear is the debut full-length album of indie rock band Half Visconte. It is also the band's final recording and was released almost two years after the band broke up.

== Reception ==
Professional ratings
Review scores
Source	Rating
Indieville	90%
Action Attack Helicopter	A

Was it Fear was widely praised by critics.

Jeff Petermen at Action Attack Helicopter Magazine gave the record an A, calling it "A wonderful delve into Indie rock." According to Petermen, this "disc . . . packed full of rock and roll and indie goodness" creates a disturbingly serene contrast between vocals that "are clean and haunting," "the scratchy fuzz of the guitars and bass," the soothing drums.

The critic at Adequacy.net would give reviews that are just as praiseworthy, calling Was it Fear "an absolutely stunning entry into the modern music underground." Praising the group's improvisation and musicianship, the critic found "The music [to be] sometimes jarring, sometimes soothing, and always challenging as it swings from angular to atmospheric with ease. It’s a testament to the skill of the band that these songs sound so complete and the improvised sections are so fluid and transcendent." He concluded by stating that "Half Visconte intentionally push themselves and their songs to go farther: beyond the fences, past the tiny orange surveying flags, and deeper into the looking glass. The stuff they brought back is phenomenal."

Matt Shimmer at Individual.com called Was It Fear? "an amazing record," describing this effort as "the emotional nature of emo, subtract the whining, [and] add[ing] excellent songwriting." . Giving Was it Fear a grade of 90%, Shimmer writes that "If Was It Fear? is any indication, HV could be heading towards legendary status - defying musical convention all the way to the indie rock hall of fame."

Finally, Hayden Blades at SLAM Magazine would describe the music from this "beautiful album" as "at one point, a cacophony of Punk splattered on a canvas, with hints of Progressive and sometimes even Americana." Then, "at another point, [Half Visconte] [draws] a visceral likeness to bands such as Godspeed You Black Emperor!, who expertly melt the serene with exponential builds of crescendos and powerful musical mantras."

== Track listing ==
No.	Title	Length
1.	"I Tried to Erase"	5:01
2.	"Racked and Martyred"	2:28
3.	"His Song"	1:31
4.	"Money Shot"	6:02
5.	"11"	8:26
6.	"I Wear Fast"	0:21
7.	"A Walking Tour of Trinidad, CO"	5:34
8.	"O The Lyin' Papa"	2:31
9.	"Name"	13:35
10.	"A Few Moments Before Sleeping and Waking"	17:01
