= Morning Over Midnight =

Studio album by Fivespeed
- Released: January 24, 2006
- Genre: Rock
- Length: 34:46
- Label: Virgin

Fivespeed chronology
Bella	Morning Over Midnight	The Way We War

Professional ratings
Review scores
Source	Rating
StarPulse	2/5 stars
CD Universe	4.3/5 stars
Contact Music	8/10 stars

Morning Over Midnight is an album from the Arizona rock band Fivespeed, released in January 2006.

== Track listing ==
No.	Title	Length
1.	"Fair Trade"	3:38
2.	"The Mess"	3:30
3.	"Morning Over Midnight"	3:52
4.	"Blame It On You"	3:33
5.	"Vegas"	3:05
6.	"Lights"	3:56
7.	"Touch of One"	4:10
8.	"Drive (Field Guide)"	3:30
9.	"Wait Forever"	3:50
10.	"Misery Loves Company"	3:42
