= Shotstar =

Former rock band from Arizona

- Origin: Tucson, Arizona
- Genres: Rock, Power Pop, Pop rock
- Years active: 2000 - 2003?
- Labels: Luna Records, Sunset Alliance, Downfall Records
- Members: Andrew Taillole, Tobin Watkinson, Eric Hoskin, Daniel Boutin

Shotstar was a rock band from Tucson, Arizona.

== History ==
Inspired by 60s classic rock as well as the power pop of the '70s and '90s, singer/guitarist Andrew Taillole and bassist/singer Tobin Watkinson began writing and recording songs together in 2000. The band would later add Drummer Daniel Boutin and guitarist/singer Eric Hoskin to complete its line-up. The band honed its "Beatles-meets-Costello-meets-Weezer sound" both locally and regionally before eventually signing a record deal with the Chicago-based label Downfall and a distribution agreement with the local imprint Sunset Alliance. In mid-2002, the band released their second EP, What the Hell Is Rock n' Roll?, and spent the rest of the year touring with acts like Superdrag and Ben Kweller and working on their first album.

== Discography ==
Release date	Title	Label	Notes
2001	Self-titled EP	Luna Records	Recorded at intervals between May 2001 and July 2001 at Luna Recording Studios, Prescott, AZ. (Except "A Boy Can Dream" Recorded September 2000) Mastered at SAE Mastering, Phoenix, AZ. Dustin Hanna appears courteously. Chris "Kung FU Grip" Ozuna appears courtesy of himself.
2002	What The Hell Is Rock N' Roll? EP	Downfall Records, Sunset Alliance	Recorded, produced, and engineered at Flying Blanket Studio by Bob Hoag, mastered by Jason Livermore at the Blasting Room.
