= Captain Squeegee =

American psychedelic indie rock band

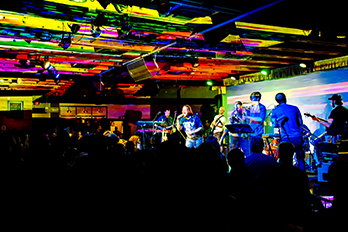
- Captain Squeegee performing at their 10th Anniversary Show at Crescent Ballroom on December 16th, 2016.

Background information
- Origin: Mesa, Arizona, United States
- Genres: Psychedelic, Progressive Rock, Jazz, Indie-Rock
- Years active: 2002–present
- Label: 80/20 Records
- Members: Danny Torgersen, Austen Mack, Ryan Sims, Matt Maloy, Chris Hoskins
- Past members: Kory McCarthy, Tyler Carlblom, Ryan Downey, Casey Rita, Joe Crawford, Danny Roose, Garet Ortego, Ben Jones, John Meier
- Website: CaptainSqueegee.com

Captain Squeegee is an American psychedelic indie-rock band from Mesa, Arizona. Formed in 2002. Their songs cover content from a wide range of topics, including: conspiracies, aliens, love, and the paranormal.

== Biography ==
Captain Squeegee is a seven-piece psychedelic indie-rock band formed in Mesa Arizona in 2002. Originally a ska band, they have no original members and now blend progressive rock, jazz, and theatrical music to create a sound that is experimental and complex, having been described as “...a musical-theorist/band-geeks dream”. The members are musically trained and read/chart music including their original material, and several of them have music degrees. The band has released three albums and an EP. They have toured the southwestern US several times and performed at SXSW, Warped Tour, and several other festivals in Arizona. Captain Squeegee has opened for acts such as Thank You Scientist, Parliament Funkadelic, Foxy Shazaam, The Mighty Mighty Bosstones, Widespread Panic, and Beck.

Danny Torgersen, lead singer of Captain Squeegee, is currently on tour with Badfish as their trumpet player, and also tours as the trumpet player for Arizona reggae rock band Fayuca.

== Discography ==
=== Albums ===
- To The Bardos! - 80/20 Records - 2013
- Nothing vs Everything - 2008
- Uprising - Mad Plaid Records - 2005

=== EPs ===
- Behind The Metal And Metric Pace - 2006

=== Soundtracks ===
- The band wrote and recorded the Original Soundtrack for the web series Lucidity, winning an award for Outstanding Composition at the 2012 LawebFest.

== Music videos ==
- Dually Noted - Directed by Freddie Paull. Satire on competition shows like "America's Got Talent" and "The Voice". #1 Music Video for 2016 in AZ Central.
- Seek - Directed by Matty Steinkamp. Sci-fi version of "Romeo and Juliet".
- The Farce 500-Million - Animation by Johnny McHone from Adult Swim's “Mr. Pickles” and "Robot Chicken" featuring various conspiracies.
- The Factory- Directed by Matty Steinkamp. Produced by Sundawg Media Production
- Inevitable - A claymation music video animated by Johnny McHone from Adult Swim;s Mr. Pickles. Released in December 2013.
- The Puzzle - Directed by Sean Oliver. Produced by Third Productions
- By The Light- Directed by Sean Oliver. Produced by Third Productions

== Collaborations ==
- Captain Squeegee with the ASU Concert Jazz Band - November 2012
- Captain Squeegee with MCC Big Band - May 2012
- Created original music for Valley Metro - 2010
- Collaborates with Third Productions. Creating music videos, short films, and web series.

== Personnel ==
Member	Contribution	Tenure
Danny Torgersen	Voice, Trumpet	2002–Present
Austen Mack	Keyboard, Guitar	2002–Present
Ryan Sims	Trombone, Synthesizer, Voice	2002–Present
Chris Hoskins	Woodwinds	2003–Present
Matt Maloy	Drums	2005–Present
