= Balance and Timing =

EP by Before Braille
- Released: February 24, 2004
- Recorded: Flying Blanket Recording
- Genre: Indie rock, Experimental Rock, Post-Rock, Math Rock
- Length: 22:10
- Label: Sunset Alliance(ALLY 027); Bad News Bears Records
- Producer: Bob Hoag, and Before Braille

Before Braille chronology
Cattle Punching on a Jack Rabbit EP (2004)	Balance and Timing (2004)	Tired of Not Being Away From Here (2005)

Balance and Timing is Before Braille's fourth studio recording, released as a "Holiday EP" in 2004 by Sunset Alliance and Bad News Bears Records.

== Reception ==
=== Critical reception ===
Stephen Carradini at independentclauses.com loved the record, exclaiming "I wish they would make more music like this, as it’s simply stunning." Chelsea Ide at the Phoenix New Times observed that through the Balance and Timing EP, Before Braille's "honesty and musical versatility" was able to "elicit a range of different emotions." Finally, the bloggers at Cougar Microbes called this release one of "a string of amazing releases" that "showcases frontman David Jensen‘s knack for a melody and sharp lyrical wit."

However, David Cobb at Splendidzine.com did not feel that the record met expectations. According to him, the "Balance and Timing EP is a reasonably good 'me too' to Jimmy Eat World's discography, but that's Before Braille's only substantial accomplishment so far."

=== Radio play and commercial success ===
Because of its "Christmas-themed" single, Merry Christmas, I'm Cheating, this little EP put Before Braille into the regular radio rotation in the Phoenix metro area during the holiday season.

In addition, some of the tracks included on this EP ultimately found themselves on Tired of Not Being Away From Here, which made at least a 5-week run on the CMJ 200 charts, peaking at number 77.

== Track listing ==
No.	Title	Length
1.	"Merry Christmas, I'm Cheating"	3:37
2.	"Help Is on the Way Now"	4:27
3.	"Limb from Limb"	2:53
4.	"Ex-mas Eve"	3:39
5.	"Fight or Flight"	3:41
6.	"Camera Disdain"	3:59
