= Tickertape Parade =

- Origin: Arizona
- Genres: Pop, indie rock, emo
- Years active: 2002-2006
- Labels: Sunset Alliance, Western Tread Recordings
- Past members: Topher Bradshaw; Dan Hargest; Sean McCall; Aaron Wendt; Jesse Everhart

Tickertape Parade was a band from Arizona that gained quick success on the indie scene.

== History ==
Tickertape Parade was formed in June 2002 after Aaron Wendt recorded a few demos, and then recruited his friend Jesse Everhart to play guitar. The band would thereafter be completed when Sean McCall joined on drums and Topher on bass and Dan Hargest, formerly of Pollen, would join to fill in gaps by playing keys, guitar, and singing backup vocals. By the beginning of 2003, Tickertape parade found itself playing to crowds of 500 or more, opening for acts such as The Ataris, Sugarcult, Jimmy Eat World, The Promise Ring, and touring with The Stereo and The Format.

In 2003, things were looking very positive for Tickertape Parade. That year, the band released an EP titled You're Causing a Scene, on Sunset Alliance which attracted positive reviews. At Adequacy.net, although the reviewer felt that the album lacked in originality, he stated "that these fellas appear to have grander ambitions than the average melodic rock or emo troupe," and that they were truly on the verge of something special. Matt Shimmer at Indieville.com also positively reviewed this record and expressly recommended it to emo lovers. By the end of the year, Tickertape Parade was named Phoenix's Best local band by The Phoenix New Times.

Tickertape Parade gained the addition of Scot McCracken with Lakeside Entertainment as management and Mike McCoy (Fallout Boy, Gym Class Heroes) from Serling Rooks Ferrera McCoy Law Group. Tickertape Parade showcased for a few major record labels, however, could not ink a deal. After 2003, the band released a self-titled LP, featuring Nate Ruess from The Format, on Jim Adkin's (of Jimmy Eat World) short-lived label, Western Tread Recordings. This, however, appears to be the last that anyone would hear from the band. In addition, the band has also been removed from the Sunset Alliance Catalog, as its original catalog number, ALLY020, has been replaced by two other Sunset Alliance releases, and the label's website makes no mention of the band.

== Discography ==
Release date	Title	Label	Notes
2003	You're Causing a Scene EP	Sunset Alliance	Although this was originally released as ALLY 020 in the Sunset Alliance catalog, it has since been removed and replaced by other Sunset Alliance releases.
2004	Self-Titled	Western Tread Recordings	
