= Obey the Cattle =

Obey the Cattle!

EP by Rajiv Patel
- Released: 2003
- Genre: Math rock, indie rock, folk
- Length: 24:41
- Label: Sunset Alliance (ALLY 022)

Rajiv Patel chronology
Obey the Cattle! (2003)	Of Black Water (2004)

Obey the Cattle! is the first solo-recording released by guitarist Rajiv Patel. This EP was released by Sunset Alliance in 2003.

== Album information ==
Unlike any of Patel's other solo records, this one features vocals on the track Horseride Out of the City. In addition, the hard-copy of the album itself lacks any technical information, including the song titles.

== Reception ==
The critics had high praise for this release, enjoying it musically and lauding its originality.

Noting its uniqueness, the critic at Beat the Indie Drum couldn't "really compare this to anything else [he'd] heard recently which speaks volumes for its creativity," and concluded that "we could all do well to immerse ourselves in the fluidic motion of Obey The Cattle!." Jesse Christopherson at Stinkweeds stated that the album "shimmers and knells and doesn’t sound much like any other popular music I can think of" in order to create a "rich potpourri of noises made by Patel’s various instruments and influenced by various cultures."

Although the critics were pleased with this offering, it appears that it took many of them a few spins to become accustomed to Rajiv Patel's solo work. For example, according to Stephen Carradini at Independentclauses.com, "If you take the time to get into it, you’ll REALLY like this." Before lavishing praise on the record, the critic at Beat the Indie Drum wrote that "when I first sampled the album on CDBaby I thought that perhaps 30 minutes of this would be off-putting but that is not the case after 4 solid listens." Perhaps stating it the most clearly at Indieville.com before giving the record an 87% grade, Matt Shimmer wrote: "Due to its uniqueness, this disc may end up confined to a relative minority of music fans, although those willing to give it a chance should be impressed - regardless of their current musical hang-ups. Getting used to the Middle Eastern scales and keys takes some mental adjustment; however, if you immerse yourself in Obey the Cattle, you could find an album better than most others you own, both technically and melodically."

Finally, Brian Baker at Rockpile summed it up when stating that "Patel's presentation is a bold creative statement for an album of such incredibly subtle artistry."

== Track listing ==
No.	Title	Length
1.	"Rattlesnake"	1:02
2.	"Ten Thousand Lakes"	3:22
3.	"Mountain Standard Time"	2:54
4.	"Curse of Laban"	3:04
5.	"Cactus Is My Brother"	3:46
6.	"The Wheat Looks Good this Year"	3:00
7.	"Morris Cool Saved Our Lives"	1:29
8.	"Horseride Out of the City"	2:21
9.	"Quilombo"	1:10
10.	"Mom Don't Worry Big Brother is Watching"	2:33
