= Fairy Bones =

American alternative rock band

- Origin: Phoenix, Arizona, U.S.
- Genres: Alternative; Pop rock
- Years active: 2012–2020, 2021–present
- Members: Chelsey Louise; Ben Foos; Daphne Greene; Matthew Foos
- Past members: Robert Ciuca

Fairy Bones is an American alternative rock band from Phoenix, Arizona, fronted by Chelsey Louise on lead vocals and rhythm guitar. In 2015, the band was named "Best Local Band" by Phoenix New Times. Their debut studio album, 0% Fun, was released on February 23, 2018. Fairy Bones has received coverage from publications including Alternative Press, NPR, The Arizona Republic, Impose, and Paste.

The band has also opened for artists such as L7, Highly Suspect, Doll Skin, Mother Mother, Kongos, Alien Ant Farm, Marcy Playground, Fuel, and Kyle Gass Band.

== Biography ==
=== 2013–2015: Formation and early releases ===
Fairy Bones was founded in 2013 in Phoenix, Arizona. They recorded The Fairy Bones EP with producer Bob Hoag in Mesa, Arizona, which was released in October 2013. In 2015, the band recorded and released their first full-length album, Dramabot, again with Hoag.

=== 2016–2020: 0% Fun and touring ===
In 2016, following a brief hiatus and an instrumentation change, Fairy Bones joined Highly Suspect as support on a series of west coast tour dates. That year, the band released two singles, "8 Ball" and "Pink Plastic Cups".

In 2017, they released their third single, "No One Can Suffer Like I Can".

On February 23, 2018, Fairy Bones independently released their debut studio album, 0% Fun. In June 2019, Alternative Press premiered the band's single "bullshit, ur a nice guy," alongside a vertical music video.

In 2020, the band briefly disbanded, before announcing their return in 2021 with a revised line-up, replacing guitarist Robert Ciuca with Daphne Greene.

In July 2023, Fairy Bones released their first single with the new line-up, "Wish I Wasn't This Way," as part of a vinyl compilation with Hookworm Records.

== Band Members ==
Current members

- Chelsey Louise – guitars, lead vocals (2012–present)
- Ben Foos – bass (2012–present)
- Daphne Greene – guitars (2021–present)
- Matthew Foos – drums (2012–present)

Past members

- Robert Ciuca – guitars (2012–2020)

== Discography ==
Albums

- 0% Fun (Worse) (2025)
- 0% Fun (2018)
- Dramabot (2015)

EPs

- The Fairy Bones EP (2013)

Singles

- "Wish I Wasn't This Way" (2023)
- "bullshit, ur a nice guy" (2019)
- "No One Can Suffer Like I Can" (2017)
- "Pink Plastic Cups" (2016)
- "8 Ball" (2016)
