= Half Visconte =

American indie rock band

- Origin: Phoenix, Arizona; Tempe, Arizona
- Genres: Indie rock
- Years active: 1998–2000
- Labels: This Argonaut Records, Sunset Alliance
- Past members: Scott Tennent; Ben Taylor; Rich Minardi; Dan Sylvester; Mike Wright

Half Visconte was an indie rock band from Tempe, Arizona, fronted by Scott Tennent and Rich Minardi. Tennent was owner and operator of the now-defunct label, This Argonaut Records, and the former manager of the Phoenix indie/art rock-music venue Modified Arts. At that time Mike Wright, original drummer, also owned The Argo which was a warehouse venue designed to support touring bands by the collection of donations and support of volunteer work offered by the local underground music community.

== History ==
In the late 1990s, singer/guitarist Scott Tennent ran the Phoenix art and music space, Modified Arts. There, he was known to sometimes step in and play solo sets to fill in empty slots during any given show. His musical gifts would also lead him to work with other local artists to create Half Visconte, which Hayden Blades at SLAM Magazine would call an "underrated band [that] was a unique addition to the shortage of truly alternative sounds in the industry in the late 90s and early 2000s."

During its short-lived existence, Half Visconte would release two records on Tennent's own This Argonaut Records before deciding to call it quits when members of the band decided to relocate to Chicago and New York, and the rest of the band did not wish to continue without them. When making their "break-up" announcement, the band also announced that they were finally going to release their debut LP when they were finished with their farewell tour. While this was certainly unorthodox, the band continued with its plan, touring through Texas, the Midwest, Chicago, the West Coast, and then finished with a final performance in Phoenix.

Upon finishing its tour in July 2000, Half Visconte holed itself up for three days in Phoenix's Livinghead Studios to produce its last, and quite possibly its best, recording: Was it Fear. Released on Sunset Alliance almost two years after the band's break-up, Adequacy.net would call the album "a wonder," Jeff Petermen at Action Attack Helicopters Magazine called it a disc "packed full of rock and roll and indie goodness," and before giving the album a score of 90%, Matt Shimmer at Indieville.com would simply state that "Was It Fear? is an amazing record."

== Discography ==
=== Albums ===
Release date	Title	Label	Notes
1999	Self-titled EP	This Argonaut Records, Sunset Alliance	Produced by Clay Holley and Mike Hissong at Living Head Studios.
2000	Death of Marat/Half Visconte Split	This Argonaut Records	Split 7-inch EP.
2002	Was It Fear	Sunset Alliance	Produced by Mike Hissong at Living Head Studios. This record was released "post-humously."

=== Compilations ===
- Not One Light Red: A Modified Document (Sunset Alliance, This Argonaut Records, 2000)

Song: Blue-Eyed Baldwin

- Sunset Alliance Discography, 2002-2004 (Sunset Alliance, 2011)

Various previously released songs
