= Novi Split =

- Origin: San Pedro, California, United States
- Genres: Indie pop, folk
- Years active: 2003–present
- Labels: Sunset Alliance, Hush Records
- Past members: David Jerkovich, et al.
- Website: www.novisplit.com

Novi Split is David Jerkovich's (a.k.a. "David J.") semi-solo indie pop/folk act. It is based in San Pedro, California.

== Story ==
By 2003, David J. started recording his own version of lo-fi indie folk-pop under the moniker "Novi Split." The following is his explanation behind the name:

Novi means 'new' and Split is a city on the Adriatic Coast. In America, when you have a large concentration of a certain people in one place you name the city after them. Little Italy, China town, Korea town, et cetera. There is a huge Croatian population in San Pedro [California]. One night my friend Mike B. wanted to lead an angry group of Croats down to City Hall to declare San Pedro [be renamed] Novi Split. End of story. It always stuck in my head.

In 2004, he released his first album, Keep Moving on Sunset Alliance Records. While, according to David J., he wrote and recorded each individual song in under an hour, that lo-fi record received quite positive reviews from critics.

After releasing Novi Split's first record, Kind of Like Spitting broke up. Consequently, David J. signed a new record deal with Hush Records to replace KOLS among its stable of bands, and to gain a wider distribution for his own music.

Since then, Novi Split has released one album, Pink in the Sink and one EP, Hollow Notes. Each of these records have received positive reviews and have even led to Novi Split's music being featured on the popular WB/CW television series One Tree Hill on two occasions. Episode 7.06, "Deep Ocean Vast Sea" featured the song Leaving It from Pink in the Sink, and episode 7.01, "4:30am (Apparently They Were Travelling Abroad)," featured the song Hollow Notes, which can be found on the DECA Compilation and well as the Hollow Notes EP.

== Discography ==
=== Albums ===
Release date	Title	Label	Notes
2003	Keep Moving	Sunset Alliance	
2004	The Sea Was Angry That Day My Friends split w/ The City on Film	Eat the Fly! / Cloak And Dagger	
2006	Pink in the Sink	Hush Records	
2010	Hollow Notes EP	Hush Records	Digital release only.
2013	Creeping Around Your Face EP	Self-Released	Digital release only.
2013	Spare Songs EP	Self-Released	Digital release only.
2013	Novi Split/Brown & Blue Split 7"	Self-Released	7" vinyl release
2013	Keep Moving Disk 2	Sunset Alliance	Digitally released outtakes and rareties from Keep Moving
2013	If Not This, Then What EP	Hush Records	Re-recordings of several older Novi Split songs

=== Compilations ===
- DECA: A Hush 10th Anniversary Compilation (Hush Records, 2008)

Song: Hollow Notes

- Sunset Alliance Discography 2002 - 2004 (Sunset Alliance, 2011)

Various previously released songs

- Mountain Main Records Presents: Friends and Family-A Benefit for Hunger Relief (Mountain Man Records, 2012)

Song: Creeping Around Your Face
