= The Player Piano =

American post-rock band

- Origin: Provo, Utah, United States
- Genres: Math rock, indie rock, post-rock, emo
- Years active: 2003–2004, 2010
- Labels: Sunset Alliance, Friend of Mine Records
- Past members: Kevin Mosher – Guitar; David Wathall – guitar Michael McCaleb – Bass, Occasional Voice; Jeremy Rice – Drums; Rob Bird – Keyboards

The Player Piano was a post-rock band from Provo, Utah in the United States.

== History ==
The members of the Player Piano met while still in college in Provo, Utah. There, they participated in the indie music scene and made their own contribution in a self-titled album that was released by Sunset Alliance Records in 2004. The first pressing was limited to only 1000 albums.

For example, in the United States, Anthem magazine wrote: "Who would have thought that five boys from Utah could compose a record such as this. I caught this band by accident recently and was impressed not only by their affinity for melody, but by their attention to detail. The songs on this album rise and fall in such a pleasant manner that when it comes to an end, all I want is more. It has remained in my cd player since I bought it and I don’t see it going anywhere soon. This may be a hard record to find, but it’s worth searching out. The quality of the artwork is enough to merit buying this album."

In Europe, French speakers would rave about the limited release. À découvrir absolument, a French webzine, not only loved the packaging, but felt that "once diving into this record, as in a pool of natural sea-water in Madeira, you really don't ever feel like leaving, even if that means you might drown." At Indiepoprock.fr, another French-language webzine, the reviewer finished another glowing review by stating "I don't know if there really is more to say other than to admit that this was truly a great pleasure to listen to."

All of the positive press did not keep the band from setting out to pursue other goals that they had in mind. Shortly after releasing their only recording in 2004, the band broke up to pursue graduate studies.

== Post-break-up ==
The band's break-up did not put an end to their influence on the world of music. In 2007, the original LP was given new life. In response to high demand, Friend of Mine Records re-issued the record, giving it new artwork, two additional songs (with Chris Purdie on drums), and a new title, Satellite.

In January 2010, members of The Player Piano gathered from New York, Oregon, California, Utah, and Honduras in order to celebrate the ten-year anniversary of Sunset Alliance Records. This reunion was their first show in more than six years.

== Discography ==
=== Albums ===
Release date	Title	Label	Notes
2004	Self-titled	Sunset Alliance	This was a hand-numbered release, limited to 1000 copies in its first pressing.
2007	Satellite	Friend of Mine Records (Japan), Sunset Alliance	This was a Japanese import, distributed in the United States by Sunset Alliance Records.

=== Compilations ===
- Sunset Alliance Discography 2005 – 2011 (Sunset Alliance 2011)

Various previously released tracks
