= Kinch (band) =

American indie pop band

- Origin: Phoenix, Arizona, United States
- Genre: Alternative rock
- Years active: 2001– Present
- Members: Andrew Junker; Jake Malone; Brian Coughlin; Pat Kane
- Past members: Bryan Witt; Alan Jollineau; Wayne Jones; Phil Hanna
- Website: KinchBand.com

Kinch is an indie pop band from Phoenix, Arizona. Their sound has been described as "an alt-rock pop style reminiscent of a few Brit bands, hearkening back to the sensibilities of '60s garage rock." The band's debut album, Advances, was honored as the Best Arizona Album of 2008 by the Phoenix New Times. Their pop sound has drawn comparisons to Coldplay and The Strokes, while others have likened them to Ben Folds, Rick Ross and Blur. The name 'Kinch' is a reference to the character Stephen Dedalus in the novel Ulysses by James Joyce.

== History ==
Kinch was formed when cousins Andrew Junker and Brian Coughlin began playing music with their childhood friend, Jake Malone, in high school and college. In April 2008, following in the footsteps of Nine Inch Nails and Radiohead, Kinch self-released their debut album, Advances, for free download. Advances was recorded at home with Kinch's frequent collaborator, Producer/Engineer Alex Pasco (French Kicks, The Little Ones, Ra Ra Riot). The album's sound has been described as a "Spector-ish Wall of Sound with great vocal melodies." Another reviewer writes, "each tune brims with Beatles-esque melodies, lush keyboard and guitar soundscapes and a deft touch for catchy song craft." Advances was honored as the Best Arizona Album of 2008 by the Phoenix New Times.

In the winter of 2009, Kinch released a 3-song EP entitled The Economic Chastisement. The EP was recorded over 2 days at a home studio in Austin, Texas. They followed up The Economic Chastisement with Collars and Sleeves, a 4-song EP released in the summer combining the band's two most prominent styles, guitar rock and piano rock.

Most recently, Kinch released their second full-length album – The Incandenza, named after the central family in David Foster Wallace's Infinite Jest – in October 2011.

== Live ==
Kinch has made official appearances at NoisePop, South By Southwest., CMJ Music Marathon., Summerfest, and Van's Warped Tour. as well as Arizona festivals, The Edge 103.9FM's annual EdgeFest and the McDowell Mountain Music Festival.

They've toured the United States with acts like Dear and the Headlights, All The Day Holiday, Local H, and most recently with Jimmy Eat World. In addition to opening for Local H, Kinch served as their backing band on their Six Angry Records tour in 2010.

Kinch has also shared the bill with Taking Back Sunday, Against Me!, Calexico, Ra Ra Riot, The Thermals, and Miniature Tigers.

== Discography ==
=== Studio albums ===
- "Advances" (Self Released, 2008)
- "The Incandenza" (October 2011)

=== EPs ===
- "Collars and Sleeves" (Self Released, 2009)
- "The Economic Chastisement" (Self Released, 2009)
- "Corinth" (Self Released, 2005)

=== Singles ===
- "Londontown" (Self Released, 2007)

=== Misc ===
- "Ziptape Volume I" (Self Released, 2010)
