= Life in Pictures =

Defunct post-hardcore and metalcore band

- Origin: Prescott, Arizona, United States
- Genres: Post-hardcore, Metalcore
- Years active: 2000–2006
- Labels: Limekiln Records, Clockwork Recordings

Life in Pictures was a post-hardcore and metalcore band from Prescott, Arizona that formed in 2000. The band released an EP titled Songs From the Sawmill in 2003 on Limekiln Records, and later a full-length record titled By the Sign of the Spyglass in 2005 on Clockwork Recordings. As of early 2006 the band has stated that they are inactive and the members are working on other projects. Guitarist Addison Matthew, bassist Pat Callaway, drummer Dustin Hanna and vocalist Hank Hampton are currently in Hour Of The Wolf.

Exclaim! noted in its review of the band's debut EP, "With Songs from the Sawmill, Life in Pictures are able to transform cynicism into a glimmer of hope when punk rock drum beats, harmonising guitars laced with heart-stopping chug interludes coalesce into songs no shorter than four-and-a-half minutes."

By The Sign of the Spyglass received a three and a half-star rating from Punknews.org. Blabbermouth.net gave the album 7.5 out 10.
