= Mr. Fantastical =

American rock musician

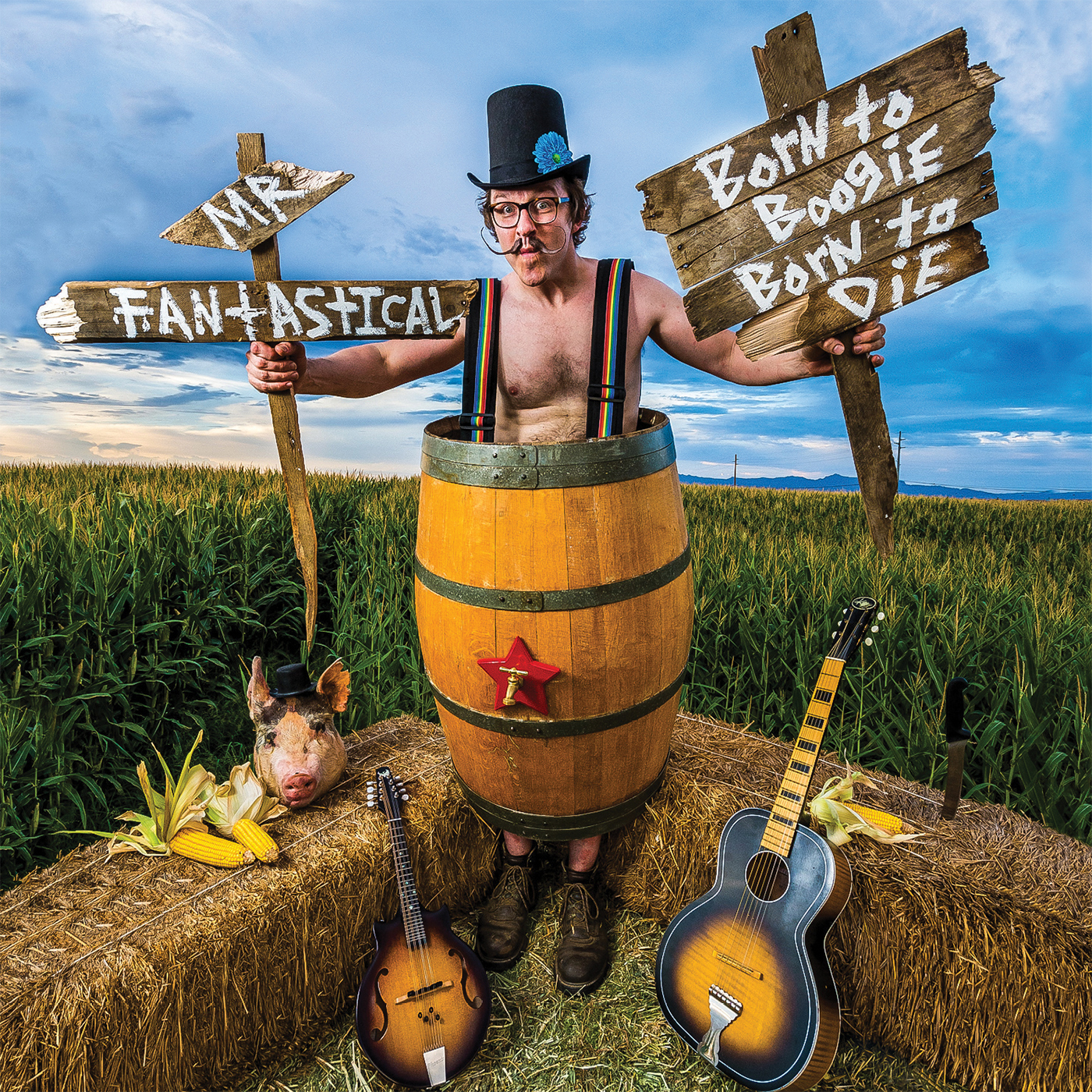
- Cover of LP "Born to Boogie, Born to Die"

Background information
- Origin: Mesa, Arizona
- Genres: Rock; Southern rock; dubstep; electronic; experimental; pop
- Label: Sunset Alliance
- Members: Jason Corman (a.k.a. Harvey B. Fantastical)
- Website: mrfantastical.com

Mr. Fantastical, (also known as Harvey B. Fantastical) is the alter-ego of Jason Corman, former guitar player for Arizona rock band Jesus Chrysler Supercar, butcher, and solo-artist.

== History ==
=== Jesus Chrysler Supercar ===
Jason Corman's (i.e., Mr. Fantastical's) first major foray into recording and releasing music came after joining Arizona-based band Jesus Chrysler Supercar. In 1994, after recently moving to Phoenix from Nebraska, Corman auditioned for a spot on JCS and ultimately joined the group that also included vocalist Mitch Steele, guitarist Jaime Hickerson, bassist Erick Smith, and drummer Matt Collins. Described then as a "David Koresh/Weird Al Yankovic look-alike", Corman's band would open for big-named groups such as Radiohead, Korn, the Goo Goo Dolls, and the Deftones. "[F]amous for performing in NASCAR jumpsuits and playing rock heavy on the testosterone," JCS ultimately disbanded at the end of 1999 after what vocalist Mitch Steele described as "having plenty of opportunities and running into too many stumbling blocks."

=== Mr. Fantastical ===
A few years following the demise of Jesus Chrysler Supercar, Corman started Mr. Fantastical where his production over the years has ranged from his largely instrumental debut, to his second effort, a "funny children's album "Ham Hocks and Guitar Strings" on the Sunset Alliance label that just stopped short of having a Parental Advisory sticker slapped on it."

By his third full-length, "Born to Boogie, Born to Die," one critic described his sound as "deftly combined rig rock (the first time anyone has said 'Put the hammer down' on a recording since CW McCall), a bit of glam rock (the tip of the Pilgrim hat to "Born to Boogie"-era T. Rex), some ZZ Top and James Gang, some Devo weirdness and a wicked sendup of rebel flag rock called "I Ain't Southern But I Play Southern Rock On The Radio." Weblog "Here Comes the Flood" actually named the record the seventh-best release of 2015 after declaring that the "record has its fair share of stomping good time music, but spin one of the smart instrumentals and be prepared to pick up your jaw from the floor."

=== Personal life ===
In 1995, Mr. Fantastical began his work as a butcher at his father-in-law's shop, The Pork Shop. In addition to being known around the Phoenix metro-area as a place for getting great pork products, it has also gained some notoriety due to Corman's handlebar mustache. According to Corman, he and his alter-ego, Mr. Fantastical, began wearing his trademark mustache in 1997. He relates that he had been growing the mustache to "stand out" in his band, Jesus Chrysler Supercar, and it had gotten rather long until 1997, when his wife complained about it. On the way to playing a gig, he made a promise to his wife that if his hometown team, the Nebraska Cornhuskers won the college football national championship, he would shave it off. However, that year, Nebraska finished first in only one of the polls, while the University of Michigan Wolverines finished first in the other. So, after his gig, he shaved off only the middle of his mustache to celebrate his team's "half-win" and has let the sides grow since.

== Discography ==
=== Jesus Chrysler Supercar Albums ===
Release date	Title	Label	Notes
1995	Hey Bailer	self-released	
1997	Latterday Speedway	Token Records	
1999	Land Speed	Token Records	Follow-up EP to Latterday Speedway

=== Mr. Fantastical Albums ===
Release date	Title	Label	Notes
2004	Inner-Dimensional Solo-Collaborative	self-released	
2008	Ham-hocks and Guitars Strings	Sunset Alliance	
2015	Born to Boogie, Born to Die	Sunset Alliance	

=== Compilations ===
Release date	Title	Label	Song Contribution
2013	In Lieu of the Flue	Sunset Alliance	"Canada, Canada" from his LP Ham-Hocks and Guitar Strings
2015	You Heard Us Back When, Volume 9	Zia Records	"Raccoon Stomp" from his LP Born to Boogie, Born to Die
