= Satellite (The Player Piano album) =

Studio album by The Player Piano
- Released: Dec. 4, 2007
- Genres: Math Rock, Indie rock, Post-Rock, Emo
- Length: 55:35
- Labels: Friend of Mine Records (Japan), Sunset Alliance (ALLY 029)

The Player Piano chronology
Self-Titled (2003)	Satellite (2007)

Satellite is the Japanese reissue of The Player Piano's self-titled album. It was released by Friend of Mine Records on December 4, 2007, and distributed in the United States by Sunset Alliance Records.

== History ==
Satellite was originally issued as a limited release, self-titled LP, released by Sunset Alliance Records. The first pressing was limited to 1000 CDs which came with a hand-numbered, dye-cut cardboard insert for the artwork. Shortly after releasing this LP in 2002, the band broke up in order to pursue graduate studies (among other things). This, however, did not hinder the album itself from receiving rave reviews all over the world. In response to this demand, the record was given a name, new artwork, two additional songs, and was reissued by Friend of Mine Records in Japan.

== Reception ==
Professional ratings
Review scores
Source	Rating
Punknews.org	4.5/5 stars
FakeJazz	10/12

Satellite and its original release were very well received all over the world.

In the United States, for example, Anthem Magazine wrote: "Who would have thought that five boys from Utah could compose a record such as this. I caught this band by accident recently and was impressed not only by their affinity for melody, but by their attention to detail. The songs on this album rise and fall in such a pleasant manner that when it comes to an end, all I want is more. It has remained in my cd player since I bought it and I don’t see it going anywhere soon. This may be a hard record to find, but it’s worth searching out. The quality of the artwork is enough to merit buying this album." Wade Chamberlain at FakeJazz, who gave the album a 10 out of 12, said "I'd seen the Player Piano live several times before hearing their self titled debut, and had been more than impressed with their live shows. I have to admit that I was skeptical that the CD could reproduce the beauty of their live performances. If you looked at my score at the top of the review you'd know that it has. This is a beautiful album." And Jeff Marsh at Delusions of Adequacy summarizeed his review by calling it "a stellar debut."

In Europe, French speakers raved about the album. À découvrir absolument, a French webzine, not only loved the packaging, but felt that "once diving into this record, as in a pool of natural sea-water in Madeira, you really don't ever feel like leaving, even if that means you might drown." At Indiepoprock.fr, another French-language webzine, the reviewer finished another glowing review by stating "I don't know if there really is more to say other than to admit that this was truly a great pleasure to listen to." Finally, Didier Goudeseune at Derives would continue the praise, stating that "With tears of joy, The Player Piano will not leave my bedside for the rest of the year!" Even today, Goudeseune continues to reference The Player Piano in referring to bands like The Climates or Mountains for Clouds

Even years after its original release, this record continued to garner attention. Referring specifically to the Japanese re-issue, reviewer "Nightowl" at Punknews.org, felt that "[t]hese five boys from Utah created some of the most capable music rivaling American Football or Boys Life, even to this day.Although mostly instrumental, some of my favorite tracks are the ones with sporadic vocals near the middle or end of the songs, summoning up even more emotion than called for with their twinkling guitar back-and-forths." He also noted that "[e]ven though this band is not currently active, just knowing that this existed and someone in Japan still likes it enough to re-press it makes me giddy as a school girl." Keith Latinen of Empire! Empire! (I Was a Lonely Estate) and Count Your Lucky Stars Records also loved the record. In his words, "I love everything about this band- it was a pretty much a no-brainer for me. It featured clean super guitars that wove heart-breaking, beautiful melodies, and a really inventive rhythm section that always found a way to keep your attention." In the end, his "only complaint was they didn't sing enough. Also that this was their only release."

The original self-titled released by The Player Piano.

== Track listing ==
No.	Title	Length
1.	"Scanning Faces"	4:10
2.	"Sudden Left"	6:26
3.	"Pi/4"	6:24
4.	"Quiet"	2:23
5.	"Milwaukee Mile"	3:44
6.	"Mayday"	5:02
7.	"Money Talks"	3:49
8.	"NJB"	4:52
9.	"After the Fact"	6:08
10.	"Jazz Odyssey (bonus track)"	7:29
11.	"Cottus Carolinae (bonus track)"	5:08
