= Third Productions =

American media production company

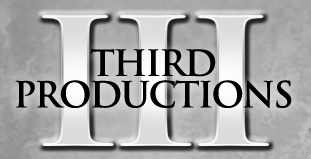
- Type: Independent
- Industry: Art
- Founded: 2009
- Headquarters: World Wide Web
- Products: Web series Short Films; Music Videos; Live concerts Clothing
- Website: Third Productions Official Website

Third Productions is an independent production house with an emphasis on creating progressive media. Third creates music videos, web series, and hosts live events.

== Web series ==
=== Lucidity ===
Lucidity: The Web Saga is a metaphysical comedy web series produced by Third Productions. The program was created and written by Sean Oliver and Danny Torgersen, who co-star as George (Torgersen) and Jason (Oliver). The series begins with two roommates, George and Jason, who for reasons unknown to them share each other's dreams. The two have no control over their dreams and as the astral world increasingly encroaches on their real lives they decide to take action. This decision sends the roommates on an out-of-body adventure that neither were prepared for.

Lucidity was screened at the LAWeb Fest 2011, 2012, and 2013. Winning awards in Editing, Directing, Music Composition, and Special Effects. The saga was also an official selection at Phoenix Comicon 2013.

=== Diamond Hunter ===
Diamond Hunter is a 7 episode docu-series about three friends (Nick Montefour, Peter Mikelis, and Hendrik Chasse) risking everything they have trying to strike it rich mining diamonds in Africa.

Diamond Hunter was an Official Selection at LAWeb Fest 2013. Winning multiple awards: Outstanding Series, Editing, and Writing.

=== But Vessels ===
But Vessels is self described as, "a semi-satirical trans-temporal, cross dimensional, vibratory complex that expresses itself as a Rock Band." Forming in 2012 the comedy band has released several music videos and is currently recording their first EP.

== Music videos ==
=== Captain Squeegee ===
- "The Puzzle" - 2009
- "The Post It-Plan And Execution" - 2009
- "By The Light" - 2009

=== Black Carl ===
- "The Wolf" - Premiered at the Marquee Theater in Tempe, Arizona at The 2010: Future Phoenix show.

=== Marie Fleur ===
- "Caravan" - 2011

=== Chad Krystals ===
- "Whole Lotta Thug" ft. Alchemist - 2012
- "Superfly (West Fresh)" - 2011
