= Bob Hoag =

Record producer, songwriter and musician

- Occupations: Record producer, Songwriter, Musician
- Known for: Pianist and keyboardist for The Ataris

Bob Hoag is an American record producer, songwriter and musician based in Mesa, Arizona. In 2005, he was recruited to be the pianist and keyboardist for American rock band The Ataris.

== Career ==
Hoag wrote songs for his group, The Go Reflex, as well as his previous group, Pollen. His main band, The Go Reflex, includes Kevin Scanlon from the now defunct band, Pollen (Hoag played the drums and wrote the songs). In The Go Reflex, Hoag once again writes the songs but also sings and plays piano as well as drums. He also played drums and recorded records for the power-pop/garage group The Breakup Society, as well as The Love Me Nots. He currently runs Flying Blanket Recording in Mesa, Arizona where he has produced and recorded many musicians who have led successful careers.

Hoag generally contributes musically to most of the records he produces as well and can be heard singing, playing piano/keyboards, and doing various percussion on most of those releases. The Go Reflex has not been active since Kevin Scanlon moved to Los Angeles to pursue a career in photography in 2004. There were two shows in late 2004, featuring a heavily expanded line-up but the group would not play again until the summer of 2006 (a benefit show), which was done with the band's original line-up. There was also a show in summer 2007 with a heavily expanded and different line-up but still featuring Scanlon on guitar. Hoag has cited his busy recording schedule as the main reason behind the group's recent inactivity and continuously claims that the band will one day become active again.

He is married and has two children.

== Musicians recorded or produced by Hoag ==
- Adam Panic
- Alaska & Me
- Almost Always
- Art for Starters
- Asia Blonde
- The Ataris
- Austin Gibbs
- Awake and Alert
- Back Ted N-Ted
- Bad Lucy
- Banana Gun
- Bears of Manitou
- Before Braille
- Bella
- Birds of India
- Black Box Burning
- Black Carl
- The Bled
- Bogan Via
- The Breakup Society
- Andrew Duncan Brown
- Calabrese (band)
- Captain Squeegee
- Chrome Rhino
- Citizen Media
- Courtney Marie Andrews
- Dear and the Headlights
- Don't Miss the Big
- Dorsey
- The Fair and Debonair
- Fairy Bones
- Felix
- Fifteen Minutes Fast
- Fine China
- Fivespeed
- The Format
- Future Loves Past
- Girl Repellent
- Gin Blossoms
- Glitter Dick
- Gospel Claws
- Haffo
- Harper and the Moths
- Heist At Hand
- Hot House Orchids
- Hour of the Wolf
- Hunter Johnson
- iamwe
- The Impossibles
- Jared & The Mill
- J.D. Stooks
- Joel Plaskett
- Juicy Newt
- Kinch
- Kiras Rage
- Thomas Knight
- The Letterpress
- Life in Pictures
- Life In Stereo
- Limbeck
- love, PALMS
- The Loveblisters
- Loyal Wife
- Mergence
- Mr. Kline and the Wizards of Time
- Neba
- O'Henry
- Pollen
- This Past Year (later known as The Format)
- Recover
- The Psychedelephants
- The Retaliation for What They Have Done to Us
- Scary Kids Scaring Kids
- Seven Car Pileup
- Sharkspeed
- Shotstar
- Sister Cities
- Snake! Snake! Snakes!
- Sugar High
- TOAD (Take Over and Destroy)
- Tickertape Parade
- Tugboat
- Undeclared
- Until August
- Velveteen Dream
- Vincent Liou
- What Laura Says
- XrayOK
