= The Rumor (album) =

Studio album by Before Braille
- Released: September 10, 2002
- Recorded: Flying Blanket Recording
- Genres: Progressive rock, Indie rock, Emo
- Length: 64:08
- Labels: Liquid 8/Aezra Records; Sunset Alliance(ALLY 020B)
- Producers: Bob Hoag and Before Braille

Before Braille chronology
The Rumor	The Retaliation for What They Have Done to Us (?)

The Rumor is the first studio album recorded by indie rock band Before Braille. It was originally released on September 10, 2002 by Aezra Records and distributed by BMG. Ownership of the album has since passed to Sunset Alliance Records.

== Story ==
Because Aezra Records had placed the band under significant pressure to get this record done quickly, the album was recorded and produced by Bob Hoag at Flying Blanket Recording in Mesa, Arizona, in one and one half months and then mixed by Bob and the band during a 28-hour marathon session. However, when the original mixes were given to Aezra Records, the label rejected them. Bob Hoag offered to remix any of the material, but the label refused and decided that it wanted to hire Karl Richardson of Saturday Night Fever-era Beegees fame, in Miami. The new mixes from Miami did not please anyone either. Eventually, when it came time to master the record, it was sent to Jason Livermore, one of Bob Hoag's close acquaintances, at the Blasting Room in Fort Collins, Colorado. Bob was enlisted to help in the mastering, and perhaps fix all of the problems with the mixes. Jason Livermore ended up liking the original mixes more than those done in Florida, and eventually included all of them on the new master copy, which, although it was rejected by the label just four months earlier, ended up getting the go ahead when compared to the Miami mixes.

The band originally wanted to record an album with twenty songs. Aezra only wanted ten songs to be on the record, so the band met them halfway and included 15 tracks on the album.

As for the album's name, the band had originally thought of "Trade Honor for Canker Sores," "The Sunset Alliance," and "Tired of Not Being Away From Here." Eventually, it settled on The Rumor after the following experience as recounted by lead-singer Dave Jensen:

"Without mentioning any names, there was a very heated conversation between a member of the band and 2 people representing the label. Threats were made by the two people from the label after the band had decided not to work with a particular member of 'A&R'. Almost a direct quote from that encounter was this, 'I will personally see to it that this is the end of your band...if you continue ignoring me, this will all be over and your record will never be released...Before Braille will be a rumor....'"

== Album Information ==
Members of the band that contributed to this recording include: David Jensen, Hans Ringger, Brandon Smith, and Kelly Reed. Braden McCall also participated in the recording of this album, but left the band before it was mixed and mastered. In addition, Jared Woosley of Fivespeed, Dan Hargest of Pollen, Alex Eilers, and McKane Davis, contributed to the vocals.

This enhanced CD also carries an EPK (Electronic Press Kit) filmed and produced by Fabio Jafet. Among other things, the EPK features interviews, live performances, and some behind the scenes "horsing around."

== Reception ==
=== Critical reception ===
Professional ratings
Review scores
Source	Rating
Allmusic	3/5 stars
The Phill(er)	B
CMJ	(favorable)
Sputnikmusic.com	4.5/5 stars
The Daily Herald	(favorable)

The Rumor received favorable reviews from professional critics.

While this album gained many comparisons to Jimmy Eat World, a contemporary critical success that also hailed from Mesa, Arizona, Jeff Marsh of Adequacy.net contends that "Before Braille has their own sound" and calls The Rumor "a pretty impressive debut." Jenn Sikes at Splendidzine.com found that "Before Braille gives listeners a lot to love." While not totally engaged in the emo movement of the early 2000s, Sikes found that The Rumor "has combined the most desirable and enduring features from a variety of emo bands, creating a sort of 'optimized' aesthetic. It works, too--just when I'd decided that I could no longer be tickled by emo, Before Braille proved me wrong." Eric Snider at the Daily Herald also had praise for this debut, saying that it "is brimming with melodic, fully developed emo/indie sound. It is mainstream and catchy without being trendy, and deep but not pretentious." Finally, Brad Filick at CMJ New Music Weekly found that The Rumor has staying power. He described the record as having "heartbreaking lyrics delivered passionately over syncopated, but poppy guitar crunch that has come to define the term 'emo.'" He continued, however, to note that even "if emo goes out of style, Before Braille will likely still be rocking shows long after most of the Chris Carraba wannabes have left the building."

This record would also garner some accolades for the band. In 2003, the Association for Independent Music nominated Before Braille for an Indie Award in the Alternative Rock category for its work on The Rumor. In addition, at the end of 2009, the editor of Music Snobs Anonymous listed The Rumor as one of the 100 best albums of the 2000s.

=== Commercial performance ===
The Rumor made a very strong debut as an independent release. In its first week, it was the most added record on college radio. The record also made a significant run on CMJ's New Music Charts. In its second week, The Rumor hit number 28 on the CMJ Radio 200, and would continue to make a 9-week run on that chart.

== Track listing ==
No.	Title	Length
1.	"Prelude: Secret No. 7"	4:33
2.	"The Spanish Dagger"	4:10
3.	"A Cinema Spine"	4:14
4.	"Miracle Mile"	4:11
5.	"Twenty Four Minus Eighteen"	3:38
6.	"Jaws of Life"	3:59
7.	"Goodnight Quiet Noise"	3:54
8.	"Split Lip Envy"	3:09
9.	"Paranoia Pays Off"	3:52
10.	"When the Feeling Fades"	5:32
11.	"Abracadaver"	3:37
12.	"Low End of Luxury"	5:29
13.	"Arrive Alive"	3:26
14.	"After Arguments"	3:57
15.	"Unfit"	7:17
