= Pollen (band) =

American power pop band

- Origin: Tempe, Arizona, United States; Pittsburgh, Pennsylvania, United States.
- Genres: Power pop Pop punk
- Years active: 1993–2001
- Labels: Fueled By Ramen, Wind-up, Grass
- Past members: Dan Hargest (Vocals); Kevin Scanlon (Guitar); Chris Serafini (Bass); Mike Bennett (Guitar); Bob Hoag (Drums)

Pollen was a power pop band originally hailing from Pittsburgh, Pennsylvania, United States. They released four albums and two split records over their eight years together. In 2021, it was announced that their third record, Peach Tree, would be re-released on vinyl for the first time.

== Band members ==
- Dan Hargest (Vocals)
- Kevin Scanlon (Guitar)
- Chris Serafini (Bass)
- Mike Bennett (Guitar)
- Bob Hoag (Drums)

== Discography ==
=== Albums ===
Album	Record label	Release date	Notes
Bluette	Grass Records	(1994)	
Crescent	Grass Records	(1995)	
Peach Tree	Wind-up Records	(1997)	
Co-ed/Pollen: A Split Recording	Cool Guy Records	(1999)	This was a split LP featuring songs by both Pollen and Co-ed.
Chip	Fueled By Ramen	(2000)	
"Chip Jr. (Slim Case EP)"	Fueled By Ramen	(2000)	
"Inisplitep Husking Bee\Pollen"	inicorporation (Japan)	(2000)	

=== Compilations ===
- Not One Light Red: A Modified Document (Sunset Alliance, 2000)

Track: A Clear Complexion
