= Fivespeed =

American band

- Origin: Peoria, Arizona, United States
- Genres: punk rock, nu metal
- Years active: 1997–2006, 2009–2011
- Labels: Sunset Alliance, Equal Vision Records, Virgin Records
- Members: Jared Woosley; Jesse LaCross; Brad Cole; Matt Turner; Shane Addington
- Website: Fivespeed's Official Website

Fivespeed was an American rock band, formed in Peoria, Arizona, United States, in 1997, and later based in Phoenix, Arizona. While in the beginning, Fivespeed's style was greatly influenced by the punk and hard-core movements, its later efforts could be described as a mixture of nu metal and mainstream rock.

== History ==
=== The early years ===
Fivespeed released their self-titled debut EP, which also became known as First of The Compact Cars, on what was then a brand new independent record label called Sunset Alliance Records, on May 22, 2001.

Their label soon changed ownership, but that was all to Fivespeed's benefit, since the new owner, Dave Jensen, was one of their biggest fans. Jensen believed greatly in the band, and gambled big on their success, even mortgaging his house to help pay for the recording of their debut full-length. The band worked for five months with Larry Elyea at Mind's Eye Digital to record and produce that album, which would be called Trade in Your Halo. On September 10, 2002, Sunset Alliance released Trade in Your Halo to much success. This record helped the group gain significant exposure, allowing them to play side stage on the 2002 Vans Warped Tour with fellow Arizona natives Jimmy Eat World, among others. In addition, when the record earned Fivespeed a major label deal with Virgin Records, David Jensen's gamble paid off as Virgin helped him settle all of this debts and put Sunset Alliance back in the black.

=== Post-Sunset Alliance ===
The positive press that Fivespeed was able to attract thanks to Trade in Your Halo drew the attention of major labels and led the band to conclude a recording contract with Virgin Records. This event brought new opportunities for the band as they suddenly had the money to tour more frequently and to record a new album. After releasing their second EP, Bella, on indie label Equal Vision Records, their major label debut with Virgin Records, Morning Over Midnight, was released on January 24, 2006 and quickly garnered more attention for the band with its single "The Mess."

Unfortunately, even with all of the positivity that flowed from the major successes of 2006, that also ended up being a major year of crisis for the group. While touring that year, the band had $60,000 worth of gear stolen from them. In what might foreshadow events that were yet to come, Virgin was reticent to aid them in fully replacing any of that gear. Then, Virgin Records dropped Fivespeed from its line-up later that year while they were in the middle of a tour. According to lead-singer Jared Woosley, the main reason that they lost that relationship was a change in the label's management.

Pressured by their money woes and lead-singer Jared Woosley's heroin addiction, Fivespeed fell apart and went into inactivity.

=== Hiatus, Reunion, and Break-up ===
Each of the band's members pursued other projects during their initial hiatus. Jared Woosley joined Larry Elyea (who had produced and recorded Fivespeed's two albums) in Giantkiller, formed Paper Airplane with Matt Turner, and had a solo project called Jet Black Holiday. Matt Turner and Shane Addington went back to their project The Desperate Hours, and Brad Cole and Chad Martin joined David Jensen (formerly of Before Braille) to play in Art for Starters.

In early 2009, the problems of Fivespeed's past (drugs, etc.) had dissipated and members reunited to start recording. One of their first "reunion" shows was to celebrate the ten-year anniversary of their former label, Sunset Alliance. Fivespeed continued to rise in its success post-hiatus, and in 2010 the band was awarded Best Rock Band, as well as Best Alternative Band at the 2010 Arizona Ska Punk Awards. They released their last record, The Way We War EP, in May 2011. However, because there have not been any updates since mid-2011, the band appears to be once again on hiatus.

Jared Woosley now lends vocals to the band My Darling Murder, while members Jesse LaCross and Matt Turner have joined the band Modern Day Infami.

== Discography ==
=== Albums ===
Release date	Title	Label	Notes
2001	Self-Titled EP	Sunset Alliance	Also known as First of the Compact Cars.
2002	Trade In Your Halo LP	Sunset Alliance	
2005	Bella EP	Equal Vision	Released exclusively online and at shows.
2006	Morning Over Midnight LP	Virgin Records	
2011	The Way We War EP	self-released	

=== Compilations ===
- The Emo Diaries Chapter 4: An Ocean of Doubt (Deep Elm Records 1999)

Song: What's Our Dilemma

- Triplesplit Series, Vol. 1: Fivespeed/Before Braille/Andherson (Sunset Alliance 2000)

Songs: Blood Over Wine; Kid; Fallen Through

- Not One Light Red: A Modified Document (Sunset Alliance 2000)

Song: Blood Over Wine

- Not One Light Red: A Desert Extended Compilation (Sunset Alliance 2003)

Song: In the AM

- Sunset Alliance Discography 1999-2001 (Sunset Alliance 2011)

Various prior releases

- Sunset Alliance Discography 2005-2011 (Sunset Alliance 2011)

Songs: Crucial Three; Blackened Crisis (Original Extended Version); What's Our Dilemma (Halo Session); Yellow Illiterate (Halo Session)

== Band members ==
Current line-up

- Jared Woosley – Vocals (1997–Present)
- Jesse LaCross – Guitar (1997–Present)
- Brad Cole - Guitar (1997–Present)
- Shane Addington - Drums (2004–Present)
- Matt Turner - Bass (2005–Present)

Past members

- Rob Anderson - Bass (1997–2005)
- Chad Kinney - Drums (1997–2001)
- Chad Martin - Drums (2001–2004)
