= Audioconfusion =

Recording studio in Mesa, Arizona

- Type: Recording studio
- Industry: Music
- Genre: Various (indie rock, metal, singer-songwriter, punk rock, garage rock, folk punk, country, bluegrass, experimental/noise)
- Founded: 1996
- Area served: Mesa, Arizona
- Key people: Jalipaz Nelson, Daniel Somers
- Website: www.audioconfusion.com

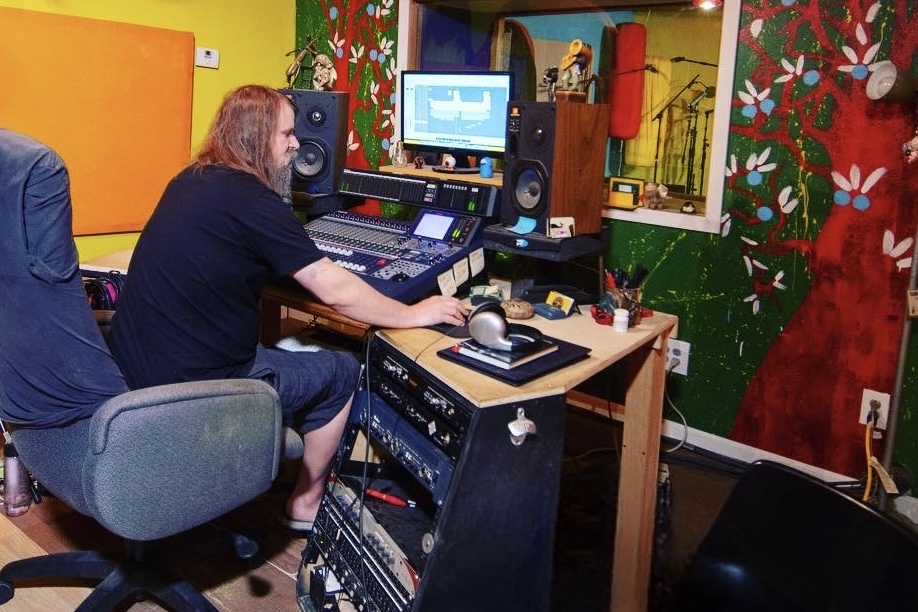

Audioconfusion is a recording studio in Mesa, Arizona. It was established 1996. The newest incarnation of the studio was built in 2006. It is owned and operated by Jalipaz Nelson. Audioconfusion is notable for its production and recording of various independent Phoenix bands, especially the first four studio albums by AJJ (and the majority of all of their recorded output with the exception of their two most recent studio records). The studio's sound emphasizes natural reverb and live recording methods.

== History ==
Originally from Pennsylvania, Jalipaz Nelson settled in Arizona at the premature culmination of a road trip when he was hindered from crossing the California border due to ferret regulations. In 1995, Nelson attended an introductory recording program in Ohio prior to starting Audioconfusion in 1996. In 2004, he began The Audioconfusion Manifesto. In 2006, he constructed a new studio which measures 1000 ft^{2}. He later partnered with Dan Somers, an early department head of Radio Phoenix.

The Audioconfusion Manifesto was an independent record label and musical collective (the titular manifesto was non-existent). Bands in the Phoenix scene organized around recording at the newly constructed Audioconfusion studio. Participating bands included AJJ, Peachcake, and Asleep in the Sea. The first studio album by AJJ, Candy Cigarettes & Cap Guns, was originally released by The Audioconfusion Manifesto and recorded at Audioconfusion, prior to being re-released on Asian Man Records. In 2010, a similar collective and label outfit called Black Cactus Records was founded. Both Nelson and Somers were founding members.

== Artists ==
Artists produced by Jalipaz Nelson and Audioconfusion include:

- AJJ
- The Necronauts
- Red Tank!
- Jeremiah Craig
- Okilly Dokilly
- The Edisons
- Beach Bummer
- Blu Joy
- Citrus Clouds
- Funerary
- Lisa Savidge
- JJCNV
- Diners
- Dogbreth
- Playboy Manbaby
- The Haymarket Squares
- The Oxford Coma
- The Old Storm
- Snail Quail
- Sundressed
- Twingiant
- Gloomsday
- Asleep in the Sea
- Peachcake
- The Echo Bombs
- Paronym
- Some Dark Hollow
- Scott Gesser
- Shawn Skinner and the Men of Reason
- Huckleberry
- Tony Martinez
- Gale
- FGGTFAILUR
- Hug of War
- Eric Schlappi
- Tierra Firme
- Space Alien Donald
- Sad Dance Party

== Selected discography ==
Year	Artist	Title
2005	AJJ	"Candy Cigarettes & Cap Guns"
2006	Peachcake	"Now We Have Something to Celebrate"
2007	AJJ	"People Who Can Eat People Are the Luckiest People in the World"
2008	Peachcake	"What Year Will You Have the World?"
2009	AJJ	"Can't Maintain"
2010	The Necronauts	"Gauche et Droite" (released on High School Football Records, Black Cactus Records)
2011	AJJ	"Knife Man" (released on Asian Man Records)
2014	Funerary	"Starless Aeon"
2015	Red Tank!	"I Want You to Crowdsurf My Body at My Funeral"
2016	Red Tank!	"BIO/FEEDBACK"
2016	Dogbreth	"Second Home" (released on Asian Man Records)
2016	Diners	"Three" (released on Asian Man Records)
2016	Okilly Dokilly	"Howdilly Doodilly"
