= People (disambiguation) =

A people is a cohearent social, cultural, or ethnic group.

People may also prefer to:

- The plural form of person

== Books and publication ==
- People (play), a play by Alan Bennett
- People (magazine), an American celebrity news magazine
- People (Australian magazine), originally an Australian general-interest magazine, latterly a men's magazine

== Film and television ==
- People (TV series), a 1955 Canadian television series
- People (film), a 2004 French comedy film
- People, a talk show hosted by Indian actor Anupam Kher on Republic TV

== Music ==
- People Records, one of the Record labels owned by James Brown
- People!, a 1960s rock band

=== Albums ===
- People (Animal Collective EP)
- People (Babe the Blue Ox album)
- People (Barbra Streisand album)
- People (Code Kunst album)
- People (The Golden Republic EP)
- People (Hillsong United album)
- People (Hothouse Flowers album)
- People (Howard Jones album)
- People (James Brown album)
- People (Johnny Mathis album)

=== Songs ===
- "People" (Agust D song)
- "People" (Barbra Streisand song)
- "People" (King Crimson song)
- "People" (Libianca song)
- "People" (Mi-Sex song)
- "People" (The 1975 song)
- "People", a song by Level 42 on the 1983 album Standing in the Light
- "People", a song by Andrew Jackson Jihad on the 2007 album People That Can Eat People Are the Luckiest People in the World
- "People II: The Reckoning", a song by Andrew Jackson Jihad on the 2007 album People That Can Eat People Are the Luckiest People in the World
- "People II 2: Still Peoplin'", a song by Andrew Jackson Jihad on the 2011 album Knife Man
- "People", a song by thenewno2 on the 2008 album You Are Here (Thenewno2 album)
- "People", a song by Gorillaz on the 2005 single "Dare" (song)
- "People", a song by Fat Mattress on the 1970 album Fat Mattress II

== Businesses and organisations ==
- People's, an Austrian airline
- Peoples, former name of China Mobile Hong Kong (CMHK)
- Peoples (store), a defunct department store chain in Tacoma, Washington
- Peoples II, a jewelry store chain in Canada
- Peoples Drug, a chain of drug stores based in Alexandria, Virginia
- People, the original name of the Green Party (UK)

== Persons ==
- Ann Peoples (1947–2019), American politician
- Ann Peoples (Antarctic manager), American anthropologist
- Ben Peoples (born 2001), American baseball player
- Camerun Peoples (born 1999), American football player
- David Peoples (born 1940), American screenwriter
- David Peoples (golfer) (born 1960), American professional golfer
- Dottie Peoples (born 1950), American gospel singer
- John Peoples (educator) (born 1926), American mathematician, president of Jackson State University (1967–1984)
- John Peoples Jr. (1933–2025), American physicist
- Michael Peoples (born 1991), American professional baseball player
- Nany People (born 1965), Brazilian comedian, actress, journalist, and former drag queen
- Theo Peoples (born 1961), American singer

== Other ==
- Outlook People, formerly named People, a consumer web-based address book service
- People (software), an address book application integrated into certain versions of Microsoft Windows

== See also ==
- People skills, ability to communicate effectively with people in a friendly way, especially in business
- Person (disambiguation)
- My People (disambiguation)
- The People (disambiguation)
- Popular (disambiguation)
- Folk (disambiguation)
- Humans
