= Real People =

Real People may refer to:

- Human, a species
  - People, or all humans as a whole
- Real People (TV program), a television show that aired on NBC in the United States from 1979 to 1984
- Real People (album), a 1980 album by funk/disco group Chic
  - "Real People" (song), by Chic
- The Real People, a British indie band
- Realpeople, a side project of Zach F. Condon, better known from his solo musical project Beirut
- Real People, a 2015 album by rapper Lyrics Born
- "Real People", a song by Ice Cube and Common from the 2016 soundtrack Barbershop: The Next Cut

== See also ==
- Real People Group, a South African company
- People (disambiguation)
- The People (disambiguation)
