= Can We Get Together =

Compilation album by various artists
- Released: March 14, 2011
- Genre: Various
- Length: 2:15:04
- Language: English/Spanish
- Label: CoSeismic Records
- Producer: Robert W. Current, Ph.D.

Singles from Can We Get Together
- 1. "Ken I Go Fishin'" Released: March 1, 2011

Professional ratings
Review scores
Source	Rating
iTunes Store	5/5 stars
Cross Rhythms	7/10 stars
Amazon.com	5/5 stars

Can We Get Together is a charity compilation album benefiting those affected by the assassination attempt on congresswoman Gabby Giffords. The project was the creative vision of University of Arizona law student Robert Current to benefit the victims who didn't have insurance, with proceeds to Homicide Survivors of Tucson. The album featured 117 Southern Arizona musicians, plus various local Tucson studios, engineers, and producers, and was released through the iTunes Store, Amazon.com and in a double CD with national distribution on March 14, 2011, through unknown indie label CoSeismic Records. Later that year the concept was taken by Luz de Vida, another album featuring some of the same artists as Can We Get Together.

The album features a wide range of music from University of Arizona music professors performing classical works, to local Tucson musicians performing styles including rap, hip-hop, punk rock, Christian, blues, big band swing, reggae, folk, adult contemporary, and mariachi music. Many of the artists had a close personal connection to the 2011 Tucson shooting, and several songs were written specifically about the shooting.

Studios in Southern Arizona that contributed time listed in the liner notes include Audioconfusion Studios, Billy Joseph Productions, Black Scorpion and Far Out Musicians, Chukshon Recording Studio, Daveguitar Sound, Delicious Delicious, Draco Studios, Gary Ray Recordings, Jack Miller Productions, JTG Studio, Live Sound at Crowder Hall at University of Arizona, Live Sound at Pima Community College Recital Hall, Luna Studios, Next Door Studios, OG7 Studios, The Den Studios, The University of Arizona School of Music, Wavelab, and Wet Kitchen Studios.

== Reception ==
The country music single “Ken I Go Fishin'” by the Chip Ritter Band was released two weeks before the album on March 1, 2011, to promote it. The radio version is shorter than the album version.

Local media attention for Can We Get Together was very high in Tucson, receiving praise for its charitable purpose and large scale accomplishment based entirely locally without outside funding. One source stated, "Punk rock bands and sentimental tribute albums don't normally go hand in hand, but Wax 78 is no typical punk band", and went on to state that their participation "belies the punk genre's reputation for hard-edged nihilism".

However, the album did not receive wide acknowledgment outside of Tucson, and what few international reviews can be found state it was a slightly above average commercial release. Cross Rhythms gave it only 7 of 10 stars saying the title track was “rather dull and repetitive effort” and after praising several songs, they noted “some of the tracks are of little more than demo quality but with handsomely designed packaging and such a worthy cause it is easy to overlook a few damp squibs.”

With local attention building, the small indie album was quickly and completely eclipsed by Songs for Japan, a charity album released 11 days later on March 25. The latter album highlighted a larger tragedy affecting more people, featured internationally known artists, was promoted by the music industry's "big four" record labels (EMI, Sony, Universal, and Warner), featured 8 more songs (38 vs. 30) and sold for less than half the price. Ironically, the Can We Get Together album's first track on disk two was titled “Tsunami” (which SeaShell Radio had previously performed at a vigil for Giffords and the other shooting victims) and was written long before the Japanese tsunami.

== Track listing ==
The album features 30 tracks.

Disc one
No.	Title	Artist(s)	Length
1.	"Can We Get Together"	Kelly Pardi featuring Lori Richardson & The Tucson Girls Chorus	6:18
2.	"Fallen For You"	Compose the Octave	3:08
3.	"Palo Verde"	David Rose	2:33
4.	"Ave Maria"	Rodriguez & Keep Duo	2:58
5.	"Arpeggione Sonata" (written by Franz Schubert)	Votapek & Milbauer	11:50
6.	"Sonata, BWV 1033: Andante-Presto" (written by Bach)	Luce & McLaughlin	1:39
7.	"Sonata, BWV 1033: Allegro" (written by Bach)	Luce & McLaughlin	2:15
8.	"Sonata, BWV 1033: Adagio" (written by Bach)	Luce & McLaughlin	1:36
9.	"Sonata, BWV 1033: Menuett 1 & 2" (written by Bach)	Luce & McLaughlin	2:20
10.	"Sonata in D Major, Op. 102, No 2" (written by Ludwig van Beethoven)	Votapek & Milbauer	16:55
11.	"When the Sun Shines Through"	John Monfore	3:22
12.	"Hand in Hand"	Big band Express	5:01
13.	"My Every Fear" (written by Willy Arvizu)	Adalberto	3:56
14.	"Puddles" (written by Kelly Pardi)	The Tucson Girls Chorus	2:10

Disc two
No.	Title	Artist(s)	Length
1.	"Tsunami" (Remix)	Seashell Radio	4:16
2.	"You and Me"	Ten Times Gravity	5:01
3.	"Ken I Go Fishin'" (Extended Version)	Chip Ritter featuring Vince Moreno	5:13
4.	"I'll Come to You"	Lori Richardson featuring Jim Glinski	4:36
5.	"Your Heart Lives in Mine"	Cynthia Correa	4:41
6.	"I Seen Love"	Ruben Ruiz & Jim Glinski	3:23
7.	"So Fly" (radio edit)	The Terrifix	4:50
8.	"Carry On Together"	Beyond the Firewall	3:37
9.	"Monet"	Wax 78	2:52
10.	"Seems Like Yesterday"	Chorizmex	2:59
11.	"Dream" (written by David "Arutti" Arutyunov)	Volodia	4:41
12.	"21st Century"	Neon Prophet	4:18
13.	"Nostalgia" (re-released with lyrics)	El Cielo Azul	3:38
14.	"Another Tucson Sunset"	Whyte Panther	2:49
15.	"Saturday Morning"	Ron Walker	4:31
16.	"Arriba El Mariachi"	Mariachi Cielo de Mexico	2:54

Single
No.	Title	Artist(s)	Length
1.	"Ken I Go Fishin'" (Radio Version)	Chip Ritter featuring Vince Moreno	3:30
