= 1991 in baseball =

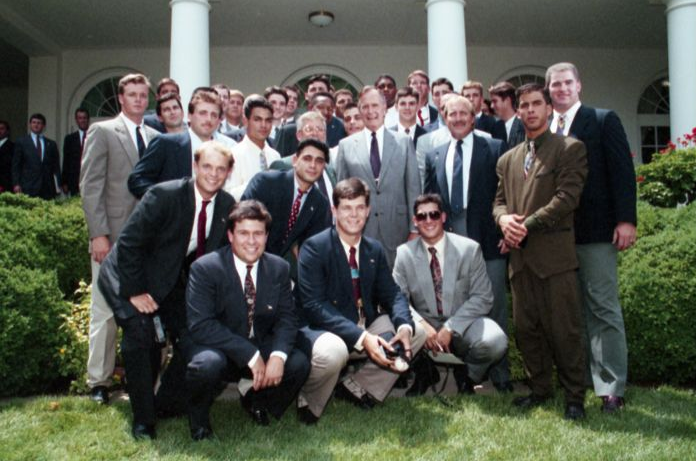
President Bush poses for a photo with the 1991 College World Series Champion LSU Tigers.

The following are the baseball events of the year 1991 throughout the world.

== Champions ==
=== Major League Baseball ===
- World Series: Minnesota Twins over Atlanta Braves (4-3); Jack Morris, MVP

League Championship Series (ALCS, NLCS)
East	Toronto	1
West	Minnesota	4
East	Pittsburgh	3
West	Atlanta	4

World Series
AL	Minnesota	4
NL	Atlanta	3

- American League Championship Series MVP: Kirby Puckett
- National League Championship Series MVP: Steve Avery
- All-Star Game, July 9 at SkyDome: American League, 4-2; Cal Ripken Jr., MVP

=== Other champions ===
- Caribbean World Series: Tigres de Licey (Dominican Republic)
- College World Series: LSU
- Japan Series: Seibu Lions over Hiroshima Toyo Carp (4-3)
- Korean Series: Haitai Tigers over Binggrae Eagles
- Big League World Series: Taipei, Taiwan
- Junior League World Series: Spring, Texas
- Little League World Series: Hsi Nan, Taichung, Taiwan
- Senior League World Series: Pingtung, Taiwan
- Pan American Games: Cuba over Puerto Rico
- Taiwan Series: Uni-President Lions over Wei Chuan Dragons

== Awards and honors ==
- Baseball Hall of Fame
  - Rod Carew
  - Ferguson Jenkins
  - Tony Lazzeri
  - Gaylord Perry
  - Bill Veeck
- Most Valuable Player
  - Cal Ripken Jr., Baltimore Orioles, SS (AL)
  - Terry Pendleton, Atlanta Braves, 3B (NL)
- Cy Young Award
  - Roger Clemens, Boston Red Sox (AL)
  - Tom Glavine, Atlanta Braves (NL)
- Rookie of the Year
  - Chuck Knoblauch, Minnesota Twins, 2B (AL)
  - Jeff Bagwell, Houston Astros, 1B (NL)
- Manager of the Year Award
  - Tom Kelly, Minnesota Twins (AL)
  - Bobby Cox, Atlanta Braves (NL)
- Woman Executive of the Year (major or minor league): Marta Hiczewski, Buffalo Bisons, American Association
- Gold Glove Award
  - Don Mattingly (1B) (AL)
  - Roberto Alomar (2B) (AL)
  - Robin Ventura (3B) (AL)
  - Cal Ripken Jr. (SS) (AL)
  - Ken Griffey Jr. (OF) (AL)
  - Kirby Puckett (OF) (AL)
  - Devon White (OF) (AL)
  - Tony Peña (C) (AL)
  - Mark Langston (P) (AL)
  - Will Clark (1B) (NL)
  - Ryne Sandberg (2B) (NL)
  - Matt Williams (3B) (NL)
  - Ozzie Smith (SS) (NL)
  - Barry Bonds (OF) (NL)
  - Tony Gwynn (OF) (NL)
  - Andy Van Slyke (OF) (NL)
  - Tom Pagnozzi (C) (NL)
  - Greg Maddux (P) (NL)

== MLB statistical leaders ==
	American League		National League
Type	Name	Stat	Name	Stat
AVG	Julio Franco TEX	.341	Terry Pendleton ATL	.319
HR	Jose Canseco OAK; Cecil Fielder DET	44	Howard Johnson NYM	38
RBI	Cecil Fielder DET	133	Howard Johnson NYM	117
Wins	Scott Erickson MIN; Bill Gullickson DET	20	Tom Glavine ATL; John Smiley PIT	20
ERA	Roger Clemens BOS	2.62	Dennis Martínez MON	2.39

== Major league baseball final standings ==
American League
Rank	Club	Wins	Losses	Win %	GB
East Division
1st	Toronto Blue Jays	91	71	.562	--
2nd	Boston Red Sox	84	78	.519	7.0
2nd	Detroit Tigers	84	78	.519	7.0
4th	Milwaukee Brewers	83	79	.512	8.0
5th	New York Yankees	71	91	.438	20.0
6th	Baltimore Orioles	67	95	.414	24.0
7th	Cleveland Indians	57	105	.352	34.0
West Division
1st	Minnesota Twins	95	67	.586	--
2nd	Chicago White Sox	87	75	.537	8.0
3rd	Texas Rangers	85	77	.525	10.0
4th	Oakland Athletics	84	78	.519	11.0
5th	Seattle Mariners	83	79	.512	12.0
6th	Kansas City Royals	82	80	.506	13.0
7th	California Angels	81	81	.500	14.0

National League
Rank	Club	Wins	Losses	Win %	GB
East Division
1st	Pittsburgh Pirates	98	64	.605	--
2nd	St. Louis Cardinals	84	78	.519	14.0
3rd	Chicago Cubs	77	83	.481	20.0
4th	Philadelphia Phillies	78	84	.481	20.0
5th	New York Mets	77	84	.478	20.5
6th	Montreal Expos	71	90	.441	26.5
West Division
1st	Atlanta Braves	94	68	.580	--
2nd	Los Angeles Dodgers	93	69	.574	1.0
3rd	San Diego Padres	84	78	.519	10.0
4th	San Francisco Giants	75	87	.463	19.0
5th	Cincinnati Reds	74	88	.457	20.0
6th	Houston Astros	65	97	.401	29.0

== Managers ==
=== American League ===
Team	Manager	Comments
Baltimore Orioles	Frank Robinson	Replaced during the season by Johnny Oates
Boston Red Sox	Joe Morgan	
California Angels	Doug Rader	Replaced during the season by Buck Rodgers
Chicago White Sox	Jeff Torborg	
Cleveland Indians	John McNamara	Replaced during the season by Mike Hargrove
Detroit Tigers	Sparky Anderson	
Kansas City Royals	John Wathan	Replaced during the season by Hal McRae
Milwaukee Brewers	Tom Trebelhorn	
Minnesota Twins	Tom Kelly	Won the World Series
New York Yankees	Stump Merrill	
Oakland Athletics	Tony La Russa	
Seattle Mariners	Jim Lefebvre	
Texas Rangers	Bobby Valentine	
Toronto Blue Jays	Cito Gaston	Replaced temporarily by Gene Tenace while undergoing treatment for a herniated disc, Won American League East

=== National League ===
Team	Manager	Comments
Atlanta Braves	Bobby Cox	Won National League pennant
Chicago Cubs	Don Zimmer	Replaced during the season by Jim Essian
Cincinnati Reds	Lou Piniella	
Houston Astros	Art Howe	
Los Angeles Dodgers	Tommy Lasorda	
Montreal Expos	Buck Rodgers	Replaced during the season by Tom Runnels
New York Mets	Bud Harrelson	Replaced during the season by Mike Cubbage
Philadelphia Phillies	Nick Leyva	Replaced during the season by Jim Fregosi
Pittsburgh Pirates	Jim Leyland	Won National League East
St. Louis Cardinals	Joe Torre	
San Diego Padres	Greg Riddoch	
San Francisco Giants	Roger Craig	

== Events ==
=== January ===
- January 6 – Alan Wiggins, former leadoff hitter for the San Diego Padres and a key member of their 1984 pennant run, becomes the first baseball player known to die of AIDS. He was 32.
- January 7
  - Pete Rose is released from Marion Federal Penitentiary after serving a five-month sentence for tax evasion.
  - The Oakland Athletics sign infielder Vance Law.
- January 8 – Rod Carew, Gaylord Perry and Ferguson Jenkins are elected to the Hall of Fame by the Baseball Writers' Association of America, with Carew becoming the 22nd player to be named in his first year of eligibility.
- January 10 – The Baltimore Orioles trade outfielder Steve Finley, and pitchers Pete Harnisch and Curt Schilling to the Houston Astros for power hitting first baseman Glenn Davis. The deal backfires as an injury-prone Davis never plays an entire season over the course of the next three years and Finley, Harnisch, and Schilling all go on to become star players.
- January 22 – The Atlanta Braves sign veteran catcher Mike Heath.
- January 25 – The Texas Rangers sign relief pitcher Goose Gossage.
- January 30 – The Atlanta Braves sign Deion Sanders, making Sanders a two sport athlete. Sanders also played for the Atlanta Falcons of the NFL at the time of his signing with the Braves.

=== February ===
- February 4 – The 12 members of the board of directors of the Hall of Fame vote unanimously to ban Pete Rose from the ballot. Now Rose becomes eligible again only if the MLB commissioner reinstates him by December 2005.
- February 15 – The Montreal Expos sign Ron Hassey. Hassey would be the catcher for Denny Martinez's perfect game in July of the 1991 season.
- February 17 – The New York Yankees release pitcher Dave LaPoint.
- February 26 – New York Yankees second baseman Tony Lazzeri and major league owner Bill Veeck are elected to the Hall of Fame by the Veterans Committee.
- February 28 – Players win just seven of seventeen in arbitration cases, yet the average award over all seventeen cases, equates to a 104% salary increase. Pittsburgh Pirates pitcher Doug Drabek receives a record $3.35 million.

=== March ===
- March 11 – Attempting a comeback after seven years retired, 45-year old Jim Palmer starts an exhibition game for the Baltimore Orioles against the Boston Red Sox. Palmer gives up five hits and two runs in two innings of work, and it is revealed he has a torn hamstring after the start. Palmer retires from baseball permanently two days later.
- March 14 – The California Angels trade Dante Bichette to the Milwaukee Brewers for Dave Parker
- March 18 – Bo Jackson is released by the Kansas City Royals.
- March 28 – Fernando Valenzuela is released by the Los Angeles Dodgers.

=== April ===
- April 1 – The New York Mets release outfielder Terry Puhl.
- April 3 – Bo Jackson is signed as a free agent by the Chicago White Sox.
- April 5 – After spending the previous seven seasons in Japan, Warren Cromartie returns to the states when he signs a contract with the Kansas City Royals.
- April 7
  - The Chicago Cubs trade Mitch Williams to the Philadelphia Phillies in exchange for Bob Scanlan and Chuck McElroy.
  - After being released by the Yankees, Dave LaPoint is signed as a free agent by the Philadelphia Phillies. He is released less than two weeks later.
- April 8:
  - Just hours before the first pitch of the baseball season, MLB averts an umpires strike by reaching agreement with the Major League Umpires Association on a new four-year contract.
  - Darryl Kile makes his MLB debut, coming on in relief of pitcher Jim Clancy in the Houston Astros 6-2 loss to the Cincinnati Reds.
- April 9 – Chuck Knoblauch makes his MLB debut for the Minnesota Twins, going 0-3 and drawing one walk in the Twins 7-2 loss to Oakland.
- April 11 – Junior Ortiz throws out Rickey Henderson when Henderson attempts to steal second base. Henderson was attempting to break Lou Brock's stolen base record. Henderson later hurts his calf in the game and is forced to leave.
- April 18 – The new Comiskey Park opens across the street from where the original stands in Chicago. A sold-out stadium sees the Detroit Tigers defeat the Chicago White Sox, 16–0.
- April 21 – The Chicago Cubs score five runs in the top of the eleventh inning, but the Pittsburgh Pirates come back with six runs in the bottom of the inning for the victory. It is the greatest extra-innings comeback, in terms of runs, in Major League history.
- April 23 – Nick Leyva is dismissed as manager of the Philadelphia Phillies, becoming the first of several managers fired during the season.

=== May ===
- May 1:
  - Nolan Ryan of the Texas Rangers records his seventh no-hitter, striking out Roberto Alomar for the final out in a 3-0 victory over the Toronto Blue Jays.
  - Rickey Henderson of the Oakland Athletics records his 939th stolen base, eclipsing Lou Brock's all-time record.
- May 9 – Andy Hawkins is released by the New York Yankees.
- May 21 – Don Zimmer is fired as manager of the Chicago Cubs and replaced by Joe Altobelli for one game, then Jim Essian. Zimmer is the second manager fired during the 1991 season.
- May 22 – John Wathan is fired as manager of the Kansas City Royals and replaced by Hal McRae. Wathan is the third manager fired in less than one month.
- May 23 – By stealing second base from pitcher Ron Darling and catcher Rick Cerone of the New York Mets, Andre Dawson of the Chicago Cubs becomes the third player in baseball history to record 300 home runs and 300 stolen bases. As of this date, the only other members of the 300-300 club are Bobby Bonds and Willie Mays. On the same day, Philadelphia Phillies pitcher Tommy Greene throws a no-hitter, and the Baltimore Orioles fire Frank Robinson and replace him with Johnny Oates. Robinson is the fourth manager fired on the season, and the third fired in three days.

=== June ===
- June 2 – The Texas Rangers sign Steve Balboni.
- June 3 – Buck Rodgers becomes the fifth managerial casualty of the season, and the third in the National League East. Tom Runnells replaces Rodgers as the new Montreal Expos manager.
- June 10 – The National League votes to choose Miami, Florida, and Denver, Colorado, to form baseball teams for the 1993 season. They beat out Orlando, Florida, St. Petersburg, Florida, Washington, D.C., and Buffalo, New York.
- June 16 – At Stade Olympique Stadium, Otis Nixon of the Atlanta Braves becomes the first player to collect six stolen bases in a single game. Nixon goes 3-for-5 at the plate and steals second and third bases after all three hits in the first, third, and ninth innings. He eventually scores in the former two innings but is stranded on third as the tying run in the ninth, as Ron Gant strikes out for the final out, as the Montreal Expos defeat the Braves 7-6.
- June 17 – Danny Heep is released by the Atlanta Braves.
- June 20 – Ivan Rodriguez cracks the starting line-up for the Texas Rangers and makes his MLB debut, going one for four at the plate, while driving in two runs. Behind the plate, Rodriguez throws out Joey Cora and Warren Newson during their respective attempts to steal second base.
- June 28 – Days after being released by the Milwaukee Brewers, Dave LaPoint signs with the Chicago Cubs, making the Cubs the fourth team that LaPoint had pitched for since spring training.

=== July ===
- July 5 – Fernando Valenzuela is released by the California Angels. The Angels had signed Valenzuela as a free agent in spring training. The Angels would re-sign Valenzuela five days later.
- July 6:
  - The National League publicly announces its two expansion franchises for 1993: the Colorado Rockies and the Florida Marlins.
  - John McNamara, winner of the 1979 National League West division with the Cincinnati Reds and 1986 American League pennant with the Boston Red Sox, is fired as manager of the Cleveland Indians. He is replaced by Mike Hargrove. The firing is the sixth on the season and occurs just as the first half of the season ends.
  - At Royals Stadium, Danny Tartabull of the Kansas City Royals hits three home runs in a 9-7 loss to the Oakland Athletics. The three-home run game is only the fifth in the stadium's history, and the first by a Royal.
- July 7 – Outside a restaurant in Arlington, Texas, American League umpire Steve Palermo is shot and paralyzed from the waist down after aiding a woman who was being mugged. The assailant is later sentenced to 75 years in prison.
- July 9 – Cal Ripken Jr.'s three-run home run lifts the American League to a 4-2 win over the National League in the annual All-Star Game, held at the SkyDome in Toronto. Andre Dawson homers for the NL, who lose for the fourth straight year. Ripken Jr., who also wins the pre-game Home Run Derby, is named the game's MVP.
- July 13 – The Baltimore Orioles throw the second four-man no-hitter in baseball history, as Bob Milacki, Mike Flanagan, Mark Williamson, and Gregg Olson combine for a 2–0 win against the Oakland Athletics. On September 28, 1975, four Oakland Athletics pitchers (Vida Blue, Glenn Abbott, Paul Lindblad, and Rollie Fingers) throw a combined no-hitter against the California Angels.
- July 23 – Jeff Banister appears in a game for the Pittsburgh Pirates, as he pinch hits for pitcher Doug Drabek in the Pirates 12-3 win over the Atlanta Braves. It was Banister's only appearance as a player in the major leagues, though he would manage the Texas Rangers for four seasons.
- July 26 – Montreal Expos pitcher Mark Gardner throws a no-hitter through nine innings, but does not complete it when his team fails to score against Los Angeles Dodgers starter Orel Hershiser and reliever Kip Gross. Gardner loses the no-hitter and the game in the tenth inning when the Dodgers get three hits and score the only run of the game. The Expos only get two hits.
- July 28 – Picking up where Mark Gardner leaves off, Montreal Expos hurler Dennis Martínez throws a perfect game against the Los Angeles Dodgers. The Expos only get four hits, but they do score two runs and give Martínez the thirteenth perfect game in major league history. Ron Hassey, Martínez's catcher, becomes the first player to catch two perfect games, having also caught Len Barker's perfect game ten years earlier.
- July 31 – Two-sport star Deion Sanders helps the Atlanta Braves overcome a 6-2 deficit with a three-run homer in the fifth in an 8-6 win over the Pittsburgh Pirates at Atlanta–Fulton County Stadium. The next day, Sanders reports to the Atlanta Falcons for training camp, as his NFL contract stipulated.

=== August ===
- August 11 – In only his second Major League game, and first Major League start, Wilson Álvarez throws a no-hitter as the Chicago White Sox beat the Baltimore Orioles, 7–0. It is the fifth no-hitter of the 1991 season, not including Mark Gardner's nine inning no-hitter that is lost in the tenth on July 26.
- August 14 – California Angels DH Dave Winfield hits his 400th career home run against the Minnesota Twins. Winfield is the 23rd player in major league history to accomplish the feat.
- August 26:
  - The sixth no-hitter of 1991 is thrown by two-time Cy Young Award winner Bret Saberhagen. The Kansas City Royals pitcher no-hits the Chicago White Sox, 7–0, for his first career no-hitter.
  - The seventh managerial firing of 1991 occurs as the California Angels, who go from first to last in less than one month, fire Doug Rader and replace him with the recently deposed Buck Rodgers.
- August 29 – The California Angels release pitcher Floyd Bannister.

=== September ===
- September 4 – Removing an "asterisk" which is never universally recognized, the Statistical Accuracy Committee decides to put Roger Maris' 61 home run season of 1961 ahead of Babe Ruth's 60 mark of 1927. Regarding the expunging of the asterisk, historian Bill Deane later points out that it is an easy job and the asterisk never exists. Maris' record is, from 1962 until 1991, listed separately from Ruth's and is never actually defined by 'some distinctive mark.' The eight-man panel also re-defines a no-hit game as one which ends after nine or more innings with one team failing to get a hit, thereby removing 50 games from the list that is previously considered hitless, including the 1959 performance of the Pittsburgh Pirates' Harvey Haddix, who pitched 12 perfect innings against the Milwaukee Braves, and the Cincinnati Reds' Jim Maloney's 1965 1–0 loss to the New York Mets in 11 innings. Another casualty is Boston Red Sox reliever Ernie Shore's 27 straight outs on June 23, 1917, a game in which he relieves Babe Ruth after Ruth is ejected for protesting a walk to Ray Morgan, the first Washington Senators batter he faces. Morgan is thrown out trying to steal second, and Shore retires all 26 men he faces in a 4–0 win‚ getting credit in the books for a perfect game.
- September 11 – The Atlanta Braves, on the verge of a pennant, throw a three-man no-hitter at Atlanta–Fulton County Stadium against the San Diego Padres. Kent Mercker, Mark Wohlers, and Alejandro Peña combine to no-hit the San Diego Padres, the seventh no-hitter of 1991. Controversy ensues when Darrin Jackson apparently ends the no-hitter with two outs in the ninth inning but the official scorer rules it an error on Terry Pendleton.
- September 13 – A piece of concrete weighing several tons falls in Montréal's Olympic Stadium, forcing the Montreal Expos to play the remainder of their home games on the road.
- September 14 – Cecil Fielder of the Detroit Tigers hits what is the only home run to ever exit Milwaukee County Stadium during either the Braves' Milwaukee history (1953–1965) or Brewers' park history (1970–2000). The blast comes off Brewer pitcher Dan Plesac (who later joined the MLB Network team) in the fourth inning of a 6–4 Tiger victory.
- September 15 – Smokey Burgess, a former major leaguer and previous holder of the record for most pinch-hits, dies at age 64.
- September 16 – Otis Nixon, the league's leading base stealer and catalyst on the Atlanta Braves' run from last to first, fails a drug test and is suspended for sixty days, consisting of the rest of the 1991 baseball season and the first six weeks of the 1992 season. The Braves lose the first two games without Nixon but rebound to win the National League pennant.
- September 22 – The Pittsburgh Pirates become the first National League East team since the 1976-77-78 Philadelphia Phillies to win consecutive division titles when they beat their in-state rival Phillies, 2–1.
- September 29:
  - The Minnesota Twins become the first team to ever go from last place to first over the course of one season when a Chicago White Sox loss to the Seattle Mariners clinches the American League West title. It is the Twins' first division crown since 1987.
  - The New York Mets fire manager Bud Harrelson, the eighth managerial firing of the year.
  - The Atlanta Braves trade pitchers Yorkis Perez and Turk Wendell to the Chicago Cubs for pitcher Mike Bielecki and catcher Damon Berryhill.

=== October ===
- October 2:
  - Atlanta Braves pitcher Tom Glavine becomes the first 20-game winner in the majors by beating the Cincinnati Reds. The win assures Glavine of the Cy Young Award when it is given in November.
  - The Toronto Blue Jays capture their third American League East title since 1985 by beating the California Angels 6–5 on a walk-off RBI single by Joe Carter. The same day, the Blue Jays become the first team to ever play before more than four million fans in a single season.
- October 3 – Chicago White Sox catcher Carlton Fisk hits two home runs, including a grand slam, to lead the White Sox to a 13–12 victory over the Minnesota Twins. In doing so, just nine months shy of his 44th birthday, Fisk becomes the oldest 20th-century player to collect a two-HR game. His 7th-inning grand slam off Steve Bedrosian also makes him the oldest major leaguer ever to hit a bases-loaded homer. Cap Anson, at 45, hits two home runs on this date in 1897, and is the oldest major league player to hit a pair.
- October 4 – The Seattle Mariners beat the Chicago White Sox 6–4 to clinch their first winning season in franchise history.
- October 5 – The Atlanta Braves become the second team in two weeks to go from last to first when they beat the Houston Astros, 5–2. Moments later, the San Francisco Giants eliminate their arch-rivals, the Los Angeles Dodgers, when Trevor Wilson pitches a 4–0 complete game shutout, handing the National League West division title to the Braves. John Smoltz gets his fourteenth win of the season as the Braves close out with eight consecutive wins after trailing the Dodgers by two with only ten games left to play.
- October 6:
  - New York Mets pitcher David Cone ties a National League record by striking out 19 Philadelphia Phillies in a 7–0 Mets win over their rivals.
  - The Detroit Tigers beat the Baltimore Orioles 7–1 in the last Orioles game ever played at Baltimore Memorial Stadium.
- October 7:
  - Leo Durocher, who is credited with the phrase 'nice guys finish last', dies at the age of 86.
  - The New York Yankees fire Stump Merrill, the ninth major league manager fired in 1991.
- October 8 – Despite finishing in second, their lowest finish in his 3 1/2 years as manager, the Boston Red Sox dismiss Joe Morgan and replace him with Butch Hobson. Morgan is the tenth manager fired in 1991.
- October 9 – Tom Trebelhorn becomes the eleventh managerial casualty of 1991 despite a record of 40-19 and a finish over .500 with the Milwaukee Brewers.
- October 10:
  - The New York Mets hire Jeff Torborg as their new manager, replacing Bud Harrelson.
  - The Seattle Mariners fire Jim Lefebvre, the twelfth firing of 1991.
- October 18 – Jim Essian, who replaced Don Zimmer in May, is fired as manager of the Chicago Cubs, the thirteenth and last firing of a manager in 1991. The thirteen firings in a season set a major league record that still stands.
- October 27 – The Minnesota Twins become the 1991 World Series champions with a 1–0 victory behind Jack Morris' masterful 10-inning shutout. Gene Larkin's single off Atlanta Braves reliever Alejandro Peña scores Dan Gladden with the game's only run. The game is the first Game Seven to go into extra innings since the 1924 World Series between the Washington Senators and New York Giants. Morris is named the Series MVP for the Twins, who wins all four games at home while losing all three in Atlanta. Four of the seven games are decided on the final pitch, while five are decided by a single run, and three in extra innings. All are Series records.
- October 29 - The New York Yankees announce that Buck Showalter has been promoted to replace Stump Merrill as manager.

=== November ===
- November 15 – Gary Carter returns to the Montreal Expos when they claim him off waivers from the Los Angeles Dodgers.
- November 18 – Bobby Bonilla leaves the Pittsburgh Pirates for the New York Mets and becomes the first five-million dollar a year player in Major League Baseball history.
- November 19 – Baltimore Orioles' Cal Ripken Jr. was named the American League MVP, thus became the first player to win the All-Star Home Run Derby, the All-Star Game MVP and the AL MVP in the same season.
- November 20:
  - Mike Scott of the Houston Astros announces his retirement from baseball.
  - Terry Pendelton who led the Atlanta Braves to a World Series appearance was named the National League MVP.
- November 25 – The Montreal Expos trade first baseman Andrés Galarraga to the St. Louis Cardinals for starting pitcher Ken Hill. Galarraga struggles for St. Louis before enjoying a career renaissance with the Colorado Rockies in 1993.

=== December ===
- December 1 – The Major League Baseball Players Association announces that the average player salary is $851,492, a 42.5% increase from 1990.
- December 19:
  - Steve Howe of the New York Yankees is arrested near his Montana home for felony cocaine possession. The charge was later amended to misdemeanor attempted possession of a dangerous drug, and he pled not guilty in February 1992.
  - Dave Winfield signs with the Toronto Blue Jays as a free agent.

== Movies ==
- Pastime
- Talent for the Game

== Births ==
=== January ===
- January 4 – Daniel Stumpf
- January 6 – Kevin Gausman
- January 6 – Keyvius Sampson
- January 7 – Tucker Barnhart
- January 8 – Carlos Contreras
- January 9 – Tayron Guerrero
- January 10 – Drew Steckenrider
- January 12 – Alex Wood
- January 13 – Hoby Milner
- January 14 – Aaron Altherr
- January 14 – Stephen Piscotty
- January 14 – Todd Van Steensel
- January 15 – Matt Duffy
- January 15 – Mitch Garver
- January 17 – Trevor Bauer
- January 18 – Kyle Martin
- January 18 – Alex Mejia
- January 23 – Daniel Fields
- January 24 – Tony Renda
- January 24 – Enny Romero
- January 24 – Tyler Wagner
- January 27 – Julio Teherán
- January 31 – Guillermo Heredia
- January 31 – Tyler Kinley

=== February ===
- February 1 – Darnell Sweeney
- February 2 – Matt Boyd
- February 6 – Chad Girodo
- February 6 – Luke Maile
- February 9 – Aly González
- February 11 – Luis Santos
- February 12 – Reymond Fuentes
- February 13 – Luke Voit
- February 20 – Buck Farmer
- February 21 – Devon Travis
- February 22 – Tim Peterson
- February 24 – Yefri Pérez
- February 26 – Kevin Plawecki

=== March ===
- March 1 – Joe Mantiply
- March 1 – Robert Suárez
- March 2 – Nick Franklin
- March 7 – Justin Topa
- March 13 – Manny Banuelos
- March 13 – Eddie Butler
- March 13 – Mark Leiter Jr.
- March 15 – Richie Shaffer
- March 15 – Max Stassi
- March 15 – Trayce Thompson
- March 16 – Spencer Kieboom
- March 16 – Cory Spangenberg
- March 18 – Leury García
- March 18 – J. T. Realmuto
- March 19 – Tommy Nance
- March 25 – Mike Zunino
- March 26 – Matt Davidson
- March 26 – Hernán Pérez
- March 26 – Rob Refsnyder
- March 26 – Michael Taylor
- March 28 – Christian Walker
- March 29 – Pat Light
- March 30 – Jake Marisnick

=== April ===
- April 1 – César Puello
- April 2 – Dakota Bacus
- April 3 – Kevin Herget
- April 3 – Tom Murphy
- April 3 – Daniel Wright
- April 4 – Martín Pérez
- April 5 – Seth Mejias-Brean
- April 16 – Nolan Arenado
- April 16 – Paco Rodriguez
- April 19 – Bryan Mitchell
- April 20 – Garin Cecchini
- April 24 – Tyler Naquin
- April 24 – Carlos Ramírez
- April 29 – Jacob Hannemann

=== May ===
- May 1 – Marcus Stroman
- May 1 – Zach Vincej
- May 2 – Jonathan Villar
- May 3 – Mike Morin
- May 5 – Austin Adams
- May 5 – James Pazos
- May 7 – Emilio Pagan
- May 8 – Cody Ege
- May 9 – Oswaldo Arcia
- May 9 – Ian Krol
- May 10 – Pierce Johnson
- May 13 – Austin Maddox
- May 13 – John Ryan Murphy
- May 15 – Rafael Ortega
- May 16 – Dietrich Enns
- May 18 – Giovanni Soto
- May 19 – Ji-man Choi
- May 21 – Joe Hudson
- May 21 – Williams Pérez
- May 21 – Joey Rickard
- May 21 – Jacob Turner
- May 24 – Chad Green
- May 24 – Damien Magnifico
- May 24 – Mitch Nilsson
- May 27 – Jairo Díaz
- May 29 – Steven Matz
- May 29 – Nick Wittgren
- May 31 – Matt Bowman

=== June ===
- June 3 – Yordano Ventura
- June 5 – Andrew Heaney
- June 6 – Nolan Fontana
- June 7 – Luke Farrell
- June 8 – R. J. Alvarez
- June 8 – Terrance Gore
- June 12 – Avisail García
- June 14 – R. J. Alaniz
- June 15 – Travis Jankowski
- June 16 – Justin Haley
- June 17 – Yusei Kikuchi
- June 18 – Tomas Telis
- June 19 – Tyler Heineman
- June 19 – Christian Villanueva
- June 20 – Rymer Liriano
- June 20 – Jaime Schultz
- June 21 – Jefry Marté

=== July ===
- July 1 – Tyler Smith
- July 1 – Michael Wacha
- July 2 – Troy Scribner
- July 5 – Felipe Vázquez
- July 6 – Nick Goody
- July 9 – Steven Okert
- July 13 – Tyler Skaggs
- July 15 – Mark Appel
- July 15 – Elvis Araújo
- July 16 – Tommy Joseph
- July 16 – Ildemaro Vargas
- July 18 – Eugenio Suárez
- July 19 – David Holmberg
- July 21 – Taylor Williams
- July 22 – Jake Barrett
- July 23 – Matt Carasiti
- July 26 – Cristhian Adames
- July 26 – Brandon Brennan
- July 26 – Ryne Stanek
- July 27 – Wandy Peralta
- July 28 – Caleb Smith

=== August ===
- August 2 – Parker Bridwell
- August 4 – Jason Adam
- August 4 – Domingo Tapia
- August 5 – Andrew Bellatti
- August 5 – Ben Heller
- August 6 – Wilmer Flores
- August 7 – Mike Trout
- August 8 – Yandy Díaz
- August 9 – Steven Moya
- August 11 – Wilfredo Tovar
- August 12 – Chris Owings
- August 13 – Randal Grichuk
- August 14 – Dylan Covey
- August 14 – Giovanny Gallegos
- August 15 – Jon Moscot
- August 17 – Dillon Overton
- August 21 – Mason Williams
- August 22 – Hunter Dozier
- August 24 – Enrique Hernández
- August 24 – Luke Jackson
- August 27 – Patrick Wisdom
- August 30 – Shane Carle
- August 31 – Erik González

=== September ===
- September 2 – Christian Bethancourt
- September 3 – Carl Edwards Jr.
- September 4 – Kyle Finnegan
- September 5 – Michael Peoples
- September 6 – Tyler Austin
- September 6 – Nick Rumbelow
- September 12 – José Ureña
- September 13 – Zach Lee
- September 13 – Kyle Zimmer
- September 14 – Gregory Polanco
- September 15 – Wander Suero
- September 18 – Jon Singleton
- September 21 – Carlos Martínez
- September 24 – Michael Ynoa
- September 25 – Kyle Ryan
- September 25 – Eric Stamets
- September 26 – Miguel Aguilar
- September 28 – Eddie Rosario
- September 29 – Branden Kline

=== October ===
- October 1 – Robbie Ray
- October 1 – Connor Sadzeck
- October 1 – Lou Trivino
- October 2 – Cam Bedrosian
- October 2 – Noel Cuevas
- October 2 – Jason Hursh
- October 3 – Adam Plutko
- October 3 – Brock Stewart
- October 4 – Alec Asher
- October 6 – Raynel Espinal
- October 6 – Matt Wotherspoon
- October 7 – Mike Foltynewicz
- October 7 – Adrian Sampson
- October 9 – Ryan Brett
- October 11 – Gio Urshela
- October 12 – J. T. Riddle
- October 14 – Willians Astudillo
- October 14 – Julian Merryweather
- October 14 – Brad Wieck
- October 16 – Edgar Santana
- October 16 – Jonathan Schoop
- October 18 – Kevin McGowan
- October 19 – Jimmy Cordero
- October 22 – Barrett Astin
- October 22 – Jesse Biddle
- October 24 – Tanner Banks
- October 26 – Dominic Leone
- October 28 – Daniel Palka
- October 29 – Arismendy Alcántara
- October 31 – Tony Kemp

=== November ===
- November 2 – Carlos Asuaje
- November 4 – Chad Wallach
- November 5 – Jon Gray
- November 8 – Nick Kingham
- November 9 – Andrew Knapp
- November 12 – Matt Strahm
- November 13 – Logan Wade
- November 14 – Joely Rodríguez
- November 15 – Trevor Brown
- November 16 – Phillips Valdez
- November 18 – Jameson Taillon
- November 22 – Justin Nicolino
- November 23 – Hotaka Yamakawa
- November 24 – Kendry Flores
- November 26 – Corey Knebel
- November 26 – Yoshi Tsutsugo
- November 26 – Kyle Waldrop
- November 27 – Kyle McGowin
- November 30 – Alec Mills

=== December ===
- December 1 – Yhonathan Barrios
- December 3 – Konner Wade
- December 5 – Christian Yelich
- December 6 – Mike Mayers
- December 7 – Mark Payton
- December 9 – Adam Engel
- December 14 – Adam Frazier
- December 15 – Kyle Crockett
- December 15 – Ryan Eades
- December 26 – Kōhei Morihara
- December 27 – Jimmie Sherfy
- December 27 – Stuart Turner
- December 28 – Myles Jaye
- December 29 – Odubel Herrera
- December 30 – César Vargas
- December 31 – Kevin Kaczmarski
- December 31 – Ryan Yarbrough

== Deaths ==
=== January ===
- January 3 – Tom Baker, 77, pitcher who played from 1935 through 1938 with the Brooklyn Dodgers and New York Giants.
- January 3 – Luke Appling, 83, Hall of Fame shortstop who played his entire career (1930 to 1950) for the Chicago White Sox, setting career record for most games at his position while batting a .310 average and 2,749 hits lifetime while winning two American League batting titles; famous for his ability to foul off pitches, he retired with the seventh-most walks in MLB history (1,302), although brief World War II service may have deprived him of a chance to reach 3,000 hits; coached for six MLB teams over ten seasons spanning 1960 to 1984; acting manager of Athletics for last 40 games of 1967 season and last skipper in team's history in Kansas City.
- January 4 – Bill Byrd, 83, seven-time All-Star pitcher for the Baltimore Elite Giants of the Negro leagues, who was among the last hurlers to throw the spitball.
- January 4 – Tommy Harris, 67, catcher for the 1946–1948 Cleveland Buckeyes of the Negro American League.
- January 4 – Eric Rodin, 60, backup outfielder for the 1954 New York Giants.
- January 5 – Tommie Dukes, 84, catcher who had a long career in the Negro and Mexican leagues between 1928 and 1945, notably as a member of the Homestead Grays and Nashville Elite Giants; selected an All-Star in 1933.
- January 6 – Bobby Estalella, 79, Cuban outfielder for the Washington Senators, St. Louis Browns and Philadelphia Athletics in nine seasons spanning 1935–1949, who drew a three-year suspension for trying to jump to the Mexican League in 1946.
- January 6 – Alan Wiggins, 32, speedy second baseman for the San Diego Padres and the Baltimore Orioles from 1981 to 1987, who batted .341 in the 1984 postseason.
- January 15 – Lyle Judy, 77, second baseman who played briefly for the St. Louis Cardinals in 1935.
- January 17 – Marv Breuer, 76, pitcher who played from 1939 to 1943 with the New York Yankees, and also a member of the 1941 World Series champion team.
- January 18 – Herb Harris, 77, pitcher for the 1936 Philadelphia Phillies.
- January 19 – Roy Weatherly, 75, center fielder who played with the Cleveland Indians, New York Yankees and New York Giants in all or part of ten seasons spanning 1936–1950, and a member of the 1943 American League champion Yankees.
- January 25 – Hoot Evers, 69, two-time All-Star outfielder for the Detroit Tigers who led the American League in triples in 1950; also played for Boston Red Sox, New York Giants, Cleveland Indians and Baltimore Orioles; longtime executive with Tigers and Indians.
- January 27 – Dale Long, 64, All-Star first baseman (1956) who set an MLB record by hitting home runs in eight consecutive games for the 1956 Pittsburgh Pirates; played with six teams over ten seasons between 1950 and 1963, winning World Series ring with 1962 Yankees; also played parts of two 1958 games as a rare, left-handed-throwing catcher.

=== February ===
- February 3 – Walter Brown, 75, pitcher for the St. Louis Browns in 1947.
- February 6 – Alex McColl, 96, pitcher who made his MLB debut at age 39 with the Washington Senators in 1933 and 1934; hurled for 26 years in the minors.
- February 7 – George Detore, 84, backup infielder for the Cleveland Indians from 1930 to 1931, who later spent more than five decades as a minor league player-manager, as well as scouting for the Pittsburgh Pirates from 1955 to 1986, interrupted by a stint as a coach for 1959 Buccos.
- February 15 – Julio González, 70, Cuban pitcher for the 1949 Washington Senators.
- February 20 – John Fetzer, 89, Michigan-based broadcasting tycoon; co-owner of the Detroit Tigers from October 1956 to December 1960; thereafter, sole owner of the Tigers until 1983.
- February 22 – Joe Craig, 72, leftfielder for the 1945–1946 Philadelphia Stars of the Negro National League.
- February 22 – Jimmy Pattison, 82, pitcher for the Brooklyn Robins in the 1929 season.
- February 24 – Joe Munson, 90, outfielder who played from 1925 to 1926 for the Chicago Cubs.
- February 26 – Jimmy Zinn, 96, pitcher for the Philadelphia Athletics, Pittsburgh Pirates and Cleveland Indians in four seasons between 1919 and 1929, who also played or managed in the minors during 23 seasons spanning 1915–1939.
- February 27 – Clarence Griffin, 79, outfielder for three Negro National League clubs over three seasons (1933–1935).

=== March ===
- March 1 – Ken Smith, 89, sportswriter who covered the New York Giants from 1925 until the team moved to San Francisco in 1958, who also served as director of the Baseball Hall of Fame and Museum from 1963 to 1979.
- March 4 – Gready McKinnis, 77, left-hander who hurled for the Birmingham Black Barons, Kansas City Monarchs and Chicago American Giants between 1941 and 1945.
- March 7 – Cool Papa Bell, 87, Hall of Fame center fielder of the Negro leagues, prominently with the St. Louis Stars, who was legendary for his speed on the bases.
- March 9 – Jim Hardin, 47, pitcher who won 18 games for the Baltimore Orioles in 1968, and a member of their 1970 World Series champs; appeared in 164 games over his six-year (1967–1972) career for the Orioles, New York Yankees and Atlanta Braves.
- March 30 – Sid Schacht, 73, relief pitcher for the St. Louis Browns and Boston Braves in two seasons from 1950 to 1951.

=== April ===
- April 1 – Frankie Gustine, 73, three-time All-Star infielder who played for the Pittsburgh Pirates from 1939 through 1948, primarily at second base (1940–1942; 1946), shortstop (1943–1945), and at third base (1947–1948); hit a career high .297 in 1947, while leading all National League players in games played and all third basemen in putouts and assists.
- April 3 – Whitey Miller, 75, pitcher for the New York Giants in 1944, and one of many players who only appeared in the majors during World War II.
- April 3 – John Mullen, 66, general manager of the Atlanta Braves from May 1979 through 1985, who began working with the franchise when it was still based in Boston.
- April 4 – Johnny Moore, 89, outfielder for the Chicago Cubs, Cincinnati Reds and Philadelphia Phillies in parts of 10 seasons spanning 1928–1945, who collected a solid .307 average with 73 home runs and 452 RBIs in 846 games played.
- April 10 – Sammy Holbrook, 80, backup catcher for the Washington Senators in 1935.
- April 11 – Walker Cooper, 76, nine-time All-Star catcher for six National League teams over 18 seasons; batted .285 lifetime, including five seasons hitting .300 or better; two-time World Series champion (1942, 1944) and NL MVP runner-up (1943) as member of St. Louis Cardinals; younger brother and battery mate of stalwart hurler Mort Cooper.
- April 12 – Gene Lillard, 77, pitcher/infielder who played with the Chicago Cubs in 1936 and 1939 and for the St. Louis Cardinals in 1940, and also a player or manager in 19 minor league seasons between 1936 and 1954, in which he led the Pacific Coast League in home runs in 1933 (43) and 1935 (56), and the Arizona–Texas League in batting average (.364) in 1948.
- April 16 – Al Verdel, 69, pitcher who played briefly for the Philadelphia Phillies during the 1944 season.
- April 17 – Les Mallon, 85, infielder/outfielder who hit a .283 average in 383 games for the Philadelphia Phillies and Boston Braves between 1931 and 1935.
- April 18 – Sheldon Jones, 69, durable pitcher, nicknamed "Available", who posted a 54–57 record and a 3.96 ERA in 260 games for the New York Giants, Boston Braves and Chicago Cubs between 1946 and 1953.
- April 20 – Bucky Walters, 82, converted infielder who became a six-time National League All-Star pitcher, as well as a Triple Crown and MVP winner in 1939, whose 198 career victories included three 20-win seasons for the Cincinnati Reds; led Cincinnati to the 1940 World Series championship over the Detroit Tigers with a 2–0 record and a 2.38 ERA in two complete games, including a shutout and hitting a home run in Game 5, to join Jesse Haines (1926) as the only pitchers to accomplish the feat in Series history; managed Reds from August 6, 1948 to September 27, 1949.
- April 21 – Dick Weik, 63, relief pitcher who played for the Washington Senators, Cleveland Indians and Detroit Tigers during five seasons between 1948 and 1954.
- April 26 – Nate Andrews, 77, National League All-Star pitcher who played with the St. Louis Cardinals, Cleveland Indians, Boston Braves, Cincinnati Reds and New York Giants in eight seasons between 1937 and 1946.

=== May ===
- May 3 – Frank Leja, 55, "bonus baby" first baseman who played in 26 games over three seasons for the New York Yankees (1954–1955) and Los Angeles Angels (1962).
- May 4 – Bill Macdonald, 62, pitcher who played for the Pittsburgh Pirates in the 1950 and 1953 seasons.
- May 8 – Cedric Tallis, 76, front-office executive with the Los Angeles/California Angels, Kansas City Royals and New York Yankees between 1961 and 1982; first general manager in Royals' history (1968–1974), later GM of the 1978–1979 Yankees.
- May 9 – Mary Reynolds, 90, All-Star player/manager in the All-American Girls Professional Baseball League.
- May 13 – Hal Gregg, 69, All-Star pitcher for the Brooklyn Dodgers, Pittsburgh Pirates and New York Giants from 1943 to 1952, who was the winning pitcher during the historic debut of Jackie Robinson in 1947.
- May 15 – Ken Jones, 88, pitcher for the 1924 Detroit Tigers and the 1930 Boston Braves.
- May 20 – Pete Runnels, 63, three-time All-Star infielder who played with the Washington Senators, Boston Red Sox and Houston Colt .45s from 1951 to 1964, and a two-time American League batting champion while playing for Boston in 1960 (.320) and 1962 (.326); coached for Red Sox in 1965–1966, and served as interim manager from September 9 to the end of the 1966 season.
- May 24 – Pat Scantlebury, 73, Panamanian pitcher for the 1956 Cincinnati Redlegs, who was mostly known for his time in the Negro leagues when he was considered Panama's first Professional baseball star on foreign soil.
- May 25 – Esther Lyman, 64, All-American Girls Professional Baseball League player.
- May 28 – Roy Cullenbine, 77, outfielder from 1938 to 1947 for the Detroit Tigers, Brooklyn Dodgers, St. Louis Browns, Washington Senators, New York Yankees and Cleveland Indians; a two-time All-Star in 1941 and 1944 and member of the 1945 World Series champion Tigers, who collected almost as many walks (853) as he did hits (1,072), ending with a .276 average and a .408 on-base percentage in a ten-season career, while ranking among the American League leaders in walks for seven consecutive seasons from 1941 through 1947.
- May 30 – Jim Magnuson, 44, pitcher who played in parts of three seasons for the Chicago White Sox (1970–1971) and the New York Yankees (1973).

=== June ===
- June 5 – Luis Suárez, 74, Cuban third baseman who played briefly for the Washington Senators during the 1944 season.
- June 11 – Goldie Holt, 89, minor league infielder and manager who served in MLB as a coach for the 1948–1950 Pittsburgh Pirates and 1961–1965 Chicago Cubs; longtime scout for Dodgers in both Brooklyn and Los Angeles.
- June 15 – Happy Chandler, 92, Hall of Fame executive who left the U.S. Senate to serve as the second Commissioner of Baseball (1945–1951) and presided over the integration of the major leagues.
- June 16 – Lanny Harris, 51, National League umpire from 1979 to 1985 who worked in 851 league games.
- June 19 – Pete Rambo, 84, pitcher for the 1926 Philadelphia Phillies.
- June 20 – Frank Umont, 73, ex-NFL lineman turned umpire who worked 3,147 American League games from 1954 to 1973, along with four World Series and four All-Star games.
- June 21 – Harry Wilke, 90, backup third baseman who played for the Chicago Cubs in 1927.
- June 22 – Marv Owen, 85, third baseman for the Detroit Tigers, Chicago White Sox, and Boston Red Sox from 1931 through 1940, who was part of the hard-hitting Tigers infield that included Hank Greenberg (1B), Charlie Gehringer (2B) and Billy Rogell (SS).
- June 24 – Bud Swartz, 62, relief pitcher for the 1947 St. Louis Browns of the American League.
- June 26 – Johnny Johnson, 76, pitcher who played from 1944 to 1945 with the New York Yankees and Chicago White Sox.
- June 27 – Charlie Humber, 77, second baseman for the 1943 Baltimore Elite Giants and 1945 Newark Eagles of the Negro National League.

=== July ===
- July 2 – Al Glossop, 76, second baseman who played for the New York Giants, Boston Bees, Philadelphia Phillies, Brooklyn Dodgers and Chicago Cubs in parts of five seasons spanning 1939–1946.
- July 15 – Johnny Vergez, 85, third baseman from 1931 through 1936 for the New York Giants, Philadelphia Phillies and St. Louis Cardinals, and a member of the 1933 world champion Giants; later, longtime baseball coach at his alma mater, Saint Mary's College of California.
- July 22 – Jack Albright, 70, shortstop for the 1947 Philadelphia Phillies.
- July 24 – Howie Carter, 86, backup infielder for the Cincinnati Reds during the 1926 season.
- July 30 – Allen Conkwright, 94, pitcher for the 1920 Detroit Tigers.
- July 31 – John Dobb, 89, pitcher for the Chicago White Sox in the 1924 season.

=== August ===
- August 1 – Chris Short, 53, two-time All-Star pitcher who played from 1959 through 1973 for the Philadelphia Phillies and Milwaukee Brewers, while posting a 135–132 record with a 3.43 ERA and 1,629 strikeouts in 501 pitching appearances.
- August 4 – Sammy White, 64, 1953 All-Star catcher for the Boston Red Sox, who became the only 20th-century player to score three runs in one inning (1953), caught Mel Parnell's no-hitter (1956), and broke up Bob Feller's no-hit bid with a 7th inning single (1955).
- August 7 – Jimmy Cooney, 96, shortstop for the Boston Red Sox, New York Giants, St. Louis Cardinals, Chicago Cubs, Philadelphia Phillies and Boston Braves between 1917 and 1928, who turned an unassisted triple play in 1927; son and brother of major-leaguers.
- August 9 – Hank Majeski, 74, third baseman for seven teams in 13 seasons from 1939 to 1955 and a member of the 1954 American League champion Cleveland Indians, who set an American League record at his position with a .989 fielding percentage while playing for the 1947 Philadelphia Athletics.
- August 12 – Chick Starr, 80, backup catcher for the Washington Senators in 1935 and 1936.
- August 24 – Tony Martínez, 51, Cuban-born shortstop who played from 1963 through 1966 for the Cleveland Indians; 1962 International League MVP.

=== September ===
- September 5 – Loyd Christopher, 71, outfielder who played with the Boston Red Sox and Chicago Cubs in 1945 and the Chicago White Sox in 1947; brother of pitcher Russ Christopher.
- September 8 – Clem Koshorek, 66, backup infielder for the Pittsburgh Pirates in 1952 and 1953.
- September 8 – Lou Rosenberg, 87, second baseman/shortstop for the 1923 Chicago White Sox.
- September 9 – Les Rock, 79, first baseman who played for the Chicago White Sox in 1936.
- September 11 – Lois Florreich, 64, AAGPBL pitcher who set an American all-time season record for lowest earned run average with a 0.67 mark.
- September 15 – André Baruch, 83, New York City radio personality who spent two seasons (1954–1955) as successor to Red Barber on Brooklyn Dodgers' broadcast team.
- September 15 – Smoky Burgess, 64, six-time All-Star catcher and a member of the 1960 World Series Champion Pittsburgh Pirates, who started his career with the Chicago Cubs in 1949 and also saw action with the Philadelphia Phillies, Cincinnati Redlegs and Chicago White Sox through 1967, hitting .295 with 126 home runs and 673 RBIs, while leading National League catchers in fielding percentage three times and setting a Major League record of 145 career pinch-hits, a mark broken by Manny Mota in 1979.
- September 20 – Chet Morgan, 81, center fielder who played in 88 career games for the 1935 and 1938 Detroit Tigers.
- September 20 – Steve Peek, 77, pitcher who posted a 4–2 record in 17 games for the 1941 World Series Champion New York Yankees in his only major league season.
- September 25 – Bob Prichard, 73, served as a backup for first baseman Mickey Vernon for the 1939 Washington Senators.
- September 29 – Ed Moriarty, 78, second baseman who played from 1935 to 1936 for the Boston Braves and the Boston Bees.

=== October ===
- October 2 – William Shea, 84, partner of the prominent law firm of Shea & Gould and founder of the Continental League, which was instrumental in bringing National League baseball back to New York City with the New York Mets, as well as the man for whom Shea Stadium was named.
- October 7 – Leo Durocher, 86, colorful, combative Hall of Fame manager who led the Brooklyn Dodgers to their first pennant in 21 years in 1941 and drove the New York Giants to two NL pennants and an unexpected four-game sweep of the Cleveland Indians in the 1954 World Series; managed Dodgers (1939–1946, 1948), Giants (1948–1955), Chicago Cubs (1966–1972) and Houston Astros (1972–1973), although suspended for entire 1947 season for "conduct detrimental to baseball"; retired with 2,008 victories for the second most in National League history; previously an All-Star shortstop (1936 and 1938) and captain of the historic 1934 St. Louis Cardinals Gashouse Gang; known as a stellar defender but "the All-American out" (nicknamed by Babe Ruth) at the plate during his playing career, batting .247 in 1,637 games over 17 seasons between 1925 and 1945; between managing jobs, a Dodgers' coach (1961–1964) and "color man" on Game of the Week telecasts on both NBC and ABC.
- October 8 – Ed Hanyzewski, 71, pitcher who played 58 games from 1942 through 1946 for the Chicago Cubs.
- October 9 – Charlie Moss, 80, pitcher who played for the Philadelphia Athletics from 1934 to 1936.
- October 11 – Clay Kirby, 43, pitcher for the San Diego Padres, Cincinnati Reds and Montreal Expos in eight seasons from 1969 to 1976, who posted a 10–6 record in 19 starts in 1975, helping lead the Big Red Machine to the National League pennant and its eventual World Series title.
- October 21 – Bobby Coombs, 83, relief pitcher for the 1933 Philadelphia Athletics and the 1943 New York Giants.
- October 21 – Jim Hamby, 94, catcher for the New York Giants in parts of the 1926 and 1927 seasons, who also had a solid 10-season career in the minors from 1922 to 1933.
- October 25 – Joe Bokina, 81, pitcher for the 1936 Washington Senators.
- October 25 – George Brunet, 56, durable and reliable pitcher who played either in the major or minor leagues every season from 1953 through 1985, which includes 15 major league seasons for ten teams from 1956 through 1971, while setting an all-time minor league record with 3,175 strikeouts and the Mexican League career record for shutouts with 55.
- October 26 – Bill Bevens, 75, pitcher for the New York Yankees from 1944 to 1947 and also part of the 1947 World Series champion Yankees; famously took a no-hit game into the ninth inning of Game 4 of that Fall Classic, before surrendering a two-out double to Cookie Lavagetto and losing the contest, 3–2.
- October 29 – Jimmie Coker, 55, solid backup catcher who played with the Philadelphia Phillies, San Francisco Giants and Cincinnati Reds in parts of ten seasons spanning 1958–1967.
- October 31 – Dixie Parsons, 75, catcher who played for the Detroit Tigers in 1939 and from 1942 to 1943.

=== November ===
- November 11 – Heinz Becker, 75, German-born first baseman who was a key reserve on the Chicago Cubs team that won the 1945 National League pennant.
- November 11 – Collins Jones, 67, who appeared for three Negro leagues clubs in three seasons (1943, 1945–1946), primarily as a shortstop.
- November 11 – Cananea Reyes, 54, legendary longtime manager in Mexican League, where he won five championships over 20 years; third base coach of MLB's Seattle Mariners in 1981.
- November 15 – Jack Franklin, 72, pitcher who played briefly for the Brooklyn Dodgers during the 1944 season.
- November 17 – Smead Jolley, 89, outfielder for the Chicago White Sox and the Boston Red Sox from 1930 to 1933, twice batting batted over .300 and twice driving in 100 runs in his four MLB seasons; later enjoyed a successful career in the minor leagues, where he amassed a .366 average and 278 home runs in 14 seasons, most of them for the Oakland Oaks and San Francisco Seals.
- November 21 – Bryan Stephens, 71, pitcher who played from 1947 to 1948 with the Cleveland Indians and St. Louis Browns.
- November 22 – Roy Zimmerman, 75, first baseman for the 1945 New York Giants, and one of several ballplayers who only appeared in the majors during World War II.
- November 24 – Carl Sawatski, 64, catcher and pinch hitter for the Chicago Cubs, Chicago White Sox, Milwaukee Braves, Philadelphia Phillies and St. Louis Cardinals between 1954 and 1963, who helped the Braves win the 1957 World Series and the 1958 National League pennant; longtime and influential minor-league executive.
- November 28 – Stan Wentzel, 74, center fielder who played with the Boston Braves in 1945.

=== December ===
- December 1 – Buster Mills, 83, outfielder for the St. Louis Cardinals, Brooklyn Dodgers, Boston Red Sox, St. Louis Browns, New York Yankees and Cleveland Indians in a span of seven seasons from 1934 to 1946, then became a coach for seven seasons through 1954; interim manager of 1953 Cincinnati Redlegs as a replacement for Rogers Hornsby, who had resigned before the season ended.
- December 4 – Dan McGee, 80, backup shortstop for the 1934 Boston Braves.
- December 4 – Herb Thomas, 90, outfielder/infielder in 74 games for the Boston Braves and the New York Giants between 1924 and 1927, and a minor league player or manager in a 19-season career from 1922 to 1946, who also served in both World War I and World War II.
- December 7 – Jute Bell, 91, Negro league baseball pitcher from 1923 through 1931, and later a long-time basketball coach at Knoxville College who led the Bulldogs to Southern Intercollegiate Athletic Conference tournament championships in 1956 and 1958.
- December 10 – Ed Murphy, 73, first baseman who played for the Philadelphia Phillies during the 1942 season.
- December 11 – Dick Kelley, 51, southpaw pitcher who got into 188 games for the Milwaukee/Atlanta Braves (1964–1968) and San Diego Padres (1969, 1971).
- December 12 – Ken Keltner, 75, seven-time All-Star third baseman who played for the Cleveland Indians and the Boston Red Sox during 13 seasons from 1937 to 1950, whose two impressive, backhanded defensive plays prevented Joe DiMaggio from extending his 56-game hitting streak.
- December 14 – Larry Ciaffone, 67, outfielder for the 1951 St. Louis Cardinals, also a war veteran who saw combat at the Battle of the Bulge in 1944–1945.
- December 14 – J. C. Hamilton, 78, southpaw pitcher and occasional outfielder for the 1940–1942 Homestead Grays of the Negro National League.
- December 17 – Jesse Flores, 77, pitcher for the Chicago Cubs and Philadelphia Athletics from 1942 to 1947 and the Cleveland Indians in 1950, who later became a long-time scout for the Minnesota Twins, credited with signing future Hall of Fame pitcher Bert Blyleven to his first contract.
- December 19 – Pearley Johnson, 86, outfielder for the Baltimore Black Sox (1926–1927) and Baltimore Sox (1933); led Eastern Colored League in stolen bases (24) in 1927.
- December 20 – Hal Finney, 86, backup catcher for the Pittsburgh Pirates in part of five seasons spanning 1931–1936.
- December 20 – Don Williams, 56, pitcher who played briefly for the Minnesota Twins in the 1963 season.
