= FWP =

FWP may refer to:

- Federal Writers' Project
- Fort Wayne Pistons, a basketball team
- Freshwater Place, Melbourne, Australia
- Montana Department of Fish, Wildlife and Parks
- First World problem
- "F.W.P." (Fuck White People), a song by AJJ from Candy Cigarettes & Cap Guns
