= Red Tank! =

American punk band

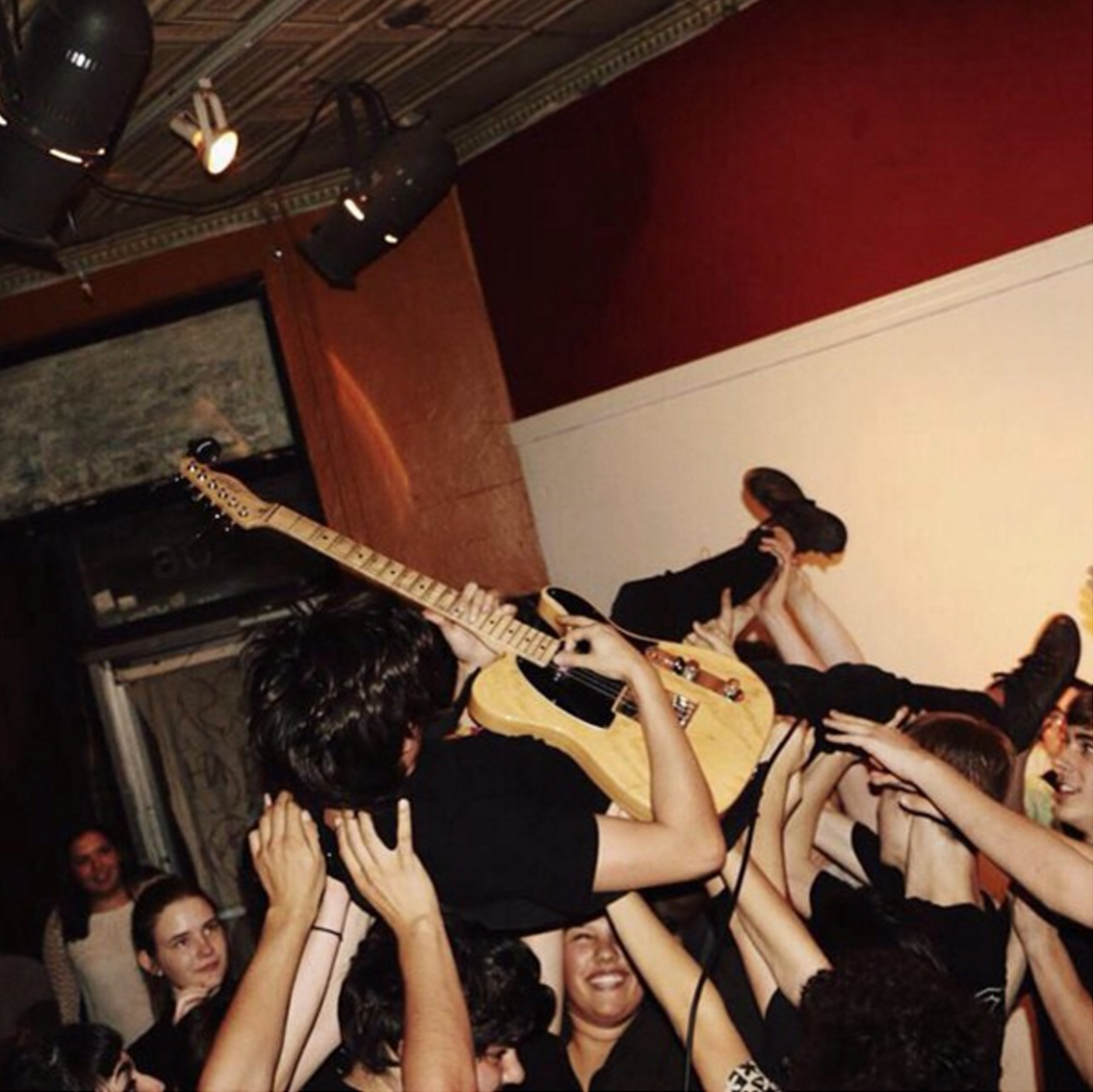
- Red Tank! performing live at The Trunk Space in Phoenix, Arizona.

Background information
- Origin: Phoenix, AZ
- Genres: Punk rock; garage punk; post-punk; noise rock; indie rock; punk blues; art punk
- Years active: 2010 - present
- Members: Clipper Arnold; Jon Mann
- Past members: Nick Brooks; Matt Belen; Sam Russo; Erik Naranjo; Jeff Habgood

Red Tank! is an American punk band from Phoenix, Arizona, United States that is currently based in Brooklyn, New York. They are known for their erratic sound and "high energy" performances which propel introspective, complex lyricism. They have been described as "caffeinated [punk]... perfect for wrecking a living room: a combination of soaring scream-alongs and ecstatic existential anthems."

== History ==
They have recorded with Jalipaz Nelson of Audioconfusion, who has worked with other Phoenix bands such as AJJ, Playboy Manbaby, Dogbreth, and Diners. The band refers to him as a "legend and a mentor".

Red Tank! have been compared to "the snottier sides of No Age, Ty Segall, and Harlem".

Red Tank! initially formed in 2010 as a side-project of band leader Clipper Arnold. They began releasing music and playing locally in earnest in 2011. Red Tank! also incorporated a new lineup in 2014.

They have done both shorter and more extensive West Coast touring in January 2015, as well as July 2015, and December 2015 through January 2016. They have also performed during the SXSW music festival in Austin, Texas twice, once in March 2015 and again in 2016.

On July 8, Red Tank! set out on their third full West Coast tour in support of their new album, "BIO/FEEDBACK". They embarked on their fourth full West Coast tour on December 7.

The band did an East Coast tour in July and August 2017 and have stated they are working on a new record.

Red Tank! self-released their "Things Fall Apart" single in August 2017 and their "X" EP in September 2017. They released a single called "Chains" in 2020, and a cover of Les Rallizes Dénudés' "Night of the Assassins" in 2021. They also released a remastered version of their first record "Squalor in the Year of Black Magic" in June 2021.

"Dreams & Monsters" was released by Red Tank! in March 2022. It's their first full-length release since 2016's "Bio/Feedback", excluding the "Squalor" remaster. According to the release notes, "[i]t’s a record largely inspired by the latent fantasy and horror in the political imagination -- and the path to a new world as a process of constant becoming." It was recorded at Kingsize Soundlabs, Rec Center (a DIY venue in Los Angeles), and home studios.

== Discography ==
=== Studio albums ===
- Squalor in the Year of Black Magic (2013, Self-Released, Rubber Brother Records)
- I Want You to Crowdsurf My Body at My Funeral (2015, Self-Released, Rubber Brother Records)
- Bio/Feedback (2016, Self-Released, Arena.com)
- Squalor in the Year of Black Magic (REDUX) (2021, Self-Released, Godless America Records). A remixed/remastered version of the band's first record.
- Dreams & Monsters (2022, Self-Released, Godless America Records)

=== EPs, splits and compilations ===
- Red Tank! EP (2011, Self-Released)
- Nerf War a split with Leonardo Dicapricorn (2014, Rubber Brother Records)
- Appears on Godless America Records Mixtape Vol. 2 (2016, Godless America Records)
- X (2017, Self-Released, Warped Your Records)
- Appears on Audioconfusion: Sampler 4 (2018, Audioconfusion)
- Appears on Comp For A Cause (2020, The Trunk Space)
- Do You Want Shoegaze or Do You Want the Truth? (2024, self-released)

=== Singles ===
- "Things Fall Apart" (2017, Self-Released)
- "Chains" (2020, Self-Released)
- "Night of the Assassins" (2021, Self-Released)
- "Rewind" featuring The Baddest Beams (2022, Self-Released)
