= Good Luck Everybody =

Studio album by AJJ
- Released: January 17, 2020
- Genre: Folk punk, indie rock
- Length: 27:22
- Producer: Sean Bonnette, Ben Gallaty

AJJ chronology
Back in the Jazz Coffin (2017)	Good Luck Everybody (2020)	Disposable Everything (2023)

Singles from Good Luck Everybody
- 1. "A Poem" Released: October 29, 2019; 2. "Mega Guillotine 2020" Released: December 10, 2019; 3. "Normalization Blues" Released: January 8, 2020

Good Luck Everybody is the seventh studio album by Arizona-based folk punk band AJJ. It was released on January 17, 2020. It is the first self-produced album by the band, and also the first to be independently released on their record label AJJ Unlimited LTD.

It is the first album with new drummer Owen Evans, who first joined the band in 2016 after the departure of Deacon Batchelor.

== History ==
Several songs that would end up being included on the album would be played at AJJ shows during the early months of 2019, including "Normalization Blues", "A Big Day for Grimley", and "Mega Guillotine 2020".

The first mention of the album's production was on July 3, 2019, when a post captioned "Greetings from the studio!" was posted on Instagram. The band would formally announce the album on October 29, 2019. The first single from the album, "A Poem", was released the same day on streaming services. A second single, "Mega Guillotine 2020", was released on December 10, 2019. A third and final single, "Normalization Blues", was released January 8, 2020.

The band would tour local Zia Records stores in the Phoenix and Las Vegas area to promote the album's release over the course of three days, starting on the release day of the album January 17, and ending on January 19, having played four separate Zia Records' locations.

A tour was announced on November 18, 2019, where they would play shows with Tacocat and Emperor X on the first leg of the tour, beginning January 24, 2020, and with Xiu Xiu and Emperor X on the second leg, which was scheduled to begin on March 19, 2020. A UK leg of the tour was also announced on January 22, 2020, with the first date scheduled for July 3, 2020. However, due to the COVID-19 pandemic, the band announced the postponement of the second leg of the tour and all other future shows on March 13, 2020.

Three songs from the album would receive music videos, with "Mega Guillotine 2020" being the first to be released on December 10, 2019. The next, "Loudmouth", was released the same day as the album's release on January 17, 2020. The third and final song to receive a music video was "Body Terror Song", which released on December 5, 2020.

The album artwork is a play on the 1974 Neil Young album On The Beach.

== Track listing ==
All music is composed by AJJ.

No.	Title	Length
1.	"A Poem"	1:39
2.	"Normalization Blues"	2:39
3.	"Body Terror Song"	2:37
4.	"Feedbag"	2:14
5.	"No Justice, No Peace, No Hope"	3:32
6.	"Mega Guillotine 2020"	2:01
7.	"Loudmouth"	2:10
8.	"Maggie"	2:12
9.	"Psychic Warfare"	1:42
10.	"Your Voice, as I Remember it"	2:58
11.	"A Big Day for Grimley"	3:33
Total length:		27:22

== Critical reception ==
Professional ratings
Review scores
Source	Rating
Exclaim!	6/10
Atwood Magazine	Favorable
Paste	Positive

Bineet Kaur of Hard Noise did not rate the album, but stated "Frontman Sean Bonnette sings coherently throughout, shifting focus to the messaging. It's meant to be consumed lyrics first, everything else afterwards." Sean Craig of Mixed Frequencies states "AJJ refine their sound with some of their best songwriting to date, all while trying to make some semblance of sense of the terrible times we live in." Sputnikmusic gave the album 4.5/5.

== Charts ==
Chart performance for Good Luck Everybody
Chart (2020)	Peak position
US Top Album Sales (Billboard)	42

== Personnel ==
=== AJJ ===
- Sean Bonnette - lead vocals, rhythm guitar
- Ben Gallaty - bass guitar, double bass, backing vocals
- Preston Bryant - keyboards, piano, lead guitar, backing vocals
- Mark Glick - cello
- Owen Evans - drums, percussion

=== Additional musicians ===
- Dylan Cook
- Jeff Rosenstock
- Kimya Dawson
- Laura Stevenson
- Sophie McTear
- Thor Harris

=== Production ===
- Sean Bonnette
- Ben Gallaty

=== Mixing ===
- Jalipaz Nelson

=== Mastering ===
- Kim Rosen

=== Artwork ===
- Nate Powell
