= 1991 Senior League World Series =

American youth baseball tournament

Tournament information
- Location: Kissimmee, Florida
- Dates: August 11–17, 1991

Final positions
- Champions: Pingtung, Taiwan
- Runner-up: Pearl City, Hawaii

The 1991 Senior League World Series took place from August 11–17 in Kissimmee, Florida, United States. Pingtung, Taiwan defeated Pearl City, Hawaii twice in the championship game. It was Taiwan's fourth straight championship.

== Teams ==
| United States | International |
|---|---|
| (Florida) St. Cloud, Florida; District 3 Host | LaSalle, Ontario Canada |
| Fort Wayne, Indiana Central | Ramstein, Germany Europe |
| (New Jersey) Newark, New Jersey East | (Taiwan) Pingtung, Taiwan Far East |
| (Florida) Brandon, Florida South | Yabucoa, Puerto Rico Latin America |
| (Hawaii) Pearl City, Hawaii West | |

== Results ==
Winner's Bracket

Opening Game
— | (Florida) Host | 1
— | Florida (F/8) | 3

—
1–0 | Florida | 1
— | Hawaii | 6
— | Taiwan | 9
— | Puerto Rico | 6
— | New Jersey | 6
— | Germany | 2
— | Indiana | 4
— | Canada | 3

—
1–0 | Hawaii (F/9) | 4
1–0 | Taiwan | 3
1–0 | New Jersey | 3
1–0 | Indiana | 4

Bracket Final
2–0 | Hawaii | 3
2–0 | Indiana | 1

Loser's Bracket

—
0–1 | Germany | 2
0–1 | Puerto Rico | 16
0–1 | Canada | 3
0–1 | (Florida) Host | 5

—
1–1 | Florida | 7
1–1 | (Florida) Host | 5
1–1 | New Jersey | 2
1–1 | Puerto Rico | 5

—
1–1 | Taiwan | 15
2–1 | Florida | 1
2–1 | Indiana | 5
2–1 | Puerto Rico | 2

Bracket Final
2–1 | Taiwan | 9
3–1 | Indiana | 0

Placement Bracket

—
0–2 | Germany | 8
0–2 | Canada | 7

—
1–2 | New Jersey | 1
1–2 | Germany | 8
2–2 | Florida | 2
1–2 | (Florida) Host | 11

—
2–2 | Puerto Rico | 4
2–2 | Germany | 9
3–2 | Indiana | 3
2–2 | (Florida) Host (F/8) | 4

Third-place game
3–2 | Germany | 7
3–2 | (Florida) Host | 4

Elimination Round

Semifinals
2–0 | Hawaii | 3
2–0 | Indiana | 1
2–1 | Taiwan | 9
3–1 | Indiana | 0

World championship
3–0 | Hawaii | 1 · 3
3–1 | Taiwan | 2 · 8
Third-place game
3–2 | Germany | 7
3–2 | (Florida) Host | 4

1991 Senior League World Series Champions
Pingtung, Taiwan
