= The Necronauts =

American musical group

- Origin: Mesa, Arizona
- Genres: Indie rock, punk, lo-fi
- Years active: 2000-present
- Labels: High School Football Records; Black Cactus Records; Sunset Alliance
- Website: thenecronauts.com

The Necronauts is a band originally from Mesa, Arizona. It has been active for well over ten years and maintains a place in the Arizona punk rock scene, and has now started to find a place nationwide.

== History ==
The Necronauts formed in 2000 in Dale and Billy Goodman's parents' trailer in East Mesa, Arizona, with Dale on drums and Billy on vocals and guitars. Together, they would produce a genre bending style of music that is all their own, but can mostly fit into simply punk rock. Over the years, they have enlisted the help of many different bass players, but currently on bass is Young Joe Edwards.

The band's name comes from a comic book character created by Billy G. According to Billy, the meaning of "necronaut" is quite simple: necro, meaning dead, and naut, meaning sailor or explorer. In interviews, he has also said that it could be taken to mean "a fear of reflected light, like a reflected soul, a fear of dying."

Like many other bands, they started very small, releasing multiple CD-Rs recorded in Billy G.'s garage. In addition, their first studio recording, called Melodic Array of Change, would be recorded by a group of students at the Conservatory of Recording Arts and Sciences in Tempe, Arizona and released by tiny indie labels High School Football Records (owned and managed by Billy G.) and Sunset Alliance (which was then just getting started). In spite of its small release, this record would start to draw positive critical press for the band. Admiring the band's ability to move from genre to genre during the length of one album, the critic at Impact Press would call it "some good stuff from the Grand Canyon State."

By 2005, when the Necronauts released their acclaimed self-titled EP, the Arizona Republic would select them as its Best Indie Rock Band. The Necronauts would continue to ride their local success for a while, but this was the last album the Necronauts would release for six years, as Billy G. worked to expand his record label, High School Football Records, to a roster that includes eight artists that freely disseminate their music on-line.

The Necronauts' 2011 release is perhaps their most-ambitious, and definitely their most critically acclaimed album to date. Gauche et Droite, a two-disc, forty track record on High School Football Records and Black Cactus Records, draws comparisons to the likes of "Built to Spill, Dinosaur Jr., Pavement, Sonic Youth, the Pixies and Fugazi,". This album would receive four stars from Jeffrey Sisk at The Daily News in Pennsylvania. In addition, Mike at Brooklyn Rocks called this album "essential listening."

== Band members ==
=== Current members ===
- Billy Goodman (Billy G.) - Vocals, Bass (2000–present)
- Dale Goodman - Drums (2000–present)
- Tim Culver - (TopKey) Keyboards (2014–present)
- Matthew Reveles - Guitar, Vocals (2016–present)

=== Former members ===
- Andrew Pangus - Bass (2000 - 2008)
- Christopher Warmuth - Bass (2008 - 2010)
- Jason Sukut - Bass (2010 - 2011)
- Joe Edwards - Bass (2011–2012)

== Discography ==
=== Albums ===
Release date	Title	Label	Notes
2000	15 Songs About Snoitome and Snoitautis	High School Football Records	Dale and Billy started the band a few months before this recording. 15 tracks recorded live to a CD-R on a 2-track in Kenny's garage.
2001	11 songs	High School Football Records	11 tracks recorded live to a CD-R on a 2-track in DJ's garage.
2002	An Anatomically Correct Compilation	High School Football Records	Compilation of various songs from 11 Songs and 15 Songs About Snoitome and Snoitautis.
2002	Melodic Array of Change	High School Football Records, Sunset Alliance Records	This was the band's first studio release. It was recorded by a handful of helpful students at the Conservatory of Recording Arts and Sciences in Tempe.
2003	Aire Fresco	High School Football Records	They "rented" out Modified Arts one afternoon and made a record with Brandon Hodgins. This was also a live recording.
2004	Necronauts / Existi Split	High School Football Records	7" vinyl.
2004	Self-titled	High School Football Records	Recorded in grandma DeMazzy's bedroom by Cory Spotts.
2010	Gauche et Droite	High School Football Records, Black Cactus Records	This is a double-LP. Gauche was recorded and produced by Jalipaz at Audioconfusion. Droite was recorded by Lance Lammers, Flying Blanket Recording, Matt Turner, and billy g. Both are mastered by Carl Saff.
2014	OTD	High School Football Records	This is an 8 song, 21 minute LP. Mixed, mastered, and produced by billy g.
2015	Ralph and Barbara	High School Football Records	A 5-song EP. This is an experimental album, with the Necronauts adding Tim Culver on keyboards, samples, and synth. Mixed, mastered, and produced by billy g.
