= Christmas Island (Andrew Jackson Jihad album) =

Studio album by Andrew Jackson Jihad
- Released: May 6, 2014
- Genre: Indie rock, folk punk, indie folk, psychedelic folk
- Length: 33:51
- Label: SideOneDummy
- Producer: John Congleton

Andrew Jackson Jihad chronology
Knife Man (2011)	Christmas Island (2014)	The Bible 2 (2016)

Singles from Christmas Island
- 1. "Children of God"; 2. "Temple Grandin"; 3. "Coffin Dance"; 4. "Keep Chooglin'"/"Getting Naked, Playing With Guns " 5. "Do, Re, and Me"

Professional ratings
Review scores
Source	Rating
Allmusic	2.5/5 stars
Phoenix New Times	(favorable)
Punknews.org	4.0/5 stars

Christmas Island is the fifth studio album by Andrew Jackson Jihad, released by SideOneDummy Records on May 6, 2014. It was produced by John Congleton. It marks the group's departure from their original folk punk sound, and is their first album as a 5-piece. It is the last album to be released by the band under their original name, Andrew Jackson Jihad.

== Track listing ==
All lyrics are written by Sean Bonnette; all music is composed by Andrew Jackson Jihad.

No.	Title	Length
1.	"Temple Grandin"	2:23
2.	"Children of God"	2:06
3.	"Do, Re and Me"	1:59
4.	"Coffin Dance"	3:19
5.	"Getting Naked, Playing with Guns"	3:19
6.	"I Wanna Rock Out In My Dreams"	3:26
7.	"Kokopelli Face Tattoo"	3:19
8.	"Best Friend"	2:08
9.	"Linda Ronstadt"	3:01
10.	"Deathlessness"	3:41
11.	"Temple Grandin Too"	2:15
12.	"Angel of Death"	2:55

== Personnel ==
=== Andrew Jackson Jihad ===
- Sean Bonnette – lead vocals, rhythm guitar
- Ben Gallaty – bass guitar, double bass, backing vocals, marimba, bells
- Preston Bryant – piano, lead guitar, backing vocals, harpsichord, mellotron, waterphone, organ, synthesizer
- Mark Glick – cello
- Deacon Batchelor – drums, percussion, surdo

=== Additional personnel ===
- Jamie Stewart – vocals on "Coffin Dance"
- John Congleton – producer
- Alex Bhore – engineer
- Alan Douches – mastering
- Suzanne Falk – artwork
- Jeff Rosenstock – layout

== Charts ==
Chart performance for Christmas Island
Chart (2014)	Peak position
US Billboard 200	153
