= Howdilly Doodilly =

Studio album by Okilly Dokilly
- Released: November 11, 2016
- Recorded: May 2016
- Studio: Audioconfusion in Mesa, Arizona
- Genre: Metalcore; parody music
- Length: 40:42
- Label: Independent
- Producer: Jalipaz Nelson

Okilly Dokilly chronology
Okilly Demos (2015)	Howdilly Doodilly (2016)	Howdilly Twodilly (2019)

Singles from Howdilly Doodilly
- 1. "White Wine Spritzer" Released: October 30, 2016

Professional ratings
Review scores
Source	Rating
Kill Your Stereo	40/100
Rock n Reel Reviews	5/5 stars

Howdilly Doodilly is the first studio album by Phoenix-based, Ned Flanders-themed metalcore band Okilly Dokilly, released on November 11, 2016. According to the band, the lyrics contain "75% Ned quotes and 25% other characters/original." The album was recorded and mixed by Jalipaz Nelson at Audioconfusion in Mesa, Arizona in early 2016.

The single "White Wine Spritzer" was released prior to the album on October 30, 2016, with a music video on November 6.

== Track listing ==
No.	Title	Inspired from the episodes	Length
1.	"White Wine Spritzer"	Viva Ned Flanders (S10E10)	3:10
2.	"Flanderdoodles"	Treehouse of Horror XVI (S17E4)	1:52
3.	"Vegetables"	Bart the Lover (S3E16)	2:59
4.	"Nothing at All"	Little Big Mom (S11E10)	2:23
5.	"You're a Jerk"	Hurricane Neddy (S08E08)	2:51
6.	"Sacrifice"	Homer Loves Flanders (S5E16)	2:21
7.	"Press Destruct Button"	Treehouse of Horror XV (S16E1)	2:59
8.	"More Animal Than Flan"	Bart the Fink (S7E15)	3:36
9.	"They Warned Me"	Midnight Rx (S16E6)	2:58
10.	"Donut Hell"	Treehouse of Horror IV (S5E5)	2:22
11.	"Panic Room"	The Bart of War (S14E21)	3:27
12.	"Godspeed Little Doodle"	Boy-Scoutz 'n the Hood (S5E8)	6:25
13.	"All That Is Left"		3:19
Total length:			40:42

== Personnel ==
- Head Ned – vocals, screams, guitars, bass, mandolin, percussion
- Red Ned – synth, vocals
- Stead Ned – guitars
- Thread Ned – bass
- Bled Ned – drums
