= My People =

My People may refer to:

== Music ==
- My People (Duke Ellington album), 1965
- My People (Joe Zawinul album), 1996
- My People (Soul People), an album by Freddie Roach, 1968
- "My People" (song), by the Presets, 2007
- "My People", a song by Webbie from the compilation album Trill Entertainment Presents: All or Nothing, 2010
- "My People", a song by Zeebra, 2007

== Literature ==
- My People: Stories of the Peasantry of West Wales, a 1915 book by Caradoc Evans
- "My People", a 1923 poem by Langston Hughes
- My People, a 1968 book by Abba Eban

== Other uses ==
- My People, a 2023 documentary film directed by Anna Rezan
- My People FC, a youth football club founded by T. B. Joshua

== See also ==
- My Peoples, a 2000s cancelled Disney film
- Mi Gente (disambiguation)
