= 1991 Junior League World Series =

Tournament information
- Location: Taylor, Michigan
- Dates: August 12–17

Final positions
- Champions: Spring, Texas
- Runner-up: Henderson, Nevada

The 1991 Junior League World Series took place from August 12–17 in Taylor, Michigan, United States. Spring, Texas defeated Henderson, Nevada in the championship game.

== Teams ==
United States	International
(Michigan) Midland, Michigan Central	(Ontario) Windsor, Ontario; Central; Canada
(Pennsylvania) Shippensburg, Pennsylvania East	(Germany) Kaiserslautern, Germany; KMC; Europe
(Texas) Spring, Texas; Northwest 45; South	(Nuevo León) Monterrey, Nuevo León Mexico
(Nevada) Henderson, Nevada West	Isabela, Puerto Rico Puerto Rico

== Results ==
Upper round 1	Upper round 2	Upper final	World Championship
—	Canada	5
—	Michigan	4
1–0	Canada	6
1–0	Nevada	14
—	Pennsylvania	9
—	Nevada	10
2–0	Nevada	3
2–0	Texas	4
—	Germany
—	Texas
1–0	Texas	4
1–0	Puerto Rico	1
—	Mexico	4
—	Puerto Rico	9	3–0	Texas	2	7
3–1	Nevada	7	1
Lower round 1	Lower round 2	Lower round 3	Lower final
1–1	Puerto Rico	1
0–1	Michigan	1	1–1	Pennsylvania	7	2–1	Nevada	16
0–1	Pennsylvania	3	2–1	Pennsylvania	4	3–1	Pennsylvania	3
2–1	Mexico	1
1–1	Canada	0
0–1	Germany	0	1–1	Mexico	3
0–1	Mexico	18

1991 Junior League World Series Champions
Northwest 45 LL
Spring, Texas
