= The Bible 2 =

Studio album by AJJ
- Released: August 18, 2016
- Genres: Folk punk, art rock, psychedelic folk, lo-fi
- Length: 29:12
- Label: SideOneDummy
- Producer: John Congleton

AJJ chronology
Christmas Island (2014)	The Bible 2 (2016)	Back in the Jazz Coffin (2017)

Singles from The Bible 2
- 1. "Goodbye, Oh Goodbye" Released: July 7, 2016; 2. "Junkie Church" Released: August 1, 2016

The Bible 2 is the sixth studio album by Arizona-based folk punk band AJJ. It was released on August 18, 2016. The album was the first released after the band officially changed their name to AJJ in February 2016.

The album has been described by critics as "punchy, clever, and absurdist."

== History ==
The band performed several of the album's songs on the preceding tour. Songs like "Goodbye, Oh Goodbye", "Cody's Theme", "Golden Eagle", "Small Red Boy", "When I'm A Dead Boy", and "No More Shame, No More Fear, No More Dread" were played live prior to the album announcement.

The Bible 2 was announced on July 7, 2016. It was accompanied by the release of the song and music video for "Goodbye, Oh Goodbye", as well as an updated website with pre-order bundles. The pre-order bundles included a safe that was designed to look like a book, a T-shirt, a skateboard deck printed with the lyrics of "When I'm A Dead Boy", as well as colored vinyl options for pre-ordering.

On August 1, 2016, the music video for "Junkie Church" was released. From August 4 through to August 12, the band released one song per day via the band's Bandcamp page in the track list order. By August 12, the entire album was available to listen to for free on Bandcamp.

== Track listing ==
All music is composed by AJJ.

No.	Title	Length
1.	"Cody's Theme"	2:03
2.	"Golden Eagle"	2:14
3.	"Junkie Church"	2:40
4.	"American Garbage"	2:24
5.	"No More Shame, No More Fear, No More Dread"	4:20
6.	"Goodbye, Oh Goodbye"	3:03
7.	"White Worms"	2:43
8.	"My Brain Is a Human Body"	2:14
9.	"Terrifyer"	2:28
10.	"Small Red Boy"	4:50
11.	"When I'm a Dead Boy"	1:33
Total length:		29:12

== Charts ==
Chart performance for The Bible 2
Chart (2016)	Peak position
US Heatseekers Albums (Billboard)	5
US Top Rock Albums (Billboard)	22

== Personnel ==
=== AJJ ===
- Sean Bonnette - lead vocals, rhythm guitar
- Ben Gallaty - bass guitar, double bass, backing vocals
- Preston Bryant - keyboards, piano, lead guitar, backing vocals
- Mark Glick - cello
- Deacon Batchelor - drums, percussion

=== Production ===
- John Congleton
- Alex Bhore

=== Mastering ===
- Alan Douches

=== Artwork ===
- Sean Bonnette

=== Layout ===
- Rachel Harper
- Christina Johns
