= Daniel Somers =

Author of widely seen suicide note (1983–2013)

- Born: 14 January 1983
- Died: 10 June 2013 (aged 30) Phoenix, Arizona, USA
- Allegiance: United States
- Branch: United States Army
- Service years: 2003–2007
- Conflicts: Operation Iraqi Freedom

Daniel Somers (14 January 1983 – 10 June 2013) was an American soldier who committed suicide in 2013. He had been suffering from various health problems, including post-traumatic stress disorder (PTSD), and left a suicide note that was later published on Gawker, after which it went viral.

== Background ==
Daniel Somers was the son of a physician and a health-care administrator. He married Angeline Roth, his former high school sweetheart, in 2001. The couple had no children. Somers enlisted in the National Guard in 2003. One year later he was deployed to Iraq as part of the Tactical Human Intelligence Team. In Operation Iraqi Freedom he served over 400 combat missions. By 2008, a year after the end of his second deployment, he had been diagnosed with PTSD, traumatic brain injury (suffered in combat), fibromyalgia, and a host of other medical problems.

After returning from the war in 2007, Somers founded a band in the Phoenix area called Lisa Savige. He served as guitarist, vocalist, songwriter, and bandleader for the group. Lisa Savige performed at various live events in the US Southwest and on KWSS-LP, the independent radio station in Phoenix, frequently donating its proceeds to benefit people wounded in the Middle East. Lisa Savidge disbanded in 2011.

Somers sent a letter to the VA in October 2011, describing his symptoms as worsening in several ways, including nightly panic attacks and auditory hallucinations. In that letter, he said his situation "drives me to consider suicide very seriously on a daily basis."

== Death and aftermath ==
On June 10, 2013, Somers died from a self-inflicted gunshot wound to the head at the age of 30 in Phoenix, Arizona.

According to his suicide note, feeling deeply troubled by his involvement in the Iraq War and a lack of post-combat support from the US government were two primary reasons behind choosing to kill himself:

The simple truth is this: During my first deployment, I was made to participate in things, the enormity of which is hard to describe. War crimes, crimes against humanity. Though I did not participate willingly, and made what I thought was my best effort to stop these events, there are some things that a person simply can not come back from.... To force me to do these things and then participate in the ensuing coverup is more than any government has the right to demand. Then, the same government has turned around and abandoned me....

Is it any wonder then that the latest figures show 22 veterans killing themselves each day? That is more veterans than children killed at Sandy Hook, every single day.... And for what? Bush's religious lunacy? Cheney's ever growing fortune and that of his corporate friends? Is this what we destroy lives for?...

The fact is that any kind of ordinary life is an insult to those who died at my hand. How can I possibly go around like everyone else while the widows and orphans I created continue to struggle? If they could see me sitting here in suburbia, in my comfortable home working on some music project they would be outraged, and rightfully so....

[N]ow I am free. I feel no more pain. I have no more nightmares or flashbacks or hallucinations. I am no longer constantly depressed or afraid or worried.

I am free.

Three weeks after her husband's death, Angel Somers was notified by the Phoenix VA that her husband's claim for full disability benefits had been approved retroactively to 2008. Musicians in the Phoenix area organized a tribute concert for him on August 24, 2013.

The Arizona Republic quoted US Representative from Arizona Kyrsten Sinema: "Daniel Somers is the original whistle-blower of the Phoenix VA" (Friday, July 11, 2014, pages A1 and A16). His parents continue to press for systemic change in the VA system. Somers' death highlighted the ongoing struggle of US veterans dealing with the consequences of their involvement in wars in Iraq and Afghanistan. Former US Representative Ron Paul described Somers as representing "a generation of American veterans facing a life sentence in the prison of tortured and deeply damaged minds as well as broken bodies.... We should be angry with those who send them to suffer and die in unnecessary wars. We should be angry with those who send them to kill so many people overseas for no purpose whatsoever."

Somers' parents, Jean and Howard Somers, have become strong advocates for the well-being of returning soldiers and for PTSD awareness. They met with Congressional and VA officials in August 2013 and authorized the release of their son's records to the Washington Post in an effort to document publicly how the VA failed him, hoping they might help others in the process. Steve Vogel of the Washington Post described Somers' death as "a case study in how federal agencies continue to fail veterans." In that article, Kim Ruocco, director of Tragedy Assistance Program for Survivors (TAPS), is quoted as saying the case "shines a light on these issues." The New York Times published an article written by the couple on November 11, 2013 (Veterans Day in the US), in which they told their son's story and advocated for awareness and change in the way veterans receive health care. They proposed that the VA prioritize care based on severity of the patient's condition, and that the VA also commit all of its hospitals and clinical services to treating veterans with conditions resulting from combat, and contract routine care services to other providers.

In May 2014, one month after initial reports of the Veterans Health Administration scandal of 2014 were aired on CNN, and nearly a year after their son's suicide, Jean and Howard Somers announced "Operation Engage America," their own plan to raise awareness and educate Americans about the special needs of veterans returning home with what they had begun to call "moral injury." The plan included advocating for an easily accessible online resource for loved ones of returning soldiers that would help them understand the special problems the veterans might be dealing with, such as PTSD. The plan also included advocating for a contractual requirement with health professionals working for the VA to give 90 days notice before leaving the VA. The purpose of this was to preserve continuity of care for veterans who were currently being treated. Operation Engage America was launched on June 7, 2014, with two "resource fairs", one in San Diego, CA, and the other in Des Moines, IA. Their website indicates their intention to make it an annual event. On Thursday, July 10, 2014, they testified before the US House Veterans' Affairs Committee and proposed a number of specific reforms.

On July 23, 2019, US Senator Kyrsten Sinema paid tribute to Sergeant Somers in her maiden speech in the Senate chamber.

== See also ==
- Posttraumatic stress disorder
