= Can't Maintain =

2009 studio album by AJJ

Studio album by Andrew Jackson Jihad
- Released: October 13, 2009
- Genre: Punk rock; folk punk; indie folk
- Length: 28:23
- Label: Asian Man

Andrew Jackson Jihad chronology
| Operation Stackola (2009) | Can't Maintain (2009) | Knife Man (2011) |

Professional ratings
Review scores
| Source | Rating |
|---|---|
| Punknews.org | 4.5/5 stars |
| Sputnikmusic | 3.5/5 stars |

Can't Maintain (stylized as can't maintain.) is the third studio album by Andrew Jackson Jihad.

== Production ==
Jeff Rosenstock played horns and theremin on the album. The release was mastered by Carl Saff. In 2019, AJJ frontman Sean Bonnette ranked Can't Maintain as his third favorite album from the band's six releases to date and described it as "the only record thus far where we knew the sequence going into it." In 2019, AJJ celebrated the album's 10th anniversary by playing it in full at a fundraising concert in Phoenix, Arizona.

== Track listing ==
All lyrics are written by Sean Bonnette; all music is composed by Andrew Jackson Jihad.

| No. | Title | Length |
|---|---|---|
| 1. | "Heartilation" | 2:01 |
| 2. | "Self Esteem" | 1:36 |
| 3. | "Love in the Time of Human Papillomavirus" | 2:04 |
| 4. | "Evil" | 2:06 |
| 5. | "You Don't Deserve Yourself" | 2:30 |
| 6. | "Olde(y) Tyme(y)" | 1:09 |
| 7. | "Kazoo Sonata in Cmaj" | 1:17 |
| 8. | "We Didn't Come Here to Rock" | 2:23 |
| 9. | "Truckers Are the Blood" | 3:01 |
| 10. | "Love Will Fuck Us Apart" | 1:44 |
| 11. | "Sense, Sensibility" | 2:16 |
| 12. | "Who Are You?" | 2:40 |
| 13. | "White Face, Black Eyes" | 3:26 |
| Total length: | | 28:23 |

== Reception ==
Adam Finley, writing for PopMatters, described Can't Maintain as one of the best albums of 2009. Robin Smith of PopMatters wrote that the album "opened with scuzzy electric guitars and pounding drums" and called the track "We Didn't Come Here to Rock" a "delightfully ironic rocker." The A.V. Club included the track “Who Are You?” in its list of songs about bad fathers, adding that Bonnette "[coats] his complex emotions in witty one-liners."

== Personnel ==
=== Andrew Jackson Jihad ===
- Sean Bonnette - lead vocals, guitar, kazoo, glockenspiel
- Ben Gallaty - bass, guitar on "Evil", backing vocals
- Preston Bryant - guitar on "You Don't Deserve Yourself", piano on "White Face, Black Eyes"
- Deacon Batchelor - drums
- Owen Evans - banjo, piano on "Evil"

=== Additional personnel ===
- Jeff Rosenstock - saxophone, theremin
- Kepi Ghoulie - whistling
- David Jerkovich - drums, viola, mandolin, electric guitar, organ, and trumpet all on "Love Will Fuck Us Apart"
- Davy Charles - trumpet, trombone on "Truckers Are the Blood"
- Matt Keegan - trombone
- Tobie Milford - violin
- Jaspen Nelson - trombone on "Truckers Are the Blood"
- Allyson Seconds - vocals on "Love In The Time Of Human Papillomavirus"
- Carl Saff - mastering
- Jalipaz Nelson - recording, mixing, noise
- Ryan Piscitelli - artwork, layout
