= People Who Can Eat People Are the Luckiest People in the World =

2007 studio album by AJJ

Studio album by Andrew Jackson Jihad
- Released: September 11, 2007
- Studios: Audioconfusion in Mesa, Arizona
- Genres: Folk punk; anti-folk; acoustic
- Length: 25:17
- Label: Asian Man

Andrew Jackson Jihad chronology
Candy Cigarettes & Cap Guns (2005)	People Who Can Eat People Are the Luckiest People in the World (2007)	Only God Can Judge Me (2008)

Professional ratings
Review scores
Source	Rating
AbsolutePunk	8.6/10 stars
Daily News	3/4 stars
Punknews.org	4.5/5 stars
Sputnikmusic	3/5 stars

People Who Can Eat People Are the Luckiest People in the World (Note: Though the title is incorrectly listed as People That Can Eat People Are the Luckiest People in the World on the original cover art, the album's subsequent pressings use Who.) is the second studio album by American folk punk band Andrew Jackson Jihad. The album was released by Asian Man Records on September 11, 2007.

== Production ==
The title is derived from a line in Kurt Vonnegut's novel Hocus Pocus which itself is a reference to Barbra Streisand's song "People." Sean Bonnette, AJJ's frontman and co-founder, told the Phoenix New Times the band was "heavily into Kurt Vonnegut Jr. at the time of the recording."

The album was recorded and mixed by Jalipaz Nelson at Audioconfusion in Mesa, Arizona. This was a change for the band which had primarily done home recordings previously.

Ten years after its release, Ben Gallaty, AJJ's bassist and co-founder, observed the album's tempo was "really fucking fast" and that they "rarely had a spare moment in a song," especially when compared to the band's subsequent music.

The album artwork was illustrated by Ryan Piscitelli.

"People II: The Reckoning" features an interpolation of Simon and Garfunkel's song "Mrs. Robinson," and "Survival Song" features lyrics from Woody Guthrie’s "Do Re Mi."

== Track listing ==
All lyrics are written by Sean Bonnette and Ben Gallaty; all music is composed by Andrew Jackson Jihad.

No.	Title	Length
1.	"Rejoice"	3:15
2.	"Brave as a Noun"	1:14
3.	"Survival Song"	2:28
4.	"Bad Bad Things"	1:59
5.	"No More Tears"	1:02
6.	"Bells & Whistles"	1:28
7.	"Randy's House"	1:23
8.	"A Song Dedicated to the Memory of Stormy the Rabbit"	3:04
9.	"People II: The Reckoning"	4:08
10.	"Personal Space Invader"	2:59
11.	"People"	2:17
Total length:		25:17

== Personnel ==
=== Andrew Jackson Jihad ===
- Sean Bonnette - lead vocals, guitar, glockenspiel
- Ben Gallaty - bass, electric guitar, slide guitar, backing vocals
- John De La Cruz - drums
- Dylan Cook - mandolin, vocals

=== Additional Personnel ===
- Andrew Jemsek - accordion, vocals
- Andrew Lane - trumpet
- John Martin - vocals
- Teague Cullen - accordion, violin, cello, singing saw
- Tobie Milford - violin
- Jeff Carroll - mastering
- Jalipaz Nelson - recording, mixing, noise
- Ryan Piscitelli - artwork, layout
