= Mi Gente (disambiguation) =

"Mi Gente" is a 2017 song by J Balvin and Willy William.

Mi Gente may also refer to:

- "Mi Gente" (Héctor Lavoe song), 1973, also performed by Marc Anthony in 2007
- "Mi Gente", 2003 song by Kumbia Kings from the album 4
- "Mi Gente", 2002 album and song by Cuban singer Lucrecia
