= Knife Man =

Studio album by Andrew Jackson Jihad
- Released: September 20, 2011
- Recorded: March 14–19, 2011
- Genre: Folk punk, folk rock, indie folk, indie rock, punk rock
- Length: 43:07
- Label: Asian Man

Andrew Jackson Jihad chronology
Can't Maintain (2009)	Knife Man (2011)	Christmas Island (2014)

Singles from Knife Man
- 1. "Gift of the Magi 2: Return of the Magi" Released: April 16, 2012; 2. "Fucc the Devil" Released: September 21, 2012

Knife Man is the fourth studio album by Andrew Jackson Jihad released by Asian Man Records on September 20, 2011. The album was recorded and mixed by Jalipaz Nelson at Audioconfusion in Mesa, Arizona.

== Track listing ==
All lyrics are written by Sean Bonnette and Ben Gallaty; all music is composed by Andrew Jackson Jihad.

No.	Title	Length
1.	"The Michael Jordan of Drunk Driving"	0:23
2.	"Gift of the Magi 2: Return of the Magi"	1:56
3.	"American Tune"	2:27
4.	"Back Pack"	3:36
5.	"Distance"	2:33
6.	"Fucc the Devil"	1:42
7.	"Hate, Rain on Me"	2:06
8.	"If You Have Love in Your Heart"	1:31
9.	"No One"	4:08
10.	"Sad Songs (Intermission)"	3:55
11.	"Zombie by the Cranberries by Andrew Jackson Jihad"	2:32
12.	"People II 2: Still Peoplin'"	3:10
13.	"Sorry Bro"	1:58
14.	"Skate Park"	1:45
15.	"Free Bird"	4:09
16.	"Big Bird"	5:22
Total length:		43:07

== Critical reception ==
Professional ratings
Review scores
Source	Rating
About.com	5/5 stars
AbsolutePunk	(86/100)
PopMatters	(8/10)
Sputnikmusic	4.5/5 stars

Punk music review site AbsolutePunk gave the album a rating of 86 out of 100 with Dre Okorley concluding that "Knife Man is synonymous to the gritted teeth and theatrical story lining of a clever manic depressive duo on a wild ride of political blindsiding and folk-rock maturity." PopMatters gave the album a score of 8/10 stating "The moralizing on Knife Man does get heavy-handed at times, but the homespun simplicity and rage with which it’s delivered actually adds to its power." Also stating it was "one of the most remarkable albums you'll hear all year." Sputnikmusic gave the album 4.5/5.

== In popular culture ==
In the television series Limitless (TV series), the track "Distance" is played during a montage scene in the third episode of the show.

== Personnel ==
=== Andrew Jackson Jihad ===
- Sean Bonnette - lead vocals, rhythm guitar, kazoo
- Ben Gallaty - bass guitar, double bass, guitar, backing vocals, percussion, bells, sampler
- Preston Bryant - drums on "Distance" and "No One", organ on "No One", lead guitar and piano on "Sad Songs (Intermission)"
- Deacon Batchelor - drums, percussion, backing vocals
- Dylan Cook - mandolin, backing vocals

=== Additional personnel ===
- Stephen Steinbrink - electric guitar, bells, and organ on "Back Pack"
- Ben Horowitz - guitar on "Hate, Rain on Me"
- John Martin - organ on "If You Have Love In Your Heart"
- Shane Kennedy - drums on "American Tune", "Sad Songs (Intermission), and "Free Bird", co-producer
- Alex Cardwell - backing vocals
- Beth Lasswell - backing vocals
- Colin Levy - backing vocals
- JoJo "Sninja" Martín - backing vocals
- Carl Saff - mastering
- Jalipaz Nelson - recording, mixing
- Stephanie Carrico – photography
- Sentrock - artwork
- Jeff Rosenstock - layout
