= The People =

The People may refer to:

== Law and politics ==
- General will, a concept in political philosophy developed by Jean-Jacques Rousseau
- The People, term used to refer to the people in general, in legal documents
- "We the People of the United States", from the Preamble to the U. S. Constitution
- In philosophy, economics, and political science, the term "the people" may be invoked when discussing the common good
- Commoners, ordinary people without significant social status
- Proletariat, the social class of wage-earners

== Music ==
- People!, a rock band active mainly in the 1960s
- The People (EP), an EP by The Music
- "The People" (song), a single from rapper Common's 2007 album Finding Forever

== Popular culture ==
- The People, series of fantasy novelettes and short stories by Zenna Henderson, collected in Ingathering: The Complete People Stories
- The People (film), a 1972 television film starring William Shatner, based on the "Pottage" story by Zenna Henderson
- The People, an unfinished novel by Bernard Malamud
- The People, a collective name of all subterranean fairy cultures in the Artemis Fowl book series
- The People, an Indian Malayalam-language film series by Jayaraj, consisting of
  - 4 the People (2004)
  - By the People (2005 film)
  - Of the People (2008)

== Publications ==
- The People, a newspaper, now known as the Sunday People, a British "red-top" Sunday-only newspaper, owned by Reach plc
- The People (1891), the official English-language organ of the Socialist Labor Party of America from 1891 to 2008
- The People, a daily newspaper in Kenya
- The People, or an-Nas, a sura (chapter) of the Qur'an
- The People's Daily, the biggest newspaper group in China

== See also ==
- People (disambiguation)
- The Crown is the state in all its aspects within the jurisprudence of the Commonwealth realms. In the United States the form "the People" is often used instead.
