= Okilly Dokilly =

American metal band themed around The Simpsons

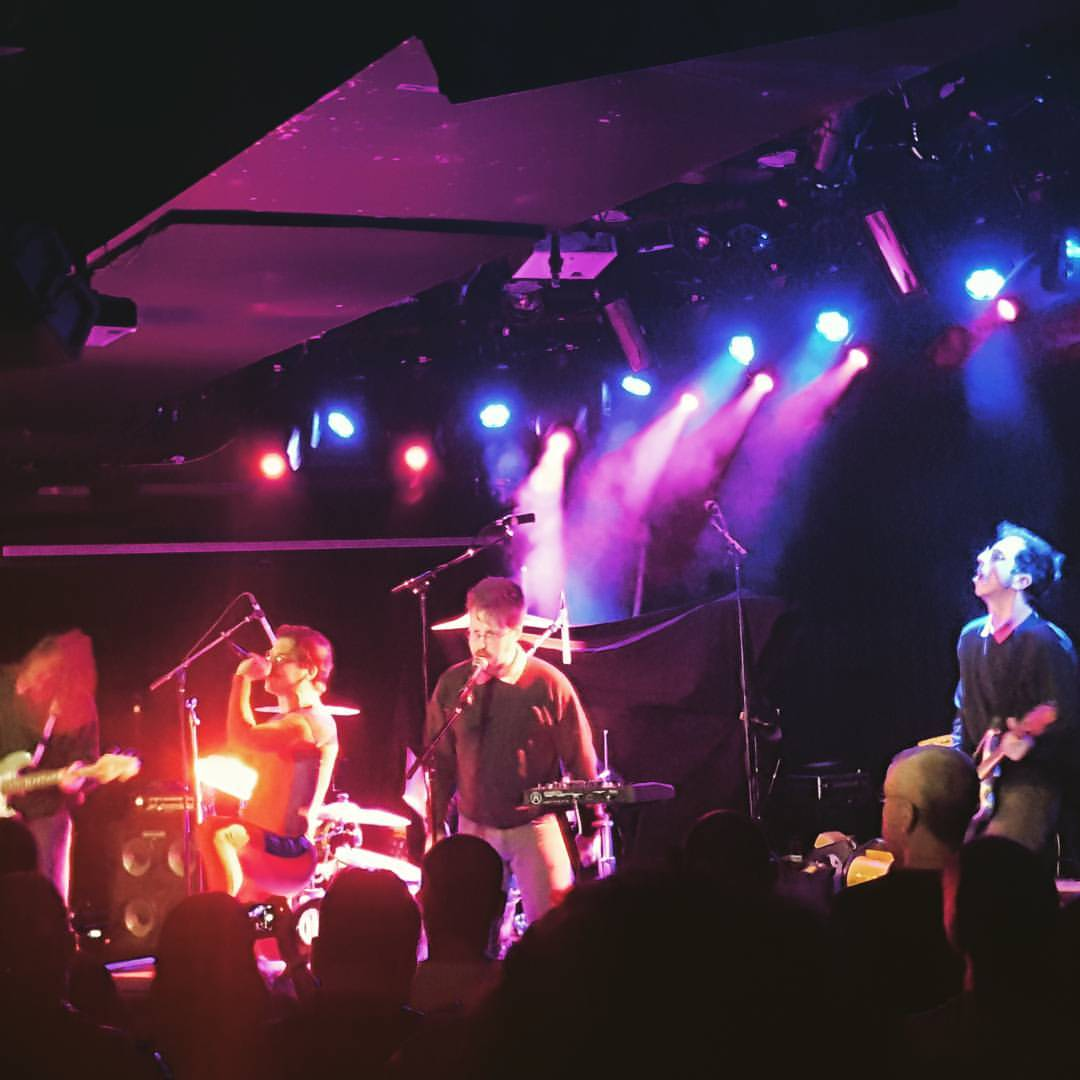
- Okilly Dokilly performing in 2017

Background information
- Origin: Phoenix, Arizona, U.S.
- Genres: Comedy rock; metalcore
- Years active: 2015–2022
- Past members: Head Ned; Zed Ned; Dread Ned; Red Ned; Stead Ned; Shred Ned; Thread Ned; Bed Ned; Bled Ned
- Website: okillydokilly.com

Okilly Dokilly was an American metalcore band from Phoenix, Arizona themed around the animated character Ned Flanders from the television series The Simpsons.

== History ==
The band's first studio-album, Howdilly Doodilly, was released on November 11, 2016.

The band announced they would split up at the conclusion of their 2022 tour.

== In popular culture ==
On April 7, 2019, the band appeared during the end credits of The Simpsons episode "I'm Just a Girl Who Can't Say D'oh".

== Members ==
Final lineup

- Head Ned – lead vocals, guitar, bass, mandolin, percussion (2015–2022)
- Zed Ned – keyboards (2018–2022)
- Dread Ned – drums (2018–2022)
- Shred Ned – lead guitar (2018–2022)

Former members

- Red Ned – keyboards, backing vocals (2015–2018)
- Stead Ned – lead guitar (2015–2017)
- Thread Ned – bass (2015–2017)
- Bed Ned – bass (2018–2019)
- Bled Ned – drums (2015–2018)

Touring members

- Dead Ned – lead guitar (2017–2018)
- Led Ned – lead guitar (2022)
- Cred Ned – bass (2017–2018)
- Bred Ned – bass (2019, 2021)
- Bloodshed Ned – bass (2022)

Timeline

== Discography ==
=== LPs ===
Title	Details
Howdilly Doodilly	Released: November 11, 2016; Label: Self-released
Howdilly Twodilly	Released: March 29, 2019; Label: Self-released

=== Demos ===
Title	Details
Okilly Demos	Released: August 11, 2015; Label: Self released

=== Singles ===
Title	Year	Album
"White Wine Spritzer"	2016	Howdilly Doodilly
"Reneducation"	2019	Howdilly Twodilly
"Bulletproof Glass"	2019	Howdilly Twodilly
"Slaughterhouse"	2020	–

=== Music videos ===
Title	Year	Director
"White Wine Spritzer"	2016	Justin Humbert
"Reneducation"	2019	Nick Mills
