= Candy Cigarettes & Cap Guns =

Studio album by Andrew Jackson Jihad
- Released: March 11, 2005
- Genre: Folk punk, anti-folk
- Length: 22:32
- Label: The Audioconfusion Manifesto

Andrew Jackson Jihad chronology
Candy Cigarettes & Cap Guns (2005)	People Who Can Eat People Are the Luckiest People in the World (2007)

Professional ratings
Review scores
Source	Rating
MusicBanter	(8.5/10)

Candy Cigarettes & Cap Guns is the first studio album by folk punk band Andrew Jackson Jihad. The album was released in March 11, 2005.

== Track listing ==
All lyrics are written by Sean Bonnette and Ben Gallaty; all music is composed by Andrew Jackson Jihad.

No.	Title	Length
1.	"Cigarette Song"	1:17
2.	"Jesus"	2:43
3.	"Love Song"	2:39
4.	"Scenesters"	2:08
5.	"Dad Song"	1:57
6.	"F.W.P."	1:26
7.	"God Made Dirt"	1:53
8.	"Lady Killer"	1:20
9.	"Love Song II"	3:07
10.	"Most Aborted Father"	1:49
11.	"Dylan Cook's Theme Song"	2:13
Total length:		22:32

== Personnel ==
=== Andrew Jackson Jihad ===
- Sean Bonnette – lead vocals, guitar
- Ben Gallaty – bass, backing vocals
- Justin James White – drums, percussion

=== Additional Personnel ===
- Mark Greer – mastering
- Jalipaz Nelson – recording
- Djentrification – artwork, layout
