= Michael Peoples =

American baseball player (born 1991)

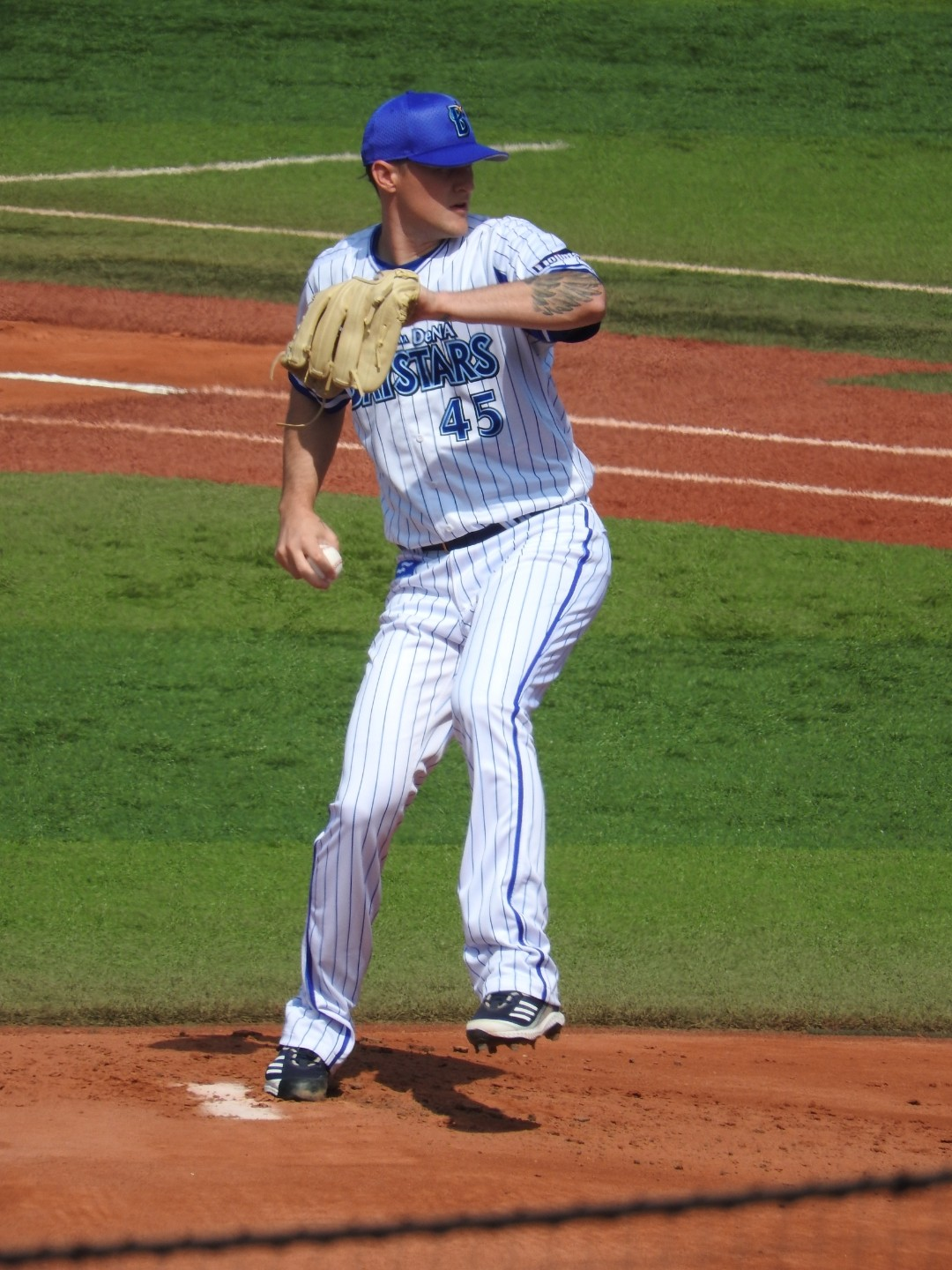
- Peoples with the Yokohama DeNA BayStars
- Pitcher
- Born: September 5, 1991 (age 34); Weatherford, Texas
- Batted: Right Threw: Right

NPB debut
- June 19, 2020, for the Yokohama DeNA BayStars

Last NPB appearance
- April 22, 2022, for the Yokohama DeNA BayStars

NPB statistics
- Win–loss record: 5-8
- Earned run average: 4.91
- Strikeouts: 74

Teams
- Yokohama DeNA Baystars (2020–2022)

Scott Michael Peoples (born September 5, 1991) is an American former professional baseball pitcher. He played in Nippon Professional Baseball (NPB) for the Yokohama DeNA BayStars.

== Playing career ==
=== Cleveland Indians ===
The Cleveland Indians chose Peoples in the 14th round in the 2012 Major League Baseball draft. He made his professional debut for the Mahoning Valley Scrappers. He split the 2013 season between the Single-A Lake County Captains and the High-A Carolina Mudcats, accumulating a 2–6 record and 4.14 ERA in 19 games. He spent the 2014 season in Carolina, pitching to a 7–8 record and 4.34 ERA in 101 2/3 innings pitched. He remained in High-A ball the next year with the Lynchburg Hillcats, pitching to a 11–4 record and 3.42 ERA in 25 appearances. Peoples reached Triple-A for the first time in 2016 with the Columbus Clippers, but spent the majority of the in Double-A with the Akron RubberDucks, notching a 13–6 record and 3.65 ERA.

In 2017, Peoples again split the year between Columbus and Akron, recording a 3–9 record and 6.27 ERA, and missed the later part of the year with a rotator cuff strain. Peoples again played for Columbus and Akron in 2018, pitching to a 5.28 ERA in only 10 games, missing much of the year due to a right foot contusion and a right elbow sprain. He spent the 2019 season in Triple-A with Columbus, pitching to a 10–6 record and 3.98 ERA with 122 strikeouts in 144 2/3 innings of work. Peoples elected free agency following the season on November 4, 2019.

=== Yokohama DeNA BayStars ===
On November 19, 2019, Peoples signed with the Yokohama DeNA BayStars of the Nippon Professional Baseball. On June 19, 2020, Peoples made his NPB debut. Peoples played in 10 games for Yokohama in 2020, notching a 2–2 record and 4.97 ERA with 27 strikeouts.

In 2021, Peoples appeared in 18 games for Yokohama, posting a 3-4 record and 4.21 ERA with 41 strikeouts in 47.0 innings pitched. He made three appearances for the club in 2022, struggling to an 0-2 record and 15.00 ERA with four strikeouts in 3.0 innings of work. He was released on July 25, 2022.

== Coaching career ==
=== Seattle Mariners ===
On January 24, 2023, Peoples was hired by the Seattle Mariners organization to serve as the pitching coach for their Double-A affiliate, the Arkansas Travelers. He reprised his role for the 2024 season.

=== Cleveland Guardians ===
On January 30, 2025, Peoples was hired by the Cleveland Guardians organization as a pitching coordinator.
