= AJJ (band) =

American folk-punk band

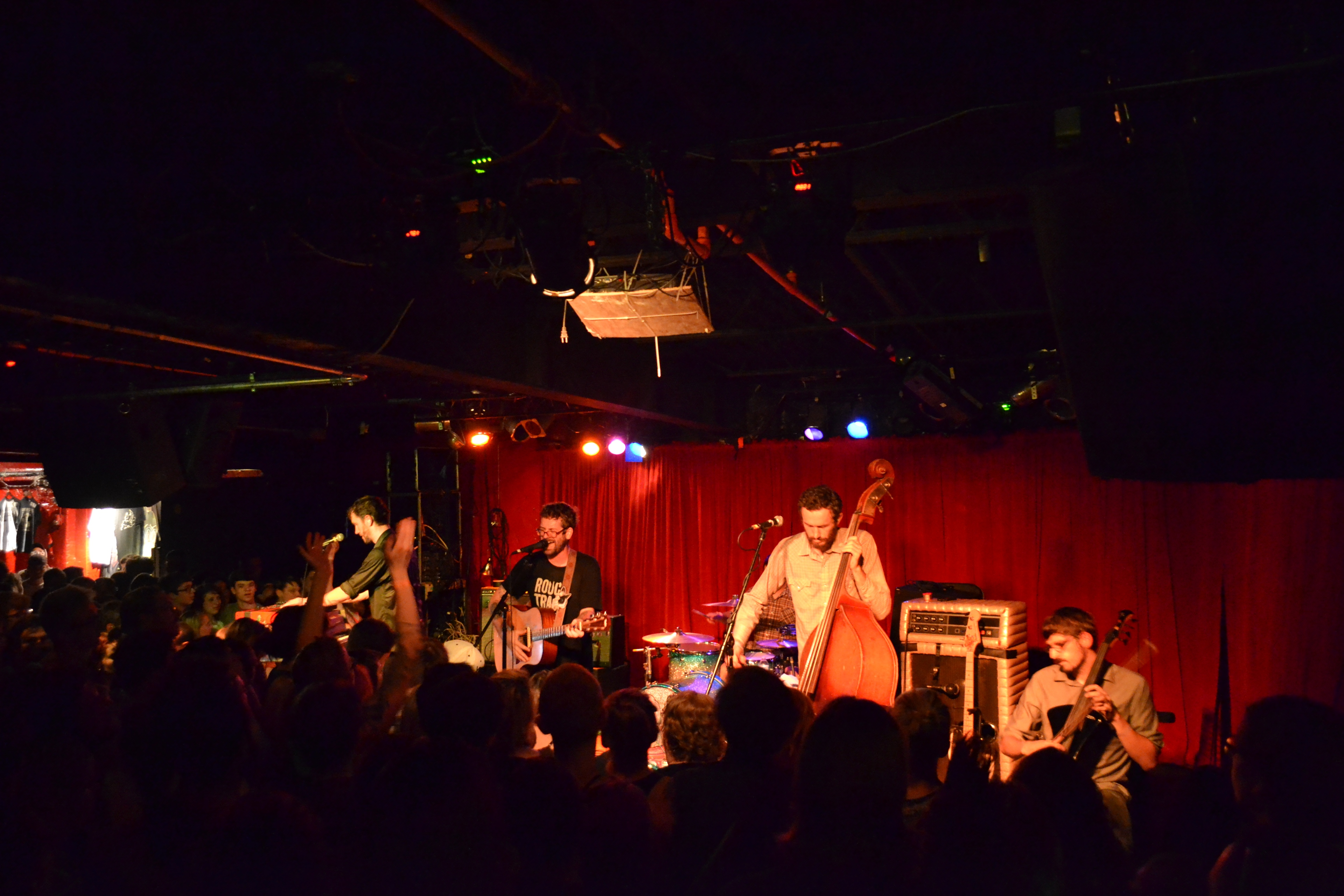
- AJJ performing at the Grog Shop in Cleveland Heights in 2014

Background information
- Also known as: Andrew Jackson Jihad (2004–2016); The AJJs
- Origin: Phoenix, Arizona, U.S.
- Genres: Folk punk, anti-folk, folk, punk, experimental
- Years active: 2004–present
- Labels: SideOneDummy; Asian Man; No Idea; Art of the Underground; Traffic Street; Suburban Home; Silver Sprocket Bicycle Club; Lauren; Specialist Subject; Hopeless
- Members: Sean Bonnette; Ben Gallaty; Preston Bryant; Mark Glick; Kevin Higuchi
- Past members: Justin James White; Stephen Steinbrink; Abe Gil; John de la Cruz; Chase Kamp; Deacon Batchelor; Matt Keegan; Owen Evans
- Website: www.ajjtheband.com

AJJ is an American folk punk band from Phoenix, Arizona, originally formed in 2004 as Andrew Jackson Jihad. Their lyrics handle themes of shyness, poverty, humanity, religion, addiction, existentialism, and politics. Singer/guitarist Sean Bonnette and bassist Ben Gallaty co-founded the band, and have remained its only constant members throughout. The band has released nine studio albums to date, with their most recent, Dirty Old Power, having been released on September 25, 2026.

== History ==
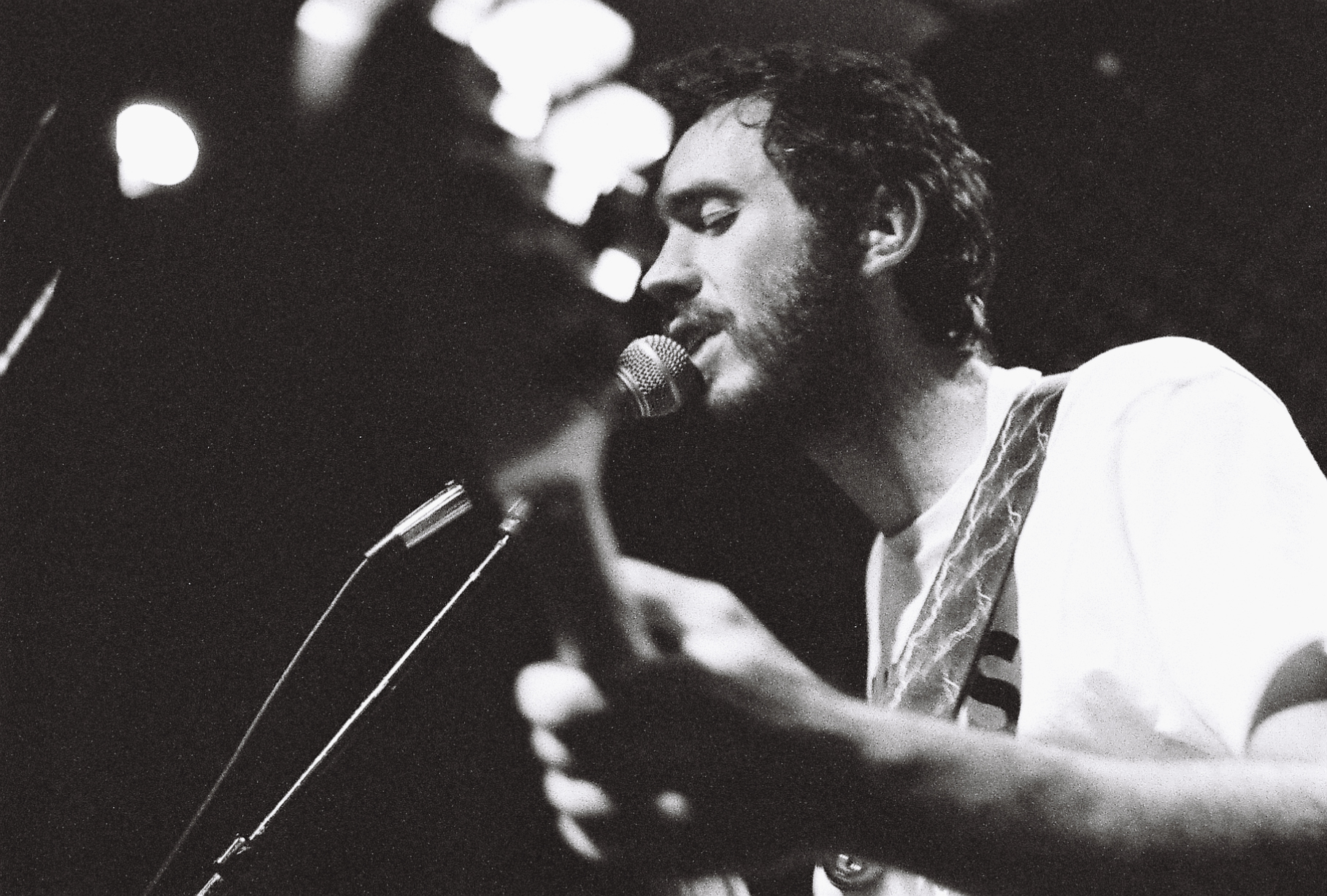
Ben Gallaty, bassist (2012)

AJJ (formerly known as Andrew Jackson Jihad) was formed by Sean Bonnette, Ben Gallaty, and drummer Justin James White, who left the band soon after. They recorded the band's first LP, Candy Cigarettes & Cap Guns, released through the Audioconfusion Manifesto label in 2005.

On April 15, 2006, the band played as part of the 2006 New Times Music Showcase, nominated for Best Americana Band, and won a Best of Phoenix award later that year.

They released a split LP with Ghost Mice on Plan-It-X-Records in 2007. Following this, Asian Man Records issued their second full-length album, People Who Can Eat People Are the Luckiest People in the World, on September 11, 2007.

In 2008, the band was a part of the Asian Man Records' "Making Punk Fun Again" tour with The Queers, Bomb the Music Industry!, Lemuria, and Kepi Ghoulie. 2008 also saw the release of "Only God Can Judge Me", a mostly acoustic EP on Plan-it-X Records.

In 2009, the band's third record, Can't Maintain, was released by Asian Man Records. They toured the US with Kepi Ghoulie and Partners in 818. At this point, the band consisted of Bonnette, Gallaty, Deacon Batchelor on drums, and Preston Bryant on guitar and keyboards.

In 2010, the band toured the US with Blunt Mechanic, Europe with Kepi Ghoulie, and the west coast with Royal Monsters.

2011 had the band go on their second European tour. They also played festivals such as Plan-It-X Fest and the Asian Man Records 15th Anniversary. Mark Glick joined the band, rounding out the sound with cello parts. The fourth full-length album, Knife Man, was released on September 20 by Asian Man Records and on cassette by Lauren Records. In support of this record, the band was part of a full US tour with Frank Turner and Into It. Over It.

In March 2012, the band toured with Laura Stevenson and ROAR, followed by another tour in April with Joyce Manor and Treasure Fleet. In September, the band did several shows with Against Me! and Joyce Manor, followed by a full US tour with Future of the Left and Jeff Rosenstock.

In April 2013, Bonnette went on a solo tour with Ian Graham of Cheap Girls. He also collaborated on a track with Sole that was released in May. In September, the band's first live album, "Live at the Crescent Ballroom", was released by Asian Man Records and on cassette by Lauren Records. In November, the band embarked on a west coast tour with The Gunshy. In June, the band recorded a new album entitled Christmas Island with John Congleton and members of their full touring lineup Preston Bryant and Deacon Batchelor. The album was released on May 6, 2014, on Side One Dummy Records.

In 2016, the band officially changed their name from "Andrew Jackson Jihad" to AJJ (a moniker that many of their fans had been using to refer to them for several years). In a statement on the band's website, Bonnette wrote "1.) We are not Muslims, and as such, it is disrespectful and irresponsible for us to use the word jihad in our band's name. 2.) We no longer wish to be a living reminder of the president Andrew Jackson. Interesting historical figure as he was, he was an odious person and our fascination with him has grown stale."

On June 28, 2016, AJJ announced their 6th studio album, The Bible 2, along with a tracklist and pre-order bundles. The band also released a music video for the album's lead single, "Goodbye, Oh Goodbye." The clip is a style parody of the viral video approach to music videos made by the band OK Go. On August 1, 2016, the music video for "Junkie Church" was released.

In 2017, the band released an EP on Lauren Records of new material entitled Back in the Jazz Coffin, consisting of acoustic songs. They also released Decade of Regression, a live album as a Record Store Day exclusive.

In August 2017, after Chris Clavin of Plan-It-X Records was "accused of and acknowledged a pattern of sexual abuse", AJJ took their music off of the label and re-released it themselves.

On October 30, 2019, AJJ announced a new studio album titled Good Luck Everybody. This announcement coincided with the release of "A Poem", the lead single from the album. After three more singles and two music videos, for "Mega Guillotine 2020" and "Loudmouth", Good Luck Everybody was released on January 17, 2020. Unlike previous releases, Good Luck Everybody is self-published under a newly formed label entitled "AJJ unlimited LTD". Later that year, following the release of the album, the band shared a cover of Silver Jews' "Candy Jail" for the Songs That Saved My Life initiative as well as a stand-alone single "Horsehair Vase" – backed with a cover of "You, Swan, Go On" by Mount Eerie. This structure followed for the band's next standalone single in 2021, "I Wanna Be Your Dog 2" – which was backed with a cover of Guided by Voices' "Motor Away".

In December 2022, the band shared a new song titled "The Baby Panda", which features backing vocals from Laura Stevenson. The following month, the band would announce their eighth studio album Disposable Everything – along with the release of its title track and another new song, "Dissonance" – as well as their signing to Hopeless Records. The album, released in May 2023, also featured "I Wanna Be Your Dog 2" and "The Baby Panda". It was their first album to include drummer Kevin Higuchi as a full-time member of the band, having been inducted officially the year prior.

== Members ==
Current

- Sean Bonnette – lead vocals, acoustic guitar (2004–present)
- Ben Gallaty – bass guitar, double bass, backing vocals (2004–present)
- Preston Bryant – electric guitar, keyboards, backing vocals (2009–present)
- Mark Glick – cello, baritone guitar (2011–present), keyboards (2023–present)
- Kevin Higuchi – drums, percussion (2022–present; touring 2021–2022)

Current touring musicians

- Grant Bubar – drums, percussion (2024–present; substitute for Kevin Higuchi)

Former

- Justin James White – drums, percussion (2004)
- John de la Cruz – drums, percussion (2004–2007)
- Stephen Steinbrink – electric guitar, backing vocals (2006–2008)
- Deacon Batchelor – drums, percussion (2007–2016)
- Dylan Cook – mandolin (2007–2013)
- Matt Keegan – trombone (2009)

Former touring musicians

- Chase Kamp – drums, percussion (2016)
- Owen Evans – drums, percussion (2016–2021)

== Discography ==
Studio albums

- Candy Cigarettes & Cap Guns (2005)
- People Who Can Eat People Are the Luckiest People in the World (2007)
- Can't Maintain (2009)
- Knife Man (2011)
- Christmas Island (2014)
- The Bible 2 (2016)
- Good Luck Everybody (2020)
- Disposable Everything (2023)
- Dirty Old Power (2026)

Live albums

- Live at Trunk Space 08/25/05 (2006)
- Live at the Bottom of the Hill (2011)
- Live at The Crescent Ballroom (2013)
- Live at Knitting Factory (2015)
- Decade of Regression (2017)
- AJJ on Audiotree Live (2018)
- Live at Third Man Records (2019)
- Live from Glasgow (2021)

Extended plays

- Issue Problems (2006)
- Art of the Underground Volume 19 (2007)
- Plant Your Roots (2007)
- Only God Can Judge Me (2008)
- Operation Stackola (2009)
- Holiday In(n) Gainesville (2009)
- Back in the Jazz Coffin (2017)

Splits

- Andrew Jackson Jihad / Flaspar / Golden Boots (2006)
- Andrew Jackson Jihad / Ghost Mice (2007)
- Andrew Jackson Jihad / French Quarter (2007)
- Andrew Jackson Jihad / Partners in 818 (2007)
- Andrew Jackson Jihad / Mischief Brew (2009)
- Andrew Jackson Jihad / Cobra Skulls – Under The Influence Vol. 6 (2009)
- Andrew Jackson Jihad / Apocalypse Meow – Pug Life (2009)
- Andrew Jackson Jihad / The Gunshy (2010)
- Andrew Jackson Jihad / Father's Day / Porches / Treasure Mammel – The Chronicles of Sheriff Joe Arpaio (2010)
- Andrew Jackson Jihad / O Pioneers!!! (2011)
- Andrew Jackson Jihad / Roar – Recorded At a Record Store 2 (2015)

Compilations

- Only God Can Judge Me and More (2008)
- Candy Cigarettes, Capguns, Issue Problems! and Such (2011)
- I Think We Should Stay Away From Each Other (Lauren Records 2011)
- An Asian Man Christmas (2011)
- Rompilation (2012)
- Rompilation 2.0: The Digitizing (2014)
- Ugly Spiral: Lost Works 2012–2016 (2018)
- Disposable Everything Else (2024)

Demos

- Holey Man, Holy War (2004)
- Demo II (2004)
- Demo III (2004)
- Home Style (Recordings) (2010)
