= Boycott Heaven =

2026 studio album by The Format

Studio album by the Format
- Released: January 23, 2026
- Recorded: 2025
- Studio: Henson (Los Angeles)
- Length: 43:32
- Label: The Vanity Label
- Producer: Brendan O'Brien

The Format chronology
Dog Problems (2006)	Boycott Heaven (2026)

Boycott Heaven is the third studio album by American indie rock band the Format. It was released on January 23, 2026, through The Vanity Label.

== Background and production ==
American indie rock band the Format announced their hiatus on February 4, 2008. In 2019, Nate Ruess was inspired to reach out to Sam Means while listening to the band's 2003 debut album, Interventions + Lullabies. They reunited for a surprise performance on February 3, 2020. A handful of reunion shows were repeatedly postponed and ultimately canceled due to the impact of the COVID-19 pandemic on the music industry. The next year, Ruess began learning how to play guitar, which led to "a crazy writing streak for nobody other than [Ruess]". Originally, Ruess intended to write a solo album with Means's assistance. By September 2024, the duo pivoted towards another Format album. They developed Boycott Heaven in two-week segments, working at Ruess's home in Santa Barbara, California, or at the Hello Merch warehouse in Phoenix, Arizona. Brendan O'Brien was later brought in as a producer. Recording began in January 2025 at Henson Recording Studios.

== Style and composition ==
Ruess envisioned Boycott Heaven as a rock album, as O'Brien was known for producing alternative rock albums. After listening to the demos, however, O'Brien told Ruess that he "cannot help but write pop songs". Ruess and Means were accompanied by O'Brien on bass guitar and Matt Chamberlain on drums for the recording of the album, with the former also providing additional guitar, piano and keyboards on certain tracks. Ruess originally wrote "Back to Life", the final track on the album, for Young Thug. It was changed into a Format song after O'Brien told Ruess that he was "not allowed to give that song away" to another artist.

== Release and promotion ==
The Format announced Boycott Heaven on October 6, 2025, and shared debut single "Holy Roller" that night while performing on The Tonight Show Starring Jimmy Fallon. The following week, the band announced a North American tour to promote the album, with support from Adult Mom, Ben Kweller, Phantom Planet, and Limbeck. Three more singles followed: "Shot in the Dark" on November 12, "Boycott Heaven" on December 12, and "Right Where I Belong" on January 6, 2026. Boycott Heaven was released on January 23, 2026.

== Track listing ==
All tracks are written by Nate Ruess and Sam Means.

Boycott Heaven standard track listing
No.	Title	Length
1.	"No Gold at the Top"	03:17
2.	"Holy Roller"	03:55
3.	"Shot in the Dark"	04:11
4.	"Forever"	03:47
5.	"Depressed"	03:32
6.	"No You Don't"	05:18
7.	"Right Where I Belong"	04:00
8.	"Human Nature"	03:00
9.	"Leave It Alone (Till the Morning)"	04:33
10.	"Boycott Heaven"	04:35
11.	"Back to Life"	03:24
Total length:		43:32

== Personnel ==
Credits adapted from the album's liner notes.

=== The Format ===
- Nate Ruess – vocals, guitars, piano
- Sam Means – guitars, piano, art direction

=== Additional contributors ===
- Brendan O'Brien – bass guitar, electric guitar, keyboards, production, mixing
- Matt Chamberlain – drums
- Kyle Stevens – mixing
- Billy Joe Bowers – mastering
- Ciaran De Chaud – engineering assistance
- Kyle Montgomery – cover photography, Crystal Mary figure
- Carlo Cavaluzzi – additional photography

== Charts ==
Chart performance for Boycott Heaven
Chart (2026)	Peak position
US Independent Albums (Billboard)	33
US Top Album Sales (Billboard)	7
