= Fight Fair =

American pop punk band

Fight Fair!
- Origin: San Diego, California, U.S.
- Genres: Pop punk, easycore
- Years active: 2008-2011
- Labels: Triple Crown, In-n-Out
- Website: www.facebook.com/fightfairsd

Fight Fair was an American pop punk band from San Diego, California, that was also based out of San Francisco, California. The band was active from 2008-2011. They were signed to Triple Crown Records. They released their debut EP titled Settle the Score in 2008 Their debut full-length "California Kicks" was released June 29, 2010, while performing on the 2010 Vans Warped Tour.

== Biography ==
Fight Fair spawned in the infamous 'San Diego State University party scene'. Lead vocalist Bigman described the band's sound as "uplifting and positive while maintaining the aggressive sound we grew up with" " Bigman is known for blurring the lines between hardcore punk and pop, widely credited with coining the term "skramz", a term used to differentiate modern mainstream screamo and underground DIY screamo. Bigman and guitarist Evan Henkel were also known in the DIY screamo and hardcore punk scene for their former band Seeing Means More, and for Bigman being a featured vocalist on influential post-hardcore/screamo band Loma Prieta's song, entitled Apparition, the final track off their 2010 album, Life/Less.

== History ==
During the formation of the band, there were a few member changes. On September 17, 2008, it was announced that the band had signed to Triple Crown Records. On September 19, Fight Fair was involved in a van and trailer accident on the border of Oregon and Washington which caused severe damage to their van, trailer and equipment. The band spent the next few days in Portland, Oregon raising money through Myspace and PayPal to fix some damages in order to make it home before Christmas. On November 12, "Pop Rocks" and "Brain Freeze!" were posted on the group's PureVolume account. A remixed and remastered version of Settle the Score was released through Triple Crown Records on November 18. It included three additional tracks.

In early 2009, they supported The Bigger Lights on a U.S. tour along with Thieves and Villains, which they later ended finished home co-headlining with School Boy Humor. Soon after they participated with 5 dates supporting Valencia with Houston Calls for the "Say No To Neon Tour". On April 7, a music video was released for "Pop Rocks". In May 2009, the band supported Amber Pacific on their headlining US tour. In support of the tour, Gibson Guitars gave away an Epiphone acoustic guitar, signed by all four bands.

In 2009, the band recorded their first full-length album, "California Kicks", with producers Mike Green and Brian Grider. The record was released June 29, 2010. After tracking the record they went straight into a tour with Breathe Carolina, Cash Cash, Stephen Jerzak and Kill Paradise called the EZ BRONZ TOUR' 09. A full U.S. tour from November 4, 2009, to December 12, 2009.

In May 2010, Fight Fair performed at Bled Fest. They then played the entire Warped Tour from June 24 to August 15, performing on the Skull Candy Stage. Fight Fair released "California Kicks" on the 2010 Vans Warped Tour. It was released while the tour was in the city of Phoenix, Arizona.

They recorded their final EP "Broken" with producer Sam Pura. It was released digitally May 17, 2011.

== Discography ==
=== Splits ===
- Winter Bloo: An Aural Companion to Side A 2007 split with Get Back Loretta From Poseur Ink

=== EPs ===
- xFashionx (2007)
- Settle the Score (2008)
- Broken (2011)

=== Albums ===
- California Kicks (2010)
