= Sam Means =

Sam Means may refer to:

- Sam Means (musician), American musician
- Sam Means (writer), American comedy writer
