= Peachcake =

American electronic music group

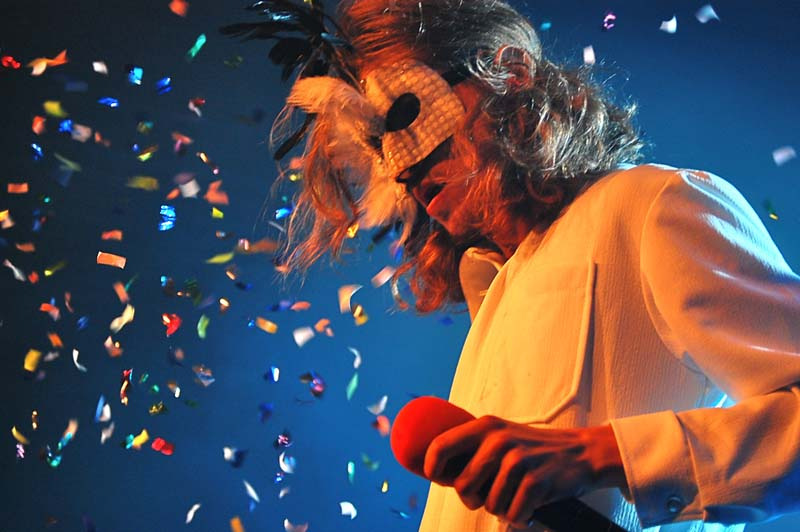
- Stefan Pruett of Peachcake performing in July 2009

Background information
- Origin: Phoenix, Arizona
- Genres: Electronic, indie, power pop
- Years active: 2003–2013, 2022
- Label: The Planet Awesome!
- Members: Mike McHale
- Past members: Stefan Pruett (deceased); David Jackman; John O'Keefe
- Website: instagram.com/peachcake

Peachcake is an American electronic group from Phoenix, Arizona.

== History ==
=== Early years ===
Originally conceived by Stefan Pruett and John O'Keefe as an informal project with the aim of experimenting with electronic music, Peachcake developed into a national touring band. They originally did not plan to last longer than three shows, including a dismal first show at a small night club where the band was gated off from the audience.

Peachcake released their first EP, titled Chain Letter EP, in 2004 and garnered local success in Arizona, including the cover feature of the Phoenix New Times and playing with several large national acts including Explosions in the Sky, Of Montreal, and The Go! Team. The band started touring in mid-2005 all throughout the West Coast, the South and the Midwest. Some on their own and some with other indie bands and friends Femme Fatality, Less Pain Forever, and Adam Panic.

In the latter part of 2006, Peachcake joined forces with Jim Adkins' label, Western Tread Recordings, to release a split EP along with local Arizona band Less Pain Forever. In October, the band landed an opening slot on Hellogoodbye's national headlining tour. During the tour, the band signed to indie record label, Sidecho Records, to release their debut full length, What Year Will You Have The World?..

Though the band was scheduled to release their full length in the mid-2007, the release date was pushed back several times throughout the year due to several extensions to finish the album and their continuous touring schedule. Upon completion of What Year Will You Have The World?.. in early 2008, the band parted ways with Sidecho Records and later released the album with the help of Warner Music Group/ADA and Los Angeles based production company, Subtractive, through their own imprint label called The Planet Awesome! on November 18, 2008. The group toured in the beginning of 2009 to support the album playing shows with MC Lars, Danger Radio, The Scene Aesthetic, Young The Giant, Get Back Loretta and Dear and the Headlights, as well as appearances at Daytrotter, Canadian Music Week and Bamboozle Left.

On March 20, 2009, Peachcake were made honorary members of the International Peace Bureau for their efforts to promote tolerance, peace and love through music and live performance.

=== 2009-2013: Unbelievable Souls ===
In April 2009, longtime member John O'Keefe left the group to pursue other endeavors. Shortly after his leaving, Pruett along with guitarist Mike McHale started writing new material with Phoenix-based songwriter and beat producer, David Jackman. The three continued writing songs throughout the rest of 2009 and the first half of 2010. During that time, Peachcake expanded the live band with various live players to experiment with their live show including performances at Vans Warped Tour, Cleveland's Ingenuity Fest, Norway's Slottsfjell Festival, Arizona's Fall Frenzy and Phoenix Comicon.

In May 2010, Peachcake contributed a new song called "The Soundtrack Of A Revolution!" to the Phoenix New Times compilation, A Line In The Sand: A Compilation Of SB 1070 Protest Songs, which featured local Arizona artists that opposed the Arizona SB 1070 immigration bill.

After a year of writing new songs, the band entered the studio with producer/engineer Jalipaz at Audioconfusion in Mesa, AZ in June 2010 to record a new album, which would later be titled Unbelievable Souls. After finishing recording in July 2010, the album was sent off to New York City to be mixed by mixing engineer Alex Aldi and mastered by Greg Calbi, senior mastering engineer at Sterling Sound.

On April 12, 2011, "Were We Ever Really Right?", a new song to be featured on Unbelievable Souls, was selected by the International Peace Bureau and Demilitarize.org as the official song for the Global Day of Action on Military Spending, a worldwide event to support demilitarization across the globe.

On May 3, 2011, Peachcake released a five-song EP titled This Wasn't Our Plan that included three songs from Unbelievable Souls, a demo of a new song and a remix done by DJ Semuta. The single "You Matter" was released a week prior on their website.

"You Matter" was featured during the TNT television show, HawthoRNe, during the episode, "A Fair To Remember". The episode aired on July 5, 2011.

Since the release of This Wasn't Our Plan, Peachcake has performed with and supported many national acts both locally in Arizona and on tour in the past few months, including shows with Cage The Elephant, Future Islands, Peter Murphy, She Wants Revenge, Washed Out, Neon Trees, Meat Puppets, T. Mills, Japanther, and Electric Guest.

Peachcake's single "You Matter" was featured on Paul Frank's Academy Of Awesome compilation showcasing bands that had performed during Paul Frank's Academy Of Awesome Summer Tour. The album was released on November 22, 2011, on Paul Frank Records through iTunes and Amazon.

In July 2012, Peachcake performed at the ten-year anniversary of Slottsfjell in Tønsberg, Norway, featuring New Order, Janelle Monáe, Friendly Fires, Wolfmother, Chase & Status, Noah & The Whale and more.

On July 31, Peachcake announced that their new album, Unbelievable Souls, would be released on September 25 and unveiled the first single, "The World Is Our Platform To Mean Something", on their website.

On September 25, 2012, Peachcake digitally released their album, Unbelievable Souls, along with the music video for "The World Is Our Platform To Mean Something".

Their last show was April 13, 2013, at Crescent Ballroom in Phoenix, AZ. The group has been inactive since then.

=== 2020-2022: Pruett's Death and Legacy ===
On June 14, 2020, founding member Stefan Pruett had died due to apparent heart failure. Born with a congenital heart condition, Pruett had survived three open-heart surgeries and had lived all his life with a pacemaker. He was found in his Los Angeles apartment by friend and collaborator Jeremy Dawson. Dawson said that Pruett's pacemaker was due for a tune-up earlier this year but that his appointment kept getting pushed back due to the COVID-19 crisis.

Mike McHale, Peachcake band member and longtime friend of Pruett, coordinated a memorial charity concert honoring Stefan on January 15, 2022, at Crescent Ballroom in Phoenix, AZ. The event brought together friends and family of Stefan to celebrate his life and all of the music that he had created in his lifetime, including a performance by Forrest Kline of Hellogoodbye, Jeremy Dawson of Shiny Toy Guns showcasing the music of Pruett's final project, The Guidance, and McHale along with past band members performing the music of Peachcake.

== Members ==
- Mike McHale – guitar, synthesizers, percussion, vocals

== Past members ==
- Stefan Pruett – lead vocals, percussion, drums (2003–2013, died 2020)
- John O'Keefe – vocals, beats, programming, guitar, bass, synthesizers, melodica, piano, keytar (2003–2009)
- David Jackman – programming, beats, production, soft synths, vocals (2009–2013)

=== Touring Members / Players ===
- David Halicky – drums, percussion (2005–2006, 2008)
- Jessy Meeker – bass guitar, percussion (2005–2006)
- Jeremiah Gratza – mascot, percussion, band manager (2004–2007)
- Jake Ricker – audio effects, percussion (2005–2006)
- Tanner Menard – audio effects (2006)
- Samantha Diaz - vocals (2006)
- Joshua Carro – drums, percussion (2007)
- Michael Kraft – mascot, keyboards, percussion, vocals (2008-2011, 2022)
- Johnny McHone – keyboards, percussion, guitar, melodica, vocals (2008–2010, 2022)
- Harry Farrar – DJ, audio effects (2010–2011)
- Omni Rutledge – keyboards, keytar, bass guitar, vocoder (2010, 2022)
- Andrew Cline – bass guitar, bass synth, percussion, vocals (2011-2012)
- Henri Benard – drums, percussion (2012-2013)
- Jon Kabir – bass guitar (2022)

== Discography ==
=== Albums ===
- What Year Will You Have the World?.. (2008)
- Unbelievable Souls (2012)

=== EPs ===
- Chain Letter (2004)
- We Should've Never Released This (2006)
- This Wasn't Our Plan (2011)

=== Splits ===
- Now We Have Something to Celebrate with Less Pain Forever (2006)

=== Compilations ===
- Greatness Abound!: B-sides, Remixes, Demos, Alternate Versions & Live Recordings (2021)
