= Massachusetts Independent Comics Expo =

Massachusetts Independent Comics Expo (MICE)
- Status: Active
- Genre: Alternative comics convention
- Frequency: Annual
- Venue: Lesley University's University Hall (2011–2019); Boston University's Fuller Building (2022–present)
- Locations: Cambridge, Massachusetts (2011-2021); Brookline, Massachusetts (2022–present)
- Country: United States
- Inaugurated: 25 September 2010; 16 years ago
- Founder: Dan Mazur and Shelli Paroline
- Most recent: December 6–7, 2025
- Next event: 2026
- Attendance: 5,500
- Organizer: Boston Comics Roundtable/Lesley University (2010–2014); Boston Comic Arts Foundation (2015–present)
- Filing status: Nonprofit
- Website: micexpo.org

The Massachusetts Independent Comics Expo (widely known as MICE) is an annual comic book festival usually held each fall in the Boston area.

Inaugurated in 2010, the curated festival showcases graphic novels, comic books, minicomics, and zines created by independent artists and publishers. MICE focuses on the art of comics, and unlike traditional comic book conventions, does not feature cosplaying, collectibles, back-issue dealers, or mainstream superhero publishers. Instead, the show centers around an artist alley-style exhibition space that features roughly 240 vendors, as well as industry-related panel discussions.

From 2010–2020, MICE was co-sponsored by, and held on, the premises of Lesley University (located in Cambridge), usually in University Hall. Beginning in 2022, MICE became associated with Boston University, and has been held at the school's Fuller Building (located in Brookline). After holding MICE in the fall (most often October) from 2010 to 2023, the show has been scheduled in early December since 2024.

== History ==
The Massachusetts Independent Comics Expo was co-founded by Dan Mazur and Shelli Paroline, both of whom had been involved with the 2006 creation of the Boston Comics Roundtable. (MICE evolved from the 2008 Boston Zine Fair, which Mazur and Paroline helped organize.)

The first iteration of MICE, presented by the Boston Comics Roundtable and the Art Institute of Boston (part of Lesley University), was held on September 25, 2010, at the Art Institute of Boston in Cambridge. Notable exhibitors include Karl Stevens, Liz Prince, and Tim Fish.

In 2012, MICE hosted its first guest of honor, R. Sikoryak.

In 2013, the show expanded to two days. Notable special guests included Nick Abadzis, Lucy Knisley, and Josh Neufeld.

Special guests of the 2014 show included Raina Telgemeier, James Kochalka, Dave Roman, Emily Carroll, Paul Hornschemeier, and Box Brown. Notable guests at the 2015 MICE event included Lucy Knisley and Ryan North; guests of the 2017 show included Kazu Kibuishi, Michael DeForge, and Isabel Greenberg. Special guests of the 2018 MICE included Jim Woodring and Charles Forsman.

The 2019 show was MICE's 10th anniversary; notable guests includes Jaime Hernández and Erica Henderson.

The 2020 MICE was scheduled for October 17–18; the in-person event was cancelled due to the COVID-19 pandemic and rescheduled as a virtual convention held over the course of a couple of weekends in October.

Because of fears of the COVID Delta variant, the 2021 edition of MICE was rescheduled as an outdoor event and moved up to August (instead of the usual month of October). Dubbed "Mini-MICE," it was held August 28–29, 2021, at Starlight Square in Cambridge.

In 2022, MICE established a relationship with Boston University; the first full indoor show since 2019 was held at BU's Fuller Building; special guests include Maia Kobabe, Steenz, Jarrett J. Krosoczka, Dave Ortega, and Joel Christian Gill.

In 2024, MICE moved to a December weekend for the first time.

=== Event dates and locations ===
- 2010: September 25 — Art Institute of Boston, Cambridge, Massachusetts
- 2011: September 24 — University Hall, Lesley University, Cambridge
- 2012: September 29 — University Hall, Lesley University, Cambridge
- 2013: September 28–29 — University Hall, Lesley University, Cambridge
- 2014: October 4–5 — University Hall, Lesley University, Cambridge
- 2015: October 17–18 — University Hall, Lesley University, Cambridge
- 2016: October 29–30 — University Hall, Lesley University, Cambridge
- 2017: October 21-22 — University Hall, Lesley University, Cambridge
- 2018: October 21–22 — University Hall, Lesley University, Cambridge
- 2019: October 19–20 — University Hall, Lesley University, Cambridge
- 2020: ~~October 17–18 — University Hall, Lesley University, Cambridge~~ — rescheduled as virtual convention held over the course of a couple of weekends in October.
- 2021: August 28–29 ("Mini-MICE") — Starlight Square, Cambridge
- 2022: October 22-23 — Fuller Building, Boston University, Brookline, Massachusetts
- 2023: September 30–October 1 — Fuller Building, Boston University, Brookline
- 2024: December 7–8 — Fuller Building, Boston University, Brookline
- 2025: December 6–7 — Fuller Building, Boston University, Brookline
