= First Single =

First Single may refer to:

- The First (single album) by NCT Dream, 2017
- Big Bang (2006 single album), also known as Big Bang First Single
- "The First Single", a song by The Format from Interventions + Lullabies, 2003
