= Nate Ruess =

American singer (born 1982)

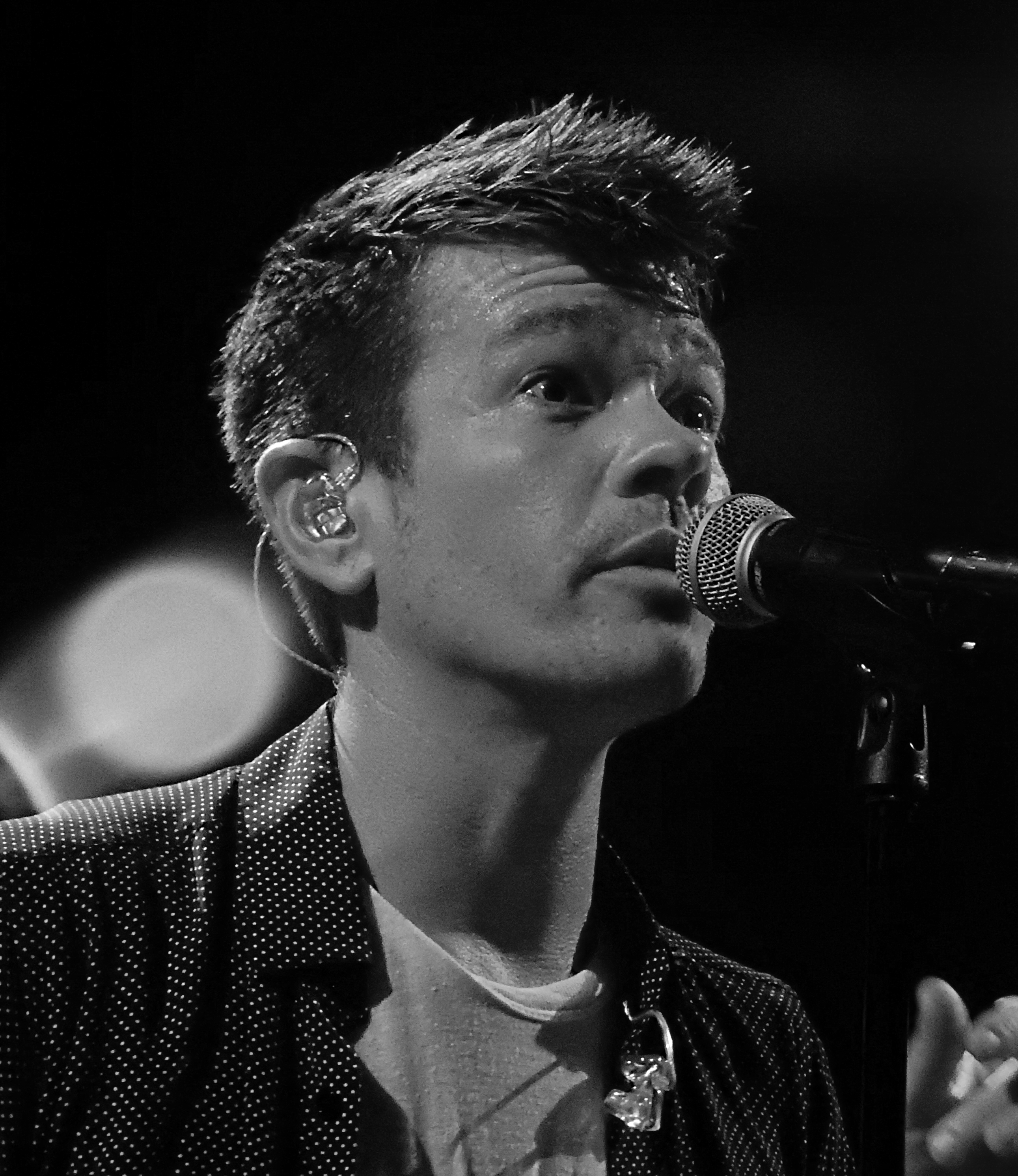
- Ruess performing in 2015

Background information
- Born: Nathaniel Joseph Ruess; February 26, 1982 (age 44); Iowa City, Iowa, U.S.
- Origin: Glendale, Arizona, U.S.
- Genres: Indie pop; alternative rock; indie rock; baroque pop
- Occupations: Singer; songwriter
- Instruments: Vocals; guitar; sampler; synthesizer; percussion
- Years active: 2000–present
- Label: Fueled by Ramen
- Member of: The Format
- Formerly of: Fun
- Website: nateruess.com

Signature
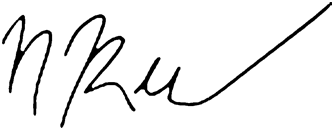

Nathaniel Joseph Ruess (pronounced /ruːs/ ROOSS; born February 26, 1982) is an American singer and songwriter. He formed the indie rock band The Format in 2002, and later went on to form the band fun. in 2008.

He emerged as a solo act with his guest performance on P!nk's 2013 single "Just Give Me a Reason", which earned two nominations at the 56th Annual Grammy Awards and won the MTV Video Music Award for Best Collaboration. His 2015 single, "Nothing Without Love", marked his first entry on the Billboard Hot 100 as a solo artist. It served as the lead single for his debut solo album, Grand Romantic (2015), which peaked at number seven on the Billboard 200 and saw positive critical response.

Ruess has also co-written a number of commercially successful singles, including "Die Young" by Kesha, "Stay the Night" by Zedd and Hayley Williams, "Walk Me Home" by Pink and with Keith Urban, Maroon 5 and Ellie Goulding. His songwriting work has earned him the Hal David Starlight Award at the 2015 Songwriters Hall of Fame.

== Early life ==
Ruess was born the second child of Larry Ruess and Bess Zinger. His uncle, John Ruess, was a performer on Broadway and served as an influence for Ruess's musical ventures.

In 1986, his family moved to a farm in Glendale, Arizona, due to repeated bouts of pneumonia Ruess faced as a child. Ruess's pneumonia and the move are referenced in the lyrics of the song "The Gambler". Ruess remained in Arizona throughout his childhood and attended Deer Valley High School graduating in 2000. During his time in school, Ruess played in punk bands and upon graduation chose to pursue music professionally. In an interview with American Songwriter Ruess states, "I'm not one to take lessons, so I decided that the only way I was going to learn how to sing, if what they were saying was true, was to go in my car and put on any sort of music from a vocalist that might be really hard to mimic, turn it on as loud as possible and try to hit all those notes". He took a job in a law firm as a way to support himself while he pursued his musical ambitions.

In 2002, at the age of 19, he launched the band the Format with his longtime best friend, Sam Means. The Format was his first musical endeavor to gain widespread attention.

== Career ==
=== 2002–2008: The Format ===
The Format debuted in 2002 with a five-song EP, titled EP, which generated local interest and led to the band being signed to Elektra Records the same year. They released their first studio album, Interventions + Lullabies, on October 21, 2003, leading to more local mainstream success. The band's fanbase began to grow, and the Format released their second EP, Snails, with Atlantic Records in April 2005. However, while working on their second album, Dog Problems, they were dropped from Atlantic. They eventually created their own label, The Vanity Label, and released the album on July 10, 2006. On February 4, 2008, Ruess announced through the band's blog that the Format would not be making another album.

=== 2008–2014: fun. ===
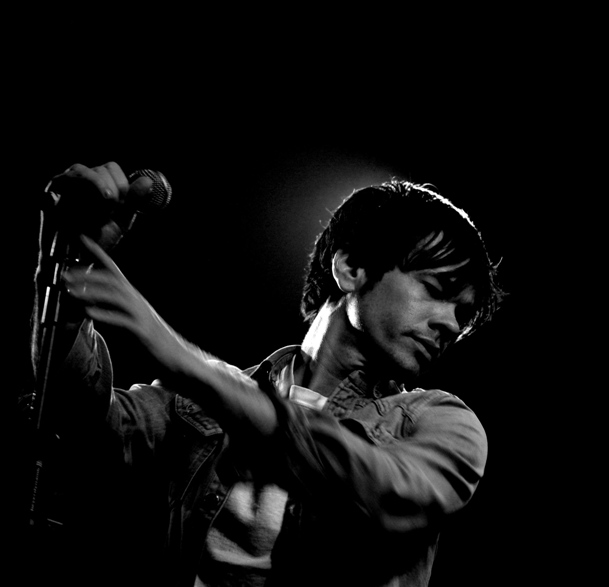
Ruess performing with Fun in March 2010.

Immediately after the split of the Format, Ruess contacted Jack Antonoff of Steel Train and Andrew Dost, formerly of Anathallo, to form a new band called fun. They released their first demo, "Benson Hedges", through Spin's September 20, 2009, article. Four months after releasing their first single, "At Least I'm Not as Sad (As I Used to Be)", through Myspace on April 6, 2009, Fun released their first studio album, entitled Aim and Ignite. The album received generally positive reviews and peaked at 71 on the Billboard 200.

The band's first tour happened in 2008 supporting Jack's Mannequin and gained exposure opening for them as well as Paramore in 2010. On August 4, 2010, Fun announced that they had been signed to the Fueled by Ramen label.

In 2011, in collaboration with the band Panic! at the Disco, the band released the single, "C'mon" with limited vinyl release.

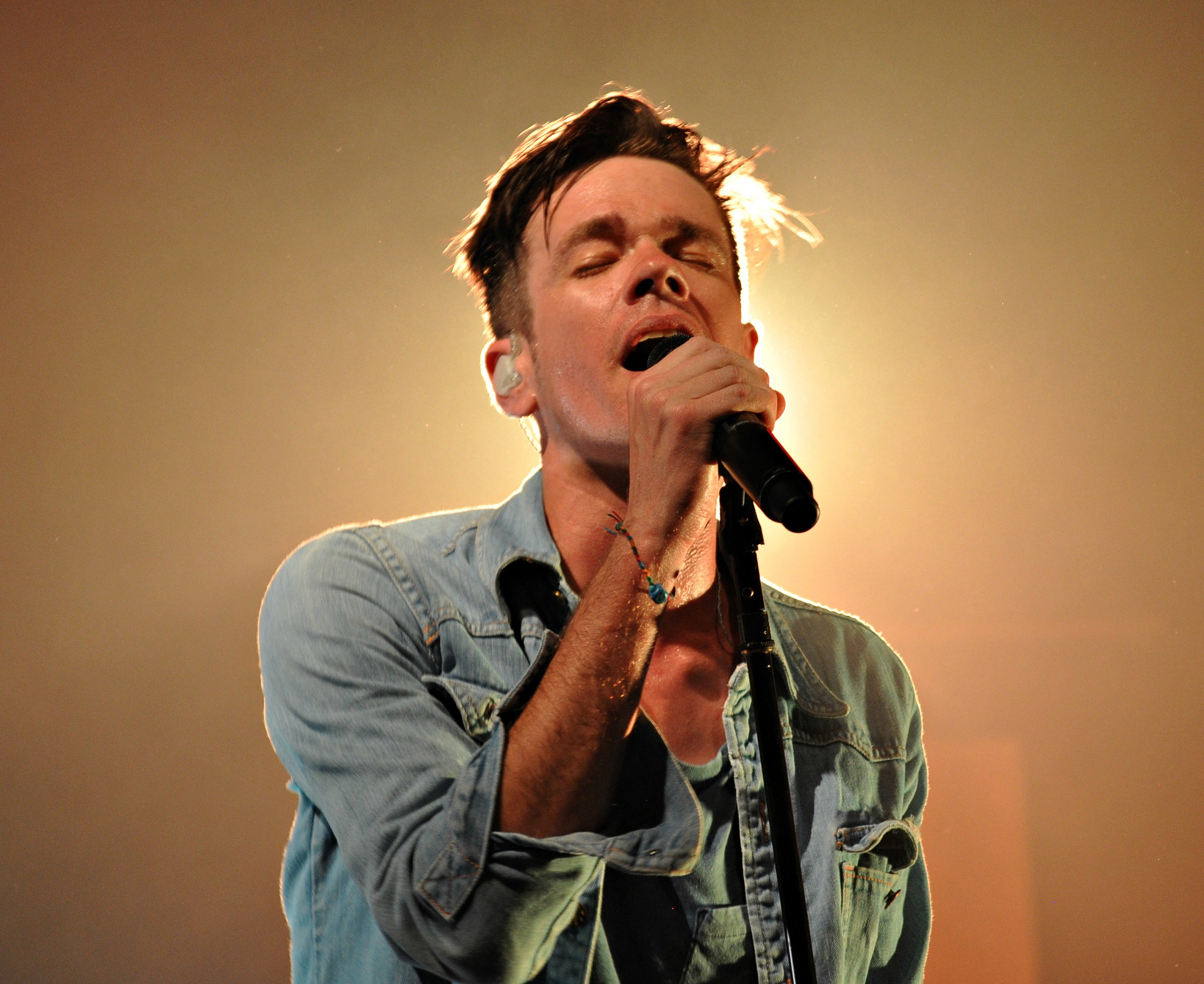
Ruess performing in Tucson, Arizona in March 2012.

Their second album, Some Nights, was released on February 21, 2012, and featured production by Jeff Bhasker. The album's first single, "We Are Young", which features guest singer Janelle Monáe, was released September 20, 2011. The song was covered on Glee in December 2011, featured in a Chevy Sonic commercial during the Super Bowl in February 2012, and reached number one on the Billboard Hot 100 on March 8, 2012. The album has become a success throughout the world, selling nearly three million copies. The album's title song, "Some Nights", reached number 3 on the Billboard Hot 100 and reached number 1 on the Alternative Songs chart.

On February 10, 2013, Fun won a Grammy for "We Are Young". Upon receiving the Grammy, Ruess commented, "I don't know what I was thinking writing the chorus for this song. If this is in HD, everyone can see our faces, and we are not very young. We've been doing this for 12 years, and I just got to say we could not do this without the help of all the fans that we've had keeping us afloat for the last 12 years." Fun also won the Grammy for Best New Artist.

Alongside Fun, Ruess had been a supporting vocalist for many different songs across genres. In 2012, he was featured on "Only Love" from Anthony Green's second solo album, Beautiful Things, and in 2013 was featured on Pink's album, The Truth About Love, in the song "Just Give Me a Reason". The song began as a simple songwriting session with Pink. She decided the song needed another side to it and subsequently a male part was written. While at first reluctant, with Pink encouraging him, he decided to participate in the duet. The song eventually topped the US Billboard Hot 100, becoming his first number-one single as a solo artist and his second overall. After the success of "Just Give Me a Reason", Ruess was featured on Eminem's eighth studio album The Marshall Mathers LP 2 on the track "Headlights". Many of Ruess' lyrics were borrowed from a previously unreleased track, "Jumping the Shark", written during the Aim and Ignite sessions.

In 2014, the band released the single "Sight of the Sun" for the HBO series Girls after being approached by show creator Lena Dunham.

On June 18, 2014, Fun debuted a new song on The Tonight Show Starring Jimmy Fallon called "Harsh Lights". It would be the last new Fun song performed before Ruess' pursuing his career as a solo artist. However the band has made it clear that they are on hiatus, not splitting up.

=== 2014–2017: Solo music projects ===
On February 5, 2015, Fun posted on their official website their status stating "there was no new Fun album in the works"; instead stating all three members were pursuing their own projects.

Fun was founded by the three of us at a time when we were coming out of our own bands. One thing that has always been so special about Fun is that we exist as three individuals in music who come together to do something collaborative. We make Fun records when we are super inspired to do so. Currently Nate is working on his first solo album, Andrew is scoring films, and Jack is on tour and working on Bleachers music. The three of us have always followed inspiration wherever it leads us. Sometimes that inspiration leads to Fun music, sometimes it leads to musical endeavors outside of Fun. We see all of it as part of the ecosystem that makes Fun, fun.

In an interview with Rolling Stone, Ruess added, "You get a little selfish about the songs that you write, and it's really hard to do that in a group setting, where there are two other people, and you have to think about everybody else's feelings. I'm writing and singing these songs about myself. When you work with producers versus bandmates, that line becomes a lot less blurry."

In addition to his solo album, Ruess was invited to perform on Brian Wilson's album No Pier Pressure. Wilson, who co-founded the Beach Boys, likened Ruess' voice to his deceased brother and former bandmate Carl Wilson. Ruess then contributed guest vocals to frequent collaborator Emile Haynie's 2015 release, We Fall. Ruess then released his first single from his debut album, titled Nothing Without Love, which was sent to the alternative radio on February 23, 2015.

On March 23, 2015, he made the first of multiple appearances, as a guest advisor on the eighth season on The Voice. On April 6, 2015, Ruess announced his debut album would be called Grand Romantic, and it was released on June 16, 2015. On April 27, 2015, Ruess released the opening track from his debut album, titled "AhHa".

In May 2015, he released another song, titled "Great Big Storm", in correlation with the announcement of his solo tour. The song "What The World is Coming To" features guest vocals from American singer-songwriter and musician Beck. It was released as part of the countdown to his new solo album. On May 31, 2015, Ruess made his live debut as a solo artist with his newly formed backup band called the Band Romantic. He performed in Utrecht, Netherlands, at the intimate Tivoli/Vredenburg Cloud Nine location. The set list consisted of the 3 released tracks from "Grand Romantic", several then-unheard tracks from the same album, and songs from Fun such as "Some Nights", "We Are Young", and "Carry On". He also performed "Just Give Me a Reason". On June 1, 2015, Ruess released a new track from his solo album "Grand Romantic", titled "What This World Is Coming To".

On January 1, 2016, Ruess played during the 1st period intermission at the NHL Winter Classic in Foxboro, Massachusetts. On January 12, 2016, he released a music video for his song "Take It Back" starring actor Patrick Fischler and also features a guitar solo from Jeff Tweedy of the band Wilco.

=== 2018–present: Songwriting and podcast host ===
In 2018, Ruess was credited as a composer and lyricist for Keith Urban on his release Graffiti U. He helped write Urban's track "Way Too Long". Additionally, Ruess has been working as a songwriter and producer. In 2019, he collaborated again with Pink for the track "Walk Me Home", which was released in February for her eighth studio album, called Hurts 2B Human. In 2020, Ruess had songwriting credits on Halsey's Manic and Kesha's High Road.

On February 3, 2020, Ruess and Sam Means performed a surprise acoustic set together in place of a promised live screening of the Format's 2007 concert film Live at the Mayan Theatre, the first time the duo performed in almost six years. The band subsequently announced reunion shows in Chicago, Phoenix and New York City. Due to the COVID-19 pandemic, the tour was postponed multiple times before it was ultimately canceled. Hayley Williams from Paramore believes that Nate secretly used a moniker Benjamin Eli Hanna to co-write the song "Stay the Night".

In November 2021, he appeared on Saturday Night Live as part of musical guest Young Thug's performance of "Love You More." The same year Ruess launched ClayneCast, a podcast about the Lethal Weapon TV series, with his accomplice Drew of the podcast Globe Hell Warning, and his friend, ChapoFYM co-host Tom. It can be found on Spotify, Apple Podcasts, Soundcloud as well as bonus video content on Patreon. As of 2023, the podcast has covered the entire three seasons of the Lethal Weapon TV series, all 4 Lethal Weapon movies, as well as all episodes of the crime-mystery show Houdini & Doyle. In 2024, the show started its fifth season. This season started out as a re-watch of the Lethal Weapon TV series, but after 13 episodes was abandoned in favor of watching the Mission: Impossible series of films.

In 2023, Ruess collaborated with the hosts of the podcasts Episode One, Chapo Trap House, and Podcast About List to create the E1 exclusive Sodas, stylized as a 110-minute podcast audio-only film lampooning common tropes in children's animated media. Ruess provided vocals alongside Raina Douris on the episode-exclusive track "All the Bubbles in the World", though he remained uncredited in the public-facing marketing of the episode. His involvement was confirmed by posts on the Episode One Patreon page. He also appeared in Episode One's scripted episode "The Ballad of Brewer Grouse" as Soap Weathers, a folk musician who makes music for infants and the nemesis of the title character. He wrote and performed an original song called "The Sun's Birthday" for the episode.

== Personal life ==
From 2009 to 2013, Ruess dated fashion designer Rachel Antonoff, the sister of Fun guitarist Jack Antonoff. Rachel and Ruess both provided backing vocals for the song "Dakota" from the 2007 album Trampoline by Jack's band Steel Train. Later, Rachel sang on some Fun songs and appeared in the video for "We Are Young". Rachel and Ruess collaborated on The Ally Coalition, an activist project to raise awareness of LGBTQ issues.

Ruess began dating English fashion designer Charlotte Ronson in March 2014. They had their first child, a son, in early 2017. They got married October 21, 2017. They had their second child, a daughter, in March 2019. They adopted their third child, another daughter, in July 2023.

Ruess has stated that Drew and Tom, his co-hosts on ClayneCast, are his best friends.

== Discography ==
=== Solo albums ===
Title	Details	Peak chart positions								
Title	Details	US	US Alt	US Rock	AUS	CAN	ITA	JPN	SWI	UK DL
Grand Romantic	Released: June 16, 2015; Label: Fueled by Ramen (549145); Format: CD, cassette, digital download, LP	7	1	1	61	16	94	65	56	42

=== Singles ===
==== As lead artist ====
Title	Year	Peak chart positions										Album
Title	Year	US	US Adult	US Alt	US Pop	US Rock	BEL (FL) Tip	CAN	CAN AC	JPN	SWE Heat	Album
"Nothing Without Love"	2015	77	14	24	32	6	88	90	—	82	6	Grand Romantic
"AhHa"	2015	—	—	—	—	—	—	—	—	—	—	Grand Romantic
"Great Big Storm"	2015	—	30	—	—	—	—	—	48	—	—	Grand Romantic
"What This World Is Coming To" (featuring Beck)	2015	—	—	—	—	— (Note: "What This World Is Coming To" did not enter the US Hot Rock & Alternative Songs chart, but did peak at number 43 on the Rock Digital Song Sales chart.)	—	—	—	—	—	Grand Romantic
"—" denotes a single that did not chart or was not released in that territory.

==== As featured artist ====
Title	Year	Peak chart positions										Certifications	Album
Title	Year	US	AUS	BEL (FL)	CAN	GER	IRE	NZ	SWE	SWI	UK	Certifications	Album
"Just Give Me a Reason" (Pink featuring Nate Ruess)	2013	1	1	2	1	1	1	1	1	2	2	RIAA: 4× Platinum; ARIA: 12× Platinum; BPI: 3× Platinum; BVMI: 3× Gold; FIMI: 3× Platinum; GLF: 3× Platinum; IFPI AUT: Platinum; IFPI SWI: 2× Platinum; MC: Diamond; RMNZ: 3× Platinum	The Truth About Love
"Headlights" (Eminem featuring Nate Ruess)	2014	45	21	— (Note: "Headlights" did not enter the Flanders Ultratop 50, but peaked at 49 on the Flanders Ultratip chart.)	54	—	60	—	—	—	66	RIAA: Platinum; ARIA: 2× Platinum; BPI: Silver	The Marshall Mathers LP 2
"Hands" (with various artists)	2016	—	—	—	—	—	—	—	—	—	—		Non-album singles
"I Want to Know What Love Is" (re-release) (Foreigner featuring Nate Ruess)	2016	—	—	—	—	—	—	—	—	—	—		Non-album singles
"—" denotes a single that did not chart or was not released in that territory.

=== Guest appearances ===
List of non-single guest appearances, showing other artist(s), year released and album name
Title	Year	Other artist(s)	Album
"My Sacrifice"	2002	The Hot Guy Band	Let's Do Coke In The Bathroom
"It's For The Best"	2004	Straylight Run	Straylight Run
"Kill Monsters In The Rain"	2007	Steel Train	Trampoline
"Only Love"	2012	Anthony Green	Beautiful Things
"Fool Me Too"	2015	Emile Haynie	We Fall
"Saturday Night"	2015	Brian Wilson	No Pier Pressure
"Angel In The Snow"	2016	Joyce Manor	Cody
"Love You More"	2021	Young Thug, Gunna, Jeff Bhasker	Punk
"Global Access"	2023	Young Thug	Business Is Business
