= Jim Mahfood =

American comics creator (b. 1975)

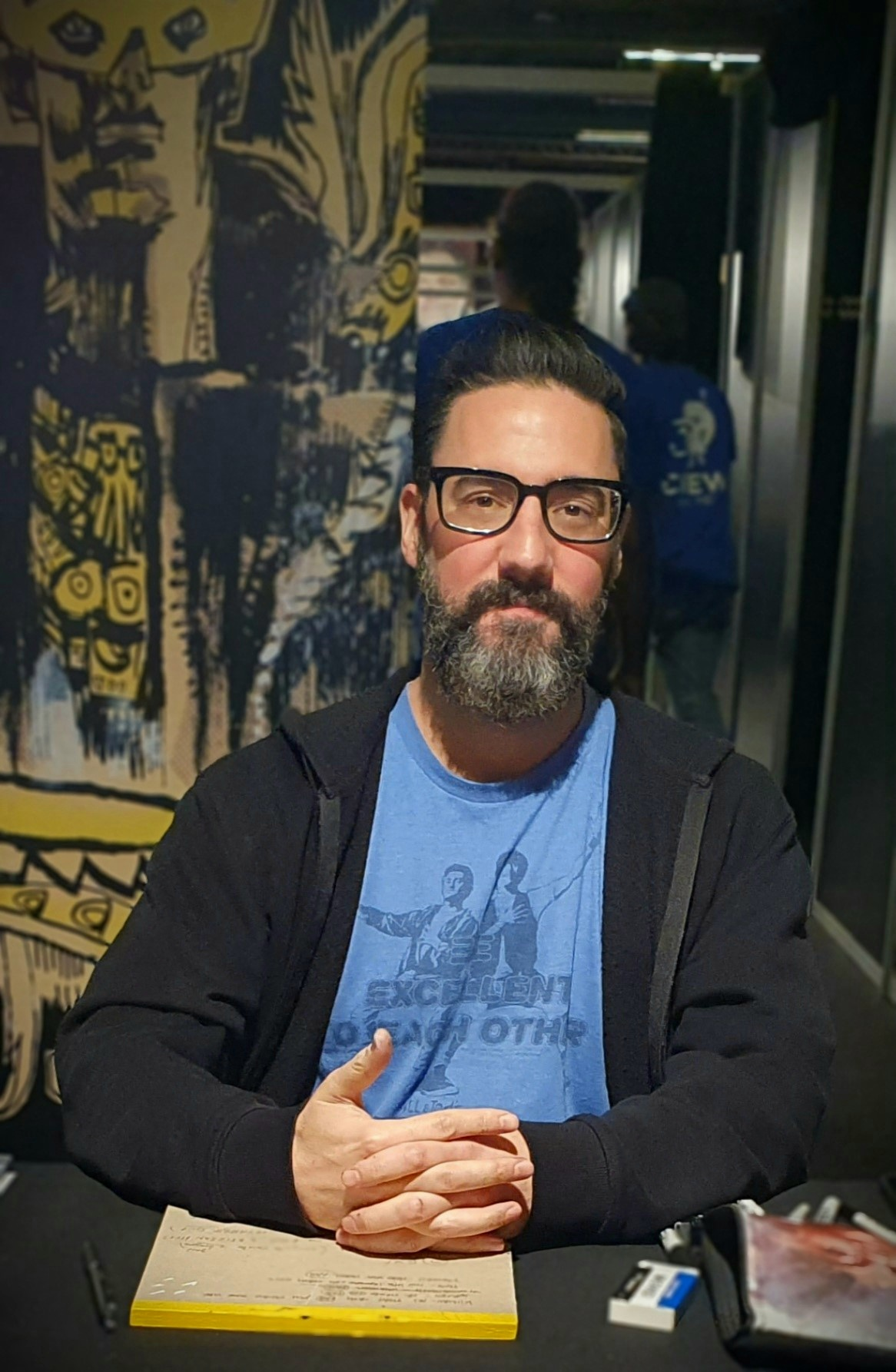
- Jim Mahfood on the Belgian convention FACTS in 2023
- Born: March 29, 1975 (age 51) St. Louis, Missouri, United States
- Areas: Writer, Penciller, Inker, Letterer
- Pseudonym: Food One

Jim Mahfood (born March 29, 1975), a.k.a. Food One, is an American comic book creator.

Apart from his creator-owned comic book series Grrl Scouts and his comic strip Stupid Comics (which appears weekly in the Phoenix New Times), he also did work for Marvel Comics on various Spider-Man titles, including Ultimate Marvel Team-Up and Spectacular Spider-Man.

His big break came when Oni Press hired him to illustrate two comic books based on Kevin Smith's movie Clerks from scripts by Smith, following his work on Marvel Comics Generation X Underground Special.

== Career ==
At the age of 18 Mahfood attended the Kansas City Art Institute, where he met Mike Huddleston and formed 40 Oz Comics.

He graduated with a Bachelor of Fine Arts degree in 1997 and went on to produce many comics with his own unique style, heavily influenced by graffiti and underground hip hop culture. He frequently features his characters wearing T-shirts promoting local or underground hip hop, funk, jazz or punk bands. Mahfood himself is heavily involved in his local music scene, often doing live mural art during hip hop and DJ events. Mahfood also contributed to the anthology Side B: The Music Lover's Comic Anthology by Poseur Ink. In his contribution, he talks about his appreciation for experimental musician Gary Wilson.

In 2008, Mahfood was commissioned to supply all of the art and ads for that year's Colt 45 (malt liquor) ad campaign.

== Bibliography ==
- Clerks (written by Kevin Smith)
- Clerks Holiday Special (written by Kevin Smith)
- Grrl Scouts
- Grrl Scouts: Work Sucks
- 40 Oz Collected
- Classic 40 oz: Tales from the brown bag
- Bad Ideas (collaboration with Wayne Chinsang and Dave Crosland)
- Putting the Backbone Back
- Felt: True tales of underground hip hop
- The Further Adventures of One Page Filler Man
- Carl, The Cat That Makes Peanut Butter Sandwiches
- Mixtape Art Book (3 Volumes)
- You Only Live Twice: The Audio Graphic Novel by MF Grimm (artwork and 13-page comic book)
- Jennifer's Body (graphic novel)
- Kickpuncher by Troy Barnes (as illustrator)
- Side B: The Music Lover's Graphic Novel (anthology contribution, published by Poseur Ink in 2009)
- Marijuana Man (collaboration with Ziggy Marley and Joe Casey)
- Everybody Loves Tank Girl (2012)
