= Poseur Ink =

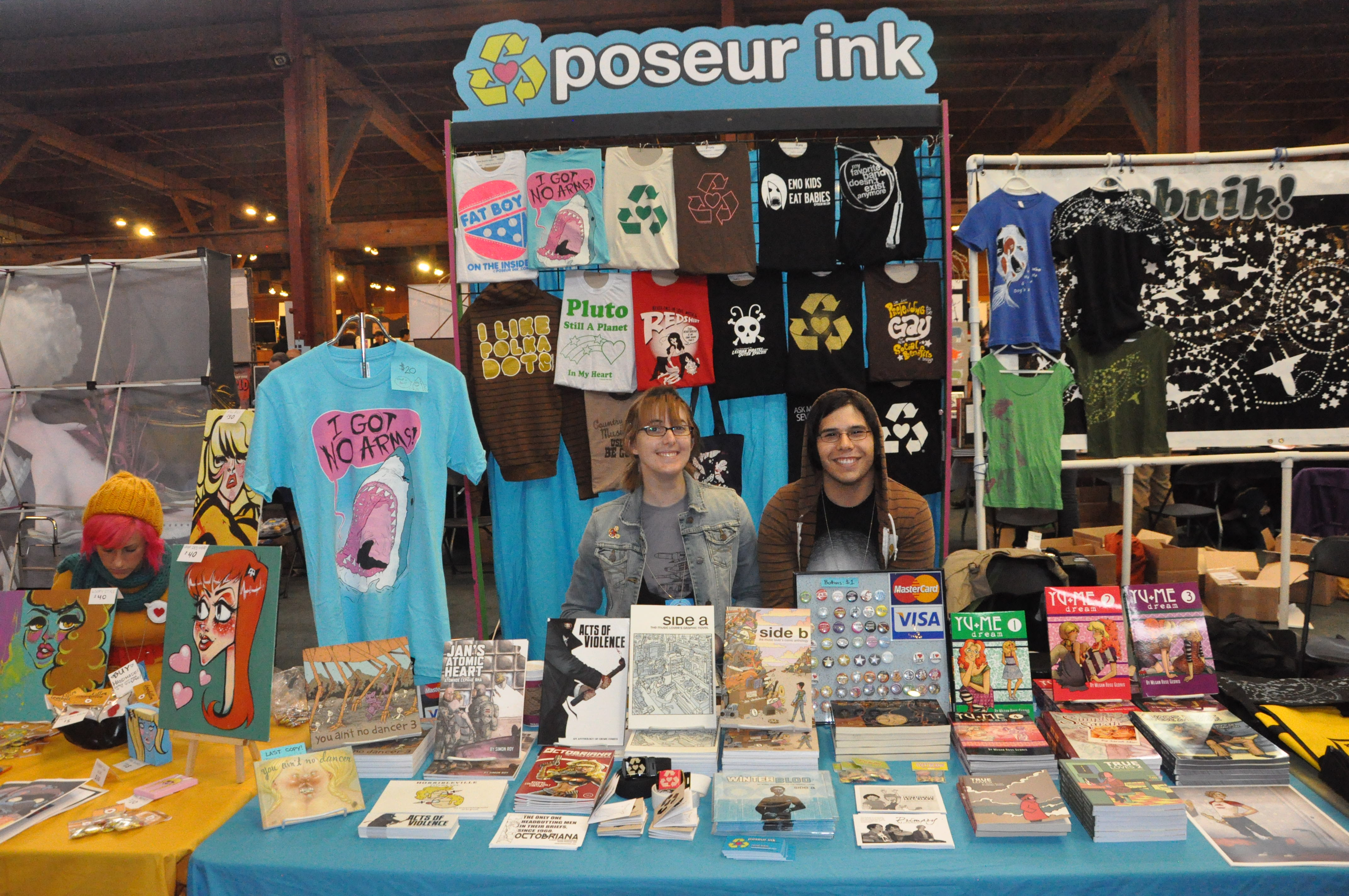
Rachel Dukes and Mike Lopez of Poseur Ink tabling at APE 2010.

Poseur Ink (2003-2013) was a small-press publisher and distro by comic artist Rachel Dukes. Based in San Diego, California the company specialized in independent comics, zines, buttons, and novelty T-shirts.

During that time Poseur Ink published collections of Dukes' journal comic "Intentionally Left Blank" and the anthologies "Side A: The Music Lover's Graphic Novel" and "Side B: The Music Lovers Comic Anthology". Poseur Ink also distributed work by indie cartoonists Megan Rose Gedris, Colleen Frakes, Box Brown, Josh PM Frees, and Ed Brisson.

Their comics are still sold online and in comic book shops in North America, distributed by Diamond Distributors and Tony Shenton. Their shirts were sold nationally: legally by Hot Topic and later illegally by several big box stores until served with cease and desists.

"'Poseur Ink'" tabled at many conventions annually, including: Comic Con International, Alternative Press Expo, Wondercon, MoCCA, Emerald City Comicon, and TCAF.

The company dissolved the summer of 2013. Dukes still creates comics regularly: both self-published (under the name Mixtape Comics) and for larger, licensed titles (Adventure Time, Garfield, Steven Universe).

== Mod Buttons ==
In conjunction with Poseur Ink, Dukes also ran the custom badge/button website Mod Buttons where she created custom merchandise for other artists/companies such as: NIS America, John Fluevog Shoes, Saddle Creek Record, and VampireFreaks. Mod Buttons shut down in the summer of 2013.

== Side A ==
In April 2007 the company released its first compilation graphic novel, entitled Side A: The Music Lover's Graphic Novel. The theme is how music has played an influential part in the life of each artist and the creative process. The book features contributions from Ben Snakepit, Sarah Shay and Corey Marie Parkhill (Creator of Scene Language and Life's So Rad), Tod Parkhill, Rachel Dukes, and Liz Greenfield (Creator of Stuff Sucks).

Side A was featured in the late March (2007) issue of The Comics Journal, in an article spotlighting upcoming publications being sold at the Alternative Press Expo in San Francisco.

To coincide with the release of the book, a seven-inch vinyl record was released featuring local San Diego bands Get Back Loretta and Fight Fair. Limited to 1000 copies, the record contained one song from each band. There are 150 on light blue marble vinyl and 850 on black.

In July, the T-shirt competition website Threadless gave away ten copies of the book to its users, introducing their users to Poseur Ink's other products such as shirts and comics.

Side A was featured in the October 2007 issue of Alternative Press (music magazine), and the issues 40 and 41 of Razorcake Magazine.

== Side B ==
Poseur Ink's second anthology about the influence that music has on the creative process. Almost twice the size of Side A, Side B contains stories by comic staples like Jim Mahfood, Jeffrey Brown, and Ryan Kelly; as well as Xeric Grant winners: Box Brown, Colleen Frakes and many others. Released in June 2009, the book was favorably reviewed by the vast majority of those who picked it up. Johanna Draper Carlson (Comics Worth Reading) said it was "the best anthology [she had] read this year," in her 2009 MoCCA report. The music e-zine Absolute Punk gave away three copies of the book to its users, introducing their users to Poseur Ink's other comics and products.

- Format: Trade Paperback, 232 pages
- Pre-order: Diamond Order Code APR090973
- In Stores: June 3, 2009
- Price: US$22.99
- ISBN 978-0-615-22080-2

Contains stories by:
Andy Jewett, Beck Kramer, Box Brown, Brandon Graham, Brian Butler, Cathy Johnson, Colleen Frakes, Cordus Holdenmauer, Cristy C. Road, Dave Crosland, Dino Caruso, Dmitri Jackson, Dominique Ferland, Ed Choy Moorman, Elizabeth Gearheart, Fickle Pixie, Gary Beatty, Grant Reynolds, Greg Khmara, Jamie Campbell, Jason "JFish" Fischer, Jason Marcy, Joe Meyer, Jeffrey Brown, Jim Mahfood, Joe Decie, Joe Laquinte, John Cei Douglas, John Isaacson, John Robbins, Jon Chad, Jon Sperry, Jonathan Bass, Jonathan Baylis, Joshua Kemble, Joshua Rosen, Katie Shanahan, Lars Brown, Lawrence Gullo, Liz Baillie, Lucy Knisley, Madeleine Flores, Megan Rose Gedris, Mike Lopez, Mitch Clem, Morgan Pielli, Ned Hugar, Nicole Miles, Noah Van Sciver, Patricio Betteo, R.S. Carbonneau, Rachel Dukes, Rob Guillory, Ryan Kelly, Sean Azzopardi, Steve Orlando, Tim Hengeveld, T.J. Kirsch, Todd Webb, Uriel A. Durán, Warren Wucinich
