= Nothing Without Love =

2015 single by Nate Ruess

Single by Nate Ruess

from the album Grand Romantic
- Released: February 23, 2015
- Genre: Rock
- Length: 3:58
- Label: Fueled By Ramen
- Songwriter(s): Jeff Bhasker; Emile Haynie; Josh Klinghoffer; Nate Ruess
- Producer(s): Jeff Bhasker; Emile Haynie

Nate Ruess singles chronology
"Headlights" (2014)	"Nothing Without Love" (2015)	""AhHa"" (2015)

"Nothing Without Love" is the debut single by American singer Nate Ruess from his debut solo studio album Grand Romantic. The song was released on February 23, 2015 via Fueled By Ramen. The song impacted modern rock radio on March 3, 2015.

== Background ==
In the spring of 2014, Ruess was in the studio with producer Jeff Bhasker recording a demo for what was planned to be an upcoming fun. song. However, Ruess' band fun. announced on February 5, 2015 via Facebook that the band was taking a hiatus for its members to pursue other projects. Ruess announced in a Rolling Stone interview the following day that he planned to start a solo singing career. On February 18, Ruess released a teaser of his new single via his own YouTube channel. The full song was released five days later via Fueled by Ramen. Its iTunes chart sale were within the iTunes Top 40, peaking at 31 on 4/24/15.

== Composition ==
While composing the song, Ruess was unable to think of lyrics. Ruess turned to singing about recent events in his life, stating that "it felt so believable; I was saying what I was thinking." Ruess continued, stating that "this is the first time I've been comfortable in my own skin, and it's with someone who's comfortable in their own skin."

== Promotion ==
On May 12, 2015, Ruess performed "Nothing Without Love" on The Tonight Show Starring Jimmy Fallon.

On July 31, 2015, Ruess performed the song on X Factor Indonesia.

== Chart performance ==
=== Weekly charts ===
Chart (2015)	Peak position
Belgium (Ultratip Bubbling Under Flanders)	93
Sweden Heatseeker (Sverigetopplistan)	6
US Billboard Hot 100	77
US Hot Rock & Alternative Songs (Billboard)	6
US Rock Airplay (Billboard)	36
US Adult Contemporary (Billboard)	27
US Adult Pop Airplay (Billboard)	14
US Pop Airplay (Billboard)	32

=== Year-end charts ===
Chart (2015)	Position
US Billboard Hot Rock Songs	23
US Billboard Rock Digital Songs	32
