= The Format =

American indie rock band

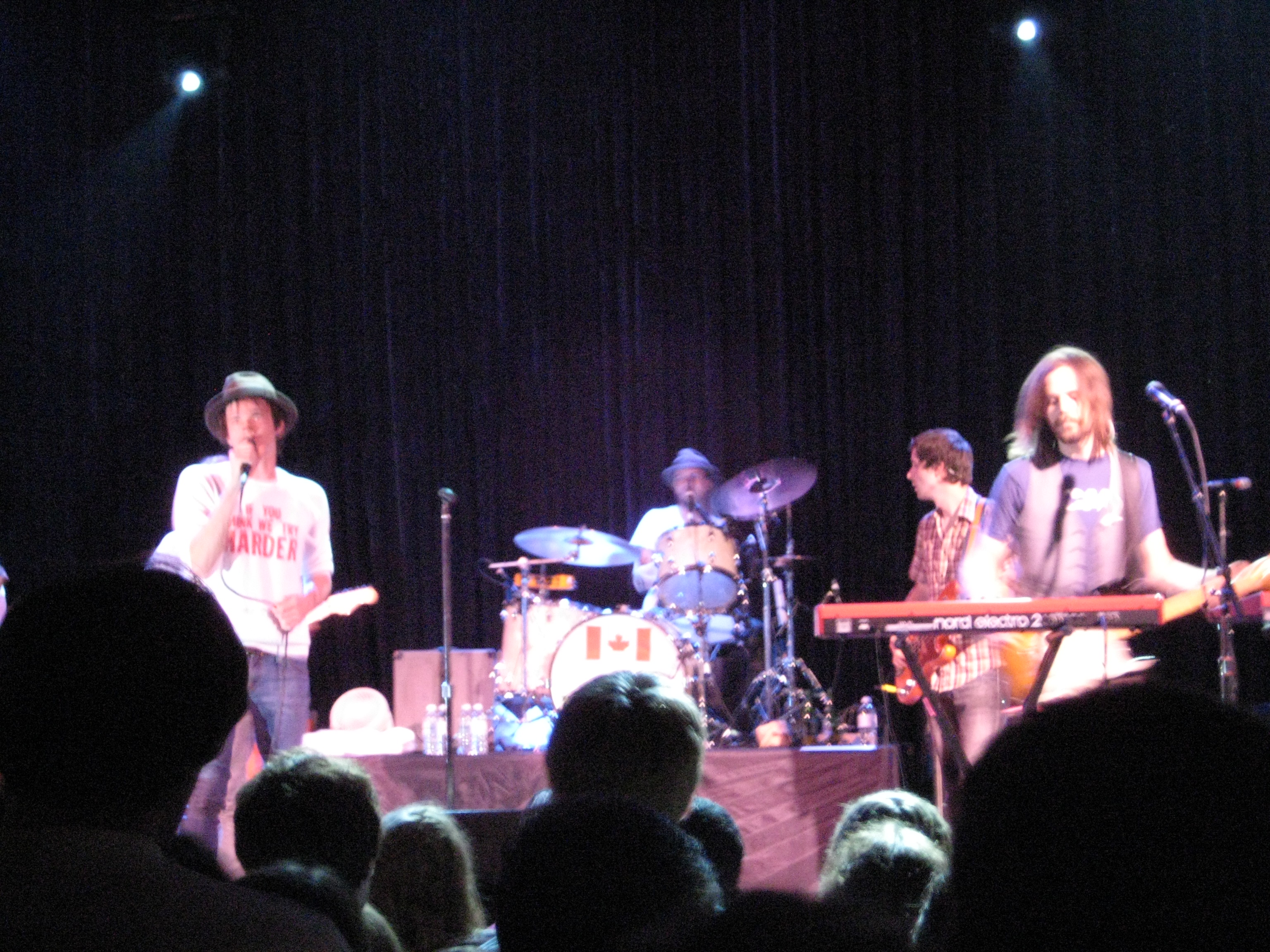
- The Format performing in 2007 at the Opera House in Toronto

Background information
- Origin: Peoria, Arizona, U.S.
- Genres: Indie pop; indie rock
- Years active: 2002–2008; 2020–2022; 2025–present
- Labels: Western Tread; Elektra; Atlantic
- Spinoffs: fun., Destry
- Members: Sam Means; Nate Ruess
- Past members: (see Band members section for others)
- Website: theformat.com

The Format is an American indie rock band, formed by vocalist Nate Ruess and multi-instrumentalist Sam Means. Their style has been considered a mixture of indie, alternative, punk and folk music, with elements of 1960s and 1970s pop music. The Format chose their name to make fun of the music industry's inclination towards a cookie-cutter "format" for a hit single. Formed in 2002, the band released two studio albums before announcing a hiatus on February 4, 2008. On February 4, 2020, they announced a return from their hiatus for a tour of special shows that were later cancelled due to the pandemic. In 2025, the band reunited for a second time and announced their third studio album, Boycott Heaven, which was released on January 23, 2026.

== History ==
Before forming The Format in February 2002, Means and Ruess, who had been friends since grade school, formed the band Nevergonnascore and released the EP "The Byron Sessions" which had generated some record label interest but not a deal.

The duo's first single, aptly titled "The First Single" from their five-song demo, EP, became locally popular on Phoenix radio station KEDJ and led to the duo signing with Elektra Records in 2002. Their first studio album, Interventions + Lullabies, recorded and produced by R. Walt Vincent and released in October 2003, was very successful around the Phoenix area. The band's fan base grew due to word of mouth, the Internet, and extensive touring. The album sold over 100,000 copies in the US.

After Elektra folded, The Format released a second EP, Snails, with sister label Atlantic Records in April 2005. As they began to work on their second full-length album, they drew on the influences of 1970s pop music, including Harry Nilsson, Electric Light Orchestra and The Beach Boys, and decided to collaborate with Redd Kross founder Steven Shane McDonald whom they brought on as record producer. But Atlantic Records executives were not impressed by the 1970s-pop-influenced demos and released The Format from its contract. Upon completing the album, Dog Problems, Ruess and Means, with help from their management company, decided to release it themselves through their newly established imprint label: The Vanity Label. Two months prior to the album's release, an MP3 version was leaked to the internet. In response, The Format decided to make the album immediately available digitally for only $7.99 via the Nettwerk Music Store, which led to the sale of over 2,000 digital copies prior to the album's official release. Dog Problems was released in stores on July 11, 2006. The day the album was released, an episode of MTV's My Super Sweet 16 featuring The Format aired, on which they performed at a birthday-graduation party for Priya and Divya Kothapalli from Nederland, Texas.

Following the release of Dog Problems, The Format gained more attention, receiving high marks from various publications, even topping some Best of 2006 lists. During this year, The Format toured near constantly, supporting their own album Dog Problems as well as supporting The All American Rejects in September in the UK.

In 2007, The Format played a show in Tokyo, Japan, were featured on Last Call with Carson Daly twice, co-headlined with Guster on their Campus Consciousness tour, and toured with Reubens Accomplice, Piebald, Limbeck, Steel Train, and The Honorary Title.

On June 25, 2007, celebrating the one-year anniversary of Dog Problems, The Format offered the album in its entirety, including the liner notes in PDF form, for free on their official website. The offer was valid from June 25 to July 16, 2007. As of July 10, 2007, 36,000 people had downloaded the album.

On February 4, 2008, The Format announced that they would be putting the band on hiatus, with Nate Ruess posting the following message on the band's website:

We have just put out word that we will not be making a new Format album. Please understand this was a tough decision and we're both upset about it. While we accept there will be false speculation as to why, understand that Sam and I remain extremely close and in fact are still passing the Twin Peaks box set back and forth in an attempt to figure out who REALLY killed Laura Palmer. We also want to thank everyone with and within the Format, particularly Mike, Don, and Marko, whom without, none of this would have ever even been fully realized. We both suggest you support their musical talents and whatever they decide to do. And lastly we want to thank the fans who made this the best 5 years of our lives.

Means went on to solo work, including scoring the soundtrack to the film The Sinking of Santa Isabel, as well as forming Destry with former Straylight Run singer Michelle DaRosa.

When asked about the band getting back together, Ruess acknowledged that "every one of us like to remain optimistic and hopeful that it one day could happen."

Following The Format's 2008 breakup, Ruess joined with Andrew Dost of Anathallo and Jack Antonoff of Steel Train to form fun., a band that went on to major commercial success. Their song "We Are Young" topped multiple global charts, including the Billboard Hot 100. The follow-up single, "Some Nights", also saw considerable commercial success. Fun began recording their debut album, Aim and Ignite, in September 2008 with producer Steven Shane McDonald and arranger Roger Joseph Manning Jr.; it was released on August 25, 2009. The band folded in 2015, with Antonoff focusing on Bleachers and Ruess releasing his debut solo album Grand Romantic before exiting music to focus on raising his family.

On February 3, 2020, the band formally re-released their 2007 concert film Live At The Mayamicn to streaming services and vinyl, having previously only been available on DVD. The band also reunited for a live screening of the film and, to the audience's surprise, performed together for the first time in over 12 years. The next day, the band announced a reunion in the spring of 2020 with concerts in Chicago, New York, and Phoenix.

In March 2020, their tour (originally scheduled for March and April 2020) was postponed to July 2020 due to the COVID-19 pandemic. In June 2020, it was postponed again to July 2021. After a third postponement to March and April 2022, the tour was ultimately cancelled. In July 2025, Means and Ruess announced that the band would be reuniting a second time, with four shows booked in the US across September and October 2025. In October 2025, the band announced their third studio album, Boycott Heaven. It was released on January 23, 2026 – almost 20 years after the release of Dog Problems.

== Band members ==
=== Principal members ===
- Sam Means – keyboards, piano, Mellotron, guitar, banjo, xylophone, saxophone, percussion, backing vocals
- Nate Ruess – lead vocals, percussion, occasional synthesizer, guitar

=== Current touring musicians ===
- Don Raymond, Jr. – bass guitar
- Mark Buzard – guitar, keyboards, auxiliary percussion, backing vocals
- Will Noon – drums

=== Collaborators and contributors ===
In alphabetical order by surname

- Deborah Avery – clarinet, saxophone
- Peggy Baldwin – cello
- Adam Boyd – drums, percussion, backing vocals
- Matt Chamberlain – drums
- Larry Colbert – cello
- Joel Derouin – violin
- Josh Freese – drums
- Matthew Funes – violin
- Scott Higgins – guiro, sleigh bells
- J'Anna Jacoby – cello
- Rami Jaffee – accordion
- Randy Jones – tuba
- Josh Klinghoffer – guitar
- Johana Krejci – violin
- Paul Loredo – French horn
- Roger Manning, Jr. – keyboards, harpsichord
- Jean Marianelli – French horn
- Rory Mazella – clarinet, saxophone
- Sean McCall – drums, percussion
- Steven McDonald – bass guitar, backing vocals, production
- Mike McGuffey – trumpet
- Jim McMillan – trombone
- Joe Meyer – French horn
- Geoffrey Moore – electric guitar
- Paul Nelson - drums, audio engineer
- Brendan O'Brien – bass guitar, production
- John O'Reilly, Jr. – drums, percussion
- Charlie Paxson – drums
- Michele Richards – violin
- Kethleen Robertson – violin
- Dave Ryan – trombone
- Mike Schey – guitar
- Richard Todd – French horn
- R. Walt Vincent – bass guitar, drums, piano, percussion, keyboards, harmonium, melodica, backing vocals, production
- Anna Waronker – backing vocals
- Joey Waronker – drums
- Roy Wiegand – trumpet
- Adriana Zoppo – viola

== Discography ==
=== Studio albums ===
- Interventions + Lullabies (2003)
- Dog Problems (2006)
- Boycott Heaven (2026)

=== Compilations ===
- Live at the Mesa Amphitheater (Limited Release live album, 2004)
- B-Sides & Rarities (The Vanity Label, 2007)
- Live at the Mayan Theatre (The Vanity Label, recorded 2007, released 2020)

=== EPs ===
- EP (self-released, 2002)
- Snails (Atlantic, 2005)
- Live from the Living Room: Volume One (The Vanity Label, 2006)
- And Now I Hope You're Alright - Live in California (The Vanity Label, 2006)
- The Format Live: Exporting Insecurity (The Vanity Label, 2006)
- Kenneth Room Sessions (The Vanity Label, 2016)

=== DVD ===
- Live at the Mayan Theatre (The Vanity Label, 2007)

=== Singles ===
Title	Year	Peak chart positions		Album
Title	Year	US Alt.	US Rock Air	Album
"The First Single"	2003	—	—	Interventions and Lullabies
"The Compromise"	2006	—	—	Dog Problems
"Time Bomb"	2006	—	—	Dog Problems
"Apeman"	2006	—	—	Non-album singles
"She Doesn't Get It"	2006	—	—	Dog Problems
"Dog Problems"	2006	—	—	Dog Problems
"Swans"	2016	—	—	Non-album single
"Your New Name"	2022	—	—	Non-album single
"Holy Roller"	2025	17	25	Boycott Heaven
"Shot In the Dark"	2025	—	—	Boycott Heaven
"Boycott Heaven"	2025	—	—	Boycott Heaven
"Right Where I Belong"	2026	—	—	Boycott Heaven
"The Bar is Set So Low"	2026	—	—	Non-album single

=== Other songs ===
- "Swans" was written especially for the film Moving McAllister.
- Listen To Bob Dylan: A Tribute (Drive-Thru, 2005) - "Simple Twist of Fate"
- Acoustic Live & Rare 2006 & Last Character Standing, Vol. V (The Edge 103.9 fm) - "The Compromise (Acoustic)"
- A Santa Cause: It's a Punk Rock Christmas (Immortal Records, Vol 2: December 5, 2006) - "Holly Jolly Christmas"
