= Grand Romantic =

Studio album by Nate Ruess
- Released: June 16, 2015
- Genres: Pop; stadium rock
- Length: 46:17
- Label: Fueled by Ramen
- Producer: Jeff Bhasker

Singles from Grand Romantic
- 1. "Nothing Without Love" Released: February 23, 2015; 2. "AhHa" Released: April 26, 2015; 3. "Great Big Storm" Released: May 11, 2015; 4. "What This World Is Coming To" Released: June 1, 2015; 5. "Take It Back" Released: January 12, 2016

Grand Romantic is the debut solo studio album of Nate Ruess, lead vocalist from The Format and Fun. It was released on June 16, 2015, by Fueled by Ramen. The album was produced by Some Nights producer Jeff Bhasker. Following the hiatus of Fun, Ruess announced that he would be working on material for a solo project.

The album received a generally positive reception, however critics noted that it was overly theatrical in terms of production, lyricism and vocal delivery. Grand Romantic debuted at number 7 on the Billboard 200 and spawned four singles: "Nothing Without Love", "AhHa", "Great Big Storm" and "What This World Is Coming To".

== Promotion ==
On June 10, the album was made available for streaming on the MTV website. Later the same day, the "AhHa" visualizer video was released.

== Critical reception ==
Professional ratings
Aggregate scores
Source	Rating
Metacritic	61/100
Review scores
Source	Rating
AbsolutePunk	60%
AllMusic	3.5/5 stars
Alternative Press	4/5 stars
The A.V. Club	C
New York Daily News	0/5 stars
Pitchfork	5.5/10
PopMatters	6/10 stars
Punknews.org	3.5/5 stars
Rolling Stone	3.5/5 stars
Spin	4/10

Grand Romantic received positive reviews but music critics were divided over Ruess' musical vision in terms of production, lyrics and performance. At Metacritic, which assigns a normalized rating out of 100 to reviews from mainstream critics, the album received an average score of 61, based on 10 reviews.

Awarding the album four of five stars, Jack Appleby of Alternative Press wrote that "Grand Romantic is proof-positive more Nate Ruess is always a good thing." Jon Dolan of Rolling Stone was positive towards the album's theatrical production and upbeat optimism, saying that, "Fun. co-producers Jeff Bhasker and Emile Haynie help Ruess create richly orchestrated bombast with the right amount of sonic wanderlust." Matt Collar of AllMusic praised the collaboration of Ruess, Bhasker and Haynie for creating a project that embraces the concept of love, calling it "a fittingly grandiose, occasionally silly, passionately effusive, and ultimately very catchy album."

Annie Zaleski of The A.V. Club saw potential in the album's themes but said that it was brought down by subdued production and lyrical content with neither depth or conflict in its romantic tales, concluding that "Grand Romantic often feels so preoccupied with grandiose gestures that it loses sight of the little details that in the past have made Ruess’ music so memorable." Alfred Soto of Spin criticized Ruess for his inability to tone down his singing style or deliver songs that stood out on the album. Jim Farber of the New York Daily News compared the album negatively to Adam Lambert's The Original High saying that while both are musically similar, Lambert's voice performs campy theatrics better than Ruess' unsubtle delivery, saying that "[T]here's no roundness, or richness, to his tone. It's all hard angles, offering no cushion for the screech."

== Film ==
Alongside the release of this album, The Grand Romantic, a 28-minute short film starring Nate Ruess was also released. It features a number of songs from this album.

== Track listing ==
Standard edition
No.	Title	Writer(s)	Length
1.	"Grand Romantic (intro)"		0:43
2.	"AhHa"	Jeff Bhasker; Emile Haynie; Josh Klinghoffer; Nate Ruess	4:24
3.	"Nothing Without Love"	Bhasker; Haynie; Klinghoffer; Ruess	3:56
4.	"Take It Back"	Bhasker; Haynie; Ruess	4:24
5.	"You Light My Fire"	Bhasker; Haynie; Ruess	3:12
6.	"What This World Is Coming To" (featuring Beck)	Bhasker; Beck Hansen; Haynie; Ruess	4:03
7.	"Great Big Storm"	Bhasker; Haynie; Ruess	4:01
8.	"Moment"	Bhasker; Haynie; Ruess	4:13
9.	"It Only Gets Much Worse"	Bhasker; Sloane Crosley; Andrew Dost; Ruess	4:18
10.	"Grand Romantic"	Roger Manning	3:36
11.	"Harsh Light"	Jack Antonoff; Bhasker; Dost; Nathan Edward Harold; Ruess	4:51
12.	"Brightside"	Bhasker; Haynie; Manning; Ruess	4:35
Total length:			46:17

== Personnel ==
Adapted from the Grand Romantic liner notes.

- John Janick – executive producer
- Sam Means – art direction
- Teresa Oaxaca – painting, sketching and photography
- Emily Moore – backing vocals

== Charts ==
Chart performance for Grand Romantic
Chart (2015)	Peak position
Australian Albums (ARIA)	61
Italian Albums (FIMI)	94
Swiss Albums (Schweizer Hitparade)	56
US Billboard 200	7
