= Dog Problems =

Studio album by the Format
- Released: July 11, 2006
- Genres: Indie pop; indie rock; power pop
- Length: 47:16
- Label: The Vanity Label
- Producer: Steven McDonald

The Format chronology
Snails (2005)	Dog Problems (2006)	And Now I Hope You're Alright – Live in California (2006)

Singles from Dog Problems
- 1. "The Compromise" Released: July 18, 2006; 2. "Time Bomb" Released: October 17, 2006; 3. "She Doesn't Get It" Released: March 6, 2007

Dog Problems is the second studio album by American rock band The Format; the album was released on July 11, 2006, through the band's label The Vanity Label. Following the release of their debut studio album Interventions + Lullabies (2003), The Format were moved from Elektra Records to Atlantic Records, who were unable to promote them, causing the band to leave the label in late 2005. The Format recorded their next album Dog Problems with producer Steven McDonald in Los Angeles, California. Dog Problems is an indie pop, indie rock and power pop album that has been compared to the work of the Cars, Ben Folds and Jimmy Eat World.

Dog Problems received generally favorable reviews from critics, many of whom praised the band's musicianship and songwriting. Retrospective reviews concurred, noting comparisons to the work of Fun. The album peaked at number 84 on the United States Billboard 200 chart, selling 13,000 in its first week. In July 2006, "The Compromise" was released as the album's lead single, around which, the band went on a headlining US tour. Shows in the United Kingdom and the US with the All-American Rejects followed, and "Time Bomb" was released as the second single from the album in October 2006. "She Doesn't Get It" was released in March 2007 as the final single, which was later promoted with a three-month US tour.

== Background and recording ==
The Format released their debut studio album Interventions + Lullabies through Elektra Records in October 2003. In March 2004, Elektra was absorbed into Warner Bros. Records, after which the band were moved to Atlantic Records. While this was occurring, the band were supporting Yellowcard and Something Corporate on their co-headlining tour of the United States. Over the next three months, The Format performed on the Honda Civic Tour, and went on headlining tours of the West Coast and Midwest. They ended 2004 touring the US with Switchfoot and the Honorary Title. Atlantic Records had no success in promoting The Format, resulting in legal situations.

In April 2005, The Format supported Jimmy Eat World and Taking Back Sunday on their co-headlining US tour; to coincide with this, The Format released an Extended Play (EP) titled Snails. By July 2005, The Format were recording demos, after which they aimed to find a producer. According to Ruess, their record company listened to the band's new demos but "didn't hear a single"; the band repeatedly asked the label to remove them from the roster. Ruess planned to make a concept album about the ending of his five-year-long relationship but this idea was abandoned because he was "still in the relationship and it was still going bad and I couldn't get out of it". Atlantic removed the band while they were preparing to record their next album. On November 30, 2005, The Format publicly announced their departure from the label.

Dog Problems was produced by Steven McDonald, who was assisted by engineer Ken Sluiter, and was recorded in Los Angeles, California, over two months. They worked 12 hours per day on six days a week. Throughout the recording process, Ruess frequently apologized to his partner; he would make a "conscious effort to call her and say, 'I don't want you to take offense to this. It's just where I was at the time. I forgive you as much as I can.'" Sluiter mixed "I'm Actual", "Time Bomb" and "Pick Me Up", and the remaining tracks were mixed by Tom Rothrock. Mike Tarantino served as mixing engineer and Don Taylor mastered the album at Precision Mastering. "Snails" was re-recorded during the sessions; Ruess said the original EP version was recorded on a strict time-frame and the band were unable to give the song enough attention. They had wanted to include a children's choir but this was omitted when they ran out of time while recording the new version for the album.

== Composition and lyrics ==
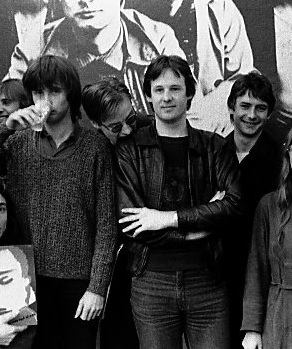
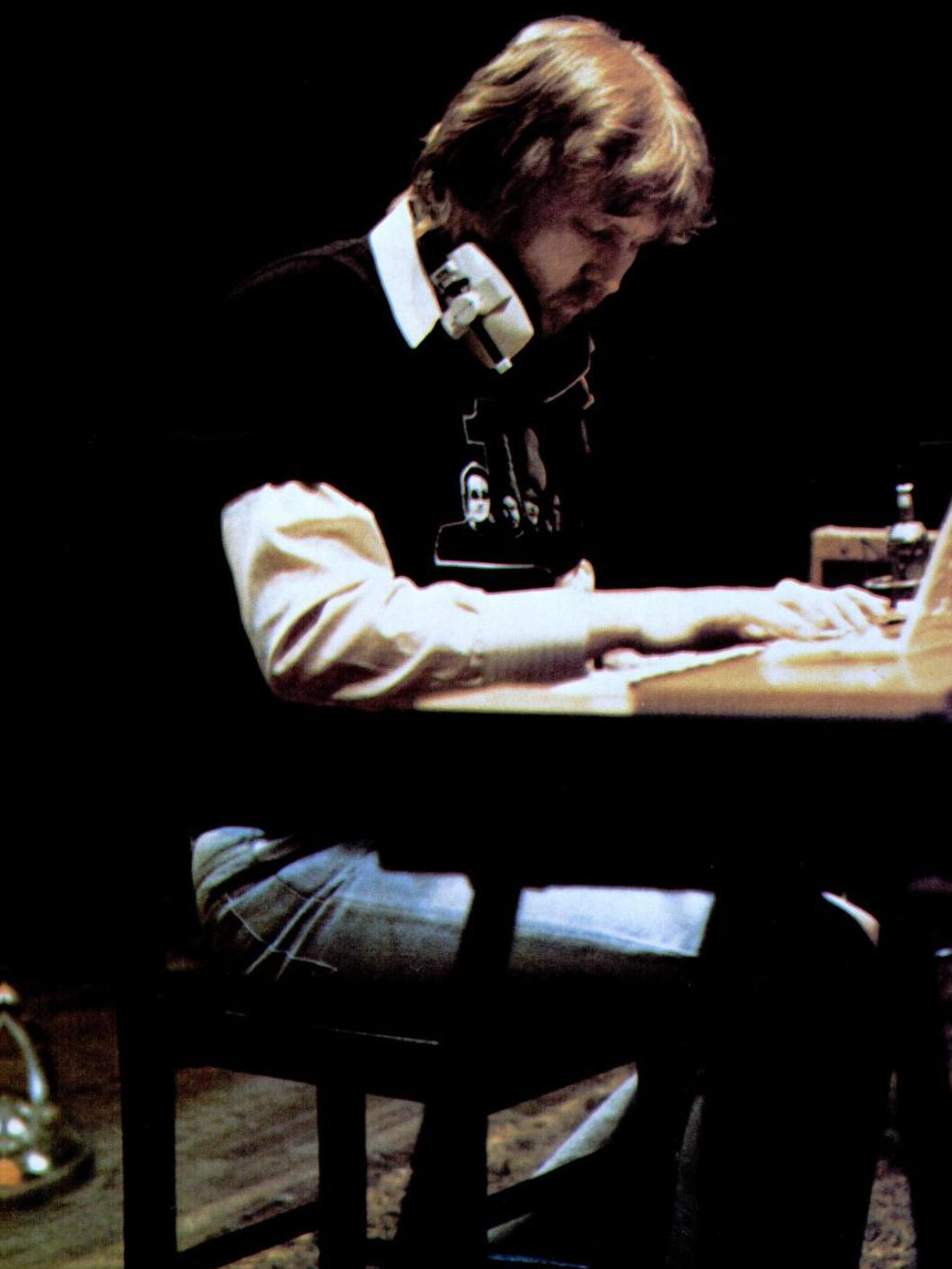
Works by XTC (left) and Harry Nilsson (right) have been cited as major influences on Dog Problems.

=== Music and themes ===
The music of Dog Problems has been described as indie pop, indie rock and power pop, drawing comparisons to the work of The Cars, Cake, Eels, Ben Folds, Jimmy Eat World and Talking Heads. Ruess cited Skylarking (1986) by XTC as his biggest influence for the album; he said; "That record made me feel like it was okay to make a pop record that was a little weird at times, but something sunny was tying it all together". For Means, inspiration came from Nilsson Sings Newman (1970) by Harry Nilsson, which Ruess said has "so many great standardish songs". The works of The Beatles and The Zombies were also cited as influences; the pair would listen to "You're the Inspiration" (1984) by Chicago while traveling to the studio every day. In a 2012 interview, Ruess said there was a "level of insecurity that I had. I would try and apologize for writing a pop song by giving it a bridge that was four minutes long or changing keys 90 different times".

AllMusic reviewer Corey Apar wrote there is a "whimsical, carnival-esque air that appears sporadically throughout" Dog Problems as the band "mix in horn sections, piano, banjo, handclaps and pretty much whatever else was lying around the studio". IGN writer Chad Grischow said The Format bounce between a "soulful and reflective pair, begging comparisons to old Beach Boys, while at other times they dazzle with danceable beats and dangerously addictive soaring emo hooks", evoking Jimmy Eat World. PopMatters contributor Winston Kung said across the album's songs, Ruess "discusses corporate rock magazines, moving to the [country] Ukraine, and one dysfunctional girlfriend in particular who seems to have eviscerated his heart". The melody of some songs, such as "I'm Actual" and "Dog Problems", came about when Ruess was sitting at home or driving; he would repeat the melodies to Means, who would then work out the chord progressions. From here, Ruess took lyrics from a notebook and worked them around the melodies.

Means and Ruess were supplemented by additional musicians for every song on Dog Problems, which includes cello, violin, viola, French horn, clarinet, sax, trumpet, trombone and tuba instrumentation. Mike Schey of The Honorary Title played guitar on over half of the album, while Josh Klinghoffer of the Red Hot Chili Peppers played on three of the songs. Don Raymond Jr. contributed bass to over half of the album while McDonald played bass on three of the songs. John O'Riley of Blue Öyster Cult played drums and percussion on most of the album, and Joey Waronker played on "Dead End", "Inches and Falling" and "Matches". Roger Manning Jr. wrote orchestral arrangements for three of the songs, and played a Wurlitzer on "Time Bomb" and a harpsichord on "Snails". Anna Waronker arranged and sang vocals on "I'm Actual", "Time Bomb" and "Dead End". Aaron Wendt of Tickertape Parade added Doppler effect to "Pick Me Up" and noise to "Oceans". A collective known as The Hobocamp Choir sang gang vocals on "Dog Problems", "Oceans" and "Inches and Falling", and performed clapping on "Oceans".

=== Tracks ===
Discussing the album's title and the song "Dog Problems", Ruess said he was in a relationship where "every single time we thought that maybe we were going to break up, we'd try to save the relationship by getting a dog". The album's opening song "Matches" is a slow-tempo track with a carnival-esque sound, a loose arrangement of chimes and a keyboard. It segues into "I'm Actual", which is an orchestral waltz; Merry-Go-Round Magazine writer Aya Lehman said Ruess asks for an "hour of reeling in the remains of a breakup, how the effects of said breakup come in waves, [and] the neverending desperation to talk about said breakup". "Time Bomb" is a dance-rock and power-pop track that blends drums and a piano against a disco beat; it describes a self-destructive woman who self-harms by the song's end. The track evolved from an occasion in which Means and Ruess tried to recall an older, unrelated song. Ruess wrote the melody and lyrics, and on the same day they recorded a demo of it. The surf rock song "She Doesn't Get It" discusses casual sex and includes a reference to Duran Duran. The fifth track, "Pick Me Up", begins with lyrics taken from the chorus of "Green Isaac (I)" on Prefab Sprout's first album Swoon.

"Dog Problems" opens with a Dixieland jazz atmosphere, and describes having a broken heart; the song is accompanied by bar piano and horns. Kung said the track serves as both a "circus song and a cutting portrait of a bitch, with a run-through of the alphabet to boot". Sputnikmusic staff writer Knott said Ruess spells out "B-E-C-C-A before he realizes that he's spelling 'because' wrong and his thoughts have slipped back onto his presumed ex-girlfriend". The pop rock track "Oceans" recalls the work of the Beach Boys; Merry-Go-Round Magazine founder CJ Simpson wrote "Dead End" feels like a "massive post-intermission number of a happy-go-lucky musical". "Snails" is a folk song that uses the titular creatures as a metaphor for loving one's life; the track's guitar-playing is reminiscent of the style played by Paul McCartney in "Blackbird" (1968) by The Beatles. "The Compromise" is a response to Atlantic Records' request to the band for a hit-sounding song. Ruess said it "wasn't written because we were dropped, but in an attempt to get dropped from our label ... we gave them something catchy—only it was about (our experiences with) them". "Inches and Falling" is a twee pop track that Grischow said is an "emphatic plea for love, despite the potential for emotional destruction". The album's closing song "If Work Permits" recalls the work of The Strokes and switches from a being ballad to a glam rock song.

== Release ==
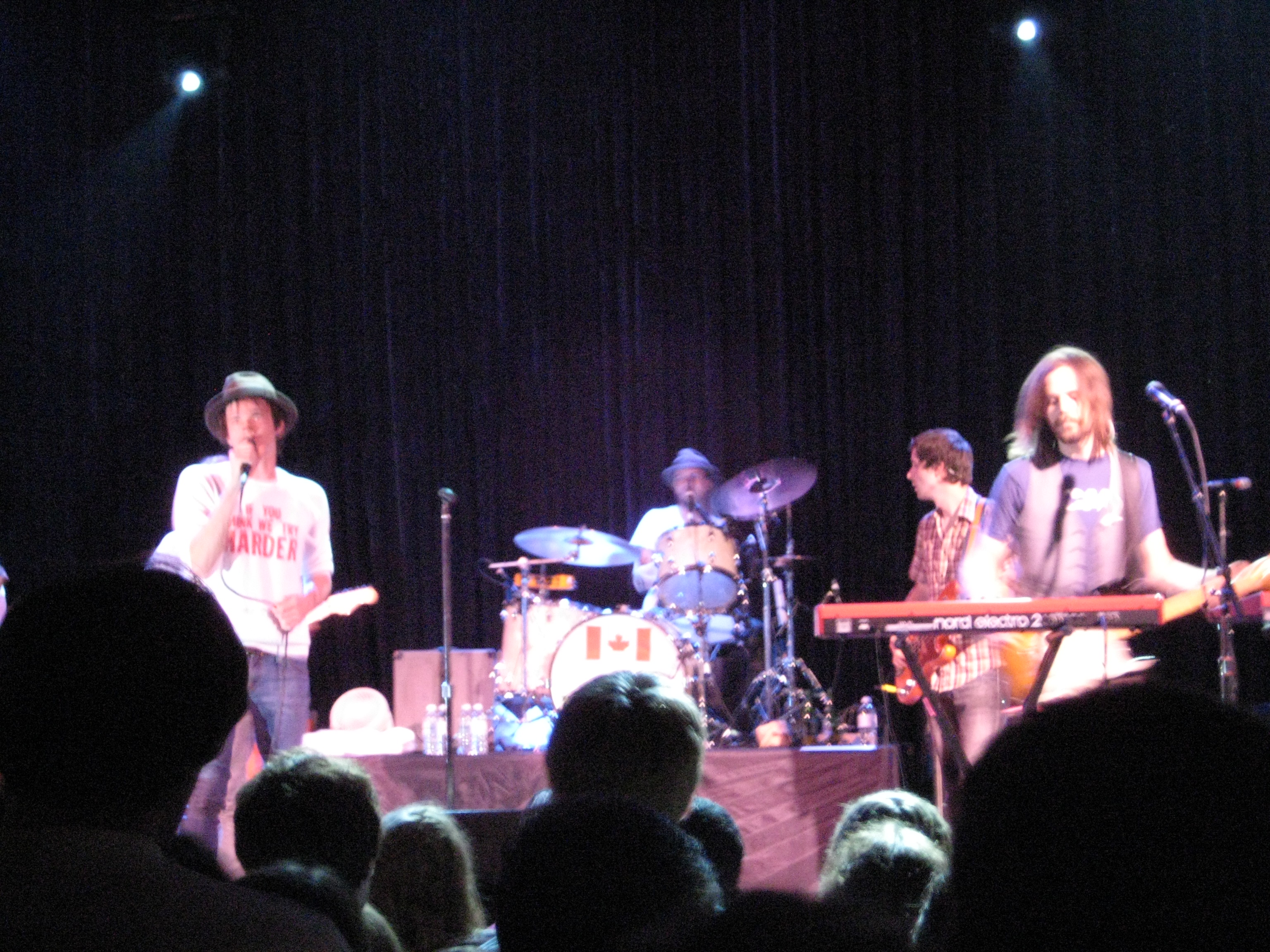
The Format toured throughout 2006 and 2007 for Dog Problems.

The Format supported Motion City Soundtrack in March and April 2006. A few weeks before its release, Dog Problems was leaked online, prompting the band them to sell it digitally early through The Nettwork's online store. Ruess wrote a long-form piece about the band's experiences while making the album and why listeners should not pirate it. When it was leaked, Ruess did not have the finished masters so he purchased the download version to show his parents. Dog Problems was made available for streaming through AOL Music on July 10, 2006, and was released the following day on The Vanity Label, The Format's own record label, with distribution through Sony BMG. On July 14, 2006, the band performed the entire album at a release show at Celebrity Theatre in Phoenix, Arizona.

"The Compromise" was released to radio on July 18, 2006; the same month, a music video for the song was filmed over four hours and features origami. In July and August, the band went on a summer tour with support from Rainer Maria and Anathallo. The Format's touring line-up was augmented by Wendt and members of Anathallo. The band took a week-long break in September before touring the UK with the All-American Rejects for two weeks. "Time Bomb" was released to radio on October 17, 2006; the seven-inch (18 cm) vinyl version includes a cover of "Glutton of Sympathy" (1993) by Jellyfish as its B-side. A week later, the live EP And Now I Hope You're Alright – Live in California, including versions of "Matches", "Dog Problems", and "Inches and Falling", was released. From late October to mid December 2006, the band supported The All-American Rejects on their Tournado 2006 tour, which included an appearance at the CMJ Festival.

On November 20, 2006, a music video for "Dog Problems" was released. The staff at Spin wrote it features hands, saying the "forefinger protagonist ... [is seen] doing the things a normal human would do: Singing to his cheating lover, wandering neon-lit streets somberly, perusing MySpace, smoking himself to sleep, and, um, fantasizing over a mannequin's perfect hand". "She Doesn't Get It" was released to radio on March 6, 2007; its music video was directed by Travis Kopach. On June 14, The Format performed Dog Problems in its entirety at Mayan Theatre in Los Angeles; the performance was filmed for a potential DVD release. In June 2007, the album was released as a free download over a three-week period. Ruess said the band knew "kids aren't buying music", and added; "We're going to see if we can't pick up 20,000 new sets of ears by offering the album for free". Following this, the band went on a three-month headlining US tour with support on various dates from Mike Birbiglia, Limbeck, Steel Train, Reuben's Accomplice, The Honorary Title, Ollie Wilde and Piebald. The band released the video album Live at the Mayan Theatre, which consists of songs from their two studio albums, on November 13, 2007. In February 2008, The Format announced they were breaking up.

Dog Problems was initially released as an LP in 2006; in 2014, it was reissued as a two-disc edition with a die-cut jacket and an etching of a dog bowl on the D-side. The two-disc version was re-pressed in 2016 and 2020. In 2022, the album was released on cassette as a joint release by The Vanity Label and Means' label Hello Records. Demos of "I'm Actual", "Time Bomb", "Dead End" and "If Work Permits", and an acoustic version of "Matches" were included on The Format's compilation album B-Sides and Rarities (2007). These versions of "Time Bomb" and "If Work Permits" were later included on the EP Kenneth Room Sessions, which also includes demos of "She's Doesn't Get It", "Pick Me Up", "Oceans", "The Compromise" and "Inches and Falling". The Dog Problems portion of the Live at the Mayan Theatre video album was released alone as a live album in 2020, under the title Live at the Mayan Theatre: Dog Problems.

== Reception ==
Professional ratings
Review scores
Source	Rating
AbsolutePunk	95%
AllMusic	4.5/5 stars
Alternative Press	4/5
The A.V. Club	B+
Chicago Tribune	3/5
IGN	8.9/10
Melodic	3.5/5 stars
No Ripchord	7/10
PopMatters	7/10
Spin	4/5 stars

Dog Problems was met with generally favorable reviews from music critics. AbsolutePunk founder Jason Tate wrote the first five tracks "impact with their hooks and choruses, it's the next 7 that make the album an almost instant classic". Apar referred to it as "hands-down the feel-good album of the summer. After all, the heartache-induced lyrics of sarcasm and bitterness are in direct contrast to the sonic warmth emanating from. every note-filled corner". He added despite heavy use of extra instruments, "every element is cleanly pulled off with such effortless charm, grace, and style that the songs in no way feel bogged down under the weight of the bands' ambition". Grischow said The Format made a "refreshing album that screams for repeated play on sticky summer days", and added it "works both as a danceable party rock album and as an example of beautiful songwriting ability". Punktastic founder Paul Savage said among the "drama and intrigue is a record that's nigh on perfect". According to Billboard's Katie Hasty, the "breathless indie pop and broken-hearted lyrics of Dog Problems deserve every bit of the attention they are receiving".

Jennifer Sica of Alternative Press called Dog Problems an "odyssey sans trite lyrical clichés and guitar-overload breakdowns" found in emo while Spin's Peter Gaston praised the "immaculate conceived arrangements", which "come to vivid life" with Ruess' "acerbic, spot-on witticisms". Riverfront Times writer Julie Seabaugh said "instead of treading clichéd ground, Ruess employs metaphors far more convincing than his peers' overused" imagery. She asked "Females? Financial backing? If [Dog Problems] is any indication, freedom suits The Format better than those two things combined". According to Trent Moore of Soundthesirens, the album is one of the best releases to "ever be recorded. It's a collection of driving, happy sing-alongs that you can't help but fall in love with on the first listen". Mxdwn's Jacquie Frisco wrote the band made "something very unlikely: a tight, independent sophomore release that's more mature and meaningful than their first". Melodic's Pär Winberg called Dog Problems "whimsical, it's joyful, it's glad, it's sad, it's all a mess in the instrumentation and it's just adorable all over".

According to Kung, the breadth of instruments used make Dog Problems sound like "Disney—on crack, and what's really surprising is that it doesn't crumble under all that feel-good weight". Apart from the "occasional tedium", Kung said the majority of the album shows "effortlessly creative depth". Alan Shulman of No Ripcord wrote The Format "do a pretty good job putting their own spin on the melodic-here comes the hook-there goes the riff-check out this harmony pop song". He said the album "never really dips below the level of 'pretty decent' which is enough to recommend it, but it's a sad fact that familiarity breeds contempt". The A.V. Club writer Noel Murray said Dog Problems "relies a little too much on pat power-pop formulas, though Ruess' sweetly elastic voice and honest anger carry a lot of the songs close to 'Time Bomb' sublimity". According ti Chicago Tribune contributor Kevin Bronson, the melodies "stick but never wear out their welcome" because the tracks are "arranged [well] but don't suffocate from their orchestration". Mxdwn included "Dog Problems" on their list of the 40 best songs from 2006 while "The Compromise" was included on No Ripchord's similar list.

=== Commercial performance ===
Dog Problems sold 13,000 copies in its first week of physical release, peaking at number 84 on the Billboard 200; it had sold 2,000 copies prior to the physical edition's release. Alongside this, the album peaked at number 11 on the Tastemarkers chart.

=== Retrospective reviews ===
In a retrospective review, Knott said Dog Problems "sweeps you through 45 minutes of brilliantly easy listening with every ounce of its musical integrity intact", and called it perfect. Knott concluded their review with; "Broad, honest and ambitious, Dog Problems is a stunning listen from start to finish". According to Tyler Scruggs of Spokesman, the album has a "timeless aspect that unfortunately isn't afforded to many of Nate Ruess' more recent efforts". Spectrum Culture writer John Paul added to this, stating the album "should have made their career or, at the very least, helped assure them some sort of iconic cult record status". In comparison, he said the material on Fun's Some Nights (2012) appears "overproduced, lesser versions of the ideas conveyed on Dog Problems".

Dan Bogosian in his book Red Hot Chili Peppers FAQ (2020) wrote Klinghoffer's parts on the album are "not the most advanced guitar work, [but] one of the songs became one of the Format's largest hits in 'I'm Actual'", which he said foreshadowed the sound Fun would later explore. The Young Folks writer Ryan Gibbs expanded on this, saying fans are able to hear "early inklings" of Fun's album Some Nights in the songs "I'm Actual" and "Dog Problems". In addition to this, he called Fun's debut studio album Aim and Ignite (2009) the "spiritual successor to Dog Problems", and said Dog Problems is "one of the best power pop records of the 2000s and a towering statement of 21st century love and heartbreak".

== Track listing ==
All tracks are written by Sam Means and Nate Ruess, except where noted.

Standard edition
No.	Title	Writer(s)	Length
1.	"Matches"		2:10
2.	"I'm Actual"		3:47
3.	"Time Bomb"		4:01
4.	"She Doesn't Get It"		3:51
5.	"Pick Me Up"		3:46
6.	"Dog Problems"		4:11
7.	"Oceans"		4:48
8.	"Dead End"	Means, Linda Perry, Ruess	4:08
9.	"Snails"		4:09
10.	"The Compromise"		3:27
11.	"Inches and Falling (I Love, Love)"		3:30
12.	"If Work Permits"		5:28
Total length:			47:18

Bonus track
No.	Title	Writer(s)	Length
13.	"The Lottery Song"	Harry Nilsson	2:24
Total length:			49:42

== Personnel ==
Personnel per booklet.

The Format

- Nate Ruess – vocals, "a grain of synth", horn arrangements (track 8 and 11)
- Sam Means – piano, keyboards, guitars, "other fun instruments we had laying around", horn arrangements (track 8 and 11)

Additional musicians

- J'Anna Jacoby – cello
- Peggy Baldwin – cello
- Kethleen Robertson – violin
- Johana Krejci – violin
- Adriana Zoppo – viola
- Jean Marianelli – French horn
- Paul Loredo – French horn
- Deborah Avery – clarinet, sax
- Rory Mazella – clarinet, sax
- Mike McGuffey – trumpet
- Roy Wiegand – trumpet
- Jim McMillan – trombone
- Dave Ryan – trombone
- Randy Jones – tuba

Additional musicians (cont'd)

- Mike Schey – guitar (tracks 4, 5, 7 and 9–12), slide guitar (track 5)
- Don Raymond Jr. – bass guitar (tracks 2, 4, 5, 7 and 9–12)
- John O'Reilly Jr. – drums (tracks 2–7, 9, 10 and 12), percussion (tracks 2–8)
- Roger Manning Jr. – orchestral arrangement (tracks 2, 6 and 9), Wurlitzer (track 3), harpsichord (track 9)
- Joey Waronker – drums (tracks 8 and 11), percussion (track 1)
- Steven McDonald – bass guitar (tracks 3, 6 and 8), backup vocals (tracks 7 and 10)
- Anna Waronker – vocals (tracks 2, 3 and 8), vocal arrangements (tracks 2, 3 and 8)
- Josh Klinghoffer – guitar (tracks 2, 3 and 8)
- Sean McCall – percussion (tracks 9–11)
- Aaron Wendt – doppler (track 5), noise (track 7)
- The Hobocamp Choir – gang vocals (tracks 6, 7 and 11), claps (track 7)
  - Steven McDonald
  - Sam Means
  - Ken Sluiter
  - Nate Ruess
  - Mark Buzard
  - Mike Schey
  - Sean McCall

Production and design

- Steven McDonald – producer
- Ken Sluiter – engineer, mixing (tracks 2, 3 and 5)
- Tom Rothrock – mixing (tracks 1, 4 and 6–12)
- Mike Tarantino – mix engineer
- Don Taylor – mastering
- John Rummen – art direction
- Sam Means – art

== Charts ==
Chart performance for Dog Problems
Chart (2006)	Peak position
US Billboard 200	84
US Tastemakers Albums (Billboard)	11
