= Destry (band) =

American indie folk band

- Origin: Boston, Massachusetts, United States
- Genres: Indie folk; indie rock
- Years active: 2008–present
- Label: Paper + Plastick
- Members: Michelle DaRosa; Shaun Cooper; Sam Means; Nico Childrey; Tyler Odom
- Website: Myspace

Destry is an indie folk band centered on Michelle DaRosa.

== History ==
Michelle DaRosa announced her departure from Straylight in June 2008 in order to work on a solo album. The Destry project was made public in October 2008, when Sam Means of the Format posted that he had been recording music for them for a few months. Destry's current work currently consists of collaborations between Michelle and four other artists, Means, drummer Nico Childrey and Tyler Odom who played together in Cassino, and bassist Shaun Cooper of Straylight Run and Taking Back Sunday.

DaRosa said all five have collaborated, but have never been in the same room together. The band was proven to have finally been all together by a MySpace blog post by her on February 2, 2009. She also says the only members of a possible tour would be herself, Nico, and Shaun. In June 2009, the band went on a tour of the US with the Narrative. Destry's first studio album, It Goes On, was released on October 30, 2009.

== Discography ==
- It Goes On (2009)
- Waiting on an Island (2011)
