= Lucy Knisley =

American comic artist and musician

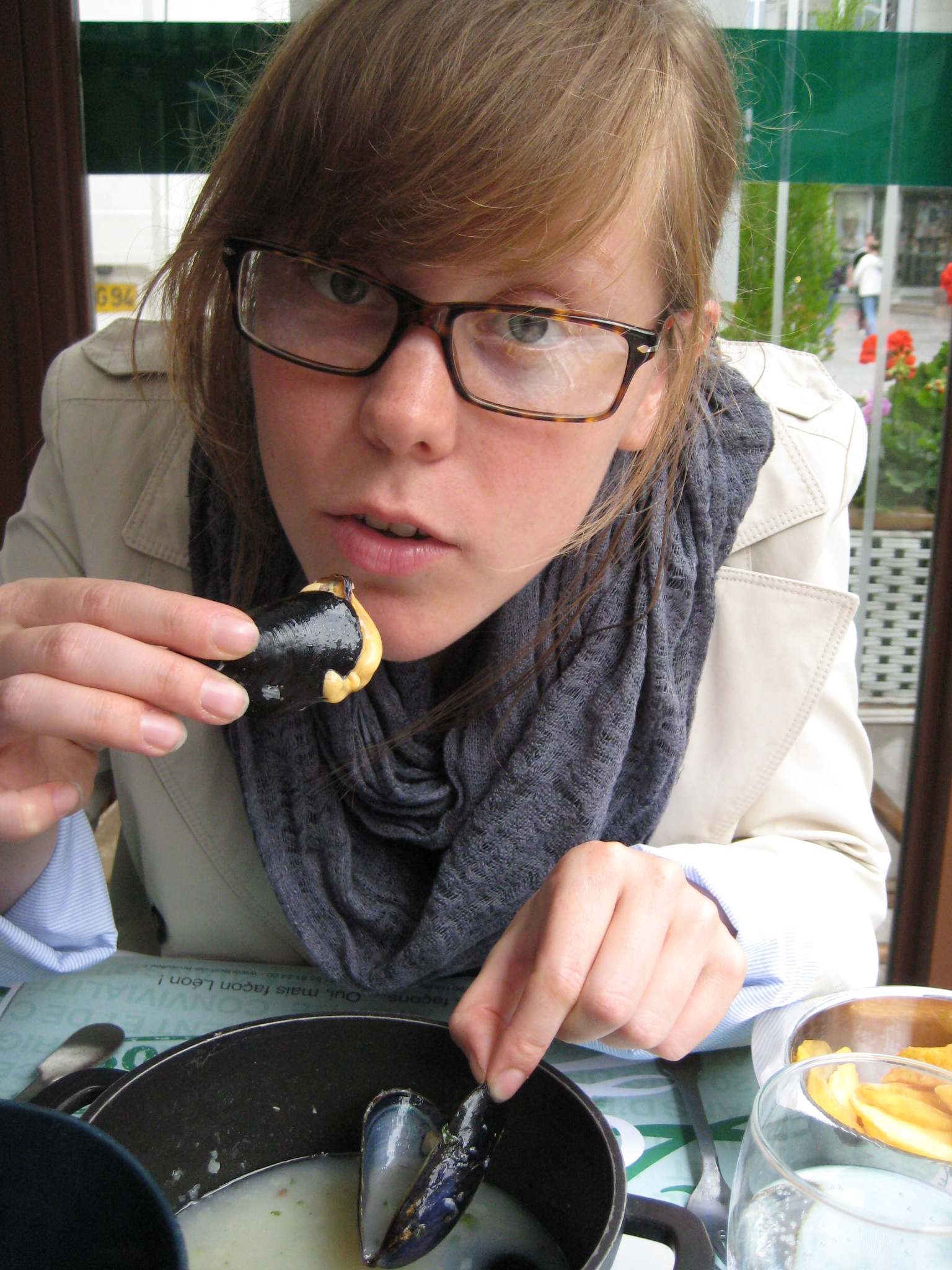
- Knisley eating mussels in Paris in 2009
- Born: Lucy Louise Knisley; January 11, 1985 (age 41) New York City, New York, U.S.
- Areas: Writer, Artist
- Notable works: French Milk, Relish, Kid Gloves

Lucy Knisley (born January 11, 1985) is an American comic artist and musician. Her work is often autobiographical, and food is a common theme.

Knisley's drawn travel journal French Milk was published through Simon & Schuster in October 2008. It received positive reviews in several publications, such as USA Today and Salon.com. Comics critic Douglas Wolk described it as "a keenly observed letter back home... the pleasure Knisley takes in food and company is infectious."

Knisley holds a BFA ('07) from The School of the Art Institute of Chicago. While there, she contributed to and edited the comics section of the school newspaper, FNews. Knisley holds an MFA ('09) from the Center for Cartoon Studies. She was awarded the 2007 Diamond in the Rough scholarship for her CCS application comic, Heart Seed Snow Circuit. She is a 2014 recipient of the Alex Awards.

== Personal life ==
Knisley married designer John Horstman in September 2014. At the time of his proposal to her, they had been separated for three years after a five-year relationship.

Knisley gave birth to her first child on June 13, 2016. She refers to them as "Pal" in her writing, short for Palindrome, for privacy reasons.

== Works ==
=== Biographical series ===
- French Milk (2008, Simon & Schuster, ISBN 1-4165-7534-0)
- Relish: My Life in the Kitchen (2013, First Second, ISBN 9781596436237)
- An Age of License: A Travelogue (2014, Fantagraphics, ISBN 9781606997680)
- Displacement: A Travelogue (2015, Fantagraphics, ISBN 9781606998106)
- Something New: Tales from a Makeshift Bride (2016, First Second, ISBN 9781626722491)
- Kid Gloves: Nine Months of Careful Chaos (2019, First Second, ISBN 9781626728080)
- Go to Sleep (I Miss You): Cartoons from the Fog of New Parenthood (2020, First Second, ISBN 9781250211491)
- Woe: A Housecat's Story of Despair (2024, Random House Graphic, ISBN 9780593177631)

=== Picture books ===
- You Are New (2019, Chronicle Books, ISBN 9781452161563)
- Ride Beside Me (2024, Knopf Books for Young Readers, ISBN 9781984897190)
- Searching for Wocks (2026, Rocky Pond Books, ISBN 9780593858257)

=== Peapod Farm (series) ===
- Stepping Stones (2020, Random House Graphic, ISBN 9780593125243)
- Apple Crush (2022, Random House Graphic, ISBN 9780593125380)
- Sugar Shack (2025, Random House Graphic, ISBN 9781984896926)

=== Anthology contributor ===
- Trubble Club Vol. 1-4 (2008–09)
- You Ain't No Dancer #3 (2008, New Reliable Press, ISBN 978-0-9738079-3-6)
- Secrets & Lies (2008, Magic Inkwell Press)
- Elephano the Magician (2008, ISBN 0-557-01798-X)
- Side B: The Music Lover's Graphic Novel (2009, Poseur Ink, ISBN 978-0-615-22080-2)
- I Saw You... (2009, Random House, ISBN 0-307-40853-1)
- Marvel Comics:
  - Girl Comics Vol.2 #1 (May 2010) "Shop Doc"
  - I Am An Avenger Vol.1 #4 (February 2011) "Growing Pains"

=== Self-published ===
- Heart Seed Snow Circuit (2007)
- Searching For Cassady (2007)
- Radiator Days (2008)
- Pretty Little Book (2009)
- Drawn To You (with Erika Moen, 2009)
- Make Yourself Happy (2010)
- Mini-comics
  - Letters from the Bottom of the Sea (with Hope Larson, 2005)
  - My Addiction (2006)
  - French Milk minis (2009)
  - The Fast (2009)
  - "Paris Journal" (2009)
  - "Salvaged Parts" (2010)

=== Albums ===
- Sweet Violet (2006)
- Pretty/Nerdy (2007)
- Comics Tunes By and For Us Comics Goons (compilation, 2007)

=== Illustrations ===
- Beautiful Cadavers by Liam Jennings (Cover art, 2010)
- Margaret And The Moon: How Margaret Hamilton Saved the First Lunar Landing by Dean Robbins (Illustrations, 2017, Knopf Books for Young Readers, ISBN 9780399551857)
- Love, Penelope: Letters from a big sister who knows about life by Joanne Rocklin (illustrations, 2018, Amulet Books, ISBN 9781419728617)
