= Western Tread Recordings =

- Founded: 2003
- Founder: Jim Adkins; Charlie Levy
- Genre: Rock
- Country of origin: U.S.
- Location: Tempe, Arizona

Western Tread Recordings was an independent record label based in Tempe, Arizona. It was owned and operated by Jim Adkins of Jimmy Eat World and music-promoter Charlie Levy.

== History ==
While commiserating one evening over dinner over the lack of label representation in the Southwest, friends Jim Adkins of Jimmy Eat World and Charlie Levy, a well-connected music promoter, decided to start their own label. Their chief goal was to showcase Arizona's fledgling talents through a steady slate of CD, EP, vinyl, and 7-inch releases, and to focus on releasing Jimmy Eat World records on vinyl. Their first releases included EP by the Format, a vinyl version of Jimmy Eat World's Bleed American, and The Bull, the Balloon, and the Family by Reubens Accomplice.

Even though Western Tread expanded over time, it remained strictly a part-time venture for both Adkins and Levy. This label now appears to be dormant. While being interviewed by Matt Pryor of The Get Up Kids during his Nothing to Write Home About Podcast, Adkins stated that the label is not exactly dead, but, at this point, serves only as a catalog of music.

== Bands ==
- Dopamine
- The Format
- Jimmy Eat World
- Less Pain Forever
- Peachcake
- Reubens Accomplice
- Tickertape Parade
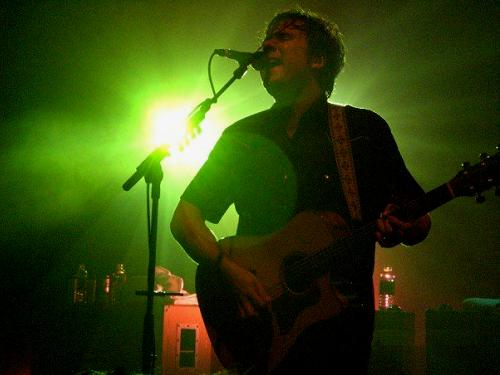
Jimmy Eat World

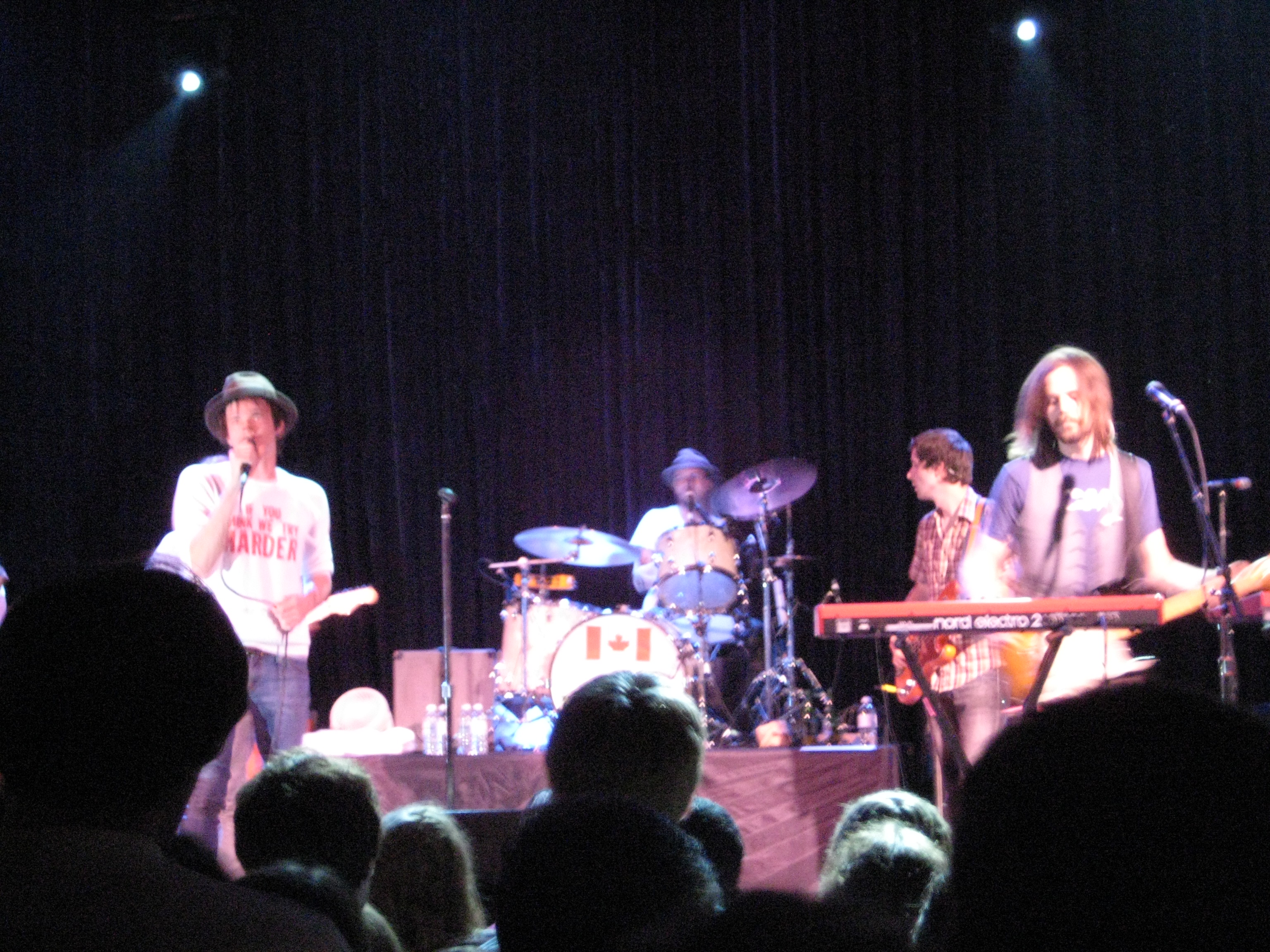
The Format

== Discography ==
| Title | Artist | Notes |
|---|---|---|
| EP | The Format | |
| The Bull, the Balloon, and the Family | Reubens Accomplice | |
| Bleed American | Jimmy Eat World | Vinyl version of best-selling album, originally released by DreamWorks Records. Contains bonus track: Splash, Turn, Twist. |
| Self-Titled | Tickertape Parade | |
| Now We Have Something To Celebrate | Peachcake & Less Pain Forever | Split EP |
| Dopamine/Reubens Accomplice | Dopamine & Reubens Accomplice | Split EP |
| Futures | Jimmy Eat World | Vinyl release of album originally released by Interscope Records. Included the bonus track Shame. |
| Chase This Light | Jimmy Eat World | Vinyl release of album originally released by Interscope Records. |
