= Snails (EP) =

EP by The Format
- Released: April 8, 2005
- Studio: Sound City (Van Nuys, CA)
- Genre: Rock
- Length: 19:45
- Label: Atlantic
- Producer: George Drakoulias

The Format chronology
Interventions + Lullabies (2003)	Snails (2005)	Dog Problems (2006)

Professional ratings
Review scores
Source	Rating
IGN	8.5/10

Snails is the second EP and third release by American rock band The Format. The EP was created to be sold at shows while The Format were on tour with Taking Back Sunday and Jimmy Eat World. It also became available on iTunes. Physical copies of the album came with a promotional code to download 2 additional tracks from The Format's website. The EP includes two new songs (four if you count the free downloads) and acoustic versions of three tracks from 2003's Interventions + Lullabies.

== Atlantic Records ==
After their record label, Elektra Records, was absorbed into the Warner Bros. system, The Format were moved to Atlantic Records. Atlantic released this EP, to allow The Format new material to sell while on tour with Taking Back Sunday and Jimmy Eat World, as it had been almost two years since they had released an album. The EP was first sold two days before the beginning of this tour, when The Format played a headlining show at The Green Door in Oklahoma City. The new tracks were intended as demo versions of songs that would appear on their second album, however, "Snails" is the only song from this EP that was re-recorded for Dog Problems. Shortly after the release of this EP, The Format were dropped from Atlantic Records.

== Bonus tracks ==
The Format intended to include "Your New Name" and "Dear Boy" on physical copies of the EP. These tracks were recorded with a different producer than the rest of the EP and due to contractual conflicts, could not be included. The band instead gave away a promotional code with copies of the EP, which allowed you to download the songs for free from their website. Because of this, most people consider the songs to be tracks 6 and 7 on the EP. Digital versions of the EP suffered from the same contractual problems, but couldn't accommodate the promotional code. Anyone who purchases the EP digitally will only have access to the first 5 tracks. The outro track with the credits plays a digitized version of "Spanish Flea" by Herb Alpert in the background.

== Re-Release ==
On May 28, 2007 Snails was re-released on iTunes including both bonus songs "Your New Name" & "Dear Boy" plus a special live version of the title track "Snails".

== Track listing ==
All tracks written by Sam Means and Nate Ruess.

Main EP

1. "Janet" – 3:48
2. "Snails" – 4:04
3. "Wait, Wait, Wait" (acoustic) – 3:11
4. "Tune Out" (acoustic) – 3:15
5. "On Your Porch" (acoustic) – 5:27

Re-release and bonus download tracks

6. "Your New Name" – 5:20
7. "Dear Boy" – 3:22
8. "Snails" (live) – 4:28
9. "Credits"
