= EP (The Format EP) =

EP by The Format
- Released: August 9, 2002
- Recorded: Flying Blanket Recording; Mesa, AZ
- Genre: Rock
- Length: 20:21
- Label: Self-released
- Producer: Bob Hoag

The Format chronology
EP (2002)	Interventions + Lullabies (2003)

EP was the first EP and first release by American rock band the Format. It was self-released on August 9, 2002. It was re-released on September 30, 2003 via Western Tread Recordings, which is owned by Jim Adkins of Jimmy Eat World. The success of "The First Single" on Phoenix rock radio station KEDJ caught the attention of many major record labels and ultimately led to The Format signing with Elektra Records.

There exists a rare demo of "At the Wake," with its former title "Piano Song" this version of the songs includes a longer intro (with some extra drums) and different lyrics.

== Color scheme ==
The original self-released version of EP had an orange color scheme, while The Western Tread re-release changes the color scheme of the artwork with each pressing. Western Tread's first pressing had a red color scheme, the second had a brown color scheme, the third had a green color scheme, and the 2016 vinyl reprinting of the EP had a salmon color scheme.

== Title ==
The simple title of this release caused much confusion among fans, leading many to believe it was either self-titled (i.e. "The Format") or called "The EP." The correct title is simply "EP."

== Track listing ==
All tracks written by Sam Means and Nate Ruess.

1. "The First Single" – 4:26
2. "At the Wake" – 4:22
3. "One Shot, Two Shots" – 3:24
4. "Let's Make This Moment a Crime" – 4:26
5. "Even Better Yet" – 3:43

== Personnel ==
- Sam Means – piano, keyboards, guitars
- Nate Ruess – vocals

Other personnel

- Bob Hoag – additional playing, recorded, produced, mixed and engineered
- Chris Serafini – additional playing
- Matt Murman – mastering
