= Get Back Loretta =

American funk-rock ensemble

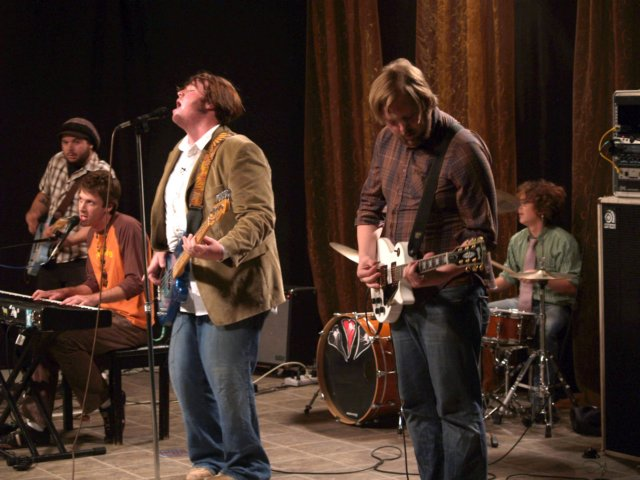
- Get Back Loretta in 2006

Background information
- Origin: San Diego, California, United States
- Genres: Alternative rock
- Years active: 2004–present
- Label: Pacific
- Members: Steven Bradford, Kevin Martin, Isaac Cass, Santino Romeri, Josh Cass
- Website: Official website

Get Back Loretta is a funk-rock ensemble from San Diego, California. The band consists of Steven Bradford (vocals, bass); Kevin Martin (vocals, piano); Isaac Cass (drums); Josh Cass (guitar); and Sonny Romeri (guitar). They have received San Diego Music Awards including "Best New Artist" in 2005, "Best Pop" in 2006, 2007 and 2008 and "Best Pop Album" in 2007 for "Over The Wall".

The band's name is derived from a line of The Beatles' song "Get Back".

It was said that the original members of get Get Back Loretta formed under the old band name Beast Weasley and the Whistling Weasels. Then front man Aaron Lewis got too drunk at a Vista House Party to perform. Steven Bradford, being a longtime fan, saw this as an opportunity to be in B.W.W.W. That is when Steven Bradford Joined and immediately changed the band name to Get Back Loretta.

== Discography ==
=== Albums ===
- Over The Wall (2006)
- Where Did You Go? (2009)

=== EPs and singles ===
- "Follow The Leader" (1998)
- "My Own Prison" (2001)
- Get Back Loretta EP (2005)
- "Winter Bloo: An Aural Companion to Side A" (2007) * Vinyl Release by Poseur Ink.
