= Sam Means (musician) =

American musician

- Born: Samuel Thomas Means
- Origin: Phoenix, Arizona, U.S.
- Genres: Indie pop; indie rock; alternative rock
- Occupations: Songwriter; producer; musician
- Instruments: Vocals; guitar; keyboards; banjo; percussion; saxophone
- Years active: 1999–present
- Labels: Elektra; Atlantic; Sony Music; Photo Finish; Hello Records
- Member of: The Format; Destry
- Website: sammeansmusic.com

Samuel Thomas Means is an American musician, producer, and songwriter, best known for his work with Arizona-based indie pop band The Format who returned from a nearly two decade hiatus in September 2025 and announced a new album October 6, 2025.

== Music career ==
Sam Means and Nate Ruess left their previous bands Nevergonnascore and This Past Year and formed the indie-pop duo, The Format, in February 2000. The Format announced a hiatus on February 4, 2008.

On September 29, 2009, Means released the original motion picture soundtrack for the indie film The Sinking of Santa Isabel.

On April 21, 2012, Means released an exclusive 7" for Record Store Day, titled, NONA, on Photo Finish Records. The 7" features an A and B side, with a digital download card for three additional tracks, including a cover of The Hollies' "Carrie Anne".

On April 19, 2014, Means released his second exclusive 7" for Record Store Day, titled, Blue Jeans, on Photo Finish Records. The A Side and title track, "Blue Jeans", is a Lana Del Rey cover, featuring Anthony Green of Circa Survive on lead vocals, with Sizzy Rocket singing back up.

On January 22, 2016, Means released his debut full-length album, 10 Songs on Hello Records. The album reunited Means with his The Format bandmates Don Raymond, Marko Buzzard, Mike Schey, and John O'Riley, along with Dog Problems producer Steven McDonald and arranger Roger Joseph Manning Jr.

The Format reunited for a surprise show on February 3, 2020, performing in Hello Merch's event space. The next day, a brief reunion tour was announced, but would later be canceled due to the COVID-19 pandemic.

On October 12, 2020, Means released a 5-track EP titled, I'm Sorry. Means wrote, "I wrote and recorded a little 5 song EP in my laundry this week, while the girls were out of town." The EP was released digitally and on cassette.

== Business venture ==
In the wake of the Format’s hiatus, Means and his wife, Anita, started a company in Phoenix, Arizona called Hello Merch. According to Hello Merch's website, "[the company] started in 2008 as an outlet for bands, musicians, creative artists and businesses to manufacture and sell merchandise anywhere, without giving up their rights."

The company moved locations numerous times during its early years due to outgrowing the spaces. The company has since found a sizable warehouse at 850 W. Lincoln in Phoenix’s historic warehouse district that they revitalized in 2019. Over the years, Means has extended the Hello brand to other ventures, including an apparel line, a record label, a screen printing and record pressing services, and event space.

The company had worked with many local organizations in creating merchandise such as the Phoenix Suns, the Crescent Ballroom, and the ZONA music festival. They also create merch for numerous well known musicians such as Bebe Rexha, K.Flay, Smallpools, Tori Amos.

== Discography ==
For Means' releases with The Format, see The Format discography.

=== Studio albums ===
Year	Artist	Title	Credit	Label
2016	Sam Means	10 Songs	Writer, performer	Hello Records

=== EPs ===
Year	Artist	Title	Credit	Label
2012	Sam Means	NONA	Writer, performer, producer, engineer	Photo Finish Records
2020	Sam Means	I'm Sorry	Writer, performer, producer, engineer	Hello Records

=== Various artist compilations ===
Year	Artist	Title	Track	Label
2009	Sam Means	Phoenix: We Love It	"Yeah Yeah"	Stinkweeds
2009	Sam Means	Sons of Men Single EP	"No Motion" (Reuben's Accomplice cover)	Western Tread Recordings
2011	Sam Means	Can I Borrow This? Vol. 1	"Big Drag" (Limbeck cover)	Burning House Records
2014	Sam Means	HairBrained (Original Motion Picture Soundtrack)	"Yeah Yeah" & "Run Away"	Legacy Recordings
2014	Sam Means	538 Hitzone 68	"Yeah Yeah"	Universal Music
2014	Sam Means	100X Winter 2014	"Yeah Yeah"	Universal Music

=== Soundtracks ===
Year	Artist	Title	Credit	Label
2009	Sam Means	The Sinking of Santa Isabel	Writer, performer, producer, engineer, Mixer	The Vanity Label

=== Features ===
Year	Artist	Title	Track	Credit	Label
2009	FUN.	Aim and Ignite	All Tracks	Writer	Fueled by Ramen
2009	Destry	It Goes On	"Big Mouths," "Home Isn't Home," "So Far Away," and "Took The Money"	Writer, performer	Paper + Plastick Records
2010	Hellogoodbye	Would It Kill You?	I "Never Can Relax"	Performer	Wasted Summer
2013	FUN.	Some Nights EP	"At Least I'm Not as Sad (As I Used To Be)," "All the Pretty Girls," and "Walking the Dog"	Writer	Fueled by Ramen
2020	Anthony Green ft. Steven McDonald and Sam Means	"Don't Forget Me" Single	"Don't Forget Me" (Harry Nilsson cover)	Performer	Hello Records

=== Singles ===
Year	Artist	Track	Credit	Label
2009	Sam Means	"Yeah Yeah"	Writer, performer, producer, engineer, Mixer	The Vanity Label
2011	Sayid & The Torturers	"SICK"	Writer, performer, producer, engineer, Mixer	Apples & Olive
2011	Sam Means	"Christmas All Over Again" (Tom Petty cover)	Performer, producer, engineer, Mixer	Apples & Olive
2012	Sam Means	"I Will" (The Beatles cover)	Performer, producer, engineer, Mixer	Apples & Olive
2014	Sam Means	"Little Song"	Writer, performer, producer, engineer, Mixer	Apples & Olive
2014	Sam Means	"Blue Jeans" (Featuring Anthony Green & Sizzy Rocket)	Performer, producer, engineer	Photo Finish Records
2020	Sam Means	"The King of Carrot Flowers, Pt. 1" (Neutral Milk Hotel cover)	Performer, producer, engineer	Hello Records
2020	Sam Means	"Where Is My Mind?" (Pixies cover)	Performer, producer, engineer	Hello Records
