= Interventions + Lullabies =

Studio album by The Format
- Released: October 21, 2003
- Recorded: May 2003
- Studio: Mesmer (Culver City, CA)
- Genre: Indie pop, power pop
- Length: 45:25
- Label: Elektra
- Producer: R. Walt Vincent

The Format chronology
EP (2002)	Interventions + Lullabies (2003)	Snails (2005)

Singles from Interventions + Lullabies
- 1. "The First Single" Released: October 14, 2003

Professional ratings
Review scores
Source	Rating
AllMusic	3/5 stars
Melodic	3/5 stars
Sputnikmusic	4/5

Interventions + Lullabies is the first album and second release by American rock band The Format. Produced and recorded by R. Walt Vincent, it was released on October 21, 2003, on Elektra Records. The album did not produce any hit singles. This is possibly due to the absorption of Elektra Records into Warner Bros. Records and Atlantic Records shortly after the album's release.

The album's title originates from lyrics in the track "I'm Ready, I Am."

== Release ==
In October and November 2003, the group supported Something Corporate on their headlining US tour. Interventions + Lullabies was released on Elektra Records on October 21. In November, the band toured with Straylight Run. "The First Single" was released to radio on January 27, 2004. In March 2004, Elektra was absorbed into Warner Bros. Records and Atlantic Records. This move allowed parent company Warner Bros. to eliminate any artists and employees who were considered a liability, without having to fulfill contractual obligations. The Format first believed themselves to be dropped, but then learned that their contract had been picked up by Atlantic Records. Unfortunately for The Format, Atlantic had decided not to invest any time or money into Intervention + Lullabies and instead instructed them to simply record a second album similar to their debut. In March and April, the band supported Yellowcard and Something Corporate on their co-headlining tour of the US. In June, the band appeared on a handful of dates on the Honda Civic Tour. For the next two months, they went on a headlining tour across the West Coast and Midwest. They were supported by Steel Train, Reuben's Accomplice, Jenoah, Hellogoodbye, Days Away, Maxeen and Robbers on High Street. In October 2004, they toured the US with Switchfoot and the Honorary Title.

== Track listing ==
All tracks are written by Sam Means and Nate Ruess.

Standard edition
No.	Title	Length
1.	"The First Single"	4:25
2.	"Wait, Wait, Wait"	3:13
3.	"Give It Up"	3:52
4.	"Tie the Rope"	3:19
5.	"Tune Out"	3:31
6.	"I'm Ready, I Am"	3:15
7.	"On Your Porch"	5:11
8.	"Sore Thumb"	3:18
9.	"A Mess to Be Made"	3:27
10.	"Let's Make This Moment a Crime"	3:51
11.	"Career Day"	5:44
12.	"A Save Situation"	2:19
Total length:		45:25

== Personnel ==
Personnel per AllMusic and liner notes.

The Format

- Nate Ruess - lead and backing vocals, handclaps
- Sam Means - piano, Fender Rhodes electric piano, keyboards, mellotron, electric and acoustic guitars, 12-string guitar, slide guitar, banjo, xylophone, baritone saxophone, handclaps

Additional Musicians

- R. Walt Vincent - bass guitar (tracks 1–6, 8–11), drums (tracks 5–6, 10–11), tambourine (tracks 1, 10), shaker (tracks 7, 9), Hammond organ (tracks 2, 9), Wurlitzer electric piano (tracks 3, 5), harmonium (track 7), melodica (track 11), backing vocals (track 8), piano (track 3), keyboards (track 9)
- Josh Freese - drums (tracks 1–2, 8)
- Charlie Paxson - drums (tracks 3–4, 9)
- Scott Higgins - guiro (track 3), sleigh bells (track 5)
- Rami Jaffee - accordion (track 9)
- Geoffrey Moore - electric guitar (track 6)
- Andrew Gross - orchestral arrangements, conductor (track 12)
- Joel Derouin - violin (track 12)
- Matthew Funes - violin (track 12)
- Michele Richards - violin (track 12)
- Larry Colbert - cello (track 12)
- Rick Shaw - double bass (track 12)
- Richard Todd - French horn (track 12)
- Joe Meyer - French horn (track 12)

Production and Design

- R. Walt Vincent - producer, engineering, mixing
- Josh Turner - engineering, assistant engineering, digital editing
- Aaron Lepley - assistant engineering
- Austen Lund - assistant engineering
- Chuck Bailey - assistant engineering
- Mike Clines - assistant engineering
- Mike Shipley - mixing
- Ben Grosse - mixing
- Christopher Fudurich - mixing
- Tom Rothrock - mixing
- Stephen Marcussen - mastering
- Jeremy Weiss - photography
- Daniel Kresco - assistant
- Danielle Bond - A&R
- John Kirkpatrick - A&R
- Steve Tramposch - A&R
