= Joywave discography =

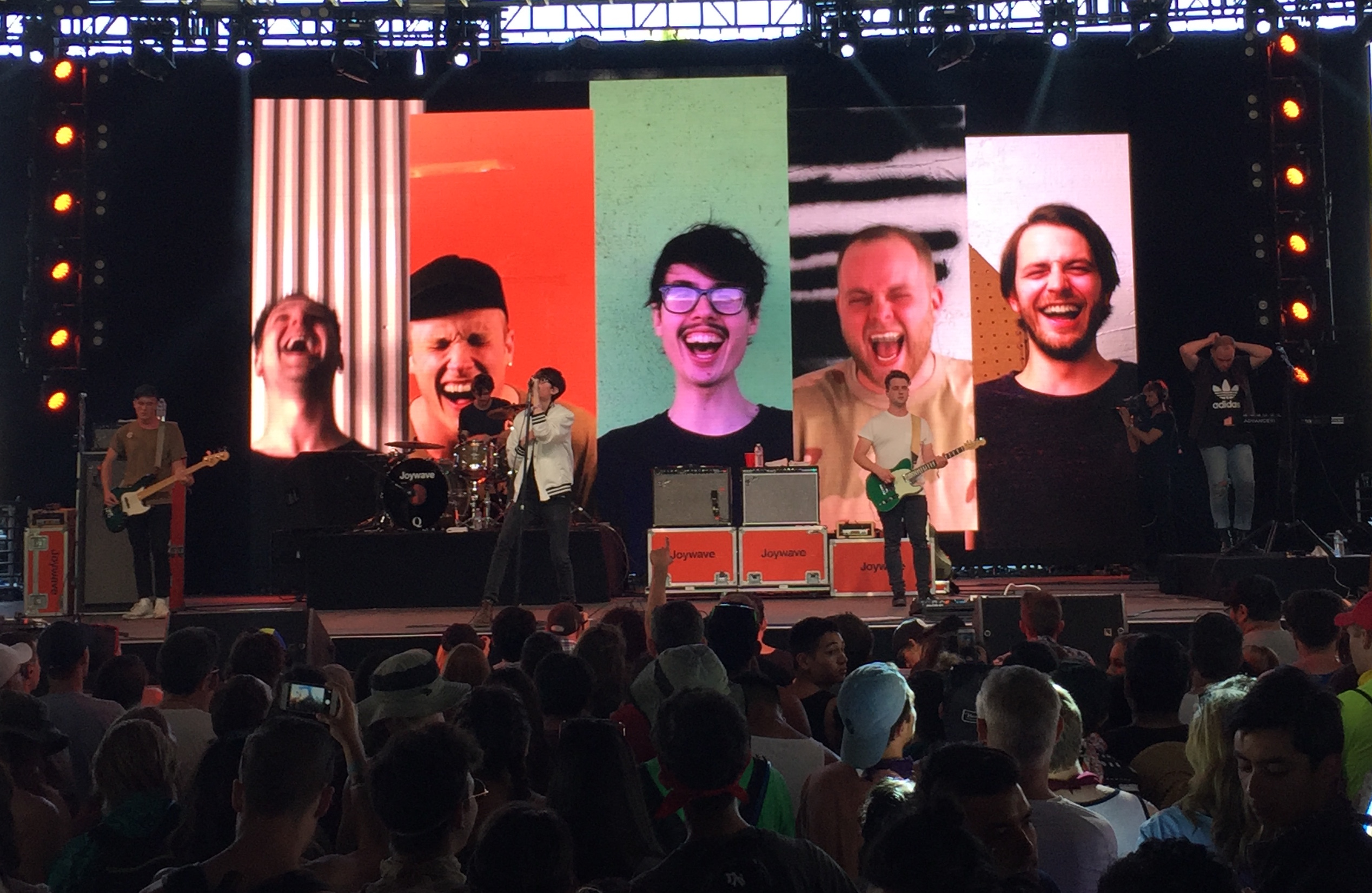
- Joywave performing in 2016
- Studio albums: 5
- EPs: 3
- Live albums: 1
- Compilation albums: 1
- Singles: 18
- Mixtapes: 2

The discography of American indie rock band Joywave consists of five studio albums, one remix/compilation album, three extended plays, two mixtapes, and 18 singles.

The band formed in 2010 and began releasing music the following year. They independently released their first mixtape, 77777, on March 14, 2011. Later that year, they released two singles, "Ridge" and "Traveling at the Speed of Light", the latter of which appeared on 77777. They released two more independent releases, the Koda Vista EP on March 27, 2012, and 88888 mixtape on April 15, 2013. Later in 2013, they appeared as a featured artist on the Big Data song "Dangerous", which became a number-one hit on the Billboard Alternative Songs chart and also reached No. 106 on the Hot 100. In the same year, they signed to major label Hollywood Records and founded their own label, Cultco Music, as an imprint of Hollywood. After releasing the EP How Do You Feel? in 2014, they released their debut studio album, How Do You Feel Now?, on April 21, 2015. The album was supported by four singles, all of which entered the Alternative Songs chart. The single "Tongues" also peaked at number 104 on Belgium's Flanders Ultratop chart.

The band released their second studio album, Content, on July 28, 2017. Two of its singles, "It's a Trip!" and "Doubt" entered the Alternative Songs and Rock Airplay charts. Their third studio album, Possession, was released on March 13, 2020. One of its singles, "Obsession", entered the Alternative Songs and Rock Airplay charts.

The band released their fourth studio album, Cleanse, on 11 February 2022, and subsequently went on tour in Europe and America. Their European shows concluded in November 2022, and their American shows concluded in November 2023. Out of the singles released, the highest performing was “Every Window is a Mirror”, which hit 32 on the US Alt charts in 2021.

Since the release of Cleanse, Joywave have since collaborated on a studio album from artist duo Best Frenz, consisting of Daniel Armbruster and Jason Suwito. The album was named The Mall and focused heavily on themes of escapism and youthful memories. It was preceded by singles “Throw Your Coins, Make A Wish”, “Flatline”, and “Everything's The Best!”. The album was met with mixed, yet favourable reviews from critics and fans.

== Albums ==
=== Studio albums ===
List of studio albums, with selected chart positions
Title	Album details	Peak chart positions			
Title	Album details	US Heat	US Alt	US Rock	UK Indie
How Do You Feel Now?	Released: April 21, 2015; Label: Hollywood, Cultco; Format: CD, LP, download	3	25	34	—
Content	Released: July 28, 2017; Label: Hollywood, Cultco; Format: CD, LP, download	8	— (Note: "Content" did not enter the Alternative Albums chart, but peaked at number 25 on the Alternative Album Sales chart.)	— (Note: "Content" did not enter the Top Rock Albums chart, but peaked at number 41 on the Rock Album Sales chart.)	—
Possession	Released: March 13, 2020; Label: Hollywood, Cultco; Format: CD, LP, download	—	—	—	—
Cleanse	Released: February 11, 2022; Label: Hollywood, Cultco; Format: LP, download	—	—	—	46
Permanent Pleasure	Released: May 17, 2024; Label: Hollywood, Cultco; Format: LP, download	—	—	—	—

=== Compilation albums ===
List of compilation albums
Title	Album details
Swish	Released: March 11, 2016; Label: Hollywood, Cultco; Format: Download

=== Live albums ===
List of live albums
Title	Album details
Live	Released: July 29, 2022; Label: Hollywood, Cultco; Format: Download

=== Mixtapes ===
List of mixtapes
Title	Album details
77777	Released: March 14, 2011; Label: Joywave Industries; Format: Download
88888	Released: April 15, 2013; Label: Joywave Industries; Format: Download

=== As featured artist ===
Title	Album Details
The Mall (by Best Frenz)	Released: August 11, 2023; Label: Best Frenz; Format: LP, download

== Extended plays ==
=== As lead artist ===
Title	Details
Koda Vista	Released: March 27, 2012; Label: Joywave Industries; Format: LP, download
How Do You Feel?	Released: March 11, 2014; Label: Hollywood, Cultco; Format: LP, download
Every Window Is a Mirror	Released: June 25, 2021; Label: Hollywood, Cultco; Format: Download

=== As featured artist ===
Title	Details
30% Off! (by Best Frenz)	Released: July 24, 2020; Label: Best Frenz; Format: LP, download

== Singles ==
=== As lead artist ===
Title	Year	Peak chart positions						Album
Title	Year	US Alt	US Dance	US Rock	BEL (FL) Tip	BEL (FL) Dance	CAN Rock	Album
"Ridge"	2011	—	—	—	—	—	—	—
"Traveling at the Speed of Light"	2011	—	—	—	—	—	—	77777
"Tongues" (featuring KOPPS)	2014	26	24	— (Note: "Tongues" did not enter the Hot Rock Songs chart, but peaked at number 48 on the Rock Airplay chart.)	54	42	—	How Do You Feel Now?
"Somebody New"	2014	15	—	45	—	—	43	How Do You Feel Now?
"Destruction"	2015	18	—	— (Note: "Destruction" did not enter the Hot Rock Songs chart, but peaked at number 30 on the Rock Airplay chart.)	—	—	36	How Do You Feel Now?
"Now"	2015	27	—	—	—	—	—	How Do You Feel Now?
"Content"	2017	—	—	—	—	—	—	Content
"It's a Trip!"	2017	24	—	— (Note: "It's a Trip!" did not enter the Hot Rock Songs chart, but peaked at number 39 on the Rock Airplay chart.)	—	—	—	Content
"Shutdown"	2017	—	—	—	—	—	—	Content
"Doubt"	2017	21	—	— (Note: "Doubt" did not enter the Hot Rock Songs chart, but peaked at number 42 on the Rock Airplay chart.)	—	—	—	Content
"Going to a Place"	2017	—	—	—	—	—	—	Content
"Compromise"	2018	—	—	—	—	—	—	—
"Blastoffff"	2018	—	—	—	—	—	—	Possession
"Like a Kennedy"	2019	—	—	—	—	—	—	Possession
"Obsession"	2019	23	—	— (Note: "Obsession" did not enter the Hot Rock Songs chart, but peaked at number 37 on the Rock Airplay chart.)	—	—	—	Possession
"Blank Slate"	2019	—	—	—	—	—	—	Possession
"Half Your Age"	2020	27	—	—	—	—	—	Possession
"After Coffee"	2021	—	—	—	—	—	—	Cleanse
"Every Window Is a Mirror"	2021	32	—	—	—	—	—	Cleanse
"Brain Damage"	2024	—	—	—	—	—	—	Permanent Pleasure
"Scared"	2024	39	—	—	—	—	—	Permanent Pleasure
"—" denotes a recording that did not chart or was not released in that territory.

=== As featured artist ===
Title	Year	Peak chart positions							Certifications	Album
Title	Year	US Bub.	US AAA	US Adult	US Alt	US Rock	CAN	CAN Rock	Certifications	Album
"Dangerous" (Big Data featuring Joywave)	2013	6	12	22	1	8	75	4	RIAA: Platinum; MC: Gold	2.0

== Music videos ==
Title	Year	Director(s)	Album
"Tongues"	2014	Daniels and Zak Stoltz	How Do You Feel Now?
"Somebody New"	2015	Keith Schofield	How Do You Feel Now?
"Destruction"	2016	Philip Andelman	How Do You Feel Now?
"It's a Trip!"	2017	Ghost and Cow	Content
"Doubt"	2018	Olivier Gondry	Content
"Like a Kennedy"	2019	Dear Mr Quistgaard	Possession
"Obsession"	2019	Laura Gorun, Cooper Roussel, and Dimitri Basil	Possession
"Blank Slate"	2019	Mr. Oz	Possession
"Half Your Age"	2020	Issac Rentz	Possession
"Every Window Is a Mirror"	2021	Jared Asher Harris	Cleanse
"Brain Damage"	2024	Dimitri Basil	Permanent Pleasure
"Scared"	2024	Dimitri Basil	Permanent Pleasure
