= Earth to Echo (soundtrack) =

Earth to Echo (Music from the Motion Picture) is the soundtrack to the 2014 film Earth to Echo released on July 1, 2014 by Relativity Music Group. The album featured 10 tracks that are featured in the film, along with a suite from the score composed by Joseph Trapanese. His score would be eventually released in a separate album on the same day.

== Original soundtrack ==
Earth to Echo (Music from the Motion Picture)

Soundtrack album by various artists
- Released: July 1, 2014
- Genre: Pop; rock; electronic
- Length: 51:37
- Label: Relativity Music Group

The soundtrack to the film consisted of pop, rock and electronic hits from The Mowgli's, Big Data, Breathe Carolina, Gospel Claws amongst various other artists. It was released on July 1, in digital and 180-gram vinyl formats, pressed upto 1,000 copies.

=== Track listing ===
No.	Title	Artist(s)	Length
1.	"Your Friend"	The Mowgli's	3:01
2.	"Live Like We'll Never Die"	Chiddy Bang feat. Youngblood Hawke	3:54
3.	"Dangerous"	Big Data	4:40
4.	"Opposite Sides"	Manchester Orchestra	3:06
5.	"21 Flights"	Heavy English	3:49
6.	"Best Friends"	Holychild	2:54
7.	"I Move Around"	Gospel Claws	3:24
8.	"Bang It Out"	Breathe Carolina feat. Karmin	4:12
9.	"Higher Road"	John Ralston	2:51
10.	"The Mighty Rio Grande"	This Will Destroy You	11:18
11.	"Earth to Echo Suite"	Joseph Trapanese	8:28
Total length:			51:37

== Original score ==
Earth to Echo (Original Motion Picture Score)

Film score by Joseph Trapanese
- Released: July 1, 2014
- Genre: Film score
- Length: 51:37
- Label: Relativity Music Group
- Producer: Joseph Trapanese

Joseph Trapanese chronology
The Raid 2 (2014)	Earth to Echo (2014)	Stand (2014)

=== Background ===
Being the first family-friendly found footage feature, where most films in the category either being horror thriller or disaster films such as The Blair Witch Project (1999) and Paranormal Activity (2007), Trapanese wanted the music to "bring proper depth of emotion to the film" which were broader and also had an intricate story that appeals to a wide range of demographic. Trapenese who scored action, science-fiction and thriller films felt scoring a family film as a challenge, where he would introduce to "brand new environments and have to filter so many new variables through our brain" and the end result is a combination of those variables filtered through their background and taste.

The score consisted mostly of synth music reminiscent of the 1980s. Trapanese attributed his collaborations to music productions of Daft Punk in the film score for Tron: Legacy (2010) and M83's score for Oblivion (2013), admitting that he made a distinct effort to create a "unique electronic palette that would complement the orchestra". During his discussions with Green, he wanted the orchestral portions to evoke the classic film music of their childhood but also wanted to use electronic music and synthesizer tools to create a score representing the story and the youth of their characters.

The first idea he sent on paper was using a chord progression from f major to d-flat major and ostinato bringing forth the "greatest strength and mystique of the character Echo" and provided foundation for the climax of the film. On top of that, he added a minor third motion moving half a step and coming down to a perfect fourth.

=== Track listing ===
No.	Title	Length
1.	"Just Kids"	2:13
2.	"The Move"	1:33
3.	"Miles From Home"	2:59
4.	"What Is It?"	3:44
5.	"In The Barn"	2:35
6.	"You Understood Us"	2:34
7.	"Your Name Is Echo"	4:44
8.	"Mannequin Girl"	1:24
9.	"Looking Home"	2:12
10.	"The Key"	1:38
11.	"Munch To The Rescue"	0:49
12.	"Night Lights"	3:25
13.	"Fallen Star"	2:18
14.	"Here It Goes"	1:38
15.	"The Way Home"	5:17
16.	"Echo"	2:34
17.	"Not Kids Anymore"	3:23
18.	"Worlds Away" (feat. Dia Frampton)	4:07
Total length:		49:07

=== Reception ===
Music critic Jonathan Broxton of Movie Music UK called the score as "nice enough" but could not interest musical score fans, unless "simple orchestral textures, homely guitar chords, and light electronic pulses push all your musical buttons." Thomas Glorieux of Maintitles found it as "solid and entertaining". Matt Patches of IGN wrote "Composer Joseph Trapanese pays homage to the melodic John Williams days while speaking a digital language kids understand." John Anderson of The Wall Street Journal commented that Trapanese's score "carries more than its share of emotional weight". Calling it as one of the film's highlights, James Rocchi of TheWrap praised Trapanese's score as it sounded remarkably "like the stylings of Explosions in the Sky". Matt DeTruck of City Newspaper criticised the music saying it "comes across as surface-level, early sketches of ideas, further hindered by extremely short track lengths that don't give the beats any time to develop". The score was shortlisted as one among the 114 contenders for the Academy Award for Best Original Score for the 87th Academy Awards but was not nominated.
