= The Through & Through Gospel Review =

American indie gospel music project

- Origin: Chandler, Arizona, United States
- Genres: Indie rock, Gospel
- Years active: 2011–present
- Label: Common Wall Media
- Members: Joel Marquard
- Website: thethroughthroughgospelreview.bandcamp.com/album/the-through-through-gospel-review

The Through & Through Gospel Review is Joel Marquard's indie-gospel solo-project. It is based out of Chandler, Arizona.

== History ==
On October 4, 2011, Common Wall Media announced through its website that it was releasing a new solo-record by Joel Marquard of Gospel Claws, seemingly because he had recorded it all on his own without telling anybody. Marquard wrote some of its songs in 2007, while he was still a part of Dear and the Headlights. The majority of the album was played by Marquard, alone with a Pro Tools rig, a 1970s reel to reel and cassette tapes, in his suburban home, though musical friends and family pitch in here and there on the record. He even sampled music from his father's own 1967 gospel record, recorded when Marquard's father was the same age as Marquard.

The LP was released by Common Wall Media as a "pay-what-you-want" album through Bandcamp, although Marquard has burned a few CD-Rs, photocopied and the album art, and made them available at Gospel Claws' shows for the download averse.

While Marquard's bluesy-pop band Gospel Claws has noticeable gospel influences, The Through & Through Gospel Review is a departure from that music. Influencing Marquard for this project were the baptist songs of his upbringing. Marquard grew up the son of a minister. As a youth, he found music as well at the local library, including Songs of the Old Regular Baptists (a collection of 50s field recordings) and Fire in My Bones: Raw Rare + Other-Worldly African-American Gospel [1944–2007] (a rare record featuring the work of Phoenix-based street evangelist Reverend Louis Overstreet).

His first solo-recording effort met with positive reviews. One critic found the record to be "fun." Noting the efforts that Marquard went through to make the album sound like an old recording, with all of the static and crackling of an old vinyl LP, Collin Fletcher wrote that the record had a truly authentic sound that he "loved." Another critic placed it on his list of top local releases for 2011.

Although his recordings made quite a splash in the scene, The Through & Through Gospel Review did not perform live until the "Balls Benefit Show," a concert organized for Marquard's benefit, to help him with his medical bills after a bout with testicular cancer. To help him, his live band consisted of various other members of Gospel Claws, J.D. Stooks, Bob Hoag, Rob Withem of Fine China, and many others. The Phoenix New Times named the "Balls Benefit Show," and specifically the performance done by The Through & Through Gospel Review, as the best club show of 2012, and one of the twenty best concerts in Phoenix in 2012.

== Discography ==
- Self-titled LP (Common Wall Media, 2011)
- On the Lord's Wrecking Crew (Common Wall Media, 2015)
