= Andros Rodriguez =

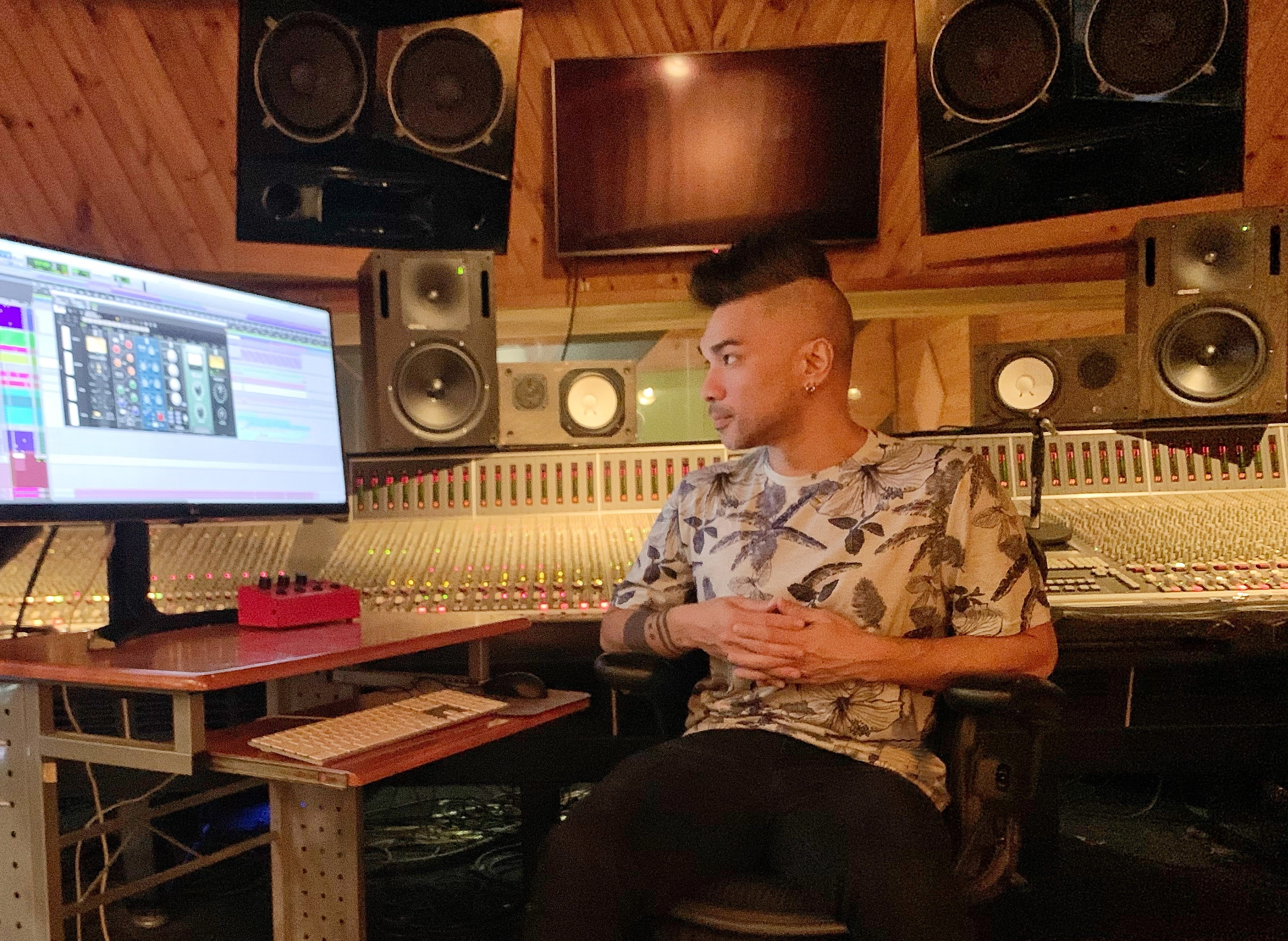

Andros Rodriguez is an American, multi-platinum, Grammy award-winning record producer, audio engineer and mixer. His diverse catalog of clients include Pharrell, Justin Timberlake, Christina Aguilera, Florence + the Machine, Shakira, Bleachers, Whitney Houston, Cobra Starship, Santigold, Jewel, Lenny Kravitz, Kelly Clarkson, Girls' Generation, Patti LaBelle, James Blunt, Ludacris, and Huang Zitao.

== History ==
A native of Washington, D.C., Rodriguez began his career recording local bands. In 2002, he moved to New York City and eventually earned the position of chief engineer at Quad Studios. Since then he has gone on to work with artists around the world. He is well known for his work with Shakira and was the co-producer and engineer for the Super Bowl LIV halftime show.

== Selected discography ==
- Madonna - MDNA- Engineer
- Justin Timberlake - FutureSex/LoveSounds - Engineer
- Santigold - Master of My Make-Believe - Engineer
- Shakira - She Wolf - Engineer/ Mixing
- Lion Babe - Begin - Engineer/ Mixing
- Joywave - How Do You Feel Now? - Engineer
- Take That - III - Mixing
- Shakira - Sale el Sol - Engineer/ Mixing
- Haerts - Haerts - Engineer
- Bone Thugs-N-Harmony - Strength & Loyalty - Engineer/ Mixing
- Shakira - Waka Waka (This Time for Africa) - Engineer/ Mixing
- Christina Aguilera - Bionic - Engineer
- Nicola Roberts - Cinderella's Eyes - Mixing
- Oh Land - Wishbone - Engineer/ Mixing
- Cobra Starship - While the City Sleeps, We Rule the Streets - Engineer/ Mixing
- Jazmine Sullivan - Love Me Back - Engineer
- Hugo - Old Tyme Religion - Engineer
- The Dance Party - Tigers - Producer/ Engineer/ Mixing
- Anberlin - Cities (Live in New York City) - Engineer
- The Kickdrums - Thinking Out Loud - Producer/ Engineer/ Mixing Composer
- Toshinobu Kubota - Time to Share - Assistant Engineer
