= How Do You Feel =

How Do You Feel may refer to:

- How Do You Feel?, a 2014 EP by Joywave
- "How Do Ya Feel", a song by Five from their 1999 album Invincible
