= Somebody New =

Somebody New may refer to:

- "Somebody New" (Billy Ray Cyrus song), a 1993 song by Billy Ray Cyrus, also recorded by Jill King
- "Somebody New" (Joywave song), a 2014 song by Joywave
- Somebody New (album), a 1996 album by Rhett Akins, or its title track
- "Somebody New", a 2018 song by Olly Murs from You Know I Know
