= Small Steps =

Small Steps may refer to:

- Small Steps (novel), a novel by Louis Sachar
- Small Steps (album), an album by Heiruspecs
- Small Steps: The Year I Got Polio, a book by Peg Kehret

== See also ==
- Small Steps, Heavy Hooves, an album by Dear and the Headlights
- Small step semantics, in computer science
