= Common Wall Media =

Independent record label and media company

- Founded: 2005
- Founder: Chuckie Duff
- Genre: Rock
- Country of origin: U.S.
- Location: Mesa, Arizona
- Official website: commonwall.com

Common Wall Media is an independent record label, film production, and media company based in Mesa, Arizona. It is owned and operated by Chuckie Duff, former Dear and the Headlights bassist and current co-owner of Flying Blanket Recording.

== History ==
During his time as both a local musician and while working as co-owner of Flying Blanket Recording with music producer Bob Hoag, Chuckie Duff created strong connections within the Arizona music scene. While some of these connections led to his own musical success in Dear and the Headlights, they also developed relationships that have allowed him to promote and release records that are gaining national attention. For example, Common Wall Media artist Gospel Claws was featured on NPR, and Snake! Snake! Snakes!'s self-titled EP was the ninth most-added record on college radio.

Common Wall's distribution deal with Modern Arts Records has also significantly helped in increasing the exposure that each of its bands receive.

Common Wall Media has also branched out beyond music to produce a short film titled Cost of Living. The film starred Brandon Routh, Mary Elizabeth Winstead and Bret Harrison.

== Bands ==
- Before Braille
- Bogan Via
- Dear and the Headlights
- El Sonida de Reposa
- Fine China
- The Foxglove Hunt
- Future Loves Past
- Gospel Claws
- The Reflection
- Snake! Snake! Snakes!
- The Through & Through Gospel Review

== Discography ==
Title	Artist	Notes
1st Demo	Dear and the Headlights	Before signing to Equal Vision Records, Common Wall Media recorded and released this promotional demo. The only song here that did not make it on Dear and the Headlights' debut full-length is "Daysleeper." These songs are available on Common Wall's website.
2nd Demo	Dear and the Headlights	Second promotional demo recorded and released by Common Wall Media. All of these songs made it onto Dear and the Headlights' debut full-length, Small Steps, Heavy Hooves.
The Jaws of Life	Fine China	Fine China's final album. One of these tracks appeared on the television show, The O.C.
Tired of Not Being Away From Here	Before Braille	This is a UK import, released in Europe by You and Whose Army? Records, and in the United States by Common Wall and Sunset Alliance.
This is Flying Blanket, Vol. 1	Various Artists	Limited edition (1000 pressed) compilation, featuring recordings made at Flying Blanket Recording, a studio owned by Duff and Bob Hoag. Featuring: Dear and the Headlights, Poem, Sister Cities, The Foxglove Hunt, Black Carl, XRayOK, Nate Stone, Neba, Dorsey, The Go Reflex, Juicy Newt, Tugboat, JD Stooks, Sugar High, The Breadwinners, The Break-Up Society, Life in Stereo, Hour of the Wolf, Heist at Hand, Art for Starters.
Stop Heartbeat	The Foxglove Hunt	
Heaventown	The Reflection	
Self-titled EP	Gospel Claws	
Roman Road	Gospel Claws	Bonus track released as a digital single.
I Don't Want to Care Anymore	Gospel Claws	Bonus track released as a digital single.
Built My Fortress EP	The Foxglove Hunt	Contains three new songs and three “live” (acoustic instrument) mixes.
This is Flying Blanket, Vol. 2	Various Artists	Limited edition (2000 pressed). Contains many exclusive songs. Features: Sister Cities, Austin Gibbs, Dear and the Headlights, Black Carl, Back Ted N-Ted, Brian DeMarco, Gospel Claws, Sharkspeed, The Love Me Nots, The Smith Family Band, Kinch, The Foxglove Hunt, Seven Car Pileup, La Catrin, Hot Skin, Super Stereo, Neba, Telescope, What Laura Says, Courtney Marie Andrews.
Self-Titled EP	Snake! Snake! Snakes!	This EP received many accolades from national and college radio, Charting #23 on CMJ's top 200.
C-L-A-W-S	Gospel Claws	
I Can. I Will	Gospel Claws	Bonus track released as a digital single.
Self-Titled	The Through & Through Gospel Review	A "solo" record from Gospel Claws' Joel Marquard. Released as a digital download. Marquard also burned some CD-Rs, photocopied album art and made a handful available at Gospel Claws’ shows.
Outsider/Thieves	Snake! Snake! Snakes!	Single/B-Side
Self-Titled	El Sonida de Reposa	Recorded, Mixed and Performed by Flying Blanket Recording Studio Manager and Assistant Engineer Gerald J. Schoenherr, in the Reposa Room (Studio B) at Flying Blanket Recording, Mesa, AZ.
The Balls Benefit Compilation	Various Artists	This is a digitally compilation album, released in 2012, for the benefit of Joel Marquard, lead-singer and guitarist for Gospel Claws, to help pay for medical costs associated with his cancer diagnosis. It features the music of: Ladylike, Yellow Minute, Black Carl, Snake! Snake! Snakes!, Gospel Claws, What Laura Says, Sister Cities, Mergence, The Go Reflex, and El Sonida de Reposa.
Wait Up EP	Bogan Via	
Put Your Sunshine Away	Gospel Claws	A vinyl version of this LP was also released on President Gator Records.
Bogan Via Remix EP	Bogan Via	This is a remix of Bogan Via's Common Wall Debut, Wait Up, released digitally on Bandcamp. It features one original song by Bogan Via and remixes by WLFGNG DNGR, Spirit Cave, Miniature Tigers, Glass Theory, Geographer, and Joel Marquard (of Gospel Claws)
All the Luscious Plants	Future Loves Past	Release scheduled Fall 2013

== Filmography ==
Year	Title	Notes
2020	Teenage Badass	Distributed by Freestyle Digital Media
2021	Happily	
