= Gospel Claws (EP) =

Extended play by Gospel Claws

Gospel Claws EP

EP by Gospel Claws
- Released: February 16, 2009
- Recorded: Flying Blanket Recording
- Genre: Indie rock
- Length: 19:12
- Label: Common Wall Media
- Producers: Bob Hoag and Gospel Claws

Gospel Claws chronology
Gospel Claws EP (2009)	C-L-A-W-S (2010)

The Gospel Claws EP is the first studio recording released by the indie rock band Gospel Claws. It was released on February 16, 2009 by Common Wall Media.

== Album information ==
Members of Gospel Claws that appear on this record are: Joel Marquard, Scott Hall, Wesley Hilsabeck, John Michael Mulhern, and Sloan Walters. This album was produced and recorded at Flying Blanket Recording by Bob Hoag.

This record's cover art was created and designed by Chuckie Duff at Common Wall Media. According to Duff, he designed the cover "in Apple Motion, dropped it out to [an] old VHS cam and then took a picture of the TV."

== Reception ==
=== Critical reception ===
This first recorded effort received modest to positive reviews.

The reviewer at Absolutepunk was quite impressed by Gospel Claws' debut recording. In the Gospel Claws EP, he found "catchy hooks, impressive instrumentation, and solid harmonies.". In the end, he found it "extremely impressive to hear something so refreshing within today’s music scene. Not one filler track can be found on here." Brandon Nolta at Boise Weekly was equally impressed, enjoying its "new-retro vibe like the Strokes without falling down the fuzzy production rabbit hole." Finding that "even their weak stuff is stronger than a lot of bands can manage" he would conclude that Gospel Claws is "well worth your currency, no matter how inscrutable their name."

This record caught a bit of attention among the college radio stations as well. At WLUR (Washington and Lee's radio station), the critic found that while "[t]his isn't a change-your-life-it's-so-good band, . . . they're doing something worth acknowledging and checking out." While making comparisons to the likes of My Morning Jacket, Tom Waits, and Camera Obscura, Georgetown University's WGTB radio found that for their first EP, Gospel Claws still seemed to be doing a lot of experimenting. WRUV at the University of Vermont tended to agree, that this EP showed that the group was still experimenting with its sound, but still really enjoyed the "edginess/uniqueness of the last track– 'Don’t Let it Die'"

Professional ratings
Review scores
Source	Rating
Absolutepunk	82%

== Track listing ==
No.	Title	Length
1.	"God Keeps Me Alive"	4:21
2.	"Sing, Dance"	2:34
3.	"You Got It Bad"	4:12
4.	"Lost At Sea"	4:44
5.	"Don't Let it Die"	3:22
