= Drunk Like Bible Times =

Studio album by Dear and the Headlights
- Released: (United States) September 30, 2008
- Recorded: Flying Blanket Recording Studios, Mesa, Arizona
- Genre: Indie rock
- Length: 45:34
- Label: Equal Vision
- Producer: Bob Hoag

Dear and the Headlights chronology
Small Steps, Heavy Hooves (2007)	Drunk Like Bible Times (2008)

Professional ratings
Review scores
Source	Rating
AbsolutePunk.net	(75%)
Music Emissions	3.5/5 stars

Drunk Like Bible Times is the second and final studio album by Arizona-based indie rock band Dear and the Headlights. It was released on September 30, 2008 through independent record label Equal Vision Records.

In an interview about the album, lead singer Ian Metzger said he was inspired by an Allen Ginsberg poem when he wrote the song "Carl Solomon Blues."

== Track listing ==
No.	Title	Length
1.	"I'm Not Crying. You're Not Crying, Are You?"	2:56
2.	"Bad News"	3:08
3.	"Carl Solomon Blues"	3:20
4.	"Willetta"	5:26
5.	"Talk About"	3:43
6.	"Saintly Rows (Oh Oh)"	3:38
7.	"Flowers For My Brain"	4:10
8.	"Now It's Over"	3:11
9.	"Parallel Lines"	3:15
10.	"If Not For My Glasses"	2:50
11.	"Try"	4:43
12.	"I Know"	5:03
Total length:		45:34
