= Tongues (song) =

Single by Joywave featuring KOPPS

from the album How Do You Feel Now?, and the EP How Do You Feel?
- B-side: "Remixes"
- Released: February 9, 2014
- Recorded: 2013
- Genre: Indie pop, indietronica
- Length: 3:52
- Label: Cultco; Hollywood
- Songwriter(s): Daniel Armbruster; Sean Donnelly
- Producer(s): Daniel Armbruster; Sean Donnelly

Joywave singles chronology
| "Dangerous" (2013) | "Tongues" (2014) | "Somebody New" (2014) |

Music video
- "Tongues" on YouTube

"Tongues" is a song by American indie rock band Joywave and American electronic music band KOPPS. The song was released independently on April 9, 2013 and then through Cultco Music and Hollywood Records on February 9, 2014, was featured on the band's second extended play How Do You Feel?, and appeared on the band's debut studio album How Do You Feel Now?. The official music video for the song was uploaded on May 27, 2014 to the band's Vevo channel on YouTube. The song has been remixed by several artists, including Giorgio Moroder and Big Data. The song was featured on the soundtrack for the video game FIFA 15 and appears in a Nexus 6P advertisement.

== Music video ==
The official music video for the song, lasting three minutes and fifty-five seconds, was uploaded on May 27, 2014 to the band's Vevo channel on YouTube. The video, which also features a NSFW tag, was directed by duo DANIELS, who also worked on the MTV VMA-nominated music video for "Turn Down for What" by DJ Snake and Lil Jon.

== Track listing ==
=== CD-R ===
CD-R release
| No. | Title | Length |
|---|---|---|
| 1. | "Tongues" (featuring KOPPS) | 3:52 |
| 2. | "Tongues" (RAC Mix) | 3:27 |
| 3. | "Tongues" (Big Data Remix) | 3:44 |
| 4. | "Tongues" (Starsmith Remix) | 4:40 |

=== Digital download ===
| No. | Title | Length |
|---|---|---|
| 1. | "Tongues" (featuring KOPPS) | 3:52 |

== Charts ==
| Chart (2014) | Peak position |
|---|---|
| Belgium (Ultratip Bubbling Under Flanders) | 54 |
| Belgium Dance (Ultratop Flanders) | 42 |
| US Alternative Airplay (Billboard) | 26 |
| US Dance Club Songs (Billboard) | 24 |
| US Dance/Mix Show Airplay (Billboard) | 50 |
| US Rock & Alternative Airplay (Billboard) | 48 |

== Release history ==
| Region | Date | Label | Format |
|---|---|---|---|
| United States | February 9, 2014 | Cultco; Hollywood | Digital download |
| United States | March 2014 | Cultco | CD-R |
