= Possession (Joywave album) =

Studio album by Joywave
- Released: March 13, 2020
- Recorded: 2018–2019
- Studio: Joywave's studio (Rochester, New York)
- Genre: Indie pop; electropop; Indie rock
- Length: 40:18
- Label: Cultco; Hollywood
- Producer: Daniel Armbruster

Joywave chronology
Content (2017)	Possession (2020)	Cleanse (2022)

Singles from Possession
- 1. "Blastoffff" Released: July 12, 2018; 2. "Like a Kennedy" Released: June 21, 2019; 3. "Obsession" Released: August 9, 2019; 4. "Blank Slate" Released: November 1, 2019; 5. "Half Your Age" Released: January 7, 2020

Possession is the third studio album by American indie rock band Joywave. It was released on March 13, 2020, through their own Cultco Music label and Hollywood Records. The album was supported by five singles prior to release; "Blastoffff", "Like a Kennedy", "Obsession", "Blank Slate", and "Half Your Age".

== Recording and composition ==
Joywave recorded Possession at their studio in Rochester, New York. It was produced by band frontman Daniel Armbruster and mixed by Dan Grech-Marguerat. The recording of the album saw the band return to incorporating samples of audio into their songs. They had previously used audio samples of various Disney films for their debut album, How Do You Feel Now? (2015), but opted not to use samples at all for their following album, Content (2017). For Possession, the band used samples of audio from the Voyager Golden Record, a 1977 compilation of sounds (such as recordings taken of the tesla coils at the Rochester Museum and Science Center), spoken word pieces, and music curated by Carl Sagan, included on both Voyager space probes in order to create an image of life on Earth for any other lifeforms that might discover the spacecraft one day. The cover art for the Golden Record was also cited as the influence for the design of Possession's.

Regarding the premise of the album, Armbruster stated that it focuses on the concept of control, examining it on a more broad societal level as well as a personal level. He added that "our heads are spinning. Every day is crazier than the last. Every screen we walk by is shouting at us, demanding our undivided attention. Control over our own lives is constantly under siege". The opening track "Like a Kennedy" was written about media oversaturation in contemporary news cycles. "Obsession" was written about Armbruster's need to focus on distractions from other things, while "Blank Slate" is about making oneself open to challenge. "Half Your Age" was written about adjusting and moving on from failed dreams, to counter what Armbruster called "misplaced resiliency" in society.

== Promotion and release ==
Joywave released five singles over a span of 17 months leading up to the announcement of the album. The band chose to have a less conventional campaign for the album. They slowly released singles over a long period of time leading up to the album release, instead of the typical system of releasing the album first and then following it up with singles. Armbruster contrasted their album campaign to television shows on Netflix, which consumers are often able to view multiple episodes of in one sitting, therefore consuming the content all at once.

The first single released from Possession was "Blastoffff", released on July 12, 2018. On the same day, it was used in a trailer to promote the fifth season of battle royale video game Fortnite. The band did not release another single for 11 months, until the release of the song "Like a Kennedy" on June 21, 2019. The release was accompanied with a press release detailing their upcoming album as well as an announcement of dates for their "Possession Sessions" tour. A music video for the song draws a direct comparison between the contemporary news cycle and that of the 1960s by referencing the 1963 assassination of John F. Kennedy. The band released the song "Obsession" on August 9, which was accompanied with its own music video. The band eventually added extra dates to the tour, and also released the song "Blank Slate" on November 1. On January 7, 2020, the final single, "Half Your Age", was released. A music video for the song, shot in the style of a medication commercial, depicts a man disappointed with his life taking meds which magically reverse his age and improve his personal skills.

In conjunction with the release of the song "Half Your Age" On January 7, 2020, the band announced that the album would be released on March 13. The album's track list as well as dates for a North American tour were also revealed. However, the album's March 13 release date coincided with travel restrictions related to the COVID-19 pandemic, halting further promotion and the tour. The band performed their last live show of 2020 on March 1 in Berlin, Germany, before returning home to Rochester, where a state of emergency was declared on March 14. After a series of delays, the Possession Tour was officially canceled on February 22, 2021.

== Track listing ==
All lyrics are written by Daniel Armbruster; all music is composed by Joywave (Daniel Armbruster, Benjamin Bailey, Paul Brenner, Joseph Morinelli)

No.	Title	Length
1.	"Like a Kennedy"	4:08
2.	"Coming Apart"	2:56
3.	"Half Your Age"	3:30
4.	"Obsession"	3:06
5.	"Blank Slate"	2:58
6.	"F.E.A.R."	3:00
7.	"Funny Thing About Opinions"	3:13
8.	"Who Owns Who?"	2:36
9.	"Blastoffff"	3:16
10.	"Possession"	3:20
11.	"No Shoulder"	4:10
12.	"Mr. Eastman"	4:05
Total length:		40:18

== Personnel ==
Personnel adapted from album liner notes.

Joywave

- Daniel Armbruster – vocals, electric guitar, acoustic guitar, bass guitar, piano, keyboards, flute, shaker
- Benjamin Bailey – piano, electric guitar, acoustic guitar, keyboards, organ, theremin, recorder
- Paul Brenner – drums
- Joseph Morinelli – electric guitar, bass guitar, acoustic guitar

Additional musicians

- Jesse Blum – trumpet (track 12)
- Sameer Gadhia – backing vocals (track 2)

Technical personnel

- Daniel Armbruster – producer, engineer
- Dan Grech-Marguerat – mixing, programming
- John Hill – co-producer (track 2)
- Joe LaPorta – mastering
- Blake Mares – engineer
- Evyn Morgan – artwork, layout, photography

== Reception ==
=== Critical ===
Professional ratings
Review scores
Source	Rating
AllMusic	4/5 stars

The album was well-received upon its release. Neil Z. Yeung at AllMusic summed it up as "hypnotic, often dance-friendly beats bubble up beneath inventive sampling choices and melodic synths, balancing the occasional upbeat jam with dark, ominous soundscapes".

=== Commercial ===
The album reached number 34 in the iTunes Alternative Albums chart, and number 17 in Greece. The title track reached number 65 in Portugal.

== See also ==
- List of 2020 albums
