= You Make Me Hate Music =

Studio album by Fine China
- Released: March 26, 2002
- Genre: Indie rock
- Label: Tooth & Nail Records

Fine China chronology
When the World Sings (2000)	You Make Me Hate Music (2002)	Jaws of Life (2005)

Professional ratings
Review scores
Source	Rating
AllMusic	3.5/5 stars

You Make Me Hate Music is the second studio album by the indie rock band, Fine China. It was produced and recorded by Jason Martin of Starflyer 59 and Terry Scott Taylor of Lost Dogs and Daniel Amos.

== Track listing ==
1. "Hug Every Friend"
2. "The Unsuccessful"
3. "Rock Can't Last Forever"
4. "Don't Say Nothing"
5. "You Were a Saint"
6. "Boo to the Freaks"
7. "The World Wants Me Dead"
8. "Your Heart Was Made of Gold"
9. "You Ain't Happy"
10. "Forget the Experts"
