= 2.0 (Big Data album) =

Studio album by Big Data
- Released: March 20, 2015
- Recorded: 2013–15
- Genre: Electropop; indietronica; alternative dance; indie rock
- Length: 40:57
- Label: Wilcassettes; Warner Bros.
- Producer: Alan Wilkis

Big Data chronology
1.6 (2014)	2.0 (2015)	3.0 (2019)

Singles from 2.0
- 1. "Dangerous" Released: October 1, 2013; 2. "The Business of Emotion" Released: October 20, 2014

Professional ratings
Review scores
Source	Rating
AllMusic	4/5 stars
Herald Scotland	(favorable)

2.0 is the debut studio album by American electronic music band Big Data. It was released on March 20, 2015 under Warner Bros. Records. From the album, two singles have been released: "Dangerous" featuring indie rock band Joywave and "The Business of Emotion" featuring White Sea.

The album peaked at 75 on the Billboard 200 chart.

The song "Clean" featuring Jamie Lidell featured in the Konami video game Pro Evolution Soccer 2017; "The Business of Emotion" was re-recorded in Simlish for the video game The Sims 4. "Dangerous" was used in MLB 14: The Show and ads for TD Insurance in Canada. "Get Some Freedom" was used in Madden NFL 16.

== Track listing ==
All songs produced by Alan Wilkis.

No.	Title	Writer(s)	Length
1.	"The Business of Emotion" (featuring White Sea)	Alan Wilkis, Morgan Kibby	4:07
2.	"Dangerous" (featuring Joywave)	Wilkis, Daniel Armbruster	4:40
3.	"Clean" (featuring Jamie Lidell)	Wilkis, Jamie Lidell	3:21
4.	"The Glow" (featuring Kimbra)	Wilkis, Kimbra Johnson	4:24
5.	"Snowed In" (featuring Rivers Cuomo)	Wilkis, Rivers Cuomo	3:35
6.	"Big Dater"	Wilkis, Armbruster	4:25
7.	"Automatic" (featuring Jenn Wasner)	Wilkis, Jenn Wasner	5:14
8.	"Get Some Freedom" (featuring Dragonette)	Wilkis, Martina Sorbara	3:37
9.	"Sick for Me" (featuring Bear Hands)	Wilkis, Ted Feldman, Dylan Rau	3:39
10.	"Perfect Holiday" (featuring Twin Shadow)	Wilkis, George Lewis Jr.	3:55
Total length:			40:57
