= C-L-A-W-S =

Studio album by Gospel Claws
- Released: October 26, 2010
- Recorded: Flying Blanket Recording
- Genre: Indie rock
- Length: 46:44
- Labels: Common Wall Media; Modern Art Records
- Producers: Bob Hoag and Gospel Claws

Gospel Claws chronology
Self-titled EP (2009)	C-L-A-W-S (2010)	Put Your Sunshine Away (2012)

C-L-A-W-S is the second studio album and first LP recorded by the indie rock band Gospel Claws. It was released on October 26, 2010, by Common Wall Media.

== Album information ==
Gospel Claws band members featured on C-L-A-W-S are: Joel Marquard, Scott Hall, Wesley Hilsabeck, John Michael Mulhern, and Sloan Walters. The album was produced and recorded at Flying Blanket Recording by Bob Hoag. Unlike their previous recordings, which were tracked and then layered, this album was predominantly recorded live, with the exception of vocals and some additional instrumentation. Bob Hoag contributed to the recording by playing the Glockenspiel, Hammond Organ, and Tambourine, and also provided backing vocals. It was mastered at the Blasting Room by Jason Livermore and Chuckie Duff of Common Wall Media created the artwork.

The title of the album originates from the unique way that Joel Marquard, the band's lead vocalist, spells out the second half of the band's name during live performances. This practice was adopted to prevent confusion with the term “Gospel Clause”.

== Reception ==
=== Critical reception ===
C-L-A-W-S received a mostly favorable reception. Many critics praised Gospel Claws' upbeat album, calling it a "blend of gospel-and-surf-tinged indie pop, with some '50s style guitar licks", that creates "remarkabl[y] complex indie pop". At Phrequency.com, the critic declared that the album "is full of the type of slosh-y summer anthems that make you feel alive — from the pounding beat and stylish, CYHSY-style guitars of opener 'Walk me down' to the sing-song-y, campfire feel of 'Summer nights lakeside." After finding that C-L-A-W-S "initially may give the impression of a shallow and fleeting amusement," Travis Donovan at Death and Taxes found that "further visits reward the listener by revealing a deep reservoir of enduring redemption, wherein one finds a connection not only to their own childhood pleasures but the extolled imaginings of generations past." In the end, he qualified C-L-A-W-S as "one of the year's most unforgettable albums."

According to Ned Raggett at Allmusic.com, Gospel Claws' debut album "burst right out of the gate with a sound that is at once perfectly thrilling and perfectly obvious. Which sounds like damning with faint praise but there are no two ways around it." Hesitant to rave about the LP, he concluded that "Gospel Claws may still move further along with their approach over time, but for now they're fated to be in the slipstream of those bands that they clearly love to death.

Professional ratings
Review scores
Source	Rating
Allmusic	3/5 stars
The Arizona Republic	4/5 stars
The Phoenix New Times	B+
Death and Taxes	Favorable
Phrequency	Favorable

=== Commercial reception ===
C-L-A-W-S spent 5 weeks in the top 100 on CMJ Top 200 and 4 weeks on the FMQB Submodern charts, with the album peaking at No. 2 and the single "Walk me Down" at No. 6.

== Track listing ==
No.	Title	Length
1.	"Walk Me Down"	3:56
2.	"Summer Nights Lakeside"	3:34
3.	"Baby, I'll Take You Home"	5:16
4.	"Stars in My Heart"	4:56
5.	"Avenues"	4:08
6.	"Somebody Stole My Money"	1:49
7.	"Need for Speed"	5:24
8.	"Householder"	4:27
9.	"La Pequeña"	4:05
10.	"Greeley Estates"	4:36
11.	"Whispers & Talking"	4:33
