= When the World Sings =

When The World Sings

Studio album by Fine China
- Released: September 26, 2000
- Studios: The Green Room, Los Angeles, CA
- Genre: Indie rock
- Length: 35:54
- Label: Tooth & Nail Records

Fine China chronology
| When The World Sings (2000) | You Make Me Hate Music (2002) |

When The World Sings is the debut studio album by the indie rock band Fine China.

== Reception ==
Professional ratings
Review scores
| Source | Rating |
|---|---|
| AllMusic | 3/5 stars |
| Exclaim! | (favorable) |

Rob Ferraz of Exclaim! noted Fine China's "authentic sounding '80s new wave synth pop", adding, "It's almost difficult to call it retro, and you might think this quartet were from the UK instead of Phoenix, AZ. New Order, the Smiths, OMD - you can hear a bit of all of them in this sometimes melancholic record... This is the kind of thing that sounds dated and a little cheesy on the first listen, but it grows into a guilty pleasure after awhile."

== Track listing ==
1. "We Rock Harder Than You Ever Knew"
2. "Labor Saving Device"
3. "They Will Love Us for Our Instruments"
4. "When the World Sings"
5. "Give Us Treble"
6. "The Patient"
7. "For All Centuries"
8. "Comforting, Gondoliering"
9. "I Dropped a Bomb on Your Heart"
10. "Young, and Having Fun"
