= Content (Joywave album) =

Studio album by Joywave
- Released: July 28, 2017
- Recorded: 2016 in Bloomfield, New York
- Genres: Indie rock; electropop
- Length: 40:16
- Labels: Cultco; Hollywood
- Producers: Daniel Armbruster; Sean Donnelly

Joywave chronology
Swish (2016)	Content (2017)	Possession (2020)

Singles from Content
- 1. "Content" Released: April 20, 2017; 2. "It's a Trip!" Released: May 11, 2017; 3. "Shutdown" Released: June 1, 2017; 4. "Doubt" Released: June 15, 2017; 5. "Going to a Place" Released: July 6, 2017

Content (/kənˈtɛnt/) is the second studio album by American indie rock band Joywave, released through Cultco Music and Hollywood Records on July 28, 2017. The album is a follow-up to the band's debut full-length, How Do You Feel Now?, which was released in 2015. It was co-produced by band members Daniel Armbruster and Sean Donnelly and was recorded during 2016. Ahead of the album's release, five singles were released to promote the album: "Content", "It's a Trip!", "Shutdown", "Doubt", and "Going to a Place".

== Background and recording ==
Joywave previously released How Do You Feel Now?, their debut album, in 2015. Following up the record, the band began recording a new album in 2016. Content was recorded in a four-month span at a barn in Bloomfield, New York, 45 minutes away from the band's hometown of Rochester. Paul Brenner, the band's drummer, regarded the barn as a "very open space" that let the band create "natural sounds and tones". The drums on the record were recorded late at night, due to the microphones picking up outside noises, such as traffic. Though the band had used samples of Disney films while creating How Do You Feel Now?, the band chose not to use such samples for Content. Production was done by band members Daniel Armbruster and Sean Donnelly and mixing was done by Rich Costey.

== Promotion and release ==
Prior to the album's release, there were five songs from the album that were released for streaming. "Content" was released on April 20, 2017, "It's a Trip!" was released on May 11, "Shutdown" was released on June 1, "Doubt" was released on June 15, and "Going to a Place" was released on July 6. Joywave performed songs from Content at an album release party held at First Federal Plaza in Rochester. The album was released through Cultco Music and Hollywood Records. The digital download and CD versions were released on July 28. The vinyl release of the album was released on September 15.

== Reception ==
Professional ratings
Review scores
Source	Rating
AllMusic	4.5/5 stars
Pitchfork	5.9/10
The Irish Times	2/5 stars
Under the Radar	7/10

The album received mixed reviews when it was initially released. In his review for AllMusic, Neil Z. Yeung favorably compared it to the band's debut album by claiming that, "While How Do You Feel Now? managed to be a strong collection of catchy tunes, it was nonetheless quite similar to the output of many other contemporary synth rock outfits. On Content, the band focuses on mood and atmosphere, playing with space and exercising restraint for maximum effect." Stephen Mayne's review for Under the Radar was also complimentary, proclaiming that "quick switches, mixing styles and changing tempo, make Content so fascinating. It's the work of a band full of ideas, confident enough to throw them all together and accomplished enough to pull it off."

The review by Saby Reyes-Kulkarni at Pitchfork was more divisive in its evaluation of the album. Reyes-Kulkarni claimed that frontman Daniel Armbruster "isn't so much a ghost in the machine as a helpless presence unable to stand up to his own music", and concluded by stating that "If Content's songs are to be taken at face value, it's hard not to have your doubts." Jennifer Gannon of The Irish Times left a negative review, writing the album "sounds a little bit trite never mind presumptuous from a band yet to make their mark".

== Track listing ==
All tracks are written by Daniel Armbruster, Joseph Morinelli, Paul Brenner, Sean Donnelly, and Benjamin Bailey

No.	Title	Length
1.	"Content"	4:28
2.	"Shutdown"	3:42
3.	"It's a Trip!"	3:03
4.	"Rumors"	3:48
5.	"Confidence"	0:48
6.	"Doubt"	3:45
7.	"Going to a Place"	5:56
8.	"Little Lies You're Told"	3:18
9.	"When You're Bored"	3:13
10.	"Thanks. Thanks for Coming"	3:43
11.	"Let's Talk About Feelings"	4:32
Total length:		40:16

== Personnel ==
Joywave

- Daniel Armbruster – vocals, programming, arrangement, production, engineering, recording arrangement (all tracks); guitar (3, 4, 6, 8), piano (5), flute (7)
- Joseph Morinelli – guitar (2, 3, 6, 9)
- Paul Brenner – drums (1–3, 6–11)
- Sean Donnelly – programming, arrangement (all tracks); guitar (1, 3, 7, 8), alto saxophone (2–4, 6–10), art direction
- Benjamin Bailey – piano (11), art direction

Additional personnel

- Gentry Studer – mastering
- Rich Costey – mixing
- Martin Cooke – mixing assistance, engineering assistance
- Nicolas Fournier – mixing assistance, engineering assistance
- Arjun Baxter – upright bass (11)
- Alex Trochut – art direction, design
- Enny Joo – art direction

== Charts ==
Chart (2017)	Peak position
US Heatseekers Albums (Billboard)	8
