= Destruction (song) =

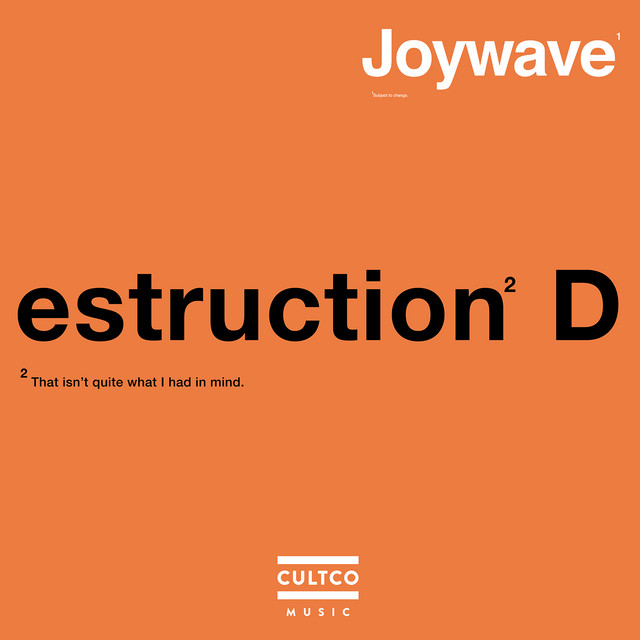

Single by Joywave

from the album How Do You Feel Now?
- Released: March 30, 2015
- Recorded: 2014
- Genre: Alternative rock; indie rock
- Length: 3:04
- Label: Cultco; Hollywood
- Songwriters: Daniel Armbruster; Sean Donnelly
- Producers: Daniel Armbruster; Sean Donnelly

Joywave singles chronology
| "Somebody New" (2014) | "Destruction" (2015) | "Now" (2015) |

Music video
- "Destruction" on YouTube

"Destruction" is a song by American indie rock band Joywave. It was released as a single from their debut studio album, How Do You Feel Now?, on March 30, 2015. A music video for the song was released on January 13, 2016 through YouTube. "Destruction" peaked at number 18 on the Billboard Alternative Songs chart and was featured on the soundtrack for the video games Madden NFL 16 and the 2015 Need for Speed reboot. An abridged version, consisting of just the first verse, chorus and outro, was used for the launch trailer for Fortnite Battle Royale. Joywave has been known to play the song repeatedly at live performances.

"Destruction" was also included on Joywave's compilation album Swish (released March 11, 2016) as the first track, followed by eight slightly remixed versions and a bonus track.

Front man Daniel Armbruster explains that he got the idea for "Destruction" while attending a music festival in Rochester, New York. "The house music was a mix of late 90s/early 00s feel good jams that I doubted some members of the audience had even been alive for. Everything felt so safe and calculated. I wanted the opposite. I left before the performance even began, returned home, and stayed up all night creating 'Destruction'. I think I finished at 10 a.m. or so. It was aggressive, a bit scary, and I was sure that no one could feel 'medium' about it."

== Music video ==
The official music video for "Destruction" was released on the band's YouTube channel on January 13, 2016. It was directed by Philip Andelman and produced by Aviv Russ and Joywave. The video follows the band as they hold auditions for a new member, eventually finding an MP3 player as the right choice. They enter recording sessions together and set off on a tour as well, until the MP3 player goes solo, eventually leaving Joywave out of the limelight. Nina Corcoran of Nerdist complimented the video, calling it "clever both in its conception and creation."

== Track listing ==
| No. | Title | Length |
|---|---|---|
| 1. | "Destruction" | 3:04 |

== Charts ==
| Chart (2016) | Peak position |
|---|---|
| Canada Rock (Billboard) | 47 |
| US Alternative Airplay (Billboard) | 18 |
| US Rock & Alternative Airplay (Billboard) | 30 |
