= Swish (album) =

2016 compilation album by Joywave

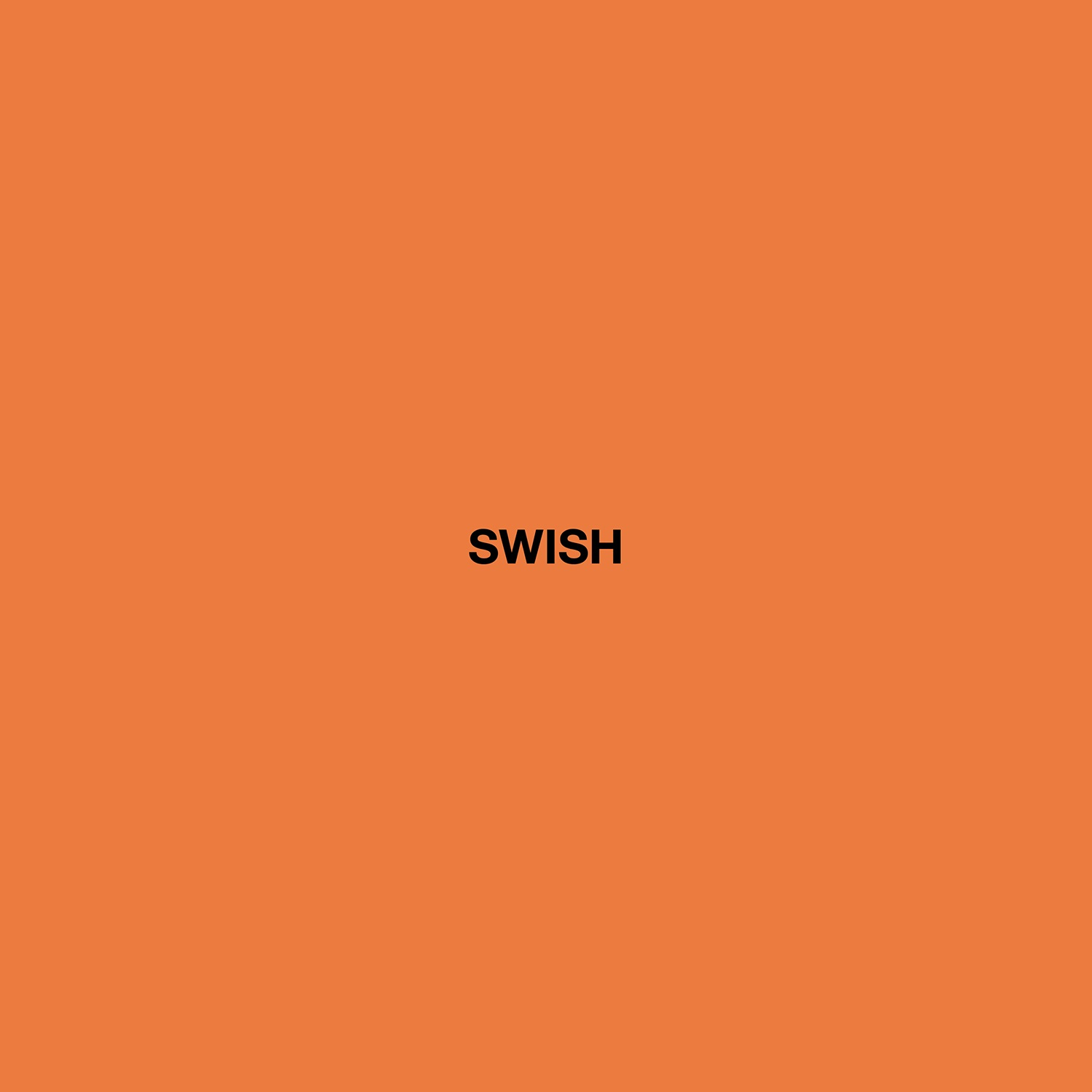

Remix album / compilation album by Joywave
- Released: March 11, 2016
- Length: 30:55
- Labels: Cultco; Hollywood
- Producers: Daniel Armbruster; Sean Donnelly

Joywave chronology
How Do You Feel Now? (2015)	Swish (2016)	Content (2017)

Swish (stylized as SWISH) is a compilation album by American indie rock band Joywave. It was released on March 11, 2016, through Cultco and Hollywood, primarily to promote their single "Destruction". The album contains 10 tracks, beginning with "Destruction", followed by eight versions of the song that feature different remixed intros, and ending with a bonus track titled "Life in a Bubble I Blew", a song that was cut from How Do You Feel Now?. The titles of tracks 2–9 create the phrase "Why be credible when you can be incredible?", a reference to the Huffington Post article that front man Daniel Armbruster wrote about "Destruction".

The name of the album refers to Kanye West's seventh studio album The Life of Pablo, which was originally intended to be titled Swish. This reference was in response to the album artwork of The Life of Pablo bearing a striking resemblance to Joywave's promotional material for "Destruction", which was posted several weeks prior.

== Reception ==
Professional ratings
Review scores
Source	Rating
AllMusic	1.5/5 stars

Marcy Donelson reviewed the album for AllMusic, writing "Call it irritating or call it delightful, the band has also been known to repeat the same song in live performance until they see the desired amount of dancing".

== Track listing ==
All tracks are written by Daniel Armbruster and Sean Donnelly.

No.	Title	Length
1.	"Destruction"	3:04
2.	"Why"	3:15
3.	"Be"	2:59
4.	"Credible"	2:55
5.	"When"	3:03
6.	"You"	3:00
7.	"Can"	2:52
8.	"Be (Part 2)"	3:11
9.	"Incredible?"	2:55
10.	"Life in a Bubble I Blew" (bonus track)	3:41
Total length:		30:55

== Singles ==
Title	Year	Peak chart positions
Title	Year	US Alt.
"Destruction"	2015	18
