= Gospel Claws =

American indie rock band

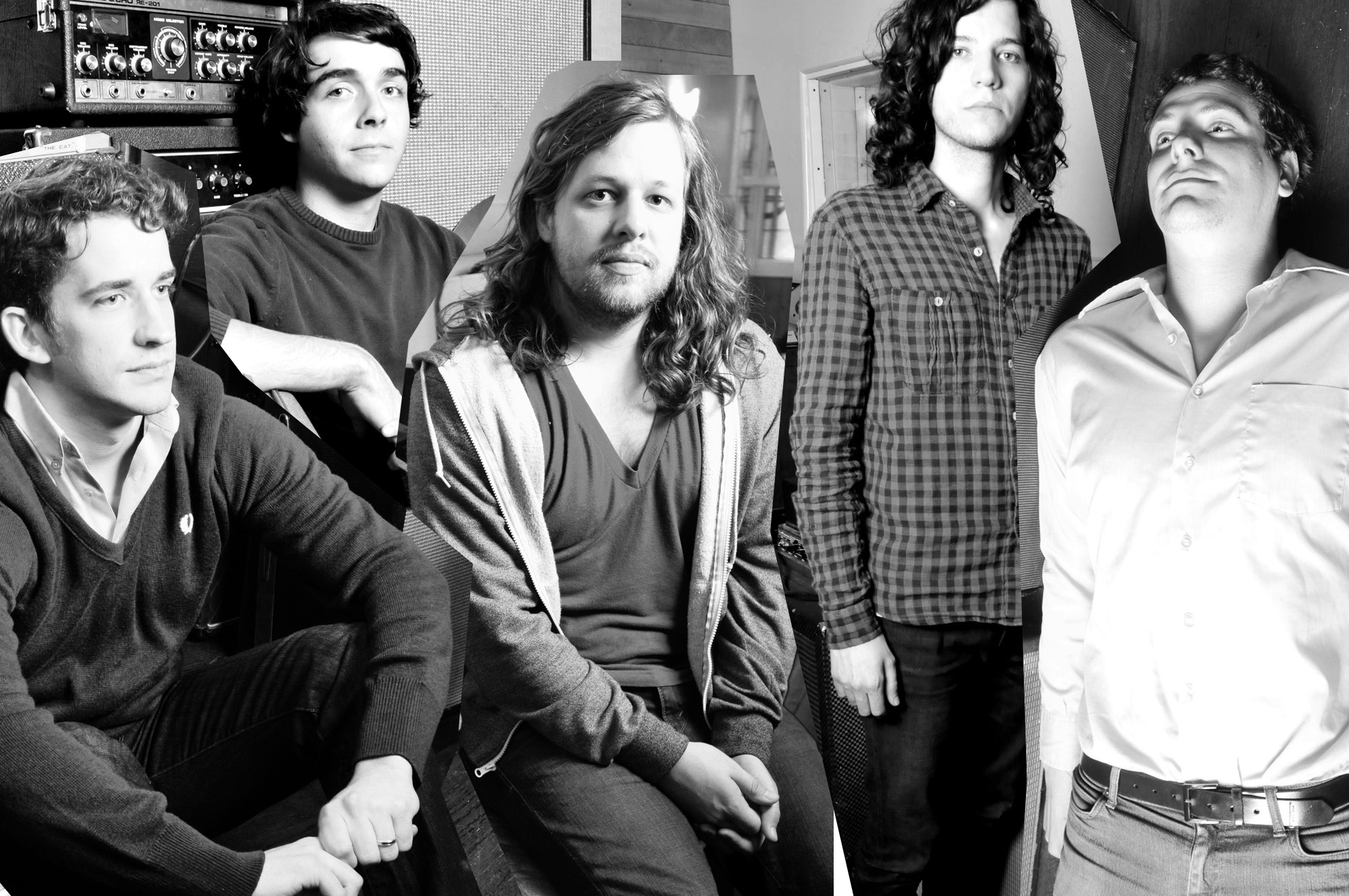

Background information
- Origin: Tempe, Arizona, United States
- Genre: Indie rock
- Years active: 2007 - present
- Labels: Common Wall Media; Modern Art Records
- Members: Joel Marquard Sloan Walters; Scott Hall; John Mulhern; Jef Wright Bob Hoag
- Past members: Haendel Balzora Mark Erickson Wesley Hilsabeck
- Website: www.gospelclaws.com

Gospel Claws is an indie rock band based out of Tempe, Arizona.

== History ==
=== Origins ===
After leaving Dear and the Headlights in 2007, Gospel Claws lead-singer and guitarist Joel Marquard returned to his job as a delivery-man for FedEx. His attachment to music, however, could not keep him out of the scene. That same year, he began collaborating with his friend Sloan Walters, drawing from the catalog of music that he had written over time outside of Dear and the Headlights. These two songwriters eventually recruited John Mulhern and Scott Hall to fill out the rhythm section. Ironically, it was Marquard's day job for FedEx that led him to make the connections necessary to solidify the band's line-up. One day, he found that he had a delivery for Wesley Hilsabeck, a talented guitarist that he had met in the past. Recognizing the name on the package, but not finding him at home, Marquard left a message which eventually led to Hilsabeck joining the band.

The band's choice of name has been a consistent subject of discussion. Although the band bears the name Gospel Claws, and its members originally connected through church experiences, Gospel Claws is not a Christian band. The band has also had to deal with the constant misspelling of its name, as writers and promoters have listed them as Gospel Clause instead of Gospel Claws. The band's first full-length album's name, C-L-A-W-S, stemmed from that issue. Band members have stated that they sometimes regret their original choice of name, and have considered changing it.

=== First EP and C-L-A-W-S ===
Gospel Claws released its first studio recording in 2009. This self-titled EP would create some early buzz for the band. Brandon Nolta at Boise Weekly enjoyed the record's "new-retro vibe" and said that it was "well worth your currency, no matter how inscrutable [the band's] name."

The band would continue to pick up momentum with its first full-length album, C-L-A-W-S, released in October 2010. This album was recorded almost entirely live by Bob Hoag at Flying Blanket Recording, and was very positively received. One critic raved that, "combining indie rock, folk and a bit of soul to produce their own distinctive sound," Gospel Claws' "musical ingenuity separates them from the crowd." Kate Bracaglia at Phrequency.com said the record "is full of the type of slosh-y summer anthems that make you feel alive—from the pounding beat and stylish, [ Clap Your Hands Say Yeah ]-style guitars of opener 'Walk me down' to the sing-song-y, campfire feel of 'Summer nights lakeside.'"

The positive album reviews attracted some significant national attention and translated into some commercial success. C-L-A-W-S spent 5 weeks in the top 100 on CMJ Top 200 and 4 weeks on the FMQB Submodern charts with the album peaking at No. 2 and the single "Walk me Down" at No. 6. After C-L-A-W-S, Paste Magazine named Gospel Claws the top Arizona-band "you should listen to now." This record was also featured on NPR's program All Songs Considered.

Their expanding success allowed Gospel Claws to open for such acts as Wild Nothing, Cotton Jones, No Age, Plants and Animals, and Portugal. The Man. In March 2011, they showcased at SXSW.

=== Put Your Sunshine Away LP ===
For Gospel Claws' second LP, small indie-label Common Wall Media could only agree to provide a little more than half of the record's funding. This meant that the band had to come up with at least $3,000. To reach their goal, the band agreed to use money earned at shows, and to set up a Kickstarter to solicit funds. In the end, the band collected $4,520, or 113% of its original Kickstarter goal, and will use the funds to record their album with Bob Hoag at Flying Blanket Recording.

Their successes, unfortunately, also came with some significant challenges. First, after recording almost half of the album, Wesley Hilsabeck had to leave the band. The band was able to replace him, but they will miss his contributions.

Then, even more serious, lead-singer and guitarist Joel Marquard was diagnosed with testicular cancer. Fortunately, the cancer was caught in its early stages and, after treatment, Marquard has been declared "cancer free." The cancer diagnosis did nothing to slow the band down. They started recording their sophomore album while Marquard was undergoing treatment and it is still due for release in the fall 2012. While the new album's stated influences — '50s doo-wop, Sam Cooke, and the Beach Boys — do not point to an aggressive sound, Marquard has stated that it should not be much mellower than the group's 2010 debut C-L-A-W-S. In jest, the band has also stated that "The running joke at the moment is if Gospel Claws' new record (due out this fall) sounds a little less ballsy than the first, at least there's a valid explanation for it. 'Most bands' sophomore records are kind of mellower than the first, but usually not for medical reasons.'"

Finally, in another tragedy for the band, guitarist Mark Erickson died in August 2012.

== Discography ==
=== Albums ===
Release date	Title	Label	Notes
2008	Self-titled EP	Common Wall Media	
2010	C-L-A-W-S	Common Wall Media; Modern Art Records	
2012	Put Your Sunshine Away	Common Wall Media; President Gator Records	Vinyl LP released in collaboration with President Gator Records

=== Singles ===
- Roman Road (also on split 7-inch with What Laura Says) (Common Wall Media, 2009)
- I Don't Want to Care Anymore (Common Wall Media, 2009)
- I Can. I Will. (Common Wall Media, 2009)
- I Want It All (on a split 7-inch with ROAR) (President Gator Records, 2012)

=== Compilations ===
- Phoenix: We Love It (Stinkweeds, 2009)

Track: "I Don't Want To Care Anymore"

- When In AZ (Independent Compilation, 2009)

Track: "New Modern Girl"

- This Is Flying Blanket, Volume II (Common Wall Media, 2010)

Track: "Walk Me Down"

- The Balls Benefit Compilation (Common Wall Media, 2012)

Track: "Pale Horse Dry Cleaning"

- You Heard Us Back When, Volume 9 (Zia Records, 2015)

Track: "I Can't Wait"
