= Cleanse (album) =

Studio album by Joywave
- Released: February 11, 2022
- Studio: The Joycave (Rochester, New York)
- Genre: Electropop; indietronica
- Length: 35:19
- Label: Cultco; Hollywood
- Producer: Daniel Armbruster

Joywave chronology
| Possession (2020) | Cleanse (2022) | Permanent Pleasure (2024) |

Singles from Cleanse
- 1. "After Coffee" Released: March 19, 2021; 2. "Every Window Is A Mirror" Released: May 7, 2021; 3. "Cyn City 2000" Released: October 29, 2021; 4. "Buy American" Released: January 14, 2022

Cleanse is the fourth studio album by American indie rock band Joywave. It was released February 11, 2022, through Cultco Music and Hollywood Records. Four singles were released prior to the album: "After Coffee", "Every Window Is a Mirror", "Cyn City 2000", and "Buy American". The EP Every Window Is a Mirror was also released prior to the album on June 25, 2021. It contained "After Coffee" and "Every Window Is a Mirror", as well as two new songs: "Pray for the Reboot" and "The Inversion".

== Background and composition ==
Joywave's third studio album, Possession, was released on March 13, 2020, amidst a wave of lockdowns at the beginning of the COVID-19 pandemic. According to frontman Daniel Armbruster, he initially fought the idea of writing any new music during the pandemic, but eventually returned to recording in his home studio. "Reminded of my own mortality by every headline, I began to think about the things I’d want someone to know about me or what advice I’d want to leave behind if this record was the last thing I got to share with the world." Armbruster also said the album was focused on just the ten songs he wrote in response to the pandemic, in contrast to previous albums, which would be compiled from dozens of tracks written over a year or two. Brenner visited Armbruster early in the production to record drums, while Morinelli recorded his guitar parts at home and communicated with the band over Zoom.

The lyrics of most tracks on the album relate to Armbruster's self-reflections during 2020 and a desire for more optimism. The opening track, "Pray for the Reboot", was written in response to polarization on social media, and the track "Inversion" provides further commentary on the relationship between humanity and technology. Other tracks, including "Cyn City 2000" and "We Are All We Need", reject an attitude of cynicism or perceived failure in response to the pandemic and promote gratitude.

The album cover shows a 1980s Ford Crown Victoria in a car wash, inspired by a 1988 Oldsmobile Armbruster had previously owned and a former job he worked at a car wash.

== Promotion and release ==
The single "After Coffee" was released on March 19, 2021. The band released "Every Window is a Mirror" on May 7, and announced they were reuniting in-person to continue working in a press release. On June 25, the Every Window is a Mirror EP was released, containing the previous two tracks and two additional songs, "Pray for the Reboot" and "The Inversion". Armbruster commented that the four tracks were selected for release ahead of the album due to their relevance to current events.

Joywave performed their first live show in support of the Every Window is a Mirror EP on September 3, 2021, at BottleRock Napa Valley.

On October 29, 2021, Joywave released the single "Cyn City 2000". The same day, the band announced the full track listing for Cleanse and the release date of February 11, 2022. Dates for a North American tour were announced, which ran from February 26 to April 8, 2022. In the summer and fall of 2022, Joywave co-headlined "The Welcome to Hellvetica Tour" with I Dont Know How but They Found Me between August 25 and September 25. The band performed a UK and EU tour between November 1 and 14, 2022. Joywave went on a second North American tour, titled the "Express Wash Tour", from March 30 to April 25, 2023.

== Reception ==
Professional ratings
Review scores
| Source | Rating |
|---|---|
| AllMusic | 4/5 stars |
| PopMatters | 9/10 |

Cleanse received positive reception from critics. In a review for AllMusic, Neil Z. Yeung wrote, "The result is a mature and melodic work, one that's both as catchy as anything they've done in the past and softens their typical edge for a more soothing and encouraging experience." Writing for PopMatters, Saby Reyes-Kulkarni called the album "their most moving work yet" and wrote of the album's sound, "Armbruster and company have long been able to dial-up previous pop eras at the touch of a button. With Cleanse, though, they rise above the mechanical mimicry that’s stifled them in the past. This time, Joywave synthesize a slew of dance-pop touchstones—from classic Tears for Fears to LCD Soundsystem and beyond—into a fresh sound that brims with life." Daniel J. Kushner of CITY Magazine also praised the album for its sincerity, writing, "With Cleanse, Joywave has absolved itself of its biggest sin: self-indulgent cleverness. In the past, Armbruster’s addiction to sardonic wit came at the expense of emotional honesty. He and the band might finally be kicking the habit." Kyle Musser of The Alternative praised the album for its themes and concision at 35 minutes long.

== Track listing ==
All tracks are written by Daniel Armbruster

| No. | Title | Length |
|---|---|---|
| 1. | "Pray for the Reboot" | 3:44 |
| 2. | "Buy American" | 3:22 |
| 3. | "Every Window Is a Mirror" | 2:53 |
| 4. | "Cyn City 2000" | 3:11 |
| 5. | "After Coffee" | 3:16 |
| 6. | "We Are All We Need" | 3:29 |
| 7. | "Goodbye Tommy" | 4:00 |
| 8. | "The Inversion" | 3:52 |
| 9. | "Why Would You Want to Be Young Again?" | 3:46 |
| 10. | "Have You Ever Lit a Year on Fire?" | 3:42 |
| Total length: | | 35:19 |

== Personnel ==
Personnel adapted from album liner notes.

Joywave

- Daniel Armbruster – vocals, guitars, programming, keyboards, aux percussion
- Joseph Morinelli – guitars, bass, aux percussion
- Paul Brenner – drums

Additional musicians

- Dan Smith – backing vocals (track 4)
- Charlie Barnes – backing vocals (track 4)
- Jason Milton – backing vocals (track 4)

Technical personnel

- Daniel Armbruster – producer, engineer
- Dan Grech-Marguerat – mixing, programming
- Charles Haydon-Hicks – mixing and programming assistant
- Luke Burgoyne – mixing and programming assistant
- Joe LaPorta – mastering
- Joseph Morinelli – engineer
- Matty Vogel – creative direction, layout, photography
