= Haerts =

German indie pop music duo

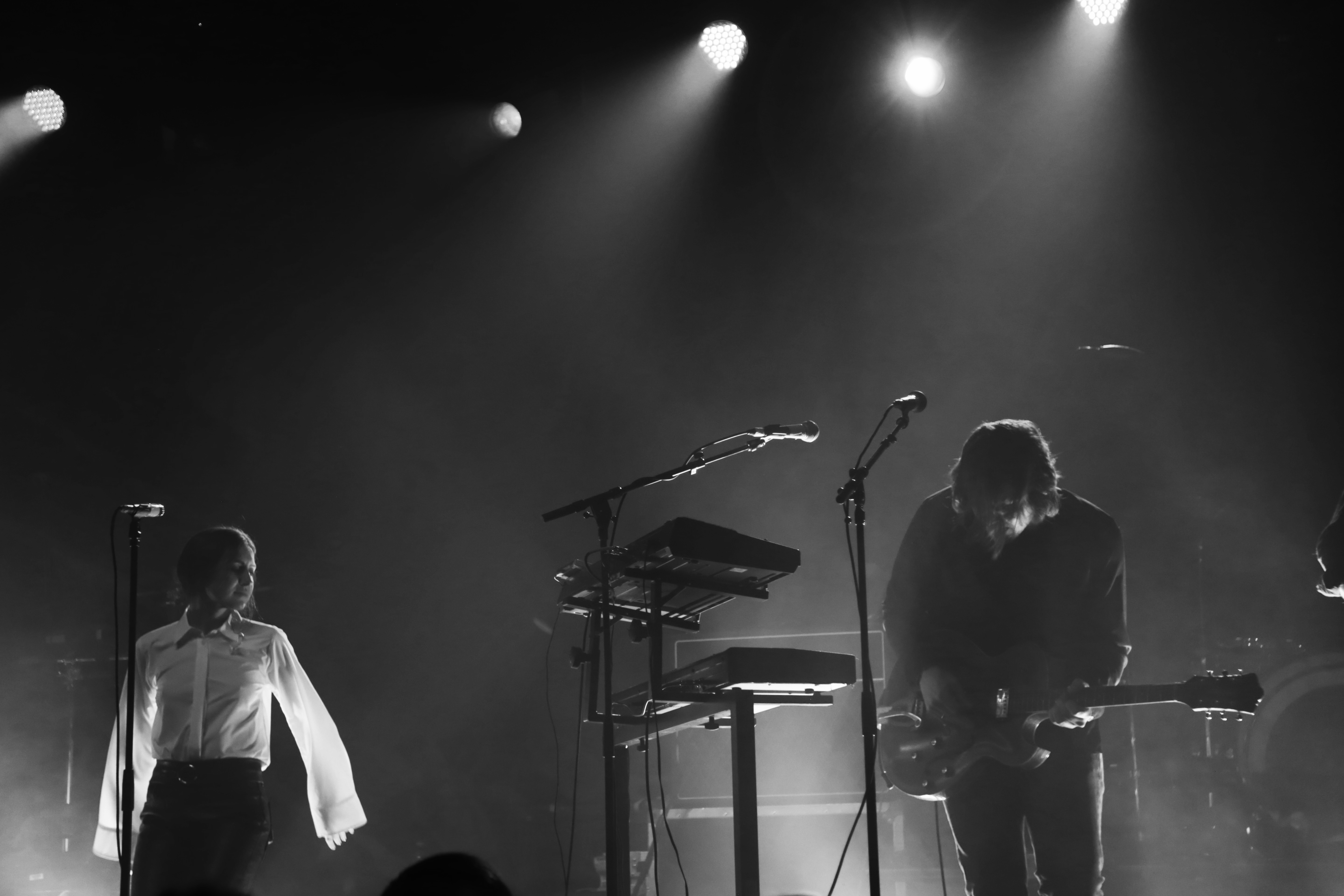

Background information
- Origin: Brooklyn, New York, U.S.
- Genres: Indie pop; alternative
- Years active: 2011–present
- Labels: Columbia
- Members: Nini Fabi; Ben Gebert
- Website: www.haertsmusic.com

Haerts (stylized as HAERTS) is a German indie pop music duo, formed in 2011 in New York. The band consists of Nini Fabi (vocals) and Ben Gebert (keyboards, guitars).

The group made their debut with the single Wings, which was called "about as flawless as pop tunes come" by KEXP. They released their first EP, Hemiplegia in 2013, their self-titled debut album on Columbia Records in 2014, and the visual EP, POWERLAND in 2016.

Since then they have released three further singles and toured with bands such as Rhye, Shout Out Louds, Michelle Branch, Washed Out, and London Grammar. Their music has been featured in film and television, in such films and shows as Carrie, Cake, Love, Simon, Pretty Little Liars and 13 Reasons Why.

== History ==
Haerts was originally formed by singer/songwriter Nini Fabi and pianist/producer Benjamin Gebert. The longtime collaborators grew up in Munich, Germany, and had previously performed as the duo Nini&Ben. They moved to Brooklyn in 2010, where they became Haerts and were joined by band members Garrett Lenner (guitar) and Derek McWilliams (bass). They eventually signed with Columbia Records in 2012.

Haerts' 2012 debut single, "Wings", received regular airplay throughout the United States and was also featured as the song of the day by KEXP-FM. They followed up with the release of their second single, "All the Days", in 2013. The song was voted as the "Song of the Summer" by Elle magazine and featured in the 2013 film Carrie. The group's first EP, Hemiplegia, was released in October 2013. It was produced by St. Lucia and contains both of their original single releases. The band's eponymous debut album was released on October 27, 2014, and it features three of the songs from their first EP. Alongside the debut album's release, two singles have spawned from the album, "Giving Up" and a later release "Be the One".

Garrett Ienner and Derek McWilliams left the band in 2015.

In January 2016, Haerts released the short film POWER/LAND, in collaboration with video artist Julian Klincewicz along with the soundtrack EP POWER/LAND.

In 2017, they released three singles from their second studio album: "Your Love" on March 3, 2017, "No Love for the Wild" on May 19, 2017, and "The Way" on December 8, 2017.

In the fall of 2018, they released their second studio album entitled New Compassion through Arts & Crafts Productions, Inc., and embarked on a tour supported by Vlad Holiday for the east coast and midwest North American dates.

On October 7, 2020, they released their new single "For the Sky" featuring Ed Droste, accompanied by an official music video.

== Discography ==
=== Studio albums ===
Title	Album details
Haerts	Released: October 27, 2014; Label: Columbia; Formats: CD, LP, digital download
New Compassion	Release: October 5, 2018; Release*: September 21, 2018; Label: Arts & Crafts Productions; Formats: digital download, LP*
Dream Nation	Release: May 21, 2021; Label: Antifragile Music; Formats: digital download
Laguna Road	Release: October 3, 2025; Label: Self-released; Formats: digital download

=== Extended plays ===
Title	Album details
Hemiplegia	Released: October 8, 2013; Label: Columbia; Formats: 10", digital download

=== Singles ===
Year	Title	Album
2013	"Wings"	Hemiplegia
2013	"All the Days"	Hemiplegia
2014	"Giving Up"	Haerts
2014	"Be the One"	Haerts
2015	"Everybody Here Wants You"	Non-album single
2016	"Power / Land"	Non-album single
2017	"Your Love"	New Compassion
2017	"No Love for the Wild"	New Compassion
2017	"The Way"	New Compassion
2018	"New Compassion"	New Compassion
2020	"For the Sky (feat. Ed Droste)"	Dream Nation
2020	"It's Too Late"	Dream Nation
2021	"Shivering"	Dream Nation
2021	"Why Only You"	Dream Nation
2021	"Days Go By"	Dream Nation
2025	"Woman on the Line"	Laguna Road
2025	"The Lie"	Laguna Road
2025	"Wait for Us"	Laguna Road
