= Permanent Pleasure =

Studio album by Joywave
- Released: May 17, 2024
- Studios: The Joycave (Rochester, New York); Gavett Audio Studio (Rochester, New York)
- Length: 33:46
- Labels: Cultco; Hollywood
- Producer: Daniel Armbruster

Joywave chronology
Cleanse (2022)	Permanent Pleasure (2024)

Singles from Permanent Pleasure
- 1. "Brain Damage" Released: February 16, 2024; 2. "Scared" Released: March 22, 2024

Permanent Pleasure is the fifth studio album by American indie rock band Joywave. It was released on May 17, 2024, through their own Cultco Music label and Hollywood Records. The album was supported by two singles prior to release, "Brain Damage" and "Scared".

== Background and recording ==
In an interview with Atwood Magazine, frontman Daniel Armbruster said Joywave spent more time working on Permanent Pleasure than any of their previous albums. The opening and closing tracks of the album sample messages by former mayor Thomas P. Ryan Jr. and the song "Rochester is a Grand Old City" from The Rochester Sesquicentennial, a 1984 album commemorating the 150th anniversary of the city's founding. Armbruster decided to use the samples after finding a copy at a local thrift store. Other personnel recordings were provided by the band's former high school band teacher and the Rochester Philharmonic Orchestra.

The album's cover art depicts a cat sleeping in a sunbeam. Vinyl copies of the album also came with a cat figurine to place on the center label while playing the record. According to Armbruster, the cat was used as a symbol of what he aspires to. "I find, you know, we're thinking all the time. And it can be very exhausting. And I'm sitting and scrolling and getting more and more upset. And then I look at this guy right here. And I think, 'how can I be like that?'"

== Promotion and release ==
The album was released on May 17, 2024. A short film for the album was premiered at the Little Theatre in Rochester on the previous day, May 16. The band performed the Permanent Pleasure World Tour from September 11 to November 14, 2024.

== Reception ==
Professional ratings
Review scores
Source	Rating
AllMusic	3.5/5 stars

Neil Z. Yeung reviewed the album for AllMusic, writing that "The world is going to hell, but after wringing their hands for a few albums, Joywave have decided to embrace the chaos and just be in the moment. It's no surprise that this approach -- and really anything they've set their minds to -- works, resulting in yet another thoughtful, engaging, and thoroughly addictive effort to add to their arsenal."

== Track listing ==
All lyrics are written by Daniel Armbruster; all music is composed by Daniel Armbruster, Joseph Morinelli, Paul Brenner)

Standard Edition
No.	Title	Length
1.	"Graffiti Planet"	4:01
2.	"Scared"	2:33
3.	"Brain Damage"	3:13
4.	"He's Back!"	4:04
5.	"Sleepytime Fantasy"	3:38
6.	"Swimming in the Glow"	2:54
7.	"Hate to Be a Bother"	3:29
8.	"787 Dreamliner"	3:03
9.	"Splendor"	2:14
10.	"Here to Perform the Final Song From Their Album 'Permanent Pleasure,' Please Welcome... Joywave"	4:33
Total length:		33:46

Deluxe Edition
No.	Title	Length
11.	"Yellowish Sunbeam"	3:02
12.	"Scared (Acoustic)"	2:52
13.	"Swimming in the Glow (Live)"	3:02
14.	"Scared (Live)"	2:55
15.	"Hate to Be a Bother (Live)"	3:32
16.	"Brain Damage (Live)"	3:14
Total length:		52:23

== Personnel ==
Personnel adapted from album liner notes.

Joywave

- Daniel Armbruster – vocals, keyboards, guitar, flute, programming
- Joseph Morinelli – guitar, bass, backing vocals
- Paul Brenner – drums, aux percussion, omnichord, backing vocals

Additional musicians

- Willa Finck – violin (tracks 1, 3, 5, 9, 10)
- Lars Kirvin – cello (tracks 1, 3, 5, 9, 10)
- Jeff Newberger – viola (tracks 1, 3, 5, 9, 10)
- Jeff Greene – trombone (track 3)
- Herbert Smith – trumpet (tracks 3, 4)
- Al Keltz – pedal steel (track 10)

Technical personnel

- Daniel Armbruster – producer, engineer, string and horn arrangements
- Joseph Morinelli – string and horn arrangements
- Mike Crossey – mixing, programming
- Stephen Sesso – mix assistant
- Joe LaPorta – mastering
- Stephen Roessner – strings and horns engineer
- Alex "Beefus" D'Aurelio – drum tech
- Reuben Dangoor – art and layout
