= How Do You Feel Now? =

Studio album by Joywave
- Released: April 21, 2015
- Recorded: 2013–14
- Studio: Premier Studios, New York, NY; Red Booth Recording, Rochester, NY; The Joycave, Rochester, NY
- Length: 49:03
- Label: Cultco Music; Hollywood
- Producer: Daniel Armbruster; Sean Donnelly

Joywave chronology
How Do You Feel? (2014)	How Do You Feel Now? (2015)	Swish (2016)

Singles from How Do You Feel Now?
- 1. "Tongues" Released: February 9, 2014; 2. "Somebody New" Released: April 28, 2014; 3. "Destruction" Released: March 30, 2015; 4. "Now" Released: July 24, 2015

How Do You Feel Now? is the debut studio album by American indie rock band Joywave, released through Cultco Music and Hollywood Records on April 21, 2015. The album is a follow-up to the band's second extended play, How Do You Feel?, which was released earlier in 2014. It was co-produced by band members Daniel Armbruster and Sean Donnelly and was recorded during 2013 and 2014. Four official singles were released from the album: "Tongues", "Somebody New", "Destruction", and "Now".

== Background and composition ==
Joywave was signed to a record label and composed the album following the break-through success of the single "Dangerous", written by member Daniel Armbruster with Alan Wilkis in the band Big Data. In an interview with RIFF Magazine, Armbruster said the band received two signing offers, one from "a really small Brooklyn indie label" and the other from Disney-owned Hollywood Records. After signing with Hollywood Records, Joywave obtained permission to use samples from the Disney catalog in the album, the first band to do so. Samples from the movies Fantasia, Bambi, and Peter Pan were used in the album.

The Rochester music scene was dominated by metal bands at the time, leaving Joywave in a unique position to pursue whatever sound the members desired. According to Donnelly, "Everyone else in Rochester is very aggressive with the music they make, which has seeped into our music a little bit". The album has an eclectic mix of rock and pop elements, with each track having an underlying dance beat. Armbruster stated the album's overarching theme was figuring out post-college life after the Great Recession.

== Promotion and release ==
The album was released on April 21, 2015. Following the release, Joywave promoted the album with the Joywave World Tour for seven months, concluding with a performance in Rochester on October 10.

== Reception ==
Professional ratings
Review scores
Source	Rating
AllMusic	3.5/5 stars
Rolling Stone Australia	4/5 stars

Critical reception of the album was generally positive, with critics noting the album's genre-mixing. Oliver Pelling of Rolling Stone Australia wrote, "The New York natives have somehow managed to mash multiple sounds and styles into one cohesive, captivating and effortlessly convincing record." Writing for AllMusic, Marcy Donelson described How Do You Feel Now? as a "highly danceable, occasionally ambient album".

The song "Tongues" featuring KOPPS was included in the soundtrack of the EA Sports video game FIFA 15.

"Somebody New" was featured in the Konami video game Pro Evolution Soccer 2016.

== Track listing ==
All tracks are written by Daniel Armbruster and Sean Donnelly

No.	Title	Length
1.	"Somebody New"	3:26
2.	"Carry Me"	4:18
3.	"Tongues" (featuring KOPPS)	3:54
4.	"Destruction"	3:04
5.	"Now"	4:22
6.	"Parade"	3:20
7.	"In Clover"	4:27
8.	"Feels Like a Lie"	4:43
9.	"Traveling at the Speed of Light"	7:33
10.	"Nice House"	5:40
11.	"Bad Dreams"	4:16
Total length:		49:03

== Personnel ==
Personnel adapted from album liner notes.

Joywave

- Daniel Armbruster – vocals, guitar, keyboards, programming
- Sean Donnelly – bass, guitar, keyboards, programming
- Paul Brenner – drums, percussion
- Joseph Morinelli – guitar
- Benjamin Bailey – piano

Additional musicians

- Andrew York – keys
- Erik McOmber – trumpet
- Patricia Petrone – background vocals
- Mikaela Davis – harp

Technical personnel

- Daniel Armbruster – producer and engineer
- Sean Donnelly – producer and engineer
- Brian Moore – additional engineering
- Andros Rodriguez – additional engineering
- Neal H Pogue – mixing tracks 2, 3, 4, 7, 8, 9, and 11
- Randy Warnken – mix assistant tracks 2, 3, 4, 7, 8, 9, and 11
- Andy Wallace – mixing tracks 1, 5, 6, and 10
- Paul Suarez – Pro tools engineering tracks 1, 5, 6, and 10
- Chris Gehringer – mastering
- Joseph Cultice – cover image
- Enny Joo – art direction
- Kyle O'Hara – album layout design

== Charts ==
Chart (2015)	Peak position
US Heatseekers Albums (Billboard)	3
US Top Alternative Albums (Billboard)	25
US Top Rock Albums (Billboard)	34
