= Haerts (album) =

Studio album by Haerts
- Released: October 27, 2014
- Recorded: 2013–14
- Genres: Indie pop; synthpop
- Length: 47:00
- Label: Columbia
- Producers: Haerts; Jean-Philip Grobler; Andy Baldwin

Haerts chronology
Hemiplegia (2013)	Haerts (2014)	New Compassion (2018)

Singles from Haerts
- 1. "Giving Up" Released: September 2, 2014

Professional ratings
Aggregate scores
Source	Rating
Metacritic	56/100
Review scores
Source	Rating
Allmusic	3.5/5 stars
Consequence of Sound	C
Idolator	3.5/5
Paste	7.4/10
Pitchfork Media	5.8/10
Popmatters	3/10
Under the Radar	7/10 stars
Wondering Sound	3/5 stars

Haerts is the debut studio album by American indie pop band Haerts, released on October 27, 2014 by Columbia Records. The album was produced by Haerts and Jean-Philip Grobler (better known as St. Lucia), with additional production from Andy Baldwin. It features three songs that were previously released on the band's debut extended play, Hemiplegia, which was released on October 8, 2013.

== Promotion ==
Haerts embarked on a small promotional tour around North America in mid-2014. They performed already-released music from their first EP Hemiplagia, and unreleased music from their then-upcoming debut album. On September 2, 2014, the band released the first single from their album, "Giving Up", with an accompanying music video on October 30, 2014.

The band embarked on a US tour hitting New York City, Los Angeles, Washington, D.C., Philadelphia, San Francisco, and several other cities, from November 7 to December 20, 2014.

== Track listing ==
No.	Title	Writer(s)	Length
1.	"Heart"	Nini Fabi; Benjamin Gebert	4:29
2.	"Wings"	Fabi; Gebert	4:58
3.	"Hemiplegia"	Fabi; Gebert; Garrett Ienner	3:50
4.	"Call My Name"	Fabi; Gebert	3:36
5.	"No One Needs to Know"	Fabi; Gebert; Ienner	3:34
6.	"Giving Up"	Fabi; Gebert; Jean-Philip Grobler	4:17
7.	"Lights Out"	Fabi	4:23
8.	"Be the One"	Fabi; Gebert	3:38
9.	"All the Days"	Fabi; Gebert; Grobler	4:30
10.	"Hope"	Fabi; Gebert	4:27

iTunes Store bonus tracks
No.	Title	Writer(s)	Length
11.	"The Creek"	Fabi; Gebert; Grobler	4:39
12.	"One Life (ode to Shen)"	Fabi; Gebert; Grobler	3:37

== Charts ==
Chart (2014)	Peak position
US Heatseekers Albums	24
