= Small Steps, Heavy Hooves =

Studio album by Dear and the Headlights
- Released: February 6, 2007
- Genre: Indie rock
- Length: 53:15
- Label: Equal Vision
- Producer: Bob Hoag

Dear and the Headlights chronology
Small Steps, Heavy Hooves (2007)	Drunk Like Bible Times (2008)

Professional ratings
Review scores
Source	Rating
Rebel Punk	link
IGN	8.1/10 link
Music Emissions	4/5 stars

Small Steps, Heavy Hooves is the debut studio album by Dear and the Headlights. The album was released on February 6, 2007 on Equal Vision Records.

== Track listing ==
No.	Title	Length
1.	"Oh No!"	4:14
2.	"Sweet Talk"	2:57
3.	"Hallelujah"	4:09
4.	"Happy in Love"	3:46
5.	"I'm Bored, You're Amorous"	4:00
6.	"Grace"	4:03
7.	"It's Gettin' Easy"	3:33
8.	"Paper Bag"	3:53
9.	"Skinned Knees & Gapped Teeth"	3:36
10.	"Run in the Front"	4:22
11.	"Mother Make Me Golden"	4:12
12.	"I Just Do"	3:43
13.	"Midwestern Dirt"	6:47
Total length:		53:15

=== Bonus track ===
No.	Title	Length
1.	"Telemarket Mishap"	4:31

The bonus track is available with album purchase on iTunes.
