= Now (Joywave song) =

Single by Joywave

from the album How Do You Feel Now? and the EP How Do You Feel?
- Released: July 24, 2015
- Recorded: 2013
- Genre: Indie rock; alternative rock; power pop
- Length: 4:22
- Label: Cultco; Hollywood
- Songwriter(s): Daniel Armbruster; Sean Donnelly
- Producer(s): Daniel Armbruster; Sean Donnelly

Joywave singles chronology
"Destruction" (2015)	"Now" (2015)	"Content" (2017)

"Now" is a song by American indie rock band Joywave. It was released as the fourth single from their debut studio album How Do You Feel Now? on July 24, 2015. It also appears on their second extended play How Do You Feel?. "Now" peaked at number 27 on the Billboard Alternative Songs chart.

== Track listing ==
Digital download
No.	Title	Length
1.	"Now"	4:22

== Charts ==
Chart (2015)	Peak position
US Alternative Airplay (Billboard)	27

== Release history ==
Region	Date	Label	Format
United States	July 24, 2015	Cultco; Hollywood	Digital download
