= Fine China (band) =

American indie rock band

- Origin: Phoenix, Arizona, U.S.
- Genres: Indie rock, indie pop
- Years active: 1997–2006, 2017–present
- Labels: Velvet Blue, Tooth & Nail, Common Wall
- Members: Rob Withem; Greg Markov; Thom Walsh
- Past members: Danny McWatters; 1997–1999; Joshua Block 1998–2004
- Website: finechinatheband.com

Fine China is an American indie rock band from Phoenix, Arizona, comprising Rob Withem (vocals, guitar), Greg Markov (bass guitar) and Thom Walsh (drums).

The band was formed in 1996 as a project by Withem, Danny McWatters and Melissa Banks. Banks shortly stepped down and was replaced by Markov. The band played as a three-piece through the recording of the first EP No One Knows, but soon after recruited Joshua Block (at that time of The Blameshares) to play the keyboards. The band toured as a four-piece, but McWatters left in 1999. The band then recruited Walsh (also of The Blameshares) to be its drummer.

After releasing two EPs on Velvet Blue Music, the band signed to Seattle's Tooth & Nail records and released two LPs, When the World Sings and You Make Me Hate Music.

As a three-piece, the band released Jaws of Life on September 6, 2005 through Common Wall Media. Following a 2006 performance at the New Times Best Of festival, the band decided to go on an indefinite break and became inactive.

In 2017, Fine China got back together to record a new full-length album in Withem's studio. The band returned to Velvet Blue Music with a their fourth album, Not Thrilled. A new 7" single titled You Are Not The Future was also announced.

== Discography ==
=== Albums ===
- When the World Sings (Tooth & Nail Records, 2000)
- You Make Me Hate Music (Tooth & Nail Records, 2002)
- Jaws of Life (Common Wall Media, 2005)
- Not Thrilled (Velvet Blue Music, 2018)
- I Felt Called (Velvet Blue Music, 2025)

=== EPs ===
- No One Knows (Velvet Blue Music, 1997)
- Rialto Bridge (Velvet Blue Music, 1998)
- You Are Not the Future (Velvet Blue Music, 2018)
- Trees At Night (Velvet Blue Music, 2022)

=== Singles (7") ===
- "The Beautiful" (Velvet Blue Music, 1996)
- "Don't Frown" (Velvet Blue Music, 2005)

=== Singles (Digital) ===
- "Every Nerve Alert" (Common Wall Media, 2019)
- "Trees at Night" (Velvet Blue Music, 2020)

=== Compilation contributions ===
- Not One Light Red: A Desert Extended (Sunset Alliance, 2002)

Song: "Give Us Treble"
