= Somebody New (Joywave song) =

Single by Joywave

from the album How Do You Feel Now? and the EP How Do You Feel?
- Released: April 28, 2014
- Recorded: 2013
- Length: 3:26 (album version); 2:57 (radio edit)
- Label: Cultco; Hollywood
- Songwriter(s): Daniel Armbruster; Sean Donnelly
- Producer(s): Daniel Armbruster; Sean Donnelly

Joywave singles chronology
"Tongues" (2014)	"Somebody New" (2014)	"Destruction" (2015)

Music video
- "Somebody New" on YouTube

"Somebody New" is a song by American band Joywave. It is the second single from their debut studio album How Do You Feel Now? and it also appeared on the band's second extended play How Do You Feel?. A music video for the song was uploaded to the band's YouTube Vevo channel on February 24, 2015. The song was performed on Jimmy Kimmel Live!, featured in promotional videos for X Games Austin 2015, and featured on the soundtrack for Pro Evolution Soccer 2016.

== Music video ==
The official music video for the song, lasting three minutes and twenty-seven seconds, was uploaded to the band's Vevo channel on YouTube on February 24, 2015 and was directed by Keith Schofield. The video is mainly centered on skateboarding and also features CGI animation, which is used for scenes involving certain stunts and glitches involving the skateboarders in the video.

== Track listing ==
=== Digital download ===
No.	Title	Length
1.	"Somebody New"	3:26

=== CD-R ===
No.	Title	Length
1.	"Somebody New"	3:26
2.	"Somebody New" (Instrumental)	3:26

== Charts ==
=== Weekly charts ===
Chart (2015)	Peak position
Canada Rock (Billboard)	43
US Hot Rock & Alternative Songs (Billboard)	45
US Alternative Airplay (Billboard)	15
US Rock Airplay (Billboard)	23

=== Year-end charts ===
Chart (2015)	Position
US Alternative Songs (Billboard)	50

== Release history ==
Region	Date	Label	Format
United States	April 28, 2014	Cultco; Hollywood	Digital download
United Kingdom	May 18, 2015	Cultco; Hollywood	CD-R
