= Joywave =

American indie rock band from Rochester, New York

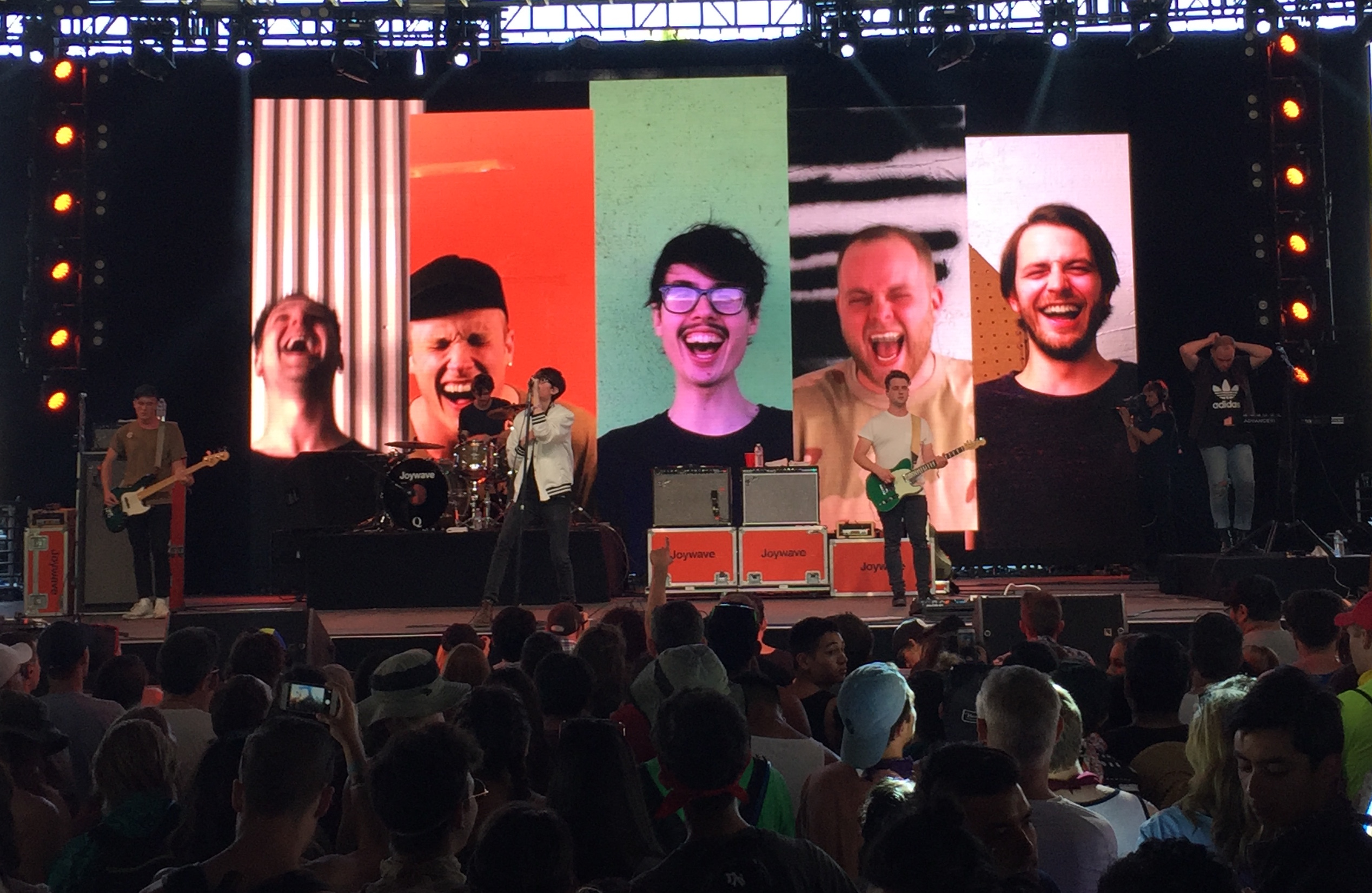
- Joywave performing at the Coachella Valley Music & Arts Festival on April 17, 2016

Background information
- Origin: Rochester, New York, United States
- Genres: Electropop; indie rock; indietronica
- Years active: 2010–present
- Labels: Cultco; Hollywood; Joywave Industries
- Members: Daniel Armbruster; Joseph Morinelli; Paul Brenner
- Past members: Travis Johansen; Sean Donnelly; Benjamin Bailey
- Website: joywavemusic.com

Joywave is an American band from Rochester, New York, formed in 2010. Their lineup consists of Daniel Armbruster (vocals), Joseph Morinelli (guitar), and Paul Brenner (drums). The band first became known for its collaboration with electronic music project Big Data, "Dangerous". After releasing two EPs, their debut album, How Do You Feel Now?, was released through their own Cultco Music label, an imprint of Hollywood Records, in 2015. Their second album, Content, was released on July 28, 2017. It was followed by their third album, Possession, which was released on March 13, 2020. Their fourth album, Cleanse, was released on February 11, 2022. Their fifth album, Permanent Pleasure, was released on May 17, 2024.

== History ==
=== Early years (2010–2013) ===
The members of Joywave all grew up in Rochester, New York. Armbruster, Brenner, and Morinelli played together in various local bands growing up, including The Hoodies. Joywave was officially formed in 2010. Donnelly joined the band soon after, and they released their first mixtape, 77777, in 2011. In 2012, they released their first EP, Koda Vista. In 2013, they released their second mixtape, 88888.

=== "Dangerous" and How Do You Feel Now? (2014–2016) ===
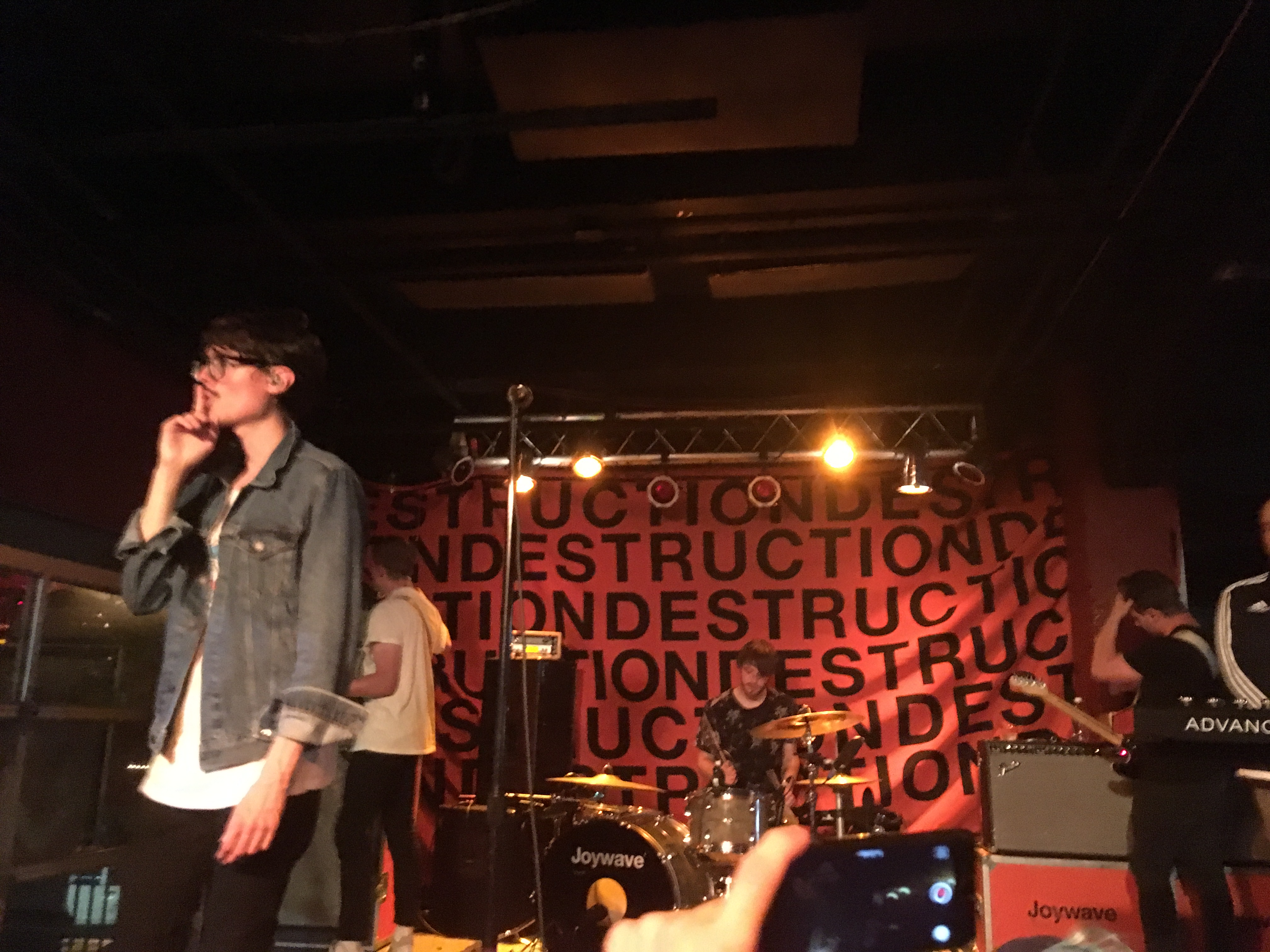
Joywave performing in 2016

In 2012, the band was regularly traveling to perform in New York City, where Armbruster met and collaborated with producer Alan Wilkis on his new project Big Data. Armbruster wrote four songs, including the single "Dangerous", which was recorded by Wilkis with Armbruster on vocals, and credited to Big Data featuring Joywave. The song peaked at number two on the Billboard Rock & Alternative Airplay chart in 2014. Following the viral success of "Dangerous", Joywave performed at Lollapalooza in Chicago and made their television debut in July 2014 on Late Night with Seth Meyers, where they performed the song with Big Data, as well as their own song "Tongues". In 2015, they would also perform on Jimmy Kimmel Live and VH1's Big Morning Buzz Live. The band then signed a contract with the Disney-owned label Hollywood Records to form their own imprint, Cultco, and obtained unique permission to use samples from Disney's movie catalog in their music. The band released their second EP, How Do You Feel?, later in 2014.

Joywave's debut LP, How Do You Feel Now?, was released on April 21, 2015 in the US and June 22, 2015 in the UK. The album was a compilation of tracks composed by the band's members over the preceding decade. It reached #25 on the Billboard Alternative Albums chart, #34 on the Top Rock Albums chart, and #3 on the Heatseekers Albums chart. Four singles were released from the album: "Somebody New", "Tongues", "Destruction", and "Now". A music video for "Tongues" was directed by the duo Daniels. The band toured in support of the album for seven months from April to October, including segments opening shows for The Kooks in North America and for Brandon Flowers of The Killers in the United Kingdom, where they also played Leeds Festival.

In 2016, Joywave released Swish, a novelty record which only featured nine copies of the song "Destruction" and a B-side track titled "Life in a Bubble I Blew". The title is a reference to Kanye West's 2016 album The Life of Pablo, which was originally going to be titled Swish. The band also went on a five-week US tour with Metric.

=== Content (2017–2018) ===
Joywave began recording their next LP in late 2016. Now working with a larger budget, they relocated their home studio in Rochester to a barn in Bloomfield, New York and recorded the album Content over the course of four months. Five singles were released ahead of the album, including the song "Content" in April 2017 and "It's a Trip!" in May. Content was released on July 28, following a launch party held at Rochester's First Federal Plaza. An injury prevented Donnelly from touring for the album, and he departed from the band later in 2017.

In the summer of 2017, they toured across the United States with Young the Giant and Cold War Kids. In November 2017, the band announced the second leg of their Thanks. Thanks for Coming tour, which began in Las Vegas on February 10, 2018. The band appeared on The Late Show with Stephen Colbert on February 9, 2018, where they performed the single "Doubt". They toured with Thirty Seconds to Mars, Walk the Moon, and MisterWives on Thirty Seconds to Mars's North American tour in the summer of 2018, and in September 2018 they toured with Bishop Briggs.

=== Possession (2018–2020) ===
Joywave returned to the extensive use of samples on their third LP, Possession, primarily sourced from the recordings on the Voyager Golden Record. Five of the album's twelve tracks were released ahead of the album, including the singles "Like a Kennedy", released on June 21, 2019, "Obsession", released on August 9, 2019, and "Half Your Age", released on January 7, 2020. Despite the extensive promotion for the album, its release on March 13, 2020 was overshadowed by the COVID-19 pandemic. Joywave performed their last live show of 2020 on March 1 in Berlin, Germany, before returning home to Rochester, where a state of emergency was declared on March 14. The planned Possession Tour was delayed repeatedly and ultimately canceled in 2021.

=== Cleanse (2021–2024) ===
During the period of COVID-related restrictions in 2020 and 2021, Armbruster resumed writing and composition for another album, writing ten tracks of reflections on the pandemic which would form the album Cleanse. Armbruster handled production in his home studio with contributions from Brenner and Morinelli shared over the internet. Keyboardist Benjamin Bailey departed from the band in 2021 to work on solo projects. Joywave released the four-track EP Every Window is a Mirror on June 25, 2021. An additional single, "Cyn City 2000", was released on November 2. Cleanse was released on February 11, 2022.

In October 2021, the band announced The Cleanse Tour, which began in Harrisburg, Pennsylvania on February 26, 2022. Bassist Kevin Mahoney joined as a touring musician, as well as keyboardists Connor Ehman and Jason Milton. In the fall of 2022, Joywave coheadlined The Welcome to Hellvetica Tour with I Dont Know How but They Found Me. In August 2022, Joywave announced a UK and EU tour, which began in Dublin on November 1, 2022. In December 2022, they announced another tour of the United States called Express Wash, which took place in March and April 2023.

In Spring 2022, the band recorded a version of the NHL on ESPN theme for playoff broadcasts.

On June 24, 2022, the band announced a live album titled Live. The album was recorded from multiple shows on the Cleanse Tour and released on July 29, 2022.

The band contributed 3 songs to the soundtrack of the 2023 video game Star Wars Jedi: Survivor, credited as "Yubnib Zekk and the Main Characters".

=== Permanent Pleasure (2024-present) ===
On February 16, 2024, Joywave released the single "Brain Damage". On March 22, 2024, they released the single "Scared", and announced that their upcoming album Permanent Pleasure was scheduled for release on May 17, 2024. In May 2024, the band announced the Permanent Pleasure World Tour, which began on September 11, 2024, in Toronto and concluded on November 14, 2024, in Utrecht. On January 27, 2025, the band announced their Here to Perform... tour, which began on April 16, 2025, in New Haven, Connecticut, running through May, with Little Image as their supporting act.

== Musical styles and influences ==
Joywave's music has been described as electropop, indie rock, and indietronica. Critics have noted influences from pop and synth rock acts of previous decades, including Tears for Fears and LCD Soundsystem. The album Content drew comparisons to the band Hot Chip. According to Donnelly, the Rochester music scene largely consisted of metal bands at the time of Joywave's formation, which influenced their sound to be more aggressive and edgy on How Do You Feel Now?.

Joywave have paid homage to their hometown of Rochester on several projects. Armbruster has said of his hometown pride, "I think it's a shame so many people from here move to another city and never even acknowledge they're from Rochester". Press badges for their 2015 world tour included a copy of the logo for Kodak, where parents of all five band members had worked. Later that year, the band jokingly attempted to crowdfund a purchase of the abandoned local Medley Center Mall. The album Permanent Pleasure samples a message by former mayor Thomas P. Ryan Jr. and the song "Rochester is a Grand Old City" from a 1984 album commemorating the 150th anniversary of the city's founding.

== Related projects ==
After touring with the band Sir Sly in 2018, Armbruster formed the group Best Frenz with Sir Sly musician Jason Suwito. The duo released the EP 30% Off in 2021 and the LP The Mall in 2023.

== Members ==
=== Current ===
- Daniel Armbruster – lead vocals, guitars, production, pianos (2010–present)
- Joseph Morinelli – guitar (2010–present)
- Paul Brenner – drums (2010–present)

=== Touring ===
- Kevin Mahoney – bass guitar (2017–present)
- Connor Ehman - guitar, keyboards, and background vocals (2022)
- Taylor Dubray - guitar, keyboards, and background vocals (2022–present)

=== Former ===
- Travis Johansen – keyboards (2010–2013)
- Sean Donnelly – bass guitar (2010–2017)
- Jeremiah Crespo – bass guitar (2017–2018)
- Benjamin Bailey – keyboards, pianos, synth (2013–2021)

== Discography ==
- How Do You Feel Now? (2015)
- Content (2017)
- Possession (2020)
- Cleanse (2022)
- Permanent Pleasure (2024)
