= Dear and the Headlights =

American indie rock band

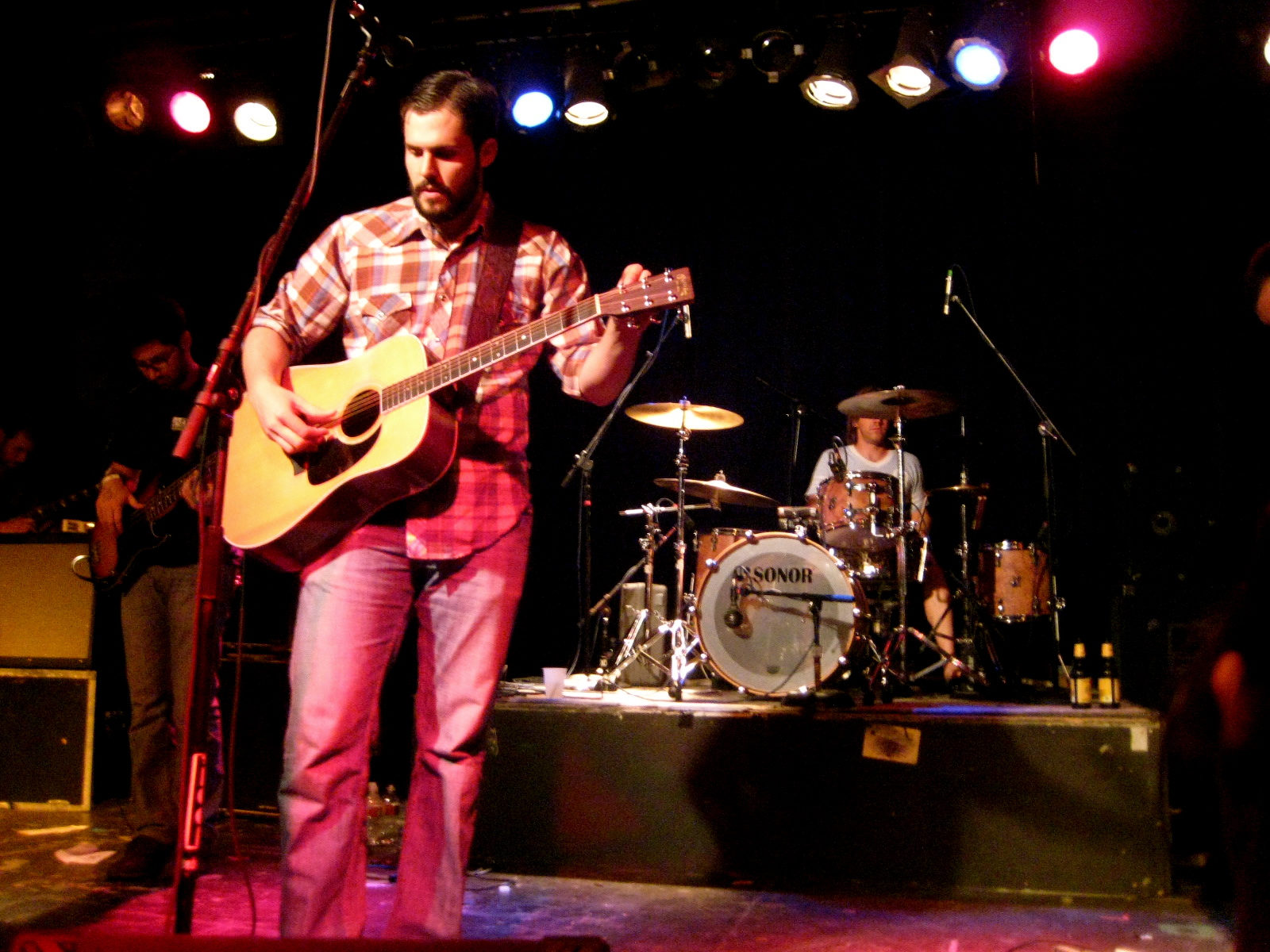
- Dear and the Headlights live in 2009

Background information
- Origin: Phoenix, Arizona, U.S.
- Genre: Indie rock
- Years active: 2005–2011
- Label: Equal Vision
- Past members: Ian Metzger; Robert Cissel; P.J. Waxman; Patrick Taylor; Mark Kulvinskas; Joel Marquard; Chuckie Duff
- Website: www.dearandtheheadlights.com

Dear and the Headlights was an American indie rock band from Phoenix, Arizona, formed in 2005. They released two widely known demos, recorded by future bassist Chuckie Duff, before their debut album was released. These demos included five songs re-recorded for the album. The most notable change to the songs upon re-recording was the drop from standard guitar tuning to E-flat standard tuning. Two songs heard on their purevolume.com page, recorded acoustic on a local radio show, also later appeared on Small Steps, Heavy Hooves. Small Steps, Heavy Hooves, the band's debut album, was released on February 6, 2007 on Equal Vision Records.

On July 20, 2011 the band posted a goodbye message on their site announcing that they had broken up.

== History ==
Joel Marquard (guitarist and keyboardist) and Ian Metzger (lead vocals and acoustic) started playing together in roughly 2005. Marquard convinced Metzger that they needed to start a band, but Ian was reluctant due to a somewhat negative experience with the Christian band called Justifide he co-founded in 1999. He finally gave in and Marquard quickly found PJ Waxman, who initially started out playing drums for the band until they realized what a talented guitar player he was.

PJ is also known for voicing the character of "Plucky", which is Ducky's little sister in the animated film "The Land Before Time", though it didn't make it into the film officially. Despite the film's success, PJ felt his calling was in music. Once PJ took the role of guitarist, DATH were still left without a drummer and bass player. They tried out several people but nothing worked. Joel received a phone call from an old friend and former bandmate named Chuckie Duff who played bass and had recently bought some recording equipment that he wanted to try out. So that next day he came over and recorded three songs (Sweet Talk, Daysleeper, Run in the Front.) The songs were successful but Ian was burnt out on trying to find people for the band, and determined to move to California. Duff kept listening to the demo and fell more and more in love. He was determined to not let them give up. He called Marquard and offered to play bass and promised him they'd find a drummer. Ian decided to give it a shot. Duff was right and Marquard found drummer Mark Kulvinskas through an ad on Craigslist.

So Joel, PJ, Duff and Mark practiced the songs with Ian still in California, and got them down. Chuckie booked a show at Borders Bookstores and flew Ian down. He met the drummer, they practiced with Ian and played that night. Several more shows were played like this and Ian decided to move back. The decision was made to make an album famed Arizona record producer, songwriter of The Go Reflex and former keyboardist of The Ataris, Bob Hoag.

Near the album's completion, the band started talking to, and eventually signing a contract with the popular indie label, Equal Vision Records. Small Steps, Heavy Hooves was critically acclaimed, and the band grew to a much higher status through endless touring with major label bands such as Jimmy Eat World, Paramore, The Plain White T's, Steel Train, and Motion City Soundtrack. Marquard left the band in September 2007 due to the heavy touring schedule and Robert Cissell was an obvious choice to replace him. They completed several more laps around the country and recorded Drunk Like Bible Times in early 2008. In September 2009, bassist Chuck Duffie left the group in order to "focus on graduate school and his studio."

He was replaced by Patrick Taylor in January 2010. In mid July 2011, PJ announced that the band had broken up because of having a rough time with the music industry and felt they got all that they had wanted through the band. He then said that the band had drifted from what they originally began making music for. PJ also stated that they appreciate everything that they experienced and enjoyed doing what they were doing.

In a 2016 interview with Adam Vitcavage's podcast Internal Review, frontman Ian Metzger revealed the band had about 10 songs ready to go for a third album, but the band broke up during this process. It was due to Waxman wanting to pursue solo projects and Metzger feeling burnt out carrying the majority of songwriting duties. Metzger went on to work on a new project called The Gentle Hits with a self-titled album that released on November 18, 2016.

== Touring ==
In early 2007, around the time Small Steps, Heavy Hooves was released, Dear and the Headlights toured on an opening slot with The Plain White T's, Boys Night Out and Lovedrug. The band also toured with As Tall As Lions and headliners Mae in the summer of 2007. Following this they toured with Dredg and As Cities Burn, and following this with Fear Before the March of Flames and Circa Survive.

The band also played the 11:15 slot at the Chicago, IL music festival, Lollapalooza, on August 4, 2007.

In earlier 2008, they toured the U.S. with Straylight Run and had a headlining tour along with Cassino and The Color Fred.

In spring 2008, they opened for Jimmy Eat World and Paramore on their co-headlining tour.

They toured in support of Motion City Soundtrack and separately with Steel Train in fall of 2008.

They headlined a tour in early 2009 with Miniature Tigers and Reubens Accomplice supporting.

They performed at Coachella 2009 on April 17, 2009.

They played on the 2009 Warped Tour on the Smartpunk.com Stage.

== Members ==
Former

- Ian Metzger – vocals, guitar
- P.J. Waxman – guitar, backing vocals
- Patrick Taylor – bass
- Robert Cissell – guitar, keys, bass
- Mark Kulvinskas – drums
- Joel Marquard – guitar, keys
- Chuckie Duff – bass

Touring members

- Rajiv Patel – bass
- Alex Gerber – bass
- Jordan Crittenden – bass

== Discography ==
- Small Steps, Heavy Hooves (2007)
- Drunk Like Bible Times (2008)
