= Dangerous (Big Data song) =

Single by Big Data featuring Joywave

from the album 1.0 and 2.0
- B-side: "Oliver Remix"
- Released: October 1, 2013
- Recorded: 2013
- Genre: Indie rock; alternative rock
- Length: 4:40
- Label: Wilcassettes; Crush Music; Warner Bros.
- Songwriters: Daniel Armbruster; Alan Wilkis
- Producer: Alan Wilkis

Big Data singles chronology
"Dangerous" (2013)	"The Business of Emotion" (2014)

Joywave singles chronology
"Traveling at the Speed of Light" (2011)	"Dangerous" (2013)	"Tongues" (2014)

Alternate cover
- Record Store Day 2015 7" cover

"Dangerous" is the debut single by American electronic music project Big Data, from their debut EP 1.0 (2013) and their debut studio album 2.0 (2015). It features American indie rock band Joywave, with vocals by the band's lead singer Daniel Armbruster.

== Release ==
"Dangerous" was first released as a digital single by Big Data member Alan Wilkis' label Wilcassettes LLC on October 1, 2013. An EP entitled 1.5, consisting of eight remixes of "Dangerous", was released on December 3, 2013. The single was subsequently re-released on June 3, 2014. In April 2016, the Austrian rapper Left Boy used a sample of the song in his song of the same title; "Dangerous". It was featured in the film Earth to Echo.

== Music video ==
The music video for "Dangerous" was released on February 19, 2014 and directed by Brandon LaGanke and John Carlucci of GHOST+COW, based on a concept developed with Alan Wilkis. It revolves around two shoe designers who develop an athletic shoe that encourages the wearer to commit acts of violence. The two designers first observe a group of shackled inmates wearing the shoes and walking in circles until one wearer bumps into another, resulting in one inmate violently headbutting another, to the point that blood splatters onto the testers. Satisfied with the results, a marketing meeting is held to develop advertising for the shoe.

The rest of the video alternates between the pitching of advertising ideas and the concepts being shown in real time. The advertisement within the video opens with a woman (Lauren Francesca) in a two-piece running outfit jogging down a street, who is later joined by a second woman (Nicola Fiore) also jogging and similarly dressed. The camera frequently pans from the shoes to their breasts and faces, and closed captioning reading "sexual breathing". Seeing the chief marketing director's bored reaction, the designers begin to incorporate more graphic ideas into the advertisement, including the joggers headbutting various bystanders to death and engaging in a lesbian kiss, to the approval of the director and his executives, who toast champagne to celebrate their success.

=== Big Kitty version ===
On December 31, 2014 private messaging app Wickr sponsored a version of the music video, titled "Big Kitty", promoting its recent Facebook photo development to keep pictures private by using pictures of cats instead.

== Charts ==
=== Weekly charts ===
Chart (2014)	Peak position
Canada Hot 100 (Billboard)	75
Canada Rock (Billboard)	4
US Bubbling Under Hot 100 (Billboard)	6
US Adult Pop Airplay (Billboard)	22
US Hot Rock & Alternative Songs (Billboard)	8
US Rock & Alternative Airplay (Billboard)	2

=== Year-end charts ===
Chart (2014)	Position
US Hot Rock Songs (Billboard)	26
US Rock Airplay (Billboard)	10

Chart (2015)	Position
US Rock Airplay (Billboard)	22

== Certifications ==
Region	Certification	Certified units/sales
Canada (Music Canada)	Gold	40,000^{*}
United States (RIAA)	Platinum	1,000,000^{‡}
^{*} Sales figures based on certification alone.^{‡} Sales+streaming figures based on certification alone.

== Release history ==
Country	Date	Format	Label
United States	October 1, 2013	Digital download	Wilcassettes
United States	June 3, 2014	Digital download (re-release)	Wilcassettes
United States	September 16, 2014	Contemporary hit radio	Wilcassettes, Crush Music, Warner Bros.
United States	April 18, 2015	Record Store Day 7"	Wilcassettes, Crush Music, Warner Bros.
