= Big Data (music project) =

American electronic music project

- Origin: Brooklyn, New York, United States
- Genres: Electropop; glitch pop; alternative dance; indietronica; indie rock
- Years active: 2012–present
- Labels: Wilcassettes; Crush Music; Warner Bros.; AWAL
- Members: Alan Wilkis
- Past members: Daniel Armbruster
- Website: bigdata.fm

Big Data is an American electronic music project created by producer Alan Wilkis. Big Data is best known for the single "Dangerous", featuring Joywave, which reached number one on the Billboard Alternative Songs chart in August 2014, and was certified gold by the RIAA in May 2015.

Wilkis began recording for Big Data in the summer of 2012. The name of the project was a reference to big data collection on the internet by sites such as Facebook. Most of his songs were thematically related to digital technology. Wilkis initially collaborated with Daniel Armbruster of Joywave while the latter was traveling from Rochester to New York City for tours, with Wilkis composing the music and Armbruster writing lyrics. After changes to Joywave's touring schedule, Armbruster parted and Big Data became a solo project. AllMusic lists Orchestral Manoeuvres in the Dark, Ladytron, The Postal Service, LCD Soundsystem and Phoenix as influences.

Big Data's first EP, 1.0, was released on October 1, 2013, on Wilkis's own Wilcassettes label and features the songs "The Stroke of Return", "Dangerous", "Big Dater", and "Bombs over Brooklyn". The song "Dangerous" went viral with an interactive music video titled "Facehawk", which would convert the timeline of Facebook users into an image of a hawk to portray how much of their personal information had been uploaded to the site. In early December 2013, they also released a remix EP, 1.5, which included eight remixes of the song "Dangerous", including one by Joywave. Another remix EP, 1.6, was released in late September 2014, and included seven remixes of "Dangerous".

Big Data's first studio album, 2.0, was released on March 20, 2015. The album featured collaborations with several vocalists, including Rivers Cuomo on the track "Snowed In". A second album, 3.0, was released on July 26, 2019. On August 10, 2026, Big Data released a video on social media announcing the upcoming 4.0 album.

== Discography ==
=== Studio albums ===
List of studio albums
Title	Album details	Peak chart positions
Title	Album details	US
2.0	Released: March 20, 2015; Label: Wilcassettes, Warner Bros.; Formats: CD, 12", digital download	75
3.0	Released: July 26, 2019; Label: Wilcassettes, AWAL	

=== Singles ===
==== As lead artist ====
List of singles, with selected chart positions
Title	Year	Peak chart positions				Certifications	Album
Title	Year	US	US Alt.	US Rock	CAN	Certifications	Album
"Dangerous" (featuring Joywave)	2013	106	1	8	75	MC: Gold; RIAA: Platinum	2.0
"The Business of Emotion" (featuring White Sea)	2014	—	33	—	—		2.0
"—" denotes a recording that did not chart or was not released in that territory.

==== Promotional singles ====
List of promotional singles
Title	Year	Album
"Snowed In" (featuring Rivers Cuomo)	2015	2.0
"Clean" (featuring Jamie Lidell)	2015	2.0
"Get Some Freedom" (featuring Dragonette)	2015	2.0
"See Through" (featuring L1ZY)	2018	3.0
"Evolution Once Again"	2018	3.0
"Monster" (featuring Jamie Lidell)	2018	3.0
"Rabbit Hole" (featuring Miette Hope)	2026	4.0

=== Extended plays ===
List of extended plays, with selected chart positions
Title	Details	Peak chart positions
Title	Details	US Heat
1.0	Released: October 1, 2013; Label: Wilcassettes; Formats: Digital download	50
1.5	Released: December 3, 2013; Label: Wilcassettes; Formats: Digital download	—
1.6	Released: September 30, 2014; Label: Wilcassettes; Formats: Digital download	—
"—" denotes a recording that did not chart or was not released in that territory.
