= Antonoff =

Antonoff is a surname. Notable people with the surname include:

- Jack Antonoff (born 1984), American singer, songwriter, and record producer, brother of Rachel
- Rachel Antonoff (born 1981), American fashion designer
