= Trampoline (Steel Train album) =

Studio album by Steel Train
- Released: October 16, 2007
- Genre: Folk rock
- Length: 52:42
- Label: Drive-Thru
- Producer: Mark Trombino

Steel Train chronology
Twilight Tales from the Prairies of the Sun (2005)	Trampoline (2007)	Steel Train (2010)

Professional ratings
Review scores
Source	Rating
AllMusic	3.5/5 stars
Alternative Press	3.5/5 stars
Entertainment Weekly	Favorable
Forest Lake Times	Favorable
Ink 19	Favorable

Trampoline is the second studio album released by Steel Train.

== Release ==
Between July and September 2007, the band supported the Format on their headlining US tour. "Firecracker" and "Alone on the Sea" were posted on the band's Myspace page on October 8, 2007. Trampoline was released on October 16, 2007. In January and February 2008, the band went on a headlining east coast tour, with Person L, Paper Rival and American Babies. During each date of the tour, the band performed Trampoline in its entirety, with an encore of older material. In March And April, the band supported The Starting Line on their headlining US tour. Also in April, the band appeared at the Bamboozle Left festival. From late May to early July, the band went on tour with the Spill Canvas, Ludo, Sing It Loud and Liam and Me. In October and November, the band went on a headlining tour of the US with support from Forgive Durden and Dear and the Headlights. They ended the year a holiday show with Envy on the Coast and the Gay Blades.

== Track listing ==
All songs written by Jack Antonoff.

1. "I Feel Weird" – 3:02
2. "Black Eye" – 4:22
3. "Kill Monsters in the Rain" – 3:58
4. "Dakota" – 3:55
5. "Alone on the Sea" – 7:08
6. "Firecracker" – 3:27
7. "A Magazine" – 5:12
8. "Diamonds in the Sky" – 4:06
9. "Leave You Traveling" – 3:47
10. "I've Let You Go" – 3:47
11. "School Is for Losers" – 3:43
12. "Women I Belong To" – 6:20 (includes hidden track "Say No to the Devil")

== Personnel ==
=== Steel Train ===
- Jack Antonoff – vocals, guitar, piano
- Scott Irby-Ranniar – vocals, percussion
- Evan Winiker – bass, backing vocals
- Daniel Silbert – guitar, backing vocals
- Jon Shiffman – drums, percussion

=== Additional musicians ===
- Nate Ruess - backing vocals on "Kill Monsters in the Rain" and "Dakota"
- Rachel Antonoff - backing vocals on "Dakota"
