= Steel Train (album) =

Studio album by Steel Train
- Released: June 29, 2010
- Genre: Indie rock
- Length: 41:21

Steel Train chronology
| Trampoline (2007) | Steel Train (2010) |

Terrible Thrills Vol. 1
- Album art

Professional ratings
Review scores
| Source | Rating |
|---|---|
| Absolutepunk | 87% |
| The Album Project | 4/5 stars |
| Blare Magazine | 3.5/5 stars |
| Sputnikmusic | 4/5 stars |

Steel Train is the third and final studio album by Steel Train, released on June 29, 2010. The album features an all-female companion album entitled Terrible Thrills Vol. 1, which consists of covers, remixes, and re-imaginings of every song on the album by female artists. On June 20, the band began streaming Steel Train on their website in anticipation of their tour supporting the album. The band performed the 'first chord' of the album on the Conan webisode, Show Zero. "Bullet" impacted radio on February 15, 2011.

== Track listing ==
All songs written by Jack Antonoff.

1. "Bullet" – 4:08
2. "Turnpike Ghost" – 2:42
3. "You and I Undercover" – 4:12
4. "You Are Dangerous" – 2:56
5. "S.O.G. Burning in Hell" – 3:55
6. "Touch Me Bad" – 3:37
7. "Behavior" – 4:03
8. "Children of the 90s (I'm Not the Same)" – 3:04
9. "Soldier in the Army" – 3:24
10. "Bloody Lips" – 2:44
11. "The Speedway Motor Racers Club" – 3:22
12. "Fall Asleep" – 3:09

== Terrible Thrills, Vol. 1 ==
The companion album Terrible Thrills, Vol. 1 features each track on Steel Train reinterpreted by female artists.

1. "Bullet" by Scarlett Johansson
2. "Turnpike Ghost" by Tegan and Sara
3. "You and I Undercover" by Holly Miranda
4. "You Are Dangerous" by Angel Deradoorian
5. "S.O.G. Burning in Hell" by Alia Shawkat
6. "Touch Me Bad" by Nellie McKay
7. "Behavior" by Amanda Palmer
8. "Children of the 90s (I'm Not the Same)" by Greta Morgan
9. "Soldier in the Army" by Rachael Cantu
10. "Bloody Lips" by Charlotte Caffey and Astrid McDonald
11. "The Speedway Motor Racers Club" by Anna Waronker
12. "Fall Asleep" by Rachel Antonoff

Antonoff's next band, Bleachers, released volume 2 of Terrible Thrills in coordination with their album Strange Desire, and volume 3 with Gone Now.
