= Mr. Perfectly Fine =

2021 song by Taylor Swift

Promotional single by Taylor Swift

from the album Fearless (Taylor's Version)
- Written: 2008
- Released: April 7, 2021
- Studio: Conway Recording (Los Angeles); Electric Lady (New York); Rough Customer (New York)
- Genre: Pop rock; country pop
- Length: 4:37
- Label: Republic
- Songwriter: Taylor Swift
- Producers: Taylor Swift; Jack Antonoff

Lyric video
- "Mr. Perfectly Fine" on YouTube

"Mr. Perfectly Fine" (Note: Subtitled as "(From the Vault)".) is a song by the American singer-songwriter Taylor Swift from her first re-recorded album, Fearless (Taylor's Version) (2021). It is one of the album's "From the Vault" tracks that was intended for but excluded from her second studio album, Fearless (2008). The song was released for limited-time download via Swift's website on April 7, 2021. She wrote "Mr. Perfectly Fine" in 2008, a track that incorporates wordplay and sees the narrator's heartbreak and fallout with a lover she presumed was the ideal figure for her.

Produced by Swift and Jack Antonoff, "Mr. Perfectly Fine" has an upbeat and midtempo production and acoustic instrumental. Critics described its genre as pop rock and country pop. They gave the song generally positive reviews, deeming it a classic from Swift and an example of her growth as a musician. It has been highly ranked among her "From the Vault" tracks. Commercially, "Mr. Perfectly Fine" peaked at number 30 on the US Billboard Hot 100 and number 19 on the Billboard Global 200. It reached the top 50 in several countries and received certifications in Australia, Brazil, and the United Kingdom. Swift performed the song during the Pittsburgh and Toronto concerts of her Eras Tour (2023–2024).

== Background and release ==
After signing a new contract with Republic Records, Taylor Swift began re-recording her first six studio albums in November 2020. The decision followed a public dispute in 2019 between Swift and the talent manager Scooter Braun, who acquired Big Machine Records, including the masters of her albums which the label had released. By re-recording the albums, Swift had full ownership of the new masters, which enabled her to control the licensing of her songs for commercial use and therefore substituted the Big Machine–owned masters.

On February 11, 2021, Swift announced the first of her re-recorded albums, Fearless (Taylor's Version), a re-recording of her second studio album Fearless (2008). In addition to re-recordings of the original album's tracks, Fearless (Taylor's Version) contained six previously unreleased "From the Vault" tracks, which are songs written for the original album that did not make the cut. Swift explained that these songs were left out of Fearless for various reasons and that including them on the re-recorded album proved that "the artist is the only one who really knows that body of work". One such song was "Mr. Perfectly Fine", which Swift wrote in 2008, but she ultimately excluded it from the final track-list.

On April 4, 2021, "Mr. Perfectly Fine" was confirmed to be one of the "From the Vault" tracks after Swift teased it in a clip containing the title in scrambled anagram the day before. The song was released for download via Swift's website on April 7. It was the third song issued preceding the release of Fearless (Taylor's Version), following "Love Story (Taylor's Version)" and "You All Over Me". The song is listed as track number 22 on the album, which came out on April 9, 2021. In the following weeks, "Mr. Perfectly Fine" was featured on the Fearless (Taylor's Version)-themed streaming compilations The Halfway Out the Door Chapter and The From the Vault Chapter. On June 16, 2023, Swift performed the track at a Pittsburgh show as part of her Eras Tour (2023–2024). She sang it again as part of a mashup with "Red" in Milan on July 14, 2024 and "Better than Revenge" (2010) at a Toronto show of the tour on November 21.

== Composition and lyrics ==
"Mr. Perfectly Fine"
An acoustic pop rock and country pop song, "Mr. Perfectly Fine" features wordplay that differentiates the narrator's turbulent emotions from her ex-lover's indifference.

"Mr. Perfectly Fine" is 4 minutes and 37 seconds long. Swift produced the song with Jack Antonoff, who recorded it with Laura Sisk at Conway Recording Studios in Los Angeles, Electric Lady Studios in New York City, and Rough Customer Studio in Brooklyn. Christopher Rowe recorded Swift's vocals at Kitty Committee Studio in London and Antonoff provided programming and background vocals. Antonoff played acoustic, bass, and electric guitars, keyboards, modular synthesizers, and percussion, Evan Smith played saxophones and synthesizers, Michael Riddleberger played percussion, Mikey Freedom Hart played 12-string, electric, and pedal steel guitars, and Hammond B-3, and Sean Hutchinson played drums. The song was mixed by Serban Ghenea at MixStar Studios in Virginia Beach and mastered by Randy Merrill at Sterling Sound in Edgewater.

"Mr. Perfectly Fine" has an upbeat and midtempo production with an acoustic instrumental. NME, Spin, and The Telegraph categorized the song as a pop rock tune, while American Songwriter and The New Yorker wrote that it featured a "pop-country" production. Other publications believed that the song was pop. (Note: Attributed to Billboard, Clash, The Sydney Morning Herald, and Vulture) Several critics commented that it combined or evoked styles of country, pop, and rock. In Rolling Stone, Claire Shaffer wrote that the track mixed country and pop with elements of rock. The Line of Best Fit's Horton Ross said that it featured a little bit of both country and rock and roll. Lipshutz stated that the song had similarities with Fearless and Speak Now (2010), highlighting the country pop-styled drums. For The Independent, Alexandra Pollard thought it evoked "late-Noughties country-pop". Jordan Moreau from Variety said the song recalled the country pop aesthetic of Fearless.

In the lyrics, a narrator experiences heartbreak after a fallout with a lover she thought was the ideal figure for her. The song uses wordplay with the ex-lover addressed as "mister" while the narrator is labeled as "miss". The first verse recounts the ex-lover's seemingly perfect personality: "Mr. perfect face. Mr. here to stay. Mr. look me in the eye and told me you would never go away". The wordplay is also utilized to describe the contrasting emotions between the two characters. In the chorus, the narrator recalls the tumultuous feelings the former lover gave her ("I've been Miss Misery since your goodbye") and displays him as indifferent to the situation ("And you're Mr. 'Perfectly fine"). Later in the song, she discovers that he has a new lover and tries to ignore it, but she ultimately says that he will miss her and be too late when he realizes. The lyrics also included the line "casually cruel", which many critics noted to be the second time Swift has used it, after the song "All Too Well" (2012). (Note: Attributed to Madeline Crone of American Songwriter, Jess Cohen of E! Online, Hannah Mylrea of NME, Chris Deville of Stereogum, Bobby Olivier of Spin, P. Claire Dodson of Teen Vogue, Annabel Gutterman of Time, and Erin Browne and Zoe Haylock of Vulture)

== Critical reception ==
Many critics considered "Mr. Perfectly Fine" a classic track from Swift and attributed it to the songwriting and production. (Note: Attributed to Crone, Gil Kaufman of Billboard, Kitty Empire of The Guardian, Ross Horton of The Line of Best Fit, Carrie Battan of The New Yorker, Claire Shaffer of Rolling Stone, Giselle Au Nhien-Nguyen of The Sydney Morning Herald, and Justin Curto of Vulture) A few thought that the song revived the scornful side of Swift. (Note: Attributed to Alexandra Pollard of The Independent, Katie Moulton of Consequence, and Jackson Langford of MTV) Zoe Haylock of Vulture wrote that it was "a 2008 time capsule". Curto said that the song is one of the more "cheekier takes" of Swift's breakup tracks and believed that the "lyrical formula that could be cheesy in someone else's hands" created its well-made catchiness. Lipshutz wrote that the track "[pays] homage to some of Swift's grandest breakup songs". In less enthusiastic reviews, The Telegraph's journalist Neil McCormick felt that it was a bit "too aggressive for [Swift's] teenage image", and Jonathan Keefe of Slant Magazine thought the song's use of the "casually cruel" line was inferior compared to how it was utilized on "All Too Well".

Some critics deemed "Mr. Perfectly Fine" reminiscent of the original Fearless but with Swift's growth as a musician. Harbon stated that it was "a perfect collaboration between her old and new self" that blends her early songwriting with the more complex compositions from her indie works. Crone thought the song "reflects [Swift's] roots" with an evolved musicianship. Kitty Empire of The Guardian believed that it had the "brighter, more direct songcraft" of Fearless that complements the "watercolor production" of her album Folklore (2020). Also from The Guardian, Alexis Petridis thought the song took "new resonances" and highlighted the "relish" in Swift's voice expressed a satisfaction that mitigates her anger.

Other reviewers only focused on the track's content. Hannah Mylrea of NME deemed it a "bop" laden with "swooning melodies and typically Swiftian lyrics". Bobby Olivier from Spin wrote that the song is "deviously addictive" and believed that the music evoked "the best of Kelly Clarkson and Shania Twain" and the subject matter refreshing. Mikael Wood of the Los Angeles Times considered the song to have sharp-witted lyrics. Variety's Chris Willman thought it contained a "sheer zipiness" in its theme of "teen heartbreak". Dani Blum of Pitchfork called the song a "delightful, strumming takedown" and Jess Cohen from E! News opined that the lyrics "don't disappoint". In a mid-year list of the 50 best songs of 2021 by a Billboard staff, where "Mr. Perfectly Fine" was featured, they commended the sharp lyrics and catchy production and viewed the song as "vintage Taylor Swift that still feels fresh in 2021."

Critics have included "Mr. Perfectly Fine" in their lists of Swift's "From the Vault" tracks. It was ranked among her ten best vault tracks by Lipshutz, Jack Viswanath of Bustle, Nylon, Time, and Josh Kurp of Uproxx. Viswanath lauded the song as one of the "most clever, witty, and catchy songs Swift has ever written". Time wrote that it was "Swift at her best, enraged, snarky, and not for a moment taking herself too seriously". Kurp, along with Rolling Stone's Rob Sheffield, believed that the song proved that its exclusion from the original album was not because it wasn't good enough.

== Accolades ==
Awards and nominations
Year	Organization	Award	Result	Ref.
2022	RTHK International Pop Poll Awards	Top Ten International Gold Songs	Won	

== Commercial performance ==
With 14.2 million streams, "Mr. Perfectly Fine" reached atop the US Billboard Country Streaming Songs and marked Swift's fifth number-one entry. The song rose to its peak of number two on Hot Country Songs from its opening week at number 30 and became her 26th top-10 chart entry. The song along with 18 tracks from Fearless (Taylor's Version) extended her record of the most entries in one week, surpassing her own 12 with the album Red (2012). On the overall Billboard Hot 100, "Mr. Perfectly Fine" climbed and peaked at number 30, when it began at number 90. The song became Swift's 80th top-40 entry on the chart and extended her record for the most top-40 entries among women. It peaked at number 11 on the Rolling Stone Top 100 when it garnered 12.7 million streams and sold 106,800 units.

Elsewhere, "Mr. Perfectly Fine" peaked within the top 50 of the Billboard Global 200 (19), Singapore (11), Ireland (15), Canada (23), New Zealand (25), and Venezuela (49). In Australia, the song debuted and peaked at number 19 on the ARIA Singles Chart upon the album's release. It received a double-platinum certification from the Australian Recording Industry Association (ARIA). In the United Kingdom, the song reached within the top 30 of the UK Singles Chart and was certified silver by the British Phonographic Industry (BPI). In Brazil, it was certified platinum by Pro-Música Brasil (PMB). "Mr. Perfectly Fine" was the most streamed track from Fearless (Taylor's Version) in 2021 with 98.8 million streams.

== Personnel ==
Credits are adapted from the liner notes of Fearless (Taylor's Version).

- Taylor Swift – lead vocals, songwriting, production
- Jack Antonoff – production, programming, backing vocals, acoustic guitar, bass, electric guitar, keyboards, modular synthesizer, percussion, recording
- Evan Smith – saxophones, synthesizers
- Michael Riddleberger – percussion
- Mikey Freedom Hart – 12-string guitar, electric guitar, pedal steel, B3
- Sean Hutchinson – drums
- Laura Sisk – recording
- John Rooney – assistant recording
- Jon Sher – assistant recording
- John Hanes – engineering
- Christopher Rowe – vocal engineering
- Serban Ghenea – mixing
- Randy Merrill – mastering

== Charts ==
=== Weekly charts ===
Weekly chart performance
Chart (2021)	Peak position
Australia (ARIA)	19
Belgium (Ultratip Bubbling Under Flanders)	24
Canada Hot 100 (Billboard)	23
Global 200 (Billboard)	19
Ireland (IRMA)	15
New Zealand (Recorded Music NZ)	25
Portugal (AFP)	143
Singapore (RIAS)	11
Slovakia Airplay (ČNS IFPI)	78
Sweden Heatseeker (Sverigetopplistan)	7
UK Singles (Official Charts)	30
US Billboard Hot 100	30
US Hot Country Songs (Billboard)	2
US Rolling Stone Top 100	11
Venezuela (Record Report)	49

=== Year-end charts ===
Year-end chart performance
Chart (2021)	Position
US Hot Country Songs (Billboard)	86

== Certifications ==
Certifications
Region	Certification	Certified units/sales
Australia (ARIA)	2× Platinum	140,000^{‡}
Brazil (Pro-Música Brasil)	Platinum	40,000^{‡}
United Kingdom (BPI)	Silver	200,000^{‡}
^{‡} Sales+streaming figures based on certification alone.

== Release history ==
List of releases
Region	Date	Format	Label	Ref.
Various	April 7, 2021	Digital download	Republic	
