= That's When =

2021 song by Taylor Swift featuring Keith Urban

Song by Taylor Swift featuring Keith Urban

from the album Fearless (Taylor's Version)
- Released: April 9, 2021
- Studio: Conway Recording (Los Angeles); Electric Lady (New York); Rough Customer (Brooklyn)
- Genre: Country pop; indie folk
- Length: 3:09
- Label: Republic
- Songwriters: Taylor Swift; Brad Warren; Brett Warren
- Producers: Taylor Swift; Jack Antonoff

Lyric video
- "That's When" on YouTube

"That's When" (Note: Subtitled as "(From the Vault)" on physical releases and as "(Taylor's Version) (From the Vault)" on digital releases) is a song by the American singer-songwriter Taylor Swift from her first re-recorded album, Fearless (Taylor's Version) (2021). Featuring Keith Urban, it is one of the album's "From the Vault" tracks that were intended for but excluded from Swift's second studio album, Fearless (2008). She wrote the song with the Warren Brothers at age 14 and produced it Jack Antonoff. "That's When" is an acoustic country pop and indie folk ballad about the end and aftermath of a relationship: Swift's and Urban's characters contemplate how to reunite with one another.

Critics received "That's When" with generally positive reviews, several of whom praised the collaboration and songwriting. Some commented on the production, while others deemed it underwhelming and derivative. Later reviews of the song were featured in rankings of Swift's repertoire. Commercially, "That's When" peaked at number 130 on the Billboard Global 200 and charted in Australia, Canada, and the United States. It received a gold certification in Australia.

== Background and release ==
After departing from Big Machine Records and signing a new contract with Republic Records in 2018, Taylor Swift began re-recording her first six studio albums in November 2020. The decision followed a public dispute in 2019 between Swift and the talent manager Scooter Braun, who acquired Big Machine, including the masters of her albums that the label had released. By re-recording the albums, Swift had full ownership of the new masters, which enabled her to control the licensing of her songs for commercial use and therefore substituted the Big Machine–owned masters.

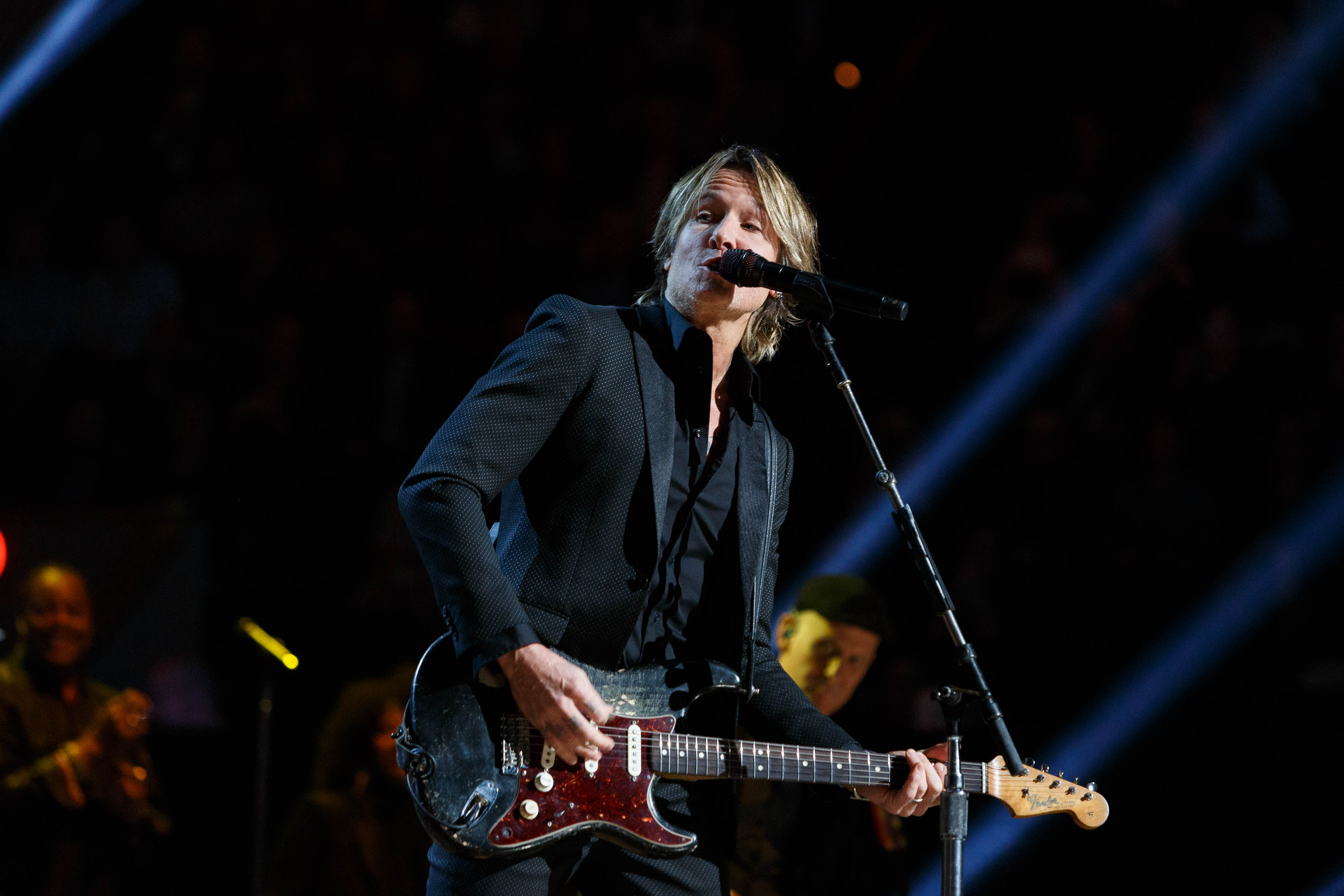
Keith Urban is featured on "That's When".

On February 11, 2021, Swift announced the first of her re-recorded albums, Fearless (Taylor's Version), a re-recording of Swift's second studio album, Fearless (2008). In addition to re-recordings of the original album's tracks, Fearless (Taylor's Version) additionally contained six previously unreleased "From the Vault" tracks, which are songs written for the original album that did not make the cut. Swift explained that these songs were left out of Fearless for various reasons and that including them on the re-recorded album proved that "the artist is the only one who really knows that body of work".

One such "From the Vault" track was "That's When", which Swift wrote with the Warren Brothers—a country music duo composed of Brad and Brett Warren—when she was 14 years old. Swift contacted the Warren Brothers 17 years later to inform them of her intention to release the song, and they responded that it was "the longest hold [they have] ever had". Reflecting back on her unreleased tracks, Swift believed that "That's When" would work better as a duet and could only imagine Keith Urban as the duet partner. Swift previously performed as an opening act at his Escape Together World Tour (2009) when promoting Fearless, and both of them collaborated on Tim McGraw's single "Highway Don't Care" (2013). After that, Swift asked him via text during his Christmas shopping to contribute vocals to the song and the fellow "From the Vault" track "We Were Happy". Urban enjoyed the songs after listening to them in a food court and agreed to include vocals.

On April 3, 2021, "That's When" was confirmed to be one of the "From the Vault" tracks after Swift teased it in a clip containing the title in a scrambled anagram the day before. The song was released as the 24th track on Fearless (Taylor's Version) on April 9. It peaked at number 130 on the Billboard Global 200 and entered the countries of Australia (81) and Canada (63). The song also received a gold certification from the Australian Recording Industry Association. In the United States, "That's When" charted on the Billboard Hot Country Songs and Bubbling Under Hot 100, with respective peaks of number thirty and number three. It also reached number 76 on the Rolling Stone Top 100. On May 26, 2021, "That's When" was included in the streaming compilation, Fearless (Taylor's Version): The From the Vault Chapter, which consists of the album's "From the Vault" tracks.

== Composition and lyrics ==
"That's When"
An acoustic country pop and indie folk ballad, "That's When" finds Swift's and Urban's characters singing about rekindling their relationship.

"That's When" is three minutes and nine seconds long. Swift produced the track with Jack Antonoff, who recorded it with Laura Sisk at Conway Recording Studios in Los Angeles, Electric Lady Studios in New York City, and Rough Customer Studio in Brooklyn. Christopher Rowe recorded Swift's vocals at Kitty Committee Studio in London and Nick Rowse recorded Urban's vocals at Forbes Street Studios in Sydney. Antonoff played acoustic, bass, and electric guitars, drums and percussion, Urban played a 12-string guitar, Evan Smith played flutes and saxophones, Mikey Freedom Hart played bass, electric, and pedal steel guitars, Celeste, drums, Hammond B-3, keyboards, piano, Michael Riddleberger played percussion, and Sean Hutchinson played drums. The song was mixed by Serban Ghenea at MixStar Studios in Virginia Beach and was mastered by Randy Merrill at Sterling Sound in Edgewater.

"That's When" is an acoustic country pop and indie folk ballad about the end and aftermath of a relationship. Set at a moderate tempo of 90 beats per minute, the song combines instruments from the country pop genre such as brush-played drums with more modern sounds like synthesizer layers and drum machine programming. Featuring a pop hook, Swift sings the song's first verse while Urban sings the second, and they harmonize with each other during the chorus. The lyrics discuss whether they should rekindle their relationship: Swift's character wonders if he would come back to her ("When can I come back?") and expresses forgiveness for breaking up with him. (Note: As described by Heather Singh of Exclaim!, Joseph Hudak and Rob Sheffield of Rolling Stone, and Annabel Gutterman of Time.) Both Swift's and Urban's characters agree to take a break from their relationship to make amends for their mistakes and head towards a brighter future. In Billboard, Jason Lipshutz described the production as "unfussy pop". Bobby Olivier of Spin opined that the song was a "peek into an alternate universe" in which Swift never left Nashville and remained in her trajectory of having a career similar to that of Carrie Underwood or Miranda Lambert.

== Critical reception ==
"That's When" received generally positive reviews from critics, several of whom praised Swift's and Urban's collaboration and the songwriting. Saloni Gajjar of The A.V. Club wrote that the collaboration "hits all the right soothing notes". Kelsey Barnes from Gigwise wrote that Swift's collaboration with Urban "fit perfectly alongside her other collaborations". Heather Taylor-Singh of Exclaim! selected "That's When" as exemplary of the "From the Vault" tracks as "a fun treat for fans who can't get enough of Swift's vivid storytelling". In a ranking of the album's six "From the Vault" tracks, Billboard's Jason Lipshutz placed the song at number five and opined that the song "offers a dose of levity" although being a breakup track. Slate's music critic Carl Wilson was impressed with Urban's part and described the track as a "lite-country-FM duet". Joseph Hudak of Rolling Stone called "That's When" an "introspective retelling of a romance at the brink".

Some critics commented on the production. Jonathan Bernstein from Rolling Stone opined that "That's When" was one of the "From the Vault" tracks that were "revelatory glimpses into Swift's working process" and that Swift enlisted Antonoff as its producer to "tackle her buttoned-up mid-aughts Nashville country pop". Olivier considered it an album highlight and a catchy duet that gives a glimpse into Swift's early career in country music. Hannah Mylrea of NME also viewed it as a highlight from the album and said it was a "woozy" song containing a "layer of slick 1989-style production" and "euphoric layered vocals". Erin Browne from Vulture commended how Antonoff kept the song "twangy and country", which he thought those aspects made "That's When" faithful to the music of the original Fearless while also being equal to the album's re-recording.

Others were more reserved in their praise. Jackson Langford of MTV ranked "That's When" fifth of the six "From the Vault" tracks and praised Urban's presence on the track, but believed that the song "still falls just short of greatness" and that he would have preferred it with Swift's early southern twang. The Observer's writer Kitty Empire considered "That's When" one of the "mixed bag[s]" of the album's "From the Vault" tracks. Chris Willman of Variety wrote that while "it's lovely to hear [Swift and Urban] together", the song does not feel as immersive in comparison to album's original tracks, dubbing it "a slightly more balladic" and inferior version of the fellow album track "You Belong with Me" (2009). In a similar sentiment from The New York Times's Jon Pareles, the chorus in "That's When" used a similar melody that he thought was "perfectly" utilized on "You Belong with Me", which led to him opining that the former was left out from Fearless due to that melodic similarity.

Later reviews of "That's When" were featured in lists and rankings of Swift's discography. Rolling Stone's Rob Sheffield and Vulture's Nate Jones ranked it at 234 and 224, respectively, in worst-to-best lists of Swift's catalog. Billboard writers believed that the song was the ideal "country post-breakup duet" and thought Swift and Urban had "magnificent" harmonies with each other. Sheffield wrote that the song's theme of forgiving someone for breaking their heart without reason was in the style of her tracks "Afterglow" (2019) and "Back to December" (2010). Jake Viswanath of Bustle believed that "That's When" was an "immediate country ditty that proves Swift can come up with pop hooks in seconds". Annabel Gutterman from Time found it had "wistful and remorseful turns". Steffanee Wang of Nylon said that the song had a "pretty" instrumentation and a catchy hook and thought Swift's and Urban's vocals worked well with each other, but opined that it did not have "the deeper substance in the songwriting that we've come accustomed to". Josh Kurp from Uproxx felt that "That's When" was a "fine song that fails to leave much of an impression", while Jones believed that it was similar to "You Belong with Me" and that Urban added "a bit of country verisimilitude but not much interest".

== Credits and personnel ==
Credits are adapted from liner notes of Fearless (Taylor's Version).

- Taylor Swift – vocals, songwriting, production
- Keith Urban – vocals, 12-string acoustic guitar
- Brad Warren – songwriting
- Brett Warren – songwriting
- Jack Antonoff – production, acoustic guitar, bass, drums, electric guitar, record engineering, keyboards, percussion
- Mike Freedom Hart – bass, celesta, drums, electric guitar, Hammond B3, keyboards, pedal steel, piano
- Evan Smith — flute, saxophone
- John Rooney – assistant record engineering
- Jon Sher – assistant record engineering
- Sean Hutchinson – drums
- John Hanes – engineering
- Randy Merrill — master engineering
- Serban Ghenea — mixing
- Michael Riddleberger — percussion
- David Hart – record engineering
- Laura Sisk – record engineering
- Christopher Rowe – vocal engineering
- Nick Rowse – vocal engineering

== Charts ==
Chart performance
Chart (2021)	Peak position
Australia (ARIA)	81
Canada Hot 100 (Billboard)	63
Global 200 (Billboard)	130
US Bubbling Under Hot 100 (Billboard)	3
US Hot Country Songs (Billboard)	30
US Rolling Stone Top 100	76

== Certification ==
Certifications
Region	Certification	Certified units/sales
Australia (ARIA)	Gold	35,000^{‡}
^{‡} Sales+streaming figures based on certification alone.
