= Steel Train =

American indie rock band

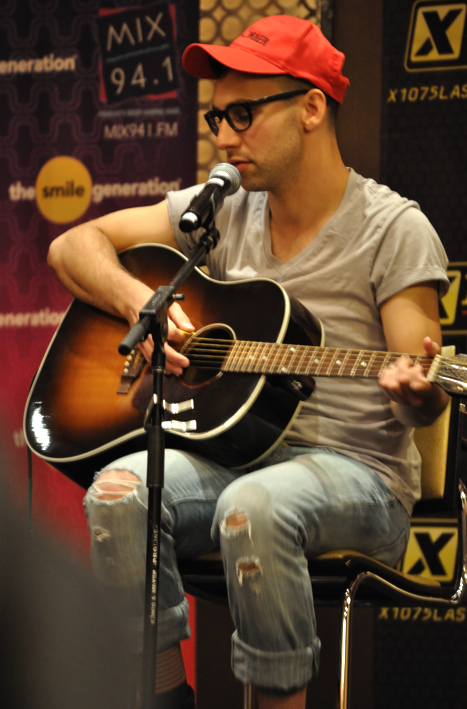
- Steel Train (February 2010 photo by L. Byrnes)

Background information
- Origin: New Jersey, USA
- Genres: Indie rock; indie emo; emo-folk; folk rock
- Years active: 2002–2013
- Label: Drive Thru
- Spinoffs: Red Hearse; Bleachers; Fun
- Past members: Matthias Gruber; Matthew Goldman; Scott Irby-Ranniar; Jack Antonoff; Evan Winiker; Daniel Silbert; Jon Shiffman; Justin Huey

Steel Train was an indie rock band from New Jersey. They performed at Bonnaroo, Lollapalooza, Coachella, Late Night with Conan O'Brien, and Late Show with David Letterman, and toured with several acts, including Tegan and Sara, Fun, Ben Folds, O.A.R., Finch, and the Get Up Kids. The band played their final show at the Bowery Ballroom in January 2013.

== History ==
=== 2001–2004: Formation and career beginnings ===
Steel Train met in the mid-1990s at The Solomon Schechter Day School of Bergen County, New Jersey. At the time, Jack Antonoff (vocals, guitar) and Daniel Silbert (vocals, guitar, sampler) were part of the hardcore band Outline and Evan Winiker (vocals, bass) and Matt Goldman (vocals, guitar) were in the punk band Random Task. After the dissolution of these bands, Steel Train formed in 2001, and performed their first public concert at showcase setup by their promoter/producer, (and former Random Task Manager) Heath Miller of Excess dB Entertainment, at the venue Club Krome on September 15, 2001 with their soon to be label mates, Allister and The Early November.

The band soon signed to Drive Thru Records/MCA and flew to Los Angeles to record with Jon Naclerio at Hans Zimmer's Media Ventures Studios. The outcome of this session was the band's first EP, 2003's For You My Dear. In January and February 2003, the group supported Finch on their headlining US tour, followed by a support slot for Rx Bandits in July. On November 11, 2003, the band released 1969, a cover EP of five songs originally released in 1969 and one song originally released in 1977. In January 2004, the band played a handful of shows on the east coast and Midwest.

=== 2005–2009: Twilight Tales From the Prairies on the Sun and Trampoline ===
After months of touring, the band moved to San Francisco to record their first full-length record with Steven Barncard (Grateful Dead, Crosby, Stills, Nash & Young, Joe Cocker). Released on April 19, 2005, Twilight Tales From The Prairies on the Sun features appearances by famed mandolinist David Grisman, as well as pedal steel guitarist Gene Parsons (The Flying Burrito Brothers/The Byrds).

In 2006, the band toured heavily and was also the beginning of Steel Train's festival career. They played a midnight set on the first day of the Bonnaroo Music Festival in Manchester, Tennessee, as well as the Wakarusa Festival, Warped Tour, SXSW, and another appearance at Bonnaroo in 2006. After two years straight on the road, original members Matt Goldman, Matthias Gruber left the band to pursue other careers. At this point, Antonoff and Winiker moved to Silverlake, CA to record the band's second full-length album, Trampoline, with Mark Trombino. After recording, the band once again embarked on the road, this time recruiting three new members: Jon Shiffman, Justin Huey, and Daniel Silbert, who up to that point had been the band's tour manager.

Trampoline, released in October 2007, debuted at No. 10 on Billboard's Heatseaker Chart. In support of the album, Steel Train toured with Ace Enders and A Million Different People, Socratic, Kevin Devine, The Starting Line, Paper Rival, Bayside, and Forgive Durden, among other bands. They also played prominent spots at the Lollapalooza Festival as well as their third appearance at Bonnaroo.

In the summer of 2008, the band would make their national television debut on Late Night with Conan O'Brien. Following the Late Night with Conan O'Brien performance and a tour with The Hush Sound, the band headed back into the studio, this time to record their third full-length album with producer Steve McDonald (Be Your Own Pet, Fun). It was at this time that the band's relationship with their label, Drive Thru Records, fell apart. Steel Train decided to buy off the label and fund their record themselves. In winter 2009, they opened for Tegan and Sara on their US Tour and appeared at Coachella Music Festival in Indio, California.

=== 2010–2013: Steel Train and disbandment ===
Once again the band hit the road, touring with Tegan and Sara, Ben Folds, and Fun, as well as playing 2010's Coachella Music Festival and making their 2nd appearance on National TV on the Late Show with David Letterman. The band released their third full-length album, titled Steel Train, on June 29, 2010 through their own label, Terrible Thrills. The record debuted at No. 8 on Billboard's Heatseakers Chart, No. 4 on the New Artists Chart and within the top 50 on the independent albums chart.

In early June 2010, the band announced that they would be releasing a companion album to Steel Train featuring female artists covering each of the 12 tracks. The companion album, entitled Terrible Thrills Vol. 1, includes appearances by Tegan and Sara, Scarlett Johansson, Deradoorian of Dirty Projectors, Amanda Palmer, Anna Waronker of That Dog, Alia Shawkat, Charlotte Caffey of The Go Go's, Rachael Cantu, Rachel Antonoff, Holly Miranda, and Greta Salpeter of The Hush Sound and Gold Motel.

The band hit the road once again with appearances at Yo Gabba Gabba!, the hit children's show, as well as tours with O.A.R., Fun, and the Get Up Kids. In August 2010, Steel Train was a guest on Anything Anything with Rich Russo where they performed three songs: "Bullet", "I Feel Weird", and a cover of Tegan and Sara's "Call it Off". On November 1, 2010 the band was the first musical guest on Conan O'Briens new show, Conan, in a joke episode titled "Show Zero". The band, along with actor Jim Parsons (The Big Bang Theory) performed one chord off their new record, Steel Train, in a short version of the show.

In early 2011, the band performed on NPR's World Cafe with David Dye as well as NPR's Free at Noon. On January 11, the band returned to Conan O'Brien's Conan, performing their single "You and I Undercover". Steel Train appeared at Sunfest in West Palm Beach, Florida as the opening band for MGMT on April 30, 2011. On November 13, 2012, Antonoff announced on his Tumblr that "there are no immediate plans to get things up and running again", and that the band would have a final show at the Bowery Ballroom on January 5, 2013. They returned for the Shadow of the City Festival in 2016.

== Band members ==
Band member	Duration	Instruments
Jack Antonoff	2002-2013	Vocals, guitar, drums, piano
Evan Winiker	2002–2013	bass, backing vocals
Daniel Silbert	2006–2013	lead guitar, backing vocals, sampler
Jon Shiffman	2006–2013	drums, percussion
Justin Huey	2008–2013	vocals, piano, Wurlitzer
Matthias Gruber	2002–2006	drums, percussion
Matthew Goldman	2002–2006	guitar, backing vocals
Scott Irby-Ranniar	2002–2008	vocals, piano, Wurlitzer

== Discography ==
=== Studio albums ===
List of studio albums, with selected chart positions
Title	Album details	Peak chart positions	
Title	Album details	US Heat.	US Indie
Twilight Tales from the Prairies of the Sun	Released: April 19, 2005; Label: Drive-Thru; Formats: CD, DL	—	—
Trampoline	Released: October 16, 2007; Label: Drive-Thru; Formats: CD, DL	10	34
Steel Train	Released: June 29, 2010; Label: Terrible Thrills; Formats: CD, DL, LP	8	48

=== Extended plays ===
List of studio albums, with selected chart positions
Title	Album details
For You My Dear	Released: January 28, 2003; Label: Drive-Thru; Formats: CD, digital download
1969	Released: November 11, 2003; Label: Drive-Thru, Eat Sleep; Formats: CD, LP

=== Compilation albums ===
List of studio albums, with selected chart positions
Title	Album details
Terrible Thrills, Vol. 1	Released: June 29, 2010; Label: Terrible Thrills; Formats: Streaming

=== Singles ===
- Bullet (2010)
- Turnpike Ghost (2010)
