= Fearless (Taylor's Version) =

2021 re-recorded album by Taylor Swift

Studio album (re-recorded) by Taylor Swift
- Released: April 9, 2021
- Studios: Blackbird (Nashville); Conway Recording (Los Angeles); Electric Lady (New York); Kitty Committee East (London); Long Pond (New York); Prime Recording (Nashville); Rough Customer (Brooklyn)
- Genre: Country pop
- Length: 106:20
- Label: Republic
- Producers: Taylor Swift; Christopher Rowe; Jack Antonoff; Aaron Dessner

Taylor Swift chronology
Evermore (2020)	Fearless (Taylor's Version) (2021)	Red (Taylor's Version) (2021)

Fearless (Taylor's Version) is the first re-recorded album by the American singer-songwriter Taylor Swift. It was released on April 9, 2021, through Republic Records, as part of Swift's re-recording project following the 2019 dispute over the master recordings of her back catalogue. The album is a re-recording of Swift’s second studio album, Fearless (2008).

A country pop album, Fearless (Taylor's Version), includes re-recorded versions of the songs from Swift's 2008 studio album Fearless and the soundtrack single "Today Was a Fairytale" for the 2010 film Valentine's Day. These re-recorded tracks replicate the original arrangements consisting of acoustic instruments like guitars, banjo, and fiddle. Fearless (Taylor's Version) additionally includes six previously unreleased "From the Vault" tracks, which feature indie and electronic elements brought by synthesizers and drum programming. (Note: This article refers to these tracks as "vault tracks" hereafter for concision.) Maren Morris and Keith Urban featured as guest vocalists. Swift produced the re-recorded tracks with Christopher Rowe and the vault tracks with Jack Antonoff and Aaron Dessner. The lyrics are about her adolescent reflections and feelings on love and heartbreak.

Three songs were released for download and streaming prior to the album's release: "Love Story (Taylor's Version)" (the re-recording of Fearless's lead single, "Love Story"), "You All Over Me", and "Mr. Perfectly Fine". Fearless (Taylor's Version) became the first re-recorded album to reach number one on the US Billboard 200, and it topped the charts in Australia, Canada, New Zealand, and the United Kingdom. It was later certified quadruple platinum by the Recording Industry Association of America (RIAA). Most critics who praised the album highlighted the enhanced production quality with sharper instruments and stronger vocals of the re-recorded tracks, which brought a refreshing listening experience and a nostalgic feel. Although some reviews complimented the vault tracks for showcasing Swift's songcraft at a young age, others considered them insubstantial to the original album.

== Background ==
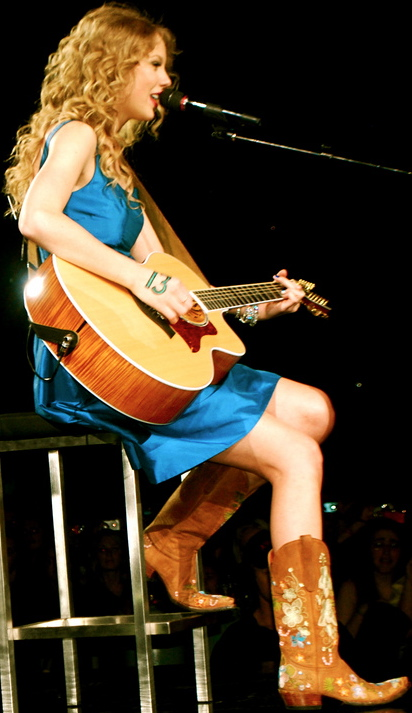
Swift on her first headlining tour, the Fearless Tour, in 2010

Taylor Swift signed a publishing contract with Sony/ATV Tree Publishing in 2004, at 14 years old, to become a songwriter, and a recording contract with Nashville-based independent record label Big Machine the next year to become a country singer. Her self-titled debut studio album (2006) was the longest-charting album on the Billboard 200 of the 2000s, and it established Swift as one of country music's rising stars. Her second studio album, Fearless, was released on November 11, 2008. A country pop album, Fearless, followed the country styling of Swift's debut and incorporated radio-friendly pop crossover and pop rock elements. It spent 11 weeks atop the Billboard 200 and, supported by the pop-radio hits "Love Story" and "You Belong with Me", catapulted Swift into mainstream prominence beyond the country-music scene. Critics lauded Swift's songwriting for portraying earnest teenage feelings, and musicologist James E. Perone commented that Fearless transformed her status from a prodigy to a "singer-songwriter superstar". The most-awarded country album in history, it won Album of the Year at the Academy of Country Music Awards, the Country Music Association Awards, and the Grammy Awards.

As part of Swift's contract, Big Machine released her next four studio albums, from Speak Now (2010) to Reputation (2017). She parted ways with the label after her contract expired in 2018 and thereafter signed a new contract with Republic Records, a division of Universal Music Group. In 2019, the talent manager Scooter Braun and his company, Ithaca Holdings, acquired Big Machine Records. The masters of Swift's Big Machine-released albums, including Fearless, were effectively transferred to Braun, which resulted in a public dispute between Swift and Braun. Swift denounced the purchase and began re-recording her first six studio albums, including Fearless, in November 2020. By re-recording the albums, Swift had full ownership of the new masters, which enabled her to control the licensing of her songs for commercial use and therefore substituted the Big Machine–owned masters. On February 11, 2021, she announced on Good Morning America the re-recording of Fearless, to which she added the subtitle Taylor's Version. It was the first of her four re-recorded albums.

== Production ==
Fearless (Taylor's Version) comprises re-recordings of all 19 tracks on the original Platinum Edition release from 2009, 13 of which were first released in 2008, and six were Platinum Edition bonus tracks. Swift wanted to replicate the original production on the re-recording and thus examined the original tracks line by line and her vocal inflections. She revisited some parts with the aim of creating a "same but better" version in mind. She worked with members of her touring band who played in the 2008 sessions. For instance, on the re-recording of Fearless's lead single "Love Story", those who reprised their roles included Jonathan Yudkin on fiddle, Amos Heller on bass guitar, and Caitlin Evanson on harmony vocals. Colbie Caillat returned as a featured artist on the re-recording of "Breathe". Caillat said she agreed to Swift's invitation and went to Nashville to re-record her vocals the same day that Swift invited her to. The re-recorded album also features "Today Was a Fairytale", a soundtrack single Swift first recorded for the 2010 film Valentine's Day.

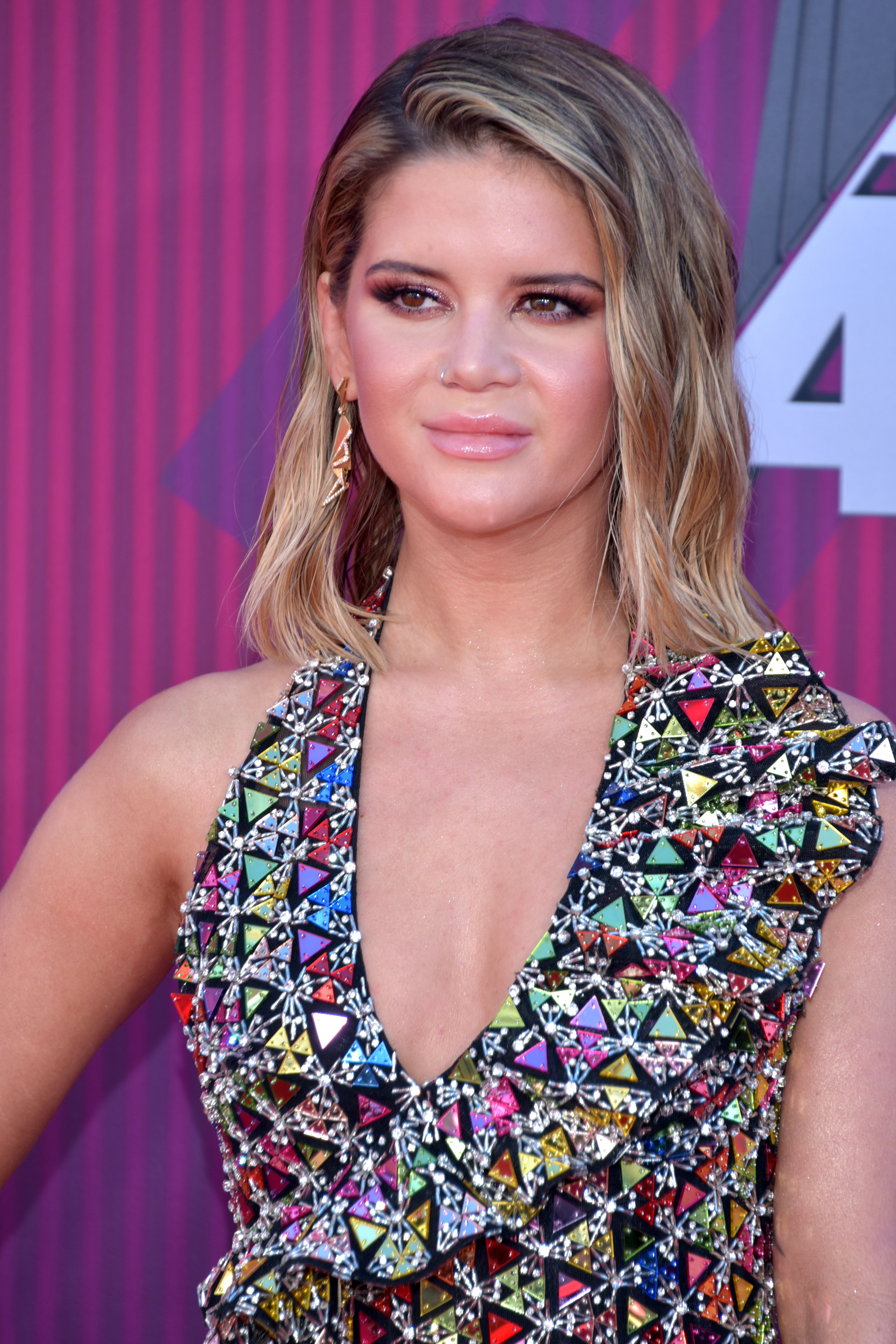
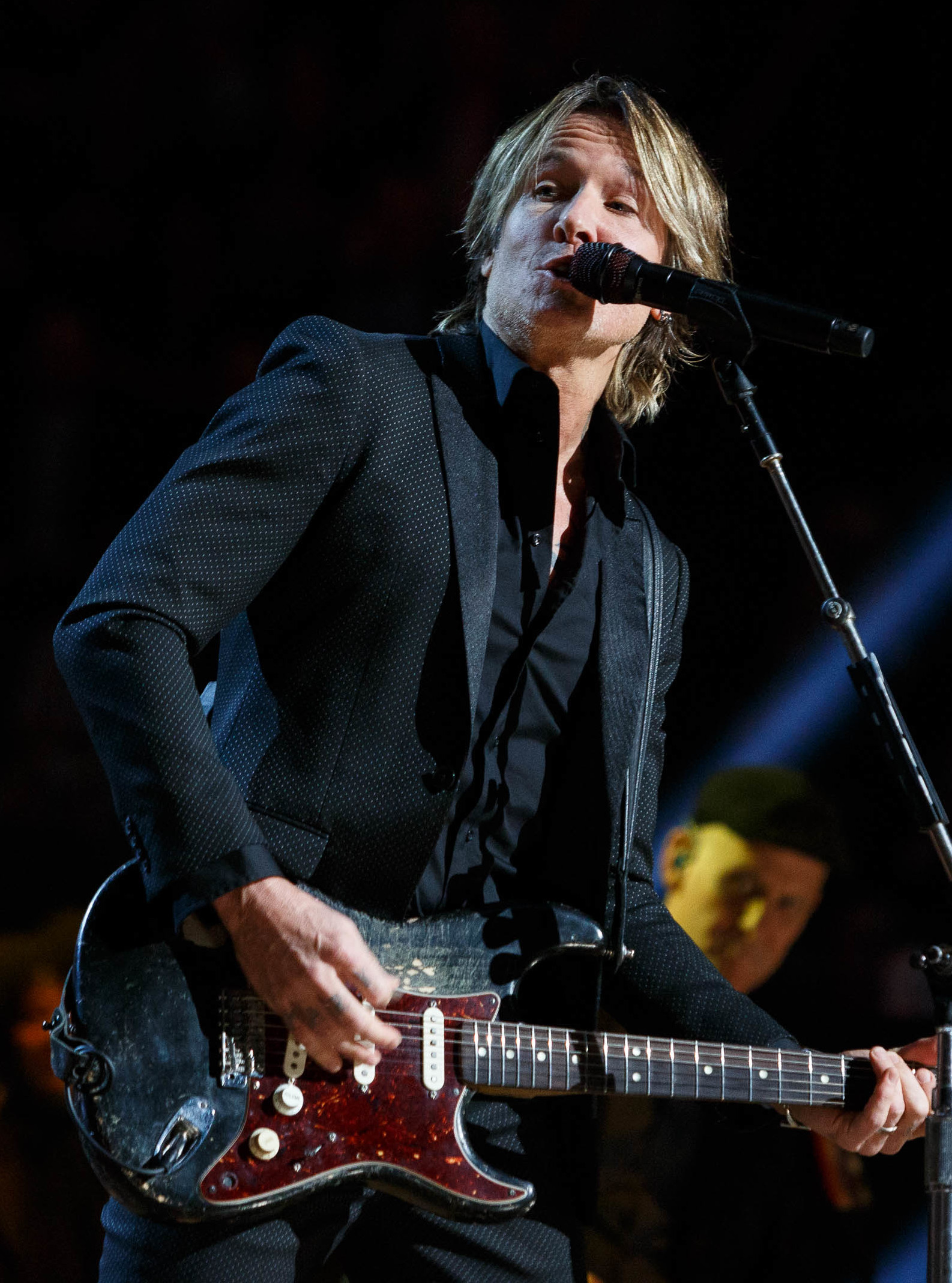
Maren Morris (left) featured on "You All Over Me", and Keith Urban (right) featured on "That's When" and played electric guitar and provided harmony vocals on "We Were Happy".

In addition to the re-recordings, Fearless (Taylor's Version) contains six unreleased tracks that Swift wrote when she was in her teenage years and intended to include in, but ultimately left out of, the original Fearless release. These tracks are subtitled "From the Vault" in the physical releases and "(Taylor's Version) (From the Vault)" on streaming platforms. (Note: As adapted from Apple Music and Spotify) Swift said by including these unreleased tracks, which she "absolutely adored" but "were held back for different reasons", the re-recorded album proved that "the artist is the only one who really knows that body of work". (Note: In a note published on her social media on April 11, 2021, Swift cited some reasons: " [sic] don't want too many break-up songs, don't want too many down-tempo songs, can't that fit that many songs on a physical CD".) Maren Morris appears as a featured artist on "You All Over Me", and Keith Urban on "That's When". Urban played electric guitar and contributed harmony vocals, but was uncredited as a featured artist on "We Were Happy". Swift toured as an opening act to Urban's 2009 Escape Together World Tour, and Urban agreed to record with Swift after she contacted him via text message.

Swift and Christopher Rowe produced the 20 re-recorded tracks, which are all subtitled "Taylor's Version". David Payne recorded them at Black Bird and Prime Recording Studios in Nashville, and Rowe recorded Swift's lead vocals at Kitty Committee Studio, which is Swift's home studio in London. Jack Antonoff and Aaron Dessner respectively co-produced four and two vault tracks; both had produced Swift's 2020 albums Folklore and Evermore. Antonoff and engineer Laura Sisk recorded them at Conway Recording Studios in Los Angeles, Electric Lady Studios in New York, and Rough Customer Studio in Brooklyn. Dessner and Bella Basko's contributions were recorded at the Long Pond Studio in Hudson Valley. In total, Fearless (Taylor's Version) comprises 26 tracks, (Note: Digital and streaming editions. The 27-track physical edition features a remix of "Love Story (Taylor's Version)" by Swedish producer Evilra as a bonus track.) and Swift is credited as the sole writer on 11 of them. (Note: Including two versions of a same song: "Forever & Always (Taylor's Version)" and "Forever & Always (Piano Version) (Taylor's Version)") Serban Ghenea mixed the album at MixStar Studios in Virginia Beach, Virginia, and Randy Merrill mastered it at Sterling Sound in Edgewater, New Jersey.

== Music and lyrics ==
=== Composition ===
Fearless (Taylor's Version) is a country pop album that features country-music instruments such as guitars, banjo, and fiddles. (Note: Attributed to reviews by The New York Times' critics' panel, The Daily Telegraph's Neil McCormick, and Clash's Lucy Harbron) They incorporate prominent pop and pop-rock elements; Alexis Petridis of The Guardian found them to have "indelible melodies and choruses with the efficiency of a Nordic pop factory". Written during Swift's teenage years, the lyrics explore her coming of age and the feelings and reflections ensuing from love that many teenagers could relate to: heartbreak, first kisses, frustrations, and dreams. (Note: As described by such critics as Petridis, McCormick, and Sarah Carson for i)

The 20 re-recorded tracks feature the same arrangements and lyrics as on the original recordings, which led many critics to comment that a casual listener might not catch any differences. (Note: Attributed to The New York Times, McCormick, and Carl Wilson for Slate) The production has a clearer fidelity, a clearer mix, and more defined instruments—Pitchfork's Dani Blum said "each peal of guitar is sharper". Michael A. Lee, a professor in commercial music, said the re-recorded album has a much richer sound because it was recorded with more use of the outside environment, which allows the mixes to "spread a lot wider". According to Lee, the engineers equalized the instruments with a fuller range of frequencies, incorporating mid- and low-frequency elements, which made the instruments sound "more like themselves," whereas the original's sounded thin because of their "bright high ends". Some critics identified certain tweaks: Blum said the re-recorded "Love Story" features an "invigorating blast of fiddle", and according to Jon Pareles from The New York Times, the title track "Fearless" omits the original's 10-second organ intro, and "Tell Me Why" scraps the fiddle echo. Lee wrote each re-recorded track prioritizes certain parts—the tambourine is clearer and the guitar solo is less distorted in "Change", the cymbals in the break of "Hey Stephen" are louder, and the guitars and strings on "Breathe", "You're Not Sorry", and "Today Was a Fairytale" are more prominent because they were recorded at a closer vicinity to the microphones.

A multitude of critics said that Swift's vocals were the most significant change; although she sang the same notes and retained a light country-music twang, they became richer, deeper, and more controlled. (Note: Attributed to McCormick, The New York Times, Rolling Stone's Jonathan Bernstein, and Spin's Bobby Olivier) Clash's Lucy Harbron attributed this change to Swift's artistic evolution encompassing country, pop, and indie styles. The drums are occasionally tuned a degree lower than the original to match Swift's deeper vocal tones. Lee pointed to "You're Not Sorry" as the re-recorded track where her voice most improved: it sounded "less nasal and more from the chest". Paula Clare Harper, an assistant professor in musicology, agreed that Swift performed with more chest-driven vocals but also said she retained some "signature aspects" of country music. Many critics remarked how Swift's matured vocals brought forth a different listening experience: Blum felt they had an air of melancholy, and Pareles said they reflected Swift's wisdom at 30 years when she looked back at her teenage experiences. Slate's Carl Wilson wrote that although Swift managed to recreate her once-teenage vocal inflections and mannerisms, her matured voice made the album sound nostalgic. For Lee, the re-recorded tracks lose the original's sense of earnestness because Swift seemed more hesitant on some of the lyrics which, "she maybe was able to sing [...] in a little more unmitigated way".

=== "From the Vault" tracks ===
On the six "From the Vault" tracks, Antonoff and Dessner reprised some of their production styles on Swift's albums Folklore and Evermore, creating a sound that infuses country pop with indie elements brought by diverse instruments such as synthesizers, horns, and programmed drums. Consequence's Katie Moulton selected "Don't You" and "Bye Bye Baby" as the tracks with "electronic atmospherics" that deviated from the overarching acoustic sounds of Fearless. Thematically, the vault tracks are about past romantic relationships, and their lyrics feature melodramatic tendencies from an adolescent perspective. For some critics, they offered a glimpse into Swift's songwriting process and how it evolved over her next albums, and her grown-up reflection on her once youthful optimism.

"You All Over Me", a track about being unable to move on from an ex-lover, is an acoustic ballad with country-indebted guitars, fiddles, and harmonica, alongside synth drum loops. "Mr. Perfectly Fine" is a track combining country, pop rock, and rock and roll, with a prominent pop melody instrumented by synth accents and dynamic refrains. The song's lyrics contain sarcastic remarks at a former lover. The slow-paced "We Were Happy" is about reminiscing over the beautiful moments of a broken relationship, such as watching sunsets together, dreaming about buying a family farm, and getting married. The couple in question split even though they were still happy, which made the ending hard for the narrator to accept. Its minimal instrumental incorporates a chiming guitar riff, accents of cello and lap steel guitar, and vocal harmonies from Urban.

"Don't You"
"Don't You" has an atmospheric electronic production brought by the use of layered keyboards, electric guitars, and drums.

In "That's When", a country pop and indie folk tune with layered vocal harmonies, Swift and Urban duet about two past lovers reuniting after making amends for their past mistakes. "Don't You" is a minimalist pop track with an atmospheric electronic production that incorporates layered keyboards—including a prominent Rhodes piano throughout, flutes, electric guitars, and drums, The lyrics of "Don't You" depict the narrator running into a former lover and pining for their past relationship. The closing track, "Bye Bye Baby", whose demo had circulated on the internet for years, is about the narrator being resolute in letting go of a broken romance that no longer serves them. Its melancholic production consists of thrumming beats and a unison of violin, Wurlitzer organ, and flute.

== Marketing and release ==
Compared to the extensive promotional rollouts of Swift's other albums, Fearless (Taylor's Version) was preceded by a rather minimal campaign that relied on social media. Pitchfork included it in their list of the most anticipated albums for spring 2021. On February 11, Swift announced Fearless (Taylor's Version) on Good Morning America and her social media. The following day, she released "Love Story (Taylor's Version)". It peaked at number one on the Hot Country Songs chart and made Swift the second artist, after Dolly Parton, to have both the original and re-recorded versions of a song atop the chart. Two vault tracks, "You All Over Me" and "Mr. Perfectly Fine", were released for download and streaming on March 25 and April 7. Both reached the top 10 on Hot Country Songs; they respectively peaked at number six and number two.

Before releasing the track list on April 3, Swift teased the titles of the vault tracks through an animated clip containing scrambled anagrams on her social media. In the hours leading up to the album's release, Swift released snippets of some re-recorded tracks across social media platforms. On April 8, the singer-songwriters Olivia Rodrigo and Conan Gray, who had been contacted by Swift, posted clips of themselves dancing to excerpts of "You Belong with Me (Taylor's Version)" on TikTok and "White Horse (Taylor's Version)" on Instagram. Other snippets made available on social media were those of "Fifteen (Taylor's Version)" on Snapchat, "Breathe (Taylor's Version)" on Tumblr, and "Hey Stephen (Taylor's Version)" on Twitter. She again appeared on Good Morning America to preview "Fearless (Taylor's Version)". Related merchandise, including clothes and accessories, all featured the extended moniker "Taylor's Version". The New York Times' Ben Sisario commented that this promotion created a "communal and celebratory experience" for Swift's fans who found the music nostalgic and the "Taylor's Version" branding empowering.

Republic Records released Fearless (Taylor's Version) on April 9, 2021. The cover artwork is a sepia-toned photograph of Swift shot from a low camera angle that shows herself with windblown hair locks. In it, she recreates her pose on the original album cover but looks in the opposite direction. The standard physical copies were made available for pre-order on Swift's website, and CDs with collectible posters were available for pre-order exclusively at Target. The vinyl LPs came in two editions, one golden in color and the other red; the former was available on Swift's website, and the latter at Target. Swift appeared on The Late Show with Stephen Colbert on April 13, 2021. In the weeks after the album's release, Swift put out four streaming-exclusive compilation "chapters" that feature select tracks from Fearless (Taylor's Version): The Halfway Out the Door Chapter, The Kissing in the Rain Chapter, The I Remember What You Said Last Night Chapter, and The From the Vault Chapter. On September 20, 2021, she released limited-edition autographed CDs exclusively via her website for 72 hours.

== Commercial performance ==
Fearless (Taylor's Version) amassed 50 million global first-day streams on Spotify. In the United States, the album was Swift's ninth consecutive to debut atop the Billboard 200. Of its first-week tally of 291,000 album-equivalent units, 179,000 were pure album sales. It was the first re-recorded album to reach number one and registered the biggest sales week for a country album since 2015. With Folklore, Evermore, and Fearless (Taylor's Version), Swift became the first female artist to have three number-one albums in less than a year. Fearless (Taylor's Version) was her sixth number one on Top Country Albums, and 18 of its tracks charted on Hot Country Songs the same week. The album made Swift return to the top of Billboard's Artist 100 chart for a record-extending 47th week. Following the release of its vinyl LPs and signed CDs, Fearless (Taylor's Version) returned to number one on the Billboard 200 for a second week, from number 157, the third-largest jump to number one in history. It was the fifth-best-selling album of 2021 in the United States, with sales of 521,000 copies. Fearless (Taylor's Version) had accumulated 1.81 million album-equivalent units, of which 737,000 were pure sales, in the United States by July 2023. The RIAA certified the album quadruple platinum in September 2025.

In the Anglosphere, Fearless (Taylor's Version) peaked atop the charts of Australia, Canada, Ireland, New Zealand, and the United Kingdom. It made Swift the female musician with the most number-one albums of the 21st century in Australia, Ireland, and the United Kingdom. In Australia, Fearless (Taylor's Version) topped the chart 17 weeks after Evermore, which registered the fewest weeks between two number-one albums by the same artist. In the United Kingdom, it helped Swift surpass the Beatles to claim the fastest accumulation of three number-one albums. It also reached number one in Argentina. In China, Fearless (Taylor's Version) sold more than 205,000 copies on digital music platforms in less than five minutes. On some album charts, sales of Fearless (Taylor's Version) helped bolster the chart performance of the original Fearless, which reached new peaks in 2021, including number two in Austria and Germany, and number three in Switzerland.

The album was certified triple platinum in Canada, double platinum in New Zealand, and platinum in Australia, France, and the United Kingdom. According to a March 2022 report from the International Federation of the Phonographic Industry, Fearless (Taylor's Version) was one of the 10 global best-selling albums of 2021, with pure sales of 980,000 copies.

== Critical reception ==
Professional ratings
Aggregate scores
Source	Rating
AnyDecentMusic?	7.7/10
Metacritic	82/100
Review scores
Source	Rating
AllMusic	3/5 stars
The A.V. Club	A
Clash	8/10
The Daily Telegraph	5/5 stars
The Guardian	4/5 stars
The Independent	4/5 stars
NME	4/5 stars
Pitchfork	7.5/10
Rolling Stone	4/5 stars
The Times	4/5 stars

On Metacritic, a review aggregator site that assigns a normalized score out of 100 to ratings from mainstream publications, Fearless (Taylor's Version) received a weighted mean score of 82 based on 17 reviews, indicating "universal acclaim". AnyDecentMusic? compiled 16 reviews and gave it an average score of 7.7 out of 10.

Critics praised the re-recording's production for remaining faithful to the original and felt it had an enhanced quality. Many complimented the production as crisper and warmer, (Note: Attributed to reviews by Harbron, The A.V. Club's Saloni Gajjar, NME's Hannah Mylrea, and The Observer's Kitty Empire) but Rolling Stone's Jonathan Bernstein thought the re-recorded tracks were "less slick". The Guardian's Alexis Petridis and The Daily Telegraph's Neil McCormick wrote that Fearless (Taylor's Version) made them appreciate Fearless as an outstanding album filled with catchy melodies. Praise also directed toward Swift's vocals for how they became fuller and richer while retaining the teenage sentiments, (Note: Attributed to reviews by Cormick, The New York Times, Olivier, and Rolling Stone's Jonathan Bernstein) but some said that her voice conveyed the messages from a nostalgic or rather melancholy perspective and at times lost the earnestness of the original recordings.

Another point of praise was Swift's lyrics: many critics remarked that the songs explore the feelings that not only teenagers but also many people could relate to, which made Fearless (Taylor's Version) a reminder of how the original album withstood the test of time and an introduction to a new generation of Swift's fans. (Note: Attributed to reviews by McCormick, Carson, the Financial Times' Ludovic Hunter-Tilney, and The Line of Best Fit's Ross Horton) Will Hodgkinson of The Times lauded the album as "a masterclass in classic Nashville songwriting". Petridis and Ludovic Hunter-Tilney of the Financial Times wrote that the songs are timeless because they explore and mythologize the adolescent feelings that will become snapshots of one's youth for them to look back in their life. Slant Magazine's Jonathan Keefe was more critical and said the songwriting tropes and lyrical imagery were "juvenile" compared to Swift's later albums.

The vault tracks received mixed reviews. Some critics deemed them inferior to the re-recorded Fearless tracks, (Note: Attributed to reviews by Empire, Petridis, Blum, and the Los Angeles Times' Mikael Wood) but others appreciated them for offering a glimpse into Swift's evolving songwriting at the time. Variety's Chris Willman particularly enjoyed "You All Over Me" and "Mr. Perfectly Fine" but deemed the remaining tracks rather dull. Keefe praised the vault tracks for showcasing Swift's "preternatural gifts for song structure and melody" but deemed them insubstantial and their lyrics weak. Saloni Gajjar of The A.V. Club thought otherwise and opined that they fit in well with the album, and McCormick was impressed with the "sharp turns of phrase and touches of biting wit" of "We Were Happy" and "Bye Bye Baby". Spin's Bobby Olivier and AllMusic's Stephen Thomas Erlewine said the vault tracks are the album's most appealing, and the latter appreciated them for blending their "younger, dewy-eyed perspective" with a "mature" production from Dessner and Antonoff.

== Accolades and impact ==
Swift did not submit Fearless (Taylor's Version) to contend for the Grammy Awards and Country Music Association Awards. A Republic Records statement explained that Swift decided to do so because she wanted the awards committee to focus on Evermore, which was submitted for all eligible Grammy categories. It added that the decision came after Swift's "careful consideration" regarding the original Fearless's status as the most-awarded country album up to that time. At the 2022 Billboard Music Awards, Fearless (Taylor's Version) was nominated for Top Country Album, which was won by Red (Taylor's Version), another re-recorded album by Swift. After Fearless (Taylor's Version) was released, the original Fearless dropped in sales and, as of July 2023, did not reappear on the Billboard 200 chart.

Journalists described Fearless (Taylor's Version) as a key event in raising awareness for artists' rights in the music industry. They considered the Taylor's Version branding an effective strategy in mobilizing Swift's fans to consume the re-recorded album over the original. Writing for The Sydney Morning Herald, Giselle Au Nhien-Nguyen opined that the Taylor's Version projects not only allowed Swift to gain ownership of her music but also gave her fans a chance to reflect on her artistic evolution. Willman wrote that Swift's highly publicized move to reclaim her masters, starting with Fearless (Taylor's Version), would inspire other artists to "further deputize or weaponize fans in their own business disputes". Marie Claire's Kate Dwyer also appreciated it for "divorcing [Swift's] music from the sexist media narrative that followed her during her adolescence", which allowed Swift to control her narrative by "inviting listeners and critics to engage with the same songs today without as much gender bias".

There were minor criticisms, including one from the Los Angeles Times' Mikael Wood, who downplayed the re-recording as an act of "bare-knuckled capitalism". NME's Mark Beaumont said the updated production might alienate some listeners who enjoyed the original album when it was first released, but he remarked that Swift's story and cause behind her re-recording endeavors made it "the right thing" to embrace the Taylor's Version releases.

== Track listing ==
Fearless (Taylor's Version) track listing
No.	Title	Writer(s)	Producer(s)	Length
1.	"Fearless"	Taylor Swift; Liz Rose; Hillary Lindsey	Swift; Christopher Rowe	4:01
2.	"Fifteen"	Swift	Swift; Rowe	4:54
3.	"Love Story"	Swift	Swift; Rowe	3:55
4.	"Hey Stephen"	Swift	Swift; Rowe	4:14
5.	"White Horse"	Swift; Rose	Swift; Rowe	3:54
6.	"You Belong with Me"	Swift; Rose	Swift; Rowe	3:51
7.	"Breathe" (featuring Colbie Caillat)	Swift; Caillat	Swift; Rowe	4:23
8.	"Tell Me Why"	Swift; Rose	Swift; Rowe	3:20
9.	"You're Not Sorry"	Swift	Swift; Rowe	4:21
10.	"The Way I Loved You"	Swift; John Rich	Swift; Rowe	4:03
11.	"Forever & Always"	Swift	Swift; Rowe	3:45
12.	"The Best Day"	Swift	Swift; Rowe	4:05
13.	"Change"	Swift	Swift; Rowe	4:39
14.	"Jump Then Fall"	Swift	Swift; Rowe	3:57
15.	"Untouchable"	Cary Barlowe; Nathan Barlowe; Tommy Lee James; Swift	Swift; Rowe	5:12
16.	"Forever & Always" (piano version)	Swift	Swift; Rowe	4:27
17.	"Come In with the Rain"	Swift; Rose	Swift; Rowe	3:57
18.	"Superstar"	Swift; Rose	Swift; Rowe	4:23
19.	"The Other Side of the Door"	Swift	Swift; Rowe	3:58
20.	"Today Was a Fairytale"	Swift	Swift; Rowe	4:01
21.	"You All Over Me" (featuring Maren Morris)	Swift; Scooter Carusoe	Swift; Aaron Dessner	3:40
22.	"Mr. Perfectly Fine"	Swift	Swift; Jack Antonoff	4:37
23.	"We Were Happy"	Swift; Rose	Swift; Dessner	4:04
24.	"That's When" (featuring Keith Urban)	Swift; Brad Warren; Brett Warren	Swift; Antonoff	3:09
25.	"Don't You"	Swift; James	Swift; Antonoff	3:28
26.	"Bye Bye Baby"	Swift; Rose	Swift; Antonoff	4:02
Total length:				106:20

Physical releases bonus track
No.	Title	Writer(s)	Producer(s)	Length
27.	"Love Story" (Elvira remix)	Swift	Elvira Anderfjärd; Rowe^{[a]}	3:31
Total length:				109:51

=== Notes ===
- ^{^[a]} signifies vocal producer
- On the physical releases, tracks 1–20 and 27 are subtitled "Taylor's Version" and tracks 21–26 are subtitled "From the Vault".
- On digital and streaming platforms, all tracks are subtitled "Taylor's Version" and tracks 21–26 are additionally subtitled "From the Vault".
- The CD packaging contains 2 discs, one including tracks 1–13 and the other 14–27.

== Personnel ==
Credits are adapted from the liner notes of Fearless (Taylor's Version).

=== Musicians ===
- Taylor Swift – lead vocals, songwriting, production (all tracks), background vocals (11, 14–16, 27)
- Mike Meadows – 12-string acoustic guitar (1), acoustic guitar (1–3, 5–8, 10–15, 17–19), background vocals (1, 3–5, 9–11, 17–19), Hammond B3 (1, 4), mandolin (1–3, 6–8, 15, 18–20), banjo (3, 6, 8, 10, 14, 17, 19, 20), finger clicking (4), piano (7, 10), electric guitar (9, 10), synthesizer (13, 16), synthesizer programming (13, 16), dobro (19)
- Caitlin Evanson – background vocals (1–4, 6, 8, 13)
- Paul Sidoti – background vocals (1, 3, 8, 11), electric guitar (1–3, 6, 8, 10, 11, 13, 14, 17–20), piano (5, 9, 10, 16), acoustic guitar (7)
- Amos Heller – bass (1–15, 17–20)
- Matt Billingslea – drums (1–15, 17–20), finger clicking (4), drum programming (6, 11, 14), electronic percussion (19, 20)
- Max Bernstein – electric guitar (1–3, 7, 9–11, 13, 14, 18, 19), vibraphone (4), steel guitar (6, 8, 17), synthesizer (15, 16, 18, 20), synthesizer programming (15, 16, 20), banjo (20), glockenspiel (20)
- Jonathan Yudkin – fiddle (1, 3, 4, 6, 8, 11, 14), cello (2), strings (5, 7, 9, 10, 16, 17)
- Christopher Rowe – production (1–20), background vocals (2, 8, 10, 17, 20), vocal production (27)
- Liz Rose – songwriting (1, 5, 6, 8, 17, 18, 23, 26)
- Hillary Lindsey – songwriting (1)
- Dan Burns – drum programming (6, 11, 14), synthesizer programming (13, 15, 16, 20), electronic percussion (19, 20)
- Colbie Caillat – vocals, songwriting (7)
- Brian Pruitt – drum programming (8)
- John Rich – songwriting (10)
- Cary Barlowe – songwriting (15)
- Nathan Barlowe – songwriting (15)
- Tommy Lee James – songwriting (15, 25)
- Aaron Dessner – production, acoustic guitar, bass, drum programming, electric guitar, keyboards, percussion, synthesizer (21, 23), piano (21)
- Eric Slick – drums (21, 23)
- Josh Kaufman – electric guitar, harmonica (21), acoustic guitar, lap steel guitar (23)
- Maren Morris – vocals (21)
- Scooter Carusoe – songwriting (21)
- Jack Antonoff – production (22, 24–26), acoustic guitar (22, 24), background vocals (22, 25), bass (22, 24, 26), electric guitar (22, 24–26), percussion (22, 24, 26), keyboards (22, 25), programming (22, 25, 26), synthesizer (22), drums (24, 25), synthesizer programming, vocoder (25), piano (26)
- Sean Hutchinson – drums (22, 24, 26)
- Mikey Freedom Hart – electric guitar (22, 24–26), pedal steel (22, 24), 12-string acoustic guitar (22), bass (24, 25), celesta (24), drums (24), Hammond B3 (24), keyboards (24, 25), piano (24, 26), percussion (25, 26), Rhodes (25), Wurlitzer organ (26)
- Michael Riddleberger – percussion (22, 24, 26)
- Evan Smith – saxophone (22, 24, 26), flute (24–26), percussion, electric guitar, synthesizer programming (25)
- Keith Urban – background vocals, electric guitar (23), 12-string acoustic guitar, vocals (24)
- Clarice Jensen – cello (23)
- Brad Warren – songwriting (24)
- Brett Warren – songwriting (24)
- Bobby Hawk – violin (25, 26)
- Elvira Anderfjärd – production, remixing, background vocals, bass, drums, keyboards, programming (27)

=== Technical ===
- Taylor Swift – executive producer
- Randy Merrill – mastering (all tracks)
- Serban Ghenea – mixing (1–20, 22, 24–27)
- John Hanes – engineering (1–20, 22, 24–27)
- Christopher Rowe – vocal engineering (1, 6–26), recording engineering (2, 3)
- David Payne – recording engineering (1–20)
- Sam Holland – vocal engineering (3–5, 27)
- Bella Blasko – engineering, recording engineering (21, 23)
- Aaron Dessner – engineering, recording engineering (21, 23)
- Jonathan Low – mixing, engineering (21, 23)
- Julian Burg – vocal engineering (21)
- Greg Kurstin – vocal engineering (21)
- Jack Antonoff – recording engineering (22, 24–26)
- Laura Sisk – recording engineering (22, 24–26)
- Nick Rowse – vocal engineering (23, 24)
- Jon Gautier – recording engineering (25, 26)
- Mike Williams – recording engineering (25, 26)
- Elvira Anderfjärd – recording engineering (27)
- Lowell Reynolds – additional engineering, assistant recording engineering (1, 4–20)
- Derek Garten – additional engineering (1, 4–20)
- Sean Badum – assistant recording engineering (3)
- John Rooney – assistant recording engineering (24–26)
- Jon Sher – assistant recording engineering (24–26)

== Charts ==
=== Weekly charts ===
Weekly chart performance
Chart (2021)	Peak position
Argentine Albums (CAPIF)	1
Australian Albums (ARIA)	1
Australian Country Albums (ARIA)	1
Belgian Albums (Ultratop Flanders)	3
Belgian Albums (Ultratop Wallonia)	8
Canadian Albums (Billboard)	1
Danish Albums (Hitlisten)	8
Dutch Albums (Album Top 100)	2
Finnish Albums (Suomen virallinen lista)	22
French Albums (SNEP)	26
Greek Albums (IFPI)	25
Hungarian Albums (MAHASZ)	23
Irish Albums (Official Charts)	1
Italian Albums (FIMI)	12
Japanese Albums (Oricon)	13
Japanese Hot Albums (Billboard Japan)	17
Lithuanian Albums (AGATA)	14
New Zealand Albums (RMNZ)	1
Norwegian Albums (VG-lista)	2
Polish Albums (ZPAV)	29
Portuguese Albums (AFP)	2
Scottish Albums (Official Charts)	1
Spanish Albums (Promusicae)	3
Swedish Albums (Sverigetopplistan)	17
UK Albums (Official Charts)	1
UK Country Albums (Official Charts)	1
US Billboard 200	1
US Top Country Albums (Billboard)	1

2024 weekly chart performance
Chart (2024)	Peak position
German Albums (Offizielle Top 100)	45

=== Year-end charts ===
2021 year-end charts
Chart (2021)	Position
Australian Albums (ARIA)	26
Belgian Albums (Ultratop Flanders)	134
Canadian Albums (Billboard)	48
New Zealand Albums (RMNZ)	40
Portuguese Albums (AFP)	68
Spanish Albums (PROMUSICAE)	79
UK Albums (OCC)	92
US Billboard 200	33
US Top Country Albums (Billboard)	5

2022 year-end charts
Chart (2022)	Position
Australian Albums (ARIA)	91
US Billboard 200	126
US Top Country Albums (Billboard)	9

2023 year-end charts
Chart (2023)	Position
Australian Albums (ARIA)	45
Belgian Albums (Ultratop Flanders)	115
US Billboard 200	43
US Top Country Albums (Billboard)	9

2024 year-end charts
Chart (2024)	Position
Australian Albums (ARIA)	57
Australian Country Albums (ARIA)	9
Belgian Albums (Ultratop Flanders)	119
US Billboard 200	81
US Top Country Albums (Billboard)	18

2025 year-end charts
Chart (2025)	Position
US Top Country Albums (Billboard)	45

== Certifications ==
Certifications
Region	Certification	Certified units/sales
Australia (ARIA)	Platinum	70,000^{‡}
Austria (IFPI Austria)	Gold	7,500^{‡}
Canada (Music Canada)	3× Platinum	240,000^{‡}
Denmark (IFPI Danmark)	Gold	10,000^{‡}
France (SNEP)	Platinum	100,000^{‡}
New Zealand (RMNZ)	2× Platinum	30,000^{‡}
Poland (ZPAV)	Gold	10,000^{‡}
Spain (Promusicae)	Gold	20,000^{‡}
United Kingdom (BPI)	Platinum	300,000^{‡}
United States (RIAA)	4× Platinum	4,000,000^{‡}
^{‡} Sales+streaming figures based on certification alone.

== Release history ==
Release dates and formats
Initial release date	Edition(s)	Format(s)	Ref.
April 9, 2021	Standard	Digital download; streaming	
April 9, 2021	Deluxe	CD; cassette; vinyl LP	

== See also ==
- List of Billboard 200 number-one albums of 2021
- List of UK Albums Chart number ones of the 2020s
- List of number-one albums of 2021 (Australia)
- List of number-one albums of 2021 (Canada)
- List of number-one albums of 2021 (Ireland)
- List of number-one albums from the 2020s (New Zealand)
- List of number-one albums of 2021 (Scotland)
