= Jack Antonoff =

American musician (born 1984)

- Antonoff in 2023

Background information
- Born: Jack Michael Antonoff; March 31, 1984 (age 42); Bergenfield, New Jersey, U.S.
- Genres: Pop; rock; alternative rock; indie rock; synth-pop; hip hop
- Occupations: Singer; songwriter; music producer; multi-instrumentalist
- Instruments: Guitar; vocals; drums; keyboards; bass; cello
- Years active: 2000–present
- Labels: RCA; Quality CTRL; Fueled by Ramen; Drive-Thru; Dirty Hit; Bleachers Band
- Member of: Bleachers; Red Hearse
- Formerly of: Fun; Steel Train
- Spouse: Margaret Qualley (m. 2023; sep. 2026)

Jack Michael Antonoff (born March 31, 1984) is an American singer, songwriter, multi-instrumentalist, and music producer. He is the lead vocalist of the rock band Bleachers, and previously the guitarist and drummer for the pop rock band Fun and the lead vocalist of the indie rock band Steel Train. Antonoff has produced and co-written songs with other music acts such as Taylor Swift, Lorde, Lana Del Rey, St. Vincent, Pink, Florence and the Machine, Kendrick Lamar, Sabrina Carpenter, and Doja Cat.

Antonoff has won thirteen Grammy Awards. As part of Fun, he was awarded the Best New Artist and the Song of the Year for "We Are Young" (2011). He gained prominence as a music producer following his works with Swift, leading to three Album of the Year wins from her albums 1989 (2014), Folklore (2020), and Midnights (2022). His other Album of the Year nominations include Lorde's Melodrama (2017), Swift's Evermore (2020) and The Tortured Poets Department (2024); Del Rey's Norman Fucking Rockwell! (2019) and Did You Know That There's a Tunnel Under Ocean Blvd (2023); Carpenter's Short n' Sweet (2024) and Man's Best Friend (2025), and Lamar's GNX (2024).

Having won Producer of the Year three consecutive times from 2022 to 2024, Antonoff has been credited by critics with having influenced the popular music trends of the 2010s and 2020s. Songs he contributed to—from "We Are Young" to Swift's "Look What You Made Me Do" (2017), "Cruel Summer" (2019), "All Too Well (10 Minute Version)" (2021), "Anti-Hero" (2022), "Is It Over Now?" (2023), "Fortnight" (2024), and "I Knew It, I Knew You" (2026); Sabrina Carpenter's "Please Please Please" (2024) and "Manchild" (2025); and Kendrick Lamar's "Squabble Up" and "Luther" (both 2024)—have topped the Billboard Hot 100 chart.

He has curated film soundtracks as well, including One Chance (2014), Fifty Shades Darker (2018), Love, Simon (2018), and Minions: The Rise of Gru (2022); singles from the first two soundtracks, "Sweeter Than Fiction" by Swift and "I Don't Wanna Live Forever" by Swift and Zayn Malik have garnered nominations for the Grammy Award for Best Song Written for Visual Media. He also composed the original song "I Knew It, I Knew You" with Swift for the film Toy Story 5.

== Early life ==
Antonoff was born on March 31, 1984, in Bergenfield, New Jersey. He is the second of three children of Shira (Wall) and Rick Antonoff. He is the younger brother of fashion designer Rachel Antonoff. His younger sister, Sarah, died of brain cancer at the age of 13 when Jack was a senior in high school. According to Antonoff, the event had a profound effect on him, "my whole career has been revisiting that through a different lens." Antonoff is Jewish. He grew up in New Milford, New Jersey, and Woodcliff Lake, New Jersey and attended elementary school at the Solomon Schechter Day School of Bergen County. He and Rachel commuted to Manhattan to attend the Professional Children's School.

During his sophomore year of high school, in November 1998, he and several friends from elementary school formed a punk rock band called Outline. They released a self-titled EP through Lifetime Records, a friend's record label, in January 2000, which was recorded by Jack's childhood friend, Heath Miller of Excess dB Entertainment. Antonoff initially sang in the group until early 2000 when Eddie Wright took over on vocals. With the addition of Wright, they recorded six songs which were later released as 6 Song Demo in the summer. They released an album, A Boy Can Dream, in July 2001 through Triple Crown Records. When they were 15, Antonoff and his Outline bandmate used a DIY guide to book shows in numerous states, including Florida and Texas, and borrowed Antonoff's parents' minivan to travel in. During the tour, Outline played in venues such as anarchist bookstores, while the oldest member of the band drove because he was 18 years old. Antonoff explained in 2014: "Half the time no one would show up or the equipment would be too fucked up to play... but that's when I fell in love with touring." The band lasted until 2002, when Steel Train would sign to Drive-Thru Records.

== Music career ==
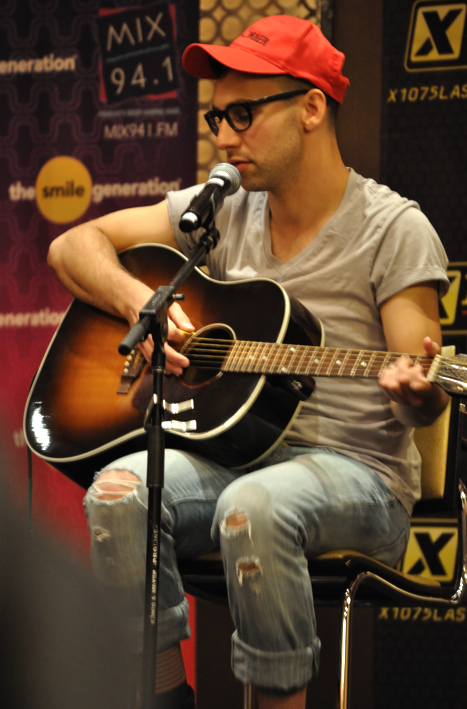
Antonoff performing for X107-5 in August 2012

=== Steel Train and Fun. (2001–2015) ===
In summer of 2001, Antonoff and friend Scott Irby-Ranniar formed the band Steel Train, playing their first ever show at Club Krome in South Amboy, NJ on September 15, along with future labelmates Allister and The Early November, who were about to sign to Drive-Thru Records. Antonoff was the lead singer, and they recruited drummer Matthias Gruber. The band then convinced two of their friends from the band Random Task (at the time managed by Heath Miller, promoter of Club Krome at Excess dB Entertainment), Evan Winiker and Matthew Goldman, to drop out of college to join the new band. Steel Train secured a recording deal with Drive-Thru Records. The group was popular on the jamband festival circuit and Antonoff has said he has applied that grassroots mentality to his future projects.

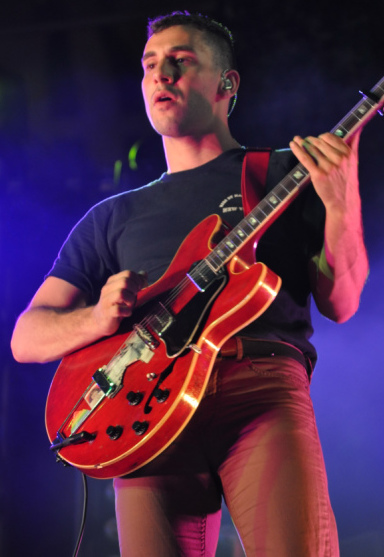
Antonoff in 2012

In 2008, Nate Ruess (formerly the frontman of the Format) asked Antonoff to join him and Andrew Dost (formerly of Anathallo) in a new band, which became Fun. Antonoff was already well acquainted with Ruess and Dost, as their former bands had all toured together, meeting at a show at Club Krome on June 11, 2003. The new band released its debut album, Aim and Ignite, in 2009. Fun's second album, Some Nights (2012), produced the band's first number-one hit single, "We Are Young". The song was co-written by Antonoff with Ruess, Dost, and Jeff Bhasker. Fun. then played with their musical heroes Queen in September 2013 at the iHeartRadio Music Festival, which was held at the MGM Grand Garden Arena in Las Vegas. Antonoff played Brian May's guitar during the rehearsal, which he described as the "most surreal experience ever." The band then released a free six-song EP in December 2013, titled Before Shane Went to Bangkok: Fun. Live in the USA.

=== Bleachers (2014–present) ===
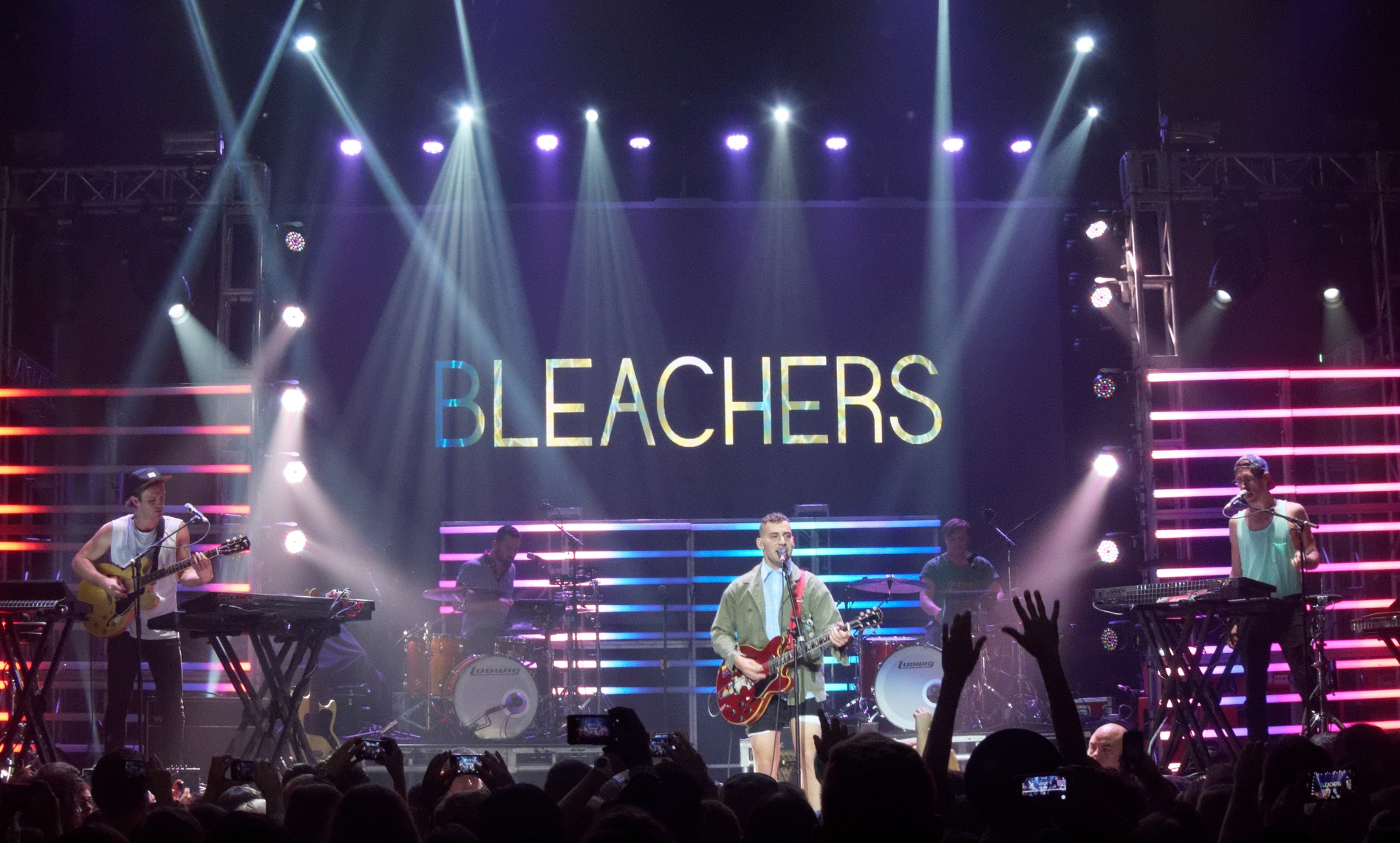
Antonoff performing as an "Artist to Watch" at the MTV Video Music Awards as Bleachers in August 2014

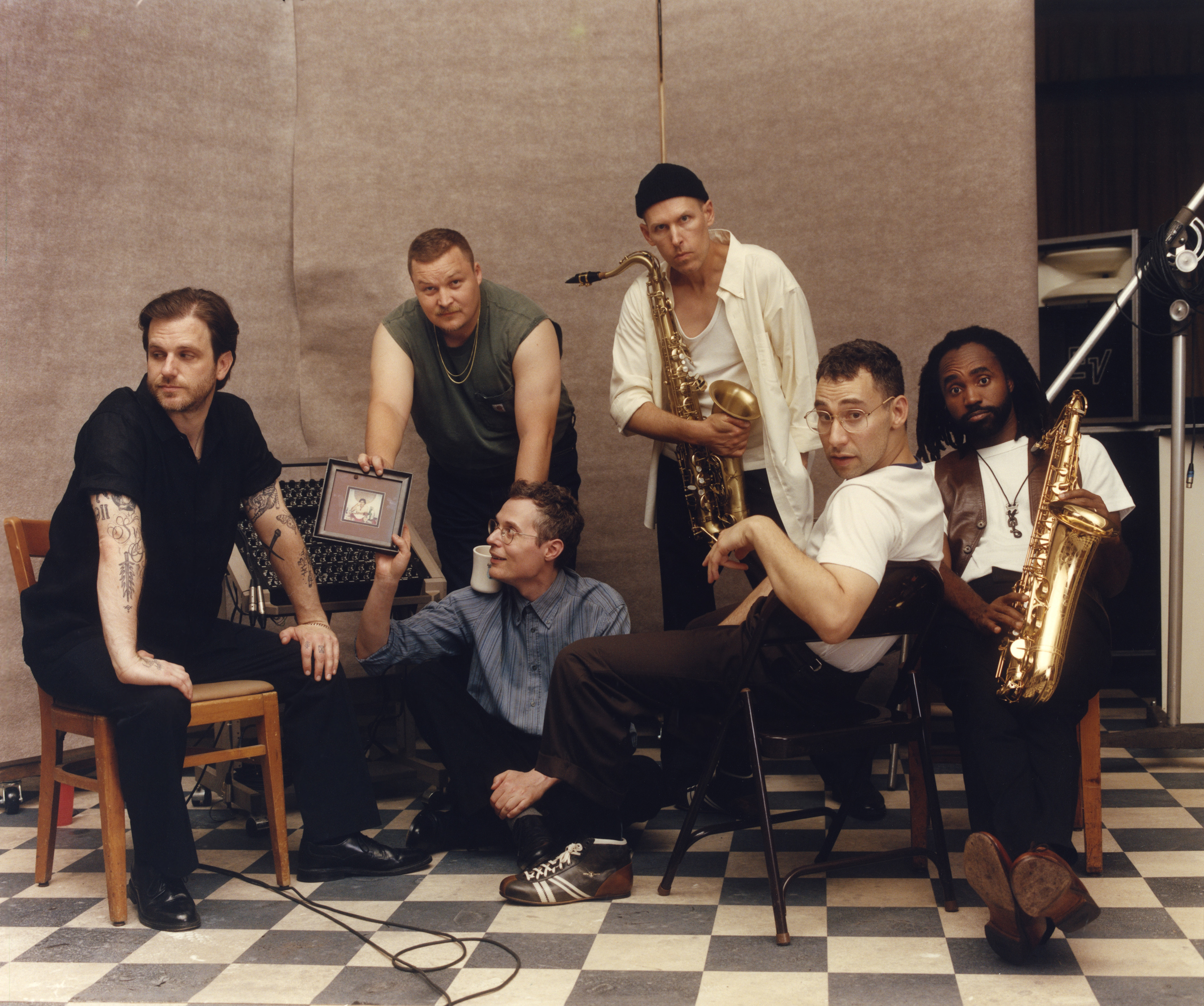
Bleachers on set for their "Modern Girl" music video, August 2023

Antonoff announced a solo project called Bleachers in February 2014. Antonoff stated in June 2014 that the project had been a consideration for around 10 years, and the name was inspired by the "disconnected, darker side" of suburban youth and John Hughes movies, which were "tied to a time when big songs were great songs." The songs for the debut Bleachers album were mostly written on Antonoff's laptop computer in hotel rooms during a Fun. world tour.

The Huffington Post published a positive review of Bleachers' first single, "I Wanna Get Better"—released on February 18—calling it the "catchiest song of 2014", while Time proclaimed, "[Bleachers] is more fun than Fun." Antonoff revealed the intent behind the debut single in a Rolling Stone interview:

I wanted to bridge the gap between Disclosure and Arcade Fire—something both streamlined and organic... The production and songwriting is extremely over-the-top, extremely epic and unapologetic. The record is all about finding a world where you can be kind to yourself in.

Antonoff told Rolling Stone that while the song may sound joyous, "it's very desperate" and, like many of the other songs on the album is about loss. Antonoff worked with producers John Hill and Vince Clarke on the Bleachers studio album, as he sought to create "massive, beautiful pop songs that sound fuckin' cool." The completed album, Strange Desire, was released in July 2014, and "I Wanna Get Better" peaked at number one on the U.S. Alternative charts during the same week. In regard to Strange Desire, Antonoff said:

It doesn't have to be one or the other... You don't have to [make] big pop songs that sound stupid and you don't have to make these fuckin' apologetic, tired droney songs that sound incredible. I really wanted both things to happen.

"I Wanna Get Better" was eventually named number 18 in Rolling Stone's 50 Best Songs of 2014, with the publication describing the song as "therapy rock" that is "as fun as it is cathartic". Antonoff released Bleachers' second album Gone Now on June 2, 2017. Its lead single "Don't Take the Money" peaked at number 2 on Alternative Radio. On July 30, 2021, he released Take The Sadness Out Of Saturday Night. Bleachers' self-titled fourth studio album was released on March 8, 2024, being preceded by the release of four singles: "Modern Girl", "Alma Mater", "Tiny Moves", and "Me Before You".

=== Taylor Swift ===
In 2013, Antonoff wrote and produced the song "Sweeter than Fiction" with American singer-songwriter Taylor Swift, for the film One Chance. The song was written in Antonoff's New York City apartment after he and Swift shared a love of a particular snare drum sound from a Fine Young Cannibals song. They brainstormed ideas by email before starting the songwriting process.

Swift and Antonoff wrote and produced three songs together on Swift's fifth studio album, 1989, including the single "Out of the Woods", as well as "I Wish You Would", and the bonus track "You Are in Love". 1989 was released in October 2014 and became the biggest-selling album in the U.S. that year. On the deluxe version of the album, Swift explains in a voice memo that the song "I Wish You Would" originated from a guitar track that Antonoff had recorded on his smartphone. After Swift first heard it, she asked Antonoff if she could develop the idea further, and it eventually became an album track. The album won Antonoff two Grammy Awards for Album of the Year and Best Pop Vocal Album in 2016.

In 2016, Swift, Antonoff, and Sam Dew wrote Swift and Zayn's song "I Don't Wanna Live Forever", with Antonoff producing, for the film Fifty Shades Darker. The track appears on the Fifty Shades Darker: Original Motion Picture Soundtrack. The duo wrote and produced the number-one single "Look What You Made Me Do" as well, which was released on August 25, 2017. Antonoff was a key contributor to Swift's sixth studio album, Reputation. Aside from "Look What You Made Me Do", Swift and Antonoff also wrote and produced five other songs together on Reputation—"Getaway Car", "Dress", "This Is Why We Can't Have Nice Things", "Call It What You Want", and "New Year's Day".

Taylor's the first person who let me produce a song. Before Taylor, everyone said: 'You're not a producer'. It took Taylor Swift to say: 'I like the way this sounds.'

— Antonoff, "Jack Antonoff Is Only Making Music With Friends", The New York Times

In 2019, Swift and Antonoff wrote eight songs and produced eleven tracks together for Swift's seventh studio album, Lover, including the promotional single "The Archer", the title track, which served as the album's third single, and the number-one single "Cruel Summer".

In 2020, Swift and Antonoff worked together on Swift's eighth studio album, Folklore. Along with Aaron Dessner and Swift, Antonoff serves as one of the songwriters and producers for the album, with Antonoff helping to co-produce six songs and co-write four, including the third single, "Betty". Antonoff continued to collaborate with Swift on Folklore's "sister album", which is Swift's ninth studio album, Evermore, in which he co-wrote the tracks "Gold Rush" and "Ivy", and co-produced the former. Both projects earned a Grammy nomination for Album of the Year, with Folklore winning the award.

Antonoff worked with Swift on her re-recorded albums, co-producing most of the "From the Vault" tracks that were not included on the original albums. In 2021, Swift and Antonoff produced four tracks on Fearless (Taylor's Version): "Mr. Perfectly Fine", "That's When", "Don't You", and "Bye Bye Baby". Swift and Antonoff also produced three tracks on Red (Taylor's Version) (2021): "Babe (Taylor's Version)", "Forever Winter", and the number-one song "All Too Well (10 Minute Version)". On Speak Now (Taylor's Version) (2023), Swift and Antonoff produced the tracks "I Can See You", "Castles Crumbling" and "Timeless". Later in the year Swift and Antonoff also produced every vault track for 1989 (Taylor's Version), and produced the tracks they originally produced on 1989 (2014).

Antonoff co-produced all tracks from the standard edition of Swift's 2022 album Midnights and co-wrote eleven of the thirteen standard tracks, including the number-one single "Anti-Hero" and "Bejeweled", in which he appeared in the music video for the track. He co-wrote six songs and co-produced seven songs on Til Dawn Edition of Midnights and co-wrote and co-produced "You're Losing Me". Midnights was a commercial success across all consumption metrics: streaming, digital sales, and physical sales. It was the biggest-selling album in the U.S. that year. The album won Antonoff two Grammy Awards for Album of the Year and Best Pop Vocal Album in 2024.

Antonoff was one of the songwriters and producers on Swift's 2024 album The Tortured Poets Department, co-writing ten songs and co-producing sixteen songs across the album's standard and double album editions, including the number-one single "Fortnight". The album broke numerous consumption records, leading publications to opine that it "cemented Swift as the biggest pop star this century by many metrics" and became the longest-leading chart topper of her career.

In June 2026, Swift announced "I Knew It, I Knew You", an original song for Toy Story 5 that Antonoff produced and wrote with the artist. The single marks their first collaboration together since the record-breaking The Tortured Poets Department in 2024.

=== Lorde ===
In 2017, Antonoff co-wrote and produced Lorde's Melodrama which was released in June. USA Today described it as "the best pop album of 2017 so far". Rolling Stone praised Antonoff's production specifically, noting his use of "empty space to spectacular effect, [as] the arrangements veer from stark clarity to delirium." In support of the album, Antonoff appeared in the music video for its lead single, "Green Light". He then performed "Liability" alongside Lorde on Saturday Night Live. The album also received a nomination for the 2018 Grammy Award for Album of the Year. Beginning from 2018 until 2021, Antonoff co-wrote, produced, and performed on Lorde's third album Solar Power. However, Antonoff did not participate on Lorde's 2025 album Virgin. In a Rolling Stone interview, she said she is "very vibes-based" and that she "just has to trust when my intuition says to keep moving."

=== Love, Simon ===
In 2018, Antonoff produced the soundtrack for the 20th Century Fox romantic comedy-drama film Love, Simon. Bleachers also contributed four songs. On working on the ground-breaking film, the first major studio picture to focus on a gay teenager, Antonoff said "I believe Love, Simon is pivotal, a major step for a new generation" and added that he was "honored" that "genius" director Greg Berlanti asked him to work on the soundtrack. He also said he was "very lucky to be a part of [Love, Simon]" and "loved every moment of making this soundtrack" after stating he was "beyond blown away" by the response to the film and soundtrack.

=== Red Hearse ===
On June 26, 2019, Antonoff previewed a new musical project with Sam Dew and Sounwave called Red Hearse. The project was teased with the release of two singles, "Red Hearse" and "Honey". On July 22, 2019, Red Hearse made their television debut on The Tonight Show Starring Jimmy Fallon, performing "Half Love". Their debut self-titled studio album was released on August 16, 2019, via RCA Records.

=== Lana Del Rey ===
Antonoff co-produced Lana Del Rey's sixth studio album Norman Fucking Rockwell!, which was released on August 30, 2019. He also co-wrote a majority of the songs on the album including the singles "Mariners Apartment Complex" and "Venice Bitch". The album received critical praise with NME's Rhian Daly noting that the "bohemian folk" sound of the record was a departure from Antonoff's "brand of crystalline euphoria." Other critics noted the album's 60s inspired, psychedelic rock sound. The album was nominated for Grammy Album of the Year and won NME Album of the Year in 2020. Antonoff also produced Del Rey's subsequent albums Chemtrails Over the Country Club in 2021 and Did You Know That There's a Tunnel Under Ocean Blvd in 2023, the latter including the duet "Margaret" which Del Rey wrote about Antonoff's then wife.

=== Shadow of the City Festival ===
In 2015, Antonoff started his own music festival called Shadow of the City, which raises funding for The Ally Coalition. Antonoff told Rolling Stone he wanted to start the festival because, "I grew up in New Jersey and lived there for 28 years. New Jersey is part of who I am. I've always thought that it's the perfect place for a festival." In an interview published in the book New Jersey Fan Club, Antonoff says he wants to bring his audience closer to New Jersey as it really is.

The first festival, held on September 19, 2015 at The Stone Pony in Asbury Park, NJ, featured Charli XCX, Vic Mensa, the Front Bottoms, MisterWives, Cults, How to Dress Well and Robert Delong, with Bleachers headlining. Subsequent festivals included the artists Carly Rae Jepsen, The 1975, Brian Fallon, Khalid, Titus Andronicus, Nicole Atkins, Hayley Kiyoko, Julien Baker, Japanese Breakfast, and others.

=== Other projects ===
Antonoff co-wrote "Brave" with Sara Bareilles after the two were introduced by Sara Quin of the band Tegan and Sara. Bareilles said to Billboard: "We met for breakfast one day, and I was just so enamored with him and his personality ... The first day we sat down together was the day we wrote 'Brave'." Antonoff wrote the song about a friend's struggle to speak openly about his sexuality. The quickly written song was released on April 23, 2013 and by the end of June, "Brave" had sold 160,000 digital copies and peaked at number 61 on the Billboard Hot 100 chart.

He founded The Ally Coalition circa 2014 with his sister, Rachel Antonoff. It hosts an annual benefits concert, called "The Talent Show", which has raised more than $2 million to support LGBT issues. In 2015, he created a Google Play docuseries titled Thank You and Sorry, which combined scripted scenes and footage from Bleachers shows. It was released in six 15-minute episodes and included cameos from Lena Dunham, Rosie Perez, Olivia Wilde, Colin Quinn, and Jason Mantzoukas. Also in 2015, Antonoff portrayed the character Baby Goya in the comedy-drama film Hello, My Name Is Doris.

In 2017, he contributed to the production of Pink's seventh studio album, Beautiful Trauma, and produced St. Vincent's fifth studio album, Masseduction. In early 2019, he handled production on Brockhampton frontman Kevin Abstract's solo album, Arizona Baby. Antonoff appeared in the 2021 documentary The Sparks Brothers, talking about his admiration for the band Sparks. The same year, he contributed to St. Vincent's sixth studio album, Daddy's Home, and Clairo's sophomore record, Sling.

In 2022, Antonoff produced eight tracks off Florence and the Machine's fifth studio album, Dance Fever. His credits on the album include the singles "King" and "Free". He also co-produced the 1975's fifth studio album, Being Funny in a Foreign Language, and the soundtrack for the animated film, Minions: The Rise of Gru. In 2023, he started his own record label in collaboration with Jamie Oborne. The record label, called Shadow of the City, is an imprint of Oborne's label, called Dirty Hit. That year, he co-produced Rob Grant's debut studio album, Lost at Sea, including the single "Hollywood Bowl" which features Grant's daughter, Lana Del Rey.

In 2024, Antonoff produced the soundtrack for the Apple TV+ series The New Look. He co-wrote and produced five tracks on Sabrina Carpenter's sixth studio album Short n' Sweet, including her first number-one single "Please Please Please". Antonoff produced a remix version of Paramore's track "Sanity", Kendrick Lamar's diss track "6:16 in LA", and Gracie Abrams's track "Us" featuring Taylor Swift. In late 2024, Antonoff co-wrote and produced 11 out of 12 tracks from Lamar's sixth studio album GNX, including the number-one singles "Squabble Up" and "Luther". In 2025, Antonoff also co-wrote and co-produced the majority of Carpenter's seventh studio album Man's Best Friend alongside Carpenter and John Ryan.

== Accolades ==
Awards and nominations received by Jack Antonoff
| Award | Year | Nominated work | Category | Result | Ref. |
|---|---|---|---|---|---|
| Golden Globe Awards | 2014 | "Sweeter than Fiction" | Best Original Song | Nominated | |
| Gracie Awards | 2021 | Folklore: The Long Pond Studio Sessions | Grand Award for Special or Variety | Won | |
| Grammy Awards | 2013 | Fun | Best New Artist | Won | |
| Grammy Awards | 2013 | "We Are Young" | Record of the Year | Nominated | |
| Grammy Awards | 2013 | "We Are Young" | Song of the Year | Won | |
| Grammy Awards | 2013 | "We Are Young" | Best Pop Duo/Group Performance | Nominated | |
| Grammy Awards | 2013 | Some Nights | Best Pop Vocal Album | Nominated | |
| Grammy Awards | 2013 | Some Nights | Album of the Year | Nominated | |
| Grammy Awards | 2016 | 1989 | Album of the Year | Won | |
| Grammy Awards | 2018 | Melodrama | Album of the Year | Nominated | |
| Grammy Awards | 2018 | "I Don't Wanna Live Forever" | Best Song Written for Visual Media | Nominated | |
| Grammy Awards | 2019 | Masseduction | Best Alternative Music Album | Nominated | |
| Grammy Awards | 2019 | "Masseduction" | Best Rock Song | Won | |
| Grammy Awards | 2020 | Norman Fucking Rockwell! | Album of the Year | Nominated | |
| Grammy Awards | 2020 | "Norman Fucking Rockwell" | Song of the Year | Nominated | |
| Grammy Awards | 2020 | Himself | Producer of the Year, Non-Classical | Nominated | |
| Grammy Awards | 2021 | Himself | Producer of the Year, Non-Classical | Nominated | |
| Grammy Awards | 2021 | Folklore | Album of the Year | Won | |
| Grammy Awards | 2022 | Evermore | Album of the Year | Nominated | |
| Grammy Awards | 2022 | Daddy's Home | Best Alternative Music Album | Won | |
| Grammy Awards | 2022 | Himself | Producer of the Year, Non-Classical | Won | |
| Grammy Awards | 2023 | Himself | Producer of the Year, Non-Classical | Won | |
| Grammy Awards | 2024 | Himself | Producer of the Year, Non-Classical | Won | |
| Grammy Awards | 2024 | Midnights | Best Pop Vocal Album | Won | |
| Grammy Awards | 2024 | Midnights | Album of the Year | Won | |
| Grammy Awards | 2024 | Did You Know That There's a Tunnel Under Ocean Blvd | Album of the Year | Nominated | |
| Grammy Awards | 2024 | "Anti-Hero" | Record of the Year | Nominated | |
| Grammy Awards | 2024 | "Anti-Hero" | Song of the Year | Nominated | |
| Grammy Awards | 2024 | "A&W" | Song of the Year | Nominated | |
| Grammy Awards | 2025 | "Please Please Please" | Song of the Year | Nominated | |
| Grammy Awards | 2025 | "Fortnight" | Song of the Year | Nominated | |
| Grammy Awards | 2025 | "Fortnight" | Record of the Year | Nominated | |
| Grammy Awards | 2025 | The Tortured Poets Department | Album of the Year | Nominated | |
| Grammy Awards | 2025 | Short n' Sweet | Album of the Year | Nominated | |
| Grammy Awards | 2025 | Short n' Sweet | Best Engineered Album, Non-Classical | Nominated | |
| Grammy Awards | 2026 | "Luther" | Record of the Year | Won | |
| Grammy Awards | 2026 | "Luther" | Song of the Year | Nominated | |
| Grammy Awards | 2026 | "Manchild" | Song of the Year | Nominated | |
| Grammy Awards | 2026 | "Manchild" | Record of the Year | Nominated | |
| Grammy Awards | 2026 | Man's Best Friend | Album of the Year | Nominated | |
| Grammy Awards | 2026 | GNX | Album of the Year | Nominated | |
| Grammy Awards | 2026 | "TV Off" | Best Rap Song | Won | |
| Grammy Awards | 2027 | Lost Weekend | Album of the Year | Pending | |
| Grammy Awards | 2027 | "I Knew It, I Knew You" | Song of the Year | Pending | |
| Grammy Awards | 2027 | "I Knew It, I Knew You" | Best Song Written for Visual Media | Pending | |
| Ivor Novello Awards | 2023 | "King" | Best song musically and lyrically | Won | |
| NME Awards | 2022 | Himself | Songwriter Award | Won | |
| Satellite Awards | 2018 | "I Don't Wanna Live Forever" | Best Original Song | Nominated | |
| Satellite Awards | 2019 | "Strawberries & Cigarettes" | Best Original Song | Nominated | |

== Personal life ==
Antonoff dated classmate Scarlett Johansson from 2001 to 2002. When Antonoff first moved out of the family home near the end of 2012, he lived with his sister Rachel in New York City. Afterward, he lived with Lena Dunham, whom he was dating at the time. The couple separated in December 2017. As of December 2019, he lived in the same New York apartment he shared with Dunham where he had a home studio. In 2023, Antonoff married actress Margaret Qualley, after dating for a couple of years. They separated in July 2026 and filed a joint petition for divorce in October, after three years of marriage.

Antonoff has spoken publicly about his struggles with depression, anxiety, and obsessive–compulsive disorder (OCD). He said that hearing of others' battles with depression made him feel "not better, but not alone" and "way less scared". In June 2014, Antonoff said in an interview that he was seeing both a therapist and a psychopharmacologist, while also taking anti-anxiety medications. He has germophobia, which was exacerbated by a bout of pneumonia that he suffered in 2011 while recording a studio album for his band Fun.

== Discography ==
Outline

- Outline (2000)
- 6 Song Demo (2000)
- A Boy Can Dream (2001)

Steel Train

- For You My Dear (2003)
- Twilight Tales from the Prairies of the Sun (2005)
- Trampoline (2007)
- Steel Train Is Here (2009)
- Steel Train (2010)

Fun.

- Aim and Ignite (2009)
- Some Nights (2012)

Bleachers

- Strange Desire (2014)
- Gone Now (2017)
- Take the Sadness Out of Saturday Night (2021)
- Bleachers (2024)
- Everyone for Ten Minutes (2026)

Red Hearse

- Red Hearse (2019)

Soundtracks

- One Chance (2013)
- Fifty Shades Darker: Original Motion Picture Soundtrack (2017)
- Love, Simon (2018)
- Minions: The Rise of Gru (2022)
- The New Look (2024)

As producer

- Carly Rae Jepsen – Dedicated (2019), Dedicated Side B (2020)
- The Chicks – Gaslighter (2020)
- Clairo – Sling (2021)
- Doja Cat – Vie (2025)
- Florence and the Machine – Dance Fever (2022)
- Gracie Abrams – The Secret of Us (2024)
- Kendrick Lamar – GNX (2024)
- Kevin Abstract – Arizona Baby (2019)
- Lana Del Rey – Norman Fucking Rockwell! (2019), Violet Bent Backwards over the Grass (2020), Chemtrails over the Country Club (2021), Did You Know That There's a Tunnel Under Ocean Blvd (2023), Stove (2026)
- Lorde – Melodrama (2017), Solar Power (2021)
- St. Vincent – Masseduction (2017), Daddy's Home (2021)
- Sabrina Carpenter – Short n' Sweet (2024), Man's Best Friend (2025)
- Taylor Swift – 1989 (2014), Reputation (2017), Lover (2019), Folklore (2020), Evermore (2020), Fearless (Taylor's Version) (2021), Red (Taylor's Version) (2021), Midnights (2022), Speak Now (Taylor's Version) (2023), 1989 (Taylor's Version) (2023), The Tortured Poets Department (2024)
- The 1975 – Being Funny in a Foreign Language (2022)

== See also ==
- List of people from New Jersey
- Music of New Jersey
- Music production
