= Heath Miller (promoter) =

American concert promoter and talent buyer

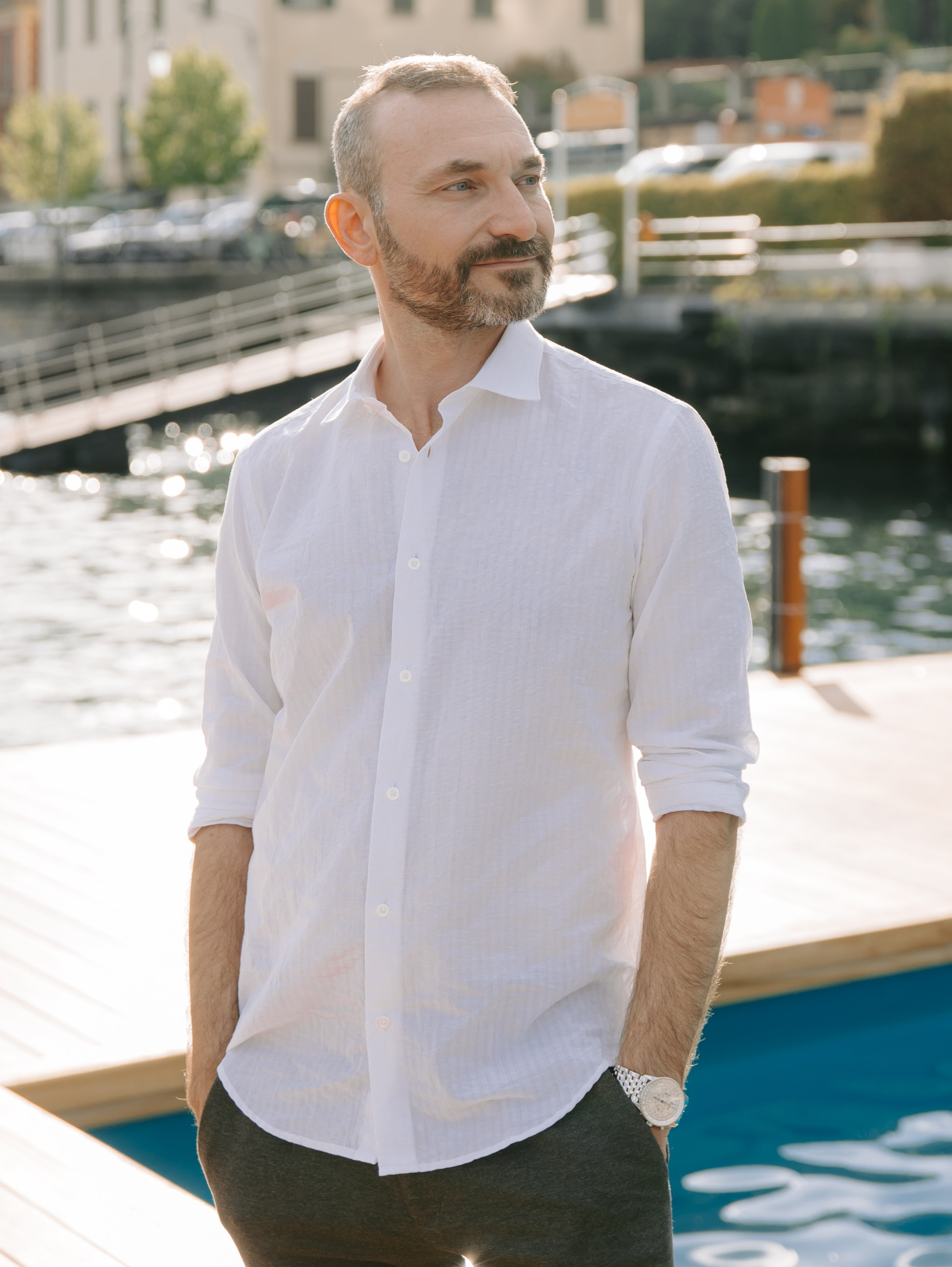
- Occupation: Concert promoter
- Website: heathsmiller.com

Heath Miller is an American concert promoter and talent buyer who founded Excess dB Entertainment and served as vice president and head talent buyer at Webster Hall in New York City from 2011 to 2017. Miller has also managed bands including Senses Fail, Boys Night Out, and Halifax in the 2000s. He owns the Coral View Beach Resort on Utila, Honduras, which hosted the Fyre Coral View Pop-Up and PHNX Festival (formerly Fyre Festival II) in late 2025.

== Career ==
=== Booking and management ===
Miller began his career in the punk and hardcore scene in New Jersey in the late 1990s as a live sound engineer and promoter. At age 17, he booked and promoted a Dropkick Murphys show at the Teaneck American Legion. In 1999, he founded Excess dB Entertainment, which produced concerts at venues in New Jersey and New York City.

Alternative Press credited Miller with booking the first New York City shows for My Chemical Romance and Fall Out Boy.

In July 2004, Miller booked the bands for Hellfest 2004 at the RexPlex in Elizabeth, New Jersey. The three-day festival featured more than 150 bands performing across three stages, including the Misfits, the Ataris, Converge, and the Dillinger Escape Plan. Contemporary reporting in The News-Times identified Miller and Excess dB Entertainment as responsible for booking the performers.

Alongside concert promotion, Miller worked in artist management during the 2000s. His first management client was the New Jersey band Random Task, whose members included future Steel Train bassist Evan Winiker. He subsequently managed Senses Fail, Boys Night Out, and Halifax. Miller later left artist management to concentrate on concert promotion.

Miller also worked with musician Jack Antonoff during his early career, recording demos for Outline, Antonoff's first band. He later booked performances involving Antonoff's projects Steel Train, Fun, and Bleachers.

Miller joined Webster Hall in 2011 to book The Studio at Webster Hall, a smaller room within the venue, and was eventually promoted to vice president and head talent buyer. In 2014, Webster Hall ended its exclusive booking arrangement with the Bowery Presents and brought concert booking in-house, with Miller overseeing its concert programming.

During his tenure, Webster Hall presented concerts by artists including Nine Inch Nails, Muse, LCD Soundsystem, Metallica, Green Day, and The Smashing Pumpkins.

Webster Hall received the Nightclub of the Year award at the 2017 Pollstar Concert Industry Awards. In a March 2017 executive profile, Music Connection credited Miller's talent bookings with contributing to the venue's recognition.

A March 2017 article in Inc. reported that Webster Hall had risen from 11th to third worldwide in Pollstar's club ticket-sales rankings during Miller's tenure booking the venue's Grand Ballroom, reaching first place among New York City venues. The article also examined Miller's approach to concert promotion, artist development, and evaluating prospective bookings.

Miller also oversaw the Ally Coalition's "Talent Show" at Webster Hall, a charity event organized by Jack Antonoff.

Following Webster Hall's sale and closure for renovation in 2017, Miller became the exclusive talent buyer for White Eagle Hall in Jersey City. Through Excess dB Entertainment, he also booked concerts at venues including Stage 48, Highline Ballroom, Le Poisson Rouge, and the Grand Ballroom at Manhattan Center. In 2019, Miller became director of booking at the United Palace in Manhattan.

=== Fyre ===
Miller owns the Coral View Beach Resort on Utila, Honduras, a property his family acquired in the 1990s. He took over operations of the hotel following the COVID-19 pandemic.

In 2025, Miller partnered with businessman Billy McFarland to host events under the "Fyre" brand at the resort. After plans for a large-scale "Fyre Festival II" in Mexico were cancelled, Miller and McFarland pivoted to a smaller "pop-up" concept. The resort hosted the Fyre Coral View Pop-Up in September 2025, followed by the PHNX Festival (formerly Fyre Festival II) on the weekend of December 5, 2025.

== Nonprofit ==
Miller is the founding director of Support Utila, a nonprofit organization focused on development, infrastructure, and preservation on Utila, Honduras.

Miller has also served on the James Beard Foundation Young Professionals Committee and is a member of the "Leaders on the Horizon" associate board of Safe Horizon, an organization supporting survivors of violence, abuse, and exploitation. Safe Horizon lists Miller as having joined the associate board in 2013.
