= You All Over Me =

2021 song by Taylor Swift featuring Maren Morris

Promotional single by Taylor Swift featuring Maren Morris

from the album Fearless (Taylor's Version)
- Written: 2008
- Released: March 26, 2021
- Studio: Long Pond (Hudson Valley)
- Genre: Americana; country pop; roots rock
- Length: 3:40
- Label: Republic
- Songwriters: Taylor Swift; Scooter Carusoe
- Producers: Taylor Swift; Aaron Dessner

Lyric video
- "You All Over Me" on YouTube

"You All Over Me" (Note: Subtitled as "(From the Vault)".) is a song by the American singer-songwriter Taylor Swift from her first re-recorded album, Fearless (Taylor's Version) (2021). Featuring Maren Morris, it is one of the album's "From the Vault" tracks that were intended for but excluded from Swift's second studio album, Fearless (2008). Swift wrote the song with Scooter Carusoe in 2008 and produced it with Aaron Dessner. A ballad that combines Americana, country pop, and roots rock, "You All Over Me" has an acoustic and midtempo production. In the lyrics, a narrator is ruminating on a past romance that she cannot move on from but ultimately accepts what happened.

Before the album's release, "You All Over Me" was issued for download via Swift's website on March 26, 2021. The song peaked at number 35 on the Billboard Global 200 chart and reached those of Australia, Canada, Ireland, the United Kingdom, and the United States. It was met with generally positive reviews from critics, who discussed the similarity to Fearless and praised the songwriting, production, and both artists' performances. Swift performed "You All Over Me" with Morris during a Chicago concert as part of her Eras Tour (2023–2024).

== Background and release ==
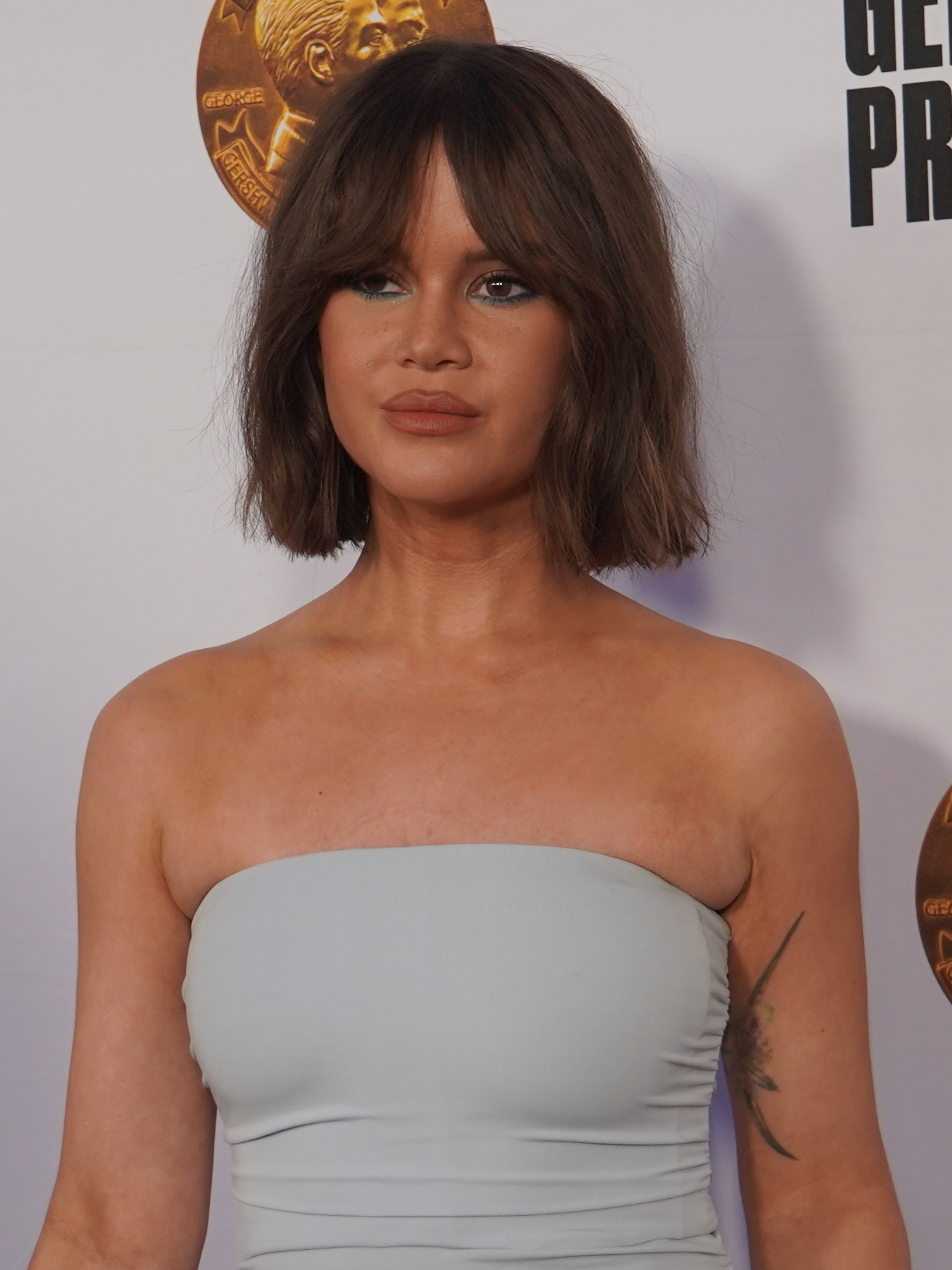
Maren Morris featured on "You All Over Me".

After signing a new contract with Republic Records, Taylor Swift began re-recording her first six studio albums in November 2020. The decision followed a public dispute in 2019 between Swift and the talent manager Scooter Braun, who acquired Big Machine Records, including the masters of her albums which the label had released. By re-recording the albums, Swift had full ownership of the new masters, which enabled her to control the licensing of her songs for commercial use and therefore substituted the Big Machine–owned masters.

On February 11, 2021, Swift announced the first of her re-recorded albums, Fearless (Taylor's Version), a re-recording of her second studio album Fearless (2008). In addition to re-recordings of the original album's tracks, Fearless (Taylor's Version) contained six "From the Vault" tracks which were songs written for the original that did not make the final cut. Swift explained that these tracks were left out of Fearless for various reasons, and that including them on the re-recorded album proved that "the artist is the only one who really knows that body of work". The following day, she released "Love Story (Taylor's Version)", a re-recording of the album's lead single.

On March 24, 2021, Swift announced the first "From the Vault" track from Fearless (Taylor's Version), titled "You All Over Me". She wrote the song with Scooter Carusoe in 2008, and a demo recording of it had previously been leaked online in 2017. Swift subsequently revealed that the American singer Maren Morris would be featuring background vocals on the song. According to her post on social media, the reason she chose Morris was to "experiment, play, and even include some of my favorite artists".

On March 25, 2021, a snippet of "You All Over Me" was played on Good Morning America. It was released for limited-time download via Swift's website the next day. The song is listed as track 21 on the album, which came out on April 9, 2021. On May 26, it was included on the streaming compilation, Fearless (Taylor's Version): The From the Vault Chapter, which features the five other "From the Vault" songs from the album. On June 3, 2023, Swift sang "You All Over Me" with Morris on acoustic guitars during the Chicago stop of her Eras Tour (2023–2024).

== Composition and lyrics ==
"You All Over Me" is 3 minutes and 40 seconds long. Swift produced the song with Aaron Dessner, who recorded it with Bella Blasko at Long Pond Studios in Hudson Valley. Christopher Rowe recorded Swift's vocals at Kitty Committee Studio in London and Greg Kurstin and Julian Burg recorded Morris' vocals at No Expectations Studios in Los Angeles. Dessner engineered the track with Blasko and Jonathan Low. He also provided drum machine programming and instruments including acoustic, bass, electric, and high string guitars, keyboards, piano, percussion, and synthesizers. Other musicians on the song are Jonathan Kaufman (electric guitar, harmonica) and Eric Stick (drums). It was mixed by Serban Ghenea at MixStar Studios in Virginia Beach and mastered by Randy Merrill at Sterling Sound in Edgewater.

"You All Over Me"
The chorus of "You All Over Me" (sampled) presents Swift's voice and Morris' low harmony overlapping above a production blending Americana, country pop and roots rock.

"You All Over Me" is a ballad combining genres of Americana, country pop and roots rock. With an acoustic and midtempo production, its instrumentation features fiddles, mandolin, chiming guitars, looping synth drums, and subdued percussion. (Note: As described by Ross Horton of The Line of Best Fit, Hannah Mylrea of NME, Jonathan Bernstein of Rolling Stone, and Billy Dukes of Taste of Country) The song includes electric guitar riffs that NME's Hannah Mylrea described as "warm" and "understated". Its opening was identified by critics to either be plucked strings or a subtle synth line. Swift's voice on the track contains twang and Morris accompanies her in the chorus with low harmony vocals. Mylrea thought the "crisp drum lines" and Morris' vocals respectively recalled those of the fellow album tracks "Come In with the Rain" and "Forever & Always". She also opined that the production has major influences from Swift's 2020 albums Folklore and Evermore. Jon Freeman from Rolling Stone commented that it had an atmosphere "full of swirling". The A.V. Club's Saloni Gajjar felt that the song would have fit within the original album because of its music that combines country and pop. For Variety, Chris Willman believed that it was courtesy of Nathan Chapman.

As with much of the previously released tracks from Fearless, "You All Over Me" has lyrics about a story told from the perspective of a teenage girl and sharing the lessons she has learned. It is about the narrator's contemplation over a faded romance and details her inability to move on. She is constantly being reeled back into the memories of the relationship and addresses the messiness it left on her: "The way the tires turn stone on old country roads / They leave it muddy underneath, reminds me of you". The narrator eventually accepts what happened and moves on from the relationship: "I lived, and I learned / And found out what it was to turn around / And see that we / Were never really meant to be". Several critics commented that "You All Over Me" and some of its lyrics served as a prequel to "Clean" from Swift's album 1989 (2014), a track that also had the same theme of moving on from a relationship. (Note: Attributed to Jake Viswanath of Bustle, Kitty Empire of The Guardian, Rob Sheffield of Rolling Stone, Chris Willman of Variety, and Erin Browne of Vulture) In Taste of Country, Billy Dukes thought the lyrics were "soft-spoken" and suggested that the track's subject could be an abusive ex-lover whom the narrator now "harshly rebuked". Ellie Bate of BuzzFeed News found the song's opening line to resemble to that of the fellow album track "Fearless", which describes "rain on a sidewalk".

== Critical reception ==
When it was released, a few critics deemed "You All Over Me" similar to the original Fearless. Ross Horton of The Line of Best Fit stated that the song "has many of the same visceral, nostalgic thrills" from the album but with an "almost cinematic sheen". Mylrea wrote that the music gave her a little bit déjà vu and felt that the song, although a previously unreleased track, was "like a time capsule of the Fearless era". Bate believed that the track had "some of the most recognizable trademarks" of the album, attributing it to the lyricism and production.

Critics generally praised the songwriting, the production, and the vocal performances. Mylrea thought Swift's voice was more powerful than it was on the original Fearless and the lyrics showcased her storytelling that "manages to convey a whole relationship" in a few sentences and contains her signature putdown. Bate said that Swift's country twang on the song was endearing and a "tried and true hallmark of [Swift's] earlier discography", which she also described to the lyrics and its references. Lucy Harbron of Clash believed that the track's sound from its immediate predecessors would make it have "big radio potential". Jason Lipshutz from Billboard considered the lyrics to have "truly [demonstrated on] what set the singer-songwriter apart at a young age". The Guardian's writer Kitty Empire thought the "From the Vault" tracks were "a mixed bag", but she picked the song as a highlight and found its sound satisfying. Similarly, Chris Deville of Stereogum said that the tracks were solid, but he highlighted "You All Over Me" and wrote that it was a "moody duet" between Swift and Morris. The Times' author Will Hodgkinson considered the song "earnestly sweet", while Kelsey Barnes from Gigwise thought Swift's collaboration with Morris "fits perfectly alongside her other collaborations".

Some critics were more reserved in their praise. Willman believed that it had "a lot of terrific lines" reminiscent of Swift's early songwriting, but he stated that the track's electric guitar was "abrasive" and out of place yet also enough to "[feel] like 2008 heartland radio". Jackson Langford from MTV wrote that it was "spotlit and intimate" and applauded Swift's delivery and Morris' contribution, but he felt that Swift could have used more country twang. The Telegraph's music journalist Neil McCormick said that the song's "siniously seductive" nature would have been a little "too pushily aggressive for Taylor's teenage image". Jonathan Keefe of Slant Magazine thought the track's "remarkably sleazy reading" was an outlier among the other lyrical motifs on the album.

Later reviews of "You All Over Me" were included in lists and rankings of Swift's songs and have been fairly positive. Gajjar said that it was "a lovely trip down memory lane" and had "a seemingly simple but beautiful and effective melody". Billboard writers considered the song "Fearless-core at its finest" and thought Morris' vocal contribution made Swift's songwriting "shine brighter". Jake Viswanath of Bustle wrote that it "almost feels too mature" for Fearless, which was further added by Swift's vocals and her wisdom as an adult. Steffanee Wang of Nylon said that the song has her most vivid storytelling to date.

== Commercial performance ==
Selling 12,000 downloads in its first week, "You All Over Me" debuted atop on the US Country Digital Song Sales chart and became Swift's 16th number-one entry and Morris' fourth. The song reached number six on Hot Country Songs, where it marked Swift's 25th top-10 entry and Morris' seventh. The song was also the second track from Fearless (Taylor's Version) to chart within the top 10. On the all-genre Billboard Hot 100, "You All Over Me" became Swift's 130th chart entry when it debuted and peaked at number 51 and collected 9.2 million streams; it extended her record of the most entries for a female artist. The song reached number 26 on the Rolling Stone Top 100, where it garnered 8.3 million streams and sold 76,000 units upon release.

Outside of the US, "You All Over Me" debuted and peaked at number 35 on the Billboard Global 200 and reached the national charts of Canada (29), Australia (34), Ireland (35), and the United Kingdom (52). The song also peaked at number three on RMNZ's New Zealand Hot Singles chart.

== Credits and personnel ==
Credits are adapted from the liner notes of Fearless (Taylor's Version).

- Taylor Swift – lead vocals, songwriting, production
- Maren Morris – featured artist
- Scooter Carusoe – songwriting
- Aaron Dessner – production, record engineering, acoustic guitar, bass guitar, drum programming, electric guitar, engineering, high string guitar, keyboards, percussion, piano, synthesizer, recording
- Eric Slick – drums, recording
- Josh Kaufman – electric guitar, harmonica, recording
- Bella Blasko – engineering, recording
- Christopher Rowe – vocal engineering
- Greg Kurstin – vocal engineering
- Julian Burg – vocal engineering
- Jonathan Low – mixing, engineering
- Randy Merrill – mastering

== Charts ==
Chart performance
Chart (2021)	Peak position
Australia (ARIA)	34
Canada Hot 100 (Billboard)	29
Global 200 (Billboard)	35
Ireland (IRMA)	35
New Zealand Hot Singles (RMNZ)	3
UK Singles (Official Charts)	52
US Billboard Hot 100	51
US Hot Country Songs (Billboard)	6
US Rolling Stone Top 100	26

== Release history ==
List of releases
Region	Date	Format	Label	Ref.
Various	March 26, 2021	Digital download	Republic	
