= Scott Irby-Ranniar =

American actor and singer

- Born: Harlem, New York, U.S.
- Occupation: Actor
- Years active: 1998–present

Scott Irby-Ranniar is an American actor and singer. He is best known for originating the role of Young Simba in the Broadway production of The Lion King in 1997. He is a former member of the band Steel Train.
