= Rachel Antonoff =

American fashion designer

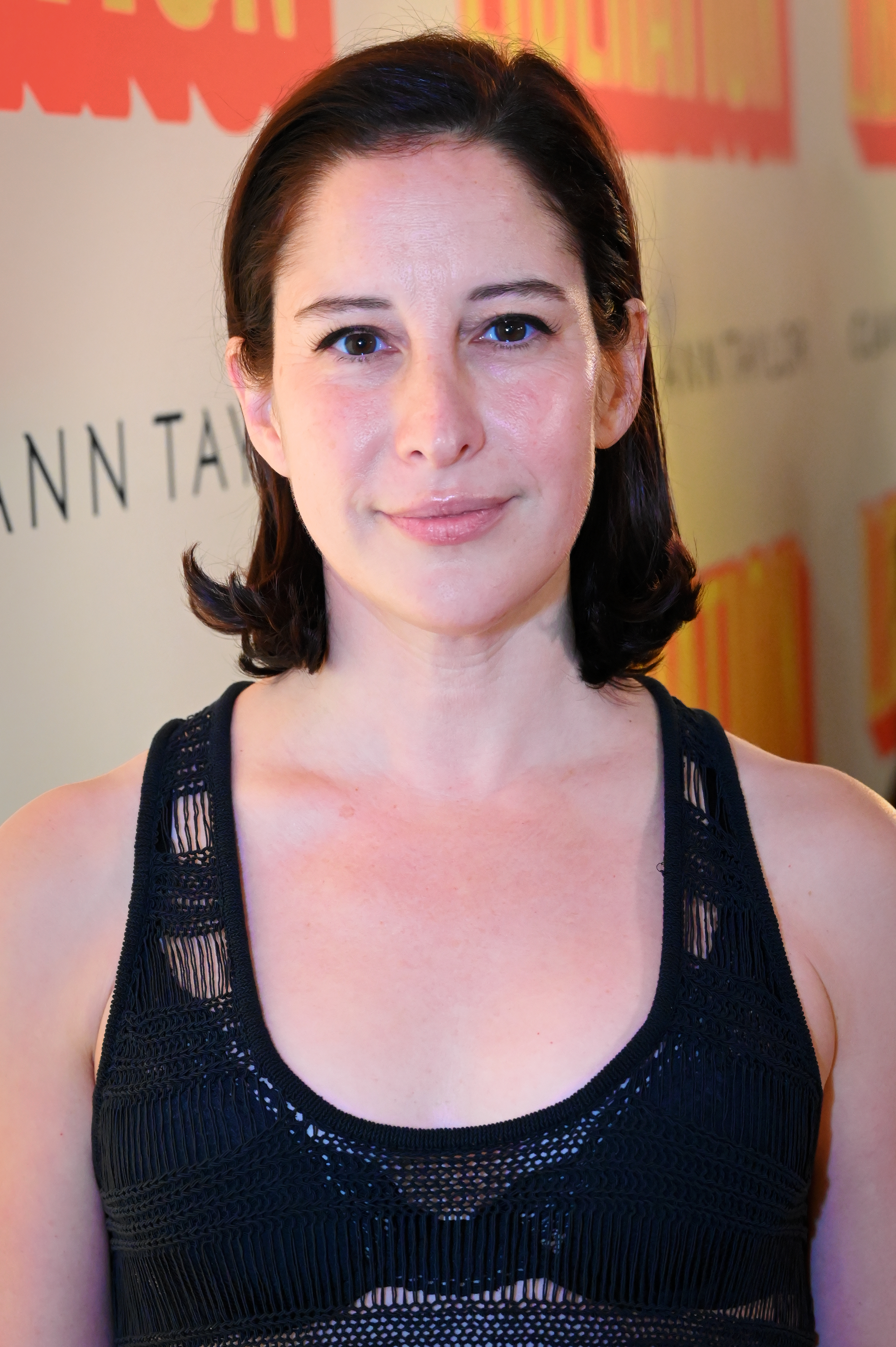
- Antonoff in 2025
- Born: June 15, 1981 (age 45); Teaneck, New Jersey, U.S.
- Occupation: Fashion designer
- Relatives: Jack Antonoff (brother)
- Awards: Professional Children's School Legacy Award
- Website: www.rachelantonoff.com

Rachel Antonoff (born June 15, 1981) is an American fashion designer known for her detailed and vintage clothing and their political themes, especially activism. She launched her label in 2008, drawing attention for products such as her “reproductive tee” and slogan sweatshirts that blend activism with style. Her designs have been worn by celebrities such as Lena Dunham and Zooey Deschanel, and her unconventional fashion presentations—often involving musical theater and short films—have earned her a reputation for creativity and inclusivity. A longtime advocate for LGBTQ rights, Antonoff is also a co-founder of The Ally Coalition. She is the sister of musician Jack Antonoff.

== Early life and interest ==
Born in Teaneck, New Jersey, Rachel Antonoff was raised in nearby New Milford, where she and her brother Jack Antonoff, singer and songwriter of Bleachers and lead guitarist of the indie rock band Fun, would commute to the Upper West Side to attend the Professional Children's School where Rachel studied theater. Her younger sister, Sarah, died of brain cancer at the age of 13. Growing up, Rachel and her brother Jack became very involved in the punk rock and hardcore music scene in the 1990s. When Jack went on tour with his band around the country, Rachel tagged along. Later Antonoff attributed this experience with influencing the way in which she creates. During her twenties, she attended Fordham University and briefly worked as a freelance writer after graduation. During the same time, Antonoff loved clothing and frequently discussed designing clothes with her roommate at the time.

When Antonoff was 22, she and her roommate and best friend began their fashion business, Mooka Kinney. They took three print designs and some fabric to their childhood neighbor and seamstress in New Jersey who sewed six samples in her basement. The first dress was called the "Swan Dress," a sleeveless baby doll mini dress made out of a green printed fabric with swans found at Mood, a well known fabric store in New York City. From there, the two got some friends to model their designs and sent the photos to Antonoff's contacts. The only response the pair received was from Teen Vogue who scheduled a meeting to meet Antonoff and her partner and to see the samples. After the meeting the contact wrote a story about the two and made a call to the buyer at Barneys New York. After the phone call the buyer placed an order for 300 units.

== Career ==
Rachel Antonoff launched her namesake brand in 2008, debuting with the Spring 2009 season. Her designs often feature sweatshirts and dresses, reflecting her preference for comfort and ease. Inspired by the 1950s to 1970s, the brand incorporates vintage prints, political messages, and in-house painted designs. Notable items include the “reproductive tee,” worn by Lena Dunham, and slogans like “Hysterical Female” and “I’m With Her.” Celebrities such as Lena Dunham, Zooey Deschanel, and Diane Guerrero have worn her clothing.

To present her collections Antonoff is known for frequently making videos rather than conducting a live fashion show. The idea originally came from friend Lena Dunham as a way to save money, but has continued as a creative project that better captures the brand. Antonoff is known to create stories and characters for these videos and includes unique models of all sizes, her mother, grandmother, and friends. She also frequently collaborates with brother Jack Antonoff on musical choices. For instance, Antonoff debuted her Fall 2016 collection by staging a complete Broadway musical performance. The performance included a cast of dancers from the show How to Succeed in Business Without Really Trying that danced to the song "A Secretary is Not a Toy". The performance also includes live vocals from singer Ali Stroker and Jack Antonoff played the role of male secretary. The cast of dancers, soloist, and brother wore clothes from the collection.

In 2015, director and actress Lena Dunham promoted Antonoff's collaboration with & Other Stories in a short film called Vote Audrey. Dunham famously wore Antonoff's Uterus Sweater to a Planned Parenthood event where she then auctioned it off to raise an additional $4,000 for the cause. The text of her popular 2013 "I'm With Her" sweatshirt descended into politics after Hillary Clinton's campaign adopted I'm With Her as the campaign's slogan. Antonoff starred in and was the creative director for the music video for Tegan and Sara's "Boyfriend" in 2016.

== Activism ==
Antonoff and members of the band Fun formed The Ally Coalition, or TAC, to encourage those in the fashion and entertainment industries to use their influence to end discrimination against LGBTQ people. She has long been fighting for LGBTQ equality and donates a percentage of the proceeds from her collections to support organizations that share the same goals. Antonoff also offered her support to a number of other organizations including GLAAD, Human Rights Campaign, The Trevor Project, and Freedom To Marry.

From 2009 to 2013, Antonoff dated musician Nate Ruess. For Antonoff's brother's band Steel Train, she and Ruess both provided backing vocals for the song "Dakota" from the 2007 album Trampoline. Her brother and Ruess were both in the band Fun. Antonoff sang on a few songs for Fun, and acted in the widely seen video for "We Are Young", the band's biggest hit.
