= Emmi Peltonen =

Finnish figure skater

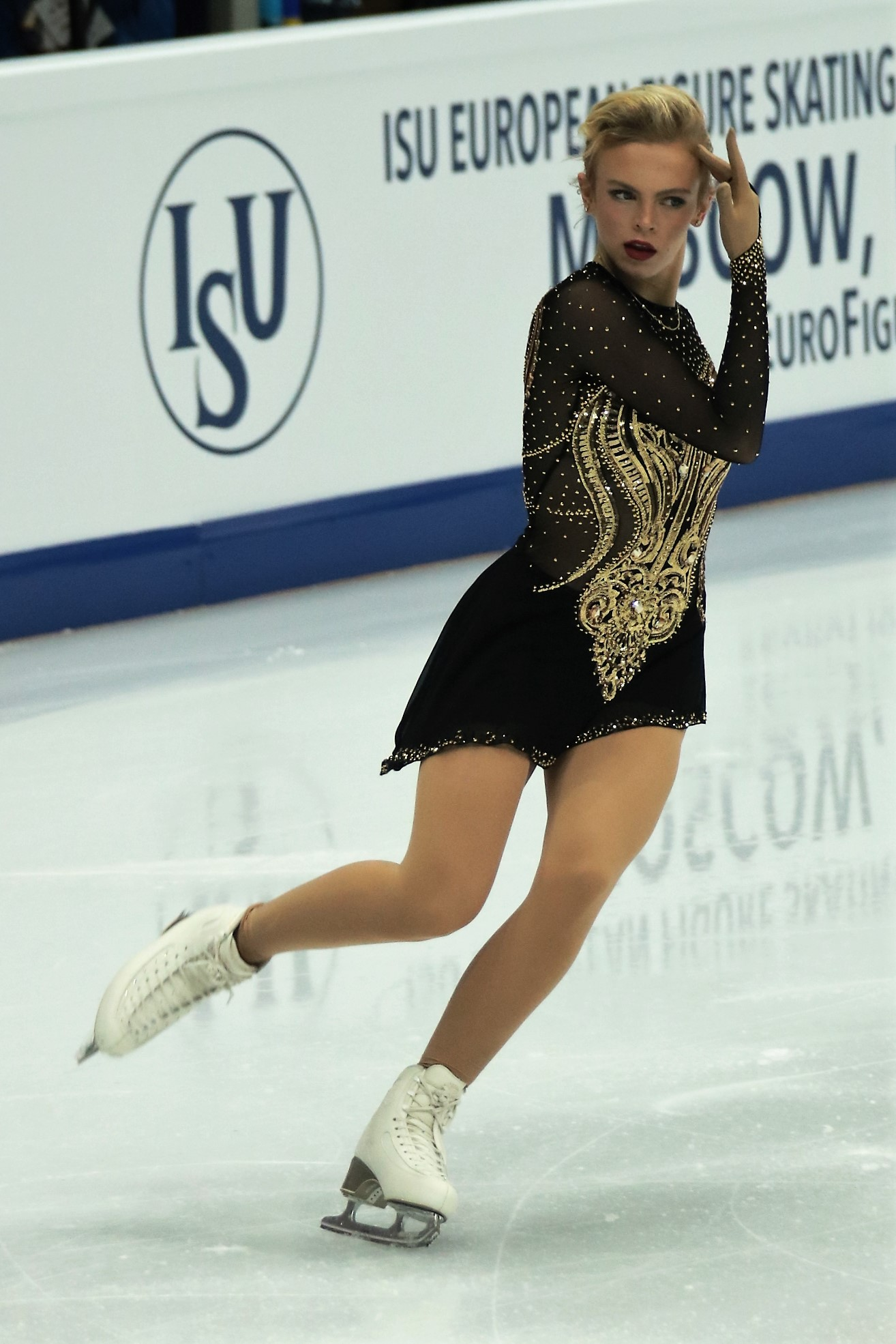
- Peltonen at the 2018 European Championships

Personal information
- Born: November 19, 1999 (age 26) Nashville, Tennessee, U.S.
- Home town: Helsinki, Finland
- Height: 5 ft 4 in (1.62 m)

Figure skating career
- Country: Finland
- Discipline: Women's singles
- Coach: Sirkka Kaipio; Hanna Peltonen
- Skating club: Helsingin Taitoluisteluklubi
- Began skating: 2002
- Retired: April 14, 2025

Medal record
Finnish Championships
Gold medal – first place	2017 Tampere	Singles
Gold medal – first place	2018 Kouvola	Singles
Gold medal – first place	2020 Vantaa	Singles
Silver medal – second place	2019 Kouvola	Singles
Bronze medal – third place	2022 Pori	Singles

Emmi Peltonen (born November 29, 1999) is a retired Finnish figure skater. She is the 2017 FBMA Trophy champion, the 2020 Nordic silver medalist, and a three-time Finnish national champion (2016, 2017, 2019). She has finished within the top ten at three European Championships, and represented Finland at the 2018 Winter Olympics, where she finished twentieth.

== Personal life ==
Peltonen was born on 29 November 1999 in Nashville, Tennessee. She has two brothers, twins Aleksi and Jesper (one year older), and a sister, Nelli (six years younger). Their Finnish parents – Hanna, a former figure skater, and Ville Peltonen, a former ice hockey player – had moved to the United States due to his contract with the NHL's Nashville Predators franchise. The family returned to Finland a few years later. Her paternal grandfather, Esa Peltonen, is also a former professional ice hockey player.

== Career ==
=== Early years ===
Peltonen received her first skates when she was two years old and began learning to skate in 2002. She competed domestically for the United States as a child at the juvenile level until 2010. She began competing on the advanced novice level at international events in the 2011–2012 season. She won the novice gold medal at the 2013 Nordic Championships.

=== 2013–2014 season: Junior international debut ===
Peltonen debuted on the junior international level in the 2013–2014 season. She won the junior silver medal at the Finnish Championships and Nordic Championships, both times finishing second to Jenni Saarinen.

=== 2014–2015 season ===
Virpi Horttana coached Peltonen at Espoo Skating Club in Espoo, Finland. Her ISU Junior Grand Prix (JGP) debut came in August 2014; she finished ninth at her assignment in Courchevel, France.

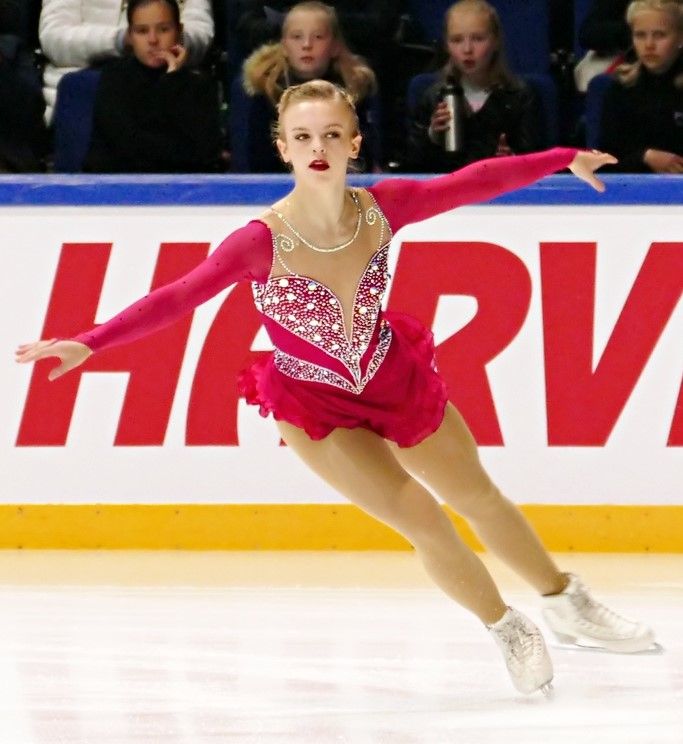
Peltonen at the 2015 CS Finlandia Trophy

Competing on the senior level at the Finnish Championships, she placed eighth in the short program, fourth in the free skate, and fourth overall.

=== 2015–2016 season: Senior international debut ===
In 2015–2016, Peltonen was coached by Sirkka Kaipio in Helsinki and Järvenpää, and by Rafael Arutyunyan in California. She placed fifteenth at her sole JGP assignment in Linz, Austria.

Making her senior international debut, Peltonen placed tenth at the Finlandia Trophy, a Challenger Series (CS) event in October 2015. She did not compete at the Finnish Championships in December but took the junior bronze medal at the Nordic Championships a couple of months later.

=== 2016–2017 season ===
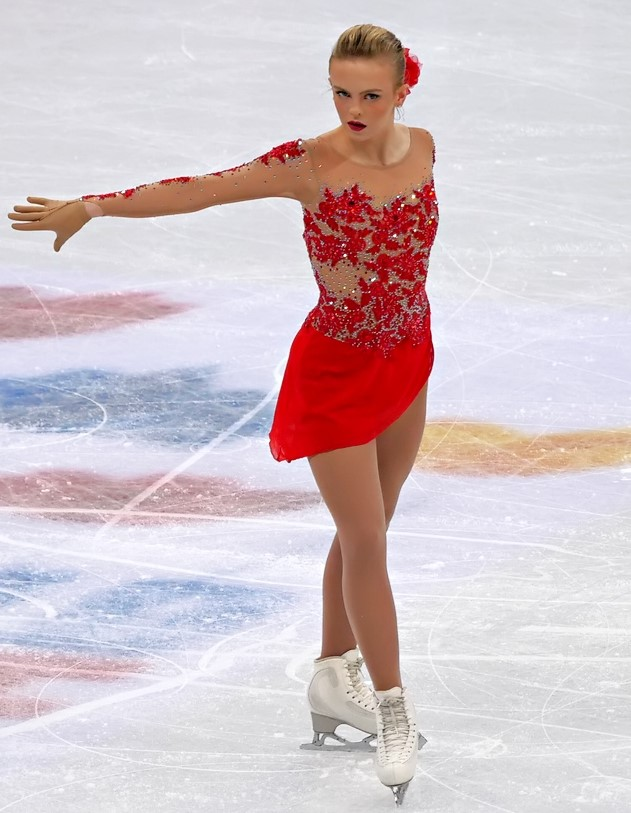
Peltonen at the 2017 World Championships

During the summer, Peltonen trained with Arutyunyan in California. In August, she placed fifth at her JGP assignment in Saint Gervais-les-Bains, France. She then competed at several senior internationals, finishing twelfth at the CS Finlandia Trophy, fourteenth at the Volvo Open Cup, and sixth at the CS Warsaw Cup.

In December 2016, Peltonen won the senior gold medal at the Finnish Championships in Tampere, having outscored silver medalist Jenni Saarinen by eight points. She was named in Finland's team to the 2017 European Championships in Ostrava. Ranked fourteenth in the short program and ninth in the free skate, she finished eleventh overall in the Czech Republic.

Peltonen competed at the 2017 World Championships in Helsinki, Finland, but did not advance to the free skate, having placed twenty-ninth in the short program.

=== 2017–2018 season ===
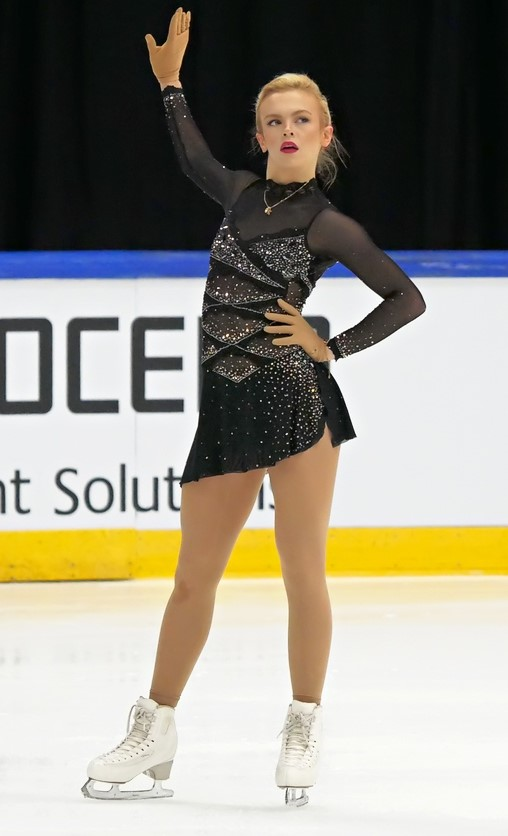
Peltonen at the 2017 CS Finlandia Trophy

In September 2017, Finland qualified a spot in the ladies event at the 2018 Winter Olympics due to Viveca Lindfors' result at the 2017 CS Nebelhorn Trophy. In December, Peltonen won her second consecutive national title, finishing ahead of silver medalist Lindfors by a margin of 4.22 points.

In January, Peltonen placed eleventh in the short program, eighth in the free skate, and ninth overall at the 2018 European Championships in Moscow, Russia; she was Finland's top lady at the event, finishing 11 points ahead of Lindfors. On 24 January 2018, the Finnish Olympic Committee selected Peltonen to compete at the Olympics. She finished twentieth in the ladies' event.

=== 2018–2019 season ===
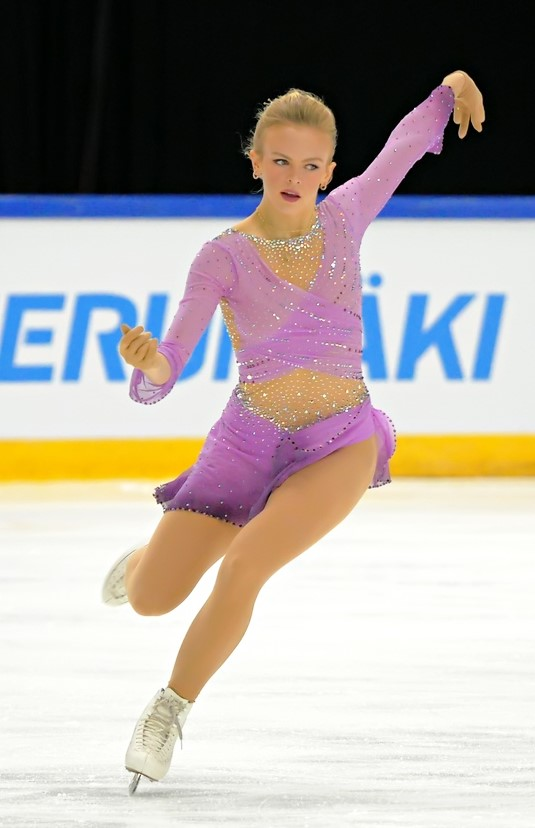
Peltonen at the 2018 CS Finlandia Trophy

Peltonen began the new season at the 2018 CS Finlandia Trophy on home soil, finishing in fifth place, two ordinals below Lindfors, who won the bronze medal. She then debuted on the Grand Prix series at the special 2018 Grand Prix of Helsinki, where she placed ninth.

Peltonen won the silver medal at the Finnish Championships, finishing behind Lindfors. She finished eighth at the 2019 European Championships, while Lindfors won the bronze medal. Based on the season's results, the Finnish Federation assigned Lindfors to Finland's lone ladies' spot at the 2019 World Championships. However, Peltonen was subsequently given the spot following Lindors' withdrawal due to injury and placed twenty-eighth at the World Championships in Saitama.

=== 2019–2020 season ===
Assigned to only one Grand Prix event, the 2019 Rostelecom Cup, she placed twelfth among twelve skaters. Withdrawing from some other events, she won the Finnish national title again and was assigned to compete at the European Championships. She was fifth in the short program at the European Championships with a new personal best and described her "Caruso" program as her favourite to date. Seventh in the free skate with one fall, she remained in fifth place overall.

After winning the silver medal at the Nordic Championships, Peltonen was scheduled to compete at the World Championships in Montreal, but those were cancelled as a result of the coronavirus pandemic.

=== 2020–2021 season ===
Peltonen was scheduled to compete on the Grand Prix at the 2020 Internationaux de France, but this event was cancelled as a result of the pandemic.

=== 2021–2022 season ===
Peltonen withdrew from her first two Challenger assignments, the Lombardia and Nebelhorn Trophies. At the 2021 CS Denis Ten Memorial Challenge, a third Challenger, she finished fourth and was later eighth at the 2021 CS Warsaw Cup before winning the Open d'Andorra.

Despite winning the bronze medal at the Finnish championships, Peltonen was assigned to one of the two Finnish berths at the 2022 European Championships. However, she subsequently withdrew from the European Championships due to an ankle injury.

=== 2022–2023 season ===
In her season debut at the Volvo Open Cup, Peltonen won the bronze medal. After contracting COVID-19, she was forced to withdraw from her other planned fall assignments, including the special home 2022 Grand Prix of Espoo. Her only other event of the season was the 2022 CS Golden Spin of Zagreb, where she placed sixteenth.

=== 2023–2024 season ===
Peltonen finished seventh at the 2023 CS Autumn Classic International in her first appearance of the year, and went on to finish seventh as well at the 2023 CS Finlandia Trophy. She would subsequently compete at the 2023 Trophée Métropole Nice Côte d'Azur, where she won the gold medal before going on to finish eighth at the 2023 CS Warsaw Cup.

Following a fourth-place finish at the 2023–24 Finnish Championships, Peltonen was selected to compete at the 2024 European Championships, where she placed twelfth.

=== 2024–2025 season ===
Beginning her season in late November, Peltonen competed at the 2024 NRW Trophy, where she finished in fifth place.

== Programs ==
Season	Short program	Free skating	Exhibition
2023–2024	Je suis malade by Serge Lama performed by Saara Aalto choreo. by Mark Pillay	Adiós Nonino (Tango Rapsodia) by Astor Piazzolla performed by Myung-whun Chung & Orchestra dell'Accademia Nazionale di Santa Cecilia choreo. by Mark Pillay	
2022–2023	Je suis malade by Serge Lama performed by Saara Aalto choreo. by Mark Pillay	End of Love arranged by Maxime Rodriguez choreo. by Mark Pillay	
2021–2022	Like a River Runs by Sia & Bleachers choreo. by Mark Pillay	End of Love arranged by Maxime Rodriguez choreo. by Mark Pillay	
2020–2021	I Idolize You by Lizz Wright	Vinegar and Salt by Hooverphonic	
2019–2020	Caruso By Lucio Dalla Performed by Jackie Evancho	Vinegar and Salt by Hooverphonic	
2018–2019	Caruso By Lucio Dalla Performed by Jackie Evancho	Suite for Cello and Orchestra: Sayuri's Theme; Chairman's Waltz (from Memoirs of a Geisha) By John Williams	
2017–2018	Jalousie 'Tango Tzigane' by Jacob Gade	Papa, Can You Hear Me? (from Yentl) by Michel Legrand	
2016–2017	Libertango by Astor Piazzolla	Papa, Can You Hear Me? (from Yentl) by Michel Legrand	Like a River Runs by Bleachers
2015–2016	Woman by Album Blanc	Violin Fantasy by George Gershwin	
2014–2015	Heart of a King (from The Man in the Iron Mask) by Nick Glennie-Smith	Violin Fantasy by George Gershwin	
2013–2014	Variations on the Tango by Steve Margoshes	Asturias (Leyenda) by Isaac Albéniz	
2012–2013	Fantaisie-Impromptu by Frédéric Chopin	Asturias (Leyenda) by Isaac Albéniz	
2011–2012	Fantaisie-Impromptu by Frédéric Chopin	Tico-Tico no Fubá by Zequinha de Abreu	

== Competitive highlights ==
GP: Grand Prix; CS: Challenger Series; JGP: Junior Grand Prix

International
Event	13–14	14–15	15–16	16–17	17–18	18–19	19–20	20–21	21–22	22–23	23–24	24–25
Olympics					20th							
Worlds				29th		28th	C					
Europeans				11th	9th	8th	5th		WD		12th	
GP France								C				
GP Finland						9th				WD		
GP Rostelecom Cup							12th					
CS Autumn Classic											7th	
CS Budapest Trophy												WD
CS Denis Ten Memorial									4th			
CS Alpen Trophy						WD						
CS Finlandia			10th	12th	11th	5th			WD		7th	
CS Golden Spin										16th		
CS Lombardia					11th				WD			
CS Nebelhorn				WD		WD						
CS Tallinn						WD						
CS Warsaw Cup				6th			WD		8th	WD	8th	
FBMA Trophy				1st	1st							
Nordics						WD	2nd					
NRW Trophy												5th
Open d'Andorra									1st			
Santa Claus Cup					4th							
Tallink Hotels Cup							WD					
Trophée Nice											1st	
Volvo Open Cup				14th			4th			3rd		
International: Junior
Junior Worlds				WD								
JGP Austria			16th									
JGP France		9th		5th								
Dragon Trophy	3rd											
Hellmut Seibt		3rd										
Ice Challenge	5th											
Challenge Cup	3rd											
Nordics	2nd	WD	3rd									
NRW Trophy		18th										
Volvo Open Cup		9th										
National
Finnish Champ.	2nd J	4th		1st	1st	2nd	1st	C	3rd		4th	
