= Rollercoaster (Bleachers song) =

Single by Bleachers

from the album Strange Desire
- Released: June 10, 2014
- Recorded: 2013–14
- Genre: Pop rock; new wave
- Length: 3:08
- Label: RCA
- Songwriters: Jack Antonoff; John Hill
- Producers: Jack Antonoff; John Hill; Greg Kurstin

Bleachers singles chronology
"Shadow" (2014)	"Rollercoaster" (2014)	"Like a River Runs" (2014)

Music video
- "Rollercoaster" on YouTube

"Rollercoaster" is a song by American pop rock band Bleachers, released on June 10, 2014, through RCA Records, as the third single from the band's debut album Strange Desire, and was written by frontman Jack Antonoff and John Hill and produced by them featuring Greg Kurstin.

== Song info ==
In this song, Bleachers leader Jack Antonoff was admittedly heavily inspired by Bruce Springsteen, telling Radio.com "Rollercoaster" was his attempt at making his own modern version of his fellow New Jersey native's 1984 hit "Dancing in the Dark", and describing him as "like the greatest songwriter in history ever" and "just unapologetic and not afraid to make you dance or make you cry". The riff came from Antonoff experimenting with a synthesizer at his home studio in New Jersey. He described the process to CBS Sunday Morning as "just playing around," demonstrating how inspiration can stem from casual creativity. The song's music video was filmed by writer/director Richard Shepard. It was Antonoff who came to Shepard with the concept of the band playing on top of a van without realizing how dangerous that would be.

Antonoff stated about the song: ""Rollercoaster" is a sad song to me. It’s about looking back and trying to recognize yourself as someone who was way more willing to let the more wild parts of life come in. Specifically, it tells the story of the kind of romance that takes you out of your body—but it ends up being more about the days when that kind of thing was possible to begin with. For those reasons it’s dark to me."

== Critical reception ==
Variance described "Rollercoaster" a "brilliant summer anthem". The Fader called it "an insane rush of a song, powerful enough to make FADER's Best Tracks of 2014 list". Under the Radar describes it as a "great pop rock single".

== Chart performance ==
Despite not repeating the success of the debut single "I Wanna Get Better", "Rollercoaster" had a good chart performance, reaching #3 as its highest position on the Billboard Alternative Airplay.

== Track listing ==
Digital download
No.	Title	Length
1.	"Rollercoaster"	3:08
Total length:		3:08

CD single
No.	Title	Length
1.	"Rollercoaster"	3:08
Total length:		3:08

== Charts ==
Chart (2014)	Peak position
Canada Rock (Billboard)	27
Mexico Ingles Airplay (Billboard)	47
US Alternative Airplay (Billboard)	3
US Adult Alternative Airplay (Billboard)	26
US Hot Rock & Alternative Songs (Billboard)	19
US Rock & Alternative Airplay (Billboard)	11

== Certifications ==
Region	Certification	Certified units/sales
United States (RIAA)	Gold	500,000^{‡}
^{‡} Sales+streaming figures based on certification alone.
