= Morgon =

Morgon may refer to:

- Morgon (AOC), a French wine
- Morgon (character), a fictional prince in the book The Riddle-Master of Hed
- Morgon (commune), a commune of France
- Lakes of Morgon, lakes of the Tinée in the French Alps

== See also ==
- God morgon (disambiguation)
