= Good Morning Britain (disambiguation) =

Good Morning Britain is the current ITV Breakfast programme, replacing Daybreak.

Good Morning Britain may also refer to:

- Good Morning Britain (1983 TV programme), a programme on the TV-am breakfast television service between 1983 and 1992
- "Good Morning Britain" (song), a 1990 song by Aztec Camera

== See also ==
- Good Morning Television, better known as GMTV, an ITV TV broadcaster and its television show of the same name
- Good Morning with Anne and Nick, BBC TV programme
- Good Morning Sunday, BBC Radio 2 show
- Good Morning Scotland, BBC Radio Scotland show
- Good Morning Ulster, BBC Radio Ulster show
- Good morning (disambiguation)
