= Good morning =

"Good morning" is a common greeting in the English language. It may also refer to:

== Television ==
- Good Morning!!! (Australian show), a children's show
- Good Morning (New Zealand show), a daytime talk show
- Good Morning (Russian show), a news talk show
- Good Morning (CBS), a predecessor of the American news talk show The Early Show
- GMTV, a former national UK breakfast television contractor
- "Good Morning", an episode of the television series Teletubbies

== Film ==
- Good Morning (1955 film), a Russian film
- Good Morning (1959 film), a Japanese film
- Good Morning, a 2008 short Japanese animated film featured in Ani*Kuri15
- Good Morning (2022 film), a South Korean film
- Good Mourning (film)

== Music ==
=== Artists ===
- Good Morning (duo), an Australian indie rock duo

=== Albums ===
- Good Morning, a 1976 album by Daevid Allen, or the title song
- GO:OD AM, a 2015 album by Mac Miller
- Good Morning, a 2024 album by Choi Ye-na, or the title song

=== Songs ===
- "Good Morning" (1939 song), a song by Nacio Herb Brown from the 1939 film Babes in Arms, also used in the 1952 musical Singin' in the Rain
- "Good Morning" (Kanye West song), a 2007 song by American hip-hop artist Kanye West
- "Good Morning", a song by D'Cinnamons
- "Good Morning", a song by Eggstone from Somersault
- "Good Morning", a song by Grouplove from Big Mess
- "Good Morning", a song by Baekhyun from Hello, World
- "Good Morning", a song by Blackfoot from Marauder
- "Good Morning", a song by Brymo from The Son of a Kapenta
- "Good Morning", a song by Lionel Richie from Just Go
- "Good Morning" (Chamillionaire song), a 2009 hip-hop single
- "Good Morning", a song by John Legend from Evolver
- "Good Morning" (Max Frost song), a 2018 pop single
- "Good Morning", a song by Rogue Wave from Permalight
- "Good Mornin'", a song by You Am I
- "Goodmorning", a song by Bleachers from Gone Now
- "Good Morning", a song from the 2019 film Ek Ladki Ko Dekha Toh Aisa Laga

== Other uses ==
- Good-morning, a weight training exercise
- Good Morning (magazine), a magazine published by Ellis Jones and cartoonist Art Young from 1919 to 1921

== See also ==
- Good Morning Good Morning, a 1967 song by the Beatles
- Good Mourning (disambiguation)
- God morgon (disambiguation)
