= Good Mourning =

Good Mourning may refer to:

- Good Mourning (album), a 2003 Alkaline Trio album
- Good Mourning (film), a 2022 American comedy
- "Good Mourning" (Grey's Anatomy), a 2009 American TV episode
- "Good Mourning/Black Friday", a two-piece Megadeth song on the 1986 album Peace Sells... but Who's Buying?
- "Good Mourning", a Halsey song on the 2017 album Hopeless Fountain Kingdom

== See also ==
- Good morning (disambiguation)
