= Merry Christmas, Please Don't Call =

2024 song by Bleachers

Single by Bleachers
- Released: November 13, 2024
- Studio: Electric Lady Studios (New York City) and Paisley Park (Chanhassen)
- Genre: Alternative; Chamber pop; Christmas
- Length: 3:39
- Label: Dirty Hit
- Songwriter: Jack Antonoff
- Producer: Jack Antonoff

"Merry Christmas, Please Don't Call" is a single by American indie pop act Bleachers. The song was written and produced by the band's frontman, Jack Antonoff, and was officially released in November of 2024.

== Background and lyrics ==
The band first previewed the song at the 8th Annual 'Ally Coalition Talent Show' in 2022. The talent show was co-founded by Antonoff with his sister Rachel Antonoff in 2013 in order to raise money for LGBT youth.

The single was officially released two years later on the 13th November 2024, after "years of writing and teasing at live shows." In the caption of an Instagram post celebrating the release, Antonoff said the long wait and different versions in the song's evolution were because it "can be hard to tell the story of someone you dont want around and still find a reason to tell it", and described the track as being "for anyone who has come to realize someone’s been chipping away at them and does not intend to stop."

The lyrics serve as an "intimate exploration" of the "heightened emotions" surrounding old connections during the holiday season, and have been noted as a "cease-and-desist order". The song has been described as a "quintessential Bleachers take on a holiday song".

== Live performances ==
On 17 December 2025, Bleachers performed the song on The Tonight Show Starring Jimmy Fallon.

== Music video ==
The official music video, directed by Clare Gillen, was released on November 26th 2024 and features "the full band performing as snow falls over them and their instruments on stage".

== Charts ==
Chart performance for "Merry Christmas, Please Don't Call"
Chart (2024–2026)	Peak position
Indonesia (Billboard)	20
Ireland (IRMA)	44
New Zealand Hot Singles (RMNZ)	9
Philippines (Billboard Philippines Hot 100)	69
Portugal (AFP)	147
UK Singles (Official Charts)	65
UK Independent Singles (Official Charts)	10
US Hot Rock & Alternative Songs (Billboard)	18
