= Don't Take the Money =

2017 song

Single by Bleachers

from the album Gone Now
- B-side: "Don't Take the Money" (Acoustic)
- Released: 30 March 2017
- Studio: Rough Customer Studios (Brooklyn, NY); Echo Studios (Los Angeles, CA)
- Genre: Pop; synth-pop
- Length: 3:35
- Label: RCA
- Songwriters: Jack Antonoff; Ella Yelich-O'Connor
- Producers: Antonoff; Greg Kurstin; Vince Clarke

Bleachers singles chronology
"Entropy" (2015)	"Don't Take the Money" (2017)	"Hate That You Know Me" (2017)

Music video
- "Don't Take the Money" on YouTube

"Don't Take the Money" is a song recorded by American indie pop act Bleachers from their second studio album Gone Now (2017). Frontman Jack Antonoff co-wrote the song with New Zealand singer Lorde, while production was handled by Antonoff, Greg Kurstin and Vince Clarke. It was released on 30 March 2017, by RCA Records as the album's lead single. "Don't Take the Money" is a pop and synth-pop song with influences from 1980s music. According to Antonoff, the song's title is a phrase he uses frequently in a motivational context about meeting a future lover.

"Don't Take the Money" received positive reviews from music critics, with several critics complimenting its production. Its sound was compared to the works of American musician Bruce Springsteen. Commercially, it peaked at number three on the Billboard Alternative Songs chart, and number 15 on the Rock Airplay chart. An accompanying music video was directed by American actress and filmmaker Lena Dunham, Antonoff's girlfriend at the time of the video's release; it was released on 2 May 2017. The video shows Antonoff as a soon-to-be groom as he fights to stay with his lover Giulia. Antonoff promoted the track by performing it live on television on several occasions.

== Background and composition ==
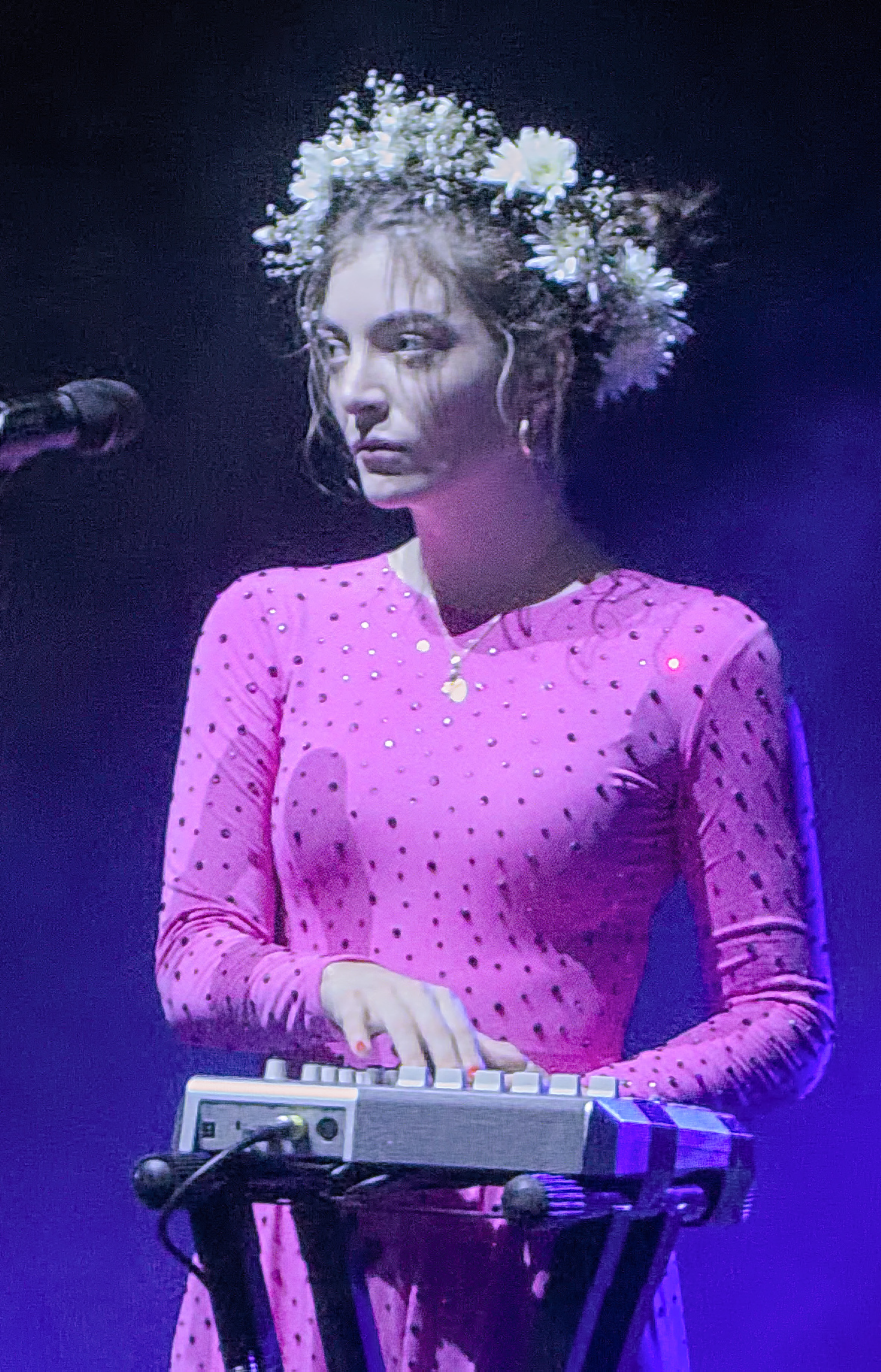
"Don't Take the Money" features backing vocals from New Zealand singer and co-writer Lorde

"Don't Take the Money" was co-written by Jack Antonoff, the sole member of Bleachers, and New Zealand singer Lorde (credited under her birth name Ella Yelich-O'Connor) with production input from Antonoff, Greg Kurstin and Vince Clarke. Lorde provides uncredited backing vocals on the final chorus. The pair wrote the song during a late night studio session. Antonoff proceeded to work for a year on the track "twisting it around".

According to Antonoff, the song's title is a phrase he frequently repeats to himself; it is not about "actual money" but rather a motivation phrase used in different contexts. The track was inspired by Lena Dunham, Antonoff's girlfriend at the time. In an interview with Newsweek, Antonoff also said that the song's title means "don't sell out"; the expression describes a lover continuing a relationship despite its misfortunes. The artwork for the song is a shot of Antonoff and American actress and drag queen Flawless Sabrina, with her face out of frame.

"Don't Take the Money" is composed in the key of D-flat major with a tempo of 110 beats per minute. Its chord progression follows a basic sequence of D♭–G♭–B♭m–G♭. It is a pop and synth-pop song, with influences of 1980s music. Antonoff revealed in an interview with Vulture that the Linn drums from Queen's 1984 song "Radio Ga Ga" served as inspiration for the track's percussion. According to NME writer Jamie Milton, the song's lyrics detail adversity "through the lens of a relationship"; the pre-chorus represents a "flaming row" while the chorus "keeps the couple caught up in it together." Mike Wass of Idolator compared the track to songs from John Hughes film soundtracks while Nylon compared its sound to the music of American singer Bruce Springsteen. Newsweek's Tufayel Ahmed called "Don't Take the Money" an "'80s synth-pop nirvana".

== Release and reception ==
A day before the release of "Don't Take the Money", Antonoff announced via Instagram a scavenger hunt on Union Square, Manhattan of flash drives labeled with the song's title, which included a file of the track. The flash drives were hidden inside several piñatas resembling the singer, along with bats to beat the piñatas with. The single was officially released the following day on 31 March 2017 through RCA Records. A 12" record limited release of the single features an acoustic version of the track as its B-side. It was released on June 30, 2017, through the Bleachers webstore.

"Don't Take the Money" received mostly positive reviews from music critics, with several critics complimenting its production. It was also compared to the music used in films by American filmmaker John Hughes. PopMatters writer Ethan King called it the "album's best", praising Antonoff for "combining an infinitely re-playable arena-pop with an emotional gush." In his album review, Pitchfork writer Sam Sodomsky called "Don't Take the Money" a "worthy [addition] to his catalog". Kayleigh Hughes of Consequence of Sound named it the album's essential track, praising the song for its "romantic pleading, noble desperation, and pure unabashed effusion" as well as its "'80s theatricality". Commercially, "Don't Take the Money" charted at number three on the Billboard Alternative Songs chart. It also peaked on the Rock Airplay and Hot Rock Songs charts at number 15 and 16, respectively. On the Adult Pop Songs, the track peaked at number 22.

== Music video ==
In this scene, two female models run towards a wedding getaway car. The video's portrayal of gender was praised by critics.

The accompanying music video for "Don't Take the Money" was directed by American actress and filmmaker Lena Dunham. The video was shot in New Jersey and premiered on Bleachers' YouTube channel on 2 May 2017. Aside from Antonoff, the clip features Italian twin models Giulia and Camilla Venturini as well as American actress and artist Alia Shawkat. Some of the actors in the video are genderqueer.

The video begins with an audio interlude of a groom (played by Antonoff) speaking to a marriage officiant (played by Shawkat); he expresses worries of marrying the bride (Giulia) due to her limited knowledge of English. The scene later transitions to Antonoff dressed in a bedazzled sailor suit as he sits down in a bright gold background with two identical twins (Giulia and Camila). VCR footage of flower children and the groom's parents is then interspliced with hi-def scenes of the same wedding. Giulia walks down the altar as the chorus begins.

In the following scene, figurines on the wedding cake are shown with blue disco ball heads. The guests of the wedding are revealed to be hot pink mannequins. The music stops as Antonoff lifts the bride's veil; the marriage officiant reads the ceremony script from a yellow New Jersey phone book. She looks up to see Giulia's lover (played by Camila), revealed to be a Russian spy, appear from the bushes dressed in commando clothing and a mesh top. Dialogue captions are shown during Giulia and Camila's scene. Camila punches Antonoff who falls on top of several mannequins; she proceeds to punch and spit on him several times. She drags his body through the wedding aisle and kicks him into a pool. Giulia and Camila then run off together and drive a wedding getaway car. The last scene shows Antonoff passed out in a pool with a bloody nose.

The music video received positive reviews from critics. Its visuals were compared to the films of American director Wes Anderson. Uproxx writer Alex Galbraith stated that the clip "perfectly [captured] the disaffected looks on everyone but Antonoff’s faces" as well as "chintzy and over-the-top decorations of his stage wedding". Lauren O'Neill of Noisey praised the video's cast, calling it a "perfectly sparkly music video experience". Time's Cady Lang noted that Dunham "borrowed heavily from bright, saturated, ’80s-style aesthetics to keep the concept fun," in contrast with the video's plot twist. Writing for Rolling Stone, Sarah Grant commented that the video matched the song's tonality; Grant also noted that the inclusion of a "Russian spy lovers twist" was a "comedic, good-natured nod" to the pair's support for same-sex marriage. Stereogum writer Tom Breihan called it a "bright, colorful video" and praised its progressive portrayal of gender.

== Live performances ==
Bleachers first performed "Don't Take the Money" on Jimmy Kimmel Live! on 17 April 2017. According to Spin, Antonoff was backed by a band and wore a New York Mets T-shirt. Stereogum writer Tom Breihan said that although Lorde was not present on stage to perform the track, Antonoff "made up for it with gawky nerd charisma and grand-gesture intensity". The song was also performed at The Ellen Degeneres Show under a "color pastel stage"; Antonoff took off his glasses midway through the performance and started "roaming all over the place." Bleachers served as a musical guest on Late Night with Seth Meyers backed by two drummers; DIY called it a "slightly more meditative, laid-back version of the track" but praised the act's versatility. Antonoff performed the track live on The Tonight Show with Jimmy Fallon on 6 June 2017; Breihan from Stereogum called it a "rousing, muscular version of the song". "Don't Take the Money" was also performed live at the 2017 MTV Video Music Awards. Towards the end of the performance, Antonoff "started knocking over equipment on stage". Antonoff and Lorde performed the song as part of a MTV Unplugged session; a live-album was released on 10 November 2017 with Lorde credited as a performer.

== Credits and personnel ==
Credits adapted from the liner notes of Gone Now and the official Bleachers YouTube channel.

- Jack Antonoff – vocals, keyboards, bass guitar, percussion, songwriter, producer
- Ella Yelich-O'Connor – background vocals, songwriter
- Greg Kurstin – keyboards, LinnDrum, producer, engineer
- Mikey Freedom Hart - electric guitar
- Vince Clarke – producer
- Julian Burg – additional engineer
- Alex Pasco – additional engineer
- Serban Ghenea – mixing

== Track listings ==
Digital download
No.	Title	Length
1.	"Don't Take the Money"	3:35

12" vinyl
No.	Title	Length
1.	"Don't Take the Money"	3:35
2.	"Don't Take the Money" (Acoustic)

== Charts ==
=== Weekly charts ===
Chart (2017)	Peak position
Canada Rock (Billboard)	47
US Adult Alternative Airplay (Billboard)	19
US Adult Pop Airplay (Billboard)	22
US Alternative Airplay (Billboard)	3
US Hot Rock & Alternative Songs (Billboard)	12
US Rock & Alternative Airplay (Billboard)	15

=== Year-end charts ===
Chart (2017)	Position
US Alternative Songs (Billboard)	16
US Hot Rock Songs (Billboard)	40
US Rock Airplay (Billboard)	27

== Certifications ==
Region	Certification	Certified units/sales
United States (RIAA)	Gold	500,000^{‡}
^{‡} Sales+streaming figures based on certification alone.
