= Lacs Les Laussets =

Group of lakes in France

Lakes Les Laussets
- Lacs Les Laussets (French)
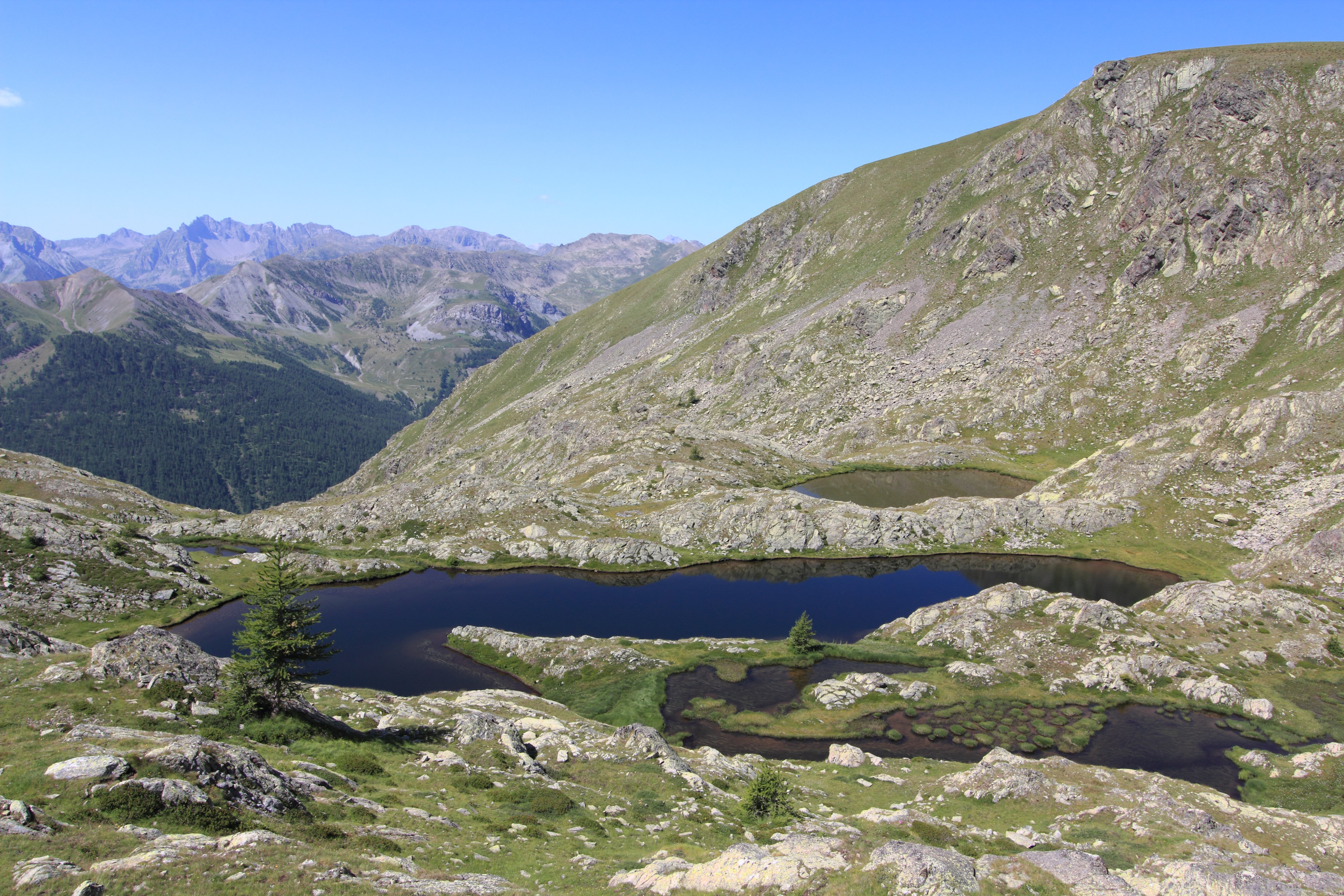
- A view on the Lakes Les Laussets (Tinée, French Alps).

- Location within Alps
- Location: Alpes-Maritimes, Alps
- Coordinates: 44°20′00″N 6°54′15″E
- Basin countries: France
- Surface elevation: 2,400 m (7,900 ft)

The lakes Les Laussets (French: Lacs Les Laussets) are a group of three lakes in the Tinée valley, Alpes-Maritimes, Alps, France. They are located at an elevation of 2400 m, south-east to the Crête des Terres Rouges, and close to the Tête des Mourres.

Of note, a group of lakes can be found in the vicinity of the lakes Les Laussets: the lakes of Morgon.

== Itinerary ==
On the way of the Col de la Bonette from the Saint-Étienne-de-Tinée side, two main itineraries are possible.

=== From the Hameau du Pra ===
From the hamlet of Pra, follow the trail that ascends the south-facing slope to reach the small plateau of Morgon. Leave the marked route leading to the forest house of Tortisse and climb into the Morgon valley. Find a pastoral hut and then continue through a scree slope. On the left, climb the rocky spine to find a secondary valley. Follow the small torrent and then reach the lakes Laussets.

=== From the Camp des Fourches ===
From the Camp des Fourches, go to the Col des Fourches. Follow the GR 5 to go down in the Cougnas ravine. Leave the GR at tag 37 (2100 m), cross a ravine, and follow on the right the small footpath in the Cabane valley, along the Salso Moreno torrent. Enter a small rocky gorge on the right, and find the Big Lake of Morgon. From there, walk west to reach the three lakes Les Laussets.
