= Bleachers (album) =

Studio album by Bleachers
- Released: March 8, 2024
- Recorded: 2022–2023
- Studios: Electric Lady (New York); Conway (Los Angeles); Esplanade (New Orleans); Rue Boyer (Paris); Pleasure Hill (Portland); Big Mercy (Brooklyn); Paisley Park (Chanhassen); Hutchinson (Brooklyn); Sharp Sonic (Los Angeles); Rough Customer (Brooklyn); Audu Music (Brooklyn)
- Genres: Pop rock; indie pop
- Length: 48:02
- Labels: Bleachers Band; Dirty Hit
- Producers: Jack Antonoff; Patrik Berger; Bartees Strange; Lana Del Rey; Florence Welch; Kevin Abstract; Romil Hemnani; Sounwave

Bleachers chronology
Live at Radio City (2023)	Bleachers (2024)	A Stranger Desired (2024)

Singles from Bleachers
- 1. "Modern Girl" Released: September 20, 2023; 2. "Alma Mater" Released: November 15, 2023; 3. "Tiny Moves" Released: January 17, 2024; 4. "Me Before You" Released: February 22, 2024

Bleachers is the fourth studio album by American rock band Bleachers, released on March 8, 2024. It is the band's first album under Dirty Hit and their own label, Bleachers Band Recordings, having departed from former label RCA Records in August 2023. It is also the first Bleachers album with longtime touring musicians Mikey Freedom Hart, Sean Hutchinson, Evan Smith, Michael Riddleberger, and Zem Audu credited as official members. The album was preceded by the release of four singles: "Modern Girl", "Alma Mater", "Tiny Moves", and "Me Before You".

A deluxe edition of the album was released in May 2024. Bleachers received generally favorable reviews from music critics and peaked at number three in Scotland, number five in the United Kingdom, and at number 62 in the United States.

== Background and release ==
Bleachers released their third studio album, Take the Sadness Out of Saturday Night, in July 2021. On January 1, 2022, Jack Antonoff announced on Twitter that a fourth Bleachers album would be released in 2022, though no album was released that year. In August 2023, they signed a new record deal with Dirty Hit, with their first release under the label, Live at Radio City, being released that same month.

"Modern Girl" was released as the lead single to Bleachers on September 20, 2023. It peaked at number five on the Adult Alternative Airplay chart and number six on the Alternative Airplay chart, charting for 20 weeks each. The second single, "Alma Mater", was released on November 15, featuring uncredited guest vocals and writing credits by American singer Lana Del Rey. The album was officially announced the same day. It was followed by the third single, "Tiny Moves", on January 17, 2024, with an accompanying music video starring Antonoff and his spouse, Margaret Qualley. The fourth and final single, "Me Before You", was released on February 22, which is according to Antonoff, a soft, "Streets of Philadelphia"–style song about the personal growth needed to begin a meaningful relationship, contrasting Antonoff's historical emotional drama with his contentment at Qualley asking him when he will be home for dinner.

Bleachers was released on March 8, 2024. The 22-track deluxe edition was released on May 17. It includes the extra original songs "I Am in Your Hands", "The Backwards Heart", "Question Mark", "The Big Bad Turnpike Ghost", "Margo", and "Drug Free America"; original demo recording of "Alma Mater"; and an acoustic version of "Self Respect".

== Conception ==
Antonoff wrote Bleachers with themes of love, loss, grief, contentment, marriage, and maturity, mostly based on his personal thoughts and experiences, influenced by the death of his sister, bad relationship experiences, childhood trauma, and his relationship with his wife.

Antonoff stated that he wanted to "explore how to make room in his life for more than his defining losses" and to "paint a more peaceful and mature picture of love". He stated, "The most inspiring thing is when you meet someone and you truly just want for them to be so happy. It's not simple. It's huge, it's controversial and it's wild, but it's simple in how easy it is".

Antonoff said about the process of making the album:

"In my past three albums, I felt very obsessed with the past and the future. I was deeply imagining things from before and things that could happen. But somewhere along the way, I just started only thinking about right now. This album feels like you're sitting in a room with me right now. It's definitely a new time for Bleachers because it feels like, things are really present, and that things are exciting and opening up for us.

There's always a fear in me that makes me want to make an album. I find myself scared of what was going to happen in my life, of who I would be, and where I would go. On this album, I felt terrified to enter a new phase of my life and also scared that it would mean that I wouldn't be able to take the people who I've lost with me. Which isn't true, because you can take them with you and still grow. This record is all about overcoming that fear".

== Critical reception ==
Professional ratings
Aggregate scores
Source	Rating
AnyDecentMusic?	6.6/10
Metacritic	68/100
Review scores
Source	Rating
AllMusic	3.5/5 stars
Clash	9/10
DIY	5/5 stars
The Independent	3/5 stars
The Line of Best Fit	6/10
MusicOMH	3.5/5 stars
NME	4/5 stars
Paste	6.4/10
Pitchfork	6.4/10
PopMatters	7/10

At Metacritic, which assigns a normalized rating out of 100 to reviews from mainstream critics, the album received an average score of 68 based on 16 reviews, indicating "generally favorable reviews". The review aggregator site AnyDecentMusic? compiled 18 reviews and gave Bleachers an average of 6.6 out of 10, based on their assessment of the critical consensus.

Lucy Gibbons of The Boar praised the concept and the sound of the album, calling it "a colourful album with a song for every occasion". Lauren Hague of Clash called the album an entrance for "their most monumental era yet", praising the band's shift from "solo voice" to the current form of "ensemble unity".

Sam Rosenberg of Paste called the album "handsomely crafted" and offers "a consistently pleasant" listen, yet "ultimately hollow" and never offers "a transcendent" listen. In a review for PopMatters, Rachel R. Carroll claimed this album saw the band settle into "a cohesive sense of artistry" but still without reaching "a clear resolution", calling Bleachers the band's "most cohesive project to date". Neive McCarthy of Dork called the album a "gorgeously tender return to form for the band".

Many publications saw Bleachers influenced by Bruce Springsteen's work, whom Antonoff has proclaimed as his idol many times, having worked together on "Chinatown", one of the dual lead singles of Bleachers' previous album, Take the Sadness Out of Saturday Night.

== Track listing ==
Bleachers track listing
No.	Title	Writer(s)	Producer(s)	Length
1.	"I Am Right on Time"	Jack Antonoff; Patrik Berger	Antonoff; Berger; Bartees Strange	3:32
2.	"Modern Girl"	Antonoff; Evan Smith	Antonoff; Berger	3:43
3.	"Jesus Is Dead"	Antonoff; Berger	Antonoff; Berger	3:10
4.	"Me Before You"	Antonoff; Berger	Antonoff; Berger	3:24
5.	"Alma Mater"	Antonoff; Lana Del Rey	Antonoff; Berger; Del Rey	3:30
6.	"Tiny Moves"	Antonoff; Berger	Antonoff; Berger	3:48
7.	"Isimo"	Antonoff	Antonoff; Berger	3:23
8.	"Woke Up Today"	Antonoff	Antonoff; Berger	2:31
9.	"Self Respect"	Antonoff; Florence Welch	Antonoff; Berger; Welch	4:14
10.	"Hey Joe"	Antonoff; Aaron Dessner	Antonoff; Berger	1:55
11.	"Call Me After Midnight"	Antonoff; Sam Dew; Kevin Abstract; Romil Hemnani; Ryan Beatty	Antonoff; Berger; Abstract; Hemnani	3:15
12.	"We're Gonna Know Each Other Forever"	Antonoff; Berger	Antonoff; Berger	3:02
13.	"Ordinary Heaven"	Antonoff; Berger; Sounwave	Antonoff; Berger; Sounwave	5:12
14.	"The Waiter"	Antonoff	Antonoff; Berger	3:23
Total length:				48:02

Bleachers – Deluxe edition
No.	Title	Writer(s)	Producer(s)	Length
15.	"I Am in Your Hands"	Antonoff; Berger	Antonoff	3:47
16.	"The Backwards Heart"	Antonoff	Antonoff	4:06
17.	"Question Mark"	Antonoff; Berger	Antonoff	1:48
18.	"The Big Bad Turnpike Ghost"	Antonoff	Antonoff	2:33
19.	"Margo"	Antonoff	Antonoff	3:08
20.	"Alma Mater" (from the day it was written)	Antonoff; Del Rey	Antonoff	2:34
21.	"Drug Free America"	Antonoff	Antonoff	4:33
22.	"Self Respect" (Acoustic)	Antonoff; Welch	Antonoff	2:24
Total length:				72:55

Bleachers – Standard vinyl editions
No.	Title	Writer(s)	Producer(s)	Length
15.	"I Am in Your Hands"	Antonoff; Berger	Antonoff	3:47
16.	"The Backwards Heart"	Antonoff	Antonoff	4:06
17.	"Question Mark"	Antonoff; Berger	Antonoff	1:48
18.	"The Big Bad Turnpike Ghost"	Antonoff	Antonoff	2:33
Total length:				60:16

Bleachers – Alternative cover vinyl edition
No.	Title	Writer(s)	Producer(s)	Length
15.	"I Am in Your Hands"	Antonoff; Berger	Antonoff	3:47
16.	"Margo"	Antonoff	Antonoff	3:08
17.	"Alma Mater" (from the day it was written)	Antonoff; Del Rey	Antonoff	2:34
18.	"Drug Free America"	Antonoff	Antonoff	4:33
Total length:				62:04

Bleachers – Japan exclusive edition
No.	Title	Writer(s)	Producer(s)	Length
15.	"Self Respect" (Demo)	Antonoff; Welch	Antonoff	2:24
Total length:				50:26

== Personnel ==
Bleachers

- Jack Antonoff – vocals, drums, Juno, programming, Moog, Mellotron, electric guitars, Polysix, acoustic guitar, bells, piano, M1, vocoders, percussion, upright bass, CP-80, whistle, glockenspiel, bass, cello, mixing, centerfold photo
- Mikey Freedom Hart – Juno, B3 organ, backing vocals, piano, synthesizers, vibraphone, guitars, marimba, French horn, Fender Rhodes, engineering assistance
- Sean "Hutch" Hutchinson – drums, percussion, drum programming, backing vocals, engineering assistance
- Michael "Riddles" Riddleberger – drums, percussion, backing vocals, engineering assistance
- Evan Smith – tenor saxophone, baritone saxophone, Juno, synthesizers, backing vocals, programming, engineering assistance
- Zem Audu – saxophone, synthesizers, backing vocals, engineering assistance

Additional musicians

- Patrik Berger – programming, OP-1, drums, acoustic guitar, electric guitar, upright bass, backing vocals, Juno, Mellotron, bottle, accordion, slide guitar, Moog (tracks 1–6, 8–12)
- Lana Del Rey – vocals (track 5)
- Margaret Qualley – talking (track 11)
- Bartees Strange – electric guitars, backing vocals, drums, Moog, Polysix, M1 (tracks 1, 5, 6)
- Florence Welch – vocals (track 9)
- Sam Dew – vocals (tracks 6, 9, 11, 13, 14)
- Clairo – vocals (tracks 4–6)
- Annie Clark – vocals (track 1)
- Claud – talking, vocals (tracks 3, 10, 11)
- Cole Kamen-Green – trumpet (track 11)
- Bobby Hawk – violin (tracks 2, 3, 6, 7)
- Matty Healy – piano (track 10)
- Oli Jacobs – backing vocals (track 6)
- Rodney Mullen – talking (track 13)

Technical

- Ruairi O'Flaherty – mastering
- Laura Sisk – mixing, engineering
- Oli Jacobs – engineering
- Jack Manning – engineering assistance
- Lauren Marquez – engineering assistance
- Jon Sher – engineering assistance
- Jesse Solon Snider – engineering assistance
- Rémy Dumelz – engineering assistance
- Joey Miller – engineering assistance
- Jozef Caldwell – engineering assistance
- Carl Bespolka – engineering assistance
- David Hart – engineering assistance

Visuals

- Alex Lockett – photography
- Samuel Burgess-Johnson – artwork, creative direction
- Patricia Villirillo – creative direction
- Ed Blow – creative direction

== Charts ==
Chart performance for Bleachers
Chart (2024)	Peak position
Belgian Albums (Ultratop Flanders)	155
Scottish Albums (Official Charts)	3
UK Albums (Official Charts)	5
UK Independent Albums (Official Charts)	1
US Billboard 200	62
US Top Alternative Albums (Billboard)	5
US Top Rock Albums (Billboard)	11
