= Everyone for Ten Minutes =

Studio album by Bleachers
- Released: May 22, 2026
- Recorded: 2024–2026
- Studios: Electric Lady (New York); Forward (Rome); Rough Customer (New York); Tamarind (Los Angeles); The Church (London); Urchin (London)
- Length: 39:19
- Labels: Bleachers Band; Dirty Hit
- Producer: Jack Antonoff

Bleachers chronology
Live from Madison Square Garden, NYC (2025)	Everyone for Ten Minutes (2026)

Singles from Everyone for Ten Minutes
- 1. "You and Forever" Released: February 11, 2026; 2. "Dirty Wedding Dress" Released: March 10, 2026; 3. "The Van" Released: April 2, 2026; 4. "I'm Not Joking" Released: April 30, 2026

Everyone for Ten Minutes (stylized in lowercase) is the fifth studio album by the American rock band Bleachers. Produced by the band's frontman Jack Antonoff, it was released on May 22, 2026, by the band's own label Bleachers Band Recordings and Dirty Hit.

== Promotion ==
The album was supported by the release of four singles. The lead single, "You and Forever", was released on February 11, 2026. The second single, "Dirty Wedding Dress", was released on March 10, 2026; a music video for the song would later be released on April 17, 2026. The third single, "The Van" was released on April 2, 2026. The fourth and final single, "I'm Not Joking" was released on April 30, 2026.

== Critical reception ==
Professional ratings
Aggregate scores
Source	Rating
AnyDecentMusic?	6.5/10
Metacritic	69/100
Review scores
Source	Rating
AllMusic	4/5 stars
Clash	8/10
DIY	4/5 stars
Dork	4/5 stars
Hot Press	7/10
The Line of Best Fit	5/10
Paste	C+
Pitchfork	5.9/10
The Skinny	4/5 stars
Sputnikmusic	2.8/5

According to the review aggregator Metacritic, everyone for ten minutes received "generally favorable reviews" based on a weighted average score of 69 out of 100 from seven critic scores. The review aggregator Any Decent Music gave the album a weighted average score of 6.5 out of 10 from thirteen critic scores.

== Track listing ==
All tracks are written by Jack Antonoff, with other writers noted.

Everyone for Ten Minutes track listing
No.	Title	Writer(s)	Length
1.	"Sideways"		3:27
2.	"The Van"	Mikey Freedom Hart; John Freeman; Vinnie Barrett; Bobby Eli	2:58
3.	"We Should Talk"	Zem Audu; Hart; Evan Smith; Sean Hutchinson; Michael Riddleberger	3:04
4.	"You and Forever"		3:54
5.	"Dirty Wedding Dress"		4:49
6.	"Take You Out Tonight"	Hart	4:28
7.	"I Can't Believe You're Gone"		3:26
8.	"Dancing"		3:14
9.	"She's from Before"		2:57
10.	"I'm Not Joking"	Audu; Hart; Smith; Hutchinson; Riddleberger	3:54
11.	"Upstairs at Els"		3:08
Total length:			39:19

=== Note ===
- All song titles are stylized in lowercase.
- "The Van" contains samples from "Just Don't Want to Be Lonely", performed by Blue Magic.

== Personnel ==
Credits are adapted from the album's liner notes.

=== Bleachers ===
- Jack Antonoff – lead vocals, background vocals, guitars, bass, drums, percussion, synthesizers, keyboards, programming, production, engineering
- Sean Hutchison – drums, percussion, background vocals, tres
- Michael Riddleberger – drums, percussion, background vocals
- Mikey Freedom Hart – bass, guitars, banjo, mandolin, Hammond organ, synthesizerzs, programming, background vocals, pedal steel
- Evan Smith – saxophones, synthesizers, guitars, keyboards, background vocals
- Zem Audu – saxophone, bass, vibraphone, keyboards, background vocals

=== Additional contributors ===
- Oli Jacobs – programming, instruments, background vocals, engineering, mixing
- Laura Sisk – drum programming, background vocals, engineering, mixing
- Jack Manning – background vocals, engineering
- Bobby Hawk – violin
- Jozef Caldwell – engineering
- Joey Miller – engineering
- Deaton Chris Anthony – engineering
- Lauren Marquez – engineering
- Ruairi O'Flaherty – mastering
- Alex Lockett – photography
- Samuel Burgess-Johnson – artwork
- Patricia Villirillo – creative direction
- Ed Blow – creative direction

== Charts ==
Chart performance for Everyone for Ten Minutes
Chart (2026)	Peak position
Australian Albums (ARIA)	73
French Physical Albums (SNEP)	176
French Rock & Metal Albums (SNEP)	23
Irish Independent Albums (IRMA)	13
Scottish Albums (Official Charts)	4
UK Albums (Official Charts)	18
UK Independent Albums (Official Charts)	2
US Billboard 200	148
US Independent Albums (Billboard)	20
US Top Rock & Alternative Albums (Billboard)	36
