= Strange Desire =

2014 debut studio album by Bleachers

Studio album by Bleachers
- Released: July 11, 2014
- Recorded: 2013–2014
- Genres: Indie pop; alternative rock; synth-pop; new wave
- Length: 38:55
- Label: RCA
- Producers: Jack Antonoff; John Hill; Greg Kurstin; Vince Clarke

Bleachers chronology
Strange Desire (2014)	Terrible Thrills, Vol. 2 (2015)

Singles from Strange Desire
- 1. "I Wanna Get Better" Released: February 18, 2014; 2. "Shadow" Released: May 6, 2014; 3. "Rollercoaster" Released: June 10, 2014; 4. "Like a River Runs" Released: June 23, 2014

Professional ratings
Aggregate scores
Source	Rating
Metacritic	68/100
Review scores
Source	Rating
AllMusic	4/5 stars
Alternative Press	3.5/5 stars
Consequence of Sound	C−
PopMatters	7/10
Rolling Stone	3/5 stars
Spin	6/10
Sputnikmusic	4/5
Under the Radar	3.5/10

Strange Desire is the debut studio album released by American indie pop act Bleachers, led by guitarist Jack Antonoff. The album was released on July 11, 2014, through RCA Records, and produced the singles "I Wanna Get Better", "Shadow", "Rollercoaster" and "Like a River Runs".

== Release ==
"I Wanna Get Better" was released digitally as the lead single from Strange Desire on February 18, 2014. It has peaked at number one on the Billboard Alternative Songs chart and number ten on the Hot Rock Songs chart, becoming Bleachers' most successful single to date. The song's music video – directed by actress and filmmaker Lena Dunham, Antonoff's then girlfriend – premiered on March 27, and depicts Antonoff as a troubled therapist. "Shadow" was made available for streaming on April 29, before being released as the album's second single on May 6. On May 15, Strange Desire was announced for release in July. Antonoff said the name was "the 2 words that perfectly title what this Bleachers album is as a documentation of my life as I can remember it at this point". "Rollercoaster" was released as the third single on June 10 and was also made available upon pre-ordering Strange Desire on the iTunes Store. "Like a River Runs" was made available for streaming on June 27. Strange Desire was released on July 15 through RCA Records, and was made available for streaming the following day.

Following the release, the group performed at a number of festivals: Wireless, Osheaga, Lollapalooza, Outside Lands Music, Boston Calling Music and ACL Music. "Rollercoaster" was released to radio on September 9. In late November, the group released Strange Desire (The Demos) for Record Store Day Black Friday, consisting of six album demos. In March and April 2015, the group embarked on a headlining US tour, dubbed Bleachers Come Alive!, with support from Joywave and Night Terrors of 1927. Following this, the band appeared at Rock in Rio festival in May. In June and July, the group went on a mixture of US, European and Canadian shows. In July and August, the group went on a co-headlining US tour with Charli XCX, titled Charli and Jack Do America Tour. On August 12, a music video was released for "Like a River Runs". The group was scheduled to go on a second leg of their tour with Charli XCX in September and October. However, on August 22 it was announced that the leg had been cancelled amid creative and personal differences.

== Track listing ==
All tracks are written by and produced by Jack Antonoff and John Hill, except where noted.

No.	Title	Writer(s)	Producer(s)	Length
1.	"Wild Heart"		Hill; Antonoff; Vince Clarke^{[a]}	3:20
2.	"Rollercoaster"		Greg Kurstin; Hill; Antonoff	3:08
3.	"Shadow"	Antonoff; Hill; Emile Haynie		3:51
4.	"I Wanna Get Better"			3:24
5.	"Wake Me"	Antonoff; Patrik Berger; Hill		2:43
6.	"Reckless Love"			3:01
7.	"Take Me Away" (featuring Grimes)	Antonoff; Claire Boucher; Hill		2:30
8.	"Like a River Runs"		Hill; Antonoff; Clarke^{[a]}	3:33
9.	"You're Still a Mystery"			4:24
10.	"I'm Ready to Move On / Wild Heart Reprise" (featuring Yoko Ono)	Antonoff; Yoko Ono; Hill	Hill; Antonoff; Clarke^{[a]}	4:11
11.	"Who I Want You to Love"	Antonoff; Hill; Haynie		4:50
Total length:				38:55

Strange Desire (Japanese Edition)

No.	Title	Length
12.	"I Wanna Get Better" (RZA remix)	3:25
13.	"I Wanna Get Better" (Vince Clarke remix)	4:33
14.	"I Wanna Get Better" (demo version)	2:43
15.	"Wild Heart" (demo version)	3:11
16.	"Reckless Love" (demo version)	1:52
Total length:		54:39

Notes

- ^{^[a]} signifies an additional producer.

== Personnel ==
- Jack Antonoff – programming, drums, bass, guitars, keyboards, piano, vocals, string arrangement ("I'm Ready to Move On/Wild Heart Reprise")
- Cyrus Grace Dunham – spoken word ("Wild Heart," "I'm Ready to Move On/Wild Heart Reprise," "Who I Want You to Love")
- John Hill – programming, drums, guitars, keyboards
- Vince Clarke – programming, keyboards
- Greg Kurstin – synths, electric guitars, drums
- Sara Quin – background vocals
- Jon Shiffman – drums
- Emile Haynie – programming
- Rachel Antonoff – background vocals
- Andrew Dost – background vocals
- Mae Whitman – background vocals
- Grimes – vocals
- Kurt Uenala – programming
- Lena Dunham – background vocals
- Yoko Ono – spoken word ("I'm Ready to Move On/Wild Heart Reprise")
- Little Ricky Antonoff – guitar
- Phillip Peterson – cello, string arrangement ("Who I Want You to Love")
- Victoria Parker – violin

== Charts ==
Strange Desire debuted at No. 11 on the US Billboard 200 chart, selling 21,000 copies in its first week of release.

Chart (2014)	Peak position
Canadian Albums (Billboard)	19
US Billboard 200	11
US Top Alternative Albums (Billboard)	2
US Top Rock Albums (Billboard)	2

== Release history ==
Region	Date	Format	Label
Australia	July 11, 2014	Digital download	RCA Records
United States	July 15, 2014	Digital download	RCA Records

== Terrible Thrills, Vol. 2 ==
Terrible Thrills, Vol. 2

Compilation album by Bleachers
- Released: September 25, 2015
- Genres: Indie pop; pop rock; electropop; synth-pop
- Label: RCA

Bleachers chronology
Strange Desire (2014)	Terrible Thrills, Vol. 2 (2015)	Gone Now (2017)

Terrible Thrills, Vol. 2 is the first compilation album by American indie pop act Bleachers, released on September 25, 2015, as a companion to Strange Desire. The album features every song from Bleachers' debut album covered by female artists, most of which signed with RCA Records. Its title references Terrible Thrills, Vol. 1, a compilation album released in 2010 by Antonoff's previous band Steel Train.

Track listing

No.	Title	Featured artist(s)	Length
1.	"Wild Heart"	Sara Bareilles	2:59
2.	"Rollercoaster"	Charli XCX	3:08
3.	"Shadow"	Carly Rae Jepsen	3:39
4.	"I Wanna Get Better"	Tinashe	3:04
5.	"Wake Me"	Lucius	3:17
6.	"Reckless Love"	Elle King	2:50
7.	"Take Me Away"	Brooke Candy; Rachel Antonoff	2:29
8.	"Like a River Runs"	Sia	3:58
9.	"You're Still a Mystery"	MØ	3:04
10.	"I'm Ready to Move On/Wild Heart Reprise"	Susanna Hoffs	4:18
11.	"Who I Want You to Love"	Natalie Maines	4:48

== A Stranger Desired ==
A Stranger Desired

Studio album by Bleachers
- Released: September 6, 2024
- Length: 35:21
- Label: Dirty Hit

Bleachers chronology
Bleachers (2024)	A Stranger Desired (2024)	Live From Madison Square Garden, NYC (2025)

Singles from A Stranger Desired
- 1. "Wild Heart" Released: August 2, 2024

A Stranger Desired is a 2024 re-recording of Strange Desire. Antonoff describes tracks on the album as being "reimagined without the armor [he] needed" when it was originally released a decade prior, featuring a more stripped back approach to production. The album's release was preceded by a new version of "Wild Heart", released on August 2, 2024. Corresponding with the original album's 10-year anniversary, the album was released on September 6, 2024 by Dirty Hit.

Track listing

No.	Title	Length
1.	"Wild Heart"	2:39
2.	"Rollercoaster"	3:00
3.	"Shadow"	4:17
4.	"I Wanna Get Better"	3:34
5.	"Wake Me"	2:50
6.	"Reckless Love"	2:30
7.	"Take Me Away"	1:47
8.	"Like a River Runs"	3:52
9.	"You're Still a Mystery"	3:13
10.	"I'm Ready to Move On / Wild Heart Reprise"	3:51
11.	"Who I Want"	3:58
Total length:		35:21
