= Bleachers (band) =

American rock band

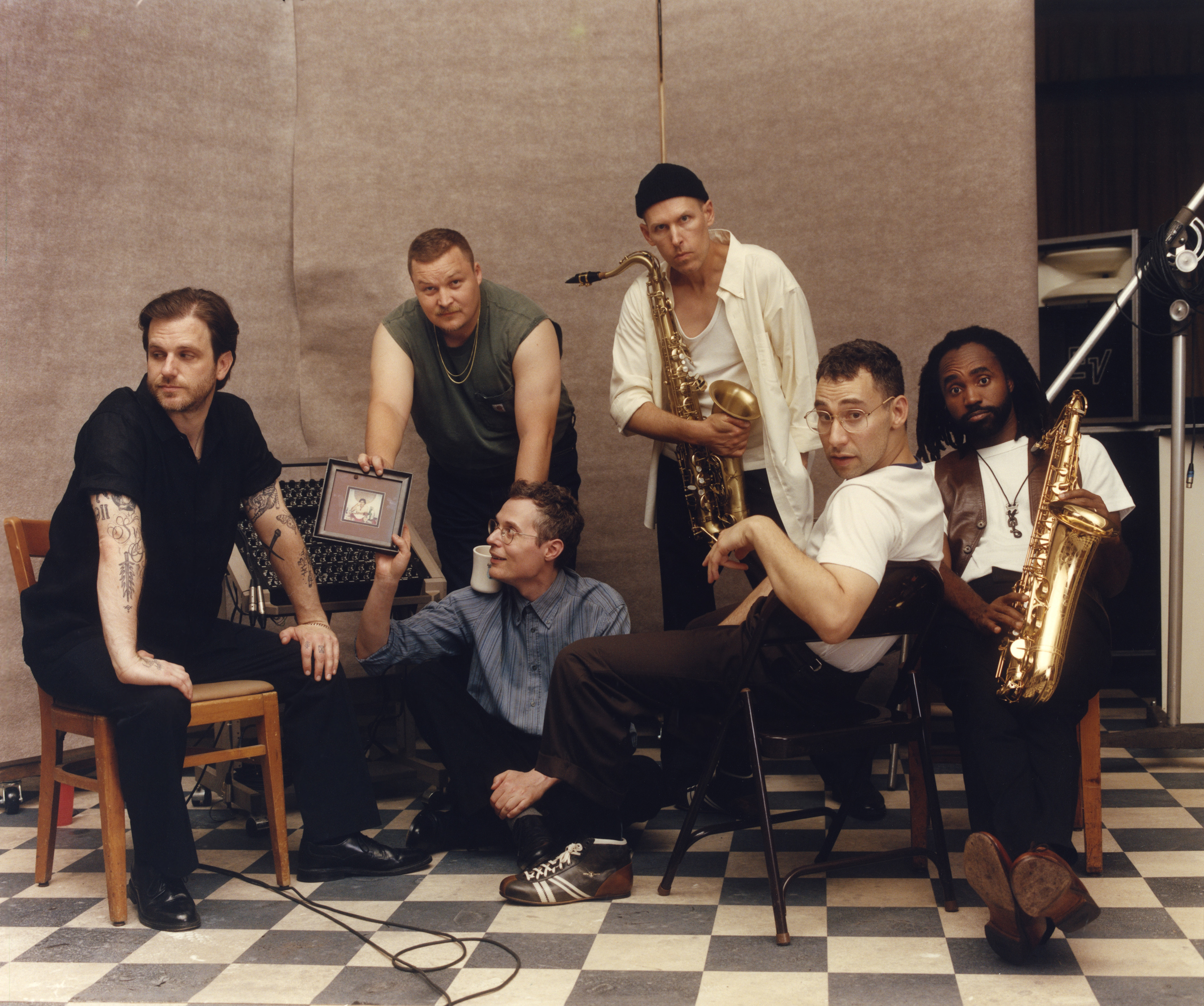
- Bleachers on set filming their music video "Modern Girl" in 2023

Background information
- Origin: Bergenfield, New Jersey, U.S.
- Genres: Indie pop; new wave; rock; alternative rock; synth-pop
- Years active: 2013–present
- Labels: RCA; Bleachers Band Recordings; Dirty Hit
- Members: Jack Antonoff; Zem Audu; Mikey Freedom Hart; Sean Hutchinson; Michael Riddleberger; Evan Smith
- Website: www.bleachersmusic.com

Bleachers is an American rock band from New Jersey, formed in 2013 by musician Jack Antonoff. Antonoff was the only permanent member of the group until 2023, when longtime touring musicians Mikey Freedom Hart, Sean Hutchinson, Evan Smith, Michael Riddleberger, and Zem Audu became official members.

Bleachers' early music was heavily influenced by the late 1980s and early 1990s, plus the high school-based films of John Hughes while still using modern production techniques.

Their debut single "I Wanna Get Better" was released in February 2014, followed by five studio albums: Strange Desire (2014), Gone Now (2017), Take the Sadness Out of Saturday Night (2021), Bleachers (2024), and Everyone for Ten Minutes (2026). The band has also released a re-recording of their debut album, titled, A Stranger Desired (2024)

== Career ==
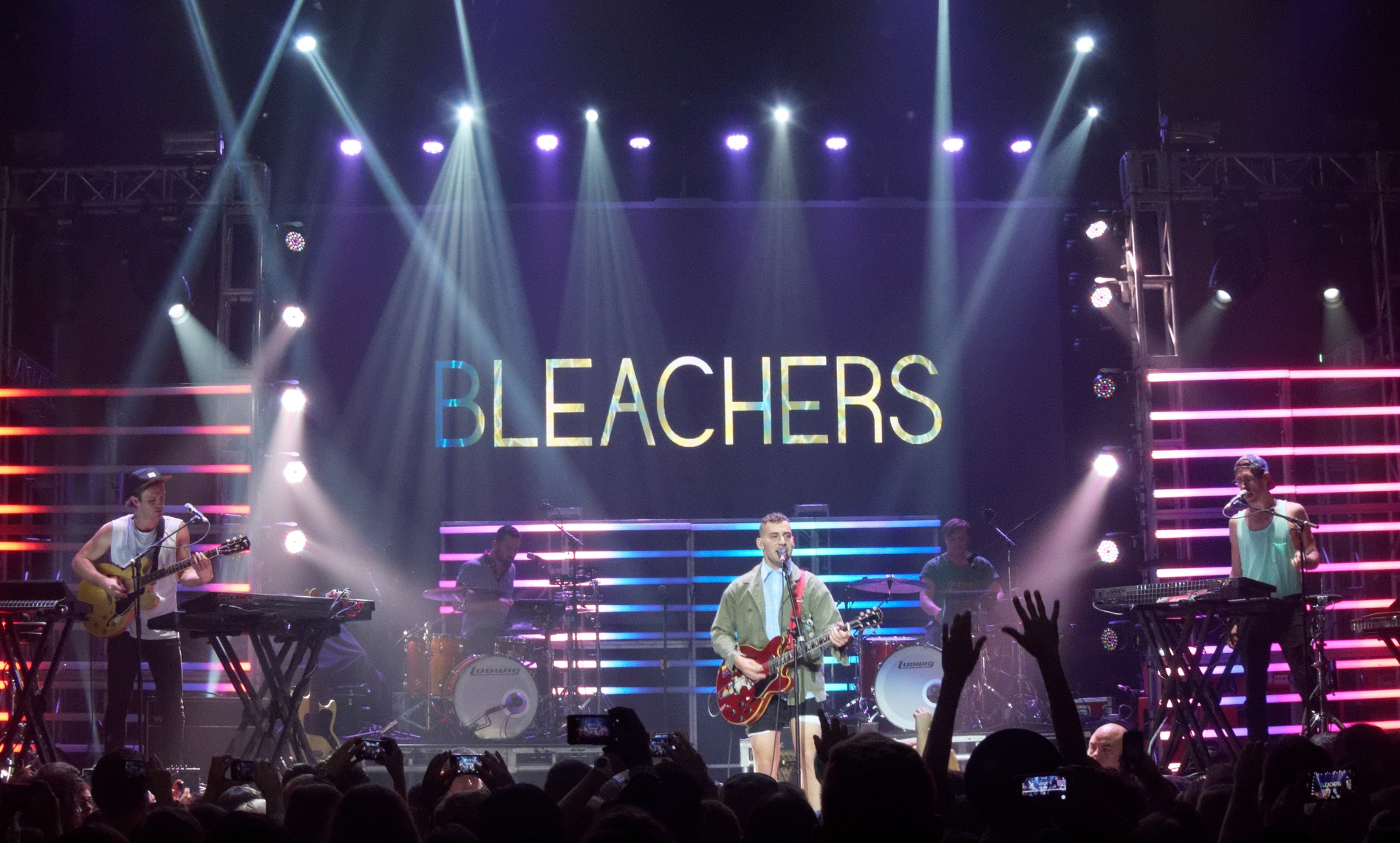
Bleachers in 2014

=== 2013–2016: Origins and Strange Desire ===
While on the road with his band, Fun, musician Jack Antonoff began working on a new project during his time in different cities. For about a year he kept the project a secret until February 18, 2014, when the first single "I Wanna Get Better" was released along with the launch of Bleachers' website, social media profiles, and a selection of tour dates. News of Bleachers was first publicly announced in a Facebook post by Brooklyn music studio Mission Sound in May 2013.

About making the first Bleachers album, Antonoff said, "I spent the past year working on the music but not talking about it, and eventually it became this psychotic alter-ego situation, where it was second nature to have this part of me that no one knew about. Except for a small group of people, most of which happened to be members of my immediate family, no one was aware that this music, or this album even existed... even though it existed so deeply to me." Antonoff also stated that Bleachers was never meant to be a departure from his position in Fun., and that he will remain in the band.

Bleachers' debut album Strange Desire was released July 10, 2014, from RCA Records. Variance Magazine called the single "Rollercoaster" a "brilliant summer anthem". Bleachers went on their debut Come Alive! tour, which features Night Terrors of 1927 and Joywave as opening acts, from March to April 2015. From there, they went on the Strange Desire World Tour from July to November of that same year. They juggled this with the Charli and Jack Do America Tour, a tour co-headlined by Bleachers and Charli XCX.

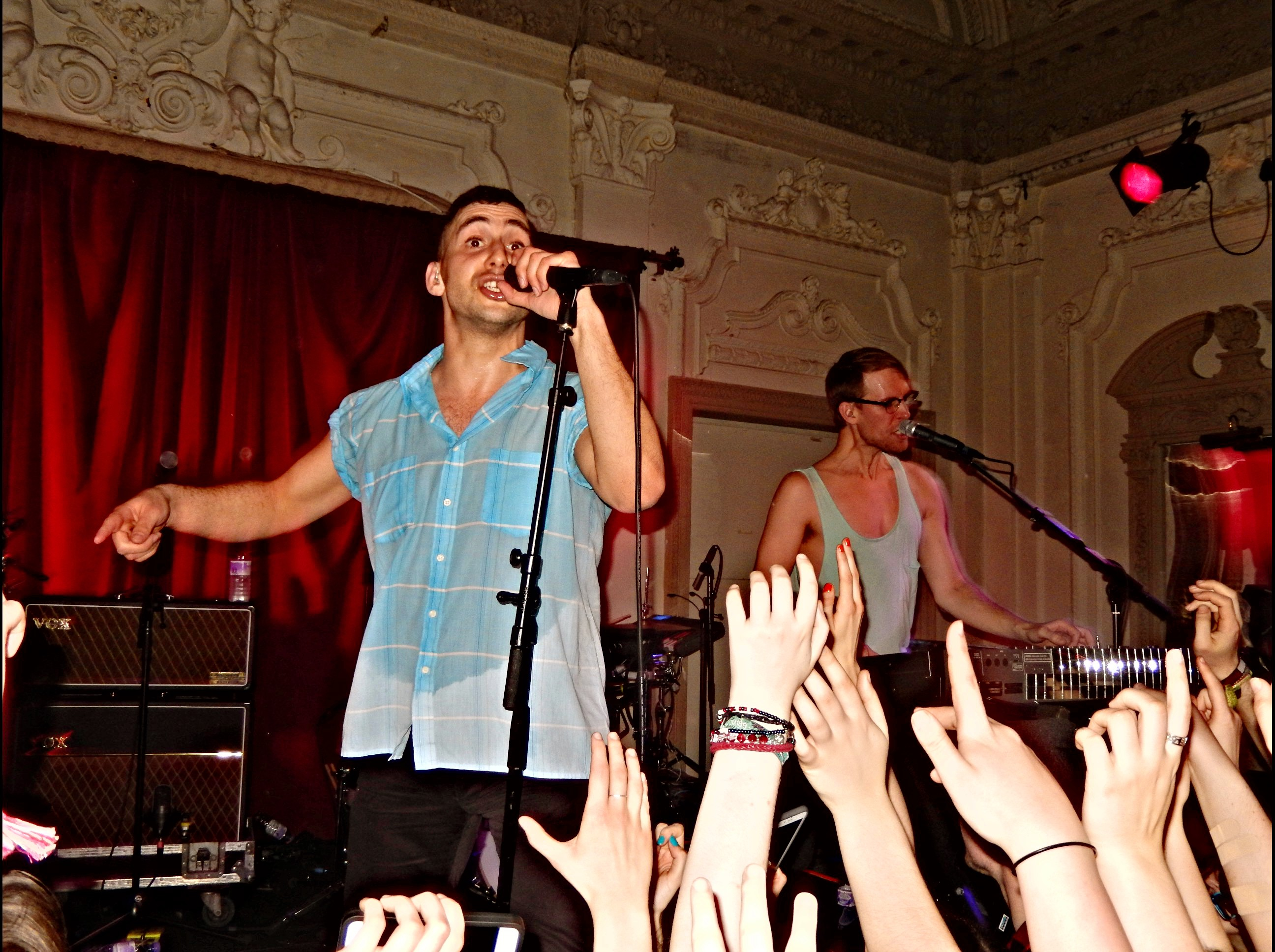
Bleachers performing in London in February 2015

On September 25, 2015, Bleachers released Terrible Thrills, Vol. 2, a sequel to Strange Desire. The album contained songs from Strange Desire being covered by numerous female artists with modified tunes. When asked about the album, Antonoff told Billboard “I hear my songs being sung by females before I change them and make them into my voice. The whole heart of this idea is for people to hear the album the way I hear it in my head, reinterpreted by the artists who sort of inspired it to be written in the first place.” Covers were contributed from artists such as Sara Bareilles, Charli XCX, and Sia. The band appeared as the fictional band Baby Goya and The Nuclear Winters in the 2015 film Hello, My Name Is Doris.

=== 2017–2019: Gone Now and Love, Simon ===
Bleachers' second album Gone Now was released June 2, 2017. Its lead single "Don't Take the Money" has been described by Atwood Magazine as "an epic uplifting pop-rock anthem ultimately about how when love is real, its worth everything that comes along with it". In celebration of the album release, he brought his childhood bedroom on tour with him. He had it dismantled and rebuilt inside of a portable trailer. During May and June concerts, fans could enter the "moving, living art exhibit" and listen to the album prior to its official release. Antonoff explained in a press release, saying "when I thought about where this album was coming from and what it’s kissing goodbye I thought of this room. I wished I could play the album for people who care about Bleachers in this space that it is coming from and leaving." The band was on its Gone Now Era: Part 1 tour from September to November 2017. The tour featured Tove Styrke, Bishop Briggs, and Tangerine as openers.

In September 2017, Bleachers performed on MTV Unplugged at The Stone Pony in Asbury Park, New Jersey. The live session was later released as an album, also entitled MTV Unplugged. The album features 11 tracks from both Gone Now and Strange Desire and was released November 10, 2017. Antonoff produced the soundtrack of Love, Simon, released on March 16, 2018. He contributed five songs, with four being credited to Bleachers—"Alfie's Song (Not So Typical Love Song)", "Rollercoaster", "Keeping a Secret", and "Wild Heart"— and one credited to his real name, a duet with MØ titled "Never Fall in Love". Throughout 2019, Bleachers released the third volume of Terrible Thrills in a series of four vinyl records, each featuring covers of songs from Gone Now by female artists as well as new demos by Bleachers.

=== 2020–2022: Take the Sadness Out of Saturday Night ===
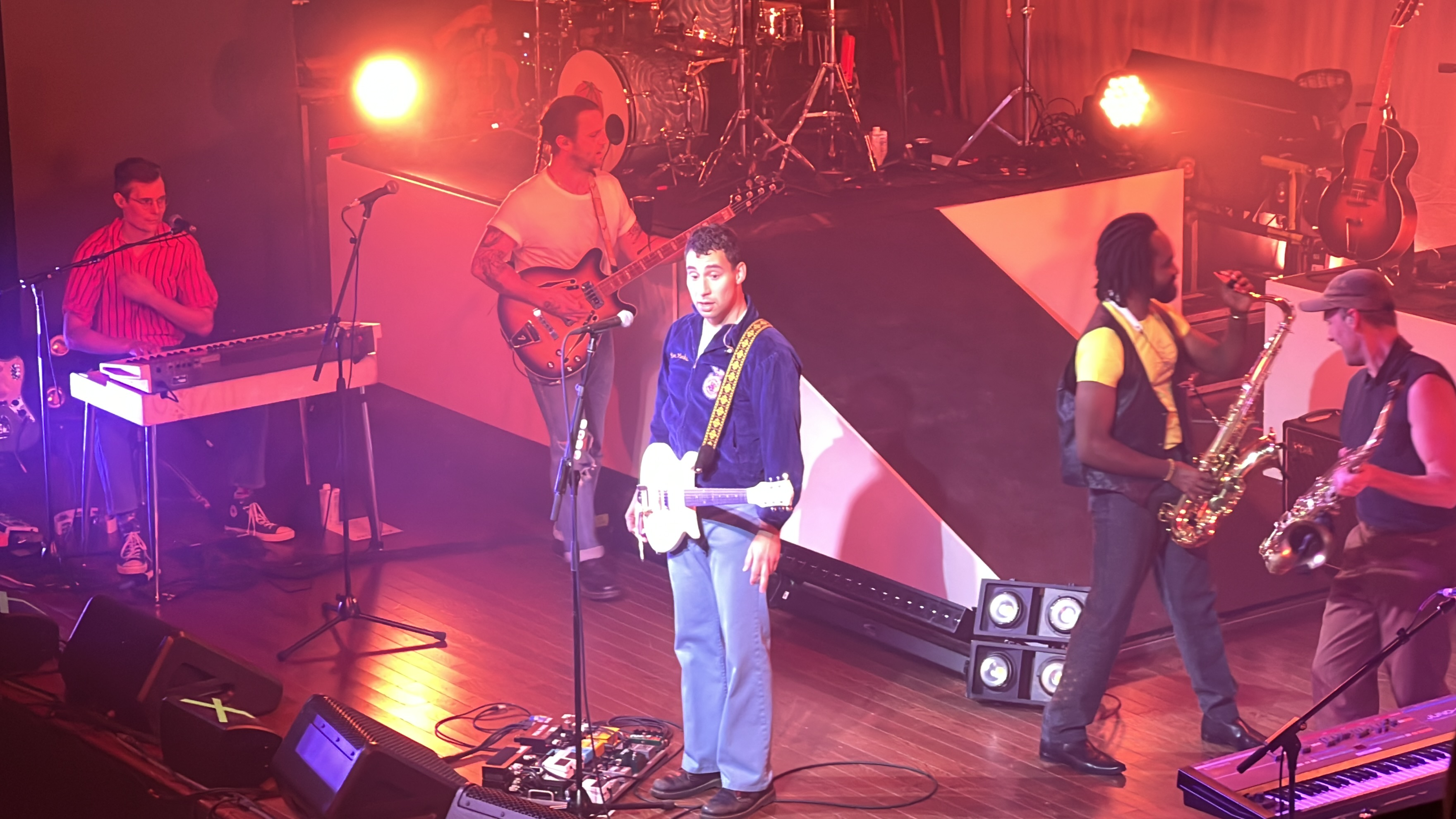
Bleachers performing in Minneapolis in October 2021

In late 2019, Antonoff began recording the third Bleachers album. During this time the band embarked on a three-day "mini-tour" called the "I Love Making This Album but I'm Also Losing My Mind in Here & Need to Come Out and Play" Tour. On January 6, 2020, Antonoff announced on Twitter that a new Bleachers album would come within the year. In May, Bleachers was featured on Carly Rae Jepsen's song "Comeback" which was the first official release of the band in nearly two years.

On November 16, 2020, Bleachers released the first two singles from Take the Sadness Out of Saturday Night, "45" and "Chinatown", the latter featuring Bruce Springsteen. The same day it was announced that the album would be released in 2021. "Stop Making This Hurt", the third single, was released on May 18, 2021. Take the Sadness Out of Saturday Night was released on July 30. Bleachers announced a North American tour for Take the Sadness Out of Saturday Night in May 2021. On October 28, Bleachers announced on Facebook that they will be performing two shows in March 2022 at Roadrunner, Boston dedicated to their first two albums: Strange Desire and Gone Now. On the January 15, 2022, episode of Saturday Night Live, which was hosted by Ariana DeBose, Bleachers replaced the originally scheduled Roddy Ricch.

Later that month they announced "The 2022 Tour" featuring openers August Ponthier, Blu DeTiger, The Lemon Twigs, Beabadoobee, Charly Bliss, and Wolf Alice. In November 2022, the band featured on a remix of Taylor Swift's "Anti-Hero".

=== 2023–present: Bleachers and Everyone for Ten Minutes ===
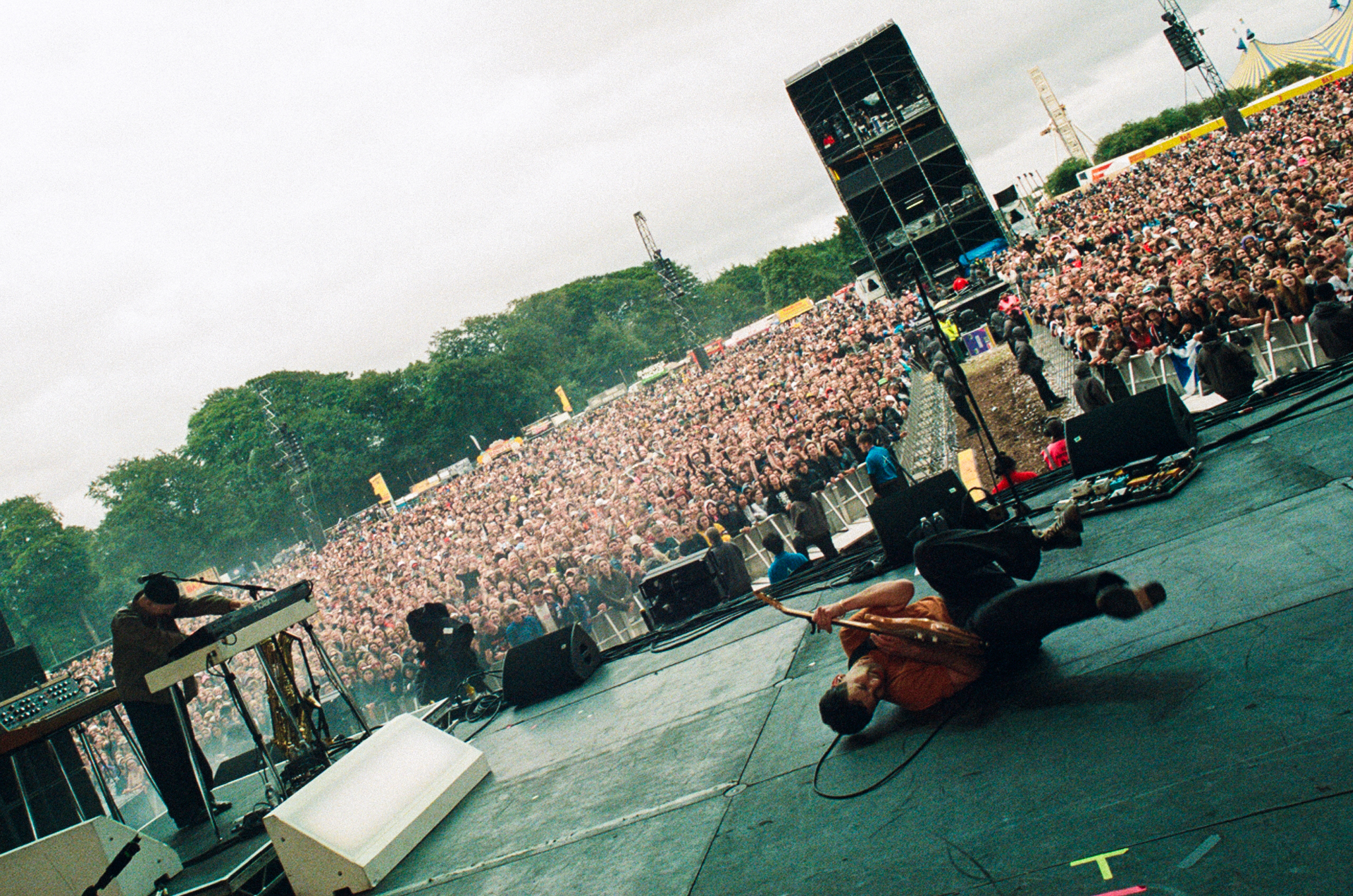
Bleachers at Leeds festival in 2024

Bleachers featured on Lana Del Rey's song "Margaret" from her album Did You Know That There's a Tunnel Under Ocean Blvd, released on March 24, 2023. In August 2023, the band signed a record deal with Dirty Hit and released the live album Live at Radio City Music Hall. On September 20, 2023, Bleachers released "Modern Girl" as the first single from their fourth studio album, referred to at the time as "B4" in promotional material. A music video for the song was released the same day. "Alma Mater" was released as the second single on November 15, and its music video was released on December 7. "Tiny Moves", the album's third single, was released on January 17, 2024. The fourth and final single from the album, "Me Before You", was released on February 22.

Bleachers' fourth studio album, titled Bleachers, was released on March 8, 2024. The album's 22-track deluxe edition was released on May 17, featuring eight additional songs. Bleachers explores themes of "love, marriage, grief, contentment, and maturity", mostly influenced by Antonoff's personal thoughts and experiences. On July 15, 2024, Antonoff announced on his social media that a "reimagined" version of Bleachers' debut album, Strange Desire, would be released under the title A Stranger Desired. The first single, "Wild Heart", was released on August 1, followed by the full album release on September 6.

The band kicked off their 2024 "From the Studio to the Stage" tour with a sold-out leg across the United Kingdom. The tour also featured shows throughout the United States, Europe, and Japan, including sold-out dates at Red Rocks Amphitheatre and their largest headline show to date at Madison Square Garden. On November 13, 2024, Bleachers released their single "Merry Christmas, Please Don't Call", two years after premiering it at the Ally Coalition Talent Show. It became their first song to reach the national chart of the United Kingdom, peaking at number 77. The band also released the continuous live album From the Studio to the Stage, featuring live recordings of "Margaret" (with Jeff Tweedy), "Me Before You", "Rollercoaster", "Tiny Moves" (with Carly Rae Jepsen), "Merry Christmas, Please Don't Call", "Royal Love", and "91". The group's fifth studio album, Everyone for Ten Minutes, was released on May 22, 2026; its lead single, "You and Forever", was released on February 11. On August 28, 2026, Bruce Springsteen joined the band onstage at the The Stone Pony Summer Stage in Asbury Park, New Jersey for a cover of Tom Waits' Jersey Girl and the song Chinatown,earlier that day, New Jersey Transit Rail announced a renaming of the "North Jersey Coast Line" to the "Bleachers Coast Line."

== Band members ==
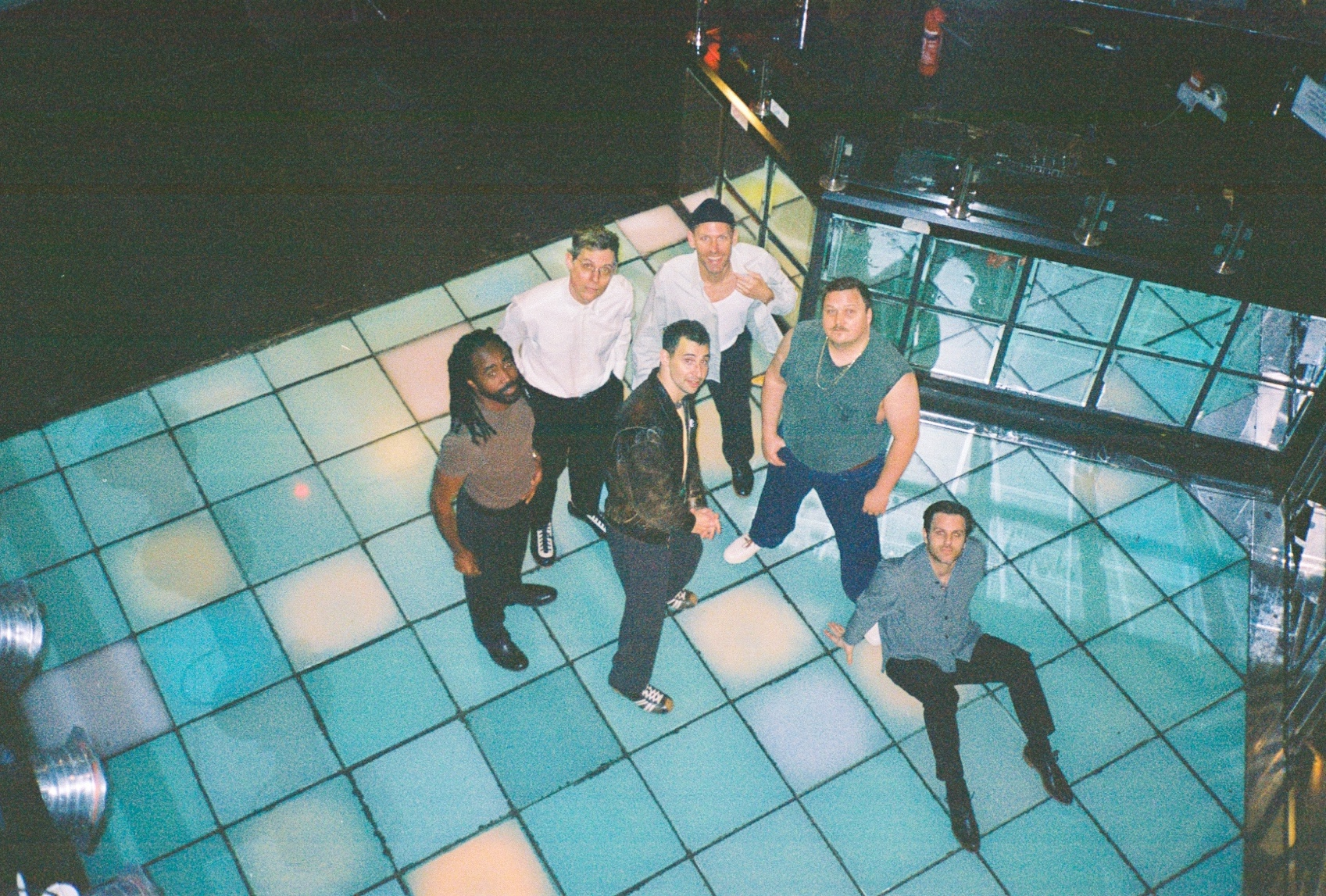
Bleachers at PRYZM Kingston in 2024

Current

- Jack Antonoff – lead vocals, guitar, bass guitar, keyboards, programming, cello, synthesizers, samples (2014–present)
- Mikey Freedom Hart – guitar, keyboards, synthesizers, piano, bass guitar, backing vocals (2023–present; touring 2014–2023)
- Sean Hutchinson – drums, sampler, synthesizers, bass guitar, backing vocals (2023–present; touring 2014–2023)
- Evan Smith – keyboards, synthesizers, saxophone, flute, guitar, backing vocals (2023–present; touring 2014–2023)
- Mike Riddleberger – drums, sampler, keyboards, backing vocals (2023–present; touring 2016–2023)
- Zem Audu – keyboards, saxophone, guitar, bass guitar, backing vocals (2023–present; touring 2021–2023)

Former touring member

- Jon Shiffman – drums, sampler, backing vocals (2014–2015)

== Discography ==
Bleachers discography
- Studio albums: 5
- EPs: 2
- Live albums: 3
- Compilation albums: 2
- Singles: 15
- Promotional singles: 5

=== Studio albums ===
List of studio albums, with selected chart positions
Title	Album details	Peak chart positions									
Title	Album details	US	US Rock	AUS	BEL (FL)	CAN	FRA Phys.	NZ Heat	SCO	UK	UK Indie
Strange Desire	Released: July 10, 2014 (US); Label: RCA; Formats: LP, CD, digital download, streaming	11	2	— (Note: Strange Desire did not enter the ARIA Albums Chart, but peaked at number 10 on the ARIA Hitseekers Albums Chart.)	—	19	—	—	—	186	—
Gone Now	Released: June 2, 2017 (US); Label: RCA; Formats: LP, CD, digital download, streaming	44	9	— (Note: Gone Now did not enter the ARIA Albums Chart, but peaked at number 9 on the ARIA Hitseekers Albums Chart.)	—	92	—	6	—	—	—
Take the Sadness Out of Saturday Night	Released: July 30, 2021 (US); Label: RCA; Formats: LP, CD, digital download, streaming	27	3	—	—	69	—	—	—	— (Note: Take the Sadness Out of Saturday Night did not enter the UK Albums chart, but peaked at number 24 on the UK Album Downloads Chart.)	—
Bleachers	Released: March 8, 2024; Label: Bleachers Band Recordings, Dirty Hit; Formats: LP, CD, cassette, digital download, streaming	62	13	—	155	—	—	—	3	5	1
A Stranger Desired	Released: September 6, 2024; Label: Bleachers Band Recordings, Dirty Hit	— (Note: A Stranger Desired did not enter the Billboard 200, but peaked at number 39 on the US Top Current Albums Chart.)	—	—	—	—	—	—	—	—	43
Everyone for Ten Minutes	Released: May 22, 2026; Label: Bleachers Band Recordings, Dirty Hit; Formats: LP, CD, cassette, digital download, streaming	148	36	73	—	—	176	—	4	18	2
"—" denotes a recording that did not chart or was not released in that territory.

=== Live albums ===
List of live albums, with selected chart positions
Title	Album details	Peak chart positions		
Title	Album details	US Current	US Alt. Sales	US Rock Sales
MTV Unplugged	Released: November 10, 2017 (US); Label: RCA; Formats: LP, digital download, streaming	87	21	45
Live at Electric Lady	Release: November 4, 2021; Label: RCA; Formats: digital download, streaming, LP	—	—	—
Live at Radio City	Released: August 25, 2023; Label: Bleachers Band Recordings, Dirty Hit; Formats: digital download, streaming	—	—	—
Live from Madison Square Garden, NYC	Released: October 31, 2025; Label: Bleachers Band Recordings, Dirty Hit; Formats: digital download, streaming, LP	—	—	—
"—" denotes a recording that did not chart or was not released in that territory.

=== Compilation albums ===
List of compilation albums
Title	Album details
Terrible Thrills, Vol. 2	Released: September 25, 2015 (US); Label: RCA; Formats: LP, digital download, streaming
Terrible Thrills, Vol. 3	Released: March 16, 2019 (US); Label: RCA; Formats: 4 × 7-inch vinyl

=== EPs ===
List of EPs
Title	EP details
Spotify Sessions	Released: August 6, 2014 (US); Label: RCA; Format: Streaming
Strange Desire: The Demos	Released: November 28, 2014 (US); Label: RCA; Formats: CD, Digital download, LP

=== Singles ===
List of singles, with selected chart positions, showing year released and album name
Title	Year	Peak chart positions										Certifications	Album
Title	Year	US Bub.	US Adult	US Rock	CAN Rock	IDN	IRE	JPN	PHI	POR	UK	Certifications	Album
"I Wanna Get Better"	2014	1	—	10	21	—	—	81	—	—	—	RIAA: Platinum	Strange Desire
"Shadow"	2014	—	—	—	—	—	—	—	—	—	—		Strange Desire
"Rollercoaster"	2014	—	— (Note: "Rollercoaster" did not enter the Adult Pop Airplay chart, but did peak at number 26 on the Adult Alternative Airplay chart.)	19	27	—	—	—	—	—	—	RIAA: Gold	Strange Desire
"Like a River Runs"	2014	— (Note: "Like a River Runs" did not enter the Billboard Hot 100 chart, but peaked at number 2 on the Hot Singles Sales chart, a component of the Hot 100.)	—	— (Note: "Like a River Runs" did not enter the main Hot Rock & Alternative Songs chart, but did peak at number 40 on the Rock Digital Songs chart.)	—	—	—	—	—	—	—		Strange Desire
"Entropy" (with Grimes)	2015	—	—	—	—	—	—	—	—	—	—		Non-album single
"Don't Take the Money"	2017	— (Note: "Don't Take the Money" did not enter the Billboard Hot 100 chart, but peaked at number 10 on the Hot Singles Sales chart, a component of the Hot 100.)	22	12	47	—	—	—	—	—	—	RIAA: Gold	Gone Now
"Hate That You Know Me"	2017	—	—	50	—	—	—	—	—	—	—		Gone Now
"Everybody Lost Somebody"	2017	—	—	—	—	—	—	—	—	—	—		Gone Now
"I Miss Those Days"	2017	—	—	— (Note: "I Miss Those Days" did not enter the US Hot Rock & Alternative Songs chart, but peaked at number 36 on the Rock & Alternative Airplay chart.)	—	—	—	—	—	—	—		Gone Now
"Alfie's Song (Not So Typical Love Song)"	2018	—	31	— (Note: "Alfie's Song (Not So Typical Love Song)" did not enter the US Hot Rock & Alternative Songs chart, but peaked at number 36 on the Rock & Alternative Airplay chart.)	—	—	—	—	—	—	—		Love, Simon
"45"	2020	—	—	—	—	—	—	—	—	—	—		Take the Sadness Out of Saturday Night
"Chinatown" (featuring Bruce Springsteen)	2020	—	— (Note: "Chinatown" did not enter the Adult Pop Airplay chart, but did peak at number 14 on the Adult Alternative Airplay chart.)	47	—	—	—	—	—	—	—		Take the Sadness Out of Saturday Night
"Stop Making This Hurt"	2021	—	36	44	43	—	—	—	—	—	—		Take the Sadness Out of Saturday Night
"How Dare You Want More"	2021	—	— (Note: "How Dare You Want More" did not enter the Adult Pop Airplay chart, but did peak at number 18 on the Adult Alternative Airplay chart.)	— (Note: "How Dare You Want More" did not enter the US Hot Rock & Alternative Songs chart, but peaked at number 38 on the Rock & Alternative Airplay chart.)	—	—	—	—	—	—	—		Take the Sadness Out of Saturday Night
"Dreamsicle" (Note: "Dreamsicle" was released as a split 7-inch single alongside "45" by Jason Isbell)	2021	—	—	—	—	—	—	—	—	—	—		Non-album single
"Modern Girl"	2023	—	— (Note: "Modern Girl" did not enter the Adult Pop Airplay chart, but did peak at number five on the Adult Alternative Airplay chart.)	— (Note: "Modern Girl" did not enter the US Hot Rock & Alternative Songs chart, but peaked at number 13 on the Rock & Alternative Airplay chart.)	—	—	—	—	—	—	— (Note: "Modern Girl" did not enter the UK Singles chart, but peaked at number 17 on the Uk Physical Singles chart.)		Bleachers
"Alma Mater"	2023	—	—	—	—	—	—	—	—	—	—		Bleachers
"Tiny Moves"	2024	—	— (Note: "Tiny Moves" did not enter the Adult Pop Airplay chart, but did peak at number 17 on the Adult Alternative Airplay chart.)	— (Note: "Tiny Moves" did not enter the US Hot Rock & Alternative Songs chart, but peaked at number 28 on the Rock & Alternative Airplay chart.)	—	—	—	—	—	—	— (Note: "Tiny Moves" did not enter the UK Singles chart, but peaked at number 18 on the Uk Physical Singles chart.)		Bleachers
"Me Before You"	2024	—	—	—	—	—	—	—	—	—	—		Bleachers
"Wild Heart"	2024	—	—	—	—	—	—	—	—	—	—		A Stranger Desired
"Merry Christmas, Please Don't Call"	2024	—	—	18	—	20	44	—	69	147	65		Non-album single
"You and Forever"	2026	—	— (Note: "You and Forever" did not enter the Adult Pop Airplay chart, but did peak at number eight on the Adult Alternative Airplay chart.)	— (Note: "You and Forever" did not enter the main Hot Rock & Alternative Songs chart, but did peak at number 34 on the Rock & Alternative Airplay chart.)	—	—	—	—	—	—	—		Everyone for Ten Minutes
"Dirty Wedding Dress"	2026	—	—	—	—	—	—	—	—	—	—		Everyone for Ten Minutes
"The Van"	2026	—	—	—	—	—	—	—	—	—	— (Note: "The Van" did not enter the UK Singles chart, but peaked at number nine on the Uk Physical Singles chart.)		Everyone for Ten Minutes
"I'm Not Joking"	2026	—	—	—	—	—	—	—	—	—	—		Everyone for Ten Minutes
"Caught Myself Believing"	2026	—	—	—	—	—	—	—	—	—	—		Practical Magic 2 Soundtrack
"Blood Brothers"	2026	—	—	—	—	—	—	—	—	—	—		Non-album single
"—" denotes a recording that did not chart or was not released in that territory.

=== Promotional singles ===
Title	Year	Album
"Dear Prudence" (Beatles cover)	2015	Non-album promotional singles
"Jack HH"	2017	Non-album promotional singles
"I Miss Those Days"(Live)	2017	MTV Unplugged
"At My Most Beautiful" (R.E.M. cover)	2020	Non-album promotional single
"Secret Life" (featuring Lana Del Rey)	2021	Take the Sadness Out of Saturday Night

=== Other charted songs ===
Title	Year	Peak chart positions			Certifications	Album
Title	Year	US AAA	US Alt	US Rock	Certifications	Album
"Margaret" (Lana Del Rey featuring Bleachers)	2023	—	18	43	BPI: Silver; PMB: 2× Platinum; RMNZ: Gold; ZPAV: Gold	Did You Know That There's a Tunnel Under Ocean Blvd
"We Should Talk"	2026	17	— (Note: "We Should Talk" did not enter the US Hot Alternative Songs chart, but peaked at number 33 on the Alternative Airplay chart.)	—		Everyone for Ten Minutes
"—" denotes a recording that did not chart or was not released in that territory.

=== Guest appearances ===
Guest appearances credited to Bleachers
Title	Year	Other Artist(s)	Album
"Alfie's Song (Not So Typical Love Song)"	2018	—N/a	Love, Simon (Original Motion Picture Soundtrack)
"Keeping a Secret"	2018	—N/a	Love, Simon (Original Motion Picture Soundtrack)
"Comeback"	2020	Carly Rae Jepsen	Dedicated Side B
"Instant Karma!"	2022	—N/a	Minions: Rise of Gru (Original Motion Picture Soundtrack)
"Anti-Hero (Bleachers remix)"	2022	Taylor Swift	Non-album remix of a single
"Margaret"	2023	Lana Del Rey	Did You Know That There's a Tunnel Under Ocean Blvd

== Tours ==
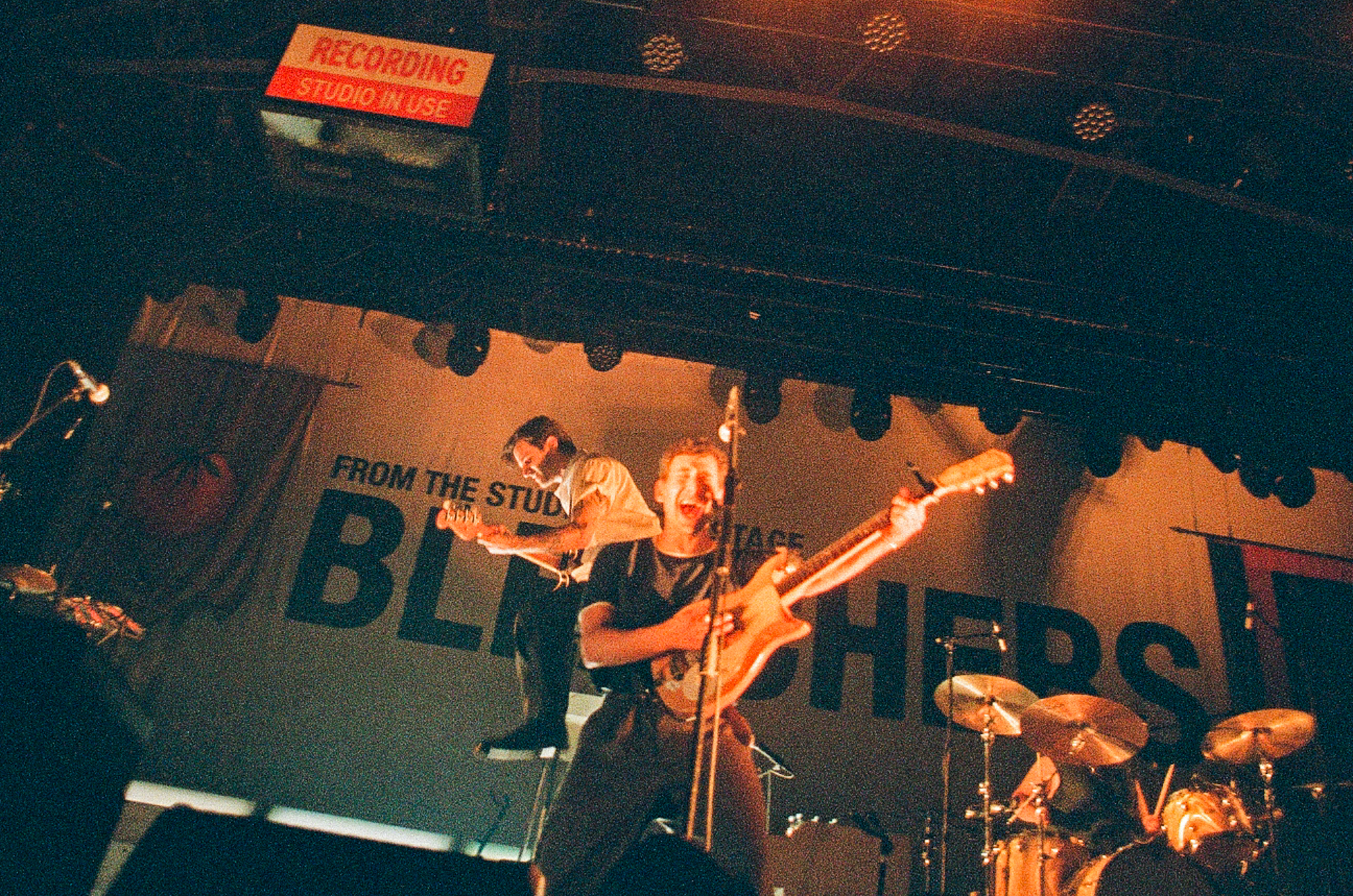
Bleachers in Cologne in 2024

=== Headlining ===
- Strange Desire World Tour (2014)
- Come Alive! Tour (2015)
- Charli and Jack Do America Tour (with Charli XCX) (2015)
- Gone Now Era Tour (2017–2018)
- I Love Making This Album but I'm Also Losing My Mind in Here & Need to Come Out and Play Mini-Tour (2019)
- Take the Sadness Out of Saturday Night Tour (2021)
- How Dare You Want Tour (2022)
- From The Studio To The Stage Tour (2024)
- Bleachers Forever World Tour (2026)

=== Opening ===
- Tour Four (with Paramore) (2018)
- At Their Very Best (2023, Finsbury Park)
