= Gone Now =

2017 studio album by Bleachers

Studio album by Bleachers
- Released: June 2, 2017
- Genres: Synth-pop; new wave; R&B; pop rock; indie pop; electropop; heartland rock; alternative dance
- Length: 40:34
- Label: RCA
- Producers: Emile Haynie; Greg Kurstin; Jack Antonoff; John Hill; Nineteen85; Organized Noize; Sounwave; Vince Clarke

Bleachers chronology
Terrible Thrills, Vol. 2 (2015)	Gone Now (2017)	Terrible Thrills, Vol. 3 (2019)

Singles from Gone Now
- 1. "Don't Take the Money" Released: March 31, 2017; 2. "Hate That You Know Me" Released: April 17, 2017; 3. "Everybody Lost Somebody" Released: May 12, 2017; 4. "I Miss Those Days" Released: October 17, 2017

Gone Now is the second studio album by American indie pop act Bleachers, released on June 2, 2017. The album deals with themes of growing old, as well as struggling with losing people in life, told over the course of day and a lifetime. It takes inspiration from the pop sounds of the 1980s, mixed with a modern view.

== Artwork ==
The cover features Antonoff wearing a white prince outfit with his hand placed over his heart in a Polaroid-style frame. According to Antonoff, the photo of himself on the cover is a view of what he might look like if he were dead. In a series of videos breaking down the album, he stated:

That's why on the cover -- everyone's like, "what are you, a dictator?" And I'm like no, man, I'm dead. I'm supposed to be dead. I thought if I was dead, what would I look like? I'd be black and white, and I'd be regal, and dressed up. That's the picture you'd have on a mantel if I wasn't here anymore.

The outfit was also used on the tour for Gone Now.

== Reception ==
Professional ratings
Aggregate scores
Source	Rating
AnyDecentMusic?	6.2/10
Metacritic	71/100
Review scores
Source	Rating
AllMusic	4/5 stars
The A.V. Club	B−
Consequence of Sound	C−
Entertainment Weekly	A−
Exclaim!	7/10
NME	4/5 stars
Pitchfork	6.1/10
PopMatters	7/10
Q	3/5 stars
Rolling Stone	3.5/5 stars

Gone Now received generally favorable reviews from music critics. On Metacritic, which assigns a normalized rating out of 100 to reviews from mainstream publications, the album received a weighted average score of 71 based on 12 reviews.

Heather Phares of AllMusic gave the album a positive review, highlighting its exploration of nostalgia, personal loss, and emotional vulnerability. She praised the album's combination of personal songwriting and polished pop production, describing it as one of Antonoff's more immersive musical projects.

Jonathan Bernstein of Entertainment Weekly awarded the album an A−, praising Antonoff's artistic development and the record's cohesive exploration of grief and memory. The review highlighted the album's stronger conceptual direction compared with Bleachers' debut, Strange Desire (2014).

In a more mixed assessment, Sam Sodomsky of Pitchfork awarded the album 6.1 out of 10. He praised the anthemic qualities of songs such as "Don't Take the Money" and "Everybody Lost Somebody", as well as the more restrained arrangements of "All My Heroes" and "Nothing Is U". However, he criticized the album's uneven songwriting, repetitive musical ideas, and lack of lyrical depth.

Overall, critical responses frequently highlighted the album's ambitious production and emotional themes, while differing over the effectiveness of its songwriting and conceptual execution.

== Accolades ==
Publication	Accolade	Year	Rank	Ref.
The Independent	The 30 Best Albums of 2017	2017	27	
NME	NME's Albums of the Year 2017	2017	26	

== Track listing ==
No.	Title	Writer(s)	Producer(s)	Length
1.	"Dream of Mickey Mantle"	Jack Antonoff; Tom Krell	Antonoff	3:10
2.	"Goodmorning"	Antonoff; Emile Haynie	Antonoff; Haynie^{[a]}; Organized Noize^{[b]}	3:13
3.	"Hate That You Know Me"	Antonoff; Julia Michaels	Antonoff; Greg Kurstin^{[a]}	3:06
4.	"Don't Take the Money"	Antonoff; Ella Yelich-O'Connor	Antonoff; Kurstin^{[a]}; Vince Clarke^{[b]}	3:36
5.	"Everybody Lost Somebody"	Antonoff; Evan Smith	Antonoff; Haynie^{[b]}	3:55
6.	"All My Heroes"	Antonoff	Antonoff	3:04
7.	"Let's Get Married"	Antonoff; Smith; Paul Jefferies	Antonoff; Nineteen85	3:06
8.	"Goodbye"	Antonoff	Antonoff; Sounwave^{[b]}; John Hill^{[b]}	2:57
9.	"I Miss Those Days"	Antonoff	Antonoff; Kurstin^{[b]}	3:38
10.	"Nothing Is U"	Antonoff	Antonoff	2:23
11.	"I'm Ready to Move On/Mickey Mantle Reprise"	Antonoff; Sam Dew	Antonoff; Organized Noize^{[b]}	4:24
12.	"Foreign Girls"	Antonoff	Antonoff; Sounwave^{[b]}	4:01
Total length:				40:34

Notes

- ^{^[a]} signifies a co-producer
- ^{^[b]} signifies an additional producer

== Personnel ==
Musicians

- Jack Antonoff - lead vocals
- Evan Smith - background vocals (tracks 1 & 7), saxophone (tracks 1, 2, 9, 11 & 12) & horns (tracks 5, 7 & 10)
- Camilla Venturini - speaking voice (tracks 1, 5, 6 & 11)
- Nico Segal - trumpet (tracks 2, 8, 9 & 12)
- Lena Dunham - background vocals (tracks 2, 7 & 8)
- Andrew Dost - background vocals (track 2)
- Alfie Silbert - crying (track 2)
- Evan Winiker - bass (track 3)
- Sean Hutchinson - drums (tracks 3, 5 & 11)
- Lorde - background vocals (tracks 3 & 4)
- Carly Rae Jepsen - background vocals (track 3)
- Julia Michaels - background vocals (track 3)
- Sam Dew - background vocals (tracks 3, 8, 11 & 12)
- Mikey Freedom Hart - guitar (tracks 4, 7 & 11), piano (track 8)
- Greg Kurstin - keyboard (track 4), LinnDrum (track 4)
- Mike Riddleberger - drums (track 7)
- MØ - background vocals (track 7)
- Nicole Atkins - background vocals (track 9)
- Phillip Peterson - strings (track 10)
- Victoria Parker - strings (track 10)
- Sleepy Brown - background vocals (track 11)

Production

- Jack Antonoff - production, mixing (tracks 1, 3, 8 & 11)
- Laura Sisk - vocal production (tracks 1–3, 5–12), engineering
- Emile Haynie - co-production (track 2), additional production (track 5)
- Organized Noize - additional production (track 2 & 11)
- Tom Elmhirst - mixing (tracks 2, 5, 6, 10 & 12)
- Greg Kurstin - co-production (tracks 3 & 4), engineering (track 4), additional production (track 9)
- Vince Clarke - additional production (track 4)
- Julian Burg - additional engineering (track 4)
- Alex Pasco - additional engineering (track 4)
- Serban Ghenea - mixing (tracks 4 & 7)
- Nineteen85 - production (track 7)
- Sounwave - additional production (track 8 & 12)
- John Hill - additional production (track 8)
- Neal Avron - mixing (track 9)

== Charts ==
Chart (2017)	Peak position
Canadian Albums (Billboard)	92
New Zealand Heatseekers Albums (RMNZ)	6
US Billboard 200	44
US Top Alternative Albums (Billboard)	6
US Top Rock Albums (Billboard)	9
US Indie Store Album Sales (Billboard)	9

== Terrible Thrills, Vol. 3 ==
Terrible Thrills, Vol. 3

Compilation album by Bleachers
- Released: March 2019 (First 7"); April 2019 (Second 7"); May 2019 (Third 7"); June 2019 (Fourth 7")
- Label: RCA

Bleachers chronology
Gone Now (2017)	Terrible Thrills, Vol. 3 (2019)	Take the Sadness Out of Saturday Night (2021)

Terrible Thrills, Vol. 3 is the second compilation album by American indie pop act Bleachers, released as a companion to Gone Now by RCA Records exclusively as a set of four 7-inch singles. The first single, a cover of "Let's Get Married" performed by Mitski, was released in March 2019; all subsequent singles were released on a monthly basis thereafter. Following Terrible Thrills, Vol. 2 (2015), it is a cover album composed of songs from Bleachers' second studio album covered by female artists, as well as rare songs and demos.

=== Track listing ===
Unless otherwise indicated, all tracks are performed by Bleachers.

First 7"
No.	Title	Length
1.	"Let's Get Married" (performed by Mitski)
2.	"Mickey Mantle Comes Alive"

Second 7"
No.	Title	Length
1.	"I Miss the Last Days of Disco"
2.	"Don't Take the Money" (Demo)
3.	"All My Heroes / Hate That You Slow Me Down" (performed by Muna)

Third 7"
No.	Title	Length
1.	"Everybody Lost Somebody" (performed by Julien Baker)
2.	"Goodmorning After a Breakup / Vietnam Documentary"

Fourth 7"
No.	Title	Length
1.	"Foreign Girls" (performed by Ani DiFranco)
2.	"And, Nothing Is You"
