= Lacs de Morgon =

Group of lakes in the Tinée valley, Alpes-Maritimes, France

Lakes of Morgon
- Lacs de Morgon (French)
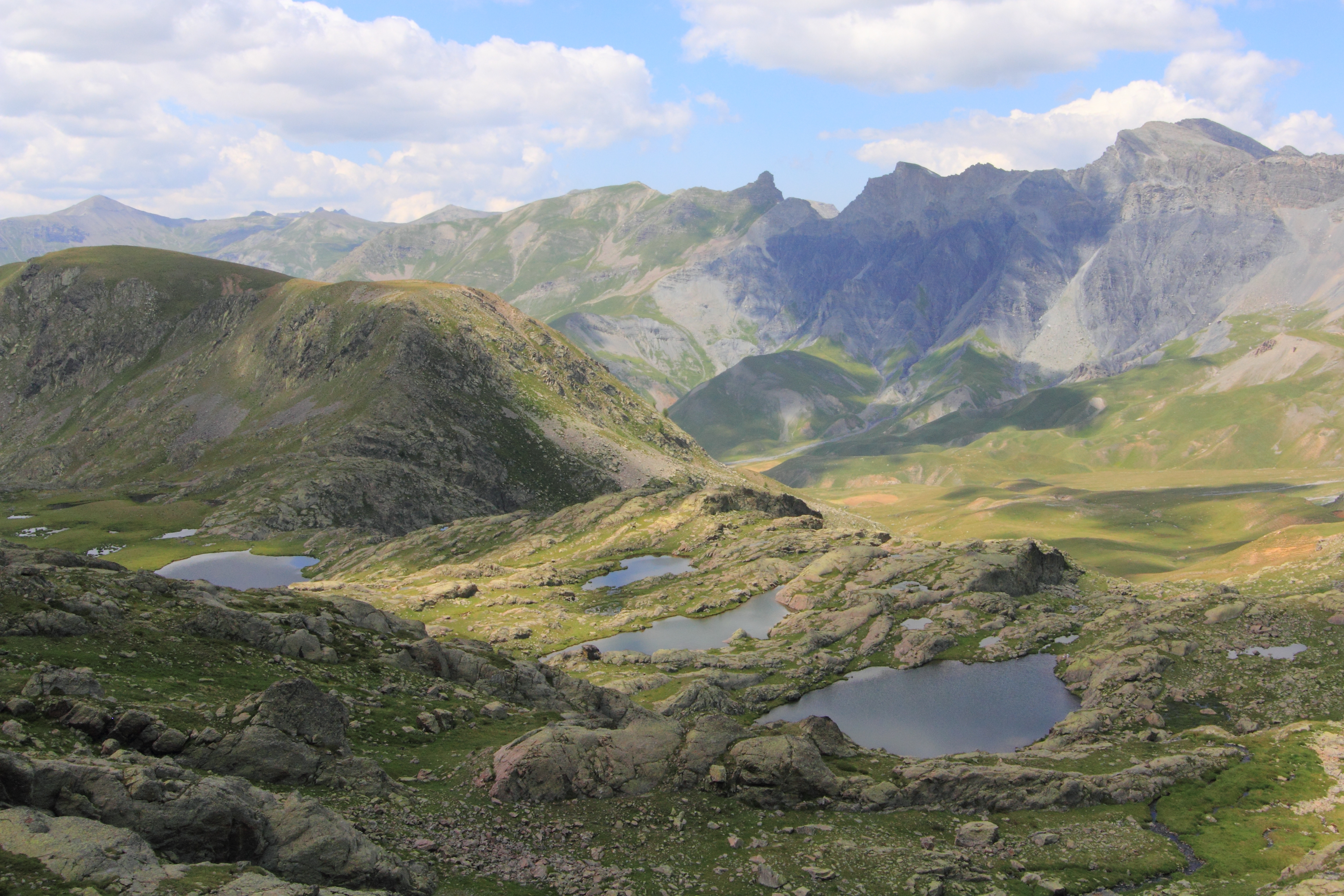
- Lakes of Morgon (Tinée, French Alps). Left: the Big Lake of Morgon (2427 m); center: the Median Lake (2470 m) and the Higher Lake (2480 m).

- Location within Alps
- Location: Alpes-Maritimes, Alps
- Coordinates: 44.3356°N 6.9092°E
- Basin countries: France
- Surface elevation: 2,427 m (7,963 ft), 2,470 m (8,100 ft) and 2,480 m (8,140 ft)

The lakes of Morgon (French: Lacs de Morgon) are a group of lakes in the Tinée valley, Alpes-Maritimes, Alps, France. The first lake is the Big Lake of Morgon at an elevation of 2427 m. The other major lakes are the Median Lake (2470 m) and the Higher Lake (2480 m).

Of note, three other lakes can be found in the vicinity of the Morgon lakes: the lakes Les Laussets.

== Itinerary ==
On the way of the Col de la Bonette from the Tinée side, stop at the Camp des Fourches, and go to the Col des Fourches. Follow the GR 5 to go down in the ravin de Cougnas. Leave the GR at tag 37 (2100 m), and follow on the right the small footpath and the cairns along the Salso Moreno torrent. Enter a small rocky gorge on the right, and reach the Big Lake of Morgon. From there, walk north-east to reach the Median and Higher Lakes.

== Gallery ==
Detailed views of each lake

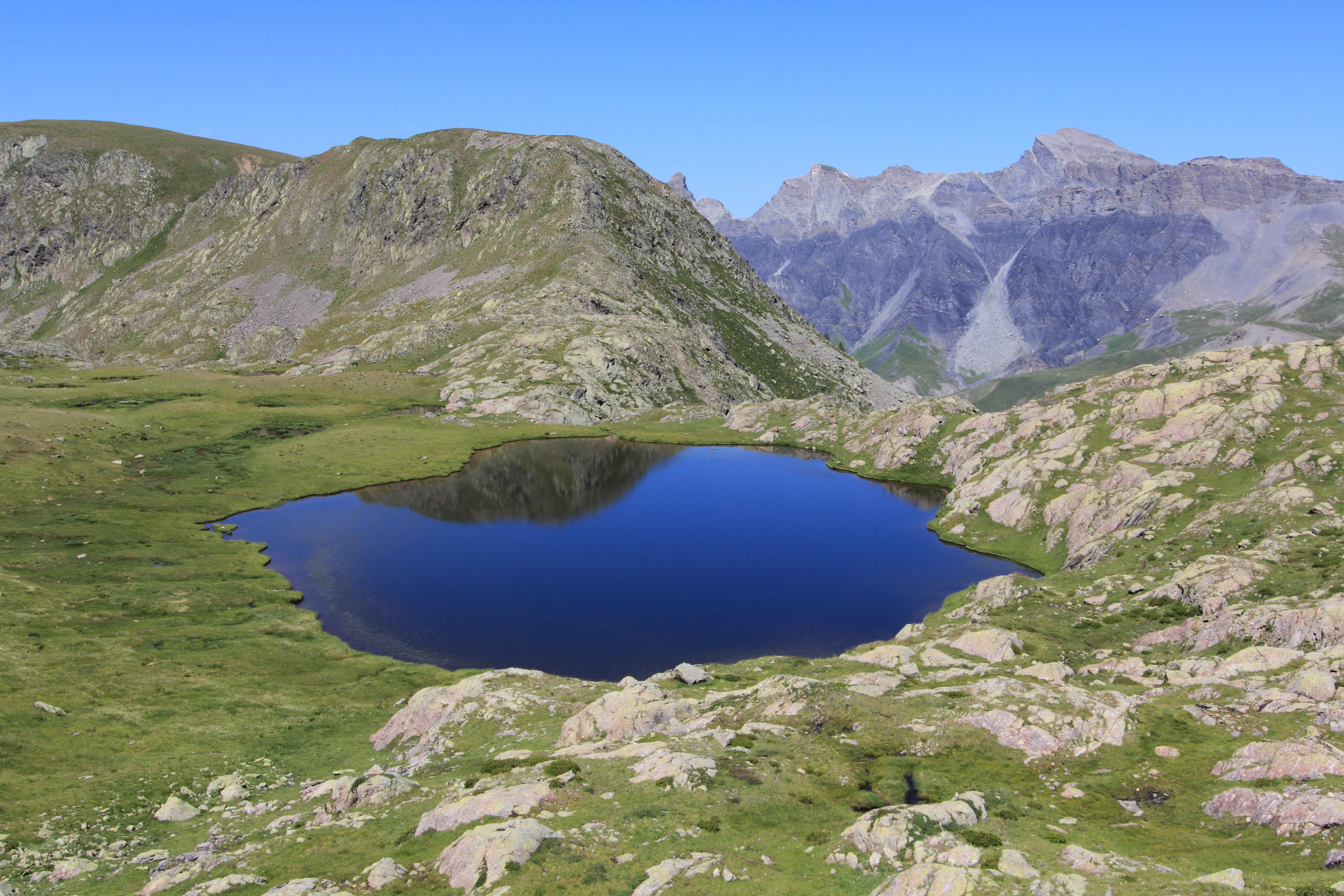
Big Lake of Morgon (2427 m).

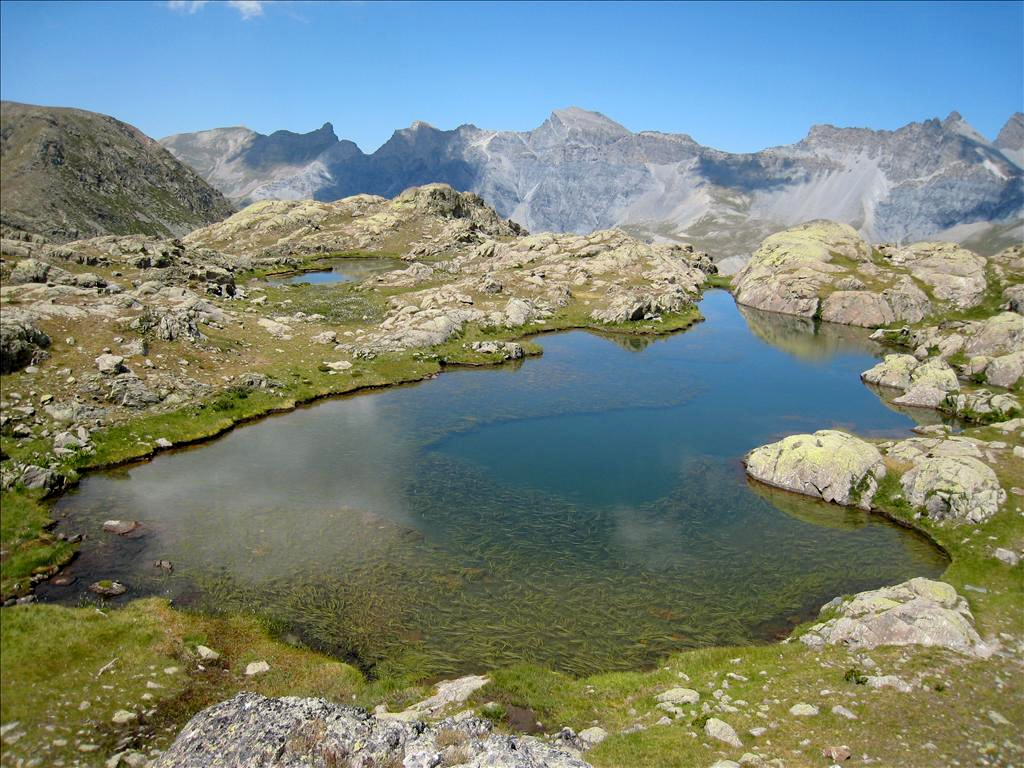
Morgon Median lake (2470 m).

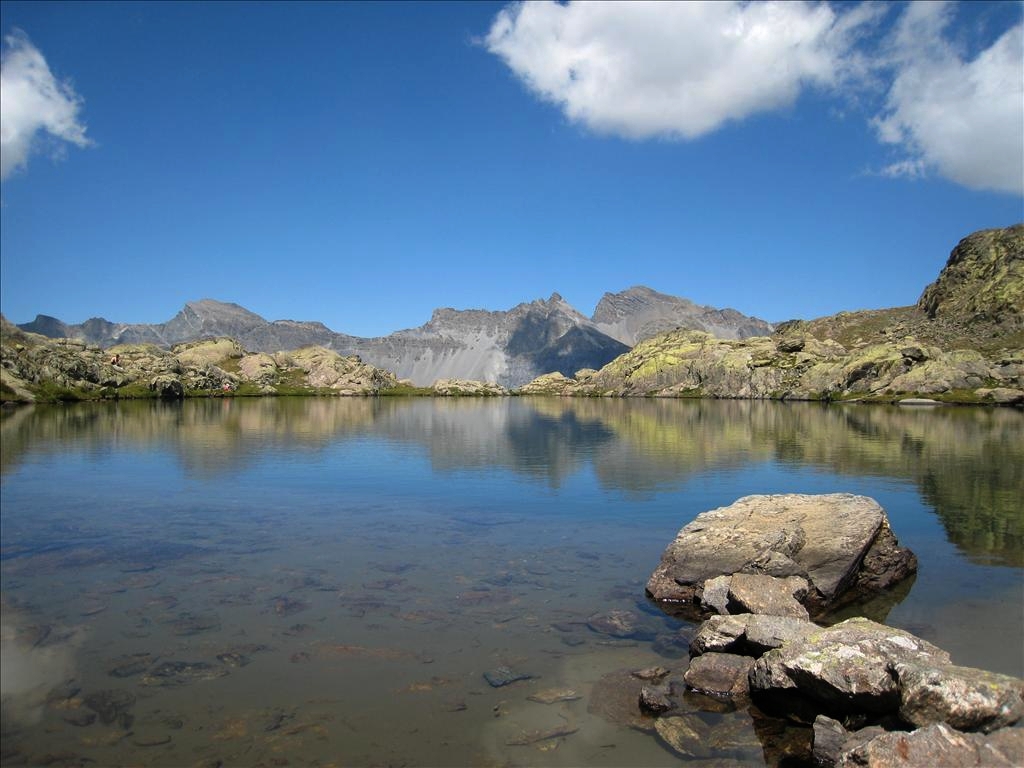
Morgon Higher lake (2480 m).
