= I Wanna Get Better =

Single by Bleachers

from the album Strange Desire
- B-side: "Vince Clarke Remix"
- Released: February 18, 2014
- Recorded: 2013–14
- Genre: Pop rock; new wave; alternative rock
- Length: 3:24
- Label: RCA
- Songwriters: Jack Antonoff; John Hill
- Producers: Jack Antonoff; John Hill

Bleachers singles chronology
"I Wanna Get Better" (2014)	"Shadow" (2014)

Music video
- "I Wanna Get Better" on YouTube

"I Wanna Get Better" is the debut single by American indie pop act Bleachers, released on February 18, 2014, through RCA Records. The song is from their debut studio album Strange Desire, and was written and produced by frontman Jack Antonoff and John Hill. "I Wanna Get Better" topped the Billboard Alternative Songs chart, becoming the band's first number-one single, and also reached the top ten of the Hot Rock Songs chart. Its accompanying music video stars Antonoff as a therapist and was directed by his then girlfriend, actress and filmmaker Lena Dunham.

== Composition ==
"I Wanna Get Better" incorporates cut-up piano notes and samples into its arrangement; Antonoff's vocals range from baritone to "shout-along anthemic."

Antonoff considers the song his "mission statement" because it goes through every bad thing that has happened to him. Antonoff has stated that "the message is heavy, it’s not dumbed down" with the verses being literal and the inspiration coming from a place of sorrow following the events of 9/11, his sister's death in 2002, and his cousin's death during the Iraq War in 2003. In regards to the line "lost control when I panicked at the acid test", Antonoff has stated that he "had a horrible experience" with LSD and it changed his life.

== Music video ==
The official music video for "I Wanna Get Better" premiered on March 27, 2014, and was directed by actress and filmmaker Lena Dunham, frontman Jack Antonoff's then girlfriend. Antonoff described working with Dunham as "fun", adding: "I didn't have to do anything. I felt, obviously, completely supported. It was nice to be in a position where you can’t fuck up."

The video depicts a day in the life of a therapist (Antonoff) who, after getting dumped by his girlfriend (Kimiko Glenn), proceeds to his office and meets a variety of clients, all of whom are depicted describing their own personal problems. Comedian Retta and actor Mike Doyle play a couple who are suffering from marital problems while actor Rizwan Manji plays a highly-strung patient who gets distracted by "Bring Your Daughter To Work" Day. Actress Mary Kay Place plays a patient who is accused of creating "drama" because she thinks her husband is having an affair and the therapist does not believe her, while Shoshana Bush plays a patient who adopted a dog following an abortion. Musician Arrow De Wilde appears in the video as a sullen, disaffected teen. Throughout the video, the cast are filmed lip-synching to the song's lyrics and sometimes even playing instruments as the band members.

== Critical reception ==
"I Wanna Get Better" received critical acclaim, with some reviewers labeling it as one of the best songs of 2014. Michael Tedder of Spin lauded the song, writing that it is "an example of an artist so succinctly summing up their entire raison d’etre in one song that the accompanying album becomes superfluous". Tim Sendra of AllMusic called "I Wanna Get Better" a "flat-out excellent pop song", while Josh Terry of Consequence of Sound felt it was one of the album's best tracks due to its "abounding optimism, complete with a monster, scream-it-at-the-top-of-your-lungs chorus". A staff member for Sputnikmusic described the track as "upbeat, anthemic, sweeping, and memorable". Both Jon Dolan of Rolling Stone and Mat Smith of Clash named "I Wanna Get Better" the highlight track from the album. A more mixed opinion came from Mack Hayden of Under the Radar; he praised "I Wanna Get Better" and fellow Strange Desire track "Rollercoaster" as "great pop rock singles", but commented that "if you can listen to them more than three times without looking for something better, you're a more generous listener than me".

== Personnel ==
Credits sourced from the official Bleachers YouTube channel

- Jack Antonoff – lead and backing vocals, piano, Roland Juno-6, electric guitar, Akai Professional MPC Studio Slimline

== Chart performance ==
Commercially, "I Wanna Get Better" remains the most successful Bleachers single to date. In the United States, it peaked at number one on the Bubbling Under Hot 100 Singles, number ten on the Hot Rock Songs chart, and number five on the Rock Airplay chart. It was later certified platinum by the Recording Industry Association of America, denoting shipments of over 1,000,000 copies. The single also achieved international success, peaking at number fifty-two on the Belgium Ultratip Flanders chart, twenty-one on the Canada Rock chart, eighty-one on the Japan Hot 100, and number forty-nine on the Mexico Ingles Airplay chart.

== Track listing ==
Digital download
No.	Title	Length
1.	"I Wanna Get Better"	3:24
Total length:		3:24

7" vinyl
No.	Title	Length
1.	"I Wanna Get Better"	3:24
2.	"I Wanna Get Better" (Vince Clarke remix)	4:34
Total length:		7:58

== Charts ==
=== Weekly charts ===
Chart (2014)	Peak position
Belgium (Ultratip Bubbling Under Flanders)	52
Canada Rock (Billboard)	21
Japan Hot 100 (Billboard)	81
Mexico Ingles Airplay (Billboard)	49
US Bubbling Under Hot 100 (Billboard)	1
US Alternative Airplay (Billboard)	1
US Hot Rock & Alternative Songs (Billboard)	10
US Rock & Alternative Airplay (Billboard)	6

=== Year-end charts ===
Chart (2014)	Position
US Alternative Songs (Billboard)	12
US Hot Rock Songs (Billboard)	27
US Rock Airplay (Billboard)	18

== Certifications ==
Region	Certification	Certified units/sales
United States (RIAA)	Platinum	1,000,000^{‡}
^{‡} Sales+streaming figures based on certification alone.

== Release history ==
Country	Date	Format	Label	Ref.
Australia	February 18, 2014	Digital download	RCA Records	
United States	February 18, 2014	Digital download	RCA Records	
United States	March 10, 2014	Adult album alternative radio	RCA Records	
United States	March 11, 2014	Modern rock radio	RCA Records	
United States	May 27, 2014	Contemporary hit radio	RCA Records	
United States	June 2, 2014	Hot adult contemporary radio	RCA Records	
United Kingdom	June 18, 2014	Digital download	RCA Records	
