= God morgon =

God morgon may refer to:

- Good morning, a greeting in Swedish
- "God morgon" (Chips song), 1981
- "God morgon" (Uno & Irma song), 2007
