= Like a River Runs =

Single by Bleachers

from the album Strange Desire
- Released: June 23, 2014
- Genre: Power pop; new wave; alternative rock; indie pop
- Length: 3:34
- Label: RCA
- Songwriters: Jack Antonoff; John Hill
- Producers: Jack Antonoff; John Hill

Bleachers singles chronology
"Rollercoaster" (2014)	"Like a River Runs" (2014)	"Entropy" (2015)

Audio video
- "Like a River Runs" on YouTube

"Like a River Runs" is a song by American indie pop act Bleachers, originally appearing on their 2014 album Strange Desire. It was released as a 7-inch disc on June 23, 2014. It was also released to Alternative and Triple A radio on April 27, 2015. In 2015, Bleachers released an EP of the same name, which includes four tracks: a fifteen-minute spoken word track called "Dreams Aren't Random", two alternate versions of the title track performed by the band, and a cover version performed by Sia.

== Track listing ==
1. "Like a River Runs (Jack's 2015 Rework)"
2. "Like a River Runs" (performed by Sia)
3. "Like a River Runs (Live from Buffalo)"
4. "Dreams Aren't Random"

== Charts ==
Chart (2015)	Peak position
US Hot Singles Sales (Billboard)	2
US Rock Digital Songs (Billboard)	40
