= Fun discography =

Band discography

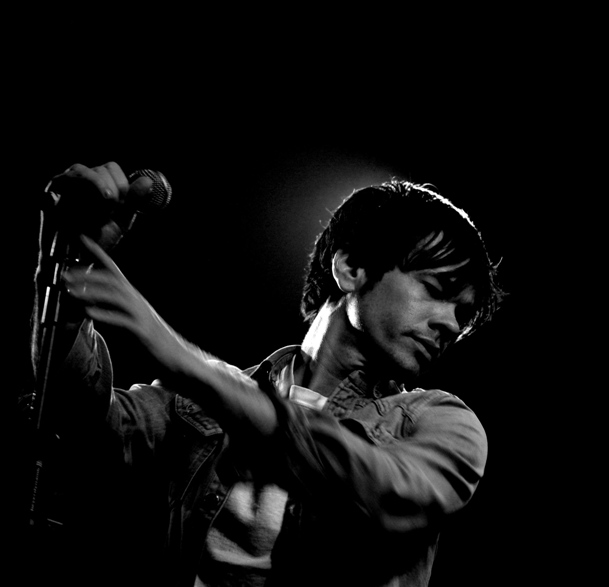
- Lead singer Nate Ruess performing at Electric Ballroom in Camden, London
- Studio albums: 2
- Extended plays: 7
- Singles: 11
- Music videos: 7

The discography of American indie pop band Fun consists of two studio albums, seven extended plays, 11 singles and seven music videos. Following the split of his previous band The Format, lead singer Nate Ruess formed Fun in 2008 with musicians Andrew Dost and Jack Antonoff, both of whom had previously toured with The Format. Fun began recording sessions for their debut album in September 2008 and embarked on a North American tour the following month. In May 2009, they issued their debut single, "At Least I'm Not as Sad (As I Used to Be)". Aim and Ignite, the band's first full-length album, was released by Nettwerk Records on August 25, 2009, and peaked at number 71 on the United States Billboard 200 chart. The album produced an additional two singles, "All the Pretty Girls" and "Walking the Dog", which were then followed by the release of the single "C'mon", a collaboration with American alternative rock band Panic! at the Disco.

The band's single "We Are Young", featuring American R&B singer Janelle Monáe, was released in September 2011, beginning a steady rise in popularity after gaining attention on online media and being covered on the television series Glee. It debuted on the Billboard Hot 100 in December, becoming the band's first single to enter a national record chart. The song's use in a Chevrolet Sonic Super Bowl commercial further increased sales of the song, and it eventually topped the Hot 100 and hit the top ten in multiple other countries, including Canada, Ireland, and the United Kingdom. It has become one of the best-selling singles of all-time, with sales of over 9.3 million copies. The band's second studio album, Some Nights, was released by Fueled by Ramen on February 21, 2012; it debuted at number three on the Billboard 200 and received a platinum certification from the Recording Industry Association of America (RIAA). The album's title track was released as its second single and peaked at number three on the Hot 100, while also reaching the top ten on other national singles charts. "Carry On", "Why Am I the One", and "All Alone" followed as the next three singles from Some Nights.

== Studio albums ==
List of studio albums, with selected chart positions, sales figures and certifications
Title	Album details	Peak chart positions										Sales	Certifications
Title	Album details	US	AUS	AUT	CAN	FRA	IRL	NL	NZ	SWE	UK	Sales	Certifications
Aim and Ignite	Released: August 25, 2009; Label: Nettwerk; Formats: CD, LP, digital download	71	—	—	—	—	—	—	—	—	—	US: 74,000	
Some Nights	Released: February 21, 2012; Label: Fueled by Ramen; Formats: CD, LP, digital download	3	2	11	5	37	8	29	3	36	4	Worldwide: 4,000,000	RIAA: 3× Platinum; ARIA: Platinum; BPI: Platinum; GLF: Gold; IRMA: Platinum; MC: Platinum; RMNZ: 3× Platinum
"—" denotes a recording that did not chart or was not released in that territory.

== Extended plays ==
List of extended plays, with selected chart positions
Title	Details	Peak chart positions			
Title	Details	US	US Alt.	US Rock	UK DL
Fun. Live at Fingerprints	Released: April 12, 2010; Label: Nettwerk; Formats: CD	—	—	—	—
Nova's Red Room Presents Fun.	Released: February 21, 2012; Label: Fueled by Ramen; Format: Digital download	—	—	—	—
The Ghost That You Are to Me	Released: April 21, 2012; Label: Fueled by Ramen; Format: 10"	—	—	—	—
iTunes Session	Released: December 10, 2012; Label: Fueled by Ramen; Format: Digital download	143	16	27	86
Selections & B-Sides from Aim & Ignite	Released: March 7, 2013; Label: Fueled by Ramen; Format: Digital download	—	—	—	—
Before Shane Went to Bangkok: Live in the USA	Released: December 18, 2013; Label: Fueled by Ramen; Format: Digital download, 12"	—	—	—	—
Point and Light	Released: April 19, 2014; Label: Nettwerk; Format: 10"	—	—	—	—
"—" denotes a recording that did not chart or was not released in that territory.

== Singles ==
List of singles, with selected chart positions and certifications, showing year released and album name
Title	Year	Peak chart positions										Certifications	Album
Title	Year	US	AUS	AUT	CAN	ITA	IRL	JPN	MEX	NZ	UK	Certifications	Album
"At Least I'm Not as Sad (As I Used to Be)"	2009	—	—	—	—	—	—	—	—	—	—		Aim and Ignite
"All the Pretty Girls"	2009	—	—	—	—	—	—	—	—	—	—		Aim and Ignite
"Believe in Me"	2010	—	—	—	—	—	—	—	—	—	—		A Winter's Night 2011
"Walking the Dog"	2010	—	—	—	—	—	—	—	—	—	—		Aim and Ignite
"C'mon" (with Panic! at the Disco)	2011	— (Note: "C'mon" did not enter the Billboard Hot 100, but peaked at number 12 on the Hot Singles Sales chart.)	—	—	—	—	—	—	—	—	—		non-album single
"We Are Young" (featuring Janelle Monáe)	2011	1	1	1	1	2	1	5	1	2	1	RIAA: Diamond; ARIA: 7× Platinum; BPI: 4× Platinum; GLF: 4× Platinum; IFPI AUT: Platinum; MC: Diamond; RMNZ: 6× Platinum	Some Nights
"Some Nights"	2012	3	1	6	4	9	6	69	49	1	7	RIAA: 7× Platinum; ARIA: 7× Platinum; BPI: Platinum; GLF: Platinum; IFPI AUT: Gold; MC: 5× Platinum; RMNZ: 4× Platinum	Some Nights
"Carry On"	2012	20	44	—	18	26	46	93	— (Note: "Carry On" did not enter the Mexico Airplay chart, but peaked at number one on the Mexico Ingles Airplay chart.)	28	126	RIAA: 2× Platinum; MC: Platinum; RMNZ: Platinum	Some Nights
"Why Am I the One"	2013	—	57	—	—	—	—	—	—	—	169		Some Nights
"All Alone"	2013	—	—	—	—	—	—	—	—	—	—		Some Nights
"Sight of the Sun"	2014	—	—	—	—	—	—	—	—	—	—		Girls, Vol. 1
"—" denotes a recording that did not chart or was not released in that territory.

== Other charted songs ==
List of songs, with selected chart positions, showing year released and album name
Title	Year	Peak chart positions		Album
Title	Year	US Rock	UK Indie	Album
"Sleigh Ride"	2012	48	13	Holidays Rule
"We Are Young" (iTunes Session) (featuring Janelle Monáe)	2013	— (Note: "We Are Young" (iTunes Session) did not enter the Hot Rock & Alternative Songs chart, but peaked at number 47 on the Rock Digital Song Sales chart.)	—	iTunes Session
"—" denotes a recording that did not chart or was not released in that territory.

== Other appearances ==
- "Please Leave a Light On When You Go" (featured on Song Reader)

== Music videos ==
List of music videos, showing year released and directors
Title	Year	Director(s)
"All the Pretty Girls"	2009	Isaac Rentz
"Walking the Dog"	2010	Skinny
"We Are Young" (featuring Janelle Monáe)	2011	Marc Klasfeld
"Some Nights (Intro)"	2012	Poppy de Villeneuve
"Some Nights"	2012	Anthony Mandler
"Carry On"	2012	Anthony Mandler
"Why Am I the One"	2013	Jordan Bahat
