= List of awards and nominations received by Fun =

These are the awards and nominations received by the American indie rock band, Fun. Fun won four awards from 27 nominations. They were nominated for six Grammys, including Record of the Year ("We Are Young") and Album of the Year (Some Nights), and won Best New Artist and Song of the Year.

== American Music Awards ==
Created by Dick Clark in 1973, the American Music Awards is an annual music awards ceremony and one of several major annual American music awards shows.

Year	Nominee / work	Award	Result
2012	Fun.	New Artist of the Year	Nominated
2012	Fun.	Favorite Pop/Rock Band/Duo/Group	Nominated

== Billboard Music Awards ==
The Billboard Music Awards are an annual awards show from Billboard Magazine.

Year	Nominee / work	Award	Result
2013	Fun.	Hot 100 Artist	Nominated
2013	Fun.	Top Radio Songs Artist	Nominated
2013	Fun.	Top Digital Songs Artist	Nominated
2013	Fun.	Top Duo/Group	Nominated
2013	Fun.	Top Rock Artist	Won
2013	"We Are Young"	Top Streaming Song (Audio)	Nominated
2013	"We Are Young"	Top Streaming Song (Video)	Nominated
2013	"We Are Young"	Top Digital Song	Nominated
2013	"We Are Young"	Top Rock Song	Nominated
2013	"Some Nights"	Top Streaming Song (Audio)	Nominated
2013	"Some Nights"	Top 100 Song	Nominated
2013	"Some Nights"	Top Rock Song	Nominated
2013	Some Nights	Top Rock Album	Nominated

== BRIT Awards ==
The Brit Awards are the British Phonographic Industry's annual pop music awards.

Year	Nominee / work	Award	Result
2013	Fun	Best International Group	Nominated

== Grammy Awards ==
The Grammy Awards are awarded annually by the National Academy of Recording Arts and Sciences of the United States. Fun. earned two Grammys out of six nominations.

Year	Nominee / work	Award	Result
2013	Fun.	Best New Artist	Won
2013	"We Are Young"	Record of the Year	Nominated
2013	"We Are Young"	Song of the Year	Won
2013	"We Are Young"	Best Pop Duo/Group Performance	Nominated
2013	Some Nights	Album of the Year	Nominated
2013	Some Nights	Best Pop Vocal Album	Nominated

== International Dance Music Awards ==
The International Dance Music Awards are an annual awards show honoring dance and electronic artist.

Year	Nominee / work	Award	Result
2013	"Some Nights"	Best Alternative/Indie Rock Dance Track	Nominated

== MTV Video Music Awards ==
The MTV Video Music Awards were established in 1984 by MTV to celebrate the top music videos of the year.

Year	Nominee / work	Award	Result
2012	"We Are Young"	Best New Artist	Nominated
2012	"We Are Young"	Best Pop Video	Nominated
2013	"Carry On"	Best Pop Video	Nominated
2013	"Carry On"	Best Direction	Nominated

== MTV Europe Music Awards ==
The MTV Europe Music Awards (EMA) were established in 1994 by MTV Networks Europe to celebrate the most popular music videos in Europe.

Year	Nominee / work	Award	Result
2012	Fun	Best New Act	Nominated
2012	Fun	Best Push Act	Nominated
2012	"We Are Young"	Best Song	Nominated

== MTV Video Music Awards Japan ==
The MTV Video Music Awards Japan is the Japanese version of the MTV Video Music Awards.

Year	Nominee / work	Award	Result
2013	"We Are Young"	Best Group Video	Nominated
2013	"We Are Young"	Best New Artist	Nominated
2013	"We Are Young"	Best Rock Video	Nominated

== MVPA Awards ==
The Music Video Production Association (MVPA) is a non-profit trade organization created to address the mutual concerns of its members in today's highly competitive, ever-changing music video industry.

Year	Nominee / work	Award	Result
2012	"We Are Young"	Director of the Year	Nominated
2013	"Why Am I the One"	Best Alternative Video	Won

== MuchMusic Video Awards ==
The MuchMusic Video Awards is an annual awards ceremony honoring the best music videos of Canadian artists.

Year	Nominee / work	Award	Result
2013	"Some Nights"	International Video of the Year – Group	Nominated

== Premios 40 Principales ==
The Premios 40 Principales is an annual Spanish awards show that recognises the people and works of pop musicians.

Year	Nominee / work	Award	Result
2012	Fun	Best International New Act	Nominated

== mtvU Woodie Awards ==
Year	Nominee / work	Award	Result
2012	"We Are Young"	Breaking Woodie	Nominated

== NewNowNext Awards ==
Year	Nominee / work	Award	Result
2012	Fun	Brink of Fame Music Artist	Nominated

== Peoples Choice Awards ==
The People's Choice Awards is an awards show recognizing the people and the work of popular culture.

Year	Nominee / work	Award	Result
2013	"We Are Young"	Favorite Song of the Year	Nominated
2013	Some Nights	Favorite Album of the Year	Nominated
2013	Fun	Favorite Breakout Artist	Nominated

== Q Awards ==
Q Awards were established in 1985 and the UK's annual music awards run by the music magazine Q.

Year	Nominee / work	Award	Result
2012	"We Are Young"	Best Track	Nominated

== Teen Choice Awards ==
The Teen Choice Awards were established in 1999 to honor the year's biggest achievements in music, movies, sports and television, being voted by young people aged between 13 and 19.

Year	Nominee / work	Award	Result
2012	Fun	Choice Rock Group	Won
2012	Fun	Choice Breakout Group	Nominated
2012	"We Are Young"	Choice Rock Song	Nominated
2012	"We Are Young"	Choice Single by a Group	Won
2013	Fun	Choice Music Group	Nominated
2013	"Carry On"	Choice Music: Rock Song	Nominated
