= Canopy Glow =

Studio album by Anathallo
- Released: November 18, 2008
- Genres: Baroque pop, folk, experimental
- Length: 44:22
- Label: Anticon

Anathallo chronology
Floating World (2006)	Canopy Glow (2008)

Professional ratings
Aggregate scores
Source	Rating
Metacritic	(70/100)
Review scores
Source	Rating
AbsolutePunk.net	(6.4/10)
Clash	(9/10)
Drowned in Sound	(7/10)
NME	(6/10)
Paste	(9.2/10)
Pitchfork Media	(5.3/10)
PopMatters	6/10 stars
Tiny Mix Tapes	4/5 stars

Canopy Glow is the fourth and final studio album by the American pop band, Anathallo. It was released on November 18, 2008, on CD and re-released on vinyl on May 26, 2009.

== Background ==
After the release of their 2006 album Floating World, the band was offered a residency as the house band in a north Chicago neighborhood church called Berry United Methodist. A few members, worn out from the band's relentless tour schedule, chose not to relocate from Mt. Pleasant, Michigan. The remaining members, including vocalist Matt Joynt and multi-instrumentalist Bret Wallin, recruited replacements and began work on what would become Canopy Glow.

By this point Anathallo had gained a reputation for unique instrumentals, orchestral arrangements, and as many as seven vocalists singing all at once. Having licensed a few songs from Floating World for television commercials, the band was financially secure enough to take a break from touring to write Canopy Glow at their own pace, using the church as their practice space. Female vocalist Erica Froman was brought on as a full-time member of the band at this time.

A lyric from "The River" lends the album its title. Matt Joynt recalls this story of Froman's mother during a hiking trip on the Pacific Crest Trail, saying: "She was crossing a river and the current swept her away. Due to the weight of her pack, she couldn't get to a bank and was certain that she was going to die. Upon that realization, she leaned back, calmed her senses and enjoyed what she thought would be her last living moments... she observed everything with a concentrated mindfulness as she passed underneath the glow of light pouring through the canopy of leaves."

Though beginning with a song about Joynt's grandfather's funeral ("Noni's Field") and featuring this somewhat embellished account of a near-death experience Froman's mother endured, the album has a decidedly positive feel, reportedly influenced by the children seen through the church windows playing at the day care next door.

The song "Bells" was inspired by a chance finding the band members came across while rehearsing in the church during the writing process for Canopy Glow. Matt Joynt said: "After a few weeks, we noticed seven large black cases sitting in the corner. Lo and behold they were filled with hand bells! In our youth, Bret and I had played in the hand bell choir during Christmas services and weren't afraid to employ them on our record."

== Recording ==
The band entered Engine Music Studios in Chicago in the Fall of 2007 to begin tracking Canopy Glow, with "friend-gineer" Neil Strauch directing the process. The band had experienced tension and stress while working on Floating World and were seeking a more relaxed environment to record in. Previous band member Andrew Dost, co-founder of the band fun. was called in as well as other friends and fellow musicians to contribute to the album bringing the total number of musicians to thirteen.

== Cover art ==
The band borrowed a portion of a painting called Temma on Earth by artist Tim Lowly for use as the cover art for the album. The art piece itself is a huge eight foot by twelve foot acrylic gesso with pigment on panel currently on display at the Frye Art Museum in Seattle, Washington.

Tim Lowly is married to pastor Sherrie Lowly from the Chicago church that Anathallo wrote the album in. Temma, the subject of the painting, is the Lowlys' daughter.

== Track listing ==
No.	Title	Length
1.	"Noni's Field"	4:36
2.	"Italo"	3:41
3.	"Northern Lights"	3:49
4.	"The River"	4:43
5.	"Cafetorium"	4:04
6.	"Sleeping Torpor"	5:29
7.	"All the First Pages"	5:17
8.	"John J. Audubon"	3:50
9.	"Bells"	4:44
10.	"Tower of Babel"	4:08
