= Some Nights =

Some Nights may refer to:

- Some Nights (album), by fun., 2012
  - "Some Nights" (song), from the album
- "Some Nights" (Taeyeon song), 2022, from album INVU
