= Floating World (Anathallo album) =

Studio album by Anathallo
- Released: February 25, 2006
- Genre: Indie, folk, experimental
- Label: Artist Friendship

Anathallo chronology
Hymns (2005)	Floating World (2006)	Canopy Glow (2008)

Professional ratings
Review scores
Source	Rating
AbsolutePunk.net	(100%)
Allmusic	3.5/5 stars
Pitchfork Media	(2.7/10)

Floating World, a CD based upon a Japanese Fairy Tale, is the third album by Anathallo. It was self-released in 2006. "Floating World" is the English translation of the Japanese concept of Ukiyo.

== Track listing ==
1. "Ame" – 0:49
2. "Genessaret (Going Out Over 30,000 Fathoms of Water)" – 5:32
3. "Hoodwink" – 5:48
4. "By Number" – 5:08
5. "Dokkoise House (With Face Covered)" – 6:00
6. "Hanasakajijii (Four: A Great Wind, More Ash)" – 4:44
7. "Hanasakajijii (One: The Angry Neighbor)" – 3:10
8. "Inu (Howling)" – 1:20
9. "Hanasakajijii (Two: Floating World)" – 4:57
10. "The Bruised Reed" – 6:04
11. "Yuki! Yuki! Yuki!" – 1:14
12. "Hanasakajijii (Three: The Man Who Made Dead Trees Bloom)" – 4:26
13. "Cuckoo Spitting Blood" – 3:05
14. "Kasa No Hone (The Umbrella's Bones)" – 2:08

== Personnel ==
Recorded at home by Glenn Hills & Anathallo
Drums and electric guitars recorded at Glow in the Dark Studios by Matt Goldman
Mixed at Glow in the Dark Studios by Matt Goldman
Mastered at Rodney Mills Mastering House

Floating World was written and performed by
Daniel Bracken, Andrew Dost, Matthew Joynt, Nathan Sandberg,
Joel Thiele, Seth Walker, and Bret Wallin

Additional musicians
Timbre, Erica Froman, Chris Hatfield, Glenn Hills, Jeremiah Johnson,
Brian Siers, Morgan Stewart, and Israel Vasquez

Design by Greg Leppert for Quiet | letsbequiet.com
