= Anathallo =

American indie rock band

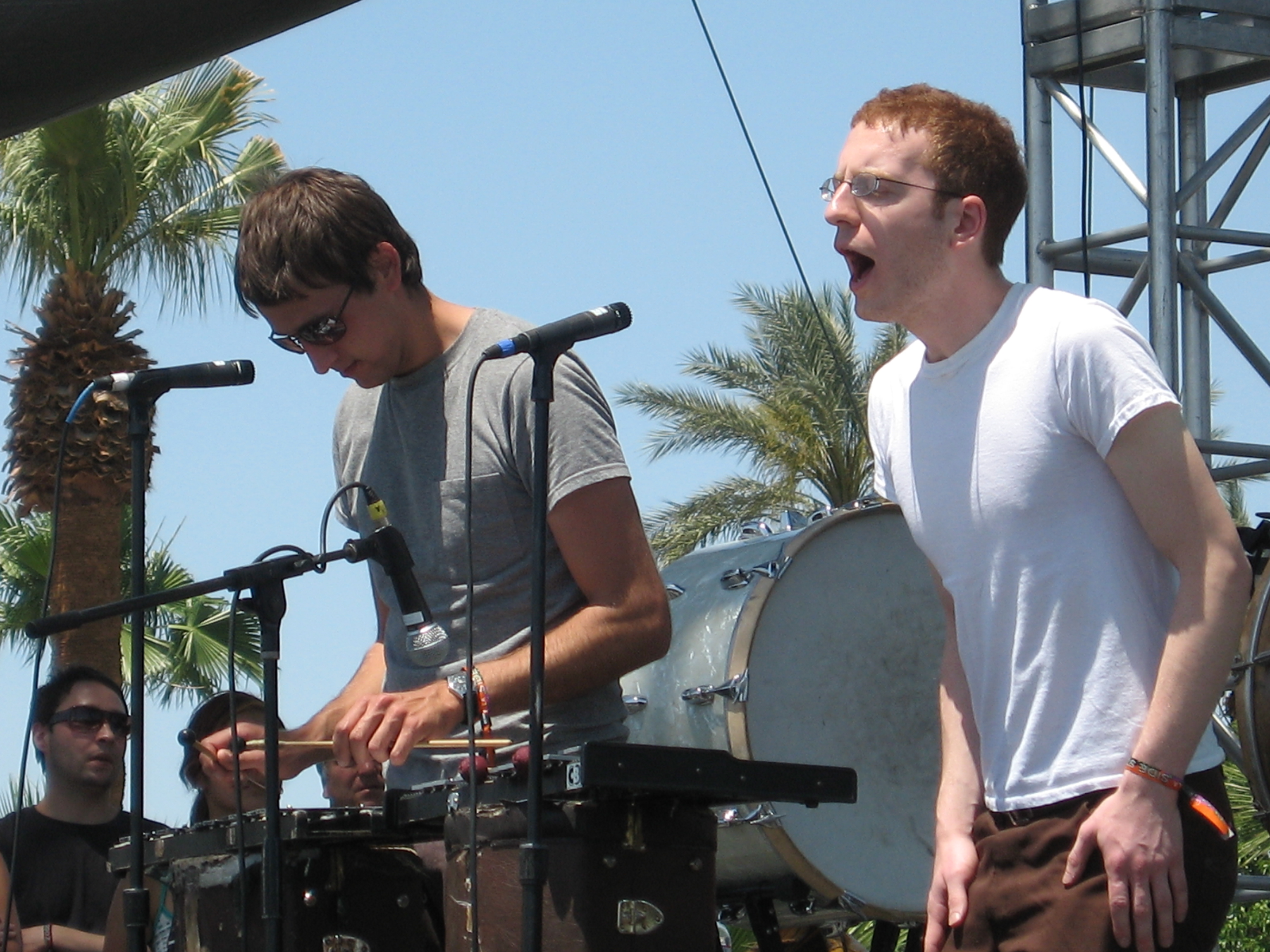
- Andrew Dost and Jamie Macleod performing at Coachella in 2007

Background information
- Origin: Mt. Pleasant, Michigan, United States
- Genre: Indie rock
- Years active: 2000–2009
- Labels: Artist Friendship; Anticon; Moor Works
- Past members: Andrew Dost; Matt Joynt; Bret Wallin; Danny Bracken; Seth Walker; Jeremiah Johnson; Erica Froman; Jamie Macleod; Joel Thiele; Kevin Greenlees (The Jig); Nathan Sandberg; Glenn King; Ty Forquer
- Website: anathallo.com

Anathallo was a band originally from Mt. Pleasant, Michigan and then based in Chicago, Illinois. The band started practicing in the fall of 2000 and played their first show soon afterward. Their name is derived from a Greek word meaning "to renew, refresh or bloom again."

Anathallo released Floating World, their first nationally distributed record, in 2006 through Sony/BMG. The band released a follow-up, entitled Canopy Glow, on Anticon in 2008.

== History ==
Anathallo was formed in Mt. Pleasant, Michigan, in 2000. The band, led by singer and guitarist Matt Joynt, often consisting of seven or eight members, operated in a relentlessly DIY manner for the first six years of its existence, releasing three EPs (one independently, and two on Selah Records) one full-length album (Sparrows originally on Selah Records) and independently booking eighteen national tours between the years 2000 and 2006.

In 2006 the band independently released Floating World, a concept album based on a Japanese story called Hana-Saka-Jiji. Soon after, the album was re-released with wider distribution through Sony/BMG. The album spawned several songs that were used in television commercials, including "Yuki! Yuki! Yuki!" in a Vick's ad, and "Dokkoise House (With Face Covered)" in an American Express commercial. The income from these licenses allowed the band a less stressful experience pursuing their follow-up album. The group relocated to Chicago, Illinois, and accepted an invitation to be artists-in-residence at Berry United Methodist Church where they began working on their follow-up LP, "Canopy Glow".

In 2008, Canopy Glow — which was recorded at Engine Studios by engineer/producer Neil Strauch — was released to critical acclaim in the US, EU, and Japan. Following the release of Canopy Glow, the band toured with an eclectic variety of artists including Sam Amidon, Brand New, Aloha, Page France, The Format, Dosh, Manchester Orchestra and Rainer Maria, played Austin City Limits, Coachella, and Lollapalooza, and shared the stage with Joanna Newsom, Broken Social Scene and Sufjan Stevens. The group toured in support of Canopy Glow with two headlining US tours, one tour of the UK, two European tours and two tours in Japan before going on hiatus in 2009.

On April 12, 2010, after a long silence from the band, member Bret Wallin addressed the inactivity on his personal blog:

Many of you know me from a past life. One which included month-long van rides, small rooms in the back filled with bottled water, playing Tetris with a trailer and seven people's musical equipment, a dry hoodie over a sweat-filled shirt by the end of each night. So let's put it on the record. It's not as though we put a stake through Anathallo's vampire heart. It's more that we wandered the band back to rest, to let it sleep through the day. And whatever or whoever wakes up in its place, we'll see.

== Band members ==
=== Final members ===
- Matt Joynt – vocals, guitar, auxiliary percussion, piano
- Bret Wallin – trombone, auxiliary percussion, vocals
- Danny Bracken – guitar, auxiliary percussion, vocals
- Seth Walker – bass, vocals
- Jeremiah Johnson – drums, percussion, vocals (current live drummer for Wild Nothing)
- Erica Walker – vocals, auxiliary percussion, autoharp
- Jamie Macleod – piano, trumpet, auxiliary percussion, vocals (current law professor at Cardozo School of Law)

=== Former members ===
- Andrew Dost - flugelhorn, piano, vocals, auxiliary percussion ^{c d e} (current member of the band Fun.)
- Greg Leppert – trumpet (current member of the band Foxhole)
- Ken Fedor, auxiliary guitarist (of band Pending Happiness)
- Joel Thiele – drums ^{a b c d e}
- Nathan Sandberg – trombone, auxiliary percussion, piano, vocals ^{a b c d e}
- Kevin Greenlees, The Jig – trombone, auxiliary percussion, vocals ^{c d e}
- Glenn King – guitar, auxiliary percussion, vocals ^{a b c d}
- Ty Forquer – drums, auxiliary percussion, keyboard ^{a b}

(letters denote albums that former members recorded and or wrote: ^{a} Luminous Luminescence in the Atlas Position, ^{b} Sparrows, ^{c} A Holiday at the Sea, ^{d} Hymns EP, ^{e} Floating World)

== Discography ==
=== Albums ===
Year	Title	Record label
2001	Luminous Luminescence in the Atlas Position	Artist Friendship
2002	Sparrows	Selah Records
2006	Floating World	Nettwerk
2008	Canopy Glow	Anticon

=== EPs ===
Year	Title	Record label
2003	A Holiday at the Sea	Artist Friendship
2004	Hymns	Selah Records

=== Other ===
Year	Title	Record label	Notes
2005	Entropy	Potential Getaway Driver	12-inch vinyl split EP with Javelins
2006	Anathallogy	Artist Collective	compilation album
2008	"Hanasakajijii (Four: A Great Wind, More Ash)"	Big Scary Monsters	UK-only 7-inch vinyl single
