= We Are Young =

2011 single by Fun

Single by Fun featuring Janelle Monáe

from the album Some Nights
- B-side: "One Foot"
- Released: September 20, 2011
- Recorded: 2011
- Genre: Arena rock; indie rock; indie pop
- Length: 4:10 (album version); 3:53 (radio edit)
- Label: Fueled by Ramen; Nettwerk; Atlantic
- Songwriters: Jack Antonoff; Jeff Bhasker; Andrew Dost; Nathaniel Ruess
- Producer: Jeff Bhasker

Fun singles chronology
"C'mon" (2011)	"We Are Young" (2011)	"Some Nights" (2012)

Janelle Monáe singles chronology
"Cold War" (2010)	"We Are Young" (2011)	"Q.U.E.E.N." (2013)

Music video
- "We Are Young" on YouTube

"We Are Young" is a song recorded by American pop rock band Fun, featuring American singer Janelle Monáe. It is the third track on the group's second studio album, Some Nights (2012). The song was released on September 20, 2011, as the lead single from the album. The song quickly received widespread acclaim from music critics, with many noting the song as a breakthrough for the indie genre and praising the song's catchiness. "We Are Young" attained commercial success worldwide, reaching number one in several countries.

Initially, the track gained only online media attention, in addition to its first commercial radio airplay on Tampa Bay alt radio station 97X, debuting on September 19, 2011. After this, it was soon covered by the television show Glee. With the Glee version having success on the charts, the song was licensed for use in a Chevrolet Sonic commercial that aired during Super Bowl XLVI. This song alone propelled the band into mainstream success, topping the digital charts in February 2012 and becoming a crossover hit. Peaking at number one on the Billboard Hot 100 through airplay on contemporary hit radio stations, the song topped the charts for six weeks straight. It is also the first song to log seven weeks of 300,000 or more in digital sales, surpassing a record previously held by Eminem and Rihanna's "Love the Way You Lie" (2010).

"We Are Young" has been certified Diamond by the Recording Industry Association of America and is both Fun and Monáe's first charting single on the Hot 100, as well as their first number-one single. The song has also been used in the American Dad! episode "Faking Bad". The song also topped the Hot 100 Airplay chart with 120 million impressions in seven weeks, becoming the first group since Destiny's Child's "Survivor" (2001) to do so. The song was named 99th on the Billboard Hot 100 Songs of All-time.

An accompanying music video was directed by Marc Klasfeld at David Sukonick Concert Hall in Los Angeles. It features the group performing on a stage at a bar where a riot breaks out. As part of the promotion for the song, it was performed at the 2011 Coachella Valley Music and Arts Festival, the American late night television show Conan, and was used as the opening song at the 2012 MTV Movie Awards. The song is featured in the music video game Rock Band Blitz. The song won the Grammy Award for Song of the Year at the 55th Grammy Awards, where it was also nominated for Record of the Year and Best Pop Duo/Group Performance.

== Production ==
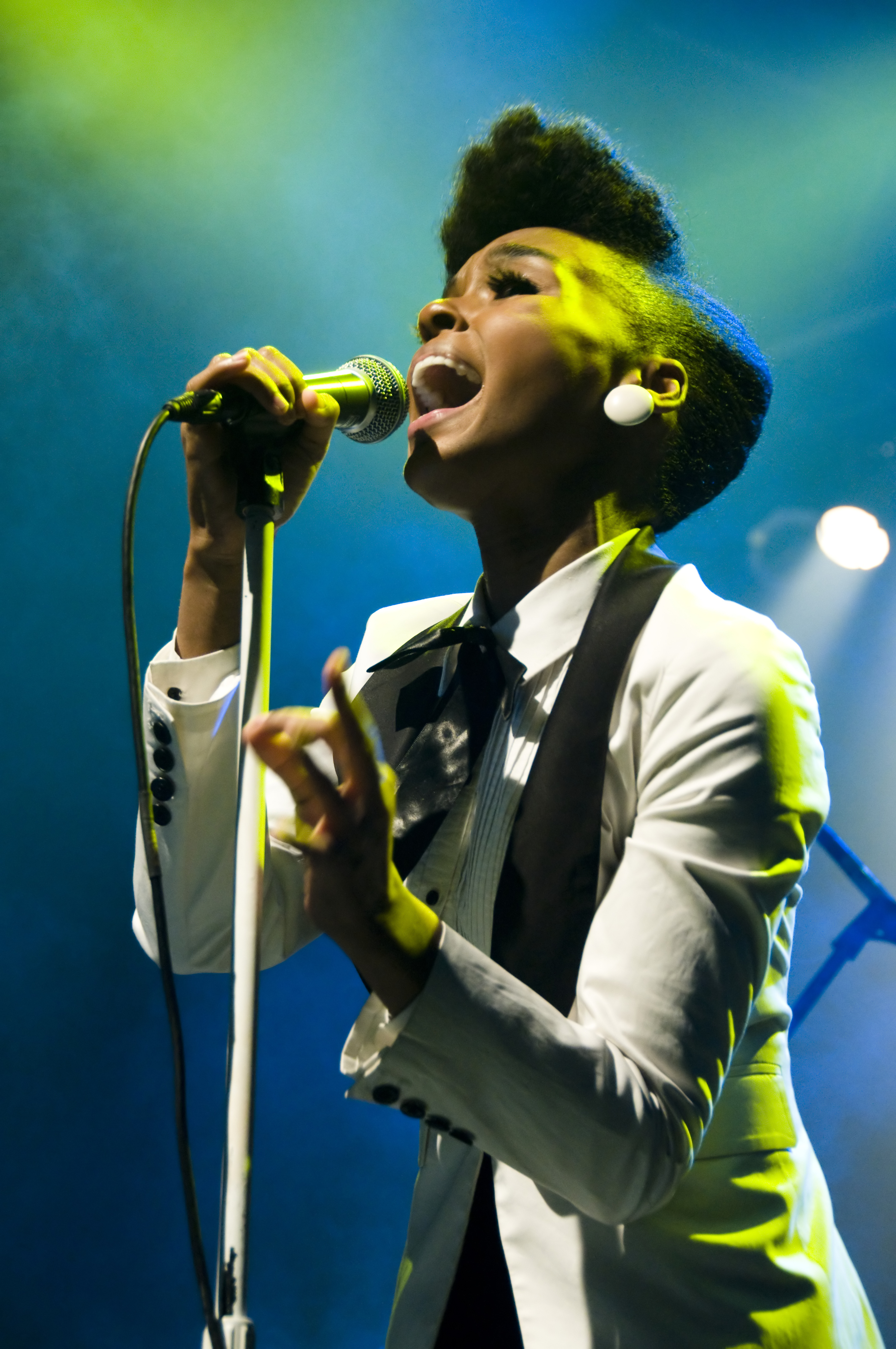
American R&B singer Janelle Monáe, pictured performing in 2009, is featured on "We Are Young".

After the poor commercial performance of their debut album, Aim and Ignite, Fun decided to put Jeff Bhasker as producer for their second studio effort. The band's frontman, Nate Ruess, met with Bhasker at his hotel in New York City in February 2011. Ruess was anxious about meeting Bhasker, so he arrived early at the bar in The Bowery Hotel on the Lower East Side "and had a little to drink just to make sure [he] was loosened up." According to Bhasker, he did not want to meet the band, as he "was working with Beyoncé, and also with Alicia, Kanye and Jay-Z, and doing this had been a big goal in my life. I had no intention of being distracted." Bhasker has stated that the instrumental for the song was "an inch" away from being included on West and Jay-Z's collaborative album Watch the Throne (2011).

Bhasker had just finished a long day in the studio with Beyoncé and had decided to give Ruess 10 minutes. He had previously already canceled two meetings with him. The two began talking about music, and Ruess' desire to merge hip-hop beats and electronic effects with pop rock intrigued Bhasker, who invited Ruess up to his hotel room to show him some Beyoncé tracks he had been working on. "Slightly tipsy and feeling inspired", Ruess belted out the chorus for "We Are Young", which at that time was an unfinished composition. Bhasker was taken aback and automatically "freaked out", demanding he see the band for studio time "in the next few days." The next day, Bhasker and Ruess booked a New York studio and cut a version of "We Are Young" not far from the final version of the track.

On the first day of recording at Jungle City, Bhasker programmed the drums on his Akai MPC3000, a Moog bass, and "maybe using my little Roland Juno-106, and we added vocals and piano. We worked for many more days on it afterwards, but the core of the final version of the song was recorded on that first day." After the Jungle City sessions, more vocal, guitar and piano tracks were recorded at Electric Ladyland Studios. From there, sessions continued at Enormous Studios in Los Angeles, the Village Recorder to track the children's choir, and Abbey Road Studios to record the orchestral arrangements. The band invited Janelle Monáe to provide guest vocals on "We Are Young" through her friendship with Bhasker. After being played the song, Monáe was enthused and recorded her vocals in Bristol, England. Bhasker further mixed the song in a 44.1 kHz/24-bit Pro Tools HD session over almost two weeks, and the stereo mix was mastered using an L2 limiter and an API 550 EQ.

When Bhasker multi-tracked Ruess' vocals for the chorus, he noticed that it "had a Queen/Freddie Mercury vibe to it." Guitarist Jack Antonoff called "We Are Young" the "bull's-eye center" of the sound the band was striving for while producing Some Nights. The song displays the influences brought by Jeff Bhasker and hip-hop music. Antonoff agreed with the notion that the song was their de facto anthem: "It's pretty rare, because any other projects that we've done, I don't think any of us have ever had that song that was like, 'This is our band,'" Antonoff said. "We're proud to say, 'Listen to this one song, and then come listen to the rest. Here it is.'"

== Composition and lyrical interpretation ==
"We Are Young" is a stadium rock, indie rock, and indie pop song. It is written in the key of F major, based almost entirely on the 50s progression (I vi IV V) except for its bridge. It follows a tempo of 116 beats per minute, changing to 92 bpm from the pre-chorus to the end (some bars in the middle changing to 94 bpm). The song has a slow hip hop groove from the first chorus onward. The song is entirely in common time. The instrumentation of the original mix session consists of drums, bass guitar, synth bass, electric guitars, synths, piano, horns and other brass, and a huge number of vocal tracks. As well as the rough mix and two reference tracks by Queen and Kanye West that are muted in the final master.

"We Are Young"
A sample of "We Are Young", displaying the deep-layered drums and vocal harmonies, as well as the grandiose nature of the chorus.

According to Spin, the song incorporates a "marrying fist-pump stadium rock to the prim indie-pop of Grizzly Bear's 'Two Weeks,' keeping the deliberate beats and soaring melodies but replacing choirboy primness with a percussive whomp." Andrew Unterberger of Popdust compared the song's chorus to Pat Benatar's "Love Is a Battlefield" and Supergrass's "Alright". Tim Jonze of The Guardian described the chorus as anthemic and compared it to work done by Arcade Fire and stated that the lyrics were "life-affirming and fit for a teen movie soundtrack."

Lead singer Nate Ruess says the lyrics were inspired by one specific night, after "my worst drinking night of all time." Ruess told Rolling Stone that he was kicked out of a taxi cab for vomiting all over it, saying "the cabbie was demanding all this money, and all I could do was stand on the corner with my head against the wall. It took me another day before I was a functioning adult and could actually write down the verses."

== Critical reception ==
"Obviously the harmonies bring to mind a band like Queen, so there's a touch point for older listeners."

— Bruce Warren, assistant station manager for WXPN (88.5 FM) comparing the song to the work of rock band Queen in an interview with The New York Times.

"We Are Young" received critical acclaim. Jody Rosen of Rolling Stone called the song "rollickingly catchy", writing that "Ruess' knack for the anthemic is matched by Gen-Y humor – emo self-deprecation that leavens the bombast." In addition, fellow Rolling Stone columnist Steve Knopper compared the song's crossover success to that of Foster the People's "Pumped Up Kicks" (2011), writing that the song displays a "sprightly pop-novelty feel" that is the best track on the album. Al Shipley of The Village Voice agreed with this comparison, attributing the song's success to the changing music industry as a result of advertising and iTunes. MTV News called "We Are Young" the band's "breakout anthem" and one of the year's most unlikely sensations.

RJ Cubarrubia of Billboard commended the band for taking their "warm retro sound into soaring ballad territory," calling the track a "bold statement." He did, however, criticize the small inclusion of Janelle Monáe in the track: "Monáe's guest spot is a missed opportunity, as the budding R&B star is relegated to background harmonies instead of adding something soulful and special to an already powerful hook." Bill Lamb of About.com praised the chorus stating: "'We Are Young' carries a hook in the chorus that is likely to stop many listeners dead in their tracks the first time they hear it. The second time around this just might have become your new favorite song." However, Luke Lewis of NME gave a highly negative review of the song, giving a 5 out of 10, stating: "It's not clear what compelled Janelle Monáe to work with these New York-based Panic! at the Disco soundalikes. They're hardly natural bedfellows, and her input is limited to a brief vocal. It's a winning formula though – this stirring emo ballad went to Number One in the US. This year's Owl City then, if that concept doesn't chill your blood."

The song won the Grammy Award for Song of the Year at the 2013 Grammy Awards, where it was also a nominee for Record of the Year and Best Pop Duo/Group Performance.

== Chart performance ==
"We Are Young" hit US radio on December 6, 2011, and entered the Billboard Hot 100 at number 53 on December 24, 2011. The song's debut coincided with the airing of the episode of Glee it was featured in, "Hold On to Sixteen". As such, the Glee version of the song debuted on the same day, and debuted at the number 12 spot on the Billboard Hot 100, meaning the song was technically a Top 40 hit for the Glee cast before the original version. Following the popularity of the Glee version, there was a 1,650% jump in sales of "We Are Young" (from 3,000 to 49,000 during the week of December 11, 2011).

The song had another surge in popularity in February 2012 due to its appearance in a Super Bowl commercial spot, which helped it explode at radio and at retail. In the week following the Super Bowl, it rose 26 spots to number 63 on the Hot 100, and jumped from number 72 to 41 on the Hot Digital Songs chart. It rocketed up the charts, until, on the chart dating March 17, 2012, "We Are Young" ascended to the top position on the Billboard Hot 100. It remained number one for six consecutive weeks, and was also the first song to log seven weeks of 300,000 or more in digital sales, beating a record that was previously held by Eminem's "Love the Way You Lie" (2010). "We Are Young" topped the Hot 100 Airplay chart with 120 million impressions in seven weeks, becoming the first group since Destiny's Child's Survivor (2001). The song was the first song in 2012 to be certified by the RIAA 3 times platinum with sales of 3 million, and was later certified 5 times platinum on June 21, 2012. As of early January 2014, the song had sold 6,830,000 copies in the United States. In 2023, "We Are Young" hit 1 billion Spotify streams.

In the United Kingdom, the song climbed to number one on the UK Singles Chart on May 27, 2012 ― for the week ending date June 2, 2012 ― after floating around the top ten of the chart for several weeks. In November 2012, it made a re-entry to number thirteen. At the time, the song had sold 986,000 copies there, becoming Britain's third biggest-selling single of 2012. Since then, the Official Charts Company have confirmed that "We Are Young" has now sold over one million copies in the United Kingdom, becoming the 128th single to do so in the 60-year history of the UK Singles Chart.

== Music video ==
The music video, directed by Marc Klasfeld, was filmed at David Sukonick Concert Hall in Los Angeles. The video showcases a bar fight in slow motion with the band performing on a stage in the bar. Some other portions of the video were shot in real time. The video opens with a girl (played by Rachel Antonoff, sister of the band's guitarist Jack Antonoff and ex-girlfriend of lead singer Nate Ruess) messaging another person on a HTC Titan. On the screen was a text message reading "NOW!" implying that the message was possibly a signal to begin a flash mob. The girl then throws the smartphone into the middle of the bar, where it hovers in mid-air. As the first chorus begins, the girl gets a wine bottle smashed over her head as the patrons degenerate into a bar fight. Different types of food are thrown and smashed at various points in the video, most notably grapes. Large amounts of flour and confetti are sprayed across the stage from the left and right. People run, fall, and fly across the bar. Streamers and a disco ball also fall from the ceiling. During the second chorus, various glassware is thrown around and, as a result, shatters. A couple kiss with food spread all over their faces, and Janelle Monáe walks into the center of the bar and sings the first half of her bridge in real time and the second in slow motion. Monáe's role in the video was described as being the eye of the storm. It is also implied that Fun's performance mirrors the intensity of the bar's atmosphere, as their performance becomes more intense and energetic as the video progresses. The video concludes with Fun ending their performance as the girl from the beginning of the video walks out of the bar smiling. As of August 2022, the video has received 1 billion views on YouTube.

== Live performances ==
On April 27, 2011, before the song was met with mainstream success, the song was performed at the 2011 Coachella Valley Music and Arts Festival. On February 22, 2012, Fun performed "We Are Young" on Conan backed with a choir. On April 23, 2012, the band performed the song at the iHeartRadio Music Festival among six of their other songs including "Some Nights". The performance was critically successful and garnered positive feedback from Bon Jovi. On June 3, 2012, the band performed the song to open the 2012 MTV Movie Awards. The performance began with the band pounding away in a tiny red-lit cube, dressed in white tuxedos, with frontman Nate Ruess bounding back and forth in the enclosed space. Eventually, as the song grew into the chorus, Ruess stepped out of the cube, and at that widescreen moment, Janelle Monáe herself appeared on the stage, Monáe met Ruess in the middle of the stage, and the two traded verses and embraced. Then, Ruess bounded back to his bandmates and brought the song home. On June 29, 2012, Fun performed "We Are Young" on British talk show The Graham Norton Show and November 11, 2012, on 2012 MTV Europe Music Awards in Frankfurt, Germany. The last performance of "We Are Young" was on December 5, 2012, for "The GRAMMY Nominations Concert Live! – Countdown to Music's Biggest Night" in Nashville, Tennessee, where they were nominated for 6 awards: Album Of The Year (lost), Record Of The Year (lost), Best New Artist (won), Best Pop Vocal Album (lost), Best Pop Duo/Group Performance (lost), and Song Of The Year (won) beating "Call Me Maybe" by Carly Rae Jepsen.

== Influence and legacy ==
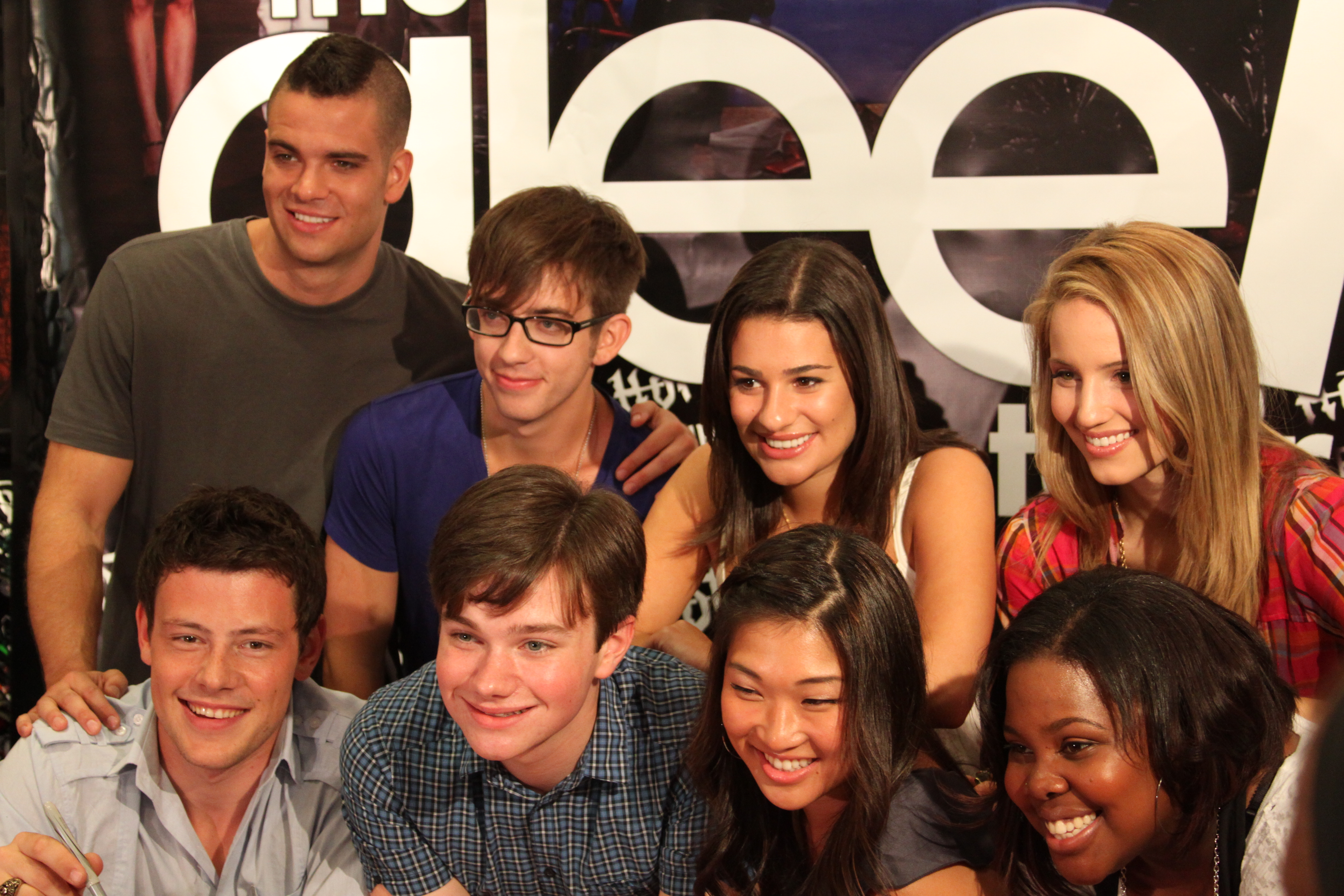
The Glee Cast's cover of "We Are Young" boosted the sales of the song as well as leading to widespread recognition in popular culture.

The song was covered on Glee on the episode "Hold On to Sixteen", which aired in December 2011. The track was given to Glee music supervisors by John Janick, head of Fueled by Ramen, "about five months" before its release, according to Ruess. Janick brought the song to the attention of Glee music supervisor PJ Bloom. "I vividly remember John dropping by my office with a just-mastered 'We Are Young' in hand," said Bloom. "It was still on its original blank CD-R titled in poorly handwritten red Sharpie." When Janick suggested that the track was perfect for the musical show, Bloom demurred. "Glee doesn't break bands, we celebrate existing pop success—that's our core model." Bloom changed his mind after playing the song only once and, less than five minutes later, sent it to Glee co-creator Ryan Murphy. Bloom called the cover of "We Are Young" one of "the pinnacle song moments of the entire series," and continued, "For Fun, Glee provided a launching pad for much of the success to come. For Glee, Fun allowed us to show the world we could be an A&R source and break a band. It was music business perfection." According to Columbia, which handles Glee releases, "We Are Young" marks the first track that was truly broken by Glee. Producers of Glee were incredibly receptive to the track, and set on including it in an episode regardless of whether it became a hit or not. The Glee cast version topped the Digital Songs chart in December 2011, hitting number one on iTunes and number 12 on the Billboard Hot 100. As Glee's version of "We Are Young" gained popularity before the original did, Ruess e-mailed the musical director of the program, writing, "You guys are #1 right now, but we are coming for you, we're going to reclaim the spot!" As of March 2015, the Glee Cast recording has sold 455,000 copies in the United States, making it the seventh best-selling recording in the show's history.

"Obviously you never write the song hoping it ever fits into a commercial of something, you just want to write a good song. I think we'd be more apprehensive if it was something like a cheese commercial."

— Ruess, on the song's licensing for the Chevrolet spot

"We Are Young" was selected as the soundtrack of a one-minute Chevrolet advertisement for the Chevy Sonic, aired during Super Bowl XLVI on February 5, 2012. Chevrolet's agency Goodby, Silverstein & Partners considered "hundreds of songs" before settling on the track. "It's a beautiful song, with a number of different projections in that driving beat and very sweet melody," said Andrew Bancroft, associate creative director for Chevrolet. "He liked the track so much he selected it even before pairing it with the ad's footage, a rarity in music-synching terms," said Billboard. Although most commercials of that kind go through many different competing soundtracks, Chevrolet loved "We Are Young" from an early, rough cut of the spot. The song's appearance in the spot was largely credited for the song's massive commercial success to come. The following year at Super Bowl XLVII, Taco Bell aired its own Super Bowl advertisement with a Spanish version of the song as its soundtrack.

The song was also used in "Faking Bad," an episode of American Dad!. "We Are Young" was also covered by Pentatonix in a May 2012 a cappella version that went viral on YouTube. On the June 6, 2012, episode of Conan, the song was parodied in a "Basic Cable Name That Tune" sketch as their "slightly different" version "We Have Pubes."

The song was used by the WWE as background music to highlight the nominees for Game Changer of the Year at the 2011 WWE Slammy Awards on the December 12 edition of WWE Raw and in the "Once in a Lifetime: The Rock vs. John Cena" special that aired on the USA Network to help promote their highly anticipated match at WrestleMania XXVIII. It was used at the end of Interactive Multimedia's Trash Bash 2012 at MCCTC. "We Are Young" was used in the episode "Chuck versus the Baby" of Chuck's fifth season. It was also featured on both the season finales of Gossip Girl season 5 and 90210 season 4 as the closing number of the episode. It was used as the soundtrack for the trailer of Judd Apatow's film This Is 40.

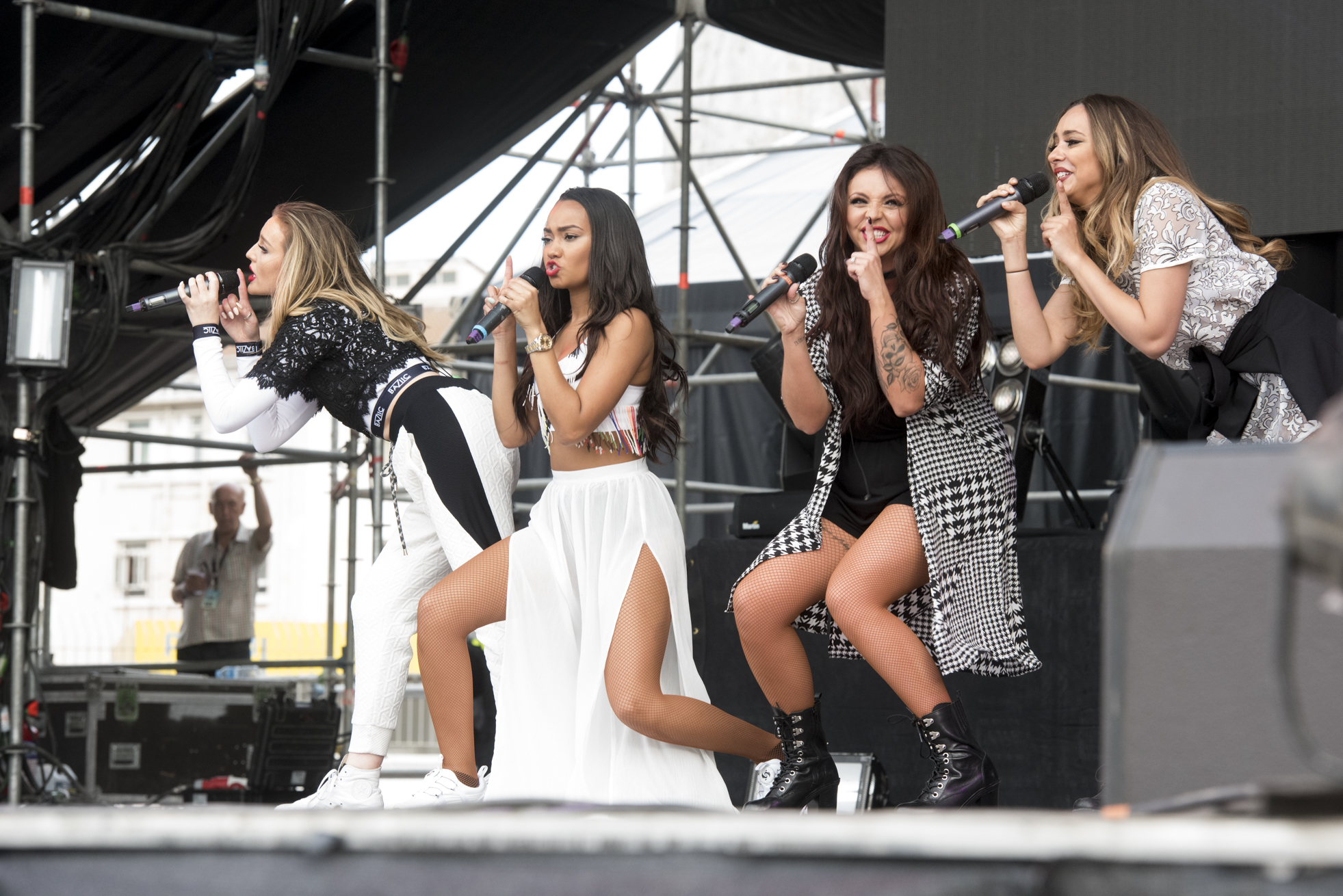
British band Little Mix performed an acoustic version of the song which was included in their debut album.

On August 21, 2012, British girl band and X Factor 2011 winners Little Mix sped up the original version of the song to celebrate their first anniversary as a band, as well as the release of their debut single "Wings". The band's version received mostly positive reviews; Perez Hilton praised the band for their "slowed down, acoustic, choral rendition" of the song and said that it may better than the original version of the song. He also commented that "each girl layers her voice to perfection to create a thick, unparalleled musical icing". Rachel Ho of Starpulse said that the band "show off their powerful vocals as individuals, and harmonizing skills as group". The band's acoustic version was available as a bonus track after pre-ordering the band's debut album DNA (2012). It was also included in the US and Japanese editions of the album, while the acoustic video was available on the DVD of the deluxe edition of the album. The band performed the song again on several other occasions; in December 2012, they performed it during the Capital FM Jingle Bell Ball. In March 2013, the band performed the song during an interview on SiriusXM Hits 1, while in May 2013 the band performed the song, along with acoustic performances of their own songs "Wings" and "How Ya Doin'?", during a session at Capital FM.

The breakout success of "We Are Young" catapulted Fun to levels of success that "no bands today usually receive," according to Billboard. "Since the moment the first note was ever written, there's just been this huge level of excitement," said Ruess. "It's always seemed like we had this big secret, that we couldn't tell anyone, and now, it's just slowly unravelling." John Janick, president/CEO of Fueled by Ramen and co-president of Elektra Records, states that everyone involved felt like "We Are Young" was a special song. "It just felt like a massive record from the beginning," said Janick in March 2012, "not to say that we can foresee the future, but I've noticed in my life there are very few projects where something feels special and you go after things and they come to you and things fall into place. This is one of those projects."

The band's extensive touring, which has included playing Coachella, ensured that the groundwork was already in place for the act to grow, according to Fun's manager, Dalton Sim of Nettwerk Records. "From my perspective, the success comes from the hard work the band, Nettwerk Records and Fueled by Ramen have put into the band for the last three-plus years to develop a real fan base. Now, with some great exposure, the Fun fan base is taking those looks and spreading and connecting the band to new people." In addition, influential Los Angeles-area alternative station KROQ put "We Are Young" in rotation before the Super Bowl appearance based on its anthemic sound and lyrical relatable nature. "That's always the first thing that will get a song on the air, if it's a song we love and we think the listeners will love," said Lisa Worden, music director of KROQ. "That's why it went on the air, and then all the marketing around it is an added bonus. That's helped in getting the song out and reaching a different audience." Al Shipley of The Village Voice called the track "one of 2012's ubiquitous songs," predicting it would fully saturate pop culture in May 2012, when "it inevitably becomes the biggest commencement song since Vitamin C's ghastly 'Graduation (Friends Forever)'."

== Credits and personnel ==
Credits sourced from Sound on Sound

fun.

- Nate Ruess – lead and backing vocals
- Jack Antonoff – electric guitars, bass guitar
- Andrew Dost – piano

Additional musicians

- Janelle Monáe – guest vocals
- Jeff Bhasker – piano, Roland Juno-106 and Moog synthesizers, Akai MPC3000 programming, orchestral and choir arrangement
- Rosie Danvers and TommyD – orchestral arrangement

== Charts ==
=== Weekly charts ===
Weekly chart performance
Chart (2011–2014)	Peak position
Australia (ARIA)	1
Austria (Ö3 Austria Top 40)	1
Belgium (Ultratop 50 Flanders)	5
Belgium (Ultratop 50 Wallonia)	2
Brazil (Billboard Hot 100 Airplay)	52
Canada Hot 100 (Billboard)	1
Canada (Canadian Active Rock)	39
Canada (Canadian Alternative Rock)	3
Czech Republic (IFPI)	2
Denmark (Tracklisten)	3
Europe (Euro Digital Songs)	1
Finland (Suomen virallinen lista)	14
France (SNEP)	7
Germany (GfK)	4
Honduras (Honduras Top 50)	11
Hungary (Rádiós Top 40)	9
Iceland (Tónlist)	1
Ireland (IRMA)	1
Israel (Media Forest)	1
Italy (FIMI)	2
Japan (Japan Hot 100)	5
Luxemburg Digital Songs (Billboard)	6
Mexico Top 20 General (Monitor Latino)	11
Mexico Top 20 Inglés (Monitor Latino)	1
Netherlands (Dutch Top 40)	5
Netherlands (Single Top 100)	10
New Zealand (Recorded Music NZ)	2
Norway (VG-lista)	2
Poland Airplay (ZPAV)	1
Portugal Digital Songs (Billboard)	1
Russia Airplay (TopHit) Slider & Magnit Radio Mix	73
Scottish Singles Sales (Official Charts)	1
Slovakia Airplay (ČNS IFPI)	5
Spain (Promusicae)	12
Sweden (Sverigetopplistan)	4
Switzerland (Schweizer Hitparade)	2
UK Singles (Official Charts)	1
US Billboard Hot 100	1
US Adult Contemporary (Billboard)	12
US Adult Pop Airplay (Billboard)	1
US Dance Club Songs (Billboard)	21
US Hot Rock & Alternative Songs (Billboard)	1
US Pop Airplay (Billboard)	1
US Rhythmic Airplay (Billboard)	16
Venezuela Pop Rock General (Record Report)	3

=== Year-end charts ===
Year-end chart performance
Chart (2012)	Position
Australia (ARIA)	12
Austria (Ö3 Austria Top 40)	8
Belgium (Ultratop 50 Flanders)	19
Belgium (Ultratop 50 Wallonia)	14
Canada (Canadian Hot 100)	3
France (SNEP)	26
Germany (Media Control AG)	25
Hungary (Rádiós Top 40)	55
Iceland (Tónlist)	16
Israel (Media Forest)	2
Italy (FIMI)	14
Japan (Japan Hot 100)	30
Netherlands (Dutch Top 40)	23
Netherlands (Single Top 100)	39
New Zealand (Recorded Music NZ)	3
Poland (ZPAV)	33
Spain (PROMUSICAE)	30
Sweden (Sverigetopplistan)	17
Switzerland (Swiss Hitparade)	15
UK Singles (OCC)	3
US Billboard Hot 100	3
US Pop Songs	7
US Adult Contemporary	24
US Adult Pop Songs	4
US Alternative Songs	5
US Rock Songs	8

Year-end chart performance
Chart (2014)	Position
Russia Airplay (TopHit)	144

=== Decade-end charts ===
2010s-end chart performance for "We Are Young"
Chart (2010–2019)	Position
UK Singles (OCC)	85
US Billboard Hot 100	29

=== All-time charts ===
All-time chart performance
Chart (1958–2018)	Position
US Billboard Hot 100	112

== Certifications ==
Certifications and sales
Region	Certification	Certified units/sales
Australia (ARIA)	7× Platinum	490,000^{‡}
Austria (IFPI Austria)	Platinum	30,000^{*}
Belgium (BRMA)	Gold	15,000^{*}
Canada (Music Canada)	Diamond	800,000^{‡}
Denmark (IFPI Danmark)	Platinum	30,000^{^}
France (SNEP)	Gold	75,000^{*}
Germany (BVMI)	Platinum	300,000^{^}
Italy (FIMI)	2× Platinum	60,000^{*}
Japan (RIAJ)	Gold	100,000^{*}
Mexico (AMPROFON)	2× Platinum+Gold	150,000^{*}
New Zealand (RMNZ)	6× Platinum	180,000^{‡}
Spain (Promusicae)	Platinum	60,000^{‡}
Sweden (GLF)	4× Platinum	160,000^{‡}
Switzerland (IFPI Switzerland)	2× Platinum	60,000^{^}
United Kingdom (BPI)	4× Platinum	2,400,000^{‡}
United States (RIAA)	Diamond	10,000,000^{‡}
Streaming
Denmark (IFPI Danmark)	2× Platinum	3,600,000^{†}
^{*} Sales figures based on certification alone.^{^} Shipments figures based on certification alone.^{‡} Sales+streaming figures based on certification alone.^{†} Streaming-only figures based on certification alone.

== See also ==
- List of best-selling singles in the United States
- List of number-one singles of 2012 (Australia)
- List of Canadian Hot 100 number-one singles of 2012
- List of Billboard Hot 100 number ones of 2012
- List of number-one digital songs of 2012 (U.S.)
- List of UK Singles Chart number ones of the 2010s
- List of number-one singles of 2012 (Poland)
