= Carry On (Fun song) =

2012 single by fun.

Single by Fun

from the album Some Nights
- Released: October 23, 2012
- Recorded: January 2011
- Genre: Indie rock
- Length: 4:38 (Album version); 3:54 (Radio edit)
- Label: Fueled by Ramen, Atlantic, Elektra
- Songwriters: Jeff Bhasker; Nate Ruess; Andrew Dost; Jack Antonoff
- Producer: Jeff Bhasker

Fun singles chronology
"Some Nights" (2012)	"Carry On" (2012)	"Why Am I the One" (2013)

"Carry On" is a song by American pop rock band Fun. It was released on October 23, 2012, as the third single off their second album, Some Nights. The song was written by the band members, Nate Ruess, Andrew Dost, Jack Antonoff, alongside the album's producer, Jeff Bhasker.

== Composition ==
"Carry On" has been called "a song about perseverance in hard times", which is supported by a rock-anthem sound written in F major and composed in 12/8 time. The song begins with Ruess singing with faint vocals, as he confronts a potential suicide. Ruess's quiet vocals are eventually reinforced by a large chorus and band member Jack Antonoff's guitar-playing. The narrator takes refuge in a bar alongside his friends, who begin to contemplate the mortality of the people close to them. Antonoff delivers a short, 20-second "Slash-type wailing" guitar solo, which appears over two and a half minutes into the song.

== Live performances ==
On November 3, 2012, the band was the musical guest on Saturday Night Live, with Louis C.K. as host, and performed this song, alongside "Some Nights". They also performed the song at the 2013 Grammy Awards.

== In media ==
It is also featured in the HGTV 2013 #LoveHome commercial and in the pilot episode of FX series Legit. The song is also featured in the 2013 documentary Bridegroom and the Portuguese telenovela Destinos Cruzados (2013/14). A shortened version is performed in the second season of Zoey's Extraordinary Playlist (2021).

In June 2026, the song was featured in an advertisement for Exdensur.

== Charts ==
"Carry On" was released on October 23, 2012, as the third single off their second album, Some Nights. "Carry On" is their third consecutive single to reach the top 20 on the Billboard Hot 100. It debuted at #100 on that chart and in the subsequent weeks climbed until peaking at #20. It has sold over a million downloads as of April 2013.

=== Weekly charts ===
Chart (2012–2013)	Peak position
Australia (ARIA)	44
Belgium (Ultratip Bubbling Under Flanders)	26
Canada Hot 100 (Billboard)	18
Canada: Alternative Rock (America's Music Charts)	21
Ireland (IRMA)	46
Israel International Airplay (Media Forest)	7
Italy (FIMI)	26
Japan Hot 100 (Billboard)	93
Mexico Ingles Airplay (Billboard)	1
New Zealand (Recorded Music NZ)	28
UK Singles (Official Charts Company)	126
US Billboard Hot 100	20
US Hot Rock & Alternative Songs (Billboard)	2
US Adult Alternative Airplay (Billboard)	3
US Adult Contemporary (Billboard)	14
US Adult Pop Airplay (Billboard)	4
US Alternative Airplay (Billboard)	7
US Pop Airplay (Billboard)	17
US Rock & Alternative Airplay (Billboard)	5

=== Year-end charts ===
Chart (2013)	Position
Canada (Canadian Hot 100)	69
Italy (FIMI)	98
US Billboard Hot 100	76
US Hot Rock Songs (Billboard)	14
US Adult Alternative Songs (Billboard)	11
US Adult Top 40 (Billboard)	16
US Alternative Songs (Billboard)	22
US Rock Airplay (Billboard)	15

== Certifications ==
Region	Certification	Certified units/sales
Canada (Music Canada)	Platinum	80,000^{*}
Italy (FIMI)	Gold	15,000^{*}
New Zealand (RMNZ)	Platinum	15,000^{*}
United States (RIAA)	2× Platinum	2,000,000^{‡}
^{*} Sales figures based on certification alone.^{‡} Sales+streaming figures based on certification alone.
