= Aim and Ignite =

Studio album by Fun
- Released: August 25, 2009
- Genres: Pop; baroque pop; indie pop
- Length: 42:20
- Label: Nettwerk
- Producer: Steven McDonald

Fun chronology
Aim and Ignite (2009)	Some Nights (2012)

Singles from Aim and Ignite
- 1. "At Least I'm Not as Sad (As I Used to Be)" Released: May 5, 2009; 2. "All the Pretty Girls" Released: November 4, 2009; 3. "Walking the Dog" Released: August 16, 2010

Aim and Ignite is the debut studio album by American indie pop band Fun. It was recorded at Appletree Studios.

== Background ==
On February 4, 2008, The Format broke up. Soon after, vocalist Nate Ruess had called up Jack Antonoff, from the band Steel Train and Andrew Dost of Anathallo. They created the band Fun. and headed into the studio with producer Steven Shane McDonald.

== Composition ==
The album was described as "what a pop album should sound like" and "the most essential pop album of 2009" by AbsolutePunk. AllMusic compared the trio to Queen and the Electric Light Orchestra. It was said "it used previous Format tricks like using bright horns and sophisticated harmonies".

== Release ==
On April 20, 2009, it was revealed that fans could download "At Least I'm Not as Sad (As I Used to Be)" for free upon signing up with the band's mailing list. In addition, it was mentioned that the band's debut album would be released in August. Between late April and early June, the band supported Manchester Orchestra on their headlining tour of the US. On May 19, Aim and Ignite was announced for release in August. In addition, the album's track listing was revealed. In August, the band went on a tour of the US with Hellogoodbye, Limbeck and My Favorite Highway. Aim and Ignite was released on August 25 through Nettwerk. Two of the bonus tracks are re-imagined versions of songs on the CD, and two are remixes. The title of the album comes from a line of the lyrics on the track "Light a Roman Candle with Me". Following a support slot for Motion City Soundtrack, Fun supported Paramore on their headlining US tour in April and May.

== Reception ==
Professional ratings
Review scores
Source	Rating
AbsolutePunk.net	89%
AllMusic	3.5/5 stars
The Aquarian Weekly	B+
Melodic	4/5 stars
Music Emissions	5/5 stars
PopMatters	5/10
Redefine	A−
Rock Sound	8/10
Sputnikmusic	3.5/5 stars

Aim and Ignite was released to positive reviews. AbsolutePunk.net's Drew Beringer praised the album, calling it "what a pop album should sound like" and "the most essential pop album of 2009". AllMusic called the album "progressive, but in the best possible way" and admired Ruess's lyrics for "investigating the larger truths of life...with a witty approach that keeps the songs bubbling merrily along on a positive note". Dave de Sylvia of Sputnikmusic wrote, "Aim and Ignite isn’t the most consistent pop album around," but he ultimately commended the album as "a superbly mixed and arranged album made by musicians who clearly understand the limits and potential of pop music".

Estella Hung of PopMatters was less impressed with the album, praising songs "Be Calm" and "The Gambler", but criticizing the lyrics and production of the album's early tracks. Hung concluded that while Aim and Ignite is "pretty original to say the least", it "fails to live up to the Format's last outing". Popdose's Ken Shane called the album "an interesting and unusual listen". Shane applauded the album's songwriting and said "many of the songs are really good", but he objected to the "cute" production, desiring to hear the band "in a more stripped-down form. He ended his review with: "I have a similar problem with Dr. Dog, a band that was recommended to me by a number of people. I think much of their recorded work is too fussed over, but when I saw them live and their sound was more stripped down out of necessity, emphasizing their powerful songwriting, I thought they were wonderful. Perhaps the same fate awaits me with Fun."

The album reached number 26 on Sputnikmusic's top 50 albums of 2009.

== Track listing ==
All tracks are written by Nate Ruess, Andrew Dost, and Jack Antonoff, except where noted otherwise.

Standard edition
No.	Title	Length
1.	"Be Calm"	4:10
2.	"Benson Hedges"	4:00
3.	"All the Pretty Girls"	3:23
4.	"I Wanna Be the One"	3:37
5.	"At Least I'm Not as Sad (As I Used to Be)"	4:07
6.	"Light a Roman Candle With Me"	3:05
7.	"Walking the Dog"	3:41
8.	"Barlights"	4:18
9.	"The Gambler"	4:12
10.	"Take Your Time (Coming Home)"	7:52
Total length:		42:20

iTunes bonus tracks
No.	Title	Writer(s)	Length
11.	"Stitch Me Up"	Ruess; Dost; Antonoff	4:05
12.	"Walking the Dog II"		4:31
13.	"Take Your Time (Coming Home)" (Acoustic)		3:57
14.	"Walking the Dog" (RAC Mix)		4:30
15.	"All the Pretty Girls" (RAC Mix)		4:25
Total length:			64:00

== Personnel ==
=== fun. ===
- Nate Ruess – lead and backing vocals
- Jack Antonoff – lead guitar, drums, percussion, backing vocals
- Andrew Dost – piano, guitars, theremin, percussion, keyboards, flugelhorn, trumpet, synthesizers, glockenspiel, backing vocals

=== Additional musicians ===
- Jas Thor – trombone (tracks: 4, 6, 8)
- Double G – saxophones (tracks: 5, 8)
- Lara Wickes – oboe (track 4)
- Phil Parlapiano – accordion (track 1)
- Mike Whits – viola (tracks: 5, 6, 9)
- Ina Whits – violin (tracks: 5, 6, 9)
- Timothy Loo – cello (tracks: 5, 6, 9)
- Vanessa Freebairn-Smith – cello (tracks: 1, 2, 4, 6)
- Neel Hammond – violin and viola (tracks: 1–6, 9)
- John O'Reilly – drums (all tracks except: 7, 9)
- Steven Shane McDonald – vocals (tracks: 4, 10), bass (all tracks except: 2, 9)
- Roger Joseph Manning Jr.. – calliope (track 1)
- Christopher Bautista – trumpet (tracks: 1, 8)
- Connie Corn – vocals (tracks: 2, 8, 10)
- Karen Mills – vocals (tracks: 2, 8, 10)
- Ida Relhm – vocals (tracks: 2, 8, 10)
- Anna Waronker – vocals (tracks: 1, 5)
- Rachel Antonoff – vocals (tracks: 1, 4, 5)

== Charts ==
Chart performance for Aim and Ignite
Chart (2009)	Peak position
US Billboard 200	71
US Alternative Albums (Billboard)	20
US Rock Albums (Billboard)	23
US Tastemaker Albums (Billboard)	3
