= Some Nights (song) =

2012 single by Fun

Single by Fun

from the album Some Nights
- Released: June 4, 2012
- Recorded: 2011
- Genre: Alternative rock
- Length: 4:36 (album version); 4:00 (radio edit) [promo only]
- Label: Fueled by Ramen; Atlantic
- Songwriters: Jeff Bhasker; Nate Ruess; Andrew Dost; Jack Antonoff
- Producer: Jeff Bhasker

Fun singles chronology
"We Are Young" (2011)	"Some Nights" (2012)	"Carry On" (2012)

Music video
- "Some Nights" on YouTube

"Some Nights" is a song by American pop rock band Fun. It was released on June 4, 2012, as the second single from their second album Some Nights. The song was written by Jeff Bhasker, Nate Ruess, Andrew Dost, and Jack Antonoff. Musically, "Some Nights" is an alternative rock song with elements of power pop and progressive pop while the lyrics depict the protagonist having an existential crisis.

In the United States, "Some Nights" was a sleeper hit, spending approximately seven months on the Billboard Hot 100 before reaching a peak of number 3 for six non-consecutive weeks beginning at the end of September 2012. The song became Fun's second single to enter the chart's Top 10, as well as their second song to be certified Platinum in the U.S., after their previous single, "We Are Young". "Some Nights" was successful around the world, topping the singles charts of Australia, Israel and New Zealand, and it reached the Top 10 in an additional nine countries, including the United Kingdom and Canada.

== Composition and lyrical interpretation ==
"Some Nights" is written in the key of C major at a tempo of 108 beats per minute. A line in their lyrics, "this is it, boys; this is war", recalls "99 Red Balloons", the English version of Nena's 1983 hit "99 Luftballons". Lyrically, the song expresses the existential angst of a young protagonist who is a long way from home. Lead singer Nate Ruess explained to Mesfin Fekadu of the Associated Press: "I'm always thinking about, 'Who am I and why did I do something like that?' And I think then it harkens back to my family, and I have such a strong tie to them and it's always therapeutic to sing about them." Ruess came up with the song and album title while on tour in Scotland; he wrote the song based on the title. Lyrically, the song is about "just being someone different on any given night."

There has been some confusion with the fans as the lyric "Some terrible nights" was mistaken for "...lies". Members of Fun. confirmed on November 18, 2012, on their Twitter and Facebook accounts that "it's NIGHTS not LIES." Jeff Giles, writing for Diffuser, compared the song to Simon and Garfunkel's "Cecilia". Ruess commented that Simon's Graceland (1986) was an influence on the song in an interview with Billboard.

== Critical reception ==
The Re-View calls "Some Nights" a "bolder, catchier and more striking track than its predecessor "We Are Young", upping the stakes when it comes to both style and substance." In closing, he cited the track as one that would "cement [Fun] as one of the most intriguing and exciting new bands to emerge from the States in recent years." The Guardian writer Dave Simpson compared Ruess's vocals in the song to those of Freddie Mercury and called the lyrics "sincere and oddly moving".

Ray Rahman of Entertainment Weekly, while reviewing the whole album, criticized its second half as inferior to the first and also called "Some Nights" the best track on the album, alongside "We Are Young".

Rolling Stone named the song the 11th best song of 2012.

== Chart performance ==
"Some Nights" has reached number 1 in Australia, New Zealand, and Israel. The song has also reached the top ten in the United States, Canada, Ireland, Austria, Italy, Belgium, and the United Kingdom, and has so far made the top 30 in the Netherlands, Sweden, and Switzerland; it has also charted in Japan.

In the United States, "Some Nights" debuted on the Billboard Hot 100 the same week their album Some Nights debuted at number 3 on the Billboard 200. The song remained in the lower region of the chart for approximately four months due to low-level sales and consistent high-level streaming, before finally entering the top 40 in its 18th week. In its 23rd week, it switched places with "We Are Young" at number 11 on the chart, where it stayed the week after. In the song's 25th week on the chart, it entered the top ten by jumping to number 8. In its sixth week in the top 10, the song reached number 3, which has been its peak position. As of March 2014, the song has sold over 5 million copies in the United States. It also reached number 2 on the Mainstream Top 40 chart, coincidentally behind Maroon 5's "One More Night".

== Music video ==
The music video for "Some Nights" was produced by Poonam Sehrawat and directed by Anthony Mandler, and released on MTV.com on June 4, 2012. The video is of a fictional American Civil War night battle where the band performs on the battlefield. The lead singer, Nate Ruess, also sings as he rallies a Union regiment in preparation for battle. The flag of the Union troops is that of the 20th Maine Infantry Regiment, volunteer soldiers that were commanded by Joshua Lawrence Chamberlain starting in 1863. The video features two soldiers, one from each side of the conflict. The Confederate soldier is a middle-aged farmer clearly in love with his life, land and animals. The Union soldier is a young man, presumably from Maine, who has left his love to fight as a volunteer. In battle, the two sides first form lines and engage in a shooting battle. The Confederates charge the Union line (though they do so without appearing to mount bayonets). The Union troops engage in hand-to-hand combat in which the young Union soldier grits his teeth with determination and bayonets the Confederate soldier-farmer, brutally killing him. The Union regiment is victorious and the band follows the Union troops as it marches confidently and with apparent conviction towards its next battle, the young soldier exemplifying fulfilment in answering the song's central question, "What do I stand for?". He writes his love a letter which she cherishes.

== Credits and personnel ==
- Lead vocals – Nate Ruess
- Piano, bass guitar, keyboards, background vocals – Andrew Dost
- Guitar, drums, background vocals – Jack Antonoff
- Keyboards, programming, background vocals – Jeff Bhasker
- Additional programming – Pat Reynolds
- Additional guest vocals – Joi Starr
- Producers – Jeff Bhasker
- Lyrics – Jeff Bhasker, Nate Ruess, Andrew Dost, Jack Antonoff
- Label: Fueled by Ramen

== In popular culture ==
"Some Nights" appeared in the series finale of Harry's Law, and has been used in television spots for the ABC program Secret Millionaire. The song was also used in promos for the 2012 MTV Movie Awards and the 2013 BCS National Championship Game. Fun performed the song on The Colbert Report, Late Night with Jimmy Fallon, Sunrise, The Jonathan Ross Show, and Saturday Night Live. It also was used in trailers and advertisements promoting the Disney animated film Wreck-It Ralph.

The Chicago Blackhawks use the song as a backing track in several promotional montages.

Southwest Airlines used the song in the first TV spot for their "Welcome Aboard" ad campaign, which was also their first campaign by TBWA/Chiat/Day.

On Air With Ryan Seacrest reviews a collaborative video version of Some Nights performed by nine "YouTube stars". Produced by Jake Coco and W. G. Snuffy Walden, vocalists include Jake Coco, Corey Gray, Caitlin Hart, Madilyn Bailey, Savannah Outen, Jess Moskaluke, Sara Niemietz, Eppic, and Black Prez. Released on Jake Coco's YouTube channel on August 11, 2012, by October 13, 2012, this cover version received 4,532,233 views in 63 days. In August 2012, "Some Nights" was covered by Canadian band Walk Off The Earth for their YouTube channel. Ohio based metalcore band Like Moths To Flames covered the song on the compilation album Punk Goes Pop 5.

Ellie Goulding has covered the song as well in late 2012 on BBC Radio in the "Live Lounge".

The song was covered by the New Directions glee club in the "Dynamic Duets" episode of Glee.

On April 25, 2013, teen actress and musician Victoria Justice (of Nickelodeon's Victorious) posted a softer acoustic rendition of "Some Nights".

A cappella group Straight No Chaser released a mashup of this song and "We Are Young" for their 2013 album Under the Influence.

The song was covered The Band Perry in concert from Jackson, Michigan We Are Pioneers World Tour 2013 with mashup "Night Gone Wasted".

== Charts ==
=== Weekly charts ===
Weekly chart performance for "Some Nights"
Chart (2012–2013)	Peak position
Australia (ARIA)	1
Austria (Ö3 Austria Top 40)	6
Belgium (Ultratop 50 Flanders)	42
Belgium (Ultratop 50 Wallonia)	37
Canada Hot 100 (Billboard)	4
Canada CHR/Top 40 (Billboard)	7
Canada Hot AC (Billboard)	2
Canada Rock (Billboard)	18
Czech Republic Airplay (ČNS IFPI)	6
Denmark (Tracklisten)	12
Euro Digital Song Sales (Billboard)	8
Finland (Suomen virallinen lista)	11
France (SNEP)	37
Germany (GfK)	25
Honduras (Honduras Top 50)	32
Hungary (Editors' Choice Top 40)	24
Ireland (IRMA)	6
Israel International Airplay (Media Forest)	1
Italy (FIMI)	9
Japan Hot 100 (Billboard)	69
Netherlands (Dutch Top 40)	9
Netherlands (Single Top 100)	14
New Zealand (Recorded Music NZ)	1
Norway (VG-lista)	17
Scottish Singles Sales (Official Charts)	5
Slovakia Airplay (ČNS IFPI)	98
Sweden (Sverigetopplistan)	8
Switzerland (Schweizer Hitparade)	15
UK Singles (Official Charts)	7
US Billboard Hot 100	3
US Adult Contemporary (Billboard)	5
US Adult Pop Airplay (Billboard)	1
US Hot Rock & Alternative Songs (Billboard)	1
US Pop Airplay (Billboard)	2
US Rhythmic Airplay (Billboard)	40
US Rock & Alternative Airplay (Billboard)	3
Venezuela (Record Report)	91

=== Year-end charts ===
2012 year-end chart performance for "Some Nights"
Chart (2012)	Position
Australia (ARIA)	15
Austria (Ö3 Austria Top 40)	53
Canada (Canadian Hot 100)	27
Israel (Media Forest)	5
Italy (FIMI)	40
Netherlands (Dutch Top 40)	37
Netherlands (Single Top 100)	60
New Zealand (Recorded Music NZ)	9
Sweden (Sverigetopplistan)	35
Switzerland (Schweizer Hitparade)	75
UK Singles (Official Charts Company)	77
US Billboard Hot 100	14
US Adult Top 40 (Billboard)	17
US Mainstream Top 40 (Billboard)	30
US Hot Rock Songs (Billboard)	13

2013 year-end chart performance for "Some Nights"
Chart (2013)	Position
Canada (Canadian Hot 100)	53
France (SNEP)	184
US Billboard Hot 100	58
US Adult Contemporary (Billboard)	15
US Adult Top 40 (Billboard)	34
US Hot Rock Songs (Billboard)	11

=== Decade-end charts ===
2010s-end chart performance for "Some Nights"
Chart (2010–2019)	Position
US Billboard Hot 100	67
US Hot Rock Songs (Billboard)	28

=== All-time charts ===
All-time chart performance for "Some Nights"
Chart (1958–2018)	Position
US Billboard Hot 100	396

== Certifications ==
Certifications and sales for "Some Nights"
Region	Certification	Certified units/sales
Australia (ARIA)	7× Platinum	490,000^{‡}
Austria (IFPI Austria)	Gold	15,000^{*}
Canada (Music Canada)	5× Platinum	400,000^{*}
Denmark (IFPI Danmark)	Gold	15,000^{^}
Germany (BVMI)	Gold	150,000^{‡}
Italy (FIMI)	Platinum	30,000^{*}
Mexico (AMPROFON)	Gold	30,000^{*}
New Zealand (RMNZ)	4× Platinum	120,000^{‡}
Spain (Promusicae)	Gold	30,000^{‡}
Sweden (GLF)	Platinum	40,000^{‡}
Switzerland (IFPI Switzerland)	Platinum	30,000^{^}
United Kingdom (BPI)	Platinum	600,000^{‡}
United States (RIAA)	7× Platinum	7,000,000^{‡}
Streaming
Denmark (IFPI Danmark)	2× Platinum	3,600,000^{†}
^{*} Sales figures based on certification alone.^{^} Shipments figures based on certification alone.^{‡} Sales+streaming figures based on certification alone.^{†} Streaming-only figures based on certification alone.
