= Some Nights (album) =

2012 studio album by Fun

Studio album by Fun
- Released: February 21, 2012
- Recorded: 2011
- Genres: Pop rock; indie pop
- Length: 43:05
- Label: Fueled by Ramen
- Producers: Jeff Bhasker; Emile Haynie; Jake One; TommyD

Fun chronology
Aim and Ignite (2009)	Some Nights (2012)	Before Shane Went to Bangkok: Live in the USA (2013)

Singles from Some Nights
- 1. "We Are Young" Released: September 20, 2011; 2. "Some Nights" Released: June 4, 2012; 3. "Carry On" Released: October 23, 2012; 4. "Why Am I the One" Released: February 27, 2013; 5. "All Alone" Released: May 19, 2013

Some Nights is the second and final studio album by the American pop rock group fun. It was released on February 21, 2012, through Fueled by Ramen. It was recorded in 2011 and produced by Jeff Bhasker. After signing to the new label, the band began to work on Some Nights for over nine months throughout 2011.

"We Are Young" was released as the lead single from the album and bolstered the band to mainstream success with the aid of television and advertising. It topped the US Billboard Hot 100 for six weeks and Alternative Songs for two weeks, with over six million digital downloads. The title track was commissioned as the second single and has reached No. 3 on the Billboard Hot 100 chart, selling 6.8 million digital downloads as well as becoming their second No. 1 on Alternative Songs. The band later won the Grammy Award for Best New Artist, and "We Are Young" won the Grammy Award for Song of the Year. Fun received four other Grammy nominations: two for "We Are Young" and two for the album itself.

== Background ==
Fun signed to Fueled by Ramen in late 2010. Lead vocalist Nate Ruess, who had apprehensions about joining a major label in the past, recalled the switch being "very, very easy" for the group, stating that both parties approached it as if they "knew what [they] were getting into with each other." The transition was in the works with the label for almost nine months, when the head of the label reached out to the band. Ruess was flattered that employed workers for the label would buy their own tickets to Fun shows and "talk about us with the passion you'd generally reserve for an artist you're working with." After lengthy discussions within the band, the band decided to give the label a try.

Ruess recalls that he was listening to "so much hip-hop" during the production that it became a big influence for him, specifically Kanye West's My Beautiful Dark Twisted Fantasy. The band felt inspired and gradually began working on new songs, each carrying an obvious hip-hop influence. Consciously, the band began working in the hip-hop factor and realized they wanted a hip-hop producer. After scanning the liner notes of his other hip-hop records, Ruess noticed that Jeff Bhasker was one of the most common names. Bhasker was preoccupied at the time working with Beyoncé but Ruess was persistent in meeting with him.

== Recording and production ==
The most common creative process in the recording of Some Nights began with Ruess. Ruess would come in with lyrics and a melody, leading Andrew Dost and guitarist Jack Antonoff to build chord structure and instrumentation from there, or "support that melody". Dost noted that in recording, despite the composer's well-defined framework, the individuals' egos "pretty much disappear" and "everybody is happy to work towards the best possible song" cohesively together. The dynamic between Bhasker and the band in the studio was mutually inspired, as Bhasker had never worked with a rock band before and Fun had never worked with a hip-hop producer. Bhasker particularly enjoyed recording guitars with guitarist Jack Antonoff as he was not used to it, and Dost felt hearing Bhasker compose beats was "mind-blowing".

The emphasis for Ruess on Some Nights was to make the songs more cohesive, as he felt his writing was "all over the place". This meant creating songs that were concise instead of being "long and drawn out". Bhasker was a proponent of using a single instrument to provide the biggest sounds, desiring not to "over-cram [the] songs with ideas", declaring that everything that makes the song must be well-chosen. Janelle Monáe collaborated with the trio on "We Are Young" through a friendship with Bhasker. Bhasker was credited with bringing the band a bigger sound and an entirely new sonic translation to the band not present on their debut, Aim and Ignite.

The album creates a mix of indie pop, theatric rock, and hip-hop—a sound that is credited to Bhasker. Some Nights as a title floated around before any songs for the album were even created and was envisioned by Ruess. It was inspired by how personalities can change on any given night. Ruess has attributed the phrasing "some nights" to a viral audio recording of newscasters bickering off the air. Although the album is not a concept album, the title changed the band's ideas for the album considerably, with Dost stating, "It's really nice once you have a title to know what the parameters are of what you're working on as a whole." The band completed production on the album in October 2011. Ruess called the seven months spent recording the record the most rewarding of any in his ten years of professional music work, calling it his career highlight.

== Composition ==
The album and the band's music has received several comparisons to Queen. Rolling Stone's Jody Rosen, called the album a mix of "close harmony chorales, showy key changes, a dash of Queen here, a dollop of Les Miz there". In an interview with Fuse, producer Jeff Bhasker also stated that the album's lead single "We Are Young" "had a Queen/Freddie Mercury vibe to it". Marcus Glimer of The A.V. Club wrote that the album featured "more synthetic elements [keyboards and drum machines]" than their debut album Aim and Ignite, and compared the beat to "All Alone" to a hip-hop track. NPR columnist Daoud Tyler-Ameen commented that the album might be the start of a new phase of music, in which musicians would infuse the "sounds and rhythms once associated with hip-hop" with their pop music.

The album's lyrics have been called "plaintive", for dealing with themes of loneliness, self-worth, introspection, paranoia and existentialism, contrasting with the album's "anthemic" music. Tyler-Ameen considered the album "remarkable for its sheer optimism", despite the sad and mournful lyrics, Rosen wrote that "Ruess' knack for the anthemic is matched by Gen-Y humor – emo self-deprecation that leavens the bombast". while Marcus Gilmer praised Ruess' "prose-style lyrics", similar to his work in his previous band, The Format. Ruess later commented on the importance of lyrics to him, saying that he took "great pride" after he finished writing them. He also considered most lyrics written by current musicians to be "dumbed down", partially causing "rock music's current woes".

== Promotion ==
"We Are Young"
"We Are Young" was the lead single from the album and became very popular, skyrocketing up the charts after media inclusion in advertisements and television shows. It can be credited with bringing the band to mainstream popularity.

The album's lead single, "We Are Young", was highly successful, and bolstered the band into mainstream popularity in early 2012. The song caught attention through the Fox television series Glee covering it. The band was in shock at the news, with Dost saying that "that's just one of the coolest things that could possibly have happened." Glee's cover of "We Are Young" was the show's highest selling debut single of their season and connected their listening audience to the band. Even after being benefited by the high-profile cover, "We Are Young" became the soundtrack to a Chevrolet spot that aired during Super Bowl XLVI, which brought Fun to a type of exposure that Billboard noted "few current bands receive." The Chevrolet advertisement was credited by the Los Angeles Times for the song's chart success on iTunes: it went to number one on the Hot Digital Songs chart a week before the album's release. The song was performed on the MTV Movie Awards on June 4, 2012, alongside Janelle Monáe.

As a thank-you to their fans for their support of the band, Fun streamed Some Nights in advance on their official website a week before the album's release. On November 3, 2012, the band performed "Some Nights" and "Carry On" on Saturday Night Live, to promote the release of both singles.

"All Alone" was performed on Alan Carr: Chatty Man on April 19, and was released as the fifth and final single from the album on May 13, 2013, in the United Kingdom.

== Critical reception ==
Professional ratings
Aggregate scores
Source	Rating
AnyDecentMusic?	5.4/10
Metacritic	60/100
Review scores
Source	Rating
AllMusic	4/5 stars
Alternative Press	3.5/5 stars
Entertainment Weekly	B−
The Guardian	4/5 stars
The Independent	2/5 stars
Now	4/5
PopMatters	4/10
Q	2/5 stars
Rolling Stone	3.5/5 stars
Spin	7/10

Some Nights received generally mixed reviews from music critics. At Metacritic, which assigns a rating out of 100 to reviews from mainstream critics, the album received an average score of 60, based on 21 reviews, which indicates "mixed or average reviews". Rolling Stone's Jody Rosen complimented the album's "classic bubble-pop tunefulness with rococo rock & roll". Sputnikmusic staff reviewer Adam Knott wrote, "The energy and personality which flood out of every melody give this album its own stamp of authority. It tips over into excess at rare moments, but even as you can hear those moments happening, they provoke grins inside and out." Ray Rahman of Entertainment Weekly was less positive, criticizing the album's second half as being inferior to the first. Morgan Troper of PopMatters wrote that "in a bizarre, inverted way, Some Nights is Nate Ruess coming into his own as a singer and songwriter," but was critical of Ruess' use of pop music conventions in the album's songs.

The album was listed at number 43 on Rolling Stone's list of the top 50 albums of 2012, saying "Ruess' emo sweetness and self-doubting humor make Some Nights a castle you could feel at home in."

== Commercial performance ==
The album debuted at number three on the Billboard 200 with first-week sales of 70,000 copies in the United States. The album has been certified triple platinum by the Recording Industry Association of America (RIAA); as of February 2015, it has sold over 1.6 million copies.

In the UK, it sold 310,000 copies in 2012.

The album's lead single "We Are Young", became the first multi-member band debut to top the Billboard Hot 100 since Nickelback's "How You Remind Me" in December 2001. It also earned a footnote in chart history by becoming the first, and only, tune that has ever gained more than 300,000 downloads a week for seven weeks straight, topping three million downloads in all.

== Track listing ==
All tracks are written by Andrew Dost, Jack Antonoff, Jeff Bhasker and Nate Ruess, except where noted otherwise.

Standard edition
No.	Title	Writer(s)	Length
1.	"Some Nights (Intro)"		2:19
2.	"Some Nights"		4:36
3.	"We Are Young" (featuring Janelle Monáe)		4:10
4.	"Carry On"		4:38
5.	"It Gets Better"		3:36
6.	"Why Am I the One"		4:46
7.	"All Alone"		3:03
8.	"All Alright"	Dost; Emile Haynie; Antonoff; Jake One; Bhasker; Ruess	3:57
9.	"One Foot"		3:31
10.	"Stars"		6:52
Total length:			41:28

Bonus track
No.	Title	Writer(s)	Length
11.	"Out on the Town"	Dost; Haynie; Antonoff; Bhasker; Ruess	4:21
Total length:			45:49

Deluxe edition
No.	Title	Length
12.	"We Are Young" (featuring Janelle Monáe) (Acoustic)	4:32
13.	"Carry On" (Acoustic)	4:08
14.	"Why Am I the One?" (Acoustic)	4:22
15.	"We Are Young" (featuring Janelle Monáe) (Alvin Risk Remix)	4:09
Total length:		59:00

== Personnel ==
Fun

- Jack Antonoff – guitar
- Andrew Dost – horns, vocals
- Nate Ruess – lead vocals, background vocals

Additional musicians

- Janelle Monáe – vocals on (track 3)
- Jeff Bhasker – drum programming (track 3), keyboards (track 3, 8), background vocals (track 3, 9), bass, additional piano (track 8), synthesizers (track 9)
- Emile Haynie – drum programming (track 7, 9), keyboards (track 8, 9)

== Charts ==
=== Weekly charts ===
Weekly chart performance for Some Nights
Chart (2012–2013)	Peak position
Australian Albums (ARIA)	2
Austrian Albums (Ö3 Austria)	11
Belgian Albums (Ultratop Flanders)	32
Belgian Albums (Ultratop Wallonia)	52
Canadian Albums (Billboard)	5
Danish Albums (Hitlisten)	22
Dutch Albums (Album Top 100)	29
Finnish Albums (Suomen virallinen lista)	50
French Albums (SNEP)	37
German Albums (Offizielle Top 100)	30
Irish Albums (IRMA)	8
Italian Albums (FIMI)	25
Japanese Albums (Oricon)	12
Mexican Albums (AMPROFON)	87
New Zealand Albums (RMNZ)	3
Norwegian Albums (VG-lista)	4
Portuguese Albums (AFP)	27
Scottish Albums (Official Charts)	3
South African Albums (RSG)	5
Spanish Albums (Promusicae)	69
Swedish Albums (Sverigetopplistan)	36
Swiss Albums (Schweizer Hitparade)	16
UK Albums (Official Charts)	4
US Billboard 200	3
US Top Alternative Albums (Billboard)	1
US Top Rock Albums (Billboard)	1

=== Year-end charts ===
2012 year-end chart performance for Some Nights
Chart (2012)	Position
Australian Albums (ARIA)	28
Canadian Albums (Billboard)	31
Dutch Albums (Album Top 100)	95
French Albums (SNEP)	142
Italian Albums (FIMI)	100
UK Albums (OCC)	23
US Billboard 200	20
US Top Rock Albums (Billboard)	5

2013 year-end chart performance for Some Nights
Chart (2013)	Position
Australian Albums (ARIA)	77
New Zealand Albums (RMNZ)	22
UK Albums (OCC)	78
US Billboard 200	23
US Top Rock Albums (Billboard)	5

=== Decade-end charts ===
Decade-end chart performance for Some Nights
Chart (2010–2019)	Position
US Billboard 200	63

== Certifications and sales ==
Certifications and sales figures for Some Nights
Region	Certification	Certified units/sales
Australia (ARIA)	Platinum	70,000^{^}
Canada (Music Canada)	Platinum	80,000^{^}
Denmark (IFPI Danmark)	Gold	10,000^{‡}
France (SNEP)	Gold	50,000^{*}
Ireland (IRMA)	Platinum	15,000^{^}
Italy (FIMI)	Gold	25,000^{‡}
Japan (RIAJ)	Gold	100,000^{^}
New Zealand (RMNZ)	3× Platinum	45,000^{‡}
Sweden (GLF)	Gold	20,000^{‡}
United Kingdom (BPI)	Platinum	310,000
United States (RIAA)	3× Platinum	3,000,000^{‡}
Summaries
Worldwide (2012)	—	1,800,000
^{*} Sales figures based on certification alone.^{^} Shipments figures based on certification alone.^{‡} Sales+streaming figures based on certification alone.
