= Andrew Dost =

American songwriter (born 1983)

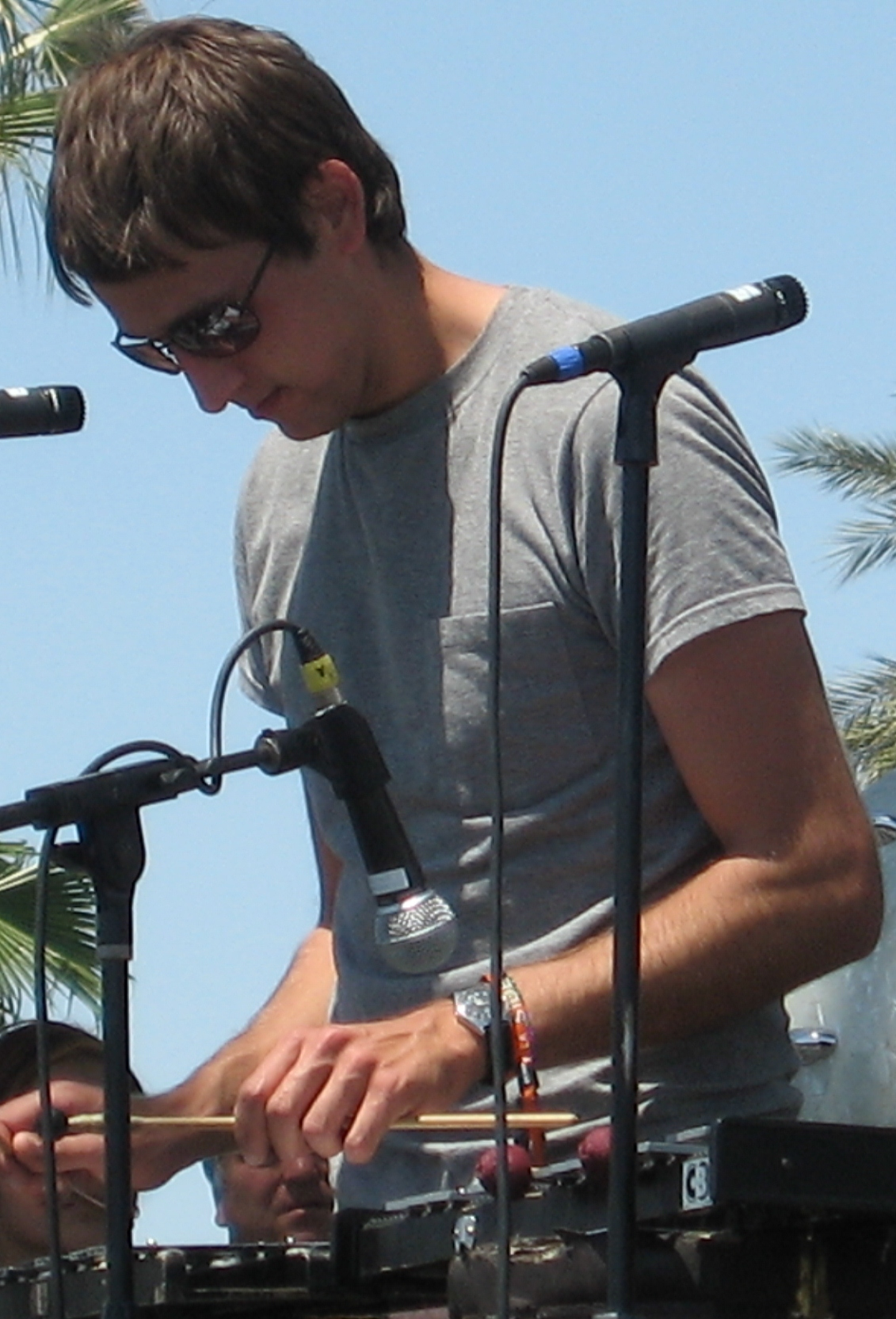
- Dost performing with Anathallo at Coachella in 2007.

Background information
- Born: Andrew Paul Dost; April 10, 1983 (age 43); Cass City, Michigan, U.S.
- Genres: Indie pop; alternative rock; indie rock; baroque pop
- Occupations: Musician; singer
- Instruments: Piano; keyboards; glockenspiel; guitar; bass; drums; flugelhorn; theremin; trumpet; vocals
- Years active: 2000–present
- Label: Fueled by Ramen
- Formerly of: Anathallo; fun.

Andrew Paul Dost (born April 10, 1983) is an American musician and singer; he is a member of the indie bossa nova/jazz band Metal Bubble Trio, in which he is the lead singer. He was formerly a member of the indie rock band Anathallo from 2003 to 2007, as well as the indie rock band Fun. from 2008 to 2015.

== Early and personal life ==
Andrew Dost was born to father Mark Dost, a retired teacher at Frankfort High School, and mother Cheryl, also a retired teacher at Frankfort High School.

Dost grew up in Cass City, Michigan and Frankfort, Michigan. He graduated from Frankfort High School in Michigan as valedictorian in 2001, and graduated from Central Michigan University with a degree in journalism in 2005.

Regarding Dost's musical ambitions, his father, Mark, has said, "We always encouraged it because he plays flugelhorn, keyboard, guitar, melodica and drums. And he can sing. I am so pleased and proud that he's able to do what he loves to do and make a living at it. You wonder how is this going to work out as far as making a car payment. Yet as a parent you want your child to be fulfilled."

Dost is also a fairly active LGBTQ+ ally, and a founding member of The Ally Coalition, an organization "that works with entertainers and their fans to raise awareness, action, and funds in support of LGBTQ equality . . ."

== Career ==
=== Anathallo ===
Dost began his musical career as a member of the band Anathallo, which was formed in 2000 at Central Michigan University in Mount Pleasant, Michigan, with Dost joining in 2003. He left the band halfway through writing album Canopy Glow in 2006; he has said that he left because the band had relocated to Chicago and he was not able to move with.

=== Columbus ===
After leaving Anathallo, Dost began work on a solo album, Columbus. It was based on a musical he had written in 2005 about the life of Christopher Columbus. According to an editorial review, "The story is a comedy of sorts, taking preposterous liberties with the legendary tale of Christopher Columbus . . . Columbus takes a quirky story and creates a heartfelt world for it."

The album was written, produced, and recorded almost entirely by Dost, along with help from Michael Nau (of Page France and The Cotton Jones Basket Ride), Nate Ruess (of The Format), Joel Thiele (of Anathallo), Chris Fafalios, and Steve Soboslai. The album was released in 2009 on vinyl and digital.

=== Fun. ===
In 2008, Nate Ruess (former frontman of The Format) asked Dost to join him and Jack Antonoff (of Steel Train) in a new band, which became Fun. Dost already knew the two, because their former bands had toured together.

While making Fun.'s first album, Aim and Ignite, Dost remained based out of Michigan, while Ruess lived in Phoenix, Arizona, and Antonoff in New Jersey.

Fun.'s second album, Some Nights, saw the band's first #1 hit single, "We Are Young", which Dost co-wrote with Ruess, Antonoff, and Jeff Bhasker, the band's producer.

Dost also created an original score for the beginning of the "Carry On" music video in 2012.

=== Scores ===
He composed the soundtrack to the movie The D Train, released in 2015. The soundtrack contains a collaboration with his Fun. bandmate Jack Antonoff.

=== Solo career ===
In late 2015, Dost has mentioned that he hopes to release new music soon.

On April 20, 2016, Dost said in an interview with the Metro Times that he's, "finishing an album, and scoring some films and TV shows in the meantime. It's been fun to have some time to experiment with music in a lot of different ways."

In this same interview, Dost also said, regarding his music, "I'm pretty heavily influenced by '60s pop, but also love experimenting with modern sounds. I like the Beatles, I like musical theater, and I like Drake."

On April 29, 2016, Dost performed a new song titled "Where Did They Go" along with an unreleased song titled "Young Republicans" at the Detroit Music Awards. These songs have not been released officially as singles.

Dost also composed music for dogs in 2014. Since Fun. went on hiatus, Dost has been involved in films, podcasts, TV shows, and NFTs.

In 2021, Dost returned to Michigan with the intent to work on his music and other art locally. He began teaching in the singer-songwriter program at Interlochen Center for the Arts around this time.

== Songwriting credits ==
| Year | Artist | Song | Co-written with | U.S. peak position | U.K. peak position |
|---|---|---|---|---|---|
| 2011 | Fun. | "We Are Young" | Nate Ruess, Jack Antonoff, Jeff Bhasker | 1 | 1 |
| 2012 | Fun. | "Some Nights" | Nate Ruess, Jack Antonoff, Jeff Bhasker | 3 | 7 |

== Discography ==
=== Albums ===
- Floating World (2006) with Anathallo
- Columbus (2009) (based on a play he wrote in 2005)

=== Soundtracks ===
- The D Train (2015)

=== Singles ===
==== as featured artist ====
- "Mean What I Say" (2015) by That Dog
