= Fun (band) =

American pop rock band

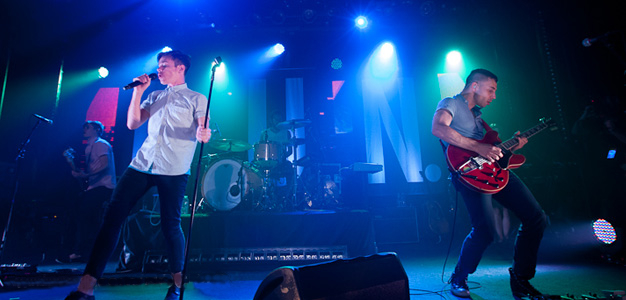
- Fun performing in 2012

Background information
- Origin: New York City, U.S.
- Genres: Indie pop; indie rock; pop rock; baroque pop
- Years active: 2008–2015 (Note: Indefinite hiatus)
- Labels: Nettwerk; Fueled by Ramen
- Spinoffs: Bleachers; Metal Bubble Trio
- Spinoff of: The Format; Anathallo; Steel Train
- Past members: Nate Ruess; Andrew Dost; Jack Antonoff
- Website: ournameisfun.com

Fun (stylized as fun.) was an American pop rock band formed in New York City. The band consisted of vocalist Nate Ruess (of The Format) and multi-instrumentalists Andrew Dost (of Anathallo) and Jack Antonoff (of Steel Train and later of Bleachers).

Fun formed in 2008, and their debut studio album, Aim and Ignite, was released in 2009 to moderate commercial success. The band rose to prominence with the release of their second album, Some Nights, in 2012. The album peaked at number three on the U.S. Billboard 200 chart, and topped Billboard's Top Alternative Albums and Top Rock Albums charts. It spawned their biggest hit singles to date: "We Are Young" featuring Janelle Monáe, "Some Nights" and "Carry On", all of which reached the top 20 on the U.S. Billboard Hot 100 with "We Are Young" peaking at number one and winning Song of the Year at the 55th Annual Grammy Awards; they also won the award for Best New Artist.

== History ==
=== 2008: Career beginnings and formation ===
In February 2008, Nate Ruess's former band the Format split up. Immediately afterwards, Nate Ruess asked Andrew Dost and Jack Antonoff to join his new project. Dost had toured with the Format and provided various instrumentation, and Ruess met Antonoff after the Format toured with Steel Train. The three began working together in New Jersey within a week. Ruess sang melodies while the other two provided music for them. The first demo song the band recorded was "Benson Hedges", which was made available free in Spin's August 20, 2008 article on the band. In November 2008, fun embarked on their first tour opening for Jack's Mannequin. Their first show was played in Denver, Colorado on November 5, 2008. A couple of early demos and covers from other bands were performed. Fun then approached Steven McDonald, who produced the Format's album Dog Problems with Ruess, to produce their debut album. McDonald was enthusiastic about the project and stated, "I can't believe what we're working on here. This crushes anything I've ever done."

=== 2009–2010: Aim and Ignite ===
Recording took place in the fall of 2008. The band's first single, "At Least I'm Not as Sad As I Used to Be" was made available as a free download on the band's Myspace page on April 6, 2009. Aim and Ignite was released on August 25, 2009, and received positive reviews. AbsolutePunk.net's Drew Beringer praised the album, stating it was "what a pop album 'should' sound like" and "the most essential pop album of 2009". AllMusic called the album "progressive, but in the best possible way" and admired Ruess's lyrics for "investigating the larger truths of life...with a witty approach that keeps the songs bubbling merrily along on a positive note". Dave de Sylvia of Sputnikmusic wrote, "Aim and Ignite isn't the most consistent pop album around," but he ultimately commended the album as "a superbly mixed and arranged album made by musicians who clearly understand the limits and potential of pop music". Estella Hung of PopMatters was less impressed with the album. She praised songs "Be Calm" and "The Gambler", but criticized the lyrics and production of the album's early tracks. Hung concluded that while Aim and Ignite is "pretty original to say the least", it "fails to live up to the Format's last outing." Popdose's Ken Shane called the album "an interesting and unusual listen". Shane applauded the album's songwriting and said "many of the songs are really good," but he objected to the "cute" production, desiring to hear the band "in a more stripped-down form." He ended his review with: "I have a similar problem with Dr. Dog, a band that was recommended to me by a number of people. I think much of their recorded work is too fussed over, but when I saw them live and their sound was more stripped down out of necessity, emphasizing their powerful songwriting, I thought they were wonderful. Perhaps the same fate awaits me with Fun." In reviewing the album, The Washington Post called some of the arrangements "theatrical, much like those on Panic! at the Disco's 2005 debut". The album reached number 26 on Sputnikmusic's top 50 albums of 2009. The album peaked at 71 on the U.S. album charts.

Fun began its first North American tour on November 8, 2008, opening for Jack's Mannequin as well as opening for them again in February 2010, followed by their first U.K. appearances in March. In April 2010, Fun supported Paramore's headline tour. The band then embarked on a full U.K. tour in May. On August 4, 2010, Fun announced that they had signed with label Fueled by Ramen. In 2010, Fun's single "Walking the Dog" was used in a commercial for the travel site Expedia.com. Will Noon (formerly of Straylight Run) played drums with Fun on tour, according to Noon's Twitter page. To celebrate the Paramore U.K. tour and the band's new single "Walking the Dog", Hassle Records gave away a free download of an acoustic version of the track.

=== 2011–2015: Some Nights and hiatus ===
On May 17, 2011, the band released "C'mon" as a joint single with Panic! at the Disco, for whom they opened on their 2011 Vices & Virtues Tour. On November 7, 2011, the band announced that their next album would be titled Some Nights. Its first single, called "We Are Young" featuring Janelle Monáe, has since been used in several other media, including television series Gossip Girl, 90210, Glee, and Chuck; commercials for Chevrolet and Apple; and in the trailer for Judd Apatow's film This Is 40. On December 12, 2011, the band's song "One Foot" was available for instant streaming and free download on Nylon's website.

On February 13, 2012, the band released an album stream of Some Nights on their website along with a note from Ruess thanking fans for their ongoing support. It was released on February 21, 2012, through Fueled by Ramen. The band kicked off the start of their North American tour in support of Some Nights on February 29.

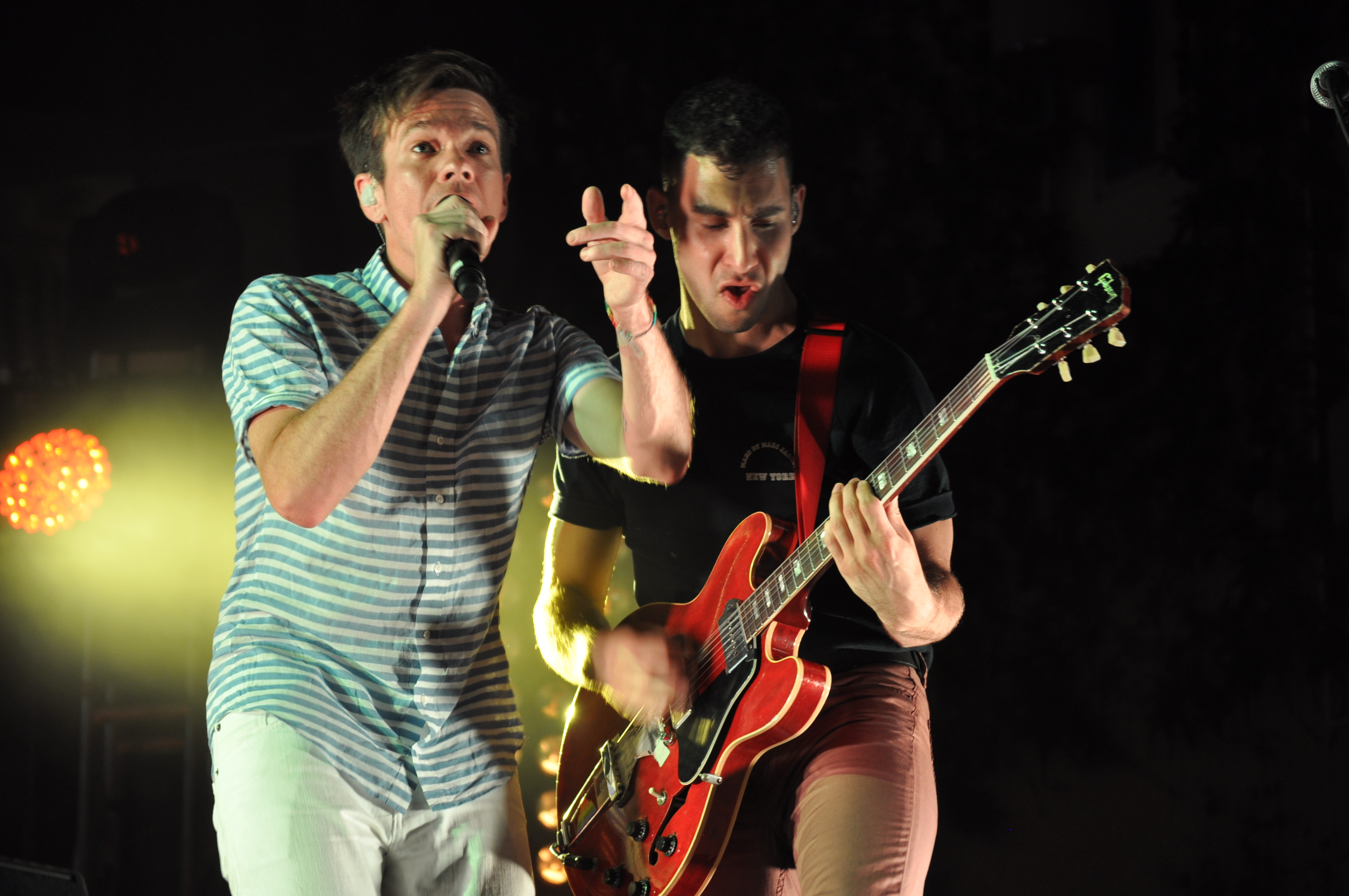
Fun performing in Las Vegas in 2012

On March 7, 2012, Fun's single "We Are Young" reached the No. 1 spot on the Billboard Hot 100 chart. This makes Fun the first multi-member rock band to have a No. 1 Billboard debut on the Hot 100 since Nickelback's "How You Remind Me". On April 11, 2012, Billboard.com announced that Fun's "We Are Young" also made Digital Sales history. As the song was at the No. 1 spot on the Billboard Hot 100 for a sixth consecutive week, it has become the first, and at this time only, song that has ever gained 300,000+ downloads for seven weeks straight. The music video for the album's third single, "Carry On", was released in October 2012. The group performed "Some Nights" and "Carry On" on Saturday Night Live on November 3, and then performed "We Are Young" on the 2012 MTV Europe Music Awards on November 11.

The group performed at the 55th Grammy Awards, held February 10, 2013. Entertainment Weekly predicted that "We Are Young" would bring home the Grammy in the categories Record of the Year and Song of the Year (writing, of the latter, "'We Are Young' is the kind of anthem this category is made for"), and that Some Nights would win for Best Pop Vocal Album. "We Are Young" won the Grammy for Song of the Year and was nominated for Record of the Year. Fun also won the Grammy for Best New Artist. Ruess, after winning for "We Are Young", jokingly said, "I don't know what I was thinking, writing the chorus for this song. If this is in HD, everybody can see our faces, and we are not very young." On February 26, 2013, Fun released the music video for "Why Am I the One".

In September 2013, the band joined Queen for a special version of Queen's hit "Somebody to Love" then as a duet with the more modern version of the band in the form of Queen + Adam Lambert for "Fat Bottomed Girls" at the iHeartRadio Music Festival in Las Vegas. In December 2013, Fun digitally released Before Shane Went To Bangkok: Live in The USA, a live EP with songs from both Aim and Ignite and Some Nights, as well as a recording of "What the Fuck", previously unreleased by the band. A vinyl release of the EP was released in March 2014. On June 18, 2014, Fun performed the song "Harsh Light" on The Tonight Show Starring Jimmy Fallon.

On February 4, 2015, the band announced on its Facebook page and their official website that they were not splitting up, but were taking some time off to pursue other projects. Dost became the lead singer of the band Metal Bubble Trio. Antonoff later became the lead singer of the indie rock band Bleachers, further stating in a 2024 interview with Us Weekly, "I know when something will age well, and that's why I stay with the things that I want to do. There was something very accidental about Fun., which is also what stressed me out about it. It wasn't my band."

== Band members ==
=== Final line-up ===
- Nate Ruess – lead vocals, sampler (2008–2015)
- Andrew Dost – keyboards, piano, guitars, flugelhorn, trumpet, glockenspiel, bass guitar, drums, backing vocals (2008–2015)
- Jack Antonoff – guitars, drums, percussion, bass guitar, keyboards, piano, backing vocals (2008–2015)

=== Touring ===
- Jonathan Goldstein – drums, percussion (2008–2010)
- Jessica Martins – guitars, vocals, keyboards (2008)
- David Lizmi – bass guitar (2008)
- Maggie Malyn – violin (2008)
- Am Wheeldon – bass guitar (2008)
- Nate Harold – bass guitar (2009–2015)
- Emily Moore – guitars, vocals, keyboards, saxophone, maracas, violin (2009–2015)
- Will Yates – bass guitar (2009)
- Ryan Mann Jr. – bass guitar (2009)
- Lee Wilkinson – guitars (2009)
- Alex Townley – guitars (2010–2011)
- Ian Hare – bass guitar (2010)
- Liam O'Keefe – guitars (2010)
- Mike Schey – guitars (2010)
- Will Noon – drums, percussion (2011–2015)
- George Roth – bass guitar (2011)

== Discography ==
- Aim and Ignite (2009)
- Some Nights (2012)

== Awards and nominations ==
Fun is the winner of two Grammy Awards, two Teen Choice Awards, and one Billboard Music Award.

In 2010, they won Best Pop/Rock Song at the Independent Music Awards for "All the Pretty Girls".
