= Direction (album) =

Studio album by the Starting Line
- Released: July 31, 2007
- Recorded: February–May 2007
- Studio: Bay 7, Valley Village, California; Sparky Dark, Calabasas, California
- Genre: Pop-punk; pop rock; power pop
- Length: 40:39
- Label: Virgin
- Producer: Howard Benson

The Starting Line chronology
Based on a True Story (2005)	Direction (2007)	Somebody's Gonna Miss Us (2009)

Singles from Direction
- 1. "Island (Float Away)" Released: June 19, 2007

Direction is the third studio album by American pop punk band the Starting Line, released on July 31, 2007 through Virgin Records. Following the lack of promotion for their 2005 album, Based on a True Story, the band left Geffen Records in late 2005. Early the following year, they signed to Virgin and spent the remainder of 2006 writing and touring. Sessions for the album were recorded at several studios in California from February to May 2007 with producer Howard Benson. Influenced by the work of James Brown, the Starting Line's vocalist and bassist Kenny Vasoli wrote music around simple grooves instead of the uptempo style of the band's earlier material.

In June 2007, the track "Island" was released as the lead single from Direction before the Starting Line embarked on the Warped Tour the following month, during which a music video for the track was released. The album sold 20,000 first-week copies in the US, charting at number 30 on the Billboard 200, and received mostly positive reviews from music critics, with some complimenting the Starting Line's growth and the catchy songs. Following the Warped Tour, the band went on a headlining US tour and co-headlined a tour in the country with Paramore, both of which were in the fall of 2007. In early 2008, the Starting Line performed at the Soundwave Festival in Australia, prior to another headlining US tour.

== Background ==
Geffen Records were unhappy with the demos the Starting Line submitted for their second studio album, telling them to restart the writing process, preventing the band from touring for a year. The band's album Based on a True Story was ultimately released in May 2005. Shortly after its release, Geffen de-prioritized the album and despite the Starting Line's increasing popularity, a lack of promotion for the lead single. From late September to late November 2005, the band went on the Nintendo Fusion Tour. Brian Schmutz of Inkling joined the Starting Line as a touring keyboardist.

On November 3 of that year, the Starting Line announced they had left Geffen Records and were in discussions with other labels. The band were aiming to release another album by early 2006 and had already written 12–15 songs for it at the time, with them spending the next two months meeting with various labels. On January 3, 2006, it was announced the Starting Line had signed to Virgin Records. Virgin president Jason Flom signed the band after watching one of their live performances.

Between the early periods of both February and April 2006, the Starting Line went on a headlining US "Screaming Is for Babies" tour. In an interview during the tour, the guitarist Matt Watts said Schmutz was still a touring member and was expected to appear on their next album. Following the tour's conclusion, the band took a one-to-two month break for writing the album. In June and July 2006, the Starting Line wrote new material and recorded demos of songs. By August of the year, they had written and demo-recorded 12 songs, and were planning to write around 10 more before recording them. In October and November, the band supported the All-American Rejects on their "Tournado 2006" tour in the US.

== Production ==
In February 2007, the Starting Line started recording Direction and by May, they were in the final stages. Recording sessions took place at Bay 7 Studios in Valley Village and Sparky Dark Studio in Calabasas, California. Howard Benson served as producer, while Mike Plotnioff was in charge of recording. Hatsukazu Inagaki was the engineer, with technical assistance from Chris Concepcion. During the sessions, Watts used a variety of Les Paul guitars he owned and some that were borrowed from Benson. The former used that brand of guitars because the sound "is so thick that I don’t need any pedals to fill it out".

Benson added keyboards and programming to the recordings, while session musicians Kenny Aronoff and Jamie Muhoberac were brought in; Aronoff added drums to "21", "Island" and "What You Want", whereas Muhoberac added keyboards to "What You Want". Luis Conti contributed percussion to the track, alongside "21", "Island", "Hurry", "Something Left to Give" and "Need to Love". Chris Lord-Alge mixed the recordings at the Resonate Music studio in Burbank, California, with assistance from Nik Karpen, and Ted Jensen then mastered the recordings at Sterling Sound.

== Music and lyrics ==
Taking influence from the work of soul singer James Brown, vocalist and bassist Kenny Vasoli wrote music for Direction that focused on simplistic grooves, rather than the fast-paced nature of the Starting Line's past work. He would show the other members a rough idea, which they would give their opinions of. From this, the band would work on the idea and develop it into a song. Watts wanted to break away from their pop punk sound, incorporating delay-driven parts, hammer-ons, pull-offs, complex harmonies, and breakdowns similar to the work of Shudder to Think. Vasoli waited until the drums had been recorded before he wrote any bass parts. Due to the drum parts going through a variety of changes, Vasoli thought it would be better to wait until he was recording the bass before writing parts for it. The album's sound has been described as pop punk, pop rock, with comparisons being drawn to music by Motion City Soundtrack and the All-American Rejects.

"Direction" includes elements of southern rock, with its distorted guitar work and pounding drums; the song discusses the themes of growing up and personal development. The uptempo pop punk track "21" recalls the Based on a True Story song "Bedroom Talk" and was compared to the music of Yellowcard. On the track, Vasoli looks back on his age and questions the amount of responsibility he needs. "Are You Alone" is a slow-tempo song that displays Schmutz's piano skill and features layered vocal parts. "Island" started out as a verse section, with what Vasoli called a "pretty-ugly chord" playing constantly, and the Starting Line planned to have White Zombie-esque chords playing over it. The band became stuck on the chorus section and bought a Martin DX1 guitar in an attempt to complete the song, which they succeeded in doing after two days of thinking it over. Laura Marie Brown of Spin said the lyrics detail "an image of a beautiful escape-turned-shipwreck and two lovers weathering the storm of poor timing".

On "Hurry", Vasoli discusses swollen glands, stage presence, and the drafting of a note to his ghost. "Something Left to Give" is an acoustic ballad, which Watts said is about people who expected the Starting Line to write "The Best of Me" again. "I Could Be Wrong" is about taking a chance with one's life and beliefs, regardless of others. The pop-influenced song "Somebody's Gonna Miss Us" was compared to the music of Nada Surf; the song is about people's yearning to hear more of the band's earlier sound and includes Vasoli singing the initials of their debut studio album Say It Like You Mean It (2002). "Need to Love" was the first track written for Direction, which Vasoli said was filled with "visualizations from riding a New York City train to Philadelphia". On the album's closing track "What You Want", Vasoli laments about his songs.

== Release and promotion ==
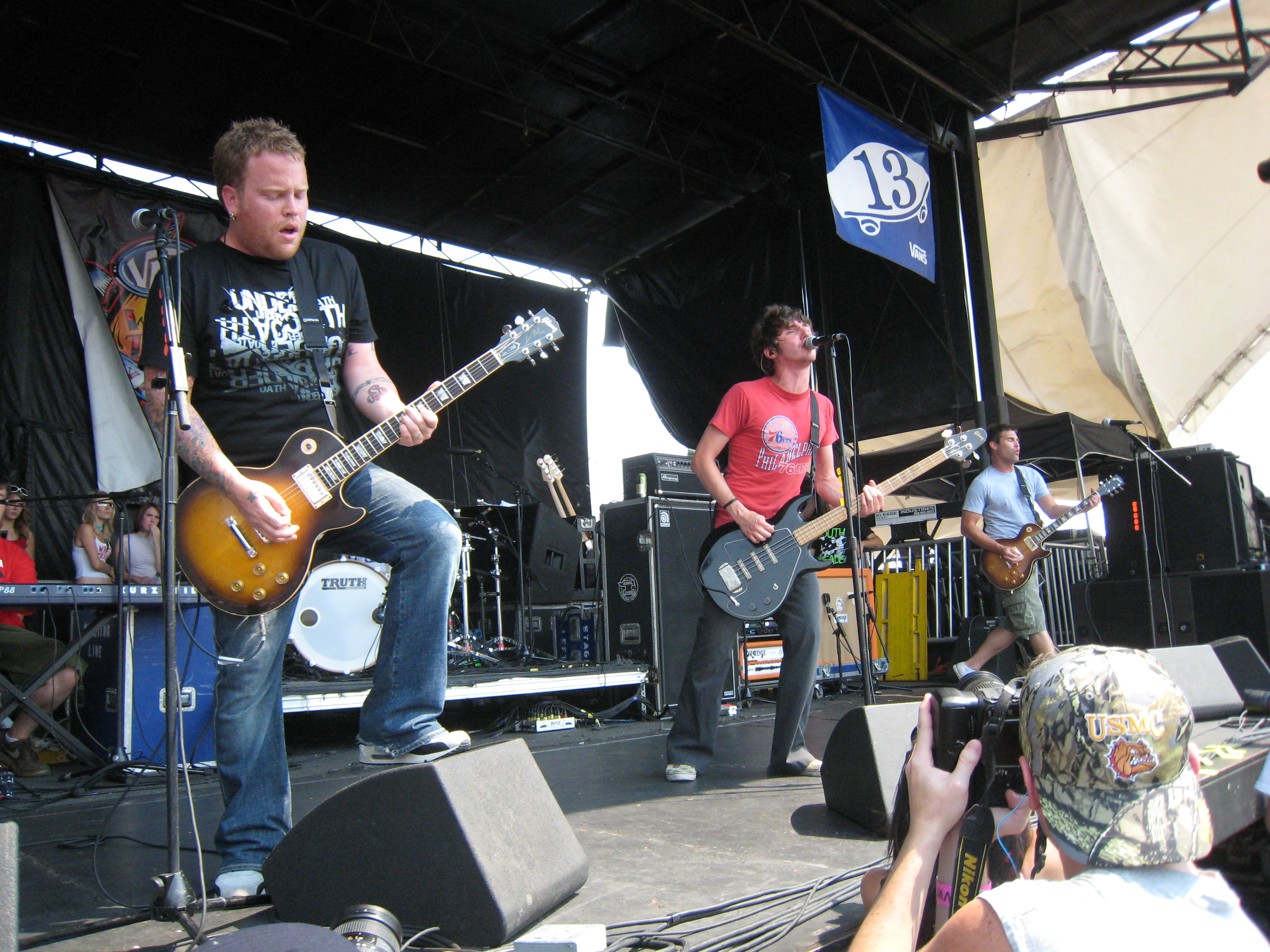
The Starting Line performing on the 2007 Warped Tour.

On May 3, 2007, "Direction" was made available for streaming through the Starting Line's Myspace profile. Four days later, Direction was announced for release in July of that year. "Island" was made available for streaming on May 17, 2007; it was released as a US single on June 19, and serviced to radio a week later. From early July to late August, the Starting Line went on the 2007 Warped Tour. On July 18 of that year, a music video for "Island" that had been filmed in California during early June was released. Direction was made available for streaming on July 27, 2007, and was released in the US on July 31 through Virgin Records. The iTunes and Japanese editions, the latter of which was released in January 2008, both include "Pictures" as a bonus track. In September and October 2007, the Starting Line embarked on a headlining US tour, with support from Permanent Me and Four Year Strong.

In October and November 2007, the Starting Line went on a co-headlining US tour with Paramore. Set Your Goals opened the first half of the tour, while the Almost opened the second half. The Starting Line appeared at the Soundwave Festival in Australia, in February 2008, before returning to the US for a headlining tour in March and April, during which they were supported by Bayside, Four Year Strong, and Steel Train. The Starting Line subsequently appeared at the Bamboozle Left and Bamboozle festivals. Following on from this, the band went on an indefinite hiatus, saying; "Imagine getting your first job ... and doing that exact same job for the rest of your life ... eventually you need to stop for a minute and see what else is out there".

== Reception ==
Professional ratings
Review scores
Source	Rating
AbsolutePunk	85%
AllMusic	3.5/5 stars
Alternative Press	4/5 stars
The A.V. Club	B−
Melodic	4/5 stars
Punk News	2.5/5 stars

Direction was met with mostly positive reviews from music critics. AbsolutePunk founder Jason Tate said the Starting Line conceptualized their vision "to its full potential. The music sounds natural while the songs contain enough to be instantly satisfying yet hold back enough to ensure rewarding repeat listens." AllMusic reviewer William Ruhlmann noted that while it retained the pop punk sound of the band's past releases, the album came across as slightly more "sophisticated in certain ways, particularly in rhythmic terms". In a review for Alternative Press, Jonah Bayer found that while Vasoli lacks "the political prowess of Billie Joe Armstrong or the literary knowledge of Dustin Kensrue", he and the other members "prove they’re more than capable of crafting flawless pop-punk songs that should appeal to anyone with a pulse".

The Aquarian Weekly writer Courtney Muir said the "melody remains thick and the overall tune is catchy" throughout Direction, referring to it as "a definite redemption for the band that has come a long way". The A.V. Club's Aaron Burgess said: "Vasoli now sounds less concerned with impressing little girls and more interested in connecting with their older siblings as a legitimate artist. With more such surprises, he just might break out of character." Melodic reviewer Pär Winberg praised the album for being "a very good piece of plastic" and complimented Benson's "very good" production.

Punk News staff member Tyler Barrett said "direction seems to be exactly what The Starting Line is lacking in their latest release" and that despite having "a handful of enjoyable rock and pop-punk tracks", the album includes "too many struggling grabs that come up empty for it to be considered the mature and developed achievement it was meant to be". Jon Young of Spin criticized the album as being "another formulaic record", but noted it has "compelling moments".

idobi Radio included Direction on their "Best of 2007" list. It has been cited as an influence on the music of the bands State Champs and Real Friends. The album debuted at number 30 on the US Billboard 200, with first-week sales of 20,000 copies. Patty Walters of As It Is has expressed admiration for the album.

== Track listing ==
Track listing adapted from the booklet of Direction. All songs produced by Howard Benson.

No.	Title	Length
1.	"Direction"	3:54
2.	"21"	2:29
3.	"Are You Alone"	3:21
4.	"Island"	3:42
5.	"Hurry"	2:52
6.	"Something Left to Give"	3:34
7.	"Birds"	3:27
8.	"Way with Words"	3:43
9.	"I Could Be Wrong"	3:55
10.	"Somebody's Gonna Miss Us"	2:53
11.	"Need to Love"	3:22
12.	"What You Want"	3:18

Japanese and iTunes bonus track
No.	Title	Length
13.	"Pictures"	3:34

== Credits and personnel ==
Credits adapted from the booklet of Direction.

The Starting Line

- Kenny Vasoli – bass, lead vocals
- Mike Golla – lead guitar, backing vocals
- Matt Watts – rhythm guitar
- Tom Gryskiewicz – drums
- Brian Schmutz – keyboards, backing vocals

Additional musicians

- Howard Benson – keyboards, programming
- Kenny Aronoff – drums (tracks 3, 4 and 12)
- Luis Conti – percussion (tracks 2, 4–6, 11 and 12)
- Jamie Muhoberac – keyboards (track 12)

Production

- Howard Benson – producer
- Mike Plotnikoff – recording
- Paul DeCarli – digital editing
- Hatsukazu Inagaki – engineer
- Chris Concepcion – technical assistance
- Chris Lord-Alge – mixing
- Nik Karpen – mixing assistant
- Ted Jensen – mastering
- Sean Mosher-Smith – creative director
- Mike Joyce – art, design
- Kate McGregor – art coordinator
- Justin Borucki – photography

== Charts ==
Chart (2007)	Peak position
US Billboard 200	30
