= Island (Float Away) =

Single by The Starting Line

from the album Direction
- Released: June 26, 2007
- Recorded: 2007
- Genre: Alternative rock
- Length: 3:54
- Label: Virgin
- Songwriters: Kenny Vasoli, Matt Watts, Mike Golla, Tom Gryskewicz, Brian Schmutz
- Producer: Howard Benson

The Starting Line singles chronology
"Bedroom Talk" (2005)	"Island (Float Away)" (2007)	"Something Left to Give" (2008)

"Island (Float Away)" is the fourth track and first single from The Starting Line's 2007 album, Direction. The song impacted radio on June 26, 2007. The music video for the song was directed by Jay Martin and it takes place on a shipwrecked beach. The music video premiered on July 31, 2007 on TRL. The song hit #21 on the US Modern Rock chart in 2007 and is the band's only charting single on any Billboard chart.

== Track list ==
1. "Island (Float Away)"
