= The Best of Me =

The Best of Me may refer to:

== Music ==
=== Albums ===
- The Best of Me (Bryan Adams album), 1999
- The Best of Me (Rick Astley album), 2019
- The Best of Me (Yolanda Adams album), 2007
- The Best of Me, a 1998 album by Andrea Martin
- Best of Me (Maxi Priest album), a 1991 compilation album by Maxi Priest
- Best of Me, a 2010 compilation album by Daniel Powter

=== Songs ===
- "The Best of Me" (David Foster song), originally the title-track of David Foster's 1983 album; covered by:
  - Kenny Rogers, from The Heart of the Matter, 1985
  - David Foster and Olivia Newton-John, single from David Foster, 1986
  - Cliff Richard, from Stronger, 1989
  - Barry Manilow, from The Complete Collection and Then Some..., 1992
  - Michael Bublé, from Crazy Love (Hollywood edition bonus disc), 2010
- "The Best of Me" (Bryan Adams song), 1999
- "The Best of Me" (Mýa song), 2000
- "The Best of Me" (The Starting Line song), 2002
- "The Best of Me" (Chrisette Michele song), 2007
- "Best of Me" (Sum 41 song), 2007
- "Best of Me" (Daniel Powter song), 2008
- "Best of Me", the theme song for Daisy of Love, 2009
- "Best of Me" (Ratt song), 2010
- "Best of Me", a song by Christina Aguilera from Lotus, 2012
- "Best of Me", a song by BTS in collaboration with The Chainsmokers from Love Yourself: Her, 2017
- "The Best of Me", a song by Michael Learns to Rock from Still, 2018
- "Best of Me", a song by NEFFEX, 2019
- "Best of Me", a song by John K
- "Best of Me", a song by Craig Davis from 22, 2022
- "Best of Me", a song by Swedish singer Efraim Leo during Melodifestivalen 2021
- "Best of Me" (Josh Ramsay song), 2022
- Best of Me (Katie Price song)
- "Best of Me", a 2024 song by the Zutons from The Big Decider

== Other uses ==
- The Best of Me (novel), a 2011 novel by Nicholas Sparks
  - The Best of Me (2014 film), a film adaptation of the Sparks novel
- The Best of Me (2007 film), a Spanish drama film
- The Best of Me (TV special), a 2008 concert television special by Regine Velasquez
