= Initial (disambiguation) =

Besides its most common meaning as the first letter of any word or name, an initial is a letter at the beginning of a written work, a chapter or a paragraph that is larger than the rest of the text and often decorative.

Initial may also refer to:

- Initial (linguistics), part of a syllable that precedes the syllable nucleus in phonetics and phonology
- Rentokil Initial, a British business services group
- Initial Records, an American record label
- Initial (album), the debut album by the band Person L
- Initial, a British film and television production company owned by Banijay UK Productions

== See also ==
- Acronym, the initial letters of the elements of a multipart organisational name
- Given name#Initials, the first letter of a person's given name or middle name or both.
- Initialism, an unpronounceable acronym
- Theory of Deadly Initials
