= With Hopes of Starting Over... =

With Hopes of Starting Over…

EP by The Starting Line
- Released: June 25, 2001
- Recorded: Portrait Recording Studio, Lincoln Park, New Jersey
- Genres: Pop punk, emo
- Length: 17:23
- Labels: Drive-Thru, We the People; DTR #23
- Producers: Chris Badami, The Starting Line

The Starting Line chronology
| With Hopes of Starting Over… (2001) | Say It Like You Mean It (2002) |

Professional ratings
Review scores
| Source | Rating |
|---|---|
| Allmusic | 1.5/5 stars |
| Punktastic | 4/5 stars |

With Hopes of Starting Over... is the debut EP from the American rock band The Starting Line, released on June 25, 2001 by Drive-Thru Records. It featured four original songs, two of which later reappeared on their full-length album Say It Like You Mean It, and a cover of Starship's "Nothing's Gonna Stop Us Now".

In November 2005, a sixth song from the recording session surfaced, titled "Song for Her". The acoustic guitar driven song had been cut from the CD for reasons unknown, but was ultimately released online on the band's PureVolume profile.

"Three's a Charm" featured a music video, as well as a music video for "Leaving" recorded during the Say It Like You Mean It album, As well as "Saddest Girl Story" being rerecorded.

== Track listing ==
All tracks are written by The Starting Line except where noted.

| No. | Title | Length |
|---|---|---|
| 1. | "Leaving" (EP Version) | 3:30 |
| 2. | "Saddest Girl Story" | 3:23 |
| 3. | "Three's a Charm" | 4:14 |
| 4. | "Greg's Last Day" | 2:42 |
| 5. | "Nothing's Gonna Stop Us Now" (Diane Warren, Albert Hammond) | 3:32 |
| Total length: | | 17:23 |

== Personnel ==
The Starting Line

- Mike Golla – Lead guitar, backing vocals
- Tom Gryskiewicz – Drums
- Kenny Vasoli – Vocals, bass guitar
- Matt Watts – Rhythm guitar, backing vocals

Production

- Chris Badami – Producer, engineer, mixing
- John Paddock – Assistant engineer
- Gene Grimaldi – Mastering at Oasis Mastering
- Richard Reines, Stefanie Reines – A&R

Artwork

- Shawn Corrigan – Band photography
- Matt Hanemann – Design & layout
