= Somebody's Gonna Miss Us =

Live album by The Starting Line
- Released: November 10, 2009
- Recorded: 2008
- Genre: Pop punk, Alternative
- Length: 1:13:14
- Label: Image Entertainment

The Starting Line chronology
Direction (2007)	Somebody's Gonna Miss Us (2009)	The Early Years (2012)

Somebody's Gonna Miss Us is a two-disc live/video album by The Starting Line consisting of material that was recorded during the band's final hometown show at the Electric Factory in Philadelphia, Pennsylvania. The set features a full-length concert and an exclusive documentary following the band throughout the tour.

== History ==
In December 2008, it was announced that the band would release a video album, titled Somebody's Gonna Miss Us, early next year. On August 13, 2009, The Starting Line announced the release of a CD/DVD album. The album was recorded in 2008 during the band's farewell tour.

== Track listing ==
No.	Title	Length
1.	"Given the Chance"	3:08
2.	"Greg's Last Day"	2:33
3.	"Almost There, Going Nowhere"	3:35
4.	"Direction"	4:18
5.	"Up & Go"	3:22
6.	"Inspired by the $"	3:01
7.	"Are You Alone"	3:46
8.	"The Drama Summer"	3:34
9.	"Ready"	4:18
10.	"This Ride"	3:45
11.	"Bedroom Talk"	4:13
12.	"A Goodnight's Sleep"	4:19
13.	"Surprise, Surprise"	4:01
14.	"Something Left to Give"	4:14
15.	"Island"	4:25
16.	"Somebody's Gonna Miss Us"	5:52
17.	"Photography"	6:21
18.	"The Best of Me"	4:29
Total length:		1:13:14

== Personnel ==
- Kenny Vasoli - lead vocals, bass guitar
- Matt Watts – rhythm guitar, backing vocals
- Mike Golla – lead guitar, backing vocals
- Tom Gryskiewicz – drums, percussion
- Brian Schmutz – keyboards, backing vocals
