= Based on a True Story (The Starting Line album) =

Studio album by The Starting Line
- Released: May 10, 2005
- Recorded: July–September 2004
- Studios: Various: Mission; redruM; Bay 7; Sparky Dark; Trax East
- Genres: Emo, pop punk
- Length: 46:23
- Labels: Drive-Thru, Geffen
- Producers: Tim O'Heir; Howard Benson; Eric Rachel

The Starting Line chronology
The Make Yourself at Home EP (2003)	Based on a True Story (2005)	Direction (2007)

Singles from Based on a True Story
- 1. "Bedroom Talk" Released: April 12, 2005

Based on a True Story is the second studio album by American pop punk band the Starting Line. The group's label Drive-Thru Records had a distribution deal which allowed MCA Records to acquire their bands. After MCA Records was absorbed into Geffen Records in mid-2003, the band spent most of 2004 writing and demoing songs for their next album. Following pre-production in July 2004, the band began recording for Based on a True Story, finishing in September. The album was recorded at various studios in New York state and California. Separate sessions were produced by Tim O'Heir, Howard Benson and Eric Rachel.

Prior to the album's release, "Bedroom Talk" was issued as a single in April 2005, and the band went on tour debuting a handful of songs from the album. Based on a True Story was released through Drive-Thru and Geffen Records on May 10. Peaking at number 18 on the Billboard 200, the album received mixed to positive reviews. Following its release, the band went on the Warped Tour throughout the summer. While on the tour, a music video was released for "Bedroom Talk". Soon after, Geffen de-prioritized the album, which resulted in the band leaving the label in December. Further tours in the UK and the US followed.

== Background ==
The Starting Line formed in 1999, signing with independent label Drive-Thru Records shortly afterwards. The band's debut album Say It Like You Mean It, released in July 2002, was a joint release by Drive-Thru and major label MCA Records. MCA's distribution deal allowed it to acquire Drive-Thru Records' bands over a period of time. By the time the group sold around 300,000 copies, the band was signed to MCA Records, who saw the group's potential. Vocalist Kenny Vasoli said they were content with the label, based on the label's success with contemporaries New Found Glory and Blink-182. Following the conclusion of a US tour with Sum 41 in April 2003, the band took a brief break before they started writing for their next album.

Say It Like You Mean It's lone single "The Best of Me" received attention from MTV2, and was to be released to radio while the group performed on the Warped Tour in the summer. However, MCA Records was absorbed by Universal Music Group (UMG) subsidiary Geffen Records in mid-2003, which resulted in its staff and roster being moved to Geffen. According to guitarist Matt Watts, "We ended up on Geffen, and it just seemed like no one there would assume responsibility for our band." On meeting people from the label, the group were told they would be treated like a new act, which left them disappointed.

In November, they finished writing and were aiming to record their next record in early 2004. Despite this earlier claim, the group said they had only finished writing in January 2004. They subsequently spent over half of the year writing new material and recording demos in Vasoli's basement. After the demos were unexpectedly leaked on the Internet, the band's fans thought it was their next album, but they were just "rough sketches" of what the band was going for. According to Watts, when the band played the demos for their label, the label responded by playing New Found Glory's Catalyst (2004). The label people said: "'These demos aren't this CD, you guys should sound like this.' And that's not us."

== Composition ==
According to Watts, Geffen Records wanted the band to write a Simple Plan-esque record that had a pop sensibility to it that the label could release to the radio. The label pushed the band to write singles, however, the group "fought to the death" to write the record they wanted rather than Say It Like You Mean It, Part 2. According to Vasoli, most of the themes on Based on a True Story stem from having the songs but being frustrated by having to wait to get into the studio to record them. He thought the band had "definitely got more comfortable" with the songwriting process. Vasoli claimed the band expanded their musicality with Based on a True Story. When asked about the allusions to cameras in the song titles, they said that they "didn't realize there were so many camera references, I thought it was just in 'Making Love' [...] I think it's just about being in the Spotlight, not necessarily the camera".

"Inspired by the $" came about when Vasoli attempted to write a song their record label would view as a hit. Fed up, he wrote "Inspired by the $", a song which satisfied his "musical needs more than theirs." According to Vasoli "Bedroom Talk" was inspired by the knowledge he would lose his virginity to someone who would "love me for longer than that night". With this in mind, he wanted the song's lyrics to symbolize the "physical and passionate sides of love" while being honest. Vasoli viewed "Photography" as a typical love song that he wanted to tell "the actual feeling of love". Watts considered the song the band's "November Rain". Similar to "Inspired by the $", "Ready" was another song Vasoli felt went against what the label wanted him to do. They wanted the song to have a verse/chorus formula, which he refused to write.

== Recording ==
Geffen Records attempted to force the group into a direction which they did not want to go in and wanted Neal Avron to produce the album, but the band was determined to do their "own thing" according to Watts. Pre-production began on July 6 and lasted for two weeks while the band worked on 15 songs. During pre-production, Watts felt for the first time that the band was making a record as opposed to a bundle of songs that they simply liked. On August 1, it was announced that the band was one week into recording. On the same day, drummer Tom Gryskiewicz' drum parts were completed. On September 22, following eight weeks of work, recording was finished. Watts called the process "great and really laid back".

Tim O'Heir was enlisted as Vasoli enjoyed Say Anything's ...Is a Real Boy (2004), which O'Heir produced. He produced and engineered "Inspired by the $", "Surprise, Surprise", "Photography", "Autography", "Artistic License", "Stay Where I Can See You", "The B-List", "Ready", "Cut! Print It" and "The World". These tracks were recorded at Mission Studios in Brooklyn, New York. Watts said O'Heir gave the songs an "organic feel" where "it's not all computed and Pro Tools and stuff like that". Additional engineering was done by Oliver Strauss. Additional recording took place at redruM Studios. David "Garo" Yellin arranged the strings on "Photography", and performed cello on the track. David Gold, Amy Kimbal and Taguchi Hiroka played violins on the track. Benjy King played the Hammond B3 organ on "Photography" and "Cut! Print It". Say Anything frontman Max Bemis contributed backing vocals on "Ready". Watts said it was "an honor" to have Bemis sing on the track as the band were big fans of Say Anything. Bemis was invited to sing after O'Heir learned that he was in the city for a gig.

Vasoli said Geffen were not satisfied with how some songs sounded and wanted them to re-record the singles. The band then began working with Howard Benson. Benson produced a new version of "The World", and "Bedroom Talk", with recording taking place at Bay 7 Studios, Valley Village and Sparky Dark Studio in Calabasas, California. The tracks were recorded by Mike Plotnikoff, with additional engineering by Eric Miller. They were also edited using Pro-Tools by Paul DeCarli. Benson also played keyboards and provided programming on the tracks. Eric Rachel produced and engineered "Making Love to the Camera" recorded at Trax East in New York. Shawn Corrigan served as production assistant. Additional production was done by Vasoli. All the recordings were mixed by Chris Lord-Alge, with assistance from Dimtar Krnjaic, at Resonate Music in Burbank, California. Greg Calbi mastered the recordings at Sterling Sound in New York City.

== Release ==
The Starting Line went on a brief tour with Park in October 2004. In February 2005, the band embarked on a US tour with Days Away, JamisonParker and Further Seems Forever, which lasted for six weeks. In April, the group went on tour with Armor for Sleep, Mae, and Suicide Pack, and debuted several new songs: "Surprise, Surprise", "Bedroom Talk", "Ready", "Inspired by the $", and "Photography". Around this time, the band filmed a music video for "Bedroom Talk", which was done on a budget of $35,000. On April 12, 2005, "Bedroom Talk" was released as a single. On April 17, "Inspired by the $" was made available for streaming via the group's PureVolume account, followed by three more songs on April 22. Following this, they appeared at The Bamboozle and Flipside festivals. Based on a True Story was made available for streaming on May 1, 2005, before being released by Drive-Thru and Geffen Records nine days later. The Japanese edition of the album included "Nights and Weekends" as a bonus track. It was later released in Canada on May 24 and in the UK on August 15. Fans who ordered the album within a week of pre-orders being posted received an autographed booklet. Everyone who pre-ordered was entered in a contest to win a Fender Telecaster guitar, and a lesson from a band member. Two runners-up received an assortment of Nike clothing.

To promote its release, the group did a few in-store performances, and appeared at the Y100 radio festival in Philadelphia, Pennsylvania. Between mid-June and mid-August, the group went on the 2005 edition of Warped Tour. On July 11, the music video for "Bedroom Talk", directed by Corey Petrick, was released. Shortly afterwards, Geffen Records de-prioritized the album and, as a result, despite the band's increasing popularity, provided very little promotion for the single. Vasoli said of the situation: "It was like to go from such a perfect high point and have momentum going so well, then have it slowed down so much by the label". From late-September to late-November, the group went on the 2005 edition of the Nintendo Fusion Tour. On November 3, Alternative Press reported that the band had left Geffen Records and was in discussion with other labels.

The band's departure from Geffen Records was made official in mid-December. According to Watts, the band talked with Geffen president Jordan Schur who understood their concerns and the reasons they wanted to leave the label. "He finally gave us the option to leave, and we did that." Vasoli added that it was "probably like an hour[-long phone] call with them really hashing it out". Vasoli also said that to be released from their contract with Geffen, the band "forfeited rights to the recordings of Based On A True Story. We might run into trouble if we ever try to re-record that stuff". In January 2006, the band co-headlined a UK tour with MxPx, with support from the Matches and I Am the Avalanche. In February and March, the group headlined the Screaming Is for Babies tour, with support from Copeland, Gatsbys American Dream, Cartel, and New Atlantic. The album was released on vinyl in 2013.

== Reception ==
Professional ratings
Review scores
Source	Rating
AbsolutePunk	83%
AllMusic	2/5 stars
Melodic	2/5 stars
Punknews.org	4/5 stars
Rolling Stone	3/5 stars

Based on a True Story charted at number 18 on the Billboard 200 chart. The album received mixed to positive reviews from critics. AbsolutePunk founder Jason Tate wrote that the band's sound was "still catchy, the music still bouncy" with "plenty of guaranteed sing along choruses". He considered it an unexpected release: "I figured it would be good, I never expected it to be great. I'm glad I was wrong." He concluded by calling it "uplifting and incredibly fun to listen to". AllMusic reviewer Johnny Loftus drew a comparison between the band's earlier release The Make Yourself at Home EP (2003) and Based on a True Story. He said the album incorporated acoustic instrumentation, placing focus on Vasoli's "edge-of-tears" vocals, as well as "favoring busy breaks that distract from actual rocking". With this album, Loftus noted that the band "matured into a more grandiose version" of New Found Glory.

Kaj Roth of Melodic magazine mentioned how the group mixed emo and pop punk on Based on a True Story, comparing it to "having Armor For Sleep and Autopilot Off making a record together". Roth thought the album contained "some truly great stuff, a few ok songs and unfortunately 2-3 fillers," suggesting the band should have made an EP instead of an album. Punknews.org reviewer Meg Reinecker noted how the group had used the preceding three years to mature "both vocally and instrumentally". David Wild of Rolling Stone wrote that the band "made their sad songs much less cheesy" on the album. He said the "fresh-faced punk ballads" were "way more palatable" compared to "most emo bloodletting, but it's still too depressive and not as songful as it ought to be". Wild concluded by noting the band knows "how to make sweetly wordy pop out of over-the-top romantic naivete".

== Track listing ==
All songs written by the Starting Line.

No.	Title	Producer	Length
1.	"Action"		0:29
2.	"Making Love to the Camera"	Eric Rachel	3:31
3.	"Inspired by the $"	Tim O'Heir	2:57
4.	"Bedroom Talk"	Howard Benson	4:04
5.	"Surprise, Surprise"	O'Heir	3:59
6.	"Photography"	O'Heir	6:05
7.	"Autography"	O'Heir	3:39
8.	"Artistic License"	O'Heir	3:08
9.	"Stay Where I Can See You"	O'Heir	2:48
10.	"The B-List"	O'Heir	4:36
11.	"The World"	Benson	3:08
12.	"Ready"	O'Heir	4:07
13.	"Cut! Print It"	O'Heir	3:45

Japanese bonus track
No.	Title	Length
14.	"Nights and Weekends"	3:15

== Personnel ==
Personnel per booklet.

The Starting Line

- Kenny Vasoli – vocals, bass, guitar, Wurlitzer, piano, glockenspiel, bongos, synths, harpsichord
- Matt Watts – guitar
- Tom Gryskiewicz – drums, percussion
- Mike Golla – guitar, percussion, celeste

Additional musicians

- David "Garo" Yellin – string arranger and cello on "Photography"
- David Gold – violin on "Photography"
- Amy Kimbal – violin on "Photography"
- Taguchi Hiroka – violin on "Photography"
- Benjy King – Hammond B3 on "Photography" and "Cut! Print It"
- Max Bemis – background vocals on "Ready"
- Howard Benson – keyboards, programming

Production

- Tim O'Heir – producer, engineer (tracks 3, 5–10, 12 and 13)
- Oliver Strauss – additional engineer
- Howard Benson – producer (tracks 4 and 11)
- Mike Plotnikoff – recording
- Eric Miller – additional engineer
- Paul DeCarli – Pro-Tools editing
- Jon Nicholson – drum tech
- Keith Nelson – guitar tech
- Eric Rachel – producer, engineer (track 2)
- Shawn Corrigan – production assistant
- Kenny Vasoli – additional production
- Chris Lord-Alge – mixing
- Dimtar Krnjaic – assistant engineer
- Greg Calbi – mastering
- Morning Breath Inc. – art direction, design
- Josh Rothstein – photography

== Chart positions ==
Chart (2005)	Peak position
US Billboard 200	18
