= The Positives (album) =

Studio album by Person L
- Released: November 17, 2009
- Recorded: February–March 2009
- Genres: Garage rock, emo
- Length: 51:32
- Label: Academy Fight Song
- Producer: Aaron Marsh

Person L chronology
Initial (2008)	The Positives (2009)

Professional ratings
Review scores
Source	Rating
Rock Sound	8/10
AbsolutePunk	85%

The Positives is the second and final full-length studio album by American rock band Person L, released through Academy Fight Song on November 17, 2009.

== Background and production ==
On January 24, 2008, "I Sing the Body Electric" was posted on the group's Myspace profile, followed by "Goodness Gracious" on February 4. In February 2009, it was revealed that the band's next album would be released later in the year. The Positives was produced and engineered by Aaron Marsh, with recording starting on February 10. On March 2, frontman Kenny Vasoli posted an update from the studio: "I have four more songs to sing, [and] there are a few guitars left to track along with some general what-have-yous." On March 9, it was announced that recording was finished. 14 songs were tracked, with 12 of them appearing on the album. The album was mixed at the end of the month by Matt Goldman, and mastered by Alex Lowe.

== Composition ==
The first single from the album is "Untitled", which remained without a title as tribute to its simple nature. Vasoli said he'd prefer to concentrate on what the song was saying, rather than have "some weird thing that represents how I was feeling or something like that... It felt right that it didn't need a title. I wanted to say something that was very powerful and say it over and over again." Vasoli wrote the song at his home in Philadelphia, in his basement. After a four-minute period of creativity and a guitar hook, he came up with the song and it was said to be the spark he needed to put The Starting Line behind him and advance with Person L. Themes of personal growth and triumph over pain are intertwined through the song.

Vasoli said the album consisted of ""blues, grunge, post-punk, and good old-fashioned rock and roll". Spin said the album features a "surprisingly diverse sound", something Vasoli calls "classic Person L". The magazine described the sound as a mix of garage rock and downtempo emo, touched with hints of R&B, rockabilly, and ambient influences. The diverse mix of sounds and genres was then compared to "the creative, boundary-pushing sound" of bands such as Jawbox and Fugazi. Vasoli also refers to the change in sound from the band's first album, Initial; "As far as songs go, there aren't a whole lot of songs you can compare from the first record to the second," although he does say the "new album has similar vibes on it". He described The Positives as "more of an old school garage rock-and-roll sort of record" with a lot more "funk and soul".

== Release ==
In April and May 2009, the band went on a US tour alongside Mae and Barcelona. In May 2009, Vasoli revealed that the album was mixed and would need to be mastered. He also said he was aiming to have it released in August. The band went on tour in June and July 2009 with Ace Enders and the Dangerous Summer. On September 30, The Positives was announced for release in two months' time. In addition, the title-track was posted on the group's Myspace, and the track listing and artwork was revealed. On November 3, "Untitled" was released for free download via Spin. On November 12, the band released five songs to PureVolume for streaming, followed by a full album stream on MySpace on November 14. The album was released on November 17. In November and December, the band went on tour with John Nolan and Brian Bonz. The album was released on vinyl in December. On March 1, 2010, a music video was released for "Goodness Gracious". In March and April, the band supported Copeland on their farewell US tour. On April 29, "Good Days" was made available for free download.

== Track listing ==
1. "Hole in the Fence" — 4:53
2. "Good Days" — 4:28
3. "The Positives" — 2:50
4. "Goodness Gracious" — 3:23
5. "New Sensation" — 2:35
6. "Stay Calm" — 4:40
7. "Sit Tight" — 3:11
8. "Loudmouth" — 3:22
9. "Changed Man" — 6:09
10. "Pleasure Is All Mine" — 3:23
11. "Untitled" — 5:26
12. "I Sing the Body Electric" — 7:12

== Personnel ==
Personnel per sleeve.

Person L

- Kenneth Vasoli – vocals, guitar, bass, vibes
- Nathaniel Vaeth – Rhodes piano, guitar
- Brian Medlin – drums, percussion, vocals
- Ryan Zimmaro – drums, percussion
- Charles Schneider – bass

Additional musicians

- Aaron Marsh – additional guitar, piano, vibes, vocals

Production and design

- Aaron Marsh – producer, engineer
- Matt Goldman – mixing
- Alex Lowe – mastering
- Chris Masciotti – layout, design
