= Anyways =

Anyways may refer to:

- Anyways (album) or the title song, by Young Nudy, 2020
- Anyways (EP) or the title song, by the Starting Line, 2016
- "Anyways", a song by Arctic Monkeys, 2018

== See also ==
- Anyway (disambiguation)
