= Make Yourself At Home =

Make Yourself At Home may refer to:

- Make Yourself at Home, the English translation of the title of the BBC television programme Apna Hi Ghar Samajhiye
- The Make Yourself at Home EP by The Starting Line
- Make Yourself at Home, a TV Series aired on Magnolia Network
