= Body Language (band) =

American music group

Body Language is an American electronic/alternative music group formed in 2008 in Hartford, Connecticut, consisting of Matthew Young, Grant Wheeler, Angelica Bess, and Ian Chang.

== History ==
Body Language was originally formed by Young and Wheeler when they started making dance music and remixes for a weekly party they curated at a bar called Vegas Blvd in Hartford. Soon they began to incorporate vocals from Bess and the original trio was formed.

Subsequently, they moved to the neighborhood of Bedford Stuyvesant in Brooklyn, New York. Around that time, they released their first record on a sister label of Ghostly Records, Moodgadget Records, entitled Speaks. In their first months in Brooklyn, Wheeler and Young worked on Passion Pit's second LP Manners. After working with Passion Pit, they started writing their second EP Social Studies late in the summer of 2009. By the fall of 2009, they met and started collaborating with Theophilus London and subsequently became his backing band. Through this connection they met Ian Chang, who completed the quartet. With this lineup they did their first North American tour with Zero 7.

In early spring of 2010, they did a North American tour with Sia. Once they returned from that tour, Wheeler and Young moved their studio in Bedford Stuyvesant to a different location and built a studio in a warehouse space. After the completion of their studio, they started cowriting sessions with Kenny Vasoli, which marked the beginning of the band Vacationer.

In the fall of 2010, they self-released their second EP Social Studies in 2010 on Bandcamp. The tracks "You Can" and "Falling Out" were met with critical acclaim.

In the winter and spring of 2011, the band went on tour with the band Two Fresh. The side project Big Friendly Giant was started by Young on the road inspired by the instrumental hip hop of J Dilla, Mux Mool and Two Fresh. During that same year Wheeler, Young and Vasoli were finishing the first Vacationer record Gone. The attention received from the self-release of Social Studies got Body Language signed to San Francisco-based record label, Om Records, which subsequently rereleased the record and boosted the profile of the band.

In 2012 the band was completing their third release, Grammar. The band went on a North American tour with The Hood Internet and started more tracks on the road.

Om Records released Grammar in 2013. Wheeler and Young were writing and producing Vacationer's follow up record Relief for much of the year.

In 2014 the band self-released the Infinite Sunshine EP. The single and EP garnered much attention and was given press on outlets such as The Fader and The Music Ninja. The band went on a North American tour with Rubblebucket and wrote and released a beat for every city they played in and entitled the project Tour Beats Diary.

In November 2016 they released the album Mythos.

== Writing process ==
The members all have a piece in the creative process. Song ideas generally start with Young who passes it off to either Bess or Wheeler. Bess writes lyrics and vocal parts with Young. Chang adds drum ideas when the song is first performed live. Wheeler and Young finish the recording, production and mixing. Many song ideas are written while on tour as a part of the creative feedback process.

== Discography ==
- Speaks (EP) – Moodgadget Records, 2009
- Social Studies (EP) – Self Released, 2010
- "You Can / Social Studies" (single) – Double Denim Records, 2011
- Social Studies Deluxe Edition (EP) – Om Records, 2011
- "Social Studies" (single) – Om Records, 2011
- Grammar (EP) – Lavish Habits, 2013
- Grammar (LP) – Lavish Habits, 2013
- Infinite Sunshine (EP) – Self Released, 2014
- Mythos (LP) - Om Records, 2016
- Travel Guide - 2020
