= Person L =

American rock band

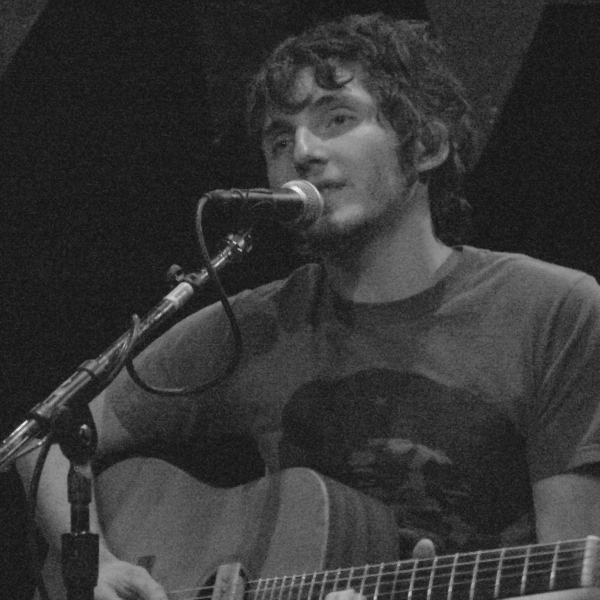
- Kenny Vasoli playing at the Bowery Ballroom in New York City, 2009

Background information
- Origin: Churchville, Pennsylvania, United States
- Genres: Emo; experimental rock; post-hardcore; indie rock
- Years active: 2006–2010; 2019
- Labels: Human interest; Academy Fight Song; Scylla
- Spinoff of: The Starting Line; The Prize Fight; The Suicide Pact
- Past members: Kenny Vasoli; Brian Medlin; Charles Schneider; Nate Vaeth; Ryan Zimmaro; Brian Schmutz

Person L was an American rock band fronted by Kenny Vasoli, of the pop-punk band The Starting Line. Vasoli formed Person L in the winter of 2006 as an outlet to explore other musical styles. The group also consisted of drummers Brian Medlin and Ryan Zimmaro (previously of the band The Prize Fight), bassist Charles Schneider (previously of the band The Suicide Pact) and keyboardist and guitarist Nate Vaeth.

== History ==
Person L was founded by the Starting Line vocalist/bassist Kenny Vasoli in winter 2006. Vasoli then brought members of the Minor Times, Inkling, the Prize Fight and the Suicide Pact into the group. The band performed their first show on December 22 in Lansdale, Pennsylvania. Person L released a split single with Weatherbox in May 2008. He initially wrote the song, "Storms", while on the road with The Starting Line. Person L's debut record Initial was released on August 5 on Vasoli's own label, Human Interest.

During the summer of 2008, Person L went on tour with Anthony Green and Good Old War in support of their debut record. The tour consists of bands all from Philadelphia, Pennsylvania, whose lead singers are from other bands that have had success. Keith Goodwin of Good Old War was formerly of Days Away and Anthony Green of Circa Survive. Following the tour with Anthony Green, Person L toured shortly with Motion City Soundtrack, followed by a tour in support of Underoath. Following that, Person L went on tour with Steel Train and spent summer 2009 touring with Mae and then Ace Enders. In 2010 they opened for Copeland on their farewell tour, also with I Can Make A Mess Like Nobody's Business.

Person L's second album, The Positives was released on November 17, 2009 on Academy Fight Song/Human Interest. The band embarked on a tour with John Nolan and Brian Bonz on November 10, 2009. The record was released in the UK on Scylla Records, Continental Europe on Arctic Rodeo Records and in Australia on Taperjean Records.

Following the end of a tour supporting Manchester Orchestra in September 2010, Vasoli disbanded Person L and started a new project, Vacationer. The band did, however, reunite for a one-off show at the Brooklyn Bazaar in New York City in May 2019.

== Members ==
Final line-up

- Kenny Vasoli – lead vocals, lead guitar
- Brian Medlin – drums, percussion, backing vocals
- Charlie Schneider – bass, backing vocals
- Nate Vaeth – keyboards, rhythm guitar
- Ryan Zimmaro – drums, percussion

Former members

- Brian Schmutz – keyboards

== Discography ==
=== Albums ===
- Initial (2008)
- The Positives (2009)
