= The Make Yourself at Home EP =

EP by The Starting Line
- Released: November 25, 2003
- Recorded: 2002, 2003
- Genre: Acoustic rock
- Length: 23:37
- Label: Drive-Thru Records
- Producer: Kenny Vasoli, Bob Jones

The Starting Line chronology
Say It Like You Mean It (2002)	The Make Yourself at Home EP (2003)	Based on a True Story (2005)

The Make Yourself at Home EP is an acoustic EP by American pop punk band The Starting Line released on 25 November 2003.

== History ==
The Make Yourself at Home EP contains six acoustic songs, including five new songs and an acoustic version of "The Best of Me", previously released as an electric version on The Starting Line's 2002 studio album, Say It Like You Mean It. The enhanced version of the EP contains video footage of the band performing unreleased tracks, titled "Classic Jazz" and "Surprise, Surprise". Recorded in two sessions in producer Bob Jones' bedroom and singer Kenny Vasoli's basement, the EP's first five tracks were initially planned to be released on 12 August 2003. However, the release date was postponed as a result of Vasoli recording a sixth song, titled "Lasting Impressions", in the back of the band's bus while on tour. A DVD with the same name was released simultaneously, and features an acoustic set performed by the band at Skate & Surf 2003 in Asbury Park, New Jersey.

== Track listing ==
No.	Title	Length
1.	"Make Yourself at Home"	3:57
2.	"Selective"	3:35
3.	"Playing Favorites"	4:02
4.	"The Night Life"	4:01
5.	"The Best of Me"	4:45
6.	"Lasting Impressions"	3:17
Total length:		23:37

== Personnel ==
- Kenny Vasoli - lead vocals, bass guitar
- Matt Watts – rhythm guitar
- Mike Golla – lead guitar, backing vocals
- Tom Gryskiewicz – drums, percussion
