= Anyway =

Anyway may refer to:

== Albums ==
- Anyway (Family album), 1970
- Anyway (Anamanaguchi album), 2025

== Songs ==
- "Anyway" (CeeLo Green song), 2011
- "Anyway" (Chris Brown song), 2015
- "Anyway" (Duck Sauce song), 2009
- "Anyway" (George Hamilton IV song), 1971
- "Anyway" (Martina McBride song), 2006
- "Anyway", by Genesis from The Lamb Lies Down on Broadway, 1975
- "Anyway", by Honeycrack, 1996
- "Anyway", from Anyway (Family album), 1970
- "Anyway", by Journey from Look into the Future, 1976
- "Anyway", by Paul McCartney from Chaos and Creation in the Backyard, 2005
- "Anyway", by Rebecca Black, 2019
- "Anyway", by Steve Perry from For the Love of Strange Medicine, 1994
- "Anyway", by Telepopmusik from Angel Milk, 2005
- "Anyway", by Vixen from Live & Learn, 2006
- "Anyway", by White Town from Peek & Poke, 2000

== Other ==
- Anyway Records, an American record label

== See also ==
- Anyway Gang, a Canadian alternative rock supergroup
- Anyways (disambiguation)
