= The Best of Me (The Starting Line song) =

2002 single by the Starting Line

Single by the Starting Line

from the album Say It Like You Mean It
- Released: June 16, 2003
- Studio: Media Vortex (Burbank, California)
- Genre: Pop-punk; emo pop; emo
- Length: 4:18
- Label: Drive-Thru
- Songwriters: Kenny Vasoli; Matt Watts; Tom Gryskiewicz; Mike Golla
- Producer: Mark Trombino

The Starting Line singles chronology
"Three's a Charm" (2002)	"The Best of Me" (2003)	"Leaving" (2003)

Music video
- "The Best of Me" on YouTube

"The Best of Me" is a song by American rock band the Starting Line from their debut studio album Say It Like You Mean It (2002). The song was released as the album's lead single on June 16, 2003 through Drive-Thru Records. It was written by vocalist/bassist Kenny Vasoli, guitarist Matt Watts, drummer Tom Gryskiewicz, and guitarist Mike Golla.

== Background ==
"The Best of Me" was first released as a single on June 16, 2003; it was pushed to modern rock radio stations in the U.S. on July 22 of that year.

== Music video ==
On October 27, 2002, a music video for "The Best of Me" was posted on Launch.com. The video starts with a guy attempting to impress a girl by playing music from a boombox outside of her residence. When the music stops, the band appear and start performing. A second music video was posted online for "The Best of Me" through MTV.com on June 13, 2003. The video received significant rotation on MTV2.

== Reception ==
While "The Best of Me" did not chart well during its original release—only reaching the bottom region of the UK Singles Chart—it became the band's most popular song. Likewise, it has been widely considered an key pop punk track from the 2000s. Kelefa Sanneh, writing for The New York Times, called it "infectious"; NME writers called it an "essential" pop punk track. Billboard ranked it at no. 12 on a ranking of the genre's best love songs, with columnist Hannah Dailey writing, "Love can be complicated. No one knows that better than The Starting Line, whose youthful 2003 hit examines how mature conversations, forgiveness and time spent apart are sometimes needed to make a long-term relationship work." Cleveland.com ranked "The Best of Me" at number 33 on their list of the top 100 pop-punk songs. Alternative Press included the song in the genre's most "influential" tracks, and also ranked it at number 35 on their list of the best 100 singles from the 2000s.

Kellin Quinn, frontman of Sleeping with Sirens, placed the song among the 10 "Songs That Changed My Life" for Kerrang!; the same publication ranked the Say It Like You Mean It album among the genre's best, singling out "Best of Me" as "one of the genre's most sing-alongable tunes." The song became one of the most-played songs at Emo Nite, the popular traveling event series hosting era-specific performances and karaoke, in the 2010s–20s. In 2020, the song was certified gold by the Recording Industry Association of America.

== Credits and personnel ==
Personnel per booklet.

The Starting Line

- Kenny Vasoli – vocals, bass guitar
- Matt Watts – rhythm guitar
- Tom Gryskiewicz – drums
- Mike Golla – lead guitar

Production

- Mark Trombino – producer, engineer, mixing
- Steven Marcussen – mastering
- Tim Stedman – art direction, design
- Marco Orozco – design
- Micah Panzich – design
- Justin Stephens – photography

== Charts ==
Weekly chart performance for "The Best of Me"
Chart (2003)	Peak position
UK Singles (Official Charts)	79

== Certifications ==
Certifications and sales for "The Best of Me"
Region	Certification	Certified units/sales
United States (RIAA)	Gold	500,000^{‡}
^{‡} Sales+streaming figures based on certification alone.
