= Anyways (EP) =

EP by The Starting Line
- Released: February 19, 2016
- Recorded: 2015
- Genre: Pop punk, alternative rock
- Length: 9:14
- Label: Downtown
- Producer: Will Yip

The Starting Line chronology
| The Early Years (2012) | Anyways (2016) |

Singles from Anyways
- 1. "Anyways" Released: December 17, 2015

Anyways is an EP by The Starting Line, and is the band's first release containing new material since 2007. The record was produced by Will Yip.

== History ==
On December 14, 2015, The Starting Line announced the release date and cover art for Anyways. Pre-orders were made available on the same day through the band's official website. The release date was originally scheduled for February 5, 2016, but was postponed until February 19, 2016, due to vinyl pressing issues. The first single, titled "Anyways", was released on December 17, 2015, and the band released an official music video for the track on February 2, 2016. The EP is available exclusively on 7-inch vinyl and through digital media outlets.

When profiled by Philly Voice, frontman Kenny Vasoli revealed a little about the direction of the new material. "It's still punk rock," he said, speaking on the band's long-awaited release. "We're always going to sound like The Starting Line. I feel like I've stepped back far enough that I can really identify with what I liked about pop-punk and what I appreciate about it now."

== Track listing ==
| No. | Title | Length |
|---|---|---|
| 1. | "Anyways" | 2:57 |
| 2. | "Quitter" | 2:16 |
| 3. | "Luck" | 4:01 |
| Total length: | | 9:14 |

== Personnel ==
- Kenny Vasoli – lead vocals, bass guitar
- Matt Watts – guitars
- Mike Golla – guitars, backing vocals
- Tom Gryskiewicz – drums, percussion
- Brian Schmutz – keyboards, backing vocals
