= Initial (album) =

Album by Person L

Studio album by Person L
- Released: August 5, 2008
- Genres: Emo, indie rock, post-hardcore, experimental rock
- Length: 35:19
- Label: Human Interest
- Producer: Kenny Vasoli

Person L chronology
Initial (2008)	The Positives (2009)

Professional ratings
Review scores
Source	Rating
AbsolutePunk	86%

Initial is the debut album from the band Person L, released on August 5, 2008. Kenny Vasoli self-recorded the album in his home studio in late 2007–2008 and released it through his record label, Human Interest. Several of the songs originate from demos he worked on while on tour with The Starting Line.

== Release ==
An early version of "Storms" was made available for download on the band's Myspace account on March 1, 2007. On July 1, "Sunshine" was posted online. In January and February 2008, the band toured with Steel Train on their east coast headlining tour. On February 4, the band announced Initial was in the process of being mixed. On May 29, it was revealed that the album was completed and would be self-released in August. On June 2, the album's artwork was revealed. On June 10, the band posted "Help Yourself" on their Myspace profile. The band appeared at Bonnaroo Music Festival, followed by Bring the Music! Festival. On July 16, the album version of "Storms" was posted on Myspace, followed by "Wooden Soldiers" on July 21.

Initial was made available for streaming via PureVolume on July 27, before being released on August 5 through the band's own label, Human Interest. In August and September, the band went on tour with Anthony Green and Good Old War. In September and October, the band supported Chiodos and Motion City Soundtrack on their co-headlining US tour. Following this, the band went on tour with Underoath in October. In November, the name went on tour with Mock Orange and Audrye Sessions. They ended the year with three holiday shows with Envy on the Coast.

== Track listing ==
1. "Wooden Soldiers" – 4:38
2. "Holy Hell" – 2:10
3. "Help Yourself" – 4:09
4. "Canyonlands" – 5:48
5. "Born in the Rainy Days of May" – 4:20
6. "We're Gonna Run Out of Road" – 4:17
7. "Sunshine" – 5:21
8. "Storms" – 4:36

== Trivia ==
2. "Holy Hell" is inspired by the band Drive Like Jehu, according to frontman Kenny Vasoli.
