= Gone (Vacationer album) =

Studio album by Vacationer
- Released: March 20, 2012
- Genre: Rock
- Length: 34:26
- Label: Downtown

Vacationer chronology
Gone (2012)	Relief (2014)

Professional ratings
Aggregate scores
Source	Rating
Metacritic	72/100
Review scores
Source	Rating
AllMusic	3.5/5 stars
Rolling Stone	3/5 stars

Gone is the debut studio album by American band Vacationer. It was released in 2012 under Downtown Records.

== Critical reception ==
The album received generally favorable reviews from music critics scoring 72 out of 100 on aggregate website Metacritic.

The Line of Best Fit wrote that "warm harmonies and click-clack percussion pervades everything and suffocates anything that might have been an interesting execution ... you can have any style of music you like as long as you want a profoundly beige, gloopy style of music." Alternative Press called the album "textured indie pop buoyed by tropical percussion, soulful crooning, quirky samples and atmospheric keyboards."

== Track list ==
No.	Title	Length
1.	"Everyone Knows"	3:18
2.	"Good as New"	3:24
3.	"Trip"	2:53
4.	"Dreamlike"	3:47
5.	"No Rules"	2:02
6.	"Gone"	3:49
7.	"Having It All"	3:24
8.	"Summer End"	3:37
9.	"Great Love"	3:18
10.	"Farther"	2:01
11.	"Be with You"	2:53
