= The Starting Line =

American pop-punk band

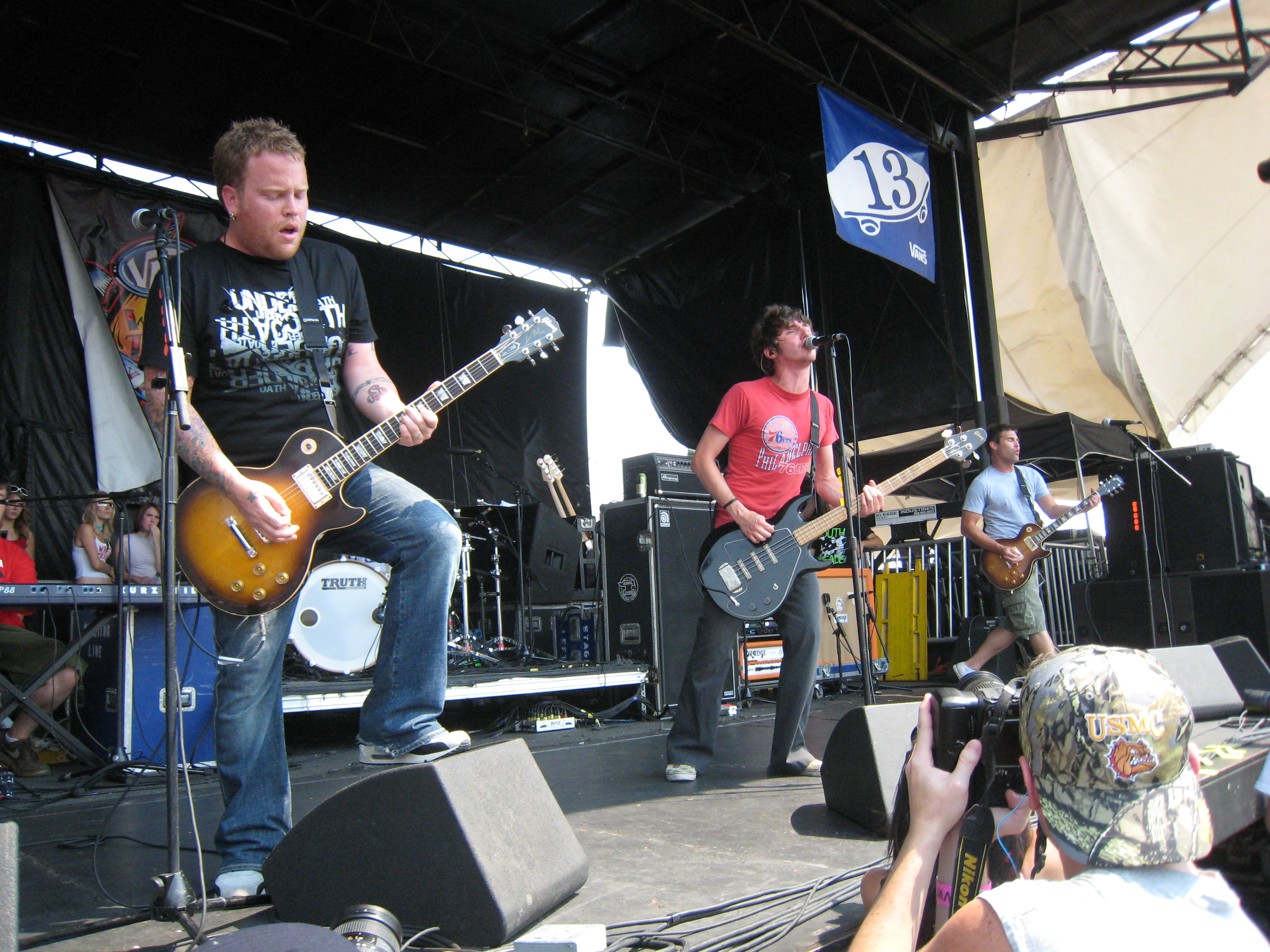
- The band performing at Vans Warped Tour in 2007

Background information
- Origin: Churchville, Pennsylvania, U.S.
- Genres: Pop-punk; emo; alternative rock
- Years active: 1999–2008; 2009; 2011; 2012–present
- Labels: Drive-Thru; Geffen; Virgin; Downtown; Memory Music; Lineage Recordings
- Spinoffs: Person L; Vacationer; The Traded Series; The Seventy Six; Film
- Members: Kenny Vasoli; Matt Watts; Mike Golla; Tom Gryskewicz; Brian Schmutz
- Website: startinglinerock.com

The Starting Line is an American pop-punk band formed in Churchville, Pennsylvania in 1999. They are currently based in Philadelphia. The band first gained fame in the early 2000s. After nearly two decades without a new studio album, the band made a major comeback in September 2025 with the release of their fourth full-length record, Eternal Youth.

== History ==
=== Early years (1999–2001) ===
In 1999, the band that would become The Starting Line was initiated when guitarist Matt Watts, from his Connecticut dorm room, sent out emails to people from the AOL member directory who had similar bands in their profiles. He sent out many emails including one vocalist/bassist Kenny Vasoli. It asked if the 14-year-old Vasoli, who was at that time in a band called Smash Adams, was interested in "Jamming and shit", as the message title read. Kenny was the only person to respond to Matt's emails. Only a few weeks later, Vasoli found himself rehearsing with his future band-mates Watts, guitarist Mike Golla and drummer Tom Gryskewicz. According to Matt Watts, the guys "jammed and wrote a couple of songs".

From there, the band started to book shows. One of the shows was with the band Saves the Day. Saves the Day was putting out a record-release show for their second album Through Being Cool in Harrisburg, PA. Soon, the band started touring under the name Sunday Drive, selling out home-made merchandise and a self-recorded demo cassette titled Four Songs. Their first official release was a three-way split with The Jimmy Tuesday Band and The Commercials contributing three songs each, released on KickStart Audio in 2000. The three songs on the split from the band were 'West Girl Scout Road', 'Forever in a Day' and 'Nothing Short of a Miracle'.

Sunday Drive was soon approached by We the People Records and asked to produce a recording session (the We the People Records Sessions). Set for a release in December 2000, the twelve songs were initially planned to become the band's debut full-length on We the People Records, but they ended up serving only as demos for tracks on future releases, as the band signed with Drive-Thru Records in April 2001. They later found out that the name Sunday Drive was already taken by a Christian rock band, so they changed their band name to the Starting Line. The band has said there is no significance behind the name, it was the only name they all could agree upon.

=== With Hopes of Starting Over EP (2001) ===
On Drive-Thru, they soon released their debut EP With Hopes of Starting Over... on July 17, 2001. The album contained an earlier version of the song 'Leaving', which was a fan-favorite from the We The People sessions, and would eventually become the band's second single on their debut full-length album Say It Like You Mean It.

=== Say It Like You Mean It (2002) ===
On July 16, 2002, almost exactly one year after the release of their EP, the full-length Say It Like You Mean It followed. The songs ranged from energetic and fast-paced to melancholy and calm, dealing with performing on stage ("Given the Chance"- "I can't wait to hit the stage/and say hello/To Jersey"), vacation ("Left Coast Envy"- "Vacation's everything we need/Can I sell this sunrise/In return for a sunset?") and getting even with Vasoli's ex-girlfriend ("Up & Go", "Hello Houston", "Cheek to Cheek", among others). The single "The Best of Me" and its two music videos, as well as the second single "Leaving", received heavy radio and TV airplay, securing the Starting Line a spot on the Warped Tour. A clip of "Up & Go" was played during an episode of the short-lived television series from Fox, John Doe. The episode aired December 13, 2002, and was entitled 'The Mourner.' "Up & Go" was also included in the full-length trailer for the movie She's The Man, which starred Amanda Bynes. In 2003 the band appeared on Jimmy Kimmel Live, performing the song "The Best of Me".

=== The Make Yourself at Home EP (2003) ===
Due to their desire to put out new material, the band decided to release an all-unplugged EP, recorded in three sessions over the following year. The first three songs ("Make Yourself at Home", "Selective", and "Playing Favorites") (recorded in The Prize Fight's Bob Jones' bedroom in August 2002), the second session ("The Nightlife" and acoustic version of "Best of Me") (recorded in Vasoli's basement in March 2003) and the last track ("Lasting Impressions") (recorded on the band's touring bus in April 2003) became The Make Yourself at Home EP, released on November 25, 2003. The CD and the DVD version issued simultaneously, featuring an acoustic set performed live at Skate & Surf 2003 in Asbury Park, New Jersey, would be their last releases put out solely on Drive-Thru Records, as The Starting Line was signed by Geffen Records soon afterwards.

=== Based on a True Story (2005) ===
Their major label debut, Based on a True Story, came out in May 2005. Lyrically, the band dissociated themselves from the post-relationship formula that was predominant on their previous records. The album is punctuated by several more aggressive songs, written to spite the band's record label. "Inspired by the $" featured lyrics that are directed at Geffen: "Someone/Get to the point/Get it across!/To the boys at the top of the ladder I'm climbing up/I have my doubts". Another section of the song refers to a meeting the band had with the label's executives, where the Starting Line was asked to write more radio-friendly songs in the vein of New Found Glory's Catalyst (2004) and recreate "Best of Me" ("Just stay the same way/Do it like you did it before/Remain the same shape." The album was far more successful than the band's 2002 effort and sold 42,000 copies within its first week, as opposed to its predecessor's 11,000. The release was followed by the semi-headlining Nintendo Fusion Tour with Fall Out Boy, kicking off in September 2005. The band brought with them a new addition to their live performances, keyboardist Brian Schmutz. A friend of Vasoli's, the two had short lived side-project called Statue in 2004. A few dates into the tour, the Starting Line were, at their request, released from their record deal with Geffen. Vasoli describes their time with Geffen: " It was kind of like having a sort of hot girlfriend that never talks to you. You say, "Oh yeah, I 'm dating this supermodel, but she's been in France for three years and doesn't really call me... but she promises that when she gets back we're REALLY gonna start to get serious. It was always an imaginary relationship." In 2005 their song "The World" appeared on the video game Burnout Revenge and again on the television series American Idol in 2011.

=== Direction (2007) ===
In early January 2006, the band signed with Virgin Records. The band released their third full-length album Direction on July 31, 2007, containing the single "Island". The album had songs like "What You Want", "21", "Birds" and "Direction". "Island" was the group's lone charting single, peaking at No. 21 on the Billboard Modern Rock charts. The album peaked at No. 30 on the Billboard 200 chart, but fell off the chart four weeks later. The band completed the 2007 Warped Tour and began their nationwide tour with Paramore in October.

=== Hiatus and reunion (2008-2011) ===
In March 2008 the band announced in an e-mail and on Absolutepunk.net they would be going on a break in order for Ken and Brian to explore Person L, Matt and Tom to experiment with the group The Seventy Six, and Mike to spend time with his two daughters and also play with The Traded Series. Matt Watts became a band manager for Red Light Management, managing the bands Fake Problems, Like Lions, New Atlantic, and Hit The Lights. He has since worked in executive positions for Hard Rock Cafe, Fender Musical Instruments Corporation and Vans. The band stated, "They will continue The Starting Line if and when the time is right."

In April 2009, Kenny Vasoli hinted that the Starting Line may actually be returning sooner than 2011, saying "it's looking good, may even be earlier. I hung with Matt and Tom the other day, we all are still in love with one another." On November 10, 2009, The Starting Line released their first Live CD/DVD entitled "Somebody's Gonna Miss Us." The Live CD/DVD documents the band's formation and growth through their last tour and final show at Bamboozle 2008. In December 2009, the Starting Line had a reunion concert at the Theater of Living Arts. The Starting Line guitarist Matt Watts stated on the website AbsolutePunk, that "this doesn't mean that TSL are back together....It simply means that we're taking a break from our break, and wanted to play a fun show in Philadelphia and continue to focus on our lives outside of TSL" (Kohl 1). The Starting Line added a second holiday show in Philadelphia at the Trocadero Theater due to the fact that the first holiday show scheduled for, sold out in a little over an hour and the band would like to give their local fans a better chance to see them. Towards the end of their set, Kenny Vasoli announced the band's reunion.

The band played the Australian Soundwave Festival in February 2011. Matt Watts explained that they "didn't want to pass up this opportunity to hang out, have fun, and play with some really great bands," but again stated, "this doesn't mean that TSL are back together, and that we don't plan on doing a US tour any time in the near future." In May 2011, at Slam Dunk Records Leeds music festival, the band played a 50-minute set during which Kenny Vasoli announced "People keep asking us when we're getting back together, and the answer I have is yesterday. And what happens when bands get together? They write music. So, we have a new song for you." The song is entitled 'Luck'.

In late June 2012, the band posted a countdown timer on their website. Upon completion, the website was updated with information about a tour celebrating the 10-year anniversary of their debut album Say It Like You Mean It. The tour would include the band playing the entire album from start to finish. In 2012, frontman Kenny Vasoli formed a side band, Vacationer, which released their debut album, Gone, in June of that same year.

The Starting Line reunited once again for a Christmas show in 2013 at the Starland Ballroom in Sayreville, New Jersey. On July 11, 2014, it was announced on the band's official website that they would be playing another holiday show on December 26, 2014, at the Trocadero in Philadelphia. According to an article on propertyofzack.com, Kenny Vasoli confirmed on stage that the band would be releasing new material in 2015. Said article also features a very low quality video of a new song. On December 14, 2015, the band announced a new EP titled Anyways. The title track was released as the lead single on December 18, 2015. The EP marked the band's first studio release in nine years. After years of touring with the band, Schmutz was also confirmed as a full-time member.

=== Anyways EP (2015) ===
On December 14, 2015, the band announced a new EP titled Anyways. The title track was released as the lead single on December 18, 2015. Anyways marked the band's first studio release in 9 years. The title track appeared in a 2016 episode, series 7, episode 21 of the television series The Vampire Diaries.

=== New music and beyond (2023) ===
During the first of their two 2023 holiday shows on December 7, 2023, in Philadelphia, the band played a new song called "Blame". It was the first new song the band released since the Anyways (EP) in 2015. Kenny announced before playing the song that it would be released "TBA", along with more music to come. The band played "Blame" again the following night, on their way to selling out back-to-back shows at the venue Underground Arts in their hometown.

The band was referenced in Taylor Swift's song "The Black Dog" from her 2024 album The Tortured Poets Department. Their reference in the song prompted Instagram and Facebook posts thanking Taylor for the "name check". In the posts, the band referenced #4OTW, indicating their fourth album is in the works.

During their holiday shows in December 2024, the band introduced another new song named "Granted". Kenny said that the band has been making new music.

=== Eternal Youth (2025) ===
On June 4, 2025, the band announced that their 4th studio album, Eternal Youth, would be released on September 26, 2025. Along with the album announcement, the band released an official music video for their newest single "Sense of Humor." The band stated that the album would be released by themselves, independently, on their new imprint Lineage Recordings. The album was produced by Will Yip, with mixing by Rich Costey, and mastering by Howie Weinberg. Two further singles were lifted from the album: "Circulate" on July 31, and "I See How It Is" on the album's release day, September 26. In an interview with Valentino Petrarca from The Aquarian, Kenny states he tried to make the album with as little special effects as possible to deliver a more genuine punk sound.

== Touring ==
The Starting Line performed at the Vans Warped Tour on six occasions during 2002, 2003, 2005, 2007, two dates in 2019 and three dates in 2026. The Starting Line has toured throughout four continents including North America, Europe, Asia, and Australia.

On March 1, 2019, the band announced that they were going to celebrate the 20th anniversary as a band by joining the Vans Warped Tour for their 25th anniversary in San Francisco and Atlantic City. They later announced 10 other tour dates in Boston, Los Angeles, Cleveland, Chicago Riot Fest, Denver, Dallas, New York, and their hometown of Philadelphia.

On January 18, 2022, the band announced that they were going to be playing at the When We Were Young Festival in October 2022 in Las Vegas, NV. The festival will feature many well-known bands from the "scene" era including Paramore, My Chemical Romance, the Used, Dashboard Confessional, Avril Lavigne, Jimmy Eat World, Alkaline Trio and many others.

In 2023, the band played nineteen shows, the most since 2007, which will include their two 2023 Holiday Shows. The band embarked on a leg of the Wet Hot All-American Summer Tour in support of The All American Rejects along with New Found Glory and The Get Up Kids, playing eleven shows. They also played in various festivals including Adjacent Festival, So What Music Festival and Ohio Is For Lovers Festival. During a few shows on the Wet Hot All-American Summer Tour, lead singer and bassist Kenny Vasoli alluded to the band returning to touring in 2024.

In November 2023, it was announced that the band would be playing the When We Were Young in October 2024 in Las Vegas. They will be playing Say It Like You Mean It in its entirety.

On March 25, 2024, the band announced that bassist and lead singer Kenny Vasoli would be playing as a featured guest of Boys Like Girls on July 13, 2024 at a show at Foxwoods Resort and Casino.

On April 7, 2024 the band teased "DM us "ENVY" to learn more..." and a picture that read "Left Coast Envy", a reference to a song on their debut album Say It Like You Mean It. The next day the band announced a show in Los Angeles at The Novo for June 21, 2024.

On April 9, 2024 it was announced that they would be playing in a festival called Lake Tahoe Is for Lovers, presented by Hawthorne Heights, supporting them, The All-American Rejects and more.

On September 4, 2024 it was announced on their Facebook page that they would be returning to the United Kingdom after 9 years to play in the 2025 Slam Dunk Music Festival held in London on Saturday May 24 and Sunday May 25 in Leeds.

On September 9, 2024 the band announced that they would be playing the 8123 Fest in Mesa, AZ on Saturday January 18, 2025. The band will be sharing the stage with The Maine, Real Friends, Hellogoodbye among others.

On October 29, 2024 it was announced on the band's Facebook page that they would again be playing the When We Were Young festival in Las Vegas on Saturday October 18, 2025. On February 25, 2025 the band announced they'd be playing an additional show, on Sunday October 19.

On December 13, 2024 the band announced that they would be playing the 2025 'Let's Go Music Fest' in Crownsville, MD on Saturday June 7, 2025. The band will be sharing the stage with Third Eye Blind and Hot Mulligan.

On January 30, 2025 the band was announced as appearing at the Orlando, FL show of the 30th anniversary Vans Warped Tour slated for November 15 & 16, 2025.

On February 13, 2025 it was announced that the band would be playing the All Your Friends Fest on Saturday June 28, 2025, sharing the stage with Four Year Strong, The Veronicas, Boys Like Girls, Underoath and headliner Rise Against.

On March 25, 2025 the band announced they'd be "cruising the high seas with longtime amigo and famously good dude Andrew McMahon on his "Holiday From Real." This is a cruise ship concert festival sailing from Miami to Puerto Plata, Dominican Republic February 28 - March 4, 2026. They are supporting McMahon's bands Andrew McMahon In The Wilderness, Jack's Mannequin and Something Corporate, along with The Maine.

On April 8, 2025 the band announced that they would be embarking on their first headlining tour in 17 years. The name of the tour is called The Eternal Youth Tour and shows along the way will be featuring bands such as Armor for Sleep, Finch, Knucklepuck, Oso Oso, and Real Friends, among others.

On April 20, 2026 they announced on their Facebook page that they would be embarking on a 19-show fall tour supporting The Story So Far (band) along with UltraQ.

== Reconnect, Annual Holiday Gathering ==
The band has hosted an annual holiday show for many years. In some years they've hosted multiple shows, with one show in Philadelphia and another in New Jersey or New York City. The band has recently branded their annual holiday shows as 'Reconnect: Annual Holiday Gathering'.

Year	Location(s)	Venue
2002	Philadelphia	TLA
2003	Sayreville, NJ & Philadelphia	Starland Ballroom & Trocadero Theater
2004	Philadelphia	Franklin Music Hall
2005	Philadelphia	Franklin Music Hall
2006	Philadelphia	Electric Music Factory
2007	Philadelphia	TLA
2009	Philadelphia	TLA
2010	Sayreville, NJ	Starland Ballroom
2012	Philadelphia	Electric Factory
2013	Sayreville, NJ	Starland Ballroom
2014	Philadelphia	The Trocadero
2015	Sayreville, NJ	Starland Ballroom
2016	Philadelphia	Union Transfer
2017	New York City	Irving Plaza
2018	Philadelphia	Franklin Music Hall
2019	Philadelphia & New York City	Franklin Music Hall & Webster Music Hall
2020	Live at Studio 4	Virtual due to COVID-19
2021	Sayreville, NJ & Philadelphia	Starland Ballroom & Franklin Music Hall
2022	New York City	Palladium Times Square
2023	Philadelphia	Underground Arts
2024	Philadelphia	TLA
2025	Philadelphia	TLA & The Fillmore
2026	Philadelphia	TLA & The Fillmore

== Legacy ==
The staff of Consequence ranked the band at number 33 on their list of "The 100 Best Pop Punk Bands" in 2019.

The staff of Loudwire ranked the album 'Say It Like You Mean It' at number 9 on their "50 greatest pop punk albums of all-time" in 2023.

Andrew Sachter of BrooklynVegan ranked 'Eternal Youth' at number 16 on his list of "50 Best Punk Albums of 2025".

In April 2020, Alternative Press (magazine) listed 'Say It Like You Mean It' as one of the top 40 pop-punk albums of the 2000s.

== Band members ==
- Kenny Vasoli – lead vocals, bass guitar (1999–2008, 2009, 2011, 2012–present), keyboards (2005–2007), rhythm guitar (2005–2007, 2025–present)
- Mike Golla – lead guitar, backing vocals (1999–2008, 2009, 2011, 2012–present)
- Tom Gryskiewicz – drums, percussion (1999–2008, 2009, 2011, 2012–present)
- Matt Watts – rhythm guitar (1999–2008, 2009, 2011, 2012–present)
- Brian Schmutz – keyboards, backing vocals (2007–2008, 2009, 2011, 2012–present; touring 2005–2007)

== Discography ==
=== Studio albums ===
List of studio albums, with selected peak chart positions and sales
Title	Details	Peak chart positions		Sales
Title	Details	US	US Heat.	Sales
Say It Like You Mean It	Release date: July 16, 2002; Label: Drive-Thru	109	1	US: 306,000
Based on a True Story	Release date: May 10, 2005; Label: Geffen	18	—	US: 152,000
Direction	Release date: July 31, 2007; Label: Virgin	30	—	US: 20,000 (first week)
Eternal Youth	Release date: September 26, 2025; Label: Lineage Recordings	—	—	
"—" denotes a recording that did not chart or was not released in that territory.

=== Live albums ===
List of live albums, with selected details
Title	Details
Somebody's Gonna Miss Us	Released: November 10, 2009; Label: Image Entertainment
Based on a True Story Live at Studio 4	Released: August 13, 2021; Label: Memory Music
Direction Live at Studio 4	Released: August 13, 2021; Label: Memory Music
The Best of Live at Studio 4	Released: August 13, 2021; Label: Memory Music

=== Compilation albums ===
List of compilation albums, with selected details
Title	Details
The Early Years	Released: October 31, 2012; Label: Drive-Thru

=== Music videos ===
Song	Year	Director
"Three's a Charm"	2001	Unknown
"The Best of Me"	2002	Jeff Gordon
"Leaving" data-sort-value="" style="background: var(--background-color-interactive, #ececec); color: var(--color-base, inherit); vertical-align: middle; text-align: center; " class="table-na" | Steven Oritt| rowspan="2"	2002	Steven Oritt
"Bedroom Talk"	2005	Corey Petrick
"Island (Float Away)"	2007	Jay Martin
"Anyways"	2016	Rocco Avallone
"Sense of Humor"	2025	Lupe Bustos
"Circulate"	2025	Lupe Bustos
"I See How It Is"	2025	Lupe Bustos
"Granted"	2025	Britain Weyant
"Curveball"	2026	Britain Weyant
"Blame"	2026	Britain Weyant

=== DVDs ===
Title	Details
The Make Yourself at Home: Acoustic DVD	Released: November 2003; Label: Drive-Thru
Bastards of Young Documentary DVD	Released: July 14, 2006; Label: Shannon Hartman
Somebody's Gonna Miss Us DVD	Released: November 10, 2009; Label: Imagine Entertainment

=== Extended plays ===
List of EPs, with selected peak chart positions
Title	Details	Peak chart positions
Title	Details	US Heat.
With Hopes of Starting Over...	Released: June 25, 2001; Label: Drive-Thru	—
The Make Yourself at Home EP	Released: November 25, 2003; Label: Drive-Thru	10
Anyways	Released: February 19, 2016; Label: Downtown	—
"—" denotes a recording that did not chart or was not released in that territory.

=== Singles ===
List of singles, with selected peak chart positions
Title	Year	Peak chart positions		Certifications	Album
Title	Year	US Modern	UK	Certifications	Album
"Three's a Charm"	2002	—	—		With Hopes of Starting Over...
"The Best of Me"	2003	—	79	RIAA: Gold	Say It Like You Mean It
"Leaving"	2003	—	—		Say It Like You Mean It
"Bedroom Talk"	2005	—	—		Based on a True Story
"Island (Float Away)"	2007	21	—		Direction
"Something Left to Give"	2008	—	—		Direction
"Somebody's Gonna Miss Us"	2009	—	—		Direction
"Anyways"	2016	—	—		Anyways
"Sense of Humor"	2025	—	—		Eternal Youth
"Circulate"	2025	—	—		Eternal Youth
"I See How It Is"	2025	—	—		Eternal Youth
"—" denotes a recording that did not chart or was not released in that territory.

=== Additional tracks ===
Year	Title	Album
2002	"I'm Real" (Jennifer Lopez cover)	Punk Goes Pop
2003	"Playing Favorites"	Punk Goes Acoustic
2004	"Lasting Impressions" full band version	Unreleased
2005	"Nights and Weekends"	Based on a True Story Japanese Version
2005	"Classic Jazz"	Originally planned for Based on a True Story
2005	"The Rain Cloud and I"	Unreleased B-side; originally planned for Based on a True Story
2006	"Big Time Sensuality" (Björk cover)	Punk Goes '90s
2007	"Pictures"	Direction Japanese version
2007	"Time to Run"	Unreleased B-side
