= Vacationer (band) =

American electro-dream pop band

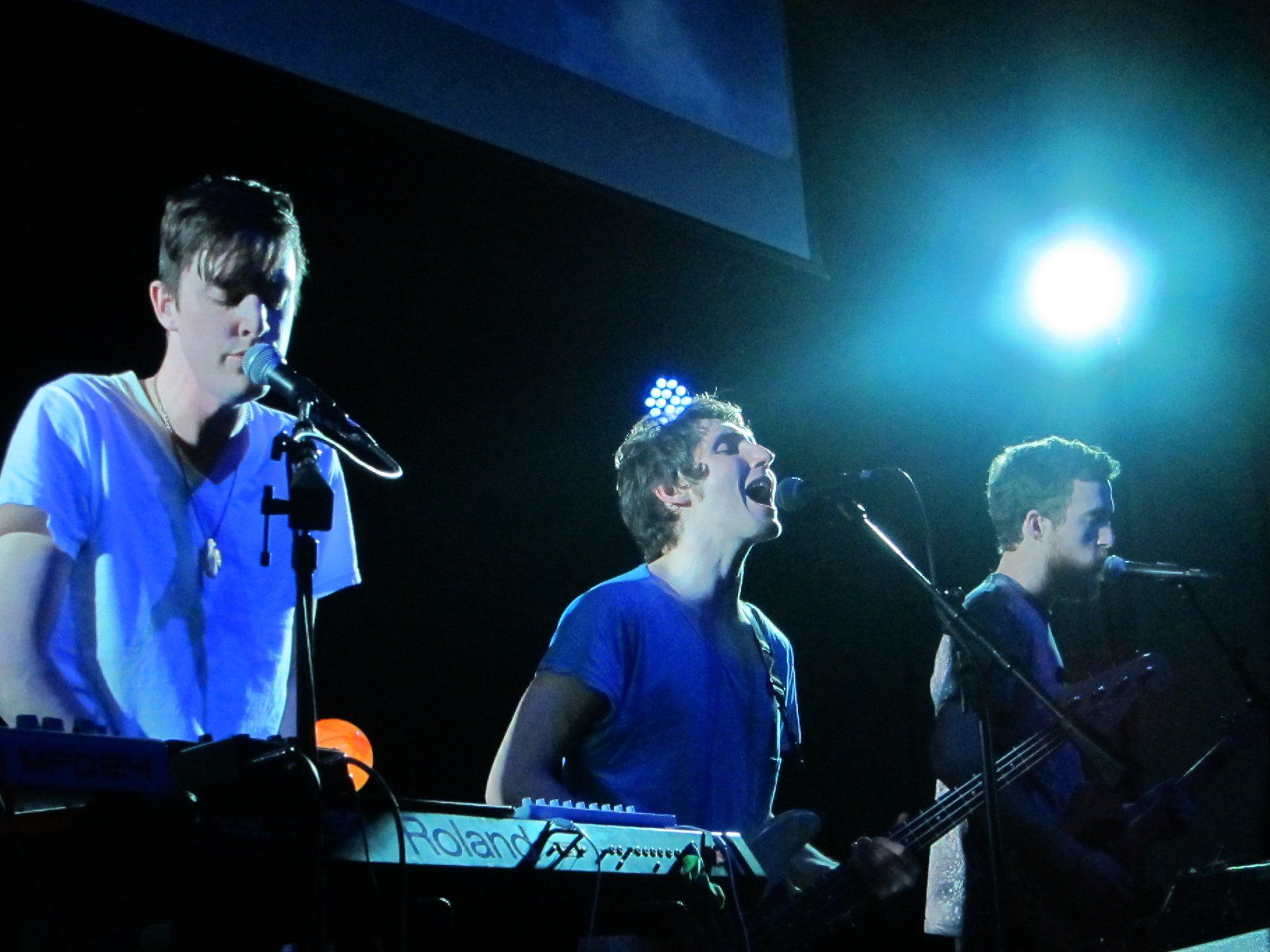
- Vacationer performing in 2012

Background information
- Origin: Philadelphia and Brooklyn, New York, United States
- Genres: Electropop; dream pop; psychedelic pop
- Years active: 2010–present
- Labels: Downtown; Paxico Records
- Spinoff of: Person L
- Members: Kenny Vasoli; Grant Wheeler; Matthew Young; Greg Altman; Ryan Zimmaro; Michael Mullin
- Website: vacationermusic.com

Vacationer is an American electropop and dream pop band based in Philadelphia, Pennsylvania, United States. It is composed of Kenny Vasoli (lead singer/bass), Ryan Zimmaro (drums), Michael Mullin (keyboards/backing vocals), Greg Altman (guitar/backing vocals). Song writing is done primarily by Kenny Vasoli.

== History ==
Vasoli expressed interest to Matt Watts, his manager and friend, about doing an electronic project after being inspired by LCD Soundsystem and other acts at the 2010 Bonnaroo Festival in Manchester, Tennessee. Watts connected Vasoli to the band Body Language which had a studio based in the neighborhood of Bedford Stuyvesant, Brooklyn called Landau Audio Design (LAD). After one session the song "Great Love" was started and the musical relationship was established. Subsequent instrumental recordings were started in Brooklyn and sent to Vasoli, who would add vocals and bass guitar. The songs started to take on tropical qualities due to Young's collection of Exotica, Polynesian, Hawaiian and Tropicalia Records. Most songs were sketched over email exchanges and then fleshed out at LAD.

Kenny has stated that he started Vacationer because he "wanted to make music that wasn't terribly loud, because the music at the time that I was making was terribly loud and I was constantly having my vocals compete with really loud music... and it just ended up being very taxing on myself physically. I just reached a point where I kept losing my voice and just felt really run down by the music I was playing, and not totally satisfied by the music I was creating. I wanted to make a conscious shift into music that wasn't as aggressive. So that was kind of the philosophy behind the approach to Vacationer music. I really wanted to learn more about how to make electronic music."

Of the first 5 songs recorded "Trip" was decided to be the lead song and was self released in April 2011. Due to its press and publicity, it earned the attention of several labels including Downtown Records, which signed the band.

The band released its first LP in 2012 on Downtown Records called Gone. It reached number 42 on the Top Heatseekers chart in the U.S. The band toured consistently throughout 2012 and early 2013 with Asteroids Galaxy Tour, Bombay Bicycle Club, Tennis, The Naked and Famous, Body Language and Niki and the Dove.

On June 24, 2014 the band released their second studio album, titled Relief. The album charted at number 10 on the Top Heatseekers chart.

On June 22, 2018, Vacationer released their third studio album Mindset on Downtown Records.

On September 27, 2019, Vacationer released instrumental album Wavelengths on Paxico Records.

On October 20, 2023, Vacationer released their fifth studio album Cherish on Paxico Records, with the single Dialogue.

== Discography ==
=== Studio albums ===
Year	Album
2012	Gone: Released: March 20, 2012; Label: Downtown Records
2014	Relief: Released: June 24, 2014; Label: Downtown Records
2018	Mindset: Released: June 22, 2018; Label: Downtown Records
2019	Wavelengths: Released: September 27, 2019; Label: Paxico Records
2023	Cherish: Released: October 5, 2023; Label: Paxico Records

=== Singles ===
- "Trip" (Downtown Records 2011)
- "Gone" (Downtown Records 2011)
- "The Wild Life" (Downtown Records 2014)
- "Magnetism" (Downtown Records 2018)
- "Being Here" (Downtown Records 2018)
- "Dialogue" (Plaxico Records 2023)
