= Say It Like You Mean It =

Studio album by The Starting Line
- Released: July 16, 2002
- Recorded: Early 2002
- Studio: Media Vortex
- Genre: Pop punk
- Length: 47:35
- Label: Drive-Thru
- Producer: Mark Trombino

The Starting Line chronology
With Hopes of Starting Over... (2001)	Say It Like You Mean It (2002)	The Make Yourself at Home EP (2003)

Singles from Say It Like You Mean It
- 1. "The Best of Me" Released: June 16, 2003

Say It Like You Mean It is the debut studio album by American rock band the Starting Line, following their debut EP With Hopes of Starting Over.... It was released on July 16, 2002.

== Background ==
Guitarist Matt Watts and drummer Mike Golla met while at a mutual friend's band practice. They formed their own band and started searching for a vocalist. The pair looked through AOL's member directory and emailed a number of people. They came across Kenny Vasoli, and subsequently met him while he was playing with his own band. He was drafted into Watts and Golla's band, which broke up after a week. The members remained in contact, and formed the Starting Line in mid-1999 under the name Sunday Drive. Drummer Tom Gryskiewitz was brought into the fold after him and Watts met at a restaurant. Golla subsequently moved to guitar. They wrote material in their practice space and tracked demos. They started gaining publicity with the aid of AOL and MP3.com. Independent label We the People Records became aware of the band's demos and signed them in mid-2000. Watts said they wanted to go with Drive-Thru Records, which was their dream label.

The band recorded an album's worth of material with producer Chris Badami, which was due for release in early 2001. However, it wasn't released due to the intervention of Drive-Thru Records, who saw the band's commercial potential. We the People Records, who had ties with Drive-Thru, had arranged a showcase for the label's founders Stefanie and Richard Reines. The pair were impressed with the band, but thought the songs lacked choruses. The band went away and reworked the material, before signing to Drive-Thru in April 2001. At the time, Vasoli was in high school and Watts was in college. With help from a guidance counsellor, Vasoli graduated early, finishing his last high school year and two semesters at community college. The band changed their name to the Starting Line following threats from a Missouri-based act also called Sunday Drive. The band released the With Hopes of Starting Over... EP in July. Following this, the band became a full-time touring act. As a proposed September 2001 tour with Finch and the Movielife was cancelled following the September 11 attacks, they took October 2001 off to write more songs for their forthcoming debut.

== Recording ==
The Starting Line cancelled their tour dates in January 2002 due to Vasoli contracting mono. Later that month, the band began recording Say It Like You Mean It at Media Vortex with producer Mark Trombino, who Golla said brought "an extra set of ears to the table". Vasoli said the band had wanted to work with Trombino for a while, intentionally waiting for him to be available so they could record with him. They went with him as all of the members' all-time favorite album was Clarity (1999) by Jimmy Eat World, which Trombino produced. Sessions were then delayed due to a family emergency, which resulted in a cancellation of tour dates. Vasoli remarked that he wished he was not sick during recording, "and I would have a voice to sing with. I didn't this time and it was the worst thing ever". "Leaving" and "Saddest Girl Story", two tracks that originally appeared on the With Hopes of Starting Over... EP, were re-recorded for Say It Like You Mean It. "Almost There, Going Nowhere", "Cheek to Cheek", "Left Coast Envy" and "The Drama Summer", which were originally recorded for the We the People album, were also re-recorded.

Nate Barcalow of Finch and Keith Goodwin of Days Away contributed additional vocals; the former on "Cheek to Cheek" and "This Ride", the latter on "Left Coast Envy". "Cheek to Cheek" was originally intended to feature a screaming part, but as Vasoli did not "have a very good scream at all", they enlisted Barcalow, who recorded his part while Finch were recording What It Is to Burn (2002). Vasoli said that since Barcalow was already recording screams for one of the songs, "I just thought it would be cool to have a scream [on "This Ride" ...] I figured why not two?" Goodwin was a friend of Vasoli, while Days Away lived around 10–20 minutes from the Starting Line. Trombino mixed the recordings at The Robot Factory in Los Angeles, California, before they were mastered by Steven Marcussen at Marcussen Mastering in Hollywood.

== Composition ==
Musically, the album drew comparisons to Blink-182, Jimmy Eat World and New Found Glory. The album's title is taken from a line in "Almost There, Going Nowhere". All of the songs were written by the band, except for "The Drama Summer" which was credited solely to Vasoli. The band usually worked on material together through jamming, where they would hear a part they enjoyed and expanded on it. On occasion, Golla or Vasoli arrived at practice with a complete song already written. Vasoli said the "meaner" tracks were about one of his ex-girlfriends. He initially promised not to write a song about her, but ended up writing six tracks. Similarly, "Hello Houston" and "A Goodnight's Sleep" were about a different ex-girlfriend. Vasoli said that despite him not being "that bitter about it anymore", he found it "funny to rehash".

The opening track "Up & Go" details a girl leaving despite having no reason to do so, and was compared to "Anthem Pt. 2" by Blink-182. "Given the Chance" is about the band's fans, specifically the ones in New Jersey. They found it hard to attract an audience in their home state of Pennsylvania, but found it easier in New Jersey. It was reminiscent of the tracks heard on Enema of the State (1999) by Blink-182. "Leaving" sees Vasoli yearning for unrequited love; it references the date February 12, 1999, which Vasoli said was a "really good night" that evolved into the "first really romantic experience I've ever had". "The Best of Me" has an acoustic intro, before shifting into punk rock track. "A Goodnight's Sleep" is a ballad, and was reminiscent of "Eyesore" by New Found Glory. Watts said "Saddest Girl Story" is about a girl he and Vasoli knew from their hometown. "The Drama Summer" is an acoustic emo song in the style of Dashboard Confessional and the Get Up Kids.

== Release ==
On February 6, 2002, Say It Like You Mean It was announced for release in July. In April 2002, the band toured Japan with The Planet Smashers and Nicotine. In April and May, the band went on tour with Brand New and Finch; the trek included an appearance at Skate and Surf Fest. Following this, the band went on a UK tour with New Found Glory and Finch. Between late June and mid-August, the band performed on the Warped Tour, appearing on the Drive-Thru stage. Say It Like You Mean It was made available for streaming on July 13, before being released on July 16 as a joint release by Drive-Thru and major label MCA Records. The band went on tour with Reel Big Fish in September and October. On October 27, a music video for "The Best of Me" was posted on Launch.com. The video starts with a guy attempting to impress a girl by playing music from a boombox outside of her residence. When the music stops, the band appear and start performing.

In early and mid-November, the band toured with Taking Back Sunday, the Early November and the Exit, before touring with Park, The Early November and Yellowcard for the remainder of the month. Further touring with Taking Back Sunday, alongside the Reunion Show and Northstar, followed in December. In January 2003, the band went on a tour of Japan with New Found Glory and Good Charlotte, before embarking on a European tour with Reel Big Fish and Sugarcult. To coincide with these shows, Say It Like You Mean It was released in those territories. Between mid-February and late April, they went on a US tour with Sum 41, No Use for a Name and Authority Zero.

A new music video was posted online for "The Best of Me" through MTV.com on June 13. The band went on a UK tour in June with support from From Autumn to Ashes and The Reunion Show. "The Best of Me" was released as a single on June 16. The band performed a few shows with Mae and River City High and Zolof the Rock & Roll Destroyer in early and mid-July. In mid-July and early August, the band appeared on the Warped Tour, playing on the main stage. "The Best of Me" was released to modern rock radio stations on July 22. Between late August and mid-October, the band performed on the Drive-Thru Records 2003 Invasion Tour. On September 8, the band performed on Jimmy Kimmel Live, which was followed by an appearance on IMX. In the same month, a music video was filmed for "Leaving"; it premiered during MTV2's Rock programme in November.

== Reception and legacy ==
Professional ratings
Review scores
Source	Rating
AllMusic	3/5 stars
The Mag	7/10 stars
Reading Eagle	D+
Rolling Stone	3/5 stars
Sorted	Favorable
Ultimate Guitar	10/10

AllMusic reviewer Kurt Morris said the record was "full of bubbly, positive lyrics", amidst "plenty of upbeats and catchy hooks." In a review for Rolling Stone, music critic J.D. Considine noted that the band had based their sound on the Green Day "blueprint, with plenty of bright, singalong choruses and hyperstrummed power chords." Despite the comparison to Green Day, he viewed the Starting Line as being more progressive musically and lyrically than them. Ultimate Guitar Archive noted that Vasoli's was deeper compared to the band's earlier works, and called his lyrics heartfelt.

As of July 2007, it has sold close to 300,000 copies. In October 2012, independent label SRC Vinyl released the We the People album under the name The Early Years. Following this, the band went on an anniversary tour for Say It Like You Mean It, during which they performed it in its entirety, in December. In May 2014, the album was re-pressed on vinyl through SRC Vinyl with the bonus tracks "Greg's Last Day" and an acoustic version of "The Best of Me". Later that year, Rock Sound included the album on their The 51 Most Essential Pop Punk Albums of All Time list at number 21. Kerrang! similarly included the album at number 27 on their 51 Greatest Pop-Punk Albums list. In a 2016 listicle, Rob Rousseau of A.Side TV viewed the album as a "masterwork" of the "era-defining Drive Thru Records ouvre." Cleveland.com ranked "The Best of Me" at number 33 on their list of the top 100 pop-punk songs. Alternative Press ranked "The Best of Me" at number 35 on their list of the best 100 singles from the 2000s. Writing in 2022, Andrew Sacher of BrooklynVegan said Vasoli's "yearning, yelpy delivery separated The Starting Line from their snot-nosed pop punk forebears, and when you listen the newer generation of pop punk and emo-pop bands, I'd say you hear even more echoes of Kenny's voice than of Tom DeLonge's or Jordan Pundik's".

== Track listing ==
All songs written by the Starting Line, except "The Drama Summer" by Kenny Vasoli.

No.	Title	Length
1.	"Up & Go"	3:36
2.	"Given the Chance"	2:57
3.	"Leaving"	3:33
4.	"The Best of Me"	4:18
5.	"A Goodnight's Sleep"	4:22
6.	"Almost There, Going Nowhere"	3:26
7.	"Cheek to Cheek"	4:38
8.	"Hello Houston"	2:23
9.	"Decisions, Decisions"	3:50
10.	"Saddest Girl Story"	3:28
11.	"Left Coast Envy"	4:25
12.	"The Drama Summer"	2:52
13.	"This Ride"	3:40
Total length:		47:28

Vinyl reissue bonus tracks
No.	Title	Length
14.	"The Best of Me" (acoustic)	4:18
15.	"Greg's Last Day"	2:37

== Personnel ==
Personnel per booklet.

The Starting Line

- Kenny Vasoli – vocals, bass guitar
- Matt Watts – rhythm guitar
- Tom Gryskiewicz – drums
- Mike Golla – lead guitar

Additional musicians

- Nate Barcalow – additional vocals (tracks 7 and 13)
- Keith Goodwin – additional vocals (track 11)

Production

- Mark Trombino – producer, engineer, mixing
- Steven Marcussen – mastering
- Tim Stedman – art direction, design
- Marco Orozco – design
- Micah Panzich – design
- Justin Stephens – photography

== Charts ==
Chart performance
Chart (2002–2003)	Peak position
UK Rock & Metal Albums (Official Charts)	31
US Billboard 200	109
US Heatseekers Albums (Billboard)	1
