= Nintendo Fusion Tour =

Music and video game festival by Nintendo

- Genre: Music and video game festival
- Years active: 4
- Inaugurated: 2003
- Most recent: 2006
- Attendance: 160,000
- Sponsor: Nintendo

Nintendo Fusion Tour was a touring rock music and video game festival sponsored by Nintendo, which began in 2003.

Nintendo's Fusion Tour provided early exposure for then-developing bands such as Evanescence, Story of the Year, My Chemical Romance, Lostprophets, Fall Out Boy, Anberlin and Panic! at the Disco. The outing expanded from 25 dates in 2003 with 90,000 in attendance to 45 in 2006 with more than 160,000, according to Nintendo.

The event has not been held since 2006, and Nintendo has not explained its plans for the tour.

== 2003 tour ==
A + denotes an unofficial tour title.

=== 2003 bands ===
- Evanescence
- Cold
- Revis
- Finger Eleven
- Cauterize

=== 2003 games ===
GameCube games

- 1080° Avalanche
- Billy Hatcher and the Giant Egg (Demo)
- F-Zero GX (Demo)
- Madden NFL 2004
- Soulcalibur II (Demo)
- Star Wars Rogue Squadron III: Rebel Strike
- Viewtiful Joe
- P.N.03
- Wallace & Gromit: Project Zoo

Game Boy Advance games

- Advance Wars 2: Black Hole Rising
- 007: Nightfire
- Donkey Kong Country
- Mario Kart: Super Circuit
- Sonic Advance 2
- Street Fighter Alpha 3
- Tony Hawk's Pro Skater 4
- WarioWare, Inc.: Mega Microgame$!
- A Link To The Past / Four Swords

== 2004 tour ==
=== 2004 bands ===
- Story of The Year
- My Chemical Romance
- Lostprophets
- Letter Kills

Select shows

- Anberlin - October 13 - November 1
- Autopilot Off - November 3 - November 13

=== 2004 games ===
GameCube games

- F-Zero GX
- Mario Kart: Double Dash
- Metroid Prime 2: Echoes (Demo)
- Spider-Man 2
- Super Smash Bros. Melee
- Terminator 3: Redemption
- WWE Day of Reckoning

== 2005 tour ==
=== 2005 bands ===
- Fall Out Boy
- The Starting Line
- Motion City Soundtrack
- Boys Night Out
- Panic! at the Disco

=== 2005 games ===
GameCube games

- Battalion Wars
- Geist
- The Legend of Zelda: Twilight Princess (Demo)
- Madden: 2006
- Mario Baseball
- Metroid Prime 2: Echoes
- NHL 2006
- Resident Evil 4
- Super Mario Strikers (Demo)
- Super Smash Bros. Melee (Note: Unofficial tour title.)
- Tiger Woods PGA Tour 2006
- Tony Hawk's American Wasteland
- Ultimate Spider-Man
- WWE Day of Reckoning 2

Nintendo DS games

- Lost in Blue
- Mario Kart DS
- Meteos
- Metroid Prime Hunters
- Metroid Prime Pinball
- Nintendogs
- Tom Clancy's Splinter Cell: Chaos Theory

== 2006 tour ==
=== 2006 bands ===
- Hawthorne Heights
- Relient K
- Emery
- Plain White T's
- The Sleeping

=== 2006 games ===
Wii games

- Wii Sports: Baseball
- Wii Sports: Bowling
- Wii Sports: Boxing
- Wii Sports: Tennis
- Wii Play: Shooting
- Excite Truck (Demo)
- Metroid Prime 3: Corruption (Demo) (Note: The game was removed or added during the course of the tour.)
- The Legend of Zelda: Twilight Princess (Demo)
- Tony Hawk's Downhill Jam (Demo)
- WarioWare: Smooth Moves (Demo)

Nintendo DS games

- Mario vs. Donkey Kong 2: March of the Minis
- Star Fox Command
- Elite Beat Agents
- New Super Mario Bros.
- Final Fantasy III DS
- Clubhouse Games
- Mega Man ZX
- Lego Star Wars II: The Original Trilogy

== See also ==
- Warped Tour
- Ozzfest
