= Kenny Vasoli =

American singer, songwriter, and record producer (born 1984)

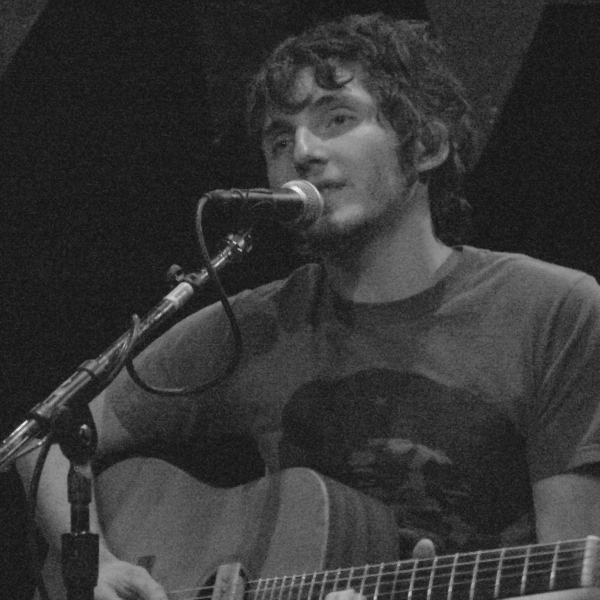
- Vasoli playing at the Bowery Ballroom in New York City in 2009

Background information
- Born: Kenneth Robert Vasoli; May 20, 1984 (age 42); Abington Township, Pennsylvania, U.S.
- Genres: Pop punk, emo, post-hardcore, indie rock, psychedelic pop
- Occupations: Singer, songwriter, producer, musician
- Instruments: Vocals, bass, guitar, piano, keyboards
- Years active: 1999–present
- Member of: The Starting Line, Vacationer
- Formerly of: Person L

Kenneth Robert Vasoli (born May 20, 1984) is an American singer, songwriter, and record producer from Philadelphia, Pennsylvania. Vasoli is currently the lead singer and songwriter of pop-punk band the Starting Line and psychedelic pop band Vacationer. From 2006 to 2010, Vasoli was also the lead vocalist and chief songwriter of alternative rock band Person L.

== Biography ==
Kenneth Robert Vasoli was born May 20, 1984, in Abington, Pennsylvania, and attended Hatboro-Horsham High School. At the age of 14, Vasoli was invited to join the pop punk band The Starting Line after Matt Watts read his AOL Messenger profile. Vasoli finished high school early at the age of 17 to concentrate on music, and was 18 years old upon release of The Starting Line's debut album Say It Like You Mean It in 2002. Vasoli was a member of the bands The Prize Fight and Smash Adams, and in early 2004 also had a short-lived side-project called Statue with members of The Prize Fight and Inkling.

In 2006, Vasoli formed the band Person L as an outlet to explore other musical styles different from The Starting Line. Person L was just a side project when The Starting Line’s third album "Direction" (2007) was being recorded. As Vasoli puts it, his new band was a way to get his “weird-ies” out. But after "Direction” it became his full-time creative focus, as he felt in some ways spent with his original band. "I probably was the leader in us cooling down. I think I had probably reached a point where I felt a little bit tapped creatively to write for that band," Vasoli said.

"Life is short dude," Vasoli said, speaking about his ever-changing creative outlets. "If I'm given the opportunity to be in the driver's seat, I don't want to paint myself into a corner of being trapped in these same 20 songs for my whole life."

In 2010, Vasoli formed psychedelic pop band Vacationer. The project has released five records to date: Gone (2012), Relief (2014), Mindset (2018), Wavelengths (2019) and Cherish (2023) .

Collaborating with Joe Reinhart and TJ DeBlois during the pandemic led to the formation of FILM, which released Permanence (2026). The record was originally intended as a demo though released on vinyl after DeBlois's death.

== Discography ==
With The Starting Line

- Say It Like You Mean It (2002)
- Based on a True Story (2005)
- Direction (2007)
- Eternal Youth (2025)

With Person L

- Initial (2008)
- The Positives (2009)

With Vacationer

- Gone (2012)
- Relief (2014)
- Mindset (2018)
- Wavelengths (2019)
- Cherish (2023)

With FILM

- Permanence (2026)
